= List of HC Slovan Bratislava players =

The following is a list of players, both past and current, who appeared at least in one game for the HC Slovan Bratislava. Three players have made more than 500 regular-season appearances for the club.

== A ==
- Jindřich Abdul, (2019–20)
- Carl Ackered, (2022–23)
- Sena Acolatse, (2024–)
- Denis Afinogenov, (2005–06), Ufa, Russia
- Jonas Ahnelöv, (2023–25)
- Nerijus Ališauskas, (2020–21)
- Patrik Andrisík, (2024–)
- David Arvay (2010–11)
- Kaspars Astašenko, (2006–07), Riga, Latvia

== B ==
- Pavol Babic, (1982–83)
- Daniel Babka, (1999–2002)
- Peter Babkovič, (2004–05)
- Igor Baček, (2004–09), Bratislava, Slovakia
- Pavol Baciak, (1969–72)
- Patrik Bačík, (2015–)
- Johan Backlund, (2014–15)
- Casey Bailey (2018–19)
- Martin Bakoš, (2007–08)
- Jozef Balej, (2011–12)
- Milan Bališ, (2005–09)
- Ivan Baranka, (2014–15)
- Egor Baranov, (2018–19)
- Cam Barker (2014–18)
- Jaroslav Barochovsky (1984–85)
- Samuel Baroš, (2014–24)
- Josef Barta, (1959–63)
- Libor Barta, (2004–06)
- Marek Bartánus, (2011–12)
- Martin Bartek, (2004–05), Zvolen, Slovakia
- Milan Bartovič, (2012–16)
- Joe Basaraba, (2019–20)
- Marian Bazany, (1994–2000)
- Martin Belluš, (2021–22)
- Adam Beke, (2020–21)
- Ivan Beňo, (1981–89)
- Michal Beňo, (2020–24)
- Miroslav Berek, (1957–67)
- Vladimir Beres, (1982–88)
- Julius Bergman, (2023–24)
- Adam Bezák, (2008–23)
- Marián Bezák, (1975–87)
- Juraj Bezúch, (2017–18)
- Radovan Biegl, (1999–2000)
- Karol Biermann, (2002–04)
- Peter Bjalončík, (2024–25)
- Miroslav Bláha, (1986–87)
- Zdeněk Bláha, (1945–53)
- Andrej Blasko, (1995–97)
- Jan Blasko, (1983–91)
- Mário Bližňák, (2012–15)
- Miroslav Bobocký, (2010–11)
- Bogdan, (1962–68)
- Lukáš Bohunický, (2007–12), Bratislava, Slovakia
- Dávid Boldižár, (2017–19)
- Alfréd Bollardt, (1948–55)
- Igors Bondarevs, (2001–02), Riga, Latvia
- Radovan Bondra, (2019-)
- Dalibor Bortňák, (2020–21)
- Josef Boumedienne, (2012–13)
- Zach Boychuk, (2017–18)
- Vladimir Brada, (1964–65)
- Ján Brejčák, (2013–15)
- Alex Breton, (2021–22)
- Jakub Brezak, (2022–23)
- Peter Brieda, (1986–91)
- Boris Brincko, (2024–2025)
- Michael Brodzinski, (2020–21)
- Chris Brown, (2023–24)
- Barry Brust, (2015–20)
- Augustin Bubník, (1958–62)
- Dávid Buc, (2010–19)
- Samuel Buček, (2020–21)
- Jan Buchtele, (2017–18)
- Emil Bučič, (2001–02)
- Igor Budovsky, (1990–91)
- Matej Bukna, (1988–98)
- Jozef Bukovinský, (1969–84)
- Tomáš Bulík, (2010–12)
- Vladimír Búřil, (1987–2001)
- Alexander Buzasi, (1987–88)
- Petr Buzek, (2005–06), Jihlava, Czech Rep

== C ==
- Michal Čajkovský, (2009–10)
- Ivo Čapek, (1997–99)
- Jozef Čapla, (1955–69)
- Brett Carson, (2019–20)
- Mario Cartelli, (2010–11)
- Brian Casey, (2000–02), St. Johns, NF
- Július Černický, (1956–69)
- Ivan Černý, (1977–89)
- Tomáš Černý, (2017–18)
- Rudolf Červený, 2018–19)
- Matěj Češík, (2006–07)
- Samuel Chalupa, (2021–22)
- Jonathan Cheechoo, (2016–17)
- Kyle Chipchura, (2016–19)
- Tomas Chlubna, (2005–06)
- Ján Chovan, (2005–08)
- Miroslav Chudý, (1987–88)
- Ladislav Čierny, (1994–96)
- Jakub Cíger, (2009–12)
- Zdeno Cíger, (1996–06), Martin, Slovakia
- Marek Čiliak, (2018–19)
- Martin Cinibulk, (1996–97)
- Marián Cisár, (1995–96)
- Roman Cisar, (1977–78)
- Jared Coreau, (2022–24)

== D ==
- Marek Ďaloga, (2016–17)
- Adrian Daniel, (1997–98)
- Patrik Danišovský, (2021–22)
- Jozef Danko, (1979–82)
- Marko Daňo, (2012–14)
- Ivan Ďatelinka, (2011–13)
- Frantisek Dej, (2022–23)
- Tomáš Demel, (2009–11)
- Daniel Demo, (2019–24)
- Simon Després, (2017–18)
- Dušan Devečka, (2005–09)
- Ryan Dmowski, (2025–)
- Michal Dobroň, (2011–12)
- Róbert Döme, (2007–09), Skalica, Slovakia
- Ivan Dornic, (1980–92)
- Ivan Dornič, (2002–06), Bratislava, Slovakia
- Jaromír Dragan, (1983–84)
- Vladimír Dravecký, (2012–13)
- Adam Drgoň, (2003–05), Trnava, Slovakia
- Martin Dubina, (2007–08)
- Vladimír Dučaj, (1963–72)
- Tomas Dudáš, (2023–25)
- Reid Duke, (2022–23)
- Martin Dulák, (2008–09)
- Miroslav Durak, (2005–06), Topoľčany, Slovakia
- Peter Ďuriš, (2001–02)
- Roman Durný, (2020–21)
- Vladimír Dzurilla, (1960–73)

== E ==
- Haralds Egle, (2024–25)
- Turner Elson, (2025–)
- Boris Ertel, (2004–05)

== F ==
- Branislav Fábry, (2002–05)
- Emo Fabry, (1950–51)
- Andrej Fabuš, (2024–)
- Karol Fako, (1948–64)
- Andrej Farkašovský, (1994–95)
- Branislav Fatul, (1994–95)
- Oliver Fatul, (2021–)
- Ivan Feneš, (1995–96)
- Samuel Fereta, (2022–23)
- Ľubomír Fetkovič, (2023–24)
- Ján Filc, (1971–73)
- Brett Findlay, (2023–24)
- Daniil Fominykh, (2021–24)
- Kurtis Foster, (2014–15)
- Peter Franta, (1983–92)
- Peter Frühauf, (2010–12)
- Martin Funta, (1994–97)
- Richard Führich, (1960–62)

== G ==
- Eduard Gábriš, (1955–64)
- Daniel Gachulinec, (2021–24)
- Jozef Gajdoš, (1986–88)
- Patrick Galbraith, (2011–12)
- Martin Gálik, (1996–2003), Bratislava, Slovakia
- Marek Galiovský, (1982–86)
- Ryan Garbutt, (2017–18)
- Michael Garnett, (2015–16)
- Rastislav Gašpar, (2020–22)
- Éric Gélinas, (2018–19)
- Matteo Gennaro, (2022–23)
- Colby Genoway, (2017–18)
- Denis Godla, (2013–25)
- Andrej Golian, (2021–25)
- Jozef Golonka, (1955–69)
- Viktor Goncharenko, (1991–92)
- Juraj Gráčik, (2006–09), Topoľčany, Slovakia
- Ivan Grandtner, (1961–73)
- František Gregor, (1955–70)
- Martin Gregor, (1992–94)
- Milan Gregor, (1961–64)
- Evgeny Gribko, (1998–2000)
- Mário Grman, (2018–19)
- Stanislav Gron, (1995–97)
- Kristers Gudļevskis, (2020–22)
- Vladimír Gýna, (2005–06)

== H ==
- Július Haas, (1967–77)
- Vladislav Habal, (2019–20)
- David Hájek, (2010–11)
- David Hajnik, (2023–24)
- Dušan Halahija, (1986–91)
- Juraj Halaj, (2001–04)
- Jaroslav Halák, (2003–04), Bratislava, Slovakia
- Marco Halama, (2016–17)
- Daniel Hančák, (2001–09)
- Martin Haronik, (2025–)
- Brant Harris, (2020–23)
- Kevin Harvey, (2011–12)
- Marcel Haščák, (2021–23)
- Wiliam Hauser, (2022–23)
- Marek Hecl, (2017–18)
- Radoslav Hecl, (1996–06), Partizánske, Slovakia
- Tomáš Hedera, (2017–19)
- Peter Hegyi, (1986–87)
- František Hejčík, (1977–79)
- Martin Hlavačka, (2008–09)
- Samuel Hlavaj, (2021–23)
- Hlinčík, (1962–63)
- Michal Hlinka, (2016–18)
- Miroslav Hlinka, (1999–2000)
- Mitchell Hoelscher, (2024–25)
- Miloš Hollý, (1982–83)
- Patrick Holway, (2023–24)
- Jan Horáček, (2004–05), Benešov, Czech Rep.
- Stanislav Horanský, (1983–89)
- Ernest Hornák, (1981–92)
- Ladislav Horský, (1948–58)
- Rudolf Horský, (1950–51)
- Marián Horváth, (1983–98)
- Milan Horváth, (1982–86)
- Ville Hostikka, (2012–13)
- Roman Hosťovecký, (1980–86)
- Houška, (1963–68)
- Sasu Hovi, (2006–09)
- Jan Hrabák, (1983–85)
- Michal Hreus, (1999–2009)
- Pavol Hronský, (1988–89)
- Tomáš Hrnka, (2017–19)
- Milan Hruška, (2006–10), Topoľčany, Slovakia
- Roman Hrušovský, (2000–01)
- Peter Huba, (2006–10)
- Marko Hučko, (2007–08)
- Libor Hudáček, (2009–15)
- Marek Hudec, (2019–20)
- Michal Hudec, (1997–2012)
- Stanislav Hudec, (2009–10)
- Martin Hujsa, (2003–11)
- Richard Huna, (2009–11)
- Robert Huna, (2009–11)
- Ľubomír Hurtaj, (2000–07)
- Thomas Pavel Hurtaj, (2024–25)
- Marian Hurtík, (1970–74)

== I ==
- Daniel Iffka, (1990–94)
- Roman Ilyin, (1997–2000)
- Jozef Izso, (1980–81)

== J ==
- Joona Jääskeläinen, (2021–22)
- Ric Jackman, (2010–11)
- Rastislav Jančuška, (1947–61)
- Tomas Janek, (2003–04)
- Ondrej Janík, (2008–12)
- Boris Jankovský, (2009–11)
- Branislav Jánoš, (2003–06)
- Adam Jánošík, (2018–19)
- Jaroslav Janus, (2012–)
- René Jarolín, (2006–07)
- Michal Jasenec, (2020–24)
- Ján Jaško, (1977–89)
- Tomáš Jasko, (2000–02), Bratislava, Slovakia
- Māris Jass, (2011–12)
- Miroslav Javín, (2002–03)
- Peter Javorček, (1992–93)
- Žiga Jeglič, (2014–19)
- Dominik Jendek, (2019–)
- Ján Jendek, (1950–66)
- Lucas Jendek, (2023–24)
- Rudolf Jendek, (1995–2011)
- Aleksandrs Jerofejevs, (2011–12)
- Peter Junas, (2002–06)
- Robin Just, (2005–07), Bratislava, Slovakia

== K ==
- Roman Kadera, (2005–06), Přerov, Czech Rep.
- Martin Kalináč, (1987–89)
- Martin Kalináč, (2010–12)
- Nate Kallen, (2022–23)
- Robert Kántor, (2010–11)
- Richard Kapuš, (1990–2011)
- Ladislav Karabin, (1988–98)
- Martin Karafiat, (2004–05)
- Tomi Karhunen, (2011–12)
- Lukáš Kašpar, (2015–18)
- Marian Kecka, (1971–72)
- Milan Kečkeš, (1984–88)
- Miloš Kelemen, (2018–19)
- Nikolas Ketner, (2010–11)
- Vladimir Kiripolsky, (1980–81)
- Henri Kiviaho, (2024–)
- Tommy Kiviaho, (2000–01), Helsinki, Finland
- Jozef Klejna, (1978–79)
- Milan Klement, (1983–86)
- Lukáš Klok, (2018–19)
- Peter Klouda, (2005–06)
- Dušan Klučiar, (2021–22)
- Andrej Kmec, (2007–08)
- Ján Kobezda, (2002–03), Liava, Slovakia
- Juraj Kočan, (1950–51)
- Jiří Kodet, (1979–84)
- Miroslav Kohout, (1987–88)
- Michal Kokavec, (2002–08), Žilina, Slovakia
- Marek Kolba, (2000–07)
- Milan Kolena, (2013–14)
- Andrej Kollár, (2000–03), Winnipeg, Canada
- Ľubomír Kolník, (1996–2001)
- Branislav Konrád, (2008–13)
- Marius Konstantinidis, (1988–89)
- Tomáš Kopecký, (2016–17)
- Miroslav Kopřiva, (2013–14)
- Zdeněk Kopsa, (1954–55)
- Štefan Kordiak, (1958–77)
- Marek Korenčík, (2023–24)
- Adam Kormúth, (2019–20)
- Ivo Kotaška, (2008–09)
- Gennadi Kotenok, (1990–91)
- Kristian Kovac, (2005–06)
- Ladislav Kovačič, (1960–62)
- Jozef Kováčik, (2007–11)
- Lukáš Kozák, (2011–18)
- Ján Kožiak, (2017–18)
- Eugen Krajčovič, (1977–80)
- Luca Krakovský, (2021–22)
- Dušan Králik, (1983–89)
- Tomáš Královič, (2021–)
- Miroslav Krba, (1982–83)
- Patrik Krišák, (1995–96)
- Radoslav Kropáč, (1993–2009)
- Martin Krumpál, (1997–2000)
- Tomáš Kubalík, (2016–17)
- Branislav Kubka, (2023–25)
- Martin Kučera, (1999–2000)
- Radim Kucharczyk, (2005–06)
- Jiří Kučný, (2019–20)
- David Kudělka, (2005–06), Přerov, Czech Republic
- Peter Kudelka, (2007–08)
- Andrej Kudrna, (2011–15)
- Michal Kudzia, (1994–95)
- Roman Kukumberg, (2006–20), Bratislava, Slovakia
- Roman Kukumberg, (2022–)
- Martin Kulha, (2001–11)
- Tomáš Kundrátek, (2015–17)
- Peter Kundrik, (2020–22)
- Dalibor Kusovsky, (2001–07)
- Zdeněk Kutlák, (2013–14)
- Viktor Kutsenko, (1991–92)
- Milan Kužela, (1967–80)
- Kvasnica, (1961–62)
- Milan Kvasnica, (1964–66)
- Milan Kytnár, (2012–13)

== L ==
- Lukáš Lačný, (2020–21)
- Shawn Lalonde, (2023–24)
- Patrik Lamper, (2017–19)
- Lukáš Lauko, (2006–07)
- Miroslav Lažo, (1996–2010)
- Louis Leblanc, (2015–16)
- Cameron Lee, (2020–21)
- David LeNeveu, (2014–15)
- Roman Lepes, (1983–86)
- Mikhail Lepskii, (2020–21)
- Peter Lichanec, (2011–12)
- Fabian Ličko, (2025–)
- Ján Lipiansky, (1992–2013)
- Lukáš Lipiansky, (2022–23)
- Róbert Liščák, (2008–09), Skalica, Slovakia
- Adam Liška, (2018–19)
- Marek Lisoň, (2007–10)
- Viktor Lonsmín, (1943–44)
- Adam Lukošik, (2020–25)
- Vladimir Lukscheider, (1983–84)
- Vladimir Lukscheider, (1958–69)
- Mário Lunter, (2014–19)
- Matej Lupták, (2024–)
- Patrik Lušňák, (2015–17)
- Patrik Luža, (1990–97)
- Patrik Luža, (2011–17)

== M ==
- Michal Macho, (2002–12), Martin, Slovakia
- Matt MacKenzie, (2021–23)
- Martin Madový, (1999-2000)
- Samson Mahbod, (2023–24)
- Patrik Maier, (2020-)
- Andrey Makarov, (2020–21)
- Josef Maleček, (1945-48)
- Ján Marcinko, (2023–24)
- Tomáš Marcinko, 2025–)
- Richard Marko, (1997–98)
- Vladimír Markup, (1956–58)
- Oliver Maron, (2000–01), Bratislava, Slovakia
- Antonín Máša, (1921–22)
- Patrik Masnica, (2023–25)
- Marek Mastič, (1994–2000)
- Michal Matoušek, (2022–23)
- Tomáš Matoušek, (2013–23)
- Ivan Matulík, (1986–91)
- Marek Mazanec, (2017–18)
- Milan Mažgút, (1984–85)
- Roman Mega, (1989–97)
- Tibor Melichárek, (2000–01)
- Tomáš Méry, (2008–09)
- Andrej Meszároš, (2016–21)
- Pavel Michalec, (1957–66)
- Miroslav Michalek, (1989–94)
- Jaroslav Michel, (1956–62)
- Pavol Mihalik, (2000–03), Slovakia
- Vladimír Mihálik, (2012–16)
- Petr Mika, (2005–06), Prague, Czech Rep.
- Michel Miklík, (2012–20)
- Miroslav Miklošovič, (1971–80)
- Juraj Mikus, (2012–18)
- Tomáš Mikúš, (2012–14)
- Craig Millar, (2001–02), Winnipeg, MAN
- Jakub Minárik, (2022–25)
- Dean Mirt, (2025–)
- Peter Misovic, (1971–78)
- Tomáš Mojžíš, (2012–14)
- Karol Morávek, (1979–83)
- Miroslav Mosnár, (1989–2000)
- Daniel Mracka, (2002–03)
- Bruno Mráz, (2013-21)
- Richard Mráz, (2013–14)
- Jozef Mrena, (2000–04), Bratislava, Slovakia
- Milan Mrukvia, (1967–79)
- Lukáš Mucha, (2006–07)
- Oleg Mudrov, (1990–91)
- Matt Murley, (2014–15)
- Matt Murphy, (2023–24)
- Wade Murphy, (2024–25)
- Igor Musatov, (2016–17)

== N ==
- Ladislav Nagy, (2014–16)
- Václav Nedomanský, (1962–74)
- Andrej Nedorost, (2009–11)
- Václav Nedorost, (2014–17)
- Jaroslav Nedvěd, (2003–04)
- Tomáš Němčický, (2004–06)
- Oldřich Němec, (1947–48)
- Vladimír Nemec, (2009–10)
- Tomáš Netík, (2013–15)
- Daniel Neumann, (2007–09)
- Miroslav Nitka, (1984–85)
- Pavol Norovský, (1977–84)
- Warren Norris, (2001–02), St. John's, NF
- Richard Noskovič, (2020–21)
- Peter Novajovský, (2007–09)
- Filip Novák, (2015–17)
- Pavel Novotný, (1983–84)

== O ==
- Zach O'Brien, (2023–24)
- Ryan O'Connor, (2025–)
- Brendan O'Donnell, (2020–21)
- Jozef Ölvecký, (1965–66)
- Peter Ölvecký, (2012–15)
- Karol Ondreička, (1982–92)
- Jozef Ondrejka, (2002–2004)
- Adam Ondriš, (2020–21)
- Filip Orčík, (2011–12)
- Austin Ortega, (2024–25)
- Antonio Ožvald, (2022–22)

== P ==
- Jozef Panák, (1970–71)
- Žiga Pance, (2019–20)
- Richard Pánik, (2024–25)
- Vasili Pankov, (1997–2000)
- Francis Paré, (2015–16)
- Tyler Parks, (2020–21)
- Matúš Miroslav Parobek, (2019–20)
- Dušan Pašek, (1977–91)
- Dušan Pašek, (2003–07)
- Denis Pätoprstý, (2016–17)
- Miloš Paulovič, (1986–92)
- Stanislav Pavelec, (1983–92)
- Christián Pavlas, (2015–17)
- Petr Pavlas, (2002–09), Olomouc, Czech Rep.
- Slavomír Pavličko, (2001–04)
- Milan Pažítka, (1990-91)
- Irenej Pažitný, (1963–64)
- Liam Pecararo, (2022–26)
- Lukáš Pék, (2005–06)
- Tomáš Pék, (2010–12)
- Anthony Peluso, (2020–21)
- Vadim Pereskokov, (2024–25)
- František Pergl, (1945–46)
- Jonáš Peterek, (2024–)
- Anthony Peters, (2021–22)
- Jozef Pethö, (1982–94)
- Maxim Petras, (2025–)
- Richard Petráš, (2019–22)
- Samuel Petráš, (2015–24)
- Šimon Petráš, (2019–20)
- Henrik Petré, (2008–09)
- Stanislav Petrík, (2001–02)
- Ján Petriska, (2022–)
- Branko Petrovic, (1988–89)
- Róbert Pientka, (1986–87)
- Ľubomír Pištek, (2000–09), Bratislava, Slovakia
- Nick Plastino, (2016–17)
- Ján Plch, (2003–04)
- Peter Podhradský, (1998–2000)
- Andrej Podkonický, (2001–02), Zvolen, Czech Rep.
- Matic Podlipnik, (2019–20)
- Justin Pogge, (2016–17)
- Dušan Pohorelec, (1993–96)
- Émile Poirier, (2023–24)
- Matej Pokorný, (2016–17)
- Ľubomír Pokovič, (1979–87)
- Miroslav Preisinger, (2010–)
- Marek Priechodský, (1999–2001), Bratislava, Slovakia
- David Printz, (2012–13)
- Juraj Prokop, (2004–07), Bratislava, Slovakia
- Ondrej Prokop, (1999–2001)
- Bohumil Prošek, (1952–53)
- Anatoly Protasenya, (2015–16)
- Róbert Pukalovič, (1979–99)
- Róbert Pukalovič, (2003–04)
- Radovan Puliš, (2015–)

== R ==
- Tomáš Rachůnek, (2014–15)
- Branko Radivojevič, (2013–14)
- Teemu Ramstedt, (2017–18)
- Brendan Ranford, (2020–24)
- Branislav Rapáč, (2020–21)
- William Rapuzzi, (2021–23)
- Igor Rataj, (1998–2003)
- Chad Rau, (2018–19)
- Dominik Rehák, (2014–15)
- Juraj Rehák, (1987–92)
- Miloš Rehák, (1993–95)
- Theodor Reimann, (1950–51)
- Jindřich Reitmayer, (1945–51)
- Michal Řepík, (2017–19)
- Pavol Rešetka, (1999–2000)
- Martin Réway, (2017–18)
- František Ridzoň, (2025–)
- Nick Ritchie, (2024–25)
- Dmitri Rodin, (2000–01)
- Ľubomír Roháčik, (1977–85)
- Ladislav Romančík, (2023–25)
- Mislav Rosandić, (2015–17)
- Rastislav Rovnianek, (1998–99)
- Joe Rullier, (2010–11)
- Dárius Rusnák, (1977–89)
- Dárius Rusnák, (2005–06)
- Ondrej Rusnák, (2007–10)
- Karol Rusznyák, (1986–99)
- Patrik Rusznyák, (2024–25)
- Štefan Ružička, (2014–15)
- Patrik Rybár, (2010–11)
- Pavol Rybár, (2000–11)

== S ==
- Roman Sabo, (2019–20)
- Boris Sádecký, (2016-18)
- Michal Šafařík, (2002–03)
- Marcel Sakáč, (1966–81)
- Marcel Sakáč, (1994–2002), Bratislava, Slovakia
- Miroslav Šatan, (2003–14), Topoľčany, Slovakia
- Bystrik Ščepko, (1987–92)
- Nick Schaus, (2018–19)
- Ian Scheid, (2023–24)
- Nikita Scherbak (2022–23)
- Robert Schnabel, (2010–11)
- Martin Šechný, (1982–83)
- Eduard Šedivý, (2019–20)
- Jakub Sedláček, (2017–18)
- Jiří Šejba, (1995–97)
- Normunds Sējējs, (2003–04)
- Andrej Sekera, (2012–13)
- Daniel Seman, (2002–03)
- Michal Sersen, (2002–25), Gelnica, Slovakia
- Daniel Ševčík, (1998–99)
- Petr Ševela, (1982–83)
- Eliezer Sherbatov, (2017–18)
- Brendan Shinnimin, (2025–26)
- Andrei Shutov, (2024–25)
- Tomáš Šiffalovič, (2007–09)
- Jonathan Sigalet, (2012–15)
- Tomáš Šille, (1987–93)
- Timotej Šille, (2023–25)
- Eduard Šimun, (2018–)
- Roman Šimunek, (2000–02)
- Peter Siroťák, (1999–2000)
- Juraj Šiška, (2015–17)
- Peter Šišovský, (2020–21)
- Pavol Skalický, (2015–18)
- Vlastimil Škandera, (1989–90)
- Dávid Skokan, (2009–16)
- René Školiak, (2002–06)
- Stanislav Škorvánek, (2006–07)
- Martin Škoula, (2013–14)
- Andrej Škultéty, (2020–21)
- Karol Sloboda, (2004–06), Bratislava, Slovakia
- Martin Sloboda, (2007–12)
- Radovan Sloboda, (2000–06), Bratislava, Slovakia
- Marek Sloboda, (2017–20)
- Marek Slovák, (2024–25)
- Marián Smerčiak, (2002–03)
- Radek Smoleňák, (2016–18)
- Patrik Sokoli, (2024–25)
- Samuel Solenský, (2025–)
- Oļegs Sorokins, (2000–01), Riga, Latvia
- Alex Šotek, (2021–23)
- Rastislav Šottník, (1990–92)
- Tomáš Špila, (2003–06)
- Gabriel Spilar, (2004–05)
- Samuel Šramatý, (2025–)
- Jan Srdínko, (2006–09)
- Marek Srnec, (2007–08)
- Martin St. Pierre, (2019–20)
- Martin Štajnoch, (2008–22)
- Miroslav Staněk, (1977–78)
- Roman Stantien, (2004–05)
- Peter Staroň, (1993–2007)
- Tomáš Starosta, (2014–17)
- Ján Starší, (1957–66)
- Andrej Šťastný, (2012–18)
- Anton Šťastný, (1977–94)
- Marián Šťastný, (1970–80)
- Michal Šťastný, (1992–95)
- Peter Šťastný, (1973–94)
- Juraj Štefanka, (1999–2001)
- Miroslav Štefanka, (1999–2003)
- Jakub Štěpánek, (2017–19)
- Pavol Štetka, (2024–)
- Charles Stopka, (1946–47)
- Martin Štrbák, (1994–99)
- Marián Studenič, (2020–21)
- Jozef Stümpel, (2000–01), Nitra, Slovakia
- Jakub Sukeľ, (2022–22)
- Matúš Sukeľ, (2016–19)
- Filip Surovka, (2010–11)
- Tomáš Surový, (2014–17)
- Ivan Švarný, (2011–19)
- Marek Svatoš, (2012–13)
- Juraj Sýkora, (2002–08)
- Roman Sýkora, (1985–92)
- Pavol Sýkorčin, (1988–91)
- Andrej Szöke, (1996–99)

== T ==
- Ján Tabaček, (2001–13), Bratislava, Slovakia
- Jeff Taffe, (2016–19)
- Tommi Taimi, (2017–18)
- Rudolf Tajcnár, (1967–77)
- Samuel Takáč, (2021–)
- Ján Taraba, (1983–91)
- Radim Tesařík, (2009–10)
- Rok Tičar, (2014–16)
- Dusan Tobolar, (1977–78)
- Roman Tomašech, (1999–2000)
- Róbert Tomík, (1997–99)
- Tomáš Török, (2022–24)
- Brayden Tracey, (2024–25)
- Marek Trončinský, (2013–14)
- Peter Trška, (2010–13)
- Václav Trubač, (2021–22)
- Kirill Tulupov, (2009–10)
- Mikko Turunen, (2009–11)
- Marek Tvrdoň, (2015–16)
- Roman Tvrdoň, (2006–07), Trenčín, Slovakia

== U ==
- Marián Uharček, (1995–96)
- Ľubomír Ujváry, (1969–81)
- Marcel Ulehla, (2005–06), Bratislava, Slovakia
- Roman Ulehla, (1980–83)
- Herbert Ulrich, (1943–45)
- Walter Ulrich, (1945–47)
- Jakub Uram, (2020–21)
- Marek Uram, (2006–11)
- Vladimír Urban, (1977–87)
- Jakub Urbánek, (2019–22)
- Eduard Uvíra, (1985–90)

== V ==
- Ľubomír Vaic, (2008–11), Spišská Nová Ves, Slovakia
- Juraj Valach, (2015–23)
- Jakub Valský, (2016–17)
- Michael Vandas, (2019–20)
- Róbert Varga, (2025–)
- Tibor Varga, (2003–10)
- Roman Veber, (1987–96)
- Rudolf Verčík, (1993–2000)
- Rastislav Veselko, (2007–08)
- Marek Viedenský, (2015–20)
- Otakar Vindyš, (1924–25)
- Patrik Virta, (2018–19)
- Ľubomír Višňovský, (1994-2016), Topoľčany, Slovakia
- Tibor Višňovský, (2003–04)
- Matúš Vizváry, (2008–09)
- Vladimír Vlk, (2002–04)
- Karol Vojtech, (1986–87)
- Michal Vojvoda, (2018–)
- Juraj Volar, (1988–93)
- Michal Vondrka, (2012–15)
- Lukáš Vopelka, (2016–17)
- Tomáš Voráček, (2017–18)
- Marek Vorel, (2006–07)
- Sergei Voronov, (1997–98)
- Jozef Voskár, (1993–99)
- Michal Vrábel, (1994–95)
- Martin Výborný, (2008–09)
- René Vydarený, (2004–05), Bratislava, Slovakia
- Alex Výhonský, (2023–24)

== W ==
- Jozef Wagenhoffer, (2004–07), Bratislava, Slovakia
- Jaroslav Walter, (1964–69)
- Leopold Warzecha, (1974–77)
- Erik Weissmann, (1996–2001)
- Ethan Werek, (2023–24)
- Patrick White, (2014–15)
- Clint Windsor, (2021–22)

== Y ==
- Andrew Yogan, (2021–22)

== Z ==
- Boris Žabka, (1995–99)
- Boris Žabka, (2021–23)
- Pavol Zábojník, (1961–64)
- Vojtech Zeleňák, (2025–)
- František Zelenický, (1970–71)
- Juraj Zemko, (2008–09)
- Tomáš Zigo, (2016–23)
- Dušan Žiška, (1968–84)
- Roman Žitný, (2019–24)
- Anton Zmajkovič, (1975–78)
- Marek Zrnčík, (1992–95)
