= Vladimír Gýna =

Czech ice hockey player

- Born: 27 September 1975 (age 49); Most, Czechoslovakia
- Height: 6 ft 1 in (185 cm)
- Weight: 201 lb (91 kg; 14 st 5 lb)
- Position: Defense
- Shot: Left
- Played for: HC Most; HC Slovan Ústečtí Lvi; KLH Vajgar Jindřichův Hradec; HC Chemopetrol Litvínov; KLH Chomutov; HC Ceske Budejovice; VHK Vsetín; HC Slovan Bratislava; HC Kometa Brno
- NHL draft: Undrafted
- Playing career: 1992–2011

Vladimír Gýna (born 27 September 1975) is a Czech professional ice hockey player who played with HC Slovan Bratislava in the Slovak Extraliga.

== Career statistics ==
			Regular season					Playoffs
Season	Team	League	GP	G	A	Pts	PIM	GP	G	A	Pts	PIM
1992–93	HC Most	Czech3	—	—	—	—	—	—	—	—	—	—
1993–94	HC Slovan Ústí nad Labem	Czech2	—	0	0	0	—	—	—	—	—	—
1994–95	HC Most	Czech3	—	—	—	—	—	—	—	—	—	—
1995–96	HC Most	Czech3	—	—	—	—	—	—	—	—	—	—
1996–97	KLH Vajgar Jindřichův Hradec	Czech2	52	4	3	7	—	—	—	—	—	—
1997–98	HC Chemopetrol Litvinov	Czech	23	0	2	2	12	—	—	—	—	—
1998–99	HC Chemopetrol Litvinov	Czech	38	2	6	8	35	—	—	—	—	—
1998–99	KLH Chomutov	Czech2	1	0	1	1	2	—	—	—	—	—
1999–00	HC Chemopetrol Litvinov	Czech	34	1	6	7	26	7	1	3	4	12
2000–01	HC Chemopetrol Litvinov	Czech	52	4	6	10	34	6	0	2	2	2
2001–02	HC Chemopetrol Litvinov	Czech	45	5	8	13	42	—	—	—	—	—
2002–03	HC Chemopetrol Litvinov	Czech	29	2	2	4	34	—	—	—	—	—
2002–03	HC Ceske Budejovice	Czech	10	1	2	3	6	—	—	—	—	—
2003–04	HC Ceske Budejovice	Czech	30	0	4	4	14	—	—	—	—	—
2004–05	VHK Vsetín	Czech	24	3	4	7	18	—	—	—	—	—
2004–05	HC České Budějovice	Czech2	29	4	6	10	12	11	0	0	0	8
2005–06	HC Chemopetrol Litvinov	Czech	46	2	7	9	24	—	—	—	—	—
2005–06	HC Slovan Bratislava	Slovak	5	1	0	1	0	4	1	0	1	4
2006–07	HC Chemopetrol Litvinov	Czech	44	0	1	1	52	—	—	—	—	—
2007–08	HC Kometa Brno	Czech2	14	1	2	3	22	—	—	—	—	—
2007–08	HC Slovan Ústečtí Lvi	Czech	25	0	2	2	18	—	—	—	—	—
2008–09	HC Slovan Ústečtí Lvi	Czech2	21	0	2	2	8	11	0	1	1	2
2008–09	HC Most	Czech2	10	2	4	6	12	—	—	—	—	—
2008–09	HC Stadion Litomerice	Czech3	3	0	1	1	4	—	—	—	—	—
2009–10	HC Slovan Ústečtí Lvi	Czech2	39	0	8	8	22	9	0	1	1	10
2010–11	HC Most	Czech3	9	1	2	3	6	—	—	—	—	—
Czech totals			400	20	50	70	315	16	1	5	6	14
