= Jan Dresler =

Czech professional ice hockey defenceman

- Born: March 12, 1983 (age 43) Ostrava, Czechoslovakia
- Height: 6 ft 0 in (183 cm)
- Weight: 218 lb (99 kg; 15 st 8 lb)
- Position: Defence
- Shot: Right
- Played for: HC Vítkovice; HC Plzeň; HC Slavia Praha; HC Karlovy Vary; MsHK Žilina; HK 36 Skalica
- Playing career: 2002–2019

Jan Dresler (born March 12, 1983) is a Czech former professional ice hockey defenceman.

Dresler played 466 games in the Czech Extraliga with HC Vítkovice, HC Plzeň, HC Slavia Praha and HC Karlovy Vary.

Dresler also played in the Tipsport Liga in Slovakia for MsHK Žilina and HK 36 Skalica.

== Career statistics ==
			Regular season					Playoffs
Season	Team	League	GP	G	A	Pts	PIM	GP	G	A	Pts	PIM
1999–00	HC Vitkovice U18	Czech U18	39	5	7	12	46	2	0	1	1	4
1999–00	HC Vitkovice U20	Czech U20	2	0	0	0	0	—	—	—	—	—
2000–01	HC Vitkovice U20	Czech U20	46	1	4	5	38	2	0	1	1	4
2001–02	HC Vitkovice U20	Czech U20	41	10	11	21	71	2	0	0	0	0
2001–02	HC Vitkovice	Czech	1	0	0	0	0	—	—	—	—	—
2001–02	HC Nový Jičín	Czech3	4	0	0	0	2	4	0	0	0	2
2002–03	HC Vitkovice U20	Czech U20	14	2	3	5	30	—	—	—	—	—
2002–03	HC Vitkovice	Czech	19	0	2	2	14	6	0	0	0	4
2002–03	HC Slezan Opava	Czech2	17	0	0	0	20	—	—	—	—	—
2003–04	HC Vitkovice U20	Czech U20	5	0	3	3	24	—	—	—	—	—
2003–04	HC Vitkovice	Czech	19	0	0	0	20	—	—	—	—	—
2003–04	HC Slezan Opava	Czech2	22	0	1	1	20	—	—	—	—	—
2003–04	HC Sareza Ostrava	Czech3	—	—	—	—	—	12	1	3	4	6
2004–05	HC Vitkovice	Czech	22	1	1	2	20	6	1	1	2	8
2004–05	HC Havirov Panthers	Czech2	28	0	1	1	36	—	—	—	—	—
2005–06	HC Vitkovice Steel	Czech	40	3	1	4	34	2	0	0	0	0
2005–06	HC Sareza Ostrava	Czech2	1	0	0	0	2	—	—	—	—	—
2006–07	HC Vitkovice Steel	Czech	12	0	0	0	14	—	—	—	—	—
2006–07	HC Sareza Ostrava	Czech2	3	0	1	1	4	—	—	—	—	—
2006–07	HC Havirov Panthers	Czech2	26	3	7	10	93	—	—	—	—	—
2007–08	HC Lasselsberger Plzen	Czech	46	1	2	3	52	4	0	0	0	6
2007–08	HC Berounsti Medvedi	Czech2	1	0	0	0	0	—	—	—	—	—
2008–09	HC Lasselsberger Plzen	Czech	37	0	2	2	28	15	0	1	1	18
2008–09	KLH Chomutov	Czech2	7	1	1	2	16	—	—	—	—	—
2008–09	HC Berounsti Medvedi	Czech2	2	0	0	0	2	—	—	—	—	—
2009–10	HC Plzen 1929	Czech	52	1	2	3	36	6	0	0	0	2
2010–11	HC Plzen 1929	Czech	52	2	1	3	52	4	0	0	0	4
2010–11	Orli Znojmo	Czech2	2	1	0	1	2	—	—	—	—	—
2011–12	HC Plzen 1929	Czech	23	0	1	1	36	—	—	—	—	—
2011–12	HC Slavia Praha	Czech	19	3	4	7	24	—	—	—	—	—
2012–13	HC Slavia Praha	Czech	39	0	0	0	20	3	0	0	0	2
2012–13	HC Berounsti Medvedi	Czech2	4	1	3	4	10	—	—	—	—	—
2013–14	HC Berounsti Medvedi	Czech2	11	1	0	1	18	—	—	—	—	—
2013–14	HC Energie Karlovy Vary	Czech	30	1	3	4	58	—	—	—	—	—
2014–15	HC AZ Havirov 2010	Czech2	10	0	0	0	10	—	—	—	—	—
2014–15	MsHK Zilina	Slovak	36	2	5	7	35	—	—	—	—	—
2014–15	HK 36 Skalica	Slovak	7	1	1	2	6	—	—	—	—	—
2015–16	HC Frydek-Mistek	Czech3	35	4	10	14	85	5	0	0	0	4
2016–17	HK Novy Jicin	Czech3	27	6	8	14	34	—	—	—	—	—
2016–17	HC RT TORAX Poruba 2011	Czech3	10	2	5	7	4	13	0	0	0	14
2017–18	HC RT TORAX Poruba 2011	Czech3	39	2	7	9	69	8	0	3	3	14
2018–19	SHK iClinic Hodonín	Czech3	18	4	7	11	12	5	0	0	0	2
Czech totals			411	12	19	31	408	46	1	2	3	44
Czech2 totals			134	7	14	21	233	—	—	—	—	—
Czech3 totals			133	18	37	55	206	47	1	6	7	42
