= Pavel Zubíček =

Czech ice hockey player

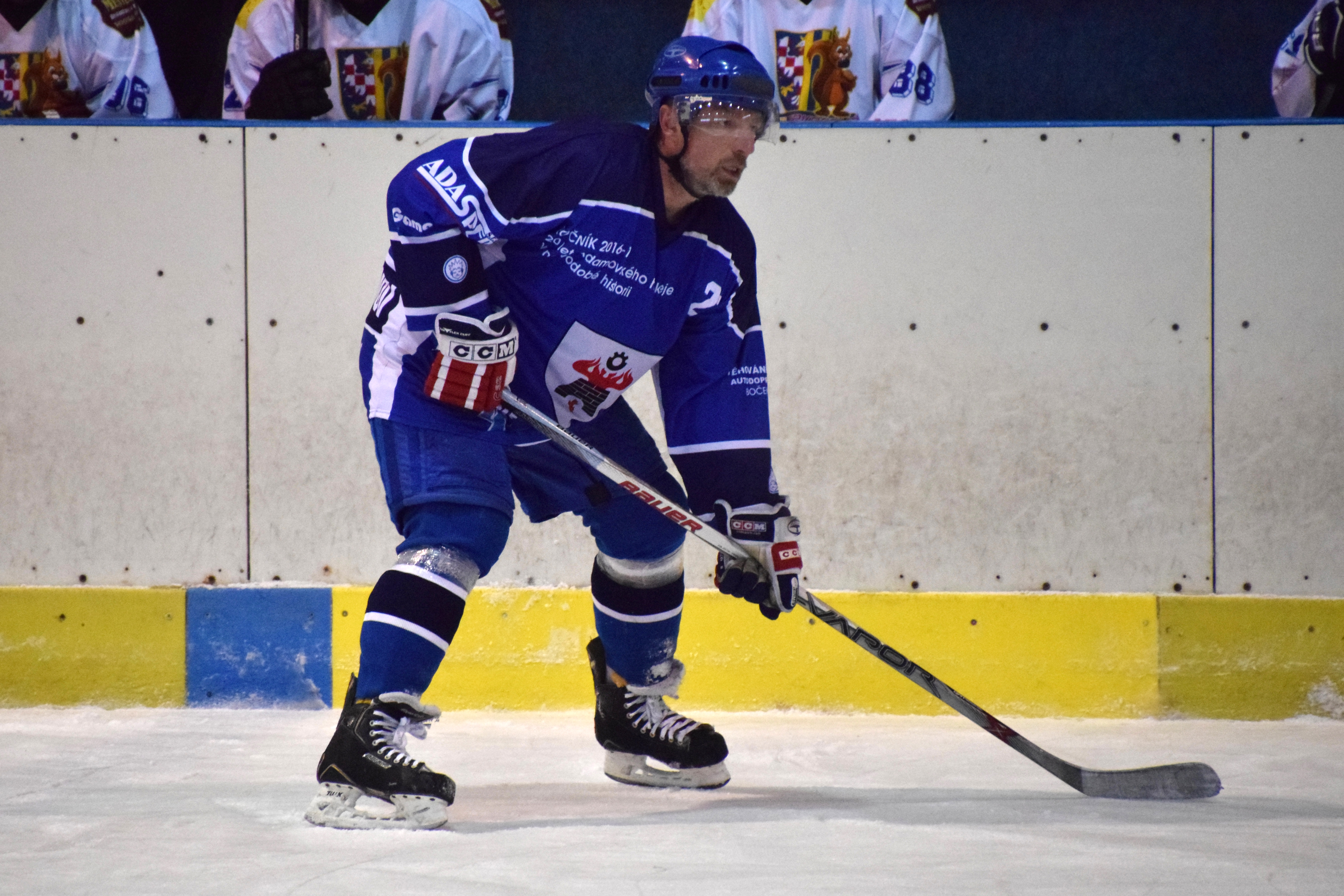
- Born: October 21, 1974 (age 50); Brno, Czechoslovakia
- Height: 5 ft 10 in (178 cm)
- Weight: 181 lb (82 kg; 12 st 13 lb)
- Position: Defence
- Shot: Left
- Played for: HC Kometa Brno; HC Vsetín; HC České Budějovice; HC Hamé Zlín
- NHL draft: Undrafted
- Playing career: 1991–2015

Pavel Zubíček (born 21 October 1974) is a former Czech professional ice hockey defenceman who played in the Czech Extraliga (ELH).

Zubíček played for HC Kometa Brno, HC Vsetín, HC České Budějovice and HC Hamé Zlín.

== Career statistics ==
			Regular season					Playoffs
Season	Team	League	GP	G	A	Pts	PIM	GP	G	A	Pts	PIM
1991–92	HC Brno	Czechoslovakia	18	0	1	1	10	—	—	—	—	—
1992–93	HC Královopolská Brno	Czech2	45	2	3	5	20	—	—	—	—	—
1993–94	HC Královopolská Brno	Czech2	26	1	3	4	14	1	0	0	0	0
1994–95	HC Kometa Brno	Czech2	37	1	9	10	16	5	0	0	0	2
1995–96	HC Kometa Brno	Czech2	33	1	11	12	30	—	—	—	—	—
1996–97	HC Kometa Brno	Czech2	46	1	10	11	69	—	—	—	—	—
1996–97	HC Vsetín	Czech	2	0	0	0	0	7	0	0	0	4
1997–98	HC Vsetín	Czech	47	7	8	15	24	10	0	3	3	10
1998–99	HC Vsetín	Czech	50	5	10	15	28	9	0	0	0	8
1999–00	HC Vsetín	Czech	48	0	6	6	30	7	1	0	1	2
2000–01	HC Vsetín	Czech	24	0	1	1	10	12	2	1	3	12
2000–01	HC Draci Šumperk	Czech2	4	0	2	2	0	—	—	—	—	—
2001–02	HC České Budějovice	Czech	40	0	2	2	24	—	—	—	—	—
2001–02	HC Zlín	Czech	12	3	8	11	8	11	0	2	2	4
2002–03	HC Hamé	Czech	47	2	4	6	26	—	—	—	—	—
2003–04	HC Hamé	Czech	50	2	4	6	69	17	1	4	5	8
2004–05	HC Hamé	Czech	45	3	6	9	34	10	1	2	3	29
2005–06	HC Hamé	Czech	48	2	6	8	50	6	0	1	1	6
2006–07	HC Hamé	Czech	34	1	4	5	34	5	0	0	0	12
2007–08	HC Zlín	Czech	30	1	2	3	51	—	—	—	—	—
2007–08	HC Kometa Brno	Czech2	16	2	4	6	16	9	2	2	4	8
2008–09	HC Kometa Brno	Czech2	45	5	7	12	46	17	1	3	4	6
2009–10	HC Kometa Brno	Czech	27	3	2	5	40	—	—	—	—	—
2010–11	HC Kometa Brno	Czech	35	1	5	6	28	—	—	—	—	—
2014–15	HC Lokomotiva Brno	Czech5	—	—	—	—	—	—	—	—	—	—
Czech totals			572	31	79	110	486	94	5	13	18	95
Czech2 totals			219	12	38	50	181	32	3	5	8	16
