= Mario Cartelli =

Czech ice hockey player (born 1979)

- Born: November 16, 1979 (age 46) Karviná, Czechoslovakia
- Height: 6 ft 1 in (185 cm)
- Weight: 203 lb (92 kg; 14 st 7 lb)
- Position: Defence
- Shot: Right
- Played for: HC Oceláři Třinec; HC Kladno; HC Havířov; HC Plzeň; HC Slovan Bratislava; HC Fassa
- National team: Czech Republic
- NHL draft: 262nd overall, 2001; Atlanta Thrashers
- Playing career: 1998–2014

Mario Cartelli (born 16 November 1979) is a Czech former professional ice hockey defenceman of Italian descent. He was drafted 262nd overall in the 2001 NHL entry draft by the Atlanta Thrashers.

Cartelli played in the Czech Extraliga for HC Oceláři Třinec, HC Kladno, HC Havířov and HC Plzeň. He also played in the Slovak Extraliga for HC Slovan Bratislava and in Serie A for HC Fassa.

== Career statistics ==
=== Regular season and playoffs ===
| | | | Regular season | | | | | Playoffs |
| Season | Team | League | GP | G | A | Pts | PIM | GP | G | A | Pts | PIM |
|---|---|---|---|---|---|---|---|---|---|---|---|---|
| 1994–95 | HC Olomouc | CZE U18 | 31 | 6 | 12 | 18 | — | — | — | — | — | — |
| 1995–96 | HC Olomouc | CZE U18 | 38 | 6 | 7 | 13 | — | — | — | — | — | — |
| 1996–97 | HC Olomouc | CZE U20 | 40 | 0 | 7 | 7 | — | — | — | — | — | — |
| 1997–98 | HC MBL Olomouc | CZE U20 | 37 | 7 | 1 | 8 | — | — | — | — | — | — |
| 1998–99 | HC Železárny Třinec | CZE U20 | — | — | — | — | — | — | — | — | — | — |
| 1998–99 | HC Železárny Třinec | ELH | 34 | 1 | 1 | 2 | 14 | 8 | 2 | 1 | 3 | 4 |
| 1998–99 | HC MBL Olomouc | CZE.2 | 3 | 1 | 1 | 2 | — | — | — | — | — | — |
| 1999–2000 | HC Oceláři Třinec | CZE U20 | 5 | 3 | 0 | 3 | 0 | — | — | — | — | — |
| 1999–2000 | HC Oceláři Třinec | ELH | 42 | 7 | 4 | 11 | 16 | 4 | 0 | 0 | 0 | 0 |
| 2000–01 | HC Oceláři Třinec | ELH | 46 | 11 | 16 | 27 | 24 | — | — | — | — | — |
| 2001–02 | HC Oceláři Třinec | ELH | 20 | 0 | 1 | 1 | 12 | — | — | — | — | — |
| 2001–02 | HC Vagnerplast Kladno | ELH | 24 | 3 | 8 | 11 | 14 | — | — | — | — | — |
| 2001–02 | HC Prostějov | CZE.2 | 3 | 0 | 2 | 2 | 2 | — | — | — | — | — |
| 2002–03 | HC Oceláři Třinec | ELH | 29 | 1 | 9 | 10 | 16 | — | — | — | — | — |
| 2002–03 | HC Havířov Panthers | ELH | 13 | 1 | 4 | 5 | 20 | — | — | — | — | — |
| 2003–04 | HC Lasselsberger Plzeň | ELH | 40 | 4 | 8 | 12 | 24 | 12 | 2 | 4 | 6 | 8 |
| 2004–05 | HC Lasselsberger Plzeň | ELH | 43 | 4 | 10 | 14 | 16 | — | — | — | — | — |
| 2005–06 | HC Lasselsberger Plzeň | ELH | 39 | 6 | 9 | 15 | 26 | — | — | — | — | — |
| 2005–06 | HC Berounští Medvědi | CZE.2 | 1 | 0 | 0 | 0 | 2 | — | — | — | — | — |
| 2006–07 | HC Lasselsberger Plzeň | ELH | 38 | 6 | 10 | 16 | 46 | — | — | — | — | — |
| 2007–08 | HC Lasselsberger Plzeň | ELH | 40 | 5 | 4 | 9 | 67 | 4 | 0 | 0 | 0 | 2 |
| 2008–09 | HC Lasselsberger Plzeň | ELH | 39 | 4 | 5 | 9 | 22 | 11 | 3 | 1 | 4 | 4 |
| 2009–10 | HC Oceláři Třinec | ELH | 49 | 5 | 13 | 18 | 48 | 5 | 0 | 1 | 1 | 2 |
| 2010–11 | HC Oceláři Třinec | ELH | 8 | 0 | 1 | 1 | 2 | — | — | — | — | — |
| 2010–11 | HC Slovan Bratislava | SVK | 32 | 4 | 7 | 11 | 20 | 7 | 0 | 0 | 0 | 8 |
| 2011–12 | HC Oceláři Třinec | ELH | 31 | 0 | 3 | 3 | 16 | — | — | — | — | — |
| 2011–12 | HC VCES Hradec Králové, a.s. | CZE.2 | 3 | 0 | 1 | 1 | 2 | — | — | — | — | — |
| 2012–13 | HC Olomouc | CZE.2 | 19 | 1 | 8 | 9 | 10 | — | — | — | — | — |
| 2012–13 | HC Fassa | ITA | 18 | 2 | 11 | 13 | 2 | — | — | — | — | — |
| 2013–14 | HC Olomouc | CZE.2 | 27 | 2 | 4 | 6 | 24 | 6 | 0 | 3 | 3 | 4 |
| ELH totals | | | 535 | 58 | 106 | 164 | 383 | 44 | 7 | 7 | 14 | 20 |

=== International ===
| Year | Team | Event | GP | G | A | Pts | PIM |
|---|---|---|---|---|---|---|---|
| 1997 | Czech Republic | EJC | 3 | 0 | 2 | 2 | 0 |
| 1999 | Czech Republic | WJC | 6 | 0 | 2 | 2 | 4 |
| Junior totals | | | 9 | 0 | 4 | 4 | 4 |
