= Vladimír Škoda =

Czech ice hockey player

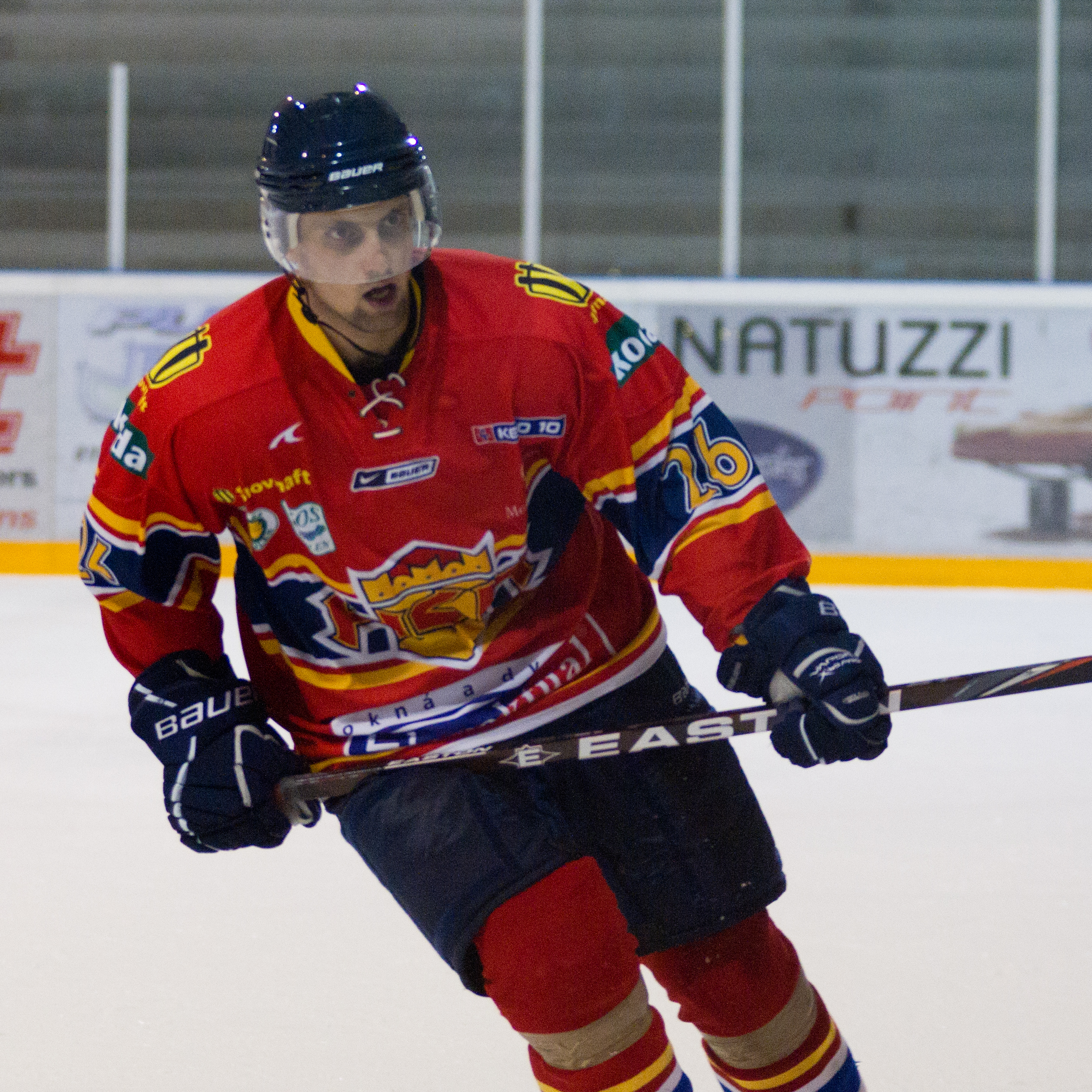
- Born: October 9, 1983 (age 41); České Budějovice, Czechoslovakia
- Height: 5 ft 11 in (180 cm)
- Weight: 187 lb (85 kg; 13 st 5 lb)
- Position: Centre
- Shoots: Left
- Slovak Extraliga team: HKm Zvolen
- NHL draft: Undrafted
- Playing career: 2002–present

Vladimír Škoda (born October 9, 1983) is a Czech professional ice hockey player who is currently playing for HKm Zvolen in the Slovak Extraliga.

== Career statistics ==
			Regular season					Playoffs
Season	Team	League	GP	G	A	Pts	PIM	GP	G	A	Pts	PIM
1998–99	HC České Budějovice U18	Czech U18	—	—	—	—	—	—	—	—	—	—
1999–00	HC České Budějovice U18	Czech U18	45	26	14	40	12	6	1	2	3	0
1999–00	HC České Budějovice U20	Czech U20	1	0	0	0	0	—	—	—	—	—
2000–01	HC České Budějovice U20	Czech U20	44	17	11	28	28	5	0	0	0	0
2001–02	Oshawa Generals	OHL	37	3	8	11	0	—	—	—	—	—
2001–02	Sault Ste. Marie Greyhounds	OHL	24	5	4	9	8	5	0	0	0	0
2002–03	HC České Budějovice U20	Czech U20	16	10	15	25	2	—	—	—	—	—
2002–03	HC České Budějovice	Czech	26	1	1	2	10	1	0	0	0	0
2003–04	HC České Budějovice U20	Czech U20	6	0	3	3	4	—	—	—	—	—
2003–04	HC České Budějovice	Czech	33	0	4	4	4	—	—	—	—	—
2003–04	IHC Písek	Czech2	16	6	4	10	6	—	—	—	—	—
2004–05	SK Horácká Slavia Třebíč	Czech2	45	8	13	21	16	—	—	—	—	—
2004–05	KLH Vajgar Jindřichův Hradec	Czech3	—	—	—	—	—	9	7	2	9	2
2005–06	KLH Vajgar Jindřichův Hradec	Czech2	45	5	6	11	32	—	—	—	—	—
2006–07	Vsetínská hokejová	Czech	18	3	0	3	10	—	—	—	—	—
2006–07	HC Znojemští Orli	Czech	7	1	0	1	2	—	—	—	—	—
2006–07	HK Jestřábi Prostějov	Czech2	7	2	1	3	8	—	—	—	—	—
2006–07	HC Havířov Panthers	Czech2	15	10	3	13	6	—	—	—	—	—
2007–08	HC Vítkovice	Czech	9	2	1	3	4	—	—	—	—	—
2007–08	HC Havířov Panthers	Czech2	43	13	28	41	20	4	1	1	2	0
2008–09	MsHK Zilina	Slovak	58	21	11	32	42	—	—	—	—	—
2009–10	MsHK Zilina	Slovak	44	13	10	23	8	—	—	—	—	—
2010–11	HKM Zvolen	Slovak	57	10	8	18	24	5	0	0	0	25
2011–12	MHC Martin	Slovak	45	15	13	28	24	—	—	—	—	—
2012–13	MsHK Zilina	Slovak	40	21	16	37	36	—	—	—	—	—
2012–13	HC Mountfield	Czech	4	0	0	0	0	4	1	1	2	0
2013–14	Mountfield HK	Czech	43	5	5	10	12	4	1	2	3	0
2014–15	HK Almaty	Kazakhstan	53	11	15	26	22	7	0	2	2	2
2015–16	HC Motor České Budějovice	Czech2	19	3	2	5	0	—	—	—	—	—
2015–16	MsHK Zilina	Slovak	19	7	11	18	6	4	0	0	0	0
2016–17	HC Motor České Budějovice	Czech2	52	17	8	25	26	9	1	1	2	6
2017–18	HC Nove Zamky	Slovak	43	4	8	12	20	4	0	2	2	0
2018–19	ESV Waldkirchen	Germany5	—	—	—	—	—	—	—	—	—	—
2019–20	ESV Waldkirchen	Germany5	32	43	31	74	8	—	—	—	—	—
2020–21	HC Tábor	Czech3	3	0	0	0	4	—	—	—	—	—
2021–22	HC Tábor	Czech3	16	4	10	14	4	—	—	—	—	—
Czech totals			140	12	11	23	42	9	2	3	5	0
Czech2 totals			242	64	65	129	114	13	2	2	4	6
Slovak totals			306	91	77	168	160	13	0	2	2	25
