= Jiří Kučný =

Czech ice hockey player

- Born: November 17, 1983 (age 41); Vsetín, Czechoslovakia
- Height: 6 ft 1 in (185 cm)
- Weight: 196 lb (89 kg; 14 st 0 lb)
- Position: Defence
- Shot: Left
- Played for: HC Vsetin; SK Kadaň; HC Ocelari Trinec; SK Horacka Slavia Trebic; MsHK Zilina; HC Zlin; HKm Zvolen; HC Sparta Praha; HC Slovan Ustecti Lvi; Piráti Chomutov; HC Berounsti Medvedi; BK Mlada Boleslav; Motor České Budějovice; HC Slavia Praha; HC Slovan Bratislava
- Playing career: 2002–2020

Jiří Kučný is a Czech professional ice hockey defenceman who is currently playing for HKm Zvolen in the Slovak Extraliga.

== Career statistics ==
			Regular season					Playoffs
Season	Team	League	GP	G	A	Pts	PIM	GP	G	A	Pts	PIM
1999–00	HC Vsetin U18	Czech U18	46	8	13	21	71	2	1	2	3	0
1999–00	HC Vsetin U20	Czech U20	1	0	0	0	0	—	—	—	—	—
2000–01	HC Vsetin U20	Czech U20	44	1	6	7	32	8	0	0	0	20
2001–02	HC Vsetin U20	Czech U20	48	2	12	14	88	2	1	0	1	0
2002–03	HC Vsetin U20	Czech U20	32	7	7	14	130	9	0	2	2	4
2002–03	HC Vsetin	Czech	9	0	0	0	6	—	—	—	—	—
2002–03	SK Kadaň	Czech2	6	1	1	2	8	—	—	—	—	—
2003–04	HC Vsetin U20	Czech U20	9	2	2	4	28	7	2	3	5	6
2003–04	Vsetínská hokejová	Czech	1	0	0	0	0	—	—	—	—	—
2003–04	SK Horácká Slavia Třebíč	Czech2	34	3	11	14	87	5	1	1	2	20
2004–05	HC Oceláři Třinec	Czech	3	0	0	0	2	—	—	—	—	—
2004–05	SK Horácká Slavia Třebíč	Czech2	35	0	7	7	42	—	—	—	—	—
2005–06	Vsetínská hokejová	Czech	45	3	5	8	76	—	—	—	—	—
2006–07	Vsetínská hokejová	Czech	38	1	8	9	98	—	—	—	—	—
2007–08	MsHK Zilina	Slovak	53	5	11	16	65	4	1	0	1	12
2008–09	HC Zlín	Czech	48	1	4	5	56	5	0	0	0	33
2009–10	HC Zlín	Czech	27	0	1	1	64	4	0	1	1	6
2010–11	HC Zlín	Czech	4	0	0	0	6	—	—	—	—	—
2010–11	HKM Zvolen	Slovak	17	1	1	2	14	4	0	0	0	4
2011–12	HC Sparta Praha	Czech	45	0	4	4	36	1	0	0	0	0
2011–12	HC Slovan Ústečtí Lvi	Czech2	7	1	4	5	6	—	—	—	—	—
2012–13	HC Slavia Praha	Czech	48	1	5	6	40	11	0	3	3	12
2013–14	Piráti Chomutov	Czech	21	0	2	2	14	—	—	—	—	—
2013–14	HC Berounsti Medvedi	Czech2	6	1	2	3	2	—	—	—	—	—
2014–15	BK Mladá Boleslav	Czech	26	0	3	3	52	9	1	0	1	14
2015–16	BK Mladá Boleslav	Czech	43	0	4	4	66	10	0	1	1	43
2016–17	BK Mladá Boleslav	Czech	41	2	4	6	12	5	0	1	1	6
2017–18	Motor České Budějovice	Czech2	28	1	4	5	28	3	0	0	0	12
2018–19	MsHK Zilina	Slovak	56	4	18	22	100	—	—	—	—	—
2019–20	HC Slavia Praha	Czech2	10	0	0	0	22	—	—	—	—	—
2019–20	HC Slovan Bratislava	Slovak	19	1	0	1	12	—	—	—	—	—
Czech totals			399	8	40	48	528	45	1	6	7	114
Slovak totals			145	11	30	41	191	8	1	0	1	16
