= Martin Hlavačka =

Czech ice hockey player

- Born: September 21, 1975 (age 50) Hodonín, Czechoslovakia
- Height: 5 ft 11 in (180 cm)
- Weight: 198 lb (90 kg; 14 st 2 lb)
- Position: Defender
- Shot: Left
- Played for: SHK Hodonin; HC Prerov; AC ZPS Zlín; MHK Dubnica; HK Dukla Trencin; HC Becherovka Karlovy Vary; Graz 99ers Ilves; Lokomotiv Yaroslavl; HC Sparta Praha; Bili Tygri Liberec; HC Slavia Praha; HC Slovan Bratislava; HK Nitra; HC Brumov-Bylnice
- National team: Czech Republic
- Playing career: 1992–2012

Martin Hlavačka (born September 21, 1975) is a Czech professional ice hockey player who played with HC Slovan Bratislava in the Slovak Extraliga. He currently plays for HK Nitra. Hlavačka previously played for HC Dukla Trenčín in Slovakia and several teams in Czech Extraliga, namely HC Zlín, HC Karlovy Vary, HC Sparta Praha, HC Bílí Tygři Liberec and HC Slavia Praha. He also played for Ilves Tampere in Finland and Torpedo Yaroslavl in Russia.

== Career statistics ==
			Regular season					Playoffs
Season	Team	League	GP	G	A	Pts	PIM	GP	G	A	Pts	PIM
1992–93	SHK Hodonín	Czech2	4	0	2	2	—	—	—	—	—	—
1993–94	SHK Hodonín	Czech2	26	12	5	17	—	—	—	—	—	—
1994–95	SHK Hodonín	Czech2	—	—	—	—	—	—	—	—	—	—
1994–95	HC Prerov	Czech3	13	2	2	4	12	—	—	—	—	—
1995–96	HC Prerov	Czech2	13	2	2	4	—	—	—	—	—	—
1995–96	AC ZPS Zlín	Czech	4	0	0	0	0	—	—	—	—	—
1996–97	MHK Dubnica	Slovak	50	8	9	17	36	—	—	—	—	—
1997–98	MHK Dubnica	Slovak2	30	5	4	9	24	—	—	—	—	—
1998–99	MHK Dubnica	Slovak	28	3	5	8	71	—	—	—	—	—
1999–00	HK Dukla Trenčín	Slovak	48	4	10	14	96	—	—	—	—	—
2000–01	HK Dukla Trenčín	Slovak	55	9	25	34	78	—	—	—	—	—
2001–02	HC Becherovka Karlovy Vary	Czech	51	12	12	24	105	—	—	—	—	—
2002–03	HC Becherovka Karlovy Vary	Czech	52	8	24	32	94	—	—	—	—	—
2002–03	Graz 99ers	Austria	2	1	3	4	2	3	0	0	0	2
2003–04	Ilves	Liiga	26	1	3	4	40	—	—	—	—	—
2003–04	Lokomotiv Yaroslavl	Russia	26	4	0	4	30	3	1	1	2	6
2004–05	HC Energie Karlovy Vary	Czech	50	7	20	27	77	—	—	—	—	—
2005–06	HC Sparta Praha	Czech	16	3	1	4	34	—	—	—	—	—
2005–06	Bili Tygri Liberec	Czech	15	4	5	9	36	5	0	1	1	8
2006–07	Bili Tygri Liberec	Czech	6	2	0	2	10	—	—	—	—	—
2006–07	HC Slavia Praha	Czech	49	7	12	19	52	6	0	0	0	12
2007–08	HC Slavia Praha	Czech	38	4	12	16	18	—	—	—	—	—
2007–08	RI Okna Zlin	Czech	8	0	2	2	28	—	—	—	—	—
2008–09	PSG Zlin	Czech	1	0	0	0	2	—	—	—	—	—
2008–09	HC Slovan Bratislava	Slovak	12	1	6	7	31	—	—	—	—	—
2009–10	HK Dukla Trencin	Slovak	23	8	6	14	48	—	—	—	—	—
2010–11	HK Dukla Trencin	Slovak	15	0	5	5	24	—	—	—	—	—
2010–11	HK Nitra	Slovak	27	1	5	6	96	—	—	—	—	—
2011–12	HC Brumov-Bylnice	Czech4	2	1	0	1	6	—	—	—	—	—
2011–12	SHK Hodonín	Czech3	31	4	19	23	70	12	3	8	11	16
Czech totals			290	47	88	135	456	11	0	1	1	20
Slovak totals			258	34	71	105	480	—	—	—	—	—
