= Daniel Seman =

- Born: January 1, 1979 (age 46) Mostiště, Czech Republic
- Height: 6 ft 0 in (183 cm)
- Weight: 194 lb (88 kg; 13 st 12 lb)
- Position: Defence
- Shot: Left
- NHL draft: Undrafted
- Playing career: 1997–2017

Daniel Seman (born January 1, 1979) is a Czech former professional ice hockey defenceman.

Seman played in the Czech Extraliga for HC Vítkovice Steel, HC Oceláři Třinec and HC Plzeň. He also played with HC Slovan Bratislava in the Slovak Extraliga.

== Career statistics ==
			Regular season					Playoffs
Season	Team	League	GP	G	A	Pts	PIM	GP	G	A	Pts	PIM
1995–96	AZ Havirov U18	Czech U18	36	2	8	10	—	—	—	—	—	—
1996–97	AZ Havirov U20	Czech U20	—	—	—	—	—	—	—	—	—	—
1997–98	HC Vitkovice	Czech	3	0	0	0	0	5	1	1	2	0
1998–99	HC Vitkovice U20	Czech U20	—	—	—	—	—	—	—	—	—	—
1998–99	HC Vitkovice	Czech	1	0	0	0	2	4	0	0	0	6
1998–99	HC Havirov	Czech2	—	—	—	—	—	—	—	—	—	—
1999–00	HC Vitkovice U20	Czech U20	1	0	0	0	0	1	0	0	0	0
1999–00	HC Vitkovice	Czech	50	2	2	4	42	—	—	—	—	—
2000–01	HC Vitkovice	Czech	35	0	2	2	42	—	—	—	—	—
2000–01	HC Slezan Opava	Czech2	1	0	0	0	0	—	—	—	—	—
2000–01	HC Ytong Brno	Czech	3	0	0	0	2	—	—	—	—	—
2001–02	HC Vitkovice	Czech	37	2	3	5	32	14	3	1	4	39
2001–02	HC Slezan Opava	Czech2	5	0	1	1	8	—	—	—	—	—
2002–03	HC Slovan Bratislava	Slovak	39	2	9	11	38	—	—	—	—	—
2003–04	HC Vitkovice	Czech	42	3	5	8	38	6	0	1	1	2
2004–05	HC Vitkovice	Czech	36	2	4	6	24	10	0	0	0	8
2004–05	HC Ostrava	Czech2	1	1	0	1	0	—	—	—	—	—
2005–06	HL Anyang	Asia League	35	3	7	10	48	4	0	0	0	4
2006–07	HC Oceláři Třinec	Czech	40	3	3	6	38	9	0	0	0	4
2007–08	HC Oceláři Třinec	Czech	45	6	4	10	42	8	0	0	0	4
2008–09	HC Oceláři Třinec	Czech	38	5	8	13	24	5	0	0	0	2
2009–10	HC Oceláři Třinec	Czech	50	5	15	20	50	5	0	0	0	4
2010–11	HC Oceláři Třinec	Czech	36	6	10	16	24	17	0	3	3	4
2011–12	HC Oceláři Třinec	Czech	7	0	1	1	4	1	0	0	0	0
2012–13	HC Berkut	Ukraine	14	2	10	12	22	—	—	—	—	—
2013–14	HC Plzeň	Czech	28	1	1	2	6	5	0	1	1	2
2014–15	HK Neman Grodno	Belarus	30	4	11	15	30	9	1	1	2	10
2015–16	HK Neman Grodno	Belarus	32	4	14	18	26	11	2	5	7	67
2016–17	HC AZ Havířov 2010	Czech2	40	3	10	13	38	—	—	—	—	—
Czech totals			448	35	58	93	342	92	4	7	11	75
