= Aleš Krátoška =

Czech ice hockey forward

- Born: October 6, 1974 (age 51) Pacov, Czechoslovakia
- Height: 5 ft 10 in (178 cm)
- Weight: 183 lb (83 kg; 13 st 1 lb)
- Position: Centre
- Shot: Left
- Played for: HC Vítkovice; Ässät; Pelicans; HC Plzeň; HC Slavia Praha; HC Karlovy Vary; Motor České Budějovice; Trondheim Black Panthers
- Playing career: 1993–2009

Aleš Krátoška (born October 6, 1974) is a Czech former professional ice hockey centre.

Krátoška played a total of the 384 games in the Czech Extraliga, playing for HC Vítkovice, HC Plzeň, HC Slavia Praha, HC Karlovy Vary and Motor České Budějovice. He also played in the SM-liiga for Ässät and Pelicans and the GET-ligaen for the Trondheim Black Panthers.

== Career statistics ==
			Regular season					Playoffs
Season	Team	League	GP	G	A	Pts	PIM	GP	G	A	Pts	PIM
1990–91	Motor Ceske Budejovice U18	Czechoslovakia U18	36	42	36	78	—	—	—	—	—	—
1992–93	HC Ceske Budejovice U18	Czechoslovakia U18	—	—	—	—	—	—	—	—	—	—
1993–94	HC Tábor	Czech2	—	5	6	11	—	—	—	—	—	—
1994–95	HC Tábor	Czech2	—	14	16	30	—	—	—	—	—	—
1995–96	HC Písek	Czech2	37	22	9	31	—	—	—	—	—	—
1996–97	HC Vítkovice	Czech	44	10	11	21	38	7	0	0	0	0
1997–98	HC Vítkovice	Czech	38	8	6	14	32	9	2	2	4	18
1997–98	HC Havířov	Czech2	2	0	0	0	0	—	—	—	—	—
1998–99	HC Vítkovice	Czech	47	15	16	31	26	4	1	1	2	2
1999–00	Porin Ässät	SM-liiga	53	17	18	35	81	—	—	—	—	—
2000–01	Lahti Pelicans	SM-liiga	51	17	17	34	76	3	0	0	0	8
2001–02	HC Plzeň	Czech	33	6	9	15	57	—	—	—	—	—
2002–03	HC Plzeň	Czech	13	4	1	5	18	—	—	—	—	—
2002–03	HC Slavia Praha	Czech	37	5	15	20	50	13	3	10	13	12
2003–04	HC Plzeň	Czech	31	10	8	18	76	—	—	—	—	—
2003–04	HC Slavia Praha	Czech	15	2	5	7	18	18	2	5	7	16
2004–05	HC Slavia Praha	Czech	6	0	0	0	2	—	—	—	—	—
2004–05	HC Energie Karlovy Vary	Czech	28	3	5	8	18	—	—	—	—	—
2005–06	HC České Budějovice	Czech	41	1	7	8	39	—	—	—	—	—
2005–06	BK Mladá Boleslav	Czech	8	2	5	7	6	10	1	4	5	32
2006–07	Trondheim Black Panthers	Norway	37	26	22	48	135	—	—	—	—	—
2007–08	Landshut Cannibals	Germany2	50	14	24	38	60	13	5	5	10	14
2008–09	Landshut Cannibals	Germany2	47	10	24	34	50	6	0	1	1	4
Czech totals			333	64	83	147	373	51	8	18	26	48
SM-liiga totals			104	34	35	69	157	3	0	0	0	8
