= Roman Kaděra =

Czech professional ice hockey player (born 1973)

- Born: February 9, 1973 (age 52); Jihlava, Czechoslovakia
- Height: 6 ft 0 in (183 cm)
- Weight: 194 lb (88 kg; 13 st 12 lb)
- Position: Right wing
- Shot: Right
- Played for: HC Olomouc; HC Vitkovice; HC Trinec; HC Slavia Praha; HC Znojemsti Orli; HC Litvinov; HC Dukla Jihlava; HC Havirov; HC Slovan Bratislava; Rapperswil-Jona Lakers; Wölfe Freiburg; Höchstadter EC
- National team: Czech Republic
- Playing career: 1992–2010

Roman Kaděra (born 9 February 1973) is a Czech professional ice hockey player who played with HC Slovan Bratislava in the Slovak Extraliga.

Kaděra also played previously for HC Olomouc, HC Vítkovice, HC Oceláři Třinec, HC Slavia Praha, HC Znojemští Orli, HC Chemopetrol Litvínov and HC Dukla Jihlava.

== Career statistics ==
			Regular season					Playoffs
Season	Team	League	GP	G	A	Pts	PIM	GP	G	A	Pts	PIM
1992–93	HC Olomouc	Czech	36	12	10	22	—	—	—	—	—	—
1993–94	HC Vitkovice	Czech	42	13	21	34	16	5	1	3	4	2
1994–95	HC Vitkovice	Czech	43	18	18	36	74	1	1	1	2	2
1995–96	HC Trinec	Czech	34	11	25	36	84	3	0	1	1	0
1996–97	HC Slavia Praha	Czech	25	5	6	11	38	—	—	—	—	—
1996–97	HC Trinec	Czech	18	8	9	17	36	4	0	0	0	2
1997–98	HC Trinec	Czech	50	24	36	60	84	8	3	7	10	14
1998–99	HC Trinec	Czech	30	9	17	26	44	—	—	—	—	—
1998–99	HC Znojemsti Orli	Czech2	18	10	11	21	64	—	—	—	—	—
1999–00	HC Trinec	Czech	17	6	13	19	64	—	—	—	—	—
2000–01	HC Vitkovice	Czech	49	18	14	32	32	10	3	2	5	12
2001–02	HC Vitkovice	Czech	50	15	18	33	82	14	5	5	10	26
2002–03	HC Vitkovice	Czech	48	24	20	44	66	6	1	3	4	10
2003–04	HC Vitkovice	Czech	27	9	9	18	30	—	—	—	—	—
2003–04	HC Litvinov	Czech	13	1	4	5	18	—	—	—	—	—
2004–05	HC Dukla Jihlava	Czech	17	4	4	8	26	—	—	—	—	—
2004–05	HC Havirov	Czech2	4	4	2	6	12	—	—	—	—	—
2005–06	HC Slovan Bratislava	Slovak	6	0	2	2	16	—	—	—	—	—
2005–06	Rapperswil-Jona Lakers	NLA	5	0	0	0	0	—	—	—	—	—
2007–08	Wölfe Freiburg	Germany3	8	5	11	16	28	11	6	8	14	6
2008–09	Wölfe Freiburg	Germany2	44	16	47	63	84	1	1	0	1	25
2009–10	Höchstadter EC	Germany4	1	0	0	0	0	—	—	—	—	—
Czech totals			499	177	224	401	694	51	14	22	36	68
