= Jan Srdínko =

- Born: February 22, 1974 (age 51); Benešov, Czechoslovakia
- Height: 6 ft 0 in (183 cm)
- Weight: 194 lb (88 kg; 13 st 12 lb)
- Position: Defender
- Shot: Left
- Played for: HC VS VTJ Tábor; HC Železárny Třinec; HC Kometa Brno; HC Vsetin; HC Sparta Praha; Sibir Novosibirsk; Leksands IF; HC Slovan Bratislava; HC Kladno
- National team: Czech Republic
- NHL draft: 241st overall, 1997; New Jersey Devils
- Playing career: 1994–2009

Jan Srdínko (born February 22, 1974) is a former Czech professional ice hockey player. Srdinko most recently was a member of HC Slovan Bratislava in the Slovak Extraliga. Srdinko also played for HC Vsetín, HC Sparta Praha, Leksands IF and HC Kladno. Srdinko has been a member of six Czech Extraliga championship teams at HC Vsetín and once with HC Sparta.

== Career statistics ==
			Regular season					Playoffs
Season	Team	League	GP	G	A	Pts	PIM	GP	G	A	Pts	PIM
1993–94	HC VS VTJ Tábor	Czech2	—	0	—	—	—	—	—	—	—	—
1994–95	HC Železárny Třinec	Czech2	—	1	1	2	—	—	—	—	—	—
1994–95	HC Kometa Brno	Czech2	11	1	4	5	6	6	1	0	1	6
1994–95	HC Vsetin	Czech	1	0	0	0	2	—	—	—	—	—
1995–96	HC Vsetin	Czech	31	1	4	5	24	9	0	0	0	6
1996–97	HC Vsetin	Czech	48	2	8	10	67	10	0	3	3	14
1997–98	HC Vsetin	Czech	46	1	5	6	60	10	0	3	3	4
1998–99	HC Vsetin	Czech	49	2	6	8	54	12	0	1	1	31
1999–00	HC Vsetin	Czech	48	3	10	13	52	9	2	0	2	29
2000–01	HC Vsetin	Czech	47	8	9	17	81	14	1	1	2	22
2001–02	HC Sparta Praha	Czech	50	6	5	11	100	2	0	0	0	0
2002–03	HC Sparta Praha	Czech	51	3	4	7	44	10	0	1	1	14
2003–04	HC Sparta Praha	Czech	47	2	4	6	46	10	0	0	0	10
2004–05	Sibir Novosibirsk	Russia	56	2	4	6	48	—	—	—	—	—
2005–06	Leksands IF	SHL	45	0	0	0	75	8	1	3	4	8
2006–07	HC Slovan Bratislava	Slovak	47	5	5	10	74	14	1	3	4	26
2007–08	HC Slovan Bratislava	Slovak	46	5	8	13	48	18	1	1	2	18
2008–09	HC Kladno	Czech	12	0	0	0	14	—	—	—	—	—
2008–09	HC Slovan Bratislava	Slovak	18	1	6	7	16	—	—	—	—	—
Czech totals			430	28	55	83	544	86	3	9	12	130
Slovak totals			111	11	19	30	138	32	2	4	6	44
