= Daniel Babka =

Slovak ice hockey player

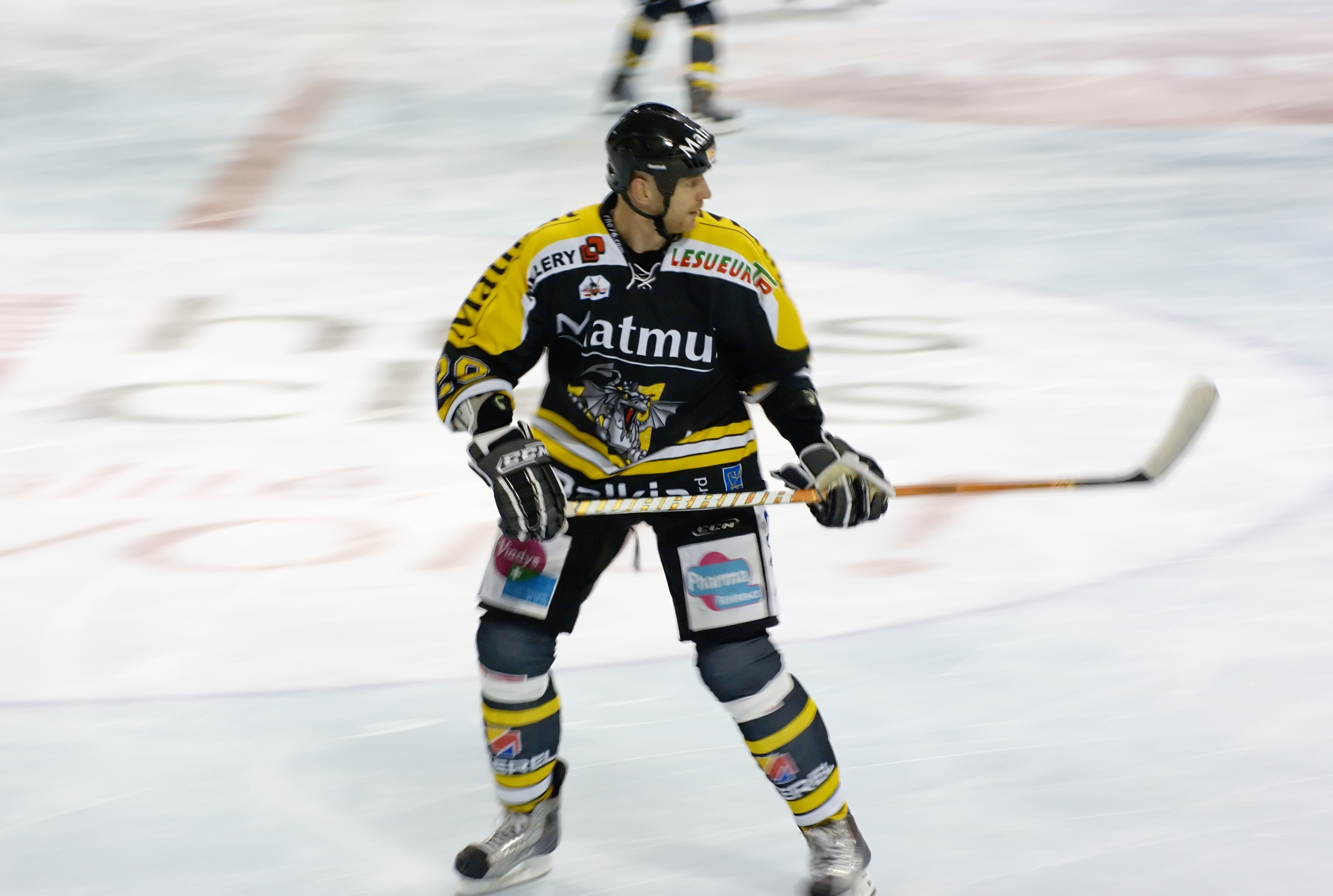
- Babka in 2010 for Dragons de Rouen
- Born: March 30, 1972 (age 54) Martin, Czechoslovakia
- Height: 6 ft 5 in (196 cm)
- Weight: 229 lb (104 kg; 16 st 5 lb)
- Position: Defence
- Shot: Left
- Played for: HK Dukla Trenčín; MHC Martin; HC Košice; Motor České Budějovice; HC Slovan Bratislava; HKm Zvolen; Dragons de Rouen
- National team: Slovakia
- NHL draft: Undrafted
- Playing career: 1992–2017

Daniel Babka (born March 30, 1972) is a Slovak former professional ice hockey defenceman.

Babka played in the Slovak Extraliga for HK Dukla Trenčín, MHC Martin, HC Košice, HC Slovan Bratislava and HKm Zvolen. He also played in the Czech Extraliga for Motor České Budějovice and in the Ligue Magnus in France for Dragons de Rouen.

Babka also played internationally for the Slovakia national team and played in the 1997 and 1999 Ice Hockey World Championships.

== Career statistics ==
			Regular season					Playoffs
Season	Team	League	GP	G	A	Pts	PIM	GP	G	A	Pts	PIM
1992–93	HK Dukla Trencin	Czechoslovakia	2	0	1	1	—	—	—	—	—	—
1993–94	MHC Martin	Slovak	35	3	3	6	—	—	—	—	—	—
1994–95	MHC Martin	Slovak	36	5	2	7	40	3	0	0	0	8
1995–96	MHC Martin	Slovak	45	3	13	16	46	—	—	—	—	—
1996–97	MHC Martin	Slovak	51	14	22	36	40	—	—	—	—	—
1997–98	HC Košice	Slovak	26	1	5	6	16	—	—	—	—	—
1998–99	HC Kosice	Slovak	51	6	4	10	82	—	—	—	—	—
1999–00	HC České Budějovice	Czech	3	0	0	0	6	—	—	—	—	—
1999–00	HC Slovan Bratislava	Slovak	54	4	8	12	46	8	0	0	0	14
2000–01	HC Slovan Bratislava	Slovak	47	11	10	21	65	8	2	2	4	10
2001–02	HC Slovan Bratislava	Slovak	45	6	12	18	55	—	—	—	—	—
2002–03	HC České Budějovice	Czech	52	10	10	20	79	4	0	0	0	8
2003–04	HC České Budějovice	Czech	24	2	6	8	26	—	—	—	—	—
2003–04	HKM Zvolen	Slovak	20	4	13	17	8	17	4	7	11	32
2004–05	HKM Zvolen	Slovak	48	8	12	20	104	17	3	6	9	64
2005–06	HKM Zvolen	Slovak	54	11	35	46	82	4	1	1	2	22
2006–07	HKM Zvolen	Slovak	54	16	22	38	98	10	2	2	4	20
2007–08	HKM Zvolen	Slovak	54	4	18	22	66	5	0	1	1	35
2008–09	HC Kosice	Slovak	6	0	3	3	2	—	—	—	—	—
2008–09	MHC Martin	Slovak	41	6	12	18	80	5	0	2	2	12
2009–10	Dragons de Rouen	Ligue Magnus	25	5	11	16	36	11	0	6	6	12
2010–11	Dragons de Rouen	Ligue Magnus	16	2	7	9	28	8	1	1	2	2
2011–12	Dragons de Rouen II	France3	11	1	7	8	10	—	—	—	—	—
2016–17	Ducs de Dijon II	France4	1	0	0	0	0	—	—	—	—	—
Czech totals			79	12	16	28	111	4	0	0	0	8
Slovak totals			667	102	194	296	830	77	12	21	33	217
