= Tomas Chlubna =

Czech ice hockey player (born 1972)

- Born: November 6, 1972 (age 53) Jihlava, Czechoslovakia
- Height: 6 ft 1 in (185 cm)
- Weight: 212 lb (96 kg; 15 st 2 lb)
- Position: Left wing
- Shot: Left
- Played for: HC Dukla Jihlava; HC Vítkovice; HC Železárny Třinec; HC Karlovy Vary; JYP; Metallurg Magnitogorsk; Severstal Cherepovets; Tappara; HC Znojemští Orli; HC Slovan Bratislava; Vålerenga Ishockey; Yunost Minsk; HK Riga 2000
- National team: Czech Republic
- Playing career: 1990–2012

Tomas Chlubna (born November 6, 1972) is a Czech former professional ice hockey player.

Chlubna played in the Czech Extraliga for HC Dukla Jihlava, HC Vítkovice, HC Železárny Třinec, HC Karlovy Vary and HC Znojemští Orli. He also played in the SM-liiga for JYP Jyväskylä and Tappara, the Russian Superleague for Metallurg Magnitogorsk and Severstal Cherepovets and the Slovak Extraliga for HC Slovan Bratislava.

== Career statistics ==
| | | | Regular season | | | | | Playoffs |
| Season | Team | League | GP | G | A | Pts | PIM | GP | G | A | Pts | PIM |
|---|---|---|---|---|---|---|---|---|---|---|---|---|
| 1990–91 | ASD Dukla Jihlava | Czechoslovakia | 2 | 0 | 0 | 0 | 0 | — | — | — | — | — |
| 1991–92 | ASD Dukla Jihlava | Czechoslovakia | 32 | 6 | 2 | 8 | — | 6 | 1 | 0 | 1 | — |
| 1992–93 | ASD Dukla Jihlava | Czechoslovakia | 34 | 13 | 5 | 18 | — | — | — | — | — | — |
| 1993–94 | ASD Dukla Jihlava | Czech | 23 | 5 | 4 | 9 | 2 | — | — | — | — | — |
| 1994–95 | HC Vitkovice | Czech | 18 | 6 | 3 | 9 | 10 | — | — | — | — | — |
| 1994–95 | BK Havlíčkův Brod | Czech2 | 10 | 5 | 2 | 7 | — | — | — | — | — | — |
| 1995–96 | HC Vitkovice | Czech | 39 | 14 | 5 | 19 | 28 | 4 | 3 | 1 | 4 | 8 |
| 1996–97 | HC Vitkovice | Czech | 51 | 16 | 16 | 32 | 44 | 9 | 5 | 3 | 8 | 14 |
| 1997–98 | HC Třinec | Czech | 47 | 19 | 14 | 33 | 79 | 13 | 6 | 0 | 6 | 12 |
| 1998–99 | HC Třinec | Czech | 32 | 14 | 7 | 21 | 39 | 10 | 1 | 2 | 3 | 0 |
| 1999–00 | HC Oceláři Třinec | Czech | 28 | 9 | 2 | 11 | 49 | — | — | — | — | — |
| 1999–00 | HC Karlovy Vary | Czech | 18 | 10 | 8 | 18 | 22 | — | — | — | — | — |
| 2000–01 | HC Karlovy Vary | Czech | 52 | 13 | 3 | 16 | 60 | — | — | — | — | — |
| 2001–02 | JYP Jyväskylä | SM-liiga | 56 | 34 | 10 | 44 | 88 | — | — | — | — | — |
| 2002–03 | JYP Jyväskylä | SM-liiga | 54 | 25 | 7 | 32 | 78 | 7 | 4 | 1 | 5 | 24 |
| 2003–04 | Metallurg Magnitogorsk | Russia | 18 | 2 | 6 | 8 | 14 | — | — | — | — | — |
| 2003–04 | Severstal Cherepovets | Russia | 34 | 10 | 7 | 17 | 46 | — | — | — | — | — |
| 2004–05 | Tappara | SM-liiga | 18 | 1 | 1 | 2 | 18 | — | — | — | — | — |
| 2005–06 | HC Znojemští Orli | Czech | 10 | 1 | 0 | 1 | 8 | — | — | — | — | — |
| 2005–06 | HC Slovan Bratislava | Slovak | 14 | 2 | 1 | 3 | 47 | — | — | — | — | — |
| 2005–06 | Vålerenga Ishockey | Norway | 10 | 8 | 7 | 15 | 8 | 15 | 10 | 2 | 12 | 54 |
| 2006–07 | Yunost Minsk | Belarus | 48 | 27 | 23 | 50 | 70 | 6 | 0 | 1 | 1 | 12 |
| 2007–08 | Yunost Minsk | Belarus | 8 | 0 | 0 | 0 | 8 | — | — | — | — | — |
| 2007–08 | HK Riga 2000 | Latvia | 9 | 8 | 4 | 12 | 18 | 7 | 5 | 2 | 7 | 8 |
| 2008–09 | Gazprom-OGU Orenburg | Russia2 | 2 | 1 | 0 | 1 | 2 | — | — | — | — | — |
| 2008–09 | Kapfenberger SV | Austria2 | 7 | 5 | 5 | 10 | 6 | 4 | 3 | 4 | 7 | 14 |
| 2009–10 | EC Wels | Austria3 | 21 | 36 | 24 | 60 | 16 | 7 | 6 | 5 | 11 | 12 |
| 2010–11 | EHC Wattens | Austria4 | 28 | 81 | 46 | 127 | 36 | 3 | 2 | 1 | 3 | 6 |
| 2011–12 | EHC Wattens | Austria4 | 28 | 59 | 27 | 86 | 40 | 3 | 4 | 4 | 8 | 2 |
| Czech totals | | | 318 | 107 | 62 | 169 | 341 | 36 | 15 | 6 | 21 | 34 |
| SM-liiga totals | | | 128 | 60 | 18 | 78 | 184 | 7 | 4 | 1 | 5 | 24 |
| Belarus totals | | | 56 | 27 | 23 | 50 | 78 | 6 | 0 | 1 | 1 | 12 |
