= Tomáš Voráček =

Czech ice hockey player (born 1990)

- Born: February 27, 1990 (age 36) Ostrava, Czechoslovakia
- Height: 6 ft 3 in (191 cm)
- Weight: 212 lb (96 kg; 15 st 2 lb)
- Position: Defence
- Shoots: Left
- ELH team Former teams: HC Sparta Praha; HC Vítkovice; HC Bílí Tygři Liberec; BK Mladá Boleslav; HC Slovan Bratislava
- NHL draft: Undrafted
- Playing career: 2007–present

Tomáš Voráček (born February 27, 1990) is a Czech professional ice hockey defenceman for HC Sparta Praha of the Czech Extraliga (ELH)

== Playing career ==
Voráček made his senior professional debut with youth club, HC Vítkovice in the Czech Extraliga during the 2006–07 Czech Extraliga season.

In the 2017–18 season, Voráček signed a one-year contract and made his debut in the Russian-based, Kontinental Hockey League with HC Slovan Bratislava. After recording just 3 assists in 53 games, Voráček returned to the Czech Extraliga, joining his fourth ELH club, HC Sparta Praha, on January 31, 2018.
