= Martin Sloboda =

Slovak ice hockey player

- Born: October 2, 1990 (age 34); Bratislava, Czechoslovakia
- Height: 6 ft 2 in (188 cm)
- Weight: 176 lb (80 kg; 12 st 8 lb)
- Position: Forward
- Shoots: Left
- Slovak Extraliga team Former teams: HK 36 Skalica; HC Slovan Bratislava
- Playing career: 2010–present

Martin Sloboda (born 2 October 1990) is a Slovak professional ice hockey forward currently playing for HK 36 Skalica in the Slovak Extraliga.
