= Miroslav Javín =

Slovak ice hockey player

- Born: 2 August 1968 (age 56); Karviná, Czechoslovakia
- Height: 6 ft 0 in (183 cm)
- Position: Defenceman
- Slovak Extraliga team: HC Slovan Bratislava
- Playing career: 1989–2016–present

Miroslav Javín (born 2 August 1968) is a Slovak former professional ice hockey player who played with HC Slovan Bratislava in the Slovak Extraliga.
