= Tomáš Šiffalovič =

Slovak ice hockey player

- Born: 23 June 1988 (age 36); Bratislava, Czechoslovakia
- Height: 6 ft 2 in (188 cm)
- Position: Forward
- Slovak Extraliga team: HC Slovan Bratislava
- Playing career: 2003–present

Tomáš Šiffalovič (born 23 June 1988) is a Slovak former professional ice hockey player.

He played with clubs including HC Slovan Bratislava in the Slovak Extraliga.
