= Robin Just =

Slovak ice hockey player

- Born: 13 November 1987 (age 37); Bratislava, Czechoslovakia
- Height: 5 ft 10 in (178 cm)
- Position: Left wing
- Slovak Extraliga team: HC Slovan Bratislava
- Playing career: 2003–present

Robin Just (born 13 November 1987) is a Slovak professional ice hockey left winger who played with HC Slovan Bratislava in the Slovak Extraliga, and for five clubs in Germany.
