= Juraj Halaj =

Slovak ice hockey player

- Born: 7 July 1969 (age 56) Czechoslovakia
- Position: Centre
- Slovak Extraliga team: HC Slovan Bratislava

Juraj Halaj (born 7 July 1969) is a Slovak professional ice hockey player who played with HC Slovan Bratislava in the Slovak Extraliga.
