= Mikko Turunen =

Finnish ice hockey player

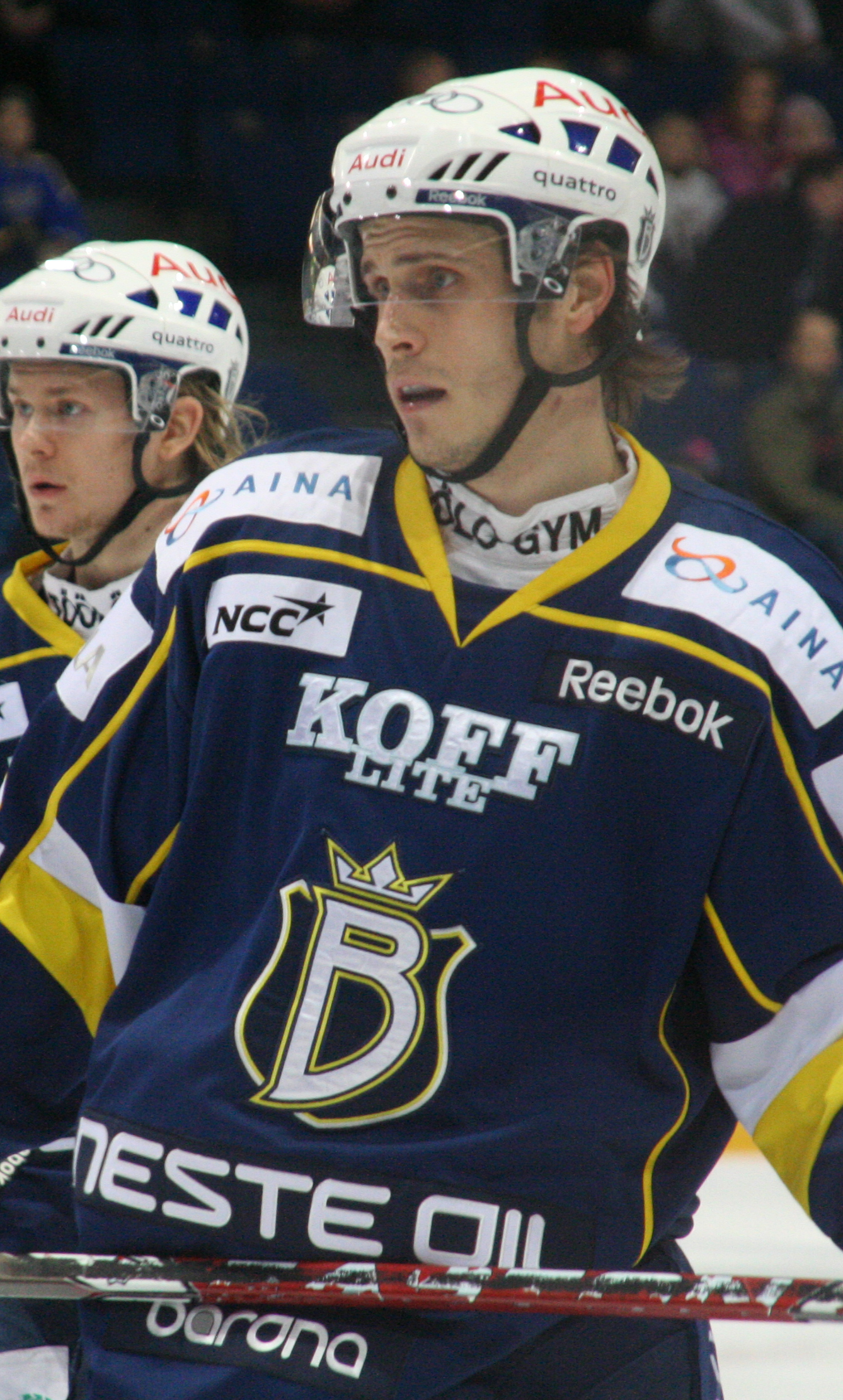
- Born: February 4, 1982 (age 43); Joensuu, Finland
- Height: 6 ft 2 in (188 cm)
- Weight: 196 lb (89 kg; 14 st 0 lb)
- Position: Defence
- Shot: Left
- Played for: HIFK; Espoo Blues
- NHL draft: Undrafted
- Playing career: 2000–2012

Mikko Turunen (born February 4, 1982) is a former professional ice hockey forward who played with HIFK in the SM-liiga.

== See also ==
- Ice hockey in Finland
