= Juraj Prokop =

Slovak ice hockey player

- Born: 18 September 1985 (age 40) Bratislava, Czechoslovakia
- Height: 5 ft 11 in (180 cm)
- Position: Right wing
- Slovak Extraliga team: HC Slovan Bratislava

Juraj Prokop (born 18 September 1985) is a Slovak professional ice hockey player who played with HC Slovan Bratislava in the Slovak Extraliga.
