= Marek Vorel =

Czech ice hockey player

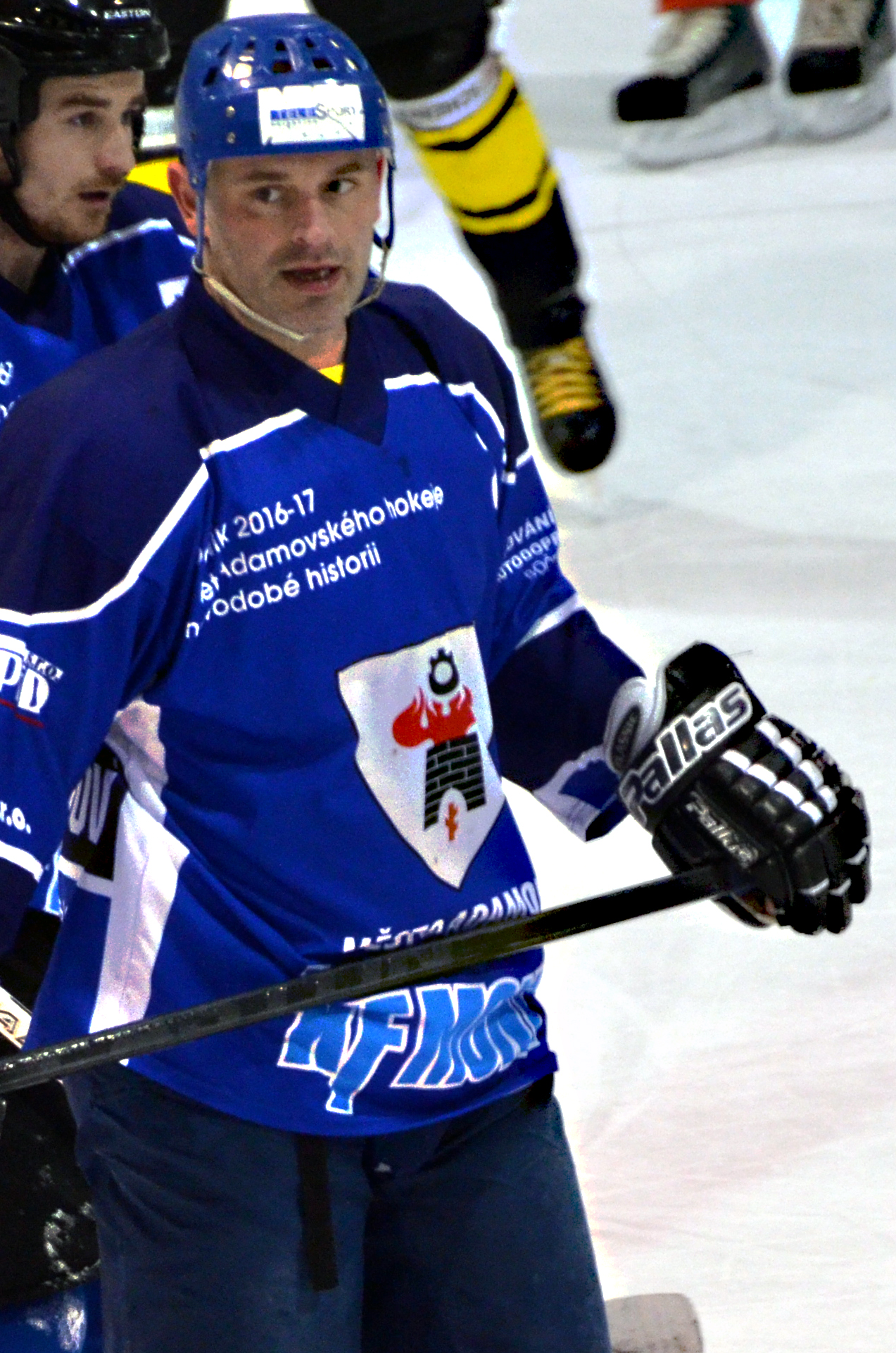
- Born: 27 August 1977 (age 47); Brno, Czechoslovakia
- Height: 6 ft 0 in (183 cm)
- Weight: 198 lb (90 kg; 14 st 2 lb)
- Position: Centre
- Shot: Right
- Played for: HC Kometa Brno; HC Kladno; HC Zlín; HC Znojemští Orli; Ilves; HC Plzeň; HC Pardubice; HC Slovan Bratislava; Traktor Chelyabinsk; HC Košice
- National team: Czech Republic
- Playing career: 1995–2015

Marek Vorel (27 August 1977 in Brno) is a former professional Czech ice hockey player. Vorel played the centre position.

Vorel played in the Czech Extraliga for HC Kometa Brno, HC Kladno, HC Zlín, HC Znojemští Orli, HC Plzeň and HC Pardubice. He also played in the SM-liiga for Ilves, the Slovak Extraliga for HC Slovan Bratislava and HC Košice and the Russian Superleague and Kontinental Hockey League for Traktor Chelyabinsk. Vorel played 399 games in the Czech Extraliga and scored 67 goals.
