= Pavol Mihalik =

Slovak ice hockey player

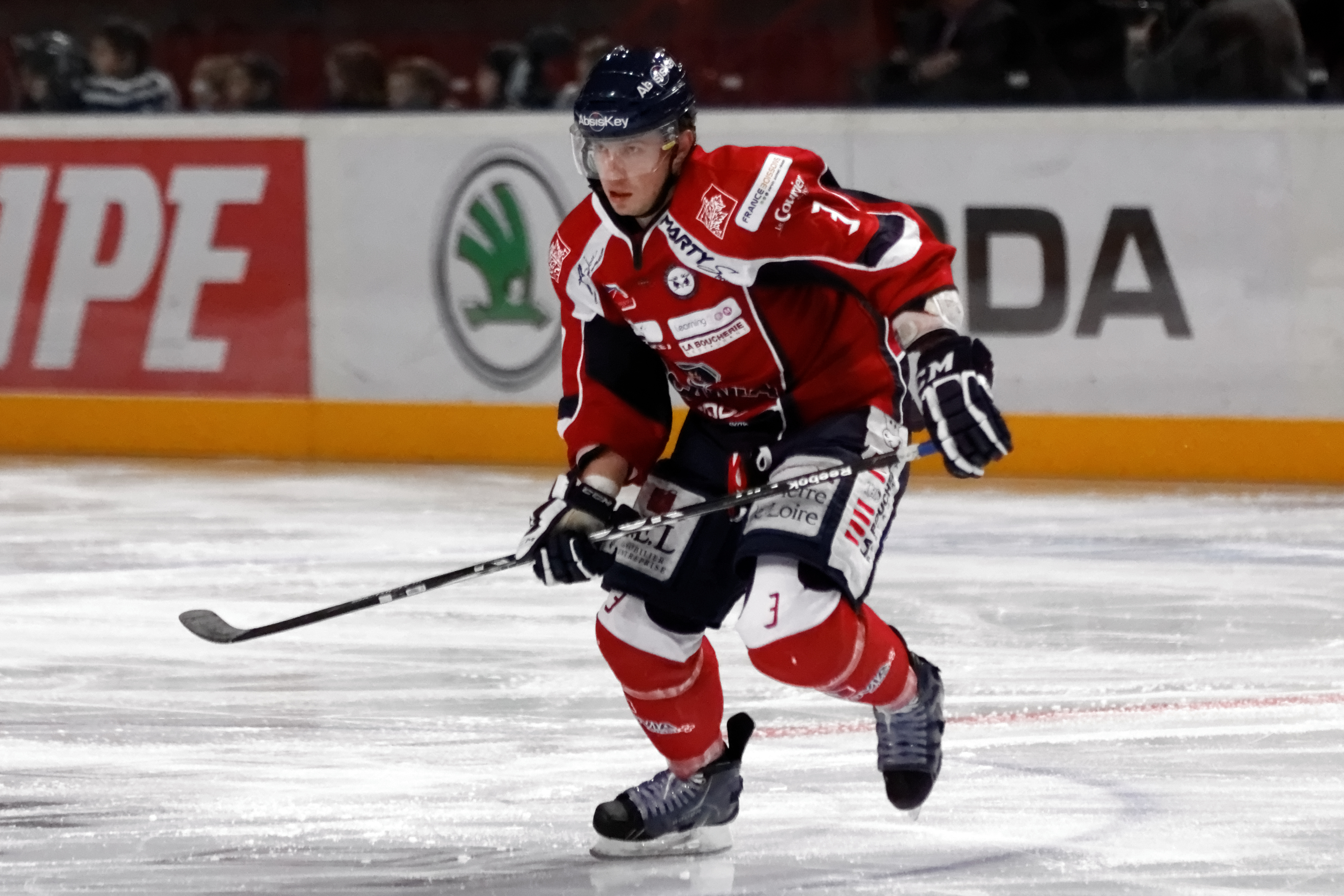
- Born: 18 November 1976 (age 48); Topoľčany, Czechoslovakia
- Height: 5 ft 10 in (178 cm)
- Position: Defenceman
- Slovak Extraliga team: HC Slovan Bratislava

Pavol Mihalik (born 18 November 1976) is a Slovak former professional ice hockey player who played with HC Slovan Bratislava in the Slovak Extraliga.
