= Martin Dulák =

Slovak ice hockey player

- Born: 21 September 1988 (age 36); Czechoslovakia
- Height: 6 ft 0 in (183 cm)
- Position: Defenceman
- Slovak Extraliga team: HC Slovan Bratislava
- Playing career: 2004–2014

Martin Dulák (born 21 September 1988) is a Slovak professional ice hockey player who played with HC Slovan Bratislava in the Slovak Extraliga.
