= Tomáš Němčický =

Czech ice hockey player

- Born: 27 March 1973 (age 53) Uherské Hradiště, Czechoslovakia
- Height: 6 ft 1 in (185 cm)
- Position: Left wing
- Slovak Extraliga team: HC Slovan Bratislava
- Playing career: 1990–present

Tomáš Němčický (born 27 March 1973) is a Czech former professional ice hockey player.

He played with clubs including HC Slovan Bratislava in the Slovak Extraliga.
