= Ondrej Prokop =

Slovak ice hockey player

- Born: 11 August 1981 (age 43); Czechoslovakia
- Height: 6 ft 0 in (183 cm)
- Position: Forward
- Slovak Extraliga team: HC Slovan Bratislava

Ondrej Prokop (born 11 August 1981) is a Slovak former professional ice hockey player who played with HC Slovan Bratislava in the Slovak Extraliga.
