= Daniel Neumann =

Slovak ice hockey player

- Born: April 26, 1989 (age 36); Bratislava, Czechoslovakia
- Height: 5 ft 9 in (175 cm)
- Weight: 176 lb (80 kg; 12 st 8 lb)
- Position: Defence
- Shoots: Left
- Played for: HC Slovan Bratislava; HDK Maribor
- NHL draft: Undrafted
- Playing career: 2008–present

Daniel Neumann (born April 26, 1989) is a Slovak professional ice hockey player. He has played for HC Slovan Bratislava in the Slovak Extraliga.
