= Boris Ertel =

Slovak ice hockey player

- Born: 18 November 1983 (age 41)
- Height: 6 ft 2 in (188 cm)
- Weight: 187 lb (85 kg; 13 st 5 lb)
- Position: Left wing
- Shot: Left
- Slovak Extraliga team: HC Slovan Bratislava
- Playing career: 2002–2011

Boris Ertel (born 18 November 1983) is a Slovak professional ice hockey player who played with HC Slovan Bratislava in the Slovak Extraliga.

== Career statistics ==
			Regular season					Playoffs
Season	Team	League	GP	G	A	Pts	PIM	GP	G	A	Pts	PIM
2002–03	HK Ruzinov 99 Bratislava	Slovak2	13	4	6	10	4	—	—	—	—	—
2003–04	HK 36 Skalica	Slovak	45	3	2	5	8	—	—	—	—	—
2004–05	HC Slovan Bratislava	Slovak	2	0	0	0	0	—	—	—	—	—
2004–05	HK Trnava	Slovak2	36	11	9	20	40	—	—	—	—	—
2005–06	HC Spartak Pelhřimov	Czech3	5	1	1	2	14	—	—	—	—	—
2005–06	TJ SC Kolín	Czech3	10	0	3	3	20	—	—	—	—	—
2006–07	Aarhus Crocodiles	Denmark2	21	12	14	26	148	—	—	—	—	—
2007–08	Aarhus Crocodiles	Denmark2	17	22	23	45	86	—	—	—	—	—
2010–11	AHK MI Ruzinov	Slovak3	21	13	19	32	52	—	—	—	—	—
Slovak totals			47	3	2	5	8	—	—	—	—	—
Slovak2 totals			49	15	15	30	44	—	—	—	—	—
