= Martin Karafiat =

Slovak ice hockey player

- Born: 21 October 1985 (age 39); Bratislava, Czechoslovakia
- Height: 6 ft 2 in (188 cm)
- Position: Defenceman
- Slovak Extraliga team: HC Slovan Bratislava
- Playing career: 2002–2011

Martin Karafiat (born 21 October 1985) is a Slovak former professional ice hockey player who played with HC Slovan Bratislava in the Slovak Extraliga.
