= Daniel Mracka =

Slovak ice hockey player

- Born: 12 January 1984 (age 41); Czechoslovakia
- Height: 5 ft 10 in (178 cm)
- Position: Forward
- Slovak Extraliga team: HC Slovan Bratislava

Daniel Mracka (born 12 January 1984) is a Slovak former professional ice hockey player who played with HC Slovan Bratislava in the Slovak Extraliga.
