= Peter Novajovský =

Slovak ice hockey player

- Born: 27 September 1989 (age 36) Bratislava, Czechoslovakia
- Height: 6 ft 0 in (183 cm)
- Weight: 187 lb (85 kg; 13 st 5 lb)
- Position: Defence
- Shoots: Left
- Slovak team Former teams: HC Nové Zámky; HC Slovan Bratislava; HK Ružinov 99 Bratislava; HK Orange 20; HC Šumperk; HC Vrchlabí; HC Přerov; HK Spišská Nová Ves; HC '05 Banská Bystrica; HKM Zvolen; HK Dukla Trenčín; KS Cracovia; GKS Tychy; HK Poprad; MHk 32 Liptovský Mikuláš
- Playing career: 2007–present

Peter Novajovský (born 27 September 1989) is a Slovak professional ice hockey player who currently playing for HC Nové Zámky of the Slovak Extraliga.

== Career ==
Novajovský made his senior debut for HC Slovan Bratislava during the 2007–08 Slovak Extraliga season. He also played for KS Cracovia and GKS Tychy of the Polska Hokej Liga.

== Career statistics ==
=== Regular season and playoffs ===
			Regular season					Playoffs
Season	Team	League	GP	G	A	Pts	PIM	GP	G	A	Pts	PIM
2006–07	HC Slovan Bratislava	Slovak-Jr.	47	2	5	7	46	3	0	2	2	4
2007–08	HC Slovan Bratislava	Slovak-Jr.	14	1	0	1	46	—	—	—	—	—
2007–08	HC Slovan Bratislava	Slovak	2	0	0	0	0	—	—	—	—	—
2007–08	HK Ružinov 99 Bratislava	Slovak.1	3	0	0	0	0	—	—	—	—	—
2007–08	HK Orange 20	Slovak	19	1	0	1	12	—	—	—	—	—
2008–09	HC Slovan Bratislava	Slovak-Jr.	44	9	12	21	100	—	—	—	—	—
2008–09	HC Slovan Bratislava	Slovak	10	0	1	1	27	—	—	—	—	—
2009–10	HC Šumperk	Czech.1	17	0	4	4	6	—	—	—	—	—
2009–10	HC Vrchlabí	Czech.1	13	0	2	2	4	1	0	0	0	0
2010–11	HC Přerov	Czech.2	25	1	2	3	42	5	0	0	0	0
2011–12	HK Spišská Nová Ves	Slovak.1	39	2	8	10	76	—	—	—	—	—
2011–12	HC '05 Banská Bystrica	Slovak	9	0	0	0	0	5	0	1	1	0
2012–13	HC '05 Banská Bystrica	Slovak	30	5	4	9	24	—	—	—	—	—
2012–13	HKM Zvolen	Slovak	11	0	0	0	8	12	0	0	0	8
2013–14	HK Dukla Trenčín	Slovak	48	7	10	17	65	—	—	—	—	—
2014–15	HK Dukla Trenčín	Slovak	42	2	3	5	28	5	0	0	0	14
2015–16	KS Cracovia	Polska	20	1	10	11	16	17	1	4	5	6
2016–17	KS Cracovia	Polska	31	6	15	21	6	13	0	4	4	12
2017–18	KS Cracovia	Polska	27	6	19	25	10	—	—	—	—	—
2018–19	GKS Tychy	Polska	32	7	21	28	16	4	0	0	0	0
2019–20	GKS Tychy	Polska	41	6	19	25	20	4	0	1	1	0
2020–21	GKS Tychy	Polska	21	2	11	13	43	9	1	2	3	14
2021–22	HK Poprad	Slovak	39	4	6	10	14	7	0	0	0	0
2022–23	MHk 32 Liptovský Mikuláš	Slovak	43	4	10	14	26	—	—	—	—	—
Slovak totals			253	23	34	57	204	29	0	1	1	22

=== International ===
Year	Team	Event	Result	GP	G	A	Pts	PIM
2007	Slovakia	WJC18	5th	6	0	0	0	2
Junior totals				6	0	0	0	2
