= Lukáš Lauko =

Slovak ice hockey player

- Born: February 17, 1987 (age 38); Bratislava, Czechoslovakia
- Height: 6 ft 0 in (183 cm)
- Weight: 187 lb (85 kg; 13 st 5 lb)
- Position: Defense
- Shoots: Left
- Slovak Extraliga team: HC Slovan Bratislava
- NHL draft: Undrafted
- Playing career: 2006–present

Lukas Lauko (born February 17, 1987) is a Slovak professional ice hockey player who played with HC Slovan Bratislava in the Slovak Extraliga.
