= Tomáš Méry =

Slovak ice hockey player

- Born: 26 August 1990 (age 35) Bratislava, Slovakia
- Height: 6 ft 0 in (183 cm)
- Weight: 183 lb (83 kg; 13 st 1 lb)
- Position: F
- Shoots: Right
- Oberliga team Former teams: Hannover Scorpions; HC Slovan Bratislava

Tomáš Méry (Bratislava, 26 August 1990) is a Slovak professional ice hockey player.

In 2012 he played in Poland. He previously played with clubs including HC Slovan Bratislava in the Slovak Extraliga.
