= Roman Veber =

- Born: February 3, 1969 (age 56); Bratislava, Czechoslovakia
- Height: 5 ft 11 in (180 cm)
- Weight: 194 lb (88 kg; 13 st 12 lb)
- Position: Defence
- Shot: Right
- Played for: HC 05 Banská Bystrica (Slovak Extraliga)
- National team: Slovakia
- NHL draft: Undrafted
- Playing career: 1987–2009

Roman Veber (born February 3, 1969) is a Slovak former professional ice hockey player. He last played in the European Elite Leagues with HC 05 Banská Bystrica of the Slovak Extraliga during the 2008–09 Slovak Extraliga season.

== Career statistics ==
			Regular season					Playoffs
Season	Team	League	GP	G	A	Pts	PIM	GP	G	A	Pts	PIM
1987–88	HC Slovan Bratislava	Czech	11	0	3	3	—	—	—	—	—	—
1988–88	HC Slovan Bratislava	Czech	32	3	2	5	22	—	—	—	—	—
1989–90	HK Dukla Trencin	Czech	16	1	0	1	—	—	—	—	—	—
1990–91	HC Slovan Bratislava	Czech	49	6	6	12	30	—	—	—	—	—
1991–92	HC Slovan Bratislava	Czech	36	5	2	7	0	3	0	1	1	0
1992–93	HC Slovan Bratislava	Czech	38	9	13	22	0	—	—	—	—	—
1993–94	KLH Vajgar Jindřichův Hradec	Czech	35	2	2	4	26	—	—	—	—	—
1994–95	HC Slovan Bratislava	Slovak	21	0	6	6	44	—	—	—	—	—
1995–96	HC Slovan Bratislava	Slovak	39	3	8	11	20	—	—	—	—	—
1996–97	HC Olomouc	Czech	48	4	7	11	20	—	—	—	—	—
1998–99	HK Dukla Trencin	Slovak	15	1	0	1	0	—	—	—	—	—
1998–99	Ritten Sport	Italy3	—	—	—	—	—	—	—	—	—	—
1998–99	EHC Wolfsburg	Germany3	34	6	16	22	48	—	—	—	—	—
1999–00	EHC Wolfsburg	Germany3	35	6	28	34	60	—	—	—	—	—
2000–01	EHC Wolfsburg	Germany3	36	12	27	39	77	—	—	—	—	—
2001–02	EHC Wolfsburg	Germany2	51	8	31	39	60	5	1	4	5	2
2002–03	EHC Wolfsburg	Germany2	47	8	22	30	38	3	0	1	1	12
2003–04	EHC Wolfsburg	Germany2	46	4	18	22	48	12	1	4	5	4
2004–05	Grizzly Adams Wolfsburg	DEL	45	2	13	15	48	5	0	0	0	0
2005–06	ETC Crimmitschau	Germany3	52	4	37	41	48	6	1	2	3	2
2006–07	ETC Crimmitschau	Germany2	48	7	13	20	92	—	—	—	—	—
2007–08	Ravensburg Towerstars	Germany2	49	3	16	19	52	—	—	—	—	—
2008–09	HC Banska Bystrica	Slovak	7	0	2	2	2	—	—	—	—	—
2008–09	HK Ružinov	Slovak2	4	0	3	3	2	4	0	2	2	2
Czech totals			265	30	35	65	98	13	1	3	4	4
Germany2 totals			241	30	100	130	290	31	3	14	17	26
Slovak totals			82	4	16	20	56	—	—	—	—	—
