= 1998–99 Czech 1. Liga season =

The 1998–99 Czech 1.liga season was the sixth season of the Czech 1.liga, the second level of ice hockey in the Czech Republic. 14 teams participated in the league, and HC Znojemsti Orli won the championship.

== Regular season ==
	Club	GP	W	T	L	Goals	Pts
1.	HC Znojemští Orli	52	37	6	9	245:117	80
2.	SK Horácká Slavia Třebíč	52	27	17	8	152:99	71
3.	HC Rosice	52	26	14	12	189:145	66
4.	HC Berounští Medvědi	52	26	11	15	203:137	63
5.	KLH Chomutov	52	27	8	17	195:161	62
6.	HC Olomouc	52	21	9	22	149:159	51
7.	HC Kralupy nad Vltavou	52	18	14	20	137:152	50
8.	TJ Slovan Jindřichův Hradec	52	17	14	21	165:176	48
9.	SK Kadaň	52	17	11	24	134:164	45
10.	IHC Písek	52	15	14	23	146:163	44
11.	HC Liberec	52	19	5	28	152:182	43
12.	HC Havířov	52	18	7	27	145:178	43
13.	HC Kometa Brno	52	13	11	28	136:208	37
14.	HC Rebel Havlíčkův Brod	52	8	9	35	119:226	25

== Relegation ==
	Club	GP	W	T	L	GF	GA	Pts
1.	HC Šumperk	6	4	1	1	28	20	9
2.	HC Kometa Brno	6	4	0	2	26	17	8
3.	HC Slovan Ústí nad Labem	6	2	1	3	14	21	5
4.	HC Rebel Havlíčkův Brod	6	0	2	4	13	23	2
