= 2007–08 Czech Extraliga season =

2007–08 Czech Extraliga
- League: Czech Extraliga
- Sport: Ice hockey
- Duration: September 2007 – April 2008
- Teams: 14
- TV partner: Česká televize

Regular season
- Presidential Cup: České Budějovice

Playoffs

Finals
- Champions: Slavia Praha
- Runners-up: Karlovy Vary

Czech Extraliga seasons
- ← 2006–07 2008–09 →

The 2007–08 Czech Extraliga season was the 15th season of the Czech Extraliga since its creation after the breakup of Czechoslovakia and the Czechoslovak First Ice Hockey League in 1993. Slavia Praha won their second league title after beating Karlovy Vary by 4 games to 3 in the finals.

== Standings ==
Place	Team	GP	W	OTW	OTL	L	Goals	Pts
1.	HC České Budějovice	52	30	5	6	11	166:111	106
2.	HC Slavia Praha	52	29	3	5	15	181:130	98
3.	Bílí Tygři Liberec	52	21	9	10	12	146:120	91
4.	HC Energie Karlovy Vary	52	18	12	7	15	162:141	85
5.	HC Litvínov	52	20	6	8	18	145:141	80
6.	HC Sparta Praha	52	19	6	10	17	135:145	79
7.	HC Oceláři Třinec	52	21	5	5	21	144:144	78
8.	HC Geus Okna Kladno	52	18	9	5	20	149:144	77
9.	HC Lasselsberger Plzeň	52	14	14	7	17	174:172	77
10.	HC Znojemští Orli	52	19	6	7	20	133:139	76
11.	HC Vítkovice Steel	52	19	4	7	22	131:149	72
12.	HC Moeller Pardubice	52	18	6	4	24	147:157	70
13.	RI Okna Zlín	52	19	1	4	28	135:166	63
14.	HC Slovan Ústečtí Lvi	52	6	7	8	31	107:196	40

== Playoffs ==
=== Pre-Playoffs ===
- HC Ocleari Trinec - HC Znojemsti Orli 3-0 on series
- HC Geus Okna Kladno - HC Plzen 3-2 on series

=== Quarterfinals ===
- HC Ceske Budejovice - HC Geus Okna Kladno 4-1 on series
- HC Energie Karlovy Vary - HC Litvinov 4-1 on series
- HC Slavia Praha - HC Ocleari Trinec 4-1 on series
- Bili Tygri Liberec - HC Sparta Praha 4-0 on series

=== Semifinals ===
- HC Energie Karlovy Vary - HC Ceske Budejovice 4-3 on series
- HC Slavia Praha - Bili Tygri Liberec 4-3 on series

=== Final ===
- HC Slavia Praha - HC Energie Karlovy Vary 4-3 on series

== Playouts ==
Place	Team	GP	W	OTW	OTL	L	Goals	Pts
11.	HC Vítkovice Steel	64	28	4	7	25	177:185	99
12.	HC Moeller Pardubice	64	22	6	5	31	178:197	83
13.	RI Okna Zlín	64	23	1	5	35	169:209	76
14.	HC Slovan Ústečtí Lvi	64	11	9	8	36	144:225	59

=== Relegation ===
- BK Mlada Boleslav - HC Slovan Ustecti Lvi 0-4, 3-0, 4-0, 4-3, 7-1
