= 2005–06 Czech Extraliga season =

2005–06 Czech Extraliga
- League: Czech Extraliga
- Sport: Ice hockey
- Duration: September 2005 – April 2006
- TV partner: Česká televize

Regular season
- Presidential Cup: Bílí Tygři Liberec

Playoffs

Finals
- Champions: Sparta Praha
- Runners-up: Slavia Praha

Czech Extraliga seasons
- ← 2004–05 2006–07 →

The 2005–06 Czech Extraliga season was the 13th season of the Czech Extraliga since its creation after the breakup of Czechoslovakia and the Czechoslovak First Ice Hockey League in 1993. Sparta Praha beat Slavia Praha by 4 games to 2 in the finals to win the championship.

== Regular season ==
=== Standings ===
Place	Team	GP	W	OTW	T	OTL	L	Goals	Pts
1.	HC Bílí Tygři Liberec	52	32	1	5	3	11	152:94	106
2.	HC Slavia Praha	52	31	0	7	1	13	164:111	101
3.	HC Hamé Zlín	52	25	3	6	2	16	122:103	89
4.	HC Vítkovice Steel	52	24	2	8	0	18	152:128	84
5.	HC Znojemští Orli	52	23	1	10	3	15	117:110	84
6.	HC Sparta Praha	52	21	5	2	3	21	155:135	78
7.	HC Oceláři Třinec	52	23	1	5	1	22	135:142	77
8.	HC České Budějovice	52	19	3	12	1	17	115:118	76
9.	HC Moeller Pardubice	52	21	1	5	2	23	130:134	72
10.	HC Energie Karlovy Vary	52	19	2	9	1	21	120:128	71
11.	HC Lasselsberger Plzeň	52	17	1	8	2	24	130:136	63
12.	HC Litvínov	52	14	4	5	4	25	113:140	59
13.	HC Rabat Kladno	52	12	5	3	4	28	114:168	53
14.	Vsetínská hokejová	52	6	1	9	3	33	80:152	32

Key

(C) = Playoff champions; (Q) = Qualified to playoffs; (RP) = Relegation playoff; (O) = Relegation playoff winner; (R) = Relegated.

== Playoffs ==
=== Bracket ===
Quarterfinals

- HC Slavia Praha beats HC Ocelari Trinec 4 games to 0
- HC Ceske Budejovice beats HC Bili Tygri Liberec 4 games to 1
- HC Sparta Praha beats HC Hame Zlin 4 games to 2
- HC Znojemsti Orli beats HC Vitkovice Steel 4 games to 2

Semifinals

- HC Slavia Praha beats HC Ceske Budejovice 4 games to 1
- HC Sparta Praha beats HC Znojemsti Orli 4 games to 1

Final

- HC Sparta Praha beats HC Slavia Praha 4 games to 2

== Relegation ==
=== Play-out round ===
- Vsetinska hokejova - HC Slovan Ustecti Lvi 0-2, 4-1, 1-3, 3-2, 2-1, 1-0

HC Vsetin is relegated
