= 2006–07 Czech Extraliga season =

2006–07 Czech Extraliga
- League: Czech Extraliga
- Sport: Ice hockey
- Duration: September 2006 – April 2007
- TV partner: Česká televize

Regular season
- Presidential Cup: HC Bílí Tygři Liberec

Playoffs

Finals
- Champions: Sparta Praha
- Runners-up: Pardubice

Czech Extraliga seasons
- ← 2005–06 2007–08 →

The 2006–07 Czech Extraliga season was the 14th season of the Czech Extraliga since its creation after the breakup of Czechoslovakia and the Czechoslovak First Ice Hockey League in 1993. Sparta Praha beat Pardubice for the championship by 4 games to 2 in the finals.

== Standings ==
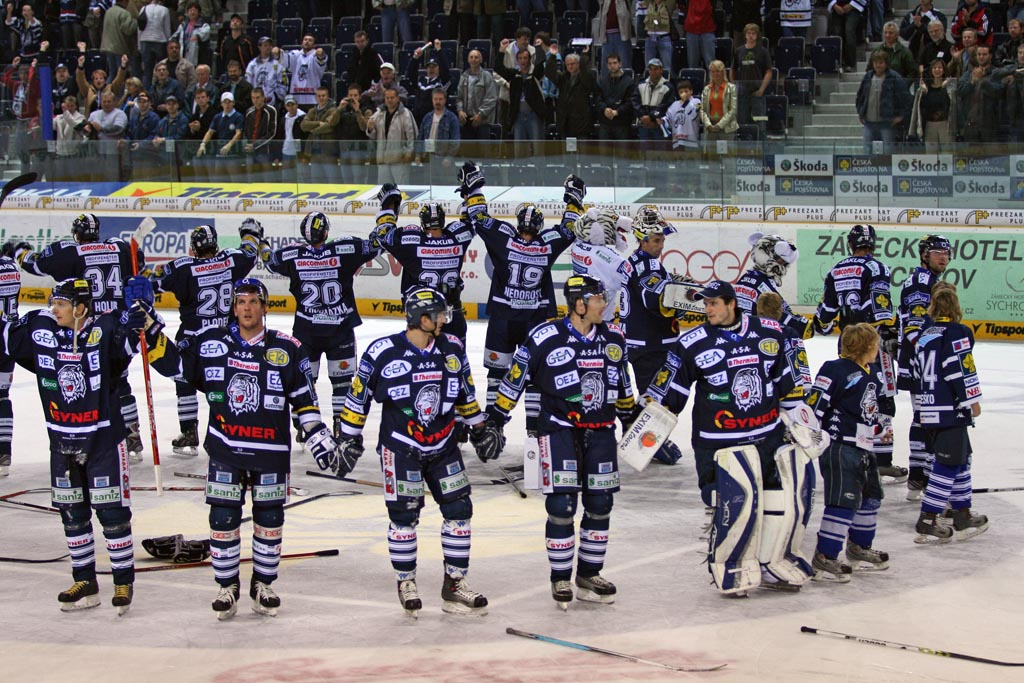
HC Liberec Players

Place	Team	GP	W	OTW	OTL	L	Goals	Pts
1.	HC Bílí Tygři Liberec	52	28	6	4	14	161:112	100
2.	HC Moeller Pardubice	52	29	1	3	19	177:131	92
3.	HC České Budějovice	52	23	9	2	18	160:144	89
4.	HC Sparta Praha	52	25	2	8	17	178:157	87
5.	HC Hamé Zlín	52	21	8	7	16	162:158	86
6.	HC Slavia Praha	52	21	6	6	19	171:162	81
7.	HC Energie Karlovy Vary	52	20	7	6	19	136:124	80
8.	HC Rabat Kladno	52	21	6	4	21	189:173	79
9.	HC Znojemští Orli	52	20	7	2	23	117:129	76
10.	HC Oceláři Třinec	52	20	4	8	20	145:162	76
11.	HC Vítkovice Steel	52	22	2	5	23	141:141	75
12.	HC Litvínov	52	20	4	6	22	157:165	74
13.	HC Lasselsberger Plzeň	52	20	1	1	30	141:173	63
14.	Vsetínská hokejová	52	8	3	4	37	88:192	34

== Playoffs ==
=== Pre-Playoffs ===
HC Energie Karlovy Vary (7) - (10) HC Oceláři Třinec 0:3

HC Rabat Kladno (8) - (9) HC Znojemští Orli 0:3

=== Quarterfinals ===
- HC Sparta Praha - HC Hame Zlin 4:1
- Bili Tygri Liberec - HC Ocleari Trinec 4:3
- HC Moeller Pardubice - HC Znojemsti Orli 4:3
- HC Ceske Budejovice - HC Slavia Praha 4:2

=== Semifinals ===
- HC Sparta Praha - Bili Tygri Liberec 4:1
- HC Moeller Pardubice - HC Ceske Budejovice 4-1

=== Final ===
- HC Sparta Praha - HC Moeller Pardubice 4:2

== Relegation ==
No promotion/relegation between the Czech Extraliga and Czech 1. Liga existed this year.
