= 2004–05 Czech Extraliga season =

2004–05 Czech Extraliga
- League: Czech Extraliga
- Sport: Ice hockey
- Duration: September 2004 – April 2005
- TV partner(s): Česká televize

Regular season
- Presidential Cup: Zlín

Playoffs

Finals
- Champions: Pardubice
- Runners-up: Zlín

Czech Extraliga seasons
- ← 2003–04 2005–06 →

The 2004–05 Czech Extraliga season was the 12th season of the Czech Extraliga since its creation after the breakup of Czechoslovakia and the Czechoslovak First Ice Hockey League in 1993. HC Moeller Pardubice won the championship, beating HC Hamé Zlín by 4 games to 0 in the finals.

== Regular season ==
=== Standings ===
Place	Team	GP	W	OTW	T	L	OTL	Goals	Pts
1.	HC Hamé Zlín	52	31	2	4	12	3	145:102	104
2.	HC Sparta Praha	52	29	4	5	12	2	164:106	102
3.	HC Moeller Pardubice	52	29	2	2	15	4	185:130	97
4.	HC Slavia Praha	52	29	3	1	16	3	164:127	97
5.	HC Bílí Tygři Liberec	52	25	7	3	16	1	149:121	93
6.	HC Rabat Kladno	52	26	1	4	21	0	146:136	84
7.	HC Vítkovice Steel	52	22	3	6	19	2	136:126	80
8.	HC Chemopetrol Litvínov	52	22	1	4	23	2	146:140	74
9.	HC Lasselsberger Plzeň	52	21	1	5	21	4	134:139	74
10.	HC Energie Karlovy Vary	52	20	2	5	25	0	134:136	69
11.	HC Znojemští Orli	52	18	2	3	24	5	137:163	66
12.	Vsetínská hokejová	52	15	2	4	30	1	118:166	54
13.	HC Oceláři Třinec	52	10	3	5	29	5	102:163	46
14.	HC Dukla Jihlava	52	6	0	5	40	1	90:195	24

== Playoffs ==
Quarterfinals

- HC Moeller Pardubice beats HC Rabat Kladno 4 games to 3
- HC Bílí Tygři Liberec beats HC Slavia Praha 4 games to 3
- HC Hamé Zlín beats HC Litvinov 4 games to 2
- HC Vítkovice Steel beats HC Sparta Praha 4 games to 1

Semifinals

- HC Moeller Pardubice beats HC Bílí Tygři Liberec 4 games to 1
- HC Hamé Zlín beats HC Vítkovice Steel 4 games to 3

Final

- HC Moeller Pardubice beats HC Hamé Zlín 4 games to 0

== Relegation ==
=== Play-out round ===
- HC Ceske Budejovice - HC Dukla Jihlava 1–5, 5–0, 3–2, 4–0, 4–2

Dukla Jihlava is relegated
