= 2003–04 Czech Extraliga season =

2003–04 Czech Extraliga
- League: Czech Extraliga
- Sport: Ice hockey
- Duration: September 2003 – April 2004
- TV partner(s): Česká televize

Regular season
- Presidential Cup: Pardubice

Playoffs

Finals
- Champions: Hamé Zlín (1st title)
- Runners-up: Slavia Praha

Czech Extraliga seasons
- ← 2002–03 2004–05 →

The 2003–04 Czech Extraliga season was the 11th season of the Czech Extraliga since its creation after the breakup of Czechoslovakia and the Czechoslovak First Ice Hockey League in 1993. HC Hamé Zlín won their first championship, defeating defending champions HC Slavia Praha in five games in the finals.

== Standings ==
Place	Team	GP	W	OTW	T	L	OTL	Goals	Pts
1.	HC Moeller Pardubice	52	32	0	7	8	5	176:107	108
2.	HC Hamé Zlín	52	27	3	3	16	3	153:119	93
3.	HC Sparta Praha	52	27	1	5	17	2	150:116	90
4.	HC Znojemští Orli	52	23	5	5	17	2	148:138	86
5.	HC Slavia Praha	52	23	4	5	17	3	152:127	85
6.	HC Vítkovice Steel	52	22	3	7	17	3	154:134	82
7.	HC Oceláři Třinec	52	23	1	3	24	1	152:157	75
8.	HC Lasselsberger Plzeň	52	18	3	7	23	1	138:140	68
9.	HC Rabat Kladno	52	18	4	3	24	3	111:151	68
10.	HC Chemopetrol Litvínov	52	16	2	10	22	2	129:154	64
11.	Bílí Tygři Liberec	52	15	2	9	21	5	123:146	63
12.	HC Energie Karlovy Vary	52	16	2	8	24	2	114:143	62
13.	Vsetínská hokejová	52	15	4	6	26	1	113:126	60
14.	HC České Budějovice	52	13	1	4	32	2	105:160	47

== Playoffs ==
=== Quarterfinal ===
- HC Moeller Pardubice - HC Lasselsberger Plzeň 6:3 (1:2,2:0,3:1)
- HC Moeller Pardubice - HC Lasselsberger Plzeň 5:2 (1:0,2:2,2:0)
- HC Lasselsberger Plzeň - HC Moeller Pardubice 4:2 (2:1,1:1,1:0)
- HC Lasselsberger Plzeň - HC Moeller Pardubice 6:3 (1:1,2:2,3:0)
- HC Moeller Pardubice - HC Lasselsberger Plzeň 5:2 (1:0,3:1,1:1)
- HC Lasselsberger Plzeň - HC Moeller Pardubice 3:1 (0:0,1:1,2:0)
- HC Moeller Pardubice - HC Lasselsberger Plzeň 1:5 (0:2,1:2,0:1)
- HC Hamé Zlín - HC Oceláři Třinec 4:1 (3:0,0:0,1:1)
- HC Hamé Zlín - HC Oceláři Třinec 1:3 (1:2,0:1,0:0)
- HC Oceláři Třinec - HC Hamé Zlín 1:0 (0:0,1:0,0:0)
- HC Oceláři Třinec - HC Hamé Zlín 2:3 SN (1:0,1:1,0:1,0:0)
- HC Hamé Zlín - HC Oceláři Třinec 8:3 (2:0,1:2,5:1)
- HC Oceláři Třinec - HC Hamé Zlín 1:0 SN (0:0,0:0,0:0,0:0)
- HC Hamé Zlín - HC Oceláři Třinec 2:0 (0:0,1:0,1:0)
- HC Excalibur Znojemští Orli - HC Slavia Praha 4:3 (0:0,1:1,3:2)
- HC Excalibur Znojemští Orli - HC Slavia Praha 1:4 (0:1,1:0,0:3)
- HC Slavia Praha - HC Excalibur Znojemští Orli 2:3 PP (1:0,1:2,0:0,0:1)
- HC Slavia Praha - HC Excalibur Znojemští Orli 3:0 (1:0,1:0,1:0)
- HC Excalibur Znojemští Orli - HC Slavia Praha 5:2 (1:1,1:0,3:1)
- HC Slavia Praha - HC Excalibur Znojemští Orli 5:0 (2:0,2:0,1:0)
- HC Excalibur Znojemští Orli - HC Slavia Praha 2:3 SN (2:1,0:1,0:0,0:0)
- HC Sparta Praha - HC Vítkovice 3:2 PP (0:0,1:1,1:1,1:0)
- HC Sparta Praha - HC Vítkovice 3:0 (0:0,2:0,1:0)
- HC Vítkovice - HC Sparta Praha 5:0 (1:0,3:0,1:0)
- HC Vítkovice - HC Sparta Praha 6:2 (1:0,3:0,2:2)
- HC Sparta Praha - HC Vítkovice 6:1 (1:0,0:0,5:1)
- HC Vítkovice - HC Sparta Praha 1:4 (1:1,0:1,0:2)

=== Semifinal ===
- HC Hamé Zlín - HC Lasselsberger Plzeň 7:2 (2:1,3:1,2:0)
- HC Hamé Zlín - HC Lasselsberger Plzeň 4:3 PP (2:1,0:1,1:1,1:0)
- HC Lasselsberger Plzeň - HC Hamé Zlín 3:2 (1:1,2:1,0:0)
- HC Lasselsberger Plzeň - HC Hamé Zlín 0:3 (0:1,0:0,0:2)
- HC Hamé Zlín - HC Lasselsberger Plzeň 4:2 (1:0,1:1,2:1)
- HC Sparta Praha - HC Slavia Praha 1:4 (1:1,0:0,0:3)
- HC Sparta Praha - HC Slavia Praha 2:1 PP (0:1,0:0,1:0,1:0)
- HC Slavia Praha - HC Sparta Praha 1:2 SN (0:1,1:0,0:0,0:0)
- HC Slavia Praha - HC Sparta Praha 3:4 SN (3:1,0:0,0:2,0:0)
- HC Sparta Praha - HC Slavia Praha 3:4 PP (0:1,1:0,2:2,0:1)
- HC Slavia Praha - HC Sparta Praha 4:2 (0:0,1:2,3:0)
- HC Sparta Praha - HC Slavia Praha 0:3 (0:1,0:0,0:2)

=== Final ===
- HC Hamé Zlín - HC Slavia Praha 2–3, 3–2, 2–1, 1–0, 4-1

HC Hamé Zlín wins the Czech Extraliga.

== Relegation ==
- HC České Budějovice - HC Dukla Jihlava 2:3 PP (0:0,2:1,0:1,0:1)
- HC České Budějovice - HC Dukla Jihlava 0:1 (0:0,0:0,0:1)
- HC Dukla Jihlava - HC České Budějovice 3:2 SN (1:1,1:0,0:1,0:0)
- HC Dukla Jihlava - HC České Budějovice 3:0 (0:0,1:0,2:0)
