= 2002–03 Czech Extraliga season =

2002–03 Czech Extraliga
- League: Czech Extraliga
- Sport: Ice hockey
- Duration: September 2002 – April 2003
- TV partner: Česká televize

Regular season
- Presidential Cup: HC ČSOB Pojišťovna Pardubice

Playoffs

Finals
- Champions: HC Slavia Praha
- Runners-up: HC ČSOB Pojišťovna Pardubice

Czech Extraliga seasons
- ← 2001–02 2003–04 →

The 2002–03 Czech Extraliga season was the 10th season of the Czech Extraliga since its creation after the breakup of Czechoslovakia and the Czechoslovak First Ice Hockey League in 1993. HC Slavia Praha beat HC ČSOB Pojišťovna Pardubice in the finals, with a seventh game being played to decide the title for the first time.

== Standings ==
| Place | Team | GP | W | OTW | T | L | OTL | Goals | Pts |
|---|---|---|---|---|---|---|---|---|---|
| 1. | HC IPB Pojišťovna Pardubice | 52 | 33 | 4 | 2 | 1 | 2 | 170:112 | 111 |
| 2. | HC Slavia Praha | 52 | 26 | 6 | 7 | 11 | 2 | 150:93 | 96 |
| 3. | HC Sparta Praha | 52 | 25 | 3 | 9 | 13 | 3 | 147:117 | 93 |
| 4. | HC Oceláři Třinec | 52 | 24 | 3 | 4 | 19 | 2 | 187:147 | 84 |
| 5. | HC Vítkovice | 52 | 21 | 3 | 8 | 15 | 5 | 154:127 | 82 |
| 6. | HC České Budějovice | 52 | 21 | 5 | 4 | 19 | 3 | 149:140 | 80 |
| 7. | HC Vsetín | 52 | 23 | 2 | 5 | 22 | 0 | 165:153 | 78 |
| 8. | HC Excalibur Znojemští Orli | 52 | 21 | 3 | 5 | 20 | 3 | 154:139 | 77 |
| 9. | HC Keramika Plzeň | 52 | 21 | 2 | 4 | 22 | 3 | 137:150 | 71 |
| 10. | HC Becherovka Karlovy Vary | 52 | 19 | 4 | 2 | 23 | 4 | 133:149 | 71 |
| 11. | HC Chemopetrol Litvínov | 52 | 19 | 1 | 6 | 20 | 6 | 126:135 | 71 |
| 12. | Bílí Tygři Liberec | 52 | 17 | 3 | 3 | 26 | 3 | 136:162 | 63 |
| 13. | HC Hamé Zlín | 52 | 15 | 1 | 4 | 27 | 5 | 134:160 | 56 |
| 14. | HC Havířov | 52 | 4 | 2 | 3 | 42 | 1 | 81:239 | 20 |

== Playoffs ==
=== Quarterfinal ===
- HC ČSOB Pojišťovna Pardubice - HC Excalibur Znojemští Orli 2:1 (1:0,0:1,1:0)
- HC ČSOB Pojišťovna Pardubice - HC Excalibur Znojemští Orli 7:1 (4:0,1:0,2:1)
- HC Excalibur Znojemští Orli - HC ČSOB Pojišťovna Pardubice 3:2 (1:0,1:2,1:0)
- HC Excalibur Znojemští Orli - HC ČSOB Pojišťovna Pardubice 4:1 (1:0,2:0,1:1)
- HC ČSOB Pojišťovna Pardubice - HC Excalibur Znojemští Orli 3:1 (1:1,0:0,2:0)
- HC Excalibur Znojemští Orli - HC ČSOB Pojišťovna Pardubice 1:2 (0:1,1:1,0:0)
- HC Oceláři Třinec - HC Vítkovice 3:2 (0:0,1:0,2:2)
- HC Oceláři Třinec - HC Vítkovice 1:2 (0:1,1:1,0:0)
- HC Vítkovice - HC Oceláři Třinec 1:0 SN (0:0,0:0,0:0,0:0)
- HC Vítkovice - HC Oceláři Třinec 0:7 (0:2,0:3,0:2)
- HC Oceláři Třinec - HC Vítkovice 1:0 (0:0,0:0,1:0)
- HC Vítkovice - HC Oceláři Třinec 2:6 (1:3,1:1,0:2)
- HC Slavia Praha - HC Vsetín 2:0 (1:0,1:0,0:0)
- HC Slavia Praha - HC Vsetín 5:1 (2:0,3:1,0:0)
- HC Vsetín - HC Slavia Praha 1:2 SN (0:0,1:1,0:0,0:0)
- HC Vsetín - HC Slavia Praha 0:6 (0:0,0:3,0:3)
- HC Sparta Praha - HC České Budějovice 3:1 (3:0,0:1,0:0)
- HC Sparta Praha - HC České Budějovice 4:0 (2:0,1:0,1:0)
- HC České Budějovice - HC Sparta Praha 1:2 (0:1,1:0,0:1)
- HC České Budějovice - HC Sparta Praha 0:5 (0:0,0:4,0:1)

=== Semifinal ===
- HC ČSOB Pojišťovna Pardubice - HC Oceláři Třinec 10:2 (2:0,4:1,4:1)
- HC ČSOB Pojišťovna Pardubice - HC Oceláři Třinec 3:4 (1:1,1:3,1:0)
- HC Oceláři Třinec - HC ČSOB Pojišťovna Pardubice 1:4 (0:0,1:3,0:1)
- HC Oceláři Třinec - HC ČSOB Pojišťovna Pardubice 4:2 (1:1,2:1,1:0)
- HC ČSOB Pojišťovna Pardubice - HC Oceláři Třinec 7:2 (1:1,2:0,4:1)
- HC Oceláři Třinec - HC IPB Pojišťovna Pardubice 4:5 PP (1:1,2:2,1:1,0:1)
- HC Slavia Praha - HC Sparta Praha 0:2 (0:0,0:0,0:2)
- HC Slavia Praha - HC Sparta Praha 2:0 (0:0,0:0,2:0)
- HC Sparta Praha - HC Slavia Praha 2:3 SN (0:1,1:0,1:1,0:0)
- HC Sparta Praha - HC Slavia Praha 3:4 SN (1:0,0:1,2:2,0:0)
- HC Slavia Praha - HC Sparta Praha 1:2 (0:0,1:2,0:0)
- HC Sparta Praha - HC Slavia Praha 2:5 (1:3,1:1,0:1)

=== Final ===
- HC Slavia Praha - HC ČSOB Pojišťovna Pardubice 0–1, 4–2, 5–4, 2–0, 3–4, 1–5, 1-0

HC Slavia Praha is Czech champion for 2002–03.

== Relegation ==
- HC Havířov - HC Vagnerplast Kladno 5:4 PP (0:3,3:1,1:0,1:0)
- HC Havířov - HC Vagnerplast Kladno 2:3 (1:1,1:0,0:2)
- HC Vagnerplast Kladno - HC Havířov 5:3 (2:2,0:1,3:0)
- HC Vagnerplast Kladno - HC Havířov 9:1 (3:0,1:0,5:1)
- HC Havířov - HC Vagnerplast Kladno 3:1 (1:0,1:0,1:1)
- HC Vagnerplast Kladno - HC Havířov 2:0 (0:0,1:0,1:0)
