= 2024 IIHF World Championship Group B =

International ice hockey results

Group B was one of two groups of the 2024 IIHF World Championship. The four best-placed teams advanced to the playoff round, while the last placed team was relegated to Division I in 2025.

== Standings ==
Pos	Team	Pld	W	OTW	OTL	L	GF	GA	GD	Pts	Qualification or relegation
1	Sweden	7	7	0	0	0	35	9	+26	21	Quarterfinals
2	United States	7	5	0	1	1	37	16	+21	16	Quarterfinals
3	Germany	7	5	0	0	2	34	24	+10	15	Quarterfinals
4	Slovakia	7	3	1	1	2	26	23	+3	12	Quarterfinals
5	Latvia	7	1	3	0	3	19	29	−10	9	Qualification for 2025 IIHF World Championship
6	Kazakhstan	7	2	0	0	5	12	31	−19	6	Qualification for 2025 IIHF World Championship
7	France	7	1	0	1	5	13	26	−13	4	Qualification for 2025 IIHF World Championship
8	Poland	7	0	0	1	6	11	29	−18	1	Relegation to 2025 Division I A

Source: IIHF
Rules for classification: 1) points; 2) head-to-head points; 3) head-to-head goal difference; 4) head-to-head number of goals scored; 5) result against closest best-ranked team outside tied teams; 6) result against second-best-ranked team outside tied teams; 7) seeding before tournament

== Matches ==
All times are local (UTC+2).

=== Slovakia vs Germany ===
10 May 2024; 16:20	Slovakia	4–6 (0–0, 2–3, 2–3)	Germany	Ostravar Aréna, Ostrava; Attendance: 9,109

Game reference

Stanislav Škorvánek
Goalies
Philipp Grubauer
Referees:
(Finland) Lassi Heikkinen
(Canada) Mark Pearce
Linesmen:
(United States) Kevin Briganti
(Latvia) Dāvis Zunde

	0–1	29:46 – Kahun (Ehliz, Pföderl) (PP2)
	0–2	32:31 – J. Müller (Michaelis, Tuomie) (PP)
Hrivík (Cehlárik, Slafkovský) – 36:06	1–2
Fehérváry (Pospíšil) – 38:09	2–2
	2–3	39:31 – Kälble
	2–4	44:27 – Michaelis (Pföderl, Ehliz)
Hudáček (Slafkovský, Hrivík) – 54:13	3–4
	3–5	56:02 – Pföderl (Ehliz, J. Müller)
	3–6	58:55 – Eder (EN)
Sukeľ (Kelemen, Regenda) – 59:45	4–6

14 min
Penalties
8 min
39
Shots
22

=== Sweden vs United States ===
10 May 2024; 20:20	Sweden	5–2 (1–0, 2–1, 2–1)	United States	Ostravar Aréna, Ostrava; Attendance: 9,109

Game reference

Filip Gustavsson
Goalies
Alex Lyon
Referees:
(Czech Republic) Martin Fraňo
(Czech Republic) Jan Hribik
Linesmen:
(Czech Republic) Jiří Ondráček
(Czech Republic) Josef Špůr

Eriksson Ek (Heed, M. Johansson) (EA) – 08:20	1–0
Raymond (Hedman, Eriksson Ek) – 23:45	2–0
	2–1	32:32 – Werenski (Jones, Boldy)
M. Johansson (Holmberg, Pettersson) – 36:39	3–1
	3–2	43:43 – Nelson (Gaudreau, Vlasic)
Hedman (Holmberg, Kempe) (SH) (EN) – 59:01	4–2
Eriksson Ek (Frödén) (EN) – 59:54	5–2

6 min
Penalties
0 min
38
Shots
30

=== France vs Kazakhstan ===
11 May 2024; 12:20	France	1–3 (1–2, 0–1, 0–0)	Kazakhstan	Ostravar Aréna, Ostrava; Attendance: 9,109

Game reference

Sebastian Ylönen
Goalies
Andrei Shutov
Referees:
(Canada) Michael Campbell
(Switzerland) Michael Tscherrig
Linesmen:
(Czech Republic) Josef Špůr
(Latvia) Dāvis Zunde

Cantagallo (Boudon, Rech) – 02:00	1–0
	1–1	03:06 – Starchenko (Rymarev)
	1–2	07:30 – Mukhametov (Orekhov, Savitski) (PP)
	1–3	37:47 – Savitski (Daniyar) (SH)

2 min
Penalties
4 min
29
Shots
24

=== Poland vs Latvia ===
11 May 2024; 16:20	Poland	4–5 OT (1–0, 1–1, 2–3) (OT: 0–1)	Latvia	Ostravar Aréna, Ostrava; Attendance: 9,109

Game reference

John Murray
Goalies
Elvis Merzļikins
Referees:
(Czech Republic) Jan Hribik
(Canada) Mark Pearce
Linesmen:
(Switzerland) Dario Fuchs
(Canada) Tarrington Wyonzek

Maciaś (Michalski) – 15:29	1–0
	1–1	22:18 – Mamčics (Ansons, Indrašis)
Wałęga (Urbanowicz, Dronia) – 28:15	2–1
	2–2	42:32 – Ābols (Daugaviņš) (SH)
Maciaś (Dziubiński) – 47:56	3–2
	3–3	52:25 – Daugaviņš (Zīle, Dzierkals)
	3–4	54:54 – Ri. Bukarts (Ro. Bukarts, Batņa)
Bryk (Michalski) – 56:24	4–4
	4–5	63:29 – Daugaviņš (Ābols)

4 min
Penalties
8 min
22
Shots
37

=== United States vs Germany ===
11 May 2024; 20:20	United States	6–1 (2–0, 2–1, 2–0)	Germany	Ostravar Aréna, Ostrava; Attendance: 9,109

Game reference

Alex Lyon
Trey Augustine
Goalies
Mathias Niederberger
Referees:
(Sweden) Tobias Björk
(Finland) Mikko Kaukokari
Linesmen:
(Finland) Lauri Nikulainen
(Sweden) Emil Yletyinen

Tkachuk (Kesselring, Leonard) – 12:15	1–0
Kesselring (Nelson, Gaudreau) – 17:20	2–0
Gaudreau (Boldy, Caufield) (PP) – 32:23	3–0
	3–1	34:05 – Ehliz (Pföderl, Michaelis)
Hughes (Caufield, Pinto) – 39:57	4–1
Zegras (Pinto) (PP) – 50:09	5–1
Eyssimont (Kunin, Jones) – 52:28	6–1

2 min
Penalties
6 min
43
Shots
26

=== Slovakia vs Kazakhstan ===
12 May 2024; 12:20	Slovakia	6–2 (3–0, 1–1, 2–1)	Kazakhstan	Ostravar Aréna, Ostrava; Attendance: 9,109

Game reference

Stanislav Škorvánek
Goalies
Andrei Shutov
Nikita Boyarkin
Referees:
(Czech Republic) Martin Fraňo
(Finland) Mikko Kaukokari
Linesmen:
(United States) Kevin Briganti
(Switzerland) Dario Fuchs

Pospíšil (Nemec, Slafkovský) – 11:54	1–0
Faško-Rudáš (Koch, Sukeľ) – 12:28	2–0
Sukeľ (Faško-Rudáš, Gajdoš) – 17:56	3–0
	3–1	32:02 – Asetov (Daniyar, Mukhametov) (EA)
Hudáček (PS) – 28:28	4–1
Pospíšil (Hudáček, Nemec) – 41:18	5–1
Cingel (Hudáček) – 45:06	6–1
	6–2	51:05 – Omirbekov (Mikhailis, Daniyar)

10 min
Penalties
8 min
42
Shots
16

=== Latvia vs France ===
12 May 2024; 16:20	Latvia	3–2 OT (0–1, 0–0, 2–1) (OT: 1–0)	France	Ostravar Aréna, Ostrava; Attendance: 8,525

Game reference

Elvis Merzļikins
Goalies
Julian Junca
Referees:
(Sweden) Tobias Björk
(Finland) Lassi Heikkinen
Linesmen:
(Czech Republic) Jiří Ondráček
(Sweden) Emil Yletyinen

	0–1	16:02 – Da Costa (Auvitu, Bertrand) (PP2)
Ābols (Freibergs, Dzierkals) – 42:59	1–1
Ro. Bukarts (Daugaviņš, Jaks) (PP) – 51:48	2–1
	2–2	56:51 – Bellemare (Da Costa)
Daugaviņš – 64:59	3–2

29 min
Penalties
35 min
36
Shots
29

=== Sweden vs Poland ===
12 May 2024; 20:20	Sweden	5–1 (2–0, 1–0, 2–1)	Poland	Ostravar Aréna, Ostrava; Attendance: 8,425

Game reference

Filip Gustavsson
Goalies
David Zabolotny
Referees:
(Canada) Michael Campbell
(Switzerland) Michael Tscherrig
Linesmen:
(Finland) Lauri Nikulainen
(Canada) Tarrington Wyonzek

M. Johansson (Hedman, Karlsson) – 03:34	1–0
Raymond (Kempe) – 06:17	2–0
Karlsson (Burakovsky, M. Johansson) – 32:31	3–0
	3–1	42:18 – Łyszczarczyk
Burakovsky (Dahlin, Olofsson) (PP) – 54:27	4–1
Karlsson (Hedman, Gustavsson) (PP) – 55:25	5–1

4 min
Penalties
10 min
38
Shots
15

=== United States vs Slovakia ===
13 May 2024; 16:20	United States	4–5 OT (0–2, 1–2, 3–0) (OT: 0–1)	Slovakia	Ostravar Aréna, Ostrava; Attendance: 9,109

Game reference

Alex Nedeljkovic
Trey Augustine
Goalies
Samuel Hlavaj
Referees:
(Canada) Michael Campbell
(Canada) Mark Pearce
Linesmen:
(Czech Republic) Josef Špůr
(Sweden) Emil Yletyinen

	0–1	03:17 – Kelemen (Sukeľ, Kudrna)
	0–2	11:26 – Hudáček (Tatar)
Boldy (Hughes, Gaudreau) – 24:48	1–2
	1–3	27:03 – Nemec (Fehérváry, Pospíšil)
	1–4	28:47 – Koch (Pospíšil, Kelemen)
Pinto (Farabee, Zegras) – 44:32	2–4
Tkachuk (Pinto) – 53:56	3–4
Hughes (Sanderson) – 56:38	4–4
	4–5	63:56 – Kelemen (Nemec, Pospíšil)

8 min
Penalties
8 min
43
Shots
25

=== Germany vs Sweden ===
13 May 2024; 20:20	Germany	1–6 (0–3, 0–2, 1–1)	Sweden	Ostravar Aréna, Ostrava; Attendance: 8,309

Game reference

Philipp Grubauer
Mathias Niederberger
Goalies
Samuel Ersson
Referees:
(Czech Republic) Jan Hribik
(Switzerland) Michael Tscherrig
Linesmen:
(Czech Republic) Jiří Ondráček
(Canada) Tarrington Wyonzek

	0–1	02:54 – E. Karlsson (Frödén)
	0–2	14:52 – Pettersson (Heed, Burakovsky)
	0–3	19:57 – Olofsson (Dahlin, Burakovsky) (PP)
	0–4	24:31 – Grundström (Dahlin, L. Johansson)
	0–5	29:22 – Burakovsky (Holmberg, M. Johansson)
Pföderl (Michaelis, Ehliz) – 47:38	1–5
	1–6	51:08 – Lundeström (Karlsson, Bengtsson)

14 min
Penalties
2 min
16
Shots
46

=== Kazakhstan vs Latvia ===
14 May 2024; 16:20	Kazakhstan	0–2 (0–0, 0–2, 0–0)	Latvia	Ostravar Aréna, Ostrava; Attendance: 7,025

Game reference
Andrei Shutov	Goalies	Kristers Gudļevskis	Referees: (Sweden) Tobias Björk (Finland) Kristian Vikman; Linesmen: (United States) Nick Briganti (Germany) Andreas Hofer
0–1 / 31:48 – Ro. Bukarts (Batņa); 0–2 / 35:22 – Egle			Referees: (Sweden) Tobias Björk (Finland) Kristian Vikman; Linesmen: (United States) Nick Briganti (Germany) Andreas Hofer
2 min	Penalties	8 min	Referees: (Sweden) Tobias Björk (Finland) Kristian Vikman; Linesmen: (United States) Nick Briganti (Germany) Andreas Hofer
22	Shots	26	Referees: (Sweden) Tobias Björk (Finland) Kristian Vikman; Linesmen: (United States) Nick Briganti (Germany) Andreas Hofer

=== Poland vs France ===
14 May 2024; 20:20	Poland	2–4 (0–2, 2–2, 0–0)	France	Ostravar Aréna, Ostrava; Attendance: 6,797

Game reference

John Murray
Tomáš Fučík
Goalies
Sebastian Ylönen
Referees:
(Finland) Riku Brander
(Czech Republic) Martin Fraňo
Linesmen:
(Switzerland) Dario Fuchs
(Finland) Lauri Nikulainen

	0–1	08:47 – Addamo (Treille, Gallet)
	0–2	11:32 – Addamo (Auvitu, K. Bozon)
	0–3	24:21 – Da Costa (Chakiachvili) (PP)
	0–4	27:46 – Bellemare (Da Costa, Auvitu) (PP)
Paś (Zygmunt, Wałęga) – 36:08	1–4
Fraszko (Wronka) – 37:39	2–4

8 min
Penalties
8 min
25
Shots
32

=== Germany vs Latvia ===
15 May 2024; 16:20	Germany	8–1 (2–0, 5–1, 1–0)	Latvia	Ostravar Aréna, Ostrava; Attendance: 8,652

Game reference

Philipp Grubauer
Goalies
Kristers Gudļevskis
Elvis Merzļikins
Referees:
(Finland) Riku Brander
(Canada) Michael Campbell
Linesmen:
(Czech Republic) Jiří Ondráček
(Czech Republic) Josef Špůr

Kahun (Kälble, Tiffels) – 05:27	1–0
Wissmann (PP) – 18:05	2–0
Pföderl (Ehliz, J. Müller) – 20:48	3–0
Tuomie (Kastner, Ugbelike) – 22:42	4–0
Peterka (Reichel, Wissmann) (PP) – 25:37	5–0
Michaelis (Ehliz, J. Müller) (PP) – 30:54	6–0
Peterka (Stachowiak, Reichel) – 35:53	7–0
	7–1	39:02 – Komuls (Dzierkals)
Sturm – 44:28	8–1

6 min
Penalties
12 min
31
Shots
21

=== Slovakia vs Poland ===
15 May 2024; 20:20	Slovakia	4–0 (2–0, 0–0, 2–0)	Poland	Ostravar Aréna, Ostrava; Attendance: 9,109

Game reference

Samuel Hlavaj
Goalies
Tomáš Fučík
David Zabolotny
Referees:
(Czech Republic) Jan Hribik
(Canada) Mark Pearce
Linesmen:
(United States) Nick Briganti
(Sweden) Emil Yletyinen

Cingel (Tatar, Koch) – 02:03	1–0
Tatar (Nemec, Hudáček) – 11:46	2–0
Cehlárik (Slafkovský) – 57:22	3–0
Cingel (Koch, Tatar) – 57:34	4–0

6 min
Penalties
8 min
44
Shots
20

=== Kazakhstan vs Sweden ===
16 May 2024; 16:20	Kazakhstan	1–3 (0–1, 0–1, 1–1)	Sweden	Ostravar Aréna, Ostrava; Attendance: 5,378

Game reference

Nikita Boyarkin
Goalies
Samuel Ersson
Referees:
(Czech Republic) Martin Fraňo
(Canada) Mark Pearce
Linesmen:
(United States) Nick Briganti
(Germany) Andreas Hofer

	0–1	10:20 – M. Johansson (Burakovsky, Brodin)
	0–2	35:08 – L. Johansson (Frödén, Pettersson) (SH)
	0–3	41:51 – Zetterlund (Lundeström)
Beketayev (Rymarev, Starchenko) – 45:36	1–3

31 min
Penalties
4 min
11
Shots
44

=== United States vs France ===
16 May 2024; 20:20	United States	5–0 (4–0, 0–0, 1–0)	France	Ostravar Aréna, Ostrava; Attendance: 5,494

Game reference

Alex Nedeljkovic
Goalies
Julian Junca
Quentin Papillon
Referees:
(Sweden) Christoffer Holm
(Sweden) Mikael Holm
Linesmen:
(Slovakia) Oto Durmis
(Switzerland) Dario Fuchs

Nelson (Boldy, Jones) – 00:45	1–0
Boldy (Sanderson, Hughes) – 03:24	2–0
Boldy (Gaudreau, Nelson) – 12:30	3–0
Gaudreau (Werenski, Nelson) – 18:07	4–0
Pinto (Tkachuk) – 57:52	5–0

0 min
Penalties
8 min
54
Shots
10

=== Germany vs Kazakhstan ===
17 May 2024; 16:20	Germany	8–2 (2–1, 3–0, 3–1)	Kazakhstan	Ostravar Aréna, Ostrava; Attendance: 8,479

Game reference

Philipp Grubauer
Goalies
Andrei Shutov
Referees:
(Sweden) Mikael Holm
(Finland) Kristian Vikman
Linesmen:
(United States) Nick Briganti
(Czech Republic) Josef Špůr

Szuber (Stachowiak, Peterka) – 01:02	1–0
Tuomie (Kastner, Ugbelike) – 02:24	2–0
	2–1	07:59 – Starchenko (Rymarev, Panyukov) (PP)
Peterka (Stachowiak, Wissmann) – 21:11	3–1
Reichel (Pföderl) – 28:29	4–1
Kälble (Peterka, Stachowiak) – 35:17	5–1
Reichel (Peterka, Stachowiak) – 50:27	6–1
	6–2	51:52 – Korolyov (Boiko, Assetov)
Tiffels (Sturm) (SH) – 54:14	7–2
Kastner (Ehl, Tuomie) – 58:34	8–2

6 min
Penalties
2 min
35
Shots
20

=== Poland vs United States ===
17 May 2024; 20:20	Poland	1–4 (0–0, 0–2, 1–2)	United States	Ostravar Aréna, Ostrava; Attendance: 8,935

Game reference

John Murray
Goalies
Trey Augustine
Referees:
(Finland) Riku Brander
(Sweden) Christoffer Holm
Linesmen:
(Slovakia) Oto Durmis
(Czech Republic) Jiří Ondráček

	0–1	30:11 – Kesselring (Tkachuk, Vlasic)
	0–2	39:17 – Tkachuk (Pinto, Sanderson)
	0–3	41:11 – Caufield (Tkachuk)
Pasiut (Wronka, Kolusz) – 46:22	1–3
	1–4	49:15 – Caufield (Tkachuk, Pinto)

2 min
Penalties
8 min
21
Shots
57

=== Latvia vs Sweden ===
18 May 2024; 12:20	Latvia	2–7 (0–2, 2–4, 0–1)	Sweden	Ostravar Aréna, Ostrava; Attendance: 9,109

Game reference

Elvis Merzļikins
Ēriks Vītols
Goalies
Filip Gustavsson
Referees:
(Canada) Michael Campbell
(Slovakia) Tomáš Hronský
Linesmen:
(Slovakia) Oto Durmis
(United States) Shane Gustafson

	0–1	04:50 – Dahlin (Olofsson)
	0–2	06:57 – Brodin (M. Johansson, Kempe)
Daugaviņš (Komuls, Ri. Bukarts) – 22:54	1–2
Mamčics (Dzierkals, Batņa) – 23:17	2–2
	2–3	32:59 – Zetterlund (Lundeström, Karlsson)
	2–4	33:16 – Zetterlund
	2–5	33:25 – Eriksson Ek (M. Johansson, Heed)
	2–6	35:36 – Pettersson (Burakovsky, Raymond)
	2–7	58:51 – M. Johansson (Holmberg, Bengtsson) (SH)

18 min
Penalties
35 min
23
Shots
34

=== Germany vs Poland ===
18 May 2024; 16:20	Germany	4–2 (0–0, 2–0, 2–2)	Poland	Ostravar Aréna, Ostrava; Attendance: 9,109

Game reference

Mathias Niederberger
Goalies
David Zabolotny
Referees:
(Sweden) Mikael Holm
(Finland) Kristian Vikman
Linesmen:
(United States) Nick Briganti
(Sweden) Anders Nyqvist

Ehl (Kastner, Tuomie) – 25:14	1–0
Peterka (PS) – 35:17	2–0
Ehliz (Pföderl, Michaelis) – 44:28	3–0
	3–1	53:13 – Wajda (Łyszczarczyk, Dziubiński)
	3–2	55:19 – Komorski (Kostek, Krężołek)
Peterka (Reichel) – 56:11	4–2

4 min
Penalties
4 min
35
Shots
21

=== France vs Slovakia ===
18 May 2024; 20:20	France	2–4 (0–1, 1–2, 1–1)	Slovakia	Ostravar Aréna, Ostrava; Attendance: 9,109

Game reference

Sebastian Ylönen
Quentin Papillon
Goalies
Samuel Hlavaj
Referees:
(Latvia) Andris Ansons
(Czech Republic) Martin Fraňo
Linesmen:
(Germany) Andreas Hofer
(Sweden) Ludvig Lundgren

	0–1	19:56 – Regenda (Grman, Cingel)
	0–2	22:35 – Hudáček (Nemec, Slafkovský)
	0–3	29:56 – Hudáček
Treille (Bozon, Auvitu) – 35:44	1–3
	1–4	48:24 – Grman (Tatar, Hudáček)
Chakiachvili (Rech) – 59:53	2–4

8 min
Penalties
6 min
27
Shots
24

=== United States vs Kazakhstan ===
19 May 2024; 16:20	United States	10–1 (4–0, 3–0, 3–1)	Kazakhstan	Ostravar Aréna, Ostrava; Attendance: 8,468

Game reference

Alex Nedeljkovic
Goalies
Nikita Boyarkin
Andrei Shutov
Referees:
(Finland) Riku Brander
(Slovakia) Tomáš Hronský
Linesmen:
(Slovakia) Oto Durmis
(Sweden) Anders Nyqvist

Boldy (Nelson, Hughes) – 04:37	1–0
Tkachuk (Werenski, Gaudreau) (PP) – 07:16	2–0
Nelson (Sanderson, Boldy) – 16:50	3–0
Tkachuk (Werenski, Gaudreau) (PP) – 18:28	4–0
Brindley (Kessel, Kunin) – 21:39	5–0
Boldy (Gaudreau, Tkachuk) (PP) – 23:32	6–0
Kunin (Boldy, Werenski) – 31:04	7–0
Tkachuk (Boldy, Gaudreau) (PP) – 45:21	8–0
Hayes (Petry) – 45:42	9–0
	9–1	46:57 – Omirbekov (Korolyov, Starchenko)
Gaudreau (Boldy) – 50:06	10–1

4 min
Penalties
14 min
58
Shots
14

=== Slovakia vs Latvia ===
19 May 2024; 20:20	Slovakia	2–3 GWS (0–1, 0–0, 2–1) (OT: 0–0) (SO: 0–1)	Latvia	Ostravar Aréna, Ostrava; Attendance: 9,109

Game reference

Samuel Hlavaj
Goalies
Kristers Gudļevskis
Referees:
(Sweden) Christoffer Holm
(Finland) Kristian Vikman
Linesmen:
(Germany) Tim Heffner
(Germany) Andreas Hofer

	0–1	18:39 – Freibergs (Indrašis, Ro. Bukarts)
Pospíšil (Regenda, Ivan) – 42:06	1–1
Cehlárik (Slafkovský, Hrivík) – 58:16	2–1
	2–2	58:40 – Cibuļskis (Jaks, Indrašis) (EA)

Hudáček (miss)
Slafkovský
Sukeľ (miss)
Cingel (miss)
Tatar (miss)
Hudáček (miss)
Slafkovský (miss)
Shootout
(miss) Ābols
Ločmelis
(miss) Ro. Bukarts
(miss) Daugaviņš
(miss) Krastenbergs
(miss) Daugaviņš
Ločmelis
10 min
Penalties
10 min
43
Shots
43

=== Sweden vs France ===
20 May 2024; 16:20	Sweden	3–1 (0–0, 1–1, 2–0)	France	Ostravar Aréna, Ostrava; Attendance: 6,805

Game reference

Samuel Ersson
Goalies
Quentin Papillon
Referees:
(Germany) André Schrader
(Finland) Kristian Vikman
Linesmen:
(Germany) Tim Heffner
(Czech Republic) Daniel Hynek

Raymond (Burakovsky, Holmberg) – 28:00	1–0
	1–1	29:23 – Bertrand (Boudon, Rech)
Karlsson (Hedman, Kempe) (PP) – 41:29	2–1
Burakovsky (Holmberg) (EN) – 59:56	3–1

4 min
Penalties
6 min
38
Shots
13

=== Kazakhstan vs Poland ===
20 May 2024; 20:20	Kazakhstan	3–1 (1–1, 0–0, 2–0)	Poland	Ostravar Aréna, Ostrava; Attendance: 9,109

Game reference

Andrei Shutov
Goalies
John Murray
Referees:
(Latvia) Andris Ansons
(United States) Sean MacFarlane
Linesmen:
(Sweden) Ludvig Lundgren
(Sweden) Anders Nyqvist

	0–1	09:11 – Wałęga (Łyszczarczyk, Bryk) (PP)
Mikhailis (Shestakov) – 12:35	1–1
Orekhov (Mikhailis, Daniyar) – 50:20	2–1
Starchenko – 54:25	3–1

10 min
Penalties
4 min
22
Shots
24

=== France vs Germany ===
21 May 2024; 12:20	France	3–6 (1–1, 2–3, 0–2)	Germany	Ostravar Aréna, Ostrava; Attendance: 9,109

Game reference

Quentin Papillon
Julian Junca
Goalies
Philipp Grubauer
Referees:
(Sweden) Christoffer Holm
(Slovakia) Tomáš Hronský
Linesmen:
(Czech Republic) Daniel Hynek
(Sweden) Ludvig Lundgren

Claireaux (Addamo, Perret) – 16:49	1–0
	1–1	19:04 – Michaelis (Kahun, Ehliz)
Rech (Boudon, Chakiachvili) – 21:09	2–1
	2–2	25:56 – Kalble (Stachowiak, Peterka)
Treille (T. Bozon, Guebey) – 26:18	3–2
	3–3	31:01 – Stachowiak (Reichel)
	3–4	31:23 – Kastner (Michaelis, Szuber)
	3–5	41:19 – Stachowiak
	3–6	44:50 – Reichel (Sturm, Pföderl) (PP)

16 min
Penalties
29 min
23
Shots
40

=== Latvia vs United States ===
21 May 2024; 16:20	Latvia	3–6 (0–2, 1–1, 2–3)	United States	Ostravar Aréna, Ostrava; Attendance: 8,924

Game reference

Kristers Gudļevskis
Goalies
Charlie Lindgren
Referees:
(Finland) Riku Brander
(Sweden) Mikael Holm
Linesmen:
(Germany) Tim Heffner
(Germany) Andreas Hofer

	0–1	01:23 – Tkachuk (Caufield)
	0–2	13:20 – Werenski (Caufield, Pinto)
	0–3	22:34 – Caufield (Boldy, Tkachuk) (PP)
Krastenbergs (Tralmaks, Gudļevskis) – 23:35	1–3
	1–4	40:15 – Boldy (Werenski, Jones)
Tralmaks (Zīle, Laviņš) – 44:44	2–4
Mamčics (Daugaviņš) – 45:00	3–4
	3–5	48:46 – Caufield (Pinto)
	3–6	59:15 – Farabee (SH, EN, AG)

12 min
Penalties
18 min
30
Shots
43

=== Sweden vs Slovakia ===
21 May 2024; 20:20	Sweden	6–1 (1–0, 3–0, 2–1)	Slovakia	Ostravar Aréna, Ostrava; Attendance: 9,109

Game reference

Filip Gustavsson
Goalies
Stanislav Škorvánek
Referees:
(United States) Sean MacFarlane
(Germany) André Schrader
Linesmen:
(United States) Nick Briganti
(United States) Shane Gustafson

Raymond (Hedman, Kempe) (PP) – 02:20	1–0
Karlsson (Holmberg, Raymond) – 27:31	2–0
Burakovsky (Karlsson, Zetterlund) (PP) – 32:38	3–0
Lundeström (Olofsson) – 33:15	4–0
Eriksson Ek (Brodin) (SH) – 49:15	5–0
	5–1	50:49 – Ivan (Tatar, Slafkovský)
Eriksson Ek (Karlsson, Dahlin) – 57:35	6–1

12 min
Penalties
12 min
43
Shots
18
