= 2024 IIHF World Championship =

2024 edition of the IIHF World Championship

Tournament details
- Host country: Czechia
- Venues: 2 (in 2 host cities)
- Dates: 10–26 May
- Opened by: Petr Pavel
- Teams: 16

Final positions
- Champions: Czechia (7th title)
- Runners-up: Switzerland
- Third place: Sweden
- Fourth place: Canada

Tournament statistics
- Games played: 64
- Goals scored: 398 (6.22 per game)
- Attendance: 797,727 (12,464 per game)
- Scoring leader: (United States) Matt Boldy (14 points)

Awards
- MVP: (Switzerland) Kevin Fiala

The 2024 IIHF World Championship was hosted by Czechia from 10 to 26 May 2024. It was held in Prague and Ostrava, and organized by the International Ice Hockey Federation. It was the most attended Hockey Championship in history with a total attendance of 797,727 spectators.

Hosts Czechia won the title for the seventh time, beating Switzerland 2–0 in the final. Czechia ended their 14-year gold drought after winning it for the first time since 2010. It was the third title won on homesoil in the 21st century, after Sweden in 2013 and Finland in 2022. Sweden won the bronze medal, defeating Canada 4–2 in the third place match. This tournament marked the first time since 2014 that all three medalists were European teams.

== Bids ==
Prague and Ostrava were officially announced as venues of the championship on 24 May 2019 in Bratislava, Slovakia. The two cities co-hosted the 2015 IIHF World Championship, the last tournament to be held in the country. The city of Brno wanted to build a new ice hockey hall to co-host the championship. Martin Urban, general secretary of the hockey association, confirmed Brno would not be considered as a host city without the new arena.

== Rosters ==
Each team's roster consisted of at least 15 skaters (forwards and defencemen) and two goaltenders, and at most 22 skaters and three goaltenders. All 16 participating nations, through the confirmation of their respective national associations, had to submit a "Long List" no later than two weeks before the tournament, and a final roster by the Passport Control meeting prior to the start of the tournament.

== Marketing ==
According to estimates, fans' spending during the championship could reach two billion CZK. The medal weighing 250 grams with cut glass was produced by the Kolektiv Ateliers studio in Nový Bor. As in the previous Czech World Championship 2015, the mascots were announced as rabbit duo Bob and Bobek. For this tournament, they have blue jerseys instead of their previous red, with their numbers 20 and 24 corresponding to the year of the event. The total attendance was 797,727 viewers, it broke the audience record of World Championship 2015.

== Venues ==
Prague	2024 IIHF World Championship is located in Czech Republic	Ostrava
O_{2} Arena; Capacity: 17,413	2024 IIHF World Championship is located in Czech Republic	Ostravar Aréna; Capacity: 9,109

== Participants ==
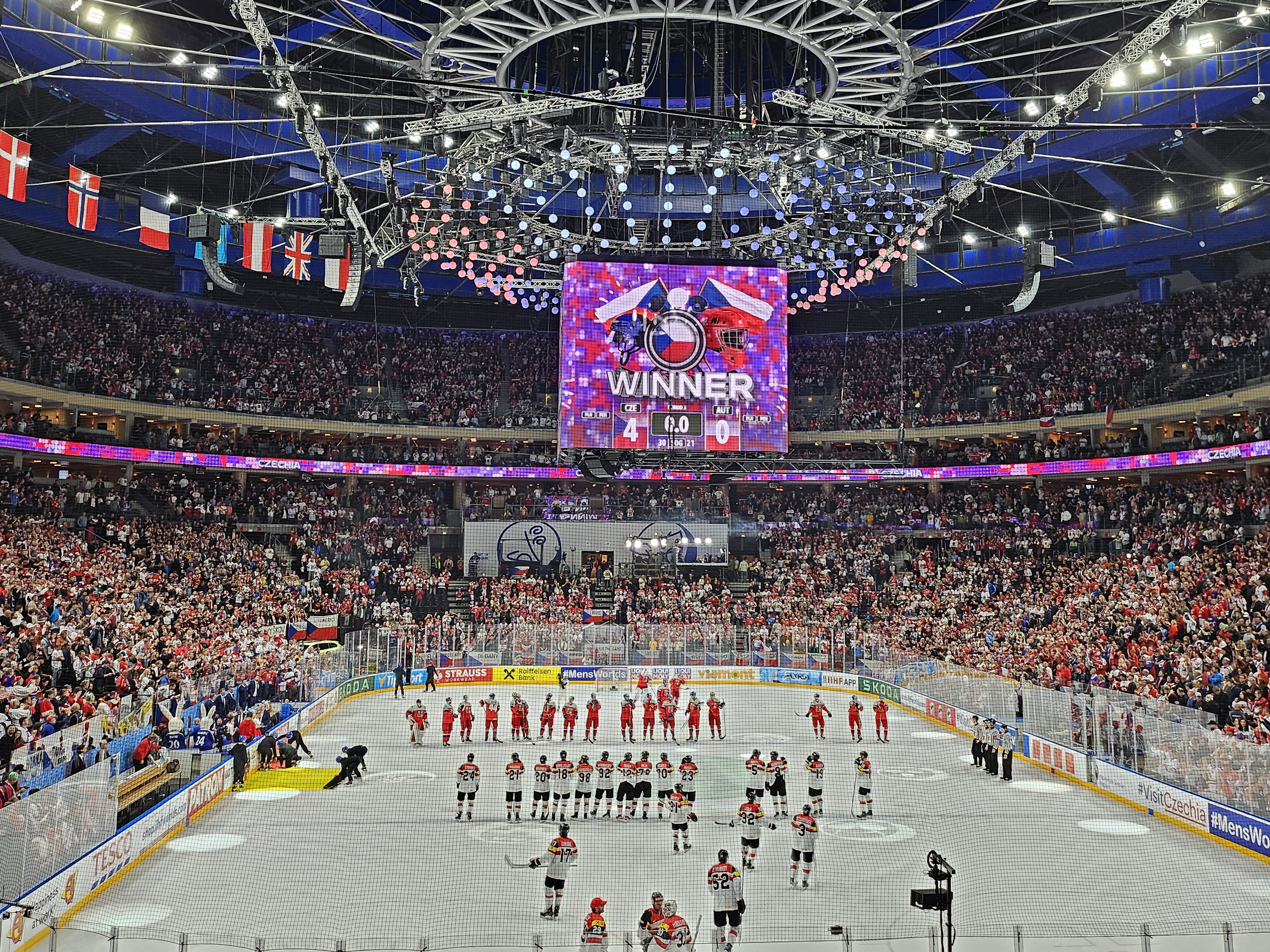
A World Championship match in O2 Arena

Qualified as hosts

- Czechia

Automatic qualifier after a top 14 placement at the 2023 IIHF World Championship

- Austria
- Canada
- Denmark
- Finland
- France
- Germany
- Kazakhstan
- Latvia
- Norway
- Slovakia
- Sweden
- Switzerland
- United States

Qualified through winning promotion at the 2023 IIHF World Championship Division I

- Great Britain
- Poland

== Seeding ==
The seedings in the preliminary round are based on the 2023 IIHF World Ranking, as of the end of the 2023 IIHF World Championship, using the serpentine system while allowing the organizer, "to allocate a maximum of two teams to separate groups."

Group A (Prague)

- Canada (1)
- Finland (2)
- Switzerland (7)
- Czechia (8)
- Denmark (11)
- Norway (12)
- Austria (16)
- Great Britain (20)

Group B (Ostrava)

- United States (4)
- Germany (5)
- Sweden (6)
- Slovakia (9)
- Latvia (10)
- France (13)
- Kazakhstan (15)
- Poland (22)

== Match officials ==
16 referees and linesmen were announced on 9 May 2024.

Referees	Linesmen
(Canada) Michael Campbell; (Canada) Mark Pearce; (Czech Republic) Martin Fraňo; (Czech Republic) Jan Hribik; (Finland) Riku Brander; (Finland) Lassi Heikkinen; (Finland) Mikko Kaukokari; (Finland) Kristian Vikman; (Germany) André Schrader; (Latvia) Andris Ansons; (Slovakia) Tomáš Hronský; (Sweden) Tobias Björk; (Sweden) Christoffer Holm; (Sweden) Mikael Holm; (Switzerland) Michael Tscherrig; (United States) Sean MacFarlane	(Canada) Tarrington Wyonzek; (Czech Republic) Daniel Hynek; (Czech Republic) Jiří Ondráček; (Czech Republic) Josef Špůr; (Finland) Lauri Nikulainen; (Germany) Tim Heffner; (Germany) Andreas Hofer; (Latvia) Dāvis Zunde; (Slovakia) Oto Durmis; (Sweden) Ludvig Lundgren; (Sweden) Anders Nyqvist; (Sweden) Emil Yletyinen; (Switzerland) Dario Fuchs; (United States) Kevin Briganti; (United States) Nick Briganti; (United States) Shane Gustafson

== Preliminary round ==
The groups were announced on 28 May 2023, with the schedule being revealed on 15 August 2023.

=== Group A ===
Pos	Team	Pld	W	OTW	OTL	L	GF	GA	GD	Pts	Qualification or relegation
1	Canada	7	5	2	0	0	32	18	+14	19	Quarterfinals
2	Switzerland	7	5	1	0	1	29	12	+17	17	Quarterfinals
3	Czechia (H)	7	4	1	2	0	26	14	+12	16	Quarterfinals
4	Finland	7	3	0	1	3	21	14	+7	10	Quarterfinals
5	Austria	7	2	0	1	4	21	29	−8	7	Qualification for 2025 IIHF World Championship
6	Norway	7	2	0	0	5	15	25	−10	6 (Note: Denmark 0–2 Norway)	Qualification for 2025 IIHF World Championship
7	Denmark	7	2	0	0	5	15	29	−14	6	Qualification for 2025 IIHF World Championship
8	Great Britain	7	1	0	0	6	12	30	−18	3	Relegation to 2025 Division I A

Source: IIHF
Rules for classification: 1) points; 2) head-to-head points; 3) head-to-head goal difference; 4) head-to-head number of goals scored; 5) result against closest best-ranked team outside tied teams; 6) result against second-best-ranked team outside tied teams; 7) seeding before tournament
(H) Host
Notes:

10 May 2024
Switzerland	5–2	Norway
Czechia	1–0 (GWS)	Finland
11 May 2024
Great Britain	2–4	Canada
Austria	1–5	Denmark
Norway	3–6	Czechia
12 May 2024
Finland	8–0	Great Britain
Denmark	1–5	Canada
Austria	5–6	Switzerland
13 May 2024
Norway	1–4	Finland
Switzerland	2–1 (GWS)	Czechia
14 May 2024
Denmark	0–2	Norway
Canada	7–6 (OT)	Austria
15 May 2024
Czechia	7–4	Denmark
Switzerland	3–0	Great Britain
16 May 2024
Finland	2–3	Austria
Canada	4–1	Norway
17 May 2024
Great Britain	3–4	Denmark
Czechia	4–0	Austria
18 May 2024
Denmark	0–8	Switzerland
Canada	5–3	Finland
Czechia	4–1	Great Britain
19 May 2024
Norway	1–4	Austria
Switzerland	2–3	Canada
20 May 2024
Great Britain	2–5	Norway
Finland	3–1	Denmark
21 May 2024
Austria	2–4	Great Britain
Canada	4–3 (OT)	Czechia
Finland	1–3	Switzerland

=== Group B ===
Pos	Team	Pld	W	OTW	OTL	L	GF	GA	GD	Pts	Qualification or relegation
1	Sweden	7	7	0	0	0	35	9	+26	21	Quarterfinals
2	United States	7	5	0	1	1	37	16	+21	16	Quarterfinals
3	Germany	7	5	0	0	2	34	24	+10	15	Quarterfinals
4	Slovakia	7	3	1	1	2	26	23	+3	12	Quarterfinals
5	Latvia	7	1	3	0	3	19	29	−10	9	Qualification for 2025 IIHF World Championship
6	Kazakhstan	7	2	0	0	5	12	31	−19	6	Qualification for 2025 IIHF World Championship
7	France	7	1	0	1	5	13	26	−13	4	Qualification for 2025 IIHF World Championship
8	Poland	7	0	0	1	6	11	29	−18	1	Relegation to 2025 Division I A

Source: IIHF
Rules for classification: 1) points; 2) head-to-head points; 3) head-to-head goal difference; 4) head-to-head number of goals scored; 5) result against closest best-ranked team outside tied teams; 6) result against second-best-ranked team outside tied teams; 7) seeding before tournament

10 May 2024
Slovakia	4–6	Germany
Sweden	5–2	United States
11 May 2024
France	1–3	Kazakhstan
Poland	4–5 (OT)	Latvia
United States	6–1	Germany
12 May 2024
Slovakia	6–2	Kazakhstan
Latvia	3–2 (OT)	France
Sweden	5–1	Poland
13 May 2024
United States	4–5 (OT)	Slovakia
Germany	1–6	Sweden
14 May 2024
Kazakhstan	0–2	Latvia
Poland	2–4	France
15 May 2024
Germany	8–1	Latvia
Slovakia	4–0	Poland
16 May 2024
Kazakhstan	1–3	Sweden
United States	5–0	France
17 May 2024
Germany	8–2	Kazakhstan
Poland	1–4	United States
18 May 2024
Latvia	2–7	Sweden
Germany	4–2	Poland
France	2–4	Slovakia
19 May 2024
United States	10–1	Kazakhstan
Slovakia	2–3 (GWS)	Latvia
20 May 2024
Sweden	3–1	France
Kazakhstan	3–1	Poland
21 May 2024
France	3–6	Germany
Latvia	3–6	United States
Sweden	6–1	Slovakia

== Playoff round ==
Quarter-finals
23 May
1A Canada	6
4B Slovakia	3
23 May
1B Sweden (OT)	2
4A Finland	1
23 May
2A Switzerland	3
3B Germany	1
23 May
2B United States	0
3A Czechia	1

Semi-finals
25 May
1 Sweden	3
5 Czechia	7
25 May
2 Canada	2
3 Switzerland (GWS)	3

Final
26 May
5 Czechia	2
3 Switzerland	0
Third place
26 May
1 Sweden	4
2 Canada	2

=== Final ===
26 May 2024; 20:20	Switzerland	0–2 (0–0, 0–0, 0–2)	Czechia	O2 Arena, Prague; Attendance: 17,413

Game reference
Leonardo Genoni	Goalies	Lukáš Dostál	Referees: (Canada) Michael Campbell (Sweden) Mikael Holm; Linesmen: (United States) Nick Briganti (Sweden) Ludvig Lundgren
0–1 / 49:13 – Pastrňák (Kundrátek, Hájek); 0–2 / 59:41 – Kämpf (Kubalík, Nečas) (EN)			Referees: (Canada) Michael Campbell (Sweden) Mikael Holm; Linesmen: (United States) Nick Briganti (Sweden) Ludvig Lundgren
4 min	Penalties	4 min	Referees: (Canada) Michael Campbell (Sweden) Mikael Holm; Linesmen: (United States) Nick Briganti (Sweden) Ludvig Lundgren
31	Shots	32	Referees: (Canada) Michael Campbell (Sweden) Mikael Holm; Linesmen: (United States) Nick Briganti (Sweden) Ludvig Lundgren

== Final standings ==
Teams finishing fifth in the preliminary round were ranked ninth and tenth, teams finishing sixth were ranked 11th and 12th, and so on.

Pos	Grp	Team	Pld	W	OTW	OTL	L	GF	GA	GD	Pts	Final result
1	A	Czechia (H)	10	7	1	2	0	36	17	+19	25	Champions
2	A	Switzerland	10	6	2	0	2	35	17	+18	22	Runners-up
3	B	Sweden	10	8	1	0	1	44	19	+25	26	Third place
4	A	Canada	10	6	2	1	1	42	28	+14	23	Fourth place
5	B	United States	8	5	0	1	2	37	17	+20	16	Eliminated in Quarterfinals
6	B	Germany	8	5	0	0	3	35	27	+8	15	Eliminated in Quarterfinals
7	B	Slovakia	8	3	1	1	3	29	29	0	12	Eliminated in Quarterfinals
8	A	Finland	8	3	0	2	3	22	16	+6	11	Eliminated in Quarterfinals
9	B	Latvia	7	1	3	0	3	19	29	−10	9	Eliminated in Preliminary round
10	A	Austria	7	2	0	1	4	21	29	−8	7	Eliminated in Preliminary round
11	A	Norway	7	2	0	0	5	15	25	−10	6	Eliminated in Preliminary round
12	B	Kazakhstan	7	2	0	0	5	12	31	−19	6	Eliminated in Preliminary round
13	A	Denmark	7	2	0	0	5	15	29	−14	6	Eliminated in Preliminary round
14	B	France	7	1	0	1	5	13	26	−13	4	Eliminated in Preliminary round
15	A	Great Britain	7	1	0	0	6	12	30	−18	3	Relegated to 2025 IIHF World Championship Division I
16	B	Poland	7	0	0	1	6	11	29	−18	1	Relegated to 2025 IIHF World Championship Division I

Source: IIHF
Rules for classification: 1) position in the group; 2) number of points; 3) goal difference; 4) goals scored; 5) seeding before tournament.
(H) Host

== Statistics ==
=== Scoring leaders ===
List shows the top skaters sorted by points, then goals.

Player	GP	G	A	Pts	+/−	PIM	POS
(United States) Matt Boldy	8	6	8	14	+8	2	F
(Switzerland) Kevin Fiala	8	7	6	13	+6	27	F
(United States) Brady Tkachuk	8	7	6	13	+7	4	F
(Sweden) Marcus Johansson	9	6	6	12	+14	2	F
(Switzerland) Roman Josi	10	3	9	12	+4	4	D
(Canada) Dylan Cozens	10	9	2	11	+3	2	F
(Switzerland) Nico Hischier	10	6	5	11	+6	2	F
(Sweden) Erik Karlsson	10	6	5	11	+9	0	D
(Sweden) André Burakovsky	10	4	7	11	+8	0	F
(United States) Johnny Gaudreau	8	3	8	11	+8	0	F

GP = Games played; G = Goals; A = Assists; Pts = Points; +/− = Plus/Minus; PIM = Penalties in Minutes; POS = Position
Source: IIHF

=== Goaltending leaders ===
Only the top five goaltenders, based on save percentage, who have played at least 40 % of their team's minutes, are included in this list.

Player	TOI	GA	GAA	SA	Sv%	SO
(Switzerland) Leonardo Genoni	431:07	10	1.39	169	94.08	1
(Czech Republic) Lukáš Dostál	492:18	13	1.58	213	93.90	3
(Slovakia) Samuel Hlavaj	306:57	13	2.54	174	92.53	1
(Norway) Henrik Haukeland	297:00	13	2.63	155	91.61	1
(Latvia) Kristers Gudļevskis	207:05	11	3.19	117	90.60	1

TOI = time on ice (minutes:seconds); SA = shots against; GA = goals against; GAA = goals against average; Sv% = save percentage; SO = shutouts
Source: IIHF

== Awards ==
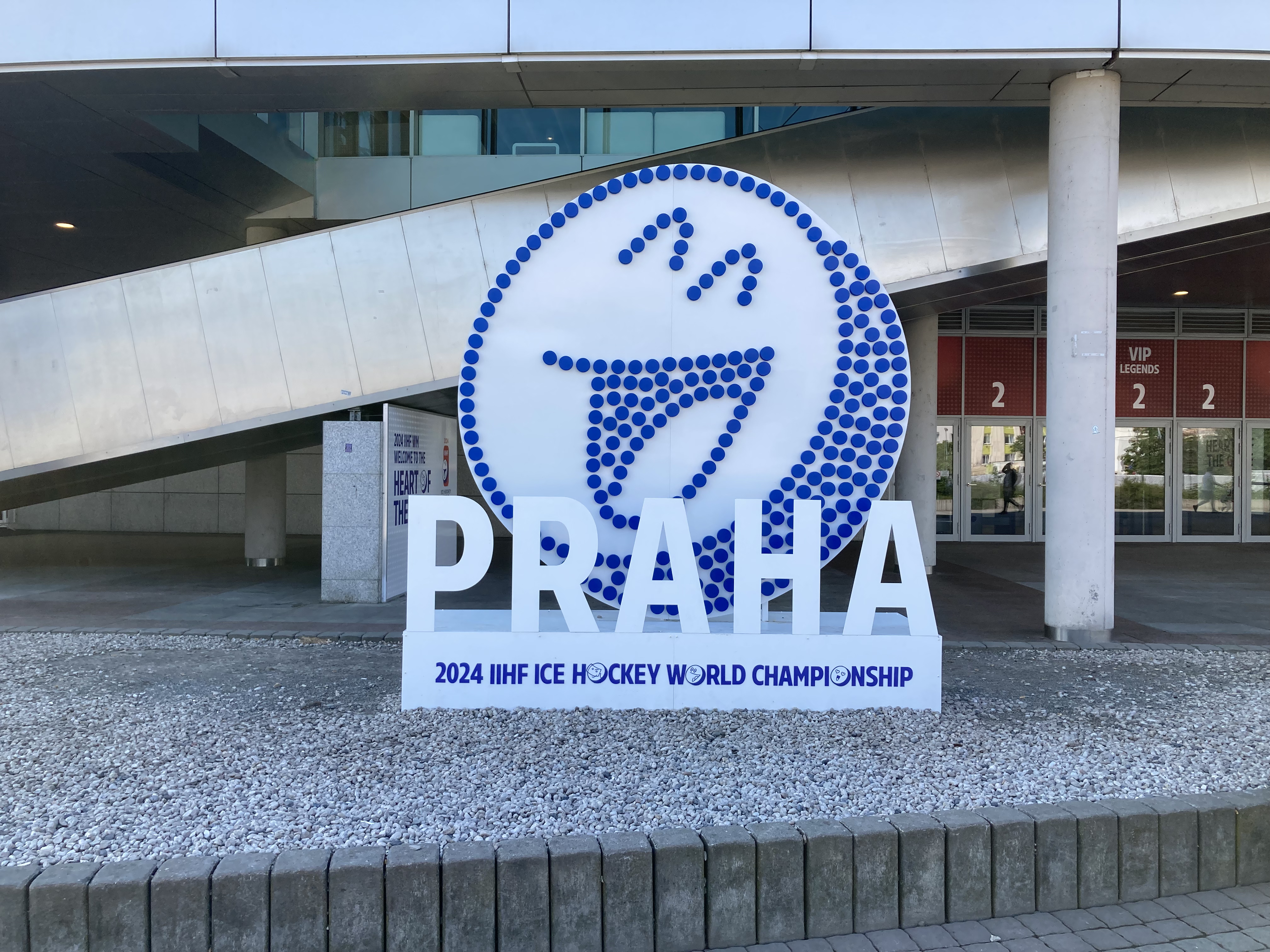
Championship promotion in front of the O2 Arena

The awards were announced on 26 May 2024.

=== Media All Stars ===
Position	Player
Goaltender	(Czech Republic) Lukáš Dostál
Defenceman	(Switzerland) Roman Josi
Defenceman	(Sweden) Erik Karlsson
Forward	(Switzerland) Kevin Fiala
Forward	(Canada) Dylan Cozens
Forward	(Czech Republic) Roman Červenka
MVP	(Switzerland) Kevin Fiala

=== Individual awards ===
Position	Player
Goaltender	(Czech Republic) Lukáš Dostál
Defenceman	(Switzerland) Roman Josi
Forward	(Switzerland) Kevin Fiala

== IIHF contributors' awards ==
The first annual IIHF contributors' awards ceremony was held prior to the semifinal games of the men's championship.

Award recipients

- Anatolii Brezvin of Ukraine received the Paul Loicq Award for outstanding contributions to international ice hockey.
- Dezső Varga of Romania received the Torriani Award for a player with an outstanding career from non-top hockey nation.
- The IIHF Milestone Award was given to the 1998 Czech Republic men's national ice hockey team.
- Markus Graf of Switzerland received the Johan Bollue Award for contributions to growth and development in youth ice hockey.
- Al Michaels of ABC Sports received the IIHF Media Award for outstanding contributions to international hockey through television, print, and radio.

== IIHF Hall of Fame induction ==
The annual IIHF Hall of Fame induction ceremony was held during the medal presentations of the men's championship.

IIHF Hall of Fame inductees

- Natalie Darwitz, United States
- Melody Davidson, Canada
- Jaromír Jágr, Czechia
- Kenny Jönsson, Sweden
- Igor Liba, Slovakia
- Petteri Nummelin, Finland
- Jaroslav Pouzar, Czechia
- Ryan Smyth, Canada (Note: Smyth was chosen for induction in 2020, but was delayed until 2024 due to the COVID-19 pandemic.)
