= Marcus Johansson (ice hockey, born 1990) =

Swedish ice hockey player (born 1990)

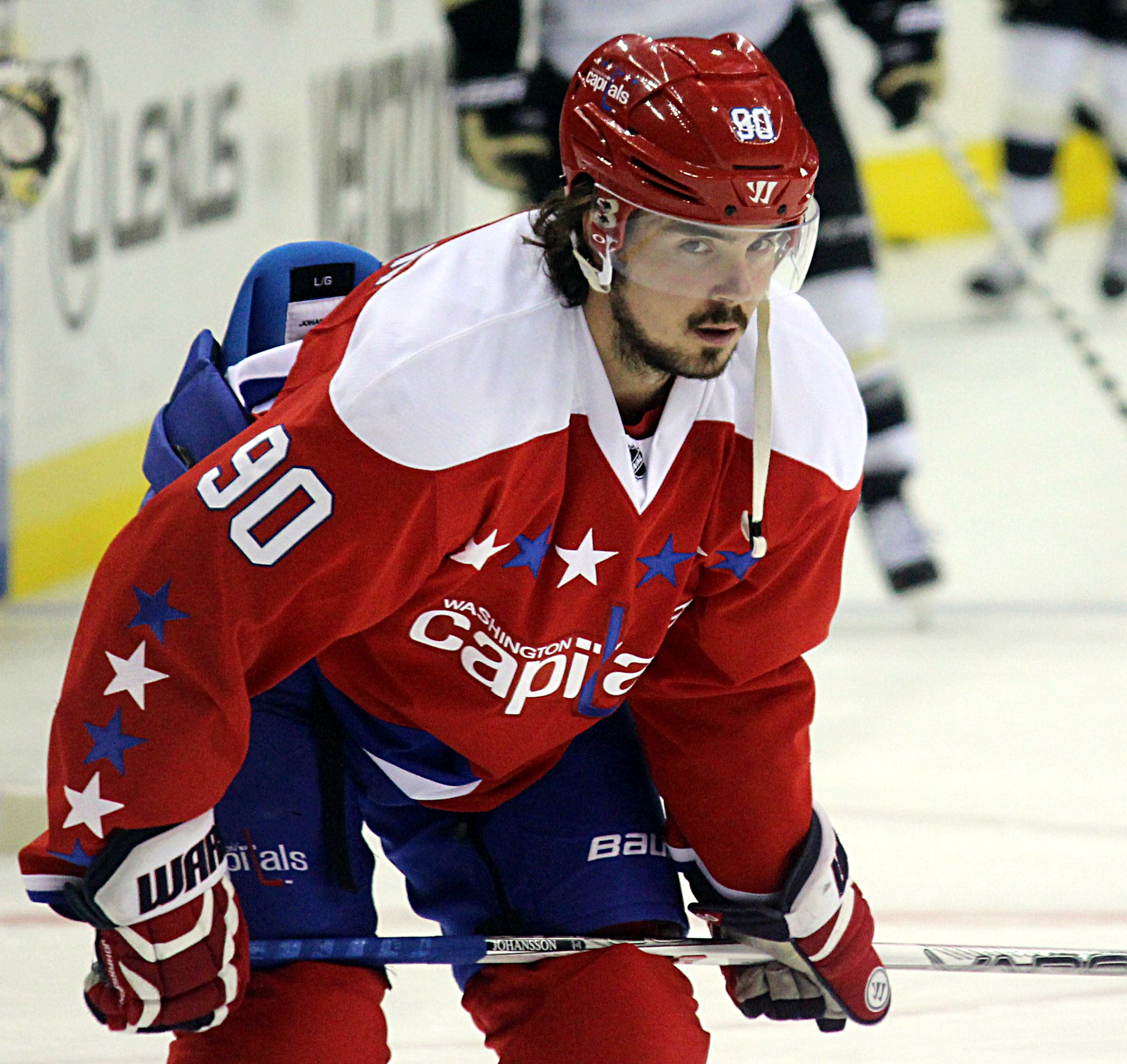
- Johansson with the Washington Capitals in 2016
- Born: 6 October 1990 (age 35) Landskrona, Sweden
- Height: 6 ft 1 in (185 cm)
- Weight: 203 lb (92 kg; 14 st 7 lb)
- Position: Forward
- Shoots: Left
- SHL team Former teams: Färjestad BK; Washington Capitals; New Jersey Devils; Boston Bruins; Buffalo Sabres; Minnesota Wild; Seattle Kraken
- National team: Sweden
- NHL draft: 24th overall, 2009; Washington Capitals
- Playing career: 2008–present

Marcus Lars Johansson (MAR-kəss yoh-HAHN-sən; born 6 October 1990) is a Swedish professional ice hockey player who is a forward for Färjestad BK of the Swedish Hockey League (SHL). He was selected by the Washington Capitals in the first round, 24th overall, of the 2009 NHL entry draft, and previously played in the National Hockey League (NHL) for the Capitals, New Jersey Devils, Boston Bruins, Buffalo Sabres, Minnesota Wild, and Seattle Kraken.

In 2008–09, Johansson was part of the Färjestad team won the Swedish championship. Johansson is nicknamed "Mackan" and "MoJo" by fans and comes from a hockey family.

== Playing career ==
=== Early career ===
In the 2005–06 season, Johansson recorded seven assists in 12 games for the IF Malmö in the under-18 HockeyAllsvenskan, Sweden's second-highest level of professional hockey. He also tallied four assists in six playoff games.

=== Professional career ===
==== Färjestad BK (2006–2010) ====
In 2006–07, Johansson played for Färjestad BK's under-18 team and scored five goals with nine assists, with eight penalties-in-minutes (PIM), in 12 games. In eight playoff games, he scored seven goals with three assists. In Sweden's under-17 TV-pucken tournament, he played eight games for Skåne and had five goals with five assists, including 41 PIM.

In 2007–08, Johansson split his second season with the Färjestad between their U18 team and on loan to Skåre in Sweden's third division before making his Elitserien debut in the playoffs. Johansson went scoreless three games, however, in the SEL playoffs. In 19 games with Skåre's senior team, he scored two goals and ten assists. He also scored 12 goals with 26 assists for Färjestad's U18 team. In the U18 playoffs, he scored four goals with eight assists in eight games.

In the 2008–09 season, Johansson saw limited ice time in his first full season in the SEL, as Färjestad BK finished the regular season at the top of the league, and continued to win the playoff championships. He scored five goals with five assists and was +4 in 45 games while averaging just less than 10 minutes of ice time per game. In the playoffs, he played in six of the team's 13 games and was a –1, averaging 7:23 minutes of ice time. Johansson was also loaned again to Skåre in Sweden's third league, where he scored five goals with five assists in ten games with the club.

At the 2009 NHL entry draft, Johansson was selected 24th overall by the Washington Capitals. Remaining in Sweden for the 2009–10 season, Johansson moved from winger to center in his second year with Färjestads and saw increased playing time with the Karlstad-based club. His ten goals were tied for fourth on the team, and he added ten assists in 42 games while averaging just over 14 minutes of ice time per game. For the season, he finished with an even plus-minus and just 10 PIM. Färjestads slipped to fifth, however, in the 12-team league, and fell to Skellefteå AIK in a seven-game series in the first round of the playoffs. Johansson had five assists and was an even plus-minus in the playoffs. In May 2010, he signed a three-year, entry-level contract with the Capitals.

==== Washington Capitals (2010–2017) ====
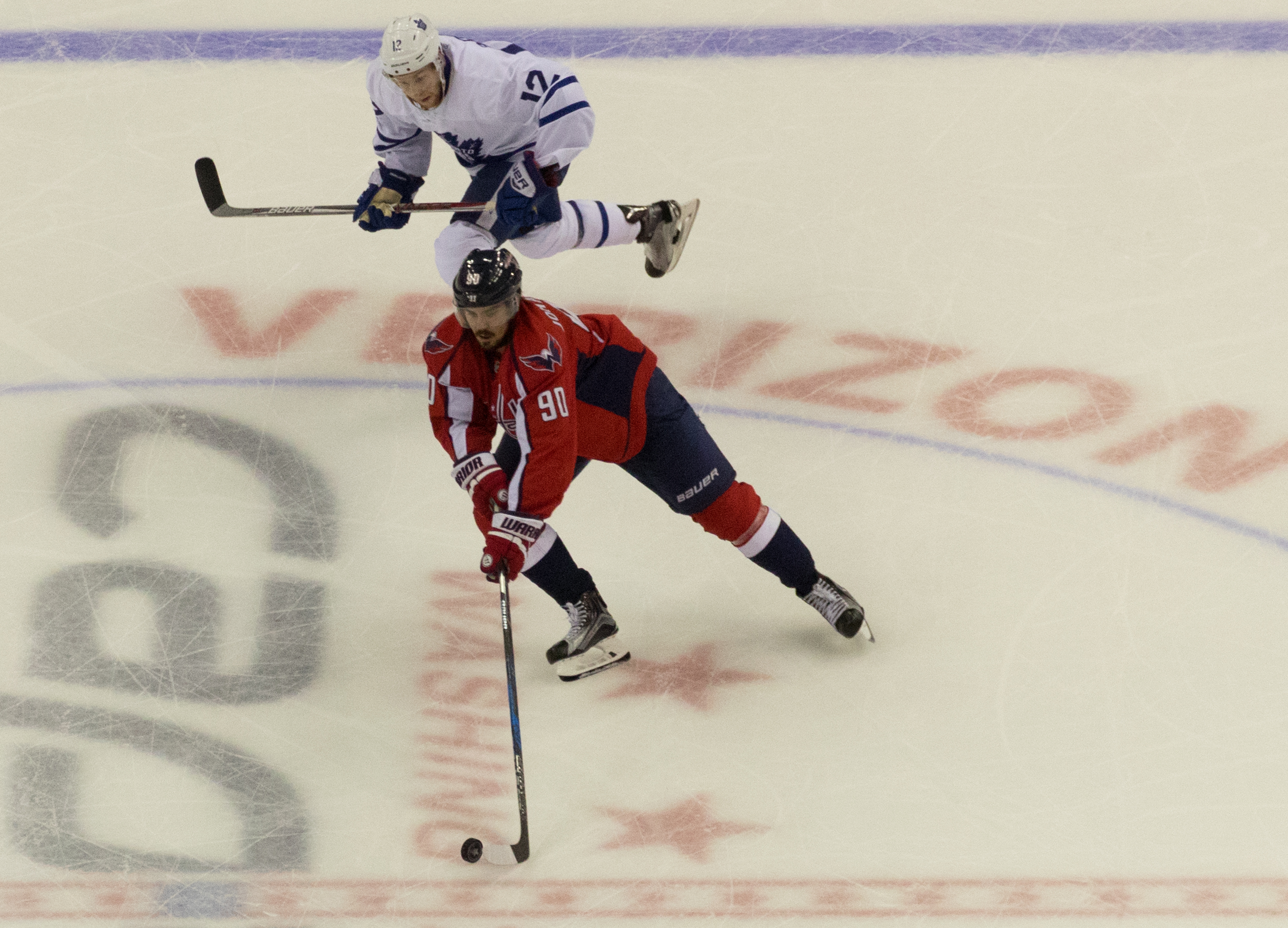
Johansson (foreground) advances with the puck during the game in the 2017 Stanley Cup playoffs

On 17 May 2010, Johansson was signed to a three-year entry-level contract with the Capitals. He recorded his first NHL goal on 19 October 2010 against Tim Thomas of the Boston Bruins. In his rookie season, in 2010–11, Johansson was a regular in Washington's lineup, typically centering the second or third lines. He played an average of 14:43 in 69 games, netting 13 goals and 14 assists. Following the 2014–15 NHL season Johansson became a restricted free agent under the NHL Collective Bargaining Agreement. The Washington Capitals made him a qualifying offer to retain his NHL rights and, on 5 July 2015, Johansson filed for Salary Arbitration.

==== New Jersey Devils (2017–2019) ====
With the Capitals facing cap constraints, on 3 July 2017, Johansson was traded to the New Jersey Devils in exchange for second and third round picks in 2018. On 5 July 2017, the Devils announced that Johansson would become the second player in team's history to wear a number in the 90–99 range after he chose to wear number 90 on his uniform.

==== Boston Bruins (2019) ====
During the 2018–19 season, while in his final year under contract and with the Devils out of playoff contention, Johansson was dealt at the trade deadline on 25 February 2019, to the Boston Bruins in exchange for a second round pick in 2019 and a fourth round pick in 2020.

Johansson would find chemistry with Bruins forwards Charlie Coyle and Danton Heinen on the Bruins' third line during the 2019 Stanley Cup playoffs. Johansson and the Bruins would make it all the way the 2019 Stanley Cup Finals, where they were defeated by the St. Louis Blues in seven games.

==== Buffalo Sabres (2019–2020) ====
On 6 July 2019, the Buffalo Sabres signed Johansson a two-year, $9 million contract. In his lone season with the club, he recorded 30 points in 60 games.

==== Minnesota Wild (2020–2021) ====
On 16 September 2020, Johansson was traded to the Minnesota Wild in exchange for Eric Staal.

==== Seattle Kraken (2021–2022) ====
On 6 August 2021, Johansson was signed as a free agent to a one-year, $1.5M contract with expansion club, the Seattle Kraken. Johansson began the Kraken's inaugural 2021–22 season, on the injured-reserve. In returning to health, Johansson appeared in 51 regular season games, posting six goals and 23 points.

==== Return to Washington (2022–2023) ====
On 21 March 2022, with the Kraken out of playoff contention, Johansson was traded by the Kraken back to the Washington Capitals in exchange for forward Daniel Sprong, a 2022 fourth-round pick, and a 2023 sixth-round pick. The Kraken retained 50 percent of Johansson's $1.5 million cap hit.

==== Second stint with Minnesota (2023–2026) ====
During the 2022–23 season, on 28 February 2023, Johansson was traded by the Capitals back to the Wild, in exchange for a third-round pick in 2024. On 9 November 2025, during the 2025–26 season, Johansson played his 1,000th NHL game, becoming the 412th player to reach the mark. Johansson ultimately finished the season with 49 points, the second-highest total of his career, and scored four goals in eleven 2026 playoff games.

==== Return to Färjestad (2026–present) ====
Despite his successful 2025–26 season, Johansson opted to return to Sweden for the 2026–27 season, signing a two-year contract to return to his original club Färjestad BK on 5 June 2026.

== International play ==
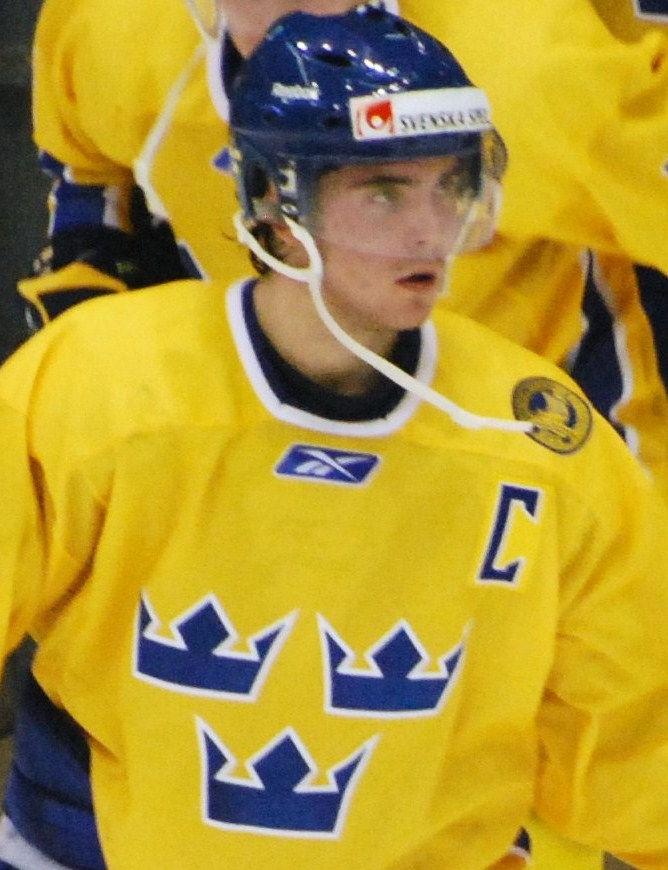

Medal record

Ice hockey

Representing Sweden

Winter Olympics
Silver medal – second place	2014 Sochi	

World Championships
Bronze medal – third place	2024 Czech Republic	
Bronze medal – third place	2025 Sweden/Denmark	

World Junior Championships
Silver medal – second place	2009 Canada	
Bronze medal – third place	2010 Canada	

Johansson first represented Sweden with the nation's under-18 team at the IIHF World U18 Championship, recording four assists and a plus-minus rating of +5 in six games. The Swedes defeated Canada 8–3 in the bronze medal game. Johansson was again selected for Sweden's under-18 team in the IIHF World U18 Championship. In six games, he scored three goals, provided two assists and was a +3 as Sweden advanced to the bronze medal game for the second-straight year, but was beaten out by the United States, 6–3.

Johansson then played for the Swedish junior team at the 2009 World Junior Ice Hockey Championships, scoring two goals and finishing +5 in six games as Sweden reached the tournament final before falling to Canada, 5–1. Johansson served as captain of the Sweden for the 2010 World Junior Ice Hockey Championships, scoring one goal providing five assists and posting a +7 plus-minus rating. In the third period of a game against the United States, Johansson received a game misconduct for elbowing forward Jerry D'Amigo, resulting in an automatic suspension for Sweden's bronze medal game with Switzerland, which Sweden ultimately won.

In 2014, Johansson was selected for the senior Swedish team to participate at the 2014 Winter Olympics in Sochi, where the Tre Kronor finished with a silver medal after falling to Canada in the final, 3–0. He finished with one assist in the tournament off of an Alexander Edler goal against Latvia.

On 27 January 2026, Johansson was named to Sweden's roster for the 2026 Winter Olympics, replacing the injured Leo Carlsson. Johansson appeared in two games at the Olympics, recording no points.

== Career statistics ==
=== Regular season and playoffs ===
			Regular season					Playoffs
Season	Team	League	GP	G	A	Pts	PIM	GP	G	A	Pts	PIM
2005–06	Malmö Redhawks	J18 Allsv	12	0	7	7	0	6	0	4	4	0
2006–07	Färjestad BK	J18 Allsv	12	5	9	14	8	8	7	3	10	2
2007–08	Färjestad BK	J18	12	6	14	20	16	—	—	—	—	—
2007–08	Färjestad BK	J18 Allsv	12	6	12	18	0	8	4	8	12	0
2007–08	Skåre BK	Div.1	19	2	10	12	10	—	—	—	—	—
2007–08	Färjestad BK	SEL	—	—	—	—	—	3	0	0	0	0
2008–09	Färjestad BK	J18 Allsv	2	2	0	2	0	—	—	—	—	—
2008–09	Färjestad BK	SEL	45	5	5	10	10	6	0	0	0	0
2008–09	Skåre BK	Div.1	5	5	5	10	0	—	—	—	—	—
2009–10	Färjestad BK	SEL	42	10	10	20	10	7	0	5	5	2
2010–11	Hershey Bears	AHL	2	0	0	0	0	—	—	—	—	—
2010–11	Washington Capitals	NHL	69	13	14	27	10	9	2	4	6	0
2011–12	Washington Capitals	NHL	80	14	32	46	8	14	1	2	3	0
2012–13	BIK Karlskoga	Allsv	16	8	10	18	8	—	—	—	—	—
2012–13	Washington Capitals	NHL	34	6	16	22	4	7	1	1	2	0
2013–14	Washington Capitals	NHL	80	8	36	44	4	—	—	—	—	—
2014–15	Washington Capitals	NHL	82	20	27	47	10	14	1	3	4	2
2015–16	Washington Capitals	NHL	74	17	29	46	16	12	2	5	7	2
2016–17	Washington Capitals	NHL	82	24	34	58	10	13	2	6	8	2
2017–18	New Jersey Devils	NHL	29	5	9	14	14	3	0	0	0	0
2018–19	New Jersey Devils	NHL	48	12	15	27	8	—	—	—	—	—
2018–19	Boston Bruins	NHL	10	1	2	3	0	22	4	7	11	0
2019–20	Buffalo Sabres	NHL	60	9	21	30	20	—	—	—	—	—
2020–21	Minnesota Wild	NHL	36	6	8	14	4	3	0	0	0	0
2021–22	Seattle Kraken	NHL	51	6	17	23	4	—	—	—	—	—
2021–22	Washington Capitals	NHL	18	3	3	6	0	6	1	1	2	0
2022–23	Washington Capitals	NHL	60	13	15	28	8	—	—	—	—	—
2022–23	Minnesota Wild	NHL	20	6	12	18	0	6	2	0	2	0
2023–24	Minnesota Wild	NHL	78	11	19	30	22	—	—	—	—	—
2024–25	Minnesota Wild	NHL	72	11	23	34	12	5	0	2	2	0
2025–26	Minnesota Wild	NHL	75	15	34	49	12	11	4	0	4	2
SHL totals			87	15	15	30	20	16	0	5	5	2
NHL totals			1,058	200	366	566	166	125	20	31	51	8

=== International ===
Year	Team	Event	Result	GP	G	A	Pts	PIM
2007	Sweden	WJC18	3rd place, bronze medalist(s)	6	0	4	4	0
2007	Sweden	IH18	1st place, gold medalist(s)	4	1	0	1	2
2008	Sweden	WJC18	4th	6	3	2	5	14
2009	Sweden	WJC	2nd place, silver medalist(s)	6	2	0	2	0
2010	Sweden	WJC	3rd place, bronze medalist(s)	5	1	5	6	29
2014	Sweden	OG	2nd place, silver medalist(s)	5	0	1	1	4
2024	Sweden	WC	3rd place, bronze medalist(s)	9	6	6	12	2
2025	Sweden	WC	3rd place, bronze medalist(s)	9	4	4	8	2
2026	Sweden	OG	7th	2	0	0	0	0
Junior totals				27	7	11	18	45
Senior totals				25	10	11	21	8

Awards and achievements
Preceded by John Carlson	Washington Capitals first-round draft pick 2009	Succeeded by Evgeny Kuznetsov
