= Brady Tkachuk =

American ice hockey player (born 1999)

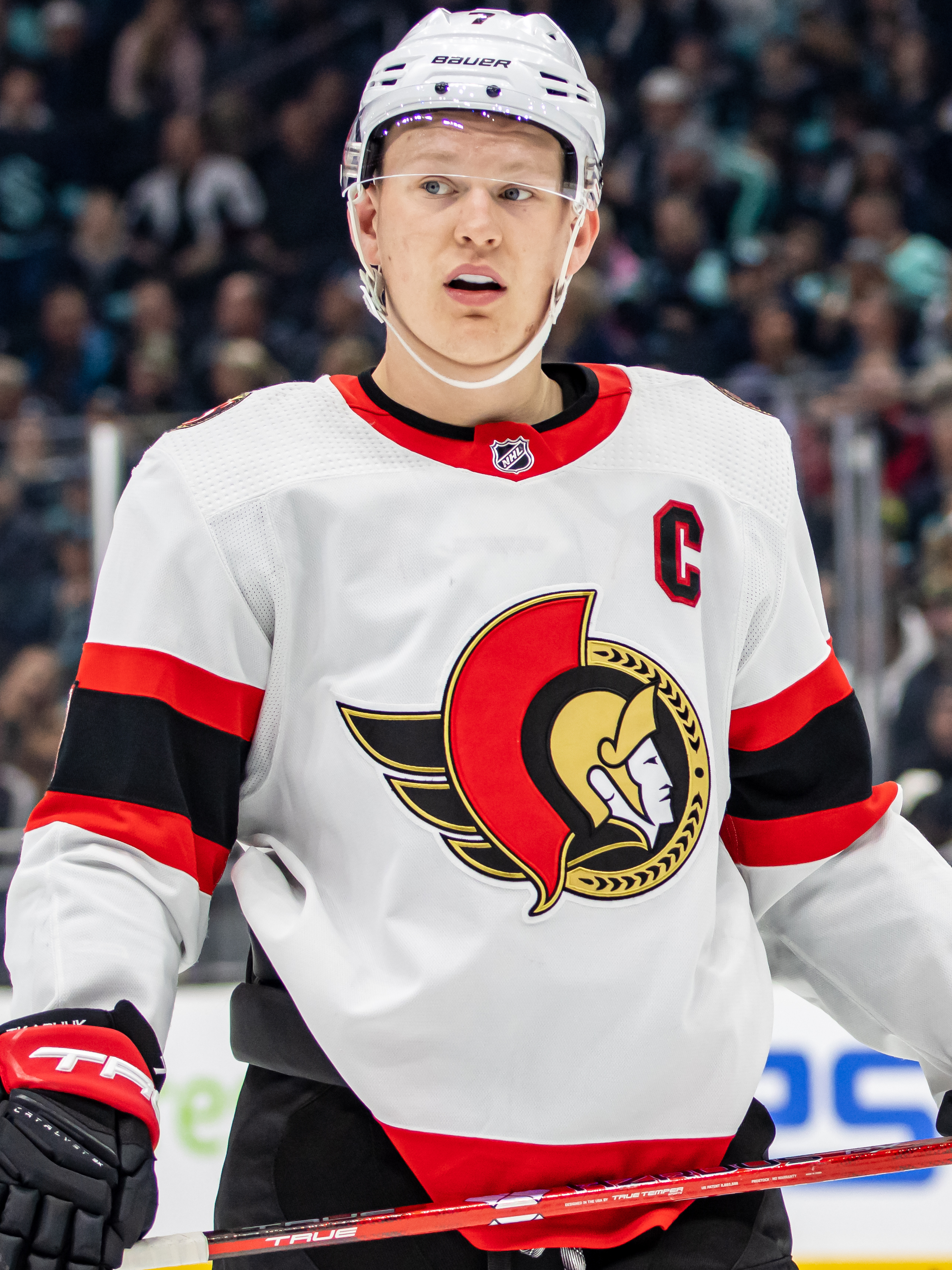
- Tkachuk with the Ottawa Senators in 2023
- Born: September 16, 1999 (age 27) Scottsdale, Arizona, U.S.
- Height: 6 ft 4 in (193 cm)
- Weight: 226 lb (103 kg; 16 st 2 lb)
- Position: Left wing
- Shoots: Left
- NHL team Former teams: Florida Panthers; Ottawa Senators
- National team: United States
- NHL draft: 4th overall, 2018; Ottawa Senators
- Playing career: 2018–present

Braeden Tkachuk (/kəˈtʃʌk/ kə-CHUK; born September 16, 1999) is an American professional ice hockey player who is a left winger for the Florida Panthers of the National Hockey League (NHL). Tkachuk was chosen by the Ottawa Senators as the fourth overall pick in the 2018 NHL entry draft, and played his first eight seasons with the Senators, serving as captain from 2021 to 2026. Prior to turning professional, Tkachuk played one season for the Boston University Terriers, earning All-Hockey East Rookie Team honors. He is the brother of Panthers teammate Matthew Tkachuk and the son of Keith Tkachuk, who played in the NHL for 18 years.

Internationally, Tkachuk has represented the United States at the 2017 World U18 Championships, 2018 World Junior Championships, 2024 World Championship and the 2026 Winter Olympics where he won gold alongside his brother.

== Playing career ==
=== Amateur ===
After playing for the St. Louis AAA Blues U16 he committed to the USA Hockey National Team Development Program (NTDP), joining it for the 2015–16 season in the United States Hockey League (USHL). In 32 games, Tkachuk scored four goals and four assists for eight points. He returned for the 2016–17 season and was named the team's captain, recording 12 goals and 23 points in 24 games.

Tkachuk agreed to play for Boston University (BU) once he had completed two seasons with the NTDP. In his play for the BU Terriers, he recorded four goals and ten assists for 14 points in 19 games as a freshman. Nearing the end of the 2017–18 NCAA season, Tkachuk was selected for the Hockey East Rookie Team after ranking fifth on the team in points. Boston University won the Hockey East tournament championship, defeating Providence College 2–0 on March 17, 2018. This qualified them for the 2018 NCAA tournament, but they were eliminated in the Northeast Regional by the University of Michigan.

=== Professional ===
==== Ottawa Senators (2018–2026) ====
Leading up to the National Hockey League (NHL)'s 2018 entry draft, Tkachuk was ranked second overall among North American skaters by the NHL Central Scouting Bureau. He was eventually selected fourth overall by the Ottawa Senators. Tkachuk signed a three-year, entry-level contract with the Senators on August 13, 2018, forgoing his remaining three years of NCAA eligibility. After participating in the Senators' preseason games, Tkachuk was sidelined for Ottawa's first two regular season games with a groin injury. He eventually made his NHL debut on October 8, in a 6–3 loss to the Boston Bruins. The following game, on October 10, Tkachuk recorded his first NHL goal, and first multi-goal game, and first three-point game, in a 7–4 loss to the Philadelphia Flyers. He became the fastest Tkachuk to record his first NHL goal, surpassing his brother Matthew and father Keith. On October 17, after skating in four games for the Senators, it was announced that Tkachuk had a torn ligament in his leg and was set to be out for a month to recover. Tkachuk eventually returned to the Senators lineup on November 8, for a game against the Vegas Golden Knights. On November 27, he tallied three points, scoring twice and assisting on another, in a 4–3 victory over the Flyers. On March 28, 2019, in a game against the Florida Panthers, Tkachuk tied the Senators' franchise record for most shots on goal in a game with 12. In the same game, he scored his 20th goal of the season to tie Alexandre Daigle for the Senators' record for most goals by a teenage player in a season. Tkachuk finished the 2018–19 season with 22 goals, the second-highest among NHL rookies, behind Elias Pettersson's 28. He was named to the NHL's All-Rookie Team after recording 22 goals and 45 points in 71 games.

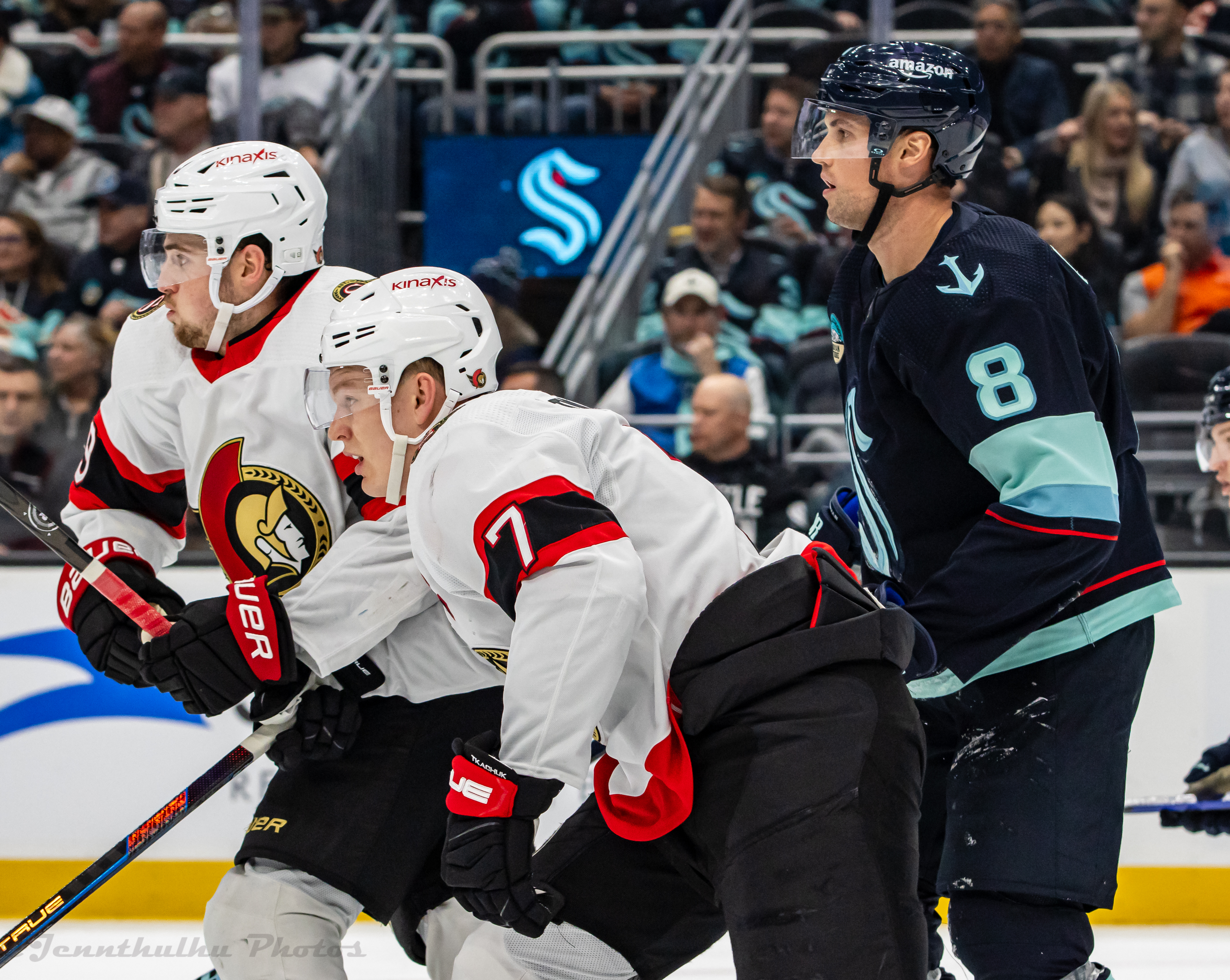
Tkachuk (center) battling for position with Brian Dumoulin of the Seattle Kraken in 2024

In his second season with the Senators in 2019–20, the team which had traded scoring forwards Mark Stone, Matt Duchene, and Ryan Dzingel at the previous season's trading deadline, were building around a new core consisting of Tkachuk and defenseman Thomas Chabot. He was selected to replace the injured Auston Matthews on the Atlantic Division roster for the 2020 NHL All-Star Game on January 22, 2020. In 71 games, he scored 21 goals and 44 points before the remainder of the regular season was canceled on March 12, 2020, due to the COVID-19 pandemic. Tkachuk was named an alternate captain in the pandemic-shortened 2020–21 season. He started the season off with a three-point night in the season opener on January 15, 2021, scoring once and assisting on goals by Chris Tierney and Derek Stepan in a 5–3 win over the Toronto Maple Leafs. Tkachuk finished the season with 17 goals and 36 points in 56 games and established himself as a pest to opposing teams and a leader to his own.

On October 14, 2021, Tkachuk signed a seven-year, $57.5 million contract with the Senators. On November 5, Tkachuk was named as the tenth captain in Senators franchise history. On November 27, Tkachuk was bit by Brendan Lemieux of the Los Angeles Kings during a scrum in the corner. Lemieux was assessed a match penalty and was suspended for five games. On December 4, he marked another three-point game, scoring twice and assisting on a third in a 6–5 overtime win over the Colorado Avalanche. Three games later on December 11, he scored his first NHL hat trick against Brian Elliott in a 4–0 win over the Tampa Bay Lightning. He was selected to replace the injured Drake Batherson as Ottawa's representative at the 2022 NHL All-Star Game. On April 5, 2022, Tkachuk recorded a goal and two assists in a 6–3 win over the Montreal Canadiens. On April 26, he marked three assists in a 5–4 overtime win over the New Jersey Devils. In 79 games, he scored 30 goals and 67 points. However, the Senators failed to make the playoffs for the third consecutive season.

At the outset of the 2022–23 season, Tkachuk was expected to play on the first line with Josh Norris and Batherson. On October 18, he scored once and added two assists in a 7–5 victory over the Bruins. Shortly after the season began, Norris suffered a season-ending injury on October 22. This forced the Senators to shuffle their forwards, placing Tkachuk on a line with Tim Stützle. On November 3, he tallied three assists in a 5–4 loss to the Golden Knights. He repeated the feat on November 12, assisting on goals by Chabot, Stützle, and Alex DeBrincat in a 4–1 win over the Flyers. On December 2, in Tkachuk's 300th NHL game, the Senators captain recorded a Gordie Howe hat trick, scoring his 100th and 101st career goals, with the 101st being the game winner in overtime and an assist in a 3–2 overtime win over the New York Rangers. Tkachuk was named to the 2023 NHL All-Star Game, representing Ottawa. He played alongside his brother, Matthew, on the Atlantic Division team. On February 27, 2023, in a 6–2 win over the Detroit Red Wings, Tkachuk skated over to the Red Wings' bench at the end of the second period and challenged the entire Red Wings team. Tkachuk scored a goal in the win, which helped move the Senators closer to a possible playoff spot in the Eastern Conference. Towards the end of the season, as the Senators sought to get one of the last playoff spots in the conference, on March 27, Tkachuk registered a goal and an assist in a 5–2 win over the Florida Panthers, who were also vying for a playoff spot. However, the Senators were eliminated from playoff contention on April 7, in a 7–2 loss to the Panthers. In 82 games, he scored 35 goals and 83 points.

Tkachuk picked up where he left off, tallying three points (two goals, one assist) in the third game of the 2023–24 season, a 5–2 victory over the Lightning on October 15. On November 4, he repeated the act against the Lightning in a 6–4 loss. The Senators struggled early on which cost head coach D. J. Smith his job in December. He was replaced by Jacques Martin on an interim basis. On December 23, under his new head coach, he scored once and assisted on goals by Norris and Erik Brännström in a 5–4 win over the Pittsburgh Penguins. He was selected to represent Ottawa at the 2024 NHL All-Star Game. On January 16, 2024, he recorded three assists on goals by Ridly Greig and Jake Sanderson in a 7–4 loss to the Avalanche. He tallied his second career hat trick on February 13 in a 6–3 victory over the Columbus Blue Jackets. Later that month on February 26, he scored a goal and assisted on the Senators' other goals by Batherson and Shane Pinto in a three-point effort against the Washington Capitals in a 6–3 loss. On March 16, he marked his second hat trick of the season and third of his career in a 4–3 overtime win over the New York Islanders. On April 13, he scored two goals and added an assist in a 5–4 shootout win over the Canadiens. In 81 games, he registered 37 goals and 74 points. Despite the coaching change, the Senators could not overcome their poor start to the season and finished out of the playoffs again. Tkachuk described the season as "this is probably the most difficult year I've had, to date, mentally," and that he was "sick and tired of losing. I don't want to be going home in April anymore. It's frustrating. I'm disappointed. At the end of the day, just disappointed."

Under new head coach Travis Green, he opened up the 2024–25 season with two three-point performances within the first month. He registered three assists on October 14 in an 8–7 overtime victory over the Kings, and then notched one goal and two assists on October 27 in a 5–4 loss to the Avalanche. In January 2025 he went on an 11-game scoreless streak, breaking it in a 3–1 victory over the Utah Hockey Club on January 26. In 72 appearances he scored 29 goals and 55 points. The Senators qualified for the playoffs for the first time in Tkachuk's career, facing the Maple Leafs in the opening round. He made his playoff debut on April 20 in game one of the series. He scored his first NHL playoff goal in game two of the series, a 3–2 loss. Tkachuk stated "We'll be back" after the team's game four win and led the charge in game five, scoring once and assisted twice in a 4–0 win to extend the series to a sixth game. The Senators were eliminated in six games in their best-of-seven series. In the six games, Tkachuk tallied the four goals and seven points.

In the 2025–26 season opening 5–4 victory over the Lightning on October 15, Tkachuk recorded three assists. However, he suffered an injury to his thumb in the third game of the season that required surgery to repair, sidelining him for up to eight weeks. He returned on November 28 against the St. Louis Blues after missing 21 games. He registered an assist in the 4–3 loss to St. Louis. On January 14, he registered his first four-point night, scoring once and assisting on goals by Batherson, Stützle, and Dylan Cozens in an 8–4 victory over the New York Rangers. Later that month he recorded three assists on two goals by Cozens and another by Jordan Spence in a 7–1 win over the Golden Knights. He tallied another three-point game on January 31, scoring once and adding two assists in a 4–1 win over the Devils. However, he faced criticism from the fanbase on his dedication to the team. The commentary surrounding Tkachuk, his personal podcast that he had created with his brother Matthew, and comments made by his father increased following Team USA won Olympic gold at the 2026 Winter Olympics. The negative attention grew to bother his teammates. Tkachuk was fined for unsportsmanlike conduct toward an opponent, in the form of a minor penalty of slashing, while sitting on the bench during a game against the Buffalo Sabres on April 2, 2026. He recorded another four-point game on April 7, assisting on goals by Fabian Zetterlund, Sanderson, and Spence in a 6–2 victory over the Lightning. In 60 games he marked 22 goals and 59 points as the Senators made the playoffs for the second consecutive season. They were swept in the first round by the Carolina Hurricanes in four games. Tkachuk went scoreless in the series.

==== Florida Panthers (2026–present) ====
Brady Tkachuk with the Florida Panthers in November 2026

In May 2026, Ottawa Senators general manager Steve Staios visited Tkachuk in New Jersey and had a meeting with him about his future with the team. Tkachuk indicated that he would not re-sign with Ottawa at the end of his existing contract. Staios asked Tkachuk, who had a no-move clause in his contract and could block a trade to any team, for a list of teams he would accept a trade to. Tkachuk's agent, Craig Oster, provided Staios with a list of four teams; the Carolina Hurricanes, Florida Panthers, Minnesota Wild, and Vegas Golden Knights. Ultimately, on June 21, 2026, Tkachuk was traded to the Florida Panthers, joining his brother Matthew, in exchange for the ninth and 25th overall picks in the 2026 NHL entry draft, a conditional 2029 first-round pick, and a 2027 second-round pick.

Following his trade multiple Ottawa sports teams including the Ottawa Titans and Senators offered for fans to trade in Tkachuk's jersey for either a different jersey from that team or a discount on future purchases. Multiple fans took the teams up on the offers, sold or destroyed their jerseys, expressing their anger over the trade following Tkachuk's April 2026 statement that he was committed to the team and tired of the questions about potential interest in playing for an American NHL team.

He made his Panthers debut in the 2026–27 season opening 1–0 win against the Carolina Hurricanes. He recorded his first point with the Panthers on October 12, assisting on Sam Reinhart's second goal in a 5–3 loss to the Sabres. On October 13 and 15, Tkachuk became just the third player in NHL history to score a natural hat trick (three consecutive goals without any player from either team scoring) in back-to-back games. Previously the feat had been achieved by the Vancouver Canucks' Petri Skriko in 1986, and the Ottawa Senators' Cy Denneny in 1923. All three goals of the October 13 hat trick were assisted by Tkachuk's brother Matthew, marking the ninth time in NHL history that feat occurred. Tkachuk made his return to Ottawa and played his first game against the team since the trade on October 21, 2026, scoring the lone goal in a 5–1 loss to the Senators. Throughout the game, Senators fans routinely booed Tkachuk, with many throwing jerseys on the ice.

== International play ==
Medal record

Men's ice hockey

Representing the United States

Winter Olympics
Gold medal – first place	2026 Milano Cortina	

4 Nations Face-Off
Runner-up	2025 Canada/United States	

World Junior Championships
Bronze medal – third place	2018 United States	

World U18 Championships
Gold medal – first place	2017 Slovakia	

Tkachuk was the captain of the gold-winning United States under-18 national team at the 2017 World U18 Championships.

He was selected to the United States junior team for the 2018 World Junior Championships, winning bronze. He finished third on the team with points marking three goals and nine points in seven games.

Tkachuk captained the United States senior team in the 2024 World Championship. Tkachuk added seven goals and 13 points in eight games in the tournament. They made it to the quarterfinals where they eliminated by Czechia 1–0, placing fifth. He was selected to represent his country in 2025 at the 4 Nations Face-Off. In the round-robin portion of the tournament, Tkachuk, his brother Matthew, and J. T. Miller all got into fights with Canadian players just after play started. Team USA won that game. Playing on the second line with his brother Matthew and Jack Eichel, the team faced Canada in the final. Ultimately Team USA lost the final against Canada finishing as runners-up in the tournament. In three games in the series, he scored three goals.

On June 16, 2025, he was one of six players named to United States' preliminary roster for the 2026 Winter Olympics, in which he would defeat Team Canada in the final to win gold alongside his brother. In five games, he added two goals and five points. Amid backlash regarding the inclusion of FBI director Kash Patel and laughing to President Trump's comments of being impeached if he did not invite the women's team, Tkachuk attended the State of the Union and toured the White House with a majority of his team. During the call, Tkachuk reportedly could be heard yelling, "Close the northern border." He has denied those claims. He also spoke out against Trump using an AI image of Tkachuk and a replica of his voice in a video posted to the White House TikTok account shortly after the game. Tkachuk specifically called out the video, which states, "They booed our national anthem, so I had to come out and teach those maple syrup eating [sic] fuckers a lesson," claiming it was something he would never say. Despite the controversy and playing for a Canadian NHL team, he was applauded at the first Senators home game after the Olympics.

== Personal life ==
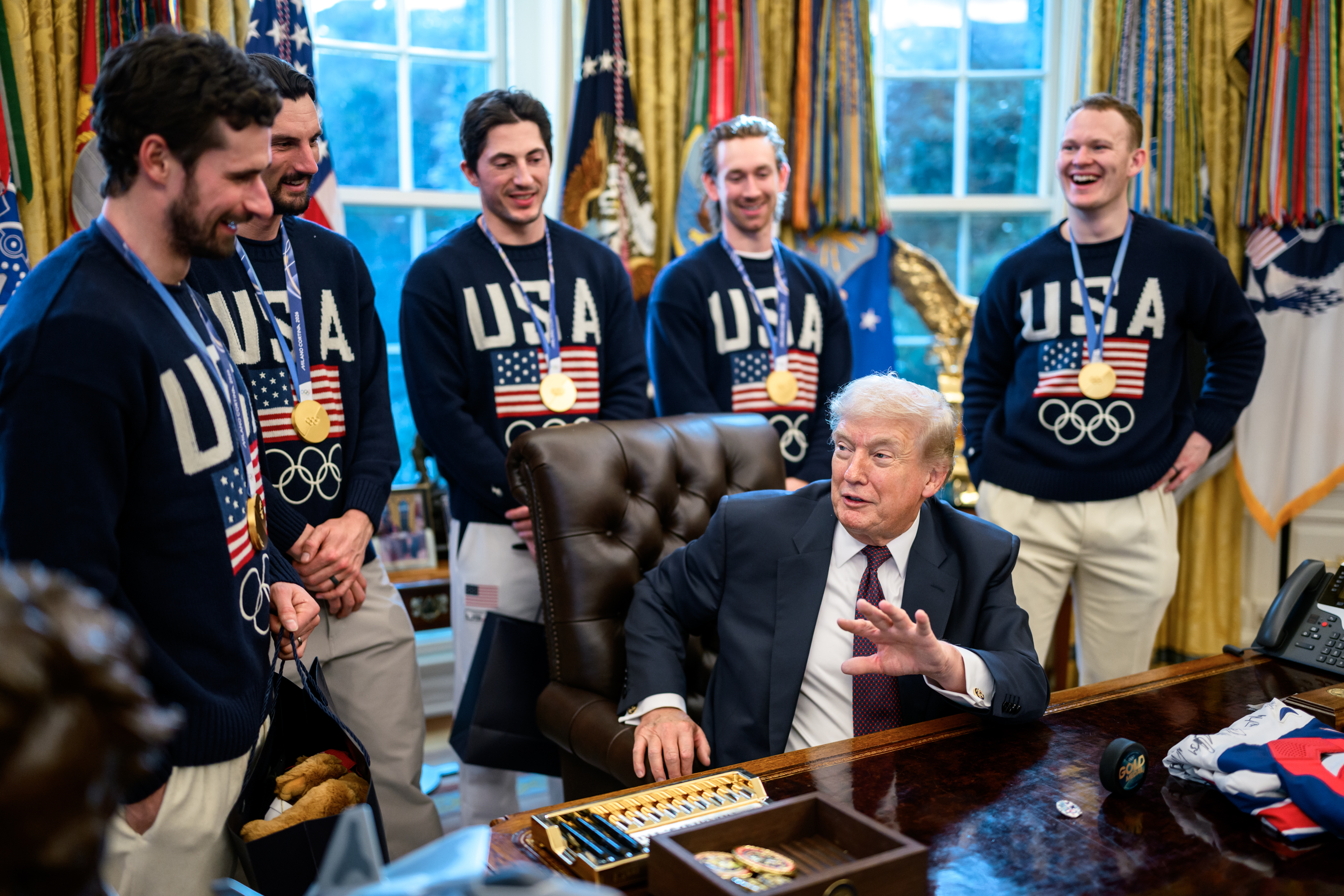
Tkachuk with some of his teammates speaking with President Trump during their visit to the White House in February 2026

Tkachuk's father is an American former NHL player Keith Tkachuk, and his mother is Canadian Chantal Oster from Winnipeg, who married in 1997. He was born in Scottsdale, Arizona, during his father's tenure with the Phoenix Coyotes. He was raised in the St. Louis suburb of Creve Coeur, Missouri, after his father's 2001 trade to the St. Louis Blues. His older brother, Matthew, is an alternate captain for the Florida Panthers, and his younger sister, Taryn, played field hockey for the University of Virginia. Both Tkachuk brothers attended the former Oak Hill School at Villa Duchesne and Chaminade College Preparatory School.

Tkachuk is of Ukrainian descent on both his maternal and paternal sides; the surname Tkachuk translates to weaver in Ukrainian. He is also of Irish ancestry on his paternal side.

The Tkachuk family has been referred to as one branch of "a giant hockey family tree" and Tkachuk is related to several other current and former NHL players and league industry members through both his father's family, originally from Medford, Massachusetts, and his mother's family, of Winnipeg, Manitoba. Tkachuk is a second cousin of Tom Fitzgerald, former NHL player and former general manager of the New Jersey Devils, as well as a second cousin once-removed to Casey Fitzgerald and Casey's brother, Ryan, who plays in the American Hockey League (AHL). He is also a cousin of NHL player Kevin Hayes and his brother, Jimmy Hayes. Tkachuk's maternal uncle is NHL player agent Craig Oster, who represents numerous NHL players, including Erik Karlsson, Mark Stone, and Evgeny Kuznetsov, as well as both Tkachuk and his brother.

Tkachuk married his longtime girlfriend Emma Farinacci in July 2023. Farinacci is the sister of professional hockey player John Farinacci. They met in Boston while Tkachuk was at Boston University, where they were both students, and married in 2023. They relocated to Ottawa when Tkachuk became a Senator. The couple launched "Tkachuk's Captains", a program to support underprivileged children in March 2023. The couple welcomed their first child, a son, on September 16, 2024 (sharing his birthday). and their second child, a daughter was born on April 26, 2026.

Tkachuk and brother Matthew launched a joint podcast called "Wingmen" which hosts guests and speak about topics. An episode with Tkachuk's father Keith, reportedly drew concerns and frustrations within the Senators locker room after Keith Tkachuk talked negatively about the team.

== Career statistics ==
=== Regular season and playoffs ===
			Regular season					Playoffs
Season	Team	League	GP	G	A	Pts	PIM	GP	G	A	Pts	PIM
2015–16	US NTDP Juniors	USHL	32	4	4	8	36	—	—	—	—	—
2015–16	US NTDP U17	USDP	55	9	16	25	56	—	—	—	—	—
2016–17	US NTDP Juniors	USHL	24	12	11	23	73	—	—	—	—	—
2016–17	US NTDP U18	USDP	61	25	29	54	129	—	—	—	—	—
2017–18	Boston University	HE	40	8	23	31	61	—	—	—	—	—
2018–19	Ottawa Senators	NHL	71	22	23	45	75	—	—	—	—	—
2019–20	Ottawa Senators	NHL	71	21	23	44	106	—	—	—	—	—
2020–21	Ottawa Senators	NHL	56	17	19	36	69	—	—	—	—	—
2021–22	Ottawa Senators	NHL	79	30	37	67	117	—	—	—	—	—
2022–23	Ottawa Senators	NHL	82	35	48	83	126	—	—	—	—	—
2023–24	Ottawa Senators	NHL	81	37	37	74	134	—	—	—	—	—
2024–25	Ottawa Senators	NHL	72	29	26	55	123	6	4	3	7	6
2025–26	Ottawa Senators	NHL	60	22	37	59	71	4	0	0	0	13
NHL totals			572	213	250	463	821	10	4	3	7	19

=== International ===
Year	Team	Event	Result	GP	G	A	Pts	PIM
2015	United States	U17	6th	5	2	3	5	4
2017	United States	WJC18	1st place, gold medalist(s)	7	1	6	7	12
2018	United States	WJC	3rd place, bronze medalist(s)	7	3	6	9	2
2024	United States	WC	5th	8	7	6	13	4
2025	United States	4NF	2nd	4	3	0	3	5
2026	United States	OG	1st place, gold medalist(s)	6	3	2	5	12
Junior totals				19	6	15	21	18
Senior totals				18	13	8	21	21

== Awards and honors ==
Award	Year	Ref
College
All-Hockey East Rookie Team	2018	
NHL
NHL All-Rookie Team	2019	
NHL All-Star Game	2020, 2022, 2023, 2024	

Awards and achievements
Preceded by Shane Bowers	Ottawa Senators first-round draft pick 2018	Succeeded by Jacob Bernard-Docker
Sporting positions
Preceded by Erik Karlsson	Ottawa Senators captain 2021–2026	Succeeded by Thomas Chabot
