= Erik Karlsson =

Swedish ice hockey player (born 1990)

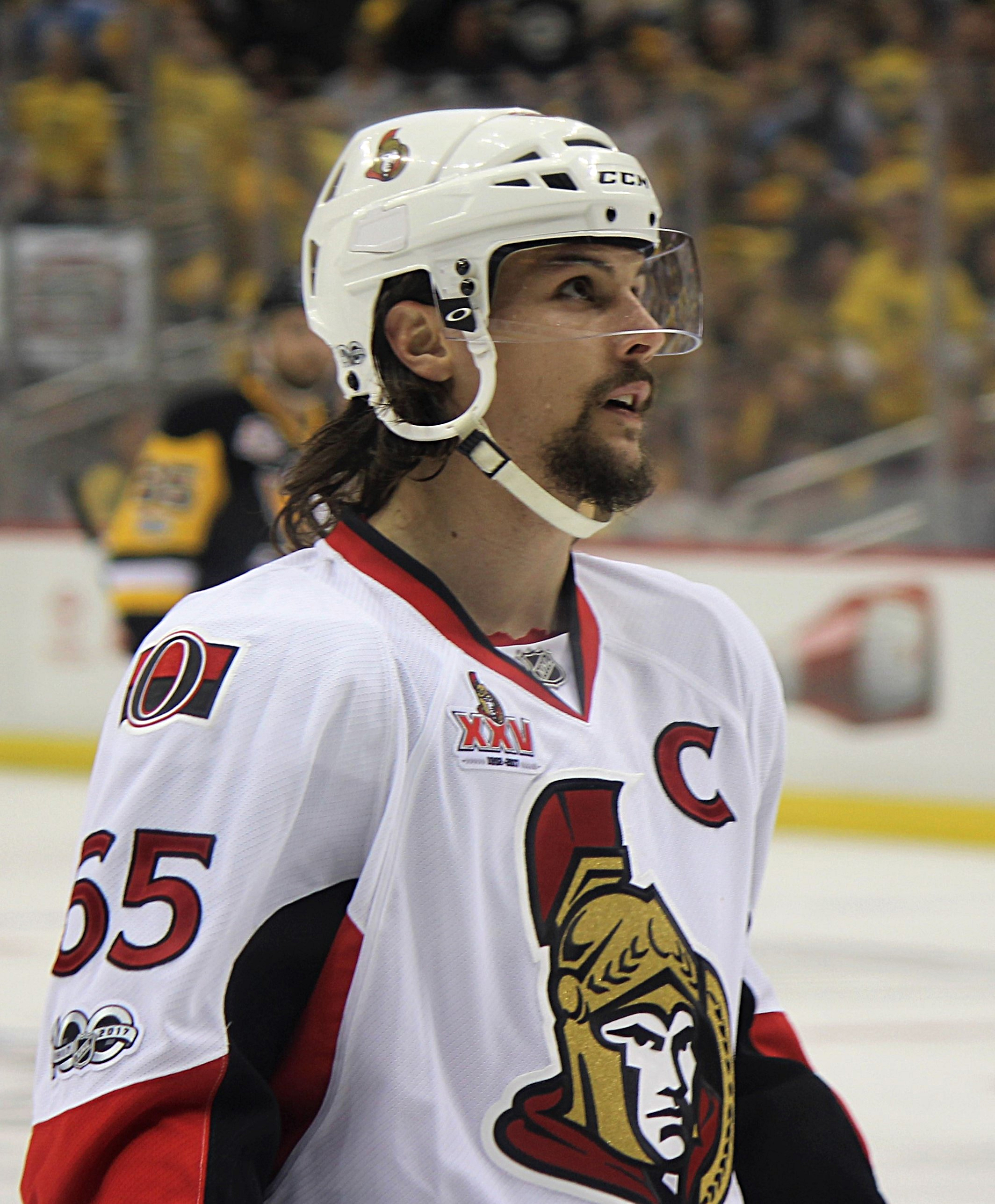
- Karlsson with the Ottawa Senators in May 2017
- Born: 31 May 1990 (age 36) Landsbro, Sweden
- Height: 6 ft 0 in (183 cm)
- Weight: 185 lb (84 kg; 13 st 3 lb)
- Position: Defence
- Shoots: Right
- NHL team Former teams: Pittsburgh Penguins; Frölunda HC; Ottawa Senators; Jokerit; San Jose Sharks
- National team: Sweden
- NHL draft: 15th overall, 2008; Ottawa Senators
- Playing career: 2008–present

Erik Sven Gunnar Karlsson (pronounced [ˈêːrɪk ˈkɑ̌ːɭsɔn]; born 31 May 1990) is a Swedish professional ice hockey player who is a defenceman for the Pittsburgh Penguins of the National Hockey League (NHL). Karlsson was drafted in the first round, 15th overall, by the Ottawa Senators at the 2008 NHL entry draft, with whom he spent his first nine NHL seasons; he has also played for the San Jose Sharks. Widely regarded as one of the greatest defensemen of his generation, Karlsson is a three-time winner of the James Norris Memorial Trophy as the NHL's best defenceman, winning the award in 2012, 2015, and 2023.

== Playing career ==
=== Sweden ===
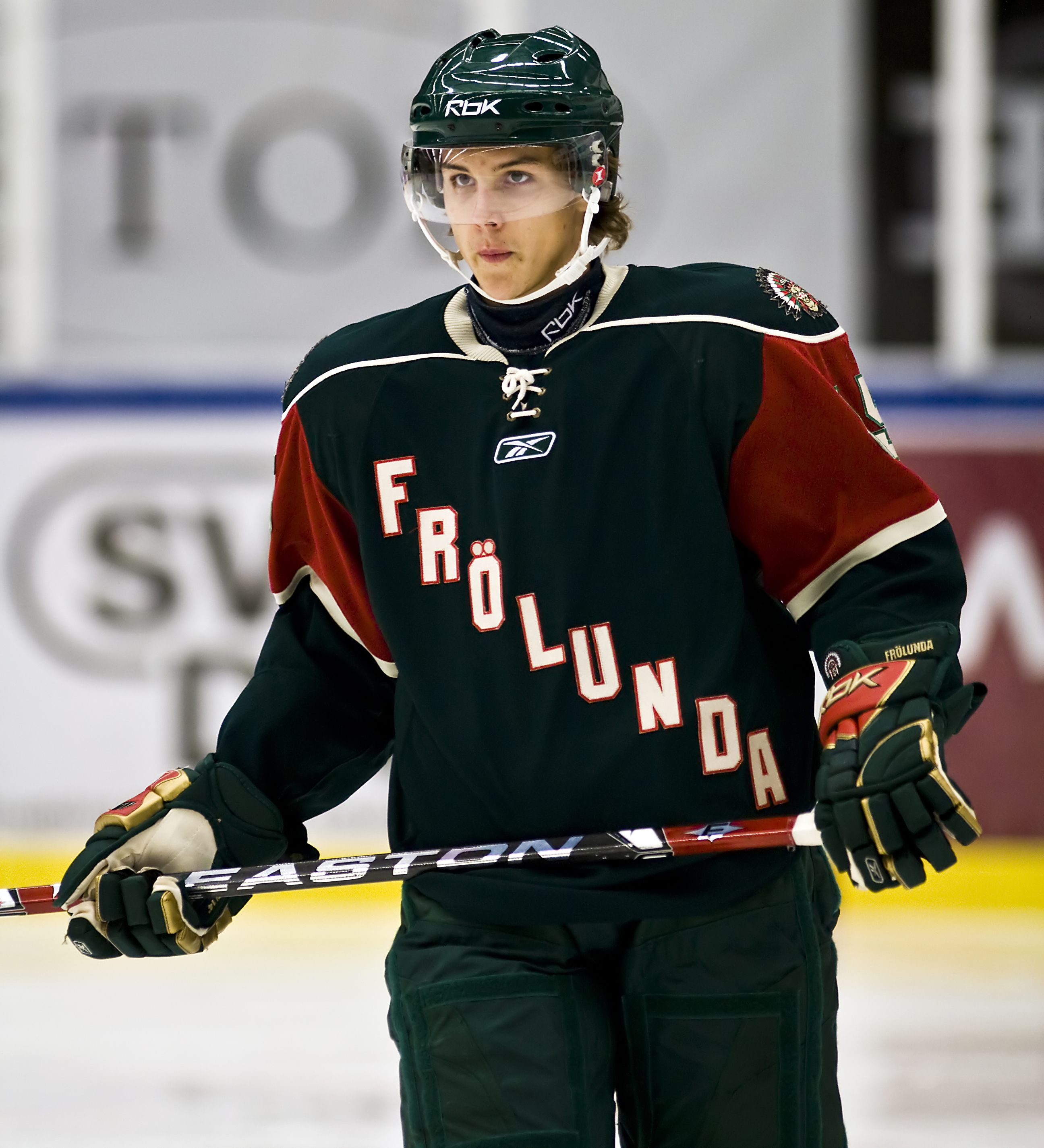
Karlsson with Frölunda HC in August 2008.

Karlsson made his Elitserien debut for Frölunda HC on 1 March 2008, recording 8:48 of ice time during a sold out home game in Scandinavium against league leaders HV71. Karlsson scored the game-winning goal, assisted by Tomi Kallio and Magnus Kahnberg, with a slap shot in overtime during a man advantage. The win secured a playoff berth for Frölunda with three games remaining in the regular season.

Karlsson finished the season with Frölunda's J20 team playing in the J20 SuperElit playoffs, where Frölunda took home the Anton Cup when they won, two games to one, against Brynäs IF's J20 team in the Swedish Junior Ice Hockey Championship final.

Prior to the 2008 NHL entry draft, Karlsson was ranked fourth among European skaters by the NHL's Central Scouting Service. He was ultimately drafted 15th overall by the Ottawa Senators in front of their hometown fans at Scotiabank Place in Ottawa. The selection was made by Ottawa's captain Daniel Alfredsson, a native of Gothenburg, who played for Frölunda before entering the NHL. Then-Ottawa general manager Bryan Murray traded Ottawa's first-round pick, 18th overall, and their third-round pick in 2009 to the Nashville Predators in exchange for the Predators' first-round pick, 15th overall, to ensure that no other team would select Karlsson before them.

A few weeks before the 2008–09 Elitserien season premiere, Frölunda announced that Karlsson was brought up to the senior team as a regular roster player.

=== Ottawa Senators (2009–2018) ===
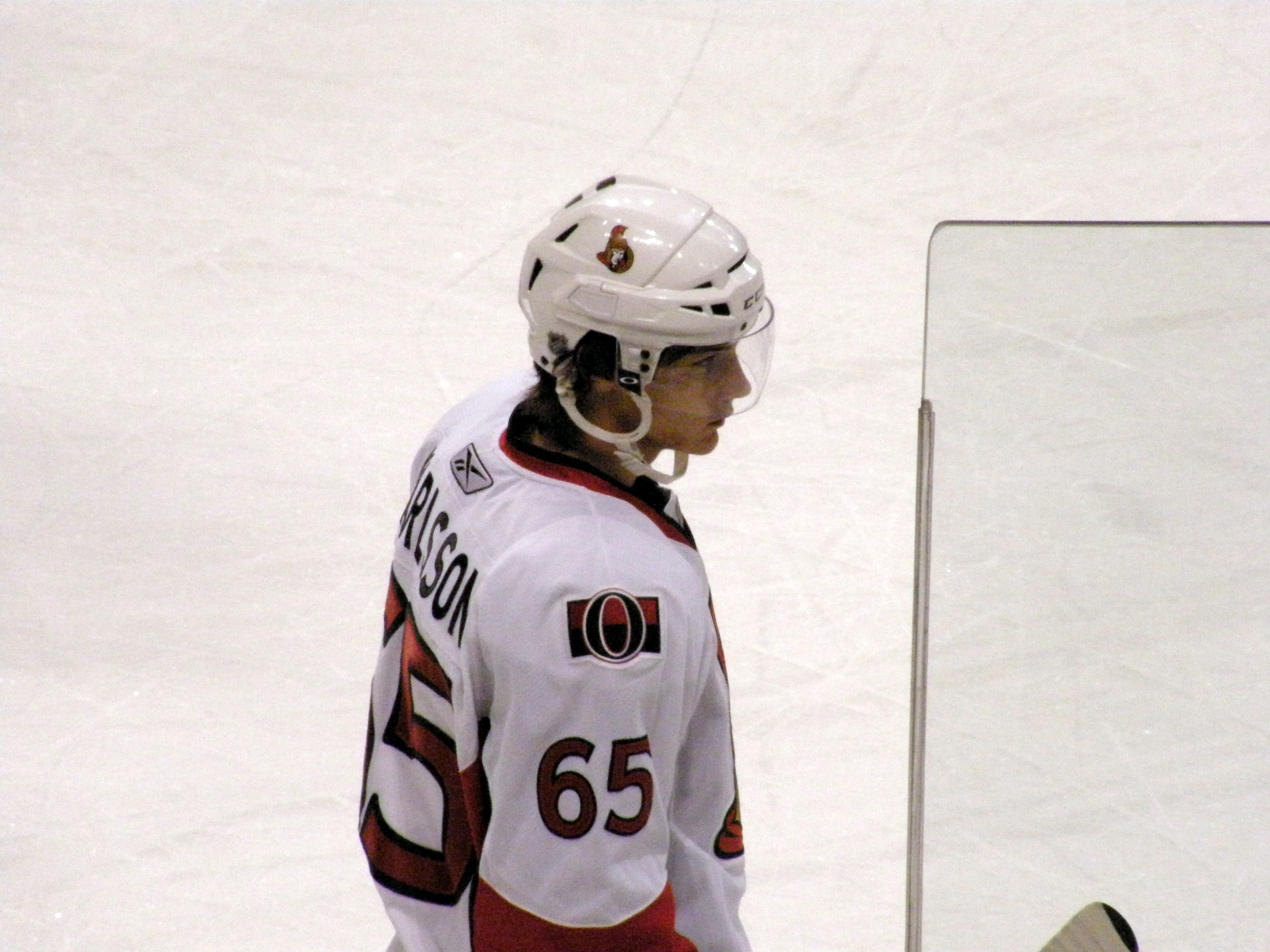
Karlsson with the Ottawa Senators in November 2009

In September 2009, Karlsson attended the Senators' training camp ahead of the 2009–10 season. On 29 September 2009, the Senators announced that Karlsson had made the team's NHL roster. Karlsson made his NHL debut on 3 October, against the New York Rangers, and recorded his first NHL point, an assist. After struggling in nine regular season games with Ottawa, he was assigned to the team's American Hockey League (AHL) affiliate, the Binghamton Senators. On 27 November 2009, exactly one month after being sent down, Karlsson was recalled from Binghamton. He would score his first NHL goal against the Minnesota Wild's Niklas Bäckström in a 4–1 win for Ottawa on 19 December 2009, and would remain in the NHL for the remainder of the season and play in all of Ottawa's 2010 Stanley Cup playoff games.

Karlsson was selected to participate in the 2011 NHL All-Star Game, set for 30 January 2011, at the RBC Center in Raleigh, North Carolina, having recorded 25 points in 41 games.

The 2011–12 season saw Karlsson continue his development. On 16 December 2011, with his third assist of the night, Karlsson registered his 100th regular-season NHL point (in 168 games) in a game against the rival Pittsburgh Penguins. Karlsson was the NHL's leading vote-getter in All-Star voting, receiving 939,951 fan votes and becoming one of four Senators players selected to partake in the 2012 NHL All-Star Game. Karlsson finished the season as the leading scorer among NHL defencemen, leading second-place Dustin Byfuglien and Brian Campbell by 25 points. Karlsson was being mentioned as a James Norris Memorial Trophy candidate, if not the favourite for the award. During the season he set a new Senators franchise record for points in a season by a defenceman (previously held by Norm Maciver) with 78.

On 19 June 2012, Karlsson signed a reported seven-year, $45.5 million contract with the Senators. The following day, Karlsson was announced as the winner of the James Norris Trophy as the NHL's best defenceman, beating Zdeno Chára of the Boston Bruins and Shea Weber of the Nashville Predators. He became the second Swede after seven-time winner Nicklas Lidström to win the award, joining the ranks of Hall of Famers Bobby Orr and Denis Potvin as the only players to win the award under age 23.

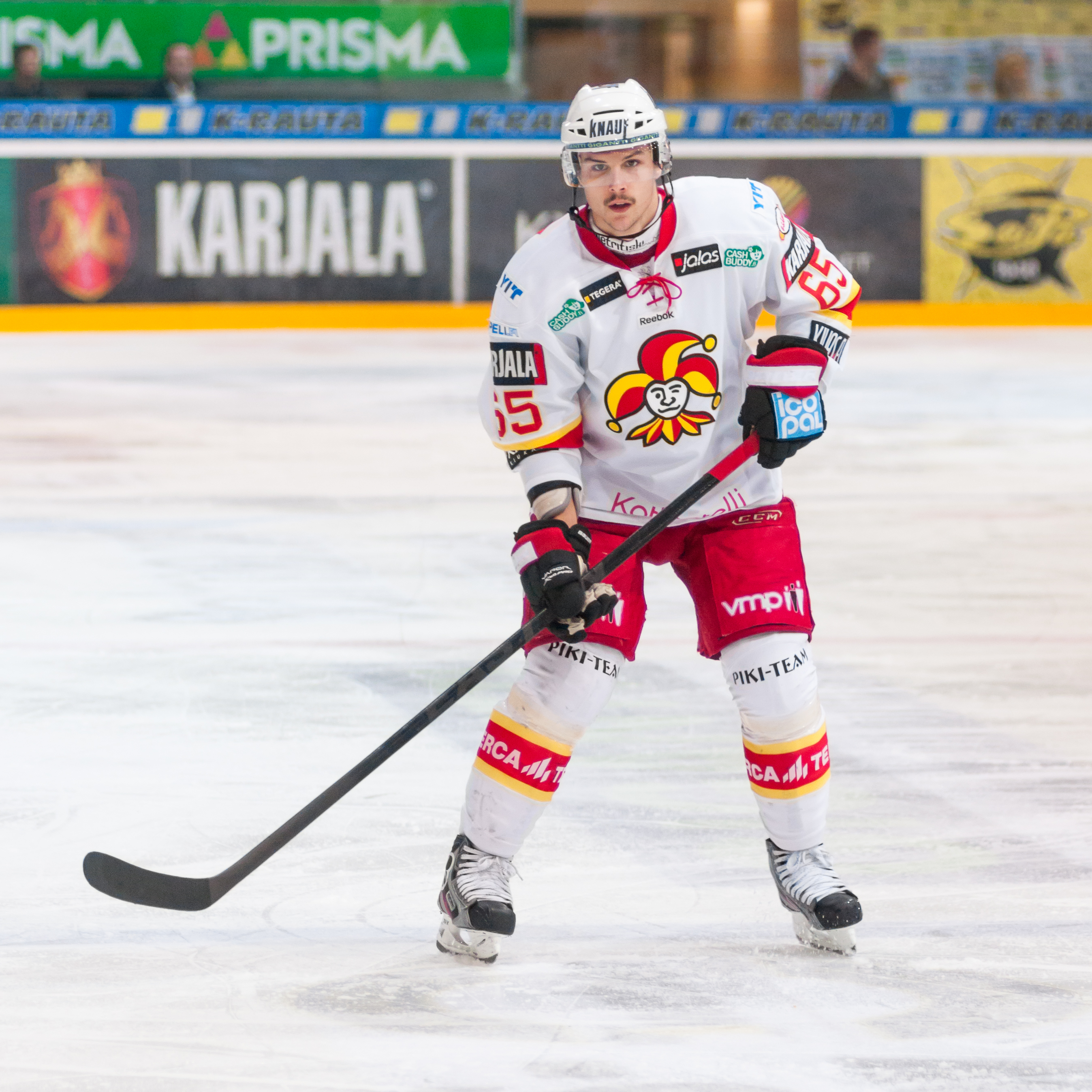
Karlsson with Jokerit in November 2012 during the 2012–13 NHL lockout

During the 2012–13 NHL lockout, Karlsson signed with Jokerit of the Finnish SM-liiga. He received a one-game suspension for allegedly throwing his stick at a referee following a game on 8 December 2012. He finished his stint in Jokerit with 9 goals and 25 assists (34 points) in 30 games, leading all defencemen in scoring. Once the lockout ended and the season commenced in January 2013, Karlsson promptly recorded a goal and two assists as Ottawa defeated the Winnipeg Jets 4–1 in their season opener. On 13 February 2013, Karlsson's Achilles tendon was lacerated when Pittsburgh Penguins forward Matt Cooke had his skate land on the back of Karlsson's left leg, requiring surgery and taking him out of Ottawa's lineup indefinitely. Cooke had been suspended several times previously for much-criticized incidents resulting in injury to opposing players, but was not suspended for this incident. At the time of the injury, Karlsson led all NHL defencemen with six goals. Though initial estimates had him out of the lineup for four-to-six months, Karlsson returned to the Ottawa lineup against the Washington Capitals on 25 April 2013, ten weeks to the day after the injury occurred. The Senators made the 2013 Stanley Cup playoffs but were eliminated by Pittsburgh in the Eastern Conference semifinals, with Karlsson registering one goal and seven assists in ten games.

Karlsson appeared in all 82 games during the 2013–14 season and finished the season with 20 goals, 54 assists and 74 points, resulting in Karlsson being the first defenceman since Brian Leetch in 2000–01 to have at least 20 goals and 50 assists in the same season. He passed Steve Duchesne for franchise record for most goals in a season by a defenceman with 20. However, the Senators would fail to qualify for the 2014 playoffs.

On 2 October 2014, the Senators organization announced that Karlsson would serve as the ninth captain in the team's modern history, replacing the recently traded Jason Spezza. In his first season as team captain, Karlsson led all NHL defencemen in points for the third time in four seasons, including a career-high 21 goals. He also played in all 82 of Ottawa's games for a consecutive season and ranked third in the NHL in total ice time (2,234:55) and average ice time (27:15) to carry the Senators to a 23–4–4 record on the way to an unlikely playoff spot. On 24 June 2015, it was announced Karlsson won his second Norris Trophy, beating out fellow nominees Drew Doughty and P. K. Subban.

Karlsson appeared in all 82 games for the third-straight season during the 2015–16 season and led the league in assists with a career high 66 assists and set a career high in points (82), finishing fourth in the league in scoring alongside San Jose Sharks forward Joe Thornton. With his 81st point, Karlsson broke the record for most points in a single season by a Swedish defenceman, which was previously set by Nicklas Lidström during the 2005–06 season. Karlsson was also the first defenceman since Paul Coffey in the 1985–86 season to finish in the top five in scoring and the first since Bobby Orr in the 1974–75 season to lead the league in assists. Karlsson's performance earned him his third Norris Trophy nomination, though Drew Doughty won the trophy with Karlsson finishing in second place in vote totals.

During the 2016–17 season, Karlsson set a Senators record on 4 March 2017, when he appeared in his 312th consecutive game, breaking the previous set by defenceman Chris Phillips. However, he would miss his first game in almost four years in late March 2017 after sustaining an injury from blocking a shot during a game against the Philadelphia Flyers, ending his consecutive game streak at 324 games. Karlsson finished the regular season in third place among defencemen in points and second place among defencemen in assists and blocked shots, earning him his fourth Norris Trophy nomination. Karlsson would finish second in voting, with the award going to Brent Burns of the San Jose Sharks. Karlsson's performance continued into the 2017 playoffs, helping the Senators reach the conference finals, the first time the team had done so since 2007. Although the Senators would be eliminated by the Pittsburgh Penguins in seven games losing the deciding seventh game in double overtime, one win and goal short of reaching the 2017 Stanley Cup Final, Karlsson was praised for his performance during the Senators' playoff run and how he continued playing despite suffering two hairline fractures in his left heel. Karlsson would also set a playoff team record for most assists and points for a defenceman in the playoffs, breaking the previous record set by Wade Redden in the 2006 playoffs (eight assists, 10 points). And despite being eliminated in the conference finals, Karlsson received a Conn Smythe Trophy vote without playing a game in the Stanley Cup Final.

Shortly after the Senators were eliminated from the playoffs, Karlsson had surgery to repair torn tendons in his left foot, resulting in him missing the beginning of the 2017–18 season. Karlsson's productivity slightly dwindled in this season, finishing the season with 9 goals, 53 assists and 62 points in 71 games, partly due to coping with injuries and the loss of his child towards the end of the season. Despite his lower-than-average performance, Karlsson moved into third place on the franchise's all-time points list (with 492 points) on 8 February 2018 after a 4–3 win over the Nashville Predators. The Senators also struggled during the season, finishing the season in 30th place in the league. In the midst of a rebuild, the Senators attempted to trade Karlsson before the NHL trade deadline, as his seven-year contract was ending in 2019 and the organization was uncertain about re-signing him, though a deal could not be reached before the deadline. However, the day after the deadline, Karlsson expressed his interest in staying in Ottawa and said that he never requested a trade.

=== San Jose Sharks (2018–2023) ===
On 13 September 2018, Karlsson (along with Francis Perron) was traded to the San Jose Sharks in exchange for Chris Tierney, Dylan DeMelo, Josh Norris, Rūdolfs Balcers, the Sharks' 2020 first-round pick, a 2019 second-round pick and a conditional 2021 second-round pick. He scored his first goal with the Sharks on 18 November in a 4–0 win over the St. Louis Blues. After a slow start to the 2018–19 season, Karlsson became the fifth defenceman in league history to have at least one assist in 14 consecutive games following a 7–2 victory over the Edmonton Oilers on 8 January 2019. On 23 December, Karlsson was suspended for the first time in his career for two games for an illegal check to the head of Los Angeles Kings player Austin Wagner. A groin injury resulted in Karlsson missing many games near the end of the season before returning for the last game of the season against the Colorado Avalanche. He would finish the season with 45 points in 53 games, his lowest point tally since the 2012–13 season. Karlsson assisted San Jose in reaching the Western Conference finals during the 2019 playoffs, though he sustained another groin injury in a game against the St. Louis Blues, resulting in him missing San Jose's final game of the playoffs when the team lost 5–1 in game 6. He would finish the playoffs with 16 points in 19 games. On 31 May, he underwent groin surgery. During the 2018–19 campaign Karlsson set a Sharks franchise record for most consecutive games with a point with 14.

On 17 June 2019, Karlsson signed a new eight-year, $92 million contract to remain with the Sharks, with an annual value of $11.5 million. His new contract made Karlsson the highest-paid defenceman in league history and the third highest-paid player in the league at the time, behind Auston Matthews ($11.6 million annually) and Connor McDavid ($12.5 million annually). He broke his thumb on 14 February 2020, in a game against the Winnipeg Jets. He was placed on injured reserve and would miss the remainder of the 2019–20 season.

During the 2022–23 NHL season Karlsson scored his first NHL career hat-trick on 1 November 2022 in a 6–5 shootout loss to the Anaheim Ducks. By 3 February 2023, he was leading all defencemen in points, having accumulated 66 by that time, and was among the leading candidates for the Norris Trophy. On 10 April, Karlsson became the first defenceman to score 100 points in a season since Brian Leetch accomplished it during the 1991–92 season, a feat only five other defencemen have accomplished in league history. Karlsson also became the first Swedish defenceman to accomplish the feat. He finished the season with 101 points (25 goals, 76 assists), a career high in all three categories. His achievements that year attracted wide recognition, and Karlsson was for the first time in his career named a finalist for the Ted Lindsay Award, voted on by the National Hockey League Players' Association for the league's most outstanding player. He was also named a Norris Trophy finalist for the fifth time. He won the award and was named to the NHL First All-Star team on 26 June 2023. During the season, Karlsson also set an NHL record for defencemen by scoring or assisting on 43.35 percent of San Jose's total goals (101 of 233, excluding shootout-deciding goals), while also setting a new Sharks franchise record for points in a season by a defenceman (previously held by Brent Burns) with 101.

In 2023, he was awarded the Victoria Award.

=== Pittsburgh Penguins (2023–present) ===
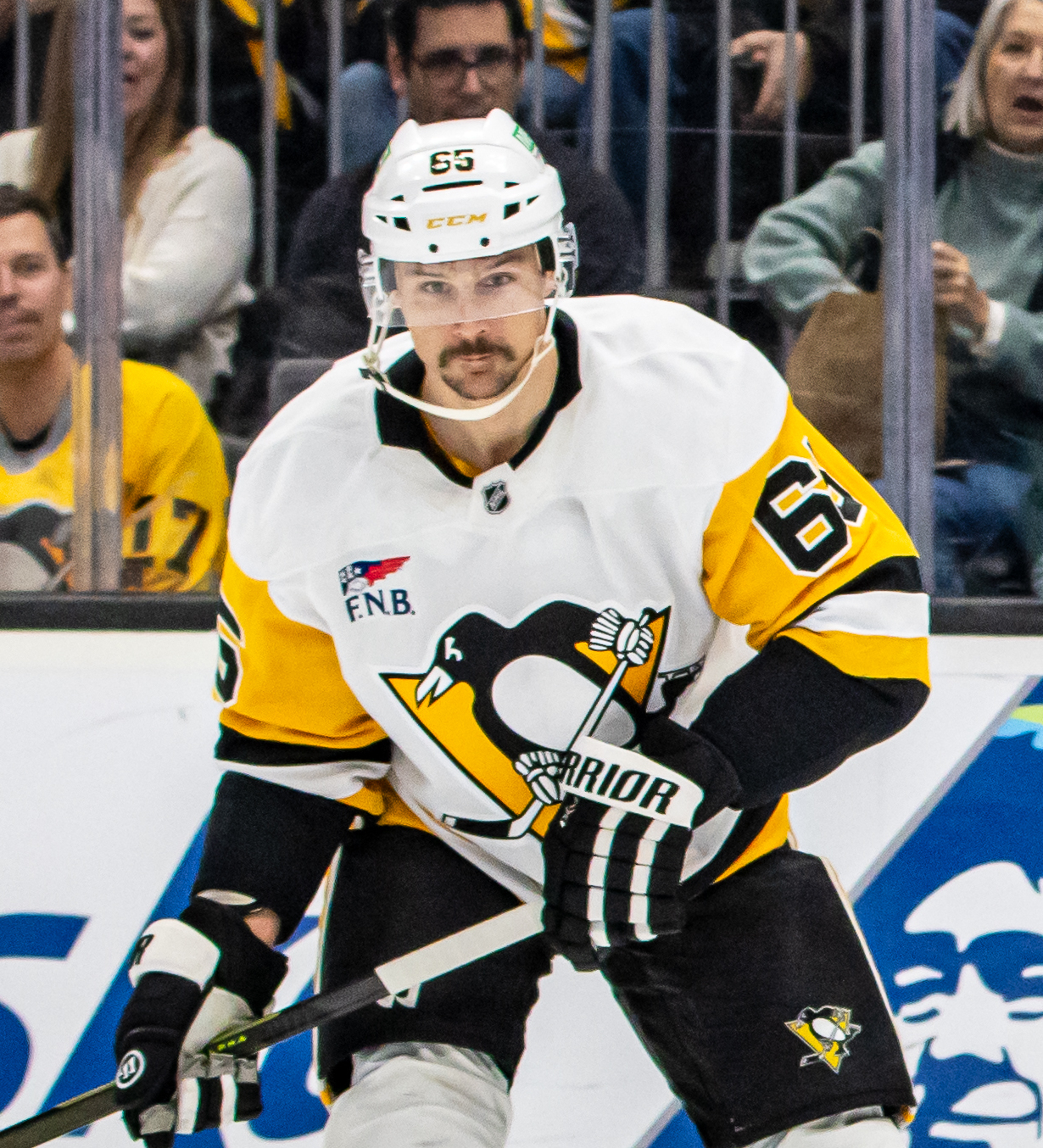
Karlsson with the Pittsburgh Penguins in 2025

On 6 August 2023, Karlsson was traded to the Pittsburgh Penguins in a three-team deal also involving the Montreal Canadiens, with Pittsburgh also receiving forward Rem Pitlick from the Canadiens, as well as forward Dillon Hamaliuk and a 2026 third-round draft pick from San Jose, while Pittsburgh sent out a 2024 first-round draft pick, forward Mikael Granlund, and defenceman Jan Rutta to San Jose (with San Jose also receiving forward Mike Hoffman from Montreal in the trade). Pittsburgh also sent a 2025 second-round draft pick, defenceman Jeff Petry, goaltender Casey DeSmith and forward Nathan Légaré to Montreal.

In the 2023–24 season, Karlsson scored 11 goals and 56 points in 82 games played in his first season with the Penguins.

Karlsson finished the 2024–25 season with 11 goals and 52 points.

Karlsson finished the 2025–26 season with a new high in goals and points since being traded to the Penguins, and second most since the 2016-17 season, with 15 goals and 66 points in 75 games played. Karlsson also acquired 1 goal and 2 assists for 3 points in the 2026 playoffs in 6 games played.

== Style of play ==
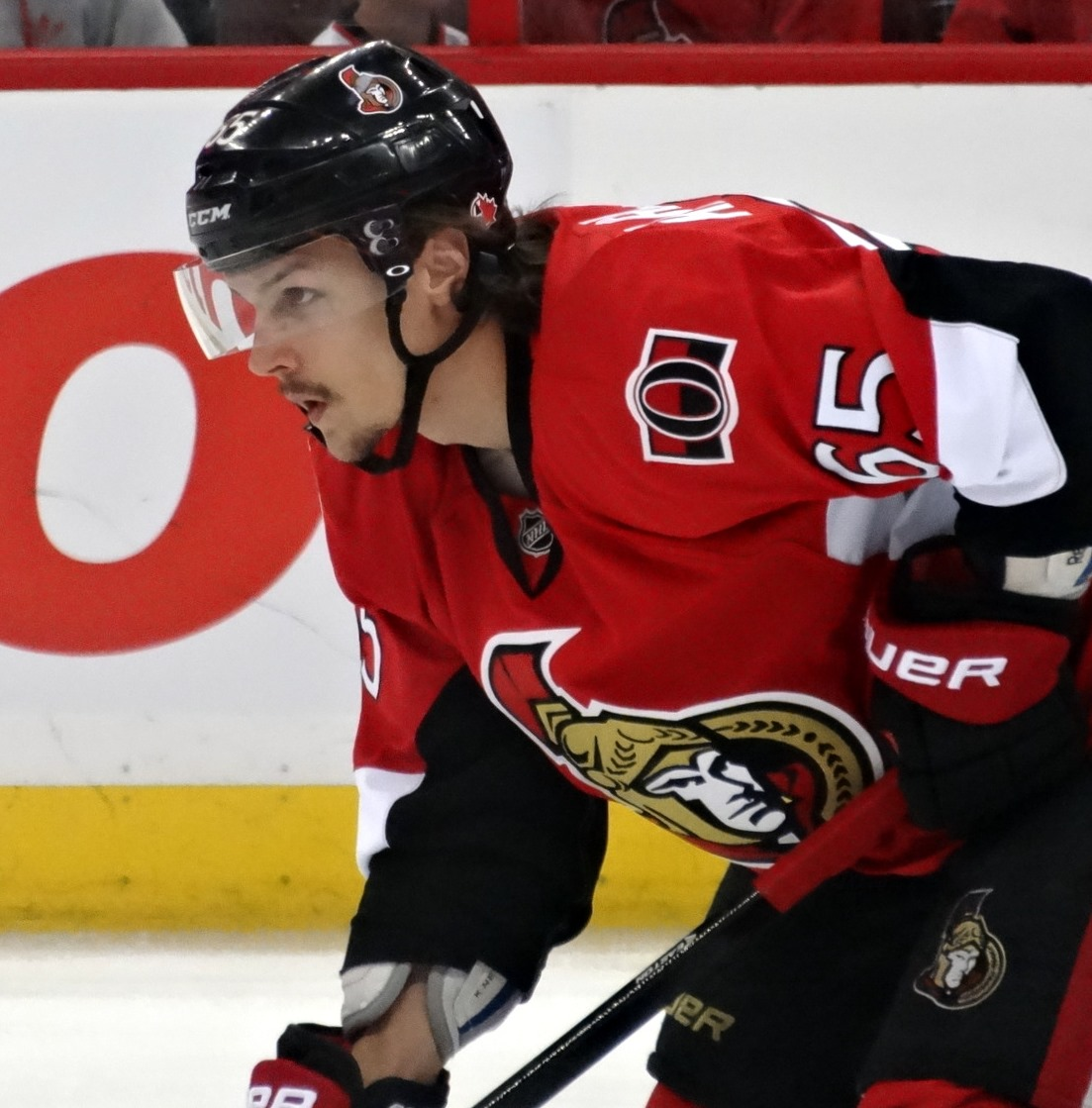
Karlsson in action during a game in May 2013. Throughout his career, Karlsson has been noted for his speed.

Karlsson's performance has been widely acclaimed by current and former ice hockey players, head coaches and the media. He is well known for his speed, such as his ability to lead a rush and be the first man to return to defend, and for making plays. In 2012, Bobby Orr praised Karlsson for his fast skating and performance, comparing him to former defencemen such as Larry Robinson and Paul Coffey, while Coffey himself praised Karlsson as an "elite player" and one of the best players in the NHL. Ken Hitchcock praised Karlsson for his skating skill and reading of plays, saying that he is "ahead of the curve everywhere". Henrik Lundqvist also called Karlsson "one of the best players in the game", complimenting his skating skills and vision of the game. Despite his performance, he has also been criticized for not playing a more defensive role as a defenceman and for his negative career plus–minus rating.

Karlsson is known as being a more offensive defenceman. He has earned more than 70 points in five different seasons and is the second defenceman in league history to lead his team in scoring in four consecutive campaigns.

Karlsson has also shown his grit and toughness as he has played in numerous games and playoff series with very noticeable injuries. In the Ottawa Senators playoff run in 2017, Karlsson was reported to have played on a broken heel, for which he had to get a surgery the following off-season. Karlsson also rushed himself back from a groin injury in the 2019 NHL playoffs to help with the San Jose Sharks playoff run, which also ended in the conference final series.

== International play ==
Medal record

Men's ice hockey

Representing Sweden

Winter Olympics
Silver medal – second place	2014 Sochi	

World Championships
Bronze medal – third place	2010 Cologne	
Bronze medal – third place	2024 Prague	

World Junior Championships
Silver medal – second place	2009 Ottawa	

Karlsson was selected as the tournament's best defenceman at the 2008 IIHF World U18 Championships. He was the tournament's plus/minus leader with a plus eight rating. He led team Sweden in assists, finishing third overall in the tournament with seven in six games, which also tied him for first place in defencemen scoring. During the 2008 U20 4-Nations tournament which Sweden won, Karlsson scored one goal and one assist which tied him with David Rundblad, Viktor Ekbom and Tim Erixon as Sweden's defenceman scoring leader. At the 2009 World Junior Ice Hockey Championships, Karlsson was selected to the all-star team, and as the tournament's best defenceman. With two goals and seven assists in six games, he led all Swedish players in points, and was tied for the tournament lead among defencemen.

Karlsson played at the 2010 World Championships and was the highest scoring defenceman for Sweden with one goal and three assists in nine games.

Karlsson tied for fourth in team scoring with Senators teammate Daniel Alfredsson at the 2012 World Championship with seven points and led all Swedish defencemen in that category. He also finished tied for fifth in points and tied third in goals by defencemen overall in the tournament.

At the 2014 Olympic Tournament held in Sochi, Karlsson led all players with eight points and was tied for second in goals. On 21 February 2014, Karlsson's scored a powerplay goal in the semifinal against Finland to earn Sweden a spot in the gold medal final against Canada. The Swedes would later lose 3–0. Along with a silver medal, Karlsson was named the Best Defenceman of the tournament and was selected to the All-Star team. He led all defencemen at the 2014 Winter Olympics in points, tied for first among the tournament with Phil Kessel.

Karlsson declined an invitation to play for Sweden at the 2015 World Championship due to an undisclosed injury.

On 1 March 2016, Karlsson was announced to represent Sweden at the 2016 World Cup of Hockey. In September, he was named alternate captain alongside Daniel Sedin.

In July 2024, Karlsson was one of the first six players named to Team Sweden at the 2025 Four Nations Face-Off. He was named as one of the alternate captains in January 2025. He finished the tournament with one goal and three points in three games.

On 2 January 2026, Karlsson was named to Team Sweden's roster for the 2026 Winter Olympics. He finished the tournament with four assists in five games as Sweden lost in the quarterfinals to the United States.

== Personal life ==
Karlsson and his first wife, Therese, were divorced in 2013. He married his second wife, Melinda Currey, in Ottawa in August 2017. On 22 November 2017, Karlsson and Currey announced via Instagram that they were expecting their first child, and on 18 December, they revealed it was a boy. On 20 March 2018, the Karlssons announced that their son was stillborn. On 3 October 2019, Karlsson and Melinda announced the birth of a daughter and on 25 February 2022, the couple announced the birth of a second son.

On 12 June 2018, Karlsson's wife filed a protection order against Monika Caryk, girlfriend of Senators' teammate Mike Hoffman, for harassment both before and after the passing of their son. The nature of the alleged harassment included using fake accounts to direct over 1,000 malicious comments towards the Karlssons, including some made regarding the stillbirth of the Karlssons' son. The situation would soon result in legal action against Caryk and the trades of both Karlsson and Hoffman from the Senators' organization.

During a 2018 court deposition, Caryk burst into tears and threatened to leave the room during questioning. She told the court that she and Melinda Karlsson began as friends and that the Karlssons were never outwardly hostile towards her. When asked how the friendship deteriorated, Caryk stated that she became offended after her Facebook and Instagram posts stopped receiving "likes" from Melinda Karlsson, and Caryk became more upset when she stopped receiving invitations to team dinners organized for wives and girlfriends of Senators' players. The deposition revealed that wives and girlfriends of several players associated with the Senators and other organizations had contacted Caryk privately before the matter went public, admonishing her for her continued and increasing hostility towards the Karlssons.

Later that year, Karlsson and his wife organized the charity "Can't Dim My Light" to raise funds and awareness about bullying in schools.

Karlsson's childhood idols included Nicklas Lidström, Daniel Alfredsson, Mats Sundin and Peter Forsberg. He is a supporter of English Premier League football club Arsenal. Karlsson also uses snus, a Swedish form of dipping tobacco, during games.

== Career statistics ==
=== Regular season and playoffs ===
Bold indicates led league

			Regular season					Playoffs
Season	Team	League	GP	G	A	Pts	PIM	GP	G	A	Pts	PIM
2006–07	Södertälje SK	J18 Allsv	2	0	1	1	33	—	—	—	—	—
2006–07	Södertälje SK	J20	10	2	8	10	8	—	—	—	—	—
2007–08	Frölunda HC	J18	2	1	1	2	0	—	—	—	—	—
2007–08	Frölunda HC	J18 Allsv	1	0	1	1	2	2	0	1	1	10
2007–08	Frölunda HC	J20	38	13	24	37	68	5	1	0	1	4
2007–08	Frölunda HC	SEL	7	1	0	1	0	6	0	0	0	0
2008–09	Frölunda HC	J20	1	0	2	2	2	—	—	—	—	—
2008–09	Frölunda HC	SEL	45	5	5	10	10	11	1	2	3	24
2008–09	Borås HC	Allsv	7	0	1	1	14	—	—	—	—	—
2009–10	Binghamton Senators	AHL	12	0	11	11	22	—	—	—	—	—
2009–10	Ottawa Senators	NHL	60	5	21	26	24	6	1	5	6	4
2010–11	Ottawa Senators	NHL	75	13	32	45	50	—	—	—	—	—
2011–12	Ottawa Senators	NHL	81	19	59	78	42	7	1	0	1	4
2012–13	Jokerit	SM-l	30	9	25	34	24	—	—	—	—	—
2012–13	Ottawa Senators	NHL	17	6	8	14	8	10	1	7	8	6
2013–14	Ottawa Senators	NHL	82	20	54	74	36	—	—	—	—	—
2014–15	Ottawa Senators	NHL	82	21	45	66	42	6	1	3	4	2
2015–16	Ottawa Senators	NHL	82	16	**66**	82	50	—	—	—	—	—
2016–17	Ottawa Senators	NHL	77	17	54	71	28	19	2	16	18	10
2017–18	Ottawa Senators	NHL	71	9	53	62	36	—	—	—	—	—
2018–19	San Jose Sharks	NHL	53	3	42	45	22	19	2	14	16	8
2019–20	San Jose Sharks	NHL	56	6	34	40	16	—	—	—	—	—
2020–21	San Jose Sharks	NHL	52	8	14	22	18	—	—	—	—	—
2021–22	San Jose Sharks	NHL	50	10	25	35	14	—	—	—	—	—
2022–23	San Jose Sharks	NHL	82	25	76	101	36	—	—	—	—	—
2023–24	Pittsburgh Penguins	NHL	82	11	45	56	44	—	—	—	—	—
2024–25	Pittsburgh Penguins	NHL	82	11	42	53	20	—	—	—	—	—
2025–26	Pittsburgh Penguins	NHL	75	15	51	66	22	6	1	2	3	10
SEL totals			52	6	5	11	10	17	1	2	3	24
NHL totals			1,159	215	721	936	508	73	9	47	56	44
Liiga totals			30	9	25	34	24	—	—	—	—	—

=== International ===
Year	Team	Event	Result	GP	G	A	Pts	PIM
2007	Sweden	IH18	1st place, gold medalist(s)	4	0	1	1	8
2008	Sweden	WJC18	4th	6	0	7	7	4
2009	Sweden	WJC	2nd place, silver medalist(s)	6	2	7	9	0
2010	Sweden	WC	3rd place, bronze medalist(s)	9	1	3	4	2
2012	Sweden	WC	6th	8	3	4	7	2
2014	Sweden	OG	2nd place, silver medalist(s)	6	4	4	8	0
2016	Sweden	WCH	3rd	4	1	3	4	2
2024	Sweden	WC	3rd place, bronze medalist(s)	10	6	5	11	0
2025	Sweden	4NF	3rd	3	1	2	3	2
2026	Sweden	OG	7th	5	0	4	4	0
Junior totals				16	2	15	17	12
Senior totals				45	16	25	41	8

== Awards and honours ==
=== International ===
Award	Year(s) awarded
WJC U18 Best Defenceman	2008
WJC All-Star team	2009
WJC Best Defenceman	2009
Olympic All-Star team	2014
Olympic Best Defenceman	2014
IIHF World Championship All-Star team	2024

=== NHL ===
Award	Year(s) awarded
NHL All-Star Game	2011, 2012, 2016, 2017, 2018, 2019, 2023
James Norris Memorial Trophy	2012, 2015, 2023
NHL First All-Star team	2012, 2015, 2016, 2017, 2023
NHL All-Decade Second Team	2010–2019
Viking Award	2012, 2016, 2017

Awards and achievements
Preceded by Daniel Sedin	Winner of the Viking Award; 2012	Succeeded by Henrik Zetterberg
Preceded by Nicklas Lidström; Duncan Keith; Cale Makar	James Norris Memorial Trophy winner 2012; 2015; 2023	Succeeded by P. K. Subban; Drew Doughty; Quinn Hughes
Preceded by Jim O'Brien	Ottawa Senators first-round draft pick 2008	Succeeded by Jared Cowen
Sporting positions
Preceded by Jason Spezza	Ottawa Senators captain 2014–2018	Succeeded by Brady Tkachuk
