= 2024 IIHF World Championship playoff round =

Ice hockey tournament results

The playoff round of the 2024 IIHF World Championship was held from 23 to 26 May 2024. The top four of each preliminary group qualified for the playoff round.

== Qualified teams ==
Group	Winners	Runners-up	Third place	Fourth place
A	Canada	Switzerland	Czechia	Finland
B	Sweden	United States	Germany	Slovakia

=== Qualified teams' seedings ===
Quarter-finalists were paired according to their positions in the groups: the first-place team in each preliminary-round group played the fourth-place team of the other group, while the second-place team played the third-place team of the other group.

Semi-finalists were paired according to their seeding after the preliminary round, which was determined by the following criteria. The best-ranked semi-finalist played against the lowest-ranked semi-finalist, while the second-best ranked semi-finalist played the third-best ranked semi-finalist.

Rank	Team	Grp	Pos	Pts	GD	GF	Seed
1	Sweden	B	1	21	+26	35	6
2	Canada	A	1	19	+14	32	1
3	Switzerland	A	2	17	+17	29	7
4	United States	B	2	16	+21	37	4
5	Czechia	A	3	16	+12	26	8
6	Germany	B	3	15	+10	34	5
7	Slovakia	B	4	12	+3	26	9
8	Finland	A	4	10	+7	21	2

Classification rules: 1) position in the group; 2) number of points; 3) goal difference; 4) number of goals scored for; 5) seeding number entering the tournament.

== Bracket ==
There was a re-seeding after the quarterfinals.

Quarter-finals
23 May
1A Canada	6
4B Slovakia	3
23 May
1B Sweden (OT)	2
4A Finland	1
23 May
2A Switzerland	3
3B Germany	1
23 May
2B United States	0
3A Czechia	1

Semi-finals
25 May
1 Sweden	3
5 Czechia	7
25 May
2 Canada	2
3 Switzerland (GWS)	3

Final
26 May
5 Czechia	2
3 Switzerland	0
Third place
26 May
1 Sweden	4
2 Canada	2

All times are local (UTC+2).

== Quarterfinals ==
=== Canada vs Slovakia ===
23 May 2024; 16:20	Canada	6–3 (2–1, 1–0, 3–2)	Slovakia	O2 Arena, Prague; Attendance: 17,275

Game reference

Jordan Binnington
Goalies
Samuel Hlavaj
Referees:
(Czech Republic) Martin Fraňo
(Finland) Mikko Kaukokari
Linesmen:
(United States) Kevin Briganti
(Latvia) Dāvis Zunde

McCann (Parayko) – 02:45	1–0
Dubois (Byram, Tavares) – 04:15	2–0
	2–1	07:56 – Cehlárik (Slafkovský)
Paul (Bedard, Guenther) – 23:48	3–1
Guenther (Paul, Hagel) – 46:20	4–1
Tanev (Severson, Mercer) – 46:40	5–1
	5–2	47:08 – Kelemen (Regenda)
	5–3	56:57 – Hrivík (Hudáček, Nemec) (PP2)
Paul (EN) – 59:10	6–3

10 min
Penalties
12 min
43
Shots
21

=== Switzerland vs Germany ===
23 May 2024; 16:20	Switzerland	3–1 (2–0, 0–1, 1–0)	Germany	Ostravar Aréna, Ostrava; Attendance: 6,583

Game reference

Leonardo Genoni
Goalies
Philipp Grubauer
Referees:
(Finland) Riku Brander
(Sweden) Mikael Holm
Linesmen:
(United States) Shane Gustafson
(Sweden) Anders Nyqvist

Bertschy (SH) – 07:22	1–0
Hischier (Siegenthaler, Fiala) – 16:28	2–0
	2–1	31:33 – Kahun (Stachowiak) (PP)
Bertschy (Thürkauf, Siegenthaler) (EN) – 59:02	3–1

8 min
Penalties
6 min
25
Shots
15

=== United States vs Czechia ===
23 May 2024; 20:20	United States	0–1 (0–0, 0–1, 0–0)	Czechia	O2 Arena, Prague; Attendance: 17,413

Game reference
Charlie Lindgren	Goalies	Lukáš Dostál	Referees: (Sweden) Tobias Björk (Canada) Michael Campbell; Linesmen: (Canada) Tarrington Wyonzek (Sweden) Emil Yletyinen
0–1 / 26:39 – Zacha (Špaček, Červenka) (PP)			Referees: (Sweden) Tobias Björk (Canada) Michael Campbell; Linesmen: (Canada) Tarrington Wyonzek (Sweden) Emil Yletyinen
4 min	Penalties	6 min	Referees: (Sweden) Tobias Björk (Canada) Michael Campbell; Linesmen: (Canada) Tarrington Wyonzek (Sweden) Emil Yletyinen
36	Shots	28	Referees: (Sweden) Tobias Björk (Canada) Michael Campbell; Linesmen: (Canada) Tarrington Wyonzek (Sweden) Emil Yletyinen

=== Sweden vs Finland ===
23 May 2024; 20:20	Sweden	2–1 OT (0–0, 0–0, 1–1) (OT: 1–0)	Finland	Ostravar Aréna, Ostrava; Attendance: 6,691

Game reference

Filip Gustavsson
Goalies
Emil Larmi
Referees:
(Latvia) Andris Ansons
(United States) Sean MacFarlane
Linesmen:
(United States) Nick Briganti
(Czech Republic) Daniel Hynek

Dahlin (Lundeström, Raymond) – 55:02	1–0
	1–1	59:02 – Björninen (Puustinen, Lehtonen) (EA)
Eriksson Ek (Hedman, Dahlin) (PP) – 65:54	2–1

2 min
Penalties
8 min
35
Shots
20

== Semifinals ==
=== Sweden vs Czechia ===
25 May 2024; 14:20	Sweden	3–7 (2–2, 1–3, 0–2)	Czechia	O2 Arena, Prague; Attendance: 17,413

Game reference

Filip Gustavsson
Samuel Ersson
Goalies
Lukáš Dostál
Referees:
(Latvia) Andris Ansons
(Finland) Kristian Vikman
Linesmen:
(United States) Kevin Briganti
(United States) Nick Briganti

Johansson – 03:39	1–0
	1–1	07:48 – Kubalík (Nečas, Kundrátek)
Pettersson (Kempe, Eriksson Ek) – 08:08	2–1
	2–2	09:37 – Kämpf (Nečas)
	2–3	26:05 – Kaše (Sedlák)
	2–4	26:21 – Nečas (Kubalík, Kämpf)
	2–5	29:03 – Kubalík (Kempný, Nečas)
Eriksson Ek (Raymond, Dahlin) (PP) – 35:30	3–5
	3–6	45:40 – Sedlák (Kaše)
	3–7	53:42 – Sedlák

6 min
Penalties
12 min
40
Shots
23

=== Canada vs Switzerland ===
25 May 2024; 18:20	Canada	2–3 GWS (0–2, 1–0, 1–0) (OT: 0–0) (SO: 0–1)	Switzerland	O2 Arena, Prague; Attendance: 11,159

Game reference

Jordan Binnington
Goalies
Leonardo Genoni
Referees:
(Sweden) Mikael Holm
(Czech Republic) Jan Hribik
Linesmen:
(Sweden) Ludvig Lundgren
(Czech Republic) Josef Špůr

	0–1	15:06 – Fiala (Loeffel, Andrighetto) (PP)
	0–2	17:16 – Niederreiter (Josi, Fiala) (PP)
Tanev (Zellweger, Dubois) – 34:07	1–2
Tavares (Bedard, Power) (PP) – 57:53	2–2

Bedard
Dubois (miss)
Severson (miss)
Power (miss)
Cozens (miss)
Shootout
(miss) Senteler
Fiala
(miss) Loeffel
Andrighetto
12 min
Penalties
10 min
44
Shots
31

== Bronze medal game ==
26 May 2024; 15:20	Sweden	4–2 (1–0, 0–1, 3–1)	Canada	O2 Arena, Prague; Attendance: 14,929

Game reference

Filip Gustavsson
Goalies
Jordan Binnington
Referees:
(Finland) Mikko Kaukokari
(United States) Sean MacFarlane
Linesmen:
(Czech Republic) Daniel Hynek
(Czech Republic) Jiří Ondráček

Grundström (L. Johansson, Dahlin) – 12:05	1–0
	1–1	22:41 – Cozens (Oleksiak, Mangiapane)
	1–2	44:18 – Dubois (Hagel, Tavares)
Karlsson (Burakovsky, M. Johansson) – 49:35	2–2
Grundström – 53:42	3–2
M. Johansson (Brodin, Lundeström) (EN) – 59:55	4–2

2 min
Penalties
4 min
33
Shots
22

== Gold medal game ==
26 May 2024; 20:20	Switzerland	0–2 (0–0, 0–0, 0–2)	Czechia	O2 Arena, Prague; Attendance: 17,413

Game reference
Leonardo Genoni	Goalies	Lukáš Dostál	Referees: (Canada) Michael Campbell (Sweden) Mikael Holm; Linesmen: (United States) Nick Briganti (Sweden) Ludvig Lundgren
0–1 / 49:13 – Pastrňák (Kundrátek, Hájek); 0–2 / 59:41 – Kämpf (Kubalík, Nečas) (EN)			Referees: (Canada) Michael Campbell (Sweden) Mikael Holm; Linesmen: (United States) Nick Briganti (Sweden) Ludvig Lundgren
4 min	Penalties	4 min	Referees: (Canada) Michael Campbell (Sweden) Mikael Holm; Linesmen: (United States) Nick Briganti (Sweden) Ludvig Lundgren
31	Shots	32	Referees: (Canada) Michael Campbell (Sweden) Mikael Holm; Linesmen: (United States) Nick Briganti (Sweden) Ludvig Lundgren
