= 2024 IIHF World Championship Group A =

International ice hockey results

Group A was one of two groups of the 2024 IIHF World Championship. The four best-placed teams advanced to the playoff round, while the last placed team was relegated to Division I in 2025.

== Standings ==
| Pos | Team | Pld | W | OTW | OTL | L | GF | GA | GD | Pts | Qualification or relegation |
|---|---|---|---|---|---|---|---|---|---|---|---|
| 1 | Canada | 7 | 5 | 2 | 0 | 0 | 32 | 18 | +14 | 19 | Quarterfinals |
| 2 | Switzerland | 7 | 5 | 1 | 0 | 1 | 29 | 12 | +17 | 17 | Quarterfinals |
| 3 | Czechia (H) | 7 | 4 | 1 | 2 | 0 | 26 | 14 | +12 | 16 | Quarterfinals |
| 4 | Finland | 7 | 3 | 0 | 1 | 3 | 21 | 14 | +7 | 10 | Quarterfinals |
| 5 | Austria | 7 | 2 | 0 | 1 | 4 | 21 | 29 | −8 | 7 | Qualification for 2025 IIHF World Championship |
| 6 | Norway | 7 | 2 | 0 | 0 | 5 | 15 | 25 | −10 | 6 (Note: Denmark 0–2 Norway) | Qualification for 2025 IIHF World Championship |
| 7 | Denmark | 7 | 2 | 0 | 0 | 5 | 15 | 29 | −14 | 6 | Qualification for 2025 IIHF World Championship |
| 8 | Great Britain | 7 | 1 | 0 | 0 | 6 | 12 | 30 | −18 | 3 | Relegation to 2025 Division I A |

Source: IIHF
Rules for classification: 1) points; 2) head-to-head points; 3) head-to-head goal difference; 4) head-to-head number of goals scored; 5) result against closest best-ranked team outside tied teams; 6) result against second-best-ranked team outside tied teams; 7) seeding before tournament
(H) Host

== Matches ==
All times are local (UTC+2).

=== Switzerland vs Norway ===
| 10 May 2024; 16:20 | Switzerland | 5–2 (1–1, 3–0, 1–1) | Norway | O2 Arena, Prague; Attendance: 16,617 |

Game reference

Leonardo Genoni
Goalies
Jonas Arntzen
Referees:
(Finland) Riku Brander
(Sweden) Christoffer Holm
Linesmen:
(United States) Shane Gustafson
(Germany) Andreas Hofer

| Andrighetto (Niederreiter, Loeffel) – 11:04 | 1–0 |
| | 1–1 | 14:53 – Vikingstad (Thoresen, Johannesen) |
| Loeffel (Siegenthaler, Jäger) – 24:12 | 2–1 |
| Senteler (Josi, Simion) – 28:09 | 3–1 |
| Scherwey (Haas) – 33:30 | 4–1 |
| Niederreiter (Ambühl, Kurashev) (PP) – 51:56 | 5–1 |
| | 5–2 | 58:56 – Brandsegg-Nygård (Thoresen, Zuccarello) (PP) |

6 min
Penalties
6 min
40
Shots
15

=== Czechia vs Finland ===
| 10 May 2024; 20:20 | Czechia | 1–0 GWS (0–0, 0–0, 0–0) (OT: 0–0) (SO: 1–0) | Finland | O2 Arena, Prague; Attendance: 17,413 |

Game reference
| Lukáš Dostál | Goalies | Harri Säteri | Referees: (Latvia) Andris Ansons (Sweden) Mikael Holm; Linesmen: (United States) Nick Briganti (Slovakia) Oto Durmis |
| Kaše; Krejčík (miss); Palát (miss); Červenka | Shootout | (miss) Kaski; (miss) Granlund; (miss) Puljujärvi; (miss) Kapanen | Referees: (Latvia) Andris Ansons (Sweden) Mikael Holm; Linesmen: (United States) Nick Briganti (Slovakia) Oto Durmis |
| 8 min | Penalties | 6 min | Referees: (Latvia) Andris Ansons (Sweden) Mikael Holm; Linesmen: (United States) Nick Briganti (Slovakia) Oto Durmis |
| 28 | Shots | 21 | Referees: (Latvia) Andris Ansons (Sweden) Mikael Holm; Linesmen: (United States) Nick Briganti (Slovakia) Oto Durmis |

=== Great Britain vs Canada ===
| 11 May 2024; 12:20 | Great Britain | 2–4 (1–1, 0–3, 1–0) | Canada | O2 Arena, Prague; Attendance: 16,935 |

Game reference

Jackson Whistle
Goalies
Joel Hofer
Referees:
(Sweden) Christoffer Holm
(Finland) Kristian Vikman
Linesmen:
(United States) Shane Gustafson
(Sweden) Anders Nyqvist

| Kirk (Mosey, Lake) (PP) – 07:47 | 1–0 |
| | 1–1 | 08:17 – Bunting (Byram) |
| | 1–2 | 25:45 – Hagel (Zellweger, Dubois) |
| | 1–3 | 31:39 – Bedard (Bunting, Zellweger) |
| | 1–4 | 35:29 – Bedard (Paul, Guhle) |
| O'Connor (Kirk, Betteridge) – 48:49 | 2–4 |

8 min
Penalties
4 min
15
Shots
34

=== Austria vs Denmark ===
| 11 May 2024; 16:20 | Austria | 1–5 (1–2, 0–1, 0–2) | Denmark | O2 Arena, Prague; Attendance: 15,719 |

Game reference

David Madlener
Goalies
Frederik Dichow
Referees:
(Sweden) Mikael Holm
(Germany) André Schrader
Linesmen:
(United States) Nick Briganti
(Czech Republic) Daniel Hynek

| | 0–1 | 13:19 – M. Lauridsen (Blichfeld, Russell) |
| | 0–2 | 16:11 – Storm (SH) |
| Ganahl (Haudum, Rohrer) – 19:35 | 1–2 |
| | 1–3 | 38:54 – Blichfeld (Wejse, O. Lauridsen) |
| | 1–4 | 53:44 – Scheel (Bruggisser, N. Jensen) |
| | 1–5 | 58:57 – Blichfeld (Aagaard, Russell) (PP) |

12 min
Penalties
6 min
17
Shots
34

=== Norway vs Czechia ===
| 11 May 2024; 20:20 | Norway | 3–6 (3–2, 0–1, 0–3) | Czechia | O2 Arena, Prague; Attendance: 17,413 |

Game reference

Henrik Haukeland
Goalies
Petr Mrázek
Referees:
(Slovakia) Tomáš Hronský
(United States) Sean MacFarlane
Linesmen:
(Germany) Tim Heffner
(Sweden) Ludvig Lundgren

| | 0–1 | 06:06 – Červenka (Kundrátek, Kaše) |
| Solberg (Thoresen, Zuccarello) – 06:37 | 1–1 |
| Steen (Trettenes) (SH) – 12:10 | 2–1 |
| E. Salsten (Solberg, Zuccarello) – 16:32 | 3–1 |
| | 3–2 | 17:12 – Červenka (Sedlák, Kaše) |
| | 3–3 | 35:54 – Beránek (Kempný) |
| | 3–4 | 45:19 – Stránský (Krejčík, Kämpf) |
| | 3–5 | 56:59 – Hájek (Palát) |
| | 3–6 | 59:06 – Palát (Kämpf, Voženílek) (EN) |

16 min
Penalties
10 min
11
Shots
48

=== Finland vs Great Britain ===
| 12 May 2024; 12:20 | Finland | 8–0 (1–0, 5–0, 2–0) | Great Britain | O2 Arena, Prague; Attendance: 15,433 |

Game reference

Emil Larmi
Goalies
Ben Bowns
Referees:
(Latvia) Andris Ansons
(Sweden) Mikael Holm
Linesmen:
(Slovakia) Oto Durmis
(Sweden) Ludvig Lundgren

| Kapanen (Kaski) – 16:14 | 1–0 |
| Puljujärvi (Kaski, Oksanen) – 21:15 | 2–0 |
| Innala (Granlund, Pakarinen) (PP) – 24:52 | 3–0 |
| Riikola (Puljujärvi, Oksanen) – 32:49 | 4–0 |
| Kapanen (Puljujärvi, Granlund) – 36:01 | 5–0 |
| Määttä (Granlund) – 38:45 | 6–0 |
| Lehtonen (Helenius, Granlund) – 46:39 | 7–0 |
| Kapanen (Määttä, Oksanen) – 52:57 | 8–0 |

4 min
Penalties
10 min
47
Shots
14

=== Denmark vs Canada ===
| 12 May 2024; 16:20 | Denmark | 1–5 (0–2, 1–0, 0–3) | Canada | O2 Arena, Prague; Attendance: 16,015 |

Game reference

Frederik Dichow
Goalies
Jordan Binnington
Referees:
(Finland) Riku Brander
(Slovakia) Tomáš Hronský
Linesmen:
(Germany) Tim Heffner
(Germany) Andreas Hofer

| | 0–1 | 02:24 – Bedard (Bunting, Guhle) |
| | 0–2 | 15:25 – Cozens (Tavares, Byram) (PP) |
| Wejse (Storm, Poulsen) – 26:15 | 1–2 |
| | 1–3 | 41:52 – Bedard (Guenther) |
| | 1–4 | 58:00 – Mercer (McBain, Tanev) (EN) |
| | 1–5 | 59:39 – Dubois (Bedard, Zellweger) (PP) |

12 min
Penalties
12 min
20
Shots
42

=== Austria vs Switzerland ===
| 12 May 2024; 20:20 | Austria | 5–6 (2–1, 2–3, 1–2) | Switzerland | O2 Arena, Prague; Attendance: 13,512 |

Game reference

David Kickert
Goalies
Reto Berra
Akira Schmid
Referees:
(United States) Sean MacFarlane
(Finland) Kristian Vikman
Linesmen:
(United States) Shane Gustafson
(Sweden) Anders Nyqvist

| Unterweger (Rossi) – 04:15 | 1–0 |
| P. Huber (Rohrer) – 14:33 | 2–0 |
| | 2–1 | 15:48 – Josi (Loeffel, Ambühl) (PP2) |
| Haudum (Zwerger, Unterweger) (PP) – 21:48 | 3–1 |
| | 3–2 | 22:26 – Hischier (Josi, Loeffel) |
| | 3–3 | 29:30 – Josi (Ambühl, Hischier) (PP2) |
| | 3–4 | 29:43 – Jäger (Andrighetto, Kukan) (PP) |
| Haudum (Unterweger, M. Huber) (PP) – 34:45 | 4–4 |
| | 4–5 | 40:43 – Hischier (Kurashev, Niederreiter) (PP) |
| Baumgartner (Maier, Strong) – 52:17 | 5–5 |
| | 5–6 | 59:09 – Hischier (Josi, Ambühl) (PP) |

12 min
Penalties
6 min
18
Shots
36

=== Norway vs Finland ===
| 13 May 2024; 16:20 | Norway | 1–4 (0–2, 1–2, 0–0) | Finland | O2 Arena, Prague; Attendance: 16,127 |

Game reference

Jonas Arntzen
Goalies
Harri Säteri
Referees:
(Sweden) Christoffer Holm
(Slovakia) Tomáš Hronský
Linesmen:
(Czech Republic) Daniel Hynek
(Sweden) Ludvig Lundgren

| | 0–1 | 06:49 – Kapanen (Kaski) (PP) |
| | 0–2 | 17:56 – Hyry (Kaski, Innala) |
| | 0–3 | 20:27 – Hyry (Jääskä, Innala) |
| | 0–4 | 30:59 – Kapanen (Oksanen) |
| Krogdahl (Johannesen) – 38:47 | 1–4 |

10 min
Penalties
4 min
14
Shots
42

=== Switzerland vs Czechia ===
| 13 May 2024; 20:20 | Switzerland | 2–1 GWS (1–0, 0–1, 0–0) (OT: 0–0) (SO: 1–0) | Czechia | O2 Arena, Prague; Attendance: 17,413 |

Game reference
| Leonardo Genoni | Goalies | Lukáš Dostál | Referees: (Latvia) Andris Ansons (Germany) André Schrader; Linesmen: (Slovakia) Oto Durmis (Sweden) Anders Nyqvist |
| Fiala (Hischier, Josi) (PP) – 13:36 / 1–0; / 1–1 / 35:57 – Stránský (Špaček, Červenka) (PP) | | | Referees: (Latvia) Andris Ansons (Germany) André Schrader; Linesmen: (Slovakia) Oto Durmis (Sweden) Anders Nyqvist |
| Andrighetto (miss); Fiala; Kurashev; Loeffel (miss); Josi (miss) | Shootout | (miss) Kaše; Stránský; (miss) Tomášek; (miss) Červenka; (miss) Flek | Referees: (Latvia) Andris Ansons (Germany) André Schrader; Linesmen: (Slovakia) Oto Durmis (Sweden) Anders Nyqvist |
| 10 min | Penalties | 12 min | Referees: (Latvia) Andris Ansons (Germany) André Schrader; Linesmen: (Slovakia) Oto Durmis (Sweden) Anders Nyqvist |
| 26 | Shots | 24 | Referees: (Latvia) Andris Ansons (Germany) André Schrader; Linesmen: (Slovakia) Oto Durmis (Sweden) Anders Nyqvist |

=== Denmark vs Norway ===
| 14 May 2024; 16:20 | Denmark | 0–2 (0–0, 0–1, 0–1) | Norway | O2 Arena, Prague; Attendance: 10,011 |

Game reference
| Frederik Dichow | Goalies | Henrik Haukeland | Referees: (Finland) Mikko Kaukokari (United States) Sean MacFarlane; Linesmen: (United States) Kevin Briganti (United States) Shane Gustafson |
| 0–1 / 27:45 – Brandsegg-Nygård (Zuccarello, Thoresen); 0–2 / 59:49 – Salsten (EN) | | | Referees: (Finland) Mikko Kaukokari (United States) Sean MacFarlane; Linesmen: (United States) Kevin Briganti (United States) Shane Gustafson |
| 4 min | Penalties | 6 min | Referees: (Finland) Mikko Kaukokari (United States) Sean MacFarlane; Linesmen: (United States) Kevin Briganti (United States) Shane Gustafson |
| 24 | Shots | 29 | Referees: (Finland) Mikko Kaukokari (United States) Sean MacFarlane; Linesmen: (United States) Kevin Briganti (United States) Shane Gustafson |

=== Canada vs Austria ===
| 14 May 2024; 20:20 | Canada | 7–6 OT (3–1, 3–0, 0–5) (OT: 1–0) | Austria | O2 Arena, Prague; Attendance: 14,704 |

Game reference

Jordan Binnington
Goalies
David Madlener
Referees:
(Latvia) Andris Ansons
(Finland) Lassi Heikkinen
Linesmen:
(Czech Republic) Daniel Hynek
(Latvia) Dāvis Zunde

| Cozens (Mangiapane, Guhle – 06:34 | 1–0 |
| Guhle (Tavares, Hagel) – 09:21 | 2–0 |
| | 2–1 | 10:11 – Nissner (M. Huber, Raffl) |
| Byram (Zellweger) – 13:29 | 3–1 |
| McCann (Bunting) – 22:57 | 4–1 |
| Bedard (Guenther, Parayko) – 29:32 | 5–1 |
| Dubois (Hagel, Power) – 37:56 | 6–1 |
| | 6–2 | 43:14 – Baumgartner (Schneider) |
| | 6–3 | 44:08 – Schneider (Zwerger, Wolf) |
| | 6–4 | 50:41 – Zwerger (Nickl) |
| | 6–5 | 55:56 – Schneider (Zwerger, Rossi) |
| | 6–6 | 59:11 – Rossi (EA) |
| Tavares (Dubois, Parayko) – 60:15 | 7–6 |

4 min
Penalties
4 min
49
Shots
21

=== Czechia vs Denmark ===
| 15 May 2024; 16:20 | Czechia | 7–4 (1–1, 2–1, 4–2) | Denmark | O2 Arena, Prague; Attendance: 17,413 |

Game reference

Lukáš Dostál
Goalies
Frederik Dichow
Referees:
(Slovakia) Tomáš Hronský
(Germany) André Schrader
Linesmen:
(United States) Kevin Briganti
(Sweden) Anders Nyqvist

| | 0–1 | 18:54 – Wejse (Blichfeld, Bruggisser) (PP) |
| Rutta (Kämpf) – 19:52 | 1–1 |
| Flek (Kondelík, Voženílek) – 22:50 | 2–1 |
| Sedlák (Kaše, Červenka) – 24:29 | 3–1 |
| | 3–2 | 39:36 – Russell (N. Jensen, Bruggisser) |
| | 3–3 | 44:43 – Mølgaard (Lauridsen, Lassen) |
| Kundrátek (Tomášek, Krejčík) – 46:16 | 4–3 |
| Kubalík (Tomášek, Palát) – 51:10 | 5–3 |
| Stránský (Kämpf, Voženílek – 51:30 | 6–3 |
| | 6–4 | 51:51 – From (Scheel, Wejse) |
| Palát (Kempný) – 53:08 | 7–4 |

6 min
Penalties
6 min
39
Shots
18

=== Switzerland vs Great Britain ===
| 15 May 2024; 20:20 | Switzerland | 3–0 (2–0, 1–0, 0–0) | Great Britain | O2 Arena, Prague; Attendance: 15,239 |

Game reference

Akira Schmid
Goalies
Jackson Whistle
Referees:
(Latvia) Andris Ansons
(Finland) Lassi Heikkinen
Linesmen:
(Germany) Tim Heffner
(Sweden) Ludvig Lundgren

| Hischier (Josi, Fiala) – 03:48 | 1–0 |
| Kukan (Siegenthaler, Herzog) – 13:36 | 2–0 |
| Niederreiter (Fiala, Josi) (PP) – 38:36 | 3–0 |

10 min
Penalties
10 min
30
Shots
15

=== Finland vs Austria ===
| 16 May 2024; 16:20 | Finland | 2–3 (2–0, 0–1, 0–2) | Austria | O2 Arena, Prague; Attendance: 15,387 |

Game reference

Harri Säteri
Goalies
David Kickert
Referees:
(Sweden) Tobias Björk
(Switzerland) Michael Tscherrig
Linesmen:
(Canada) Tarrington Wyonzek
(Latvia) Dāvis Zunde

| Mäenalanen (Pakarinen, Vittasmäki) – 02:51 | 1–0 |
| Kapanen (Riikola, Kaski) – 08:06 | 2–0 |
| | 2–1 | 23:36 – M. Huber (Raffl, Nissner) |
| | 2–2 | 49:51 – Nickl (Nissner, M. Huber) |
| | 2–3 | 59:59 – Baumgartner (Haudum, Ganahl) |

6 min
Penalties
6 min
32
Shots
20

=== Canada vs Norway ===
| 16 May 2024; 20:20 | Canada | 4–1 (1–0, 1–0, 2–1) | Norway | O2 Arena, Prague; Attendance: 16,418 |

Game reference

Nico Daws
Goalies
Henrik Haukeland
Referees:
(Finland) Mikko Kaukokari
(Germany) André Schrader
Linesmen:
(Czech Republic) Daniel Hynek
(Finland) Lauri Nikulainen

| Tanev (Guhle, McBain) – 11:50 | 1–0 |
| Mangiapane (Byram, Oleksiak) – 22:16 | 2–0 |
| | 2–1 | 42:47 – Solberg (E. Salsten, Steen) |
| Cozens (SH) – 46:37 | 3–1 |
| McCann (Daws) (EN) – 58:30 | 4–1 |

6 min
Penalties
6 min
33
Shots
6

=== Great Britain vs Denmark ===
| 17 May 2024; 16:20 | Great Britain | 3–4 (2–2, 1–1, 0–1) | Denmark | O2 Arena, Prague; Attendance: 16,277 |

Game reference

Jackson Whistle
Goalies
Frederik Dichow
Referees:
(Sweden) Tobias Björk
(United States) Sean MacFarlane
Linesmen:
(United States) Kevin Briganti
(Canada) Tarrington Wyonzek

| Kirk (Curran, Ruopp) – 05:25 | 1–0 |
| | 1–1 | 06:26 – Aagaard (Mølgaard, Olesen) |
| | 1–2 | 08:25 – Bruggisser (Olesen, Wejse) (PP) |
| Neilson (Mosey, Lake) – 10:34 | 2–2 |
| | 2–3 | 21:42 – Aagaard (Olesen, Mølgaard) |
| Halbert (Lachowicz, Perlini) – 38:34 | 3–3 |
| | 3–4 | 52:01 – Wejse (Blichfeld, Bruggisser) (PP) |

14 min
Penalties
12 min
31
Shots
28

=== Czechia vs Austria ===
| 17 May 2024; 20:20 | Czechia | 4–0 (1–0, 2–0, 1–0) | Austria | O2 Arena, Prague; Attendance: 17,413 |

Game reference

Petr Mrázek
Goalies
David Madlener
Referees:
(Finland) Lassi Heikkinen
(Finland) Mikko Kaukokari
Linesmen:
(Germany) Tim Heffner
(Finland) Lauri Nikulainen

| Kaše (PS) – 19:32 | 1–0 |
| Kubalík (Tomášek, Špaček) (PP) – 35:49 | 2–0 |
| Flek (Stránský) (PP) – 36:53 | 3–0 |
| Tomášek (Palát, Kubalík) – 41:31 | 4–0 |

6 min
Penalties
6 min
30
Shots
21

=== Denmark vs Switzerland ===
| 18 May 2024; 12:20 | Denmark | 0–8 (0–2, 0–3, 0–3) | Switzerland | O2 Arena, Prague; Attendance: 17,225 |

Game reference

Frederik Dichow
Mathias Seldrup
Goalies
Leonardo Genoni
Referees:
(Czech Republic) Jan Hribik
(Finland) Mikko Kaukokari
Linesmen:
(Czech Republic) Daniel Hynek
(Canada) Tarrington Wyonzek

| 0–1 | 04:10 – Hischier (Fiala, Josi) |
| 0–2 | 17:15 – Josi |
| 0–3 | 20:39 – Fiala (Ambühl, Hischier) (PP) |
| 0–4 | 23:58 – Fiala (Hischier) |
| 0–5 | 33:43 – Senteler (Simion) |
| 0–6 | 42:49 – Thürkauf (SH) |
| 0–7 | 45:26 – Bertschy (Scherwey, Thurkauf) |
| 0–8 | 54:18 – Scherwey (Bertschy, Kukan) |

10 min
Penalties
4 min
17
Shots
29

=== Canada vs Finland ===
| 18 May 2024; 16:20 | Canada | 5–3 (2–2, 1–1, 2–0) | Finland | O2 Arena, Prague; Attendance: 17,303 |

Game reference

Jordan Binnington
Goalies
Harri Säteri
Referees:
(United States) Sean MacFarlane
(Germany) André Schrader
Linesmen:
(Sweden) Emil Yletyinen
(Latvia) Dāvis Zunde

| | 0–1 | 01:35 – Puljujärvi (Rissanen, Innala) |
| | 0–2 | 03:51 – Puustinen (Hyry, Saarijärvi) (PP) |
| Cozens (Mangiapane, Power) – 14:53 | 1–2 |
| Tanev (Tavares) – 16:30 | 2–2 |
| | 2–3 | 36:07 – Puljujärvi (Vittasmäki, Mäenalanen) |
| Power (Cozens, Parayko) – 37:12 | 3–3 |
| Hagel (Tavares, Dubois) – 51:32 | 4–3 |
| Mercer (Power) (EN) – 59:39 | 5–3 |

31 min
Penalties
8 min
22
Shots
32

=== Czechia vs Great Britain ===
| 18 May 2024; 20:20 | Czechia | 4–1 (2–0, 2–1, 0–0) | Great Britain | O2 Arena, Prague; Attendance: 17,413 |

Game reference

Lukáš Dostál
Goalies
Ben Bowns
Referees:
(Canada) Mark Pearce
(Switzerland) Michael Tscherrig
Linesmen:
(Switzerland) Dario Fuchs
(Finland) Lauri Nikulainen

| Sedlák (Červenka, Krejčík) – 02:18 | 1–0 |
| Krejčík (Gudas, Červenka) – 04:46 | 2–0 |
| Sedlák (Červenka, Kaše) – 20:36 | 3–0 |
| | 3–1 | 22:17 – Mosey (Kirk, O'Connor) (PP) |
| Kaše (Sedlák, Červenka) (PP) – 32:15 | 4–1 |

10 min
Penalties
4 min
45
Shots
15

=== Norway vs Austria ===
| 19 May 2024; 16:20 | Norway | 1–4 (0–0, 0–3, 1–1) | Austria | O2 Arena, Prague; Attendance: 16,565 |

Game reference

Henrik Haukeland
Goalies
David Kickert
Referees:
(Sweden) Tobias Björk
(Switzerland) Michael Tscherrig
Linesmen:
(Switzerland) Dario Fuchs
(Sweden) Emil Yletyinen

| | 0–1 | 28:14 – Schneider (Heinrich, Rossi) |
| | 0–2 | 28:54 – Zwerger (Schneider, Rossi) |
| | 0–3 | 33:53 – Schneider (Rossi, Brunner) (EA) |
| Engebråten (Zuccarello) – 53:04 | 1–3 |
| | 1–4 | 57:24 – M. Huber (Zwerger) (EN) |

12 min
Penalties
10 min
27
Shots
27

=== Switzerland vs Canada ===
| 19 May 2024; 20:20 | Switzerland | 2–3 (1–1, 1–2, 0–0) | Canada | O2 Arena, Prague; Attendance: 17,268 |

Game reference

Leonardo Genoni
Goalies
Jordan Binnington
Referees:
(Finland) Lassi Heikkinen
(Czech Republic) Jan Hribik
Linesmen:
(United States) Kevin Briganti
(Finland) Lauri Nikulainen

| | 0–1 | 01:42 – Cozens (Tavares, Mangiapane) (PP) |
| Fiala (Hischier, Josi) (PP) – 11:15 | 1–1 |
| Loeffel (Thürkauf, Fora) – 25:03 | 2–1 |
| | 2–2 | 28:46 – Cozens (Mangiapane, Tavares) (PP) |
| | 2–3 | 30:39 – Paul (Mangiapane, Cozens) (PP) |

31 min
Penalties
12 min
22
Shots
23

=== Great Britain vs Norway ===
| 20 May 2024; 16:20 | Great Britain | 2–5 (0–3, 1–1, 1–1) | Norway | O2 Arena, Prague; Attendance: 13,679 |

Game reference

Jackson Whistle
Goalies
Henrik Haukeland
Referees:
(Czech Republic) Martin Fraňo
(Canada) Mark Pearce
Linesmen:
(Czech Republic) Jiří Ondráček
(Latvia) Dāvis Zunde

| | 0–1 | 04:34 – Vikingstad (Krogdahl, Engebråten) |
| | 0–2 | 06:46 – Thoresen |
| | 0–3 | 12:25 – Olsen (Steen, Brandsegg-Nygård) |
| | 0–4 | 21:18 – Brandsegg-Nygård (Thoresen, Zuccarello) (PP) |
| Perlini (Dowd, O'Connor) (PP) – 24:56 | 1–4 |
| | 1–5 | 44:36 – Olsen (Brandsegg-Nygård) |
| Betteridge (Lake, Mosey) – 47:25 | 2–5 |

12 min
Penalties
6 min
25
Shots
42

=== Finland vs Denmark ===
| 20 May 2024; 20:20 | Finland | 3–1 (0–0, 0–0, 3–1) | Denmark | O2 Arena, Prague; Attendance: 16,251 |

Game reference

Emil Larmi
Goalies
Mathias Seldrup
Referees:
(Canada) Michael Campbell
(Switzerland) Michael Tscherrig
Linesmen:
(Switzerland) Dario Fuchs
(Czech Republic) Josef Špůr

| Björninen (Mattila, Määttä) – 43:26 | 1–0 |
| Rissanen – 45:03 | 2–0 |
| | 2–1 | 58:16 – True (Mølgaard, Russell) (EA) |
| Jormakka (EN) – 59:07 | 3–1 |

4 min
Penalties
8 min
35
Shots
22

=== Austria vs Great Britain ===
| 21 May 2024; 12:20 | Austria | 2–4 (0–0, 1–1, 1–3) | Great Britain | O2 Arena, Prague; Attendance: 16,306 |

Game reference

David Kickert
Goalies
Ben Bowns
Referees:
(Czech Republic) Jan Hribik
(Canada) Mark Pearce
Linesmen:
(Czech Republic) Jiří Ondráček
(Czech Republic) Josef Špůr

| Unterweger (Zwerger, Haudum) (PP) – 22:40 | 1–0 |
| | 1–1 | 27:44 – O'Connor (Lake) (PP2) |
| | 1–2 | 41:59 – Perlini (Dowd, O'Connor) (PP) |
| | 1–3 | 50:25 – Mosey (Duggan, Tetlow) |
| | 1–4 | 55:31 – Dowd (Perlini) (EN) |
| M. Huber (Haudum, Zwerger) (PP) – 59:15 | 2–4 |

8 min
Penalties
10 min
28
Shots
32

=== Canada vs Czechia ===
| 21 May 2024; 16:20 | Canada | 4–3 OT (0–0, 0–0, 3–3) (OT: 1–0) | Czechia | O2 Arena, Prague; Attendance: 17,413 |

Game reference

Jordan Binnington
Goalies
Lukáš Dostál
Referees:
(Sweden) Tobias Björk
(Finland) Mikko Kaukokari
Linesmen:
(United States) Kevin Briganti
(Sweden) Emil Yletyinen

| Cozens (Power, Paul) (PP) – 41:01 | 1–0 |
| | 1–1 | 49:11 – Kubalík (Nečas, Sedlák) (PP) |
| Mercer (Severson) – 51:01 | 2–1 |
| Hagel (Tavares, Dubois) – 55:42 | 3–1 |
| | 3–2 | 56:56 – Palát (Špaček, Červenka) (PP, EA) |
| | 3–3 | 58:11 – Červenka (Nečas, Špaček) (EA) |
| Cozens (SH) – 63:13 | 4–3 |

8 min
Penalties
4 min
26
Shots
22

=== Finland vs Switzerland ===
| 21 May 2024; 20:20 | Finland | 1–3 (0–0, 1–2, 0–1) | Switzerland | O2 Arena, Prague; Attendance: 17,118 |

Game reference

Harri Säteri
Goalies
Akira Schmid
Referees:
(Canada) Michael Campbell
(Czech Republic) Martin Fraňo
Linesmen:
(Canada) Tarrington Wyonzek
(Latvia) Dāvis Zunde

| | 0–1 | 25:14 – Fiala (Loeffel) |
| | 0–2 | 27:26 – Glauser (Niederreiter, Fiala) |
| Innala (Granlund, Lehtonen) (PP) – 37:51 | 1–2 |
| | 1–3 | 56:33 – Fiala (Niederreiter) |

29 min
Penalties
4 min
16
Shots
26
