= 2024 IIHF World Championship final =

Ice hockey game

	1	2	3	Total
Switzerland	0	0	0	0
Czechia	0	0	2	2
- Date: 26 May 2024
- Arena: O2 Arena
- City: Prague
- Attendance: 17,413

The 2024 IIHF World Championship final was played at the O2 Arena in Prague, Czechia on 26 May 2024 to decide the winner of the 2024 IIHF World Championship.

Switzerland and Czechia faced each other for the first time in the finals. Switzerland attempted to win their first Ice Hockey World Championships gold medal.

In front of a sold-out O2 Arena, home side Czechia defeated Switzerland 2–0, to win their first championship since 2010.

== Road to the final ==
Switzerland
Round
Czechia
Opponent
Result
Preliminary round
Opponent
Result
Norway
5–2
Game 1
Finland
1–0 (GWS)
Austria
6–5
Game 2
Norway
6–3
Czechia
2–1 (GWS)
Game 3
Switzerland
1–2 (GWS)
Great Britain
3–0
Game 4
Denmark
7–4
Denmark
8–0
Game 5
Austria
4–0
Canada
2–3
Game 6
Great Britain
4–1
Finland
3–1
Game 7
Canada
3–4 (OT)

Pos	Team	Pld	Pts
1	Canada	7	19
2	Switzerland	7	17
3	Czechia (H)	7	16
4	Finland	7	10
5	Austria	7	7
6	Norway	7	6
7	Denmark	7	6
8	Great Britain	7	3

Source: IIHF
(H) Host
Preliminary

Pos	Team	Pld	Pts
1	Canada	7	19
2	Switzerland	7	17
3	Czechia (H)	7	16
4	Finland	7	10
5	Austria	7	7
6	Norway	7	6
7	Denmark	7	6
8	Great Britain	7	3

Source: IIHF
(H) Host
Opponent
Result
Playoff
Opponent
Result
Germany
3–1
Quarterfinals
United States
1–0
Canada
3–2 (GWS)
Semifinals
Sweden
7–3

== Match ==
26 May 2024; 20:20	Switzerland	0–2 (0–0, 0–0, 0–2)	Czechia	O2 Arena, Prague; Attendance: 17,413

Game reference
Leonardo Genoni	Goalies	Lukáš Dostál	Referees: (Canada) Michael Campbell (Sweden) Mikael Holm; Linesmen: (United States) Nick Briganti (Sweden) Ludvig Lundgren
0–1 / 49:13 – Pastrňák (Kundrátek, Hájek); 0–2 / 59:41 – Kämpf (Kubalík, Nečas) (EN)			Referees: (Canada) Michael Campbell (Sweden) Mikael Holm; Linesmen: (United States) Nick Briganti (Sweden) Ludvig Lundgren
4 min	Penalties	4 min	Referees: (Canada) Michael Campbell (Sweden) Mikael Holm; Linesmen: (United States) Nick Briganti (Sweden) Ludvig Lundgren
31	Shots	32	Referees: (Canada) Michael Campbell (Sweden) Mikael Holm; Linesmen: (United States) Nick Briganti (Sweden) Ludvig Lundgren
