= Rasmus Dahlin =

Swedish ice hockey player (born 2000)

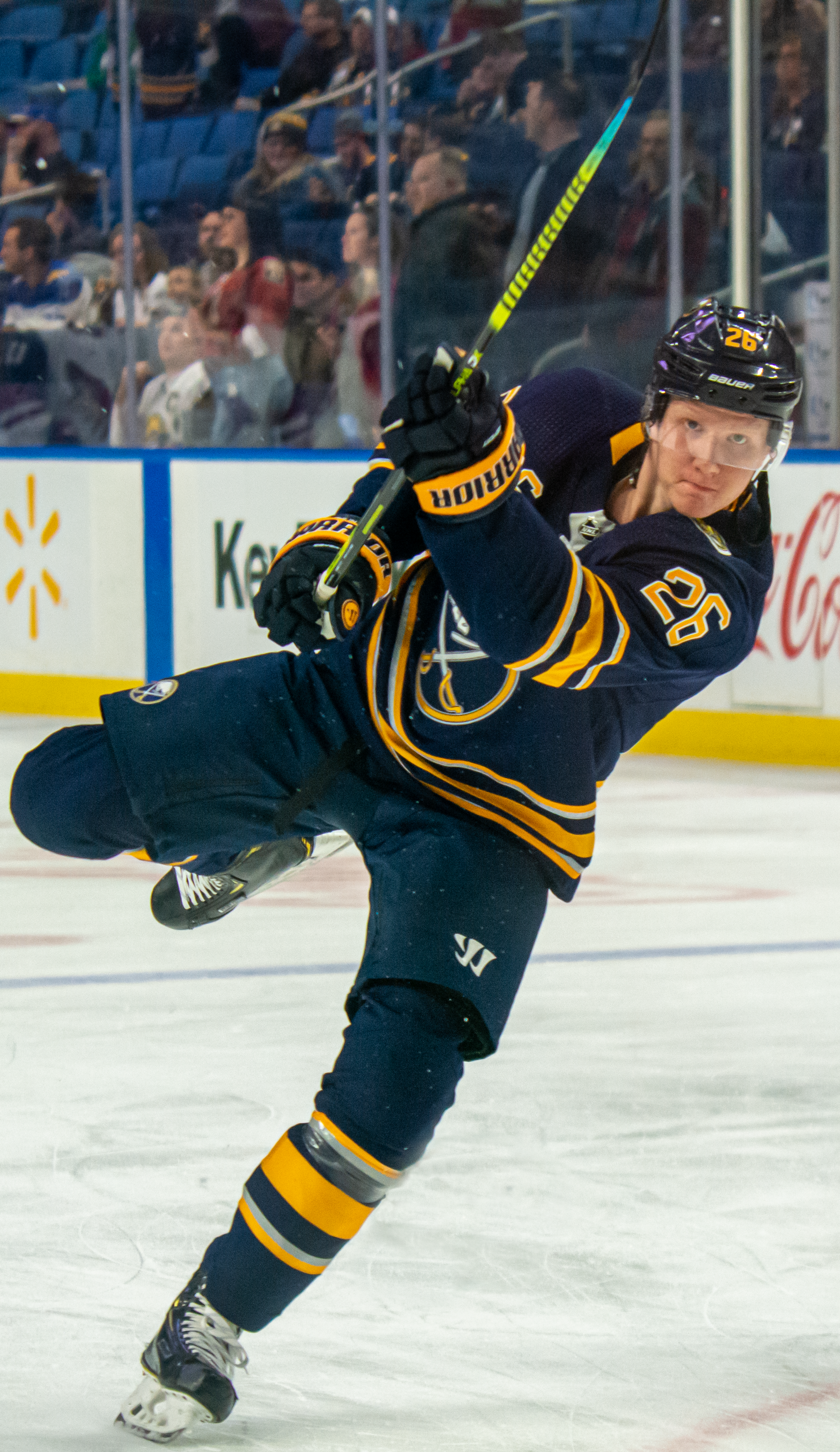
- Dahlin with the Buffalo Sabres in 2019
- Born: 13 April 2000 (age 26) Trollhättan, Sweden
- Height: 6 ft 3 in (191 cm)
- Weight: 204 lb (93 kg; 14 st 8 lb)
- Position: Defence
- Shoots: Left
- NHL team Former teams: Buffalo Sabres; Frölunda HC
- National team: Sweden
- NHL draft: 1st overall, 2018; Buffalo Sabres
- Playing career: 2016–present

Rasmus Erik Dahlin (Swedish: [ˈrǎsːmus da'li:n]; born 13 April 2000) is a Swedish professional ice hockey player who is a defenceman and captain for the Buffalo Sabres of the National Hockey League (NHL). Having been referred to as the most talented player available in the 2018 NHL entry draft class, Dahlin was selected first overall in the draft by the Sabres.

== Playing career ==
In the 2016–17 season, Dahlin scored his first Swedish Hockey League (SHL) goal with Frölunda HC on 12 November 2016 in a game against Karlskrona HK.

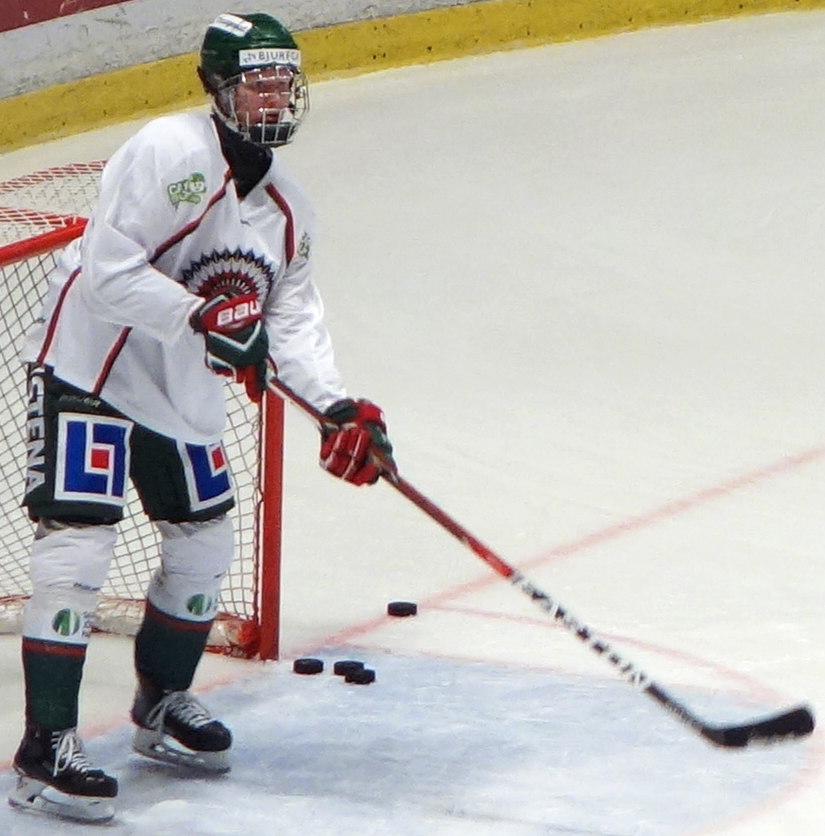
Dahlin with Frölunda HC in 2018.

Leading up to the 2018 NHL entry draft, Dahlin was widely considered the top prospect. He was described as a smart two-way defenceman with a great set of tools, including skating, puck handling, vision, intelligence and shot. Dan Marr of the NHL Central Scouting Bureau described him as an exceptionally talented prospect that would be able to impact his team's fortune in a way similar to his countrymen Erik Karlsson and Victor Hedman.

On 22 June 2018, Dahlin was drafted first overall by the Buffalo Sabres. He was the first Swedish player to be drafted first overall since Mats Sundin in 1989, and the second Swede overall to accomplish the feat. On 9 July, he signed a three-year, entry-level contract with the Sabres. Dahlin participated at the Sabres' training camp and made the opening night roster for the 2018–19 season. He made his NHL debut on 4 October in a 4–0 loss to the Boston Bruins. Dahlin recorded his first career NHL goal on 13 October in a 3–0 win over the Arizona Coyotes. On 9 February 2019, after a win over the Detroit Red Wings, Dahlin became the fifth defenceman in NHL history to record 30 points before age 19. Following his rookie season, Dahlin was named as one of the three finalists for the Calder Memorial Trophy as the top rookie in the NHL.

On 22 September 2021, Dahlin signed a three-year, $18 million contract with the Sabres. He enjoyed a breakout 2021–22 season, posting new career highs in goals, assists and points and was named to the 2022 NHL All-Star Game.

Dahlin opened the 2022–23 season by setting an NHL record for goals by a defenceman in consecutive opening games at four. Dahlin was later named to his second consecutive All-Star Game, replacing injured teammate Tage Thompson.

On 9 October 2023, Dahlin signed an eight-year, $88 million contract extension with the Sabres.

Dahlin was named captain of the Sabres on 26 September 2024, succeeding Kyle Okposo.

On 27 January 2026, Dahlin scored his first career hat-trick in a 7–4 win over the Toronto Maple Leafs. During the 2025–26 season, Dahlin posted a new career high with 74 points, including 52 even strength points, which set a record for a Sabres defenceman. Following the season, he was a finalist for the James Norris Memorial Trophy and the Bill Masterton Memorial Trophy. The Sabres won an Atlantic Division title in the 2025–26 season, which ended a 14-season playoff drought that was the longest playoff drought in NHL history.

== International play ==
Medal record

Men's ice hockey

Representing Sweden

World Championships
Bronze medal – third place	2024 Czech Republic	

At age 16, Dahlin was the youngest player to ever dress for Sweden at the World Junior Championships, and the youngest player overall in the 2017 World Junior Championships. Dahlin later competed in the 2018 World Junior Championships, recording six assists and helping lead the team to win silver. He was named the tournament's top defenceman after scoring the second-most points amongst tournament defencemen. After Dahlin and several other teammates removed their silver medals after receiving them during the medal ceremony, he was suspended for the first two games of the 2019 World Junior Championships.

Dahlin represented the Sweden senior team at the 2018 Winter Olympics, becoming the youngest player to compete in the 2018 tournament, and the youngest to compete in the men's tournament since 1984.

He represented Sweden at the 2024 World Championship and won a bronze medal.

== Personal life ==
Dahlin is engaged to Carolina Matovac. While Dahlin and Matovac were vacationing in France during the summer of 2025, Matovac suffered major heart failure while she was pregnant. Due to her heart failure, Matovac required multiple instances of CPR, spent multiple weeks in a hospital on life support and received a heart transplant; she also suffered a miscarriage.

== Career statistics ==
=== Regular season and playoffs ===
			Regular season					Playoffs
Season	Team	League	GP	G	A	Pts	PIM	GP	G	A	Pts	PIM
2014–15	HC Lidköping	Div.3	10	1	5	6	0	—	—	—	—	—
2015–16	Frölunda HC	J20	1	0	0	0	0	—	—	—	—	—
2016–17	Frölunda HC	J20	24	9	13	22	74	1	0	0	0	0
2016–17	Frölunda HC	SHL	26	1	2	3	6	14	3	2	5	2
2017–18	Frölunda HC	J20	1	1	1	2	0	—	—	—	—	—
2017–18	Frölunda HC	SHL	41	7	13	20	20	6	1	2	3	2
2018–19	Buffalo Sabres	NHL	82	9	35	44	34	—	—	—	—	—
2019–20	Buffalo Sabres	NHL	59	4	36	40	38	—	—	—	—	—
2020–21	Buffalo Sabres	NHL	56	5	18	23	26	—	—	—	—	—
2021–22	Buffalo Sabres	NHL	80	13	40	53	68	—	—	—	—	—
2022–23	Buffalo Sabres	NHL	78	15	58	73	92	—	—	—	—	—
2023–24	Buffalo Sabres	NHL	81	20	39	59	66	—	—	—	—	—
2024–25	Buffalo Sabres	NHL	73	17	51	68	54	—	—	—	—	—
2025–26	Buffalo Sabres	NHL	77	19	55	74	76	13	4	10	14	20
SHL totals			67	8	15	23	26	20	4	4	8	4
NHL totals			586	102	332	434	454	13	4	10	14	20

=== International ===
Year	Team	Event	Result	GP	G	A	Pts	PIM
2016	Sweden	IH18	4th	5	1	1	2	2
2017	Sweden	WJC	4th	7	1	1	2	4
2018	Sweden	WJC	2nd place, silver medalist(s)	7	0	6	6	6
2018	Sweden	OG	5th	2	0	1	1	0
2022	Sweden	WC	6th	8	2	5	7	4
2024	Sweden	WC	3rd place, bronze medalist(s)	10	2	7	9	29
2025	Sweden	4NF	3rd	3	1	0	1	0
2026	Sweden	OG	7th	5	1	4	5	2
Junior totals				19	2	8	10	12
Senior totals				28	6	17	23	35

== Awards and honours ==
Award	Year	Ref
CHL
Champion	2017	
NHL
NHL Rookie of the Month	November 2018	
NHL All-Rookie Team	2019	
NHL All-Star Game	2022, 2023, 2024	
NHL Second All-Star Team	2026	

Awards and achievements
Preceded by Nico Hischier	NHL first overall draft pick 2018	Succeeded by Jack Hughes
Preceded by Casey Mittelstadt	Buffalo Sabres first-round draft pick 2018	Succeeded by Dylan Cozens
Sporting positions
Preceded by Kyle Okposo	Buffalo Sabres captain 2024–present	Incumbent
