= Dylan Cozens =

Canadian ice hockey player (born 2001)

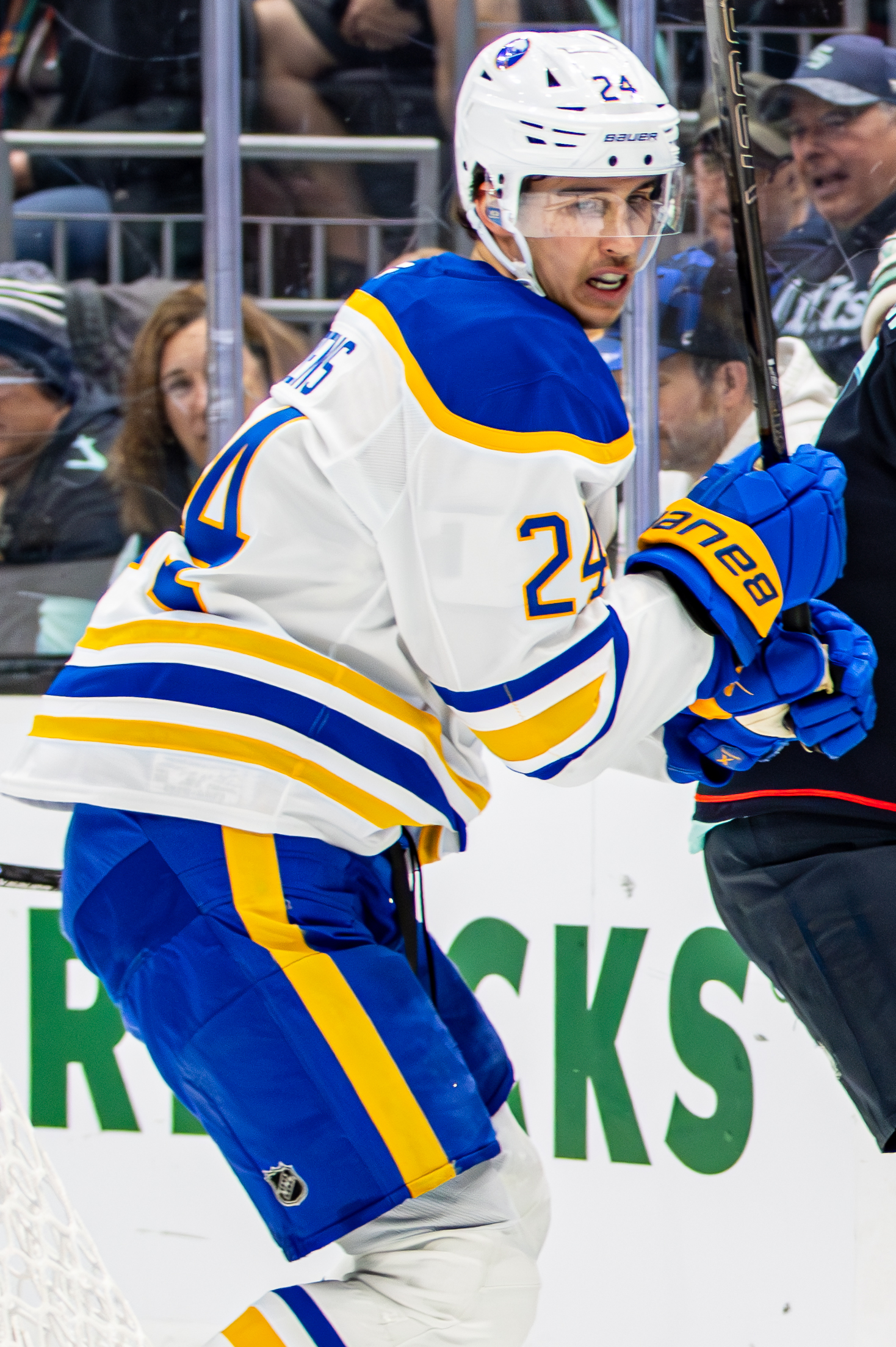
- Cozens with the Sabres in 2025
- Born: February 9, 2001 (age 25) Whitehorse, Yukon, Canada
- Height: 6 ft 3 in (191 cm)
- Weight: 205 lb (93 kg; 14 st 9 lb)
- Position: Centre
- Shoots: Right
- NHL team Former teams: Ottawa Senators; Buffalo Sabres
- National team: Canada
- NHL draft: 7th overall, 2019; Buffalo Sabres
- Playing career: 2021–present

Dylan Cozens (born February 9, 2001) is a Canadian professional ice hockey player who is a centre for the Ottawa Senators of the National Hockey League (NHL). Cozens was selected seventh overall in the 2019 NHL entry draft by the Buffalo Sabres. Nicknamed "The Workhorse from Whitehorse", he is the first player from the Yukon to be a first-round Western Hockey League (WHL) draft pick, a first-round NHL draft pick, and a member of the Canada men's national junior ice hockey team.

Born and raised in Whitehorse, Cozens began ice skating on a backyard rink when he was three years old. He often played against older opponents due to the limited pool of ice hockey players in his hometown, and after being injured by an adult player in a house league game, Cozens decided to move to British Columbia and play within his age group. After attending the Delta Hockey Academy, he was taken by the WHL's Lethbridge Hurricanes. After posting 22 goals and 53 points in his rookie junior ice hockey season, he received the Jim Piggott Memorial Trophy for the top first-year WHL player. He followed this performance with 84 points in 68 games the next season, and 85 points in 51 games before the COVID-19 pandemic ended the 2019–20 WHL season early. In his final WHL season, Cozens was a First Team All-Star and the runner-up for the Four Broncos Memorial Trophy.

Cozens joined the Sabres for the 2020–21 season, recording a point in his NHL debut. He battled several setbacks during his rookie season, including time in COVID-19 protocols and two upper-body injuries. The following season, Cozens, who had been playing on the wing as a rookie, moved back to his natural centre position after the departures of Sam Reinhart and Jack Eichel. In 2025, Cozens was traded to Ottawa at the trade deadline.

== Early life ==
Cozens was born on February 9, 2001, in Whitehorse, Yukon, to Mike Cozens and Sue Bogle. When he was three years old, Cozens' father built a backyard ice rink on which he learned how to skate and later play ice hockey. Because there were limited hockey players in Whitehorse, Cozens often played against older opponents; when he was 12, he broke his leg after being boarded by an adult man in a house league game. The incident convinced Cozens and his family to find teams within his age group outside of Whitehorse, and at the age of 14, Cozens moved to British Columbia to develop his skills at the Delta Hockey Academy. During Delta's 2015–16 season, Cozens scored 19 goals and 31 points in 25 regular season games, as well as five goals and six points in three postseason games. In January, Cozens participated in the 2016 John Reid Memorial Bantam Tournament with the Delta team. He led all tournament players with nine goals and 15 points in six games and was named to the Reid Division All-Star Team. Outside of Delta, Cozens also spent time with the Prince George Cariboo Cougars of the BC Hockey Major Midget League to build his strength and skills in the minor ice hockey circuit.

== Playing career ==
=== Junior ===
The Lethbridge Hurricanes of the Western Hockey League (WHL) selected Cozens in the first round, 19th overall, of the 2016 WHL bantam draft. It was the first time that a Yukon-born player had been selected in the first round of the WHL draft. He signed with the team that May, but because he was below the WHL's age minimum for the upcoming 2016–17 season, he played for the Yale Hockey Academy in Abbotsford, British Columbia, instead. He scored his first junior ice hockey goal in his WHL debut, a 5–3 loss to the Saskatoon Blades on November 13, 2016. After three games, he returned to Yale, where his 57 points (27 goals and 30 assists) in 30 games were tied for the CSSHL Midget Prep league lead. Cozens added another two goals and four points in three CSSHL playoff games, and once the Yale season ended, he rejoined Lethbridge for the WHL postseason. There, he had three goals and eight points in 12 playoff games before the Hurricanes were eliminated by the Regina Pats in the Eastern Conference Championship series.

Cozens returned to the Hurricanes for a full rookie season in 2017–18. After recording 13 points in as many games, including a five-game point streak and a three-point game against the Medicine Hat Tigers, he was named the WHL Rookie of the Month for October 2017. Cozens recorded his first WHL hat-trick on January 13, leading Lethbridge to a 5–2 victory over the Kootenay Ice. That performance, combined with three goals and six points in a two-game series against the Red Deer Rebels, earned Cozens WHL Player of the Week honours for the week ending January 14. In his first full season of junior ice hockey, Cozens posted 22 goals and 53 points in 57 regular-season games, and he received the Jim Piggott Memorial Trophy as the top rookie in the WHL. The Hurricanes faced the Rebels in the first round of 2018 WHL playoffs, and Cozens recorded his first postseason hat-trick in the second game of the series. Although the Hurricanes lost to the Swift Current Broncos in the WHL Eastern Conference Championship series, Cozens was named the WHL Rookie of the Month for April 2018 after recording seven goals and 13 points in 16 playoff games. Cozens was a finalist for the CHL Rookie of the Year award at the end of the season, a title that ultimately went to Alexis Lafrenière of the Rimouski Océanic.

At the start of the 2018–19 season, the NHL Central Scouting Bureau ranked Cozens, who had five goals and ten points in four games, an "A"-level prospect. His 14 points in 10 games led Lethbridge in scoring, and Cozens was one of three Lethbridge players to represent Team WHL at the 2018 CHL Canada/Russia Series. On November 23, Cozens recorded the first six-point game of his junior hockey career, scoring a hat-trick and recording an additional three assists in Lethbridge's 8–4 victory over the Brandon Wheat Kings. In January, Cozens was appointed the captain of Team Cherry at the 2019 CHL/NHL Top Prospects Game. Cozens finished his sophomore junior hockey season with 34 goals and 84 points in 68 regular-season games, and the NHL Central Scouting Bureau ranked him the No. 5 prospect among all North American skaters. He added an additional four goals and eight points in seven playoff games, but the Calgary Hitmen eliminated the Hurricanes in a winner-takes-all game seven of their opening-round playoff series. On June 21, the Buffalo Sabres of the National Hockey League (NHL) selected Cozens seventh overall in the 2019 NHL entry draft. He was the first Yukon-born player ever taken in the first round of the NHL draft.

Cozens signed a three-year, entry-level contract with the Sabres on July 15, 2019. After attending Buffalo's training camp, Cozens returned to Lethbridge for the 2019–20 season. He was named the WHL Player of the Week for the second week of the season after posting six points and a +2 plus–minus rating in two games against the Rebels and the Edmonton Oil Kings. After recording 10 goals and 17 points through the first 13 games of the season, Cozens was named an alternate captain for Team WHL at the 2019 Canada/Russia Series. Cozens told reporters that he wanted to "stay at an NHL level" during the Hurricanes' season, and by December 11, he led the team with 42 points (19 goals and 23 assists) in 28 games. Halfway through the season, Cozens and Ty Prefontaine were named co-captains for the Hurricanes. By the time that concerns surrounding the COVID-19 pandemic forced the WHL to indefinitely postpone the 2019–20 season, Cozens led Lethbridge with 38 goals and 85 points in 51 games. Cozens was named to the WHL Eastern Conference First All-Star Team at the end of the season, and he was the runner-up for the Four Broncos Memorial Trophy, an award which went to Adam Beckman of the Spokane Chiefs. Cozens finished his WHL career with 95 goals and 223 points in 179 regular-season games, as well as 14 goals and 29 points in 35 postseason games.

=== Professional ===
==== Buffalo Sabres (2021–2025) ====
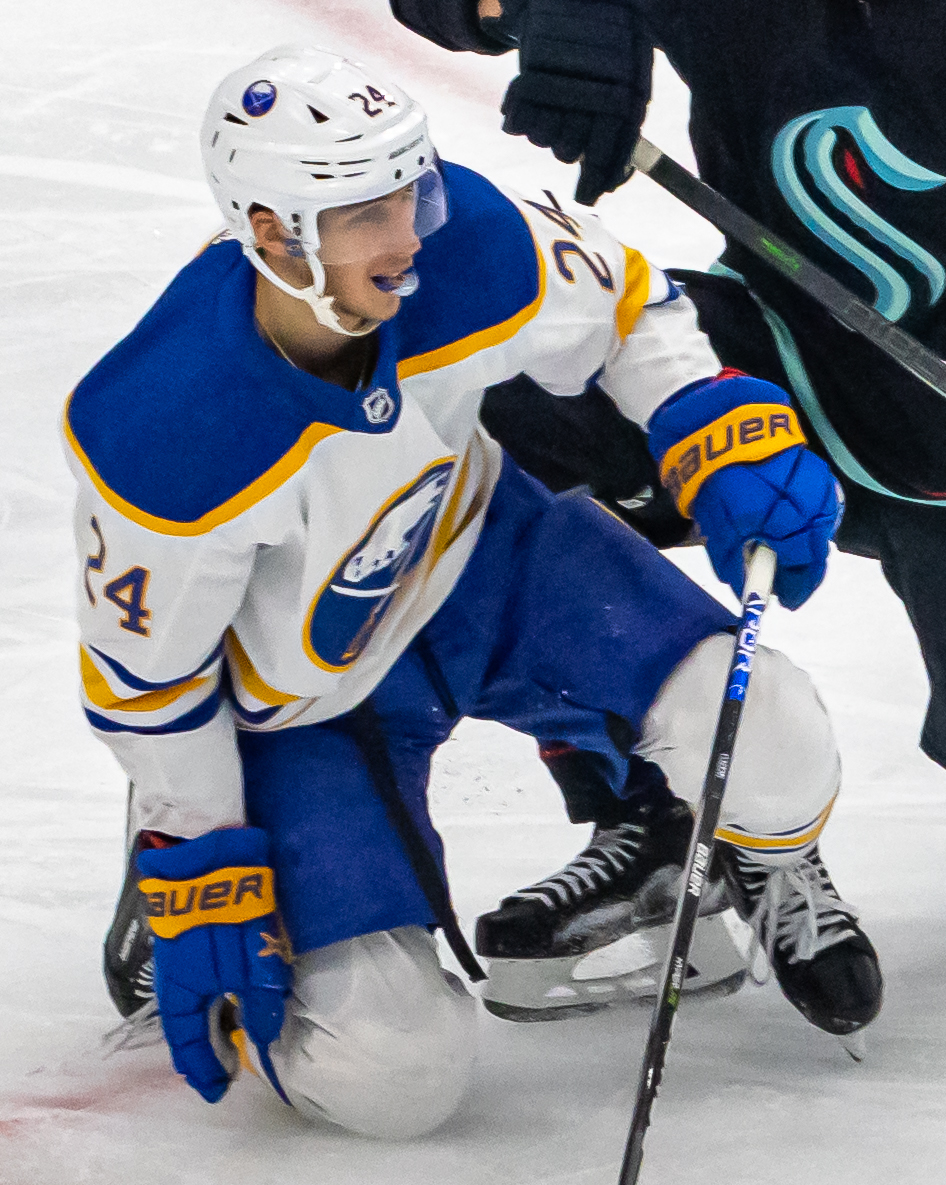
Cozens with the Sabres in 2022

Cozens joined the Sabres for the 2020–21 season, making his NHL debut on January 14, 2021. Although Buffalo lost the game 6–4 to the Washington Capitals, Cozens recorded his first NHL point with an assist on Tobias Rieder's second-period goal. He scored his first goal on January 22, also against the Capitals. Although Cozens's goal tied the game 2–2, Washington ultimately won the game 4–3 in a shootout. In February, Cozens was one of several Buffalo skaters to miss time in COVID-19 protocols. Drafted as a centre, Cozens spent most of his rookie NHL season on the wing, only returning to the centre to fill in for an injured Jack Eichel in March. Cozens suffered additional setbacks with two separate upper body injuries: after missing four games at the beginning of March, he sat out an additional six games following a hard check from Philippe Myers of the Philadelphia Flyers on March 29. He had a strong April, assisting seven times in an eight-game span, and finished his rookie NHL season with four goals and 13 points in 41 games.

With Sam Reinhart's offseason departure and Eichel indefinitely sidelined due to a dispute with the Sabres' front office, an opportunity opened for Cozens to become a top-six centre for Buffalo during the 2021–22 season. He recorded the first multi-goal game of his career on November 12, scoring twice in a 3–2 win over the Edmonton Oilers. Cozens entered an extended slump in the stretch of the season, going without a goal between February 25 and April 5. He finally broke the drought after 17 games with a power play goal in Buffalo's 4–2 win against the Carolina Hurricanes. Cozens finished his first full NHL season with 13 goals and 38 points in 79 games. All but two of those goals came before the midseason NHL All-Star Game break. Cozens told reporters after the season that when his offensive production faltered, he switched his focus to improving his defence.

On February 7, 2023, the Sabres signed Cozens to a seven-year contract extension worth $49.7 million.

==== Ottawa Senators (2025–present) ====
On March 7, 2025, the Sabres traded Cozens, Dennis Gilbert, and a second-round pick in the 2026 NHL entry draft to the Ottawa Senators in exchange for Josh Norris and Jacob Bernard-Docker. Playing on a line with Drake Batherson and David Perron, Cozens made an immediate impact with the Senators, recording three goals and seven points in his first eight games. He recorded his 200th career point on March 11, with a goal in Ottawa's 5–2 victory over the Philadelphia Flyers. In 21 regular season games with the Senators, Cozens recorded five goals and 16 points. Cozens made his postseason debut in the first round of the 2025 Stanley Cup playoffs, recording a goal and an assist in six games against the Toronto Maple Leafs.

Going into the 2025–26 season, Cozens spent two months working with Sam Gagner, the Senators' director of player development. Despite posting 10 points in the first 11 games of the season, Cozens struggled defensively, with a –10 plus–minus. He recorded two three-point games in December, one on December 11 in a 6–3 victory over the Columbus Blue Jackets and then again on December 21, in a 6–2 win over the Boston Bruins. He tallied another three-point game on January 14, 2026, in an 8–4 victory over the New York Rangers. Cozens scored his 100th NHL goal on January 31, in a 4–1 win against the New Jersey Devils. At the end of February on February 28, Cozens added another three-point night, scoring twice and assisting on another in a 5–2 victory over the Toronto Maple Leafs. The Senators made the playoffs again, but were swept in the first round by the Carolina Hurricanes. Cozens registered two goals in the four games.

== International play ==
Medal record

Representing Canada

Ice hockey

World Championships
Silver medal – second place	2022 Finland	

World Junior Championships
Gold medal – first place	2020 Czech Republic	
Silver medal – second place	2021 Canada	

Hlinka Gretzky Cup
Gold medal – first place	2018 Alberta	

World U-17 Hockey Challenge
Silver medal – second place	2017 British Columbia	

Cozens made his first international tournament appearance at the 2017 World U-17 Hockey Challenge in British Columbia. He captured a silver medal with Canada Red, who lost the championship final 6–4 to the United States team, and put up seven points in the tournament, tying the team high. The following year, Cozens served as an alternate captain for the Canadian under-18 team at the 2018 Hlinka Gretzky Cup in Alberta. He scored a controversial goal in the semifinals, tying the Canada-USA game with 0.00 left on the clock to take the match into overtime, where Canada won 6–5 to eliminate Team USA. No video replay was available to replay the goal, and the victory stood. Cozens and Team Canada took gold in the tournament, with Cozens scoring four goals and nine points over the course of the Cup. Cozens finished his under-18 tournament career as an alternate captain for Team Canada at the 2019 IIHF World U18 Championships in Sweden. Canada failed to medal in the tournament, losing 5–2 to the United States in the third-place match. Cozens had four goals and nine points in seven games, tied for eighth among all tournament participants.

Following his under-18 career, Cozens became the first Yukon player to represent the Canada men's national junior ice hockey team when he joined them for the 2020 World Junior Ice Hockey Championships in the Czech Republic. He scored two goals and seven assists in seven World Junior games, winning a gold medal when Canada defeated Russia 4–3 in the championship match. Cozens was originally named an alternate captain for Team Canada at the 2021 World Junior Ice Hockey Championships, but after captain Kirby Dach suffered a wrist injury, he and Bowen Byram were promoted to co-captains. He had eight goals and 16 assists, second among all participants, and was named to the tournament all-star team, while Canada took silver after a 2–0 shutout loss to the United States.

Cozens made his senior national team debut at the 2022 IIHF World Championship in Finland. Despite never playing left wing before the tournament, Cozens was placed on the top line with Pierre-Luc Dubois, and he was third in tournament scoring with seven goals and 13 points in 10 games. Cozens and Team Canada took silver in the tournament, losing the championship game 4–3 to Finland in overtime. Following the end of the 2023–24 NHL season, with the Sabres not qualifying for the 2024 Stanley Cup playoffs, Cozens accepted an invitation to join Team Canada at the 2024 IIHF World Championship. Despite finishing in fourth place, Cozens was named to the tournament all-star team after recording nine goals and 11 points in 10 games.

== Career statistics ==
Career statistics derived from Elite Prospects.

=== Regular season and playoffs ===
			Regular season					Playoffs
Season	Team	League	GP	G	A	Pts	PIM	GP	G	A	Pts	PIM
2015–16	Cariboo Cougars	BCMML	2	1	1	2	0	—	—	—	—	—
2016–17	Lethbridge Hurricanes	WHL	3	1	0	1	0	12	3	5	8	0
2017–18	Lethbridge Hurricanes	WHL	57	22	31	53	20	16	7	6	13	14
2018–19	Lethbridge Hurricanes	WHL	68	34	50	84	30	7	4	4	8	2
2019–20	Lethbridge Hurricanes	WHL	51	38	47	85	38	—	—	—	—	—
2020–21	Buffalo Sabres	NHL	41	4	9	13	16	—	—	—	—	—
2021–22	Buffalo Sabres	NHL	79	13	25	38	55	—	—	—	—	—
2022–23	Buffalo Sabres	NHL	81	31	37	68	41	—	—	—	—	—
2023–24	Buffalo Sabres	NHL	79	18	29	47	42	—	—	—	—	—
2024–25	Buffalo Sabres	NHL	61	11	20	31	62	—	—	—	—	—
2024–25	Ottawa Senators	NHL	21	5	11	16	6	6	1	1	2	12
2025–26	Ottawa Senators	NHL	82	28	31	59	59	4	2	0	2	0
NHL totals			444	110	162	272	281	10	3	1	4	12

=== International ===
Year	Team	Event	Result	GP	G	A	Pts	PIM
2017	Canada Red	U17	2nd place, silver medalist(s)	6	1	6	7	0
2018	Canada	HG18	1st place, gold medalist(s)	5	2	3	5	0
2019	Canada	U18	4th	7	4	5	9	4
2020	Canada	WJC	1st place, gold medalist(s)	7	2	7	9	4
2021	Canada	WJC	2nd place, silver medalist(s)	7	8	8	16	6
2022	Canada	WC	2nd place, silver medalist(s)	10	7	6	13	2
2024	Canada	WC	4th	10	9	2	11	2
2026	Canada	WC	4th	10	4	3	7	0
Junior totals				32	17	29	46	14
Senior totals				30	20	11	31	4

== Awards and honours ==
Award	Year	Ref.
WHL
Jim Piggott Memorial Trophy	2018	
CHL Canada/Russia Series participant	2018, 2019	
CHL/NHL Top Prospects Game (Team Cherry captain)	2019	
Eastern Conference First All-Star Team	2020	
International
IIHF World Junior Championship Tournament All-Star Team	2021	
IIHF World Championship Media All-Star team	2024	

Awards and achievements
Preceded by Aleksi Heponiemi	Jim Piggott Memorial Trophy recipient 2018	Succeeded by Brayden Tracey
Preceded by Rasmus Dahlin	Buffalo Sabres first-round draft pick 2019	Succeeded by Ryan Johnson
