= Brandon Hagel =

Canadian ice hockey player (born 1998)

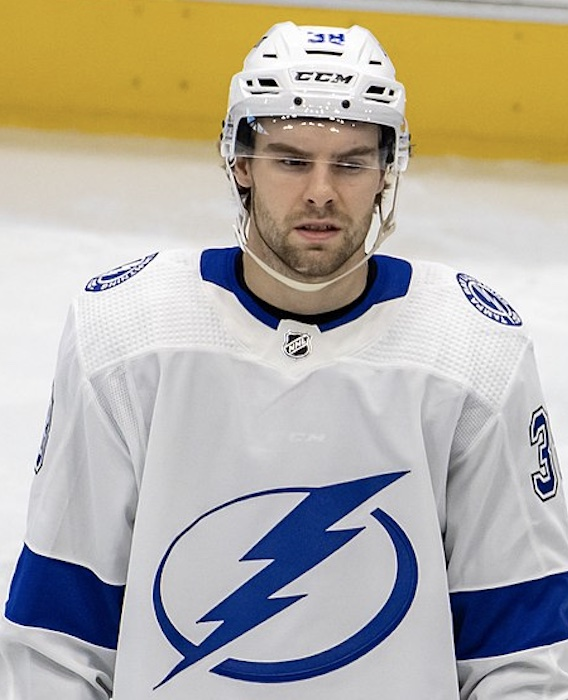
- Hagel with the Tampa Bay Lightning in January 2023
- Born: August 27, 1998 (age 28) Saskatoon, Saskatchewan, Canada
- Height: 6 ft 2 in (188 cm)
- Weight: 179 lb (81 kg; 12 st 11 lb)
- Position: Left wing
- Shoots: Left
- NHL team Former teams: Tampa Bay Lightning; Chicago Blackhawks
- National team: Canada
- NHL draft: 159th overall, 2016; Buffalo Sabres
- Playing career: 2020–present

Brandon Hagel (born August 27, 1998) is a Canadian professional ice hockey player who is a left winger for the Tampa Bay Lightning of the National Hockey League (NHL). He was selected 159th overall by the Buffalo Sabres in the 2016 NHL entry draft, but did not sign with the team. Hagel made his NHL debut with the Chicago Blackhawks in March 2020, following a junior career with the Red Deer Rebels of the Western Hockey League (WHL), where he set a franchise record for most assists. He has since played in the NHL and has represented Canada internationally, winning gold medals at both the 2021 World Championship and the 4 Nations Face-Off in 2025.

== Playing career ==
Hagel began his Bantam and Midget AAA ice hockey career with the Fort Saskatchewan Rangers in the Alberta Midget Hockey League (AMHL). Despite recording 41 points in 33 games during the 2012–13 AMHL season, he was overlooked in the 2013 Western Hockey League (WHL) Bantam draft. Following this, he finished third in the AMHL in points and was named to the Second All-Star Team. He finished his Bantam and Midget career playing with the Whitecourt Wolverines and recording one goal and two assists in two games.

=== Major junior ===
On September 17, 2015, Hagel was signed as a free agent by the Red Deer Rebels in the Western Hockey League. In his rookie season with the team, he helped lead them to the 2016 Memorial Cup against the London Knights and earned a final ranking of 104th overall by the NHL Central Scouting Bureau. In an interview, Hagel attributed much of his success to head coach and general manager Brent Sutter, saying "having Brent as a coach, he pushes you every night. You have to get into the hard areas and the dirty areas for success to come...That’s what has sunk in is that for success to come, those things have to happen first. When those happen, success is going to come." Hagel was eventually selected 159th overall by the Buffalo Sabres in the 2016 NHL entry draft.

Prior to the 2017–18 season, Hagel participated in both the Rebels' and Sabres' training camps. During a scrimmage with the Rebels, Hagel suffered a knee injury and was expected to be returned to the WHL to complete the season. Despite this, he was named an alternate captain and recorded three goals and two assists in back-to-back games against the Edmonton Oil Kings. Although he was healthy to begin the season, Hagel experienced an upper body injury and missed six weeks to recover.

By June 1, 2018, the Sabres had not signed Hagel to a contract and relinquished their rights to him, allowing him to become eligible for the 2018 NHL entry draft. He was subsequently invited to the Montreal Canadiens training camp on a tryout basis but began the 2018–19 season with the Rebels. After recording 30 points in 19 games, he signed a three-year, entry-level contract with the Chicago Blackhawks worth $925,000. He continued his success through his final season in the WHL, where he set a new franchise record for most assists and was selected for the WHL Eastern Conference Second All-Star Team. Hagel surpassed Arron Asham's 161 former franchise assist record on February 9, 2019, in a game against the Moose Jaw Warriors. On March 1, 2019, Hagel scored his 100th WHL point and 38th goal of the season in a 4–7 loss to the Medicine Hat Tigers.

=== Professional ===
==== Chicago Blackhawks ====
After the Rebels were knocked out of the 2019 WHL playoffs, Hagel joined the Blackhawks' American Hockey League (AHL) affiliate, the Rockford IceHogs, for eight games and recorded one point. He attended the Blackhawks' training camp before the 2018–19 NHL season but was assigned to the Rockford IceHogs to begin the 2018–19 AHL season. Hagel made his NHL debut on March 11, 2020, the day before the NHL season was postponed due to COVID-19.

As a black ace in the Blackhawks' first-round playoff exit, Hagel did not feature in a game. With the 2020–21 season being postponed, Hagel was loaned to a second tier Swiss League club, HC Thurgau, on September 30, 2020.

As a restricted free agent with the Blackhawks following his 2020–21 season, Hagel was resigned to a three-year, $4.5 million contract extension on August 6, 2021.

==== Tampa Bay Lightning ====
In his third season with the Blackhawks, Hagel had already established new career highs with 21 goals and 16 assists for 37 points through 55 games. With Chicago out of playoff contention, the team traded Hagel alongside two fourth-round picks to the Tampa Bay Lightning in exchange for Taylor Raddysh, Boris Katchouk, and two first-round picks in 2023 (Oliver Moore) and 2024 (Sacha Boisvert).

Hagel played the remainder of the 2021–22 season with the Lightning, recording four goals and three assists for a total of seven points through 22 games as the two-time defending Stanley Cup champion Lightning finished the season as the fifth seed on the East. During the 2022 playoffs, he posted two goals and four assists for six points with the Lightning en route to a third straight appearance in the Stanley Cup Final, in which they were defeated by the top-seeded Colorado Avalanche in six games.

In his first full season with the Lightning in 2022–23, Hagel achieved career highs in both points and goals, with 30 goals and 34 assists for 64 points in 81 games. He set a new career high in each category and finished fourth on the team in points and the Lightning as a team finished sixth in the East. In the 2023 playoffs, he posted a goal and four assists for five points in a six-game first-round exit to their Atlantic Division rival, the third-seeded Toronto Maple Leafs.

Before the 2023–24 season, Hagel and the Lightning agreed to an 8-year contract extension worth $52 million. Hagel had another career-best season with 75 points across 82 regular season games. In the 2024 playoffs, he registered three goals and two assists for five points in all five games in Tampa Bay's first-round exit to the second-seeded and eventual Stanley Cup champion Florida Panthers.

Hagel recorded 35 goals and 55 assists for a career-high of 90 points in the 2024–25 season. He finished second on the team in points, behind Art Ross Trophy winner Nikita Kucherov. In February, Hagel was named the NHL's first star of the week after recording a league-high four goals and four assists. In Tampa Bay's first round playoff exit, Hagel received a one-game suspension for a hit that sent Florida Panthers' captain Aleksander Barkov to the locker room in Game 2 of the series. When Hagel returned in Game 4, Florida's alternate captain Aaron Ekblad struck Hagel in the head, taking him out of the game. The team's medical staff confirmed Hagel suffered a concussion from the hit, officially ending his season. The hit sparked controversy as Ekblad was only penalized after the game and went on to score an equalizing goal.

== International play ==
Medal record

Representing Canada

Ice hockey

Olympic Games
Silver medal – second place	2026 Milano Cortina	

World Championships
Gold medal – first place	2021 Latvia	

4 Nations Face-Off
Winner	2025 Canada/United States	

Hagel's success in the 2020–21 NHL season saw him earn his first invitation to represent Canada internationally, joining the senior national team for the 2021 IIHF World Championship. He called the opportunity "something special." He did not register a point in the course of the tournament, which saw Team Canada lose its first three games before rallying to make a deep run to the championship game, where they defeated Finland for the gold medal.

Following the Tampa Bay Lightning's ouster in the first round of the 2024 Stanley Cup playoffs, Hagel again joined Team Canada for the 2024 IIHF World Championship.

In December 2024, it was announced that Hagel would be a part of Canada's 23-player roster for the 2025 4 Nations Face-Off, which replaced the 2025 NHL All-Star Game. Notably, in a game against the United States, Brandon Hagel and Matthew Tkachuk began to fight immediately following the opening puck drop. This started a series of brawls, with play stopped three separate times due to fighting in the first nine seconds. Team Canada and Hagel won the tournament after eliminating the United States in the final with a 3–2 overtime victory.

On December 31, 2025, he was named to Canada's roster to compete at the 2026 Winter Olympics.

== Career statistics ==
=== Regular season and playoffs ===
			Regular season					Playoffs
Season	Team	League	GP	G	A	Pts	PIM	GP	G	A	Pts	PIM
2014–15	Whitecourt Wolverines	AJHL	6	1	1	2	0	4	0	1	1	0
2015–16	Whitecourt Wolverines	AJHL	3	1	2	3	2	—	—	—	—	—
2015–16	Red Deer Rebels	WHL	72	13	34	47	46	17	1	9	10	18
2016–17	Red Deer Rebels	WHL	65	31	40	71	85	7	7	1	8	10
2017–18	Red Deer Rebels	WHL	56	18	41	59	45	5	5	1	6	16
2018–19	Red Deer Rebels	WHL	66	41	61	102	80	4	4	2	6	8
2018–19	Rockford IceHogs	AHL	8	0	1	1	2	—	—	—	—	—
2019–20	Rockford IceHogs	AHL	59	19	12	31	39	—	—	—	—	—
2019–20	Chicago Blackhawks	NHL	1	0	0	0	0	—	—	—	—	—
2020–21	HC Thurgau	SL	14	8	7	15	8	—	—	—	—	—
2020–21	Chicago Blackhawks	NHL	52	9	15	24	11	—	—	—	—	—
2021–22	Chicago Blackhawks	NHL	55	21	16	37	23	—	—	—	—	—
2021–22	Tampa Bay Lightning	NHL	22	4	3	7	8	23	2	4	6	25
2022–23	Tampa Bay Lightning	NHL	81	30	34	64	54	6	1	4	5	0
2023–24	Tampa Bay Lightning	NHL	82	26	49	75	79	5	3	2	5	2
2024–25	Tampa Bay Lightning	NHL	82	35	55	90	58	3	0	0	0	5
2025–26	Tampa Bay Lightning	NHL	71	36	38	74	58	7	6	2	8	13
NHL totals			446	161	210	371	291	44	12	12	24	45

=== International ===
Year	Team	Event	Result	GP	G	A	Pts	PIM
2021	Canada	WC	1st place, gold medalist(s)	10	0	0	0	0
2024	Canada	WC	4th	10	3	4	7	2
2025	Canada	4NF	1st place, gold medalist(s)	4	0	1	1	5
2026	Canada	OG	2nd place, silver medalist(s)	6	1	0	1	0
Senior totals				30	4	5	9	7

== Awards and honours ==
Award	Year	Ref
Juniors
AMHL Second All-Star team	2015	
WHL (East) Second All-Star team	2019	
NHL
NHL Second All-Star Team	2025	

== Records ==
Brandon Hagel currently holds the following NHL records:

- Most goals in a single season without scoring a power play goal (32 goals)
- Most assists in the first period of a game (4 assists)
- Fastest goal to start an outdoor game (11 seconds)

== Personal life ==
Hagel was born in Saskatoon, Saskatchewan, but was raised in Morinville, Alberta. He grew up idolizing Alexander Ovechkin, even decorating his childhood bedroom with an Ovechkin theme. His father was a sales manager in the roofing industry and his mother worked in insurance. He has two siblings, a brother, Tyler, and a sister, Chelsea. During his junior hockey career, Hagel considered stepping away from professional hockey. At the start of the 2018 Junior A season, he planned to pursue a college education and become a teacher if he did not receive an NHL contract by December of that year. He had already registered for classes when, in October 2018, he signed with the Chicago Blackhawks, marking the beginning of his professional hockey career.

Hagel is an advocate for mental health awareness, having lost three family members to suicide since 2017. Since joining the Tampa Bay Lightning, he has been an active participant in the NHL's Hockey Talks initiative.
