= Nick Paul =

Canadian ice hockey player (born 1995)

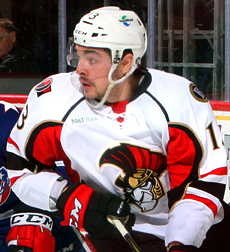
- Paul with the Binghamton Senators
- Born: March 20, 1995 (age 31) Mississauga, Ontario, Canada
- Height: 6 ft 3 in (191 cm)
- Weight: 223 lb (101 kg; 15 st 13 lb)
- Position: Forward
- Shoots: Left
- NHL team Former teams: Toronto Maple Leafs; Ottawa Senators; Tampa Bay Lightning
- National team: Canada
- NHL draft: 101st overall, 2013; Dallas Stars
- Playing career: 2015–present

Nicholas Paul (born March 20, 1995) is a Canadian professional ice hockey player who is a forward for the Toronto Maple Leafs of the National Hockey League (NHL). He was selected by the Dallas Stars in the fourth round, 101st overall, of the 2013 NHL entry draft. He has also played for the Tampa Bay Lightning and Ottawa Senators.

== Early life ==
Paul was born on March 20, 1995, in Mississauga, Ontario, to parents Ellwood and Melinda. He holds dual citizenship between Canada and the United States due to his mother being an American citizen of Puerto Rican and Mexican descent. Growing up, his father and half brother Christopher built a backyard rink for Paul and his older brother Jesse to use for practice. As a youth, Paul was friends with Max Domi and attended Toronto Maple Leafs games with him.

== Playing career ==
=== Junior ===
While growing up in Mississauga, Paul played minor midget hockey for the Mississauga Chargers of the Greater Toronto Hockey League (GTHL). During his 2011–12 season with the Chargers, Paul scored three goals and two assists for five points. While standing at only 5-foot-6 during his Ontario Hockey League (OHL) draft eligibility year, Paul tallied four goals and 25 points in 37 games. Despite failing to be drafted into the OHL in his first year of eligibility, Paul was later selected by the Brampton Battalion, (later the North Bay Battalion) as an overaged player. After his first season with the Battalion, where he scored 12 goals and 28 points, Paul was selected 101st overall by the Dallas Stars in the 2013 NHL entry draft.

Following the draft, Paul returned to the Battalion and continued his scoring prowess. By October 14, Paul led the team with five goals in eleven games. This continued throughout the season as he accumulated 37 goals and 29 assists through 58 regular-season games under coach Stan Butler. As such, he helped lead the team to the OHL's Eastern Conference Finals against the Oshawa Generals. Throughout the post-season, Paul maintained a four-game goal scoring streak and was tied for second in goal scoring with nine through 15 games. Following the playoffs, Paul's NHL rights were traded by the Stars on July 1, 2014, along with Alex Chiasson, Alex Guptill, and a 2015 second-round pick, to the Ottawa Senators in exchange for Jason Spezza and Ludwig Karlsson.

Paul re-joined the Battalion for his final season in the OHL during the 2014–15 season. By December, he had accumulated 19 goals and 34 points through 27 regular-season games and subsequently signed a three-year entry-level contract with the Senators on December 20, 2014. Upon joining the Senators for their 2015 development camp, he measured at 6 feet 4 inches (1.93 m) and 225 pounds (102 kg).

=== Professional ===
==== Ottawa Senators ====
Paul signed with Ottawa and made his professional debut with their American Hockey League (AHL) affiliate, the Binghamton Senators in the 2014–15 season. He finished with six goals and 11 assists in 45 games with Binghamton. Paul was assigned to Binghamton by Ottawa for the 2015–16 season also. Paul was called up in February 2016 and made his NHL debut on February 16, 2016, against the Buffalo Sabres. He recorded his first career NHL goal on February 24, 2016, in a 4–1 win over the Edmonton Oilers.

On July 16, 2018, Paul signed a one-year contract extension with the Senators.

On July 2, 2019, Paul re-signed with the Senators for another season. Paul struggled to break into Ottawa's lineup under coach Guy Boucher. At the end of the 2019 training camp, Paul was placed on waivers but went unclaimed and was assigned to the Senators AHL affiliate, the Belleville Senators. Paul became a regular NHL player during the 2019–20 season, setting a new high in games played in the NHL with 56.

After Erik Gudbranson was traded away by the Senators during the 2020–21 season, Paul was named an alternate captain. That season Paul established himself as one of the team's top penalty killers. Paul was named the Senators' nominee for the NHL's Bill Masterton Memorial Trophy at the end of the season.

During the 2021–22 season, Paul was used all over the lineup by coach D. J. Smith, slotting in wherever the coach needed a hole in the lineup filled. However, contract negotiations stalled with the Senators and Paul was made available for a trade by the organization.

==== Tampa Bay Lightning ====
On March 20, 2022, just a day before the trade deadline, Paul was traded by Ottawa to the Tampa Bay Lightning in exchange for Mathieu Joseph and a 2024 fourth-round draft pick. He scored his first goal as a Lightning on March 22 versus the Carolina Hurricanes. Paul made his Stanley Cup playoff debut in the first round series against the Toronto Maple Leafs. In the seventh game of series against the Maple Leafs, Paul scored his first two playoff goals, including the series winner. Paul helped the Lightning advance to the Stanley Cup Finals for their third successive season and contributed with 5 goals and 9 points through 23 games before losing to the Colorado Avalanche.

On July 1, 2022, Paul opted to forego free-agency in agreeing to a seven-year, $22.05 million contract extension to remain with the Lightning. Paul helped the Lightning to the playoffs again during the 2022–23 season. They faced the Maple Leafs in the first round again and with Toronto leading the series 3–1 and the Lightning facing elimination in Game 5, Paul scored the game-winning goal to keep the Lightning in the series. However, the Maple Leafs eliminated the Lightning in the following game.

==== Toronto Maple Leafs ====
On July 1, 2026, Paul was traded to the Toronto Maple Leafs in exchange for Dennis Hildeby, a 2027 fourth round draft pick, and a 2028 third round draft pick.

== International play ==
Medal record

Representing Canada

Ice hockey

World Junior Championships
Gold medal – first place	2015 Canada	

World Championships
Gold medal – first place	2021 Latvia	

Paul made his international debut for Canada with the national junior team at the 2015 World Junior Ice Hockey Championships. He finished the tournament with three goals in seven games to help Canada win a gold medal.

Paul was chosen to represent Team Canada again at the senior level for the 2021 IIHF World Championship. Paul scored at 6:26 of the first overtime in the gold medal game against Finland to give Canada its 21st all-time gold medal.

Following the Tampa Bay Lightning's ouster in the first round of the 2024 Stanley Cup playoffs, Paul again joined Team Canada for the 2024 IIHF World Championship.

== Career statistics ==
=== Regular season and playoffs ===
			Regular season					Playoffs
Season	Team	League	GP	G	A	Pts	PIM	GP	G	A	Pts	PIM
2011–12	Mississauga Chargers	OJHL	9	3	2	5	4	—	—	—	—	—
2012–13	Brampton Battalion	OHL	66	12	16	28	21	5	0	1	1	0
2013–14	North Bay Battalion	OHL	67	26	20	46	39	22	12	6	18	10
2014–15	North Bay Battalion	OHL	58	37	29	66	49	15	7	8	15	6
2015–16	Binghamton Senators	AHL	45	6	11	17	10	—	—	—	—	—
2015–16	Ottawa Senators	NHL	24	2	3	5	6	—	—	—	—	—
2016–17	Binghamton Senators	AHL	72	15	22	37	30	—	—	—	—	—
2016–17	Ottawa Senators	NHL	1	0	0	0	0	—	—	—	—	—
2017–18	Belleville Senators	AHL	54	14	13	27	40	—	—	—	—	—
2017–18	Ottawa Senators	NHL	11	1	0	1	0	—	—	—	—	—
2018–19	Belleville Senators	AHL	43	16	23	39	29	—	—	—	—	—
2018–19	Ottawa Senators	NHL	20	1	1	2	4	—	—	—	—	—
2019–20	Ottawa Senators	NHL	56	9	11	20	24	—	—	—	—	—
2019–20	Belleville Senators	AHL	3	1	3	4	0	—	—	—	—	—
2020–21	Ottawa Senators	NHL	56	5	15	20	19	—	—	—	—	—
2021–22	Ottawa Senators	NHL	59	11	7	18	22	—	—	—	—	—
2021–22	Tampa Bay Lightning	NHL	21	5	9	14	17	23	5	4	9	6
2022–23	Tampa Bay Lightning	NHL	80	17	15	32	33	6	1	0	1	2
2023–24	Tampa Bay Lightning	NHL	82	24	22	46	27	5	2	0	2	6
2024–25	Tampa Bay Lightning	NHL	76	22	19	41	30	5	2	0	2	2
2025–26	Tampa Bay Lightning	NHL	51	7	8	15	32	6	0	0	0	4
NHL totals			537	104	110	214	214	45	10	4	14	20

=== International ===
Year	Team	Event	Result	GP	G	A	Pts	PIM
2015	Canada	WJC	1st place, gold medalist(s)	7	3	0	3	2
2021	Canada	WC	1st place, gold medalist(s)	10	2	2	4	4
2024	Canada	WC	4th	10	3	3	6	4
Junior totals				7	3	0	3	2
Senior totals				20	5	5	10	8
