= Tomáš Kundrátek =

Czech ice hockey player (born 1989)

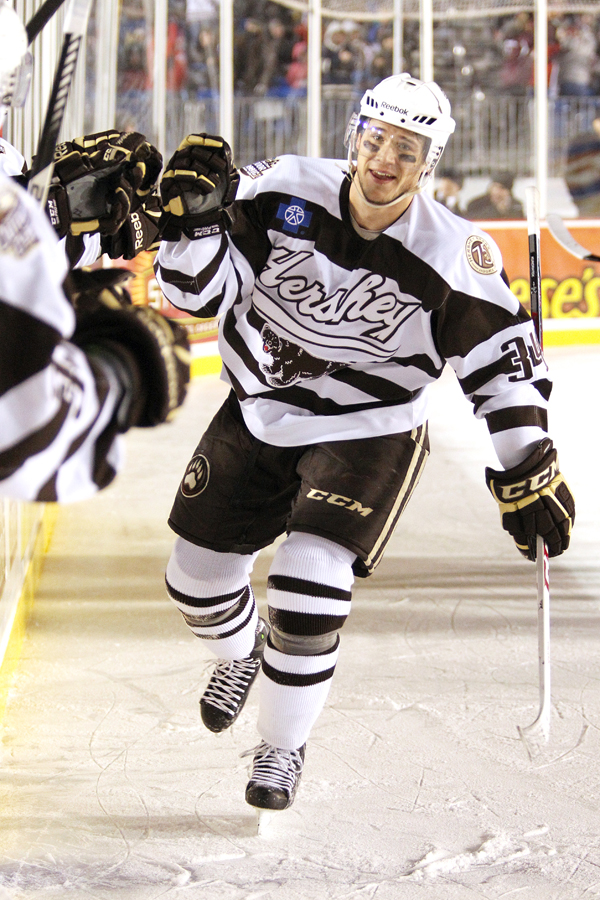
- Kundrátek with the Hershey Bears in 2013
- Born: December 26, 1989 (age 36) Přerov, Czechoslovakia
- Height: 6 ft 2 in (188 cm)
- Weight: 200 lb (91 kg; 14 st 4 lb)
- Position: Defence
- Shoots: Right
- ELH team Former teams: HC Oceláři Třinec; Washington Capitals; Dinamo Riga; HC Slovan Bratislava; Torpedo Nizhny Novgorod; Kunlun Red Star; HC Davos; HC Kometa Brno
- National team: Czech Republic
- NHL draft: 90th overall, 2008; New York Rangers
- Playing career: 2006–present

Tomáš Kundrátek (born December 26, 1989) is a Czech professional ice hockey player who is a defenceman for HC Oceláři Třinec of the Czech Extraliga (ELH). He has previously played in the National Hockey League (NHL) for the Washington Capitals.

== Playing career ==
Whilst playing as a youth and professionally with HC Oceláři Třinec in his native Czech Republic, He was selected 90th overall by the New York Rangers in the 2008 NHL entry draft, where he was the top-ranked Czech skater. Kundratek signed his first professional contract with the New York Rangers on August 25, 2008. The following season, intending to adapt to the North American style, Kundrátek joined the Medicine Hat Tigers of the Western Hockey League.

He skated in 70 games as a rookie for the Rangers AHL affiliate, the Connecticut Whale, during the 2010–11 season, registering two goals and ten assists for 12 points, along with 42 penalty minutes and an even plus/minus rating. He also skated in all six of the Whale's playoff games versus the Portland Pirates in the first round of the Calder Cup playoffs, earning two assists and two penalty minutes. He was traded by the Rangers to the Washington Capitals in exchange for Francois Bouchard on November 8, 2011.

During the 2011–12 season, Kundratek was recalled from AHL affiliate, the Hershey Bears, to Washington on January 10, 2012, and made his NHL debut the following night in a 1–0 win over the Pittsburgh Penguins. He played for five games before returning to Hershey to continue playing with the Bears on January 20, 2012. He didn't record any points while playing with the Capitals, but he did have two shots on goal, three hits, four blocked shots and 2 PIM.

In the lockout shortened 2012–13 season, having secured an opening night roster spot with the Capitals, he then scored his first NHL goal against the Boston Bruins on March 5, 2013.

On June 19, 2015, Kundratek left the Capitals organization and signed a one-year contract with Latvian Kontinental Hockey League club, Dinamo Riga.

== Personal life ==
In 2014, Kundrátek married Alannah Dzerdz from Medicine Hat, Alberta. They have two sons together, Hudson and Jagger.

== International play ==
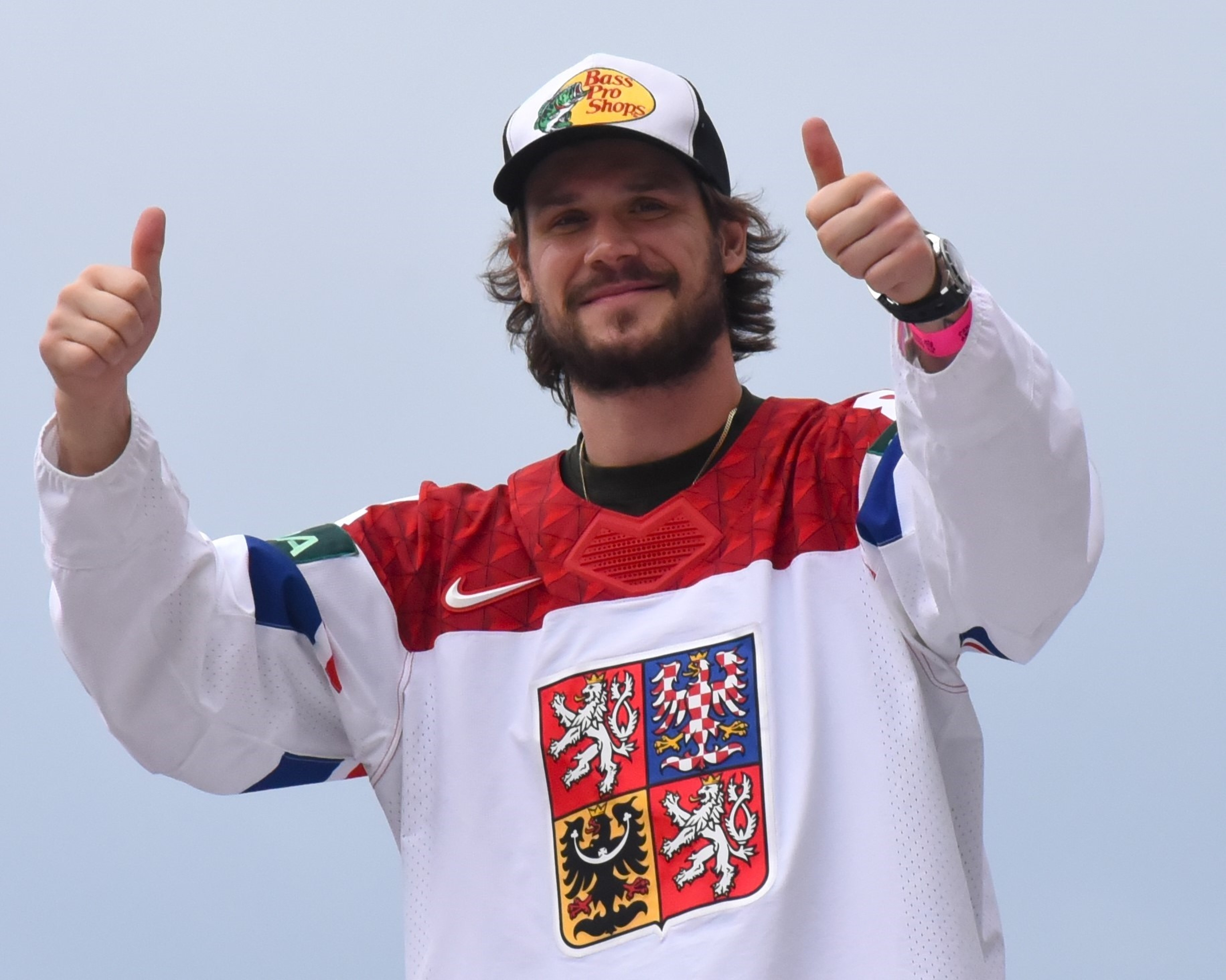
- Kundrátek in 2024

Medal record

Representing Czech Republic

World Championships
Gold medal – first place	2024 Czechia	
Bronze medal – third place	2022 Finland	

Kundrátek represented Czechia at the 2024 IIHF World Championship and won a gold medal.

== Career statistics ==
=== Regular season and playoffs ===
			Regular season					Playoffs
Season	Team	League	GP	G	A	Pts	PIM	GP	G	A	Pts	PIM
2003–04	HC Minor 2000 Přerov	CZE U18	6	0	0	0	0	—	—	—	—	—
2004–05	HC Minor 2000 Přerov	CZE U18	38	2	7	9	26	4	0	1	1	4
2005–06	HC Oceláři Třinec	CZE U18	39	5	13	18	96	2	0	1	1	10
2005–06	HC Oceláři Třinec	CZE U20	12	1	1	2	16	7	1	1	2	4
2006–07	HC Oceláři Třinec	CZE U20	33	4	13	17	93	3	1	1	2	10
2006–07	HC Oceláři Třinec	ELH	22	0	1	1	4	4	0	0	0	6
2007–08	HC Oceláři Třinec	CZE U20	14	3	6	9	28	—	—	—	—	—
2007–08	HC Oceláři Třinec	ELH	14	0	1	1	10	7	0	2	2	8
2007–08	HC Havířov Panthers	CZE.2	2	0	0	0	2	—	—	—	—	—
2007–08	HK Jestřábi Prostějov	CZE.2	16	1	0	1	12	—	—	—	—	—
2008–09	Medicine Hat Tigers	WHL	51	4	19	23	63	11	0	6	6	12
2008–09	Hartford Wolf Pack	AHL	—	—	—	—	—	1	0	0	0	0
2009–10	Medicine Hat Tigers	WHL	65	2	33	35	62	12	1	5	6	23
2010–11	Hartford Wolf Pack/CT Whale	AHL	70	2	10	12	42	6	0	2	2	2
2011–12	Connecticut Whale	AHL	7	0	2	2	2	—	—	—	—	—
2011–12	Hershey Bears	AHL	55	12	11	23	34	4	0	4	4	4
2011–12	Washington Capitals	NHL	5	0	0	0	2	—	—	—	—	—
2012–13	Hershey Bears	AHL	49	16	15	31	26	5	0	1	1	2
2012–13	Washington Capitals	NHL	25	1	6	7	8	—	—	—	—	—
2013–14	Hershey Bears	AHL	7	1	0	1	6	—	—	—	—	—
2014–15	Hershey Bears	AHL	59	5	22	27	28	—	—	—	—	—
2015–16	Dinamo Riga	KHL	40	2	11	13	37	—	—	—	—	—
2015–16	HC Slovan Bratislava	KHL	16	4	7	11	14	4	0	0	0	6
2016–17	HC Slovan Bratislava	KHL	39	8	5	13	20	—	—	—	—	—
2017–18	Torpedo Nizhny Novgorod	KHL	53	2	11	13	30	4	1	0	1	4
2018–19	Kunlun Red Star	KHL	25	0	3	3	10	—	—	—	—	—
2018–19	HC Oceláři Třinec	ELH	6	1	1	2	2	—	—	—	—	—
2018–19	HC Davos	NL	13	1	3	4	6	—	—	—	—	—
2019–20	HC Oceláři Třinec	ELH	34	3	7	10	14	—	—	—	—	—
2020–21	HC Oceláři Třinec	ELH	43	4	13	17	34	16	2	3	5	16
2021–22	HC Oceláři Třinec	ELH	47	9	17	26	28	14	1	5	6	4
2022–23	HC Kometa Brno	ELH	39	5	10	15	20	10	3	4	7	12
2023–24	HC Oceláři Třinec	ELH	51	7	12	19	18	21	1	11	12	23
2024–25	HC Oceláři Třinec	ELH	51	2	13	15	22	9	3	3	6	10
NHL totals			30	1	6	7	10	—	—	—	—	—
KHL totals			173	16	37	53	111	8	1	0	1	10

=== International ===
Year	Team	Event	Result	GP	G	A	Pts	PIM
2006	Czech Republic	U17	3rd place, bronze medalist(s)	5	0	1	1	4
2006	Czech Republic	IH18	5th	4	0
2007	Czech Republic	U18	9th	6	0	0	0	6
2008	Czech Republic	WJC	5th	6	1	0	1	2
2009	Czech Republic	WJC	6th	6	0	6	6	10
2016	Czech Republic	WC	5th	8	1	2	3	6
2016	Czech Republic	WCH	6th	1	0	0	0	0
2017	Czech Republic	WC	7th	8	0	2	2	2
2018	Czech Republic	OG	4th	5	1	0	1	0
2022	Czech Republic	OG	9th	4	1	1	2	2
2022	Czechia	WC	3rd place, bronze medalist(s)	10	1	3	4	4
2023	Czechia	WC	8th	8	0	1	1	4
2024	Czechia	WC	1st place, gold medalist(s)	10	1	3	4	0
2025	Czechia	WC	6th	5	0	0	0	2
2026	Czechia	OG	8th	4	0	0	0	0
Junior totals				23	1	7	8	22
Senior totals				63	5	12	17	20
