= Lukáš Dostál =

Czech ice hockey player (born 2000)

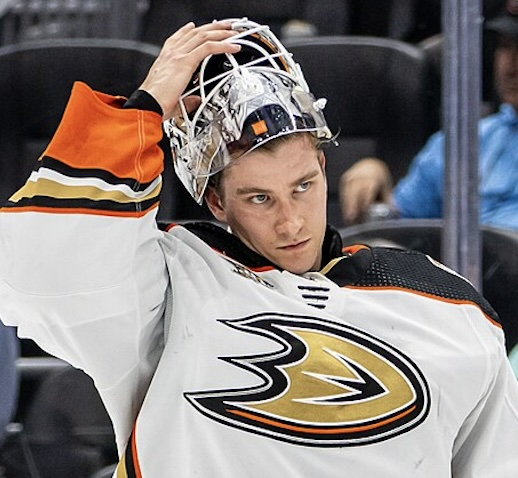
- Dostál with the Anaheim Ducks in 2024
- Born: 22 June 2000 (age 26) Brno, Czech Republic
- Height: 6 ft 2 in (188 cm)
- Weight: 190 lb (86 kg; 13 st 8 lb)
- Position: Goaltender
- Catches: Left
- NHL team Former teams: Anaheim Ducks; HC Kometa Brno; Ilves
- National team: Czech Republic
- NHL draft: 85th overall, 2018; Anaheim Ducks
- Playing career: 2017–present

Lukáš Dostál (born 22 June 2000) is a Czech professional ice hockey player who is a goaltender for the Anaheim Ducks of the National Hockey League (NHL). He was selected by the Ducks in the third round, 85th overall, of the 2018 NHL entry draft.

== Early life ==
Dostál was born on 22 June 2000 in Brno, Czech Republic, to parents Martin and Renata, but he is a native of Bedřichovice. He first began playing ice hockey at the age of six but became a goaltender later when his team lacked one.

== Playing career ==
Dostál signed with HC Kometa Brno youth setup in 2012 and played in their U16, U18 and U20 teams. He made his professional debut in 2017 with SK Horácká Slavia Třebíč of the second-tier WSM Liga (now Chance Liga).

Dostál entered the 2018 NHL entry draft as the number one ranked European prospect goaltender and was selected 85th overall by the Anaheim Ducks.

Dostál made his full debut for Kometa Brno's senior team during the 2017–18 Champions Hockey League and made his Czech Extraliga debut during the 2018–19 season before going out of a second loan spell with Slavia Třebíč. On 5 February 2019, Dostál under contract with Kometa until 2021, was loaned to the Liiga with Finnish club, Ilves. He appeared in 10 games, collecting four wins while recording a 1.80 goals against average.

On 14 May 2019, Dostál was signed to a three-year, entry-level contract with the Anaheim Ducks. However, after attending the Ducks' training camp, Dostál returned to Ilves in the Liiga for the 2019–20 SM-liiga season. During the season, Dostál earned 27 wins and ranked second in the league in goals against average with 1.78. As a result, he became the second Ilves player in Liiga history to be named the Liiga's Goaltender of the Year. The Ducks agreed to loan Dostál back to Ilves in the Liiga for the 2020–21 SM-liiga season, and he maintained a 10–1–0 record, a 1.64 goals against average, and a .940 save percentage to start the season. On 25 November 2020, it was announced that the Ducks had exercised their playing rights on Dostál and invited him officially join their organization and move to North America.

=== Anaheim Ducks ===
Due to the COVID-19 pandemic, the 2020–21 NHL season was delayed until 13 January 2021, and limited to 56 games. Dostál attended the Ducks' training camp in January but was reassigned to their American Hockey League affiliate, the San Diego Gulls, to start the season. Dostál immediately impacted the Gulls by winning his first three games with the team. By doing so at the age of 20, Dostál became the youngest goaltender in franchise history to win his first three starts, passing John Gibson by two years. During those three games, Dostál stopped 109 of 114 shots to maintain a .956 save percentage and 1.67 goals against average. He then became the first Gulls goaltender to win his first five games over his first five starts as the Gulls set a franchise record for the longest win streak to start the season. Both win streaks were broken on 19 February, after Dostál let in three goals over seven minutes in an eventual 5–1 loss to the Bakersfield Condors. Although his efforts helped the Gull start the 2020–21 season with a perfect 6–0–0 record, the team began losing consistency and Dostál maintained a 5–7–0 record over his first 12 games. Dostál's rookie season involved him becoming more comfortable on the smaller ice surfaces that were standard in North America but much larger in the Liiga. Between 31 March and 30 April, Dostál set a Gulls rookie record with an eight-game win streak although this was shortly followed by a seven-game winning drought. Dostál finished his rookie season with a 15–9–0 record, a 2.87 goals against average, .916 save percentage over 24 games. He also finished the regular season second among AHL goaltenders in saves with 813 and third in wins. Due to his regular season success, Dostál made his AHL playoff debut during the Pacific Division semifinal of the 2021 Calder Cup playoffs against the Condors. In Game 1, he made 39 saves to lead the Gulls to a 5–3 win. Over the three-game series, he led the division with a .935 save percentage although the Gulls would fail to advance.

Following his rookie season, Dostál attended the Ducks' training camp ahead of the 2021–22 season although he was reassigned to the Gulls. However, he was recalled to the NHL level on 15 October, without having played a game for the Gulls. He returned to the Gulls on 17 October, but the team struggled with an 0–2–0 record to start the season. By 12 December, Dostál had maintained a 5–5–0 record and a 2.83 goals against average. Due to the unique problems the COVID-19 pandemic had on the NHL, teams were allowed to carry a "taxi squad" to ensure teams were equipped with enough players. Dostál was assigned to the Ducks' taxi squad on 27 December, along with five other players. On 9 January 2022, Dostál made his NHL debut in place of Anthony Stolarz who had played the previous night. He made 33 saves in the Ducks 4–3 shootout win over the Detroit Red Wings to become the first Ducks goaltender to win his NHL debut since Kevin Boyle in 2019. He also set a franchise rookie record for most saves by a Ducks goaltender in their NHL debut and became the fifth goaltender in Ducks history to make his NHL debut at age 21 or younger. Upon rejoining the Gulls, Dostál recorded his first career AHL shutout on 26 February, against the Henderson Silver Knights. He subsequently became the youngest goaltender in franchise history to post a shutout and it marked the Gulls' first shutout since 2 March 2019. Following this accomplishment, Dostál was named the AHL's Player of the Week for the week ending on 28 February. A few days later, Dostál made 51 saves and scored an empty net goal to clinch a 5–2 win over the Colorado Eagles. This made him the first Gulls goaltender to score a goal in a game and the 17th in league history. He finished his first full season in the AHL tied for second among rookies with a 2.60 goals against average and third with a .916 save percentage.

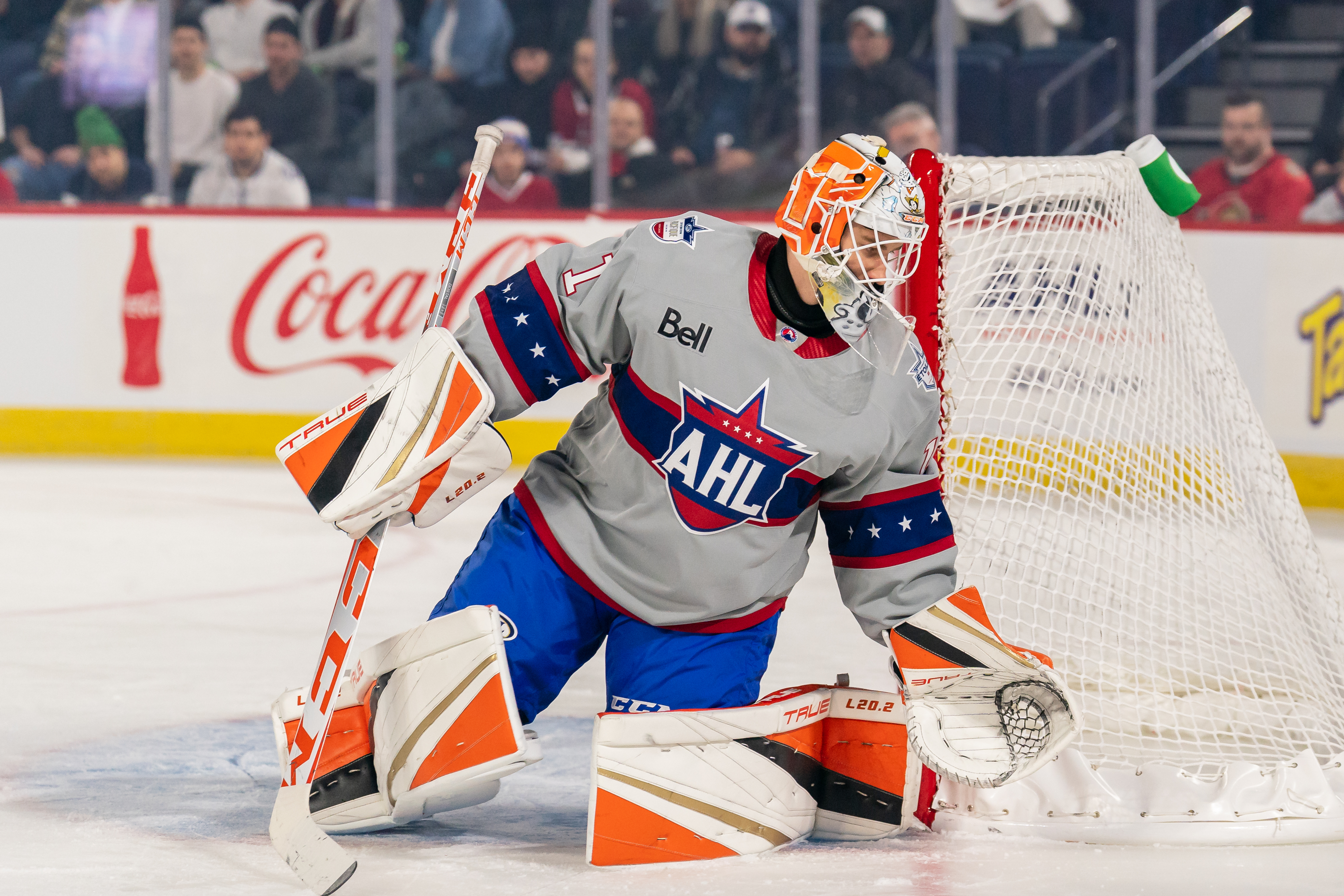
Dostál during the 2023 AHL All-Star Classic Game.

After participating in the Ducks' training camp and preseason ahead of the 2022–23 season, Dostál returned to the AHL for his third campaign with the Gulls. Dostál was named the AHL's Player of the Week for the week ending on 13 November 2022, after he stopped 83 of 86 shots to maintain a 2–1–0 record over three games. Over his first 20 games of the season, Dostál posted a 6–13–0 record with one shutout, a 2.88 goals against average, and .916 save percentage. In December, Dostál became the first Ducks rookie goaltender with multiple 40-save appearances after he made over 40 saves in two games against the Calgary Flames and Edmonton Oilers. His 46 saves against Edmonton ranked second all-time by a Ducks rookie goaltender, behind Frederik Andersen in 2014. Despite his performance, the Ducks reassigned Dostál to the Gulls on 1 January, after veteran goaltender Anthony Stolarz recovered from an injury and was able to backup starter John Gibson. In his first game back with the Gulls, Dostál posted a 39-save shutout against the Henderson Silver Knights. Upon returning to the AHL in January, Dostál had improved to an 8–14–0 record and ranked second among goaltenders in shutouts and saves made. As such, he was selected to represent the Gulls at the 2023 AHL All-Star Classic. During the AHL All-Star Challenge, Dostál recorded two assists to tie Christopher Gibson for the most assists in an All-Star Challenge/Game and was named co-MVP alongside Calgary Wranglers goaltender Dustin Wolf. He finished the AHL regular season with an 11–21–0 record and a career-high three shutouts. He signed a two-year contract extension with the Ducks on 16 July 2023.

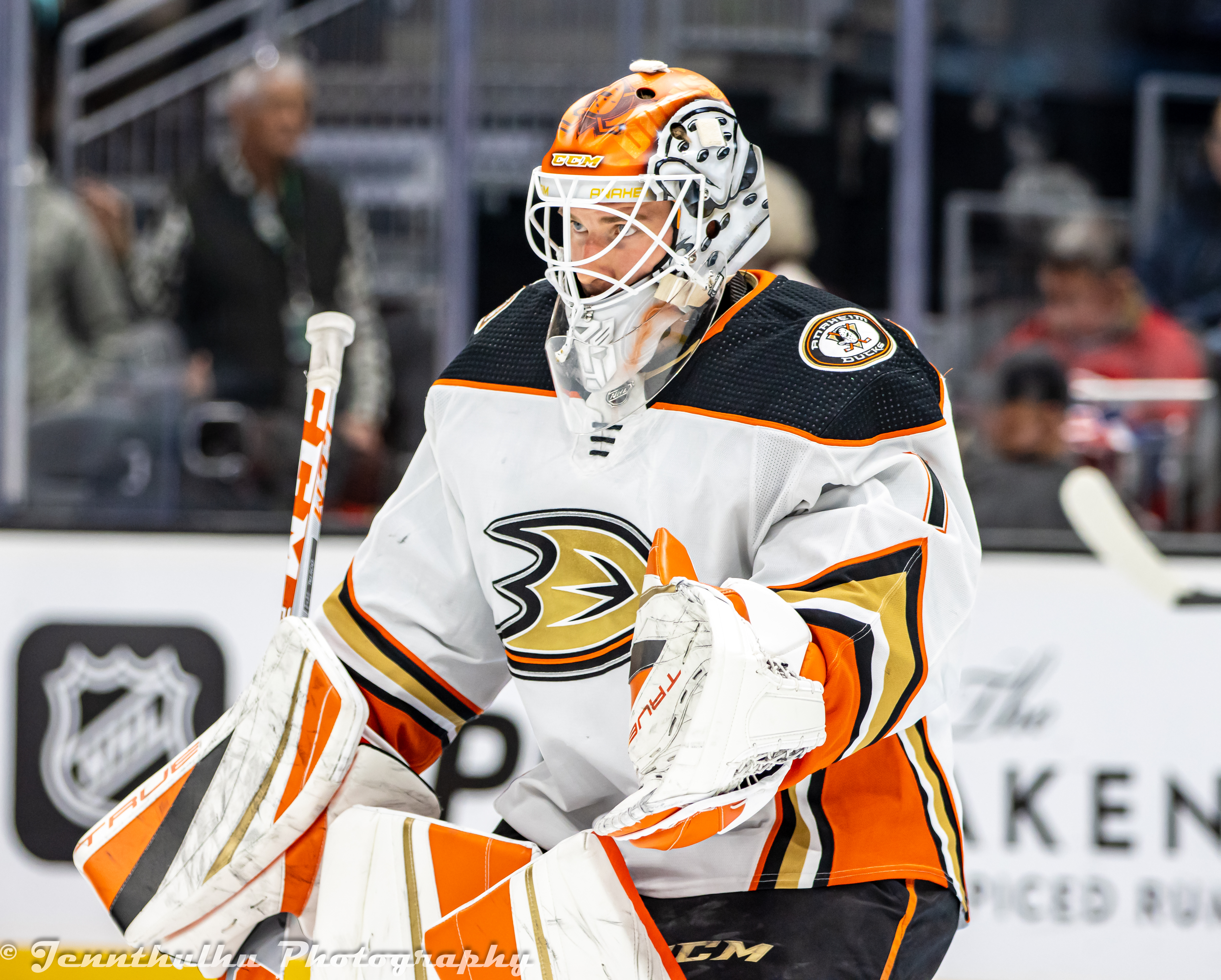
Dostal with the Anaheim Ducks in the 2023–24 season.

Unlike in previous seasons, Dostál remained with the Ducks following training camp and preseason games and made their opening night roster for the 2023–24 season. He was one of 12 players on the Anaheim Ducks' opening night roster who were 25 and younger. Dostál made an immediate positive impact on the Ducks lineup as he led rookie goaltenders with four wins over five appearances in October. He also led all rookie goaltenders in saves with 151 and shots against with 164. As such, he was recognized by the league as the NHL's Rookie of the Month for October. On 3 January 2024, Dostál set a franchise record of 55 saves for the Anaheim Ducks although the team would fall to the Toronto Maple Leafs 2–1 in overtime. Later, on 2 March, Dostál set a franchise record for most saves made in a win after making 52 saves in a game against the New Jersey Devils. His save total also matched the second-most saves by any rookie goaltender in a victory since 1977. Later that month, Dostál helped the Ducks end their seven-game losing streak by earning his first NHL shutout against the Chicago Blackhawks on 22 March. He became the third rookie in Ducks history to record a shutout, joining John Gibson and Ilya Bryzgalov. Dostál finished his rookie season with 14 wins as the Ducks finished with a 27–50–5 record.

== Personal life ==
In 2024, Dostál, Frank Vatrano, and Adam Henrique designed custom shoes for the shoe company Vans in honor of the Ducks franchise's 30th anniversary.

== International play ==
Medal record

Representing Czech Republic

World Championships
Bronze medal – third place	2022 Finland	
Gold medal – first place	2024 Czechia	

Ivan Hlinka Memorial Tournament
Silver medal – second place	2017 Czech Republic-Slovakia	

Dostál has represented Czechia at the Ice Hockey World Championships twice, in 2022 and 2024, medaling in both, with a bronze and a gold, respectively.

In the 2024 IIHF World Championship, Dostál served as the starting goaltender for the Czechs, starting all but two games. It proved to be the correct decision, as Dostál dominated the tournament with a 1.58 GAA. Dostál recorded two shutouts in the playoff round of the tournament, one in the quarterfinal against the United States, and another in the gold medal game against Switzerland, propelling the Czechs to a gold medal victory on their home soil.

Lukáš Dostál represented the Czech Republic team at the 2026 Winter Olympics.

== Career statistics ==
=== Regular season and playoffs ===
			Regular season									Playoffs
Season	Team	League	GP	W	L	OT	MIN	GA	SO	GAA	SV%	GP	W	L	MIN	GA	SO	GAA	SV%
2015–16	HC Kometa Brno	Czech.U20	7	3	4	0	425	31	0	4.38	.891	—	—	—	—	—	—	—	—
2016–17	HC Kometa Brno	Czech.U20	39	26	13	0	2,326	98	1	2.53	.925	12	6	6	722	37	1	3.07	.896
2017–18	HC Kometa Brno	Czech.U20	14	11	3	0	841	42	0	3.00	.919	7	7	0	430	10	2	1.40	.959
2017–18	SK Horácká Slavia Třebíč	Czech.1	20	10	10	0	1,212	49	2	2.43	.921	—	—	—	—	—	—	—	—
2018–19	SK Horácká Slavia Třebíč	Czech.1	24	15	9	0	1,465	61	3	2.50	.915	—	—	—	—	—	—	—	—
2018–19	HC Kometa Brno	ELH	2	1	1	0	80	4	0	3.00	.852	—	—	—	—	—	—	—	—
2018–19	Koovee	Mestis	1	0	0	1	62	2	0	1.97	.938	—	—	—	—	—	—	—	—
2018–19	Ilves	Liiga	10	4	4	2	601	18	1	1.80	.920	7	2	5	457	19	0	2.71	.907
2019–20	Ilves	Liiga	43	27	8	6	2,592	77	3	1.78	.928	—	—	—	—	—	—	—	—
2020–21	Ilves	Liiga	11	10	1	0	659	18	1	1.64	.941	—	—	—	—	—	—	—	—
2020–21	San Diego Gulls	AHL	24	15	9	0	1,424	68	0	2.87	.916	3	1	2	188	8	0	2.55	.935
2021–22	San Diego Gulls	AHL	40	18	14	4	2,189	95	2	2.60	.916	2	0	2	110	9	0	4.90	.850
2021–22	Anaheim Ducks	NHL	4	1	2	0	202	10	0	2.98	.907	—	—	—	—	—	—	—	—
2022–23	San Diego Gulls	AHL	34	11	21	0	1,836	91	3	2.97	.912	—	—	—	—	—	—	—	—
2022–23	Anaheim Ducks	NHL	19	4	10	3	1,063	67	0	3.78	.901	—	—	—	—	—	—	—	—
2023–24	Anaheim Ducks	NHL	44	14	23	3	2,323	129	1	3.33	.902	—	—	—	—	—	—	—	—
2024–25	Anaheim Ducks	NHL	54	23	23	7	3,058	158	1	3.10	.903	—	—	—	—	—	—	—	—
2025–26	Anaheim Ducks	NHL	56	30	20	4	3,268	169	0	3.10	.888	12	6	6	628	37	0	3.54	.870
ELH totals			2	1	1	0	80	4	0	3.00	.852	—	—	—	—	—	—	—	—
Liiga totals			64	41	13	8	3,852	113	5	1.76	.929	7	2	5	457	19	0	2.71	.907
NHL totals			177	72	78	17	9,913	533	2	3.23	.898	12	6	6	628	37	0	3.54	.870

=== International ===
Year	Team	Event	Result	GP	W	L	T	MIN	GA	SO	GAA	SV%
2016	Czech Republic	U17	8th	4	1	1	2	249	8	0	1.93	.929
2017	Czech Republic	IH18	2nd place, silver medalist(s)	4	3	1	0	240	10	0	2.50	.919
2018	Czech Republic	U18	4th	5	2	3	0	251	14	0	3.34	.905
2019	Czech Republic	WJC	7th	4	2	2	0	239	5	1	1.25	.957
2020	Czech Republic	WJC	7th	3	1	2	0	179	12	0	4.03	.878
2022	Czechia	WC	3rd place, bronze medalist(s)	1	1	0	0	60	1	0	1.00	.944
2024	Czechia	WC	1st place, gold medalist(s)	8	6	2	0	492	13	2	1.58	.939
2026	Czechia	OG	8th	4	1	1	2	242	17	0	3.72	.887
Junior totals				20	9	9	2	1,158	49	1	2.53	.921
Senior totals				13	8	3	2	794	31	2	2.34	.915

== Awards and honours ==
Award	Year
CZE
Czech.U18 champion	2016
Czech.U20 champion	2018
Liiga
Urpo Ylönen trophy	2020
All-Star Team	2020
Player of the Month	2021 (October)
AHL
AHL All-Star Game	2023
NHL
Rookie of the Month	2023 (October)
International
World Championship All-Star Team	2024
World Championship best goaltender	2024
