= David Kämpf =

Czech ice hockey player (born 1995)

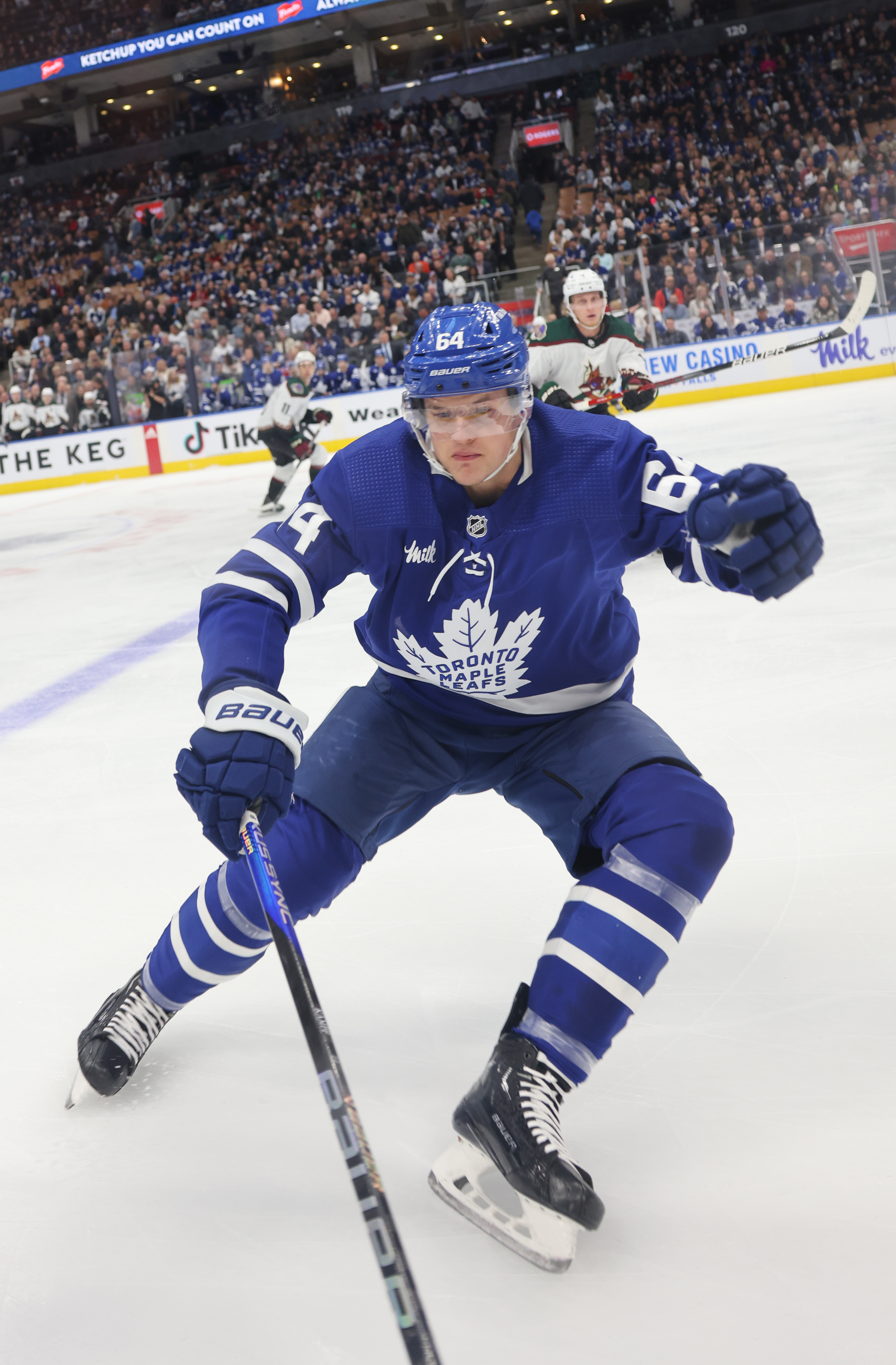
- Kämpf with the Toronto Maple Leafs in 2022
- Born: 12 January 1995 (age 31) Jirkov, Czech Republic
- Height: 6 ft 2 in (188 cm)
- Weight: 192 lb (87 kg; 13 st 10 lb)
- Position: Forward
- Shoots: Left
- ELH team Former teams: HC Litvínov; Piráti Chomutov; Chicago Blackhawks; Toronto Maple Leafs; Vancouver Canucks; Washington Capitals
- National team: Czech Republic
- NHL draft: Undrafted
- Playing career: 2012–present

David Kämpf (born 12 January 1995) is a Czech professional ice hockey player who is a forward for HC Litvínov of the Czech Extraliga (ELH). He has previously played in the National Hockey League (NHL) for the Chicago Blackhawks, Toronto Maple Leafs, Vancouver Canucks, and Washington Capitals. Internationally, Kämpf has represented the Czech Republic, contributing to a gold medal win at the 2024 World Championship.

== Playing career ==
Although never drafted, Kämpf began his youth hockey career with Piráti Chomutov in 2009 at the under-16 level. He made his professional debut in the Czech Extraliga with Chomutov during the 2012–13 season. In his fifth year with the club, during the 2016–17 campaign, he had a breakout season, recording a personal best of 15 goals and 31 points across 52 games.

On 19 April 2017, Kämpf chose to exercise his option to remain with Chomutov for another year, despite interest from NHL teams. However, just weeks later, on 1 May, he activated an out-clause in his contract and signed a two-year entry-level deal with the Chicago Blackhawks.

In the 2017–18 season, Kämpf made his NHL debut on 28 December 2017, and netted his first NHL goal on 12 January 2018, contributing to a 2–1 victory over the Winnipeg Jets.

After spending four seasons with the Blackhawks, Kämpf entered free agency and signed a two-year, $3 million deal with the Toronto Maple Leafs on 28 July 2021.

After two successful seasons with the Maple Leafs, Kämpf chose to stay in Toronto by signing a four-year contract extension worth $9.6 million on 28 June 2023, ahead of becoming a free agent.

The Maple Leafs placed Kämpf on waivers at the start of the 2025–26 season and sent him down to play for the Marlies in the AHL. After playing four games in the AHL, Kämpf walked away from the Marlies in November 2025. His absence was considered a breach of contract, and he received a suspension letter from the Leafs on 2 November. His contract was subsequently suspended on 7 November. On 13 November, he was placed on unconditional waivers, with the Maple Leafs citing his absence from the Marlies as justification to terminate his contract.

Subsequently, he signed a one-year contract worth $1.1 million with the Vancouver Canucks on 15 November. On 6 March 2026, Kämpf was traded to the Washington Capitals in exchange for a 2026 sixth-round pick. On 24 June 2026, the Capitals traded him and a 2027 third-round pick to the Buffalo Sabres in exchange for Alex Tuch.

Released as a free agent by the Sabres and following 9 NHL seasons, Kämpf opted to return to his native Czech Republic, agreeing to a three-year contract with HC Litvínov of the ELH on 7 July 2026.

== International play ==
Medal record

Representing Czech Republic

World Championships
Gold medal – first place	2024 Czechia	
Bronze medal – third place	2022 Finland	

Kämpf represented Czechia at the 2024 IIHF World Championship, where he played a key role throughout the tournament. His performance was instrumental in Czechia's impressive run, culminating in a gold medal victory on home ice, Czechia's first IIHF World Championship title since 2010.

== Career statistics ==
=== Regular season and playoffs ===
			Regular season					Playoffs
Season	Team	League	GP	G	A	Pts	PIM	GP	G	A	Pts	PIM
2010–11	KLH Chomutov	CZE U18	9	1	1	2	0	—	—	—	—	—
2011–12	Piráti Chomutov	CZE U18	42	17	29	46	2	2	2	0	2	2
2012–13	Piráti Chomutov	CZE U18	14	13	13	26	8	—	—	—	—	—
2012–13	Piráti Chomutov	CZE U20	24	8	7	15	16	3	0	0	0	0
2012–13	Piráti Chomutov	ELH	2	0	0	0	0	—	—	—	—	—
2012–13	SK Kadaň	Czech.1	6	0	3	3	0	2	0	0	0	0
2013–14	Piráti Chomutov	CZE U20	8	5	10	15	6	1	1	0	1	2
2013–14	Piráti Chomutov	ELH	45	1	2	3	12	—	—	—	—	—
2013–14	SK Kadaň	Czech.1	5	0	2	2	2	—	—	—	—	—
2014–15	Piráti Chomutov	CZE U20	3	0	6	6	6	—	—	—	—	—
2014–15	Piráti Chomutov	Czech.1	44	11	13	24	16	11	2	5	7	6
2015–16	Piráti Chomutov	ELH	42	9	4	13	22	8	0	1	1	0
2015–16	Piráti Chomutov	CZE U20	—	—	—	—	—	1	2	0	2	2
2016–17	Piráti Chomutov	ELH	52	15	16	31	16	15	3	7	10	6
2017–18	Rockford IceHogs	AHL	33	7	11	18	14	13	1	0	1	2
2017–18	Chicago Blackhawks	NHL	46	4	7	11	12	—	—	—	—	—
2018–19	Chicago Blackhawks	NHL	63	4	15	19	14	—	—	—	—	—
2019–20	Chicago Blackhawks	NHL	70	8	8	16	8	9	1	0	1	6
2020–21	Chicago Blackhawks	NHL	56	1	11	12	20	—	—	—	—	—
2021–22	Toronto Maple Leafs	NHL	82	11	15	26	20	7	2	0	2	6
2022–23	Toronto Maple Leafs	NHL	82	7	20	27	8	11	0	3	3	4
2023–24	Toronto Maple Leafs	NHL	78	8	11	19	18	7	1	0	1	0
2024–25	Toronto Maple Leafs	NHL	59	5	8	13	14	1	0	0	0	0
2025–26	Toronto Marlies	AHL	4	0	1	1	0	—	—	—	—	—
2025–26	Vancouver Canucks	NHL	38	2	4	6	10	—	—	—	—	—
2025–26	Washington Capitals	NHL	2	0	0	0	2	—	—	—	—	—
ELH totals			141	25	22	47	50	34	5	13	18	12
NHL totals			576	50	99	149	126	35	4	3	7	16

=== International ===
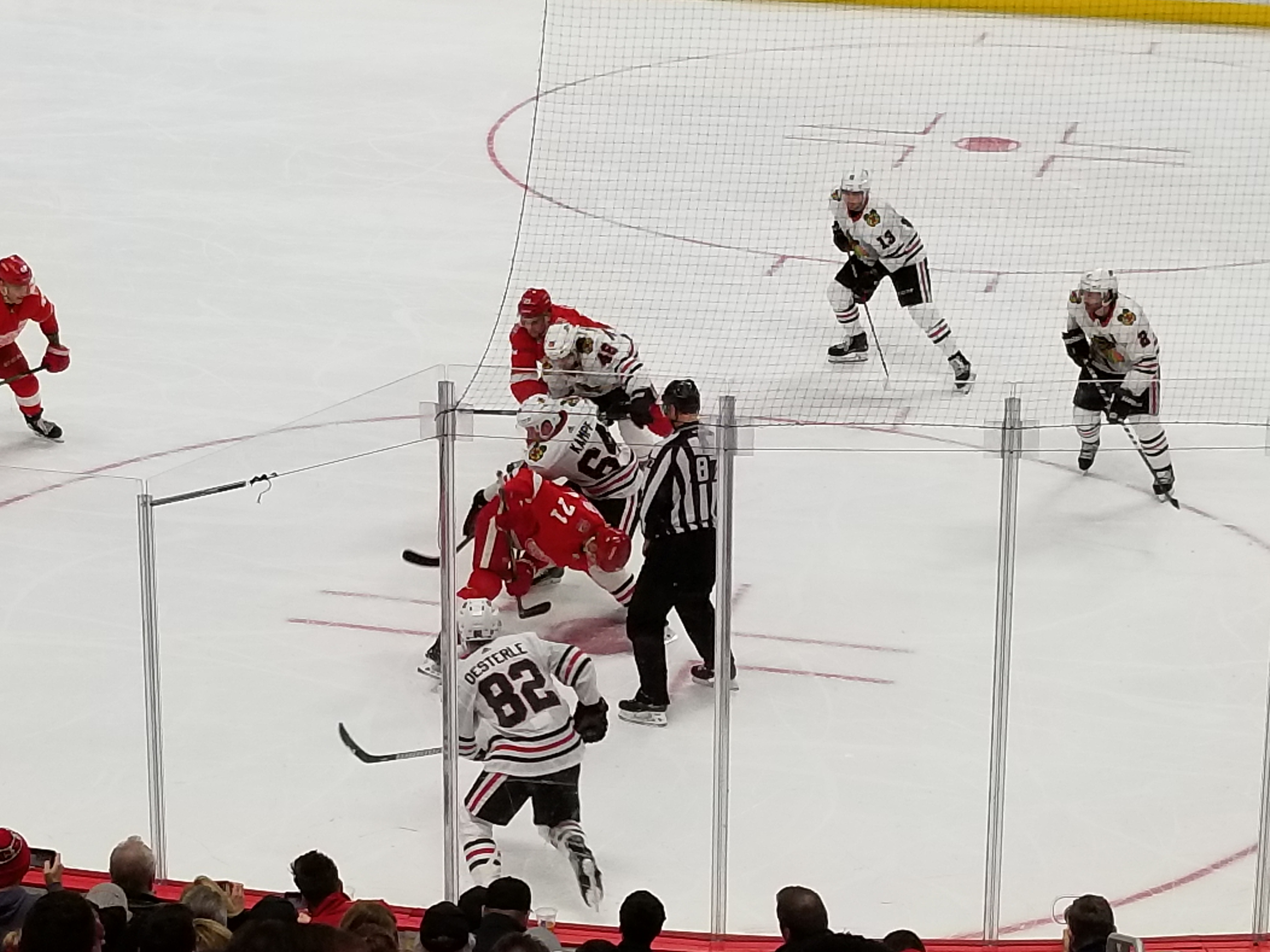
Kämpf (64) attempting to win a faceoff against the Detroit Red Wings in 2018.

Year	Team	Event	Result	GP	G	A	Pts	PIM
2012	Czech Republic	U17	8th	5	0	0	0	4
2012	Czech Republic	IH18	4th	5	1	0	1	0
2013	Czech Republic	U18	7th	5	2	2	4	6
2014	Czech Republic	WJC	6th	5	1	1	2	4
2015	Czech Republic	WJC	6th	5	0	2	2	0
2022	Czechia	WC	3rd place, bronze medalist(s)	6	2	1	3	0
2024	Czechia	WC	1st place, gold medalist(s)	9	2	5	7	0
2025	Czechia	WC	6th	1	0	0	0	0
2026	Czechia	OG	8th	5	1	2	3	0
Junior totals				25	4	5	9	14
Senior totals				21	5	8	13	0
