= 2025–26 Czech Extraliga season =

- League: Czech Extraliga
- Sport: Ice hockey
- Duration: 9 September 2025 – 6 March 2026 (Regular season); 9 March 2026 – 28/30 April 2026 (Playoffs)
- Teams: 14

Regular season
- Pohár Jaroslava Pouzara: Dynamo Pardubice
- Top scorer: Roman Červenka (Dynamo Pardubice)

Playoffs

Finals
- Champions: Dynamo Pardubice
- Runners-up: Oceláři Třinec

Czech Extraliga seasons
- 2024–25 2026–27

The 2025–26 Czech Extraliga season was the 33rd season of the Czech Extraliga since its creation after the breakup of Czechoslovakia and the Czechoslovak First Ice Hockey League in 1993. Sparta Praha drew the highest average home league attendance with 12,804. Dynamo Pardubice won their fourth Extraliga championship and first since 2012, defeating Oceláři Třinec in the finals in six games.

== Regular season ==
Each team plays 52 games, playing each of the other 13 teams four times – twice at home, and twice away. Points were awarded for each game, where three points are awarded for winning in regulation time, two points for winning in overtime or shootout, one point for losing in overtime or shootout, and zero points for losing in regulation time. At the end of the regular season, the team that finishes with the most points is crowned winner of the regular season.

=== Standings ===
Pos	Team	Pld	W	OTW	OTL	L	GF	GA	GD	Pts	Qualification
1	Pardubice (C)	52	26	7	7	12	165	117	+48	99	Advance to Playoffs, Regular season winners and Champions Hockey League
2	Plzeň	52	25	5	8	14	142	104	+38	93	Advance to Playoffs and Champions Hockey League (Note: As Pardubice won both the league and the playoffs, Liberec qualified as the highest-placed team not already qualified.)
3	Liberec	52	25	3	10	14	148	121	+27	91	Advance to Playoffs and Champions Hockey League
4	Mountfield HK	52	24	8	2	18	141	120	+21	90	Qualification to Quarter-finals
5	Třinec	52	23	7	4	18	148	131	+17	87	Qualification to Wild card round
6	Karlovy Vary	52	22	8	5	17	138	130	+8	87	Qualification to Wild card round
7	Sparta Praha	52	23	6	5	18	161	135	+26	86	Qualification to Wild card round
8	Kometa Brno	52	20	5	6	21	141	149	−8	76	Qualification to Wild card round
9	České Budějovice	52	18	6	6	22	143	148	−5	72	Qualification to Wild card round
10	Kladno	52	18	5	6	23	129	137	−8	70	Qualification to Wild card round
11	Vítkovice	52	18	5	6	23	135	160	−25	70	Qualification to Wild card round
12	Olomouc	52	19	3	3	27	124	158	−34	66	Qualification to Wild card round
13	Mladá Boleslav	52	15	6	5	26	102	140	−38	62	
14	Litvínov	52	11	3	4	34	107	174	−67	43	Qualification to Play Out

Source: Tipsport Extraliga
Rules for classification: 1) Points; 2) Head-to-head points.
(C) Play-off Champions and Champions Hockey League

=== Statistics ===
==== Scoring leaders ====
The following shows the top ten players who led the league in points, at the conclusion of the regular season.

Player	Team	GP	G	A	Pts	+/–	PIM
(Czech Republic) Roman Červenka	Pardubice	43	19	41	60	+26	28
(Czech Republic) Lukáš Sedlák	Pardubice	49	17	25	52	+24	31
(Czech Republic) Filip Chlapík	Sparta Praha	48	21	30	51	+5	32
(Canada) Anthony Nellis	Vítkovice	52	25	22	47	0	30
(Denmark) Nick Olesen	České Budějovice	51	14	31	45	–10	32
(Czech Republic) Jakub Flek	Kometa Brno	50	24	20	44	–1	4
(Slovakia) Libor Hudáček	Třinec	51	17	27	44	+7	51
(Slovakia) Róbert Lantoši	České Budějovice	52	17	26	43	–4	36
(Czech Republic) Jan Košťálek	Pardubice	46	16	27	43	+9	26
(Czech Republic) Michael Špaček	Sparta Praha	52	15	28	43	–3	18

==== Leading goaltenders ====
The following shows the top ten goaltenders who led the league in goals against average, provided that they have played at least 40% of their team's minutes, at the conclusion of the regular season.

Player	Team	GP	TOI	W	L	GA	SO	Sv%	GAA
(Czech Republic) Nick Malík	Plzeň	41	2403	25	14	66	6	92.93	1.65
(Slovakia) Stanislav Škorvánek	Mountfield HK	44	2550	28	15	83	9	92.43	1.95
(Czech Republic) Roman Will	Pardubice	38	2259	25	12	75	2	91.45	1.99
(Czech Republic) Petr Kváča	Liberec	42	2555	24	18	86	6	92.61	2.02
(Czech Republic) Marek Mazanec	Třinec	39	2290	24	14	78	3	92.54	2.04
(Czech Republic) Dominik Frodl	Karlovy Vary	40	2336	23	16	82	5	92.46	2.11
(Czech Republic) Adam Brízgala	Kladno	42	2387	20	20	84	4	92.61	2.11
(Czech Republic) Jakub Kovář	Sparta Praha	26	1491	13	12	57	1	92.07	2.29
(Czech Republic) Josef Kořenář	Sparta Praha	24	1414	15	8	57	1	90.73	2.42
(Czech Republic) Milan Klouček	České Budějovice	26	1502	14	10	61	2	90.87	2.44

== Relegation series ==
The promotion/relegation series featured HC Litvínov, the last-place team in the regular season, and HC Dukla Jihlava, the 1. Liga winners. Litvínov won the series in five games, and will remain in the Extraliga for the 2026–27 season.

17 April 2026; 19:00 (CEST)	Litvínov	3–2 OT (0–1, 1–1, 1–0) (OT: 1–0) score in the series: 1–0	Jihlava	Ivan Hlinka Stadion, Litvínov; Attendance: 5,944

Game reference

Pavel Čajan
Goalies
Adam Beran
Referees:
Josef Barek
Jan Hribik
Linesmen:
Miroslav Lhotský
David Thuma

	0–1	19:26 – Ozols (Dlapa, Jáchym)
D. Kaše – 23:40	1–1
	1–2	34:07 – Lhoták (Michnáč)
Czuczman (O. Kaše, D. Kaše) – 52:25	2–2
Baláž – 69:15	3–2

6 min
Penalties
8 min
52
Shots
27

18 April 2026; 17:30 (CEST)	Litvínov	3–1 (1–0, 2–1, 0–0) score in the series: 2–0	Jihlava	Ivan Hlinka Stadion, Litvínov; Attendance: 5,944

Game reference

Pavel Čajan
Goalies
Adam Beran
Referees:
Matěj Sýkora
Tomáš Cabák
Linesmen:
Michal Zíka
Lukáš Rampír

Hlava (Pištěk, Schmiemann) (PP) – 8:23	1–0
	1–1	21:33 – Burkov (Ozols, Kupriianov)
Sukeľ (O. Kaše, Koblasa) (PP) – 26:50	2–1
D. Kaše (Moravčík, Čajan) – 35:37	3–1

18 min
Penalties
28 min
29
Shots
25

21 April 2026; 19:00 (CEST)	Jihlava	1–5 (0–1, 1–2, 0–2) score in the series: 0–3	Litvínov	Horácká aréna, Jihlava; Attendance: 5,750

Game reference

Adam Beran
Goalies
Pavel Čajan
Referees:
Jan Hribik
Filip Vrba
Linesmen:
Jiří Ondráček
Josef Špůr

	0–1	4:10 – D. Kaše (O. Kaše, Hlava)
Harkabus (Kupriianov) (PP) – 27:12	1–1
	1–2	28:12 – Hännikäinen (O. Kaše, D. Kaše)
	1–3	33:26 – Koblasa (Sukeľ, O. Kaše) (PP)
	1–4	42:22 – Sukeľ
	1–5	42:50 – Gut (Pištěk)

4 min
Penalties
10 min
23
Shots
28

22 April 2026; 17:30 (CEST)	Jihlava	4–2 (2–0, 0–0, 2–2) score in the series: 1–3	Litvínov	Horácká aréna, Jihlava; Attendance: 5,750

Game reference

Adam Beran
Goalies
Pavel Čajan
Referees:
Adam Kika
Pavel Obadal
Linesmen:
Vít Lederer
Jaroslav Peluha

Lhoták (Čachotský, Strejček) (PP) – 4:20	1–0
Jiránek (Pořízek) – 19:56	2–0
Kupriianov (Harkabus) – 43:37	3–0
	3–1	52:57 – Pištěk (Gut)
	3–2	53:42 – Baláž (Koblasa, Zygmunt)
Čachotský (EN) – 58:30	4–2

8 min
Penalties
18 min
16
Shots
34

25 April 2026; 17:30 (CEST)	Litvínov	5–0 (3–0, 2–0, 0–0) score in the series: 4–1	Jihlava	Ivan Hlinka Stadion, Litvínov; Attendance: 5,944

Game reference

Pavel Čajan
Goalies
Adam Beran
Maksim Zhukov
Referees:
Jiří Ondráček
Daniel Pražák
Linesmen:
Jiří Svoboda
Lukáš Rampír

Jurčík – 2:21	1–0
D. Kaše (Hlava, O. Kaše) – 2:37	2–0
Sukeľ (Moravčík, O. Kaše) (PP) – 13:58	3–0
Gut (Hännikäinen, Pištěk) – 22:37	4–0
Polášek (Sukeľ) (SH) – 37:35	5–0

4 min
Penalties
27 min
20
Shots
23

== Playoffs ==
Twelve teams qualify for the playoffs: the top four teams in the regular season have a bye to the quarterfinals, while teams ranked fifth to twelfth meet each other (5 versus 12, 6 versus 11, 7 versus 10, 8 versus 9) in a preliminary playoff round.

=== Bracket ===
Wild-card round (best-of-5)
5	Třinec	3
12	Olomouc	0
6	Karlovy Vary	3
11	Vítkovice	0
8	Kometa Brno	3
9	České Budějovice	1
7	Sparta Praha	3
10	Kladno	2

Quarter-finals (best-of-7)
4	Mountfield HK	1
5	Třinec	4
3	Liberec	3
6	Karlovy Vary	4
1	Pardubice	4
8	Kometa Brno	0
2	Plzeň	3
7	Sparta Praha	4

Semi-finals (best-of-7)
1	Pardubice	4
7	Sparta Praha	3
(Pairings are re-seeded after the first and second round)
5	Třinec	4
6	Karlovy Vary	1

Finals (best-of-7)
1	Pardubice	4
5	Třinec	2

=== Wild card round ===
Třinec – Olomouc 3–0
9.3.2026	Třinec	Olomouc	1–0
10.3.2026	Třinec	Olomouc	3–2 OT
12.3.2026	Olomouc	Třinec	1–2 OT
Třinec won the series 3–0.

Sparta Praha – Kladno 3–2
9.3.2026	Sparta Praha	Kladno	1–2 OT
10.3.2026	Sparta Praha	Kladno	3–2 SO
12.3.2026	Kladno	Sparta Praha	2–1 OT
13.3.2026	Kladno	Sparta Praha	2–5
15.3.2026	Sparta Praha	Kladno	3–2 OT
Sparta Praha won the series 3–2.

Karlovy Vary – Vítkovice 3–0
9.3.2026	Karlovy Vary	Vítkovice	3–1
10.3.2026	Karlovy Vary	Vítkovice	5–2
12.3.2026	Vítkovice	Karlovy Vary	1–3
Karlovy Vary won the series 3–0.

Kometa Brno – České Budějovice 3–1
9.3.2026	Kometa Brno	České Budějovice	2–1
10.3.2026	Kometa Brno	České Budějovice	1–2 SO
12.3.2026	České Budějovice	Kometa Brno	2–4
13.3.2026	České Budějovice	Kometa Brno	2–3
Kometa Brno won the series 3–1.

=== Quarterfinals ===
Pardubice – Kometa Brno 4–0
18.3.2026	Pardubice	Kometa Brno	5–1
19.3.2026	Pardubice	Kometa Brno	8–4
22.3.2026	Kometa Brno	Pardubice	1–4
23.3.2026	Kometa Brno	Pardubice	0–1
Pardubice won the series 4–0.

Liberec – Karlovy Vary 3–4
20.3.2026	Liberec	Karlovy Vary	2–3
21.3.2026	Liberec	Karlovy Vary	1–3
24.3.2026	Karlovy Vary	Liberec	0–3
25.3.2026	Karlovy Vary	Liberec	1–4
27.3.2026	Liberec	Karlovy Vary	3–1
29.3.2026	Karlovy Vary	Liberec	4–0
31.3.2026	Liberec	Karlovy Vary	0–1 OT
Karlovy Vary won the series 4–3.

Plzeň – Sparta Praha 3–4
18.3.2026	Plzeň	Sparta Praha	0–2
19.3.2026	Plzeň	Sparta Praha	2–0
22.3.2026	Sparta Praha	Plzeň	3–4 SO
23.3.2026	Sparta Praha	Plzeň	1–2
26.3.2026	Plzeň	Sparta Praha	1–4
28.3.2026	Sparta Praha	Plzeň	4–2
30.3.2026	Plzeň	Sparta Praha	0–1
Sparta Praha won the series 4–3.

Mountfield HK – Třinec 1–4
20.3.2026	Mountfield HK	Třinec	2–4
21.3.2026	Mountfield HK	Třinec	2–3 OT
24.3.2026	Třinec	Mountfield HK	2–3
25.3.2026	Třinec	Mountfield HK	4–2
27.3.2026	Mountfield HK	Třinec	2–3 OT
Třinec won the series 4–1.

=== Semifinals ===
Pardubice – Sparta Praha 4–3
3.4.2026	Pardubice	Sparta Praha	6–2
4.4.2026	Pardubice	Sparta Praha	1–2
7.4.2026	Sparta Praha	Pardubice	1–2 SO
8.4.2026	Sparta Praha	Pardubice	4–2
11.4.2026	Pardubice	Sparta Praha	4–3 OT
13.4.2026	Sparta Praha	Pardubice	3–2
15.4.2026	Pardubice	Sparta Praha	1–0
Pardubice won the series 4–3.

Třinec – Karlovy Vary 4–1
3.4.2026	Třinec	Karlovy Vary	3–1
4.4.2026	Třinec	Karlovy Vary	5–4
7.4.2026	Karlovy Vary	Třinec	2–3
8.4.2026	Karlovy Vary	Třinec	3–0
11.4.2026	Třinec	Karlovy Vary	3–2 OT
Třinec won the series 4–1.

=== Finals ===
18 April 2026	Pardubice	3–2 (0–0, 1–2, 2–0) score in the series: 1–0	Třinec	Enteria Arena, Pardubice; Attendance: 9,326

Game reference

Roman Will
Goalies
Marek Mazanec
Referees:
Tomas Mejzlik
Daniel Prazak
Linesmen:
Miroslav Lhotsky
George Svoboda

Mandát (Tourigny, Sedlák) – 29:54	1–0
	1–1	31:02 – Flynn (Daňo, Cienciala)
	1–2	38:35 – O. Kovařčík (Nestrašil)
Červenka (Sedlák, Ludvig) – 46:45	2–2
Smejkal (Mandát) – 47:01	3–2

8 min
Penalties
10 min
26
Shots
27

19 April 2026	Pardubice	4–2 (1–0, 1–2, 2–0) score in the series: 2–0	Třinec	Enteria Arena, Pardubice; Attendance: 10,102

Game reference

Roman Will
Goalies
Ondřej Kacetl
Referees:
Adam Kika
Robin Šír
Linesmen:
Michal Axman
Daniel Hynek

Sedlák (Červenka, Mandát) – 3:40	1–0
Červenka (Kondelík, Sedlák) (PP) – 22:51	2–0
	2–1	27:42 – Růžička (Sikora, Kundrátek)
	2–2	38:04 – O. Kovařčík (M. Kovařčík, Galvas)
Červenka (Ludvig) – 44:06	3–2
Sobotka (Lauko, Ludvig) (EN) – 59:43	4–2

13 min
Penalties
17 min
21
Shots
37

22 April 2026	Třinec	5–4 OT (1–2, 1–2, 2–0) (OT: 1–0) score in the series: 1–2	Pardubice	Werk Arena, Třinec; Attendance: 5,400

Game reference

Ondřej Kacetl
Goalies
Roman Will
Referees:
Antonín Jeřábek
Lukáš Květoň
Linesmen:
Michal Zíka
Petr Šimánek

	0–1	5:17 – Kondelík (Gazda, Stránský)
Nestrašil (M. Kovařčík, Adámek) (PP) – 8:33	1–1
	1–2	15:35 – Sedlák (Hájek, Gazda)
	1–3	21:17 – Čerešňák (Červenka) (PP)
	1–4	26:58 – Ludvig (Sedlák, Kelemen)
Hudáček (Kundrátek, Nestrašil) (PP) – 33:42	2–4
Kundrátek (M. Kovařčík, Galvas) – 56:54	3–4
Nestrašil (M. Kovařčík) – 58:11	4–4
Daňo (Adámek, Hudáček) – 75:51	5–4

6 min
Penalties
8 min
53
Shots
40

23 April 2026	Třinec	4–2 (2–2, 1–0, 1–0) score in the series: 2–2	Pardubice	Werk Arena, Třinec; Attendance: 5,400

Game reference

Ondřej Kacetl
Goalies
Roman Will
Malcolm Subban
Referees:
Adam Kika
Jiří Ondráček
Linesmen:
Jiří Ondráček
Lukáš Rampír

Flynn (Galvas, Hudáček) – 1:59	1–0
Hudáček (Daňo) – 2:51	2–0
	2–1	8:29 – Sedlák (Hájek)
	2–2	9:57 – Červenka (Sedlák) (PP)
Musil (Flynn, Hudáček) – 36:52	3–2
Roman (Daňo, Marinčin) (EN) – 59:49	4–2

8 min
Penalties
8 min
30
Shots
32

26 April 2026	Pardubice	2–1 (1–0, 0–0, 1–1) score in the series: 3–2	Třinec	Enteria Arena, Pardubice; Attendance: 10,194

Game reference

Roman Will
Goalies
Ondřej Kacetl
Referees:
Tomáš Mejzlík
Robin Šír
Linesmen:
Daniel Hynek
Michal Zíka

Kondelík (Sedlák, Červenka) (PP) – 2:49	1–0
	1–1	43:24 – Nestrašil (O. Kovařčík, Galvas)
Sedlák (Lauko, Tourigny) – 58:44	2–1

4 min
Penalties
14 min
32
Shots
14

28 April 2026	Třinec	4–5 OT (1–2, 2–1, 1–1) (OT: 0–1) score in the series: 2–4	Pardubice	Werk Arena, Třinec; Attendance: 5,400

Game reference

Ondřej Kacetl
Goalies
Roman Will
Referees:
Antonín Jeřábek
Lukáš Květoň
Linesmen:
Jiří Ondráček
Petr Šimánek

Sikora (Kubiesa, Růžička) – 2:39	1–0
	1–1	11:43 – Fejes (Poulíček, Vondráček)
	1–2	13:23 – Tourigny (Ludvig, Stránský)
Nestrašil (M. Kovařčík) – 27:06	2–2
	2–3	30:38 – Červenka (Kondelík)
Kundrátek (Cienciala) – 30:54	3–3
	3–4	42:58 – Mandát (Smejkal)
Flynn (Kundrátek, Hudáček) – 51:51	4–4
	4–5	60:57 – Červenka (Sedlák, Kelemen)

4 min
Penalties
14 min
47
Shots
23

== Final rankings ==
Gold medal	Pardubice
Silver medal	Třinec
Bronze medal	Karlovy Vary
4	Sparta Praha
5	Plzeň
6	Liberec
7	Mountfield HK
8	Kometa Brno
9	České Budějovice
10	Kladno
11	Vítkovice
12	Olomouc
13	Mladá Boleslav
14	Litvínov
