= Ondřej Kaše =

Czech ice hockey player (born 1995)

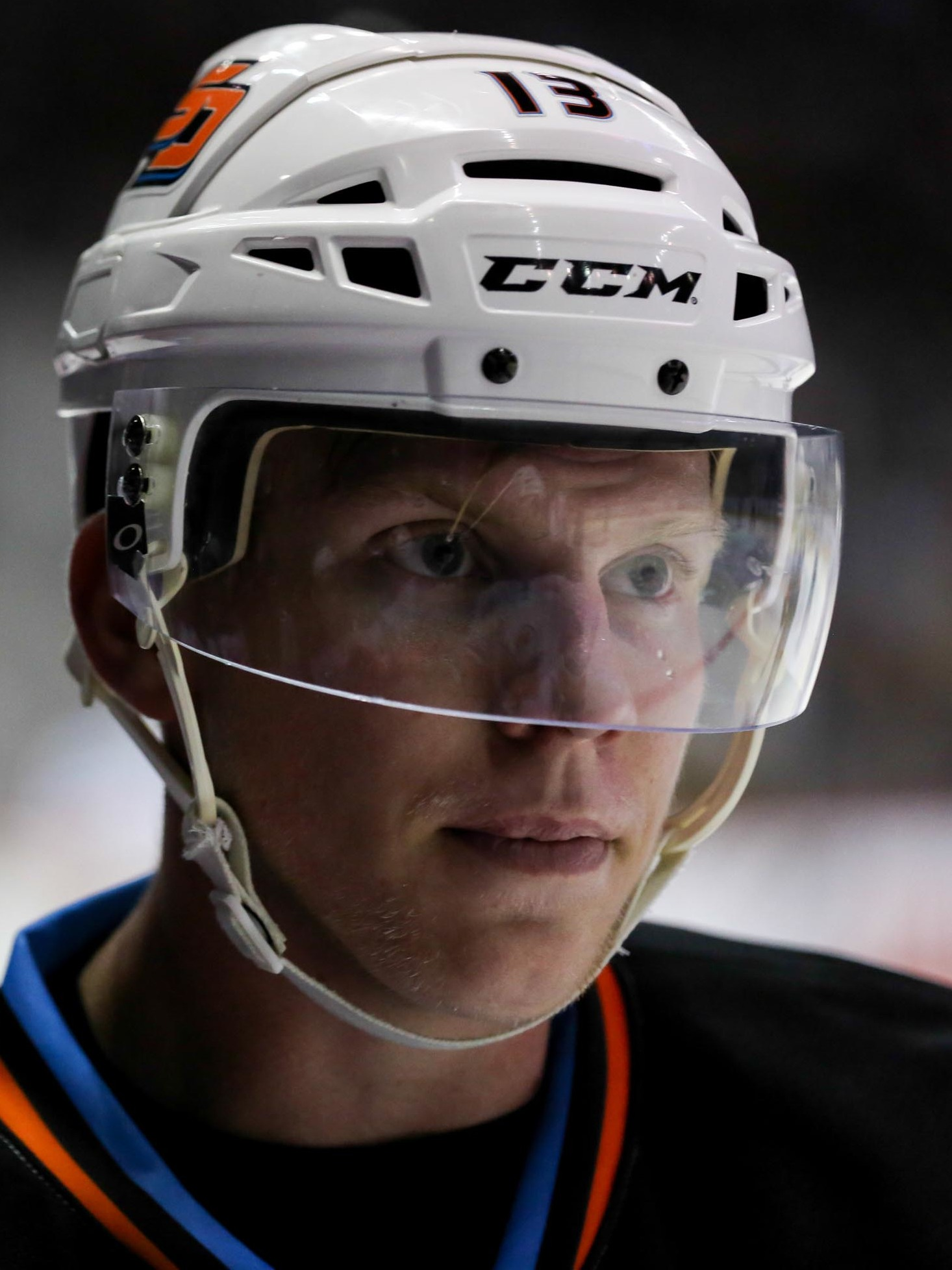
- Kaše with the San Diego Gulls in 2015
- Born: 8 November 1995 (age 30) Kadaň, Czech Republic
- Height: 6 ft 0 in (183 cm)
- Weight: 187 lb (85 kg; 13 st 5 lb)
- Position: Forward
- Shoots: Right
- ELH team Former teams: HC Litvínov; Piráti Chomutov; Anaheim Ducks; Boston Bruins; Toronto Maple Leafs; Carolina Hurricanes
- National team: Czech Republic
- NHL draft: 205th overall, 2014; Anaheim Ducks
- Playing career: 2013–present

Ondřej Kaše (born 8 November 1995) is a Czech professional ice hockey player who is a forward for HC Litvínov of the Czech Extraliga (ELH). He has previously played in the National Hockey League (NHL) with the Anaheim Ducks, Boston Bruins, Toronto Maple Leafs and Carolina Hurricanes. Kase was selected by the Ducks in the seventh round, 205th overall, during the 2014 NHL entry draft.

== Playing career ==
=== Czech Republic ===
Kaše made his Czech Extraliga debut playing with Piráti Chomutov debut during the 2013–14 Czech Extraliga season. Kaše recorded seven points in 37 games for Chomutov, while also appearing in five games with SK Kadan. At the conclusion of the season, Kaše was selected in the seventh round, 205th overall during the 2014 NHL entry draft. Kaše increased his scoring totals the following season, scoring seven goals and 21 points in 37 games.

=== Anaheim Ducks ===
On 14 May 2015, Kaše was signed to a three-year entry-level contract with the Ducks. Kaše spent the entirety of the 2015–16 season with the Ducks' American Hockey League (AHL) affiliate, the San Diego Gulls. In 25 games with the club, Kaše scored eight goals and 14 points. He also contributed one goal and four points in nine postseason games.

On 4 November 2016, Kaše recorded his first career NHL point, assisting on a goal by Antoine Vermette during a 5–1 win over the Arizona Coyotes. One month later on 1 December, Kaše scored his first career goal against Ryan Miller of the Vancouver Canucks in a 3–1 win. Kaše finished his rookie season with five goals and 15 points in 53 games. The following season, Kaše upped his totals by scoring 20 goals and 38 points in 66 games.

On 15 August 2018, the Ducks re-signed Kaše to a three-year, $7.8 million contract extension worth $2.6 million annually. He played in 30 games for the Ducks, recording 20 points, before requiring season-ending surgery after an injury in a game against the Minnesota Wild.

=== Boston Bruins ===
On 21 February 2020, Kaše was traded to the Boston Bruins in exchange for David Backes, Axel Andersson and a 2020 first-round pick. Kaše played six games with the Bruins before the season was paused due to the COVID-19 pandemic. He had registered a single assist with the Bruins up to that point, but including his time with Anaheim, he had seven goals and 17 assists on the season. Once the season resumed in the playoff bubble, Kaše found some offensive success, with four assists in 11 games before the Bruins were eliminated by the Tampa Bay Lightning in the second round.

Unfortunately, Kaše's next season would be plagued by injury. Kaše was limited to just 3 games in the pandemic shortened 2020–21 season due to lingering concussion symptoms. As a restricted free agent, Kaše was not tendered a qualifying offer by the Bruins, releasing him to free agency.

=== Toronto Maple Leafs ===
On 30 July 2021, Kaše was signed to a one-year, $1.25 million contract with the Toronto Maple Leafs. On 25 April 2022, Kaše was chosen as the Maple Leafs' nominee for the Bill Masterton Memorial Trophy for his dedication and perseverance to the sport after a series of serious head injuries. As a restricted free agent, Kaše was not tendered a qualifying offer by the Leafs, releasing him to free agency.

=== Carolina Hurricanes ===
On 13 July 2022, Kaše was signed to a one-year, $1.5 million contract with the Carolina Hurricanes. Kaše made his debut with the Hurricanes on the opening night of the 2022–23 season against the Columbus Blue Jackets, on 12 October 2022, however after taking another hit he was unable to play and was placed on the long-term injured list for the remainder of the season due to persistent concussion related issues.

=== HC Litvínov ===
As a free agent at the conclusion of his contract with the Hurricanes and having regained his health, Kaše opted to pause his NHL career by returning the Czech Republic and joining his brother David, by signing a contract with HC Litvínov of the ELH on 16 July 2023. Serving as an assistant captain, Kaše had a successful season with Litvínov, scoring at above a point-per-game pace, with 54 points in 48 games, including 23 goals. Kaše would help lead Litvínov to the semi-finals of 2023–24 Czech Extraliga Playoffs, where they would be swept by the top seeded HC Dynamo Pardubice. In 13 playoff games, Kaše had a goal and six assists. After season's end, Kaše joined Team Czech Republic at the 2024 Men's Ice Hockey World Championships, his first appearance with the national club since the 2015 World Junior Ice Hockey Championships, when Kaše was 19.

== Personal ==
Kaše's younger brother, David, plays alongside him for HC Litvinov and was selected in the fifth round, 128th overall, by the Philadelphia Flyers in the 2015 NHL entry draft.

== International play ==
Medal record

Representing Czech Republic

Ice hockey

World Championships
Gold medal – first place	2024 Czechia	

After season's end, Kaše joined Team Czech Republic at the 2024 Men's Ice Hockey World Championships, his first appearance with the national team since the 2015 World Junior Ice Hockey Championships, when Kaše was 19, and his first tournament at the senior international level. Kaše had a successful tournament, both personally and as a team, as he was tied for third on the team with seven points in 10 games, helping the Czechs to their first gold medal in 14 years.

== Career statistics ==
=== Regular season and playoffs ===
			Regular season					Playoffs
Season	Team	League	GP	G	A	Pts	PIM	GP	G	A	Pts	PIM
2011–12	Piráti Chomutov	CZE U18	38	18	26	44	14	2	0	2	2	0
2012–13	Piráti Chomutov	CZE U18	14	10	16	26	6	—	—	—	—	—
2012–13	Piráti Chomutov	CZE U20	22	9	7	16	18	3	0	0	0	2
2012–13	SK Kadaň	Czech.1	9	2	1	3	2	4	1	0	1	0
2013–14	Piráti Chomutov	CZE U20	7	5	10	15	12	1	0	2	2	0
2013–14	Piráti Chomutov	ELH	37	4	3	7	10	—	—	—	—	—
2013–14	SK Kadaň	Czech.1	5	3	1	4	0	—	—	—	—	—
2014–15	Piráti Chomutov	CZE U20	3	1	7	8	0	—	—	—	—	—
2014–15	Piráti Chomutov	Czech.1	37	7	14	21	8	11	6	5	11	4
2015–16	San Diego Gulls	AHL	25	8	6	14	6	9	1	3	4	0
2016–17	San Diego Gulls	AHL	14	6	6	12	4	3	0	1	1	0
2016–17	Anaheim Ducks	NHL	53	5	10	15	18	9	2	0	2	4
2017–18	Anaheim Ducks	NHL	66	20	18	38	14	4	0	0	0	0
2017–18	San Diego Gulls	AHL	1	0	0	0	0	—	—	—	—	—
2018–19	Anaheim Ducks	NHL	30	11	9	20	2	—	—	—	—	—
2019–20	Anaheim Ducks	NHL	49	7	16	23	10	—	—	—	—	—
2019–20	Boston Bruins	NHL	6	0	1	1	4	11	0	4	4	2
2020–21	Boston Bruins	NHL	3	0	0	0	0	—	—	—	—	—
2021–22	Toronto Maple Leafs	NHL	50	14	13	27	14	7	0	3	3	6
2022–23	Carolina Hurricanes	NHL	1	0	0	0	0	—	—	—	—	—
2023–24	HC Litvínov	ELH	48	23	31	54	25	13	1	6	7	8
2024–25	HC Litvínov	ELH	44	15	26	41	22	—	—	—	—	—
2025–26	HC Litvínov	ELH	33	8	17	25	14	—	—	—	—	—
ELH totals			162	50	77	127	71	13	1	6	7	8
NHL totals			258	57	67	124	62	31	2	7	9	12

=== International ===
Year	Team	Event	Result	GP	G	A	Pts	PIM
2012	Czech Republic	U17	8th	5	0	0	0	4
2012	Czech Republic	IH18	4th	5	3	2	5	0
2013	Czech Republic	U18	7th	5	1	2	3	0
2014	Czech Republic	WJC	6th	5	1	2	3	0
2015	Czech Republic	WJC	6th	5	1	1	2	0
2024	Czechia	WC	1st place, gold medalist(s)	10	3	4	7	4
2026	Czechia	OG	8th	5	0	0	0	0
Junior totals				25	6	7	13	4
Senior totals				15	3	4	7	4
