= Jan Stránský =

Czech ice hockey player

- Born: April 16, 1990 (age 36) Plzeň, Czechoslovakia
- Height: 5 ft 10 in (178 cm)
- Weight: 194 lb (88 kg; 13 st 12 lb)
- Position: Right wing
- Shoots: Right
- Czech Extraliga team Former teams: HC Dynamo Pardubice; HC Plzeň 1929; HC Slavia Praha; HC Bílí Tygři Liberec; Piráti Chomutov; BK Mladá Boleslav
- Playing career: 2008–present

Jan Stránský (born April 16, 1990) is a Czech professional ice hockey player. He played with HC Dynamo Pardubice in the Czech Extraliga during the 2025–26 Czech Extraliga season.

Stránský previously played for HC Slavia Praha, HC Bílí Tygři Liberec, Piráti Chomutov and BK Mladá Boleslav.
