= Lukáš Sedlák =

Czech ice hockey player (born 1993)

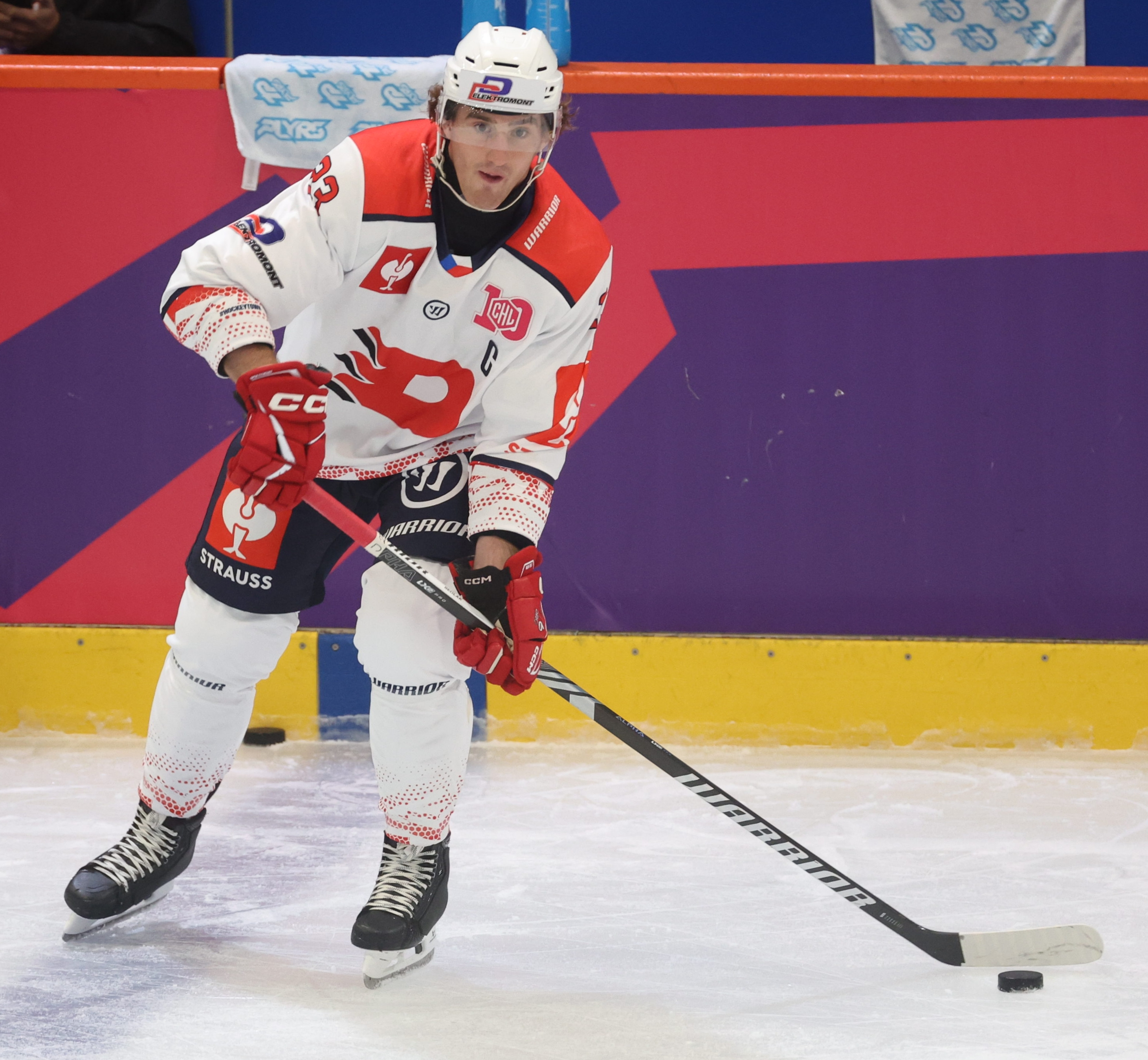
- Sedlák with the HC Dynamo Pardubice in 2024
- Born: 25 February 1993 (age 33) České Budějovice, Czech Republic
- Height: 6 ft 0 in (183 cm)
- Weight: 207 lb (94 kg; 14 st 11 lb)
- Position: Forward
- Shoots: Left
- ELH team Former teams: HC Dynamo Pardubice; Columbus Blue Jackets; Traktor Chelyabinsk; Colorado Avalanche; Philadelphia Flyers
- National team: Czech Republic
- NHL draft: 158th overall, 2011; Columbus Blue Jackets
- Playing career: 2013–present

Lukáš Sedlák (born 25 February 1993) is a Czech professional ice hockey player who is a forward for HC Dynamo Pardubice of the Czech Extraliga (ELH). Sedlak was selected by the Columbus Blue Jackets in the sixth round, 158th overall, of the 2011 NHL entry draft.

== Playing career ==
Sedlák played in his native Czech Republic in the junior ranks of HC Mountfield before he was selected in the 2011 NHL entry draft by the Blue Jackets. Sedlák immediately embarked on transitioning to the North American game, joining the Chicoutimi Saguenéens of the Quebec Major Junior Hockey League for the 2011–12 season, with whom he was drafted with their first selection in the CHL import draft.

On 10 April 2013, Sedlák was signed by the Columbus Blue Jackets to a three-year, entry-level contract. He was assigned to begin his professional career with the Blue Jackets AHL affiliate, the Springfield Falcons of the American Hockey League for the 2013–14 season.

Despite contributing in a depth role defensively, Sedlák was unable to produce offensively throughout the tenure of his rookie contract within the Blue Jackets organization. Sedlák surprisingly saw a late-season spurt offensively toward the end of the 2015–16 season, continuing through to the post-season, in recording 9 goals and 16 points in 17 games to help the Lake Erie Monsters claim the Calder Cup. He was re-signed by the Blue Jackets to a one-year extension in the midst of their playoff run on 26 May 2016.

Sedlák continued his ascent within the Blue Jackets organization after the summer in making the opening night roster for the 2016–17 season with the Blue Jackets. Initially on the roster as the teams extra forward, Sedlák drew into action in the Blue Jackets third game, making his NHL debut in a 3–2 victory over the Chicago Blackhawks on 21 October 2016. In his fourth game, Sedlák registered his first NHL point, an assist, in a 3–1 defeat to the San Jose Sharks on 28 October 2016. He scored his first NHL goal against goalie Petr Mrázek on 9 December 2016, in a 4–1 win over the Red Wings.

Following the completion of his third season with the Blue Jackets in the 2018–19 season, Sedlák opted to pause his NHL career as an impending restricted free agent, signing a two-year Kontinental Hockey League contract with Russian club, Traktor Chelyabinsk, on 31 May 2019.

Sedlák posted 18 goals and 25 assists for 43 points in 49 games for Traktor Chelyabinsk during the 2021–22 season, his third season in the KHL. He added six points in 10 playoff games, finishing tied for fourth on the team in goals. Over his three-year tenure in the KHL, Sedlák collected 121 points in 164 outings, placing sixth in franchise history.

On 10 May 2022, Sedlák as a free agent, was initially signed to a three-year contract to return to his homeland with HC Dynamo Pardubice of the Czech Extraliga (ELH). However, after gaining NHL interest, Sedlák opted to enact an NHL out-clause, securing a one-year contract with the Colorado Avalanche for the 2022–23 season on 13 June 2022.

In reuniting with former AHL head coach, Jared Bednar, from his tenure with Calder Cup-winning Lake Erie Monsters, Sedlák showed his versatility through pre-season and secured the fourth-line center role for the Avalanche. He made his debut with Colorado on opening night, in a 5–2 victory over the Chicago Blackhawks on 13 October 2022. After just three games, Sedlák was placed on waivers in order for the Avalanche to gain roster flexibility, on 18 October 2022. The following day, his tenure with the Avalanche was cut short after he was claimed off waivers by the Philadelphia Flyers, marking another reunion in joining head coach John Tortorella from their previous tenure with the Blue Jackets. Added to the Flyers lineup, Sedlák established himself within the team in a checking-line role and responded with three goals and eight points through 27 games. On 17 December 2022, despite having secured a role within Philadelphia, Sedlák citing a desire to return to his native Czech Republic was placed on unconditional waivers in order to mutually terminate the remainder of his contract with the Flyers. The following day on 18 December, it was announced by HC Dynamo Pardubice that Sedlák would reactivate his three-year contract previously agreed to prior to his signing with the Avalanche.

== International play ==
Medal record

Representing Czech Republic

Ice hockey

World Championships
Gold medal – first place	2024 Czechia	

Sedlák represented Czechia at the 2024 IIHF World Championship and won a gold medal.

== Career statistics ==
=== Regular season and playoffs ===
			Regular season					Playoffs
Season	Team	League	GP	G	A	Pts	PIM	GP	G	A	Pts	PIM
2007–08	HC Mountfield	CZE U18	6	0	2	2	4	2	0	0	0	2
2008–09	HC Mountfield	CZE U18	44	12	17	29	14	4	0	0	0	4
2009–10	HC Mountfield	CZE U18	38	31	28	59	78	4	5	1	6	39
2009–10	HC Mountfield	CZE U20	11	4	8	12	4	—	—	—	—	—
2010–11	HC Mountfield	CZE U20	47	14	13	27	65	—	—	—	—	—
2010–11	HC Mountfield	CZE U18	—	—	—	—	—	1	0	1	1	0
2011–12	Chicoutimi Saguenéens	QMJHL	50	17	28	45	57	18	5	3	8	20
2012–13	Chicoutimi Saguenéens	QMJHL	48	15	19	34	64	6	1	4	5	8
2013–14	Springfield Falcons	AHL	54	8	6	14	26	4	0	1	1	0
2014–15	Springfield Falcons	AHL	51	6	10	16	30	—	—	—	—	—
2015–16	Lake Erie Monsters	AHL	54	14	4	18	27	17	9	7	16	18
2016–17	Columbus Blue Jackets	NHL	62	7	6	13	25	2	0	0	0	0
2017–18	Columbus Blue Jackets	NHL	53	4	4	8	21	—	—	—	—	—
2018–19	Columbus Blue Jackets	NHL	47	4	2	6	10	—	—	—	—	—
2019–20	Traktor Chelyabinsk	KHL	57	23	17	40	80	—	—	—	—	—
2020–21	Traktor Chelyabinsk	KHL	58	16	22	38	95	5	0	0	0	2
2021–22	Traktor Chelyabinsk	KHL	49	18	25	43	36	10	3	3	6	4
2022–23	Colorado Avalanche	NHL	3	0	0	0	0	—	—	—	—	—
2022–23	Philadelphia Flyers	NHL	27	3	5	8	12	—	—	—	—	—
2022–23	HC Dynamo Pardubice	ELH	24	15	12	27	27	10	5	3	8	25
2023–24	HC Dynamo Pardubice	ELH	44	25	22	47	32	16	4	6	10	4
2024–25	HC Dynamo Pardubice	ELH	24	6	18	24	18	14	6	9	15	12
2025–26	HC Dynamo Pardubice	ELH	49	17	35	52	31	17	8	14	22	14
NHL totals			192	18	17	35	68	2	0	0	0	0
KHL totals			164	57	64	121	211	15	3	3	6	6
ELH totals			141	63	87	150	108	57	23	32	55	55

=== International ===
Year	Team	Event	Result	GP	G	A	Pts	PIM
2010	Czech Republic	U17	9th	5	1	1	2	6
2010	Czech Republic	IH18	4th	5	0	3	3	2
2011	Czech Republic	U18	8th	5	3	1	4	2
2012	Czech Republic	WJC	5th	6	0	0	0	0
2013	Czech Republic	WJC	5th	6	1	2	3	10
2022	Czech Republic	OG	9th	4	0	1	1	2
2023	Czechia	WC	8th	3	3	2	5	2
2024	Czechia	WC	1st place, gold medalist(s)	10	5	5	10	0
2025	Czechia	WC	6th	8	4	5	9	0
2026	Czechia	OG	8th	5	1	1	2	2
2026	Czechia	WC	5th	8	1	3	4	2
Junior totals				27	5	7	12	20
Senior totals				38	14	17	31	8

== Awards and honours ==
Awards	Year
AHL
Calder Cup champion	2016
