= John Ludvig =

Canadian ice hockey player (born 2000)

- Born: August 2, 2000 (age 25) Liberec, Czech Republic
- Height: 6 ft 1 in (185 cm)
- Weight: 205 lb (93 kg; 14 st 9 lb)
- Position: Defence
- Shoots: Left
- ELH team Former teams: HC Dynamo Pardubice; Pittsburgh Penguins; Colorado Avalanche
- NHL draft: 69th overall, 2019; Florida Panthers
- Playing career: 2021–present

John Ludvig (born August 2, 2000) is a Czech-Canadian professional ice hockey defenseman for HC Dynamo Pardubice in the Czech Extraliga (ELH).

== Early life ==
Ludvig was born on August 2, 2000, in Liberec, Czech Republic, to parents Jan and Charell. Ludvig was born into an athletic family; his father Jan played for the New Jersey Devils and Buffalo Sabres in the National Hockey League. His sister Katie plays collegiate volleyball.

== Playing career ==
Growing up in British Columbia, Ludvig played defense for most of his youth hockey career but played the position of goaltender for a short period of time. As a defenseman, he played Junior B hockey and went undrafted in the Western Hockey League's (WHL) bantam draft at the age of 14 due to his size. As a result of his father's hockey background, Ludvig trained under his guidance in his backyard with weights, tires, and sledgehammers. Due to his training and offensive growth, Ludvig was placed on the Portland Winterhawks protected list at the age of 16.

=== Major junior ===
Leading up to the 2018 NHL entry draft, Ludvig was ranked 48th overall North American defenseman by the NHL Central Scouting Bureau. He was eventually drafted in 69th overall by the Florida Panthers on June 22, 2019, but was among the last of his family to find out due to the numerous messages and phone calls spamming his phone. Following the draft, he was invited to their Development Camp. Upon returning to the Winterhawks for the 2019–20 season, Ludvig was named the Winterhawks' 44th captain in team history. During his final season with the Winterhawks, Ludvig recorded 17 goals, fourth best among WHL defensemen, and 45 assists in 60 games and was selected for the WHL's Western Conference First All-Star Team. He was also credited by the Panthers for his physicality and penalty killing skills, along with success on the power play. Ludvig concluded his major junior career by signing an entry-level contract with the Panthers on March 30, 2020.

=== Professional ===
Following his major junior career, Ludvig joined the Florida Panthers Development Camp but was reassigned to their American Hockey League (AHL) affiliate, the Syracuse Crunch. While sports were paused due to the COVID-19 pandemic, Ludvig and his sister worked out together around five days a week with a trainer, including cardio sessions on the weekends. Upon returning the Crunch for the 2020–21 season, Ludvig led all team defencemen in scoring with two goals and eight points in 13 games. He recorded his first professional goal, the game-winner, on March 1 against the Rochester Americans. On July 17, 2023, he signed a two-year, two-way contract with the Florida Panthers. Later in the year, on October 9, 2023, he was claimed off waivers by the Pittsburgh Penguins. On October 24, Ludvig made his NHL debut with the Pittsburgh Penguins in a 4–1 loss against the Dallas Stars. Remaining with Pittsburgh for the majority of the season, Ludvig was primarily used in a depth role as the team's seventh defenseman. On February 14, 2024, Ludvig scored his first NHL goal in a home loss against former draft club, the Florida Panthers. With the Penguins missing the post-season for the second year in a row, he finished with 3 goals and 5 points through 33 regular season appearances.

Approaching the 2024–25 season, Ludvig for the second consecutive season was placed on waivers during pre-season and left the Penguins after he was claimed by the Colorado Avalanche on October 5, 2024.

Leaving the Avalanche at the conclusion of his contract, Ludvig as a free agent opted to pursue a career in his birthplace in the Czech Republic, signing a three-year contract with HC Dynamo Pardubice of the ELH on July 23, 2025. By signing with Dynamo he joined his father Jan, employed as the teams skills coach.

== Career statistics ==
			Regular season					Playoffs
Season	Team	League	GP	G	A	Pts	PIM	GP	G	A	Pts	PIM
2016–17	Kamloops Storm	KIJHL	17	5	10	15	67	11	1	7	8	20
2017–18	Portland Winterhawks	WHL	51	2	5	7	43	11	1	2	3	21
2018–19	Portland Winterhawks	WHL	58	5	13	18	77	3	0	1	1	7
2019–20	Portland Winterhawks	WHL	60	17	45	62	57	—	—	—	—	—
2020–21	Syracuse Crunch	AHL	13	2	6	8	13	—	—	—	—	—
2021–22	Charlotte Checkers	AHL	3	0	0	0	0	3	0	0	0	0
2022–23	Charlotte Checkers	AHL	54	3	14	17	72	7	0	2	2	4
2023–24	Pittsburgh Penguins	NHL	33	3	2	5	47	—	—	—	—	—
2023–24	Wilkes-Barre/Scranton Penguins	AHL	4	0	0	0	2	—	—	—	—	—
2024–25	Colorado Avalanche	NHL	8	0	2	2	6	—	—	—	—	—
2024–25	Colorado Eagles	AHL	31	1	11	12	20	9	2	2	4	10
2025–26	HC Dynamo Pardubice	ELH	44	3	10	13	93	16	1	6	7	8
NHL totals			41	3	4	7	53	—	—	—	—	—
ELH totals			44	3	10	13	93	16	1	6	7	8

== Awards and honours ==
Award	Year	Ref
WHL
Eastern Conference First All-Star Team	2020	
