= Radovan Biegl =

Czech ice hockey goaltenders

- Born: May 13, 1969 (age 56) Hradec Králové, Czechoslovakia
- Height: 5 ft 10 in (178 cm)
- Weight: 150 lb (68 kg; 10 st 10 lb)
- Position: Goaltender
- Caught: Right
- Played for: HC Pardubice; ASD Dukla Jihlava; HC Zelézárny Třinec; HC Slovan Bratislava; HC Havířov; HC Vsetín; HC Zlin
- National team: Czech Republic
- Playing career: 1987–2015

Radovan Biegl (born May 13, 1969) is a Czech former professional ice hockey goaltender.

Biegl played in the Czechoslovak First Ice Hockey League and the Czech Extraliga for HC Pardubice, ASD Dukla Jihlava, HC Zelézárny Třinec, HC Havířov, HC Vsetín and HC Zlin. He also played one season in the Tipsport Liga for HC Slovan Bratislava during the 1999–2000 season, where he won a league championship and was named into the league's All-Star team.
