= Miloš Kelemen =

Slovak ice hockey player (born 1999)

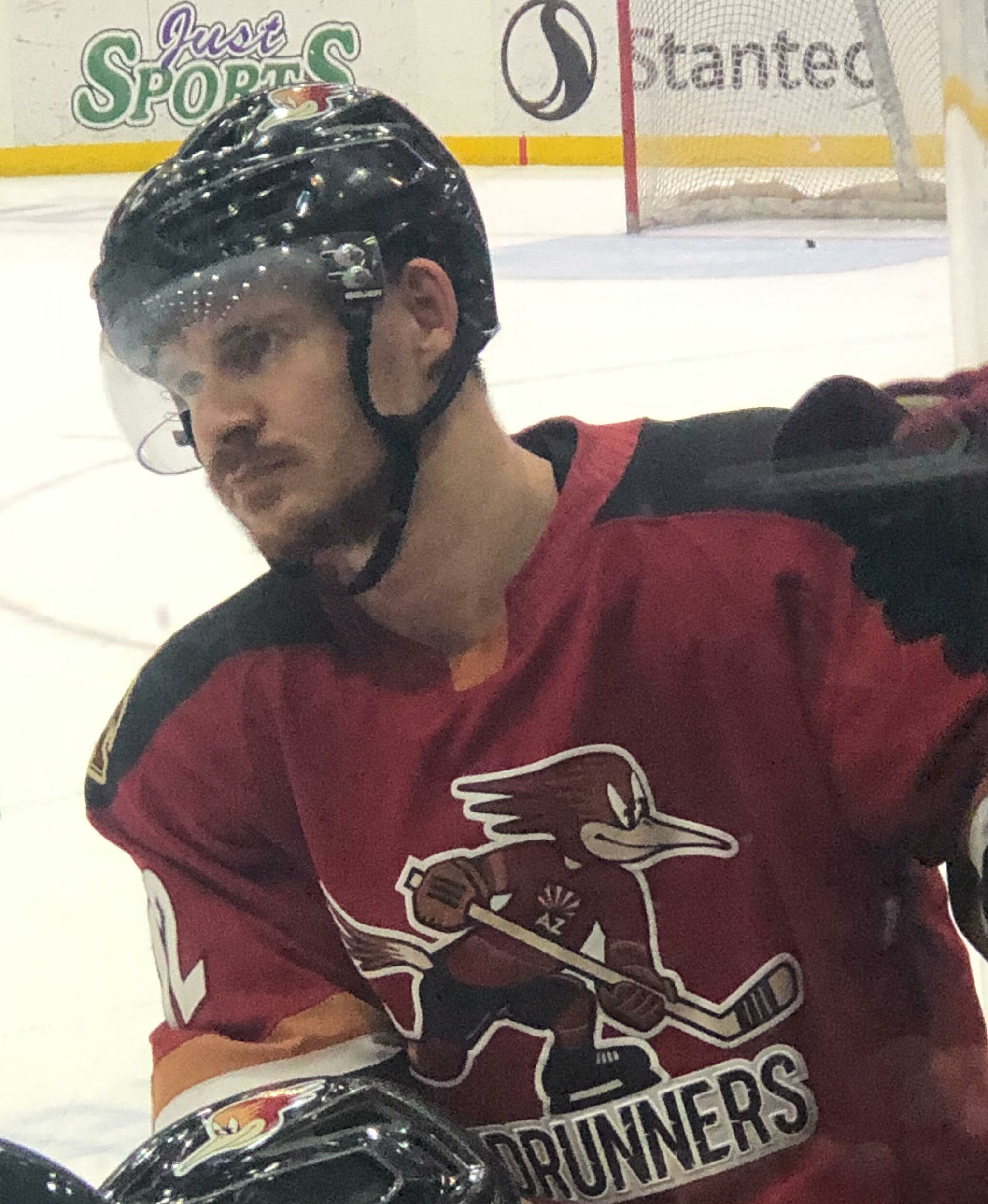
- Kelemen with the Tucson Roadrunners in 2023
- Born: 6 July 1999 (age 27) Lučenec, Slovakia
- Height: 6 ft 2 in (188 cm)
- Weight: 218 lb (99 kg; 15 st 8 lb)
- Position: Left wing
- Shoots: Left
- ELH team Former teams: HC Dynamo Pardubice; HKM Zvolen; HK Orange 20; HC Slovan Bratislava; BK Mladá Boleslav; Arizona Coyotes
- National team: Slovakia
- NHL draft: Undrafted
- Playing career: 2016–present

Miloš Kelemen (born 6 July 1999) is a Slovak professional ice hockey player who is a left winger for HC Dynamo Pardubice of the Czech Extraliga (ELH).

== Playing career ==
Kelemen was a member of HKM Zvolen's academy of the Slovak Extraliga before making his professional debut for the team during the 2016–17 season. On 2 July 2018, he signed for HC Slovan Bratislava of the Kontinental Hockey League (KHL) but would play just two games during the 2018–19 KHL season before returning to HKM Zvolen. Kelemen signed a new contract with Zvolen on 17 June 2020. In the following 2020–21 season, Kelemen enjoyed a breakout season in recording career-high marks of 19 goals and 19 assists for 38 points in 45 regular season games. He contributed six post-season goals through 11 games to help HKM Zvolen claim the championship.

On 1 May 2021, Kelemen left Zvolen to continue his development and signed a contract with Czech Extraliga (ELH) outfit, BK Mladá Boleslav. Quickly adjusting to the ELH in the 2021–22 season, using his size and scoring touch, Kelemen notched five goals and 18 points through 44 regular season games. He increased his production in the playoffs, helping Mladá Boleslav reach the semi-finals and finishing with nine goals and 12 points in just 14 post-season games. In recognition of his impressive year, Kelemen was selected as the Czech Extraliga's Rookie of the Year.

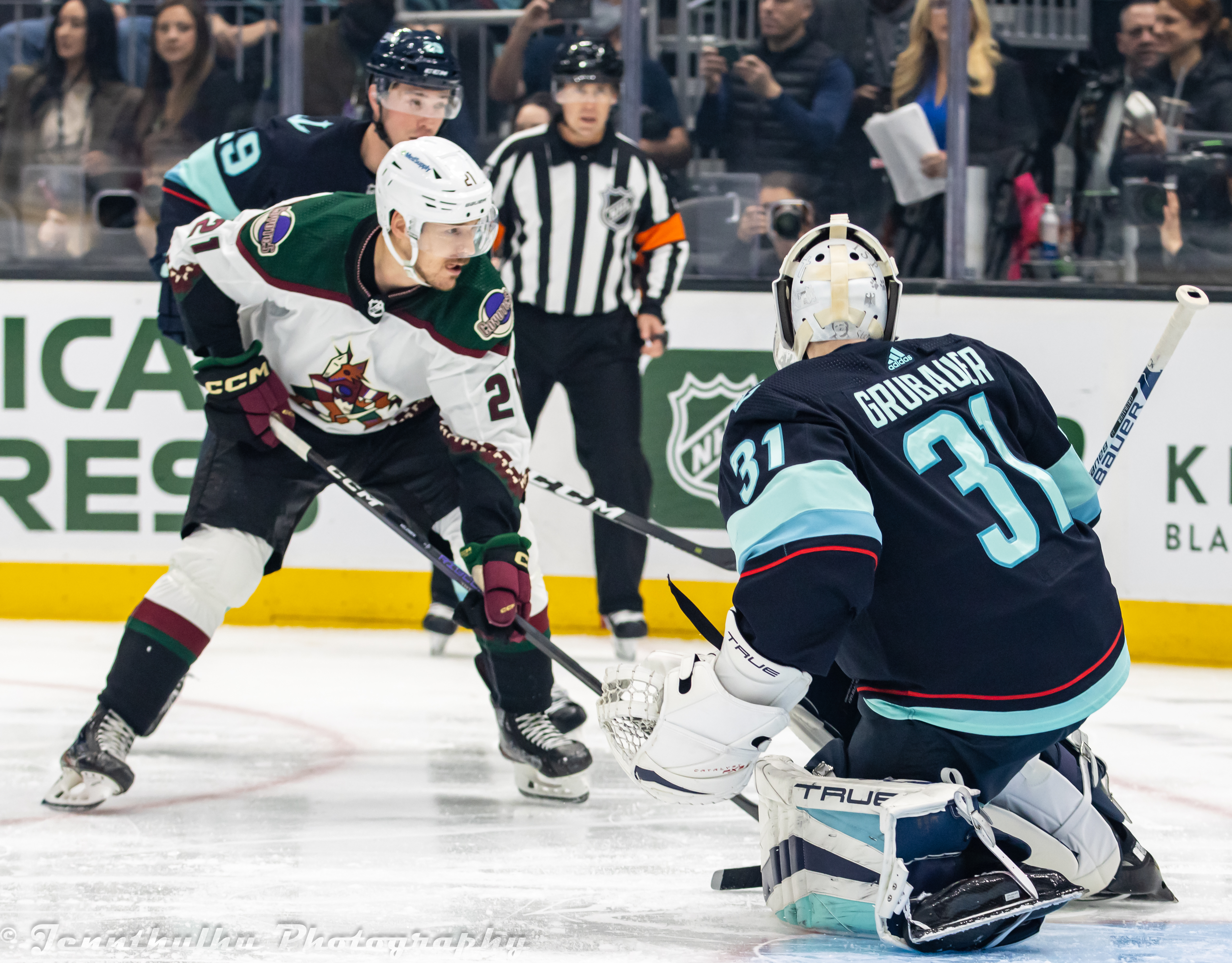
Kelemen in action against the Seattle Kraken in 2023

On 6 May 2022, Kelemen as an undrafted free agent, was signed to a two-year, entry-level contract with the Arizona Coyotes of the National Hockey League (NHL). Kelemen began the 2022–23 season with Arizona's American Hockey League affiliate, the Tucson Roadrunners. On 19 November 2022, he scored a hat trick against the San Jose Barracuda. Arizona recalled Kelemen in January 2023 and he made his NHL debut versus the Anaheim Ducks on 24 January. Kelemen scored his first NHL goal against Kaapo Kähkönen in a 7–2 loss to the San Jose Sharks on 1 April. He played in 14 games for the Coyotes, scoring the one goal.

Kelemen began the 2023–24 season with Tucson. He was recalled by Arizona on 13 November 2023. He made his NHL season debut on 18 November playing on the fourth line with Alex Kerfoot and Liam O'Brien. He registered his first point of the NHL season on December 11, assisting on Michael Kesselring's second period goal in a 5–2 loss to the Buffalo Sabres. He was returned to Tucson in December having played in ten games, recording just the one point. Shortly after the end of the 2023–24 regular season, the Coyotes' franchise was suspended and team assets were subsequently transferred to the expansion Utah Hockey Club; as a result, Kelemen became a member of the Utah team.

On 3 July 2024, Kelemen signed a one-year, two-way contract with Utah. To start the 2024–25 season, he was assigned to continue his tenure with the Roadrunners. He made 11 appearances and posted six points before being loaned by Utah to HC Dynamo Pardubice of the Czech Extraliga on 26 November 2024.

== International play ==
Medal record

Representing Slovakia

Ice hockey

Olympic Games
Bronze medal – third place	2022 Beijing	

He was selected to make his full IIHF international debut, participating for Slovakia in the 2021 IIHF World Championship. Kelemen was named to Slovakia's 2022 Winter Olympics hockey team and played in seven games as the team won the bronze medal. He also played for Slovakia at the 2023 IIHF World Championship.

== Career statistics ==
=== Regular season and playoffs ===
			Regular season					Playoffs
Season	Team	League	GP	G	A	Pts	PIM	GP	G	A	Pts	PIM
2013–14	HKM Zvolen	SVK U18	19	2	2	4	6	6	1	2	3	2
2014–15	HKM Zvolen	SVK U18	32	13	14	27	24	—	—	—	—	—
2015–16	HKM Zvolen	SVK U18	16	13	10	23	20	7	6	6	12	4
2015–16	HKM Zvolen	SVK U20	20	7	3	10	16	—	—	—	—	—
2016–17	HKM Zvolen	SVK U20	8	4	5	9	0	5	1	2	3	6
2016–17	HKM Zvolen	Slovak	23	2	2	4	4	6	0	0	0	0
2016–17	HKM Zvolen	SVK U18	—	—	—	—	—	1	0	1	1	0
2017–18	HKM Zvolen	SVK U20	12	8	14	22	8	—	—	—	—	—
2017–18	HKM Zvolen	Slovak	10	0	1	1	2	10	2	2	4	10
2017–18	HK Orange 20	Slovak	21	2	1	3	14	—	—	—	—	—
2017–18	HK Orange 20	SVK.2	2	2	2	4	2	—	—	—	—	—
2018–19	HC Slovan Bratislava	KHL	2	0	0	0	2	—	—	—	—	—
2018–19	HKM Zvolen	SVK.2 U20	4	3	6	9	0	—	—	—	—	—
2018–19	HKM Zvolen	Slovak	16	1	5	6	8	12	1	1	2	8
2019–20	HKM Zvolen	Slovak	48	9	9	18	20	—	—	—	—	—
2020–21	HKM Zvolen	Slovak	45	19	19	38	60	11	6	0	6	16
2021–22	BK Mladá Boleslav	ELH	44	5	13	18	12	14	9	3	12	14
2022–23	Tucson Roadrunners	AHL	59	14	16	30	37	3	1	0	1	2
2022–23	Arizona Coyotes	NHL	14	1	0	1	23	—	—	—	—	—
2023–24	Tucson Roadrunners	AHL	54	16	16	32	67	2	0	0	0	0
2023–24	Arizona Coyotes	NHL	10	0	1	1	0	—	—	—	—	—
2024–25	Tucson Roadrunners	AHL	11	1	5	6	20	—	—	—	—	—
2024–25	HC Dynamo Pardubice	ELH	25	7	3	10	12	14	3	0	3	2
2025–26	HC Dynamo Pardubice	ELH	49	6	7	13	66	17	3	5	8	2
Slovak totals			163	33	37	70	108	39	9	3	12	34
NHL totals			24	1	1	2	23	—	—	—	—	—

=== International ===
Year	Team	Event	Result	GP	G	A	Pts	PIM
2016	Slovakia	IH18	7th	4	0	0	0	0
2018	Slovakia	WJC	7th	5	0	1	1	2
2019	Slovakia	WJC	8th	5	0	2	2	2
2021	Slovakia	WC	8th	6	1	0	1	2
2021	Slovakia	OGQ	Q	1	0	0	0	0
2022	Slovakia	OG	3rd place, bronze medalist(s)	7	0	1	1	4
2023	Slovakia	WC	9th	7	0	1	1	2
2024	Slovakia	WC	7th	8	3	2	5	12
2024	Slovakia	OGQ	Q	3	1	1	2	0
2026	Slovakia	OG	4th	6	1	1	2	4
Junior totals				14	0	3	3	4
Senior totals				34	5	5	10	24

== Awards and honors ==
Award	Year
Slovak
Champion (HKM Zvolen)	2021
ELH
Rookie of the Year	2022
