= Roman Will =

Czech ice hockey player (born 1992)

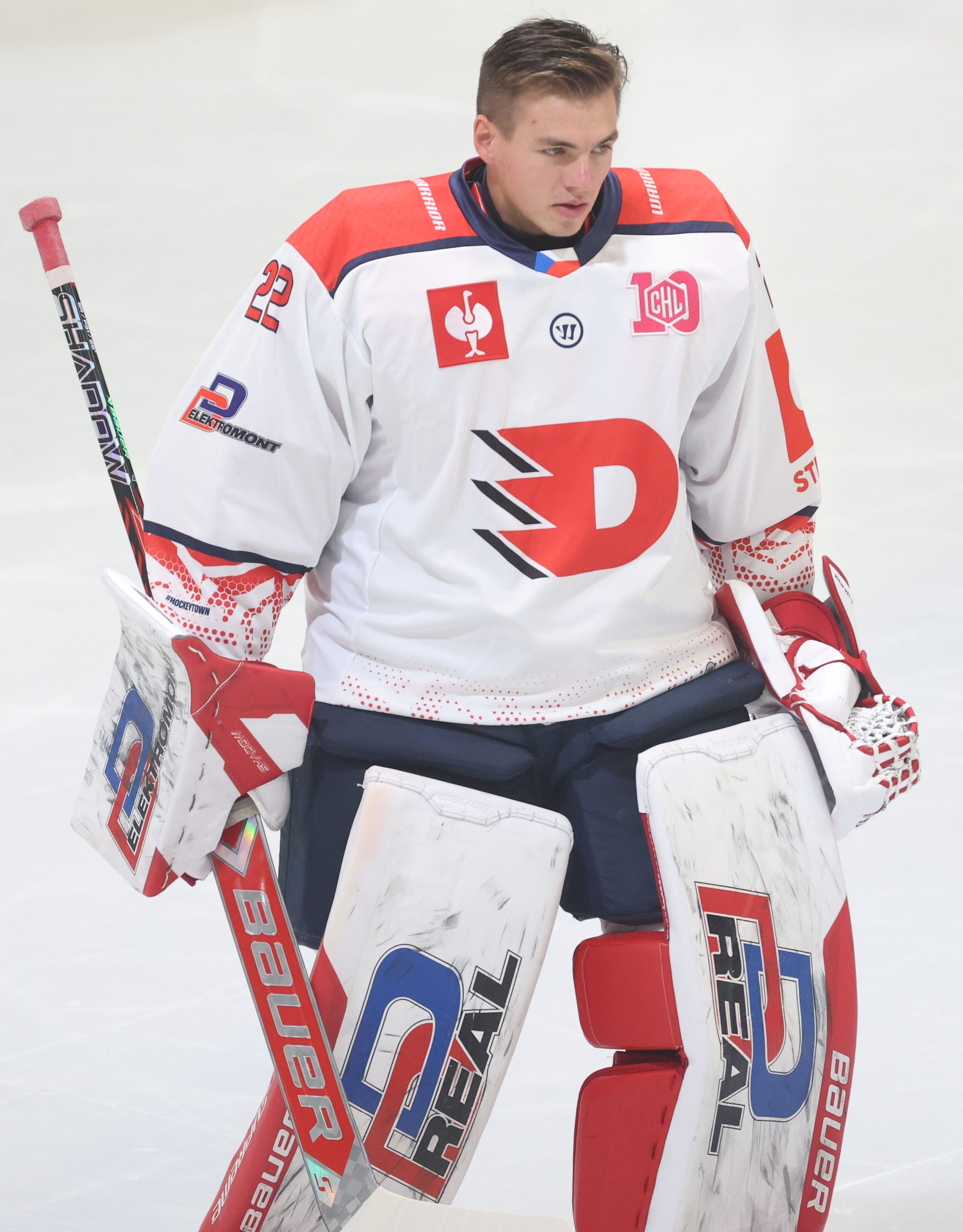
- Will with HC Dynamo Pardubice in 2024
- Born: 22 May 1992 (age 34) Plzeň, Czechoslovakia
- Height: 6 ft 1 in (185 cm)
- Weight: 194 lb (88 kg; 13 st 12 lb)
- Position: Goaltender
- Catches: Left
- ELH team Former teams: HC Dynamo Pardubice; BK Mladá Boleslav; Colorado Avalanche; HC Bílí Tygři Liberec; Rögle BK; Traktor Chelyabinsk
- National team: Czech Republic
- NHL draft: Undrafted
- Playing career: 2011–present

Roman Will (born 22 May 1992) is a Czech professional ice hockey goaltender currently playing with HC Dynamo Pardubice of the Czech Extraliga (ELH). He has formerly appeared in the National Hockey League (NHL) with the Colorado Avalanche.

== Playing career ==
As a youth, Will played with BK Mladá Boleslav and later made his professional debut in a Czech Extraliga relegation game after the 2010–11 season. With an ambition to be drafted and play in the NHL, Will was drafted 29th overall by the Moncton Wildcats in the 2011 CHL Import Draft and subsequently moved to North America for a season of major junior hockey with the Wildcats of the Quebec Major Junior Hockey League in 2011–12. As the Wildcats starter, Will appeared in 63 games for 29 wins and was selected to the 2012 QMJHL First All-Star Team.

Undrafted, Will returned to the Czech Republic, signing a two-year contract to newly relegated BK Mladá Boleslav of the 1. národní hokejová liga. In the 2012–13 season, Will shared starting duties and appeared in 44 games. Although just a 20-year-old, he led the league with a 1.87 goals against average.

After helping Boleslav gain promotion back to the Extraliga, he was re-signed to a one-year contract on 2 May 2014. However, on 15 May 2014, Will's NHL ambition was further realized when he was signed to a two-year entry-level contract with the Colorado Avalanche.

In his first North American season in 2014–15, Will was initially assigned to back up the Avalanche's AHL affiliate, the Lake Erie Monsters. He made his debut with the Monsters on 17 October 2014 against the Chicago Wolves. He later recorded his first career AHL win against the Toronto Marlies on 30 November 2014, before he was assigned to earn more time in the crease with secondary affiliate, the Fort Wayne Komets of the ECHL. Will shone with the Komets and earned his first accolade as the ECHL's goaltender of the week from 5 January 2015. He recorded 17 wins in 29 games, leading all rookies in goals against average, and played in all seven post-season games with Fort Wayne to be selected in the ECHL All-Rookie Team.

In the following 2015–16 season, after attending his second Avalanche training camp, Will was assigned to new AHL affiliate, the San Antonio Rampage. On 26 January 2015, with the Rampage's starting Goaltender Calvin Pickard already promoted to the NHL, Will was recalled to the Avalanche on an emergency basis to backup Pickard due to unavailability with starter Semyon Varlamov. With Pickard struggling with illness, Will made his NHL debut in relief with the Avalanche that same night, appearing in 18 minutes of ice time and stopping 2 of 3 shots in a 6–1 defeat to the San Jose Sharks. Will was returned to the Rampage following the game on 29 January 2016.

After his second professional North American season, Will, in search of more playing time, left the Avalanche organization to return to the Czech Republic in agreeing to an optional two-year deal with HC Bílí Tygři Liberec of the Czech Extraliga on 10 May 2016.

Will matured and performed as a standout statistically for three seasons in the Extraliga with Bílí Tygři Liberec. Following the 2018–19 season, Will left the Czech Republic as a free agent and agreed to a two-year contract with Swedish club, Rögle BK of the Swedish Hockey League, on 9 May 2019. Securing the role as starting goaltender, Will registered an impressive 23 wins from 34 games, helping Rögle finish the regular season in third place, their highest position in franchise history.

On 15 April 2020, Will was released from his contract with Rögle to take up a lucrative two-year offer from Russian club, Traktor Chelyabinsk of the Kontinental Hockey League (KHL).

After two largely successful seasons as Traktor's starting goaltender, Will left Russia at the conclusion of his contract and returned to his native homeland, agreeing to a three-year contract with HC Dynamo Pardubice of the ELH on 10 May 2022.

== Career statistics ==
=== Regular season and playoffs ===
			Regular season									Playoffs
Season	Team	League	GP	W	L	OT	MIN	GA	SO	GAA	SV%	GP	W	L	MIN	GA	SO	GAA	SV%
2011–12	Moncton Wildcats	QMJHL	63	29	25	7	3592	166	1	2.77	.913	4	0	4	205	19	0	5.56	.843
2012–13	BK Mladá Boleslav	Czech.1	44	33	11	0	2536	79	6	1.87	.935	10	8	2	630	15	1	1.43	.952
2013–14	BK Mladá Boleslav	Czech.1	20	16	4	0	1204	37	5	1.84	.929	10	8	2	596	18	2	1.81	.920
2014–15	Lake Erie Monsters	AHL	11	2	6	1	576	34	0	3.54	.869	—	—	—	—	—	—	—	—
2014–15	Fort Wayne Komets	ECHL	29	17	8	4	1745	70	1	2.41	.921	7	4	3	417	19	1	2.74	.914
2015–16	San Antonio Rampage	AHL	29	10	13	3	1527	87	0	3.42	.896	—	—	—	—	—	—	—	—
2015–16	Colorado Avalanche	NHL	1	0	0	0	18	1	0	3.25	.667	—	—	—	—	—	—	—	—
2016–17	HC Bílí Tygři Liberec	ELH	30	17	13	0	1772	50	7	1.69	.935	7	3	4	296	10	2	2.03	.914
2016–17	HC Benátky nad Jizerou	Czech.1	5	2	3	0	307	14	1	2.74	.923	—	—	—	—	—	—	—	—
2017–18	HC Bílí Tygři Liberec	ELH	45	23	22	0	2536	99	6	2.34	.913	10	6	4	603	17	1	1.69	.941
2018–19	HC Bílí Tygři Liberec	ELH	51	32	19	0	2941	111	5	2.26	.916	17	10	7	1083	34	0	1.88	.929
2019–20	Rögle BK	SHL	34	23	10	0	1985	70	4	2.12	.922	—	—	—	—	—	—	—	—
2020–21	Traktor Chelyabinsk	KHL	37	17	16	3	2060	79	4	2.30	.917	2	0	1	87	2	0	1.37	.951
2021–22	Traktor Chelyabinsk	KHL	39	21	9	7	2262	83	2	2.20	.929	15	9	6	896	32	0	2.14	.925
2022–23	HC Dynamo Pardubice	ELH	39	26	13	0	2335	82	5	2.11	.920	11	7	4	674	22	2	1.96	.911
2023–24	HC Dynamo Pardubice	ELH	39	31	8	0	2353	80	1	2.04	.917	16	10	5	963	31	3	1.93	.922
2024–25	HC Dynamo Pardubice	ELH	37	21	16	0	2169	78	5	2.16	.914	16	11	5	982	28	3	1.71	.930
2025–26	HC Dynamo Pardubice	ELH	38	25	12	0	2259	75	2	1.99	.914	15	10	4	891	32	2	2.15	.929
NHL totals			1	0	0	0	18	1	0	3.25	.667	—	—	—	—	—	—	—	—
KHL totals			76	38	25	10	4,322	162	6	2.25	.923	17	9	7	984	34	0	2.07	.927

=== International ===
Year	Team	Event	Result	GP	W	L	OT	MIN	GA	SO	GAA	SV%
2010	Czech Republic	U18	6th	3	1	0	0	123	10	0	4.89	.796
2021	Czech Republic	WC	7th	3	2	0	0	140	4	0	2.57	.893
Junior totals				3	1	0	0	123	10	0	4.89	.796
Senior totals				3	2	0	0	140	4	0	2.57	.893

== Awards and honours ==
Award	Year
QMJHL
First Team All-Star	2011–12
ECHL
All-Rookie Team	2014–15
