= Libor Hudáček =

Slovak ice hockey player (born 1990)

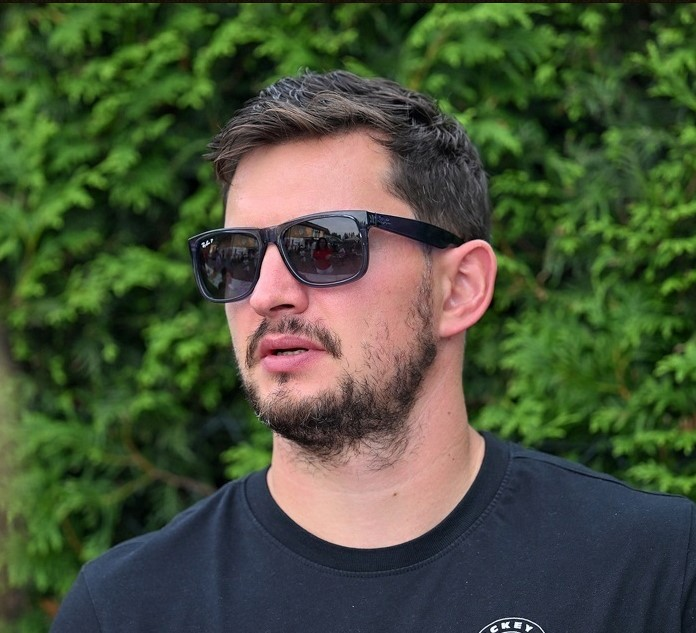
- Hudáček in 2023
- Born: 7 September 1990 (age 35) Levoča, Czechoslovakia
- Height: 5 ft 9 in (175 cm)
- Weight: 172 lb (78 kg; 12 st 4 lb)
- Position: Forward
- Shoots: Right
- ELH team Former teams: HC Oceláři Třinec; HK Spišská Nová Ves; HC Slovan Bratislava; HK Orange 20; HC '05 Banská Bystrica; Örebro HK; Färjestad BK; HC Bílí Tygři Liberec; Neftekhimik Nizhnekamsk; Lausanne HC; HC Lugano; Dinamo Minsk
- National team: Slovakia
- Playing career: 2009–present

Libor Hudáček (Slovak pronunciation: [ˈlibɔr ˈɦudaːtʂek]; born 7 September 1990) is a Slovak professional ice hockey player who is a forward for HC Oceláři Třinec of the Czech Extraliga (ELH). He is the younger brother of Július Hudáček, who is a goaltender.

== Playing career ==
Hudáček began playing junior ice hockey in the HK Spišská Nová Ves. He was a member of the HK Orange 20 project in the 2009–10 season, overall playing 23 games. The rest of the season, he played for the HC Slovan Bratislava. In the 2010–11 season he overall played 55 games and earned 24 points for Slovan. In the next season, he scored the winning goal in the 7th playoffs final game against HC Košice and won the Slovak Extraliga title.

After two seasons with HC Bílí Tygři Liberec in the Czech Extraliga (ELH), Hudáček returned to the KHL as a free agent, signing a one-year contract with Neftekhimik Nizhnekamsk on 21 May 2020.

On 24 February 2021, Hudacek joined Lausanne HC of the National League (NL) on a one-year deal through the end of the 2020–21 season. He hurt his leg in a game against EHC Biel on March 9, 2021, which required surgery, forcing him to sit out the remainder of the season.

On 31 July 2022, Hudáček opted to return to the Czech Republic as a free agent and signed a three-year contract with HC Oceláři Třinec of the ELH.

== International play ==
Medal record

Men's Ice hockey

Representing Slovakia

Olympic Games
Bronze medal – third place	2022 Beijing	

World Championships
Silver medal – second place	2012 Finland/Sweden	

Hudáček participated in the 2008 IIHF World U18 Championships and the 2010 World Junior Ice Hockey Championships. He played for Slovakia at the 2012 IIHF World Championship, earning 5 points in 10 games. He won the silver medal at the 2012 World Championship.

== Career statistics ==
=== Regular season and playoffs ===
			Regular season					Playoffs
Season	Team	League	GP	G	A	Pts	PIM	GP	G	A	Pts	PIM
2006–07	HK Spišská Nová Ves	SVK U18	41	29	37	66	66	—	—	—	—	—
2006–07	HK Spišská Nová Ves	SVK U20	3	0	1	1	2	—	—	—	—	—
2007–08	HK Spišská Nová Ves	SVK.2 U18	10	13	19	32	22	—	—	—	—	—
2007–08	HK Spišská Nová Ves	SVK U20	36	14	16	30	45	2	2	0	2	2
2008–09	HK Spišská Nová Ves	SVK U20	28	21	37	58	18	—	—	—	—	—
2008–09	HK Spišská Nová Ves	SVK.2	31	15	14	29	28	15	4	4	8	8
2009–10	HC Slovan Bratislava	SVK	18	4	7	11	6	14	1	1	2	10
2009–10	HK Orange 20	SVK	23	8	7	15	8	—	—	—	—	—
2010–11	HC Slovan Bratislava	SVK	55	6	18	24	51	7	1	2	3	4
2011–12	HC Slovan Bratislava	SVK	50	12	21	33	34	19	6	9	15	32
2012–13	HC Slovan Bratislava	KHL	48	11	9	20	12	4	0	2	2	0
2013–14	HC Slovan Bratislava	KHL	54	5	11	16	14	—	—	—	—	—
2014–15	HC Slovan Bratislava	KHL	45	10	10	20	20	—	—	—	—	—
2014–15	HC ’05 iClinic Banská Bystrica	SVK	11	6	4	10	4	—	—	—	—	—
2015–16	Örebro HK	SHL	48	14	14	28	42	2	0	0	0	2
2016–17	Örebro HK	SHL	49	14	24	38	38	—	—	—	—	—
2017–18	Örebro HK	SHL	33	5	10	15	39	—	—	—	—	—
2017–18	Färjestad BK	SHL	5	1	1	2	25	—	—	—	—	—
2018–19	Bílí Tygři Liberec	ELH	52	17	22	39	18	17	3	4	7	10
2019–20	Bílí Tygři Liberec	ELH	50	31	29	60	24	—	—	—	—	—
2020–21	Neftekhimik Nizhnekamsk	KHL	50	17	21	38	26	—	—	—	—	—
2020–21	Lausanne HC	NL	4	2	1	3	2	—	—	—	—	—
2021–22	Neftekhimik Nizhnekamsk	KHL	11	0	3	3	2	—	—	—	—	—
2021–22	Izhstal Izhevsk	VHL	1	0	1	1	0	—	—	—	—	—
2021–22	HC Lugano	NL	10	8	0	8	10	—	—	—	—	—
2021–22	Dinamo Minsk	KHL	3	2	1	3	0	3	0	1	1	6
2022–23	HC Oceláři Třinec	ELH	48	20	12	32	22	19	6	5	11	14
2023–24	HC Oceláři Třinec	ELH	29	12	12	24	12	21	6	10	16	12
2024–25	HC Oceláři Třinec	ELH	40	11	19	30	20	9	0	2	2	10
2025–26	HC Oceláři Třinec	ELH	51	17	27	44	51	19	7	7	14	35
SVK totals			157	36	57	93	103	37	11	9	20	46
KHL totals			211	45	55	100	74	7	0	3	3	6
ELH totals			270	108	121	229	147	85	22	28	50	81

=== International ===
Year	Team	Event	Result	GP	G	A	Pts	PIM
2008	Slovakia	WJC18	7th	6	0	3	3	8
2010	Slovakia	WJC	8th	6	0	2	2	2
2012	Slovakia	WC	2nd place, silver medalist(s)	10	2	3	5	0
2013	Slovakia	WC	8th	8	1	2	3	4
2015	Slovakia	WC	9th	7	0	5	5	4
2016	Slovakia	WC	9th	7	1	2	3	6
2017	Slovakia	WC	14th	7	2	1	3	6
2019	Slovakia	WC	9th	5	2	0	2	4
2021	Slovakia	OGQ	Q	3	3	1	4	2
2022	Slovakia	OG	3rd place, bronze medalist(s)	7	1	2	3	4
2023	Slovakia	WC	9th	7	0	1	1	33
2024	Slovakia	WC	7th	8	5	5	10	0
2024	Slovakia	OGQ	Q	3	1	0	1	0
2026	Slovakia	OG	4th	6	1	1	2	0
Junior totals				12	0	5	5	10
Senior totals				78	19	23	42	63
