= Jan Ludvig =

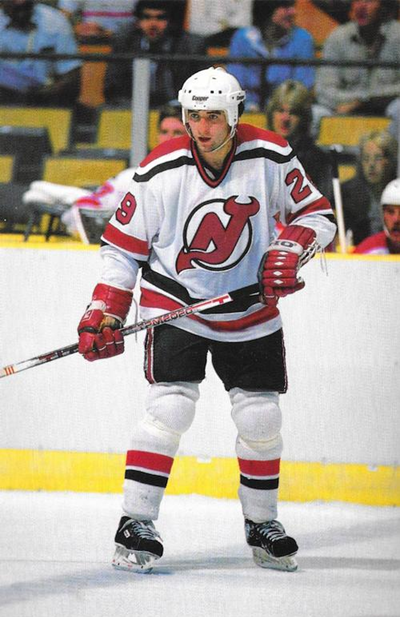
- Born: September 17, 1961 (age 64) Liberec, Czechoslovakia
- Height: 5 ft 10 in (178 cm)
- Weight: 190 lb (86 kg; 13 st 8 lb)
- Position: Right wing
- Shot: Right
- Played for: New Jersey Devils; Buffalo Sabres
- NHL draft: Undrafted
- Playing career: 1982–1989

Jan Ludvig (born September 17, 1961) is a Czech former professional ice hockey forward. He played in the National Hockey League with the New Jersey Devils and Buffalo Sabres. His son, John Ludvig, also plays professional ice hockey. He has two other sons, Jake and Mick, and two daughters, Dasha and Katie.

In his NHL career, Ludvig appeared in 314 games. He scored 54 goals and added 87 assists. Ludvig is currently a scout with the Boston Bruins and runs an ice rink.

In 2008 Ludvig competed in the Erzberg Rodeo for the first time, competing seven times through the 2014 event. He plans to return in 2016 to the Iron Giant.

== Career statistics ==
=== Regular season and playoffs ===
| | | | Regular season | | | | | Playoffs |
| Season | Team | League | GP | G | A | Pts | PIM | GP | G | A | Pts | PIM |
|---|---|---|---|---|---|---|---|---|---|---|---|---|
| 1980–81 | TJ CHZ Litvínov | TCH | 3 | 0 | 0 | 0 | 0 | — | — | — | — | — |
| 1981–82 | Kamloops Junior Oilers | WHL | 37 | 31 | 34 | 65 | 36 | 4 | 2 | 0 | 2 | 7 |
| 1981–82 | Wichita Wind | CHL | — | — | — | — | — | 3 | 2 | 0 | 2 | 0 |
| 1982–83 | New Jersey Devils | NHL | 51 | 7 | 10 | 17 | 30 | — | — | — | — | — |
| 1982–83 | Wichita Wind | CHL | 9 | 3 | 0 | 3 | 19 | — | — | — | — | — |
| 1983–84 | New Jersey Devils | NHL | 74 | 22 | 32 | 54 | 70 | — | — | — | — | — |
| 1984–85 | New Jersey Devils | NHL | 74 | 12 | 19 | 31 | 53 | — | — | — | — | — |
| 1985–86 | New Jersey Devils | NHL | 42 | 5 | 9 | 14 | 63 | — | — | — | — | — |
| 1986–87 | New Jersey Devils | NHL | 47 | 7 | 9 | 16 | 98 | — | — | — | — | — |
| 1986–87 | Maine Mariners | AHL | 14 | 6 | 4 | 10 | 46 | — | — | — | — | — |
| 1987–88 | Buffalo Sabres | NHL | 13 | 1 | 6 | 7 | 65 | — | — | — | — | — |
| 1988–89 | Buffalo Sabres | NHL | 13 | 0 | 2 | 2 | 39 | — | — | — | — | — |
| 2001–02 | Bílí Tygři Liberec | CZE.2 | 6 | 0 | 1 | 1 | 29 | — | — | — | — | — |
| NHL totals | | | 314 | 54 | 87 | 141 | 418 | — | — | — | — | — |

=== International ===
| Year | Team | Event | Result | GP | G | A | Pts | PIM |
|---|---|---|---|---|---|---|---|---|
| 1979 | Czechoslovakia | EJC | 2nd place, silver medalist(s) | 5 | 5 | 0 | 5 | 8 |
