= Petr Koblasa =

Czech ice hockey player

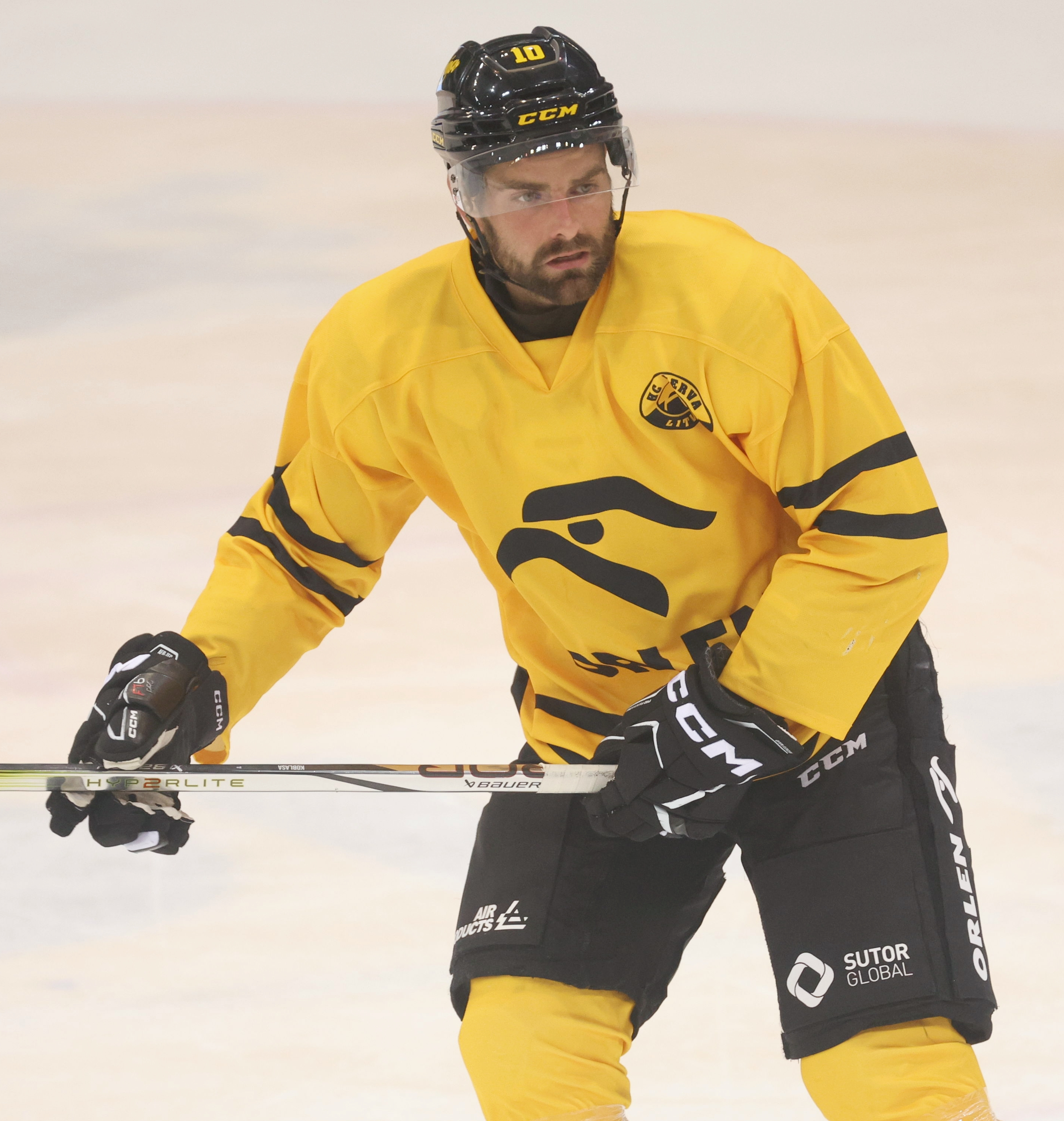
- Petr Koblasa, 2024
- Born: November 7, 1993 (age 32) Karlovy Vary, Czech Republic
- Height: 6 ft 1 in (185 cm)
- Weight: 201 lb (91 kg; 14 st 5 lb)
- Position: Forward
- Shoots: Right
- ELH team Former teams: HC Litvínov; HC Energie Karlovy Vary; Piráti Chomutov
- Playing career: 2011–present

Petr Koblasa (born November 7, 1993) is a Czech professional ice hockey player. He is currently playing for HC Verva Litvínov of the Czech Extraliga (ELH).

Koblasa made his Czech Extraliga debut playing with HC Energie Karlovy Vary during the 2011–12 Czech Extraliga season.
