= David Kaše =

Czech ice hockey player

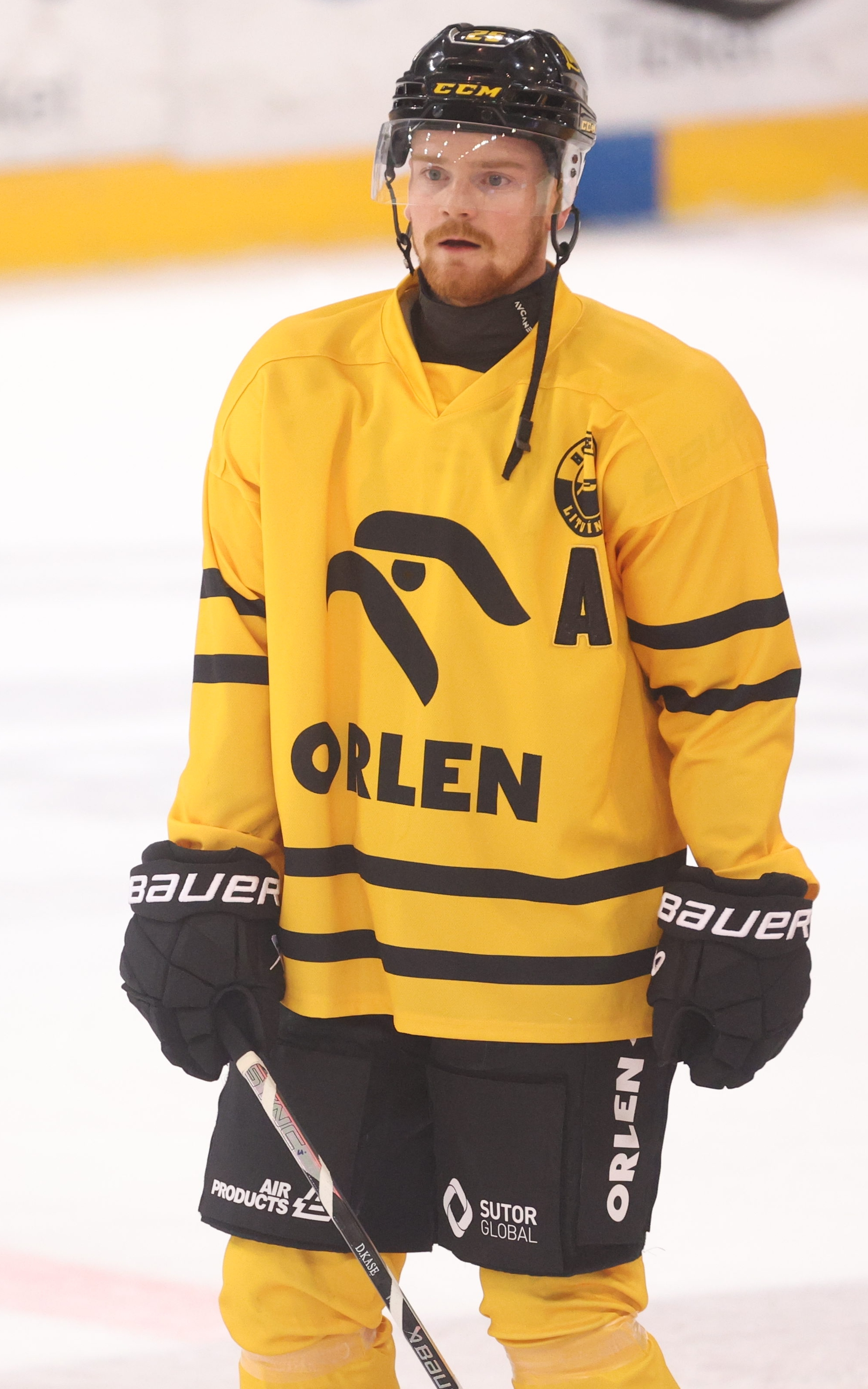
- David Kaše, 2024
- Born: 28 January 1997 (age 29) Kadaň, Czech Republic
- Height: 5 ft 11 in (180 cm)
- Weight: 169 lb (77 kg; 12 st 1 lb)
- Position: Forward
- Shoots: Left
- ELH team Former teams: HC Litvinov; Piráti Chomutov; Mora IK; Philadelphia Flyers; HC Karlovy Vary; HC Sparta Praha
- NHL draft: 128th overall, 2015; Philadelphia Flyers
- Playing career: 2014–present

David Kaše (born 28 January 1997) is a Czech professional ice hockey forward currently under contract with HC Litvinov of the Czech Extraliga (ELH). He previously played for the Philadelphia Flyers of the National Hockey League (NHL). Kaše was drafted in the fifth-round of the 2015 NHL entry draft, 128th overall by the Flyers.

== Playing career ==
Kaše made his Czech Extraliga debut playing with Piráti Chomutov during the 2015–16 Czech Extraliga season. He later transferred as a free agent to continue his development with Mora IK of the Swedish Hockey League.

On 5 May 2018, Kaše agreed to a three-year, entry-level contract with the Philadelphia Flyers. Ahead of the 2018–19 season, Kaše was assigned to the Lehigh Valley Phantoms, the American Hockey League affiliate of the Flyers.

In the 2019–20 season, Kaše scored his first NHL goal with the Flyers on 17 December 2019, in the second period of a game against the Anaheim Ducks.

On 12 August 2020, Kaše was loaned by the Flyers to return to the Czech Extraliga with HC Karlovy Vary until the commencement of the delayed 2020–21 North American season. He returned to North America for the remainder of the 2020–21 season, playing most of his games with the Lehigh Valley Phantoms and only one with the Flyers.

On 25 May 2021, Kaše returned to his native Czech Republic, after signing a two-year contract with ELH club, HC Sparta Praha.

== Personal ==
His older brother, Ondřej, is also a hockey player.

== Career statistics ==
=== Regular season and playoffs ===
			Regular season					Playoffs
Season	Team	League	GP	G	A	Pts	PIM	GP	G	A	Pts	PIM
2012–13	KLH Chomutov	Czech20	4	0	1	1	0	—	—	—	—	—
2013–14	KLH Chomutov	Czech20	35	11	19	30	10	11	2	1	3	8
2014–15	KLH Chomutov	Czech20	8	7	8	15	2	9	5	7	12	12
2014–15	Piráti Chomutov	Czech.1	30	7	7	14	10	1	0	0	0	0
2015–16	KLH Chomutov	Czech20	1	0	1	1	0	2	1	3	4	2
2015–16	Piráti Chomutov	ELH	30	1	1	2	2	8	1	1	2	2
2015–16	SK Kadaň	Czech.1	16	6	8	14	6	—	—	—	—	—
2016–17	Piráti Chomutov	ELH	32	3	6	9	8	15	2	4	6	4
2016–17	SK Kadaň	Czech.1	8	4	3	7	0	—	—	—	—	—
2017–18	Mora IK	SHL	44	9	14	23	6	—	—	—	—	—
2018–19	Lehigh Valley Phantoms	AHL	40	8	15	23	10	—	—	—	—	—
2019–20	Lehigh Valley Phantoms	AHL	51	7	12	19	14	—	—	—	—	—
2019–20	Philadelphia Flyers	NHL	6	1	0	1	0	—	—	—	—	—
2020–21	HC Karlovy Vary	ELH	27	6	19	25	12	—	—	—	—	—
2020–21	Lehigh Valley Phantoms	AHL	19	3	6	9	8	—	—	—	—	—
2020–21	Philadelphia Flyers	NHL	1	0	0	0	0	—	—	—	—	—
2021–22	HC Sparta Praha	ELH	43	4	19	23	16	8	1	1	2	10
2022–23	HC Sparta Praha	ELH	25	6	8	14	8	6	1	1	2	2
2023–24	HC Litvínov	ELH	49	14	29	43	34	13	3	5	8	10
ELH totals			206	34	82	116	80	50	8	12	20	28
SHL totals			44	9	14	23	6	—	—	—	—	—
NHL totals			7	1	0	1	0	—	—	—	—	—

=== International ===
Year	Team	Event	Result	GP	G	A	Pts	PIM
2014	Czech Republic	U17	7th	5	4	2	6	0
2014	Czech Republic	IH18	2nd place, silver medalist(s)	5	1	1	2	4
2014	Czech Republic	WJC18	2nd place, silver medalist(s)	7	3	2	5	0
2015	Czech Republic	WJC18	6th	4	2	3	5	2
2015	Czech Republic	WJC	6th	4	0	1	1	0
2016	Czech Republic	WJC	5th	5	0	1	1	2
2017	Czech Republic	WJC	6th	5	2	1	3	4
Junior totals				35	12	11	23	12
