= Michal Kovařčík =

Czech ice hockey player

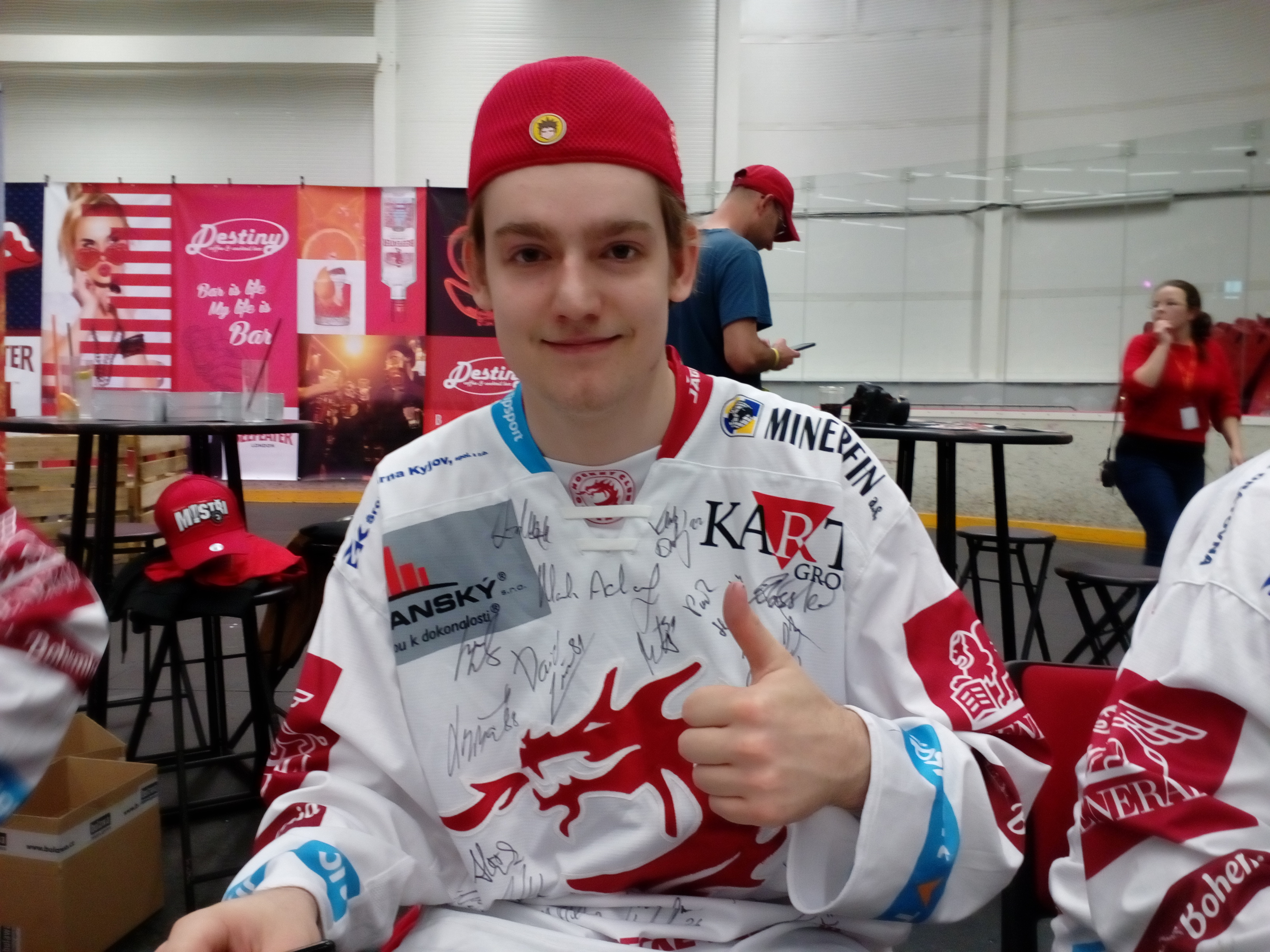
- Born: November 19, 1996 (age 29) Nový Jičín, Czech Republic
- Height: 5 ft 10 in (178 cm)
- Weight: 152 lb (69 kg; 10 st 12 lb)
- Position: Forward
- Shoots: Left
- ELH team Former teams: HC Oceláři Třinec; Mikkelin Jukurit; Oulun Kärpät
- National team: Czech Republic
- Playing career: 2015–present

Michal Kovařčík (born November 19, 1996) is a Czech professional ice hockey player who is a forward for HC Oceláři Třinec of the Czech Extraliga (ELH).

Kovařčík made his Czech Extraliga (ELH) debut playing with HC Oceláři Třinec during the 2015–16 season.

His elder brother Ondřej is also a professional hockey player – only 18 months apart in age, their early careers followed almost the same trajectory; their success as a partnership led to their being nicknamed after the Sedin twins (Daniel and Henrik Sedin). Former NHL winger Tomáš Fleischmann is their stepbrother.
