= Ondřej Kovařčík =

Czech ice hockey player

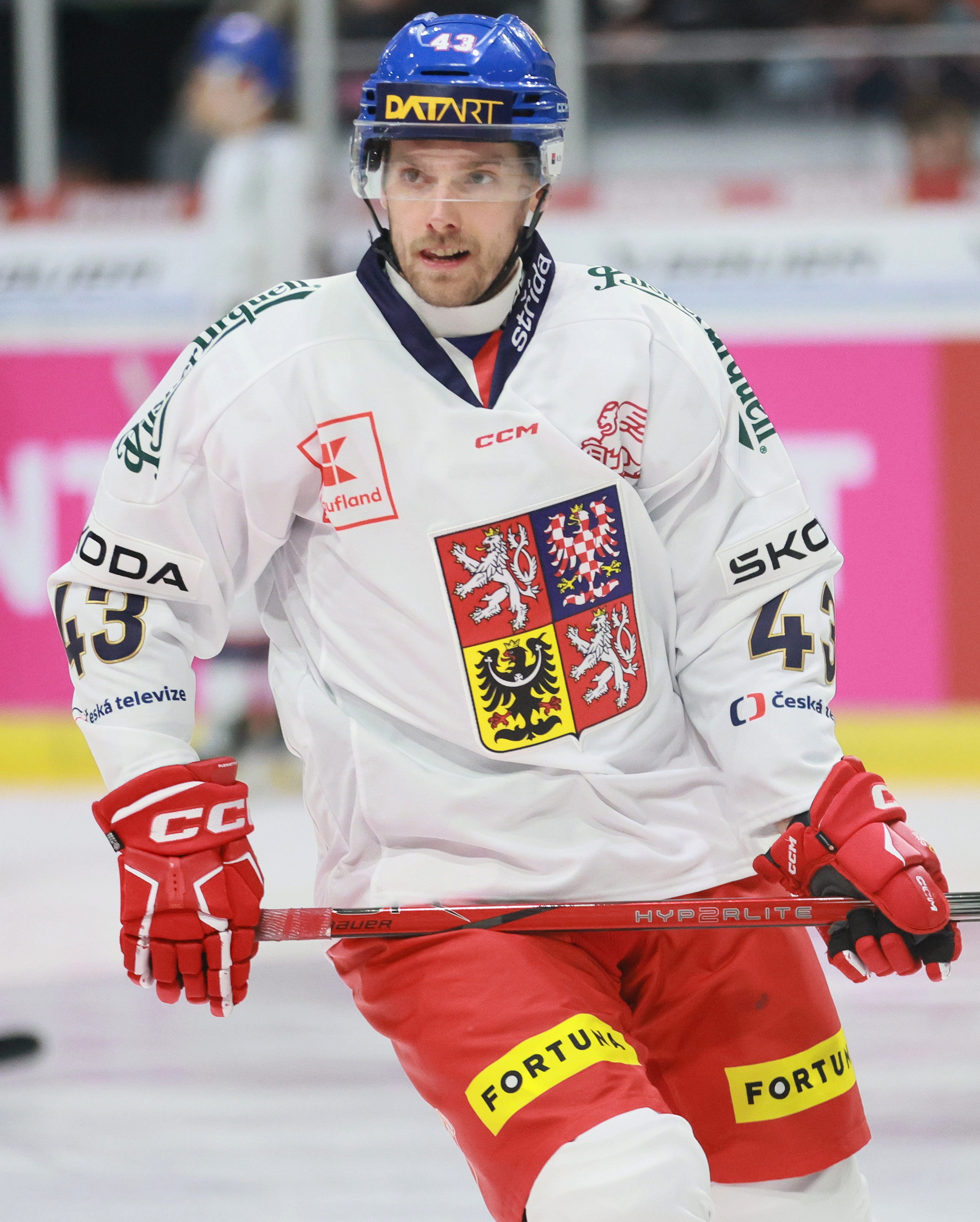
- Kovařčík in 2025
- Born: June 10, 1995 (age 30) Nový Jičín, Czech Republic
- Height: 5 ft 10 in (178 cm)
- Weight: 165 lb (75 kg; 11 st 11 lb)
- Position: Forward
- Shoots: Left
- ELH team Former teams: HC Oceláři Třinec; Mikkelin Jukurit; Motor České Budějovice
- Playing career: 2013–present

Ondřej Kovařčík (born June 10, 1995) is a Czech professional ice hockey player for HC Oceláři Třinec of the Czech Extraliga (ELH).

== Playing career ==
Kovařčík made his Czech Extraliga debut playing with HC Oceláři Třinec during the 2014–15 season. After six seasons in the ELH, Kovařčík moved Mikkelin Jukurit of the Finnish Liiga.

He later returned to the Czech Extraliga initially with Motor České Budějovice before returning to original club, HC Oceláři Třinec, in 2024.

His younger brother Michal is also a professional hockey player – only 18 months apart in age, their early careers followed almost the same trajectory; their success as a partnership led to their being nicknamed after the Sedin twins (Daniel and Henrik Sedin). Former NHL winger Tomáš Fleischmann is their stepbrother.
