= Ivan Hlinka Stadion =

Indoor sporting arena in Litvínov, Czech Republic

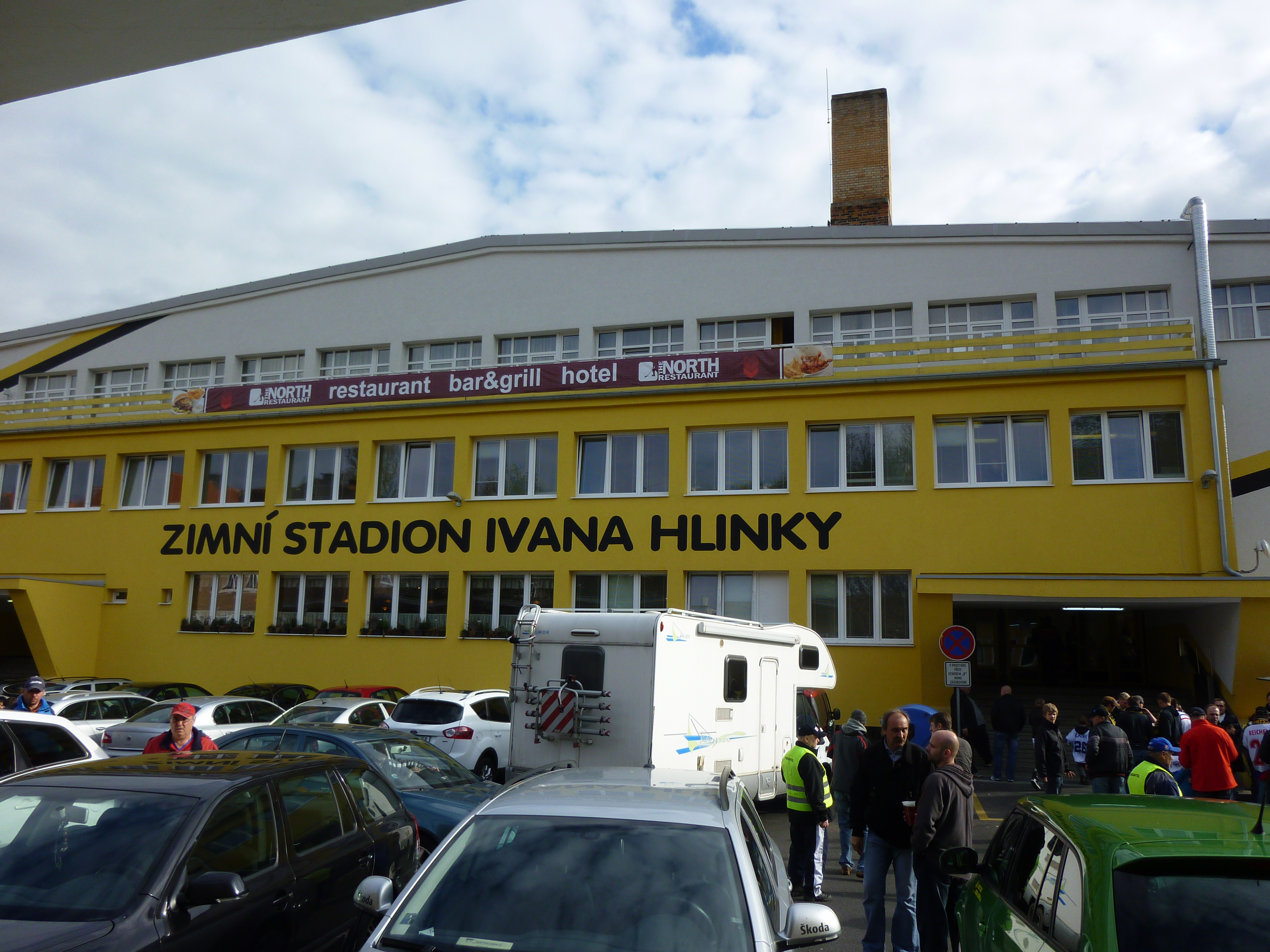
- Interactive map of Ivan Hlinka Stadion
- Former names: Zimní stadion Litvínov (1955 – 2004)
- Location: S. K. Neumanna 1598, Litvínov, Czech Republic 436 01
- Coordinates: 50.6056416667°N 13.621375°E
- Owner: Litvínov
- Capacity: 5,944 (3,900 for seating, 2,044 for standing)

Construction
- Built: 1955
- Opened: 1955
- Renovated: 1965

Tenant
- HC Litvínov

Zimní stadion Ivana Hlinky is an indoor sporting arena located in Litvínov, Czech Republic, named after Czech ice hockey player and coach Ivan Hlinka in 2004. The capacity of the arena is 5,944 people and was built in 1955. It is currently home to the HC Litvínov ice hockey team.
