= HC Dynamo Pardubice =

Ice hockey team

- Nickname: Tesla, Perníkáři
- City: Pardubice, Czech Republic
- League: Czech Extraliga
- Founded: 1923
- Home arena: Enteria arena (capacity: 10.194)
- Colours: Red, white
- Owner: (Czech Republic) Petr Dedek
- General manager: (Czech Republic) Dušan Salfický
- Head coach: (Czech Republic) Filip Pešán
- Captain: (Czech Republic) Lukáš Sedlák
- Website: hcdynamo.cz

HC Dynamo Pardubice is a professional ice hockey club that plays in the Czech Extraliga. Its home venue is Enteria arena located in Pardubice. The club was originally named LTC Pardubice, acquiring its current name at the start of the 2015–16 season.

== History ==
Ice hockey has been played in Pardubice since the beginning of the 20th century. Hockey's beginnings in Pardubice can be traced to the Matiční jezero where bandy, a hockey-like game, was played. This style of hockey was adopted from football – there were 11 players, opposing goals, a ball, and a football-like field. The first match of ice hockey was played in 1913 on the very same lake. Players such as Vilém Weiss, Potůček, Reiberg, Přibík, Komeštík and Kubeška played in this match.

Organised hockey was founded in Pardubice by Vilém Weiss in 1923, the same year that the club LTC Pardubice was established. Regular competitions first took place during the 1930-1931 season.

After the end of the Second World War, a new ice rink was installed in Pardubice, and by Christmas of 1947 a new winter sports stadium was opened with an artificial ice rink. In the 1949-1950 season Pardubice won its division and was promoted to the Extra League. The 1950-1951 season saw the team compete with a new name, Slavia Pardubice. Since that time the club has never been relegated from the top level of competition.

At the end of the 1952-1953 the club changed its name once again to Dynamo Pardubice. Players such as Bronislav Danda and goaltender Vladimír Nadrchal began their careers with Pardubice during the 1950s.

The club's first major success came in 1960. Dynamo Pardubice reached the medals for the first time, reaching 3rd place. In the same season a new winter sports stadium, including a roof, was completed. The following season the club changed its name again to Tesla Pardubice. This name remained until July 1991.

In the 1960s, Jiří Dolana and Stanislav Prýl went on to represent Czechoslovakia in Olympic competition. In 1965, Zdeněk Špaček led the league in scoring with 33 goals. This era was also marked by the arrival of junior players, who helped the club to a championship in 1967. The offensive trio consisting of Bohuslav Šťastný, Jiří Novák and Vladimír Martinec rose to stardom in the Extra League.

Pardubice reached further success in 1973, winning their first title in the champions league. Vladimír Martinec led the league with 23 assists, winning his first Golden Hockey Stick. The 1975-1976 season started with the final match between Tesla Pardubice and CSKA Moscow. The match, played in Czechoslovakia, was an unbelievable performance by the home team, defeating a professional army team by a score of 3-2. However, the following match played in Moscow was won by CSKA, 6-1.

Pardubice stayed among the top three teams in the Extra League for the following 3 seasons. Goaltender Jiří Crha was a backup goaltender in several top competitions at the time, but didn’t win any gold medals. Crha consequently decided to emigrate, becoming the first Czech player to play in the NHL. While team success diminished in the coming years, there were some highlights from individual players. The offensive trio of Vladimír Martinec, Jiří Novák and Bohuslav Šťastný won another world championship title. Vladimír Martinec led the Extra League with 28 assists in 1976, 42 goals in 1979, and won the Golden Hockey Stick three times.

After 1982, Pardubice's senior team experienced a resurgence. New team members included goaltender Dominik Hašek, defender František Musil, and forwards Otakar Janecký and Jiří Šejba. Musil and Šejba won the world championship in Prague in 1985, while playing for the army team Dukla Jihlava. After that František Musil went to the NHL, and Jiří Šejba returned to Tesla Pardubice, where he helped the team win championships in 1986-1987 and 1988-1989. Dominik Hašek won the Golden Hockey Stick both these seasons, as well as in 1990. Otakar Janecký led the league with 41 assists in 1988-1989, while Vladimír Martinec won honors for best coach. Ladislav Lubina won the award for the league's best offensive player in 1991.

Previous logo

== Modern history ==
At the beginning of the 1991–92 season the club changed its name to HC Pardubice. HC Pardubice entered the 1993-1994 season with a strong mixture of experienced and young players, including goaltender Radovan Biegl, who quickly became one of the best in the league. The team also boasted offensive star Richard Král who led the league with 43 goals. Also impressing was 18-year-old Milan Hejduk who was named top rookie in the Czech League. Pardubice's second-place finish helped coach Marek Sýkora earn coach of the year honors.

The solid finish was not to be repeated, as the team slipped to the bottom of the standings and had to defend its place in the Extra League in 1996. HC Pardubice gradually lost Král, Biegl and other experienced players who were replaced by junior players, among them forward Petr Sýkora. Hejduk won the gold medal at Nagano in 1998, leaving afterwards for the NHL.

In the following season the team received a new young coach, Miloš Říha, and Pardubice started to improve their performance. In the 1996-1997 season Pardubice reached 4th place. Though team success was elusive, various individual players had significant achievements, such as Petr Sýkora who led the league with 26 goals in 2001. In 2001 the winter sports stadium, re-named Duhová Aréna, underwent significant construction improvements. In the following two seasons, Pardubice's juniors managed to win two championship titles. Pardubice's senior team, though, couldn’t get past the first round of the playoffs. However, in 2004, Pardubice nearly won the title.

Nine years later the team reached the final again, this time against HC Slavia Praha. Slavia defeated Pardubice to claim its first Extra League Title. As a result, Pardubice had to wait for its fourth championship title until 2005, when they won thanks to the leadership of captain Jiří Dopita, and the performance of Slovak goaltender Ján Lašák. Pardubice's season was also aided by the cancelled 2004-2005 season in the NHL, which allowed Jan Bulis, Michal Mikeska and Milan Hejduk to come to Pardubice. Aleš Hemský was named the most valuable player in the play-offs. This was Pardubice's first title in 16 years.

During the club's history, many of its players have been honored in the Hall of Fame in Pardubice. Most notable are Josef Paleček, Vladimír Martinec, Bohuslav Šťastný, Otakar Janecký, Jiří Šejba, František Musil, Michal Sýkora, Ladislav Lubina, Aleš Hemský, Milan Hejduk and Dominik Hašek.

== Honours ==
=== Domestic ===
Czech Extraliga

- (gold) Winners (4): 2004–05, 2009–10, 2011–12, 2025–26
- (silver) Runners-up (5): 1993–94, 2002–03, 2006–07, 2023–24, 2024–25
- (bronze) 3rd place (2): 2010–11, 2022–23

Czechoslovak Extraliga

- (gold) Winners (3): 1972–73, 1986–87, 1988–89
- (silver) Runners-up (2): 1974–75, 1975–76
- (bronze) 3rd place (5): 1959–60, 1973–74, 1982–83, 1983–84, 1985–86

=== International ===
IIHF European Cup

- (silver) Runners-up (2): 1973–74, 1987–88

=== Current roster ===
As of 12 August 2026.

No.	Nat	Player	Pos	S/G	Age	Acquired	Birthplace
41	(Slovakia)	Peter Čerešňák (A)	D	R	33	2022	Trenčín, Slovakia
19	(Czech Republic)	Roman Červenka (A)	C	L	40	2024	Prague, Czechoslovakia
7	(Czech Republic)	Tomáš Dvořák	D	R	23	2022	Havlíčkův Brod, Czech Republic
18	(United States)	Hunter Fejes	LW	L	32	2026	Anchorage, United States
43	(Czech Republic)	Daniel Gazda	D	R	29	2025	Zlín, Czech Republic
61	(Czech Republic)	Martin Kaut	RW	R	26	2023	Brno, Czech Republic
29	(Slovakia)	Miloš Kelemen	RW	L	27	2024	Lučenec, Slovakia
11	(Czech Republic)	Jáchym Kondelík	C	L	26	2024	Hannover, Germany
33	(Czech Republic)	Jan Košťálek	D	R	31	2021	Prague, Czech Republic
94	(Czech Republic)	Jakub Lauko	C	L	26	2025	Prague, Czech Republic
15	(Czech Republic)	John Ludvig	D	L	26	2025	Liberec, Czech Republic
89	(Czech Republic)	Jan Mandát (A)	C	L	30	2022	Jihlava, Czech Republic
4	(Czech Republic)	Ondřej Mikliš	D	L	30	2025	Šumperk, Czech Republic
92	(Czech Republic)	Tomáš Nosek (A)	LW	L	34	2026	Pardubice, Czech Republic
44	(Czech Republic)	Patrik Poulíček	C	L	33	2013	Havlíčkův Brod, Czech Republic
23	(Czech Republic)	Lukáš Sedlák (C)	C	L	33	2022	České Budějovice, Czech Republic
96	(Czech Republic)	Jiří Smejkal	LW	L	29	2024	České Budějovice, Czech Republic
71	(Czech Republic)	Vladimír Sobotka	C	L	39	2025	Třebíč, Czechoslovakia
93	(Czech Republic)	Matěj Stránský	RW	R	33	2026	Ostrava, Czech Republic
32	(Canada)	Malcolm Subban	G	L	32	2025	Toronto, Canada
98	(Czech Republic)	David Tomášek	RW	R	30	2026	Prague, Czech Republic
79	(Canada)	Miguël Tourigny	D	R	24	2025	Victoriaville, Canada
55	(Czech Republic)	Tomáš Vondráček	LW	L	35	2022	Třebíč, Czechoslovakia
35	(Czech Republic)	Roman Will	G	L	34	2022	Plzeň, Czechoslovakia

== History of the team name ==
- 1923 – LTC Pardubice
- 1949 – Sokol Pardubice (consolidation of LTC and Rapid)
- 1950 – Slavia Pardubice
- 1953 – Dynamo Pardubice
- 1960 – Tesla Pardubice
- 1991 – HC (Hockey club) Pardubice
- 1995 – HC IB (Investiční banka) Pardubice
- 1997 – HC IPB (Investiční a poštovní banka) Pardubice
- 2002 – HC ČSOB (Československá obchodní banka) Pojišťovna Pardubice
- 2003 – HC Moeller Pardubice
- 2009 – HC Eaton Pardubice
- 2011 – HC ČSOB (Československá obchodní banka) Pojišťovna Pardubice
- 2015 – HC Dynamo Pardubice

=== Retired numbers ===
- 3 – Martin Čech
- 5 – Jiří Dolana
- 6 – Stanislav Prýl
- 10 – Jiří Šejba
- 10 - Josef Paleček
- 13 – Vladimír Martinec
- 16 – Karel Mach
- 17 – Bohuslav Šťastný
- 20 – Vladimír Dvořáček
- 20 – Jiří Novák
- 21 – Milan Koďousek
- 91 – Otakar Janecký
- 37 – Petr Sýkora
- 9 - Dominik Hašek
