= Czech Extraliga =

Highest-level ice hockey league in the Czech Republic

Tipsport Extraliga
- Current season, competition or edition: 2025–26 Czech Extraliga season
- Formerly: Czechoslovak First Ice Hockey League
- Sport: Ice hockey
- Founded: 1993
- No. of teams: 14
- Country: Czech Republic
- Most recent champion: HC Dynamo Pardubice (4th title)
- Most titles: HC Kometa Brno (14 titles–overall); VHK Vsetín, HC Oceláři Třinec (6 titles–ELH)
- Broadcasters: Česká televize, O2 TV, Fanseat, HockeyTV
- Level on pyramid: 1
- Relegation to: Czech 1.liga
- International cup: Champions Hockey League
- Related competitions: Czech 1.liga Czech 2.liga
- Website: hokej.cz/tipsport-extraliga

The Czech Extraliga (Czech: Extraliga ledního hokeje, ELH) is the highest-level ice hockey league in the Czech Republic. It was created in 1993 following the peaceful dissolution of Czechoslovakia midway through the 1992–93 Czechoslovak Extraliga season (which all Slovak and Czech teams played to completion). The league's season usually takes place between September and April and features 14 teams.

Teams from the ELH participate in the IIHF's annual European tournament in the CHL. During the 2022–23 CHL season, the ELH was ranked the No. 5 league in Europe, allowing them to send their top three teams to compete in the CHL.

== Naming and sponsorship ==
The name of the league is leased to a general sponsor and changes frequently.

- 1999–2000 – Staropramen Extraliga
- 2001–2002 – Český Telecom Extraliga
- 2003–2006 – Tipsport Extraliga
- 2007–2010 – O2 Extraliga
- 2010–current – Tipsport Extraliga

== League format ==
14 teams compete in the league, with the top 12 teams at the end of the season qualifying for post-season play to determine the national champion. The top 4 teams qualify directly to the best-of-seven quarterfinals, while the teams that finish fifth through 12th play a play-in series (best-of-five) to determine who will join them. The 14th team after the regular season plays the play-out group play with the winner of the First League in a qualifying group (best-of-seven), with the winner qualifying for the Extraliga the following season while second team play in the First League.

During the 2011–12 season, the association of Czech Extraliga managers attempted to close the league to prevent any relegations to or promoting from the second tier national league and also set a maximum salary cap similar to the NHL system. However, after some legal difficulties and strong opposition by the public, the whole proposition was scrapped and a system that allows promotions and relegations between divisions de iure continues.

== History ==
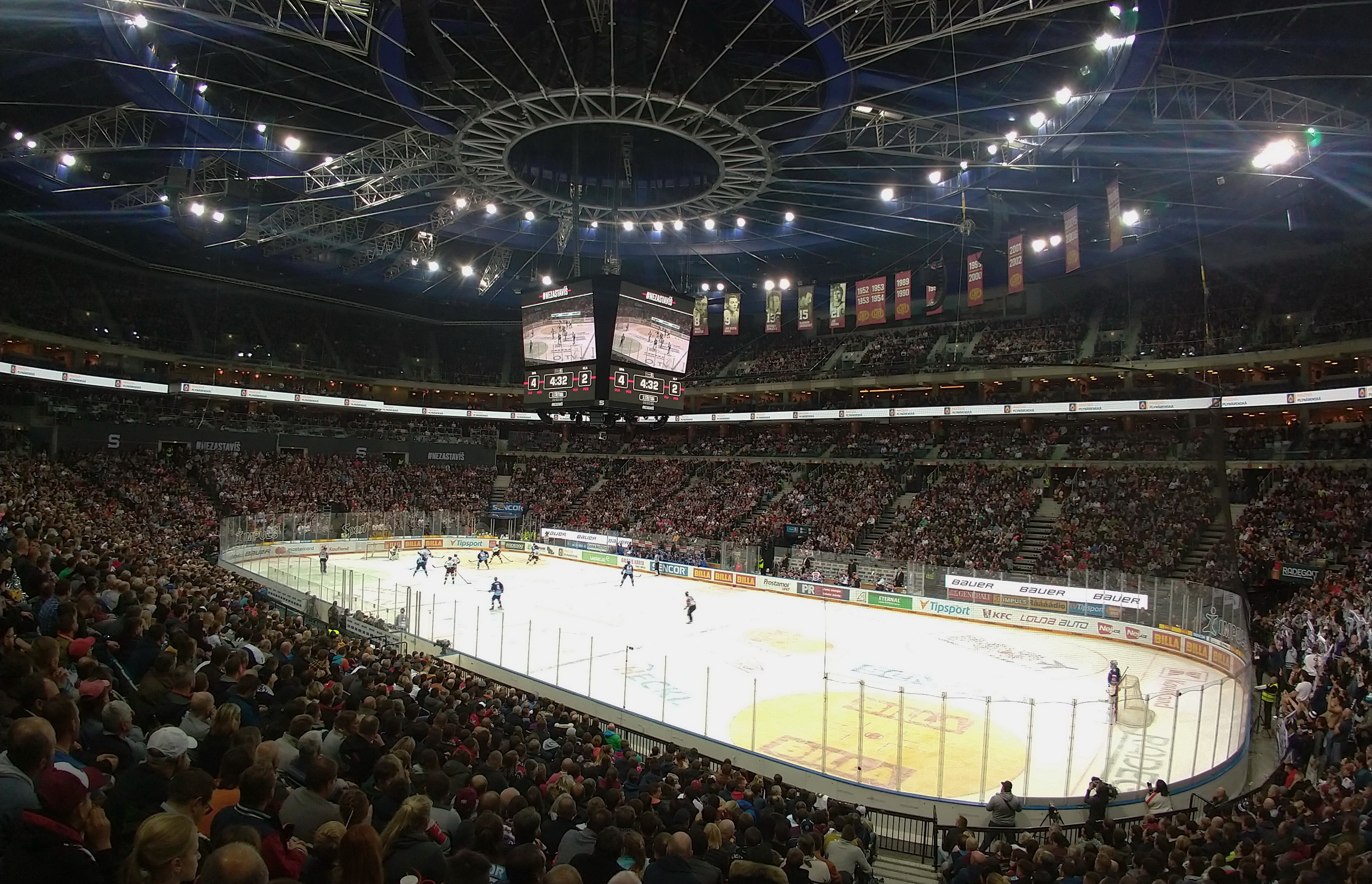
A Czech Extraliga game in O2 Arena

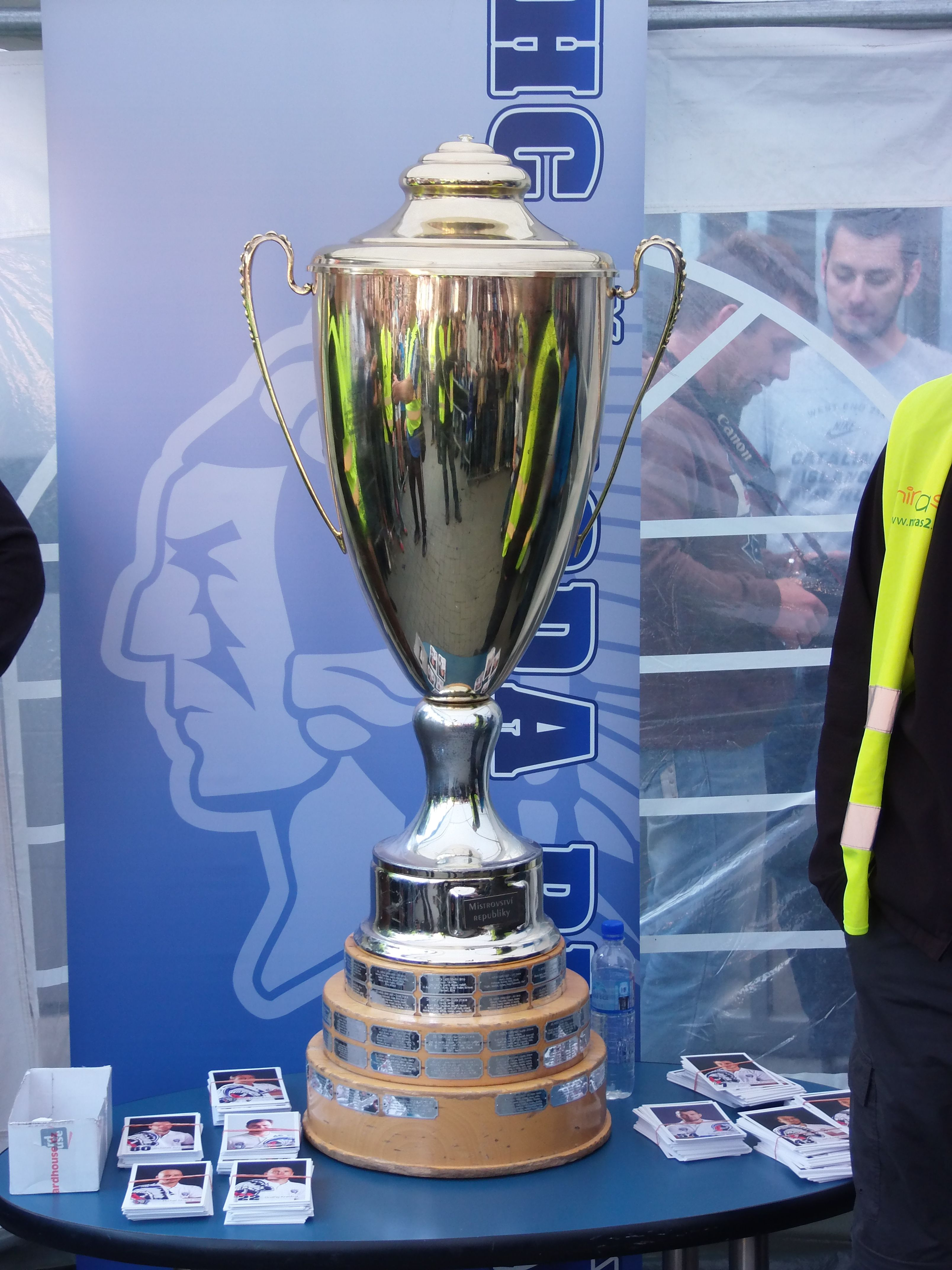
T. G. Masaryk Cup for the winner of the Czech Extraliga

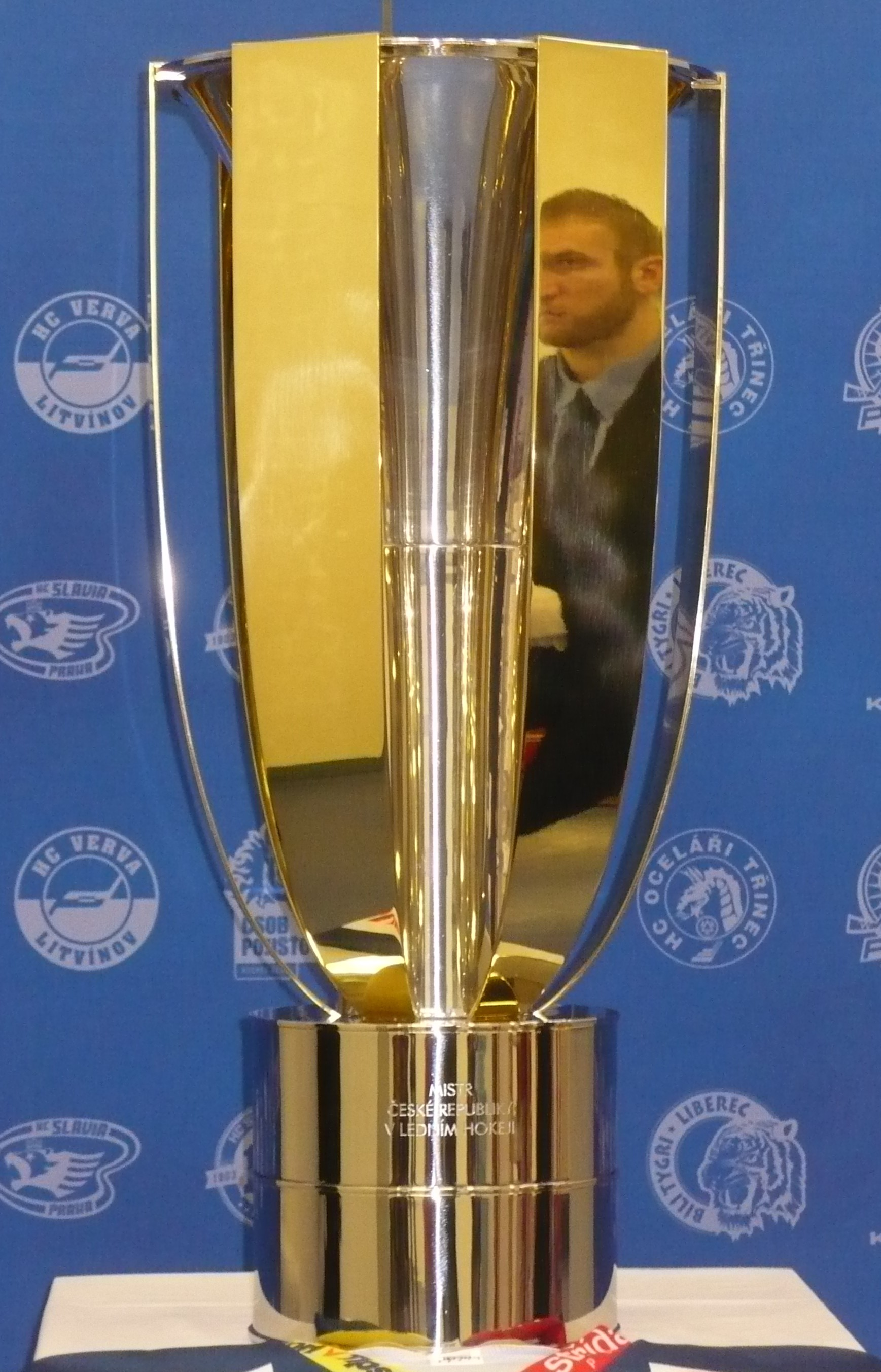
New T. G. Masaryk Cup

The league was founded in 1993, after the separation of Czechoslovakia put an end to the Czechoslovak First Ice Hockey League. The first season was won by HC Olomouc, who won the title after defeating HC Pardubice 3 games to 1. HC Slavia Praha and HC Dadák Vsetín were promoted from the First League after beating HC Stadion Hradec Králové and HC Vajgar Jindřichův Hradec in the qualifying series. The 1993–94 season was the only season Vajgar ever participated in the Extraliga, while Hradec Králové would return to the league some twenty years later as Mountfield HK.

The 1994–95 season marked the beginning of the Vsetín dynasty. In its first year in the league, HC Dadák Vsetín finished first in the regular season and later won the playoffs, beating AC ZPS Zlín 3 to 1. Vsetín would go on to win the next four installments of the Extraliga, with the team usually finishing first in the regular season as well. No team ever even came close to matching the feat of dominance that was shown by Vsetín throughout the second half of the 1990s.

In the 1995–96 season, the league expanded from 12 to 14 teams. This was the final expansion made to the league and 14 teams have been playing in the league ever since.

The 1998–99 season would be the last for one of the league's most traditional participants, HC Dukla Jihlava. The team lost the qualification series against HC Znojemsti Orli. Dukla later appeared in the 2004–05 installment of the Czech Extraliga, putting up a non-impressive 6-0-5-40 record and were relegated that same season.

In the 1999–2000 season, HC Sparta Praha broke Vsetín's five year long winning streak, defeating them in the finals. This was the only time Vsetín was defeated in the finals, as they would get their revenge and beat Sparta in the finals a season later. The 2000–01 season was the last time Vsetín managed to advance to the finals, and the team began falling further down in the standings every season since.

Sparta won their second title in the 2001–02 season. The title would stay in Prague the next season as well, however, this time Sparta's main rival, Slavia, won the title. The title would then be won by Hamé Zlín (2003–04 season) and HC Moeller Pardubice (2004–05 season) before one of the Prague teams captured it again.

For the first and only time, Sparta and Slavia would appear in the finals in the 2005–06 season. Sparta was the more successful team out of the pair, triumphing over Slavia 4 games to 2. Sparta would win the cup in the next season as well, this time defeating the 2004-05 champion Pardubice in 6 games.

Vsetín's run in the Extraliga would come to an end after the 2006–07 season. The Czech Ice Hockey Association would revoke the club's Extraliga license due to the team's enormous debt, forcing them to fold. As a result, no other teams were relegated that season and the First League champions, HC Slovan Ústečtí Lvi, were automatically promoted to the Extraliga. The 2007–08 season was the only season Slovan ever appeared in the Extraliga, as they were relegated back to the First League at the end of the season.

Since the 2006–07 season, 3 points have been awarded for a regulation win and 2 points for an overtime/shootout victory, while the defeated team in overtime/shootout gets 1 point. If necessary, penalty shots are used to decide games after overtime. Also from the 2006–07 season through the 2007–08 season there was only one assist credited for each goal instead of the standard two that other leagues credit. This rule change affected league statistics in a negative manner, and so the rule was changed back to the standard two assists starting in the 2008–09 season.

Slavia Prague would defeat HC Energie Karlovy Vary in the finals in the 2007–08 season. The same teams appeared in the finals a year later, this time with the opposite outcome. Pardubice then captured its second and third title in the 2009–10 and 2011–12 seasons, respectively. HC Oceláři Třinec won their first title in the 2010–11 season.

The first open-air hockey game since the 1960s took place during the 2010–11 season in Pardubice. The attendance for this game was record breaking, with 17,140 people in the crowd. The home team squared off against HC Kometa Brno, for whom this was their first season back in the Extraliga since 1995. Pardubice won this game 4–2.

HC Mountfield České Budějovice was forced to sell its license after the 2012–13 season, due to an interesting dispute. At the end of the season, Extraliga announced that Radegast would be the new beer sponsor for the league. However, Mountfield had a naming rights agreement with Budweiser Budvar Brewery at the time, and would therefore be unable to sell any other kind of beer at their stadium. As a result of Extraliga and the club not being able to reach an agreement, the team sold its license to Hradec Králové, thus forming Mountfield HK.

For the 2019–20 season, Piráti Chomutov descended to the lower league, while Rytíři Kladno returns to the league after five years. This is mainly thanks to the engagement of Jaromír Jágr, who became recently both owner and a player in the club.

== Current teams ==
Teams competing in Czech Extraliga in the 2023–24 season.

Team	City	Arena	Capacity
Kometa Brno	Brno	Winning Group Arena	7,700
HC Olomouc	Olomouc	Zimní stadion Olomouc	5,500
Mountfield HK	Hradec Králové	ČPP Arena	7,700
Energie Karlovy Vary	Karlovy Vary	KV Arena	7,500
BK Mladá Boleslav	Mladá Boleslav	Ško-Energo Aréna	4,200
Bílí Tygři Liberec	Liberec	Home Credit Arena	7,250
Verva Litvínov	Litvínov	Ivan Hlinka Stadion	6,011
Dynamo Pardubice	Pardubice	Enteria arena	10,194
Škoda Plzeň	Plzeň	Logspeed CZ Arena	8,236
HC Motor České Budějovice	České Budějovice	Budvar Arena	6,421
Sparta Praha	Prague	O2 Arena	17,383
Oceláři Třinec	Třinec	Werk Arena	5,400
Vítkovice Ridera	Ostrava	Ostravar Aréna	10,004
Rytíři Kladno	Kladno	ČEZ Stadion	5,200

== Past champions ==
=== by Year ===
Year	Winner	2nd place	3rd place
1994	HC Olomouc	HC Pardubice	Poldi SONP Kladno
1995	HC Dadák Vsetín	AC ZPS Zlín	HC České Budějovice
1996	HC Petra Vsetín	HC Chemopetrol Litvínov	HC Sparta Praha
1997	HC Petra Vsetín	HC Vítkovice Steel	HC Sparta Praha
1998	HC Slovnaft Vsetín	HC Železárny Třinec	HC Vítkovice Steel
1999	HC Slovnaft Vsetín	HC ZPS Barum Zlín	HC Železárny Třinec
2000	HC Sparta Praha	HC Slovnaft Vsetín	HC Keramika Plzen
2001	VHK Vsetín	HC Sparta Praha	HC Vítkovice Steel
2002	HC Sparta Praha	HC Vítkovice Steel	HC Hamé Zlín
2003	HC Slavia Praha	HC Pardubice	HC Sparta Praha
2004	HC Hamé Zlín	HC Slavia Praha	HC Sparta Praha
2005	HC Moeller Pardubice	HC Hamé Zlín	HC Bílí Tygři Liberec
2006	HC Sparta Praha	HC Slavia Praha	HC Znojmo
2007	HC Sparta Praha	HC Moeller Pardubice	HC Liberec
2008	HC Slavia Praha	Energie Karlovy Vary	HC Mountfield České Budějovice
2009	Energie Karlovy Vary	HC Slavia Praha	HC Sparta Praha
2010	HC Eaton Pardubice	HC Vítkovice Steel	HC Slavia Praha
2011	HC Oceláři Třinec	HC Vítkovice Steel	HC Eaton Pardubice
2012	HC ČSOB Pojišťovna Pardubice	HC Kometa Brno	HC Škoda Plzeň
2013	HC Škoda Plzeň	PSG Zlín	HC Slavia Praha
2014	PSG Zlín	HC Kometa Brno	HC Sparta Praha
2015	HC Verva Litvínov	HC Oceláři Třinec	HC Kometa Brno
2016	HC Bílí Tygři Liberec	HC Sparta Praha	HC Škoda Plzeň
2017	HC Kometa Brno	HC Bílí Tygři Liberec	Mountfield HK
2018	HC Kometa Brno	HC Oceláři Třinec	HC Škoda Plzeň
2019	HC Oceláři Třinec	HC Bílí Tygři Liberec	HC Škoda Plzeň
2020	Playoff canceled due to the COVID-19 pandemic.		
2021	HC Oceláři Třinec	HC Bílí Tygři Liberec	HC Sparta Praha
2022	HC Oceláři Třinec	HC Sparta Praha	České Budějovice
2023	HC Oceláři Třinec	Mountfield HK	HC Dynamo Pardubice
2024	HC Oceláři Třinec	HC Dynamo Pardubice	HC Sparta Praha
2025	HC Kometa Brno	HC Dynamo Pardubice	HC Sparta Praha
2026	HC Dynamo Pardubice	HC Oceláři Třinec	HC Energie Karlovy Vary

=== by club ===
Club	Winners	Runners-up	Third place	Winning years
HC Oceláři Třinec	6	4	1	2011, 2019, 2021, 2022, 2023, 2024
VHK Vsetín	6	1	0	1995, 1996, 1997, 1998, 1999, 2001
HC Sparta Praha	4	3	7	2000, 2002, 2006, 2007
HC Pardubice	4	3	1	2005, 2010, 2012, 2026
HC Kometa Brno	3	2	1	2017, 2018, 2025
HC Zlín	2	4	1	2004, 2014
HC Slavia Praha	2	3	2	2003, 2008
HC Liberec	1	3	2	2016
Energie Karlovy Vary	1	1	1	2009
HC Verva Litvínov	1	1	0	2015
HC Olomouc	1	0	0	1994
HC Škoda Plzeň	1	0	5	2013
HC Vítkovice Steel	0	4	2	–
Mountfield HK	0	1	1	–
HC České Budějovice	0	0	3	–
HC Kladno	0	0	1	–
HC Znojmo	0	0	1	–

== See also ==
- Czech 1.liga
- Czech 2.liga
- Czech Ice Hockey Association
