= 2011 World Junior Ice Hockey Championships =

U20 ice hockey tournament in Buffalo, New York

2011 IIHF World U20 Championship

Tournament details
- Host country: United States
- Cities: Buffalo, Lewiston
- Dates: December 26, 2010 – January 5, 2011
- Teams: 10

Final positions
- Champions: Russia (4th title)
- Runners-up: Canada
- Third place: United States
- Fourth place: Sweden

Tournament statistics
- Games played: 31
- Goals scored: 201 (6.48 per game)
- Attendance: 329,687 (10,635 per game)
- Scoring leader: (Canada) Brayden Schenn (18 points)

Awards
- MVP: (Canada) Brayden Schenn

The 2011 IIHF World U20 Championship, commonly referred to as the 2011 World Junior Hockey Championships (2011 WJHC), was the 35th edition of the Ice Hockey World Junior Championship and was hosted by the United States. The games were played in Western New York, at HSBC Arena in Buffalo and Niagara University's Dwyer Arena in Lewiston. Russia won their 4th gold medal and 13th overall with a 5–3 victory over Canada in the championship game, after completing the biggest comeback in the WJHC history; being down 3–0 after two periods, the Russians scored five goals in the third period to capture their first WJHC gold medal since 2003. The host team, the United States, won the bronze medal with a 4–2 win over Sweden.

== Bid process ==
Co-host of the 2005 tournament, Grand Forks, North Dakota, also submitted a bid to host the 2011 tournament. In addition, Detroit was mentioned as a possible host city.

== Venues ==
HSBC Arena Capacity: 18,690	Dwyer Arena Capacity: 2,100
United States – Buffalo	United States – Lewiston

== Summary ==
=== Exhibition games ===
A series of five exhibition games were held between several of the teams at Sports Centre at MCC in Brighton, New York and the Jamestown Savings Bank Ice Arena in Jamestown, New York in conjunction with, and immediately prior to, the tournament.

=== Preliminary round ===
The Preliminary Round robin consisted of two pools of five teams each, played in a round robin format. The United States (Pool A) and Sweden (Pool B) went undefeated to finish first in their respective pools and earn an automatic berth in the semifinals. To qualify for the quarterfinals, Canada and Russia finished second and third in Pool B while Finland and Switzerland did likewise in Pool A. The remaining teams, Slovakia, Germany, Czech Republic and Norway, were sent to the relegation round.

=== Relegation round ===
In the relegation round, Slovakia and Norway played in the first game, with Slovakia winning 5–0. The Czech Republic defeated Germany 3–2 in the second game. After the first day of action, the final results were decided and the remaining games were meaningless. Germany lost to Norway 3–1 and the Czech Republic defeated Slovakia 5–2 in the final relegation games. Norway and Germany were relegated to Division I for the 2012 tournament.

=== Medal round ===
==== Quarterfinals ====
The first quarterfinal game saw Russia take on Finland. Russia trailed by two goals late in the game, but scored twice to tie and send it to overtime. Evgeny Kuznetsov scored the game-winning goal in overtime. In the other quarterfinal, Canada easily defeated Switzerland 4–1.

==== Semifinals ====
The first semi-final featured Russia and Sweden. Controversy erupted in the second period as an apparent icing call on Russia was waved off by the on-ice officials, allowing the Russians to score and take a 2–0 lead. The Swedish team protested the non-call, but the goal stood. The Swedes did forge a comeback and took a 3–2 lead in the third period, but the Russians scored late to force overtime for the second consecutive game. The game went to a shootout with Russia winning, 4–3. The second semifinal was a highly anticipated rematch of the previous year's gold medal game between Canada and the United States, the defending champions. In front of a mainly Canadian crowd that made the trip to Buffalo, Canada earned a berth in the final with a 4–1 victory over their American rivals.

==== Fifth place game ====
The fifth place game featured the losing teams of the quarter-final games. Switzerland defeated Finland 3–2 in a shootout to take fifth place.

==== Bronze medal game ====
The United States defeated Sweden 4–2 to win the bronze medal, its first ever WJHC medal on home ice.

==== Gold medal game ====
The gold medal game was between Canada and Russia. The game marked Canada's tenth consecutive appearance in the final. The Russians had lost their three previous gold medal games to Canada. Canada led 3–0 after two periods. However, the Russians scored five unanswered goals in the third period, including two in a span of 13 seconds, to win the game 5–3 and capture the gold medal. It was Russia's first gold medal since 2003 and Canada's second straight silver medal finish. Brayden Schenn of Canada was named the tournament's Most Valuable Player.

The game delivered one of the largest television audiences in Canadian history, with an average of 6.88 million viewers watching on TSN and another 652,000 watching the French-language broadcast on RDS. An estimated half of Canadians watched a portion or all of the game.

== Top division ==
=== Preliminary round ===
==== Group A ====
Pos	Team	Pld	W	OTW	OTL	L	GF	GA	GD	Pts	Qualification
1	United States	4	3	1	0	0	15	4	+11	11	Semifinals
2	Finland	4	3	0	1	0	17	4	+13	10	Quarterfinals
3	Switzerland	4	2	0	0	2	11	13	−2	6	Quarterfinals
4	Slovakia	4	0	1	0	3	7	19	−12	2	Relegation round
5	Germany	4	0	0	1	3	5	15	−10	1	Relegation round

Source: IIHF

All times are local (Eastern Time Zone – UTC−5).

December 26, 2010; 12:30	Germany	3–4 (0–4, 1–0, 2–0)	Switzerland	HSBC Arena; Attendance: 13,629

Game reference

Philipp Grubauer
Niklas Treutle
Goalies
Benjamin Conz
Referees:
(Finland) Antti Boman
(United States) Keith Kaval

	0–1	04:31 – I. Pestoni (G. Hofmann)
	0–2	09:21 – N. Niederreiter (PP)
	0–3	09:48 – R. Loeffel (N. Niederreiter) (PP)
	0–4	13:25 – L. Camperchioli (I. Pestoni, G. Hofmann) (PP)
M. Noebels (M. Plachta, D. Bittner) (PP) – 24:22	1–4
M. Plachta (B. Hüfner, M. Höfflin) (PP) – 50:10	2–4
C. Mapes (N. Hauner, D. Orendorz) – 53:19	3–4

34 min
Penalties
14 min
35
Shots
21

December 26, 2010; 20:00	Finland	2–3 OT (0–1, 1–1, 1–0) (OT: 0–1)	United States	HSBC Arena; Attendance: 14,093

Game reference

Joni Ortio
Goalies
Jack Campbell
Referees:
(Germany) Stephan Bauer
(Germany) Georgij Jablukow

	0–1	18:54 – J. Faulk (J. Merrill, C. Kreider) (PP)
J. Nättinen (T. Rajala) – 33:50	1–1
	1–2	35:08 – J. Zucker
I. Pakarinen (E. Haula, T. Pulkkinen) – 52:59	2–2
	2–3	63:08 – N. Bjugstad (OT)

8 min
Penalties
2 min
34
Shots
30

December 27, 2010; 19:00	Slovakia	2–1 OT (0–0, 1–1, 0–0) (OT: 1–0)	Germany	HSBC Arena; Attendance: 12,942

Game reference

Dominik Riečický
Goalies
Philipp Grubauer
Referees:
(Sweden) Pehr Claesson
(Russia) Rafail Kadyrov

R. Pánik (A. Jánošík, M. Preisinger) – 20:08	1–0
	1–1	36:46 – N. Hauner (C. Mapes)
M. Hrivík (R. Pánik, A. Kudrna) (PP) – 63:39 (OT)	2–1

14 min
Penalties
12 min
39
Shots
48

December 28, 2010; 12:30	Switzerland	0–4 (0–1, 0–1, 0–2)	Finland	HSBC Arena; Attendance: 13,518

Game reference

Benjamin Conz
Goalies
Joni Ortio
Referees:
(Russia) Rafail Kadyrov
(Sweden) Patrik Sjöberg

0–1	19:41 – J. Nättinen (T. Rajala, J. Jokipakka)
0–2	24:37 – J. Turtiainen (J. Jokipakka, J. Donskoi)
0–3	44:37 – T. Pulkkinen (E. Haula) (PP)
0–4	47:51 – J. Junttila (H. Tuominen, J. Donskoi)

4 min
Penalties
10 min
15
Shots
38

December 28, 2010; 20:00	United States	6–1 (2–0, 4–1, 0–0)	Slovakia	HSBC Arena; Attendance: 12,750

Game reference

Jack Campbell
Goalies
Dominik Riečický
Juraj Hollý
Referees:
(Czech Republic) Martin Frano
(Finland) Jari Levonen

K. Palmieri (C. Coyle, C. Kreider) – 04:31	1–0
K. Palmieri (J. Merrill, C. Coyle) (PP) – 08:02	2–0
C. Coyle (J. Faulk, K. Palmieri) (PP) – 23:56	3–0
C. Brown (B. Dumoulin, N. Leddy) (PP) – 31:47	4–0
	4–1	32:26 – T. Jurčo (J. Majdan)
D. Shore – 33:32	5–1
E. Etem (N. Bjugstad, R. Bourque) – 36:57	6–1

4 min
Penalties
58 min
57
Shots
18

December 29, 2010; 15:30	Finland	5–1 (1–0, 3–0, 1–1)	Germany	HSBC Arena; Attendance: 14,362

Game reference

Joni Ortio
Goalies
Philipp Grubauer
Niklas Treutle
Referees:
(Canada) Matt Kirk
(Canada) Pat Smith

J. Armia (T. Kivistö, T. Rajala) – 15:59	1–0
M. Salomäki (J. Donskoi, J. Junttila) – 26:23	2–0
J. Donskoi (J. Junttila) – 33:47	3–0
J. Virtanen (T. Pulkkinen) – 35:19	4–0
	4–1	43:28 – T. Rieder (M. Noebels)
E. Haula (T. Pulkkinen, S. Vatanen) – 56:07	5–1

18 min
Penalties
16 min
44
Shots
29

December 30, 2010; 15:00	Switzerland	6–4 (3–1, 1–1, 2–2)	Slovakia	HSBC Arena; Attendance: 12,731

Game reference

Benjamin Conz
Goalies
Dominik Riečický
Juraj Hollý
Referees:
(Canada) Matt Kirk
(Sweden) Patrik Sjoberg

G. Hofmann (N.Steiner, J. Vermin) – 8:15	1–0
	1–1	9:18 – P. Šišovský (M. Vandas)
D. Schlumpf (D. Trutmann) – 11:50	2–1
S. Bärtschi (D. Trutmann, I. Pestoni) (PP) – 18:52	3–1
	3–2	21:29 – M. Hrivík (M. Vandas, A. Šťastný)
N. Niederreiter – 30:15	4–2
	4–3	45:30 A. Šťastný (M. Vandas)
	4–4	52:08 R. Pánik (H. Jaborník, A. Jánošík)
S. Walser (Y. Herren, R. Engler) – 54:06	5–4
I. Pestoni (ENG) – 59:29	6–4

14 min
Penalties
12 min
37
Shots
33

December 30, 2010; 19:00	Germany	0–4 (0–2, 0–2, 0–0)	United States	HSBC Arena; Attendance: 15,276

Game reference

Niklas Treutle
Goalies
Jack Campbell
Andy Iles
Referees:
(Finland) Antti Boman
(Slovakia) Daniel Konc

0–1	12:37 – C. Coyle (J. Merrill) (PP)
0–2	13:25 – J. D'Amigo
0–3	27:54 – J. Merrill (N. Bjugstad, R. Bourque)
0–4	33:10 – C. Kreider (K. Palmieri, C. Coyle) (PP)

12 min
Penalties
6 min
14
Shots
48

December 31, 2010; 12:30	Slovakia	0–6 (0–3, 0–3, 0–0)	Finland	HSBC Arena; Attendance: 13,371

Game reference

Juraj Hollý
Dominik Riečický
Goalies
Joni Ortio
Sami Aittokallio
Referees:
(Germany) Georgij Jablukov
(United States) Keith Kaval

0–1	01:40 – M. Salomäki (J. Junttila)
0–2	06:32 – J. Jokipakka (T. Rajala, J. Virtanen) (PP)
0–3	10:36 – E. Haula (S. Vatanen, T. Pulkkinen) (PP)
0–4	26:45 – J. Donskoi (T. Pulkkinen, J. Armia) (PP)
0–5	28:40 – E. Haula (SH)
0–6	37:39 – V. Virkkunen (T. Tallberg, J. Turtiainen)

8 min
Penalties
12 min
17
Shots
43

December 31, 2010; 20:00	United States	2–1 (1–1, 1–0, 0–0)	Switzerland	HSBC Arena; Attendance: 13,417

Game reference

Jack Campbell
Goalies
Benjamin Conz
Referees:
(Sweden) Pehr Claesson
(Canada) Pat Smith

	0–1	07:01 – I. Pestoni (G. Hofmann, D. Trutmann)
C. Kreider (C. Coyle, J. Faulk) – 10:15	1–1
M. Callahan (J. D'Amigo, B. Nelson) – 33:53	2–1

2 min
Penalties
16 min
42
Shots
26

==== Group B ====
Pos	Team	Pld	W	OTW	OTL	L	GF	GA	GD	Pts	Qualification
1	Sweden	4	3	1	0	0	21	9	+12	11	Semifinals
2	Canada	4	3	0	1	0	28	12	+16	10	Quarterfinals
3	Russia	4	2	0	0	2	19	13	+6	6	Quarterfinals
4	Czech Republic	4	1	0	0	3	10	21	−11	3	Relegation round
5	Norway	4	0	0	0	4	4	27	−23	0	Relegation round

Source: IIHF

All times are local (Eastern Time Zone – UTC−5).

December 26, 2010; 16:00	Russia	3–6 (1–1, 2–2, 0–3)	Canada	HSBC Arena; Attendance: 18,690

Game reference

Igor Bobkov
Goalies
Olivier Roy
Referees:
(Slovakia) Daniel Konc
(Finland) Jari Levonen

Y. Urychev (D. Orlov, V. Tarasenko) – 03:57	1–0
	1–1	17:55 – M. Foligno (L. Leblanc, C. de Haan) (PP)
	1–2	30:35 – R. Ellis
N. Dvurechensky (A. Voronin, D. Orlov) – 31:51	2–2
	2–3	35:15 – E. Gudbranson (Q. Howden, S. Couturier)
D. Sobchenko (V. Tarasenko, Y. Urychev) (PP) – 36:52	3–3
	3–4	43:46 – R. Johansen (J. Schwartz) (PP)
	3–5	46:14 – B. Schenn (Z. Kassian, J. Schwartz) (PP)
	3–6	59:33 – C. Hamilton (B. Schenn)

10 min
Penalties
6 min
27
Shots
42

December 26, 2010; 16:00	Norway	1–7 (0–2, 0–2, 1–3)	Sweden	Dwyer Arena; Attendance: 1,320

Game reference

Lars Volden
Goalies
Fredrik Petterson-Wentzel
Referees:
(Czech Republic) Martin Fraňo
(Canada) Matt Kirk

	0–1	00:57 – J. Klingberg (S. Wännström, K. Dahlbeck)
	0–2	05:29 – O. Lindberg (S. Wännström)
	0–3	24:09 – P. Cehlin (A. Lander)
	0–4	39:43 – P. Cehlin (G. Landeskog, A. Lander)
	0–5	40:49 – J. Klingberg (J. Fasth, O. Lindberg)
	0–6	42:01 – G. Landeskog (P. Cehlin, A. Lander)
E. Børresen (S. Brekke, T. Skaarberg) – 52:04	1–6
	1–7	57:16 – C. Klingberg (J. Larsson, F. Styrman)

4 min
Penalties
6 min
11
Shots
46

December 27, 2010; 19:00	Czech Republic	2–0 (0–0, 1–0, 1–0)	Norway	Dwyer Arena; Attendance: 1,381

Game reference
Marek Mazanec	Goalies	Steffen Søberg	Referees: (Slovakia) Daniel Konc (Canada) Pat Smith
T. Rachůnek (A. Honejsek) – 33:55 / 1–0; A. Honejsek (SH) – 44:57 / 2–0			Referees: (Slovakia) Daniel Konc (Canada) Pat Smith
18 min	Penalties	10 min	Referees: (Slovakia) Daniel Konc (Canada) Pat Smith
38	Shots	21	Referees: (Slovakia) Daniel Konc (Canada) Pat Smith

December 28, 2010; 16:00	Canada	7–2 (2–1, 3–0, 2–1)	Czech Republic	HSBC Arena; Attendance: 17,919

Game reference

Olivier Roy
Goalies
Filip Novotný
Referees:
(Finland) Antti Boman
(Germany) Georgij Jablukow

	0–1	00:49 – A. Honejsek
B. Schenn (R. Johansen, R. Ellis) (PP) – 14:43	1–1
J. Schwartz (B. Schenn, R. Ellis) (PP) – 16:40	2–1
L. Leblanc (B. Schenn) (SH) – 29:20	3–1
R. Ellis (B. Schenn, C. Ashton) – 33:09	4–1
C. Eakin (C. Cizikas, E. Gudbranson) – 39:43	5–1
T. Barrie (B. Schenn, R. Ellis) (PP2) – 49:36	6–1
J. Cowen (T. Barrie, L. Leblanc) (PP2) – 49:59	7–1
	7–2	55:26 – J. Jeřábek (M. Pláňek) (PP)

33 min
Penalties
35 min
39
Shots
19

December 28, 2010; 19:00	Sweden	2–0 (2–0, 0–0, 0–0)	Russia	Dwyer Arena; Attendance: 1,400

Game reference
Robin Lehner	Goalies	Dmitri Shikin	Referees: (United States) Keith Kaval (Slovakia) Daniel Konc
A. Lander (F. Styrman, P. Cehlin) – 10:49 / 1–0; J. Fasth (C. Järnkrok) – 14:11 / 2–0			Referees: (United States) Keith Kaval (Slovakia) Daniel Konc
22 min	Penalties	8 min	Referees: (United States) Keith Kaval (Slovakia) Daniel Konc
38	Shots	30	Referees: (United States) Keith Kaval (Slovakia) Daniel Konc

December 29, 2010; 19:30	Norway	1–10 (1–6, 0–1, 0–3)	Canada	HSBC Arena; Attendance: 17,061

Game reference

Steffen Søberg
Lars Volden
Goalies
Mark Visentin
Referees:
(Germany) Stephan Bauer
(Sweden) Pehr Claesson

	0–1	02:01 – C. Cizikas (B. Connolly)
	0–2	04:50 – B. Schenn (R. Johansen, D. Olsen)
	0–3	10:45 – E. Gudbranson (B. Schenn, R. Ellis)
	0–4	13:27 – L. Leblanc (M. Foligno)
R. Juell – 13:35	1–4
	1–5	14:34 – B. Schenn (Q. Howden, E. Gudbranson)
	1–6	18:00 – M. Foligno (L. Leblanc)
	1–7	20:44 – B.Schenn (Q. Howden, R. Ellis)
	1–8	56:35 – B. Schenn (T. Barrie)
	1–9	57:18 – S. Couturier (B. Connolly, S. Després)
	1–10	59:31 – E. Gubranson (R. Johansen, R. Ellis)

6 min
Penalties
2 min
32
Shots
41

December 30, 2010; 15:00	Sweden	6–3 (3–1, 2–2, 1–0)	Czech Republic	Dwyer Arena; Attendance: 1,388

Game reference

Fredrik Petterson-Wentzel
Goalies
Marek Mazanec
Filip Novotný
Referees:
(Germany) Stephan Bauer
(Finland) Jari Levonen

	0–1	3:09 – M. Hlinka (J. Orsava, P. Holík) (PP)
J. Larsson (J. Sundström, C. Järnkrok (PP) – 5:53	1–1
M. Friberg (R. Rakell, A. Lander) (PP) – 15:59	2–1
J. Fasth (A. Larsson) – 17:09	3–1
S. Wännström (K. Dahlbeck, O. Lindberg) – 24:59	4–1
J. Fasth (C. Järnkrok, J. Larsson) (PP) – 25:42	5–1
	5–2	28:07 – M. Frk (J. Culek, J. Jeřábek)
	5–3	34:51 – M. Frk (J. Jeřábek, P. Straka) (PP)
C. Järnkrok (J. Thörnberg) – 45:48	6–3

14 min
Penalties
16 min
45
Shots
21

December 30, 2010; 19:00	Russia	8–2 (2–2, 1–0, 5–0)	Norway	Dwyer Arena; Attendance: 1,382

Game reference

Dmitri Shikin
Goalies
Lars Volden
Referees:
(Czech Republic) Martin Fraňo
(Germany) Georgij Jablukov

N. Dvurechenski (A. Voronin, N. Pivtsakin) – 6:58	1–0
	1–1	11:59 – N. Weberg
D. Sobchenko (D. Orlov, Y. Urychev – 12:54	2–1
	2–2	15:59 – J. Oppøyen (M. Olsen, R. Andersen) (PP)
V. Tarasenko (G. Berdyukov, S. Valuiski) (PP) – 24:03	3–2
D. Sobchenko (V. Tarasenko, D. Orlov) – 40:18	4–2
M. Kitsyn (E. Kuznetsov, D. Orlov) – 48:29	5–2
A. Sergeyev (M. Berezin) – 51:57	6–2
E. Kuznetsov (N. Dvurechensky, M. Ignatovich) – 55:18	7–2
A. Voronin (N. Dvurechensky, G. Berdyukov) – 55:37	8–2

12 min
Penalties
22 min
55
Shots
24

December 31, 2010; 16:00	Canada	5–6 GWS (3–2, 1–2, 1–1) (OT: 0–0) (SO: 0–1)	Sweden	HSBC Arena; Attendance: 17,761

Game reference

Olivier Roy
Goalies
Robin Lehner
Referees:
(Czech Republic) Martin Frano
(Russia) Rafail Kadyrov

S. Couturier – 00:58	1–0
	1–1	02:14 – M. Friberg (R. Rakell) (PP)
	1–2	14:55 – C. Klingberg (S. Wännström)
Q. Howden (R. Johansen, C. de Haan) – 15:38	2–2
C. Hamilton (R. Johansen) – 19:59	3–2
	3–3	20:52 – C. Klingberg
	3–4	22:44 – J. Thörnberg (P. Nemeth)
C. Hamilton (B. Schenn, S. Després) (SH) – 24:37	4–4
B. Schenn (R. Johansen, C. de Haan) (PP) – 43:22	5–4
	5–5	51:43 – P. Cehlin (T. Erixon, F. Styrman)

R. Ellis (miss)
B. Schenn (miss)
Shootout
O. Lindberg
(miss) C. Järnkrok
A. Lander
8 min
Penalties
6 min
34
Shots
42

December 31, 2010; 19:00	Czech Republic	3–8 (1–4, 1–4, 1–0)	Russia	Dwyer Arena; Attendance: 1,400

Game reference

Marek Mazanec
Filip Novotný
Goalies
Dmitri Shikin
Referees:
(Finland) Jari Levonen
(Sweden) Patrik Sjöberg

J. Orsava (M. Hlinka, P. Holík) – 01:53	1–0
	1–1	02:57 – D. Orlov (V. Tarasenko, D. Sobchenko)
	1–2	06:23 – E. Kuznetsov (A. Burdasov, N. Dvurechensky)
	1–3	08:30 – D. Golubev (V. Tarasenko, A. Panarin)
	1–4	10:48 – V. Tarasenko (D. Orlov, D. Sobchenko)
P. Straka (A. Nestrasil, J. Jeřábek) (PP) – 22:33	2–4
	2–5	24:28 – G. Berdyukov (M. Kitsyn) (PP)
	2–6	26:28 – D. Sobchenko (V. Tarasenko, D. Orlov) (PP)
	2–7	30:22 – S. Bocharov (A. Panarin)
	2–8	31:00 – M. Kitsyn (E. Kuznetsov)
M. Hlinka (M. Frk) (PP2) – 51:01	3–8

18 min
Penalties
36 min
34
Shots
29

=== Relegation round ===
The results from matches between teams from the same group in the preliminary round were carried forward to this round.

Pos	Team	Pld	W	OTW	OTL	L	GF	GA	GD	Pts	Relegation
1	Czech Republic	3	3	0	0	0	10	4	+6	9	
2	Slovakia	3	1	1	0	1	9	6	+3	5	
3	Norway	3	1	0	0	2	3	8	−5	3	Relegated to the 2012 Division I A
4	Germany	3	0	0	1	2	4	8	−4	1	Relegated to the 2012 Division I A

Source: IIHF

All times are local (Eastern Time Zone – UTC−5).

January 2, 2011; 15:30	Slovakia	5–0 (2–0, 0–0, 3–0)	Norway	Dwyer Arena; Attendance: 1,189

Game reference

Juraj Hollý
Goalies
Lars Volden
Referees:
(Germany) Stephan Bauer
(Sweden) Pehr Claesson

R. Pánik (M. Preisinger, A. Jánošík) (PP) – 12:25	1–0
R. Pánik (D. Bortňák, A. Jánošík) (PP2) – 13:03	2–0
J. Majdan (R. Pánik, D. Bortňák) – 51:01	3–0
R. Pánik – 53:29	4–0
R. Pánik (ENG) – 55:05	5–0

8 min
Penalties
18 min
31
Shots
37

January 2, 2011; 19:30	Czech Republic	3–2 (0–0, 1–1, 2–1)	Germany	Dwyer Arena; Attendance: 1,171

Game reference

Filip Novotný
Goalies
Philipp Grubauer
Referees:
(Russia) Rafail Kadyrov
(Slovakia) Daniel Konc

	0–1	22:54 – N. Hauner (T. Brandl, M.Ohmann)
M. Hlinka (J. Jeřábek, M. Frk) (PP) – 28:04	1–1
	1–2	46:21 – M. Möchel (B. Keil)
O. Palát (R. Horák, J. Jeřábek) – 50:44	2–2
O. Palát (P. Straka) – 59:00	3–2

4 min
Penalties
6 min
40
Shots
31

January 4, 2011; 15:30	Germany	1–3 (0–1, 1–0, 0–2)	Norway	Dwyer Arena; Attendance: 1,108

Game reference

Niklas Treutle
Goalies
Steffen Kent Soberg
Referees:
(Russia) Rafail Kadyrov
(Slovakia) Daniel Konc

	0–1	01:14 – N. Weberg
T. Kühnhackl (T. Rieder, B. Hüfner) – 22:15	1–1
	1–2	48:31 – H.K. Hollstedt
	1–3	59:51 – P. Roste Fossen (J. Oppoyen (EN)

30 min
Penalties
12 min
30
Shots
14

January 4, 2011; 19:30	Czech Republic	5–2 (2–0, 3–2, 0–0)	Slovakia	Dwyer Arena; Attendance: 1,080

Game reference

Filip Novotný
Goalies
Juraj Hollý
Dominik Riečický
Referees:
(Finland) Antti Boman
(Sweden) Pehr Claesson

P. Holík (O. Palát, J. Jeřábek) (PP) – 16:22	1–0
J. Culek (D. Tuma) (PP) – 19:13	2–0
T. Rachůnek (M. Frk, A. Honejsek) – 20:24	3–0
A. Nestrasil (J. Orsava) – 20:54	4–0
	4–1	23:41 – R. Pánik (D. Riečický) (PP)
M. Frk (J. Jeřábek, A. Nestrasil) (PP2) – 34:43	5–1
	5–2	38:05 – R. Pánik (A. Jánošík) (PP)

8 min
Penalties
18 min
45
Shots
21

=== Final round ===
Quarter-Finals
A2	Finland	3
B3	Russia (OT)	4
B2	Canada	4
A3	Switzerland	1

Semi-Finals
B1	Sweden	3
B3	Russia (GWS)	4
A1	United States	1
B2	Canada	4

Gold Medal Game
B3	Russia	5
B2	Canada	3
Bronze Medal Game
B1	Sweden	2
A1	United States	4

==== Quarterfinals ====
January 2, 2011; 15:30	Canada	4–1 (1–1, 1–0, 2–0)	Switzerland	HSBC Arena; Attendance: 14,890

Game reference

Mark Visentin
Goalies
Benjamin Conz
Referees:
(Finland) Antti Boman
(United States) Keith Kaval

	0–1	01:09 – I. Pestoni (S. Bärtschi)
R. Johansen (B. Schenn, R. Ellis) (PP) – 15:06	1–1
C. Cizikas (C. Ashton, S. Després) – 37:28	2–1
L. Leblanc (C. Eakin, B. Schenn) – 44:17	3–1
Z. Kassian (ENG) – 58:01	4–1

4 min
Penalties
32 min
50
Shots
22

January 2, 2011; 19:30	Finland	3–4 OT (1–1, 1–0, 1–2) (OT: 0–1)	Russia	HSBC Arena; Attendance: 13,471

Game reference

Joni Ortio
Goalies
Dmitri Shikin
Referees:
(Canada) Matt Kirk
(Canada) Pat Smith

	0–1	10:10 – U. Urychev (D. Sobchenko, V. Tarasenko)
T. Pulkkinen (I. Pakarinen) – 12:32	1–1
J. Junttila (M. Salomäki) – 37:26	2–1
J. Donskoi (T. Pulkkinen, S. Vatanen) (PP) – 42:24	3–1
	3–2	56:19 – E. Kuznetsov (M. Kitsyn) (PP)
	3–3	58:22 – M. Kitsyn (E. Kuznetsov, S. Kalinin)
	3–4	66:44 – E. Kuznetsov (M. Kitsyn)

10 min
Penalties
12 min
41
Shots
34

==== Semifinals ====
January 3, 2011; 15:30	Sweden	3–4 GWS (0–1, 1–1, 2–1) (OT: 0–0) (SO: 0–1)	Russia	HSBC Arena; Attendance: 13,435

Game reference

Robin Lehner
Goalies
Dmitri Shikin
Referees:
(Germany) Georgij Jablukov
(Canada) Pat Smith

	0–1	06:37 – V. Tarasenko (S. Valuiski)
	0–2	27:09 – D. Golubev (S. Bocharov, A. Panarin)
A. Larsson (R. Rakell, J. Thörnberg) (PP) – 37:59	1–2
C. Järnkrok (J. Fasth, A. Larsson) – 41:20	2–2
P. Cehlin (A. Larsson) (PP) – 56:41	3–2
	3–3	58:33 – S. Kalinin (M. Kitsyn, D. Orlov)

O. Lindberg (miss)
S. Wännström (miss)
A. Lander (miss)
Shootout
(miss) V. Tarasenko
D. Golubev
6 min
Penalties
8 min
49
Shots
32

January 3, 2011; 19:30	United States	1–4 (0–2, 0–1, 1–1)	Canada	HSBC Arena; Attendance: 18,690

Game reference

Jack Campbell
Goalies
Mark Visentin
Referees:
(Czech Republic) Martin Frano
(Finland) Jari Levonen

	0–1	02:38 – C. Hamilton (C. Eakin)
	0–2	13:54 – Q. Howden (B. Connolly, M. Visentin)
	0–3	25:59 – R. Johansen (PP)
	0–4	46:02 – Z. Kassian (C. De Haan)
C. Brown (J. Morin, N. Leddy) (PP) – 49:37	1–4

6 min
Penalties
8 min
23
Shots
41

==== 5th place playoff ====
January 4, 2011; 19:30	Finland	2–3 GWS (2–1, 0–1, 0–0) (OT: 0–0) (SO: 0–1)	Switzerland	HSBC Arena; Attendance: 14,052

Game reference

Joni Ortio
Goalies
Benjamin Conz
Referees:
(Sweden) Patrik Sjoberg
(Canada) Pat Smith

T. Pulkkinen (E. Haula, I. Pakarinen) – 00:22	1–0
	1–1	02:56 – I. Pestoni
E. Haula (T. Tallberg) (SH) – 18:03	2–1
	2–2	25:23 – L. Camperchioli (N. Niederreiter, D. Trutmann) (PP)
	2–3	65:00 – Y. Herren (GWG)

24 min
Penalties
14 min
23
Shots
31

==== Bronze medal game ====
January 5, 2011; 15:30	Sweden	2–4 (0–0, 1–1, 1–3)	United States	HSBC Arena; Attendance: 16,104

Game reference

Fredrik Petterson-Wentzel
Goalies
Jack Campbell
Referees:
(Germany) Georgij Jablukov
(Canada) Matt Kirk

O. Lindberg (C. Klingberg, S. Wännström) – 31:58	1–0
	1–1	33:32 – C. Kreider (C. Brown, J. Merrill) (PP)
	1–2	40:52 – D. Shore (J. Faulk, K. Palmieri)
	1–3	51:40 – N. Bjugstad (N. Leddy, R. Bourque)
J. Fasth (J. Larsson) – 54:18	2–3
	2–4	58:07 – C. Kreider (K. Palmieri, B. Dumoulin)

12 min
Penalties
8 min
36
Shots
44

==== Gold medal game ====
January 5, 2011; 19:30	Canada	3–5 (2–0, 1–0, 0–5)	Russia	HSBC Arena; Attendance: 18,690

Game reference

Mark Visentin
Goalies
Dmitry Shikin
Igor Bobkov
Referees:
(Czech Republic) Martin Frano
(United States) Keith Kaval
Linesmen:
(United States) Johnathan Morrison
(Germany) Felix Winnekens

R. Ellis (B. Schenn, C. de Haan) (PP) – 04:50	1–0
C. Ashton (L. Leblanc) – 19:46	2–0
B. Schenn (M. Foligno) – 26:27	3–0
	3–1	42:33 – A. Panarin (D. Golubev, M. Berezin)
	3–2	42:46 – M. Kitsyn (E. Kuznetsov, S. Kalinin)
	3–3	47:29 – V. Tarasenko (E. Kuznetsov)
	3–4	55:22 – A. Panarin (V. Tarasenko, D. Golubev)
	3–5	58:44 – N. Dvurechensky (E. Kuznetsov)

4 min
Penalties
8 min
38
Shots
27

=== Scoring leaders ===
Pos	Player	Country	GP	G	A	Pts	+/−	PIM
1	Brayden Schenn	Canada	7	8	10	18	+10	0
2	Evgeny Kuznetsov	Russia	7	4	7	11	+7	4
2	Vladimir Tarasenko	Russia	7	4	7	11	+8	0
4	Ryan Ellis	Canada	7	3	7	10	+2	2
5	Richard Pánik	Slovakia	6	8	2	10	+1	12
6	Maxim Kitsyn	Russia	7	5	4	9	+7	0
7	Teemu Pulkkinen	Finland	6	3	6	9	+2	6
8	Ryan Johansen	Canada	7	3	6	9	+4	2
9	Dmitri Orlov	Russia	7	1	8	9	+10	6
10	Jakub Jeřábek	Czech Republic	6	1	7	8	+1	4

GP = Games played; G = Goals; A = Assists; Pts = Points; +/− = Plus/minus; PIM = Penalties In Minutes Source:

=== Goaltending leaders ===
(minimum 40% team's total ice time)

Pos	Player	Country	TOI	GA	GAA	Sv%	SO
1	Jack Campbell	United States	353:35	10	1.70	94.08	0
2	Joni Ortio	Finland	354:52	11	1.86	93.12	1
3	Niklas Treutle	Germany	186:04	7	2.26	93.00	0
4	Mark Visentin	Canada	239:05	8	2.01	92.31	0
5	Dmitri Shikin	Russia	342:11	16	2.81	92.00	0

TOI = Time on ice (minutes:seconds); SA = Shots against; GA = Goals against; GAA = Goals against average; Sv% = Save percentage; SO = Shutouts

09:50, 6 January 2011 (UTC)

=== Tournament awards ===
Most Valuable Player

- (Canada) Brayden Schenn

All-star team

- Goaltender: (United States) Jack Campbell
- Defencemen: (Canada) Ryan Ellis, (Russia) Dmitri Orlov
- Forwards: (Canada) Brayden Schenn, (Canada) Ryan Johansen, (Russia) Evgeny Kuznetsov

source IIHF.com

IIHF best player awards

- Goaltender: (United States) Jack Campbell
- Defenceman: (Canada) Ryan Ellis
- Forward: (Canada) Brayden Schenn

=== Final standings ===
Rank	Team
1st place, gold medalist(s)	Russia
2nd place, silver medalist(s)	Canada
3rd place, bronze medalist(s)	United States
4th	Sweden
5th	Switzerland
6th	Finland
7th	Czech Republic
8th	Slovakia
9th	Norway
10th	Germany

Relegated to the 2012 Division I A

== Division I ==
=== Group A ===
The Division I Group A tournament was played in Babruysk, Belarus, from December 13 to December 19, 2010.

Pos	Team	Pld	W	OTW	OTL	L	GF	GA	GD	Pts	Promotion, qualification or relegation
1	Latvia	5	5	0	0	0	21	3	+18	15	Promoted to the 2012 Top Division
2	Belarus (H)	5	4	0	0	1	18	9	+9	12	Qualified for the 2012 Division I A
3	Great Britain	5	3	0	0	2	12	10	+2	9	Qualified for the 2012 Division I A
4	Italy	5	2	0	0	3	13	8	+5	6	Qualified for the 2012 Division I B
5	Japan	5	1	0	0	4	9	15	−6	3	Qualified for the 2012 Division I B
6	Ukraine	5	0	0	0	5	4	32	−28	0	Relegated to the 2012 Division II A

Source: IIHF
(H) Host

=== Group B ===
The Division I Group B tournament was played in Bled, Slovenia, from December 12 to December 18, 2010.

Pos	Team	Pld	W	OTW	OTL	L	GF	GA	GD	Pts	Promotion, qualification or relegation
1	Denmark	5	4	0	0	1	35	14	+21	12	Promoted to the 2012 Top Division
2	Slovenia (H)	5	4	0	0	1	31	14	+17	12	Qualified for the 2012 Division I A
3	Austria	5	3	1	0	1	24	13	+11	11	Qualified for the 2012 Division I A
4	Kazakhstan	5	2	0	0	3	19	24	−5	6	Qualified for the 2012 Division I B
5	Croatia	5	1	0	1	3	16	35	−19	4	Qualified for the 2012 Division I B
6	Lithuania	5	0	0	0	5	10	35	−25	0	Relegated to the 2012 Division II A

Source: IIHF
(H) Host

== Division II ==
=== Group A ===
The Division II Group A tournament was played in Tallinn, Estonia, from December 13 to December 19, 2010.

Pos	Team	Pld	W	OTW	OTL	L	GF	GA	GD	Pts	Promotion, qualification or relegation
1	France	5	5	0	0	0	49	5	+44	15	Promoted to the 2012 Division I B
2	Netherlands	5	3	0	1	1	19	16	+3	10	Qualified for the 2012 Division II A
3	Spain	5	3	0	0	2	12	16	−4	9	Qualified for the 2012 Division II A
4	Belgium	5	1	1	0	3	17	34	−17	5	Qualified for the 2012 Division II B
5	Estonia (H)	5	1	0	0	4	16	29	−13	3	Qualified for the 2012 Division II B
6	Iceland	5	1	0	0	4	10	23	−13	3	Relegated to the 2012 Division III

Source: IIHF
(H) Host

=== Group B ===
The Division II Group B tournament was played in Miercurea Ciuc, Romania, from December 13 to December 19, 2010.

Pos	Team	Pld	W	OTW	OTL	L	GF	GA	GD	Pts	Promotion, qualification or relegation
1	Poland	5	5	0	0	0	61	10	+51	15	Promoted to the 2012 Division I B
2	Hungary	5	4	0	0	1	50	16	+34	12	Qualified for the 2012 Division II A
3	South Korea	5	3	0	0	2	27	30	−3	9	Qualified for the 2012 Division II A
4	Romania (H)	5	2	0	0	3	16	24	−8	6	Qualified for the 2012 Division II B
5	Australia	5	1	0	0	4	21	39	−18	3	Qualified for the 2012 Division II B
6	China	5	0	0	0	5	10	66	−56	0	Relegated to the 2012 Division III

Source: IIHF
(H) Host

== Division III ==
The Division III tournament was played in Mexico City, Mexico, from January 9 to January 18, 2011.

Pos	Team	Pld	W	OTW	OTL	L	GF	GA	GD	Pts	Promotion
1	Mexico (H)	6	6	0	0	0	39	9	+30	18	Promoted to the 2012 Division II B
2	Serbia	6	5	0	0	1	56	8	+48	15	Promoted to the 2012 Division II B
3	North Korea	6	4	0	0	2	37	22	+15	12	
4	Turkey	6	3	0	0	3	36	33	+3	9	
5	New Zealand	6	2	0	0	4	17	43	−26	6	
6	Bulgaria	6	0	1	0	5	13	52	−39	2	
7	Chinese Taipei	6	0	0	1	5	16	47	−31	1	

Source: IIHF
(H) Host

Preceded by 2010 World Juniors	IIHF World U20 Championship; 2011	Succeeded by 2012 World Juniors
