= Igor Bobkov =

Russian ice hockey player (born 1991)

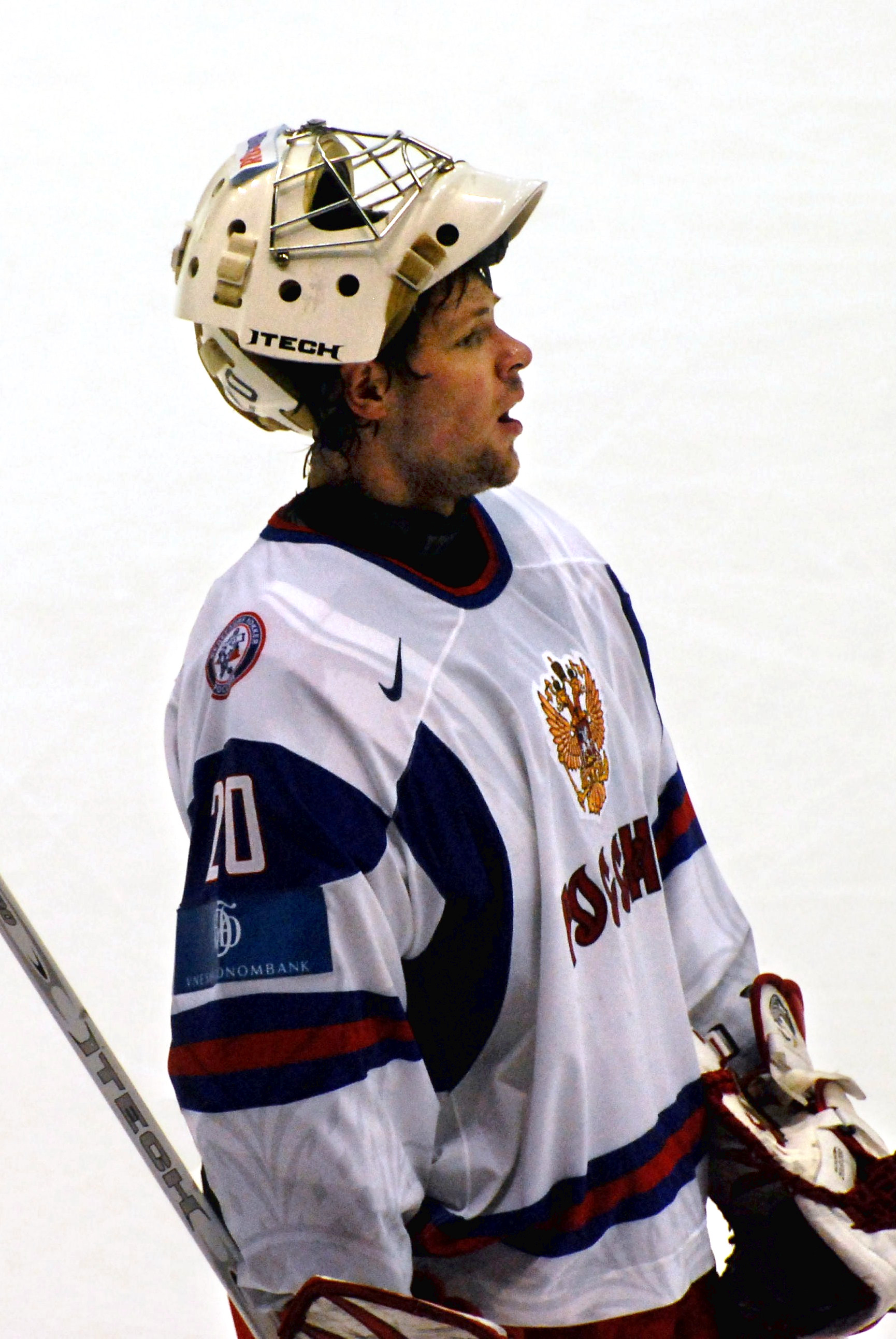
- Bobkov with Russia during the 2010 World Junior Ice Hockey Championships
- Born: January 2, 1991 (age 35) Surgut, Russian SFSR, Soviet Union
- Height: 6 ft 6 in (198 cm)
- Weight: 192 lb (87 kg; 13 st 10 lb)
- Position: Goaltender
- Catches: Left
- KHL team Former teams: Free agent Anaheim Ducks; Admiral Vladivostok; Avangard Omsk; Ak Bars Kazan; Avtomobilist Yekaterinburg; Amur Khabarovsk; Neftekhimik Nizhnekamsk
- NHL draft: 76th overall, 2009; Anaheim Ducks
- Playing career: 2008–present

Igor Bobkov (Russian: Игорь Бобков) (born January 2, 1991) is a Russian professional ice hockey goaltender who is currently a free agent. He last played for HC Neftekhimik Nizhnekamsk in the Kontinental Hockey League (KHL).

Before playing professional hockey, Bobkov spent time in the Ontario Hockey League with the London Knights and Kingston Frontenacs. Bobkov represents Russia internationally, and helped them win a gold medal at the 2011 World Junior Ice Hockey Championships.

== Playing career ==
Bobkov was selected by the Anaheim Ducks in the 3rd round (76th overall) of the 2009 NHL entry draft. After spending a year in Russia, including playing at the 2010 World Junior Ice Hockey Championships, Bobkov was selected 53rd overall in the 2010 CHL Import Draft by the London Knights of the Ontario Hockey League (OHL). He managed three wins in 21 games playing behind Michael Houser. He was signed by the Ducks to a three-year entry-level contract on October 7, 2010. During the 2011 OHL offseason, Bobkov was traded to the Kingston Frontenacs.

Bobkov made his professional debut with the Syracuse Crunch of the American Hockey League at the end of the 2010–11 season, after his season with the Knights was over. He joined the Crunch again after the Frontenacs' season was over the following season. Bobkov made the jump to professional hockey full-time with the Norfolk Admirals during the 2012–13 season. During the 2013–14 season, Bobkov split time between the Admirals in the AHL and the Utah Grizzlies of the ECHL.

On August 6, 2015, after not being tendered a contract offer to be retained by the Ducks, Bobkov's Kontinental Hockey League (KHL) rights were traded from Metallurg Magnitogorsk to Admiral Vladivostok. He was then signed as free agent to a two-year contract with the Russian club.

After three seasons with Admiral, Bobkov left Vladivostok as a free agent, securing a lucrative two-year contract with Avangard Omsk on May 16, 2018.

In the 2020–21 season, Bobkov backstopped in tandem with Šimon Hrubec, helping Avangard to their first KHL championship, posting an 18–7–2 regular season record and collecting 4 post-season wins to claim the Gagarin Cup.

As a free agent following the conclusion of his contract with Avangard, Bobkov signed a one-year contract with Ak Bars Kazan of the KHL on 14 May 2021. In the following 2021–22 season, Bobkov made just 16 appearances with Ak Bars, collecting 7 wins.

Bobkov left Ak Bars at the conclusion of his contract and moved to Avtomobilist Yekaterinburg of the KHL as a free agent, agreeing to a one-year contract on 6 May 2022. In the 2022–23 season, Bobkov made 34 appearances in posting a 14–13–1 record in the regular season.

As a free agent, Bobkov signed a one-year agreement with the KHL's Amur Khabarovsk on 11 May 2023.

During the 2024–25 season, with Khabarovsk out of playoff contention, Bobkov left to join Neftekhimik Nizhnekamsk and signed a one-year extension through 2026 on 26 December 2024.

However, after playing just three games with the club, his contract was terminated by mutual agreement in the offseason, making him a free agent.

== International play ==
Medal record

Representing Russia

Men's ice hockey

World Junior Championships
Gold medal – first place	2011 USA	

World U18 Championships
Silver medal – second place	2009 USA	

Bobkov was recognized as the "Best Goaltender" at the 2009 IIHF World U18 Championships, where he backstopped Team Russia to a win a silver medal. He represented Russia again at the 2010 and 2011 World Junior Championships, helping the team to a gold medal in 2011. During the 2011 tournament, Bobkov served as a backup to Dmitri Shikin for most of the tournament. In the gold medal game against Canada, Bobkov came in to relieve Shikin and stopped 20 shots. In addition to securing the gold medal, Bobkov was named Russia's top player in that game.

== Career statistics ==
			Regular season									Playoffs
Season	Team	League	GP	W	L	T/OT	MIN	GA	SO	GAA	SV%	GP	W	L	MIN	GA	SO	GAA	SV%
2008–09	Metallurg Magnitogorsk	Russia 3	9	—	—	—	-	24	-	-	—	—	—	—	—	—	—	—	—
2009–10	Stalnye Lisy	MHL	14	8	1	—	665	30	2	2.71	.893	2	0	0	59	3	0	3.50	.893
2010–11	London Knights	OHL	21	4	10	0	1048	72	0	4.12	.874	3	0	0	29	2	0	4.16	.882
2010–11	Syracuse Crunch	AHL	2	2	0	0	120	7	0	3.51	.917	—	—	—	—	—	—	—	—
2011–12	Kingston Frontenacs	OHL	58	17	32	6	3300	200	1	3.64	.902	—	—	—	—	—	—	—	—
2011–12	Syracuse Crunch	AHL	4	2	1	1	246	11	0	2.68	.913	—	—	—	—	—	—	—	—
2012–13	Norfolk Admirals	AHL	28	11	17	0	1570	82	2	3.13	.903	—	—	—	—	—	—	—	—
2013–14	Utah Grizzlies	ECHL	29	17	8	4	1768	60	2	2.04	.921	2	0	2	130	7	0	3.23	.881
2013–14	Norfolk Admirals	AHL	10	5	3	1	543	22	0	2.43	.919	—	—	—	—	—	—	—	—
2014–15	Norfolk Admirals	AHL	7	2	4	0	379	27	0	4.27	.852	—	—	—	—	—	—	—	—
2014–15	Utah Grizzlies	ECHL	34	19	12	2	1950	84	4	2.58	.918	10	4	5	547	25	1	2.74	.915
2015–16	Admiral Vladivostok	KHL	28	7	11	6	1439	62	3	2.59	.909	2	1	1	119	4	1	2.02	.922
2016–17	Admiral Vladivostok	KHL	38	17	15	4	2175	74	5	2.04	.932	6	2	4	374	18	0	2.89	.888
2017–18	Admiral Vladivostok	KHL	33	9	17	3	1728	74	0	2.57	.917	—	—	—	—	—	—	—	—
2018–19	Avangard Omsk	KHL	49	25	17	4	2682	89	8	1.99	.914	19	12	7	1181	36	3	1.83	.926
2019–20	Avangard Omsk	KHL	48	25	16	6	2816	81	5	1.73	.932	6	2	4	324	20	0	3.70	.882
2020–21	Avangard Omsk	KHL	30	18	7	2	1669	56	1	2.01	.928	7	4	2	407	17	1	2.51	.903
2021–22	Ak Bars Kazan	KHL	16	7	7	0	903	33	2	2.19	.897	—	—	—	—	—	—	—	—
2022–23	Avtomobilist Yekaterinburg	KHL	34	14	13	1	1781	67	2	2.26	.924	3	1	2	173	12	0	4.17	.888
2023–24	Amur Khabarovsk	KHL	44	19	16	5	2536	93	3	2.20	.930	6	2	4	324	15	0	2.78	.923
2024–25	Amur Khabarovsk	KHL	20	3	14	3	1064	52	1	2.93	.897	—	—	—	—	—	—	—	—
2024–25	Neftekhimik Nizhnekamsk	KHL	3	0	3	0	138	11	0	4.80	.861	—	—	—	—	—	—	—	—
AHL totals			51	22	25	2	2858	149	2	3.13	.901	—	—	—	—	—	—	—	—
KHL totals			343	144	136	34	18,930	692	30	2.19	.921	49	24	24	2,902	122	5	2.52	.909

=== International ===
Year	Team	Event	Result	GP	W	L	T	MIN	GA	SO	GAA	SV%
2009	Russia	U18	2nd place, silver medalist(s)	6	4	2	0	360	20	1	3.33	—
2010	Russia	WJC	6th	6	3	3	0	343	13	1	2.45	—
2011	Russia	WJC	1st place, gold medalist(s)	2	1	1	0	93	6	0	3.85	.903
Junior totals				14	8	6	0	796	39	2	—	—

As of the end of the 2023–24 season.

== Awards and honors ==
Award	Year
KHL
All-Star Game	2017, 2019, 2020
Gagarin Cup (Avangard Omsk)	2021
