= Turtiainen =

Turtiainen is a Finnish surname. Notable people with the surname include:

- Ano Turtiainen, Finnish politician
- Arvo Turtiainen (1904–1980), Finnish writer
- Jaakko Turtiainen (born 1991), Finnish professional ice hockey forward
- Toivo Turtiainen (1883–1920), Finnish politician
