= Julius Junttila =

Finnish ice hockey player (born 1991)

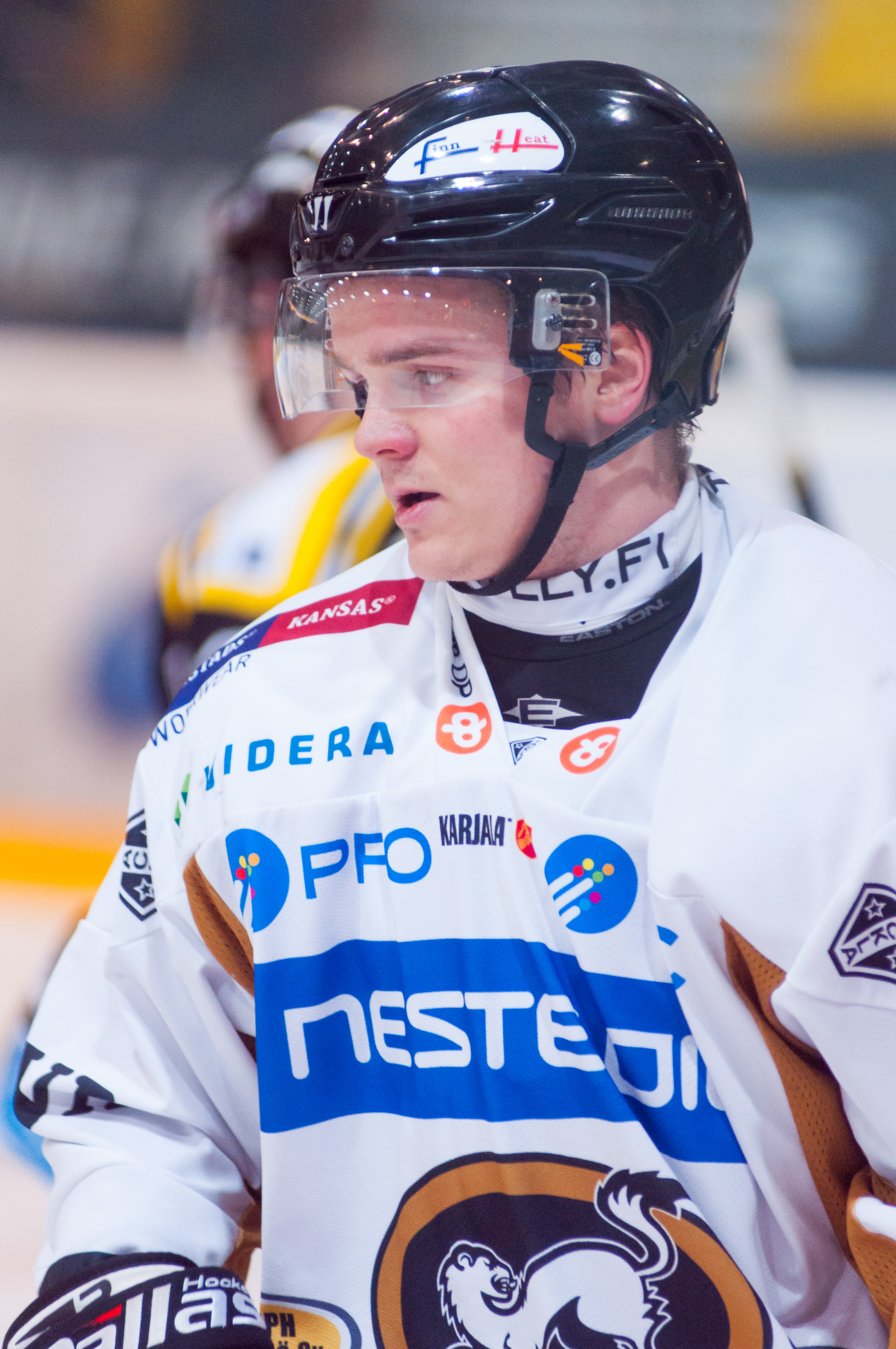
- Junttila with Kärpät, October 2012
- Born: 15 August 1991 (age 35) Oulu, Finland
- Height: 5 ft 10 in (178 cm)
- Weight: 179 lb (81 kg; 12 st 11 lb)
- Position: Forward
- Shoots: Left
- Czech Extraliga team Former teams: BK Mladá Boleslav; Jokerit; Luleå HF; Sibir Novosibirsk; Växjö Lakers; Oulun Kärpät
- National team: Finland
- Playing career: 2009–present

Julius Aleksanteri Junttila (born 15 August 1991) is a Finnish professional ice hockey forward. He currently plays for BK Mladá Boleslav in the Czech Extraliga.

== Playing career ==
Junttila made his SM-liiga debut playing with Oulun Kärpät during the 2009–10 SM-liiga season. After seven seasons in the top flight Liiga, with Oulun Kärpät, he opted to move abroad to Sweden in agreeing to a two-year contract with Luleå HF of the Swedish Hockey League (SHL) on 21 April 2016. He returned to Finland and Kärpät for the 2016–17 season.

On 7 May 2020, Junttila returned to the KHL in signing a two-year contract with Finnish competitors, Jokerit.

After his time in the KHL ended, Junttila returned to Finland, where he continued his career in a Oulun Kärpät. In the 2024/25 season, however, he headed to the Czech Extraliga for the first time, signing with BK Mladá Boleslav.

== Career statistics ==
=== Regular season and playoffs ===
			Regular season					Playoffs
Season	Team	League	GP	G	A	Pts	PIM	GP	G	A	Pts	PIM
2007–08	Kärpät	FIN U18	31	5	7	12	10	—	—	—	—	—
2008–09	Kärpät	FIN U18	22	22	14	36	16	6	3	2	5	4
2009–10	Kärpät	FIN U20	41	27	33	60	30	9	7	6	13	4
2009–10	Kärpät	SM-l	5	3	0	3	0	3	0	1	1	0
2009–10	Hokki	Mestis	1	1	1	2	0	—	—	—	—	—
2010–11	Kärpät	FIN U20	6	2	4	6	6	—	—	—	—	—
2010–11	Kärpät	SM-l	29	4	4	8	6	—	—	—	—	—
2010–11	Kiekko–Laser	Mestis	5	2	4	6	2	—	—	—	—	—
2011–12	Kärpät	SM-l	57	13	15	28	20	9	1	1	2	2
2012–13	Kärpät	SM-l	60	15	10	25	32	3	2	1	3	25
2013–14	Kärpät	Liiga	56	19	15	34	16	16	1	3	4	6
2014–15	Kärpät	Liiga	48	12	21	33	8	19	6	9	15	4
2015–16	Kärpät	Liiga	40	15	10	25	14	11	2	1	3	4
2016–17	Luleå HF	SHL	35	3	7	10	4	2	0	1	1	25
2017–18	Kärpät	Liiga	53	13	39	52	18	18	8	6	14	6
2018–19	Sibir Novosibirsk	KHL	5	0	0	0	0	—	—	—	—	—
2018–19	Växjö Lakers HC	SHL	50	6	13	19	6	7	0	2	2	2
2019–20	Kärpät	Liiga	43	19	21	40	6	—	—	—	—	—
2020–21	Jokerit	KHL	39	3	6	9	4	2	0	0	0	0
2021–22	Jokerit	KHL	35	4	8	12	12	—	—	—	—	—
Liiga totals			391	113	135	248	120	79	20	22	42	47
KHL totals			79	7	14	21	16	2	0	0	0	0

=== International ===
Year	Team	Event	GP	G	A	Pts	PIM
2011	Finland	WJC	6	2	3	5	6
2018	Finland	OG	5	0	1	1	0
Junior totals			6	2	3	5	6
Senior totals			5	0	1	1	0
