= Fredrik Styrman =

Swedish professional ice hockey player (born 1991)

- Born: April 3, 1991 (age 33); Kalix, Sweden
- Height: 5 ft 11 in (180 cm)
- Weight: 179 lb (81 kg; 12 st 11 lb)
- Position: Defence
- Shot: Left
- Played for: Luleå HF; Skellefteå AIK; Brynäs IF; Frölunda HC; HV71
- Playing career: 2006–2022

Fredrik Styrman (born April 3, 1991) is a Swedish former professional ice hockey player. He last played with Luleå HF in Swedish Hockey League (SHL).

On 30 August 2022, Styrman announced his retirement from ice hockey, following an SHL game between Luleå and Djurgårdens IF at Hovet in Stockholm on 14 October 2021, where Djurgardens' Peter Holland ripped off Styrman's helmet, and then punched him repeatedly in the head with his bare fists. Styrman suffered a concussion as a result, and was forced to retire due to lingering concussion symptoms.

== Career statistics ==
=== Regular season and playoffs ===
			Regular season					Playoffs
Season	Team	League	GP	G	A	Pts	PIM	GP	G	A	Pts	PIM
2005–06	Kalix HC	Div.2	17	2	4	6	12	—	—	—	—	—
2006–07	Luleå HF	J20	9	0	1	1	2	—	—	—	—	—
2007–08	Luleå HF	J20	33	3	2	5	12	2	1	0	1	2
2008–09	Luleå HF	J20	27	6	12	18	10	4	1	2	3	27
2008–09	Luleå HF	SEL	25	0	1	1	8	5	0	0	0	4
2008–09	Asplöven HC	Div.1	1	0	0	0	4	—	—	—	—	—
2009–10	Luleå HF	J20	14	1	2	3	14	4	1	2	3	2
2009–10	Luleå HF	SEL	39	0	3	3	16	—	—	—	—	—
2010–11	Luleå HF	SEL	44	0	1	1	16	11	0	1	1	14
2011–12	Skellefteå AIK	SEL	19	1	3	4	0	6	0	0	0	2
2012–13	Skellefteå AIK	SEL	24	0	5	5	16	—	—	—	—	—
2012–13	Brynäs IF	SEL	22	0	1	1	16	3	0	1	1	0
2013–14	IK Oskarshamn	Allsv	50	2	6	8	48	—	—	—	—	—
2014–15	IK Oskarshamn	Allsv	51	4	16	20	36	—	—	—	—	—
2015–16	IK Oskarshamn	Allsv	46	1	8	9	28	5	0	2	2	4
2016–17	IK Oskarshamn	Allsv	48	5	4	9	30	—	—	—	—	—
2017–18	IK Pantern	Allsv	35	0	3	3	26	—	—	—	—	—
2017–18	Frölunda HC	SHL	6	0	0	0	2	—	—	—	—	—
2017–18	HV71	SHL	7	0	0	0	4	2	0	1	1	0
2018–19	Luleå HF	SHL	41	0	3	3	8	9	0	0	0	0
2019–20	Luleå HF	SHL	7	2	0	2	0	—	—	—	—	—
2020–21	Luleå HF	SHL	18	0	1	1	16	7	0	0	0	0
2020–21	Modo Hockey	Allsv	3	0	0	0	0	—	—	—	—	—
2021–22	Luleå HF	SHL	8	0	1	1	2	—	—	—	—	—
SHL totals			260	3	19	22	104	43	0	3	3	20

=== International ===
Year	Team	Event	Result	GP	G	A	Pts	PIM
2009	Sweden	WJC18	5th	6	1	0	1	2
2011	Sweden	WJC	4th	6	0	3	3	2
Junior totals				12	1	3	4	4
