= Corey Mapes =

German ice hockey player

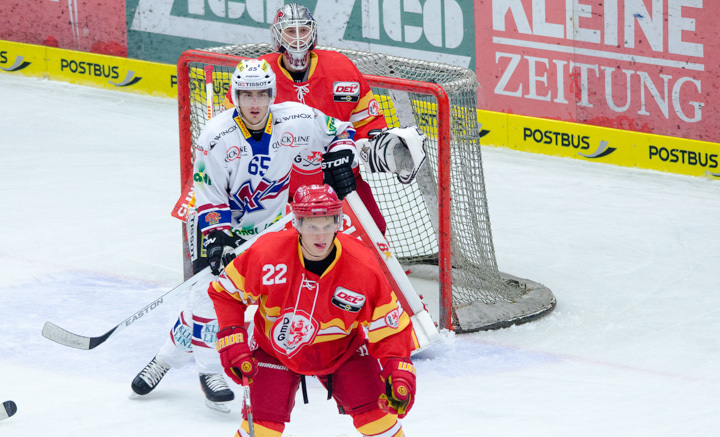
- Born: June 22, 1992 (age 33) Heilbronn, Germany
- Height: 6 ft 1 in (185 cm)
- Weight: 192 lb (87 kg; 13 st 10 lb)
- Position: Defence
- Shoots: Left
- DEL2 team Former teams: Kassel Huskies; Adler Mannheim; Düsseldorfer EG
- Playing career: 2010–present

Corey Mapes (born June 22, 1992) is a German professional ice hockey player. He currently plays for the Kassel Huskies in the DEL2. After playing as a youth and making his professional debut within Adler Mannheim, Mapes was signed to a one-year contract with DEL rival Düsseldorfer EG on May 22, 2013.

After three seasons within the Düsseldorfer organization, Mapes was left uncontracted as a free agent, and signed a one-year deal with DEL2 club, Kassel Huskies on June 22, 2016.

== Career statistics ==
=== Regular season and playoffs ===
| | | | Regular season | | | | | Playoffs |
| Season | Team | League | GP | G | A | Pts | PIM | GP | G | A | Pts | PIM |
|---|---|---|---|---|---|---|---|---|---|---|---|---|
| 2009–10 | Heilbronner Falken | 2.GBun | 5 | 0 | 1 | 1 | 0 | — | — | — | — | — |
| 2010–11 | Heilbronner Falken | 2.GBun | 37 | 3 | 6 | 9 | 69 | 4 | 0 | 0 | 0 | 2 |
| 2010–11 | Adler Mannheim | DEL | 3 | 0 | 0 | 0 | 0 | — | — | — | — | — |
| 2011–12 | Heilbronner Falken | 2.GBun | 43 | 5 | 12 | 17 | 46 | 7 | 0 | 0 | 0 | 14 |
| 2012–13 | Heilbronner Falken | 2.GBun | 48 | 5 | 5 | 10 | 60 | 5 | 0 | 0 | 0 | 4 |
| 2013–14 | Düsseldorfer EG | DEL | 40 | 1 | 1 | 2 | 26 | — | — | — | — | — |
| 2014–15 | Düsseldorfer EG | DEL | 38 | 0 | 5 | 5 | 41 | 12 | 0 | 0 | 0 | 27 |
| 2014–15 | EC Bad Nauheim | DEL2 | 7 | 0 | 1 | 1 | 10 | — | — | — | — | — |
| 2015–16 | Düsseldorfer EG | DEL | 52 | 1 | 3 | 4 | 32 | 5 | 0 | 0 | 0 | 0 |
| DEL totals | | | 133 | 2 | 9 | 11 | 99 | 17 | 0 | 0 | 0 | 27 |

=== International ===
| Year | Team | Event | GP | G | A | Pts | PIM |
|---|---|---|---|---|---|---|---|
| 2009 | Germany | U17 | 5 | 1 | 0 | 1 | 4 |
| 2010 | Germany | WJC18-D1 | 5 | 4 | 5 | 9 | 4 |
| 2011 | Germany | WJC | 6 | 1 | 1 | 2 | 14 |
| 2012 | Germany | WJC-D1 | 5 | 0 | 1 | 1 | 2 |
| Junior totals | | | 21 | 6 | 7 | 13 | 22 |
