= Maxim Berezin =

Russian ice hockey player

- Born: 29 January 1991 (age 34) Izhevsk, Russian SFSR
- Height: 6 ft 3 in (191 cm)
- Weight: 216 lb (98 kg; 15 st 6 lb)
- Position: Defence
- Shoots: Left
- VHL team Former teams: Metallurg Novokuznetsk; Neftkhimik Nizhnekamsk; Avangard Omsk; Avtomobilist Yekaterinburg; Lada Togliatti
- Playing career: 2007–present

Maxim Berezin (born 29 January 1991) is a Russian professional ice hockey defenceman who plays for Metallurg Novokuznetsk of the All-Russian Hockey League (VHL).

== Playing career ==
Berezin started his career in 2007 with HC Neftekhimik Nizhnekamsk of the third-level Pervaya Liga as a seventeen-year-old, where he scored 13 points in 38 games. He would spend most of his 2008–09 season in the second level Vysshaya Liga playing with Neftyanik Leninogorsk, scoring 6 points in 32 games.

He would split his next two seasons between Reaktor Nizhnekamsk of the Molodezhnaya Hokkeinaya Liga and Neftekhimik Nizhnekamsk of the Kontinental Hockey League. Berezin would score a career high in points (36) during his 2009–10 stint with Reaktor Nizhnekamsk.

Following tenures with Avangard Omsk and Avtomobilist Yekaterinburg, Berezin returned to his original club, Neftekhimik Nizhnekamsk, on a two-year contract beginning in the 2021–22 season on 3 August 2021.

As a free agent, Berezin left Neftekhimik for second time in his career, opting to sign a one-year contract with reinstated KHL club, HC Lada Togliatti, for the 2023–24 season on 25 May 2023.

After two seasons with Lada, Berezin agreed to mutually terminate the remaining season of his contract and leave Togliatti as a free agent on 18 August 2025.

== International play ==
Berezin was a member of the Russian team that won the gold medal in the 2011 World Junior Ice Hockey Championships. In seven games, he did not score but had three assists and eight penalty minutes.

== Personal life ==
Berezin is married to Adelya Berezin. The couple has two children: a son, Rodion, and a daughter, Karolina. His son is also involved in ice hockey. Berezin has stated in interviews that he prioritizes stability for his family, which has influenced his career decisions.
