= Juraj Majdan =

Slovak ice hockey player

- Born: 20 August 1991 (age 33); Dubnica nad Váhom, TCH
- Height: 5 ft 10 in (178 cm)
- Weight: 168 lb (76 kg; 12 st 0 lb)
- Position: Forward
- Shoots: Left
- Slovak team Former teams: HK Poprad; HK Skalica; HC Litvínov; HC Slovan Ústečtí Lvi; HC Most; HC '05 Banská Bystrica; HKM Zvolen; HK Nitra; HC Košice; HK Dukla Michalovce; HC Nové Zámky; VHK Vsetín; HK Spišská Nová Ves
- Playing career: 2009–present

Juraj Majdan (born 20 August 1991) is a Slovak professional ice hockey player currently playing for HK Poprad of the Slovak Extraliga.

He played in the Czech Extraliga with HC Litvínov from 2009 to 2015. He also played for Slovak teams HC '05 Banská Bystrica, HKM Zvolen, HK Nitra, HK Dukla Michalovce and HK Spišská Nová Ves. He joined HC Košice on May 29, 2019.

== Career statistics ==
=== Regular season and playoffs ===
			Regular season					Playoffs
Season	Team	League	GP	G	A	Pts	PIM	GP	G	A	Pts	PIM

=== International ===
Year	Team	Event	Result	GP	G	A	Pts	PIM
2009	Slovakia	WJC18	7th	6	1	0	1	10
2011	Slovakia	WJC	8th	6	1	2	3	6
Junior totals				12	2	2	4	16
