= Ryan Bourque =

American ice hockey forward (born 1991)

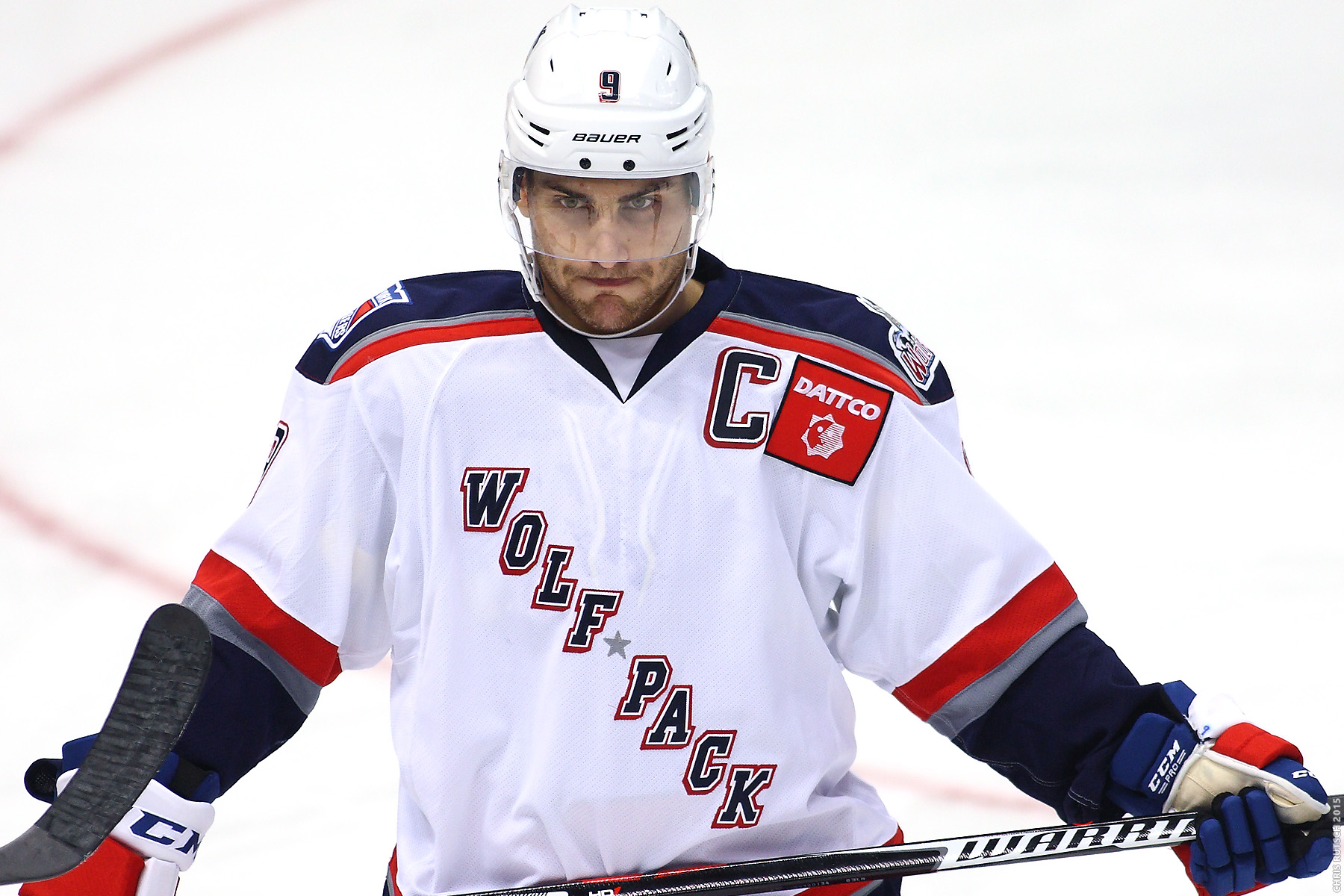
- Bourque with the Hartford Wolf Pack during the 2015-16 season
- Born: January 3, 1991 (age 35) Topsfield, Massachusetts, U.S.
- Height: 5 ft 9 in (175 cm)
- Weight: 170 lb (77 kg; 12 st 2 lb)
- Position: Center
- Shot: Left
- Played for: New York Rangers
- NHL draft: 80th overall, 2009; New York Rangers
- Playing career: 2011–2020

Ryan Bourque (born January 3, 1991) is a Canadian-American former professional ice hockey player, who currently serves as assistant coach for the Providence Bruins of the American Hockey League (AHL). He is the son of Hockey Hall of Fame defenseman Ray Bourque and the brother of former NHL forward Chris Bourque. He was a third round draft choice (80th overall) by the New York Rangers in the 2009 NHL entry draft. He has won four medals in International Ice Hockey Federation (IIHF) playing for the United States – a gold and a bronze medal in World Under 18 Ice Hockey Championship and a gold and a bronze medal in the World Junior Ice Hockey Championships.

== Playing career ==
=== Junior ===
As a youth, Bourque played in the 2003 Quebec International Pee-Wee Hockey Tournament with the Boston Top Gun minor ice hockey team.

After playing high school hockey at the Cushing Academy, Bourque decided to follow in his father's footsteps and play junior hockey in the Quebec Major Junior Hockey League (QMJHL) rather than play college hockey at the University of New Hampshire, whereas his brother Chris decided to play for Boston University. He was drafted in the 7th round by the Quebec Remparts. Playing with Quebec gave Bourque the opportunity to play for his father's former teammate and fellow Hockey Hall of Famer Patrick Roy, who was the Remparts' coach.

With Quebec in 2009–10, Bourque scored 19 goals and had 24 assists for a total of 43 points in 44 games. His 43 points ranked 10th among QMJHL rookies, even though he missed more than 20 games to injuries and international play. He added another 10 points in 9 playoff games. In 2010–11, he scored 26 goals and had 33 assists for 59 points, which ranked 38th overall in the QMJHL, despite only playing 49 games. His 59 regular season points ranked 3rd on the Remparts, and he also ranked 3rd on the team in goals and 5th in assists, even though he missed 19 games. In 18 2011 QMJHL playoff games, Bourque collected 16 points, tying for 13th in the league as of the end of the semi-finals.

On March 16, 2011, Bourque signed a three-year professional entry-level contract with the New York Rangers. Bourque was expected to join the Rangers' American Hockey League affiliate, the Connecticut Whale, for the playoffs after the Remparts' playoff run ended. However, the Whale's playoffs ended prior to the Remparts'.

=== Professional ===
Bourque had an impressive 2011 training camp with the Rangers, leading to his inclusion on the Rangers as the team traveled to Europe for its last exhibition games and the start of the regular season. However, Bourque was assigned to Connecticut before the start of the season and began the 2011–12 season with the Whale. He scored his first professional goal for the Whale on November 4, 2011, against the St. John's IceCaps.

After the 2012–13 Whale season, he was added to the Rangers' playoff roster.

On August 8, 2014, the Rangers announced they had agreed on terms of a contract with Bourque, who was a restricted free agent at the time. The contract is for two years, with an average annual value of $562,500.

He was promoted to the Rangers on April 9, 2015, and made his NHL debut that night against the Ottawa Senators. He did not score but registered one shot on goal and one takeaway; it proved to be his only NHL game. He returned to Hartford on April 12 and then was recalled to the Rangers during the 2015 Stanley Cup playoffs on May 2.

During the 2015–16 season at the NHL trade deadline, Bourque was traded by the Rangers to the Washington Capitals in exchange for Chris Brown on February 28, 2016. He was directly assigned to AHL affiliate, the Hershey Bears, marking a reunion with older brother Chris. After a run to the Calder Cup finals with the Bears, Bourque opted to continue in Hershey agreeing to a one-year AHL contract as a free agent on July 6, 2016.

As an unsigned free agent from the Bears after parts of two seasons, Bourque was unable to secure a contract over the summer. He accepted an AHL try-out contract to attend the Bridgeport Sound Tigers training camp on September 24, 2017. After a successful tryout, Bourque signed a one-year AHL contract to remain with the Sound Tigers on September 29.

During his third year with the Sound Tigers in 2019–20 season, Bourque contributed with 11 points in 49 games before he was traded by Bridgeport to the Charlotte Checkers in exchange for Terry Broadhurst and Cedric Lacroix on March 2, 2020. Bourque made 4 appearances with the Checkers before the season was cancelled due to the COVID-19 pandemic.

On August 25, 2020, after nine seasons Bourque announced his retirement from professional hockey, opting to pursue a new career as a business development manager with Actual Energy based out of Sandwich, Massachusetts.

=== Coaching career ===
On March 7, 2022, he was named as an interim assistant coach in the Washington Capitals system, and the South Carolina Stingrays, the Capitals ECHL club, removed the tag, making him the assistant coach for the 2022–23 season.

On April 24, 2024, Bourque returned to his alma mater, Cushing Academy, to serve as head coach for the Varsity A boys ice hockey team. Under Bourque's leadership, the team won the Boys Elite 8 New England Preparatory School Athletic Council (NEPSAC) Championship in the 2024–25 season.

In 2025 he joined the Providence Bruins as an assistant coach.

== International play ==
Medal record

Representing (United States) USA

Ice hockey

World Junior Championships
Bronze medal – third place	2011 USA	
Gold medal – first place	2010 Canada	

World U18 Championships
Gold medal – first place	2009 USA	
Bronze medal – third place	2008 Russia	

A dual citizen of the United States and Canada, Bourque chose to represent the United States in international hockey play. Bourque won a bronze medal in the 2008 IIHF World U18 Championships with Team USA and the following year was a member of Team USA's gold medal-winning 2009 World U18 Championship team. He scored two goals and had three assists for the 2008 bronze medal winners. He scored 1 goal and had 6 assists in 7 games for the 2009 gold medal winners, and led the team with 32 shots on goal.

The following year, he was a member of the USA's 2010 gold-medal World Junior Championship team. He scored no goals but earned three assists during the tournament. His teammates on the gold medal winners included fellow Rangers' draft picks Derek Stepan and Chris Kreider. The next year, he was an alternate captain for the USA's bronze medal-winning 2011 World Junior Championship team. He once again earned three assists in the tournament. One of his assists came on the game-winning goal in the bronze-medal game. He was named Team USA's best player in their win over Switzerland. He also tied Chris Kreider for the 2nd on the team in shots on goal with 20.

== Personal life ==
Bourque is the son of Hockey Hall of Famer Ray Bourque and his wife Christiane. His older brother, Chris, is also professional hockey player and played for the Washington Capitals He also has an older sister, Melissa.

Bourque is married to his wife Maria they have two sons together. He is actively involved with his family charity organization called The Bourque Foundation.

== Career statistics ==
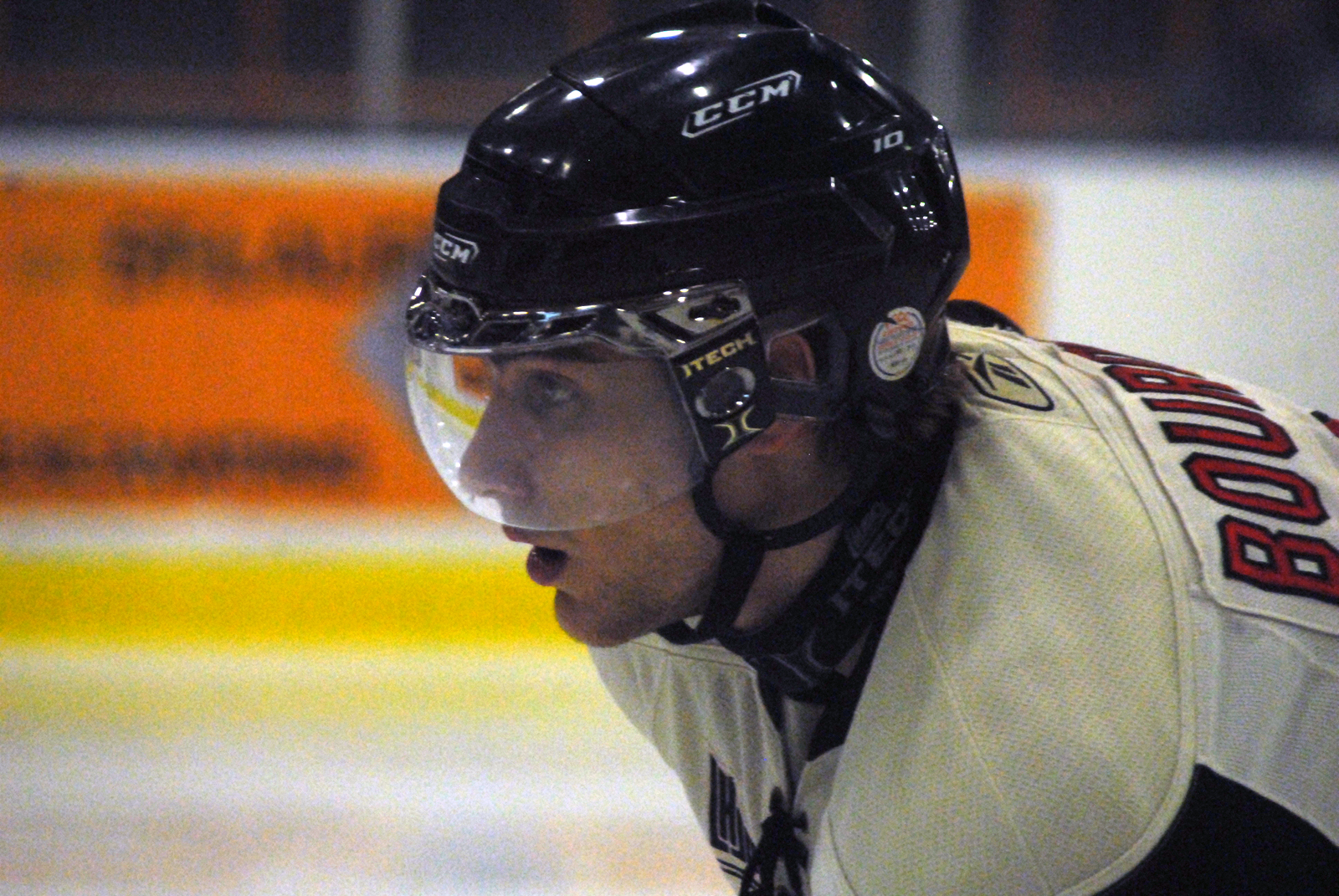
Bourque with the Quebec Remparts in 2011

=== Regular season and playoffs ===
			Regular season					Playoffs
Season	Team	League	GP	G	A	Pts	PIM	GP	G	A	Pts	PIM
2009–10	Quebec Remparts	QMJHL	44	19	24	43	20	9	3	7	10	6
2010–11	Quebec Remparts	QMJHL	49	26	33	59	22	19	5	11	16	8
2011–12	Connecticut Whale	AHL	69	6	8	14	10	9	2	1	3	4
2012–13	Connecticut Whale	AHL	53	8	7	15	11	—	—	—	—	—
2013–14	Hartford Wolf Pack	AHL	74	21	16	37	22	—	—	—	—	—
2014–15	Hartford Wolf Pack	AHL	73	12	20	32	27	5	0	1	1	2
2014–15	New York Rangers	NHL	1	0	0	0	0	—	—	—	—	—
2015–16	Hartford Wolf Pack	AHL	56	10	14	24	15	—	—	—	—	—
2015–16	Hershey Bears	AHL	19	1	4	5	8	21	2	3	5	2
2016–17	Hershey Bears	AHL	53	4	10	14	16	12	0	0	0	4
2017–18	Bridgeport Sound Tigers	AHL	75	12	22	34	26	—	—	—	—	—
2018–19	Bridgeport Sound Tigers	AHL	60	6	10	16	39	5	0	0	0	0
2019–20	Bridgeport Sound Tigers	AHL	49	4	7	11	13	—	—	—	—	—
2019–20	Charlotte Checkers	AHL	4	1	0	1	2	—	—	—	—	—
NHL totals			1	0	0	0	0	—	—	—	—	—

=== International ===
Year	Team	Event	Result	GP	G	A	Pts	PIM
2008	United States	WJC18	3rd place, bronze medalist(s)	7	2	3	5	4
2009	United States	WJC18	1st place, gold medalist(s)	7	1	6	7	12
2010	United States	WJC	1st place, gold medalist(s)	7	0	3	3	8
2011	United States	WJC	3rd place, bronze medalist(s)	6	0	3	3	4
Junior totals				27	3	15	18	28

== See also ==
- List of players who played only one game in the NHL
