= Patrick Cehlin =

Swedish professional ice hockey player

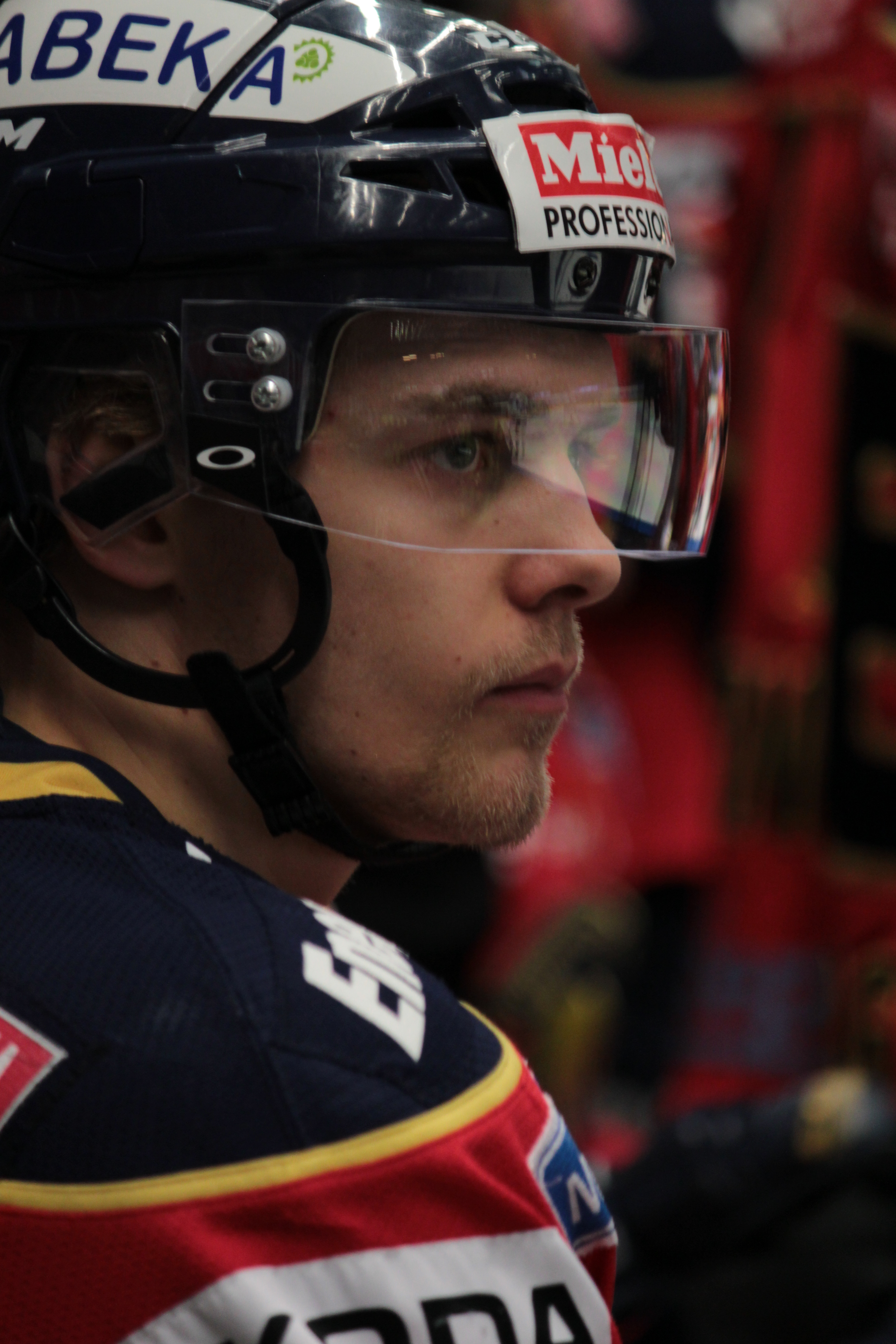
- Born: July 27, 1991 (age 34) Stockholm, Sweden
- Height: 5 ft 11 in (180 cm)
- Weight: 185 lb (84 kg; 13 st 3 lb)
- Position: Right Wing
- Shoots: Right
- SHL team Former teams: Free Agent; Djurgårdens IF; Milwaukee Admirals; Leksands IF; Rögle BK; Luleå HF
- National team: Sweden
- NHL draft: 126th overall, 2010; Nashville Predators
- Playing career: 2009–present

Patrick Cehlin (pæt-rek se-liːn) (born July 27, 1991) is a Swedish professional ice hockey player, currently an unrestricted free agent. He most recently played for Luleå HF in the Swedish Hockey League (SHL). Cehlin was formerly a prospect for the Nashville Predators of the National Hockey League.

== Playing career ==
Cehlin joined Djurgården's U18 team in May 2006 from his first club, Flemingsbergs IK. He became Swedish U18 champion with Djurgården for the 2007–08 season. Cehlin made his Elitserien debut on December 26, 2008 against Rögle BK, but played in Djurgården's J20-team for most of the 2008–09 season. He scored his first goal in Elitserien on October 8, 2009 against Luleå HF.

Cehlin was drafted in the 5th round (126th overall) of the 2010 NHL draft by the Nashville Predators. He was signed to a three-year entry-level contract with the Predators on June 5, 2012. Cehlin played his first North American game on October 12, 2012, against the Grand Rapids Griffins as a member of the Milwaukee Admirals where he tallied his first two career goals.

On May 19, 2015, after spending half of the previous season in Sweden on loan from the Predators with Leksands IF, Cehlin opted to continue his career in his native land in signing a two-year contract with Rögle BK.

== Career statistics ==
=== Regular season and playoffs ===
			Regular season					Playoffs
Season	Team	League	GP	G	A	Pts	PIM	GP	G	A	Pts	PIM
2007–08	Djurgårdens IF	J20	22	5	3	8	8	4	0	1	1	4
2008–09	Djurgårdens IF	J20	36	10	25	35	110	6	1	2	3	2
2008–09	Djurgårdens IF	SEL	2	0	0	0	0	—	—	—	—	—
2009–10	Djurgårdens IF	J20	9	3	3	6	4	—	—	—	—	—
2009–10	Djurgårdens IF	SEL	54	5	6	11	10	16	0	2	2	2
2010–11	Djurgårdens IF	J20	—	—	—	—	—	5	4	2	6	0
2010–11	Djurgårdens IF	SEL	48	4	12	16	14	7	1	0	1	2
2011–12	Djurgårdens IF	SEL	48	10	4	14	20	—	—	—	—	—
2012–13	Milwaukee Admirals	AHL	70	9	23	32	28	4	1	0	1	0
2012–13	Cincinnati Cyclones	ECHL	1	1	0	1	0	—	—	—	—	—
2013–14	Milwaukee Admirals	AHL	38	6	18	24	33	2	1	1	2	0
2014–15	Milwaukee Admirals	AHL	4	0	0	0	2	—	—	—	—	—
2014–15	Cincinnati Cyclones	ECHL	9	3	1	4	6	—	—	—	—	—
2014–15	Leksands IF	SHL	13	2	0	2	4	—	—	—	—	—
2015–16	Rögle BK	SHL	52	20	16	36	52	—	—	—	—	—
2016–17	Rögle BK	SHL	17	6	3	9	4	—	—	—	—	—
2017–18	Luleå HF	SHL	36	14	10	24	18	3	1	2	3	4
SHL totals			270	61	51	112	122	26	2	4	6	8

=== International ===
Year	Team	Event	Result	GP	G	A	Pts	PIM
2009	Sweden	WJC18	5th	6	2	2	4	37
2011	Sweden	WJC	4th	6	4	2	6	18
2016	Sweden	WC	6th	4	0	0	0	0
Junior totals				12	6	4	10	55
Senior totals				4	0	0	0	0
