= Sebastian Wännström =

Swedish ice hockey player

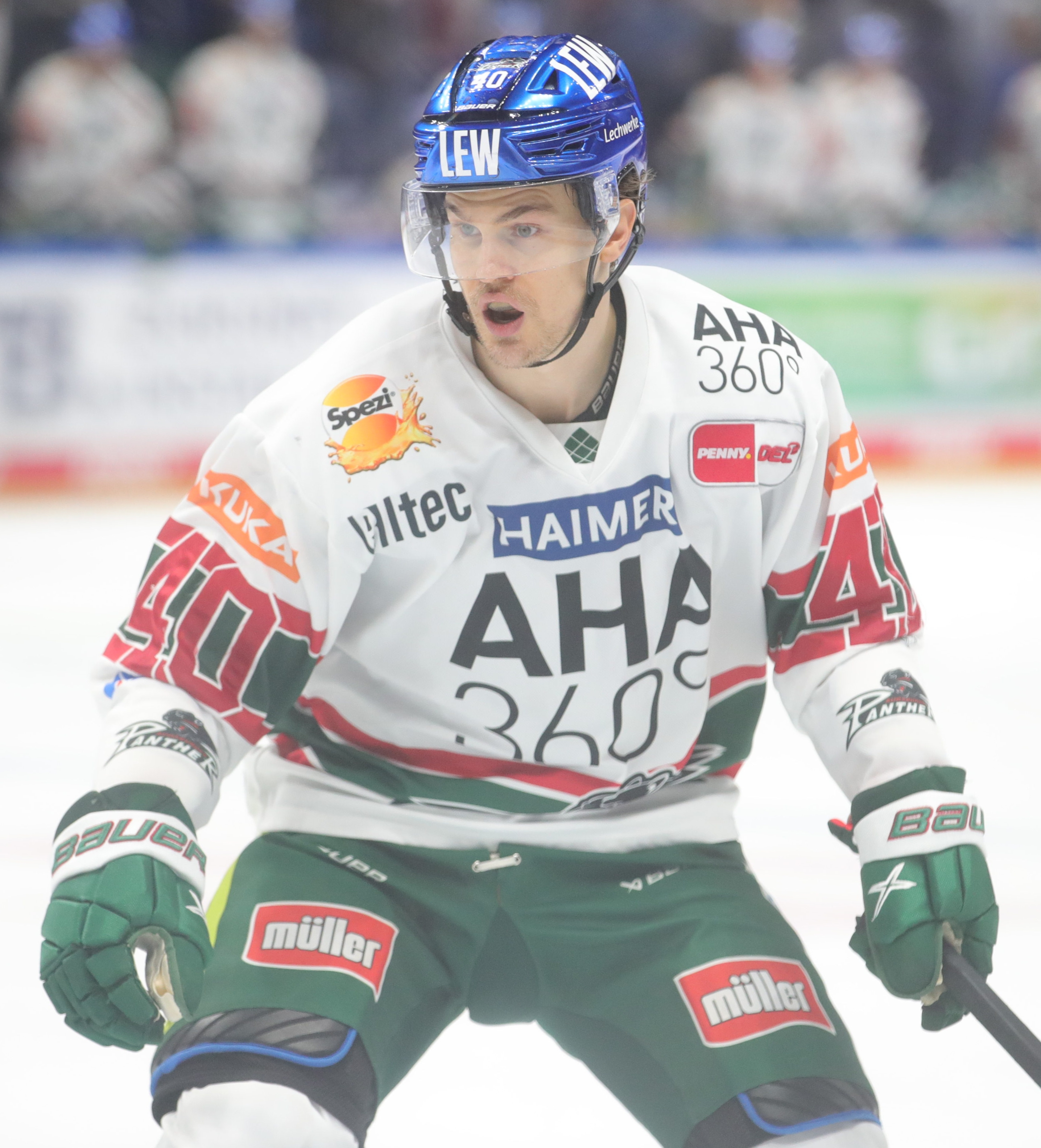
- Wännström with the Augsburger Panther in 2023
- Born: March 3, 1991 (age 35) Gävle, Sweden
- Height: 6 ft 0 in (183 cm)
- Weight: 176 lb (80 kg; 12 st 8 lb)
- Position: Right wing
- Shoots: Right
- team Former teams: Free agent Brynäs IF; Chicago Wolves; Rögle BK; HV71; Leksands IF; Ässät; Dinamo Riga; HC Ajoie; Augsburger Panther
- NHL draft: 44th overall, 2010; St. Louis Blues
- Playing career: 2009–present

Sebastian Wännström (born March 3, 1991) is a Swedish ice hockey player, currently playing with Vaasan Sport in the Finnish Liiga. Before that, he played with Augsburger Panther of the Deutsche Eishockey Liga (DEL).

== Playing career ==
Wännström made his professional debut with his original club, Brynäs IF of the Swedish Hockey League. He was drafted in the second round, 44th overall by the St. Louis Blues of the NHL in the 2010 NHL entry draft.

Wännström's first Elitserien goal was a game-winning penalty shot on October 20, 2011, against Johan Gustafsson of Luleå HF.

After completing the final year of his entry-level contract with the St. Louis Blues, failing to establish himself in American Hockey League with Blues affiliate, the Chicago Wolves, Wännström returned to his native Sweden in signing a two-year contract with Rögle BK of the SHL on May 19, 2015.

Wännström left the club as a free agent following the 2016–17 season, agreeing to a two-year contract with current champions, HV71, on May 10, 2017.

After the 2018–19 season, having fulfilled his contract with HV71, Wännström left to sign a two-year SHL contract with the newly promoted Leksands IF on April 11, 2019.

In the 2020–21 season, he played with Ässät of the Finnish Liiga and was noted as the player of the month in February 2021. He was also the league-leading goal scorer for the season with 33 goals through 58 regular-season games.

On 23 April 2021, Wännström signed his first contract in the KHL, agreeing to a one-year deal with Latvian based club, Dinamo Riga.

== Career statistics ==
=== Regular season and playoffs ===
			Regular season					Playoffs
Season	Team	League	GP	G	A	Pts	PIM	GP	G	A	Pts	PIM
2007–08	Brynäs IF	J20	15	0	4	4	8	—	—	—	—	—
2008–09	Brynäs IF	J20	32	11	9	20	4	6	0	0	0	0
2009–10	Brynäs IF	J20	35	30	27	57	55	5	2	3	5	0
2009–10	Brynäs IF	SEL	18	0	0	0	2	1	0	0	0	0
2010–11	Brynäs IF	J20	7	5	4	9	0	1	0	0	0	10
2010–11	Brynäs IF	SEL	45	0	2	2	6	5	0	0	0	0
2010–11	Leksands IF	Allsv	2	0	0	0	0	—	—	—	—	—
2011–12	Brynäs IF	J20	5	2	1	3	2	—	—	—	—	—
2011–12	Brynäs IF	SEL	43	8	7	15	20	17	2	5	7	4
2012–13	Peoria Rivermen	AHL	16	1	2	3	4	—	—	—	—	—
2012–13	Evansville IceMen	ECHL	14	6	1	7	12	—	—	—	—	—
2012–13	Brynäs IF	SEL	9	0	0	0	8	4	0	0	0	2
2013–14	Chicago Wolves	AHL	37	5	5	10	20	6	1	2	3	6
2013–14	Kalamazoo Wings	ECHL	4	3	2	5	2	—	—	—	—	—
2014–15	Chicago Wolves	AHL	36	3	9	12	12	—	—	—	—	—
2015–16	Rögle BK	SHL	50	14	7	21	24	—	—	—	—	—
2016–17	Rögle BK	SHL	20	9	9	18	8	—	—	—	—	—
2017–18	HV71	SHL	26	8	8	16	10	2	0	0	0	0
2018–19	HV71	SHL	48	9	9	18	12	6	2	1	3	0
2019–20	Leksands IF	SHL	49	10	4	14	12	—	—	—	—	—
2020–21	Ässät	Liiga	58	33	13	46	33	—	—	—	—	—
2021–22	Dinamo Riga	KHL	10	1	0	1	2	—	—	—	—	—
2021–22	HC Ajoie	NL	19	5	4	9	2	—	—	—	—	—
2022–23	Augsburger Panther	DEL	56	18	13	31	2	—	—	—	—	—
SHL totals			308	58	46	104	100	35	4	6	10	6

=== International ===
Year	Team	Event	Result	GP	G	A	Pts	PIM
2011	Sweden	WJC	4th	6	3	2	5	2
Junior totals				6	3	2	5	2
