= Jesper Thörnberg =

Swedish ice hockey player (born 1991)

- Born: March 15, 1991 (age 35) Jönköping, Sweden
- Height: 5 ft 9 in (175 cm)
- Weight: 176 lb (80 kg; 12 st 8 lb)
- Position: Left wing
- Shoots: Left
- Metal team Former teams: Frederikshavn White Hawks; HV71; Herlev Eagles; HC TWK Innsbruck
- Playing career: 2010–present

Jesper Thörnberg (born March 15, 1991) is a Swedish professional ice hockey player who is currently playing with the Frederikshavn White Hawks in the Metal Ligaen (DEN).

Thörnberg made his Elitserien debut during the 2010–11 season. Jesper is the younger brother of Martin Thörnberg who played extensively with HV71.

== Career statistics ==
=== Regular season and playoffs ===
			Regular season					Playoffs
Season	Team	League	GP	G	A	Pts	PIM	GP	G	A	Pts	PIM
2008–09	HV71	J20	37	5	13	18	43	7	1	1	2	8
2009–10	HV71	J20	41	22	26	48	64	3	0	0	0	2
2010–11	HV71	J20	26	14	15	29	61	4	4	3	7	0
2010–11	HV71	SEL	23	0	0	0	2	3	0	0	0	0
2011–12	HV71	J20	11	4	8	12	12	—	—	—	—	—
2011–12	HV71	SEL	37	2	1	3	10	6	0	1	1	0
2011–12	IF Troja/Ljungby	Allsv	5	1	1	2	4	—	—	—	—	—
2012–13	HV71	SEL	8	0	1	1	2	—	—	—	—	—
2012–13	Södertälje SK	Allsv	30	4	6	10	47	5	1	0	1	2
2013–14	Södertälje SK	Allsv	43	14	7	21	44	—	—	—	—	—
2013–14	IF Björklöven	Allsv	2	1	1	2	0	—	—	—	—	—
2014–15	Södertälje SK	Allsv	19	0	0	0	2	—	—	—	—	—
2014–15	IF Björklöven	Allsv	21	6	7	13	10	5	0	1	1	2
2015–16	IF Björklöven	Allsv	48	16	11	27	53	—	—	—	—	—
2016–17	IF Björklöven	Allsv	34	10	7	17	24	—	—	—	—	—
2017–18	IF Troja/Ljungby	Allsv	46	9	6	15	20	—	—	—	—	—
2018–19	Herlev Eagles	DEN	40	33	25	58	75	6	4	5	9	4
2019–20	HC TWK Innsbruck	EBEL	45	10	31	41	24	—	—	—	—	—
2020–21	HC Dalen	Div.1	20	15	15	30	12	—	—	—	—	—
2020–21	Herlev Eagles	DEN	16	16	5	21	37	4	4	0	4	0
2021–22	HC Dalen	Div.1	41	27	24	51	42	15	5	12	17	20
2021–22	HV71	Allsv	6	1	0	1	0	—	—	—	—	—
SEL totals			68	2	2	4	14	9	0	1	1	0

=== International ===
Year	Team	Event	Result	GP	G	A	Pts	PIM
2011	Sweden	WJC	4th	6	1	2	3	0
Junior totals				6	1	2	3	0
