= Nikita Pivtsakin =

Russian ice hockey player

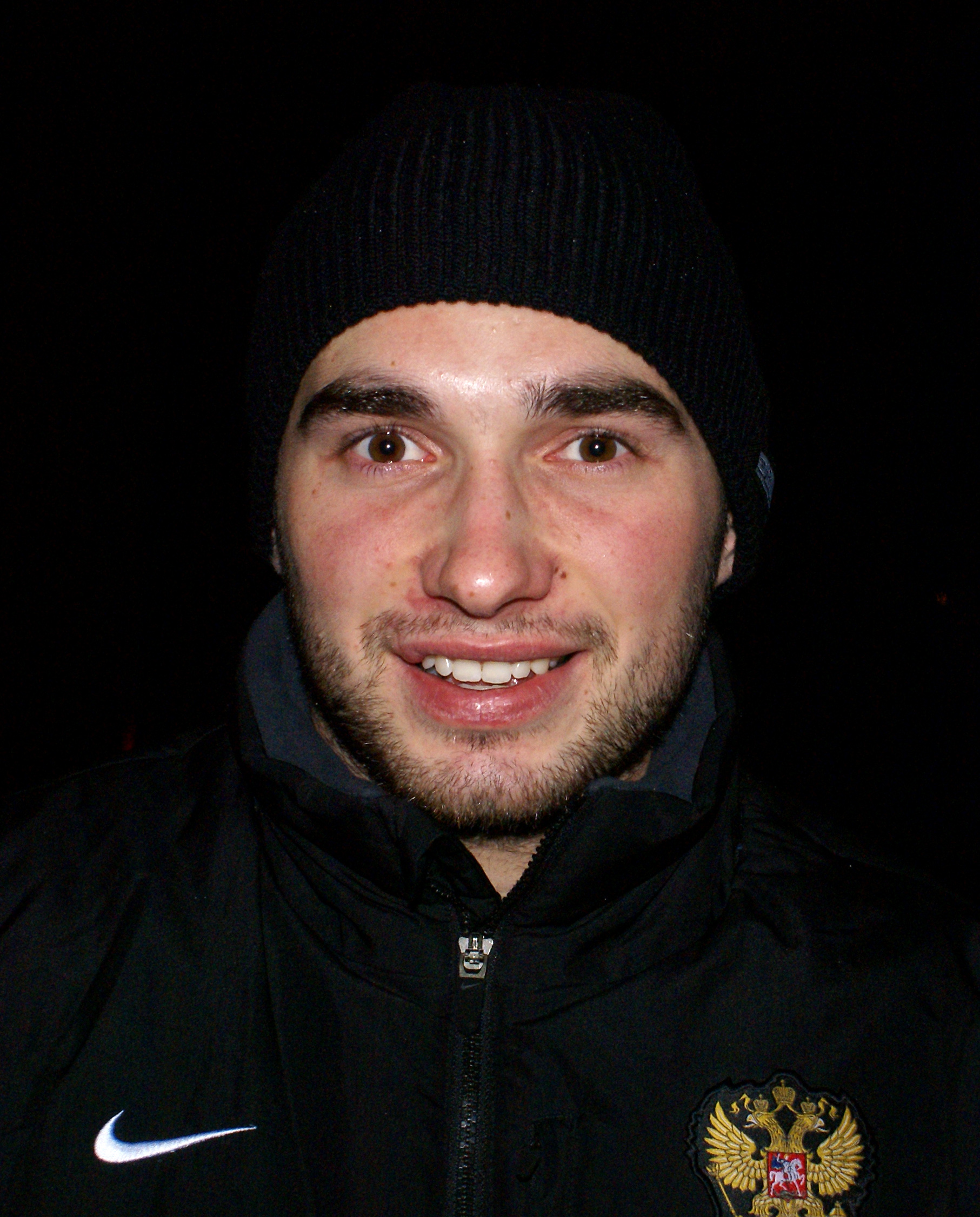
- Born: July 23, 1991 (age 33); Omsk, Russian SFSR, Soviet Union
- Height: 5 ft 10 in (178 cm)
- Weight: 194 lb (88 kg; 13 st 12 lb)
- Position: Defence
- Shoots: Left
- KHL team Former teams: Free Agent; Avangard Omsk; CSKA Moscow; Metallurg Magnitogorsk; Spartak Moscow; Amur Khabarovsk; KalPa; HC Sochi
- Playing career: 2008–present

Nikita Pivtsakin (born July 23, 1991) is a Russian professional ice hockey defenceman who is currently an unrestricted free agent. He most recently playied under contract with HC Sochi of the Kontinental Hockey League (KHL).

== Playing career ==
Pivtsakin originally made his professional debut in the KHL with Avangard Omsk in the 2008–09 season.

On June 9, 2018, Pivtsakin was returned to Avangard Omsk in a trade with Metallurg Magnitogorsk, where he split the previous 2017–18 season after an earlier trade with CSKA Moscow.

Following a lone season with HC Spartak Moscow in 2020–21, Pivtsakin opted to sign a one-year contract to join Amur Khabarovsk on 5 May 2021.

== Career statistics ==
=== Regular season and playoffs ===
			Regular season					Playoffs
Season	Team	League	GP	G	A	Pts	PIM	GP	G	A	Pts	PIM
2008–09	Avangard Omsk	KHL	1	0	0	0	0	—	—	—	—	—
2009–10	Omsk Hawks	MHL	4	0	0	0	0	6	1	1	2	6
2009–10	Avangard Omsk	KHL	19	0	0	0	2	—	—	—	—	—
2010–11	Omsk Hawks	MHL	4	1	2	3	6	—	—	—	—	—
2010–11	Avangard Omsk	KHL	32	0	5	5	20	11	1	0	1	2
2011–12	Omsk Hawks	MHL	8	0	3	3	6	—	—	—	—	—
2011–12	Avangard Omsk	KHL	43	1	5	6	30	15	3	1	4	2
2012–13	Avangard Omsk	KHL	52	2	8	10	33	12	0	1	1	10
2013–14	Avangard Omsk	KHL	54	2	8	10	28	—	—	—	—	—
2014–15	Avangard Omsk	KHL	51	4	9	13	12	—	—	—	—	—
2015–16	CSKA Moscow	KHL	20	0	1	1	27	14	0	2	2	4
2016–17	CSKA Moscow	KHL	41	4	8	12	27	4	0	0	0	0
2017–18	CSKA Moscow	KHL	2	0	0	0	0	—	—	—	—	—
2017–18	Metallurg Magnitogorsk	KHL	45	9	12	21	26	11	0	0	0	4
2018–19	Avangard Omsk	KHL	38	4	3	7	29	19	1	2	3	0
2019–20	Avangard Omsk	KHL	22	1	2	3	29	—	—	—	—	—
2019–20	Metallurg Magnitogorsk	KHL	16	1	4	5	8	4	0	3	3	0
2020–21	Spartak Moscow	KHL	29	2	0	2	22	—	—	—	—	—
2021–22	Amur Khabarovsk	KHL	30	1	1	2	11	—	—	—	—	—
2021–22	KalPa	Liiga	16	1	3	4	25	—	—	—	—	—
2022–23	HC Sochi	KHL	50	2	4	6	12	—	—	—	—	—
KHL totals			545	33	70	103	316	90	5	9	14	22

=== International ===
Year	Team	Event	Result	GP	G	A	Pts	PIM
2008	Russia	U17	5th	5	0	1	1	4
2008	Russia	IH18	2nd place, silver medalist(s)	4	1	1	2	4
2009	Russia	U18	2nd place, silver medalist(s)	7	0	1	1	10
2010	Russia	WJC	6th	6	0	1	1	2
2011	Russia	WJC	1st place, gold medalist(s)	7	0	1	1	2
Junior totals				29	1	5	6	22
