= Michal Hlinka =

Czech ice hockey player

- Born: March 19, 1991 (age 34); Nový Jičín, Czechoslovakia
- Height: 6 ft 3 in (191 cm)
- Weight: 201 lb (91 kg; 14 st 5 lb)
- Position: Forward
- Shoots: Left
- Chance Liga team Former teams: HC RT Torax Poruba; HC Vítkovice; HC Dukla Jihlava
- NHL draft: Undrafted
- Playing career: 2010–present

Michal Hlinka (born March 19, 1991) is a Czech professional ice hockey player. He is currently playing with HC RT Torax Poruba in the Chance Liga.

Hlinka previously played 196 games in the Czech Extraliga for HC Vítkovice and HC Dukla Jihlava.
