= Henri Tuominen =

Finnish ice hockey player

- Born: September 10, 1991 (age 33); Turku, Finland
- Height: 6 ft 3 in (191 cm)
- Weight: 190 lb (86 kg; 13 st 8 lb)
- Position: Centre
- Shoots: Left
- SM-liiga team: Ilves
- NHL draft: Undrafted
- Playing career: 2010–present

Henri Tuominen (born September 10, 1991) is a Finnish professional ice hockey forward who is currently playing for Ilves in the SM-liiga.
