= Nikita Dvurechensky =

Russian professional ice hockey forward

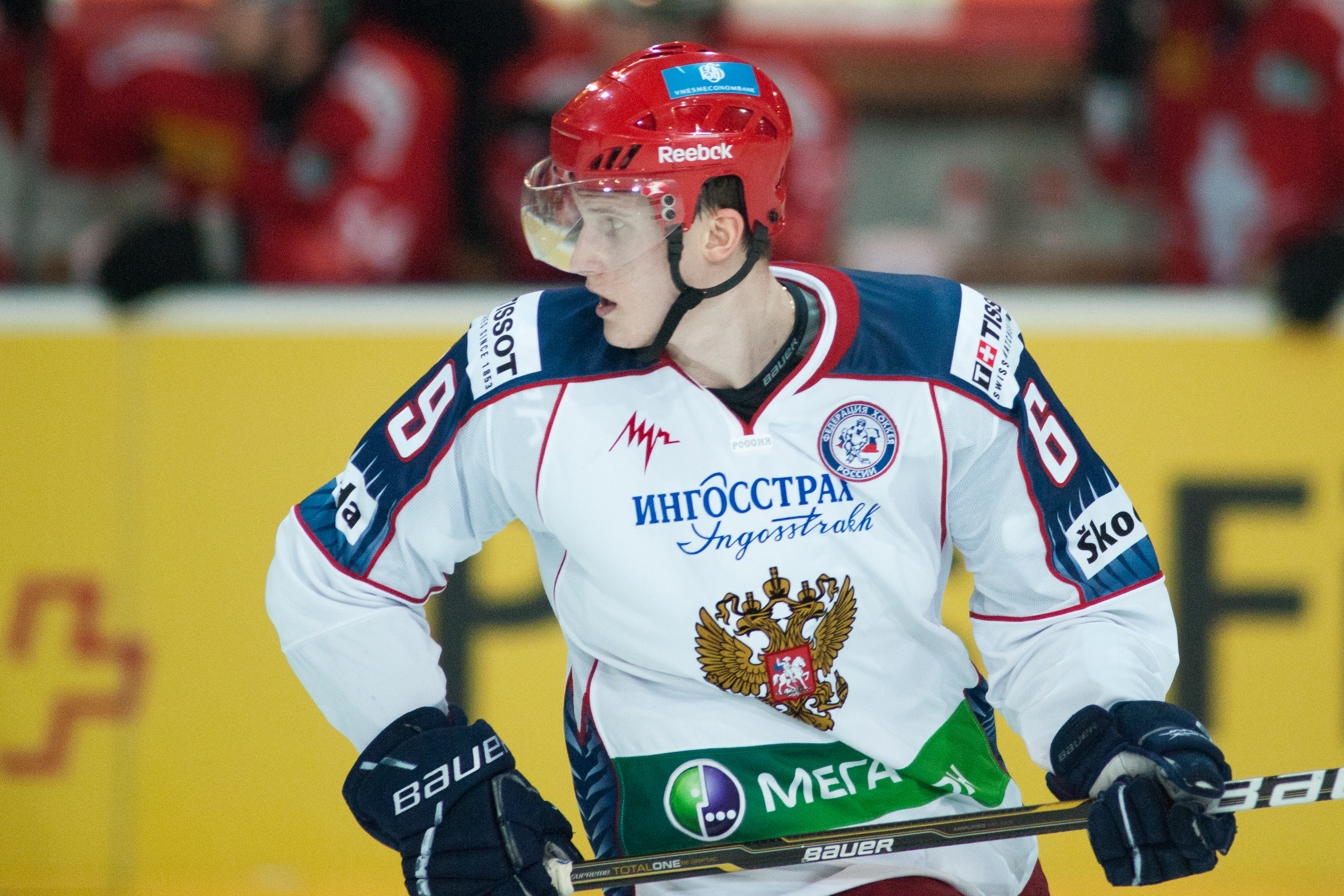
- Born: July 30, 1991 (age 33); Lipetsk, Russian SFSR, Soviet Union
- Height: 6 ft 2 in (188 cm)
- Weight: 187 lb (85 kg; 13 st 5 lb)
- Position: Left wing
- Shoots: Left
- BHL team Former teams: HC Shakhtyor Soligorsk; Dynamo Moscow; HC Vityaz; HC Sibir Novosibirsk; Torpedo Nizhny Novgorod; Neftekhimik Nizhnekamsk; HC Yugra
- National team: Russia
- Playing career: 2009–present

Nikita Kirillovich Dvurechensky (Russian: Ники́та Кири́ллович Двуре́ченский; born July 30, 1991, in Lipetsk) is a Russian professional ice hockey forward who is currently playing for HC Shakhtyor Soligorsk of the Belarusian Extraleague.

He played in the Kontinental Hockey League (KHL) for Dynamo Moscow, HC Vityaz, HC Sibir Novosibirsk, Torpedo Nizhny Novgorod, Neftekhimik Nizhnekamsk and HC Yugra.
