= Semyon Valuysky =

Russian ice hockey player

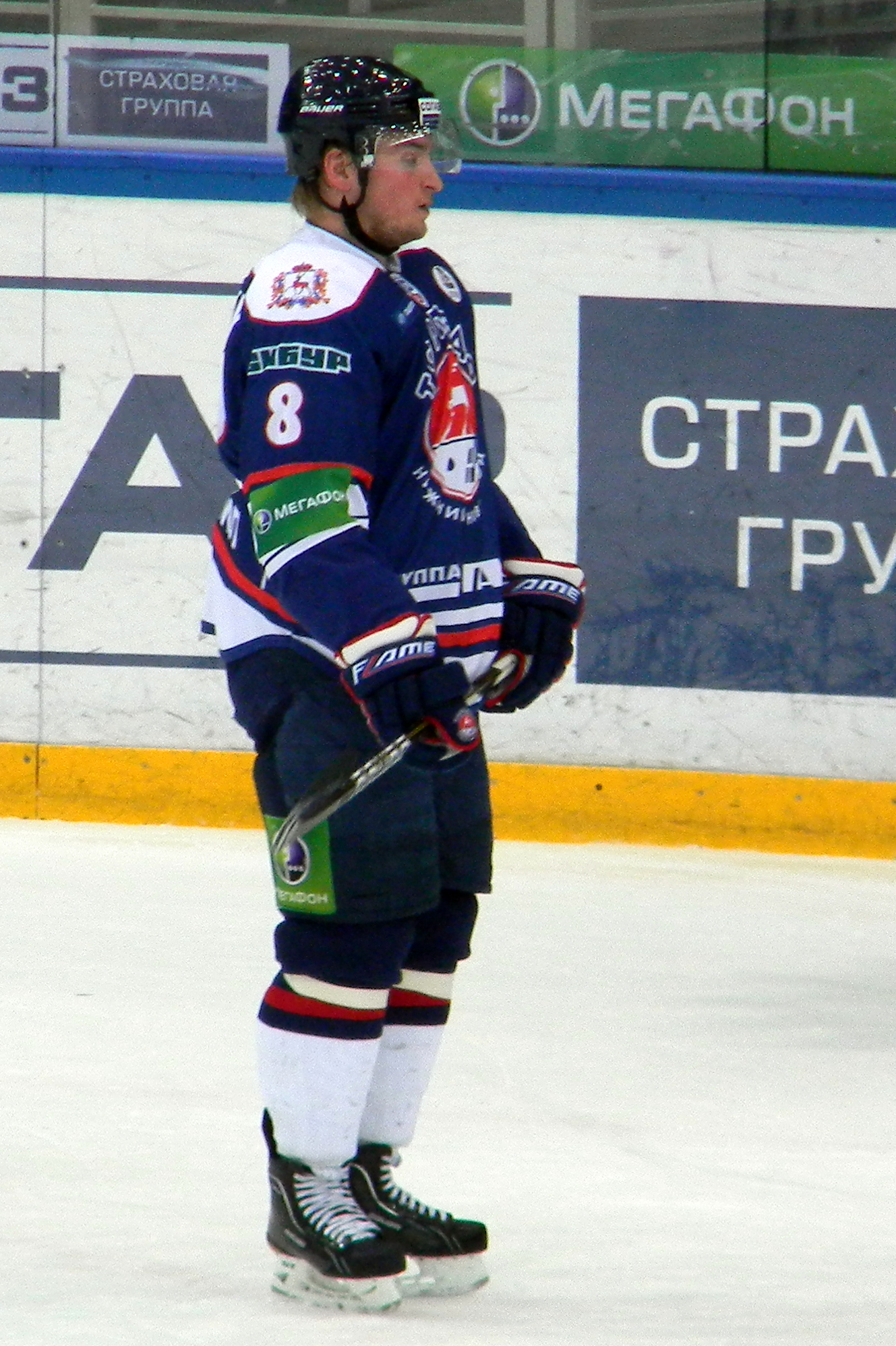
- Born: February 10, 1991 (age 34); Togliatti, Russian SFSR, Soviet Union
- Height: 5 ft 10 in (178 cm)
- Weight: 190 lb (86 kg; 13 st 8 lb)
- Position: Left wing
- Shoots: Right
- VHL team Former teams: HC Yugra; Torpedo Nizhny Novgorod; Metallurg Novokuznetsk; Lada Togliatti; Admiral Vladivostok
- Playing career: 2008–present

Semyon Valuysky (born February 10, 1991) is a Russian professional ice hockey forward who currently plays for HC Yugra of the Supreme Hockey League (VHL). He has formerly played for Torpedo Nizhny Novgorod, Metallurg Novokuznetsk, Lada Togliatti and Admiral Vladivostok.

== Career statistics ==
			Regular season					Playoffs
Season	Team	League	GP	G	A	Pts	PIM	GP	G	A	Pts	PIM
2005–06	HC Lada Togliatti-2	Russia3	6	0	0	0	0	—	—	—	—	—
2006–07	HC Lada Togliatti-2	Russia3	28	5	6	11	14	—	—	—	—	—
2007–08	HC Lada Togliatti-2	Russia3	34	17	14	31	8	8	0	0	0	8
2008–09	HC Lada Togliatti	KHL	19	1	1	2	12	1	0	0	0	0
2008–09	HC Lada Togliatti-2	Russia3	30	12	10	22	18	3	3	0	3	2
2009–10	HC Lada Togliatti	KHL	32	2	5	7	22	—	—	—	—	—
2009–10	Ladia Togliatti	MHL	7	0	3	3	10	—	—	—	—	—
2010–11	Torpedo Nizhny Novgorod	KHL	39	6	1	7	10	—	—	—	—	—
2010–11	HC Sarov	VHL	2	1	0	1	0	2	0	0	0	2
2011–12	Torpedo Nizhny Novgorod	KHL	34	3	3	6	18	5	0	0	0	2
2011–12	HC Sarov	VHL	10	2	3	5	14	—	—	—	—	—
2012–13	Torpedo Nizhny Novgorod	KHL	41	1	3	4	8	—	—	—	—	—
2012–13	HC Sarov	VHL	2	0	0	0	4	—	—	—	—	—
2013–14	Metallurg Novokuznetsk	KHL	39	9	8	17	14	—	—	—	—	—
2014–15	HC Lada Togliatti	KHL	51	11	9	20	24	—	—	—	—	—
2015–16	HC Lada Togliatti	KHL	41	1	1	2	22	—	—	—	—	—
2016–17	HC Lada Togliatti	KHL	28	5	4	9	10	—	—	—	—	—
2016–17	Dizel Penza	VHL	4	0	0	0	0	—	—	—	—	—
2017–18	HC Lada Togliatti	KHL	34	7	7	14	10	—	—	—	—	—
2018–19	Admiral Vladivostok	KHL	10	0	0	0	4	—	—	—	—	—
2018–19	HC Lada Togliatti	VHL	4	0	0	0	2	—	—	—	—	—
2018–19	Yugra Khanty-Mansiysk	VHL	23	6	3	9	6	—	—	—	—	—
2019–20	Humo Tashkent	VHL	50	16	8	24	24	8	1	1	2	2
2020–21	CSK VVS Samara	VHL	16	3	6	9	6	—	—	—	—	—
2021–22	SK Trhači Kadaň	Czech2	6	0	0	0	0	—	—	—	—	—
2021–22	Dizel Penza	VHL	17	1	4	5	8	—	—	—	—	—
KHL totals			368	46	42	88	154	6	0	0	0	2
VHL totals			128	29	24	53	64	10	1	1	2	4
