= Dario Trutmann =

Swiss ice hockey player

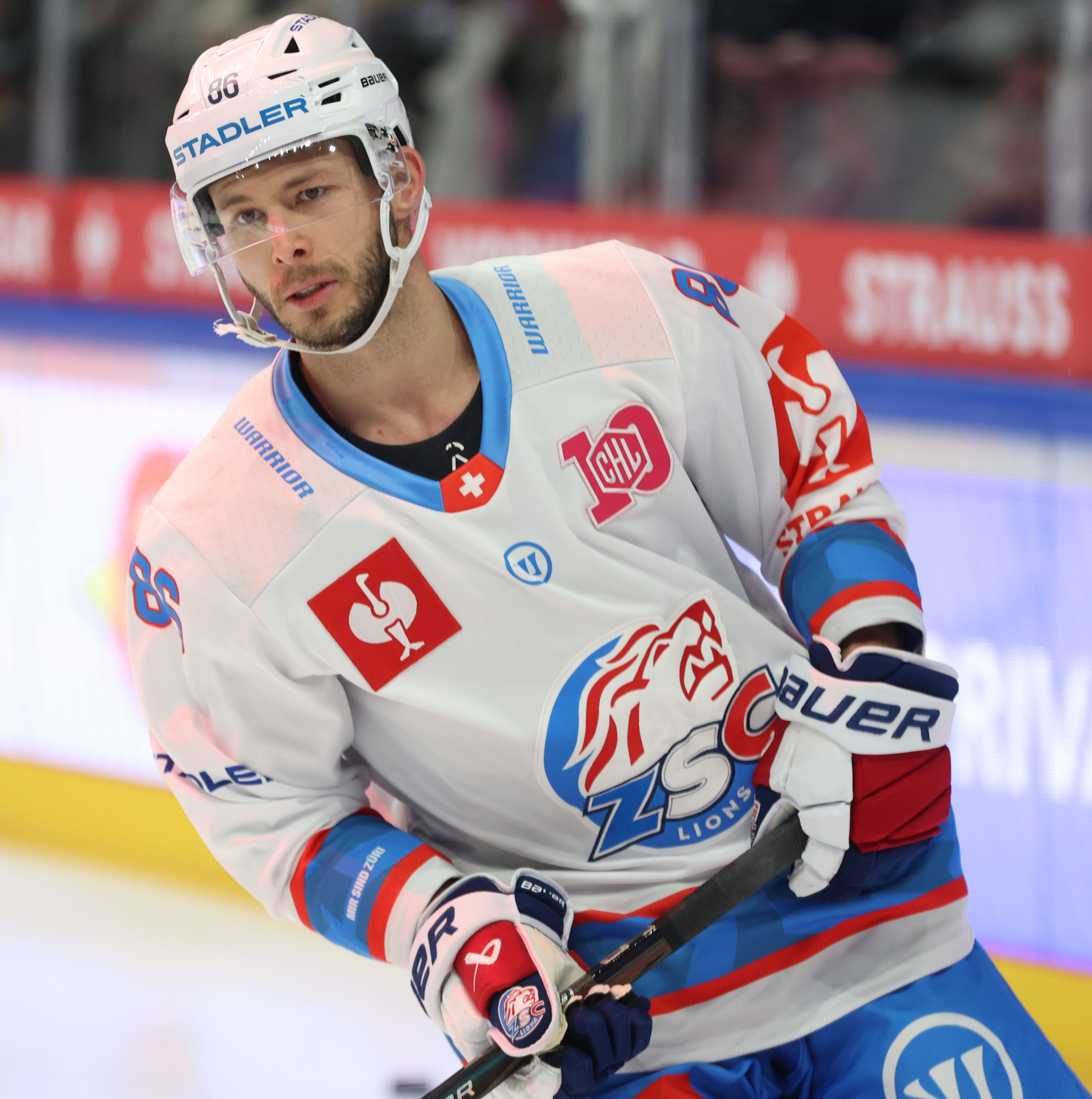
- Trutmann with ZSC Lions in 2024
- Born: September 17, 1992 (age 32); Zug, Switzerland
- Height: 6 ft 0 in (183 cm)
- Weight: 185 lb (84 kg; 13 st 3 lb)
- Position: Defence
- Shoots: Right
- NL team Former teams: ZSC Lions; EHC Biel; Genève-Servette HC; Lausanne HC
- NHL draft: Undrafted
- Playing career: 2010–present

Dario Trutmann (born September 17, 1992) is a Swiss professional ice hockey defenceman who is currently playing with the ZSC Lions of the National League (NL).

Trutmann made his National League A debut playing with EHC Biel during the 2012–13 NLA season. After four seasons with Lausanne HC Trutmann left the club as a free agent having earlier signed a two-year contract with his fourth NL club, ZSC Lions, on 16 January 2019. On February 17, 2021, Trutmann agreed to an early three-year contract extension with the Lions through to the end of the 2023/24 season.
