= David Tůma =

Czech ice hockey player

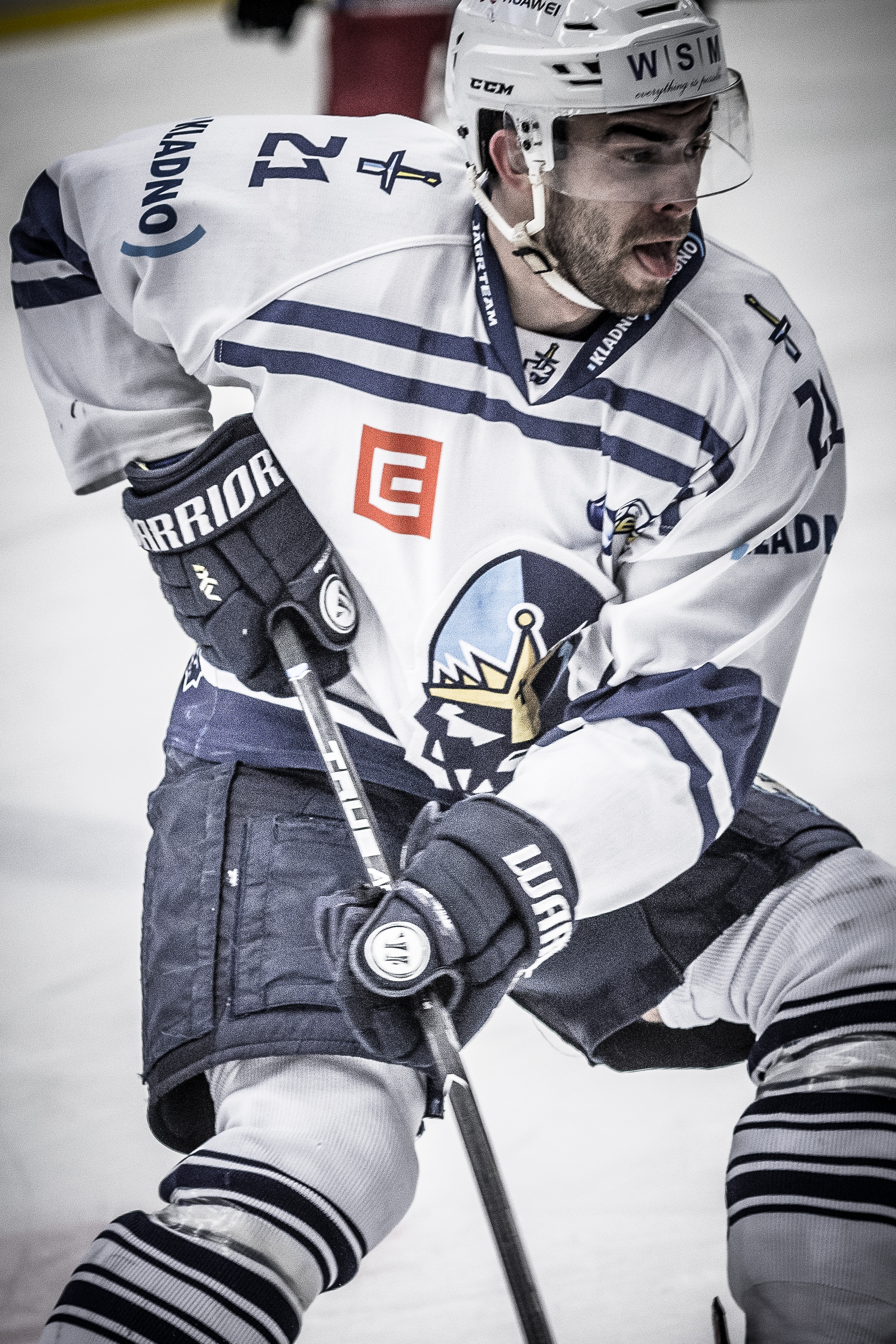
- Born: June 4, 1991 (age 33); Ústí nad Labem, Czechoslovakia
- Height: 6 ft 2 in (188 cm)
- Weight: 198 lb (90 kg; 14 st 2 lb)
- Position: Forward
- Shoots: Left
- Czech Extraliga team: HC Sparta Praha
- Playing career: 2010–present

David Tůma (born June 4, 1991) is a Czech professional ice hockey player. He played with HC Sparta Praha in the Czech Extraliga during the 2010–11 Czech Extraliga season.
