= Georgy Berdyukov =

Russian ice hockey player

- Born: August 19, 1991 (age 34) Khabarovsk, Russia
- Height: 6 ft 2 in (188 cm)
- Weight: 203 lb (92 kg; 14 st 7 lb)
- Position: Defence
- Shoots: Right
- KHL team (P) Cur. team Former teams: SKA Saint Petersburg; SKA-Neva (VHL); HC Vityaz; Amur Khabarovsk
- Playing career: 2009–present

Georgy Berdyukov (born August 19, 1991) is a Russian ice hockey defenceman. He is currently playing with SKA-Neva of the Supreme Hockey League (VHL) while under contract to SKA Saint Petersburg of the Kontinental Hockey League (KHL).

Berdyukov made his KHL debut playing with SKA Saint Petersburg during the 2010–11 KHL season.
