= Artem Voronin =

Russian ice hockey player

- Born: July 22, 1991 (age 34) Vidnoe, Russia
- Height: 6 ft 1 in (185 cm)
- Weight: 176 lb (80 kg; 12 st 8 lb)
- Position: Centre
- Shoots: Left
- KHL team Former teams: Free Agent; Spartak Moscow; Atlant Moscow Oblast
- Playing career: 2009–present

Artem Voronin (born July 22, 1991) is a Russian professional ice hockey forward. He is currently an unrestricted free agent. He first played with HC Spartak Moscow in the Kontinental Hockey League during the 2010–11 KHL season.
