= Filip Novotný =

Czech ice hockey player

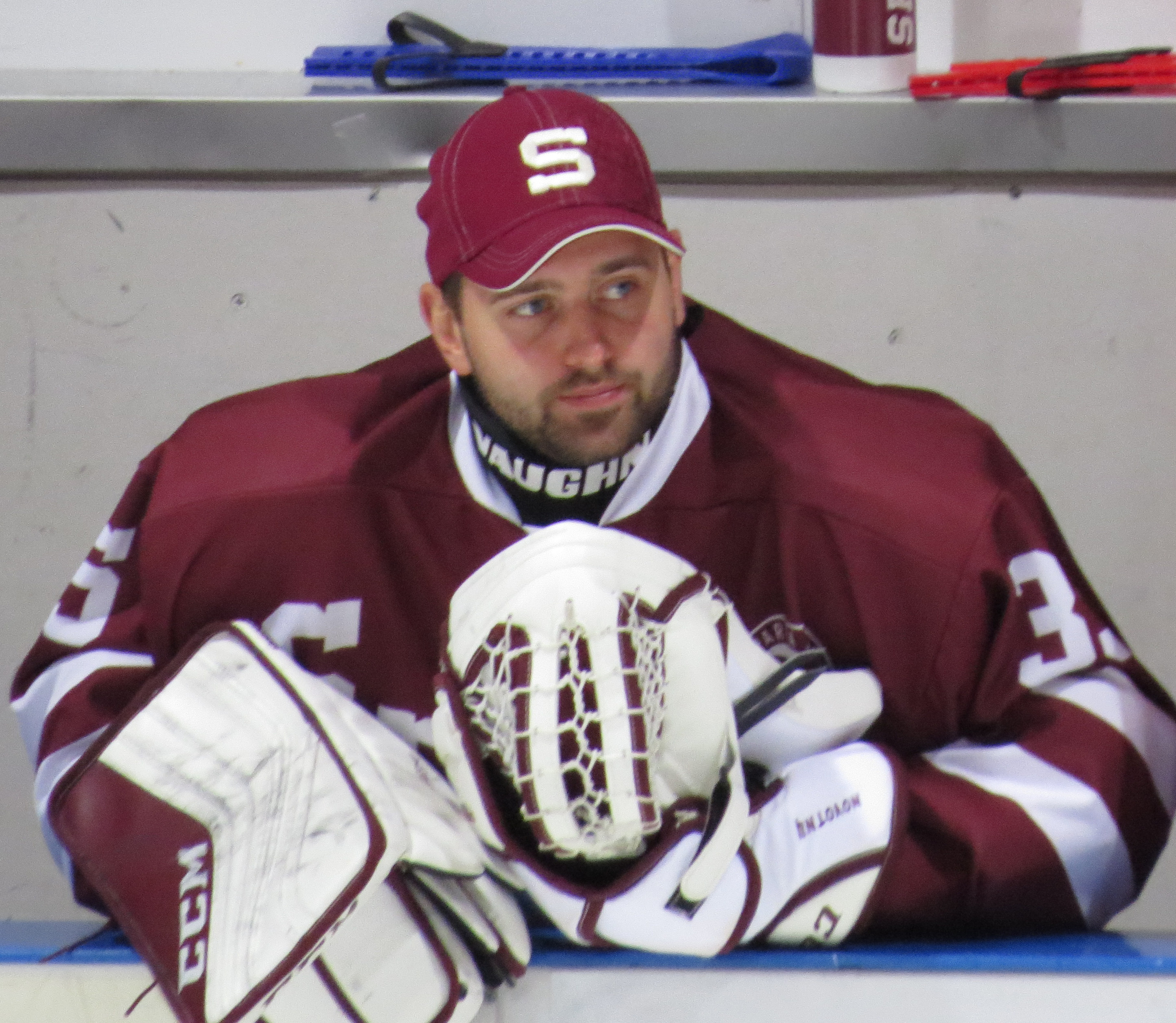
- Novotný with HC Sparta Praha in 2016
- Born: May 6, 1991 (age 33); Jihlava, Czechoslovakia
- Height: 6 ft 0 in (183 cm)
- Weight: 187 lb (85 kg; 13 st 5 lb)
- Position: Goaltender
- Catches: Right
- Czech team Former teams: HC Energie Karlovy Vary; Metallurg Novokuznetsk
- Playing career: 2011–present

Filip Novotný (born May 6, 1991) is a Czech professional ice hockey goaltender currently with HC Energie Karlovy Vary in the Czech Extraliga. He made his professional debut during the 2010–11 Czech Extraliga season.
