= Jakub Orsava =

Czech ice hockey player

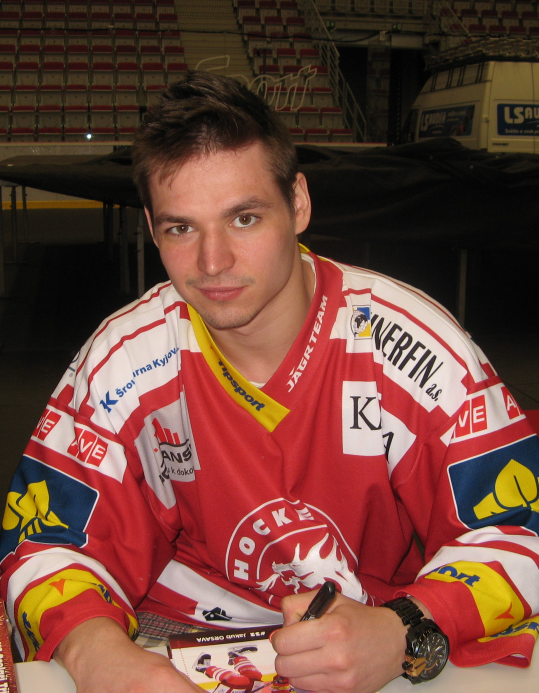
- Born: February 27, 1991 (age 34) Šumperk, Czechoslovakia
- Height: 6 ft 1 in (185 cm)
- Weight: 205 lb (93 kg; 14 st 9 lb)
- Position: Forward
- Shoots: Right
- ELH team Former teams: HC Kometa Brno; HC Oceláři Třinec; HC Dynamo Pardubice; BK Mladá Boleslav
- Playing career: 2010–present

Jakub Orsava (born February 27, 1991) is a Czech hockey player, who currently plays for HC Kometa Brno in the Czech Extraliga (ELH). He made his professional debut with HC Oceláři Třinec in the 2009–10 season.
