= Benjamin Huefner =

German ice hockey player

- Born: January 7, 1991 (age 34) Berlin, Germany
- Height: 5 ft 11 in (180 cm)
- Weight: 176 lb (80 kg; 12 st 8 lb)
- Position: Defence
- Shoots: Right
- DEL team: Eisbären Berlin
- NHL draft: Undrafted
- Playing career: 2010–present

Benjamin Huefner (born January 7, 1991) is a German professional ice hockey defenceman. He is currently playing for Eisbären Berlin in the Deutsche Eishockey Liga (DEL).
