= Teemu Tallberg =

Finnish ice hockey player

- Born: May 13, 1991 (age 33); Helsinki, Finland
- Height: 6 ft 1 in (185 cm)
- Weight: 198 lb (90 kg; 14 st 2 lb)
- Position: Forward
- Shoots: Left
- Liiga team Former teams: HIFK; Tappara; Vaasan Sport; Mikkelin Jukurit
- NHL draft: Undrafted
- Playing career: 2009–present

Teemu Tallberg (born May 13, 1991) is a Finnish professional ice hockey forward who currently plays for HIFK of the Liiga.
