= Dmitry Shikin =

Russian ice hockey player (born 1991)

- Born: August 28, 1991 (age 34) Khabarovsk, Russia
- Height: 6 ft 1 in (185 cm)
- Weight: 207 lb (94 kg; 14 st 11 lb)
- Position: Goaltender
- Shoots: Left
- KHL team Former teams: Shanghai Dragons; Atlant Moscow Oblast; SKA Saint Petersburg; Kunlun Red Star; Avtomobilist Yekaterinburg; EHC Biel; HC Vityaz
- Playing career: 2007–present

Dmitry Mikhailovich Shikin (Russian: Дмитрий Михайлович Шикин; born August 28, 1991) is a Russian professional ice hockey goaltender who plays for the Shanghai Dragons of the Kontinental Hockey League (KHL).

Shikin made his Kontinental Hockey League debut playing with SKA Saint Petersburg during the 2013–14 KHL season.
