= Jaakko Turtiainen =

Finnish ice hockey player

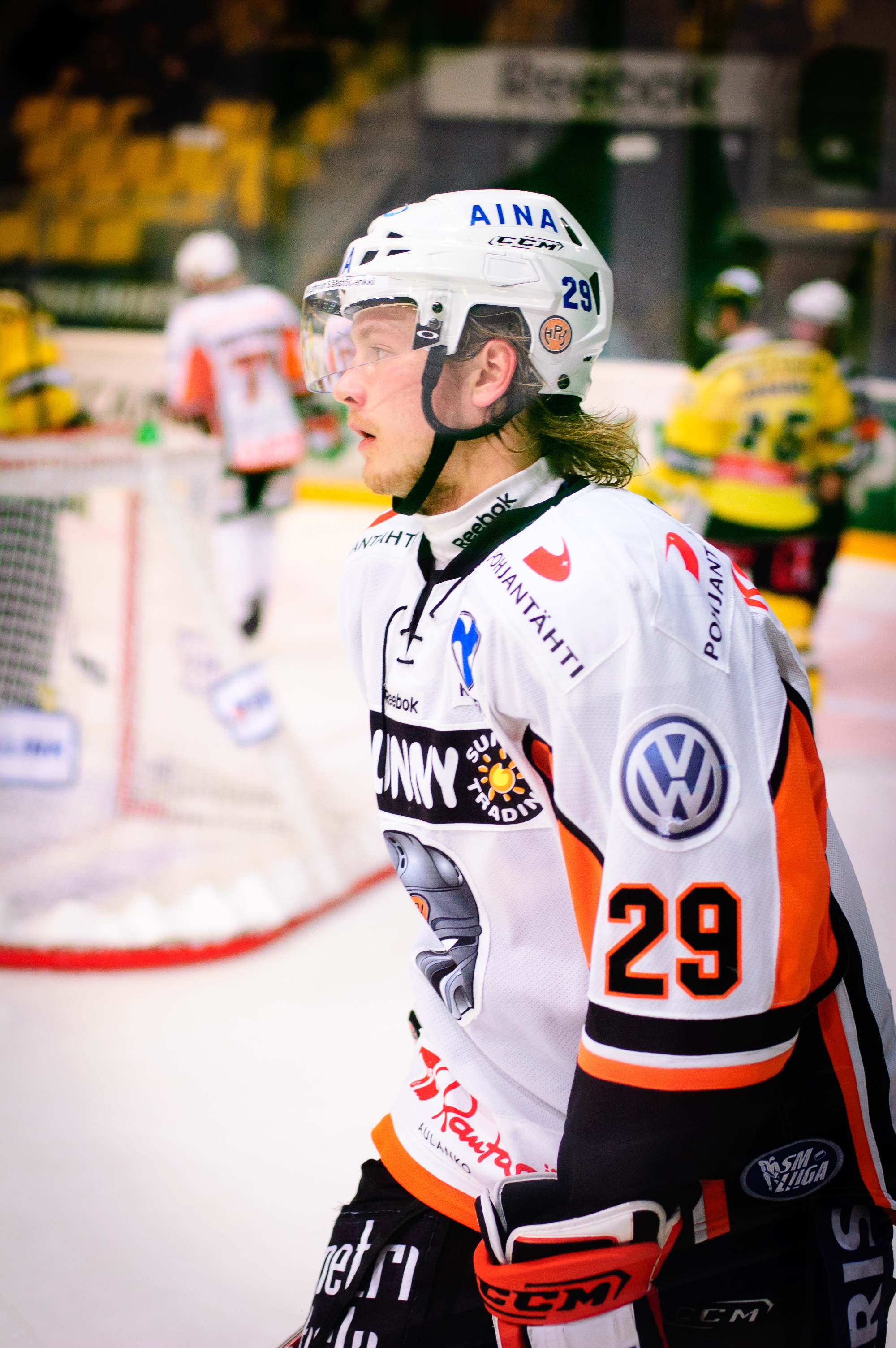
- Born: March 5, 1991 (age 34); Helsinki, Finland
- Height: 6 ft 0 in (183 cm)
- Weight: 192 lb (87 kg; 13 st 10 lb)
- Position: Forward
- Shot: Left
- Played for: HPK; Peliitat Heinola; SaPKo; Mikkelin Jukurit; Dunaújvárosi Acélbikák; KS Cracovia; KH GKS Katowice
- National team: Finland
- Playing career: 2010–2020

Jaakko Turtiainen
Medal record

Representing Finland

Ice hockey

IIHF World U18 Championships
Bronze medal – third place	2009 United States	

Jaakko Turtiainen (born March 5, 1991) is a Finnish professional ice hockey forward who currently plays for KS Cracovia of the Polska Hokej Liga.

Turtiainen previously played in Liiga for HPK.

== Career statistics ==
			Regular season					Playoffs
Season	Team	League	GP	G	A	Pts	PIM	GP	G	A	Pts	PIM
2005–06	HIFK U16	U16 SM-sarja Q	8	9	6	15	12	—	—	—	—	—
2005–06	HIFK U16	U16 SM-sarja	9	4	3	7	6	—	—	—	—	—
2006–07	HIFK U16	U16 SM-sarja Q	11	13	9	22	18	—	—	—	—	—
2006–07	HIFK U16	U16 SM-sarja	13	10	18	28	32	8	5	6	11	25
2006–07	HIFK U18	U18 SM-sarja	3	0	0	0	0	—	—	—	—	—
2007–08	HIFK U18	U18 SM-sarja	35	11	17	28	22	—	—	—	—	—
2008–09	HIFK U18	U18 SM-sarja	5	3	6	9	6	8	2	4	6	6
2008–09	HIFK U20	U20 SM-liiga	32	6	9	15	57	—	—	—	—	—
2009–10	HPK U20	U20 SM-liiga	25	6	7	13	79	4	1	2	3	6
2010–11	HPK U20	U20 SM-liiga	2	0	2	2	27	—	—	—	—	—
2010–11	HPK	SM-liiga	39	4	5	9	28	2	0	1	1	0
2010–11	Suomi U20	Mestis	3	0	0	0	0	—	—	—	—	—
2011–12	HPK U20	U20 SM-liiga	4	2	1	3	4	3	1	4	5	2
2011–12	HPK	SM-liiga	24	1	4	5	12	—	—	—	—	—
2011–12	Peliitat Heinola	Mestis	3	0	0	0	0	—	—	—	—	—
2012–13	HPK	SM-liiga	29	1	3	4	4	4	0	0	0	2
2012–13	Peliitat Heinola	Mestis	1	0	0	0	2	—	—	—	—	—
2013–14	HPK	Liiga	13	1	0	1	4	—	—	—	—	—
2013–14	SaPKo	Mestis	6	2	0	2	4	—	—	—	—	—
2013–14	Mikkelin Jukurit	Mestis	3	1	0	1	4	19	5	3	8	6
2014–15	Mikkelin Jukurit	Mestis	56	7	16	23	16	13	2	2	4	6
2015–16	Mikkelin Jukurit	Mestis	42	22	9	31	36	11	2	0	2	4
2016–17	HPK	Liiga	44	3	6	9	20	2	0	0	0	0
2017–18	HPK	Liiga	53	3	4	7	59	—	—	—	—	—
2018–19	Dunaújvárosi Acélbikák	Erste Liga	30	12	16	28	24	—	—	—	—	—
2018–19	Cracovia Krakow	Poland	10	3	3	6	4	13	1	3	4	6
2019–20	KH GKS Katowice	Poland	40	10	12	22	20	6	2	2	4	2
Liiga totals			202	13	22	35	127	8	0	1	1	2
Mestis totals			114	32	25	57	62	43	9	5	14	16
