= 2026–27 Champions Hockey League =

European ice hockey tournament

Tournament details
- Dates: 3 September 2026 – 23 February 2027
- Teams: 24

The 2026–27 Champions Hockey League is the 12th season of the Champions Hockey League, a European ice hockey tournament. 24 teams are competing in the tournament, with qualification being on sporting merits only.

== Team allocation ==
A total of 24 teams from different European first-tier leagues participate in the league. Besides the title holders, 18 teams from the six founding leagues, as well as the national champions from five yet-to-be-announced "challenge leagues" will participate.

The qualification criteria for national leagues is based on the following rules:

1. CHL champions
2. National league champions (play-off winners)
3. Regular season winners
4. Regular season runners-up
5. Regular season third-placed team

=== Teams ===
Team	City/Area	League	Qualification	Participation	Previous best
(Sweden) Frölunda HC	Gothenburg	Swedish Hockey League	2026 CHL winners	10th	Champion
(Sweden) Skellefteå AIK	Skellefteå	Swedish Hockey League	Play-off winners	10th	Final
(Sweden) Växjö Lakers	Växjö	Swedish Hockey League	Regular season third-place	9th	Final
(Sweden) Rögle BK	Ängelholm	Swedish Hockey League	Regular season fourth-place	3rd	Champion
(Switzerland) HC Fribourg-Gottéron	Fribourg	National League	Play-off winners	7th	Semi-finals
(Switzerland) HC Davos	Davos	National League	Regular season winners	5th	Semi-finals
(Switzerland) Genève-Servette HC	Geneva	National League	Regular season third-place	5th	Champion
(Finland) Tappara	Tampere	Liiga	Play-off winners	11th	Champion
(Finland) KooKoo	Kouvola	Liiga	Regular season runners-up	1st	—
(Finland) SaiPa	Lappeenranta	Liiga	Regular season third-place (Note: SaiPa qualified due to regular-season champions Tappara also winning the Liiga playoffs.)	3rd	Quarter-finals
(Czech Republic) Dynamo Pardubice	Pardubice	Czech Extraliga	Play-off winners	6th	Quarter-finals
(Czech Republic) HC Plzeň	Plzeň	Czech Extraliga	Regular season runners-up	4th	Semi-finals
(Czech Republic) Bílí Tygři Liberec	Liberec	Czech Extraliga	Regular season third-place (Note: Liberec qualified due to regular-season champion Pardubice also winning the Extraliga playoffs.)	6th	Semi-finals
(Germany) Eisbären Berlin	Berlin	Deutsche Eishockey Liga	Play-off winners	9th	Quarter-finals
(Germany) Kölner Haie	Cologne	Deutsche Eishockey Liga	Regular season winners	2nd	Group stage
(Germany) Adler Mannheim	Mannheim	Deutsche Eishockey Liga	Regular season runners-up	8th	Round of 16
(Austria) Graz 99ers	Graz	ICE Hockey League	Play-off winners	2nd	Group stage
(Austria) EC KAC	Klagenfurt	ICE Hockey League	Regular season runners-up	7th	Round of 16
(Austria) Red Bull Salzburg	Salzburg	ICE Hockey League	Regular season third-place	11th	Semi-finals
(Norway) Storhamar	Hamar	EliteHockey Ligaen	Play-off winners	5th	Round of 16
(France) Bordeaux Boxers	Bordeaux	Ligue Magnus	Play-off winners	1st	—
(Denmark) Herning Blue Fox	Herning	Metal Ligaen	Play-off winners	1st	—
(Poland) GKS Tychy	Tychy	Polska Hokej Liga	Play-off winners	4th	Group stage
(Slovakia) HK Nitra	Nitra	Slovak Extraliga	Play-off winners	3rd	Round of 32

== Round and draw dates ==
The schedule of the competition is as follows.

Phase	Round	Draw date	First leg	Second leg
Group stage	Matchday 1	27 May 2026	3–4 September 2026	
Group stage	Matchday 2	27 May 2026	5–6 September 2026	
Group stage	Matchday 3	27 May 2026	10–11 September 2026	
Group stage	Matchday 4	27 May 2026	12–13 September 2026	
Group stage	Matchday 5	27 May 2026	6–7 October 2026	
Group stage	Matchday 6	27 May 2026	13–14 October 2026	
Playoff	Round of 16	No draw	10–11 November 2026	17–18 November 2026
Playoff	Quarter-finals	No draw	1–2 December 2026	15 December 2026
Playoff	Semi-finals	No draw	12–13 January 2027	19–20 January 2027
Playoff	Final	No draw	23 February 2027	

== Regular season ==
Qualified teams in the 2026–27 Champions Hockey League.

In the regular season the 24 teams are combined into one table. Each team will play home and away against six different opponents once. The best sixteen teams will qualify to the round of 16.

The draw of the regular season took place on 21 May 2025 in Zurich, Switzerland.

=== Pots ===
Pot A	Pot B	Pot C	Pot D
(Sweden) Frölunda HC (Sweden) Skellefteå AIK (Switzerland) Fribourg-Gottéron (Finland) Tappara (Czech Republic) Dynamo Pardubice (Germany) Eisbären Berlin	(Austria) Graz 99ers (Sweden) Växjö Lakers (Switzerland) HC Davos (Finland) KooKoo (Czech Republic) Škoda Plzeň (Germany) Kölner Haie	(Austria) EC KAC (Sweden) Rögle BK (Switzerland) Genève-Servette (Finland) SaiPa (Czech Republic) Bílí Tygři Liberec (Germany) Adler Mannheim	(Austria) Red Bull Salzburg (France) Bordeaux Boxers (Norway) Storhamar (Denmark) Herning Blue Fox (Poland) GKS Tychy (Slovakia) HK Nitra

=== Grid ===
A1	(Sweden) Skellefteå AIK	A2	(Czech Republic) Dynamo Pardubice	A3	(Switzerland) Fribourg-Gottéron	A4	(Sweden) Frölunda HC	A5	(Germany) Eisbären Berlin	A6	(Finland) Tappara
B1	(Sweden) Växjö Lakers	B2	(Czech Republic) Škoda Plzeň	B3	(Finland) KooKoo	B4	(Austria) Graz 99ers	B5	(Germany) Kölner Haie	B6	(Switzerland) HC Davos
C1	(Sweden) Rögle BK	C2	(Germany) Adler Mannheim	C3	(Finland) SaiPa	C4	(Austria) EC KAC	C5	(Czech Republic) Bílí Tygři Liberec	C6	(Switzerland) Genève-Servette
D1	(Poland) GKS Tychy	D2	(Slovakia) HK Nitra	D3	(France) Bordeaux Boxers	D4	(Denmark) Herning Blue Fox	D5	(Norway) Storhamar	D6	(Austria) Red Bull Salzburg

=== League table ===
Pos	Team	Pld	W	OTW	OTL	L	GF	GA	GD	Pts	Qualification
1	(Czech Republic) Škoda Plzeň	6	6	0	0	0	30	12	+18	18	Qualification to playoffs
2	(Sweden) Skellefteå AIK	6	5	0	0	1	24	12	+12	15	Qualification to playoffs
3	(Germany) Kölner Haie	6	4	1	1	0	24	13	+11	15	Qualification to playoffs
4	(Czech Republic) Dynamo Pardubice	6	4	1	0	1	22	9	+13	14	Qualification to playoffs
5	(Germany) Eisbären Berlin	6	4	0	0	2	16	20	−4	12	Qualification to playoffs
6	(Sweden) Frölunda HC	6	3	1	1	1	28	14	+14	12	Qualification to playoffs
7	(Switzerland) Genève-Servette	6	3	1	0	2	16	14	+2	11	Qualification to playoffs
8	(Germany) Adler Mannheim	6	3	1	0	2	20	20	0	11	Qualification to playoffs
9	(Finland) Tappara	6	3	0	2	1	19	18	+1	11	Qualification to playoffs
10	(Switzerland) Fribourg-Gottéron	6	3	0	1	2	21	16	+5	10	Qualification to playoffs
11	(Sweden) Växjö Lakers	6	3	0	1	2	16	11	+5	10	Qualification to playoffs
12	(Finland) KooKoo	6	3	0	1	2	20	19	+1	10	Qualification to playoffs
13	(Finland) SaiPa	6	3	0	1	2	19	20	−1	10	Qualification to playoffs
14	(Czech Republic) Bílí Tygři Liberec	6	2	2	0	2	16	14	+2	10	Qualification to playoffs
15	(Sweden) Rögle BK	6	3	0	0	3	13	12	+1	9	Qualification to playoffs
16	(Switzerland) HC Davos	6	2	1	0	3	19	17	+2	8	Qualification to playoffs
17	(Slovakia) HK Nitra	6	2	1	0	3	15	19	−4	8	
18	(Norway) Storhamar	6	1	1	1	3	14	19	−5	6	
19	(France) Bordeaux Boxers	6	1	0	1	4	16	35	−19	4	
20	(Austria) Graz 99ers	6	1	0	0	5	14	24	−10	3	
21	(Austria) Red Bull Salzburg	6	1	0	0	5	13	24	−11	3	
22	(Denmark) Herning Blue Fox	6	0	1	1	4	10	22	−12	3	
23	(Austria) EC KAC	6	0	1	0	5	9	16	−7	2	
24	(Poland) GKS Tychy	6	0	0	1	5	10	24	−14	1	

Source: Champions Hockey League

=== Regular season tie-breaking criteria ===
Teams are ranked according to points (3 points for a win in regulation time, 2 points for a win in overtime, 1 point for a loss in overtime, 0 points for a loss in regulation time). If two or more teams were tied on points, the following tiebreaking criteria is applied, in the order given, to determine the rankings (see 8.4.4. Tie breaking formula group stage standings):

1. Greater number of wins in regulation time (3 point wins);
2. Greater number of wins in total (regulation time wins + overtime and shootout wins);
3. Better goal difference;
4. More goals scored;
5. More away goals scored;
6. The higher position in the CHL Draw pot allocation.

=== Results ===
Home \ Away	MAN	LIB	BOR	DAV	PAR	BER	FRI	FRÖ	GEN	GRA	HER	NIT	KLA	KÖL	KOO	SAL	RÖG	SAI	SKE	PLZ	STO	TAP	TYC	VÄX
Adler Mannheim																			1–3				5–4	3–1
Bílí Tygři Liberec								3–2		6–2	2–1													
Bordeaux Boxers	4–5				2–5															4–10				
HC Davos		0–2				8–2															3–2			
Dynamo Pardubice																	1–0						6–0	2–1
Eisbären Berlin										4–1	2–1		2–1											
Fribourg-Gottéron	3–4											6–1								2–4				
Frölunda HC			11–1												2–1			6–1						
Genève-Servette						6–2								4–3							3–2			
Graz 99ers			2–4				2–4											1–3						
Herning Blue Fox							4–3								2–5			2–7						
HK Nitra																	5–1		1–6					1–3
EC KAC			2–1				1–3								3–5									
Kölner Haie								5–2			3–0		3–1											
KooKoo	5–2				3–6							1–4												
Red Bull Salzburg		3–0				3–4								2–5										
Rögle BK				3–2												5–0						4–0		
SaiPa					3–2							2–3								3–6				
Skellefteå AIK				6–2					3–2							4–2								
Škoda Plzeň																	4–0		4–2				2–1	
Storhamar								3–5		3–6			2–1											
Tappara		6–3												4–5							1–2			
GKS Tychy				2–4					0–1													3–6		
Växjö Lakers									4–0							6–3						1–2		

Source: Champions Hockey League
Legend: Blue = home team win; Red = away team win.
Matches with lighter background shading were decided after overtime.

== Playoffs ==
=== Format ===
In the playoffs, pairings were formed based on the positions of the teams in the regular season as follows: the team finished 1st in the regular season faced the team finished 16th, the team finished 2nd faced the team finished 15th, and so on. There will be no play-off draw or any reseedings for the quarter-finals and semi-finals. In each round except the final, the teams play two games and the aggregate score decides which team advances. The first leg is hosted by the team with the lower seed with the second leg being played on the home ice of the other team. If aggregate score is tied, a sudden death overtime follows. If the overtime is scoreless, the team who wins the shoot out competition advances.

The final will be played on the home ice of the team with the higher accumulative ranking across the entire campaign, including play-off games.

=== Bracket ===
Round of 16
16	(Switzerland) HC Davos (OT)	5	2	7
1	(Czech Republic) Škoda Plzeň	4	2	6
8	(Germany) Adler Mannheim	4	2	6
9	(Finland) Tappara	2	2	4
13	(Finland) SaiPa	2	2	4
4	(Czech Republic) Dynamo Pardubice	3	5	8
12	(Finland) KooKoo	3	2	5
5	(Germany) Eisbären Berlin	5	9	14
11	(Sweden) Växjö Lakers	3	3	6
6	(Sweden) Frölunda HC (OT)	4	3	7
3	(Germany) Kölner Haie	4	4	8
14	(Czech Republic) Bílí Tygři Liberec	2	3	5
7	(Switzerland) Genève-Servette	1	3	4
10	(Switzerland) Fribourg-Gottéron	6	3	9
15	(Sweden) Rögle BK	2	2	4
2	(Sweden) Skellefteå AIK	2	3	5

Quarter-finals
16	(Switzerland) HC Davos
8	(Germany) Adler Mannheim
4	(Czech Republic) Dynamo Pardubice
5	(Germany) Eisbären Berlin
6	(Sweden) Frölunda HC
3	(Germany) Kölner Haie
10	(Switzerland) Fribourg-Gottéron
2	(Sweden) Skellefteå AIK

Semi-finals

Final

=== Round of 16 ===
The first legs were played on 10 and 11 November with return legs played on 17 and 18 November 2026.

Team 1	Agg.	Team 2	1st leg	2nd leg
HC Davos (OT) (Switzerland)	7–6	(Czech Republic) Škoda Plzeň	5–4	2–2
Rögle BK (Sweden)	4–5	(Sweden) Skellefteå AIK	2–2	2–3
Kölner Haie (Germany)	8–5	(Czech Republic) Bílí Tygři Liberec	4–2	4–3
SaiPa (Finland)	4–8	(Czech Republic) Dynamo Pardubice	2–3	2–5
KooKoo (Finland)	5–14	(Germany) Eisbären Berlin	3–5	2–9
Växjö Lakers (Sweden)	6–7	(Sweden) Frölunda HC (OT)	3–4	3–3
Genève-Servette (Switzerland)	4–9	(Switzerland) Fribourg-Gottéron	1–6	3–3
Adler Mannheim (Germany)	6–4	(Finland) Tappara	4–2	2–2

The first game took place at the venue of the higher-seeded team, rather than at the venue of the lower-seeded team, as the rules required.

==== (1) Škoda Plzeň vs. (16) HC Davos ====
10 November 2026; 19:45 CET	HC Davos (Switzerland)	5–4 (2–0, 1–3, 2–1)	(Czech Republic) Škoda Plzeň	VAT Arena, Davos; Attendance: 1,611

Game reference

Luca Hollenstein
Goalies
Nick Malík
Referees:
Riku Brander
Marius Wölzmüller
Linesmen:
Dominik Schlegel
Michał Żak

Tambellini (Frick, Jäger) (PP) – 7:29	1–0
Allard (Zadina, Frick) – 8:10	2–0
Corvi (Zadina) – 20:39	3–0
	3–1	26:20 – (PP) Růžička (Simon, Rubīns)
	3–2	38:40 – (PP) Robertson
	3–3	39:59 – (PP) Petman (Rohlík, Jeřábek)
Jäger (Asplund, Blandisi) (PP) – 49:24	4–3
	4–4	54:42 – Merezhko (Strnad)
Zadina (Corvi) (PP) – 56:28	5–4

35 min
Penalties
16 min
25
Shots
25

17 November 2026; 17:30 CET	Škoda Plzeň (Czech Republic)	2–2 (OT) (0–0, 2–1, 0–0) (OT 0–1)	(Switzerland) HC Davos	Logspeed CZ Arena, Plzeň; Attendance: 5,028

Game reference

Nick Malík
Goalies
Luca Hollenstein
Referees:
David Cespiva
Andreas Huber
Linesmen:
Jiří Ondráček
Petr Šimánek

Merezhko (Měchura, Strnad) (PP) – 24:50	1–0
	1–1	34:02 – Lemieux (Blandisi, Allard)
Petman (Jeřábek, Teplý) – 36:08	2–1
	2–2	64:53 – Blandisi (Frehner, Andersson)

2 min
Penalties
2 min
62
Shots
42

HC Davos won 7–6 on aggregate.

==== (2) Skellefteå AIK vs. (15) Rögle BK ====
10 November 2026; 19:00 CET	Rögle BK (Sweden)	2–2 (1–1, 0–0, 1–1)	(Sweden) Skellefteå AIK	Catena Arena, Angelholm; Attendance: 3,469

Game reference

Calle Clang
Goalies
Jani Lampinen
Referees:
Mikael Holm
Alexander Kaptain
Linesmen:
Ludvig Lundgren
Rasmus Strömberg

Kuhlman (Friedman) – 3:09	1–0
	1–1	6:23 – Nordlund (Fasching, Lindberg)
	1–2	43:24 – Johnsson (Djuse)
Horký (Everberg) – 48:22	2–2

12 min
Penalties
16 min
58
Shots
45

17 November 2026; 19:00 CET	Skellefteå AIK (Sweden)	3–2 (0–1, 2–1, 1–0)	(Sweden) Rögle BK	Skellefteå Kraft Arena, Skellefteå; Attendance: 2,222

Game reference

Jani Lampinen
Goalies
Calle Clang
Referees:
Tobias Björk
Anssi Salonen
Linesmen:
Teodor Sörholm
Christian Billing

	0–1	9:16 – Kuhlman (Kellman, Själin)
Johnsson (O. Lindberg, Hugg) (PP) – 21:23	1–1
Vuollet (V. Lindberg) – 23:03	2–1
	2–2	22:26 – Sundsvik (Everberg) (SH)
Johansson (Hugg, Aagaard Hansen) – 50:30	3–2

6 min
Penalties
6 min
54
Shots
36

Skellefteå AIK won 5–4 on aggregate.

==== (3) Kölner Haie vs. (14) Bílí Tygři Liberec ====
11 November 2026; 19:30 CET	Kölner Haie (Germany)	4–2 (1–1, 2–1, 1–0)	(Czech Republic) Bílí Tygři Liberec	Lanxess Arena, Cologne; Attendance: 11,812

Game reference

Janne Juvonen
Goalies
Petr Hamalčík
Referees:
Mikko Kaukokari
Geoffrey Barcelo
Linesmen:
Dr. Kai Jürgens
Vincent Brüggemann

Bokk (Press) – 6:50	1–0
	1–1	12:26 – Musil (Pytlík)
	1–2	28:00 – Najman
MacInnis (SHG) – 33:18	2–2
Ljungh (Press, Aubry) – 33:33	3–2
Fleischer (Kemiläinen, MacInnis) – 52:27	4–2

6 min
Penalties
6 min
32
Shots
27

17 November 2026; 15:00 CET	Bílí Tygři Liberec (Czech Republic)	3–4 (1–3, 2–0, 0–1)	(Germany) Kölner Haie	Home Credit Arena, Liberec; Attendance: 3,641

Game reference

Petr Kváča
Goalies
Janne Juvonen
Referees:
Joonas Kova
Kristian Vikman
Linesmen:
Jiří Svoboda
David Thuma

Vlach (Filippi) – 1:21	1–0
	1–1	6:45 – (PP) Press (Ljungh, Bokk)
	1–2	13:36 – Tyrväinen (MacLeod, Russell)
	1–3	19:02 – Russell (Kemiläinen, MacLeod)
Lenc (Musil) – 26:26	2–3
Najman – 37:59	3–3
	3–4	40:25 – MacLeod (Tyrväinen)

6 min
Penalties
2 min
31
Shots
27

Kölner Haie won 8–5 on aggregate.

==== (4) Dynamo Pardubice vs. (13) SaiPa ====
11 November 2026; 17:30 CET	SaiPa (Finland)	2–3 (2–1, 0–1, 0–1)	(Czech Republic) Dynamo Pardubice	Kisapuisto, Lappeenranta; Attendance: 2,446

Game reference

Kari Piiroinen
Goalies
Roman Will
Referees:
Mikael Sjöqvist
Loïc Ruprecht
Linesmen:
Niko Jusi
Oskari Saarimäki

	0–1	6:46 – (PP) Nosek (Kondelík, Čerešňák)
Salomäki (Zabaneh) – 8:54	1–1
Heikkilä (Emanuelsson, Hokkanen) – 10:33	2–1
	2–2	28:51 – Stránský
	2–3	44:05 – Tourigny (Ludvig)

33 min
Penalties
35 min
31
Shots
31

18 November 2026; 18:00 CET	Dynamo Pardubice (Czech Republic)	5–2 (0–2, 5–0, 0–0)	(Finland) SaiPa	Enteria arena, Pardubice; Attendance: 7,352

Game reference

Roman Will
Goalies
Gustavs Dāvis Grigals pulled out at 40:00
Kari Piiroinen
Referees:
Marian Rohatsch
Lukas Kohlmüller
Linesmen:
Stanislav Hnát
Daniel Hynek

	0–1	11:19 – Peski (Perttu)
	0–2	17:22 – Žeželj (Salminen, Tauslahti)
Kaut – 22:50	1–2
Ludvig (Sobotka, Tourigny) – 23:56	2–2
Stránský (Tomášek, Nosek) (PP) – 37:38	3–2
Smejkal (Sobotka, Košťálek) (PP) – 38:46	4–2
Nosek (Kelemen, Poulíček) – 39:23	5–2

4 min
Penalties
6 min
57
Shots
46

Dynamo Pardubice won 8–4 on aggregate.

==== (5) Eisbären Berlin vs. (12) KooKoo ====
10 November 2026; 17:30 CET	KooKoo (Finland)	3–5 (1–0, 1–3, 1–2)	(Germany) Eisbären Berlin	Kouvolan jäähalli, Kouvola; Attendance: 2,048

Game reference

Jasper Patrikainen
Goalies
Jack LaFontaine
Referees:
Roland Gerber
Daniel Pražák
Linesmen:
Tommi Niittylä
Joni Pekkala

Holmström (Rooba, Pakaslahti) – 13:57	1–0
Gröndahl (Jaakola, Galló) – 22:11	2–0
	2–1	22:57 – Kirk (Fontaine, Müller)
	2–2	28:10 – Kirk (Wissmann, Fontaine)
	2–3	31:57 – Smith (Ronning, Fontaine)
	2–4	46:13 – Veilleux (Wissmann, Müller)
Rooba (Holmström, Nousianen) – 54:56	3–4
	3–5	56:28 – Vikingstad (Veilleux)

2 min
Penalties
6 min
26
Shots
38

18 November 2026; 19:30 CET	Eisbären Berlin (Germany)	9–2 (1–1, 5–1, 3–0)	(Finland) KooKoo	Wellblechpalast, Lichtenberg; Attendance: 3,240

Game reference

Jack LaFontaine
Goalies
Jasper Patrikainen
Referees:
Lukáš Květoň
Jiří Ondráček
Linesmen:
Kenneth Englisch
Maksim Cepik

	0–1	8:51 – Siikonen (Riekkinen, Gröndahl)
Geibel (Tiffels) – 9:32	1–1
Kirk (Ronning) – 21:35	2–1
	2–2	26:06 – Puhakka
Smith (Vikingstad) – 30:32	3–2
Krestan (Hördler, Reinke) – 31:43	4–2
Veilleux – 39:34	5–2
Krestan – 39:58	6–2
Kirk – 44:18	7–2
Veilleux – 39:58	8–2
Wissmann (Ronning, Kirk) (PP) – 49:55	9–2

8 min
Penalties
8 min
71
Shots
39

Eisbären Berlin won 14–5 on aggregate.

==== (6) Frölunda HC vs. (11) Växjö Lakers ====
10 November 2026; 19:00 CET	Växjö Lakers (Sweden)	3–4 (2–1, 1–1, 0–2)	(Sweden) Frölunda HC	Vida Arena, Växjö; Attendance: 2,363

Game reference

Ludvig Persson until 52:28 Pulled for Adam Åhman
Goalies
Lars Johansson
Referees:
Christoffer Holm
Henri Neva
Linesmen:
Andréas Svensson
Anders Nyqvist

	0–1	3:42 – Dower Nilsson (Fagemo, Hasa)
Suomi (Lowe, Strandberg) – 5:45	1–1
Kratz (Nilsson, Anderberg) – 16:51	2–1
Henriksson (Persson, Cooper) – 24:05	3–1
	3–2	30:32 – Meijer
	3–3	41:15 – Clarke (Högberg, Cederqvist)
	3–4	56:06 – Milošević (Johannesson, Dower Nilsson)

6 min
Penalties
6 min
25
Shots
28

17 November 2026; 19:00 CET	Frölunda HC (Sweden)	3–3 (OT) (1–1, 0–0, 1–2) (OT 1–0)	(Sweden) Växjö Lakers	Frölundaborg, Gothenburg; Attendance: 2,425

Game reference

Tobias Normann
Goalies
Adam Åhman
Referees:
Linus Öhlund
André Schrader
Linesmen:
Gustav Jonsson
Ludvig Lundgren

	0–1	7:14 – Nadeau (Elvenes, Palme)
Westergård (Friberg, Lasu) – 7:25	1–1
Puistola (Peterson, Fagemo) – 36:08	2–1
	2–2	56:07 – E. Suomi (Mäntykivi, J. Suomi) (PP)
	2–3	57:04 – Nadeau (Rasmussen, Persson)
Fagemo (Puistola, Tömmernes) (PP) – 61:57	3–3

4 min
Penalties
10 min
56
Shots
38

Frölunda HC won 7–6 on aggregate.

==== (7) Genève-Servette vs. (10) Fribourg-Gottéron ====
11 November 2026; 19:45 CET	Genève-Servette (Switzerland)	1–6 (0–2, 1–2, 0–2)	(Switzerland) HC Fribourg-Gottéron	Patinoire des Vernets, Geneva; Attendance: 5,449

Game reference

Joren van Pottelberghe
Goalies
Ludovic Waeber
Referees:
Phillip Ströbel
Tomáš Mejzlík
Linesmen:
Aurélien Urfer
Michael Stalder

	0–1	10:35 – (PP) Johnson (Sörensen, Borgström)
	0–2	17:08 – Sörensen (Reber, Jecker)
	0–3	23:22 – Kapla (Sörensen, Rathgeb)
	0–4	32:25 – Nicolet (Hedlund, Johnson)
Verboon (Puljujärvi, Le Coultre (PP) – 35:53	1–4
	1–5	47:44 – (SHG) Schmid (Bertschy)
	1–6	54:26 – Nicolet (Hedlund, Dorthe)

33 min
Penalties
33 min
23
Shots
34

18 November 2026; 19:45 CET	HC Fribourg-Gottéron (Switzerland)	3–3 (0–1, 1–1, 2–0)	(Switzerland) Genève-Servette	BCF Arena, Fribourg; Attendance: 7,007

Game reference

Loïc Galley
Goalies
Joren van Pottelberghe
Referees:
Sean MacFarlane
Kilian Hinterdobler
Linesmen:
Michael Stalder
Fabrizio Bachelut

	0–1	2:37 – Vesey (Ignatavičius, Manninen)
Johnson (Borgström, Seiler) – 35:05	1–1
	1–2	35:55 – Ignatavičius
	1–3	54:06 – Puljujärvi (Untersander, Chanton)
Bertschy (Schmid, Seiler) – 59:23	2–3
Rathgeb (Schild, Rogl) – 59:46	3–3

4 min
Penalties
4 min
39
Shots
65

Fribourg-Gottéron won 9–4 on aggregate.

==== (8) Tappara vs. (9) Adler Mannheim ====
10 November 2026; 19:30 CET	Adler Mannheim (Germany)	4–2 (1–0, 2–0, 1–2)	(Finland) Tappara	SAP Arena, Mannheim; Attendance: 3,812

Game reference

Jake Hildebrand
Goalies
Juha Metsola
Referees:
Christian Ofner
Christoph Sternat
Linesmen:
Patrick Laguzov
Jonas Reinold

Kühnhackl (Ehl, Reichel) – 5:53	1–0
Solow (Esposito) – 28:38	2–0
Kälble (Kühnhackl, Greco) – 36:41	3–0
	3–1	44:21 – Fabre (Mattila, Haapala)
	3–2	44:48 – Mattila (Jokipakka)
Reichel – 52:05	4–2

4 min
Penalties
2 min
31
Shots
27

17 November 2026; 17:30 CET (18:30 EET)	Tappara (Finland)	2–2 (2–1, 0–1, 0–0)	(Germany) Adler Mannheim	Nokia Arena, Tampere; Attendance: 3,271

Game reference

Juha Metsola
Goalies
Jake Hildebrand
Referees:
Manuel Nikolic
Adam Kika
Linesmen:
Valtteri Niiranen
Lauri Nikulainen

Pavel – 6:23	1–0
	1–1	11:52 – Mattinen (Solow, Michaelis)
Suvanto (Simontaival, Tuulola) – 14:15	2–1
	2–2	32:45 – Plachta (Renouf, Solow)

2 min
Penalties
31 min
56
Shots
43

Adler Mannheim won 6–4 on aggregate.

=== Quarter-finals ===
The first legs will be played on 1 and 2 December with return legs played on 15 December 2026.

Team 1	Agg.	Team 2	1st leg	2nd leg
Adler Mannheim (Germany)	1	(Switzerland) HC Davos	1 Dec	15 Dec
Fribourg-Gottéron (Switzerland)	2	(Sweden) Skellefteå AIK	1 Dec	15 Dec
Frölunda HC (Sweden)	3	(Germany) Kölner Haie	1 Dec	15 Dec
Eisbären Berlin (Germany)	4	(Czech Republic) Dynamo Pardubice	2 Dec	15 Dec

The first game will take place at the venue of the higher-seeded team, rather than at the venue of the lower-seeded team, as the rules required.

==== (8) Adler Mannheim vs. (16) HC Davos ====
1 December 2026; 19:30 CET	Adler Mannheim (Germany)	v	(Switzerland) HC Davos	SAP Arena, Mannheim

15 December 2026; 19:45 CET	HC Davos (Switzerland)	v	(Germany) Adler Mannheim	VAT Arena, Davos

==== (2) Skellefteå AIK vs. (10) Fribourg-Gottéron ====
1 December 2026; 19:45 CET	HC Fribourg-Gottéron (Switzerland)	v	(Sweden) Skellefteå AIK	BCF Arena, Fribourg

15 December 2026; 19:00 CET	Skellefteå AIK (Sweden)	v	(Switzerland) HC Fribourg-Gottéron	Skellefteå Kraft Arena, Skellefteå

==== (3) Kölner Haie vs. (6) Frölunda HC ====
1 December 2026; 19:00 CET	Frölunda HC (Sweden)	v	(Germany) Kölner Haie	Frölundaborg, Gothenburg

15 December 2026; 19:30 CET	Kölner Haie (Germany)	v	(Sweden) Frölunda HC	Lanxess Arena, Cologne

==== (4) Dynamo Pardubice vs. (5) Eisbären Berlin ====
2 December 2026; 19:00 CET	Eisbären Berlin (Germany)	v	(Czech Republic) Dynamo Pardubice	Wellblechpalast, Lichtenberg

15 December 2026; 19:00 CET	Dynamo Pardubice (Czech Republic)	v	(Germany) Eisbären Berlin	Enteria arena, Pardubice

=== Semi-finals ===
The first legs will be played on 12 and 13 January with return legs played on 19 and 20 January 2027.

Team 1	Agg.	Team 2	1st leg	2nd leg
Winner quarter-final 1 or winner quarter-final 4	1	Winner quarter-final 1 or winner quarter-final 4	12–13 Jan	19–20 Jan
Winner quarter-final 2 or winner quarter-final 3	2	Winner quarter-final 2 or winner quarter-final 3	12–13 Jan	19–20 Jan

=== Final ===
23 February 2027; TBA	Winner semi-final 1 or winner semi-final 2	v	Winner semi-final 1 or winner semi-final 2	TBA

== Statistics ==
=== Scoring leaders ===
The following players lead the league in points.

Player	Team	GP	G	A	PTS	PIM	+/–	GWG	PPG	SHG	SOG	S%
(Denmark) Patrick Russell	(Germany) Kölner Haie	7	8	5	13	6	+7	2	3	0	19	42.11%
(Canada) Gregor MacLeod	(Germany) Kölner Haie	7	2	11	13	4	+5	2	0	0	24	8.33%
(Germany) Marcel Noebels	(Germany) Kölner Haie	8	7	5	12	2	+5	1	2	0	14	50.00%
(United Kingdom) Liam Kirk	(Germany) Eisbären Berlin	7	6	6	12	0	+7	0	0	0	20	30.00%
(Czech Republic) Filip Zadina	(Switzerland) HC Davos	6	5	6	11	2	+7	2	3	0	14	35.71%
(Sweden) Filip Cederqvist	(Sweden) Frölunda HC	8	3	7	10	0	+3	0	1	0	21	14.29%
(Canada) Nicolas Mattinen	(Germany) Adler Mannheim	8	6	3	9	6	+5	1	0	0	32	18.75%
(Finland) Aapeli Räsänen	(Finland) Tappara	6	5	4	9	6	+2	1	3	0	9	55.56%
(Sweden) Andreas Johnsson	(Sweden) Skellefteå AIK	7	5	4	9	2	+3	1	3	0	11	45.45%
(Sweden) Samuel Fagemo	(Sweden) Frölunda HC	8	5	4	9	2	+4	1	3	0	31	16.13%

=== Leading goaltenders ===
The following goaltenders lead the league in save percentage, provided that they have played at least 40% of their team's minutes.

Player	Team	GP	W	L	SV	GA	SV%	GAA	SO	MIN
(Czech Republic) Roman Will	(Czech Republic) Dynamo Pardubice	5	5	0	137	8	94.48%	1.58	1	304
(Switzerland) Loïc Galley	(Switzerland) Fribourg-Gottéron	4	1	2	123	11	91.79%	2.70	0	244
(Sweden) Calle Clang	(Sweden) Rögle BK	6	2	3	133	12	91.72%	2.24	0	321
(Sweden) Lars Johansson	(Sweden) Frölunda HC	4	4	0	84	8	91.30%	1.99	0	241
(Finland) Jani Lampinen	(Sweden) Skellefteå AIK	6	4	1	125	12	91.24%	2.01	0	359

=== Home Game and Overall ===
As of 18 November 2026

Pos.	Team	Regular season		Playoffs		Overall			2025–26 average
Pos.	Team	Matches	Attendance	Matches	Attendance	Matches	Total	Average	2025–26 average
1	(Germany) Kölner Haie	3	37,009	1	11,812	4	48,821	12,205	—
2	(Switzerland) HC Fribourg-Gottéron	3	23,941	1	7,007	4	30,948	7,737	—
3	(Czech Republic) Dynamo Pardubice	3	22,134	1	7,352	4	29,486	7,372	—
4	(Switzerland) Genève-Servette HC	3	15,285	1	5,449	4	20,734	5,184	—
5	(Sweden) Rögle BK	3	13,797	1	3,469	4	17,266	4,317	—
6	(Germany) Adler Mannheim	3	12,824	1	3,812	4	16,636	4,159	—
7	(Germany) Eisbären Berlin	3	11,769	1	3,240	4	15,009	3,752	4,664
8	(Norway) Storhamar Hockey	3	11,159	0	—	3	11,159	3,720	3,797
9	(France) Bordeaux Boxers	3	10,500	0	—	3	10,500	3,500	—
10	(Czech Republic) Bílí Tygři Liberec	3	10,092	1	3,641	4	13,733	3,433	—
11	(Czech Republic) HC Plzeň	3	8,191	1	5,028	4	13,219	3,305	—
12	(Finland) SaiPa	3	10,030	1	2,446	4	12,476	3,119	—
13	(Austria) Red Bull Salzburg	3	9,100	0	—	3	9,100	3,033	2,802
14	(Sweden) Växjö Lakers	3	9,208	1	2,363	4	11,571	2,893	—
15	(Switzerland) HC Davos	3	9,615	1	1,611	4	11,226	2,807	—
16	(Slovakia) HK Nitra	3	8,686	0	—	3	8,686	2,895	—
17	(Finland) Tappara	3	8,041	1	3,271	4	11,312	2,828	—
18	(Sweden) Frölunda HC	3	7,925	1	2,425	4	10,350	2,588	4,739
19	(Austria) Graz 99ers	3	6,700	0	—	3	6,700	2,233	—
20	(Austria) EC KAC	3	6,341	0	—	3	6,341	2,114	2,897
21	(Finland) KooKoo	3	6,105	1	2,048	4	8,153	2,038	—
22	(Poland) GKS Tychy	3	5,893	0	—	3	5,893	1,964	2,048
23	(Sweden) Skellefteå AIK	3	5,306	1	2,222	4	7,528	1,882	—
24	(Denmark) Herning Blue Fox	3	5,275	0	—	3	5,275	1,758	—
Tournament total		72	274,926	16	67,196	88	342,122	3,888	3,491

Source: Champions Hockey League. The dash indicates that the team did not participate in the 2025–26 competition.

== See also ==
- 2026–27 IIHF Continental Cup
