= 2025–26 DEL season =

- League: Deutsche Eishockey Liga
- Sport: Ice hockey
- Duration: 9 September 2025 – 7 May 2026

Regular season
- Season champions: Kölner Haie
- Season MVP: Janne Juvonen
- Top scorer: Evan Barratt (65 points)
- Relegated to DEL2: Dresdner Eislöwen

Finals
- Champions: Eisbären Berlin
- Runners-up: Adler Mannheim
- Finals MVP: Jonas Stettmer

DEL seasons
- ← 2024–25 2026–27 →

The 2025–26 Deutsche Eishockey Liga season was the 32nd season since the founding of the Deutsche Eishockey Liga. It started on 9 September 2025 and ended on 3 May 2026.

Eisbären Berlin were the two-time defending champions and defeated Adler Mannheim in the final to win their third straight and 12th overall title.

== Format ==
The teams played a double round-robin for 52 games each. After the regular season, places one to six were qualified for the playoffs while place seven to ten played in the pre-playoffs. The playoffs were played in a best of seven mode. The last team from the regular season was relegated to DEL2.

== Teams ==
Locations of the Teams of the 2025–26 DEL season

Team	City	Arena	Capacity
Augsburger Panther	Augsburg	Curt Frenzel Stadium	6,218
Eisbären Berlin	Berlin	Uber Arena	14,200
Fischtown Pinguins	Bremerhaven	Eisarena Bremerhaven	4,674
Dresdner Eislöwen	Dresden	Joynext Arena	4,412
Löwen Frankfurt	Frankfurt	Eissporthalle Frankfurt	6,000
ERC Ingolstadt	Ingolstadt	Saturn Arena	4,815
Iserlohn Roosters	Iserlohn	Eissporthalle Iserlohn	5,000
Kölner Haie	Cologne	Lanxess Arena	18,500
Adler Mannheim	Mannheim	SAP Arena	13,600
EHC Red Bull München	Munich	SAP Garden	11,000
Nürnberg Ice Tigers	Nuremberg	PSD Bank Nürnberg Arena	7,810
Schwenninger Wild Wings	Villingen-Schwenningen	Helios Arena	6,215
Straubing Tigers	Straubing	Eisstadion am Pulverturm	6,000
Grizzlys Wolfsburg	Wolfsburg	Eis Arena Wolfsburg	4,660

== Regular season ==
=== Standings ===
Pos	Team	Pld	W	OTW	OTL	L	GF	GA	GD	Pts	Qualification or relegation
1	Kölner Haie	52	36	3	2	11	200	136	+64	116	Advance to Playoffs and Champions Hockey League
2	Adler Mannheim	52	29	6	4	13	182	122	+60	103	Advance to Playoffs and Champions Hockey League
3	Straubing Tigers	52	32	2	1	17	180	150	+30	101	Playoffs
4	EHC Red Bull München	52	29	5	3	15	179	126	+53	100	Playoffs
5	ERC Ingolstadt	52	28	5	0	19	197	152	+45	94	Playoffs
6	Eisbären Berlin	52	23	6	4	19	171	157	+14	85	Advance to Playoffs and Champions Hockey League
7	Fischtown Pinguins	52	24	4	3	21	162	154	+8	83	Pre-playoffs
8	Grizzlys Wolfsburg	52	20	3	7	22	156	153	+3	73	Pre-playoffs
9	Schwenninger Wild Wings	52	21	3	3	25	147	157	−10	72	Pre-playoffs
10	Nürnberg Ice Tigers	52	20	2	4	26	162	178	−16	68	Pre-playoffs
11	Augsburger Panther	52	13	6	9	24	150	189	−39	60	
12	Iserlohn Roosters	52	14	6	4	28	131	167	−36	58	
13	Löwen Frankfurt	52	13	3	8	28	132	196	−64	53	
14	Dresdner Eislöwen (R)	52	6	2	4	40	109	221	−112	26	Relegated to DEL2

Source: DEL
Rules for classification: 1) points; 2) head-to-head points; 3) head-to-head goal difference; 4) head-to-head number of goals scored.
(R) Relegated

=== Results ===
Home \ Away	AUG	BER	BRE	DRE	FRA	ING	ISE	KÖL	MAN	MUN	NÜR	SCH	STR	WOL	AUG	BER	BRE	DRE	FRA	ING	ISE	KÖL	MAN	MUN	NÜR	SCH	STR	WOL
Augsburger Panther	—	3–4 (Note: Overtime)	2–5	2–4	5–3	4–2	4–1	4–2	3–6	3–8	1–5	5–1	4–9	2–1	—	2–1	1–2	6–3	6–3	3–4	2–3 (Note: Shootout)	1–3	2–3	2–4	2–3	7–6	2–3	5–6
Eisbären Berlin	3–4	—	1–4	6–2	4–2	3–0	5–3	3–4	4–3	1–3	3–2	1–2	2–3	3–2	6–3	—	1–3	5–1	2–3	2–1	5–2	3–4	4–2	5–1	5–2	2–0	2–3	1–2
Fischtown Pinguins	3–4	5–1	—	4–2	5–2	5–2	2–1	2–5	3–6	4–1	4–5	2–1	2–5	0–4	2–1	6–4	—	6–1	5–4	2–3	3–2	2–4	1–2	3–6	3–1	2–5	1–3	2–3
Dresdner Eislöwen	1–4	2–3	4–5	—	4–3	2–4	1–6	2–5	0–3	2–4	1–5	0–2	2–4	0–4	3–1	2–5	2–3	—	4–6	3–2	1–4	1–8	2–6	2–5	3–4	4–3	3–5	1–4
Löwen Frankfurt	4–2	2–3	7–3	3–6	—	0–8	3–0	2–1	3–2	2–1	0–3	3–6	1–3	1–9	3–4	2–3	4–1	3–0	—	1–2	4–5	1–4	2–6	0–5	3–4	1–2	3–7	3–2
ERC Ingolstadt	5–1	5–2	5–2	3–2	5–2	—	2–3	10–3	5–2	6–3	7–4	5–2	6–5	3–2	7–4	8–5	2–3	4–1	6–3	—	4–2	4–5	0–4	1–3	4–1	4–1	5–4	2–1
Iserlohn Roosters	1–4	3–4	1–5	4–3	3–4	5–6	—	1–3	0–4	3–1	6–5	2–3	4–0	3–2	4–2	4–3	0–5	5–4	6–4	5–3	—	4–7	1–2	3–4	4–3	4–2	2–4	2–1
Kölner Haie	3–4	3–7	4–1	5–0	5–0	4–3	3–1	—	3–2	2–4	7–4	4–1	7–4	4–2	6–2	0–1	3–0	7–2	1–4	6–3	4–2	—	5–4	0–2	5–2	6–5	4–2	4–1
Adler Mannheim	7–0	7–1	4–0	3–1	2–3	2–1	4–1	5–2	—	4–3	2–4	0–3	3–0	3–1	3–4	8–5	4–3	2–5	4–3	2–5	5–3	5–1	—	4–3	2–4	4–2	2–3	2–1
EHC Red Bull München	6–3	3–2	3–4	2–1	1–3	2–0	3–1	2–1	4–0	—	4–1	5–4	5–3	5–7	3–2	2–3	6–3	3–1	3–2	4–0	6–0	0–1	2–4	—	3–1	3–1	10–1	4–1
Nürnberg Ice Tigers	3–1	4–5	4–3	8–2	5–2	3–5	2–1	2–4	1–5	2–3	—	4–5	3–5	4–2	3–1	4–5	4–6	5–1	4–3	1–4	1–4	2–4	2–3	5–4	—	2–5	2–3	4–2
Schwenninger Wild Wings	3–5	3–4	2–6	4–1	6–1	2–4	3–0	1–4	2–4	4–2	5–2	—	4–1	3–2	2–1	3–5	0–4	2–5	4–1	5–3	3–2	2–3	0–5	3–1	3–4	—	4–2	4–3
Straubing Tigers	5–3	2–4	3–1	6–1	2–1	4–6	2–0	0–2	0–4	6–2	4–1	1–0	—	6–0	1–4	5–3	3–2	5–3	5–4	6–3	0–2	3–6	4–1	3–6	3–1	5–3	—	4–0
Grizzlys Wolfsburg	3–0	1–6	2–4	6–3	4–1	2–4	3–1	3–4	2–4	4–3	5–3	4–1	2–5	—	4–3	5–2	4–5	4–2	5–2	4–1	4–1	8–5	5–2	2–3	1–4	2–4	2–5	—

Source: DEL
Legend: Blue = home team win; Yellow = draw; Red = away team win.

== Playoffs ==
The playoffs will be held between 17 March and 7 May 2026. The first round will be played in a best-of-three mode, afterwards it will be best-of-seven.

=== Bracket ===
First round
7	Fischtown Pinguins	2
10	Nürnberg Ice Tigers	0
8	Grizzlys Wolfsburg	1
9	Schwenninger Wild Wings	2

Quarterfinals
1	Kölner Haie	4
9	Schwenninger Wild Wings	0
2	Adler Mannheim	4
7	Fischtown Pinguins	1
3	Straubing Tigers	2
6	Eisbären Berlin	4
4	EHC Red Bull München	4
5	ERC Ingolstadt	2

Semifinals
1	Kölner Haie	2
6	Eisbären Berlin	4
(Pairings are re-seeded after the first and second round)
2	Adler Mannheim	4
4	EHC Red Bull München	1

Finals
2	Adler Mannheim	1
6	Eisbären Berlin	4

=== Pre-playoffs ===
The pre-playoffs were played between 17 and 22 March 2026 in a best-of-three mode.

==== Fischtown Pinguins vs Nürnberg Ice Tigers ====
17 March 2026	Fischtown Pinguins	4–0	Nürnberg Ice Tigers	Eisarena Bremerhaven, Bremerhaven	Recap
Ross Mauermann – 14:47		First period	No scoring
Nico Krämmer – 36:11		Second period	No scoring
Ross Mauermann – 43:55; C. J. Smith (PP) – 58:38		Third period	No scoring
Kristers Gudļevskis (31 saves / 31 shots)		Goalie stats	Niklas Treutle (21 saves / 25 shots)

20 March 2026	Nürnberg Ice Tigers	2–3	Fischtown Pinguins	PSD Bank Nürnberg Arena, Nuremberg	Recap
Marcus Weber – 14:24		First period	11:18 – Christian Wejse (PP); 16:25 – C. J. Smith
No scoring		Second period	21:16 – Phillip Bruggisser
Samuel Dove-McFalls (PP) – 54:32		Third period	No scoring
Niklas Treutle (23 saves / 26 shots)		Goalie stats	Kristers Gudļevskis (28 saves / 30 shots)

Bremerhaven won series 2–0

==== Grizzlys Wolfsburg vs Schwenninger Wild Wings ====
18 March 2026	Grizzlys Wolfsburg	3–1	Schwenninger Wild Wings	Eis Arena Wolfsburg, Wolfsburg	Recap
Luis Schinko (PP) – 04:33; Alex Trivellato – 16:54		First period	No scoring
No scoring		Second period	35:08 – Matt White
Luis Schinko – 54:58		Third period	No scoring
Dustin Strahlmeier (34 saves / 35 shots)		Goalie stats	Joacim Eriksson (17 saves / 20 shots)

20 March 2026	Schwenninger Wild Wings	5–1	Grizzlys Wolfsburg	Helios Arena, Villingen-Schwenningen	Recap
Alexander Karachun – 01:09; Kyle Platzer (PP) – 03:39		First period	No scoring
Tyson Spink – 30:18; Eric Martinsson (PP)– 31:53; Philip Feist – 39:17		Second period	32:47 – Gemel Smith (PP)
No scoring		Third period	No scoring
Joacim Eriksson (39 saves / 40 shots)		Goalie stats	Dustin Strahlmeier (9 saves / 14 shots)

22 March 2026	Grizzlys Wolfsburg	2–3	OT	Schwenninger Wild Wings	Eis Arena Wolfsburg, Wolfsburg	Recap
No scoring		First period		No scoring
No scoring		Second period		24:26 – Benjamin Marshall; 26:42 – Alexander Karachun (PP)
Matt White – 43:40; Matt White – 56:47		Third period		No scoring
No scoring		First overtime period		64:14 – Alexander Karachun
Dustin Strahlmeier (28 saves / 31 shots)		Goalie stats		Joacim Eriksson (31 saves / 33 shots)

Schwenningen won series 2–1

=== Quarterfinals ===
The quarterfinals were played between 24 March and 4 April 2025 in a best-of-seven mode.

==== Kölner Haie vs Schwenninger Wild Wings ====
25 March 2026	Schwenninger Wild Wings	0–1	Kölner Haie	Helios Arena, Villingen-Schwenningen	Recap
No scoring		First period	12:53 – Oliwer Kaski
No scoring		Second period	No scoring
No scoring		Third period	No scoring
Joacim Eriksson (31 saves / 32 shots)		Goalie stats	Janne Juvonen (19 saves / 19 shots)

27 March 2026	Kölner Haie	4–2	Schwenninger Wild Wings	Lanxess Arena, Cologne	Recap
Nate Schnarr (PP) – 14:47		First period	08:13 – Phil Hungerecker; 15:39 – Tyson Spink
Dominik Uher – 27:08		Second period	No scoring
Nate Schnarr – 42:15; Louis-Marc Aubry – 59:37		Third period	No scoring
Janne Juvonen (22 saves / 24 shots)		Goalie stats	Joacim Eriksson (26 saves / 30 shots)

29 March 2026	Schwenninger Wild Wings	2–4	Kölner Haie	Helios Arena, Villingen-Schwenningen	Recap
Kyle Platzer – 00:43		First period	04:52 – Dominik Bokk
No scoring		Second period	No scoring
Tyson Spink (PS) – 48:07		Third period	44:11 – Brady Austin; 45:11 – Tanner Kero; 59:48 – Maximilian Kammerer (SH, EN)
Joacim Eriksson (44 saves / 46 shots)		Goalie stats	Janne Juvonen (36 saves / 37 shots)

31 March 2026	Kölner Haie	2–1	3OT	Schwenninger Wild Wings	Lanxess Arena, Cologne	Recap
No scoring		First period		No scoring
Patrick Russell (PP) – 23:36		Second period		No scoring
No scoring		Third period		58:05 – Mirko Höfflin (EA)
Jan Luca Sennhenn – 103:37		Third overtime period		No scoring
Janne Juvonen (28 saves / 30 shots)		Goalie stats		Joacim Eriksson (22 saves / 26 shots)

Cologne won series 4–0

==== Adler Mannheim vs Fischtown Pinguins ====
25 March 2026	Adler Mannheim	5–2	Fischtown Pinguins	SAP Arena, Mannheim	Recap
Marc Michaelis (EA) – 02:59; John Gilmour – 14:44		First period	No scoring
Nicolas Mattinen – 28:24; Luke Esposito – 33:26		Second period	24:55 – Phillip Bruggisser (PP)
Yannick Proske – 49:19		Third period	50:17 – Rayan Bettahar
Maximilian Franzreb (23 saves / 25 shots)		Goalie stats	Kristers Gudļevskis (30 saves / 35 shots)

27 March 2026	Fischtown Pinguins	4–5	OT	Adler Mannheim	Eisarena Bremerhaven, Bremerhaven	Recap
Andy Miele – 12:06		First period		19:36 – Kris Bennett
Adam Conrad – 30:45; Christian Wejse (PP) – 37:28		Second period		21:44 – Kris Bennett; 31:40 – Luke Esposito; 32:16 – Nicolas Mattinen (PP)
Colt Adam Conrad – 58:02		Third period		No scoring
No scoring		First overtime period		65:25 – Zachary Solow (PP)
Kristers Gudļevskis (27 saves / 32 shots)		Goalie stats		Maximilian Franzreb (27 saves / 31 shots)

29 March 2026	Adler Mannheim	5–1	Fischtown Pinguins	SAP Arena, Mannheim	Recap
Justin Schütz – 01:49; William Worge Kreü – 04:35; Matthias Plachta (PP) – 08:14; Nicolas Mattinen – 09:57		First period	No scoring
Kristian Reichel – 32:40		Second period	No scoring
No scoring		Third period	40:36 – Akito Hirose
Maximilian Franzreb (26 saves / 27 shots)		Goalie stats	Leon Hungerecker (20 saves / 21 shots)

31 March 2026	Fischtown Pinguins	6–1	Adler Mannheim	Eisarena Bremerhaven, Bremerhaven	Recap
C. J. Smith – 16:18		First period	No scoring
Akito Hirose – 28:34; Matthew Abt – 31:05; Colt Adam Conrad (EA) – 33:44		Second period	22:55 – Justin Schütz
Nico Krämmer – 40:21; Phillip Bruggisser (EN) – 43:37		Third period	No scoring
Leon Hungerecker (22 saves / 23 shots)		Goalie stats	Maximilian Franzreb (30 saves / 36 shots)

2 April 2026	Adler Mannheim	4–3	Fischtown Pinguins	SAP Arena, Mannheim	Recap
No scoring		First period	No scoring
Zachary Solow (PP) – 37:00; Matthias Plachta – 39:50		Second period	20:38 – Jan Urbas; 35:28 – Andy Miele
Nicolas Mattinen (PP2) – 50:18; Kris Bennett – 55:13		Third period	41:16 – Nicholas Jensen
Maximilian Franzreb (21 saves / 24 shots)		Goalie stats	Leon Hungerecker (29 saves / 33 shots)

Mannheim won series 4–1

==== Straubing Tigers vs Eisbären Berlin ====
24 March 2026	Straubing Tigers	5–1	Eisbären Berlin	Eisstadion am Pulverturm, Straubing	Recap
Tim Fleischer – 00:44; Tyler Madden – 01:28; Tim Brunnhuber – 01:57		First period	No scoring
Danjo Leonhardt – 22:18		Second period	No scoring
Nicholas Halloran – 41:10		Third period	54:32 – Liam Kirk (PP)
Henrik Haukeland (31 saves / 27 shots)		Goalie stats	Jonas Stettmer (23 saves / 28 shots)

27 March 2026	Eisbären Berlin	2–1	Straubing Tigers	Uber Arena, Berlin	Recap
Ty Ronning – 13:40		First period	17:21 – Stefan Loibl
Ty Ronning (PP) – 20:57		Second period	No scoring
No scoring		Third period	No scoring
Jonas Stettmer (22 saves / 23 shots)		Goalie stats	Henrik Haukeland (24 saves / 26 shots)

29 March 2026	Straubing Tigers	2–4	Eisbären Berlin	Eisstadion am Pulverturm, Straubing	Recap
Michael Connolly – 06:29		First period	03:43 – Lester Lancaster; 10:01 – Marcel Noebels
Marcel Brandt (PP) – 22:01		Second period	26:54 – Lean Bergmann; 28:04 – Ty Ronning
No scoring		Third period	No scoring
Henrik Haukeland (24 saves / 28 shots)		Goalie stats	Jonas Stettmer (37 saves / 39 shots)

31 March 2026	Eisbären Berlin	2–1	Straubing Tigers	Uber Arena, Berlin	Recap
Marcel Noebels – 05:09; Ty Ronning – 09:50		First period	No scoring
No scoring		Second period	No scoring
No scoring		Third period	59:01 – Tyler Madden (EA)
Jonas Stettmer (37 saves / 38 shots)		Goalie stats	Henrik Haukeland (21 saves / 23 shots)

2 April 2026	Straubing Tigers	2–1	OT	Eisbären Berlin	Eisstadion am Pulverturm, Straubing	Recap
No scoring		First period		09:47 – Eric Mik
Wade Allison – 26:11		Second period		No scoring
No scoring		Third period		No scoring
Elis Hede (PP) – 67:24		First overtime period		No scoring
Henrik Haukeland (19 saves / 20 shots)		Goalie stats		Jonas Stettmer (25 saves / 27 shots)

4 April 2026	Eisbären Berlin	6–5	OT	Straubing Tigers	Uber Arena, Berlin	Recap
Yannick Veilleux – 17:12; Andreas Eder – 19:35		First period		16:19 – Marcel Brandt
Adam Smith – 22:05; Ty Ronning – 36:19; Jonas Müller – 39:52		Second period		27:38 – (PP) Nicholas Halloran; 29:15 – Adrian Klein
No scoring		Third period		48:57 – Tim Fleischer (PP); 58:12 – Nicholas Halloran (EA)
Markus Vikingstad – 76:30		First overtime period		No scoring
Jonas Stettmer (31 saves / 36 shots)		Goalie stats		Henrik Haukeland (29 saves / 35 shots)

Berlin won series 4–2

==== EHC Red Bull München vs ERC Ingolstadt ====
24 March 2026	EHC Red Bull München	5–6	ERC Ingolstadt	SAP Garden, Munich	Recap
No scoring		First period	05:22 – Myles Powell
Jeremy McKenna – 28:08; Brady Ferguson – 39:21		Second period	21:33 – Riley Barber (PP); 22:27 – Peter Abbandonato; 25:37 – Kenny Agostino
Tobias Rieder (EA) – 55:21; Brady Ferguson (EA) – 58:44; Ville Pokka (EA) – 59:44		Third period	45:00 – Alex Breton; 55:44 – Johannes Krauß
Antoine Bibeau (21 saves / 27 shots)		Goalie stats	Devin Williams (37 saves / 43 shots)

27 March 2026	ERC Ingolstadt	1–6	EHC Red Bull München	Saturn Arena, Ingolstadt	Recap
No scoring		First period	10:01 – Tobias Rieder (PP); 17:18 – Chris DeSousa (PP)
No scoring		Second period	No scoring
Austen Keating (PP) – 44:45		Third period	40:29 – Jeremy McKenna; 51:46 – Maximilian Kastner; 54:11 – Tobias Rieder; 56:30 – Taro Hirose (PP)
Brett Brochu (19 saves / 25 shots)		Goalie stats	Simon Wolf (21 saves / 22 shots)

29 March 2026	EHC Red Bull München	5–2	ERC Ingolstadt	SAP Garden, Munich	Recap
Markus Eisenschmi – 02:15; Taro Hirose – 02:41		First period	No scoring
Jeremy McKenna – 33:22; Markus Eisenschmid – 37:23		Second period	32:34 – Philipp Krauß; 32:58 – Myles Powell
Tobias Rieder – 49:43		Third period	No scoring
Simon Wolf (32 saves / 34 shots)		Goalie stats	Devin Williams (21 saves / 25 shots)

31 March 2026	ERC Ingolstadt	7–2	EHC Red Bull München	Saturn Arena, Ingolstadt	Recap
Philipp Krauß – 03:10; Riley Barber (PP2) – 10:07; Alex Breton (PP) – 10:44; Riley Barber (PP) – 10:57; Myles Powell – 18:15		First period	No scoring
Alex Breton (PP2) – 37:29		Second period	25:36 – Chris DeSousa (PP)
Alex Breton (PP2) – 50:15		Third period	43:44 – Veit Oswald
Devin Williams (28 saves / 30 shots)		Goalie stats	Antoine Bibeau (14 saves / 16 shots)

2 April 2026	EHC Red Bull München	6–3	ERC Ingolstadt	SAP Garden, Munich	Recap
Patrick Hager – 04:05; Yasin Ehliz – 16:21		First period	No scoring
Veit Oswald – 29:18; Tobias Rieder – 37:58		Second period	22:59 – Philipp Krauß; 28:50 – Peter Abbandonato; 35:31 – Riley Barber (PP)
Alberts Šmits – 45:33; Brady Ferguson (EN) – 59:07		Third period	No scoring
Antoine Bibeau (22 saves / 25 shots)		Goalie stats	Devin Williams (23 saves / 29 shots)

4 April 2026	ERC Ingolstadt	3–7	EHC Red Bull München	Saturn Arena, Ingolstadt	Recap
Philipp Krauß – 12:47; Philipp Krauß – 16:41		First period	03:44 – Taro Hirose
Morgan Ellis – 24:24		Second period	20:41 – Maximilian Daubner; 26:06– Philipp Krening; 31:28 – Chris DeSousa
No scoring		Third period	47:52 – Tobias Rieder; 54:41 – Alberts Šmits (EN); 57:29 – Chris DeSousa (EN)
Brett Brochu (19 saves / 26 shots)		Goalie stats	Antoine Bibeau (32 saves / 35 shots)

Munich won series 4–2

=== Semifinals ===
The quarterfinals were played between 8 and 20 April 2026 in a best-of-seven mode.

==== Kölner Haie vs Eisbären Berlin ====
8 April 2026	Eisbären Berlin	6–3	Kölner Haie	Uber Arena, Berlin	Recap
Adam Smith – 04:14; Moritz Kretzschmar – 06:20		First period	08:52 – Valtteri Kemiläinen (PP)
Marcel Noebels – 23:42; Jonas Müller – 24:48; Moritz Kretzschmar – 53:22		Second period	33:30 – Patrick Russell (SH)
Lester Lancaster (EN) – 57:22		Third period	58:07 – Gregor MacLeod
Jonas Stettmer (33 saves / 37 shots)		Goalie stats	Janne Juvonen (7 saves / 12 shots)

10 April 2026	Kölner Haie	5–1	Eisbären Berlin	Lanxess Arena, Cologne	Recap
No scoring		First period	14:39 – Yannick Veilleux
Patrick Russell – 21:57; Patrick Russell – 28:42; Dominik Bokk – 29:04; Louis-Marc Aubry – 33:53		Second period	No scoring
Gregor MacLeod – 43:34		Third period	No scoring
Janne Juvonen (33 saves / 34 shots)		Goalie stats	Jonas Stettmer (15 saves / 19 shots)

12 April 2026	Eisbären Berlin	4–2	Kölner Haie	Uber Arena, Berlin	Recap
No scoring		First period	No scoring
Leonhard Pföderl (PP) – 22:04		Second period	No scoring
Jonas Müller – 41:20; Lester Lancaster – 45:03; Leonhard Pföderl (EN) – 57:56		Third period	52:54 – Dominik Bokk; 55:30 – Oliwer Kaski (EA)
Jake Hildebrand (18 saves / 20 shots)		Goalie stats	Janne Juvonen (52 saves / 55 shots)

15 April 2026	Kölner Haie	4–3	OT	Eisbären Berlin	Lanxess Arena, Cologne	Recap
Frederik Storm – 00:42		First period		13:40 – Ty Ronning (PP)
Tanner Kero – 23:31; Dominik Bokk – 32:05		Second period		20:20 – Kai Wissmann
No scoring		Third period		51:48 – Liam Kirk (PP)
Dominik Bokk – 77:47		First overtime period		No scoring
Janne Juvonen (35 saves / 38 shots)		Goalie stats		Jake Hildebrand (16 saves / 19 shots)

17 April 2026	Eisbären Berlin	5–2	Kölner Haie	Uber Arena, Berlin	Recap
No scoring		First period	No scoring
Adam Smith – 24:55; Manuel Wiederer (SH) – 26:15		Second period	31:54 – Dominik Bokk
Jonas Müller – 42:02; Liam Kirk (EN) – 58:04; Marcel Noebels (EN) – 59:14		Third period	53:30 – Gregor MacLeod (PP)
Jonas Stettmer (31 saves / 33 shots)		Goalie stats	Janne Juvonen (24 saves / 27 shots)

20 April 2026	Kölner Haie	1–4	Eisbären Berlin	Lanxess Arena, Cologne	Recap
Parker Tuomie – 15:41		First period	06:59 – Jonas Müller; 09:24 – Frederik Tiffels
No scoring		Second period	No scoring
No scoring		Third period	58:46 – Yannick Veilleux (EN); 59:27 – Markus Vikingstad (EN)
Janne Juvonen (33 saves / 37 shots)		Goalie stats	Jonas Stettmer (29 saves / 30 shots)

Berlin won series 4–2

==== Adler Mannheim vs EHC Red Bull München ====
8 April 2026	Adler Mannheim	3–2	OT	EHC Red Bull München	SAP Arena, Mannheim	Recap
John Gilmour – 04:14		First period		19:52 – Taro Hirose
No scoring		Second period		38:57 – Nikolaus Heigl
Zachary Solow – 41:15		Third period		No scoring
Marc Michaelis – 72:08		First overtime period		No scoring
Maximilian Franzreb (42 saves / 44 shots)		Goalie stats		Antoine Bibeau (33 saves / 36 shots)

10 April 2026	EHC Red Bull München	2–3	OT	Adler Mannheim	SAP Garden, Munich	Recap
No scoring		First period		No scoring
Yasin Ehliz – 31:07; Tobias Rieder (PP) – 32:39		Second period		34:28 – Nicolas Mattinen (PP)
No scoring		Third period		53:01 – Matthias Plachta
No scoring		First overtime period		63:52 – Justin Schütz
Antoine Bibeau (17 saves / 20 shots)		Goalie stats		Maximilian Franzreb (28 saves / 30 shots)

12 April 2026	Adler Mannheim	4–1	EHC Red Bull München	SAP Arena, Mannheim	Recap
No scoring		First period	No scoring
Leon Gawanke – 39:14		Second period	No scoring
Yasin Ehliz – 41:20; Anthony Greco (EN) – 58:08; Tom Kühnhackl (EN) – 58:59		Third period	51:47 – Justin Schütz
Maximilian Franzreb (22 saves / 23 shots)		Goalie stats	Antoine Bibeau (20 saves / 22 shots)

14 April 2026	EHC Red Bull München	5–1	Adler Mannheim	SAP Garden, Munich	Recap
Adam Brooks – 07:03		First period	12:41 – Kristian Reichel
Yasin Ehliz (PP) – 37:22		Second period	No scoring
Patrick Hager – 45:08; Markus Eisenschmid – 45:54; Konrad Abeltshauser (SH, EN) – 55:14		Third period	No scoring
Antoine Bibeau (23 saves / 24 shots)		Goalie stats	Maximilian Franzreb (26 saves / 30 shots)

17 April 2026	Adler Mannheim	4–1	EHC Red Bull München	SAP Arena, Mannheim	Recap
Alexander Ehl – 03:18		First period	07:26 – Tobias Rieder
Nicolas Mattinen (PP) – 22:41; Matthias Plachta – 33:33		Second period	No scoring
Leon Gawanke – 40:42		Third period	No scoring
Maximilian Franzreb (27 saves / 28 shots)		Goalie stats	Antoine Bibeau (24 saves / 28 shots)

Mannheim won series 4–1

=== Final ===
The final was played between 24 April and 7 May 2026 in a best-of-seven mode.

24 April 2026	Adler Mannheim	3–7	Eisbären Berlin	SAP Arena, Mannheim	Recap
No scoring		First period	07:41 – Liam Kirk; 10:46 – Jean-Sébastien Dea; 18:12 – Lester Lancaster
No scoring		Second period	34:16 – Ty Ronning; 35:24 – Markus Vikingstad
Kris Bennett – 41:33; Alexander Ehl – 47:26; John Gilmour (EA) – 55:21		Third period	56:02 – Marcel Noebels (EN); 57:32 – Liam Kirk (EN)
Maximilian Franzreb (22 saves / 27 shots)		Goalie stats	Jonas Stettmer (34 saves / 37 shots)

26 April 2026	Eisbären Berlin	5–1	Adler Mannheim	Uber Arena, Berlin	Recap
Manuel Wiederer – 02:25		First period	No scoring
Liam Kirk – 22:33		Second period	No scoring
Leonhard Pföderl – 46:19; Leonhard Pföderl – 53:25; Eric Hördler – 53:35		Third period	57:39 – Zachary Solow (PP, EA)
Jonas Stettmer (18 saves / 19 shots)		Goalie stats	Maximilian Franzreb (20 saves / 25 shots)

28 April 2026	Adler Mannheim	1–5	Eisbären Berlin	SAP Arena, Mannheim	Recap
Marc Michaelis (PP) – 02:39		First period	10:44 – Eric Mik
No scoring		Second period	24:26 – Lester Lancaster; 38:17 – Eric Mik
No scoring		Third period	50:41 – Eric Mik; 51:09 – Liam Kirk
Maximilian Franzreb (16 saves / 21 shots)		Goalie stats	Jonas Stettmer (24 saves / 25 shots)

30 April 2026	Eisbären Berlin	3–4	2OT	Adler Mannheim	Uber Arena, Berlin	Recap
No scoring		First period		No scoring
Lester Lancaster (PP) – 22:09; Liam Kirk – 27:26		Second period		31:46 – Nicolas Mattinen (PP)
Markus Vikingstad – 46:51		Third period		52:49 – Zachary Solow (PP); 56:59 – Alexander Ehl
No scoring		Second overtime period		83:45 – Luke Esposito
Jonas Stettmer (46 saves / 50 shots)		Goalie stats		Johan Mattsson (34 saves / 37 shots)

3 May 2026	Adler Mannheim	1–4	Eisbären Berlin	SAP Arena, Mannheim

Berlin won series 4–1

== Statistics ==
=== Scoring leaders ===
List shows the top skaters sorted by points, then goals.

Player	Team	GP	G	A	Pts	+/−	PIM	POS
(United States) Evan Barratt	Nürnberg Ice Tigers	51	16	49	65	−4	43	F
(United States) Riley Barber	ERC Ingolstadt	52	32	31	63	+22	29	F
(Denmark) Patrick Russell	Kölner Haie	52	27	33	60	+19	27	F
(United States) Nicholas Halloran	Straubing Tigers	51	22	36	58	+18	18	F
(United Kingdom) Liam Kirk	Eisbären Berlin	52	32	23	55	+11	14	F
(Canada) Taro Hirose	EHC Red Bull München	50	9	45	54	+34	6	F
(Canada) Gregor MacLeod	Kölner Haie	41	18	35	53	+14	10	F
(Canada) Nicolas Mattinen	Adler Mannheim	52	20	30	50	+25	50	D
(Canada) Alex Breton	ERC Ingolstadt	52	15	35	50	+15	18	D
(Germany) Alexander Blank	Augsburger Panther	52	19	28	47	+1	16	F

=== Leading goaltenders ===
Only the top five goaltenders, based on save percentage.

Player	Team	TOI	GA	GAA	SA	Sv%	SO
(Finland) Janne Juvonen	Kölner Haie	1937	66	2.04	963	93.15	5
(Canada) Antoine Bibeau	EHC Red Bull München	1715	55	1.92	720	92.36	4
(Latvia) Kristers Gudļevskis	Fischtown Pinguins	904	34	2.26	431	92.11	1
(Germany) Maximilian Franzreb	Adler Mannheim	2003	70	2.10	885	92.09	4
(Germany) Dustin Strahlmeier	Grizzlys Wolfsburg	2502	105	2.52	1255	91.63	3

== Awards ==
The awards were announced on 16 March 2026.

Award	Player
Player of the year	(Finland) Janne Juvonen
Goaltender of the year	(Finland) Janne Juvonen
Defenceman of the year	(Canada) Nicolas Mattinen
Forward of the year	(United States) Riley Barber
Youth player of the year	(Germany) Fabio Kose
Coach of the year	(Finland) Kari Jalonen
Finals MVP	(Germany) Jonas Stettmer
