= Jonas Müller =

Jonas Müller may refer to:

- Jonas Müller (ice hockey) (born 1995), German ice hockey player
- Jonas Müller (luger) (born 1997), Austrian luger
