= William Worge Kreü =

Swedish ice hockey player

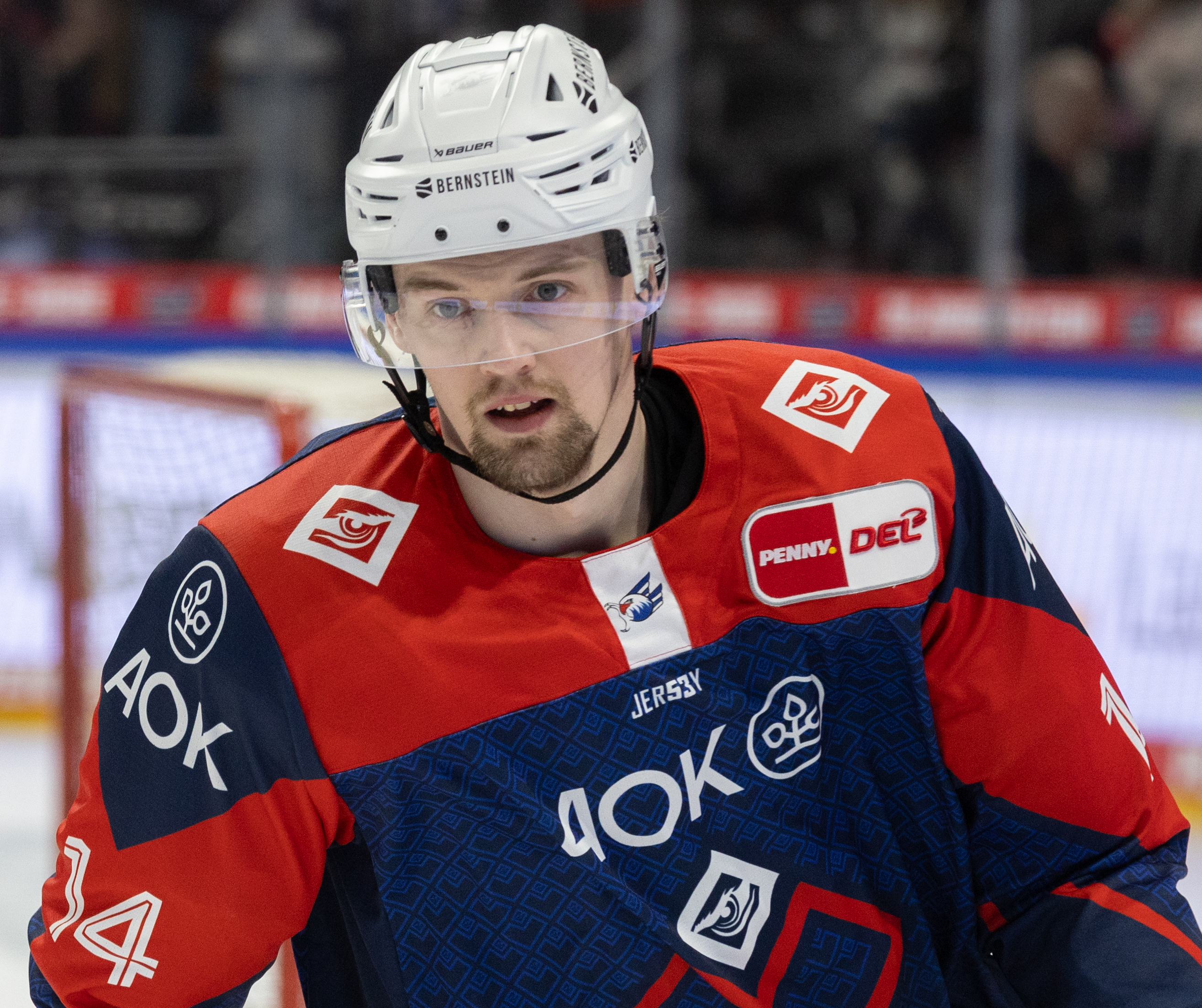
- William Worge Kreü in 2026
- Born: May 15, 2000 (age 26) Linköping, Sweden
- Height: 6 ft 5 in (196 cm)
- Weight: 185 lb (84 kg; 13 st 3 lb)
- Position: Defence
- Shoots: Left
- team Former teams: Free agent Linköping HC; IK Oskarshamn; Jukurit; Adler Mannheim
- NHL draft: 187th overall, 2018; Buffalo Sabres
- Playing career: 2018–present

William Worge Kreü (born May 15, 2000) is a Swedish professional ice hockey defenceman who is currently an unrestricted free agent. He most recently played for Adler Mannheim in the Deutsche Eishockey Liga. William was drafted in the seventh round, 187th overall, by the Buffalo Sabres in the 2018 NHL entry draft.

== Playing career ==
Worge Kreü made his professional debut in the Swedish Hockey League (SHL) for Linköping HC during the 2017–18 SHL season. He has also appeared in the Swedish top flight for IK Oskarshamn.

Leaving the SHL following seven seasons, Worge Kreü was signed to the neighbouring Finnish Liiga in joining Mikkelin Jukurit for the 2025–26 season on 31 July 2025. He made 47 regular season appearances with Jukurit, posting 10 points from the blueline, before leaving the club and securing a contract for the remainder of the season with German outfit, Adler Mannheim of the Deutsche Eishockey Liga (DEL) on 22 February 2026.

== Career statistics ==
			Regular season					Playoffs
Season	Team	League	GP	G	A	Pts	PIM	GP	G	A	Pts	PIM
2016–17	Linköping HC	J20	2	0	0	0	0	—	—	—	—	—
2017–18	Linköping HC	J20	38	3	11	14	40	3	0	0	0	2
2017–18	Linköping HC	SHL	1	0	0	0	0	—	—	—	—	—
2018–19	Linköping HC	J20	24	0	3	3	36	6	0	2	2	2
2019–20	Linköping HC	J20	24	1	10	11	74	—	—	—	—	—
2019–20	Linköping HC	SHL	25	1	2	3	10	—	—	—	—	—
2020–21	Linköping HC	J20	2	1	0	1	2	—	—	—	—	—
2020–21	Linköping HC	SHL	31	0	4	4	8	—	—	—	—	—
2020–21	Väsby IK	Allsv	5	1	2	3	4	—	—	—	—	—
2021–22	IK Oskarshamn	SHL	47	1	5	6	31	10	0	0	0	16
2022–23	IK Oskarshamn	SHL	50	0	3	3	61	3	0	0	0	25
2023–24	Linköping HC	SHL	46	1	8	9	14	4	0	0	0	2
2024–25	Linköping HC	SHL	45	0	7	7	16	—	—	—	—	—
2025–26	Jukurit	Liiga	47	3	7	10	70	—	—	—	—	—
2025–26	Adler Mannheim	DEL	4	0	0	0	0	13	1	3	4	4
SHL totals			245	3	29	32	140	17	0	0	0	43
Liiga totals			47	3	7	10	70	—	—	—	—	—
