= Tobias Rieder =

German ice hockey player (born 1993)

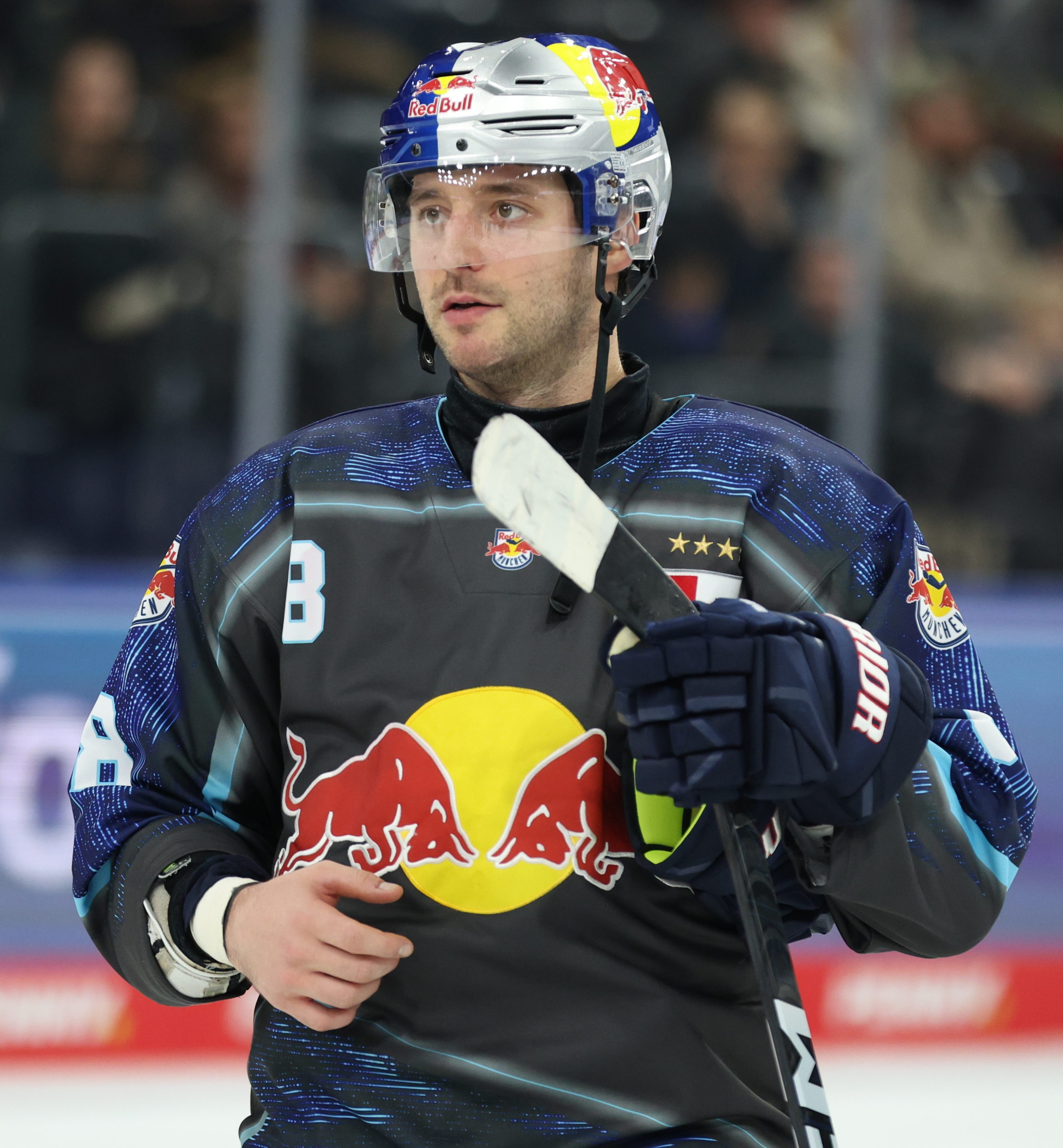
- Rieder with Munich in 2024
- Born: 10 January 1993 (age 33) Landshut, Germany
- Height: 5 ft 11 in (180 cm)
- Weight: 181 lb (82 kg; 12 st 13 lb)
- Position: Forward
- Shoots: Left
- DEL team Former teams: EHC München; Arizona Coyotes; Los Angeles Kings; Edmonton Oilers; Calgary Flames; Buffalo Sabres; Växjö Lakers
- National team: Germany
- NHL draft: 114th overall, 2011; Edmonton Oilers
- Playing career: 2009–present

Tobias Rieder (born 10 January 1993) is a German professional ice hockey player who is a forward for EHC Red Bull München of the Deutsche Eishockey Liga (DEL). Rieder was originally selected by the Edmonton Oilers in the fourth round, 114th overall, of the 2011 NHL entry draft, and made his National Hockey League (NHL) debut in 2014–15 with the Arizona Coyotes. He has also played for the Los Angeles Kings, Edmonton Oilers, Calgary Flames and Buffalo Sabres.

== Playing career ==
Having been drafted by the Edmonton Oilers in the 2011 NHL entry draft on 29 March 2013, Rieder's playing rights were traded to the Phoenix Coyotes in exchange for Kale Kessy. At the conclusion of his major junior career in the 2012–13 season with the Kitchener Rangers of the Ontario Hockey League (OHL), on 15 April, Rieder signed a three-year, entry-level contract with Phoenix.

In the 2014–15 season, his second professional campaign in North America, Rieder received his first NHL recall by the Coyotes from the club's American Hockey League (AHL) affiliate, the Portland Pirates, on 2 November 2014. That same day, he scored his first NHL goal, the game-winner for the Coyotes. On 1 December, Rieder set an NHL record for a first-year player by scoring two shorthanded goals 58 seconds apart during the same penalty kill in a 5–2 win against the Edmonton Oilers.

On 21 February 2018, during the 2017–18 season, Rieder, along with goaltender Scott Wedgewood, was traded to the Los Angeles Kings in exchange for goaltender Darcy Kuemper. In the final stretch of the regular season, he appeared in 20 games with the Kings, scoring four goals and six points. Rieder made his Stanley Cup playoff debut in Los Angeles' first-round sweep to the Vegas Golden Knights.

On 1 July 2018, as a free agent, Rieder returned to the Edmonton Oilers organization after signing a one-year, $2 million contract. Signing with the Oilers with the lofty ambition to play alongside countryman Leon Draisaitl, Rieder was unable to contribute early in the 2018–19 season, finding himself in a bottom six checking-line role. Failing to register a goal with the Oilers after 60 games, Rieder was singled out publicly by Oilers' CEO Bob Nicholson, stating their intention not to sign him after the season, on which Nicholson later apologised. Rieder completed the season with a career-low 11 assists in 67 games.

On 25 June 2019, Rieder was not tendered a qualifying offer from the Oilers, releasing him as a free agent. On 4 September Rieder was invited on a professional tryout (PTO) agreement by the Calgary Flames. On 27 September, after a successful preseason, he was signed to a one-year, two-way contract with the Flames.

On 16 August 2020, Rieder scored his third shorthanded goal of the 2020 Stanley Cup playoffs in game four against the Dallas Stars, tying an NHL record for most shorthanded goals in one playoff season, joining Derek Sanderson (1969), Bill Barber (1980), Lorne Henning (1980), Wayne Gretzky (1983), Wayne Presley (1989), and Todd Marchant (1997). He finished with 5 points in 10 postseason games.

As a free agent from the Flames, Rieder was signed by the Buffalo Sabres to a one-year, $700,000 contract on 9 October 2020.

Leaving the Sabres at the conclusion of his contract, as a free agent approaching the 2021–22 NHL season, Rieder accepted an invitation from the Anaheim Ducks to attend their training camp on a professional tryout (PTO) basis on 15 September 2021. After his release from Anaheim, Rieder signed a one-year contract with the Växjö Lakers of the Swedish Hockey League (SHL). He recorded 11 goals and 11 assists in 36 games during the 2021–22 SHL season, and was then re-signed to a two-year contract on 17 April 2022.

After conclusion of this contract with the Växjö Lakers after the 2023–24 SHL season, Rieder returned to Germany and signed a one-year contract with Red Bull München of the Deutsche Eishockey Liga (DEL). In August 2025, it was announced that he was re-signed by the team. In April 2026, he was once again re-signed by Red Bull München.

== International play ==
Rieder was named to the Germany national team and made his debut at the 2014 World Championship.

On 25 January 2022, Rieder was selected to play for Germany at the 2022 Winter Olympics. He also played for Germany in the 2026 Winter Olympics.

== Career statistics ==
=== Regular season and playoffs ===
			Regular season					Playoffs
Season	Team	League	GP	G	A	Pts	PIM	GP	G	A	Pts	PIM
2008–09	Landshut Cannibals	DNL	36	27	24	51	18	9	6	8	14	10
2009–10	Landshut Cannibals	DNL	5	6	3	9	25	4	5	1	6	2
2009–10	Landshut Cannibals	2.GBun	45	10	13	23	28	6	0	0	0	0
2010–11	Kitchener Rangers	OHL	65	23	26	49	35	7	0	2	2	4
2011–12	Kitchener Rangers	OHL	60	42	42	84	25	16	13	14	27	4
2012–13	Kitchener Rangers	OHL	52	27	29	56	12	9	2	10	12	4
2013–14	Portland Pirates	AHL	64	28	20	48	10	—	—	—	—	—
2014–15	Portland Pirates	AHL	9	4	1	5	0	—	—	—	—	—
2014–15	Arizona Coyotes	NHL	72	13	8	21	14	—	—	—	—	—
2015–16	Arizona Coyotes	NHL	82	14	23	37	10	—	—	—	—	—
2016–17	Arizona Coyotes	NHL	80	16	18	34	6	—	—	—	—	—
2017–18	Arizona Coyotes	NHL	58	8	11	19	6	—	—	—	—	—
2017–18	Los Angeles Kings	NHL	20	4	2	6	0	4	0	0	0	0
2018–19	Edmonton Oilers	NHL	67	0	11	11	8	—	—	—	—	—
2019–20	Calgary Flames	NHL	55	4	6	10	6	10	3	2	5	0
2020–21	Buffalo Sabres	NHL	44	5	2	7	2	—	—	—	—	—
2021–22	Växjö Lakers	SHL	36	11	11	22	4	4	0	0	0	0
2022–23	Växjö Lakers	SHL	40	14	7	21	4	18	2	4	6	0
2023–24	Växjö Lakers	SHL	42	9	17	26	2	—	—	—	—	—
2024–25	EHC München	DEL	48	12	13	25	11	6	3	0	3	2
2025–26	EHC München	DEL	33	16	9	25	2	11	8	4	12	2
NHL totals			478	64	81	145	52	14	3	2	5	0
SHL totals			118	34	35	69	10	22	2	4	6	0
DEL totals			83	29	22	51	13	17	11	4	15	4

=== International ===
Year	Team	Event	Result	GP	G	A	Pts	PIM
2009	Germany	U17	6th	5	0	0	0	0
2009	Germany	WJC18	10th	6	1	3	4	8
2010	Germany	WJC D1	11th	5	4	2	6	0
2010	Germany	WJC18 D1	11th	5	6	1	7	12
2011	Germany	WJC	10th	6	1	1	2	0
2011	Germany	WJC18	6th	3	3	0	3	0
2012	Germany	WJC D1A	11th	5	5	8	13	4
2013	Germany	WJC	9th	6	3	2	5	0
2014	Germany	WC	14th	7	1	0	1	0
2015	Germany	WC	10th	7	0	3	3	0
2016	Germany	WC	7th	4	1	1	2	0
2016	Germany	OGQ	Q	3	1	2	3	0
2016	Team Europe	WCH	2nd	6	0	1	1	0
2021	Germany	WC	4th	10	1	3	4	2
2022	Germany	OG	10th	4	1	1	2	0
2026	Germany	OG	6th	5	0	1	1	2
Junior totals				41	23	17	40	24
Senior totals				49	6	12	18	4
