= Janne Juvonen =

Finnish ice hockey player

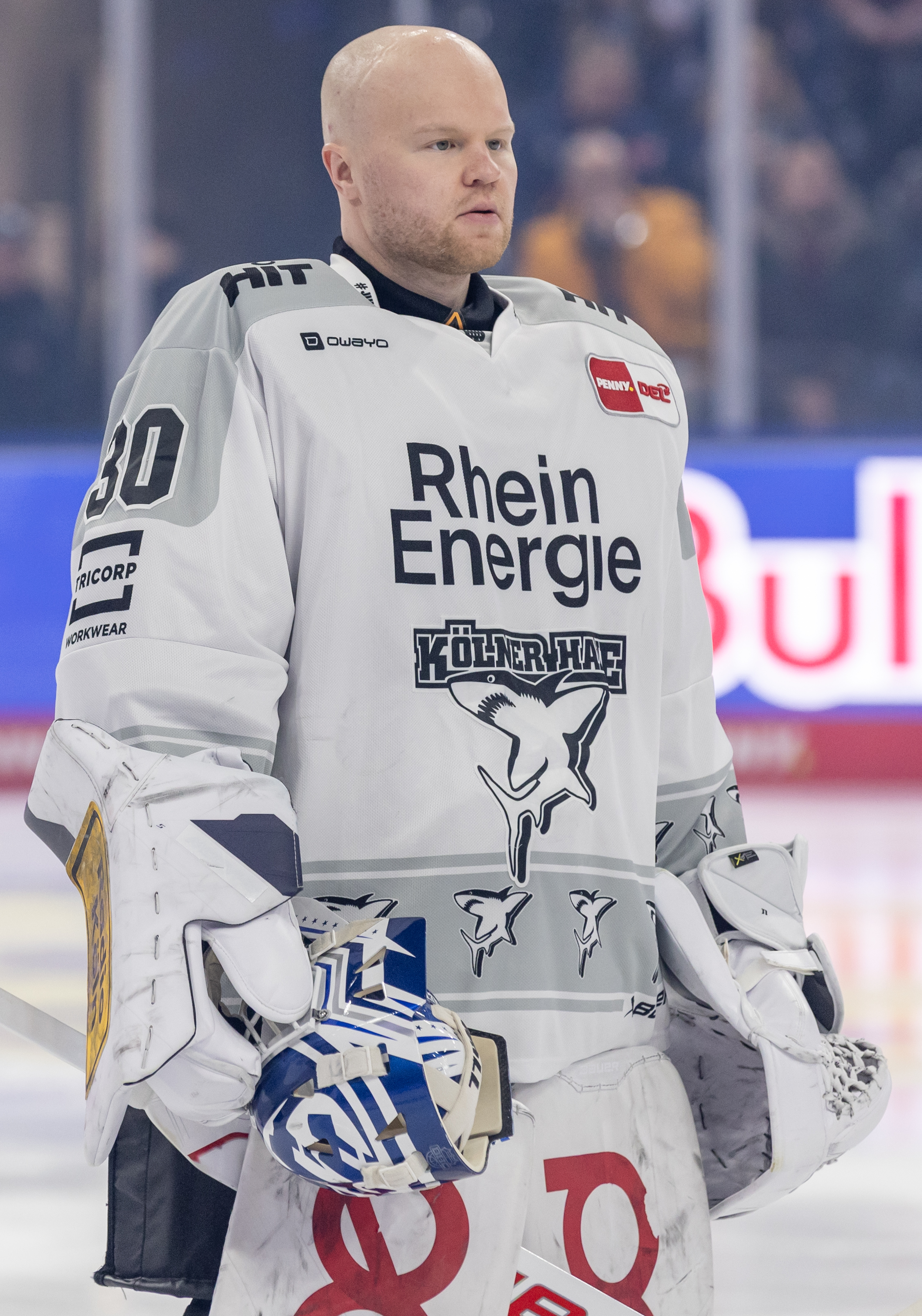
- Juvonen in 2025
- Born: 3 October 1994 (age 32) Kiihtelysvaara, Finland
- Height: 6 ft 1 in (185 cm)
- Weight: 183 lb (83 kg; 13 st 1 lb)
- Position: Goaltender
- Catches: Left
- DEL team Former teams: Kölner Haie; Lahti Pelicans; HC TWK Innsbruck; Mora IK; Leksands IF; Jokerit; HC Ambrì-Piotta
- NHL draft: 203rd overall, 2013; Nashville Predators
- Playing career: 2012–present

Janne Juvonen (born 3 October 1994) is a Finnish professional ice hockey goaltender who plays for Kölner Haie of the Deutsche Eishockey Liga (DEL). Juvonen was selected by the Nashville Predators in the 7th round (203rd overall) of the 2013 NHL entry draft.

== Playing career ==
Juvonen made his SM-liiga debut playing with Lahti Pelicans during the 2011–12 SM-liiga season. Following the 2017–18 season Juvonen signed with Austrian team HC TWK Innsbruck. However, following ten games with the team, he signed with Swedish team Mora IK.

Following Mora IK's relegation to the HockeyAllsvenskan, Juvonen opted to remain in the SHL, signing a two-year contract with newly promoted Leksands IF on 10 May 2019.

Juvonen backstopped Leksands for two seasons before leaving the club as a free agent to sign a two-year contract with Finnish-based club Jokerit of the KHL, on 5 May 2021.

Amid Jokerit's withdrawal from the league due to the Russia-Ukraine conflict, in March 2022, Juvonen signed with HC Ambrì-Piotta of the National League (NL) to finish the season. He spent the next three seasons with the club, winning the Spengler Cup with the team in 2022.

In October 2025, Juvonen signed with Kölner Haie of the Deutsche Eishockey Liga (DEL).

Medal record

Representing Finland

Ice hockey

World Championships
Silver medal – second place	2021 Latvia	

== Awards and honours ==
Award	Year
DEL
Player of the year	2026
Goaltender of the year	2026
