= Ari Gröndahl =

Finnish ice hockey player

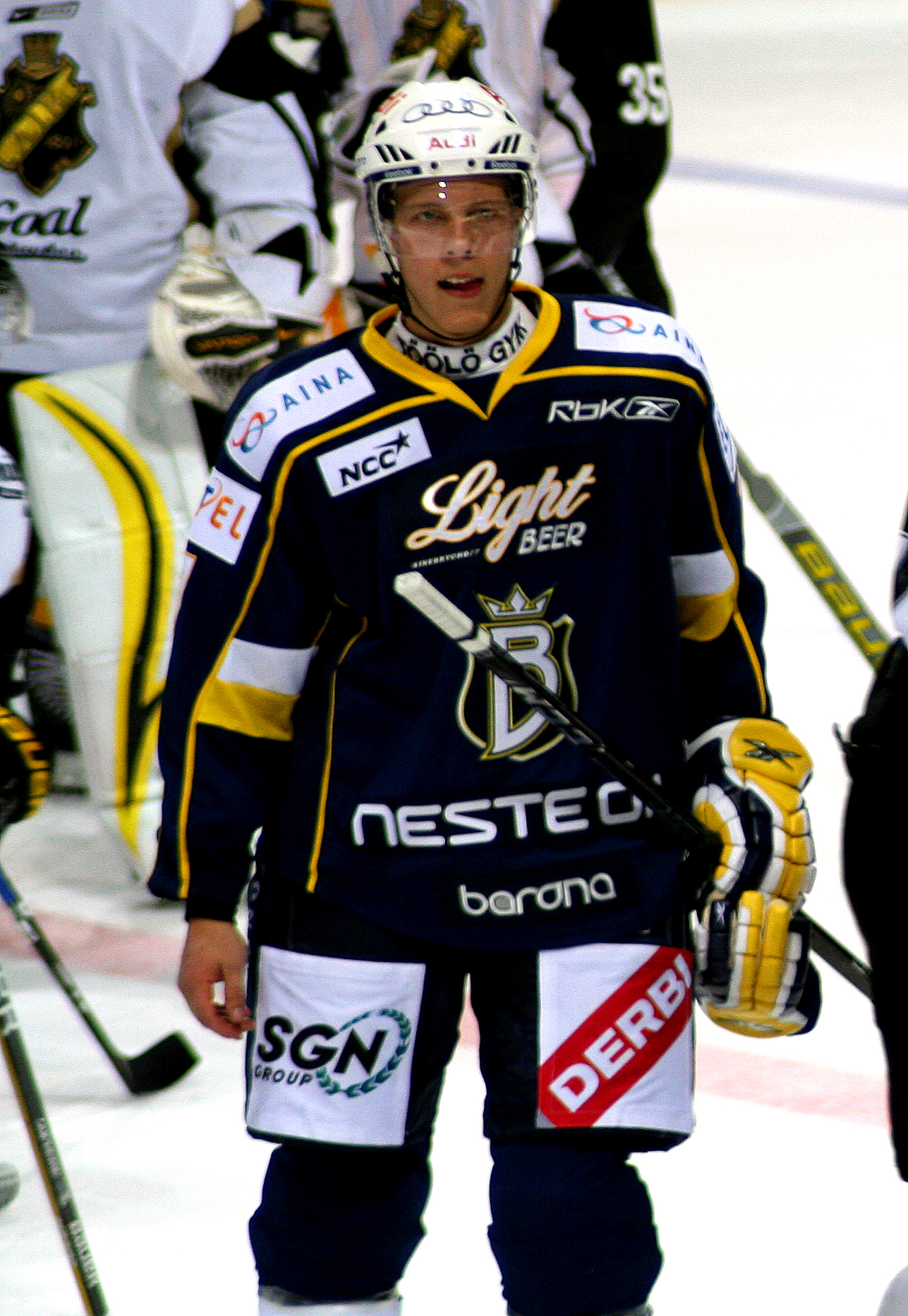
- Born: 11 August 1989 (age 37) Helsinki, Finland
- Height: 6 ft 5 in (196 cm)
- Weight: 223 lb (101 kg; 15 st 13 lb)
- Position: Defence
- Shoots: Right
- Mestis team: Vaasan Sport
- Playing career: 2009–present

Ari Gröndahl is a Finnish professional ice hockey defenceman who currently plays for Vaasan Sport of the Mestis.
