= John Gilmour (ice hockey) =

Canadian ice hockey player

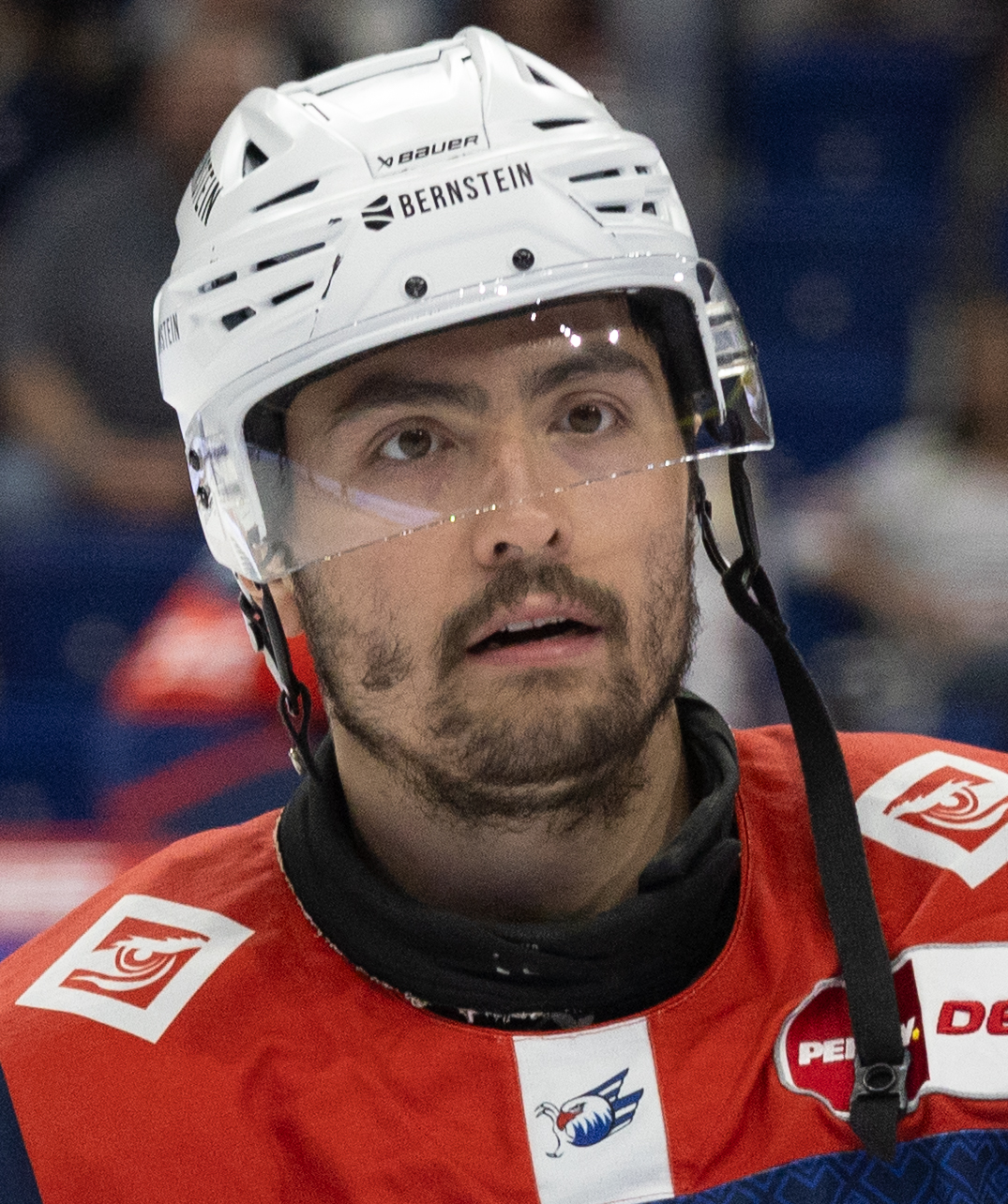
- Gilmour in 2026
- Born: May 17, 1993 (age 33) Montreal, Quebec, Canada
- Height: 6 ft 0 in (183 cm)
- Weight: 195 lb (88 kg; 13 st 13 lb)
- Position: Defence
- Shoots: Left
- DEL team Former teams: Adler Mannheim; New York Rangers; Buffalo Sabres; CSKA Moscow; Dinamo Minsk
- NHL draft: 198th overall, 2013; Calgary Flames
- Playing career: 2016–present

John A. Gilmour (born May 17, 1993) is a Canadian professional ice hockey defenceman who is currently playing for Adler Mannheim of the Deutsche Eishockey Liga (DEL).

== Playing career ==
Prior to joining Providence College, Gilmour played in the United States Hockey League for the Cedar Rapids RoughRiders and Gilmour Academy. It was while he was playing for the Roughriders that Gilmour committed to play NCAA Division 1 hockey for Providence College.

Gilmour was drafted 198th overall in the 2013 NHL entry draft by the Calgary Flames. The Flames did not offer him a contract and he continued playing for Providence College.

On August 18, 2016, Gilmour signed a two-year, $1.85 million entry-level contract with the New York Rangers. Gilmour spent the first half of the season in the AHL, and was named to the 2018 AHL all-star game. He made his NHL debut in a 4–3 win over the Flames on February 9, 2018. Gilmour recorded his first NHL goal on February 13, 2018, in a 3–2 loss to the Minnesota Wild. Gilmour became the first New York Rangers rookie defenseman to score an overtime goal when he scored a goal 1:22 into overtime on February 28, 2018, against the Vancouver Canucks.

While attending the Rangers training camp, Gilmour was reassigned to the Hartford Wolf Pack to begin the 2018–19 season. During the season, Gilmour set a Wolf Pack franchise record for goals by a defenseman in a season with 20, and was named an AHL All-star for the second consecutive season.

On July 1, 2019, Gilmour left the Rangers as a free agent to sign a one-year, one-way $700,000 contract with the Buffalo Sabres. He began the 2019–20 season, with the Sabres as a healthy scratch before he was assigned on a conditioning stint to AHL affiliate, the Rochester Americans. He appeared in 4 games with the Sabres, going scoreless.

As a free agent from the Sabres, and with the 2020–21 North American season delayed due to the COVID-19 pandemic, Gilmour belatedly signed a contract abroad in agreeing to a one-year deal with Russian club, HC CSKA Moscow of the KHL, on December 14, 2020.

Following two seasons with CSKA, culminating in capturing the Gagarin Cup, Gilmour left as a free agent and was signed to a two-year contract to continue in the KHL with Belarusian club, HC Dinamo Minsk, on July 24, 2022.

Following one season with Dinamo, Gilmour was released from his contract and moved to Germany in signing a two-year contract with Adler Mannheim of the DEL, on April 21, 2023.

== Career statistics ==
			Regular season					Playoffs
Season	Team	League	GP	G	A	Pts	PIM	GP	G	A	Pts	PIM
2011–12	Cedar Rapids RoughRiders	USHL	58	10	14	24	14	2	0	1	1	0
2012–13	Providence College	HE	38	4	9	13	35	—	—	—	—	—
2013–14	Providence College	HE	39	5	13	18	22	—	—	—	—	—
2014–15	Providence College	HE	30	4	7	11	10	—	—	—	—	—
2015–16	Providence College	HE	34	9	14	23	18	—	—	—	—	—
2016–17	Hartford Wolf Pack	AHL	76	6	19	25	18	—	—	—	—	—
2017–18	Hartford Wolf Pack	AHL	44	6	20	26	22	—	—	—	—	—
2017–18	New York Rangers	NHL	28	2	3	5	14	—	—	—	—	—
2018–19	Hartford Wolf Pack	AHL	70	20	34	54	31	—	—	—	—	—
2018–19	New York Rangers	NHL	5	0	0	0	4	—	—	—	—	—
2019–20	Rochester Americans	AHL	37	6	7	13	6	—	—	—	—	—
2019–20	Buffalo Sabres	NHL	4	0	0	0	0	—	—	—	—	—
2020–21	CSKA Moscow	KHL	12	3	3	6	2	17	1	3	4	8
2021–22	CSKA Moscow	KHL	45	1	8	9	12	14	0	3	3	8
2022–23	Dinamo Minsk	KHL	52	1	8	9	14	2	0	0	0	0
2023–24	Adler Mannheim	DEL	51	6	21	27	9	7	1	2	3	0
2024–25	Adler Mannheim	DEL	51	8	19	27	12	10	1	1	2	0
NHL totals			37	2	3	5	18	—	—	—	—	—
KHL totals			109	5	19	24	28	33	1	6	7	16

== Awards and honours ==
Award	Year
AHL
First All-Star Team	2019
KHL
Gagarin Cup (CSKA Moscow)	2022
