= Liam Kirk (ice hockey) =

English ice hockey player (born 2000)

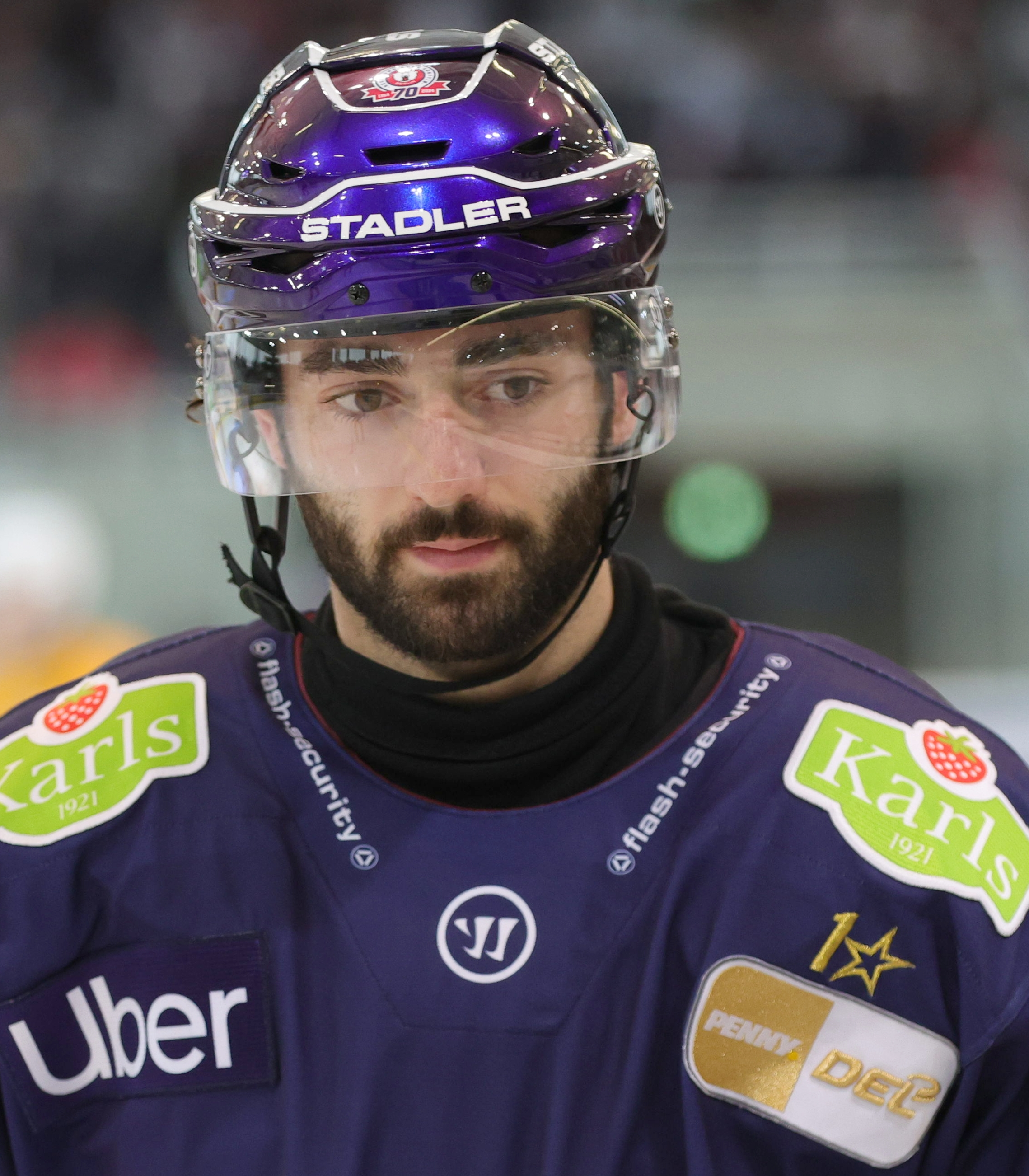
- Liam Kirk (2024)
- Born: 3 January 2000 (age 26) Maltby, England
- Height: 6 ft 1 in (185 cm)
- Weight: 156 lb (71 kg; 11 st 2 lb)
- Position: Forward
- Shoots: Left
- DEL team Former teams: Eisbären Berlin; Sheffield Steelers; Tucson Roadrunners; Jukurit; HC Litvínov
- National team: Great Britain
- NHL draft: 189th overall, 2018; Arizona Coyotes
- Playing career: 2016–present

Liam Kirk (born 3 January 2000) is an English professional ice hockey player who is a forward for Eisbären Berlin of the Deutsche Eishockey Liga (DEL). Kirk began his career with the Elite Ice Hockey League club the Sheffield Steelers.

Internationally, Kirk has played for the Great Britain national team, helping them win promotion to the Elite Division at the 2018 IIHF World Championship Division I tournament, before playing an important role in the 2021 World Championship.

In June 2018, Kirk was drafted in the 2018 NHL entry draft by the Arizona Coyotes, becoming the first player born and trained in England to be selected by an NHL team.

== Playing career ==
=== Sheffield Steelers ===
Growing up in Maltby, a small former mining town in South Yorkshire, Kirk first got into hockey when his parents and family went to watch the Sheffield Steelers. His brother Jonathan got into ice hockey and Kirk wanted to be like his brother, so he also started playing.

Kirk began playing for the Sheffield Junior Academy. He was selected for the Midlands Conference – a team consisting of the best players from the Midlands region of the UK at U11, U13, U15 and U17 level – every year of eligibility, winning the EIHA Conference Tournament twice and being named a tournament all-star six times out of a possible eight, as well as being named tournament MVP three times.

Playing in the England U18 North League in the 2015–16 season, Kirk amassed a league-leading 98 points, with 60 goals and 38 assists. The same year, the U18 team from Sheffield won the league title. He was also selected for the Great Britain U16s.

Continuing his success as an U18, Kirk played in the now-defunct EPIHL for the Sheffield Steeldogs and was signed by the Sheffield Steelers on a three-year apprentice contract.

=== Junior ===
Kirk was selected in the 7th round, 189th overall, in the 2018 NHL entry draft by the Arizona Coyotes. He became the first player born and trained in England to be drafted into the NHL. Kirk was selected 8th overall in the CHL Import Draft later in June and played for the Peterborough Petes of the Ontario Hockey League (OHL).

=== European loan spells ===
With the 2020–21 OHL season not scheduled to begin until December 2020, due to the COVID-19 pandemic, Kirk opted to remain in Europe initially signing a loan for Swedish Hockeyettan side Hanhals IF on a short-term deal on 17 October 2020.

In February 2021, Kirk temporarily returned to the UK by signing on loan with NIHL side Sheffield Steeldogs ahead of their Spring Cup series. In March 2021, Kirk was named as part of the Sheffield Steelers squad for the 2021 'Elite Series'.

=== Arizona Coyotes ===
On 18 June 2021, Kirk signed a three-year, entry-level contract with the Coyotes. On 28 July 2021, the Coyotes officially announced Kirk was signed to a three-year, entry-level contract with the club, becoming the first English-born and trained player to sign an NHL contract.

He started the 2021–22 season in the AHL with the Coyotes' affiliate, the Tucson Roadrunners. Kirk played in eight games, scoring two goals and three points, before suffering a season-ending knee injury in November 2021.

Returning to health for the 2022–23 season, Kirk continued his tenure in the AHL with the Tucson Roadrunners. Serving mostly as a healthy scratch and featuring in just a solitary game with the Roadrunners, Kirk was re-assigned by the Coyotes to the secondary affiliate Atlanta Gladiators of the ECHL. Kirk registered 5 goals and 11 points through 15 games with the Gladiators before accepting a loan assignment from the Coyotes to return to Europe, joining Finnish top-flight club Mikkelin Jukurit, for the remainder of the season on 29 December 2022.

=== Return to Europe ===
On 6 September 2023, Kirk was placed on unconditional waivers by the Coyotes for the purposes of contract termination. It was subsequently announced that Kirk signed with HC Litvínov in the Czech Extraliga. Kirk had played previously as a left winger but found success as a goalscorer when moved to play as a center on Litvínov's third line. During the season Kirk would go on to play on the second and first lines, along with the team's powerplay unit. In the 2023–2024 playoffs, Kirk led Litvínov in both goals and points, taking them to the semi-finals for the first time since the 2014–2015 season. He ended the season breaking the record for most goals scored by a Litvínov player in the playoffs, and eclipsed the top scorer in the playoffs over the last three years.

On 12 May 2024, Eisbären Berlin of the Deutsche Eishockey Liga announced that Kirk had signed a two-year contract with them.

== International play ==
Kirk has played for the Great Britain national team in several international tournaments at both the junior and senior level.

In the 2017–18 season, he played for the U18s, coming away with a gold medal. For the U20s, he collected a range of awards such as Best Forward, Most Points, Most Assists, Most Goals, as well as the Best Face-off Percentage (71.43%) and a bronze medal.

His senior debut came at the 2018 IIHF World Championship Division I, where he helped Great Britain earn promotion to the 2019 World Championship. It marked Great Britain's first appearance in the elite division since 1994. Kirk played five games, though he did not score a point.

Two years later, Kirk starred for Great Britain at the 2021 IIHF World Championship - scoring his first senior points and going on to finish joint-top of the goalscoring charts with seven goals in seven matches.

Kirk, who finished with nine points to his name, also helped Great Britain to a first regulation time win at the elite level since 1962 with a 4-3 win over Belarus on 26 May 2021, and an overall team points tally of four. He was named in the all-star team for his performance.

== Career statistics ==
=== Regular season and playoffs ===
			Regular season					Playoffs
Season	Team	League	GP	G	A	Pts	PIM	GP	G	A	Pts	PIM
2015–16	Sheffield Steeldogs	EPIHL	15	0	1	1	0	2	1	1	2	0
2015–16	Sheffield Spartans	NIHL	7	4	2	6	0	—	—	—	—	—
2016–17	Sheffield Steelers	EIHL	19	0	0	0	2	—	—	—	—	—
2016–17	Sheffield Steeldogs	EPIHL	38	20	25	45	12	—	—	—	—	—
2017–18	Sheffield Steelers	EIHL	52	9	7	16	6	—	—	—	—	—
2018–19	Peterborough Petes	OHL	63	26	21	47	26	5	0	1	1	0
2019–20	Peterborough Petes	OHL	47	21	29	50	25	—	—	—	—	—
2020–21	Hanhals IF	Div.1	12	5	5	10	2	—	—	—	—	—
2020–21	Sheffield Steeldogs	NIHL	12	21	11	32	2	—	—	—	—	—
2020–21	Sheffield Steelers	Elite Series	14	10	10	20	4	—	—	—	—	—
2021–22	Tucson Roadrunners	AHL	8	2	1	3	2	—	—	—	—	—
2022–23	Tucson Roadrunners	AHL	1	0	0	0	2	—	—	—	—	—
2022–23	Atlanta Gladiators	ECHL	15	5	6	11	8	—	—	—	—	—
2022–23	Jukurit	Liiga	25	7	12	19	12	—	—	—	—	—
2023–24	HC Litvínov	ELH	52	19	11	30	20	13	9	4	13	4
2024–25	Eisbären Berlin	DEL	48	23	21	44	14	14	8	7	15	0
2025–26	Eisbären Berlin	DEL	52	32	23	55	14	17	9	7	16	6
AHL totals			9	2	1	3	4	—	—	—	—	—
DEL totals			100	55	44	99	28	31	17	14	31	6

=== International ===
Year	Team	Event	GP	G	A	Pts	PIM
2016	Great Britain	WJC18-D2	5	2	1	3	4
2017	Great Britain	WJC18-D2	5	6	2	8	6
2017	Great Britain	WJC-D1	5	2	2	4	0
2018	Great Britain	WJC18-D2	5	4	3	7	2
2018	Great Britain	WJC-D2	5	7	7	14	6
2018	Great Britain	WC-D1	5	0	0	0	0
2019	Great Britain	WJC-D2	5	5	9	14	4
2019	Great Britain	WC	6	0	0	0	0
2021	Great Britain	WC	7	7	2	9	4
2023	Great Britain	WC D1A	5	3	7	10	0
2024	Great Britain	WC	6	2	2	4	0
2024	Great Britain	OGQ	6	5	8	13	4
2025	Great Britain	WC D1A	3	3	4	7	0
2026	Great Britain	WC	7	1	1	2	6
Junior totals			30	26	24	50	22
Senior totals			45	21	24	45	14

== Awards and honours ==
Award	Year
DEL
Champion	2025, 2026
International
U18 IIHF WJC - D1A - Gold medal	2018
WC All-Star Team	2021
