= Marc Michaelis =

German ice hockey player (born 1995)

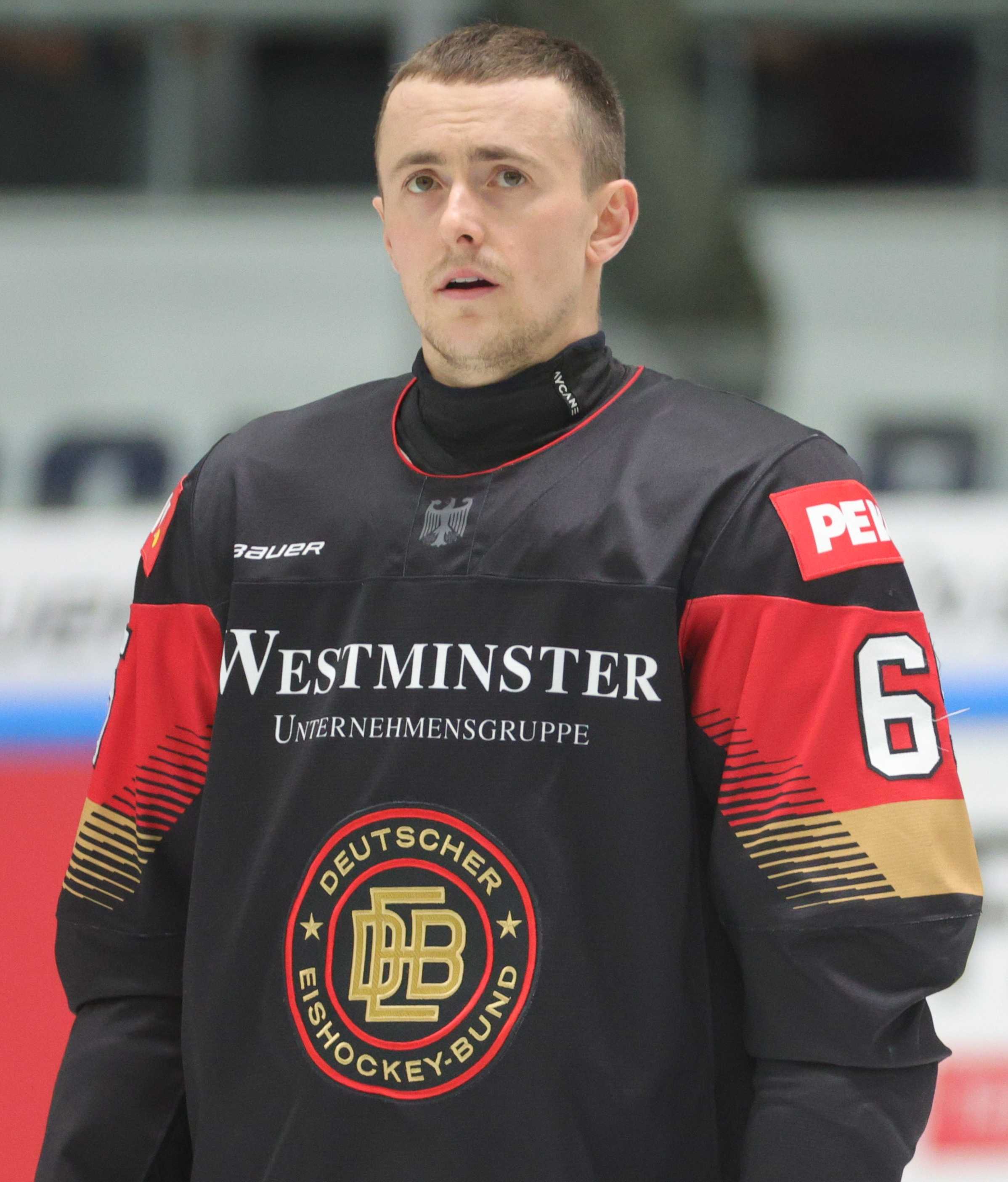
- Michaelis with Germany during the 2024 IIHF World Championship
- Born: 31 July 1995 (age 30) Mannheim, Germany
- Height: 5 ft 11 in (180 cm)
- Weight: 187 lb (85 kg; 13 st 5 lb)
- Position: Forward
- Shoots: Left
- DEL team Former teams: Adler Mannheim; Vancouver Canucks; SCL Tigers; EV Zug
- National team: Germany
- NHL draft: Undrafted
- Playing career: 2018–present

Marc Michaelis (born 31 July 1995) is a German professional ice hockey player who is a forward for Adler Mannheim of the Deutsche Eishockey Liga (DEL).

== Playing career ==
Undrafted, Michaelis originally played in his native Germany within the Adler Mannheim junior program, before moving to North America to continue his development in the North American Hockey League (NAHL) and United States Hockey League (USHL).

Michaelis continued to commit to a collegiate career with Minnesota State University of the Western Collegiate Hockey Association (WCHA). In four seasons with the Mavericks, two as team Captain between the 2018–19 season and 2019–20 season, Michaelis accumulated 162 points in 148 games. In his senior year, Michaelis led the team in scoring with 44 points in 31 games played and was named the WCHA Offensive Player of the Year.

As an undrafted free agent and looking to embark on his professional career, Michaelis opted to sign a one-year, $700,000 contract with the Vancouver Canucks on March 20, 2020. In the pandemic delayed and shortened 2020–21 season, Michaelis made his Canucks debut on March 4, 2021, replacing an injured Elias Pettersson in a 3-1 win over the Toronto Maple Leafs. He appeared in 15 games for the regular season going scoreless.

As an impending restricted free agent, Michaelis was not tendered a qualifying by the Canucks and was released as a free agent. On August 18, 2021, he agreed to a one-year AHL contract with the Toronto Marlies, the primary affiliate to the Toronto Maple Leafs.

On June 28, 2022, Michaelis opted to pause his North American career in agreeing to a one-year contract as a free agent with Swiss club, SCL Tigers of the NL.

== International play ==
Michaelis represented Germany at the 2019 IIHF World Championship.

== Career statistics ==
=== Regular season and playoffs ===
			Regular season					Playoffs
Season	Team	League	GP	G	A	Pts	PIM	GP	G	A	Pts	PIM
2011–12	Jungadler Mannheim	DNL	34	2	11	13	8	6	0	1	1	2
2012–13	Jungadler Mannheim	DNL	34	27	34	61	12	7	2	14	16	2
2013–14	Jungadler Mannheim	DNL	36	28	37	65	22	7	3	4	7	2
2014–15	Minnesota Magicians	NAHL	27	9	21	30	8	—	—	—	—	—
2014–15	Green Bay Gamblers	USHL	32	15	8	23	6	—	—	—	—	—
2015–16	Green Bay Gamblers	USHL	59	10	41	51	18	4	1	1	2	0
2016–17	Minnesota State U.	WCHA	39	14	22	36	12	—	—	—	—	—
2017–18	Minnesota State U.	WCHA	36	18	22	40	20	—	—	—	—	—
2018–19	Minnesota State U.	WCHA	42	19	23	42	25	—	—	—	—	—
2019–20	Minnesota State U.	WCHA	31	20	24	44	8	—	—	—	—	—
2020–21	Vancouver Canucks	NHL	15	0	0	0	2	—	—	—	—	—
2021–22	Toronto Marlies	AHL	22	5	8	13	2	—	—	—	—	—
2022–23	SCL Tigers	NL	45	15	24	39	22	—	—	—	—	—
2023–24	EV Zug	NL	50	13	24	37	14	11	2	4	6	0
2024–25	Adler Mannheim	DEL	52	12	19	31	14	10	3	4	7	7
2025–26	Adler Mannheim	DEL	52	11	31	42	14	15	4	5	9	10
NHL totals			15	0	0	0	2	—	—	—	—	—
NL totals			95	28	48	76	36	11	2	4	6	0
DEL totals			104	23	50	73	28	25	7	9	16	17

=== International ===
Year	Team	Event	Result	GP	G	A	Pts	PIM
2013	Germany	U18	8th	5	0	0	0	0
2015	Germany	WJC	10th	6	0	2	2	0
2018	Germany	WC	11th	7	1	2	3	2
2019	Germany	WC	6th	6	2	0	2	0
2022	Germany	WC	7th	8	2	5	7	0
2024	Germany	WC	6th	8	3	5	8	4
2025	Germany	WC	9th	7	1	2	3	0
2026	Germany	OG	6th	5	0	0	0	2
2026	Germany	WC	10th	7	1	5	6	0
Junior totals				11	0	2	2	0
Senior totals				48	10	19	29	8

== Awards and honours ==
Award	Year	Ref
All-WCHA Rookie Team	2016–17	
All-WCHA First Team	2016–17, 2017–18, 2018–19, 2019–20	
AHCA West First-Team All-American	2019–20	

Awards and achievements
Preceded by Corey Mackin	WCHA Rookie of the Year; 2016–17	Succeeded by Jake Jaremko
Preceded by Award Created	WCHA Offensive Player of the Year; 2019–20	Succeeded by Julian Napravnik
Preceded by Troy Loggins	WCHA Player of the Year; 2019–20	Succeeded by Dryden McKay
