= Yannick Veilleux =

Canadian ice hockey player

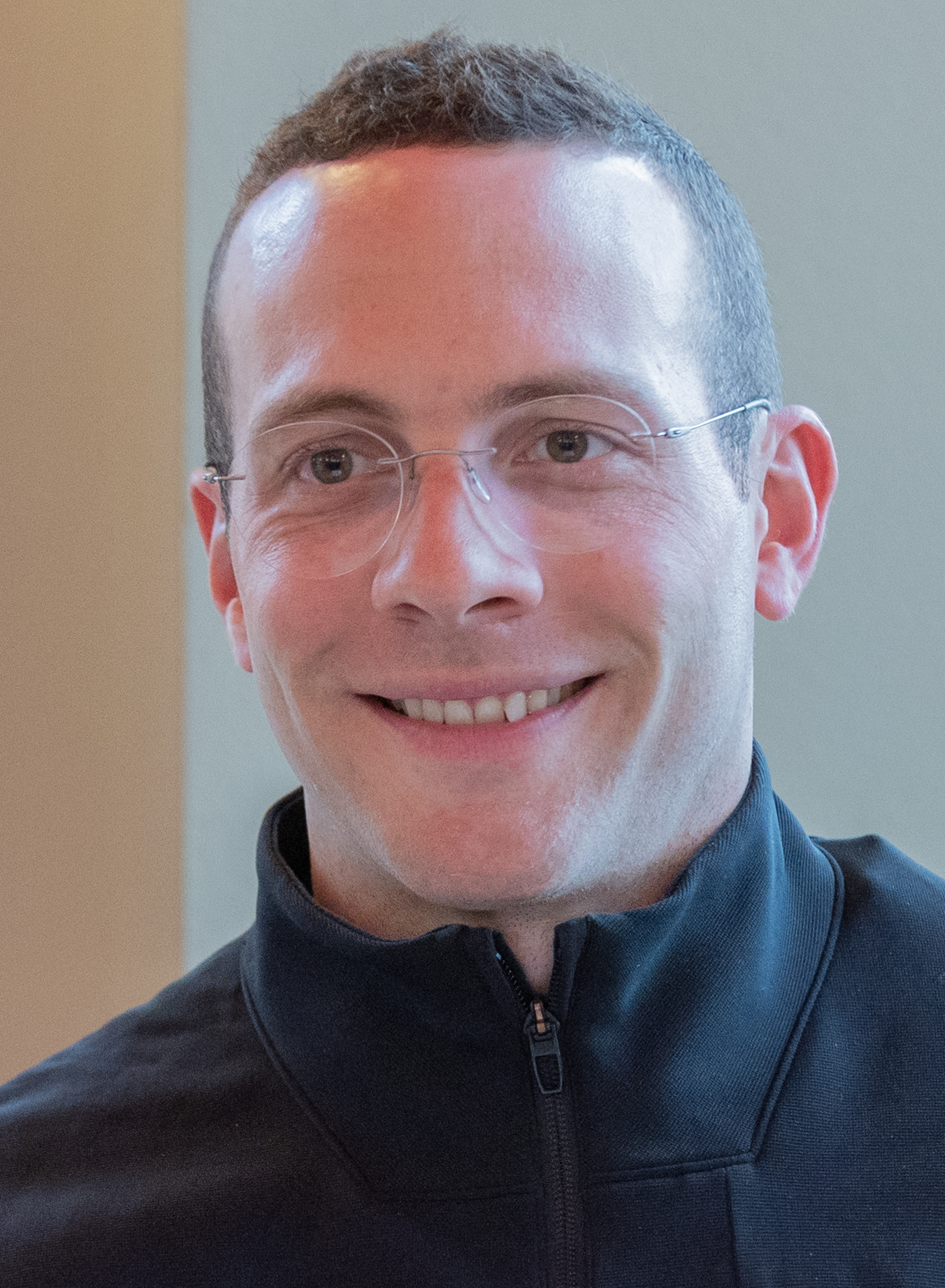
- Veilleux with the Eisbären Berlin in 2026
- Born: February 22, 1993 (age 33) Saint-Hippolyte, Quebec, Canada
- Height: 6 ft 2 in (188 cm)
- Weight: 190 lb (86 kg; 13 st 8 lb)
- Position: Left wing
- Shoots: Left
- DEL team Former teams: Eisbären Berlin; Peoria Rivermen; Chicago Wolves; St. John's IceCaps; Laval Rocket; Rochester Americans
- NHL draft: 102nd overall, 2011; St. Louis Blues
- Playing career: 2013–present

Yannick Veilleux (born February 22, 1993) is a Canadian professional ice hockey player. He is currently playing with Eisbären Berlin in the Deutsche Eishockey Liga (DEL). Veilleux was selected by the St. Louis Blues in the 4th round (102nd overall) of the 2011 NHL entry draft.

== Playing career ==
Veilleux was selected second overall by the Shawinigan Cataractes in the 2009 QMJHL Entry Draft. He led the Cataractes to win the 2012 Memorial Cup before being traded, prior to the start of the 2012–13 season, to the Moncton Wildcats in exchange for defenceman Brandon Gormley.

On March 6, 2013, the St. Louis Blues signed Veilleux to a three-year, entry-level contract. For the duration of his rookie contract with the Blues, Veilleux remained primarily with its AHL affiliates, the Peoria Rivermen and Chicago Wolves, appearing in 167 games.

Veilleux was not tendered a qualifying offer at the conclusion of his contract with the Blues and remained an unsigned free agent heading into the 2016–17 season. On October 12, 2016, Veilleux agreed to a one-year AHL contract with the St. John's IceCaps, affiliate to the Montreal Canadiens. In the 2016-17 season, Veilleux split the season between the IceCaps and secondary affiliate, the Brampton Beast. He featured in 53 games, adding to the forward depth of the IceCaps with 6 goals and 16 points.

As a free agent, Veilleux opted to remain within the Canadiens organization, signing a one-year AHL contract with new affiliate, the Laval Rocket, on July 20, 2017. In the 2017–18 season, he appeared in a depth forward line role with the Rocket, contributing with 3 goals and 7 points in 52 games.

After two seasons within the Canadiens organization, Veilleux left as a free agent and later agreed to a one-year AHL contract with the Rochester Americans, affiliate to the Buffalo Sabres, on August 3, 2018. In the 2018–19 season, Veilleux made 50 appearances for the Americans in a checking-line role, notching 5 goals and 8 points.

Having played the last five seasons primarily in the AHL, Veilleux, as a free agent, opted to return to the Kalamazoo Wings of the ECHL, signing a one-year contract on October 1, 2019.

On March 17, 2021, Veilleux was suspended two games by the AHL for using an obscene gesture during a game versus the Toronto Marlies. He was suspended again a few games later following a knee-on-knee hit on Martin Pospisil. Veilleux was once again suspended on May 6, 2021, a one-game ban for boarding.

Following two productive seasons with the Rocket, Veilleux left North America as a free agent, signing his first contract abroad with German club Eisbären Berlin of the DEL, on June 29, 2021.

== Career statistics ==
=== Regular season and playoffs ===
			Regular season					Playoffs
Season	Team	League	GP	G	A	Pts	PIM	GP	G	A	Pts	PIM
2008–09	Saint-Eustache Vikings	QMAAA	43	21	13	34	44	5	1	4	5	23
2009–10	Shawinigan Cataractes	QMJHL	55	3	6	9	17	6	0	0	0	6
2010–11	Shawinigan Cataractes	QMJHL	68	19	29	48	40	12	2	5	7	14
2011–12	Shawinigan Cataractes	QMJHL	59	27	31	58	69	11	5	6	11	17
2012–13	Moncton Wildcats	QMJHL	65	34	39	73	102	4	2	0	2	10
2012–13	Peoria Rivermen	AHL	8	2	1	3	0	—	—	—	—	—
2013–14	Chicago Wolves	AHL	4	0	1	1	5	—	—	—	—	—
2013–14	Kalamazoo Wings	ECHL	62	16	23	39	65	6	3	0	3	4
2014–15	Chicago Wolves	AHL	64	9	4	13	83	5	0	0	0	2
2015–16	Chicago Wolves	AHL	72	8	15	23	79	—	—	—	—	—
2016–17	Brampton Beast	ECHL	11	3	8	11	31	—	—	—	—	—
2016–17	St. John's IceCaps	AHL	53	6	10	16	59	4	0	0	0	4
2017–18	Laval Rocket	AHL	52	3	4	7	78	—	—	—	—	—
2017–18	Brampton Beast	ECHL	3	0	3	3	4	—	—	—	—	—
2018–19	Rochester Americans	AHL	50	5	3	8	64	2	0	1	1	2
2019–20	Kalamazoo Wings	ECHL	22	6	13	19	30	—	—	—	—	—
2019–20	Laval Rocket	AHL	26	12	8	20	21	—	—	—	—	—
2020–21	Laval Rocket	AHL	26	14	5	19	62	—	—	—	—	—
2021–22	Eisbären Berlin	DEL	46	12	18	30	62	4	1	2	3	7
2022–23	Eisbären Berlin	DEL	40	10	8	18	42	—	—	—	—	—
2023–24	Eisbären Berlin	DEL	48	14	15	29	83	14	3	0	3	12
2024–25	Eisbären Berlin	DEL	46	8	18	26	73	14	3	10	13	17
AHL totals			355	59	51	110	451	11	0	1	1	8

=== International ===
Year	Team	Event	Result	GP	G	A	Pts	PIM
2010	Canada Quebec	U17	6th	5	1	3	4	6
Junior totals				5	1	3	4	6

== Awards and honours ==
Award	Year
DEL
Champion (Eisbären Berlin)	2022, 2024, 2025, 2026
