= Maximilian Franzreb =

German ice hockey player (born 1995)

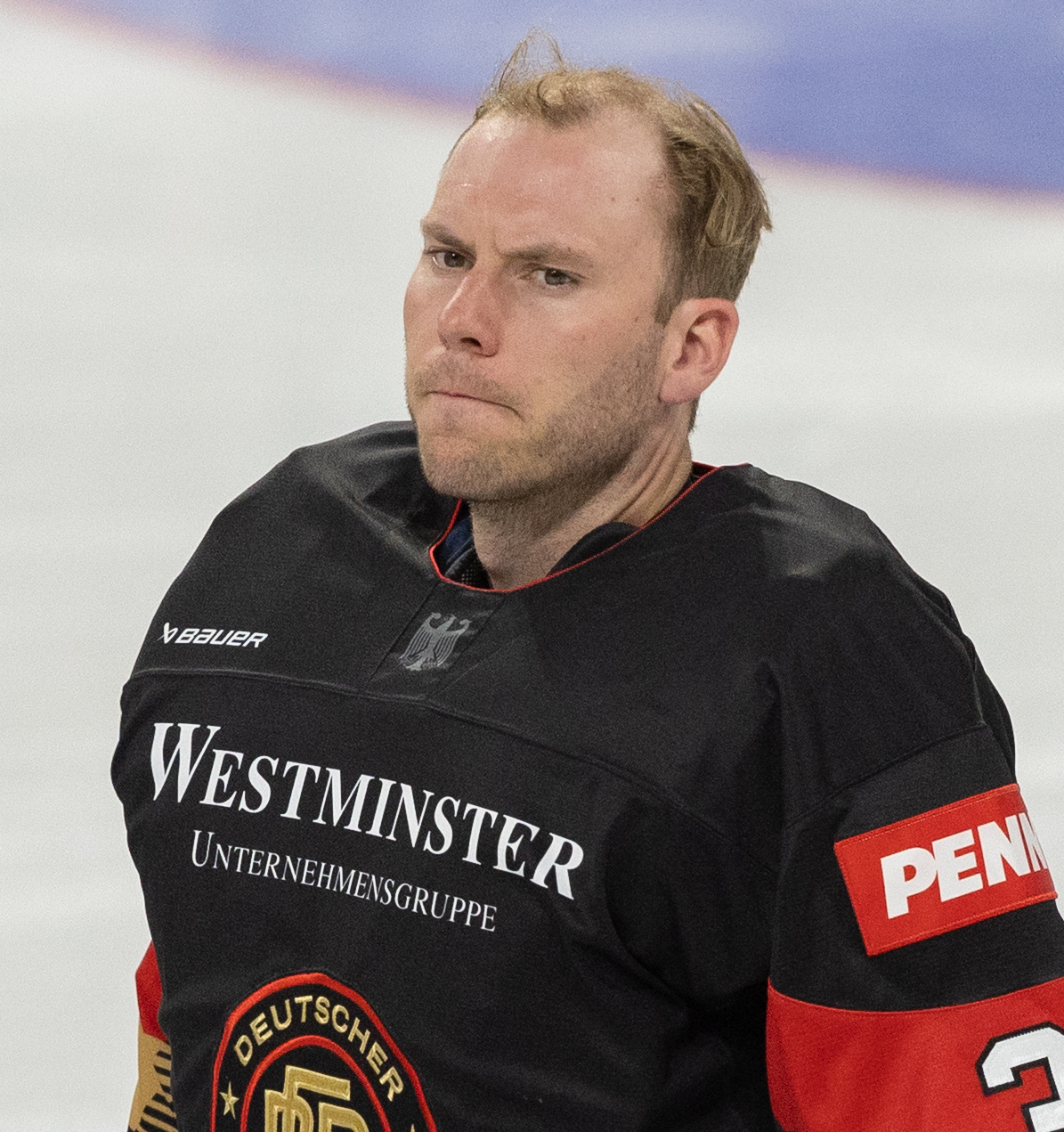
- Franzreb in 2026
- Born: 18 August 1996 (age 29) Bad Tölz, Germany
- Height: 1.84 m (6 ft 0 in)
- Weight: 90 kg (198 lb; 14 st 2 lb)
- Position: Goaltender
- Catches: Left
- DEL team Former teams: Adler Mannheim: Fischtown Pinguins; Eisbären Berlin
- National team: Germany
- Playing career: 2014–present

Maximilian Franzreb (born 18 August 1996) is a German professional ice hockey player who is a goaltender for Adler Mannheim of the Deutsche Eishockey Liga (DEL). Previously, Franzreb played for the Eisbären Berlin and Fischtown Pinguins in the DEL.

He competed at the 2026 Winter Olympics.
