= Jonas Müller (ice hockey) =

German ice hockey player (born 1995)

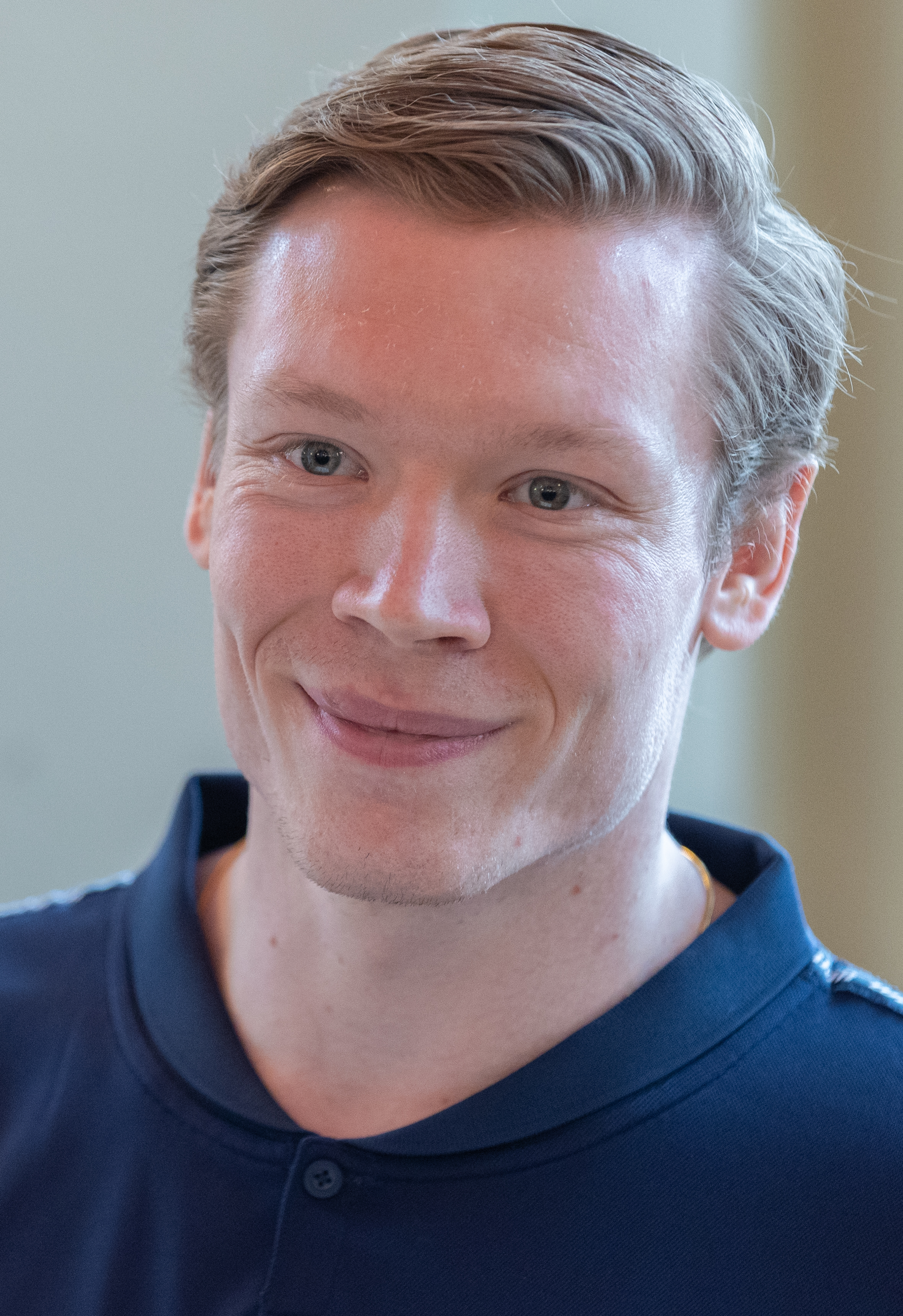
- Müller in 2026
- Born: 19 November 1995 (age 30) Berlin, Germany
- Height: 6 ft 0 in (183 cm)
- Weight: 187 lb (85 kg; 13 st 5 lb)
- Position: Defence
- Shoots: Left
- DEL team: Eisbären Berlin
- National team: Germany
- Playing career: 2013–present

Jonas Müller (born 19 November 1995) is a German professional ice hockey player who is a defenceman for Eisbären Berlin of the Deutsche Eishockey Liga (DEL). He competed for Germany in the 2018 Winter Olympics.

== Playing career ==
Müller started playing hockey at the age of six. He joined his hometown club, Eisbären Berlin, at the junior level, playing through each junior level before making his professional debut in the Deutsche Eishockey Liga in the 2013–14 season. On 3 May 2018, Müller was signed to a one-year contract extension to remain in Berlin.

== International play ==
Medal record

Representing Germany

Ice hockey

Olympic Games
Silver medal – second place	2018 Pyeongchang	

World Championships
Silver medal – second place	2023 Finland/Latvia	

Müller first appeared at an international tournament for Germany at the 2013 IIHF World U18 Championships.

Müller made his senior debut and was a member of the silver medal-winning 2018 German Olympic hockey team. He also represented Germany at the 2018 IIHF World Championship.

== Career statistics ==
=== Regular season and playoffs ===
			Regular season					Playoffs
Season	Team	League	GP	G	A	Pts	PIM	GP	G	A	Pts	PIM
2010–11	Eisbären Juniors Berlin	DNL	10	1	0	1	0	—	—	—	—	—
2011–12	Eisbären Juniors Berlin	DNL	23	0	3	3	8	9	0	0	0	0
2012–13	Eisbären Juniors Berlin	DNL	35	4	16	20	34	7	0	4	4	12
2012–13	FASS Berlin	3.GBun	4	0	0	0	0	—	—	—	—	—
2013–14	Eisbären Juniors Berlin	DNL	17	4	9	13	28	7	1	2	3	37
2013–14	FASS Berlin	3.GBun	25	5	10	15	36	—	—	—	—	—
2013–14	Eisbären Berlin	DEL	11	0	0	0	0	—	—	—	—	—
2014–15	Eisbären Berlin	DEL	27	1	6	7	12	3	0	0	0	0
2014–15	Dresdner Eislöwen	DEL2	20	1	4	5	10	5	0	0	0	10
2015–16	Eisbären Berlin	DEL	51	1	10	11	34	7	1	0	1	0
2016–17	Eisbären Berlin	DEL	29	2	7	9	18	14	1	2	3	14
2017–18	Eisbären Berlin	DEL	51	3	4	7	73	18	0	7	7	10
2018–19	Eisbären Berlin	DEL	37	5	5	10	34	8	0	0	0	10
2019–20	Eisbären Berlin	DEL	51	0	15	15	71	—	—	—	—	—
2020–21	Eisbären Berlin	DEL	37	7	8	15	32	9	0	2	2	4
2021–22	Eisbären Berlin	DEL	55	4	16	20	34	12	3	3	6	10
2022–23	Eisbären Berlin	DEL	54	5	9	14	29	—	—	—	—	—
2023–24	Eisbären Berlin	DEL	52	4	20	24	32	15	3	0	3	10
2024–25	Eisbären Berlin	DEL	52	4	24	28	46	13	1	9	10	10
DEL totals			507	36	124	160	415	99	9	23	32	68

=== International ===
Year	Team	Event	Result	GP	G	A	Pts	PIM
2013	Germany	WJC18	8th	5	0	1	1	4
2015	Germany	WJC	10th	6	0	0	0	2
2018	Germany	OG	2nd place, silver medalist(s)	5	1	0	1	2
2018	Germany	WC	11th	7	0	1	1	16
2019	Germany	WC	6th	6	0	1	1	2
2021	Germany	WC	4th	10	0	1	1	33
2022	Germany	OG	10th	4	0	1	1	0
2022	Germany	WC	7th	8	1	1	2	2
2023	Germany	WC	2nd place, silver medalist(s)	10	2	3	5	2
2024	Germany	WC	6th	8	1	3	4	6
2025	Germany	WC	9th	7	2	1	3	2
2026	Germany	OG	6th	5	0	0	0	4
Junior totals				11	0	1	1	6
Senior totals				70	7	12	19	69

== Awards and honors ==
Award	Year
DEL
Champion (Eisbären Berlin)	2021, 2022, 2024, 2025, 2026
