= 1993 Sweden Hockey Games =

Ice hockey competition in Stockholm

Tournament details
- Host country: Sweden
- City: Stockholm
- Venue: 1 (in 1 host city)
- Dates: 11 – 14 February 1993
- Teams: 4

Final positions
- Champions: Sweden (1st title)
- Runners-up: Czech Republic
- Third place: Russia
- Fourth place: Canada

Tournament statistics
- Games played: 6
- Goals scored: 52 (8.67 per game)
- Attendance: 47,260 (7,877 per game)
- Scoring leader: (Czech Republic) Antonín Stavjaňa (6 points)

The 1993 Sweden Hockey Games was played between 11 and 14 February 1993 in Stockholm, Sweden. The Czech Republic, Sweden, Russia and Canada played a round-robin for a total of three games per team and six games in total. All of the games were played in the Globen in Stockholm, Sweden. The tournament was won by Sweden.

== Standings ==
| Pos | Team | Pld | W | D | L | GF | GA | GD | Pts |
|---|---|---|---|---|---|---|---|---|---|
| 1 | Sweden | 3 | 2 | 0 | 1 | 14 | 8 | +6 | 6 |
| 2 | Czech Republic | 3 | 2 | 0 | 1 | 16 | 11 | +5 | 6 |
| 3 | Russia | 3 | 1 | 1 | 1 | 9 | 12 | −3 | 4 |
| 4 | Canada | 3 | 0 | 1 | 2 | 13 | 21 | −8 | 1 |

Source: swehockey

== Games ==
All times are local. Stockholm – (Central European Time – UTC+1)

| 11 February 1993 | Czech Republic | 6-1 (1–0, 2–0, 3–1) | Russia | Globen, Stockholm; Attendance: 2,129 |

Game reference

Roman Turek
Goalies
Sergei Mylnikov

| 19:14 – Kamil Kašťák (PP) | 1-0 |
| 34:01 – Kamil Kašťák (Tomáš Kucharčík, Martin Hosták) | 2-0 |
| 38:16 – Petr Hrbek (PP) | 3-0 |
| 49:07 – Luboš Rob (Martin Hosták, Roman Rysanek) | 4-0 |
| 49:28 – Petr Kořínek (David Bruk, Martin Prochazka) | 5-0 |
| | 5-1 | 54:06 – Andrei Nikolishin (Aleksandr Karpovtsev, Sergei Sorokin) |
| 55:59 – Roman Rysanek (Antonín Stavjaňa, Luboš Rob) | 6-1 |

10 min
Penalties
14 min
33
Shots
22

| 11 February 1993 | Sweden | 9-2 (3–1, 4–0, 2–1) | Canada | Globen, Stockholm; Attendance: 13,850 |

Game reference

Michael Sundlöv
Goalies
Tom Renney

| 06:10 – Peter Popovic (Lars Byström, Stefan Larsson) (PP) | 1-0 |
| | 1-1 | 08:34 – Derek Laxdal (Mark Astley) |
| 11:48 – Mikael Renberg | 2-1 |
| 14:11 – Stefan Nilsson (Arto Blomsten, Tomas Jonsson) (PP) | 3-1 |
| 22:51 – Håkan Åhlund (Fredrik Nilsson) | 4-1 |
| 24:18 – Stefan Nilsson (Patrik Juhlin) | 5-1 |
| 29:01 – Markus Näslund (Peter Forsberg) | 6-1 |
| 36:51 – Thomas Rundqvist (Kenneth Kennholt) | 7-1 |
| 46:36 – Nilsson (Lars Byström) | 8-1 |
| | 8-2 | 56:46 – Todd Hlushko (Mike Brewer, Derek Mayer) |
| 57:22 – Tomas Jonsson (Arto Blomsten) | 9-2 |

21 min
Penalties
16 min
48
Shots
39

| 12 February 1993 | Czech Republic | 2-3 (0–2, 0–0, 2–1) | Sweden | Globen, Stockholm; Attendance: 10,531 |

Game reference

Roman Turek
Goalies
Michael Sundlöv
Referee:
(Switzerland) Vincent Moreno

| | 0-1 | 04:47 – Jonas Bergqvist (Peter Forsberg) |
| | 0-2 | 11:49 – Jonas Bergqvist (Tomas Jonsson) (PP) |
| 42:47 – David Bruk (Petr Kořínek, Martin Prochazka) | 1-2 |
| 43:25 – Martin Hosták (Tomáš Kucharčík, Kamil Kašťák) | 2-2 |
| | 2-3 | 56:18 – Jonas Bergqvist (Peter Forsberg) |

4 min
Penalties
2 min
34
Shots
34

| 12 February 1993 | Canada | 4-4 (2–1, 1–2, 1–1) | Russia | Globen, Stockholm; Attendance: 3,729 |

Game reference

Tom Renney
Goalies
Sergei Mylnikov
Referee:
(Finland) Kari Nieminen

| | 0-1 | 01:52 – Sergei Zolotov (Alexei Kudashov) |
| | 0-2 | 06:02 – Sergei Zolotov (Andrei Potaichuk, Alexei Kudashov) |
| 15:57 – Dominic Amodeo (Mark Astley) | 1-2 |
| 26:30 – Jackson Penney (Todd Hlushko) | 2-2 |
| 27:36 – Mark Astley (Derek Laxdal) (PP) | 3-2 |
| | 3-3 | 34:49 – Yan Kaminsky (Sergei Sorokin, Alexei Yashin) |
| 45:50 – Tony Crisp (Serge Boisvert, Ken Lovsin) | 4-3 |
| | 4-4 | 47:40 – Denis Tsygurov (Alexander Barkov) |

6 min
Penalties
8 min
29
Shots
31

| 14 February 1993 | Czech Republic | 8-7 (1–1, 3–4, 4–2) | Canada | Globen, Stockholm; Attendance: 3,171 |

Game reference

Roman Turek
Goalies
Tom Renney

| 02:00 – David Výborný | 1-0 |
| | 1-1 | 18:00 – Serge Boisvert |
| | 1-2 | 21:00 – Serge Boisvert |
| 23:00 – Petr Kořínek | 2-2 |
| | 2-3 | 32:00 – Garth Premak |
| | 2-4 | 33:00 – Eric Bellerose |
| 34:00 – Martin Hosták | 3-4 |
| 37:00 – Antonín Stavjaňa | 4-4 |
| | 4-5 | 39:00 – Derek Laxdal |
| 41:00 – Martin Hosták | 5-5 |
| | 5-6 | 43:00 – Mike Brewer |
| 43:00 – David Bruk | 6-6 |
| | 6-7 | 47:00 – Jackson Penney |
| 49:00 – Roman Horák | 7-7 |
| 53:00 – Roman Horák | 8-7 |

6 min
Penalties
2 min
35
Shots
23

| 14 February 1993 | Sweden | 2-4 (0–1, 0–0, 2–3) | Russia | Globen, Stockholm; Attendance: 13,850 |

Game reference

Michael Sundlöv
Goalies
Sergei Mylnikov

| | 0-1 | 04:00 – Alexej Jasjin |
| | 0-2 | 41:00 – Denis Tsyganov |
| | 0-3 | 51:00 – Alexej Kudashov |
| 54:00 – Kenneth Kennholt | 1-3 |
| 56:00 – Stefan Nilsson | 2-3 |
| | 2-4 | 59:00 – Alexander Selivanov |

18 min
Penalties
25 min
35
Shots
23

== Scoring leaders ==
| Pos | Player | Country | GP | G | A | Pts | PIM | POS |
|---|---|---|---|---|---|---|---|---|
| 1 | Antonín Stavjaňa | Czech Republic | 3 | 1 | 5 | 6 | 0 | D |
| 2 | Domenic Amodeo | Canada | 3 | 1 | 4 | 5 | 0 | F |
| 3 | Stefan Nilsson | Sweden | 3 | 4 | 0 | 4 | 2 | F |
| 4 | Martin Hosták | Czech Republic | 3 | 3 | 1 | 4 | 0 | F |
| 5 | Kamil Kašťák | Czech Republic | 3 | 2 | 2 | 4 | 6 | F |

GP = Games played; G = Goals; A = Assists; Pts = Points; +/− = Plus/minus; PIM = Penalties in minutes; POS = Position
Source: quanthockey

== Tournament awards ==
The tournament directorate named the following players in the tournament 1993:

- Best goalkeeper: (Sweden) Michael Sundlöv
- Best defenceman: (Czech Republic) Antonín Stavjaňa
- Best forward: (Sweden) Peter Forsberg
