= 2011 World Junior Ice Hockey Championships rosters =

This page describes the rosters for the 2011 World Junior Ice Hockey Championships.

== Top Division ==
=== Group A ===
==== United States ====
- Head coach: (United States) Keith Allain

Pos.	No.	Player	Team	NHL Rights
GK	1	Jack Campbell	(Canada) Windsor Spitfires	Dallas Stars
GK	29	Andy Iles	(United States) Cornell University
D	4	Brian Dumoulin	(United States) Boston College	Carolina Hurricanes
D	5	John Ramage	(United States) University of Wisconsin	Calgary Flames
D	6	Nick Leddy	(United States) Rockford IceHogs	Chicago Blackhawks
D	7	Derek Forbort	(United States) University of North Dakota	Los Angeles Kings
D	12	Jon Merrill	(United States) University of Michigan	New Jersey Devils
D	18	Patrick Wey	(United States) Boston College	Washington Capitals
D	25	Justin Faulk	(United States) University of Minnesota Duluth	Carolina Hurricanes
F	3	Charlie Coyle	(United States) Boston University	San Jose Sharks
F	8	Brock Nelson	(United States) University of North Dakota	New York Islanders
F	9	Jerry D'Amigo	(Canada) Toronto Marlies	Toronto Maple Leafs
F	10	Chris Brown	(United States) University of Michigan	Phoenix Coyotes
F	11	Jeremy Morin	(United States) Rockford IceHogs	Chicago Blackhawks
F	15	Drew Shore	(United States) University of Denver	Florida Panthers
F	16	Jason Zucker	(United States) University of Denver	Minnesota Wild
F	17	Ryan Bourque	(Canada) Quebec Remparts	New York Rangers
F	19	Chris Kreider	(United States) Boston College	New York Rangers
F	23	Kyle Palmieri	(United States) Syracuse Crunch	Anaheim Ducks
F	24	Mitch Callahan	(Canada) Kelowna Rockets	Detroit Red Wings
F	26	Emerson Etem	(Canada) Medicine Hat Tigers	Anaheim Ducks
F	27	Nick Bjugstad	(United States) University of Minnesota	Florida Panthers

==== Switzerland ====
- Head coach: (Switzerland) Richard Jost

Pos.	No.	Player	Team	NHL Rights
GK	1	Benjamin Conz	(Switzerland) SCL Tigers
GK	20	Remo Giovannini	(Switzerland) HC Davos
D	5	Romain Loeffel	(Switzerland) Fribourg-Gottéron
D	6	Nicholas Steiner	(Switzerland) Kloten Flyers
D	7	Luca Camperchioli	(Switzerland) ZSC Lions
D	8	Dominik Schlumpf	(Canada) Shawinigan Cataractes
D	17	Dario Trutmann	(United States) Plymouth Whalers
D	28	Samuel Guerra	(Switzerland) HC Davos
D	32	Ramon Untersander	(Switzerland) HC Davos
F	9	Reto Schappi	(Switzerland) GCK Lions
F	10	Tristan Scherwey	(Switzerland) SC Bern
F	11	Gaëtan Haas	(Switzerland) EHC Biel
F	13	Gregory Hofmann	(Switzerland) HC Ambrì-Piotta	sven
F	15	Sven Bärtschi	(United States) Portland Winterhawks
F	16	Inti Pestoni	(Switzerland) HC Ambri-Piotta
F	19	Ryan McGregor	(Switzerland) GCK Lions
F	21	Renato Engler	(Switzerland) HC Davos
F	22	Nino Niederreiter	(United States) Portland Winterhawks	New York Islanders
F	23	Benjamin Antonietti	(Switzerland) Genève-Servette HC
F	24	Samuel Walser	(Switzerland) Kloten Flyers
F	26	Joël Vermin	(Switzerland) SC Bern
F	27	Yannick Herren	(Switzerland) Kloten Flyers

==== Finland ====
- Head coach: (Finland) Lauri Marjamäki

Pos.	No.	Player	Team	NHL Rights
GK	30	Sami Aittokallio	(Finland) Ilves	Colorado Avalanche
GK	31	Joni Ortio	(Finland) TPS Turku	Calgary Flames
D	3	Jyrki Jokipakka	(Finland) Ilves
D	4	Tommi Kivistö	(Finland) Jokerit	Carolina Hurricanes
D	5	Nico Manelius	(Finland) Jokerit
D	8	Rasmus Rissanen	(United States) Everett Silvertips	Carolina Hurricanes
D	9	Sami Vatanen	(Finland) JYP	Anaheim Ducks
D	15	Olli Määttä	(Finland) JYP
D	23	Jesse Virtanen	(Finland) Lukko
F	6	Teemu Pulkkinen	(Finland) Jokerit	Detroit Red Wings
F	10	Erik Haula	(United States) University of Minnesota	Minnesota Wild
F	11	Miikka Salomäki	(Finland) Oulun Kärpät
F	13	Julius Junttila	(Finland) Oulun Kärpät
F	16	Henri Tuominen	(Finland) Ilves
F	18	Iiro Pakarinen	(Finland) KalPa
F	20	Joel Armia	(Finland) Ässät
F	21	Valtteri Virkkunen	(Finland) Espoo Blues
F	24	Teemu Tallberg	(Finland) HIFK
F	25	Toni Rajala	(Finland) Ilves	Edmonton Oilers
F	27	Joonas Donskoi	(Finland) Oulun Kärpät	Florida Panthers
F	28	Jaakko Turtiainen	(Finland) HPK
F	29	Joonas Nättinen	(Finland) Espoo Blues	Montreal Canadiens

==== Slovakia ====
- Head coach: (Slovakia) Štefan Mikeš

Pos.	No.	Player	Team	NHL Rights
GK	1	Juraj Hollý	(Canada) Calgary Hitmen
GK	2	Tomáš Pék	(Slovakia) HC Slovan Bratislava
GK	30	Dominik Riečický	(Slovakia) HC Košice
D	3	Adam Jánošík	(Canada) Gatineau Olympiques	Tampa Bay Lightning
D	5	Lukáš Kozák	(Slovakia) MHC Martin
D	7	Peter Trška	(Slovakia) Slovan Bratislava
D	16	Peter Hraško	(Slovakia) HKm Zvolen
D	21	Martin Marinčin	(Canada) Prince George Cougars	Edmonton Oilers
D	24	Henrich Jaborník	(Slovakia) HK 36 Skalica
D	26	Peter Čerešňák	(Slovakia) HC Dukla Trenčín
F	8	Peter Šišovský	(Slovakia) MHC Martin
F	9	Juraj Majdan	(Czech Republic) HC Litvínov
F	11	Oliver Jokeľ	(Slovakia) HC Košice
F	13	Tomáš Jurčo	(Canada) Saint John Sea Dogs
F	17	Andrej Šťastný	(Slovakia) HC Dukla Trenčín
F	18	Dominik Šimčák	(Slovakia) HC Košice
F	19	Dalibor Bortňák	(Canada) Kamloops Blazers
F	20	Michael Vandas	(Slovakia) HK ŠKP Poprad
F	22	Tomáš Matoušek	(Slovakia) HC ’05 Banská Bystrica
F	23	Andrej Kudrna	(Canada) Red Deer Rebels
F	27	Marek Hrivík	(Canada) Moncton Wildcats
F	28	Richard Pánik	(Canada) Guelph Storm	Tampa Bay Lightning
F	29	Miroslav Preisinger	(Slovakia) HC Slovan Bratislava

==== Germany ====
- Head coach: (Germany) Ernst Höfner

Pos.	No.	Player	Team	NHL Rights
GK	1	Niklas Treutle	(Germany) Hamburg Freezers
GK	30	Philipp Grubauer	(Canada) Kingston Frontenacs	Washington Capitals
D	3	Peter Lindlbauer	(Germany) EC Bad Tölz
D	5	Benjamin Hüfner	(Germany) Dresdner Eislöwen
D	6	Konrad Abeltshauser	(Canada) Halifax Mooseheads	San Jose Sharks
D	7	Dominik Bittner	(Germany) Heilbronner Falken
D	9	Corey Mapes	(Germany) Heilbronner Falken
D	12	Jannik Woidtke	(Germany) DEG Metro Stars
D	23	Dieter Orendorz	(Germany) Iserlohn Roosters
F	10	Norman Hauner	(Germany) Kölner Haie
F	11	Thomas Brandl	(Germany) Landshut Cannibals
F	14	Tom Kühnhackl	(Canada) Windsor Spitfires	Pittsburgh Penguins
F	15	Marcel Noebels	(United States) Seattle Thunderbirds
F	16	Tobias Rieder	(Canada) Kitchener Rangers
F	18	Laurin Braun	(Germany) Eisbären Berlin
F	19	Mirko Höfflin	(Canada) Quebec Remparts	Chicago Blackhawks
F	20	Marcel Ohmann	(Germany) Kölner Haie
F	21	Marc El-Sayed	(Germany) Adler Mannheim
F	22	Matthias Plachta	(Germany) Adler Mannheim
F	26	Bernhard Keil	(Canada) Kamloops Blazers
F	28	Marius Möchel	(Germany) Starbulls Rosenheim

=== Group B ===
==== Canada ====
- Head coach: (Canada) Dave Cameron

Pos.	No.	Player	Team	NHL Rights
GK	30	Mark Visentin	(Canada) Niagara Ice Dogs	Phoenix Coyotes
GK	31	Olivier Roy	(Canada) Acadie–Bathurst Titan	Edmonton Oilers
D	2	Jared Cowen	(United States) Spokane Chiefs	Ottawa Senators
D	3	Simon Després	(Canada) Saint John Sea Dogs	Pittsburgh Penguins
D	4	Dylan Olsen	(United States) University of Minnesota-Duluth	Chicago Blackhawks
D	5	Erik Gudbranson	(Canada) Kingston Frontenacs	Florida Panthers
D	6	Ryan Ellis	(Canada) Windsor Spitfires	Nashville Predators
D	22	Tyson Barrie	(Canada) Kelowna Rockets	Colorado Avalanche
D	24	Calvin de Haan	(Canada) Oshawa Generals	New York Islanders
F	7	Sean Couturier	(Canada) Drummondville Voltigeurs
F	8	Jaden Schwartz	(United States) Colorado College	St. Louis Blues
F	9	Zack Kassian	(Canada) Windsor Spitfires	Buffalo Sabres
F	10	Brayden Schenn	(Canada) Brandon Wheat Kings	Los Angeles Kings
F	11	Casey Cizikas	(Canada) Mississauga St. Michael's Majors	New York Islanders
F	12	Quinton Howden	(Canada) Moose Jaw Warriors	Florida Panthers
F	16	Curtis Hamilton	(Canada) Saskatoon Blades	Edmonton Oilers
F	17	Marcus Foligno	(Canada) Sudbury Wolves	Buffalo Sabres
F	19	Ryan Johansen	(United States) Portland Winterhawks	Columbus Blue Jackets
F	20	Louis Leblanc	(Canada) Montreal Junior Hockey Club	Montreal Canadiens
F	21	Cody Eakin	(Canada) Swift Current Broncos	Washington Capitals
F	25	Carter Ashton	(United States) Tri-City Americans	Tampa Bay Lightning
F	28	Brett Connolly	(Canada) Prince George Cougars	Tampa Bay Lightning

==== Sweden ====
- Head coach: (Sweden) Roger Rönnberg

Pos.	No.	Player	Team	NHL Rights
GK	1	Fredrik Pettersson-Wentzel	(Sweden) Almtuna IS	Atlanta Thrashers
GK	30	Robin Lehner	(United States) Binghamton Senators	Ottawa Senators
D	2	Fredrik Styrman	(Sweden) Luleå HF
D	4	Tim Erixon	(Sweden) Skellefteå AIK	Calgary Flames
D	5	Adam Larsson	(Sweden) Skellefteå AIK
D	6	Klas Dahlbeck	(Sweden) Linköpings HC
D	9	John Klingberg	(Sweden) Frölunda HC	Dallas Stars
D	12	Patrik Nemeth	(Sweden) AIK IF	Dallas Stars
D	15	Simon Bertilsson	(Sweden) Brynäs IF	Philadelphia Flyers
F	10	Johan Larsson	(Sweden) Brynäs IF	Minnesota Wild
F	13	Johan Sundström	(Sweden) Frölunda HC
F	14	Max Friberg	(Sweden) Skövde IK
F	16	Anton Lander	(Sweden) Timrå IK	Edmonton Oilers
F	17	Carl Klingberg	(Sweden) Frölunda HC	Atlanta Thrashers
F	18	Jesper Fasth	(Sweden) HV71	New York Rangers
F	19	Calle Järnkrok	(Sweden) Brynäs IF	Detroit Red Wings
F	20	Sebastian Wännström	(Sweden) Brynäs IF	St. Louis Blues
F	22	Gabriel Landeskog	(Canada) Kitchener Rangers
F	24	Oscar Lindberg	(Sweden) Skellefteå AIK	Phoenix Coyotes
F	27	Rickard Rakell	(United States) Plymouth Whalers
F	28	Jesper Thörnberg	(Sweden) HV71
F	29	Patrick Cehlin	(Sweden) Djurgårdens IF	Nashville Predators

==== Russia ====
- Head coach: (Russia) Valeri Bragin

Pos.	No.	Player	Team	NHL Rights
GK	20	Dmitri Shikin	(Russia) SKA Saint Petersburg
GK	30	Igor Bobkov	(Canada) London Knights	Anaheim Ducks
D	2	Nikita Zaitsev	(Russia) Sibir Novosibirsk
D	3	Nikita Pivtsakin	(Russia) Avangard Omsk
D	5	Maxim Berezin	(Russia) Neftekhimik Nizhnekamsk
D	6	Georgi Berdyukov	(Russia) SKA Saint Petersburg
D	9	Dmitri Orlov	(Russia) Metallurg Novokuznetsk	Washington Capitals
D	12	Yuri Urychev	(Russia) Lokomotiv Yaroslavl
D	23	Maxim Ignatovich	(Russia) Sibir Novosibirsk
D	26	Andrei Sergeyev	(Russia) Neftekhimik Nizhnekamsk
F	7	Anton Burdasov	(Russia) Traktor Chelyabinsk
F	8	Semyon Valuiski	(Russia) Torpedo Nizhny Novgorod
F	10	Vladimir Tarasenko	(Russia) Sibir Novosibirsk	St. Louis Blues
F	13	Maxim Kitsyn	(Russia) Metallurg Novokuznetsk	Los Angeles Kings
F	14	Daniil Sobchenko	(Russia) Lokomotiv Yaroslavl
F	15	Artyom Voronin	(Russia) Spartak Moscow
F	17	Nikita Dvurechenski	(Russia) UHC Dynamo
F	18	Stanislav Bocharov	(Russia) Ak Bars Kazan
F	21	Sergei Kalinin	(Russia) Avangard Omsk
F	25	Evgeny Kuznetsov	(Russia) Traktor Chelyabinsk	Washington Capitals
F	27	Artemi Panarin	(Russia) Vityaz Chekhov
F	28	Denis Golubev	(Russia) Ak Bars Kazan

==== Czech Republic ====
- Head coach: (Czech Republic) Miroslav Prerost

Pos.	No.	Player	Team	NHL Rights
GK	1	Filip Novotný	(Czech Republic) Sparta Praha
GK	2	Marek Mazanec	(Czech Republic) HC Plzeň
D	4	Oldřich Horák	(Czech Republic) VCES Hradec Králové
D	7	Dalibor Řezníček	(Czech Republic) PSG Zlín
D	9	Petr Šenkeřík	(Czech Republic) Havlickuv Brod
D	12	Jakub Jeřábek	(Czech Republic) HC Plzeň
D	15	Martin Pláněk	(Czech Republic) Orli Znojmo
D	24	Adam Sedlák	(Canada) Ottawa 67's	Los Angeles Kings
D	28	Bohumil Jank	(Czech Republic) HC Mountfield
F	5	Martin Frk	(Canada) Halifax Mooseheads
F	8	Michal Hlinka	(Czech Republic) HC Vítkovice Steel
F	10	Tomáš Rachůnek	(Czech Republic) Orli Znojmo
F	11	Andrej Nestrasil	(Canada) P.E.I. Rocket	Detroit Red Wings
F	14	Jakub Culek	(United States) Binghamton Senators	Ottawa Senators
F	17	Petr Holík	(Czech Republic) PSG Zlín
F	18	Ondřej Palát	(Canada) Drummondville Voltigeurs
F	19	Antonín Honejsek	(Canada) Moose Jaw Warriors	Atlanta Thrashers
F	21	Petr Straka	(Canada) Rimouski Océanic	Columbus Blue Jackets
F	23	Roman Horák	(Canada) Chilliwack Bruins	New York Rangers
F	25	Robin Soudek	(Canada) Chilliwack Bruins
F	26	David Tůma	(Czech Republic) Sparta Praha
F	27	Jakub Orsava	(Czech Republic) Oceláři Třinec

==== Norway ====
- Head coach: (Norway) Geir Hoff

Pos.	No.	Player	Team	NHL Rights
GK	1	Steffen Søberg	(Norway) Manglerud Star Ishockey
GK	25	Lars Volden	(Finland) Espoo Blues
D	3	Nicolai Bryhnisveen	(Norway) Lørenskog IK
D	5	Tobias Skaarberg	(Norway) Sparta Warriors
D	6	Jens Ulrik Bacher	(Norway) Frisk Tigers
D	7	Kenneth Madsø	(Norway) Lillehammer IK
D	8	Adrian Danielsen	(Norway) Storhamar Dragons
D	27	Daniel Rokseth	(Norway) Manglerud Star Ishockey
D	29	Robin Andersen	(Norway) Stjernen Hockey
F	9	Andreas Stene	(Canada) Kelowna Rockets
F	10	Magnus Lindahl	(Norway) Frisk Tigers
F	11	Petter Røste Fossen	(Norway) Rosenborg IHK
F	12	Rasmus Juell	(United States) Cedar Rapids RoughRiders
F	13	Sondre Olden	(Sweden) Modo Hockey	Toronto Maple Leafs
F	14	Eirik Børresen	(Norway) Storhamar Dragons
F	15	Michael Haga	(Sweden) Luleå HF
F	18	Nicholas Weberg	(United States) Shattuck-Saint Mary's
F	19	Jonas Oppøyen	(Norway) Vålerenga Ishockey
F	21	Mats Rosseli Olsen	(Norway) Vålerenga Ishockey
F	22	Hans Kristian Hollstedt	(Norway) Stjernen Hockey
F	24	Joacim Sundelius	(Norway) Manglerud Star Ishockey
F	28	Simen Brekke	(Norway) Vålerenga Ishockey
