= Roman Horák =

Roman Horák may refer to:

- Roman Horák (ice hockey, born 1969), Czech ice hockey player who played 14 seasons in the European Elite leagues
- Roman Horák (ice hockey, born 1991), Czech ice hockey player who played in the NHL and plays for Sparta Praha (as of 2025)

== See also ==
- Horak (surname)
