= Horák =

Horák (feminine: Horáková) is a Czech and Slovak surname, one of the most common Czech surnames. The word horák (derived from the Czech and Slovak word hora, i.e. 'mountain') referred to a person who came from the mountains or hilly region. Notable people with the surname include:

== Sports ==
- Eva Horáková (born 1972), Czech basketball player
- Hana Horáková (born 1979), Czech basketball player
- Jana Horáková (born 1983), Czech cyclist
- Martin Horák (born 1980), Czech footballer
- Michael Horak (born 1977), South African rugby player
- Oldřich Horák (born 1991), Czech ice hockey player
- Peter Horák (born 1983), Slovak high jumper
- Petr Horák (born 1991), Czech snowboarder
- Robert Horák (born 1982), Czech ice hockey player
- Roman Horák (ice hockey, born 1969), Czech ice hockey player
- Roman Horák (ice hockey, born 1991), Czech ice hockey player
- Tomáš Horák (sprinter) (born 2008), Czech sprinter
- Václav Horák (1912–2000), Czech footballer
- Walter Horak (1931–2019), Austrian footballer

== Other ==
- Bruce Horak (born 1974), Canadian artist and actor
- Jiří Horák (1924–2003), Czech politician
- Josef Horák (1931–2005), Czech bass clarinetist
- Katarína Horáková, Slovak biologist
- Marianne Horak (born 1944), Swiss-Austrian entomologist
- Milada Horáková (1901–1950), Czech politician executed by communists
- Olga Horak (1926–2024) Slovak-Australian writer and Holocaust survivor
- Slávek Horák (born 1975), Czech film director and screenwriter
- Václav Emanuel Horák (1800–1871), Czech composer
- Yaroslav Horak (1927–2020), Australian comics artist
