= Brandon Pirri =

Canadian ice hockey player (born 1991)

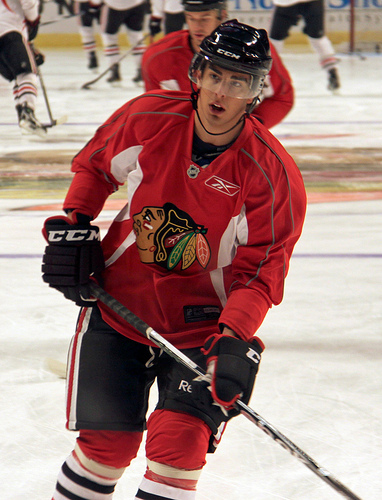
- Pirri with the Chicago Blackhawks in 2010
- Born: April 10, 1991 (age 35) Toronto, Ontario, Canada
- Height: 6 ft 0 in (183 cm)
- Weight: 183 lb (83 kg; 13 st 1 lb)
- Position: Centre
- Shot: Left
- Played for: Chicago Blackhawks; Florida Panthers; Anaheim Ducks; New York Rangers; Vegas Golden Knights
- National team: Canada
- NHL draft: 59th overall, 2009; Chicago Blackhawks
- Playing career: 2010–2022

Brandon Pirri (born April 10, 1991) is a Canadian former professional ice hockey centre. He was selected by the Chicago Blackhawks in the second round (59th overall) of the 2009 NHL entry draft. Pirri also played for the Florida Panthers, Anaheim Ducks, and Vegas Golden Knights.

== Playing career ==
Pirri committed to a collegiate career with RPI Engineers in the ECAC. He was invited to take part in Canada's 2011 national junior team selection camp, but was not included on the final roster. Following his successful freshman season, Pirri left RPI to embark on a professional career with the Rockford IceHogs of the American Hockey League (AHL), after signing a three-year, entry-level contract as an undrafted free agent with the Chicago Blackhawks.

Pirri was recalled by the Blackhawks after the 2012–13 NHL lockout ended. During the 2013–14 season, on March 2, 2014, Pirri was traded by the Blackhawks to the Florida Panthers for a 2014 third-round pick and a 2016 fifth-round pick.

In the 2015–16 season, Pirri scored 11 goals in 52 games before he was traded by the Panthers to the Anaheim Ducks in exchange for a 6th-round pick on February 29, 2016.

As a free agent in the offseason from the Ducks, Pirri belatedly signed a one-year $1.1 million contract with the New York Rangers on August 25, 2016.

On July 17, 2017, Pirri was reportedly signed to a one-year contract by the ZSC Lions of the National League (NL). However, with an announcement never materialising he remained a free agent, later accepting an invitation to return to his former club, the Florida Panthers, on a professional try-out contract on August 29, 2017. After competing in training camp and pre-season, Pirri was unable to earn a contract with the Panthers and was released on October 1, 2017. Three days later he agreed to a one-year deal for the 2017–18 season with the Vegas Golden Knights. On April 3, 2018, Pirri was called up to the NHL. Pirri scored two goals on three shots in a shootout victory over the Vancouver Canucks, earning his 100th career NHL point.

On September 28, 2020, the Blackhawks reacquired Pirri from the Golden Knights in exchange for Dylan Sikura. He played out the following two seasons within the Blackhawks organization before ending his 12-year professional career.

== Career statistics ==
=== Regular season and playoffs ===
			Regular season					Playoffs
Season	Team	League	GP	G	A	Pts	PIM	GP	G	A	Pts	PIM
2007–08	Streetsville Derbys	OPJHL	40	18	32	50	42	—	—	—	—	—
2008–09	Streetsville Derbys	OJHL	18	21	28	49	24	—	—	—	—	—
2008–09	Georgetown Raiders	OJHL	26	25	20	45	22	14	8	13	21	10
2009–10	RPI Engineers	ECAC	39	11	32	43	67	—	—	—	—	—
2010–11	Chicago Blackhawks	NHL	1	0	0	0	0	—	—	—	—	—
2010–11	Rockford IceHogs	AHL	70	12	31	43	50	—	—	—	—	—
2011–12	Chicago Blackhawks	NHL	5	0	2	2	0	—	—	—	—	—
2011–12	Rockford IceHogs	AHL	66	23	33	56	36	—	—	—	—	—
2012–13	Rockford IceHogs	AHL	76	22	53	75	72	—	—	—	—	—
2012–13	Chicago Blackhawks	NHL	1	0	0	0	0	—	—	—	—	—
2013–14	Rockford IceHogs	AHL	26	11	15	26	10	—	—	—	—	—
2013–14	Chicago Blackhawks	NHL	28	6	5	11	6	—	—	—	—	—
2013–14	Florida Panthers	NHL	21	7	7	14	2	—	—	—	—	—
2014–15	Florida Panthers	NHL	49	22	2	24	14	—	—	—	—	—
2015–16	Florida Panthers	NHL	52	11	13	24	30	—	—	—	—	—
2015–16	Anaheim Ducks	NHL	9	3	2	5	0	—	—	—	—	—
2016–17	New York Rangers	NHL	60	8	10	18	25	—	—	—	—	—
2017–18	Chicago Wolves	AHL	57	29	23	52	28	3	0	0	0	2
2017–18	Vegas Golden Knights	NHL	2	3	0	3	0	—	—	—	—	—
2018–19	Chicago Wolves	AHL	29	18	24	42	37	—	—	—	—	—
2018–19	Vegas Golden Knights	NHL	31	12	6	18	6	1	0	0	0	0
2019–20	Vegas Golden Knights	NHL	16	0	2	2	8	—	—	—	—	—
2019–20	Chicago Wolves	AHL	38	15	20	35	30	—	—	—	—	—
2020–21	Chicago Blackhawks	NHL	1	0	0	0	0	—	—	—	—	—
2020–21	Rockford IceHogs	AHL	7	8	2	10	0	—	—	—	—	—
2021–22	Rockford IceHogs	AHL	3	3	1	4	0	—	—	—	—	—
NHL totals			276	72	49	121	91	1	0	0	0	0

Medal record

Ice hockey

Representing Canada

World Championships
Gold medal – first place	2021 Latvia	

Representing Canada East

World Junior A Challenge
Bronze medal – third place	2008 Camrose	

=== International ===
Year	Team	Event	Result	GP	G	A	Pts	PIM
2021	Canada	WC	1st place, gold medalist(s)	10	3	0	3	6
Senior totals				10	3	0	3	6

== Awards and honors ==
Award	Year
College
All-ECAC Hockey Rookie Team	2009–10
