= Zack Kassian =

Canadian ice hockey player (born 1991)

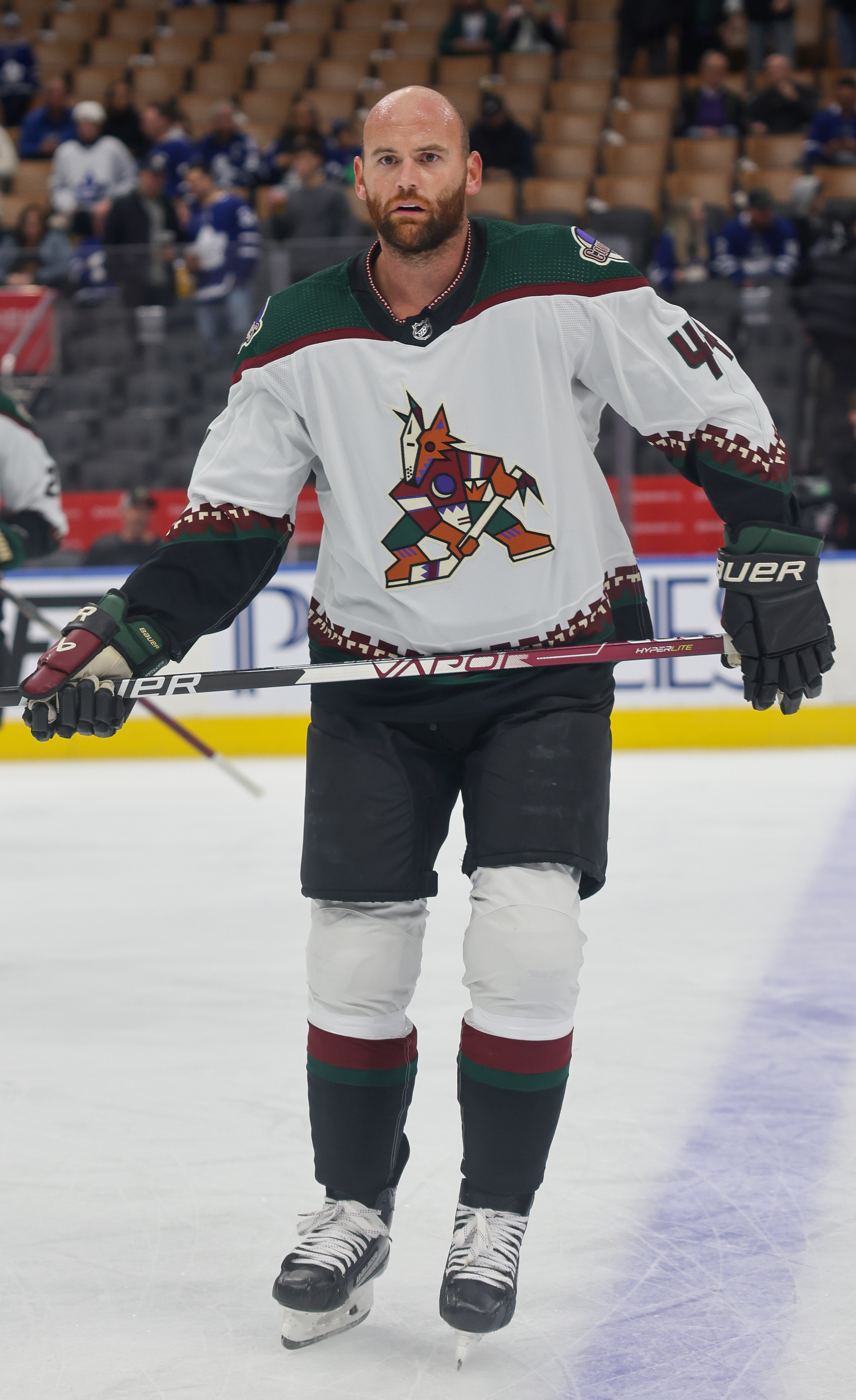
- Kassian with the Arizona Coyotes in 2022
- Born: January 24, 1991 (age 35) Windsor, Ontario, Canada
- Height: 6 ft 3 in (191 cm)
- Weight: 211 lb (96 kg; 15 st 1 lb)
- Position: Right wing
- Shot: Right
- Played for: Buffalo Sabres; Vancouver Canucks; Edmonton Oilers; Arizona Coyotes; HC Sparta Praha
- NHL draft: 13th overall, 2009; Buffalo Sabres
- Playing career: 2011–2024

Zack Adam Kassian (born January 24, 1991) is a Canadian former professional ice hockey winger. He most recently played for HC Sparta Praha in the Czech Extraliga. During his major junior career, he won a Memorial Cup with the Windsor Spitfires of the Ontario Hockey League (OHL) in 2010. Selected in the first round, 13th overall, by the Buffalo Sabres of the National Hockey League (NHL) in the 2009 NHL entry draft, Kassian began his career within the Sabres organization before being traded to the Vancouver Canucks in 2012. He played parts of four seasons with the Canucks before being dealt to the Montreal Canadiens in 2015. Kassian never played for the Canadiens, however, as he was suspended for substance abuse issues, and was moved to the Edmonton Oilers several months later. After seven seasons in Edmonton, Kassian was traded yet again to the Arizona Coyotes, spending one season there before retiring from NHL play during the 2023–24 season.

Internationally, he competed with Canada's under-20 team at the 2011 World Junior Championships and won a silver medal. Listed at 6 ft 3 in (191 cm) and 211 lb (96 kg), Kassian played in the style of a power forward and was known for playing with aggression and physicality.

== Early life ==
Kassian was born in Windsor, Ontario, to parents Mike and Shirley Kassian. Though often mistaken for having Armenian heritage, Kassian is not of Armenian descent. He has two older sisters and an older brother, Mike Jr. When he was eight, his father died of a heart attack. Kassian has recalled his father's role as having been filled by Mike Jr., who was nineteen at the time, while he grew up. He grew up attending Queen of Peace elementary school in Leamington, Ontario and first began playing organized hockey at the age of eight with the Kingsville Kings. Growing up, he was a Toronto Maple Leafs fan, though he has listed his favourite players as Boston Bruins defenceman Bobby Orr and Todd Bertuzzi, a fellow power forward who was starring with the Vancouver Canucks during Kassian's youth.

== Playing career ==
=== Junior ===
After a season of AAA midget with the Windsor Jr. Spitfires, Kassian debuted at the major junior level with the Peterborough Petes in 2007–08. Playing in his first career OHL game, he recorded two assists against the Sudbury Wolves on September 20, 2007. He scored his first OHL goal the following month against the Erie Otters on October 11. He went on to score 9 goals and 21 points over 58 games as a rookie. In the following season, he improved to 24 goals and 63 points over 61 games. He also had a team-leading 136 penalty minutes and earned a reputation as a willing fighter with 13 fighting majors. That season, he was chosen to play in three All-Star exhibitions. Near the beginning of the campaign, he represented Team OHL in two games against a select team of Russian juniors, as part of the annual Subway Super Series. Kassian later dressed for the Eastern Conference in the OHL All-Star Classic and scored a goal and an assist. Lastly, he competed in the 2009 CHL Top Prospects Game for Team Cherry, a contest in which he injured John Tavares with a hit.

Leading up to the 2009 NHL entry draft, Kassian was ranked 10th among eligible prospects playing in North America (not including goaltenders) by the NHL Central Scouting Bureau (CSB). Chris Edwards of the CSB heralded him as "one of the toughest guys in the OHL and probably the entire draft", while also highlighting his "play-making and puck-handling abilities". Scouted as a power forward, he was compared to such players as Milan Lucic, as well as retired NHL All-Stars Cam Neely and Keith Tkachuk. Kassian went on to be selected in the first round, 13th overall, by the Buffalo Sabres in the draft.

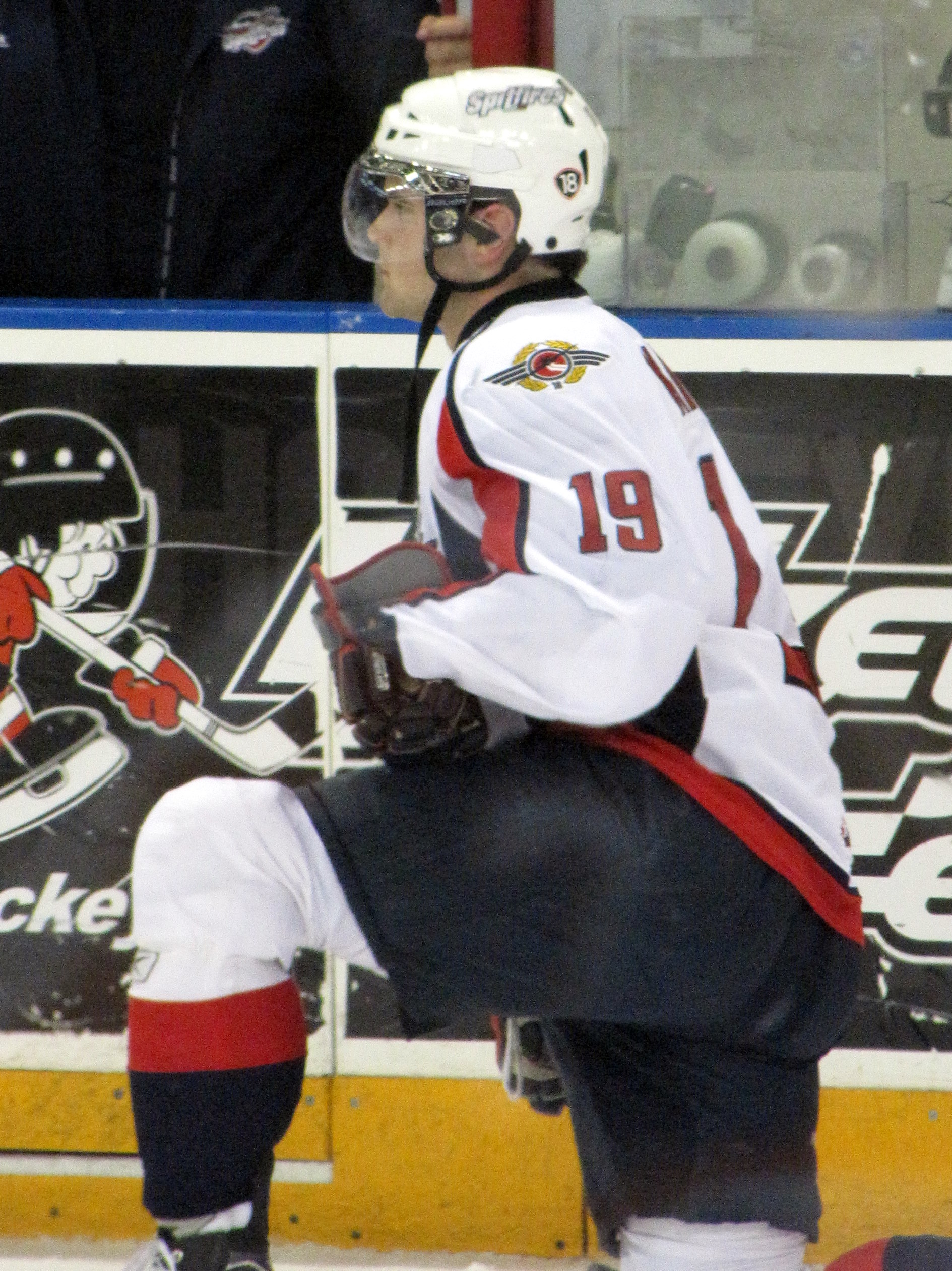
Kassian with the Spitfires in April 2010

Kassian went on to attend his first NHL training camp in September 2009 and was returned to Peterborough to continue at the junior level. Back with the Petes, Kassian was chosen to replace the departed Zach Harnden as team captain after Harnden starting playing with the Kingston Frontenacs. Thirty-three games into his 2009–10 OHL season, Kassian was traded to the Windsor Spitfires. Before the trade, Kassian had been suspended one game by his team for breaking curfew. Shortly after joining Windsor, he was given a 20-game suspension from the league for his hit to the head of Barrie Colts forward Matt Kennedy during a game in January 2010. Limited to 38 games between Peterborough and Windsor due to the ban, Kassian totalled 12 goals and 31 points. Returning from the suspension in time for the 2010 playoffs, he added 7 goals and 16 points over 19 games to help Windsor to a J. Ross Robertson Cup as OHL champions. The win qualified Windsor for the 2010 Memorial Cup, Canada's national major junior championship, which they won as well. Defeating the Brandon Wheat Kings in the final 9–1, Kassian had a goal and an assist in the championship-winning game.

Following the Memorial Cup win, Kassian was arrested after an altercation at a bar in Downtown Windsor on May 30, 2010. Charged with assault, he reached an agreement several months later, in October 2010. The charge was dropped in exchange for 25 hours of community service, a $500 donation to charity, and payment for the victim's dental work. Had he been convicted, Kassian would have been ineligible to cross the border into the United States, (Note: Even without being charged, it would have been possible for Canadian authorities to prevent him from doing so, as part of the judicial process. A border crossing ban could also have been mitigated through the Department of State, however.) which would have conflicted with his hockey career.

Kassian returned to the Sabres' training camp in September 2010. While he was sent back to junior for the second straight year, he remained on the team's pre-season roster as one of the final cuts in October. A month after being returned to Windsor, he signed a three-year, entry-level contract with the Sabres on November 2, 2010. Playing his first full season with Windsor, Kassian recorded a junior career-high 26 goals and 77 points over 56 games. His points total ranked second in team scoring, behind captain Ryan Ellis' 100. He then added 16 points (6 goals and 10 assists) over 16 OHL playoff games, tying for fifth in team scoring. During Game 4 of the Conference Finals against the Owen Sound Attack, Kassian received a match penalty for a hit on opposing defenceman Jesse Blacker, which was ruled as "intent to injure". Following the contest, the penalty was supplemented with an additional three-game suspension, sidelining him for the remainder of the series. Out of the lineup for Game 5, he only needed to serve half of the total suspension as the Attack eliminated the Spitfires four-games-to-one.

=== National Hockey League ===
==== Buffalo Sabres ====
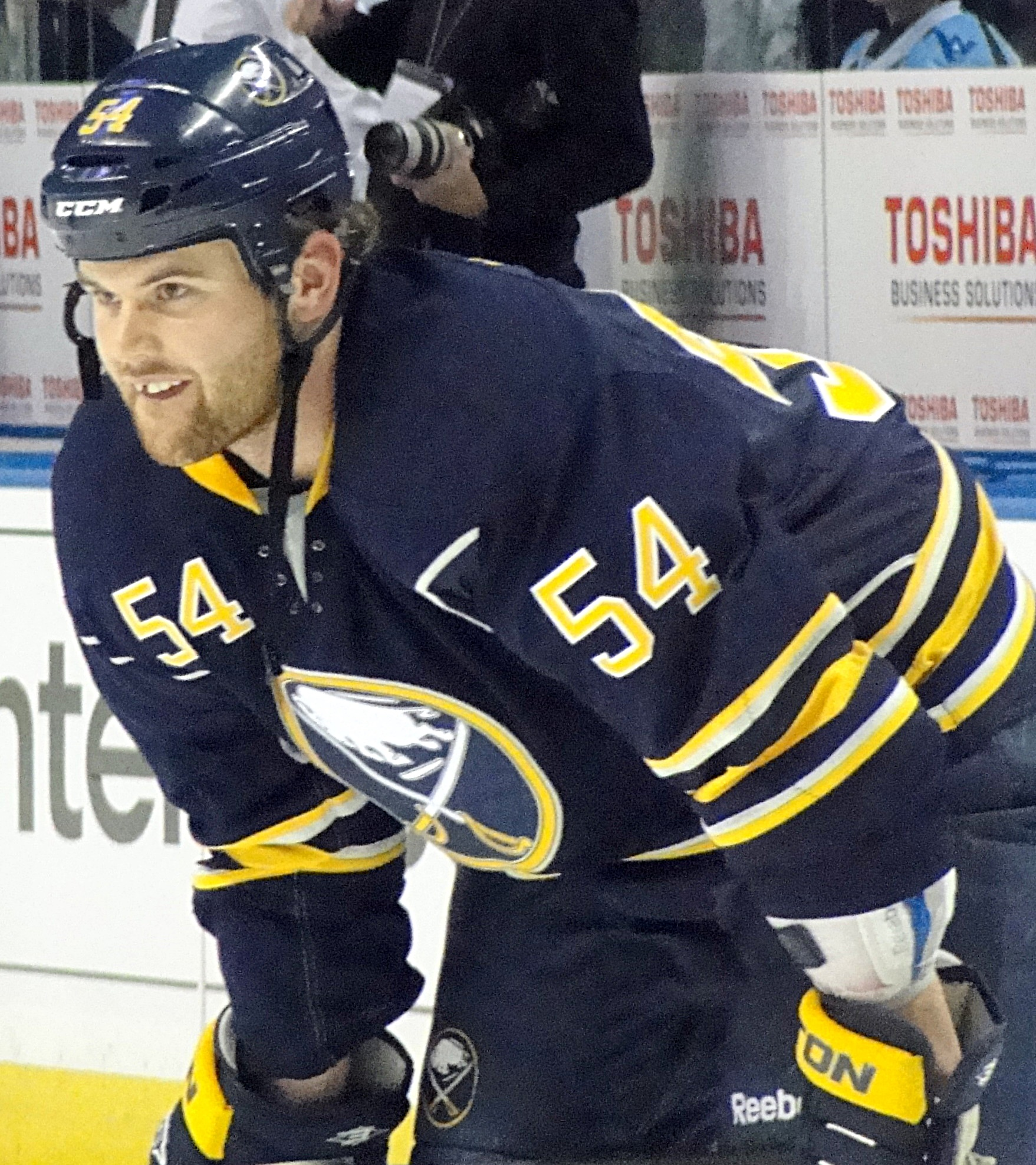
Kassian with the Buffalo Sabres in February 2012

With his junior season over, Kassian was assigned by the Sabres to their American Hockey League (AHL) affiliate, the Portland Pirates, for their Calder Cup playoffs on April 29, 2011. The following night, he made his AHL debut in Game 3 of the Atlantic Division Finals against the Binghamton Senators. Appearing in his first three professional-level games, he recorded nine shots on goal without any points, as Portland was eliminated in six games.

Though eligible for a fifth season of junior as a potential overager, (Note: Major junior teams are permitted a designated number of 20-year-old players on their roster.) Kassian turned professional with the Sabres organization for the 2011–12 season. He was initially assigned to the Sabres' new minor league affiliate, the Rochester Americans, out of training camp and began the season in the AHL. On November 24, 2011, Kassian was recalled by Buffalo. Making his NHL debut the following night against the Columbus Blue Jackets, he recorded his first NHL point, assisting on a Jordan Leopold goal. Playing on back-to-back nights, Kassian then scored his first NHL goal the following game against goaltender Tomáš Vokoun in a home game against the Washington Capitals. Kassian remained with the Sabres for a month and a half in his initial NHL stint before being reassigned to Rochester. Later in the season, he earned two more call-ups in January and February 2012, respectively.

==== Vancouver Canucks ====
During his third call-up, minutes before the NHL trade deadline on February 27, 2012, Kassian was dealt, along with defenceman Marc-André Gragnani, to the Vancouver Canucks in exchange for fellow rookie forward Cody Hodgson and defenceman Alexander Sulzer. Canucks General Manager Mike Gillis acknowledged the trade as an effort to balance his team out by giving up Hodgson's skill and finesse in return for Kassian's size and toughness. Analysts from TSN and The Vancouver Sun also echoed the sentiment, commenting that while the Canucks gained elements in Kassian that were required to succeed in the playoffs, Hodgson's skill set reflected the style of play that Vancouver's success was based upon.

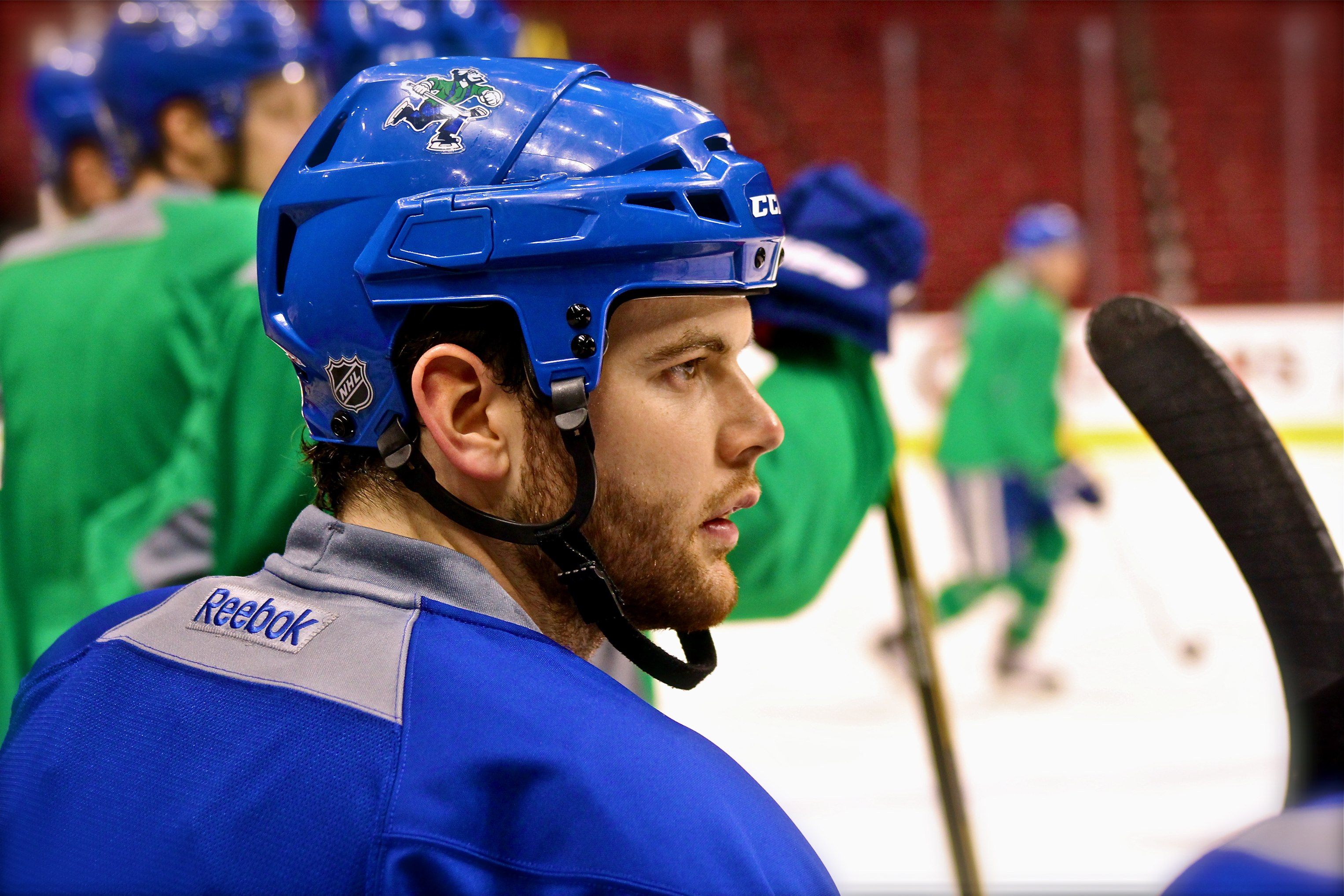
Kassian at Vancouver Canucks team practice in March 2012

In a telephone interview with Andrew Greven of TSN shortly after the trade, Kassian said he was surprised at the trade but was excited to play for a Stanley Cup-contending team. The reaction in the Vancouver media was largely of surprise that Gillis would trade away a well-performing rookie for one that was unproven at the NHL level. The Vancouver Sun columnist Iain MacIntyre declared it "a stunner" and "one of the most unpopular trades in Vancouver in years." Another Sun article likened the deal to a lopsided 1996 trade between the Canucks and Pittsburgh Penguins in which two first-round prospects of opposite playing styles – the skilled Markus Näslund and the larger, more aggressive Alek Stojanov – were exchanged. (Note: Naslund went on to become the Canucks' all-time leading goal- and point-scorer, while Stojanov had a short career in the minor leagues and was widely regarded as a draft bust.)

Kassian made his Canucks debut the night after the trade, registering a shot on goal and 12 minutes and 27 seconds of ice time in a 2–1 shootout loss to the Phoenix Coyotes. Kassian scored a goal and an assist, his first of each with the Canucks, in a game against the Sabres on March 3, his third game with the Canucks. The following game, against the Dallas Stars, Kassian was called to take a penalty shot 24 seconds after the opening faceoff, making it the second-fastest penalty shot to be called in NHL history (after Maurice Richard took a penalty shot 12 seconds into a game against the Chicago Blackhawks). He missed against goaltender Richard Bachman while attempting a backhand deke. On July 3, 2014, Kassian signed a two-year contract extension with the Canucks worth $3.5 million.

==== Trade to Montreal ====
On July 1, 2015, Kassian and a 5th-round selection in the 2016 NHL entry draft were traded to the Montreal Canadiens in exchange for Brandon Prust. On October 4, he was involved in a car accident on a non-practice day, suffering a broken nose and a fractured left foot. Kassian was not the driver of the car, however he was under the influence. This resulted in Kassian being suspended without pay and sent to the NHL's substance abuse program. On December 15, after completing the substance abuse program, the NHL announced Kassian's return from suspension. However, only a few hours after the announcement, the Canadiens put him on waivers. On December 26, Kassian was told to not report to the St. John's IceCaps by the Montreal Canadiens.

==== Edmonton Oilers ====
On December 28, 2015, Kassian was traded from the Montreal Canadiens to the Edmonton Oilers for goaltender Ben Scrivens. Kassian scored his first goal as an Oiler against the Tampa Bay Lightning on the road on January 19, 2016.

On June 26, 2017, Kassian signed a three-year deal worth a reported $5.85 million.

On January 29, 2020, Kassian signed a four-year contract extension worth $12.8 million with an annual salary of $3.2 million.

On February 14, 2020, NHL's Department of Player Safety announced Kassian had been suspended for seven games for kicking Erik Černák of the Tampa Bay Lightning, and had to forfeit $166,463.43 in salary. The suspension was the fourth of Kassian's NHL career and came one month after he was suspended two games for an altercation with Calgary Flames player Matthew Tkachuk, for violating rule 46.2 of the NHL rule book as an aggressor when he dropped his gloves.

==== Arizona Coyotes ====
On July 7, 2022, Kassian was sent to the Arizona Coyotes along with Edmonton's first-round pick (29th overall) in the 2022 NHL entry draft, a second-round pick in 2024, and a third-round pick in 2025, in exchange for Arizona's 32nd overall pick in the 2022 Draft.

In the following 2022–23 season, Kassian was primarily used in a fourth-line checking role, posting a career-low two points through 51 regular season games. On June 20, 2023, Kassian was placed on unconditional waivers by the Coyotes and was bought out from the remaining year of his contract and released to become a free agent the following day.

==== Retirement from NHL ====
On September 1, 2023, Kassian accepted an invitation to attend the Anaheim Ducks' 2023 training camp on a professional tryout contract (PTO). On October 8, the Ducks released Kassian from his professional tryout contract, and on October 26, Kassian announced his retirement from NHL play after 12 seasons.

==== Sparta Praha ====
On January 28, 2024, Kassian was signed by HC Sparta Praha of the Czech Extraliga (ELH) for the remainder of 2023–24 season.

== International play ==
Medal record

Ice hockey

Representing Canada

World Junior Championships
Silver medal – second place	2011 Buffalo	

Representing Ontario

World U-17 Hockey Challenge
Gold medal – first place	2008 London	

Kassian debuted internationally with Hockey Canada at the 2008 World U-17 Hockey Challenge, competing for Team Ontario. He recorded two goals and six points over six games as Ontario won the gold medal. The following year, he moved on to the under-18 level with Canada at the 2009 IIHF World U18 Championships. With two goals and five points over six games, he helped Canada to a fourth-place finish. Two years later, Kassian joined Canada's under-20 team for the 2011 World Junior Championships in Buffalo, New York. During the tournament, he received a two-game suspension for a hit against Czech defenceman Petr Senkerik, making contact with Senkerik's chin with his shoulder. Kassian returned for the medal round and helped Canada to the gold medal game, where they lost 5–3 to Russia. He finished the tournament with two goals and an assist over five games.

== Career statistics ==
=== Regular season and playoffs ===
			Regular season					Playoffs
Season	Team	League	GP	G	A	Pts	PIM	GP	G	A	Pts	PIM
2006–07	Windsor Jr. Spitfires AAA	AH U16	57	32	48	80	136	—	—	—	—	—
2006–07	Leamington Flyers	WOHL	2	0	0	0	6	—	—	—	—	—
2007–08	Peterborough Petes	OHL	58	9	12	21	74	5	1	0	1	2
2008–09	Peterborough Petes	OHL	61	24	39	63	136	4	0	2	2	8
2009–10	Peterborough Petes	OHL	33	8	19	27	58	—	—	—	—	—
2009–10	Windsor Spitfires	OHL	5	4	0	4	23	19	7	9	16	38
2010–11	Windsor Spitfires	OHL	56	26	51	77	67	16	6	10	16	37
2010–11	Portland Pirates	AHL	—	—	—	—	—	3	0	0	0	2
2011–12	Rochester Americans	AHL	30	15	11	26	31	—	—	—	—	—
2011–12	Buffalo Sabres	NHL	27	3	4	7	20	—	—	—	—	—
2011–12	Vancouver Canucks	NHL	17	1	2	3	31	4	0	0	0	2
2012–13	Chicago Wolves	AHL	29	8	13	21	61	—	—	—	—	—
2012–13	Vancouver Canucks	NHL	39	7	4	11	51	4	0	0	0	4
2013–14	Vancouver Canucks	NHL	73	14	15	29	124	—	—	—	—	—
2014–15	Vancouver Canucks	NHL	42	10	6	16	81	—	—	—	—	—
2015–16	Bakersfield Condors	AHL	7	2	1	3	16	—	—	—	—	—
2015–16	Edmonton Oilers	NHL	36	3	5	8	114	—	—	—	—	—
2016–17	Edmonton Oilers	NHL	79	7	17	24	101	13	3	0	3	27
2017–18	Edmonton Oilers	NHL	74	7	12	19	92	—	—	—	—	—
2018–19	Edmonton Oilers	NHL	79	15	11	26	102	—	—	—	—	—
2019–20	Edmonton Oilers	NHL	59	15	19	34	69	4	0	0	0	2
2020–21	Edmonton Oilers	NHL	27	2	3	5	15	4	1	1	2	0
2021–22	Edmonton Oilers	NHL	58	6	13	19	63	16	2	2	4	12
2022–23	Arizona Coyotes	NHL	51	2	0	2	50	—	—	—	—	—
2023–24	HC Sparta Praha	ELH	8	2	1	3	4	—	—	—	—	—
NHL totals			661	92	111	203	913	45	6	3	9	47
ELH totals			8	2	1	3	4	—	—	—	—	—

=== International ===
Year	Team	Event	Result	GP	G	A	Pts	PIM
2008	Canada Ontario	U17	1st place, gold medalist(s)	6	2	4	6	4
2008	Canada	IH18	1st place, gold medalist(s)	4	0	2	2	12
2009	Canada	U18	4th	6	2	3	5	0
2011	Canada	WJC	2nd place, silver medalist(s)	5	2	1	3	27
Junior totals				21	6	10	16	43

== Notes ==
Awards and achievements
Preceded by Tyler Ennis	Buffalo Sabres first-round draft pick 2009	Succeeded by Mark Pysyk
