= Luboš Rob =

Czech ice hockey player

- Born: August 5, 1970 (age 55) České Budějovice, Czechoslovakia
- Height: 5 ft 11 in (180 cm)
- Weight: 191 lb (87 kg; 13 st 9 lb)
- Position: Left wing
- Shot: Left
- Played for: HC České Budějovice; VHK Vsetín; HC Sparta Praha; KalPa; HC Ds České Budějovice
- NHL draft: 99th overall, 1990; New York Rangers
- Playing career: 1988–2015

Luboš Rob (born August 5, 1970) is a Czech professional ice hockey player. He was selected by the New York Rangers of the National Hockey League (NHL) in the fifth round, 99th overall, of the 1990 NHL entry draft.

Rob made his Czechoslovak Extraliga debut playing with HC České Budějovice during the 1987–88 Czechoslovak Extraliga season. He went on to play 19 seasons and 681 games in the Czechoslovak/Czech Extraliga scoring 215 goals and 303 assists for 518 points while registering 513 minutes in penalties.

Rob's final season in the Czech Extraliga was 2006–07, but he continues to play in the Czech lower leagues.

== Career statistics ==
| | | | Regular season | | | | | Playoffs |
| Season | Team | League | GP | G | A | Pts | PIM | GP | G | A | Pts | PIM |
|---|---|---|---|---|---|---|---|---|---|---|---|---|
| 1985–86 | Motor Ceske Budejovice U18 | Czechoslovakia U18 | 33 | 77 | 52 | 129 | 34 | — | — | — | — | — |
| 1987–88 | TJ Motor České Budějovice | Czechoslovakia | 1 | 1 | 0 | 1 | — | — | — | — | — | — |
| 1988–89 | TJ Motor České Budějovice | Czechoslovakia | 34 | 16 | 9 | 25 | 6 | 12 | 5 | 5 | 10 | — |
| 1989–90 | TJ Motor České Budějovice | Czechoslovakia | 47 | 16 | 24 | 40 | — | — | — | — | — | — |
| 1991–92 | HC Motor České Budějovice | Czech2 | — | 32 | 29 | 61 | — | — | — | — | — | — |
| 1992–93 | HC České Budějovice | Czechoslovakia | 37 | 23 | 21 | 44 | 86 | 3 | 0 | 0 | 0 | 2 |
| 1993–94 | HC České Budějovice | Czech | 32 | 14 | 20 | 34 | 20 | 3 | 0 | 1 | 1 | 2 |
| 1994–95 | HC České Budějovice | Czech | 41 | 14 | 22 | 36 | 14 | 9 | 2 | 5 | 7 | 2 |
| 1995–96 | HC České Budějovice | Czech | 39 | 12 | 25 | 37 | 36 | 10 | 6 | 3 | 9 | 2 |
| 1996–97 | HC České Budějovice | Czech | 52 | 16 | 27 | 43 | 57 | 5 | 5 | 1 | 6 | 0 |
| 1997–98 | HC České Budějovice | Czech | 52 | 18 | 22 | 40 | 58 | — | — | — | — | — |
| 1998–99 | KalPa | SM-liiga | 19 | 5 | 8 | 13 | 12 | — | — | — | — | — |
| 1998–99 | HC České Budějovice | Czech | 21 | 7 | 8 | 15 | 20 | 3 | 0 | 0 | 0 | 4 |
| 1999–00 | HC České Budějovice | Czech | 52 | 9 | 29 | 38 | 40 | 3 | 0 | 0 | 0 | 0 |
| 2000–01 | HC České Budějovice | Czech | 46 | 10 | 25 | 35 | 34 | — | — | — | — | — |
| 2001–02 | HC České Budějovice | Czech | 52 | 10 | 12 | 22 | 30 | — | — | — | — | — |
| 2002–03 | HC České Budějovice | Czech | 52 | 24 | 28 | 52 | 52 | 4 | 0 | 0 | 0 | 6 |
| 2003–04 | HC České Budějovice | Czech | 25 | 3 | 8 | 11 | 24 | — | — | — | — | — |
| 2004–05 | HC České Budějovice | Czech2 | 36 | 14 | 6 | 20 | 20 | 10 | 2 | 1 | 3 | 4 |
| 2005–06 | Vsetínská hokejová | Czech | 34 | 4 | 5 | 9 | 14 | — | — | — | — | — |
| 2005–06 | KLH Vajgar Jindřichův Hradec | Czech2 | 14 | 2 | 1 | 3 | 18 | — | — | — | — | — |
| 2006–07 | Vsetínská hokejová | Czech | 42 | 11 | 7 | 18 | 50 | — | — | — | — | — |
| 2006–07 | HC Sparta Praha | Czech | 9 | 2 | 3 | 5 | 6 | 15 | 2 | 0 | 2 | 8 |
| 2007–08 | HC Kometa Brno | Czech2 | 28 | 3 | 4 | 7 | 18 | — | — | — | — | — |
| 2009–10 | HC Tábor | Czech2 | 18 | 6 | 1 | 7 | 8 | 5 | 0 | 1 | 1 | 6 |
| 2011–12 | David Servis Ceske Budejovice | Czech4 | 14 | 17 | 13 | 30 | 12 | 8 | 7 | 6 | 13 | 18 |
| 2012–13 | David Servis Ceske Budejovice | Czech4 | 18 | 17 | 16 | 33 | 22 | 8 | 9 | 7 | 16 | 10 |
| 2013–14 | David Servis Ceske Budejovice | Czech4 | 19 | 14 | 23 | 37 | 28 | 4 | 3 | 2 | 5 | 4 |
| 2014–15 | David Servis Ceske Budejovice | Czech4 | 2 | 2 | 2 | 4 | 4 | — | — | — | — | — |
| Czech totals | | | 549 | 154 | 241 | 395 | 455 | 52 | 15 | 10 | 25 | 24 |
