= Katarína Horáková =

Slovak biologist

- Born: 12 October 1934 (age 91); Bratislava, Czechoslovakia
- Scientific career
- Workplaces: Slovak University of Technology in Bratislava

Katarína Horáková, published in English speaking countries as Katarina Horak (born 12 October 1934), is a Slovak biologist. She is a professor of biology at the Faculty of Chemical and Food Technology, Slovak University of Technology in Bratislava, Slovakia.

She was born in Bratislava (then part of Czechoslovakia).

== Bibliography ==
2012 - Body Detox , English, pages 82
2012 - Body Detox (Detoxikácia organizmu - 6th extended edition), Slovak, pages 132
2011 - Warning Signals of the Body (Varovné signály tela), Slovak, pages 300
2010 - Art of Healthy Living (Umenie zdravo žiť - 2nd edition), Slovak, pages 240
2010 - Body Detox (Detoxikácia organizmu - 5th edition), Slovak, pages 84
2010 - Body Detox (A szervezet méregtelenítése - 2nd edition), Hungarian, pages 84
2009 - Art of Healthy Living (Umenie zdravo žiť - 1st edition), Slovak, pages 240
2009 - Body Detox (Detoxikácia organizmu - 4th edition), Slovak, pages 84
2008 - Body Detox (Detoxikácia organizmu - 3rd edition), Slovak, pages 84
2008 - Body Detox (A szervezet méregtelenítése - 1st edition), Hungarian, pages 84
2008 - Body Detox (Detoxikáce organizmu), Czech, pages 84
2008 - Body Detox (Detoxikácia organizmu - 2nd edition), Slovak, pages 84
2007 - Body Detox (Detoxikácia organizmu - 1st edition), Slovak, pages 84
2005 - The Health Monitor (Monitor zdravia), Slovak, pages 200
2002 - Separated Diet Cleansing Treatments and Portioning (Oddelená strava - Očistné kúry a diéty), Slovak, 2 editions, pages 68
2001 - Separated Diet Recipes and Portioning (Oddelená strava - Recepty a diéty), Slovak, 6 editions (2001–2002), pages 68
2001 - The Separated Diet – And Now What? (Dělená strava - A co dále?), Czech, 3 editions (2001–2002), pages 144
2001 - Don‘t Be Afraid of Health (Nebojme se zdraví), Czech, 3 editions (2001–2002), pages 144
2001 - The Separated Diet – And Now What? (Oddelená strava - A čo ďalej?), Slovak, 4 editions (2001–2002), pages 144
1999 - Don‘t Be Afraid of Health (Nebojme sa zdravia), Slovak, 6 editions (1999–2002), pages 144
1998 - The Separated Diet (Dělená strava), Czech, 8 editions (1998–2002), pages 144
1998 - The Separated Diet (Oddelená strava), Slovak, 10 editions (1998–2002), pages 144

== Publications ==
- Nemec, P; Drobnica, L; Antos, K; Kristian, P; Hulka, A; Horakova, K (1958). "Cancerostatic action of beta-naphtylisothiocyanate". Neoplasma. 5 (2): 207–8. PMID 13600524.
- Betina, Vladimír; Horáková, Katarína; Baráth, Zoltán (1962). "Anti-HeLa cell effect of cyanein". Die Naturwissenschaften. 49 (10): 241. Bibcode:1962NW.....49..241B. doi:10.1007/BF00628022. S2CID 5061124.
- Horáková, Katarína; Veliký, Ivan (1962). "Growth effect of cobalt on HeLa cells". Die Naturwissenschaften. 49 (21): 503. Bibcode:1962NW.....49..503H. doi:10.1007/BF00637054. S2CID 27411712.
- Horáková, K. (1964). "Comparative Study of the Cytotoxicity of some Cytostatics and Inhibitors toward Microorganisms and Animal Cells". Folia Microbiologica. 9: 138–9.
- Ebringer, L.; Balan, J.; Čatár, G.; Horáková, K.; Ebringerová, J. (1965). "Effect of trypacidin on Toxoplasma gondii in tissue culture and in mice". Experimental Parasitology. 16 (2): 182–9. doi:10.1016/0014-4894(65)90042-1. PMID 14281215.
- Horáková, Katarína; Kalafut, František (1965). "Mikrokinematographische Analyse des Absterbens der HeLa-Zellen unter dem Einfluß des Inhibitors" [Microcinematographic analysis of the decay of HeLa cells under the influence of an inhibitory agent]. Die Naturwissenschaften (in German). 52 (17): 501–2. Bibcode:1965NW.....52..501H. doi:10.1007/BF00646593. PMID 5326261. S2CID 35374965.
- Horáková, K. (1966). "Study of the Synergic Effect of a Combination of Natural and Synthetic Substances on Candida albicans Pn 10". pp. 222–3. in "Fifth annual meeting of the Czechoslovak microbiological society Bratislava, December 9–10, 1965". Folia Microbiologica. 11 (3): 215–37. 1966. doi:10.1007/BF02901435. S2CID 39200419.
- Horáková, Katarína (1966). "Cytotoxicity of natural and synthetic isothiocyanates". Die Naturwissenschaften. 53 (15): 383–4. Bibcode:1966NW.....53..383H. doi:10.1007/BF01185150. S2CID 33515577.
- Horáková, K. (1967). "A Study of synergism of known metabolic inhibitors and antifungal compounds on Candida albicans Pn 10". In Girdbardt, M. (ed.). Wirkungsmechanismen von Fungiziden und Antibiotika [Mechanisms of Action of Fungicides and Antibiotics]. Berlin: Academie-Verlag. pp. 387–92. OCLC 685867424.
- Horáková, Katarína; Kalafut, František (1968). "Morfologické zmeny HeLa buniek, vyvolané cytotoxickými koncentráciami izotiokyanátov" [Morphological changes of Hela cells induced by cytotoxic concentrations of isothiocyanates]. Biologia (in Slovak). 23 (6): 438–45. PMID 4875734.
- Betina, V; Baráthová, H; Horáková, K (1968). "Antifungal and cytotoxic effects of cyanein derivatives". Folia Microbiologica. 13 (6): 495–500. doi:10.1007/BF02874220. PMID 5753016. S2CID 6757321.
- Horáková, K; Drobnica, L; Nemec, P; Antos, A; Kristián, P (1968). "Cytotoxic and cancerostatis activity of isothiocyanates and related compounds. I. Activity of some naturally occurring isothiocyanates and their synthetic analogues on HeLa-cells". Neoplasma. 15 (2): 169–76. PMID 5658012.
- Horáková, K; Drobnica, L; Nemec, P; Kristián, P; Antos, K (1968). "Cytotoxic and cancerostatic activity of isothiocyanates and related compounds. II. Activity of substituted phenylisothiocyanates on HeLa-cells". Neoplasma. 15 (2): 177–82. PMID 5658013.
- Horáková, K; Drobnica, L; Nemec, P; Kristián, P; Antos, K; Martvon, A (1969). "Cytotoxic and cancerostatic activity of isothiocyanates and related compounds. 3. The effect of stilbene, azobenzene and polycondensed aromatic hydrocarbon ITC derivatives on HeLa cells". Neoplasma. 16 (3): 231–7. PMID 5349795.
- Horáková, K; Drobnica, L; Nemec, P (1969). "Cytotoxic and cancerostatic effects of isothiocyanates and related compounds. IV. Benzhydryl- and cinamoylisothiocyanates". Neoplasma. 16 (6): 591–6. PMID 5369024.
- Horáková, K; Drobnica, L; Nemec, P; Uher, M (1970). "Cyttoxic and cancerostatic activity of isothiocyanates and related compounds. V. ITC with sulphide and sulphone groups". Neoplasma. 17 (1): 3–8. PMID 4986664.
- Horáková, K; Drobnica, L; Nemec, P (1970). "Cytotoxic and cancerostatic activity of isothiocyanates and related compounds. VI. Isothiocyanates of the R-C6H4-X-C6H4-NCS type". Neoplasma. 17 (1): 9–14. PMID 5423435.
- Horáková, K; Kalafut, F (1970). "Degeneration of HeLa-cells induced by the cytotoxic effect of isothiocyanates or by the starvation of cells". Acta Morphologica Academiae Scientiarum Hungaricae. 18 (3): 193–202. PMID 4932286.
- Horáková, K; Kalafut, F (1970). "Reversible and irreversible cytotoxic effects of isothiocyanates on HeLa-cells". Acta Morphologica Academiae Scientiarum Hungaricae. 18 (4): 311–7. PMID 4941228.
- Horáková, K; Drobnica, L; Nemec, P (1971). "Cytotoxic and cancerostatic effect of isothiocyanates and related compounds. VII. Effect of isothiocyanatechalkones on HeLa cells". Neoplasma. 18 (4): 355–9. PMID 5568929.
- Vlcková, A; Gasparic, J; Horáková, K (1971). "Investigation of the cytotoxicity of different trypan blue commercial products". Bulletin de l'Académie Polonaise des Sciences. 19 (12): 763–70. PMID 5141678.
- Tidd, DM; Kim, SC; Horakova, K; Moriwaki, A; Paterson, AR (1972). "A delayed cytotoxic reaction for 6-mercaptopurine". Cancer Research. 32 (2): 317–22. PMID 5058188.
- Horáková, K (1972). "Polynucleotidases in mouse ascitic tumour cells". Neoplasma. 19 (5): 459–68. PMID 4345214.
- Fuska, JAN; Ivanitskaya, Ludmila; Horakova, Katarina; Kuhr, IVO (1974). "The Cytotoxic Effects of a New Antibiotic Vermiculine". The Journal of Antibiotics. 27 (2): 141–2. doi:10.7164/antibiotics.27.141. PMID 4856963.
- Horáková, K; Navarová, J; Nemec, P; Kettner, M (1974). "Effect of dactylarin of HeLa cells". The Journal of Antibiotics. 27 (6): 408–12. doi:10.7164/antibiotics.27.408. PMID 4851620.
- Horáková, K; Kalafut, F; Navarová, J; Paterson, AR (1974). "Delayed expression of 6-mercaptopurine cytotoxicity toward HeLa cells". Neoplasma. 21 (5): 555–60. PMID 4612392.
- Horáková, K.; Navarova, J.; Paterson, A.R.P. (1974). "The delayed cytotoxic effect of 6-mercaptopurine Characterization of the unbalanced growth in HeLa cells produced by 6-mercaptopurine". Biochimica et Biophysica Acta (BBA) - Nucleic Acids and Protein Synthesis. 366 (3): 333–40. doi:10.1016/0005-2787(74)90293-7. PMID 4425657.
- Vrbovský, L.; Horáková, K.; Navarová, J.; Veber, P.; Ebringer, L (1975). "The Study of correlation between in vivo and in vitro toxicity". Proceedings of the European Society of Toxicology. 16: 236–41. ISSN 0166-6169.
- Horáková, K (1975). "Ribonucleases in mouse Ascitic Tumor Cells during Ageing in Vivo and in Vitro". Cell Impairment in Aging and Development. Advances in Experimental Medicine and Biology. Vol. 53. pp. 521–7. doi:10.1007/978-1-4757-0731-1_44. ISBN 978-1-4757-0733-5. PMID 1054532.
- Horáková, K; Fusková, A; Ceglédyová, N (1976). "Sacharose density gradient separation of Ehrlich ascites carcinoma and L-5178Y tumor cells in different cell cycle phases". Neoplasma. 23 (5): 499–505. PMID 980180.
- Horáková, K; Kernáćová, B; Nemec, P; Fuska, J (1976). "Characterization of the cytotoxic activity of vermiculine". The Journal of Antibiotics. 29 (10): 1109–11. doi:10.7164/antibiotics.29.1109. PMID 994328.
- Horáková, K; Betina, V (1977). "Cytotoxic activity of macrocyclic metabolites from fungi". Neoplasma. 24 (1): 21–7. PMID 840336.
- Horáková, K.; Ceglédyová, N.; Veber, P. (1977). "Effect of Cyanein on the Life Cycle of L-Cells". Biologia. 32: 951–7.
- Horáková, K; Czíková, S; Kernácová, B (1978). "The suitability of different quantitative methods for determination of the cytotoxic activity of agents in cell cultures". Neoplasma. 25 (3): 309–15. PMID 683375.
- Drobnica, L; Sturdík, E; Horáková, K; Miko, M (1978). "Cytotoxic and cancerostatic effect of 1,4-dithiaanthraquinone-2,3-dicarbonitrile". Neoplasma. 25 (5): 577–84. PMID 740057.
- Horáková, Katarína; Obernauerová, Margita (1980). "Zásah bruneomycinu do bunkového cyklu Ehrlichovho ascitického karcinómu" [Interference of Bruneomycin with the Cell Cycle of Ehrlich's Ascites Carcinoma]. Biológia (in Slovak). 35 (12): 875–80.
- Horáková, K. (1981). "The Use of Cell Cultures to Monitor the Toxic and Mutagenic Activity of Chemical Compounds Present in Environment". Československá Fysiologie. 30: 407–25.
- Horáková, K (1981). "Carcinogenic potential in cell cultures". Československá Fysiologie. 30 (6): 517–25. PMID 7032713.
- Horáková, K.; Jantová, S.; Devínsky, F. (1985). "Examination of the relation between the structure and cytotoxic effect of aminoxide derivates upon the cell line HeLa". Biológia. 40: 685–92.
- Vlcková, A; Horáková, K; Sloboda, J; Ulrich, L; Babinská, M; Babulová, A (1986). "The blocking effect of disodium cromoglycate on carcinogenesis induced by benzoapyrene". Carcinogenesis. 7 (3): 371–4. doi:10.1093/carcin/7.3.371. PMID 3081275.
- Horáková, K; Lukácová, D; Kozánková, J; Dzurba, A; Ziegelhöffer, A; Jantová, S (1988). "The mechanism of cytolytic and cytostatic activity of benfluron". Neoplasma. 35 (2): 177–84. PMID 3374709.
- Ebringer, Libor; Jelínek, Richard; Horáková, Katarína; Lahitová, Nora; Seman, M.; Blaško, M.; Chalupa, I (1988). "Genotoxické a embryotoxické účinky 5-nitro-2-furylakrylovej kyseliny - potenciálneho stabilizátora vín" [Genotoxic and Embryotoxic Effects of 5-Nitro-2-Furylacrylic Acid - Potential Wine Stabilizer]. Československá Hygiena (in Slovak). 33 (3): 129–47.
- Horáková, Katarína; Straková, Z.; Jantová, S.; Múčková, M.; Floch, Ľubomír (1989). "Biologický účinok esterov 2-izotiokyanatokarboxylových kyselin. 1. Cytotoxický, antimikrobný a genotoxický screening aminokyselinových izotiokyanatov" [Biological effects of 2-isothiocyanate carboxylic acid esters. 1. Cytotoxic, antimicrobial and genetoxic screening of amino acid isothiocyanate derivatives]. Biológia (in Slovak). 44 (7): 637–46.
- Jantová, Soňa; Horáková, Katarína; Hianiková, Ľudmila; Floch, Ľubomír (1989). "Biologický účinok esterov 2-izotiokynatokarboxylových kyselín. 2. Účinok l-alfa-etylesteru kyseliny 2-izotiokyanatopropanovej na delenie a metabolizmus bunek HeLa" [Biological effects of 2-isothiocyanate carboxylic acid esters. 2. Effect of l-alpha-ethyl ester of 2-isothiocyanate propionic acid on hela cell division and metabolism]. Biológia (in Slovak). 44 (7): 647–55.
- Horáková, K; Valentová, N; Chorváth, B; Perényi, T; Forgács, A (1989). "Study of metabolism and growth limitation of human leukemia cell lines". Neoplasma. 36 (3): 287–95. PMID 2739807.
- Straková, Z; Barancík, M; Lukácová, D; Angyal, R; Slosarcíková, L; Horáková, K (1991). "Peroxidase labelled monoclonal antibody against light chains of human cardiac myosin". General Physiology and Biophysics. 10 (1): 63–70. PMID 1651273.
- Jantová, Soňa; Horáková, Katarína; Hianiková, Ľudmila; Floch, Ľubomír (1991). "Štúdium biologického účinku 2-izotiokyanátokarboxylových kyselín. III. Cytotoxický účinok D- a L- izomérov dietylesteru kyseliny 2-izotiokyanáto-butándikarboxylovej na bunky HeLa a L 1210" [Study of the biological effect of 2-izocyanatecarboxyl acids. III. Cytotoxic effect of D- and L-izomers of diethylester of 2-izotiocyanate-butandicarboxyl acid on HeLa and L 1210 cells]. Biológia (in Slovak). 46 (7): 635–45.
- Hudáková, A.; Horáková, K.; Perényi, T. (1992). "The relation between the synergistic effect of cytostatics and metabolism of V 79B cellsIn Vitro". Cell Biochemistry and Function. 10 (2): 109–13. doi:10.1002/cbf.290100207. PMID 1628379. S2CID 2922758.
- Jantovà, S.; Horàkovà, K. (1993). "9-Hydroxybenfluron induced inhibition of proliferation and metabolism in hela cells". Cell Biochemistry and Function. 11 (2): 131–5. doi:10.1002/cbf.290110209. PMID 8324882. S2CID 26761966.
- Horáková, K; Vlcková, A; Lukácová, D (1993). "Expression of disodium cromoglygate 'protective' effects observed during V79 cell proliferation". Chemico-Biological Interactions. 89 (2–3): 103–13. Bibcode:1993CBI....89..103H. doi:10.1016/0009-2797(93)90002-G. PMID 8269540.
- Horáková, Katarina; Jantová, Soña; Streďanský, Miroslav; Novotná, Ľudmila; Floch, Ľubomir (1993). "Ethyl 4-isothiocyanatobutanoate—antiproliferative activity in vitro and in vivo". Anti-Cancer Drugs. 4 (3): 369–75. doi:10.1097/00001813-199306000-00014. PMID 8358066. S2CID 42814579.
- Jantová, Soňa; Horáková, Katarína (1995). "Study of cytotoxic effect of 9-hydroxybenfluron on V79 B cells". Biologia. 50 (3): 261–7.
- Jantová, Soňa; Horáková, Katarína; Novotná, Marta; Uhrík, Branislav (1995). "Mechanism of cytostatic and cytolytic activity of 9-hydroxybenfluron in HMB-2 human melanom cells". Biologia. 50 (6): 615–22.
- Jantová, Soňa; Horáková, Katarína; Kusý, Pavol (1996). "Comparison of three in vitro cytotoxicity tests: Neutral red assay, protein content measurement and direct cell counting". Biologia. 51 (3): 305–11.
- Kocáková, P.; Leško, J.; Horáková, K.; Golais, F. (1997). "A Combined Effect of Pseudorabies Virus Growth Factor (PGRF) and Various Cytostatics on Tumour (Hep-23) Cells in vitro". Acta Veterinaria Brno. 66 (3): 159. doi:10.2754/avb199766030159.
- Dusinská, M; Jurák, B; Vlcková, A; Horáková, K (1998). "Disodium cromoglycate is neither cytotoxic nor genotoxic in mammalian cells in vitro". Pharmacology & Toxicology. 82 (2): 103–7. doi:10.1111/j.1600-0773.1998.tb01406.x. PMID 9498240.
- Navarová, Jana; Mačičková, Tatiana; Horáková, Katarina; Urbančíková, Miroslava (1999). "Stobadine inhibits lysosomal enzyme release in vivo and in vitro". Life Sciences. 65 (18–19): 1905–7. doi:10.1016/S0024-3205(99)00445-2. PMID 10576435.
- Horáková, K (1999). "The use of cell culture systems for the assessment of general cellular toxicity and to detect the nature and location of free radical damage". General Physiology and Biophysics. 18 Spec No: 63–9. PMID 10703721.
- MacIcková, T; Navarová, J; Urbancíkova, M; Horáková, K (1999). "Comparison of isoproterenol-induced changes in lysosomal enzyme activity in vivo and in vitro". General Physiology and Biophysics. 18 Spec No: 86–91. PMID 10703725.
- Navarová, Jana; Seemannová, Zuzana; Ujházy, Eduard; Sobotníková, Ruzena; Dubovický, Michal; Muchová, Sona; Katarina (2000). "Biochemical variables of oxidative cell and tissue damage induced by phenytoin". Biologia. 55 (Suppl. 8): 81–5. Archived from the original on 2008-03-05.
- Tulinska, J; Sovcikova, A; Liskova, A; Kubova, J; Horakova, K (2000). "Immunotoxicity of ethyl-4-isothiocyanatobutanoate in male Wistar rats". Toxicology. 145 (2–3): 217–25. Bibcode:2000Toxgy.145..217T. doi:10.1016/S0300-483X(99)00225-5. PMID 10771145.
- Šovčíková, A.; Mikulášová, M.; Horáková, K.; Floch, L'. (2001). "Antibacterial and mutagenic activities of new isothiocyanate derivatives". Folia Microbiologica. 46 (2): 113–7. doi:10.1007/BF02873587. PMID 11501396. S2CID 9643101.
- Horáková, Katarı́na; Šovčı́Ková, Andrea; Seemannová, Zuzana; Syrová, Dagmar; Bušányová, Katarı́na; Drobná, Zuzana; Ferenčı́k, Miroslav (2001). "Detection of drug-induced, superoxide-mediated cell damage and its prevention by antioxidants". Free Radical Biology and Medicine. 30 (6): 650–64. doi:10.1016/S0891-5849(00)00508-6. PMID 11295363.
- Sovcikova, Andrea; Tulinska, Jana; Kubova, Jana; Liskova, Aurelia; Syrova, Dagmar; Horakova, Katarina (2002). "Effect of cyclosporin a in Lewis ratsin vivo and HeLa cellsin vitro". Journal of Applied Toxicology. 22 (3): 153–60. doi:10.1002/jat.842. PMID 12015794. S2CID 42319938.
- Sovcikova, Andrea; Tulinska, Jana; Chalupa, Ivan; Liskova, Aurelia; Kuricova, Miroslava; Horvathova, Mira; Seemannova, Zuzana; Horakova, Katarina (2002). "Immunotoxic and cancerostatic effects of ethyl-4-isothiocyanatobutanoate in female Lewis rats with implanted fibrosarcoma". International Immunopharmacology. 2 (12): 1681–91. doi:10.1016/S1567-5769(02)00164-9. PMID 12469942.
- Karamonová, L.; Blažková, M.; Fukal, L.; Rauch, P.; Greifová, M.; Horáková, K.; Tomáška, M.; Roubal, P.; et al. (2003). "Development of an ELISA specific for Listeria monocytogenes using a polyclonal antibody raised against a cell extract containing internalin B". Food and Agricultural Immunology. 15 (3–4): 167–82. doi:10.1080/09540100400003220. S2CID 95985628.
- Horakova, K.; Greifova, M.; Seemannova, Z.; Gondova, B.; Wyatt, G.M. (2004). "A comparison of the traditional method of counting viable cells and a quick microplate method for monitoring the growth characteristics of Listeria monocytogenes". Letters in Applied Microbiology. 38 (3): 181–4. doi:10.1111/j.1472-765X.2004.01448.x. PMID 14962037.
- Bodo, Juraj; Jakubikova, Jana; Chalupa, Ivan; Bartosova, Zdena; Horakova, Katarina; Floch, Lubomir; Sedlak, Jan (2006). "Apoptotic effect of ethyl-4-isothiocyanatobutanoate is associated with DNA damage, proteasomal activity and induction of p53 and p21cip1/waf1". Apoptosis. 11 (8): 1299–310. doi:10.1007/s10495-006-8760-5. PMID 16830228. S2CID 6341212.
