= Martin Hosták =

Czech ice hockey player, color commentator, and studio analyst

- Born: November 11, 1967 (age 58) Hradec Králové, Czechoslovakia
- Height: 6 ft 4 in (193 cm)
- Weight: 209 lb (95 kg; 14 st 13 lb)
- Position: Right wing
- Shot: Left
- Played for: Sparta Praha; Philadelphia Flyers; MoDo; Södertälje SK; Luleå HF
- National team: Czech Republic
- NHL draft: 62nd overall, 1987; Philadelphia Flyers
- Playing career: 1986–2001

Martin Hosták (born November 11, 1967) is a retired Czech professional ice hockey player. He played 55 games in the National Hockey League with the Philadelphia Flyers during the 1990–91 and 1991–92 seasons. The rest of his career, which lasted from 1986 to 2001, was mainly spent in the Czechoslovak First Ice Hockey League and the Swedish Elitserien. Internationally Hosták played for both Czechoslovakia and the Czech Republic at several tournaments, including three World Championships, winning two bronze medals, and the 1994 Winter Olympics.

He worked as a color commentator and studio analyst for Extraliga and international hockey on Czech TV until 2017. He now works as a general manager of Czech hockey club Aukro Berani Zlín.

His sister is former tennis player Olga Hostáková, while his nieces Annika and Kristina Penickova are now professional tennis players.

== Career statistics ==
=== Regular season and playoffs ===
			Regular season					Playoffs
Season	Team	League	GP	G	A	Pts	PIM	GP	G	A	Pts	PIM
1983–84	HC Hradec Králové	CSSE U18	34	62	43	105	—	—	—	—	—	—
1984–85	TJ Stadion Hradec Králové	CSSR-2	—	4	—	—	—	—	—	—	—	—
1985–86	TJ Stadion Hradec Králové	CSSR-2	—	14	—	—	—	—	—	—	—	—
1986–87	TJ Sparta ČKD Praha	CSSR	34	6	0	6	2	6	1	2	3
1987–88	TJ Sparta ČKD Praha	CSSR	26	8	9	17	4	—	—	—	—	—
1988–89	TJ Sparta ČKD Praha	CSSR	23	8	9	17	10	12	6	3	9
1989–90	TJ Sparta ČKD Praha	CSSR	44	26	27	53	49	11	4	7	11
1990–91	Philadelphia Flyers	NHL	50	3	10	13	22	—	—	—	—	—
1990–91	Hershey Bears	AHL	11	6	2	8	2	3	1	0	1	0
1991–92	Philadelphia Flyers	NHL	5	0	1	1	2	—	—	—	—	—
1991–92	Hershey Bears	AHL	63	27	36	63	77	6	1	2	3	2
1992–93	Modo Hockey	SEL	40	15	19	34	42	3	4	2	6	8
1993–94	Modo Hockey	SEL	34	16	17	33	28	4	1	0	1	2
1994–95	Modo Hockey	SEL	40	14	17	31	30	—	—	—	—	—
1995–96	Modo Hockey	SEL	36	12	15	27	28	8	0	2	2	4
1996–97	HC Sparta Praha	CZE	25	6	13	19	10	—	—	—	—	—
1996–97	Södertälje SK	SEL	21	12	8	20	6	—	—	—	—	—
1997–98	Södertälje SK	SEL	36	16	18	34	30	—	—	—	—	—
1998–99	Luleå HF	SEL	49	19	21	40	34	9	3	1	4	10
1999–2000	Luleå HF	SEL	50	23	16	39	60	9	0	1	1	12
2000–01	Luleå HF	SEL	42	14	17	31	28	12	2	3	5	6
SEL totals			348	141	148	289	286	45	10	9	19	42
NHL totals			55	3	11	14	24	—	—	—	—	—

=== International ===
Medal record

Representing Czechoslovakia

World Championships
Bronze medal – third place	1990 Switzerland	

World Junior Championships
Silver medal – second place	1987 Czechoslovakia	

European Junior Championships
Bronze medal – third place	1985 France	

Representing Czech Republic

World Championships
Bronze medal – third place	1993 Germany	

Year	Team	Event	GP	G	A	Pts	PIM
1985	Czechoslovakia	EJC	5	3	2	5	6
1987	Czechoslovakia	WJC	7	7	3	10	4
1990	Czechoslovakia	WC	4	0	0	0	4
1993	Czech Republic	WC	8	4	4	8	0
1994	Czech Republic	OLY	6	1	0	1	0
1995	Czech Republic	WC	4	0	0	0	2
Junior totals			12	10	5	15	10
Senior totals			22	5	4	9	6
