= Nico Manelius =

Finnish ice hockey player

- Born: March 12, 1991 (age 34); Vantaa, Finland
- Height: 6 ft 0 in (183 cm)
- Weight: 194 lb (88 kg; 13 st 12 lb)
- Position: Defence
- Shoots: Left
- FNL team: Jokerit
- Playing career: 2009–present

Nico Manelius (born March 12, 1991) is a professional ice hockey defender. He currently plays for Jokerit in SM-liiga.
