= Sergei Zolotov =

Russian ice hockey player

- Born: January 27, 1971 (age 54); Kazan, Russian SFSR, Soviet Union
- Height: 5 ft 9 in (175 cm)
- Weight: 163 lb (74 kg; 11 st 9 lb)
- Position: Left wing
- Shot: Right
- Played for: SC Uritskogo Kazan; Krylya Sovetov Moscow; Kristall Elektrostal; EC KAC; Ak Bars Kazan; HC CSKA Moscow; Severstal Cherepovets; Sibir Novosibirsk; Vityaz Chekhov; MHC Dmitrov
- NHL draft: 217th overall, 1991; Calgary Flames
- Playing career: 1987–2008

Sergei Vladimirovich Zolotov (Russian: Сергей Владимирович Золотов; born January 27, 1971) is a Soviet and Russian former professional ice hockey forward. He is a one-time Russian Champion.

== Awards and honors ==
Award	Year
RSL
Winner (Ak Bars Kazan)	1998
