= Oldřich Horák =

Czech ice hockey player

- Born: January 9, 1991 (age 35) Zlín, Czechoslovakia
- Height: 6 ft 0 in (183 cm)
- Weight: 187 lb (85 kg; 13 st 5 lb)
- Position: Defense
- Shot: Left
- Played for: HC Zlín; Orli Znojmo; Boxers de Bordeaux
- Playing career: 2009–2021

Oldřich Horák (born January 9, 1991) is a Czech ice hockey coach and former professional ice hockey defenceman who is an assistant coach for LHK Jestřábi Prostějov of the 2nd Czech Republic Hockey League.

Horák made his Czech Extraliga debut playing with HC Zlín during the 2012–13 Czech Extraliga season.

He announced his retirement from professional hockey on 19 May 2021.
