= Petr Šenkeřík =

Czech ice hockey player

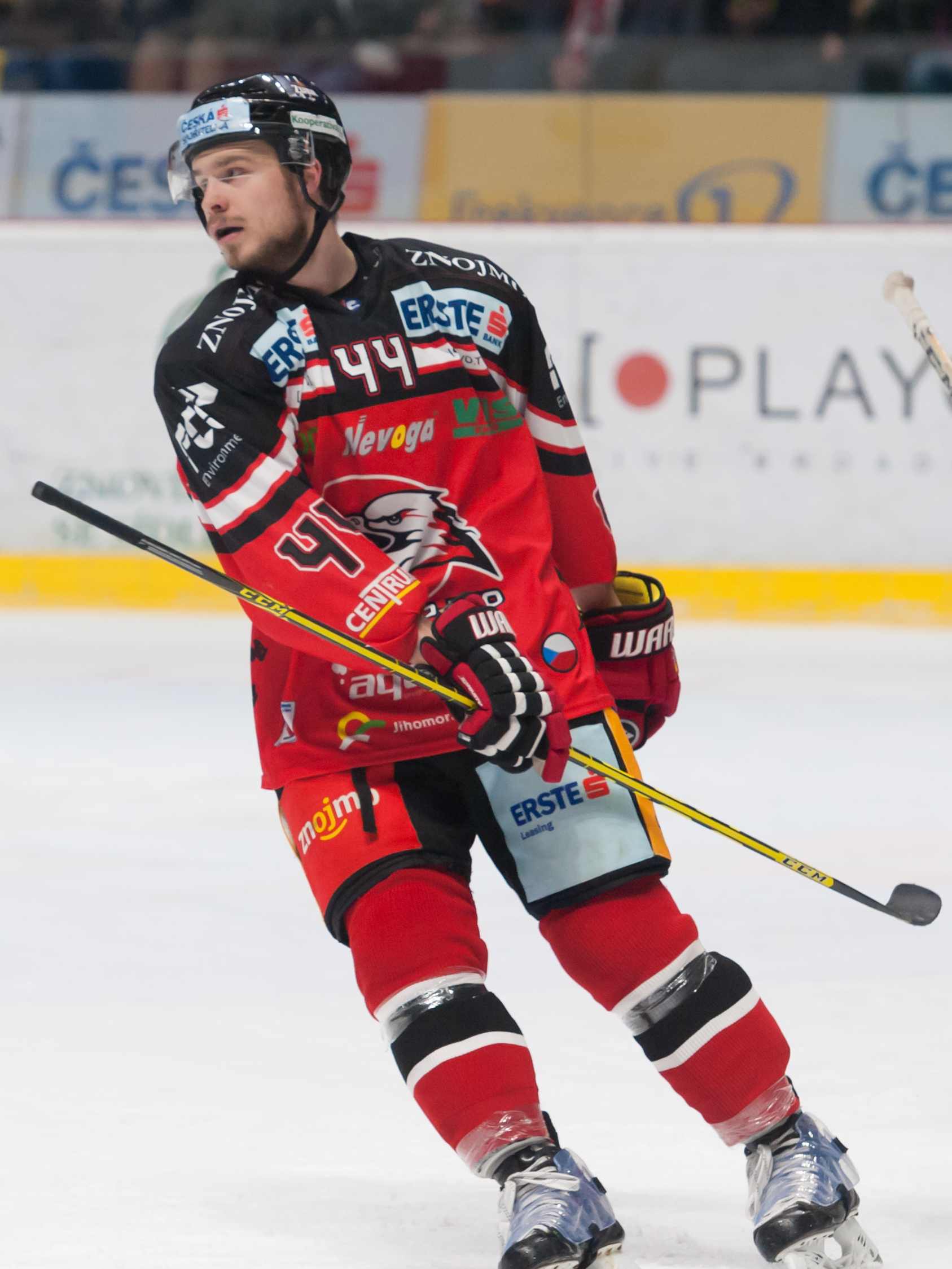
- Born: 13 March 1991 (age 35) Zlín, Czechoslovakia
- Height: 6 ft 0 in (183 cm)
- Weight: 192 lb (87 kg; 13 st 10 lb)
- Position: Forward
- Shoots: Left
- ELH team Former teams: Motor České Budějovice; HC Kometa Brno; HC Zlín; HC Slavia Praha; HC Vítkovice; Orli Znojmo; HC Karlovy Vary
- NHL draft: Undrafted
- Playing career: 2010–present

Petr Šenkeřík (born 13 March 1991) is a Czech professional ice hockey forward who currently plays with Motor České Budějovice in the Czech Extraliga (ELH).
