= Roman Horák (ice hockey, born 1991) =

Czech ice hockey player (born 1991)

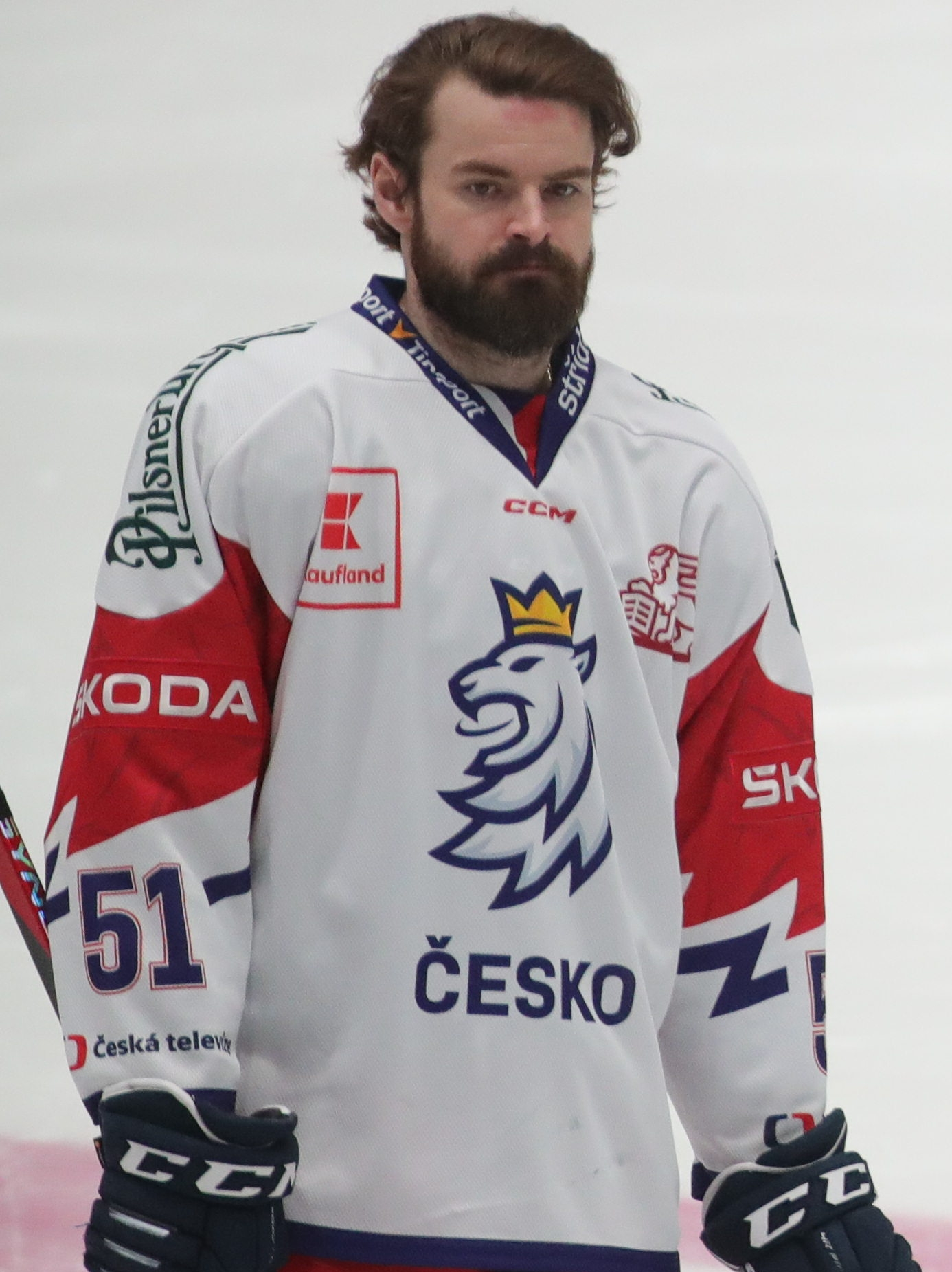
- Horák with the Czech Republic in 2023
- Born: May 21, 1991 (age 35) České Budějovice, Czechoslovakia
- Height: 6 ft 0 in (183 cm)
- Weight: 175 lb (79 kg; 12 st 7 lb)
- Position: Centre
- Shoots: Left
- ELH team Former teams: HC Sparta Praha; HC České Budějovice; Calgary Flames; Edmonton Oilers; HC Vityaz; Växjö Lakers
- National team: Czech Republic
- NHL draft: 127th overall, 2009; New York Rangers
- Playing career: 2007–present

Roman Horák (born May 21, 1991) is a Czech ice hockey player currently playing for HC Sparta Praha of the Czech Extraliga (ELH). He previously played nine games in the Czech Extraliga with HC České Budějovice before coming to North America to play two WHL seasons with the Chilliwack Bruins. He was selected by the New York Rangers in the fifth round, 127th overall, of the 2009 NHL entry draft, and joined the Calgary Flames organization via trade in 2011. In 2014, he was traded by the Flames for a brief stint with the Edmonton Oilers.

== Playing career ==
Horák began his professional career with his hometown team HC České Budějovice of the Czech Extraliga, appearing in one game with the club in 2007–08 and eight more in 2008–09. He was selected by the New York Rangers in the fifth round, 127th overall, at the 2009 NHL entry draft. Additionally, Horák was selected by the Western Hockey League's (WHL) Chilliwack Bruins with the eighth overall pick in the Canadian Hockey League (CHL) import draft. Though he had little knowledge of English, Horák moved to Canada to join the Bruins for the 2009–10 WHL season.

In his first season in Chilliwack, Horák scored 21 goals and 47 points. He improved to 26 goals and 78 points in 2010–11. Additionally, he represented the Czech Republic at the 2010 World Junior Ice Hockey Championships, where he had one goal and one assist in six games. He returned to the team for the 2011 tournament, recording one assist in five games in that tournament.

Horák signed a contract with the New York Rangers on May 6, 2011. However, before he played a game with the NHL team, he was traded to the Calgary Flames on June 1, along with two draft picks, in exchange for defenceman Tim Erixon. The Flames discovered Horák while scouting his teammate, and their draft pick, Ryan Howse. The team realized that Howse, a 50-goal scorer in 2010–11, had become far less effective when Horák suffered an injury.

Initially expected to join the Flames' minor league affiliate, the Abbotsford Heat of the American Hockey League (AHL), to begin the 2011–12 season, Horák exceeded the team's expectations and earned a spot with the Flames. He made his NHL debut and scored his first point, an assist, against the Pittsburgh Penguins on October 8, 2011. He scored his first NHL goal on October 26 against Jean-Sébastien Giguère of the Colorado Avalanche.

On November 8, 2013, Horák was traded to the Edmonton Oilers alongside goaltender prospect Laurent Brossoit in exchange for Ladislav Šmíd and minor league goalie Olivier Roy. He was subsequently reassigned by the Oilers to their AHL affiliate, the Oklahoma City Barons.

With his NHL rights still owned by the Oilers, Horák opted to return to Europe by signing a one-year contract with Russian club Vityaz Podolsk of the Kontinental Hockey League (KHL) on May 12, 2014.

Horák played two seasons in the Swedish Hockey League with the Växjö Lakers before opting to return to his native Czech Republic as a free agent. On 13 May 2020, he secured a one-year contract with HC Sparta Praha of the ELH, in which he had not played since the 2008–09 season.

== Personal life ==
His father, Roman Horák, also played hockey in European elite leagues for 14 seasons.

== Career statistics ==
=== Regular season and playoffs ===
			Regular season					Playoffs
Season	Team	League	GP	G	A	Pts	PIM	GP	G	A	Pts	PIM
2004–05	HC České Budějovice	CZE U18	2	0	0	0	0	—	—	—	—	—
2005–06	HC České Budějovice	CZE U18	34	5	3	8	10	3	0	0	0	4
2006–07	HC Mountfield	CZE U18	24	22	16	38	38	2	1	0	1	4
2006–07	HC Mountfield	CZE U20	16	1	4	5	6	—	—	—	—	—
2007–08	HC Mountfield	CZE U18	2	3	2	5	0	—	—	—	—	—
2007–08	HC Mountfield	CZE U20	34	17	11	28	14	3	0	1	1	0
2007–08	HC Mountfield	ELH	1	0	0	0	0	—	—	—	—	—
2008–09	HC Mountfield	CZE U20	31	16	17	33	14	2	0	0	0	0
2008–09	HC Mountfield	ELH	8	0	0	0	0	—	—	—	—	—
2009–10	Chilliwack Bruins	WHL	66	21	26	47	39	6	2	4	6	4
2010–11	Chilliwack Bruins	WHL	64	26	52	78	60	5	1	2	3	0
2011–12	Calgary Flames	NHL	61	3	8	11	14	—	—	—	—	—
2011–12	Abbotsford Heat	AHL	14	2	2	4	6	8	0	3	3	2
2012–13	Abbotsford Heat	AHL	59	16	14	30	24	—	—	—	—	—
2012–13	Calgary Flames	NHL	20	2	5	7	2	—	—	—	—	—
2013–14	Abbotsford Heat	AHL	13	2	5	7	6	—	—	—	—	—
2013–14	Calgary Flames	NHL	1	0	0	0	0	—	—	—	—	—
2013–14	Oklahoma City Barons	AHL	53	21	27	48	16	3	1	0	1	0
2013–14	Edmonton Oilers	NHL	2	1	0	1	0	—	—	—	—	—
2014–15	HC Vityaz	KHL	53	18	13	31	26	—	—	—	—	—
2015–16	HC Vityaz	KHL	57	15	12	27	32	—	—	—	—	—
2016–17	HC Vityaz	KHL	60	16	15	31	30	4	0	1	1	2
2017–18	HC Vityaz	KHL	54	10	16	26	18	—	—	—	—	—
2018–19	Växjö Lakers	SHL	50	15	18	33	24	7	1	4	5	4
2019–20	Växjö Lakers	SHL	52	11	19	30	18	—	—	—	—	—
2020–21	HC Sparta Praha	ELH	51	17	30	47	6	11	3	6	9	2
2021–22	HC Sparta Praha	ELH	51	21	26	47	24	16	3	3	6	6
2022–23	HC Sparta Praha	ELH	52	12	24	36	14	6	2	1	3	0
2023–24	HC Sparta Praha	ELH	47	16	23	39	2	11	1	3	4	4
2024–25	HC Sparta Praha	ELH	46	15	23	38	8	12	2	1	3	2
2025–26	HC Sparta Praha	ELH	40	17	14	31	10	19	4	6	10	0
ELH totals			298	98	140	238	64	84	16	20	36	14
NHL totals			84	6	13	19	16	—	—	—	—	—
KHL totals			224	59	56	115	106	4	0	1	1	2

=== International ===
Year	Team	Event	Result	GP	G	A	Pts	PIM
2007	Czech Republic	IH18	6th	4	2
2008	Czech Republic	WJC18 D1	11th	5	1	4	5	0
2008	Czech Republic	IH18	5th	4	1
2009	Czech Republic	WJC18	6th	6	2	1	3	4
2010	Czech Republic	WJC	7th	6	1	1	2	0
2011	Czech Republic	WJC	7th	5	0	1	1	4
2017	Czech Republic	WC	7th	8	3	3	6	0
2018	Czech Republic	OG	4th	6	0	4	4	0
2018	Czech Republic	WC	7th	8	3	0	3	0
Senior totals				22	6	7	13	0
