= Roman Horák (ice hockey, born 1969) =

Czech ice hockey player

- Born: 24 September 1969 (age 56) České Budějovice, Czechoslovakia
- Height: 6 ft 0 in (183 cm)
- Weight: 207 lb (94 kg; 14 st 11 lb)
- Position: Centre
- Shot: Left
- Played for: HC České Budějovice; HK Dukla Trenčín; EHC 80 Nürnberg; HC Sparta Praha; Nürnberg Ice Tigers; HC Havířov; Ässät
- National team: Czechoslovakia and Czech Republic
- Playing career: 1987–2006

Roman Horák (born 24 September 1969) is a Czech former professional ice hockey centre.

== Career ==
Horák first played in the Czechoslovak First Ice Hockey League for HC České Budějovice and HK Dukla Trenčín and also played in the Czech Extraliga for České Budějovice, HC Sparta Praha and HC Havířov, following the separation of Czechoslovakia.

Horák also played in Germany's Deutsche Eishockey Liga, playing one game EHC 80 Nürnberg during the 1994-95 season, followed by a second spell with Nürnberg (now known as the Ice Tigers) in 1997. He also spent a season in Finland's SM-liiga for Ässät.

Horák was a member of the Czechoslovakia national team and the Czech Republic national team. He played for the Czech Republic at the 1994 Winter Olympics.

== Personal life ==
His son Roman Horák, is also a hockey player playing currently for the Växjö Lakers of the Swedish Hockey League.

== Career statistics ==
=== Regular season and playoffs ===
| | | | Regular season | | | | | Playoffs |
| Season | Team | League | GP | G | A | Pts | PIM | GP | G | A | Pts | PIM |
|---|---|---|---|---|---|---|---|---|---|---|---|---|
| 1986–87 | TJ Motor České Budějovice | TCH U20 | | 36 | 16 | 52 | | — | — | — | — | — |
| 1986–87 | TJ Motor České Budějovice | TCH | 4 | 0 | 1 | 1 | 0 | — | — | — | — | — |
| 1987–88 | TJ Motor České Budějovice | TCH | 29 | 11 | 10 | 21 | | — | — | — | — | — |
| 1988–89 | TJ Motor České Budějovice | TCH | 37 | 6 | 9 | 15 | 10 | — | — | — | — | — |
| 1989–90 | ASVŠ Dukla Trenčín | TCH | 49 | 18 | 11 | 29 | | — | — | — | — | — |
| 1990–91 | ASVŠ Dukla Trenčín | TCH | 18 | 3 | 15 | 18 | | — | — | — | — | — |
| 1990–91 | TJ Motor České Budějovice | TCH | 29 | 14 | 13 | 27 | | — | — | — | — | — |
| 1991–92 | TJ Motor České Budějovice | CZE.2 | | 31 | 35 | 66 | | — | — | — | — | — |
| 1992–93 | HC České Budějovice | TCH | 42 | 24 | 33 | 57 | | — | — | — | — | — |
| 1993–94 | HC České Budějovice | ELH | 42 | 28 | 30 | 58 | 32 | 3 | 2 | 2 | 4 | 0 |
| 1994–95 | HC České Budějovice | ELH | 43 | 20 | 33 | 53 | 24 | 9 | 6 | 8 | 14 | 2 |
| 1994–95 | EHC 80 Nürnberg | DEL | 1 | 1 | 2 | 3 | 0 | — | — | — | — | — |
| 1995–96 | HC Sparta Praha | ELH | 35 | 24 | 26 | 50 | 8 | 11 | 6 | 10 | 16 | 0 |
| 1996–97 | HC Sparta Praha | ELH | 45 | 17 | 40 | 57 | 6 | 5 | 1 | 3 | 4 | 0 |
| 1997–98 | Nürnberg Ice Tigers | DEL | 45 | 23 | 24 | 47 | 18 | 5 | 1 | 2 | 3 | 2 |
| 1998–99 | HC Sparta Praha | ELH | 32 | 12 | 23 | 35 | 35 | — | — | — | — | — |
| 1999–2000 | HC Sparta Praha | ELH | 3 | 0 | 0 | 0 | 0 | — | — | — | — | — |
| 1999–2000 | HC Femax Havířov | ELH | 36 | 9 | 17 | 26 | 20 | — | — | — | — | — |
| 2000–01 | HC Femax Havířov | ELH | 17 | 3 | 3 | 6 | 2 | — | — | — | — | — |
| 2000–01 | Ässät | SM-l | 34 | 7 | 9 | 16 | 8 | — | — | — | — | — |
| 2001–02 | HC České Budějovice | ELH | 30 | 4 | 9 | 13 | 10 | — | — | — | — | — |
| 2003–04 | HC Strakonice | CZE.3 | 17 | 9 | 15 | 24 | 0 | — | — | — | — | — |
| 2004–05 | HC Strakonice | CZE.3 | 31 | 3 | 12 | 15 | 10 | 12 | 3 | 8 | 11 | 16 |
| 2005–06 | HC Strakonice | CZE.3 | 12 | 5 | 5 | 10 | 4 | — | — | — | — | — |
| TCH totals | | | 208 | 76 | 92 | 168 | | — | — | — | — | — |
| ELH totals | | | 283 | 117 | 181 | 298 | 137 | 28 | 15 | 23 | 38 | 2 |

=== International ===
| Year | Team | Event | GP | G | A | Pts | PIM |
|---|---|---|---|---|---|---|---|
| 1987 | Czechoslovakia | EJC | 7 | 10 | 5 | 15 | 0 |
| 1988 | Czechoslovakia | WJC | 7 | 4 | 2 | 6 | 4 |
| 1993 | Czech Republic | WC | 5 | 0 | 1 | 1 | 0 |
| 1994 | Czech Republic | OG | 8 | 3 | 1 | 4 | 2 |
| 1994 | Czech Republic | WC | 4 | 0 | 1 | 1 | 0 |
| 1995 | Czech Republic | WC | 8 | 1 | 0 | 1 | 4 |
| Junior totals | | | 14 | 14 | 7 | 21 | 4 |
| Senior totals | | | 25 | 4 | 3 | 7 | 6 |
