= 2022 Spengler Cup =

Ice hockey tournament in Switzerland

Tournament details
- Host country: Switzerland
- Venue(s): Eisstadion Davos
- Dates: 26–31 December
- Teams: 6

Final positions
- Champions: (Switzerland) HC Ambrì-Piotta (1st title)
- Runner-up: (Czech Republic) HC Sparta Praha

Tournament statistics
- Games played: 11
- Goals scored: 69 (6.27 per game)
- Attendance: 67,051 (6,096 per game)
- Scoring leader(s): (Canada) Alex Formenton (HC Ambrì-Piotta) (6 points)

Official website
- Spengler Cup

The 2022 Spengler Cup was held from 26 to 31 December 2022 at Eisstadion Davos, Davos.

== Teams participating ==
- Team Canada
- (Czech Republic) HC Sparta Praha
- (Finland) HIFK Hockey
- (Sweden) Örebro HK
- (Switzerland) HC Ambrì-Piotta
- (Switzerland) HC Davos (host)

== Group stage ==
All times are local (UTC+1).

=== Group Torriani ===
Pos	Team	Pld	W	OTW	OTL	L	GF	GA	GD	Pts	Qualification
1	(Switzerland) HC Ambrì-Piotta	2	2	0	0	0	12	5	+7	6	Semifinals
2	(Sweden) Örebro HK	2	1	0	0	1	7	7	0	3	Quarterfinals
3	(Finland) HIFK Hockey	2	0	0	0	2	5	12	−7	0	Quarterfinals

26 December 2022; 15:10	HC Ambrì-Piotta (Switzerland)	5–2 (1–0, 2–1, 2–1)	(Sweden) Örebro HK	Eisstadion Davos; Attendance: 6,267

Game reference

Janne Juvonen
Goalies
Jhonas Enroth
Referees:
(Switzerland) Cedric Borga
(Sweden) Mikael Nord
Linesmen:
(Switzerland) Eric Cattaneo
(Sweden) Anders Nyqvist

Formenton – 12:20	1–0
	1–1	22:07 – Mastomäki (Eklind, Ekström)
Jooris (Pestoni, Zwerger) – 33:42	2–1
McMillan (Formenton) – 34:10	3–1
	3–2	42:10 – Öberg (Holm, Enroth)
Bürgler (Heim, Kneubuehler) – 45:08	4–2
Virtanen (Špaček) (ENG) – 57:23	5–2

6 min
Penalties
6 min
26
Shots
33

27 December 2022; 15:10	HIFK Hockey (Finland)	2–5 (2–2, 0–2, 0–1)	(Sweden) Örebro HK	Eisstadion Davos; Attendance: 5,634

Game reference

Niilo Halonen
Goalies
Jonas Arntzen
Referees:
(Switzerland) Cedric Borga
(Sweden) Mikael Nord
Linesmen:
(Sweden) Anders Nyqvist
(Finland) Hannu Sormunen

	0–1	05:47 – Ekström (Näkyvä, Leino) (PP)
	0–2	11:10 – Berglund (Ekström, Leino) (PP)
Åsten (Luhanka, Larsson) (SH) – 13:25	1–2
Halttunen (Jääskä, Vesalainen) – 15:40	2–2
	2–3	32:00 – Eklind (Ābols, Ekström)
	2–4	38:48 – Ābols (Eklind, Berglund) (SH)
	2–5	58:27 – Wikman (Hardegård, Rissanen) (ENG)

8 min
Penalties
10 min
39
Shots
20

28 December 2022; 15:10	HC Ambrì-Piotta (Switzerland)	7–3 (2–0, 2–2, 3–1)	(Finland) HIFK Hockey	Eisstadion Davos; Attendance: 6,267

Game reference

Benjamin Conz
Goalies
Niilo Halonen
Roope Taponen
Referees:
(Finland) Mikko Kaukokari
(Switzerland) Marc Wiegand
Linesmen:
(Switzerland) Eric Cattaneo
(Finland) Hannu Sormunen

Pestoni – 05:20	1–0
McMillan (Grassi, Fohrler) – 10:31	2–0
Chlapík (Zündel, Špaček) – 22:03	3–0
	3–1	22:46 – Motin
	3–2	29:07 – Rantakari (Vesalainen, Paajanen) (PP)
Kneubuehler (Špaček, Dotti) – 32:16	4–2
Špaček (Chlapík, Virtanen) – 42:00	5–2
	5–3	43:04 – Nättinen (Pakarinen, Kåsastul)
Heim (Bürgler, Pestoni) (PP) – 53:44	6–3
Kneubuehler (Formenton, Zwerger) – 56:59	7–3

10 min
Penalties
10 min
26
Shots
29

=== Group Cattini ===
Pos	Team	Pld	W	OTW	OTL	L	GF	GA	GD	Pts	Qualification
1	(Czech Republic) HC Sparta Praha	2	2	0	0	0	12	4	+8	6	Semifinals
2	(Switzerland) HC Davos (H)	2	1	0	0	1	4	10	−6	3	Quarterfinals
3	Team Canada	2	0	0	0	2	3	5	−2	0	Quarterfinals

(H) Host

26 December 2022; 20:15	HC Sparta Praha (Czech Republic)	3–2 (2–0, 1–2, 0–0)	Team Canada	Eisstadion Davos; Attendance: 5,859

Game reference

Josef Kořenář
Goalies
Michael Hutchinson
Referees:
(United States) Mark Lemelin
(Switzerland) Miroslav Stolc
Linesmen:
(Switzerland) Dominik Altmann
(Switzerland) Zachary Steenstra

Řepík (Mikliš) – 18:11	1–0
Přibyl (M. Vitouch, Moravčík) – 18:41	2–0
Řepík (Přibyl, Jandus) (PP) – 27:20	3–0
	3–1	28:40 – Connolly (Grégoire, Eakin)
	3–2	34:53 – Connolly (Carr, Grégoire)

6 min
Penalties
12 min
19
Shots
30

27 December 2022; 20:15	HC Davos (Switzerland)	2–1 (2–0, 0–1, 0–0)	Team Canada	Eisstadion Davos; Attendance: 6,267

Game reference

Sandro Aeschlimann
Goalies
Connor Hughes
Referees:
(Finland) Mikko Kaukokari
(Switzerland) Marc Wiegand
Linesmen:
(Switzerland) David Obwegeser
(Switzerland) Zachary Steenstra

Rowe (Corvi) – 00:31	1–0
Bristedt (Rasmussen) – 01:55	2–0
	2–1	37:16 – Connolly (Kalynuk, Grégoire)

4 min
Penalties
8 min
24
Shots
29

28 December 2022; 20:15	HC Sparta Praha (Czech Republic)	9–2 (2–1, 4–0, 3–1)	(Switzerland) HC Davos	Eisstadion Davos; Attendance: 6,267

Game reference

Jakub Kovář
Goalies
Gilles Senn
Referees:
(United States) Mark Lemelin
(Switzerland) Miroslav Stolc
Linesmen:
(Switzerland) Dominik Altmann
(Switzerland) David Obwegeser

Kempný (E. Thorell) – 01:23	1–0
Safin (Moravčík, D. Vitouch) – 10:55	2–0
	2–1	19:53 – Stránský (Fora, Corvi)
Kempný (Sobotka, Horák) (SH) – 21:44	3–1
Buchtele (D. Vitouch, Kempný) – 25:23	4–1
Horák (Tomášek, E. Thorell) – 32:11	5–1
D. Vitouch (Jandus, Buchtele) – 32:54	6–1
Řepík (Tomášek, Kempný) (PP) – 44:40	7–1
Dvořáček (Konečný, G. Thorell) – 46:39	8–1
Horák (Přibyl, G. Thorell) – 54:37	9–1
	9–2	59:39 – Ambühl (Saarela)

6 min
Penalties
4 min
29
Shots
20

== Knockout stage ==
=== Bracket ===
Quarterfinals
29 December
T2 (Sweden) Örebro HK	3
C3 Team Canada	1
29 December
C2 (Switzerland) HC Davos	3
T3 (Finland) HIFK Hockey	2

Semifinals
30 December
C1 (Czech Republic) HC Sparta Praha	4
T2 (Sweden) Örebro HK	3
30 December
T1 (Switzerland) HC Ambrì-Piotta	5
C2 (Switzerland) HC Davos	0

Final
31 December
C1 (Czech Republic) HC Sparta Praha	2
T1 (Switzerland) HC Ambrì-Piotta (GWS)	3

=== Quarterfinals ===
29 December 2022; 15:10	Örebro HK (Sweden)	3–1 (1–0, 0–0, 2–1)	Team Canada	Eisstadion Davos; Attendance: 5,422

Game reference

Jonas Arntzen
Goalies
Michael Hutchinson
Referees:
(Finland) Mikko Kaukokari
(Switzerland) Miroslav Stolc
Linesmen:
(Switzerland) Dominik Altmann
(Switzerland) Zachary Steenstra

Berglund (Ābols, Holm) (PP) – 12:00	1–0
Öberg (Näkyvä) (SH) – 40:21	2–0
	2–1	53:26 – DiDomenico (Beaudin)
Bromé (Mastomäki) (ENG) – 59:34	3–1

12 min
Penalties
37 min
30
Shots
35

29 December 2022; 20:15	HC Davos (Switzerland)	3–2 (1–1, 1–0, 1–1)	(Finland) HIFK Hockey	Eisstadion Davos; Attendance: 6,267

Game reference

Sandro Aeschlimann
Goalies
Roope Taponen
Referees:
(Switzerland) Cedric Borga
(Switzerland) Marc Wiegand
Linesmen:
(Switzerland) Eric Cattaneo
(Switzerland) David Obwegeser

	0–1	07:48 – Vesalainen (Larsson, Palola)
Stránský (D. Egli) (PP) – 11:19	1–1
Ambühl (Dahlbeck, Corvi) – 26:43	2–1
	2–2	41:04 – Koivistoinen (Hirvonen, Nättinen)
Wieser (Corvi, Rowe) – 53:09	3–2

6 min
Penalties
10 min
27
Shots
29

=== Semifinals ===
30 December 2022; 15:10	HC Sparta Praha (Czech Republic)	4–3 (0–1, 4–2, 0–0)	(Sweden) Örebro HK	Eisstadion Davos; Attendance: 6,267

Game reference

Josef Kořenář
Goalies
Jhonas Enroth
Referees:
(United States) Mark Lemelin
(Switzerland) Marc Wiegand
Linesmen:
(Switzerland) Eric Cattaneo
(Switzerland) David Obwegeser

	0–1	03:28 – Bromé (Ābols, Wikman)
	0–2	22:23 – Näkyvä (Howden, Karlsson)
	0–3	29:31 – Rissanen (Howden)
Dvořáček (Konečný, Moravčík) – 30:02	1–3
Forman (Přibyl, Jandus) – 34:40	2–3
Buchtele (Mikliš) – 37:38	3–3
Tomášek (E. Thorell) – 39:19	4–3

8 min
Penalties
6 min
19
Shots
23

30 December 2022; 20:15	HC Ambrì-Piotta (Switzerland)	5–0 (2–0, 1–0, 2–0)	(Switzerland) HC Davos	Eisstadion Davos; Attendance: 6,267

Game reference

Janne Juvonen
Goalies
Sandro Aeschlimann
Referees:
(Sweden) Mikael Nord
(Switzerland) Miroslav Stolc
Linesmen:
(Sweden) Anders Nyqvist
(Finland) Hannu Sormunen

McMillan (Kneubuehler, Fohrler) – 03:03	1–0
Bürgler (Formenton, Zwerger) (PP2) – 15:25	2–0
Chlapík (SH) – 36:46	3–0
Eggenberger (Heed, Špaček) – 47:12	4–0
Pestoni (Burren, Heed) (ENG) – 57:42	5–0

16 min
Penalties
14 min

=== Final ===
31 December 2022; 12:10	HC Sparta Praha (Czech Republic)	2–3 GWS (1–1, 0–1, 1–0) (OT: 0–0) (SO: 0–1)	(Switzerland) HC Ambrì-Piotta	Eisstadion Davos; Attendance: 6,267

Game reference

Jakub Kovář
Goalies
Janne Juvonen
Referees:
(Finland) Mikko Kaukokari
(Sweden) Mikael Nord
Linesmen:
(Sweden) Anders Nyqvist
(Finland) Hannu Sormunen

	0–1	05:45 – Formenton (Chlapík, Špaček)
Tomášek (Moravčík, Tomek) – 06:35	1–1
	1–2	23:51 – Formenton (Heed) (SH)
Horák (E. Thorell, Jandus) – 53:53	2–2

Tomášek (miss)
Řepík (miss)
Přibyl (miss)
Horák (miss)
E. Thorell
Shootout
(miss) Heed
Bürgler
(miss) Formenton
(miss) Chlapík
Pestoni
8 min
Penalties
4 min

== All-Star Team ==
Position	Player	Team
Goaltender	(Finland) Janne Juvonen	(Switzerland) HC Ambrì-Piotta
Defencemen	(Czech Republic) Michal Kempný	(Czech Republic) HC Sparta Praha
Defencemen	(Sweden) Filip Berglund	(Sweden) Örebro HK
Forwards	(Canada) Brett Connolly	Team Canada
Forwards	(Czech Republic) Michael Špaček	(Switzerland) HC Ambrì-Piotta
Forwards	(Czech Republic) Roman Horák	(Czech Republic) HC Sparta Praha
