= Brind'Amour =

Brind'Amour is a French Canadian surname. Notable people with the surname include:

- Michael Brind'Amour, Canadian lawyer, chair of Hockey Canada from 2018 to 2022
- Pamela Brind'Amour (born 1993), Canadian fencer
- Pierre Brind'Amour (1941–1995), Canadian philologist
- Rod Brind'Amour (born 1970), Canadian ice hockey player and coach
- Skyler Brind'Amour (born 1999), American ice hockey player and son of Rod Brind'Amour
- Yvette Brind'Amour (1918–1991), Canadian actress

== See also ==
- Brind
- Amour (disambiguation)
