= 1939–40 Bohemian-Moravian Hockey League season =

Hockey season

The 1939-40 Bohemian-Moravian Hockey League season was the first season of the Bohemian-Moravian Hockey League. The Bohemian Championship had been contested the previous year. Four teams participated in the league, and LTC Prag won the championship.

== Regular season ==
Pl.	Team	GP.	W	T	L	GF–GA	Pts.
1.	LTC Prag	3	3	0	0	22-2	6
2.	SK Horácká Slavia Třebíč	3	2	0	1	8-12	4
3.	AC Sparta Prag	3	1	0	2	3-3	2
4.	ČSK Vítkovice	3	0	0	3	1-17	0
