= Alex Formenton =

Canadian ice hockey player (born 1999)

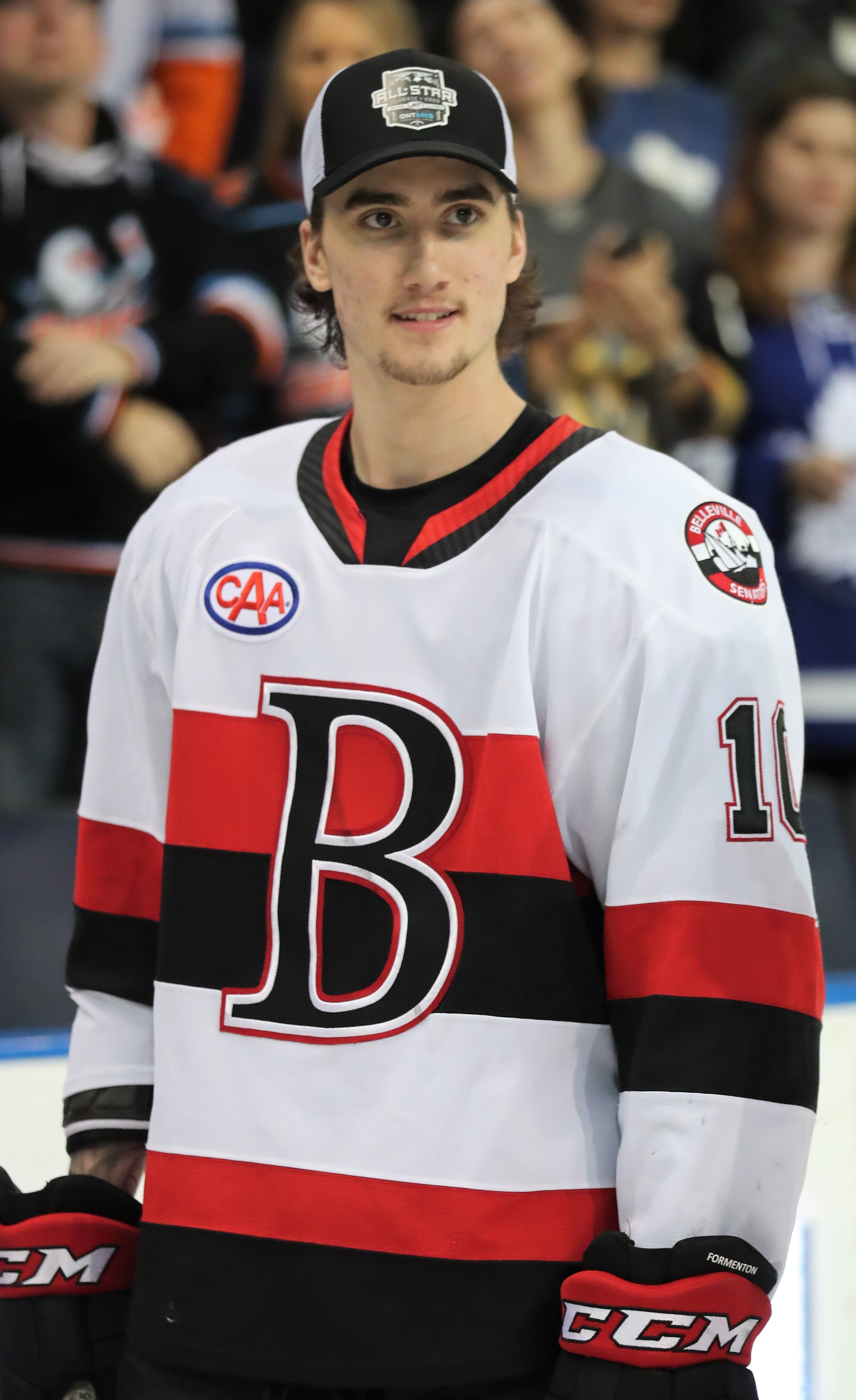
- Formenton with the Belleville Senators in 2020
- Born: September 13, 1999 (age 27) Barrie, Ontario, Canada
- Height: 6 ft 3 in (191 cm)
- Weight: 193 lb (88 kg; 13 st 11 lb)
- Position: Left wing
- Shoots: Left
- NHL team Former teams: Edmonton Oilers; Ottawa Senators; HC Ambrì-Piotta
- NHL draft: 47th overall, 2017; Ottawa Senators
- Playing career: 2017–present

Alex Formenton (born September 13, 1999) is a Canadian professional ice hockey player who is a left winger for the Edmonton Oilers of the National Hockey League (NHL). Formenton has also played for the Ottawa Senators of the NHL and HC Ambrì-Piotta of the National League (NL). He won a gold medal with Canada's junior team at the 2018 World Junior Championships. He was selected by the Senators in the second round of the 2017 NHL entry draft. He also won the 2022 Spengler Cup with HC Ambrì-Piotta. In 2025, Formenton was legally acquitted after being charged in the 2018 Hockey Canada controversy and sexual assault.

== Early life ==
Formenton was born in Barrie, Ontario, on September 13, 1999. Formenton's early years were spent in the York area, and for the 2015–16 season he played for the Aurora Tigers of the Ontario Junior Hockey League. In his childhood, Formenton's mother cared for two adult brothers with autism and Down syndrome. Formenton spent time with them while his mother cared for them. While playing for the London Knights, he billeted with a family that included a girl with Down syndrome. He has attributed these experiences to his desire to "seek out some sort of cause or charity that helps people who have Down syndrome or autism".

== Playing career ==
=== Amateur ===
Formenton was selected by the London Knights of the Ontario Hockey League (OHL) in the eleventh round, 216th overall, of the 2015 priority draft. Formenton made his major junior hockey debut with the Knights in the 2016–17 season and recorded 16 goals and 18 assists for 34 points in 65 games. Formenton was selected to play in the 2017 CHL Top Prospects Game. The Knights qualified for the 2017 OHL playoffs and advanced to the conference semifinals, losing to the Erie Otters. Formenton went scoreless in 14 playoff games. He returned to London for the 2017–18 season and appeared in 48 games, scoring 29 goals and 48 points. The Knights made the playoffs again, but were knocked out in the first round by the Owen Sound Attack. Formenton tallied five goals and seven points in the four game series.

He returned to London in late November for the 2018–19 season. He recorded 13 goals and 34 points in 31 games. The Knights made the 2019 OHL playoffs and advanced to the conference semifinals only to be eliminated by the Guelph Storm. Formenton added four goals and 18 points in 11 playoff games.

=== Professional ===
==== Ottawa Senators ====
The Ottawa Senators of the National Hockey League (NHL) selected Formenton in the second round, 47th overall, of the 2017 NHL entry draft. Formenton was invited to the Senators' main training camp after attending its development camp in mid 2017. At the end of training camp, Ottawa retained him on its NHL roster to open the 2017–18 season and signed him to a three-year entry-level contract. Formenton made his NHL debut on October 7, 2017, becoming the youngest player to play a game for the contemporary Senators franchise. He was a healthy scratch after that game, and on October 15, he was returned by the Senators to continue his development with the London Knights. After the OHL season ended in 2018, Formenton was reassigned to the Ottawa's American Hockey League (AHL) affiliate, the Belleville Senators. Formenton made two appearances with Belleville.

Formenton earned a spot on the Senators' roster for the 2018–19 season. On October 30, Formenton scored his first career NHL goal against Arizona Coyotes goaltender Antti Raanta, the lone Senators goal in a 5–1 loss. He was returned to London in November after appearing in nine games, scoring the one goal. After making the Senators out of training camp for two straight seasons, but failing to stick with the team for the 2019–20 season, Formenton was assigned to Belleville to help round out his game. Before the season was cancelled due to the COVID-19 pandemic, Formenton scored 27 goals and 53 points in 61 games with Belleville. Formenton was selected to represent Belleville at the 2020 AHL All-Star Classic. He was named to the AHL's All-Rookie Team alongside teammate Josh Norris. In the pandemic-shortened 2020–21 season, Formenton split time between Ottawa and Belleville, recording four goals and six points in 20 games in the NHL and four goals in 13 games in the AHL. Throughout the season, Formenton struggled with the effects of an illness that affected his play.

Formenton played with Ottawa for the 2021–22 season, establishing himself as a solid penalty killer. In November, Formenton contracted COVID-19 and was placed in the NHL's COVID-19 protocol. He finished the season with 18 goals and 32 points in 79 games.

==== HC Ambrì-Piotta ====
After his contract expired following the 2021–22 season, the Senators and Formenton could not agree to terms on a new contract. Remaining unsigned and later becoming ineligible to appear in the 2022–23 NHL season, Formenton belatedly signed with Swiss club HC Ambrì-Piotta of the National League (NL) on December 14, 2022. HC Ambrì-Piotta later issued a statement saying that their contract with Formenton would be re-evaluated at a later date should an investigation of an alleged 2018 sexual assault by members of the Canadian world junior team, of which Formenton was a member, reveal wrongdoing by the player. Senators General Manager Pierre Dorion did not clarify whether Formenton's contract status with the organization was related to the investigation, though some in the media stated that the investigation into Formenton's involvement was the reason for the contract stalemate. Canadian newspaper The London Free Press noted that it is "ultra-rare" for an NHL team to allow a top prospect like Formenton to be unsigned for an entire season. Heading into the 2023 NHL entry draft it was anticipated that the Senators would trade Formenton's rights to free up a spot on the club's reserve list, but Dorion was unable to find a trading partner.

In the 2022 Spengler Cup tournament, Formenton scored a tournament-high six points in four games, helping propel HC Ambrì-Piotta to a historic Spengler Cup victory. In defeating HC Sparta Prague by a 3–2 score, Ambrì became only the fourth Swiss team to win the cup in its 99-year history. In the 2022–23 season, Formenton recorded ten goals and 13 points in 22 games. He signed a two-month contract with HC Ambrì-Piotta ahead of the 2023–24 season that ended in December 2023. In 24 games, he added ten goals and 16 points. In the 2023 Spengler Cup tournament, HC Ambrì-Piotta sought to defend their title, but were knocked out in the opening round by Frölunda HC. For his play, Formenton was named to the tournament's all-star team. In March 2025, it was revealed that Formenton had begun working in construction in his home town.

After pausing his career due to legal issues in Canada, Formenton re-signed with HC Ambrì-Piotta in September 2025 to a contract lasting until December 2025. On September 11, 2025, the NHL announced Formenton would be eligible to sign a contract on October 15, and would be eligible to return to play on December 1. He made 42 appearances for the Swiss team, scoring 13 goals and 23 points.

==== Edmonton Oilers ====
On September 9, 2026, Formenton signed a one-year contract with the Edmonton Oilers, returning to the NHL. His signing was met with mixed reactions with Connor McDavid stating his support and Formenton receiving cheers from crowd following his pre-season goal. During the same pre-season game a protest was held across from Rogers Place who chanted "Formie's got to go, no means no." while a petition to have him removed from the team had almost reached 70,000 signatures by September 19. Oilers general manager Stan Bowman, acknowledged the reaction, claiming the team had done due diligence in the matter and foresaw Formenton as an "asset to the team". He made his debut for the Oilers on September 29 and registered his first point with the team, assisting on Evan Bouchard's second period goal in a 6–5 loss to the Vancouver Canucks. He marked his first goal with Edmonton on October 10 in a 3–1 victory over the San Jose Sharks.

== International play ==
Medal record

Representing Canada

Men's ice hockey

World Junior Championships
Gold medal – first place	2018 Canada	

Formenton, along with London Knights teammate Robert Thomas, was selected to represent Canada at the 2018 World Junior Championships, where he helped Canada win a gold medal. He would later be charged with sexual assault and acquitted along with four other Hockey Canada players, Carter Hart, Dillon Dubé, Michael McLeod, and Cal Foote arising from an alleged sexual assault that occurred at a team event in June 2018. In August 2026, it was reported that Formenton and the other players had been suspended from eligibility following a breach Hockey Canada code of conduct stemming from the alleged assault, however Formenton was reinstated that month.

== Legal matters ==
On January 24, 2024, Ambrì-Piotta announced that it had granted Formenton a leave of absence for personal reasons and that he would return to Canada. On January 28, Formenton surrendered himself to London police and he was charged in connection with an alleged sexual assault in 2018. Lawyers from the law firm Daniel Brown Law LLP represented Formenton throughout his criminal case. On February 5, the London Police Service announced that Formenton had been charged with one count of sexual assault. According to August 2024 court documents released the following month, Formenton had "moved on from a hockey career" and was working in construction. From April 22 to June 13, 2025, Ontario Superior Court Justice Maria Carroccia oversaw an eight-week trial. He pleaded not guilty. On July 24, Formenton was acquitted following the judge declaring that the evidence of the complainant, E.M. was not credible or reliable, and that "the Crown cannot meet its onus on any of the counts". Michael McLeod, Dillon Dubé, Carter Hart, and Cal Foote were also acquitted of sexual assault in the same case.

Justice Maria Carroccia ruled that:

"Although the slogan "Believe the victim" has become popularized of late, it has no place in a criminal trial. To approach a trial with the assumption that the complainant is telling the truth is the equivalent of imposing a presumption of guilt on the person accused of sexual assault and then placing a burden on him to prove his innocence. That is antithetical to the fundamental principles of justice enshrined in our constitution and the values underlying our free and democratic society."

In March 2025, Formenton's legal representation requested that an arbitrator's decision to dismiss claims of negligence, breach of contract, and breach of fiduciary duty by his former agency be set aside. In 2022, at the end of his entry-level contract, he was offered a qualifying offer by the Senators, which he rejected. Formenton claimed that he was not made aware by the agency that by rejecting the offer, he was not guaranteed the ability to negotiate a new contract the following season and that if he had accepted the initial qualifying offer, any potential career disruption, like the aforementioned trial, would allow for the extension of that contract. The agency refuted the claims. Formenton was seeking $20 million. The case was dismissed after an Ontario Superior Court judge ruled that an arbitrator appointed by the National Hockey League Players' Association correctly found the dispute was filed too late under the union's regulations.

== Career statistics ==
=== Regular season and playoffs ===
			Regular season					Playoffs
Season	Team	League	GP	G	A	Pts	PIM	GP	G	A	Pts	PIM
2014-15	Mississauga Rebels U18	AAA GTHL U18	65	27	28	55	92	-	-	-	-	-
2015–16	Aurora Tigers	OJHL	54	13	13	26	66	5	2	0	2	0
2016–17	London Knights	OHL	65	16	18	34	50	14	0	0	0	6
2017–18	Ottawa Senators	NHL	1	0	0	0	0	—	—	—	—	—
2017–18	London Knights	OHL	48	29	19	48	55	4	5	2	7	6
2017–18	Belleville Senators	AHL	2	0	0	0	2	—	—	—	—	—
2018–19	Ottawa Senators	NHL	9	1	0	1	6	—	—	—	—	—
2018–19	London Knights	OHL	31	13	21	34	50	11	4	14	18	14
2019–20	Belleville Senators	AHL	61	27	26	53	65	—	—	—	—	—
2020–21	Belleville Senators	AHL	13	4	0	4	22	—	—	—	—	—
2020–21	Ottawa Senators	NHL	20	4	2	6	6	—	—	—	—	—
2021–22	Ottawa Senators	NHL	79	18	14	32	59	—	—	—	—	—
2022–23	HC Ambrì-Piotta	NL	22	10	3	13	74	—	—	—	—	—
2023–24	HC Ambrì-Piotta	NL	24	10	6	16	24	—	—	—	—	—
2025–26	HC Ambrì-Piotta	NL	43	13	10	23	48	4	3	2	5	10
NHL totals			109	23	16	39	71	—	—	—	—	—

=== International ===
Year	Team	Event	Result	GP	G	A	Pts	PIM
2018	Canada	WJC	1st place, gold medalist(s)	7	2	2	4	8
Junior totals				7	2	2	4	8

== Awards and honours ==
Awards	Year
CHL Top Prospects Game	2017
AHL All-Star Game	2020
AHL All-Rookie Team	2020
Spengler Cup winner	2022
