= 1943–44 Bohemian-Moravian Hockey League season =

The 1943-44 Bohemian-Moravian Hockey League season was the fifth and final season of the Bohemian-Moravian Hockey League. Six teams participated in the league, and LTC Prag won the championship.

== Regular season ==
Pl.	Team	Sp.	S	U	N	Torv.	Pkt.
1.	LTC Prag	5	5	0	0	34-5	10
2.	I. ČLTK Prag	5	4	0	1	19-8	8
3.	SK Podolí Prag	5	3	0	2	18-17	6
4.	AC Sparta Prag	5	2	0	3	14-20	4
5.	AC Stadion České Budějovice	5	1	0	4	8-24	2
6.	SK Libeň	5	0	0	5	6-25	0

== Promotion ==
Semifinals:

- HC Stadion Prag – DSK Tábor 2:2 (re-play 4:1)
- SK Prostějov – DSK Třebíč 2:0

3rd place:

- DSK Tábor – DSK Třebíč 4:1

Final:

- SK Prostějov – HC Stadion Prag 1:0

SK Prostejov was promoted to the Bohemian-Moravian League for the 1944–45 season, which was not played. The team participated in the Czechoslovak Extraliga in the 1945–46 season.
