= Hockey Canada sexual assault scandal =

2022 Canadian ice hockey sexual assault scandal

Junior ice hockey players in Canada have been the subject of sexual assault investigations by police fifteen times since 1989. In 2022, Police investigated sexual assault allegations that occurred in 2003 and 2018.

In May 2022, it was reported that Hockey Canada—the governing body for the sport of ice hockey in Canada—had paid a settlement to a woman who alleged that she was the victim of a sexual assault perpetrated in 2018 by members of Canada's men's national junior team.

In June 2022, Minister for Sport Pascale St-Onge froze the federal government's funding of Hockey Canada, and called for an investigation into whether public funds were used to fund the settlement. The Standing Committee on Canadian Heritage also opened an inquiry into Hockey Canada's handling of the allegations, which revealed a history of sexual misconduct cases raised against the organization, and that the organization had spent C$7.6 million out of a "National Equity Fund"—funded partially via player registration fees—to help pay out settlements in 21 sexual misconduct cases since 1989.

In October 2022, The Globe and Mail reported that Hockey Canada had created a "Participants Legacy Trust Fund" in 1999 with money from the National Equity Fund, for distribution to its members for "matters including but not limited to sexual abuse". Hockey Canada has denied that the fund has been used, while Hockey Saskatchewan stated that it receives interest from the trust to cover operating costs. During continued hearings that month, interim Hockey Canada board chair Andrea Skinner stated that the settlement for the 2018 case was a means to resolve it in a "respectful" manner without a trial.

In the immediate wake of the scandal, most of Hockey Canada's corporate sponsors suspended their relationship with the organization, and the 2022 World Junior Ice Hockey Championships in Edmonton was held without sponsors. Hockey Canada stated that it would no longer use its National Equity Fund to fund sexual misconduct settlements, and later announced a plan to address "systemic issues" in the culture of hockey. Further scrutiny emerged amid the October 2022 allegations, with Hockey Québec announcing that it will not send registration fees to Hockey Canada amid a lack of confidence for its proposed reforms, multiple sponsors continuing their suspension of sponsorship for its men's hockey programming, and retail chain Canadian Tire permanently ending their sponsorship of the organization.

The government spoke of resuming funding in April 2023, and Hockey Canada announced the "Beyond the Boards Summit" to make hockey a positive experience for participants, and changing hockey culture. In July 2023, Katherine Henderson was named the first female president in Hockey Canada's history, and Bauer Hockey subsequently reinstated its sponsorship.

In 2025, the criminal trial of the five players from the 2018 World Junior team, Michael McLeod, Alex Formenton, Carter Hart, Dillon Dubé, and Cal Foote, ended with their acquittal by a judge.

== Incidents of allegations of sexual assault ==
=== 2003 incident ===
Halifax Regional Police started investigating allegations of a group sexual assault from 2003, and have the names of two suspects. The alleged incident happened when Team Canada was in Halifax for the finals in January 2003, where the team won a silver medal.

Hockey Canada hired Jennifer White, a lawyer and investigator, as a third party investigator to look into the allegations in 2022.

=== 2018 incidents ===
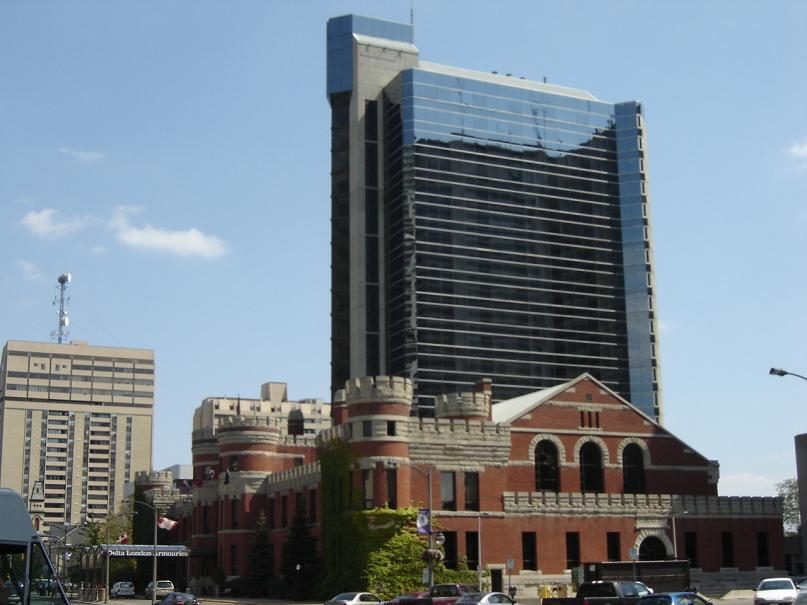
London Delta Armouries Hotel

The 2018 World Junior Ice Hockey Championships took place from December 26, 2017, to January 5, 2018. The gold-winning Canadian team then attended the Hockey Canada Foundation Gala & Golf event on June 18, 2018, where shortly after, an alleged group assault in London, Ontario, took place. Up to eight people were believed to have been involved, and police insisted they had reasonable grounds to believe that five members of the 2018 Canada World Juniors sexually assaulted an unnamed woman in a local hotel room.

In April 2022, a woman identified as "E.M." filed a statement of claim against Hockey Canada and the Canadian Hockey League (CHL), alleging an incident of sexual assault perpetrated on June 19, 2018. E.M., who was 20 at the time of the incident, alleged that she had been intoxicated by a defendant identified as "John Doe 1" at Jack's Bar in London, Ontario, and taken to a room in the London Delta Armouries Hotel. After E.M. engaged in sexual intercourse with John Doe 1, four men entered the room and allegedly assaulted E.M. The specific players were not identified, but it was stated that the group included members of Canada's gold medal-winning 2018 World Junior Championship team.

E.M. alleged that Hockey Canada had refused to investigate or reprimand the players in question, and sought C$3.55 million in damages. The London Police Service had closed a criminal investigation into the incident in February 2019 without laying charges. The investigation was reopened by the London Police Service in the summer of 2022 after news that Hockey Canada paid an undisclosed settlement to the complainant. According to the lawsuit, the woman first met the players at a bar in London, Ontario, where a player referred to as John Doe 1 bought her alcoholic drinks. The woman became more intoxicated and eventually went to a hotel with John Doe 1. Once in John Doe 1's hotel room, the two engaged in sexual acts, where after John Doe 1 invited the rest of the John Doe Defendants into the room without the Plaintiff's knowledge or consent. John Doe 1, later identified as Michael McLeod, invited his teammates to the hotel room with a group chat message, "Who wants to be in a three-way quick Room 209, (signed) Mikey."

The Plaintiff claimed that over the next several hours, John Does 1–8 engaged in several sexual acts "which collectively constituted sexual abuse and assault." In addition, the woman states that she could not give consent to any of the actions because of how intoxicated she was and that the group of eight (John Does 1–8) would not let her leave the room, despite multiple attempts by E.M. Lawyers representing the players released text messages and videos to The Globe and Mail alleging that the woman consented to sexual acts with John Does 1–8.

The allegations were made public in a complaint filed April 2022 in Ontario Superior Court. The lawsuit was filed against Hockey Canada, the CHL, and eight unnamed CHL players. The complainant stated in the complaint that those involved were "players for, and members of the CHL and Hockey Canada, including but not limited to members of the Canada U20 Men's Junior Hockey Team."

In May 2022, Rick Westhead of TSN reported that Hockey Canada and the CHL had agreed to settle the lawsuit.

On July 26, 2022, a previously agreed upon non-disclosure agreement between the complainant and Hockey Canada was dropped. A day later, Hockey Canada's executives, headed by former Hockey Canada president Scott Smith, testified before a parliamentary committee as to the organization's handling of the alleged sexual assault case, which included questions about the NDA.

As of September 2022, the incident was under investigation by London police, Hockey Canada, and the National Hockey League (NHL). In December 2022, Hockey Canada stated that it had received Henein Hutchinson's report but that it would remain private. However, on March 27, 2023, the House of Commons Heritage Committee unanimously passed a motion ordering the report to be handed over within 24 hours with an amendment from Liberal MP Chris Bittle to have the report redacted for privacy purposes.

=== Backlash ===
Media reports revealed Hockey Canada maintained a reserve fund called the National Equity Fund drawing on minor hockey membership fees that was partially used to settle sexual misconduct cases, causing a public uproar.

Top sponsors, including Tim Hortons, Canadian Tire, Scotiabank, and Imperial Oil (which markets the Esso brand in Canada), withdrew support from the 2023 World Juniors and the entire 2022–23 season.

The federal Minister for Sport, Pascale St-Onge, stripped Hockey Canada of federal funding and called for an audit of public funds, while Hockey Canada executives were questioned multiple times by parliament. The audit commissioned by the federal government found that Hockey Canada did not use public funds to settle sexual assault cases or pay for related legal fees.

=== Hockey Canada's response ===
Hockey Canada required all players to participate in its investigation into the alleged sexual assault and stated that those who do not will be banned from all Hockey Canada activities and programs immediately. In addition, Hockey Canada disallowed all players from the 2018 World Juniors Men's team from competing in international competition until the investigation and adjudicative process of the alleged sexual assault has been completed.

Additionally, the entire board of directors as well as president and CEO Scott Smith resigned in October 2022. On December 17, 2022, Hockey Canada elected a new board of directors. The board will serve a special one-year term in order to focus on creating necessary change to improve the governance at Hockey Canada. Since then, the newly installed board vowed to change the culture within the sport and the organization. Katherine Henderson was named Hockey Canada's new president and CEO in October 2023. Hockey Canada hired human rights leader Irfan Chaudhry as its first vice-president of diversity and inclusion.

== Parliamentary probe ==
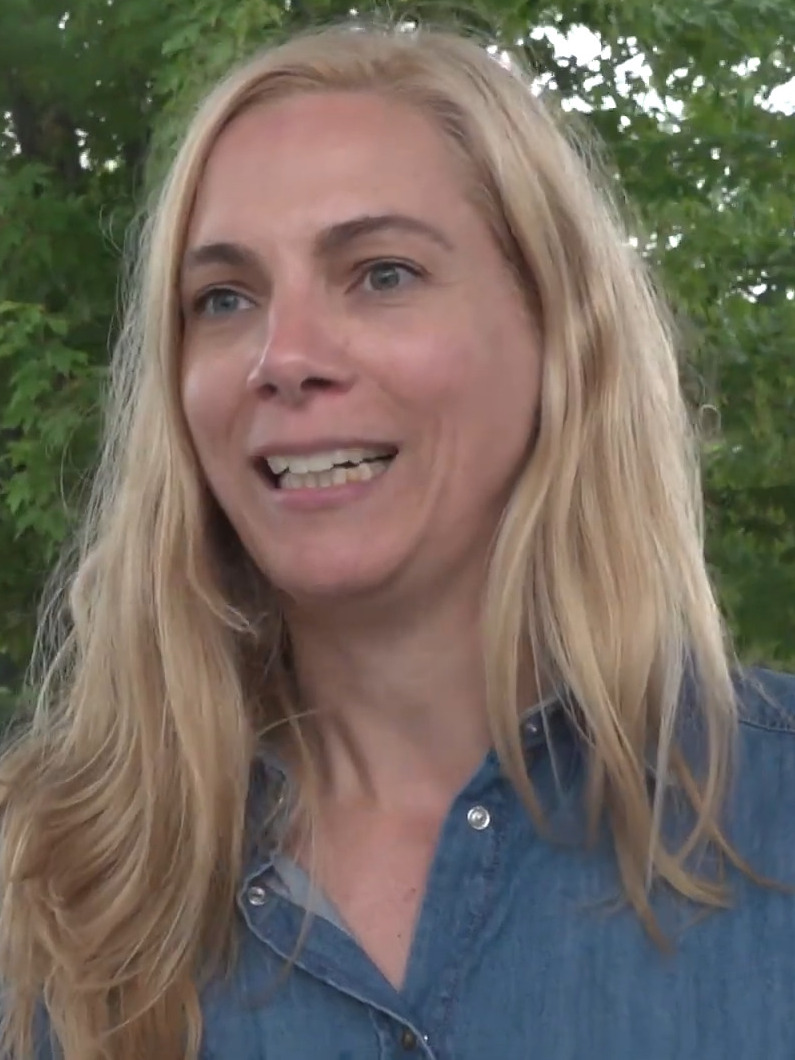
Pascale St-Onge at Halton Field Hockey Club, 2022

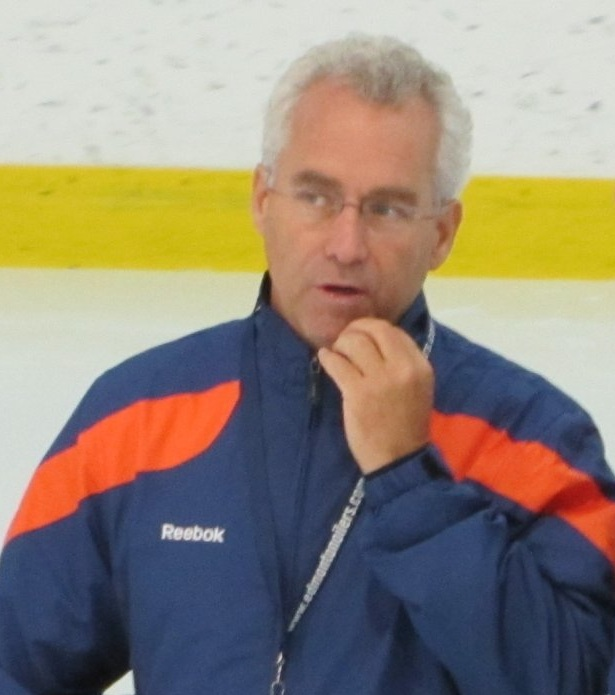
Tom Renney in 2011

In June 2022, Minister St-Onge called for a forensic audit into whether taxpayer funding was used to pay out sexual assault settlements. St-Onge also paused federal funding to Hockey Canada until it explained its response to the 2018 allegations. On June 20, 2022, the Standing Committee on Canadian Heritage opened an inquiry into Hockey Canada's handling of the 2018 allegations. Former Hockey Canada CEO Tom Renney, current CEO Scott Smith, and Hockey Canada Foundation chair Dave Andrews delivered testimony during the first day of the inquiry. The inquiry included claims that none of the players allegedly involved in the incident were compelled to participate in its investigations, and revealed that Hockey Canada had received one or two reports of assault per-year in the last five to six years. MP Anthony Housefather felt that keeping the accused players anonymous was "troubling", since "[potential] perpetrators of a criminal act" may still be playing, and possibly be in the NHL. Smith stated that Hockey Canada was "driven to change the culture in this game", stating that "one [case] in the last five to six years — not one to two each year, one in the last five to six years — is too many", and that four-to-six players declined to participate in the investigation.

In September 2022, NDP member of parliament Peter Julian requested a "thorough" audit into Hockey Canada's finances since 2016; he accused the organization of spending thousands of dollars on expensive dinner parties, hotel rooms, and championship rings for board members.

== Reserve funds ==
On July 18, 2022, it was reported that Hockey Canada had maintained a reserve to pay for "uninsured liabilities", including "potential claims for historical sexual abuse". The information was contained within an affidavit filed in an Ontario court in July 2021 by Hockey Canada's vice-president of insurance and risk management Glen McCurdie. Although Hockey Canada denies the reserve being a slush fund, reporters from CBC News, Toronto Star and The Athletic characterized the reserve functioning as a slush fund.

It was reported in The Globe and Mail that Hockey Canada had diverted player registration fees to a fund known as the National Equity Fund, which was worth approximately $15 million, to "pay out settlements in cases of alleged sexual assault without its insurance company, and with minimal outside scrutiny". In response, Hockey Canada issued a statement regarding this reserve, referring the "National Equity Fund", and stating that it was used primarily "to pay for the organization's insurance premiums and to cover any claims not otherwise covered by insurance policies, including those related to physical injury, harassment, and sexual misconduct."

On July 27, 2022, Smith testified to the Heritage Committee that between 1989 and the May 2022 settlement, Hockey Canada spent $8.9 million to settle 21 sexual misconduct lawsuits. $6.8 million of this total was paid out to settle cases surrounding sexual abuse by junior hockey coach Graham James, and $7.6 million of this total had been funded from the National Equity Fund.

On October 3, 2022, The Globe and Mail reported that Hockey Canada had created a "Participants Legacy Trust Fund" in 1999, to distribute funding to its member organizations for "matters including but not limited to sexual abuse". Funded with at least $7.1 million from the National Equity Fund, it had been created to cover claims from between 1989 and 1995, before Hockey Canada had obtained insurance for sexual assault claims. The trust was to expire in May 2020, but filings in the Court of King's Bench of Alberta revealed that it had been extended to 2039; in a January 2019 affidavit, Hockey Canada CFO Brian Cairo stated that "the trustees believe that more claims will be brought after the Division Date as currently defined, and this is the primary reason to extend the duration of the trust".

== Responses, reactions and outcomes ==
Hockey broadcaster Paul Romanuk noted the significance of the settlement first being reported by a writer for TSN—Hockey Canada's long-time media partner—telling the Toronto Star that "[the World Junior Championship] is associated with TSN as a brand, massively. You have to give so much credit to the person or persons who green-lighted Rick [Westhead] to continue with his uncovering of the story."

=== July–September 2022 ===
After the existence of the reserve fund was revealed, Hockey Canada issued a letter stating that it planned to reopen its investigation into the 2018 incident, admitting that "we know we have not done enough to address the actions of some members of the 2018 national junior team or to end the culture of toxic behaviour within our game." On July 19, 2022, Prime Minister Justin Trudeau remarked that he found it "hard for anyone" to trust Hockey Canada, stating that he understood "why so many Canadians who take such pride in our national winter sport are absolutely disgusted by what's going on." On July 20, Hockey Canada stated that it will only use the National Equity Fund for investments in insurance, safety, wellness, and equity initiatives moving forward.

In further remarks on July 21, Trudeau stated that "there needs to be a real reckoning with what we saw from that organization, and the wilful blindness to something that other organizations have been faced with—struggled with—but made good decisions around." During the committee hearings, Smith stated that he would not step down as president and CEO of Hockey Canada, explaining that he would "not walk away from the demands you have rightly put before us".

On July 25, 2022, Hockey Canada published an "Action Plan" to address "systemic issues in hockey", including "toxic" behaviour and the "culture of silence that exists in corners of the game". The plan includes the development of a confidential reporting system for "complaints of maltreatment, abuse or harassment" among the participants of activities sanctioned by Hockey Canada, an "enhanced character screening for all high-performance players", and a "comprehensive review of all existing training programs by an independent specialist." Hockey Canada's board of directors will appoint an independent committee to oversee the implementation plan. Hockey Canada hired crisis management and public relations firm Navigator Ltd. On July 29, 2022, the Ontario Hockey Federation (OHF) issued a request to Hockey Canada board chair Michael Brind’Amour, that it not collect the "Participant Assessment Fee" from its players for the 2022–23 season.

On August 6, 2022, Brind'Amour stepped down effective immediately; Andrea Skinner was appointed as an interim chair on August 9. On August 11, Hockey Canada posted a job opening for a new position of "director of maltreatment, harassment and abuse.

A Nanos Research poll concluding in early-August found that "fewer than one in 10 Canadians polled supported using player registration fees to settle sexual assault claims." In a poll by the Angus Reid Institute, 80% of respondents supported the federal government's suspension of funding to Hockey Canada, 63% of respondents felt that Hockey Canada needed new senior leadership, and 58% of respondents—including 62% of women surveyed—doubted whether the organization's Action Plan would have any meaningful impact on the culture of hockey and the treatment of women and girls.

Amid the scandal, almost all of Hockey Canada's premier marketing partners announced that they would suspend their activities with the organization, including BDO, Canadian Tire Corporation, General Motors Canada (via the Chevrolet marque), Imperial Oil (via the Esso brand), Recipe Unlimited, Scotiabank, Telus, and Tim Hortons. Furthermore, Canadian Tire pulled its financial support of the 2023 World Junior Ice Hockey Championships in Halifax/Moncton. The 2022 World Junior Championships in Edmonton—which had been curtailed and rescheduled to August 2022 due to the COVID-19 pandemic—subsequently featured no in-arena sponsorships besides that of IIHF global sponsor Tissot. Attendance for the tournament was also much lower than previous editions of the tournament, which are normally held during the winter holiday season. Media outlets credited the rescheduling, the Hockey Canada scandal, as well as the removal and replacement of Russia with Latvia due to the Russian invasion of Ukraine, as possible factors in the decline.

=== October 2022 ===
The report of the Participants Legacy Trust Fund led to further scrutiny, with critics accusing Hockey Canada of lacking transparency. Hockey Canada denied the report, stating that the fund had never been used, and was not considered to be an asset because it is intended for Hockey Canada's members. During hearings on October 4, 2022, Skinner stated that the May 2022 settlement was conducted at the advice of its legal counsel; the board wanted to resolve the case in a "respectful", "victim-centred" manner, with concern that a trial process could be traumatizing to the plaintiff. MPs subsequently characterized the settlement as hush money.

Smith stated that the Hockey Canada board "does not share the view" that they needed to make any further leadership changes, and were confident that their existing team had the "skills" needed to implement their Action Plan. Skinner stated that she didn't expect to be "involved in politics" or become "a lightning rod for extremists" in her role as interim board chair, and accused the media and politicians of "suggesting that toxic behaviour is somehow a specific hockey problem", and "scapegoat[ing] hockey as a centrepiece for toxic culture".

In the wake of these developments, Hockey Québec and Hockey Nova Scotia both announced that they would withhold player registration fees from Hockey Canada for the 2022–23 season; Hockey Québec stated that its board had no confidence that Hockey Canada could "act effectively to change the culture of hockey with the structure in place". The OHF's executive director Phillip McKee once again asked Hockey Canada to not collect Participant Assessment Fees from Ontario players for the 2022–23 season, stating that their request had not been directed to Hockey Canada's board before Brind'Amour's resignation, and that the OHF were "unwavering in our commitment to ensure that the game of hockey is available to all in a safe, fun and inclusive environment". By contrast, Hockey Saskatchewan issued a statement in support of Hockey Canada, denying that the Participants Legacy Trust Fund was a "second secret 'slush' fund", and explaining that it receives interest from the fund that helps to "maintain the current fees charged to participants in the province."

All of Hockey Canada's premier marketing partners, also including Nike Inc. and SkipTheDishes, reaffirmed their suspension of support for Hockey Canada's men's hockey program and events for the 2022–23 season. A Tim Hortons representative stated that the organization "needs to take strong and definitive action before it can regain the faith and trust of Canadians", and that the company will still sponsor its youth, women's, and sledge hockey programs. On October 6, Canadian Tire announced that it would permanently cut ties with Hockey Canada for "continu[ing] to resist meaningful change", stating that the company was "committed to supporting hockey and sport that is inclusive and safe for all Canadians".

Also on October 6, Trudeau said that Hockey Canada "need to realize that if we have to create an organization, get rid of Hockey Canada, and create an organization called 'Canada Hockey' instead, people will look at doing that."

On October 8, Skinner resigned as interim board chair of Hockey Canada. Amid calls for leadership change of Hockey Canada, Scott Smith and the entire board of directors departed on October 11, 2022.

=== 2023 ===
On March 27, 2023, Hockey Canada suspended each member of the 2018 World Junior team from international competitions until investigations were complete.

The Government of Canada stated its intent to resume funding Hockey Canada in April 2023, on the proviso that the governing body took satisfactory action to address sexual abuse in the sport. In June 2023, Hockey Canada announced the "Beyond the Boards Summit" to be held in September. The summit will discuss ways to make hockey a positive experience for participants; and changing current hockey culture which includes "elitism, gender-based violence, homophobia, misogyny, racism and sexism".

In July 2023, Hockey Canada announced Katherine Henderson as its first female president and CEO. After the announcement, Bauer Hockey reinstated its sponsorship of Hockey Canada. Later the same month, Nike announced its sponsorship of Hockey Canada would not resume.

Hockey Canada established Sports Complaints in July 2022, as an independent third party to handle maltreatment complaints by a trauma-informed processes. Hockey Canada also affiliated with the Office of the Sport Integrity Commissioner, as a condition of federal funding being restored in October 2022. According to Hockey Canada, Sport Complaints is led by two lawyers and staffed by "diverse professionals reflecting both gender and racial diversity".

=== 2025 criminal trial ===
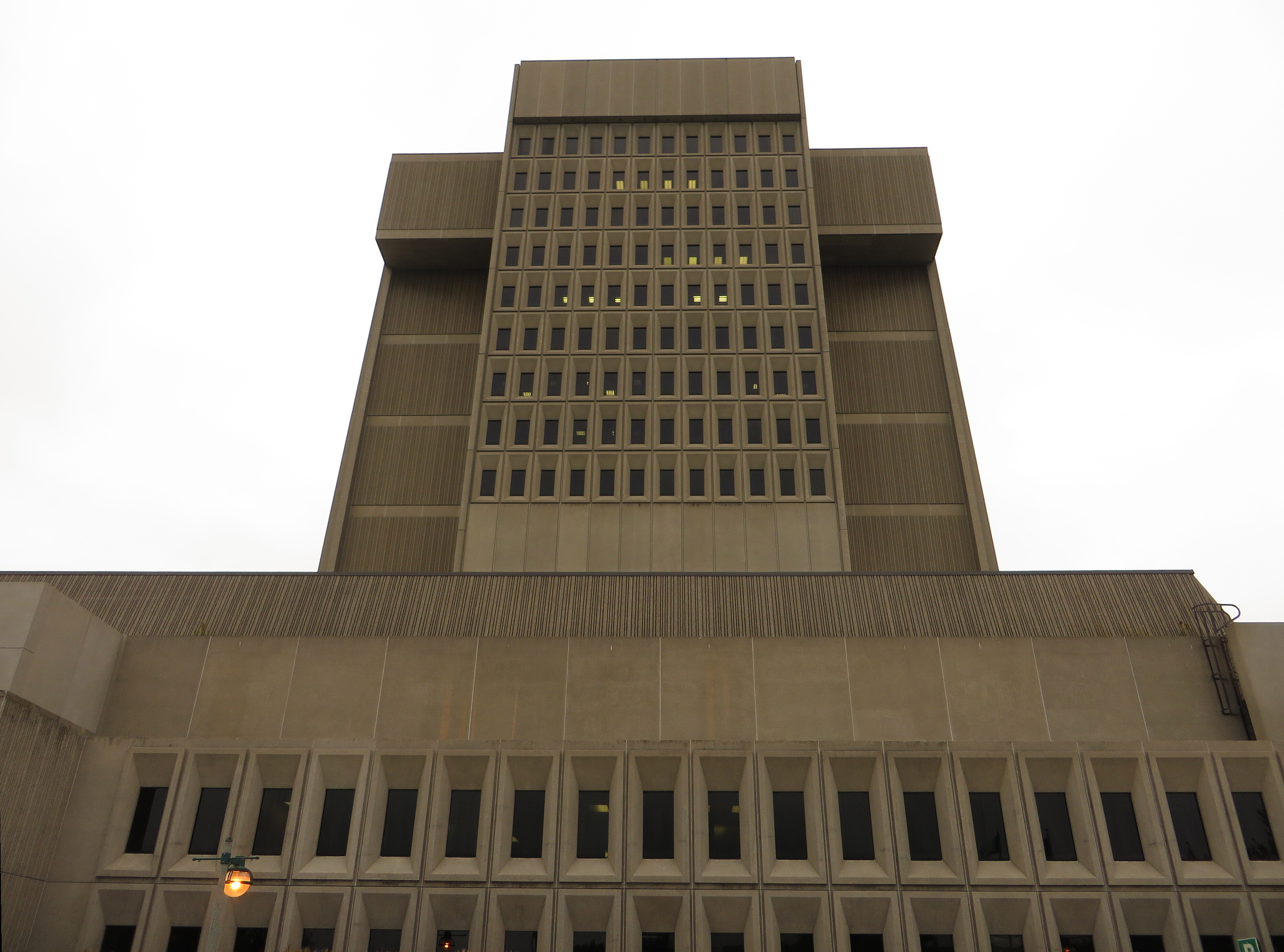
Ontario Court of Justice building, located in downtown London

On January 24, 2024, The Globe and Mail, citing unnamed sources, reported that five members of the team had been told to surrender to London police. On January 28, Alex Formenton surrendered himself; two days later, on January 30, Carter Hart, Dillon Dubé, Michael McLeod, and Cal Foote were formally charged in Canada with sexual assault. Michael McLeod was charged with two counts of sexual assault and the other four players were charged with one count of sexual assault.

From April 22 to June 13, 2025, Ontario Superior Court Justice Maria Carroccia oversaw an eight-week trial of Formenton, Hart, Dubé, McLeod, and Foote. In its first few days, the court recessed for a short period, before Justice Carroccia returned and declared a mistrial. The existing jury was let go and a new trial date was set. The reason for the mistrial was not given due to a publication ban put in place by the judge. A new jury was selected later that day and the second trial began on April 28. All five defendants pleaded not guilty. On May 16, Justice Carroccia again dismissed the trial jury, citing jury prejudice against the defence. The jurors claimed that defence attorneys had belittled them, though this was refuted by the defence team, stating "No defense counsel would risk alienating a juror, and nothing could be further from the truth in this instance." With the jury dismissed, Justice Carroccia adjudicated the case on her own.

On July 24, all five defendants were found not guilty through acquittal with the judge stating, she did not find E.M.'s evidence "credible or reliable", and that "the Crown cannot meet its onus on any of the counts". In Justice Carroccia's ruling, she cited Justice Anne Molloy, quoting:

"Although the slogan "Believe the victim" has become popularized of late, it has no place in a criminal trial. To approach a trial with the assumption that the complainant is telling the truth is the equivalent of imposing a presumption of guilt on the person accused of sexual assault and then placing a burden on him to prove his innocence. That is antithetical to the fundamental principles of justice enshrined in our constitution and the values underlying our free and democratic society."

The acquitted players became unrestricted free agents were allowed to sign team contracts as of October 15, 2025, and be reinstated by the league as of December 1, 2025.

On August 12, 2026, Hockey Canada reinstated Formenton, while the others remained suspended until November 10 of varying years: Foote until 2026, Hart until 2027, Dubé until 2028, and McLeod until 2030.

== Depiction in media ==
The Fifth Estate published the documentary "Anatomy of a Scandal" on September 27, 2022, using public statements by team members of the 2018 Canada World Juniors team collected from a variety of published sources. On February 9, 2023, The Fifth Estate published a second part to the documentary, titled "Anatomy of a Scandal 2".

Code of Misconduct, a documentary film about the scandal by Sébastien Trahan, premiered at the 2026 Hot Docs Canadian International Documentary Festival.

== See also ==
- Misogyny in ice hockey
