= 1941–42 Bohemian-Moravian Hockey League season =

The 1941-42 Bohemian-Moravian Hockey League season was the third season of the Bohemian-Moravian Hockey League. Six teams participated in the league, and LTC Prag won the championship.

== Regular season ==
Pl.	Team	GP.	W	T	L	GF–GA	Pts.
1.	LTC Prag	5	5	0	0	24-10	10
2.	I. ČLTK Prag	5	4	0	1	22-7	8
3.	AC Sparta Prag	5	2	1	2	12-17	6
4.	ČSK Vítkovice	5	2	0	3	6-8	4
5.	AC Stadion České Budějovice	5	1	1	3	10-20	2
6.	SK Horácká Slavia Třebíč	5	0	0	5	3-21	0

== Promotion ==
Semifinals:

- SK Podolí Prag – CASK Písek 2:1 n.V.
- AFK Kolín – SK Viktoria Uherský Ostroh 2:4

Final:

- SK Podolí Prag – SK Viktoria Uherský Ostroh 3:0

SK Podoli Prag was promoted to the Bohemian-Moravian League for 1942–43.
