= 1940–41 Bohemian-Moravian Hockey League season =

The 1940-41 Bohemian-Moravian Hockey League season was the second season of the Bohemian-Moravian Hockey League. Six teams participated in the league, and I. CLTK Prag won the championship.

== Regular season ==
Pl.	Team	GP	W	T	L	GF–GA	Pts.
1.	I. ČLTK Prag	5	5	0	0	28-4	10
2.	LTC Prag	5	4	0	1	36-3	8
3.	AC Sparta Prag	5	3	0	2	10-12	6
4.	SK Horácká Slavia Třebíč	5	2	0	3	7-20	4
5.	ČSK Vítkovice	5	1	0	4	5-12	2
6.	SK Velké Popovice	5	0	0	5	3-38	0

== Promotion ==
Semifinals:

- AC Stadion České Budějovice – SK Podolí Prag 2:0
- SK Meteor Svobodné Dvory – SK Židenice 1:0 n.V.

Final:

- AC Stadion České Budějovice – SK Meteor Svobodné Dvory 3:1 n.V.

AC Stadion Ceske Budejovice was promoted to the Bohemian-Moravian League for 1941–42.
