= Michal Moravčík =

Czech ice hockey player (born 1994)

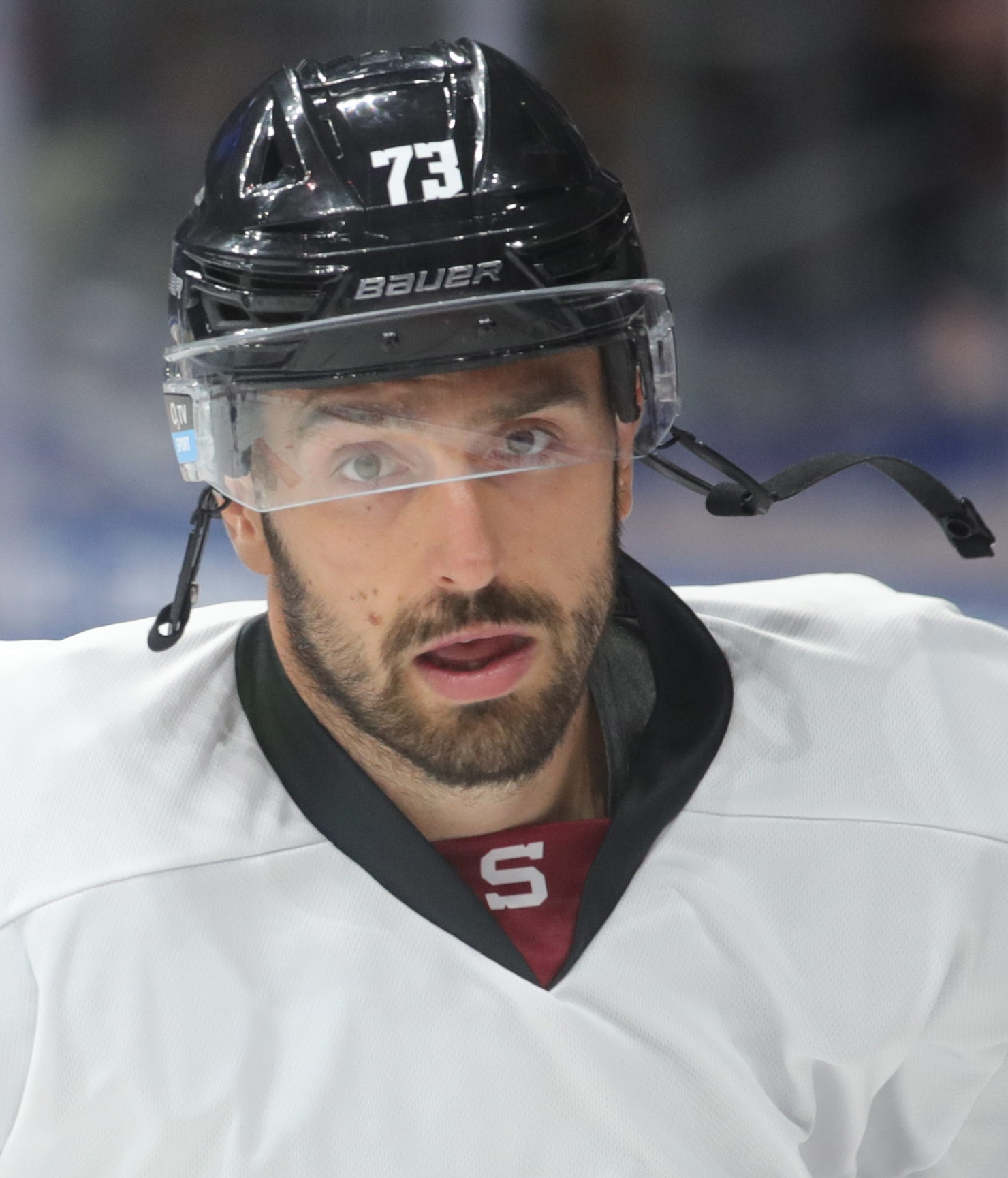
- Moravčík with HC Sparta Praha in August 2023
- Born: 7 December 1994 (age 31) Klatovy, Czech Republic
- Height: 6 ft 5 in (196 cm)
- Weight: 223 lb (101 kg; 15 st 13 lb)
- Position: Defence
- Shoots: Left
- ELH team Former teams: HC Sparta Praha; HC Plzeň; Laval Rocket; HC Litvínov; Tappara
- National team: Czech Republic
- NHL draft: Undrafted
- Playing career: 2012–present

Michal Moravčík (born 7 December 1994) is a Czech professional ice hockey player. He is currently playing under contract with HC Sparta Praha of the Czech Extraliga (ELH).

== Playing career ==
Moravčík made his debut playing in Czech Extraliga with HC Plzeň during the 2012–13 Czech Extraliga season.

In the 2017–18 season, Moravčík played in 52 games on the blueline for Plzeň, notching personal highs with 5 goals and 16 points and a plus-minus +25 rating. In the post-season he added three goals and 4 assists in 10 playoff games.

On 28 May 2018, Moravčík signed a two-year, entry-level contract with the Montreal Canadiens of the National Hockey League (NHL). After attending the Canadiens training camp, Moravčík was reassigned to add depth to American Hockey League affiliate, the Laval Rocket for the 2018–19 season. Struggling to adjust to the North American style, he appeared in 20 games with the Rocket recording 3 points, while also experiencing a shortened stint with secondary affiliate the Brampton Beast of the ECHL. Upon his second reassignment to the Beast, Moravčík was placed on unconditional waivers, opting for a termination of his NHL contract with the Canadiens on January 28, 2019.

As a free agent, Moravčík immediately rejoined his former club HC Plzeň for the remainder of the season, agreeing to an optional multi-year contract on January 30, 2019. He left Plzeň in the middle of the 2019–20 season, moving to HC Litvínov. Alongside countryman Jiří Smejkal, Moravčík joined Finnish side Tappara in May 2020.

Following a lone season with Tappara, Moravčík returned to the Czech Republic, signing an initial two-year contract with HC Sparta Praha of the ELH on 1 July 2021.

== Career statistics ==
=== Regular season and playoffs ===
			Regular season					Playoffs
Season	Team	League	GP	G	A	Pts	PIM	GP	G	A	Pts	PIM
2011–12	HC Plzeň	Czech20	7	0	0	0	2	—	—	—	—	—
2012–13	HC Plzeň	Czech20	38	2	5	7	18	2	0	0	0	0
2012–13	HC Plzeň	ELH	1	0	0	0	0	—	—	—	—	—
2013–14	HC Plzeň	Czech20	27	1	8	9	10	2	0	1	1	4
2013–14	HC Plzeň	ELH	12	0	1	1	2	5	0	0	0	2
2013–14	SHC Klatovy	Czech.2	6	2	1	3	10	2	0	2	2	4
2014–15	HC Plzeň	ELH	38	2	7	9	22	—	—	—	—	—
2014–15	HC Kladno	Czech.1	5	0	1	1	0	—	—	—	—	—
2015–16	HC Plzeň	ELH	42	2	5	7	24	5	0	1	1	0
2016–17	HC Plzeň	ELH	44	2	4	6	22	2	0	0	0	0
2016–17	SHC Klatovy	Czech.2	4	1	4	5	0	—	—	—	—	—
2017–18	HC Plzeň	ELH	52	5	11	16	28	10	3	4	7	6
2018–19	Laval Rocket	AHL	20	1	2	3	8	—	—	—	—	—
2018–19	Brampton Beast	ECHL	4	0	2	2	0	—	—	—	—	—
2018–19	HC Plzeň	ELH	13	2	6	8	6	14	0	1	1	14
2019–20	HC Plzeň	ELH	35	3	14	17	28	—	—	—	—	—
2019–20	HC Litvínov	ELH	13	2	5	7	10	—	—	—	—	—
2020–21	Tappara	Liiga	46	3	12	15	76	9	0	3	3	6
2021–22	HC Sparta Praha	ELH	43	7	19	26	29	16	1	4	5	2
2022–23	HC Sparta Praha	ELH	35	0	11	11	16	6	0	1	1	0
2023–24	HC Sparta Praha	ELH	47	3	6	9	28	9	2	1	3	0
ELH totals			375	28	89	117	215	67	6	12	18	24
Liiga totals			46	3	12	15	76	9	0	3	3	6

=== International ===
Year	Team	Event	Result	GP	G	A	Pts	PIM
2018	Czech Republic	WC	7th	8	1	2	3	2
2019	Czech Republic	WC	4th	8	0	2	2	8
2021	Czech Republic	WC	7th	3	0	3	3	0
Senior totals				19	1	7	8	10
