= 1938–39 Bohemian Championship season =

The 1938–39 Bohemian Championship season was the first and only season of the Bohemian Championship. Due to the outbreak of World War II, the Czechoslovak Extraliga was cancelled, and the championship was made up of teams from Central Bohemia. A separate championship was staged in Slovakia. Eight teams participated in the league, and LTC Prag won the championship.

== Regular season ==
| Pl. | Team | GP. | W | T | L | GF–GA | Pts. |
|---|---|---|---|---|---|---|---|
| 1. | LTC Prag | 7 | 7 | 0 | 0 | 61:1 | 14:0 |
| 2. | AC Sparta Prag | 7 | 4 | 2 | 1 | 41:6 | 10:4 |
| 3. | HOVS Prag | 6 | 4 | 1 | 1 | 33:14 | 9:3 |
| 4. | I. ČLTK Prag | 6 | 3 | 2 | 1 | 31:8 | 8:4 |
| 5. | SK Smíchov | 7 | 1 | 2 | 4 | 10:32 | 4:10 |
| 6. | SSC Říčany | 7 | 1 | 1 | 5 | 6:38 | 3:11 |
| 7. | CASK Prag | 7 | 1 | 1 | 5 | 12:48 | 3:11 |
| 8. | SK Zbraslav | 7 | 1 | 1 | 5 | 7:54 | 3:11 |
