= Jesse Virtanen =

Finnish ice hockey defenceman

- Born: 7 August 1991 (age 35) Rauma, Finland
- Height: 5 ft 11 in (180 cm)
- Weight: 185 lb (84 kg; 13 st 3 lb)
- Position: Defense
- Shoots: Left
- NL team Former teams: HC Ambrì-Piotta; Lukko; Traktor Chelyabinsk; Ak Bars Kazan; Färjestad BK
- Playing career: 2010–present

Jesse Virtanen (born 7 August 1991) is a Finnish professional ice hockey defenceman currently playing for HC Ambri-Piotta in the National League (NL).

== Playing career ==
Virtanen previously played the entirety of his youth and professional career with hometown club, Lukko of the Finnish Liiga. At the completion of the 2016–17 season, his 8th in the Liiga, Virtanen opted for a new challenge in agreeing to a one-year deal with Swedish club, Färjestad BK of the Swedish Hockey League, on 26 April 2017.

Virtanen played two seasons with Färjestad, establishing himself as one of the SHL's premier defenders, earning Defenseman of the Year honors after leading all blueliners in scoring with 35 assists and 41 points in 52 games in the 2018–19 season.

On 2 May 2019, Virtanen left Sweden as a free agent to sign a one-year contract with Russian outfit, Traktor Chelyabinsk of the KHL. In the 2019–20 season, Virtanen produced 5 goals and 16 points in 40 games with Traktor before he was traded to Ak Bars Kazan in exchange for Artem Mikheyev and Vyacheslav Osnovin on 23 December 2019.

Virtanen returned to Färjestad BK after a one-year break, with a one-year contract for the period 2020–2021.

== Awards and honours ==
Award	Year
SHL Defenseman of the Year	2019
Le Mat Trophy (Färjestad)	2022
Spengler Cup (Ambri-Piotta)	2022
