= Katherine Henderson (sports executive) =

Canadian sports executive

- Education: University of Western Ontario; Schulich School of Business; University of Toronto
- Occupation: Sports executive
- Known for: Hockey Canada; Curling Canada; Toronto Organizing Committee for the 2015 Pan and Parapan American Games

Katherine Henderson is a Canadian sports executive and businesswoman. She became president and CEO of Hockey Canada in September 2023, assuming control in the wake of the Hockey Canada sexual assault scandal, and is the first female president in the organization's history.

Henderson previously served as senior vice-president of marketing and revenue for the Toronto Organizing Committee for the 2015 Pan and Parapan American Games, and was the chief executive officer (CEO) of Curling Canada from 2016 to 2023. She led efforts to reverse the gender pay gap in sports for the Canadian men's and women's national curling teams, and received a diploma from the International Olympic Committee for her work in gender equality in sport.

== Early life and education ==
Henderson originates from Thunder Bay, Ontario. She learned how to skate at Carrick Park in Thunder Bay, but did not play hockey despite her father and brother doing so. She attended Brescia University College from 1981 to 1986. She earned a Bachelor of Science degree studying nutrition at University of Western Ontario, a Master of Business Administration degree from the Schulich School of Business, and a Master of Theological Studies degree from the University of Toronto.

In business, Henderson worked seven years for Whirlpool Corporation, in marketing and management for its Canadian and American divisions. She has also worked in Canadian marketing positions for Colgate-Palmolive, Campbell's, and General Mills.

== Sports career ==
Henderson served for 10 years on the board of directors for Rugby Canada. As of 2023, she is a co-chair of the Winter Caucus of Sport, which collaborates with Canadian Winter Olympic and Paralympic programs. The Hockey News cited Henderson in its list of 100 People of Power & Influence in 2024.

=== 2015 Pan and Parapan American Games ===
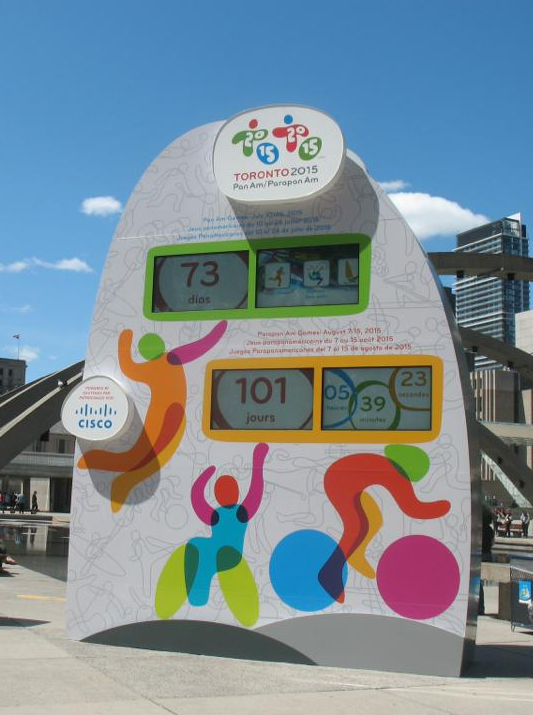
Countdown clock in Nathan Phillips Square

Henderson served as senior vice-president of marketing and revenue for the Toronto Organizing Committee for the 2015 Pan and Parapan American Games. She negotiated the broadcasting rights and oversaw the sponsorship program for the games, which broke records for attendance, ticket sales and television ratings. The Globe and Mail reported in 2016, that Henderson was among the 10 highest-paid public sector workers in the province, for her work with the games.

When SapientNitro was contracted to oversee social marketing on behalf of the games, Henderson stated that aims was to "focus on capturing the human element of the games". She also stated that Thunder Bay was chosen as the beginning of the Pan American Torch relay for the games, since "uniting the north and the south is a very symbolic thing of the way our games are".

=== Curling Canada ===
Henderson was named chief executive officer (CEO) of Curling Canada as of April 1, 2016. She sought to grow the game at the grassroots level, and expand marketing opportunities for championship events. During her tenure with Curling Canada, she led efforts to concentrate on increased participation, diversity, corporate support, and financial stability. She also led efforts to reverse the gender pay gap in sports for the Canadian men's and women's national curling teams. In 2022, she received a diploma from the International Olympic Committee for her work in gender equality in sport.

Henderson claimed that the COVID-19 pandemic in Canada tested Curling Canada's new governance structure, which included a newly-elected board of governors to focus on business strategy and risk management, while its member associations concentrated on the experience of participants and spectators. She felt that the change in governance combined with forward thinking allowed Curling Canada to succeed during the pandemic. According to Henderson, Curling Canada held bi-weekly video calls to discuss strategy during the pandemic, which included marketing, government lobbying, and a return-to-play policy. During the pandemic, she oversaw implementation of education on concussions in sport and the use of helmets; and a universal code of conduct for players and coaches.

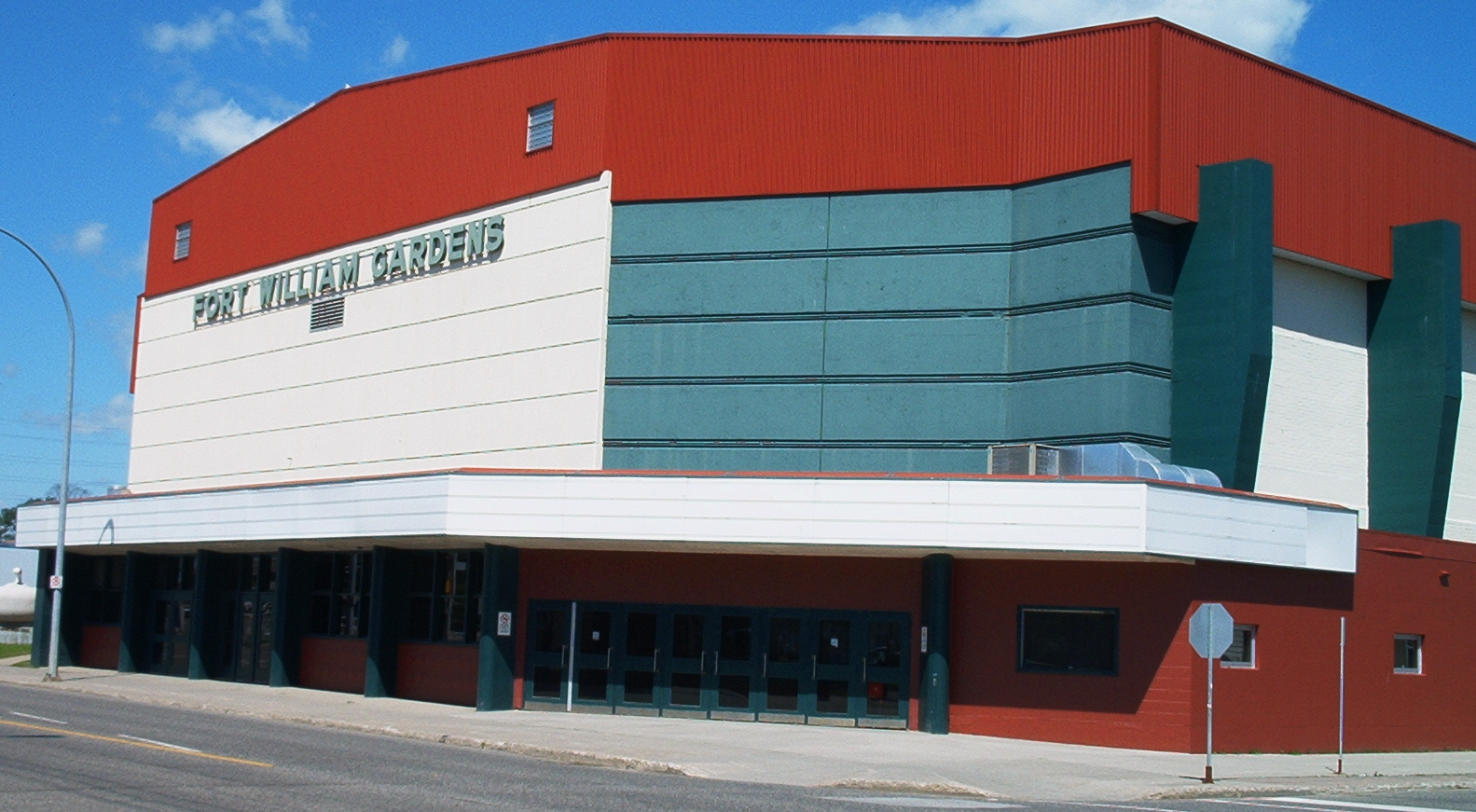
The Fort William Gardens hosted the 2022 Scotties Tournament of Hearts.

When Curling Canada awarded hosting duties of the 2021 Scotties Tournament of Hearts to Henderson's hometown of Thunder Bay, it was "a dream come true for her". Due to the COVID-19 pandemic, all events for the 2020–21 curling season were centralized at Canada Olympic Park in Calgary. Thunder Bay instead hosted the 2022 Scotties Tournament of Hearts.

Curling Canada cancelled multiple events due to the pandemic, including the Canadian Wheelchair Curling Championship and the Continental Cup. Henderson stated that Curling Canada would continue to evaluate its events "from the perspectives of fan enjoyment, value to stakeholders, including broadcasters, and value to Curling Canada's high-performance program".

In 2022, Henderson organized the "Changing the Face of Curling Symposium". The symposium aimed to promote diversity, equity and inclusion in international curling. In January 2023, Henderson announced that Curling Canada agreed to join Abuse-Free Sport, an independent program to prevent and address abuse in sport.

Henderson left her position with Curling Canada in August 2023.

=== Hockey Canada ===
In July 2023, Henderson was announced as the incoming president and CEO of Hockey Canada. Her hiring came after the departure of previous executive members due to the Hockey Canada sexual assault scandal, and the loss of corporate sponsors and government subsidies. After the announcement, Bauer Hockey reinstated its sponsorship of Hockey Canada. Henderson stated her desire to reverse the recent bad reputation from revelations about its toxic culture, and "to ensure that all Canadians have a personal hockey experience that is right for them". She began with Hockey Canada on September 4, 2023, based in Toronto, and became the first female president in the organization's history, succeeding Scott Smith.

Henderson's first national event was the "Beyond the Boards Summit", which discussed ways to make hockey a positive experience for participants; and changing current hockey culture which includes "elitism, gender-based violence, homophobia, misogyny, racism and sexism". The summit occurred within Henderson's first week with Hockey Canada. She reflected on the summit by stating, "It was very eye-opening to see how many people were willing to put their mistakes on the table, to be vulnerable about things that maybe they're not proud of in the past". Concerns raised at the summit included toxic masculinity in hockey, where younger men "were uncomfortable with what they were doing" in dressing rooms.

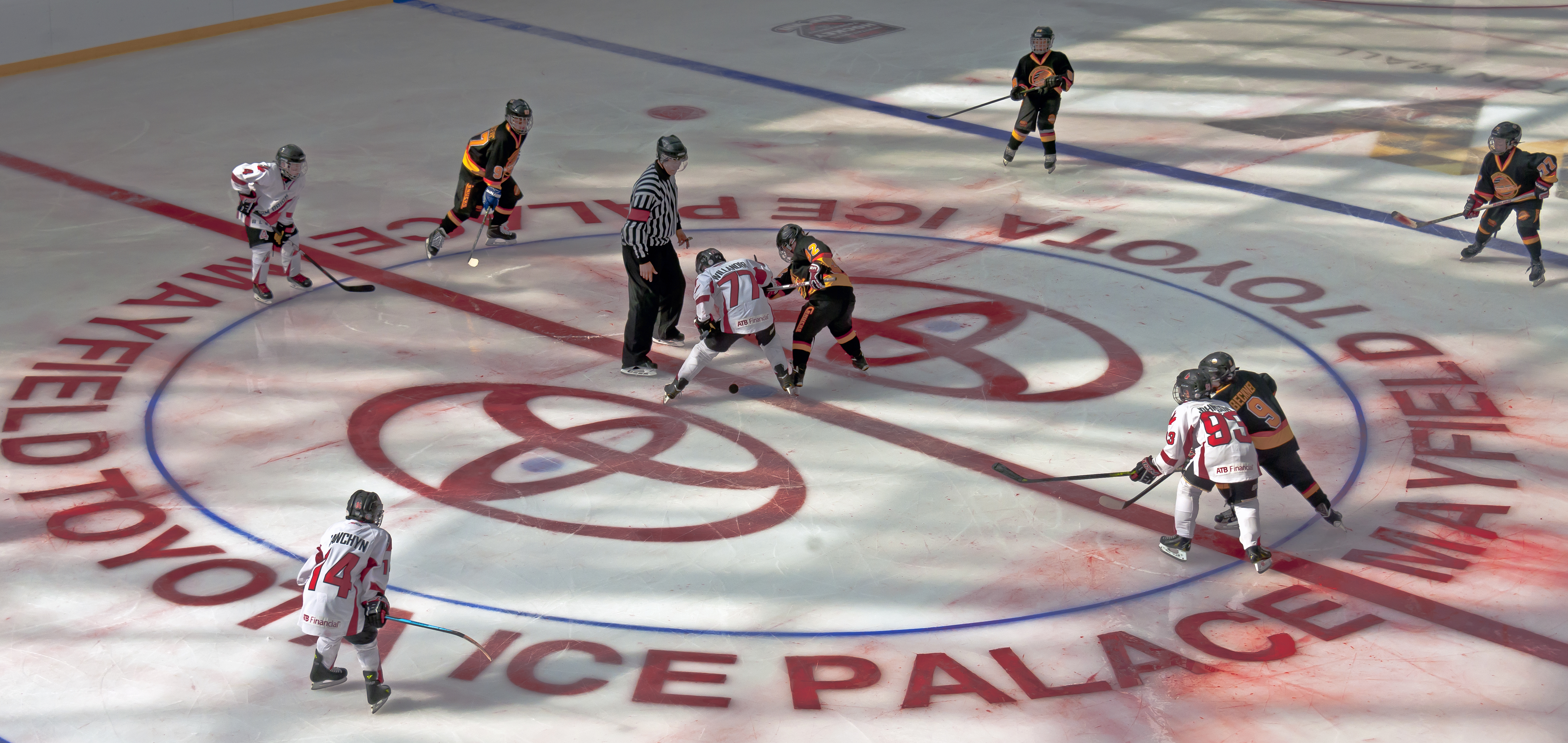
Example of minor ice hockey in Canada

Changes made by Hockey Canada since the summit included consent training for athletes and staff, and a "minimum attire rule" for dressing rooms in minor ice hockey to respect privacy and be inclusive of all minors. In future, Henderson wanted to female player registration which is 80 percent male as of 2023, and to get new immigrants to Canada involved in playing.

== Personal life ==
Henderson's husband died when their son was young. As a hockey mom, her son played for a Scarborough team in the Greater Toronto Hockey League. She is a recreational runner, and participates in a mixed curling league in Toronto.

Henderson is member of the board of trustees for Brescia University College as of 2023, and seeks to foster female leaders. She previously served on the board of directors for the Michael Garron Hospital.
