= Scott Smith (ice hockey) =

Canadian ice hockey executive (born 1966)

- Born: November 27, 1966 (age 59); Bathurst, New Brunswick, Canada
- Education: University of New Brunswick
- Occupation: Ice hockey executive
- Known for: Hockey Canada president and CEO

Scott Smith (born November 27, 1966) is a Canadian former ice hockey executive, who worked for Hockey Canada from 1995 until 2022. He served as vice-president and chief operating officer (COO) from 2007 to 2016, as president and COO from 2016 to 2022, and as president and chief executive officer in 2022. Smith oversaw growth business operations for Hockey Canada, managed International Ice Hockey Federation competitions, and negotiated public–private partnerships, and television deals. He resigned in October 2022, amid calls for leadership change due to the Hockey Canada sexual assault scandal.

== Early life ==
Smith was born November 27, 1966, in Bathurst, New Brunswick. He graduated from Bathurst High School in 1984. He completed an education degree at the University of New Brunswick in 1988. Smith was executive director from 1991 to 1995, of the New Brunswick Amateur Hockey Association. He served as an assistant coach for the UNB Varsity Reds during the 1994–95 season, and was an instructor for coaching and player development.

== Hockey Canada ==
=== Vice-president ===
Smith began working for Hockey Canada in 1995, as the manager of hockey operations for the Atlantic Canada centre of excellence in Saint John, New Brunswick. He relocated to the Calgary, Alberta office in 1997, becoming the director of operations, and in 1998 was promoted to vice-president of Hockey Canada business operations. The change coincided with the retirement of Murray Costello, and Bob Nicholson becoming president. In 2003, Smith was named by The Globe and Mail in its 40-under-40 list. Smith became the senior vice-president in charge of business operations in 2005, then senior executive vice-president in 2006, and chief operating officer (COO) in 2007. Smith was responsible for the day-to-day business of Hockey Canada under Nicholson.

Smith's management and marketing of international events was cited by the Stanford Graduate School of Business as a reason for the growth of Hockey Canada. His planning of programs has created profit margins, and increased television ratings. His work included organizing the IIHF World U20 Championships and the IIHF World Women's Championships hosted in Canada, negotiating a broadcasting agreement with The Sports Network and Réseau des sports, and Hockey Canada sponsorships and licensing. He also sat on the board of directors for the International Hockey Heritage Centre, the International Ice Hockey Federation Marketing Committee, and the IIHF 100th Anniversary Committee.

Smith sought public–private partnerships for Hockey Canada with mutual value, sustainable relationships with similar goals, and realistic goals that Hockey Canada can deliver to partners, to get more funding and sponsorships in the future, instead of relying on donations and government subsidy. Smith said that government subsidy is five to seven per cent of the total Hockey Canada budget, distributed to coaching and officiating development, the national teams for Olympic participation, some is from Sport Canada. Smith negotiated with Canadian Tire, and Bauer Hockey in 2014, to create the First Shift Program. The program includes equipment for new players to the game, and a six-week program to learn the game. As of 2018, First Shift helped 15,500 Canadian children play hockey, and made its debut in Inuvik, Northwest Territories.

Smith negotiated Hockey Canada's relationship with Molson Brewery such that it is different at adult events, and youth events below the legal drinking age, and ensured there are guidelines for usage of the Hockey Canada brand. He has also negotiated deals to perpetuate Hockey Canada Foundation philanthropy, seeking corporate sponsors with an interest in youth hockey, and to run events with hockey alumni, and involve community leaders, such as a partnership with the city of Montreal and the Montreal Canadiens, to provide hockey for underprivileged youth. Smith pursued an ethical consumerism policy for Hockey Canada and its merchandise suppliers. Smith said that Hockey Canada wants "to keep up to the highest standards of transparency", and work with labour rights groups, including the Worker Rights Consortium and the Worldwide Responsible Accredited Production."

Smith spoke at the World Hockey Summit in 2010, and expressed concerns that youth hockey was no longer growing in Canada. He stated that 9.1% of Canadian children from ages 9 to 15 were playing ice hockey, a figure which had changed in the last decade. He felt that the increasing cost of playing, and increasing cultural diversity which embraced other sporting options and contributing factors; and it would be necessary for minor hockey associations to promote the game and make it easier to participate.

=== President ===
Prior to becoming COO of Hockey Canada, Smith was not well known outside of hockey, and seemed to be an internal replacement for Nicholson when the latter retired in July 2014. Smith was considered for the presidency when Tom Renney was hired instead. On December 29, 2016, Hockey Canada announced that Smith would replace Renney as president on July 1, 2017. Smith kept his role as COO, while Renney remained as CEO. Renney said that by promoting Smith, "there was an opportunity for Hockey Canada to be more effective in fulfilling its mandate", and that he and Smith have “very complementary skill sets and approaches”. Renney said that their respective "jobs really won’t change a whole lot, other than that we make ourselves more diverse". The change created a higher public profile for Smith, while he continued to oversee regular business operations.

Smith said that one his first objectives after becoming president was to "deepen the quality of the hockey experience" and to attract more players and coaches into the game. He also believed that Hockey Canada's existing coaching, officiating, and respect in sport programs are top notch. He noted that as of 2016, Hockey Canada had approximately 675,000 registered players, and he wanted to increase that and give more players an opportunity to be at the World Juniors. He implemented new analytical measures at Hockey Canada to track new players to the game, and retention rate of them. He also began a floorball program, and distributing children's literature to reach out to newer Canadians and ethnic communities, in attempt to have hockey teams reflect the multiculturalism in Canada.

Smith became president of Hockey Canada at the same time which the organization was criticized about the ticket prices and the lack of attendance at the 2015 World Junior Ice Hockey Championships, and the 2017 World Junior Ice Hockey Championships, co-hosted in Toronto and Montreal. At the previous events Canada hosted, the total attendance in Calgary and Edmonton was 455,342 fans, Ottawa drew 453,282 fans, but attendance dropped to 366,370 fans in Canada’s largest cities. Smith said that the Toronto market was saturated by other events such as the 2016 World Cup of Hockey, the NHL Centennial Classic, the 104th Grey Cup, the MLS Cup 2016, the 2016 NBA All-Star Game, and the playoff success of the Toronto Raptors, and the Toronto Blue Jays. Ticket sales in Montreal struggled, despite prices being lowered by 30% in 2017 compared to 2015, and a marketing change to sell more individual games, and fewer package deals. Despite the poor attendance, Hockey Canada achieved 80% of its goal of $21 million in ticket sales, to reinvest into the community and the participating teams.

Later in 2017, Smith announced a new deal with BDO Global in Canada, to begin the Goals for Kids program, and expand its partnership of events such as the World U-17 Hockey Challenge, the World Junior A Challenge, the World Sledge Hockey Challenge, the National Women's Under-18 Championship, the Esso Cup, the Telus Cup, and the RBC Cup. The deal included a set donation per goal scored by teams at those events, which is reinvested in the host communities as a legacy program. Smith was optimistic that National Hockey League players would participate in ice hockey at the 2018 Winter Olympics, but was prepared for alternative measures. He and Renney collaborated regularly with team management of Sean Burke with the men's national team, and Melody Davidson with the women's national team to ensure that staff and athletes were prepared to perform on the ice. In 2018, Smith extended the partnership with Bauer Hockey for another eight years, who have been the official equipment supplier for the national teams since 1996.

On July 1, 2022, Smith succeeded Renney as chief executive officer of Hockey Canada while retaining the position of president.

In July 2022, Smith testified at a probe by the Department of Canadian Heritage committee into Hockey Canada's handling of sexual assault allegations in 2018, and whether to remove the freeze on funding by the government to Hockey Canada. Smith stated that Hockey Canada paid CA$8,900,000 to settle 21 cases of alleged sexual assault since 1989, including the use of a fund supplied by player registration fees. He dismissed calls by the committee for him to resign, and wished to resolve the issue. He also released a 19-page document which outlined an action plan to address the concerns of the Hockey Canada sexual assault scandal, and to change the culture within hockey.

Amid calls for leadership change due to the scandal, the board of directors and Smith resigned from Hockey Canada on October 11, 2022. Nine months later, his replacement was announced as Katherine Henderson, the first female president of Hockey Canada.

== Personal life ==
As of 2018, Smith resides in Calgary with his wife, Karen. He has one son, who grew up playing hockey. Smith has family in the Bathurst area, and a summer cottage on Chaleur Bay. He considers himself fortunate to have a career in hockey, and is grateful for its experiences, highlighted by the gold medals won by the men's and women's ice hockey teams at the Winter Olympic Games from 2002 to 2014.
