= 1942–43 Bohemian-Moravian Hockey League season =

Fourth season of the Bohemian-Moravian Hockey League

The 1942-43 Bohemian-Moravian Hockey League season was the fourth season of the Bohemian-Moravian Hockey League. Six teams participated in the league, and LTC Prag won the championship.

== Regular season ==
Pl.	Team	GP	W	T	L	GF–GA	Pts.
1.	LTC Prag	5	4	1	0	21-2	9
2.	I. ČLTK Prag	5	3	2	0	20-4	8
3.	AC Sparta Prag	5	2	1	2	11-8	5
4.	SK Podolí Prag	5	1	2	2	8-15	4
5.	AC Stadion České Budějovice	5	1	1	3	7-19	3
6.	ČSK Vítkovice	5	0	1	4	2-21	1

== Promotion ==
Semifinals:

- AFK Kolín – Královo Pole 1:1 OT
- SK Libeň – Stadion Prag 2:1

Final:

- SK Libeň – AFK Kolín 5:2

SK Liben was promoted to the Bohemian-Moravian League for 1943–44.
