= Jakub Konečný =

Czech ice hockey player

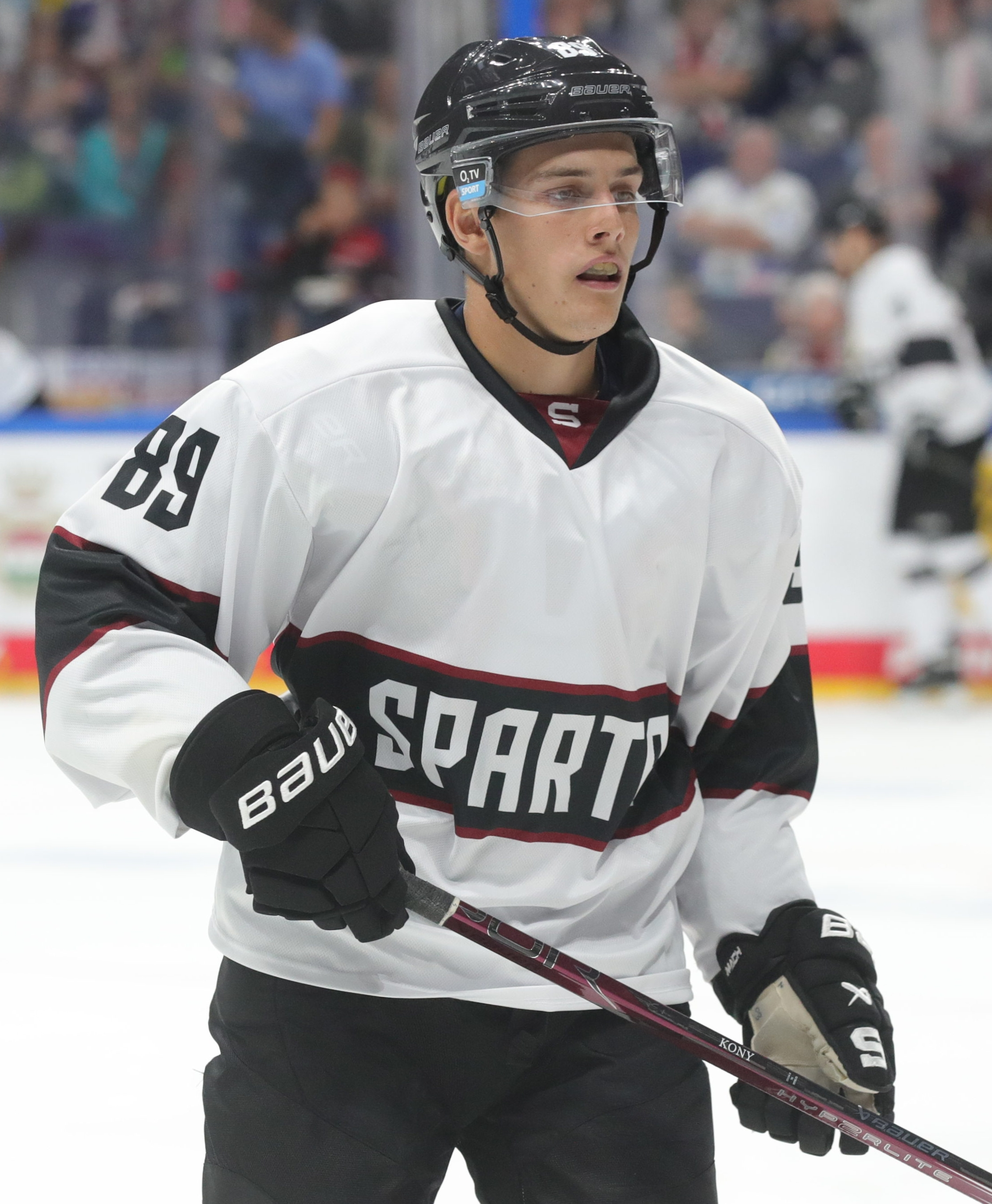
- Konečný in 2023
- Born: 19 June 2002 (age 24) Brno, Czech Republic
- Height: 5 ft 10 in (178 cm)
- Weight: 150 lb (68 kg; 10 st 10 lb)
- Position: Centre
- Shoots: Left
- ELH team: HC Kometa Brno
- NHL draft: 216th overall, 2020; Buffalo Sabres
- Playing career: 2021–present

Jakub Konečný (born 19 June 2002) is a Czech professional ice hockey centre for HC Kometa Brno of the Czech Extraliga.

== Playing career ==
Konečný made his professional debut for HC Sparta Praha during the 2021–22 season. He was drafted in the seventh round, 216th overall, by the Buffalo Sabres in the 2020 NHL entry draft. On May 1st 2024 he was transferred to HC Kometa Brno from Sparta

== International play ==
Konečný played for the Czech Republic at the 2022 World Junior Ice Hockey Championships.

== Career statistics ==
			Regular season					Playoffs
Season	Team	League	GP	G	A	Pts	PIM	GP	G	A	Pts	PIM
2020–21	HC Baník Sokolov	Czech 2.liga	4	1	2	3	0	—	—	—	—	—
2020–21	HC Stadion Litoměřice	Czech 2.liga	19	2	8	10	0	12	1	3	4	0
2021–22	HC Stadion Litoměřice	Czech 2.liga	5	0	0	0	0	—	—	—	—	—
2021–22	HC Sparta Praha	Czech Extraliga	28	4	3	7	0	—	—	—	—	—
2021-22	HC Baník Sokolov	Czech 2.liga	5	0	3	3	0	9	3	1	4	2
2022-23	HC Baník Sokolov	Czech 2.liga	5	1	2	3	0	—	—	—	—	—
2022–23	HC Sparta Praha	Czech Extraliga	45	5	6	11	6	2	0	0	0	25
2023-24	HC Sparta Praha	Czech Extraliga	48	5	7	12	12	10	0	0	0	2
Czech 2.liga totals			38	4	15	19	0	21	4	4	8	2
Czech Extraliga totals			121	14	16	30	18	12	0	0	0	27
