= Bohemian-Moravian Hockey League =

The Bohemian-Moravian Hockey League (Czech: Českomoravská liga) was the top level of ice hockey in the Protectorate of Bohemia and Moravia in 1939–1944. It was known as the Mistrovství Čech a Moravy in 1939–1940 and the Národní liga in 1941–1944.

== Champions ==
- 1939-40 – ČLTK Praha
- 1940-41 – LTC Praha
- 1941-42 – LTC Praha
- 1942-43 – LTC Praha
- 1943-44 – LTC Praha
