= Tom Renney =

Canadian ice hockey coach and executive (born 1955)

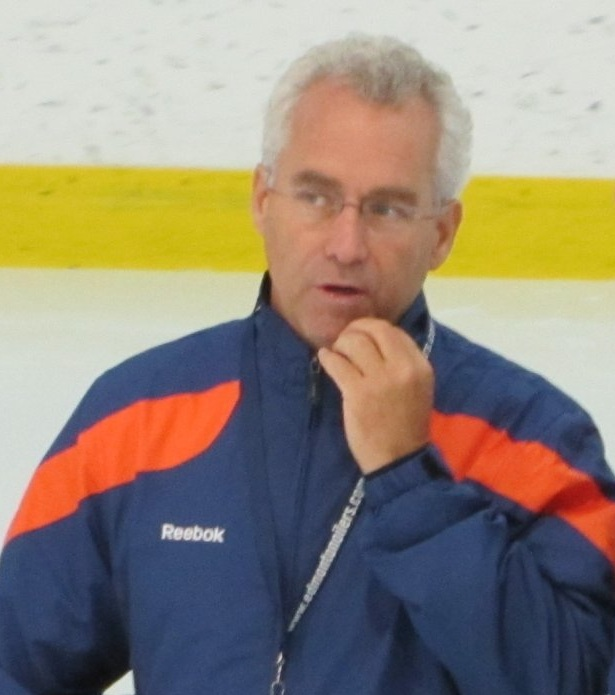
- Renney in 2011
- Born: March 1, 1955 (age 71) Cranbrook, British Columbia, Canada
- Coached for: Vancouver Canucks; New York Rangers; Edmonton Oilers; Detroit Red Wings
- Coaching career: 1996–2014

Thomas Renney (born March 1, 1955) is a Canadian former ice hockey coach and executive. He served as the chief executive officer of Hockey Canada from 2014 to 2022, and was previously an associate coach with the National Hockey League (NHL)'s Detroit Red Wings and also served as head coach of the Vancouver Canucks, New York Rangers, and Edmonton Oilers.

Renney began his coaching career in the Western Hockey League (WHL), capturing a Memorial Cup in his two-year stint with the Kamloops Blazers. In addition to the Rangers, he has also previously coached the Vancouver Canucks for two seasons. He has participated in the coaching staff for Canada's national teams on numerous occasions, capturing a silver medal as the head coach at the 1994 Winter Olympics.

== Coaching career ==
=== Kamloops Blazers ===
Renney began his career behind the bench in the major junior ranks with the Kamloops Blazers of the Western Hockey League (WHL) in 1990–91. He immediately established success at the junior level, leading the club to consecutive President's Cup championships as WHL champions and a Memorial Cup as Canadian Hockey League (CHL) champions. In his two seasons with the Blazers, Renney compiled a 101-37-6 record for a .714 winning percentage, which ranks as the all-time highest winning mark in CHL history.

=== Vancouver Canucks ===
Renney earned his first National Hockey League (NHL) coaching stint in 1996–97 with the Vancouver Canucks. He replaced Pat Quinn, who had himself taken over coaching duties from Rick Ley for the final six games of the previous season before returning to his general manager duties. He finished with a 35-40-7 record in his only full season with the Canucks, before being fired 19 games into the 1997–98 season. He was replaced by Mike Keenan.

=== New York Rangers ===
Renney began his tenure in the New York Rangers organization as Director of Player Personnel, where he oversaw all facets of the team's amateur scouting operation, while assisting with the professional scouting department. He was promoted to Vice President of Player Development on June 21, 2002. He was instrumental in establishing an off-season conditioning and skills camp for several Rangers prospects in Calgary, Alberta, and then in New York City at the Madison Square Garden Training Center.

Renney was appointed the Rangers' head coach with twenty games left in the 2003–04 regular season, succeeding Glen Sather who wanted to concentrate on his general manager duties. He led the team into the postseason in each of the three campaigns after the 2004–05 NHL lockout. The farthest the Rangers advanced in the playoffs was the Eastern Conference Semifinals (2nd round) in 2007 and 2008.

In 2009, Renney was the subject of an Internet parody, The Ranger Line Generator, that focused on the coaches' strategic shuffling of player line combinations. The website allowed users to create random line combinations based on the 2008–09 Ranger roster. The Line Generator also points out Renney's perceived misuse of Petr Průcha.

With the underachieving Rangers stuck in a 2–7–3 slump and in danger of missing the postseason for the first time since prior to the lockout, Renney was fired from his duties on February 23, 2009, and replaced by TSN analyst and former Tampa Bay Lightning head coach John Tortorella, who served as the interim head coach for the last 4 games of the 1999-2000 season. The club also dismissed assistant coach Perry Pearn, but retained fellow assistant coach Mike Pelino and goaltending coach Benoit Allaire. The move came immediately after the Rangers dropped a 3-2 overtime decision to the Toronto Maple Leafs at Madison Square Garden on February 22 (Howell-Bathgate Night). Renney left the Rangers fourth overall on the club's all-time wins list for head coaches with 164.

=== Edmonton Oilers ===
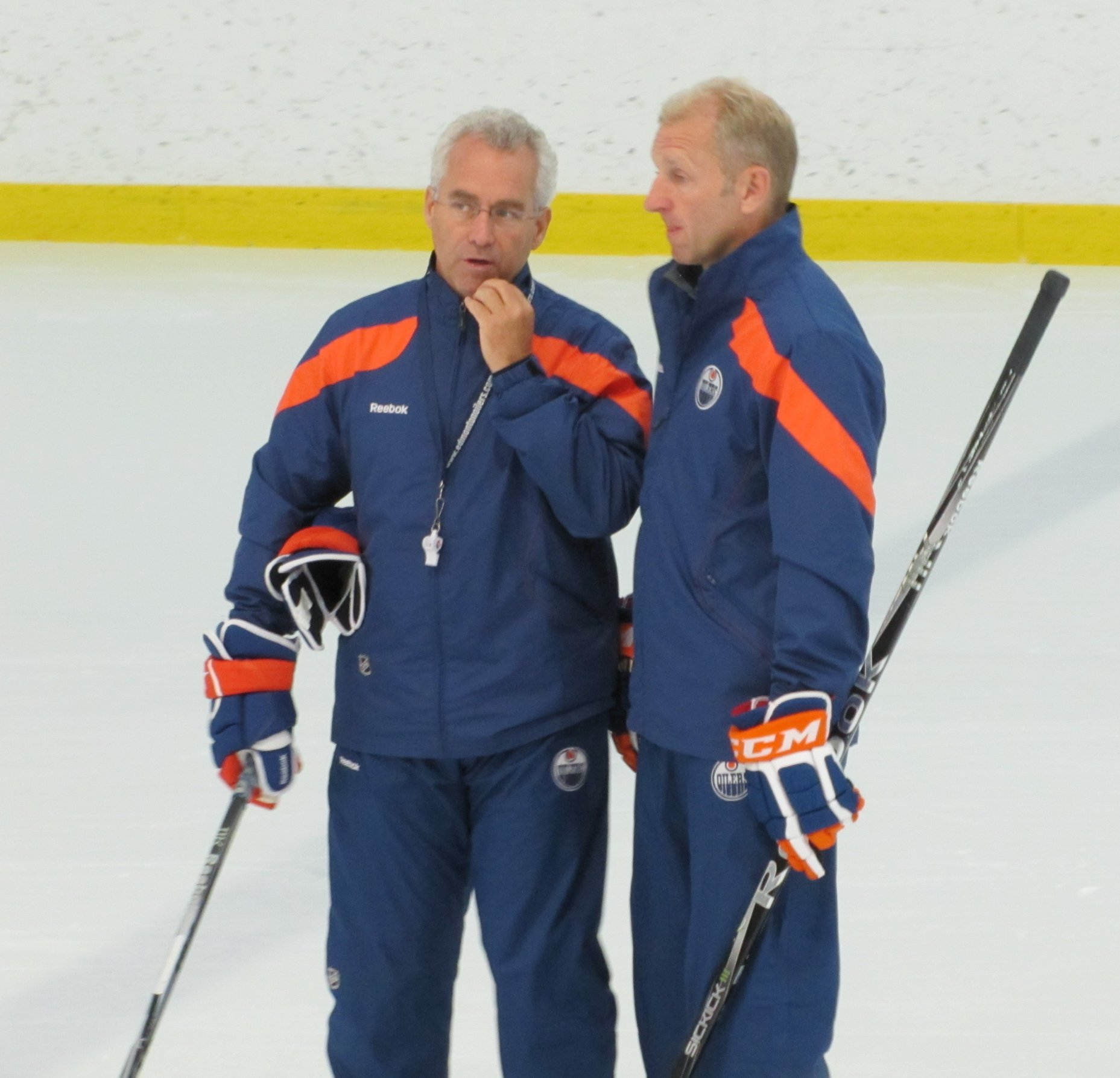
Tom Renney with associate coach Ralph Krueger at the 2011 Edmonton Oilers training camp.

Renney was named associate coach of the Edmonton Oilers on May 26, 2009, and was named head coach of the Oilers on June 22, 2010, once again replacing Pat Quinn. On May 17, 2012, the Edmonton Oilers Management announced that his contract would not be renewed for the 2012–2013 season.

=== Detroit Red Wings ===
Renney was named associate coach of the Detroit Red Wings on July 5, 2012 under Mike Babcock.

=== International career ===
Renney served as head coach of the Canada men's national team that won a silver medal at the 1994 Winter Olympics. He was an assistant coach of the national team that won a gold medal at the 1994 World Championships. As head coach of the national team, he won bronze at the 1995 World Championships, and silver at the 1996 World Championships. At the 1999 World Junior Ice Hockey Championships, he won a silver medal as head coach of the Canada men's national junior team. He later served as an assistant coach for the Canada men's national team which won silver medals at the 2004 IIHF World Championship, and the 2005 IIHF World Championship.

Renney served as chairman of the International Ice Hockey Federation coaching committee from 2015 to 2022.

== Hockey Canada executive ==
Renney served as vice-president of hockey operations for Hockey Canada from 1998 to 2000, then became president and chief executive officer (CEO) in July 2014. In July 2017, he appointed Scott Smith as president and remained as CEO. Renney retired as CEO on July 1, 2022, and was succeeded by Scott Smith.

During his tenure as CEO, Renney helped guide the Canada men's national team, Canada women's national team, and national para team to 28 medals in international competition, including nine gold, fifteen silver and four bronze medals.

== Personal life ==
Renney attended the University of North Dakota and received a degree in physical education. He married Glenda Gare, the sister of former NHL player Danny Gare. They first met when Tom owned a clothing store in Trail, British Columbia. Renney and his wife have two daughters. His other brother-in-law, Morey Gare, was the Edmonton Oilers head pro scout until 2015.

== Coaching record ==
Team	Year	Regular season							Post season			
Team	Year	G	Win	Lose	Tie	OTL	Pts	Finish	Win	Lose	Win %	Result
VAN	1996–97	82	35	40	7	-	77	4th in Pacific	—	—	—	Missed playoffs
VAN	1997–98	19	4	13	2	-	(64)	Fired	—	—	—	—
NYR	2003–04	20	5	11	0	4	(69)	4th in Atlantic	—	—	—	Missed playoffs
NYR	2005–06	82	44	26	-	12	100	3rd in Atlantic	0	4	.000	Lost East quarter-finals
NYR	2006–07	82	42	30	-	10	94	3rd in Atlantic	6	4	.600	Lost East semi-finals
NYR	2007–08	82	42	27	-	13	97	3rd in Atlantic	5	6	.500	Lost East semi-finals
NYR	2008–09	61	31	23	-	7	(95)	Fired	-	-	-	-
EDM	2010-11	82	25	45	-	12	62	5th in Northwest	-	-	-	Missed playoffs
EDM	2011-12	82	32	40	-	10	74	5th in Northwest	-	-	-	Missed playoffs
Total		592	260	255	9	68	597	--	11	13	.458	3 playoff appearances

Preceded by Pat Quinn	Head coach of the Vancouver Canucks; 1996–97	Succeeded by Mike Keenan
Preceded by Glen Sather	Head coach of the New York Rangers; 2004–09	Succeeded by John Tortorella
Preceded by Pat Quinn	Head coach of the Edmonton Oilers; 2010–12	Succeeded by Ralph Krueger
