= Michael Brind'Amour =

Chair of Hockey Canada 2018 to 2022

- Occupation: Lawyer
- Known for: Chairing Hockey Canada (2018-2022)

Michael Brind'Amour is a Canadian retired lawyer who was the chair of Hockey Canada from November 2018 until his resignation in August 2022. He resigned during the Hockey Canada sexual assault scandal.

== Career ==
Brind'Amour is a Saint-Alphonse-Rodriguez, Quebec-based retired lawyer. His forty-year legal career included working in civil, family youth protection, criminal, and administrative social law.

Brind'Amour was elected as the chair of the board of directors of Hockey Canada in November 2018, and re-elected for a second two-year term in 2022. He resigned from the role on August 5, 2022, during the Hockey Canada sexual assault scandal. He appeared before a parliamentary hearing on October 4, 2022 along with Andrea Skinner, who succeeded him as the board chair, to answer questions about the scandal. At the hearing, Brind'Amour was criticised for a lack of transparency, allegations that he rejected.

Prior to his chairing of Hockey Canada, Brind'Amour was the chair of Hockey Québec.
