= Eddie Larsson =

Swedish ice hockey player

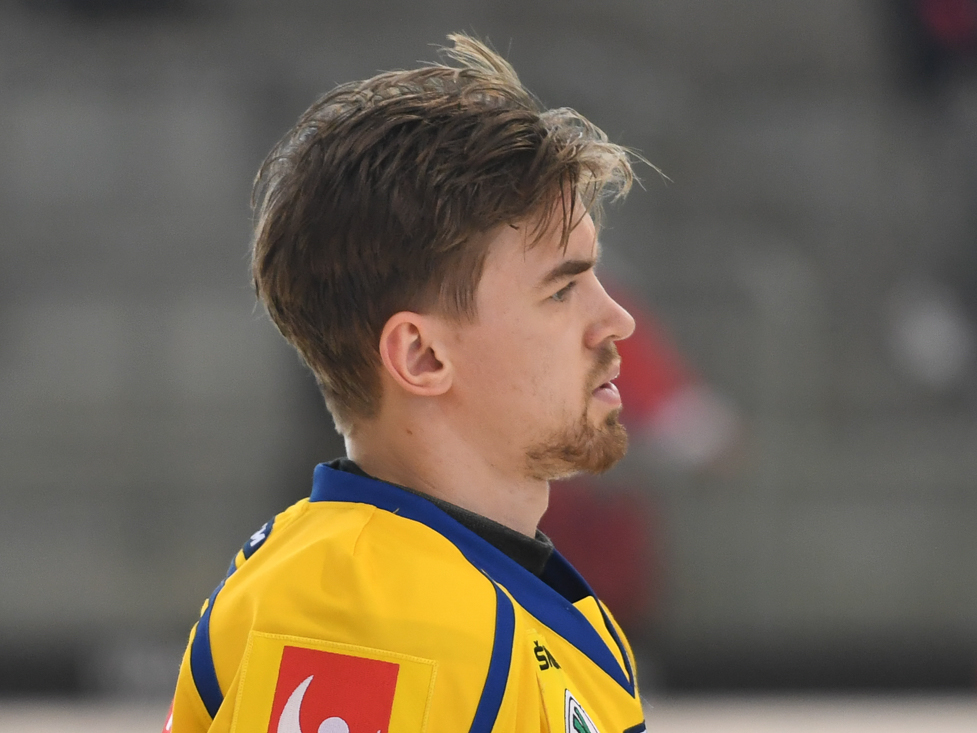
- Born: February 15, 1991 (age 34) Mariestad, Sweden
- Height: 6 ft 2 in (188 cm)
- Weight: 198 lb (90 kg; 14 st 2 lb)
- Position: Defence
- Shoots: Left
- SHL team Former teams: Free agent Modo Hockey; Växjö Lakers; Linköping HC; Luleå HF; HIFK; Leksands IF
- Playing career: 2009–present

Eddie Larsson (born February 15, 1991) is a Swedish professional ice hockey defenceman who is currently an unrestricted free agent. He most recently played with Leksands IF of the Swedish Hockey League (SHL).

Larsson has previously played for Modo Hockey, Växjö Lakers, Linköping HC and Luleå HF, while also appearing for BIK Karlskoga of the HockeyAllsvenskan.

== Career statistics ==
			Regular season					Playoffs
Season	Team	League	GP	G	A	Pts	PIM	GP	G	A	Pts	PIM
2006–07	Mariestad BoIS HC J18	J18 Div.1	—	—	—	—	—	—	—	—	—	—
2006–07	Mariestad BoIS HC J20	J20 Elit	—	—	—	—	—	—	—	—	—	—
2007–08	Linköping HC J18	J18 Elit	20	1	8	9	14	—	—	—	—	—
2007–08	Linköping HC J20	J20 SuperElit	12	0	0	0	4	5	0	0	0	0
2008–09	Linköping HC J18	J18 Elit	6	0	0	0	8	—	—	—	—	—
2008–09	Linköping HC J18	J18 Allsvenskan	2	0	1	1	0	1	0	1	1	2
2008–09	Linköping HC J20	J20 SuperElit	38	2	5	7	36	5	0	1	1	6
2009–10	MODO Hockey J20	J20 SuperElit	37	9	18	27	62	3	0	2	2	2
2009–10	MODO Hockey	Elitserien	19	1	0	1	2	—	—	—	—	—
2009–10	IF Sundsvall Hockey	HockeyAllsvenskan	5	0	0	0	2	—	—	—	—	—
2010–11	MODO Hockey J20	J20 SuperElit	20	1	11	12	24	6	1	4	5	14
2010–11	MODO Hockey	Elitserien	6	0	0	0	2	—	—	—	—	—
2010–11	VIK Västerås HK	HockeyAllsvenskan	3	0	0	0	0	—	—	—	—	—
2010–11	IF Sundsvall Hockey	HockeyAllsvenskan	29	1	4	5	12	—	—	—	—	—
2011–12	Bofors IK J20	J20 Elit	2	0	5	5	0	—	—	—	—	—
2011–12	Bofors IK	HockeyAllsvenskan	14	0	2	2	6	7	0	0	0	2
2012–13	BIK Karlskoga	HockeyAllsvenskan	44	2	8	10	20	4	0	0	0	4
2013–14	Växjö Lakers HC	SHL	42	1	5	6	8	10	0	0	0	6
2014–15	Växjö Lakers HC	SHL	39	1	2	3	16	18	0	1	1	2
2014–15	BIK Karlskoga	HockeyAllsvenskan	2	0	0	0	2	—	—	—	—	—
2015–16	Växjö Lakers HC	SHL	46	0	5	5	14	11	1	0	1	4
2016–17	Linköping HC	SHL	50	2	12	14	24	6	0	2	2	8
2017–18	Linköping HC	SHL	50	1	10	11	30	7	0	2	2	14
2018–19	Linköping HC	SHL	43	2	11	13	32	—	—	—	—	—
2019–20	Linköping HC	SHL	52	1	7	8	30	—	—	—	—	—
2020–21	Luleå HF	SHL	45	0	8	8	22	7	0	1	1	31
2021–22	Linköping HC	SHL	50	1	7	8	30	—	—	—	—	—
2022–23	HIFK	Liiga	50	1	7	8	20	11	0	1	1	10
2023–24	Leksands IF	SHL	51	2	6	8	16	7	0	1	1	2
2024–25	Leksands IF	SHL	43	1	8	9	26	—	—	—	—	—
SHL (Elitserien) totals			536	13	81	94	252	66	1	7	8	67
Liiga totals			50	1	7	8	20	11	0	1	1	10
HockeyAllsvenskan totals			97	3	14	17	42	11	0	0	0	6
