= Brind (surname) =

Brind is a surname. Notable people with the surname include:

- Alan Brind, British violinist
- Bridget Brind, British diplomat
- Bryony Brind (1960–2015), British ballerina
- Joel Brind, American biologist and endocrinologist
- John Brind (1878–1954), British Army officer
- Patrick Brind (1892–1963), British Royal Navy officer
- Richard Brind (died 1718), English organist
- Stephanie Brind (born 1977), English squash player
- William Darby Brind (1794–1850), New Zealand mariner

== See also ==
- Brind, hamlet in England
