= HC Sparta Praha =

Ice hockey team

- City: Prague, Czech Republic
- League: Czech Extraliga
- Founded: 6 December 1903
- Home arena: O2 Arena
- Colours: Red, yellow, blue
- Owner: Kaprain Group
- General manager: Petr Vosmík
- Head coach: Patrik Augusta
- Captain: Filip Chlapík
- Website: www.hcsparta.cz

Franchise history
- 1903–1948: AC Sparta Praha
- 1948–1949: Sokol Sparta Bubeneč
- 1949–1951: ZSJ Bratrství Sparta Praha
- 1951–1953: ZSJ Sparta ČKD Sokolovo Praha
- 1953–1965: TJ Spartak Praha Sokolovo
- 1965–1990: TJ Sparta ČKD Praha
- 1990–present: HC Sparta Praha

Hockey Club Sparta Praha, commonly known as HC Sparta Prague, is a Prague-based Czech professional ice hockey team playing in the Czech Extraliga. The club has won four Czech championships (most recently in 2007) and four Czechoslovak championships, as well as two Spengler Cups, making it one of the most successful hockey clubs in Czech history. The team HC Sparta Praha plays its home games at O2 Arena, the largest arena in the country.

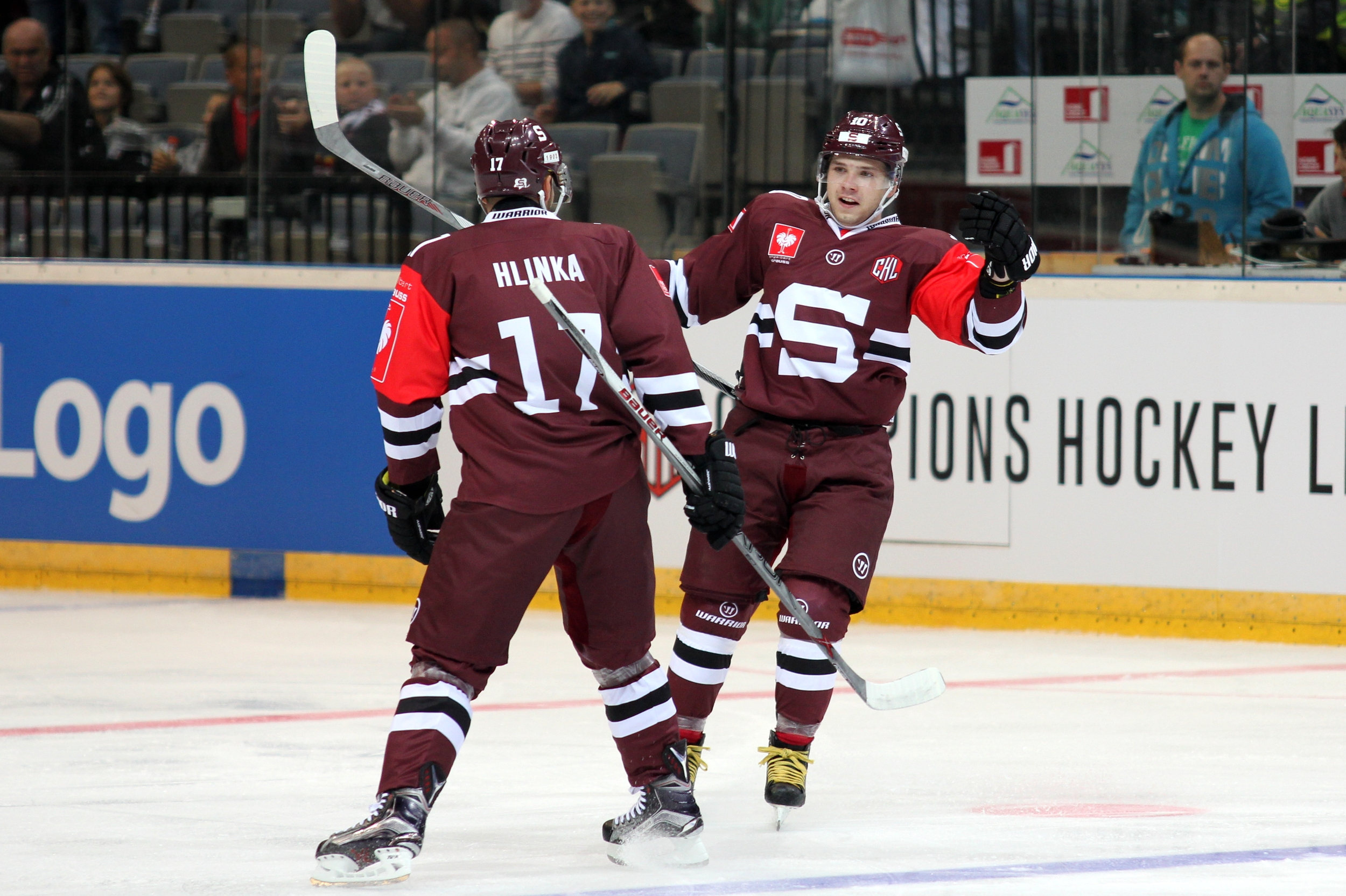
Players in HC Sparta Praha jerseys

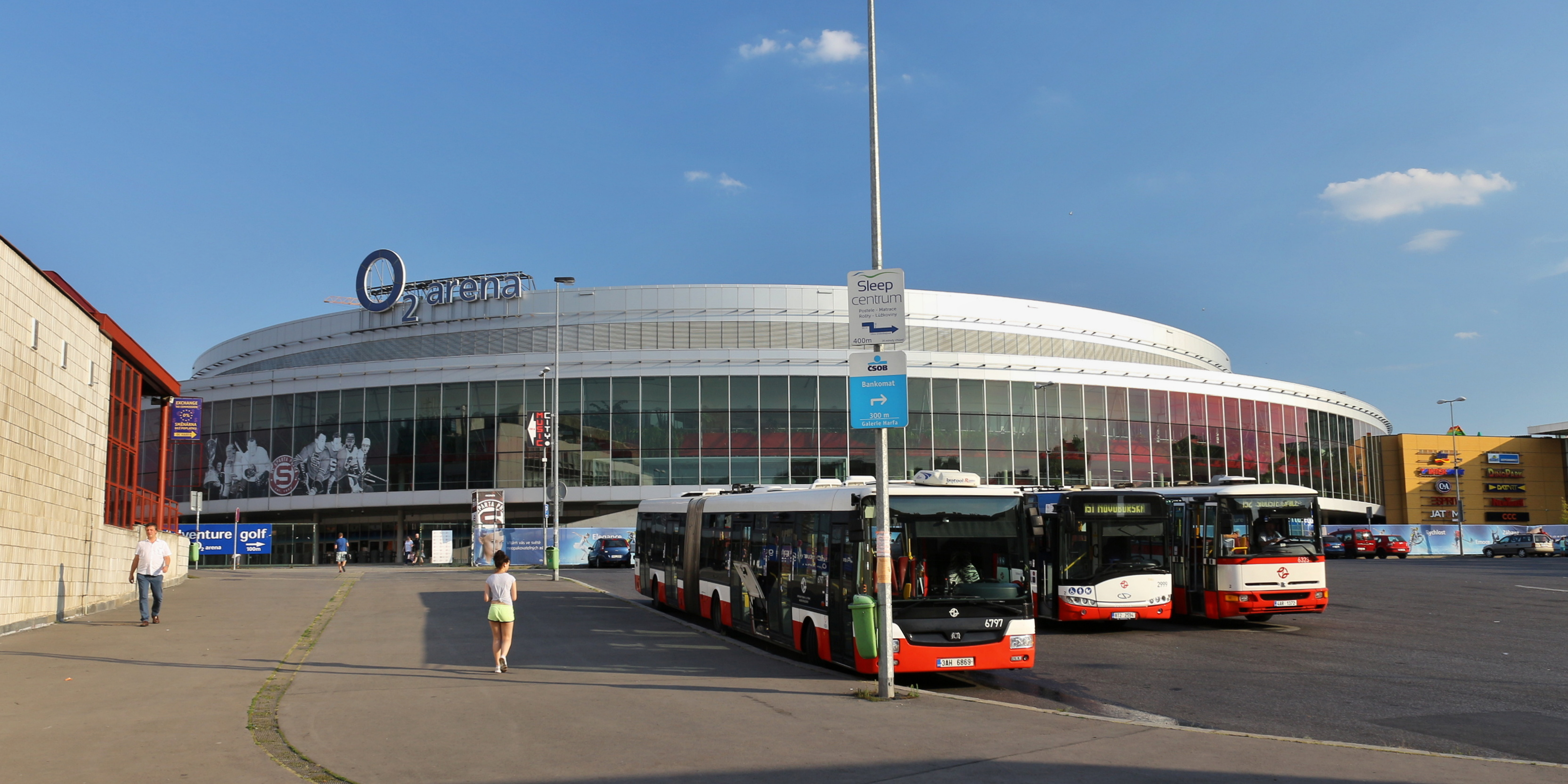
Since 2015, the home stadium of the team is O2 Arena

Founded in 1903, Sparta is one of the oldest hockey teams in the world.

== Milestones ==
- Founded: The club was originally formed in 1903 as a bandy club and then transformed into a hockey club in 1909.
- Best finishes: National champions of Czechoslovakia: 1952–53, 1953–54, 1989–90, 1992–93. National champions of the Czech Republic: 1999–00, 2001–02, 2005–06, 2006–07
- Worst finishes: Czechoslovakia: 8th place (1972–73, 1980–81, 1982–83, 1985–86), Czech Republic: 12th place (2010–11).

Highest national league participation: From the league foundation in 1936 to 1950 and from 1951 up to this day.

- International achievements: Spengler Cup winner in 1962, 1963, Spengler Cup 2nd place in 2004 and 2022, European League 2nd place 2000, European Champions Cup 2nd place in 2008, Champions Hockey League 2nd place 2017.
- Club colours: Blue, yellow and red. Starting in the 2001–02 season, club jerseys used a combination of black, white and grey. Since the 2005–06 season, jerseys have regularly been burgundy and white.

== History ==
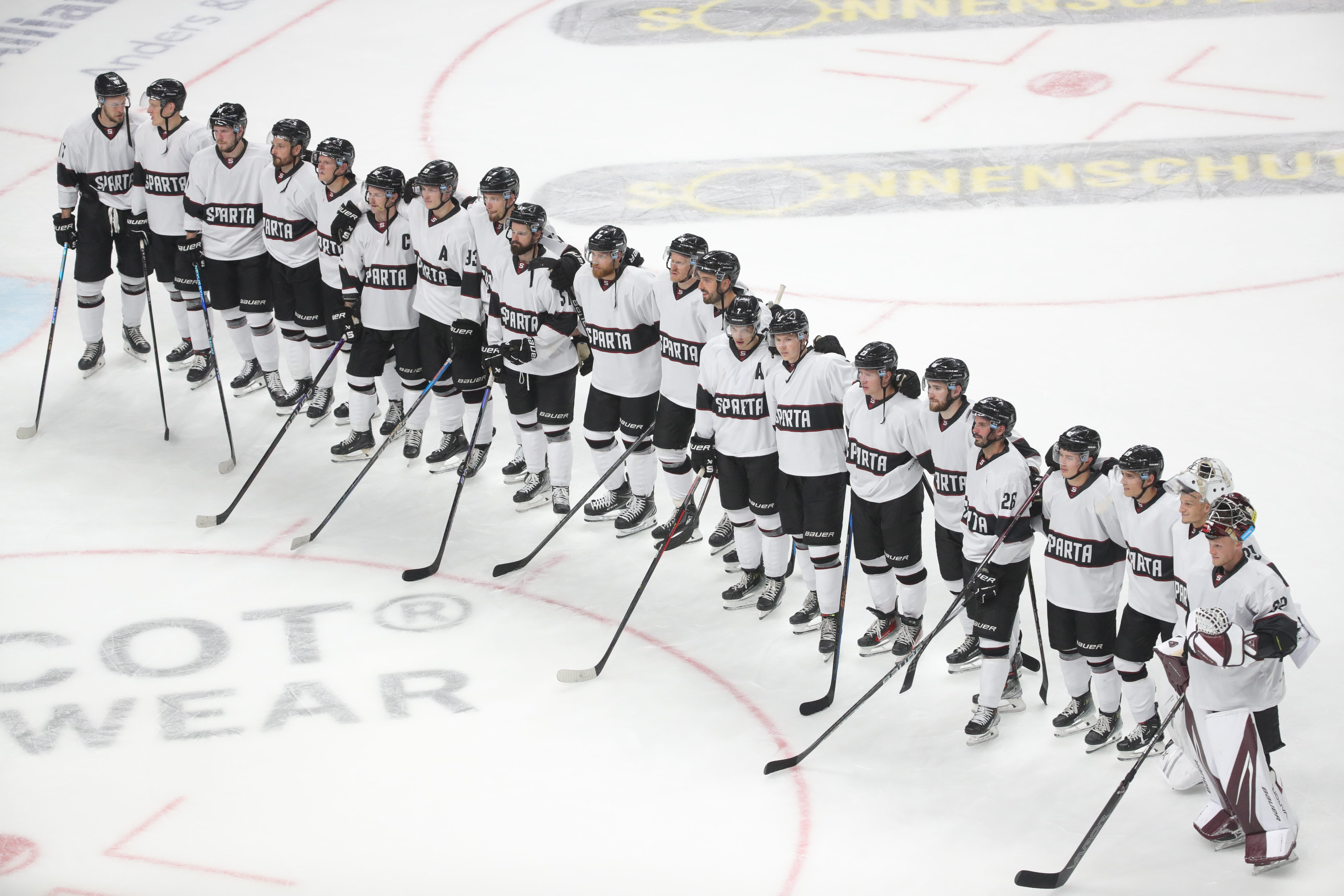
2023-24 season roster

HC Sparta Praha is one of the oldest hockey clubs in the world and one of the most successful and famous clubs in Czechoslovak and later Czech ice hockey history.

Sparta's great successes were reached in the years following World War II as it won two national titles in a row (1952/53 and 1953/54) under the name Spartak Sokolovo. The next highly successful period came much more recently when Sparta won the national league in 1989/90 and again in 1992/93. Another recent achievement (along with two third-place finishes in 1995/96 and 1996/97) was Sparta's participation in the final group of the European League (EHL) in 1996/97.

After a few unsuccessful years, Sparta returned to the top of the Czech Extraliga in 1999/00 when they were crowned league champions. That victory was the first of four championships they would win over seven seasons, adding Extraliga titles in 2001/02, 2005/06 and 2006/07. In addition to those achievements, Sparta managed to be finish second two times in European team competitions – 1999/00 European Hockey League and 2016–17 Champions Hockey League.

=== Present ===
HC Sparta Praha has regularly been one of the best teams in the Czech Extraliga, making the playoffs almost every year. HC Sparta Praha's home games are played at O2 Arena which is the largest hockey arena in the Czech Republic with a capacity of over 17,300 spectators. They moved there from the Tipsport Arena in 2015.

== Club logo ==
1993–2014

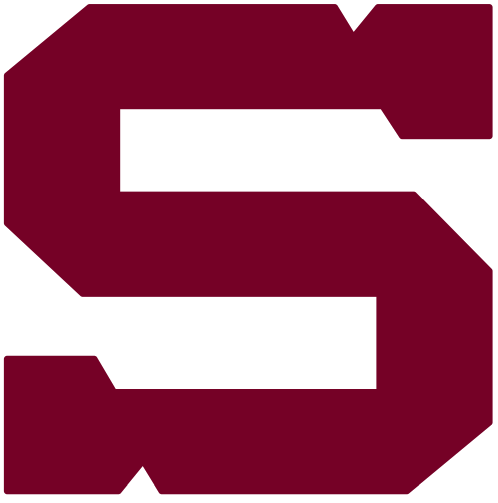
2014–

Alternative logo

== Honours ==
=== Domestic ===
Czech Extraliga

- (gold) Winners (4): 1999–00, 2001–02, 2005–06, 2006–07
- (silver) Runners-up (3): 2000–01, 2015–16, 2021–22
- (bronze) 3rd place (8): 1995–96, 1996–97, 2002–03, 2003–04, 2008–09, 2013–14, 2020–21, 2024–25

Czechoslovak Extraliga

- (gold) Winners (4): 1952–53, 1953–54, 1989–90, 1992–93
- (silver) Runners-up (7): 1936–37, 1937–38, 1956–57, 1962–63, 1966–67, 1973–74, 1987–88
- (bronze) 3rd place (6): 1955–56, 1960–61, 1964–65, 1967–68, 1976–77, 1986–87

Bohemian-Moravian League

- (bronze) 3rd place (4): 1939–40, 1940–41, 1941–42, 1942–43

=== International ===
Spengler Cup

- (gold) Winners (2): 1962, 1963
- (silver) Runners-up (2): 2004, 2022

Tatra Cup

- (gold) Winners (5): 1935/1936, 1950/1951, 1958/1959, 1959/1960, 1980

IIHF European Champions Cup

- (silver) Runners-up (1): 2008

European Hockey League

- (silver) Runners-up (1): 1999–00

Champions Hockey League

- (silver) Runners-up (1): 2016–17

=== Pre-season ===
Tipsport Hockey Cup

- (gold) Winners (2): 2001, 2009
- (silver) Runners-up (1): 2003

== Players ==
=== Current roster ===
As of 11 September 2024.

No.	Nat	Player	Pos	S/G	Age	Acquired	Birthplace
16	(Latvia)	Martins Dzierkals	C	L	29	2024	Riga, Latvia
51	(Czech Republic)	Roman Horák	C	L	35	2020	České Budějovice, Czechoslovakia
11	(Czech Republic)	Kryštof Hrabík	C	L	27	2023	Prague, Czech Republic
38	(Czech Republic)	Tomáš Hyka	RW	R	33	2024	Mladá Boleslav, Czech Republic
14	(Czech Republic)	Filip Chlapík (A)	C	L	29	2021	Prague, Czech Republic
26	(Canada)	Aaron Irving	D	R	30	2023	Edmonton, Alberta, Canada
47	(Finland)	Valtteri Kemiläinen	D	R	34	2024	Jyväskylä, Finland
6	(Czech Republic)	Michal Kempný (A)	D	L	36	2022	Hodonín, Czechoslovakia
32	(Czech Republic)	Josef Kořenář	G	L	28	2022	Pelhřimov, Czech Republic
23	(Czech Republic)	Pavel Kousal	LW	L	27	2023	Jihlava, Czech Republic
43	(Czech Republic)	Jakub Kovár	G	L	38	2023	Písek, Czechoslovakia
36	(Czech Republic)	Jakub Krejčík	D	L	35	2022	Prague, Czechoslovakia
25	(Finland)	Jani Lajunen (A)	C	L	36	2023	Espoo, Finland
–	(Czech Republic)	Dominik Mašín	D	L	30	2024	Městec Králové, Czech Republic
27	(Czech Republic)	Vojtěch Mozík	D	R	33	2023	Prague, Czechoslovakia
46	(Czech Republic)	Ondřej Najman	C	L	28	2023	Jihlava, Czech Republic
77	(Czech Republic)	David Němeček	D	L	31	2020	Plzeň, Czech Republic
10	(Canada)	Mark Pysyk	D	R	34	2025	Sherwood Park, Canada
26	(Czech Republic)	Michal Řepík (A)	RW	R	37	2019	Vlašim, Czechoslovakia
20	(Finland)	Miikka Salomäki	W	L	33	2024	Raahe, Finland
33	(Czech Republic)	Tomáš Tomek	D	L	23	2022	Prague, Czech Republic
42	(Czech Republic)	David Vitouch	LW	L	25	2019	Neratovice, Czech Republic
