= Dieter Orendorz =

German ice hockey player

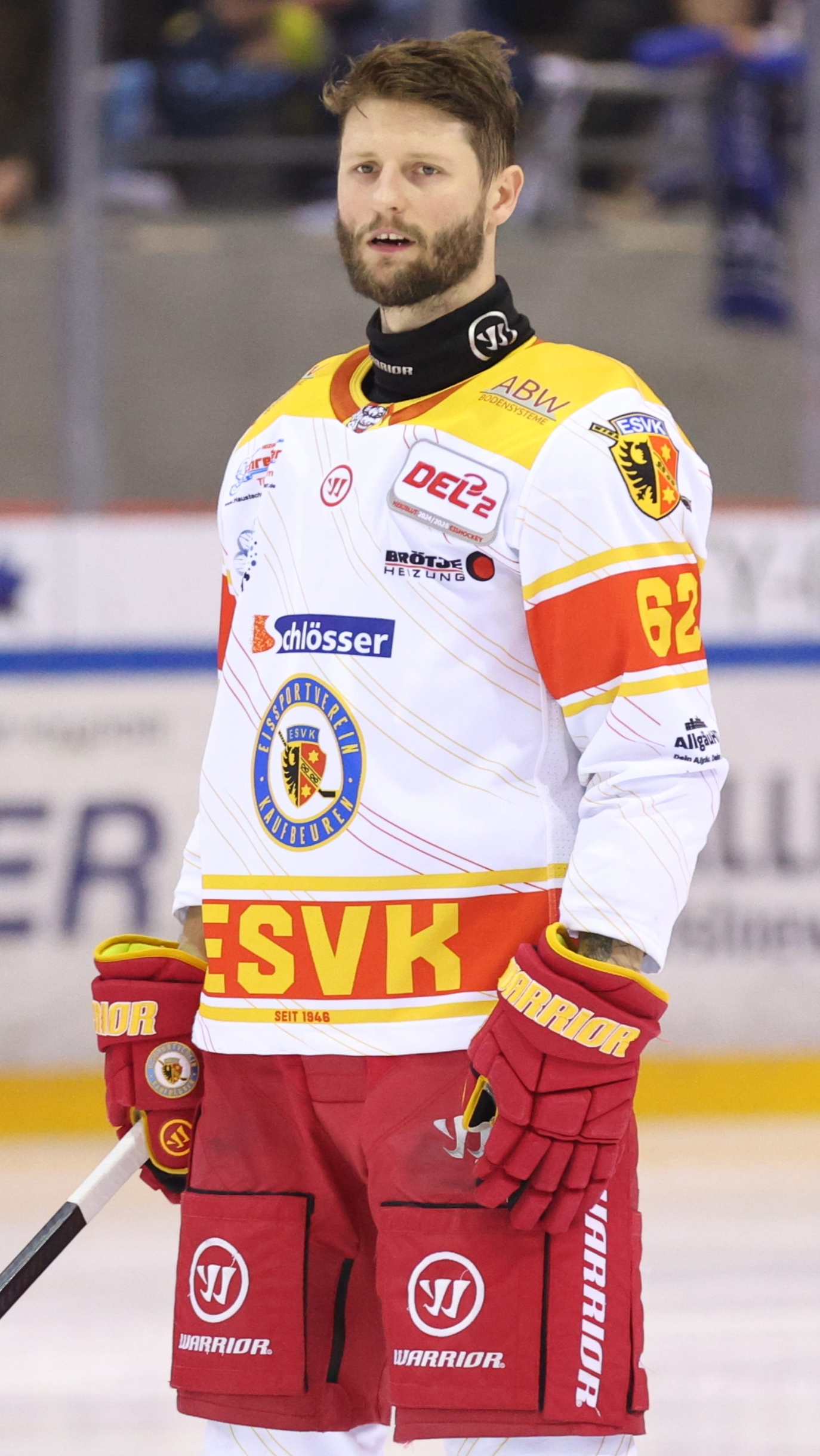
- Orendorz in 2024
- Born: 1 August 1992 (age 32); Iserlohn, Germany
- Height: 185 cm (6 ft 1 in)
- Weight: 94 kg (207 lb; 14 st 11 lb)
- Position: Defense
- Shoots: Left
- DEL2 team Former teams: ESV Kaufbeuren; Iserlohn Roosters
- Playing career: 2010–present

Dieter Orendorz (born 1 August 1992) is a German professional ice hockey defenceman, currently signed with ESV Kaufbeuren of the DEL2 for the 2022–23 season. His early career was played with the Iserlohn Roosters in the Deutsche Eishockey Liga (DEL) during 2009 to 2021.

In 2020, he married German national ice hockey team defenseman Rebecca Orendorz (née Graeve).
