= List of Barys Astana draft picks =

This is a complete list of ice hockey players who were drafted in the Kontinental Hockey League Junior draft by the Barys Astana team. It includes every player who was drafted, regardless of whether they played for the team.

== Draft picks ==
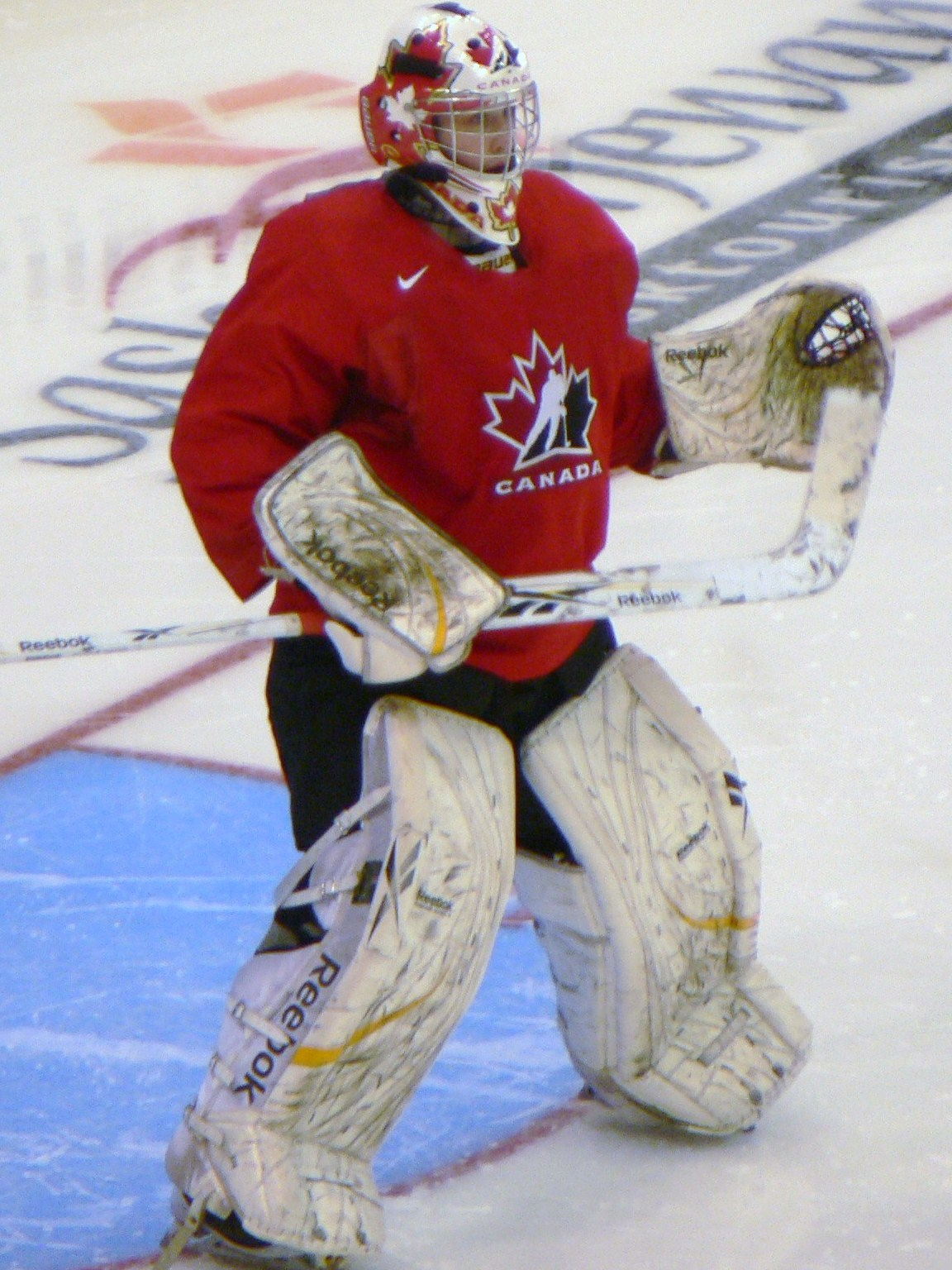
Olivier Roy, selected 88th overall in 2010

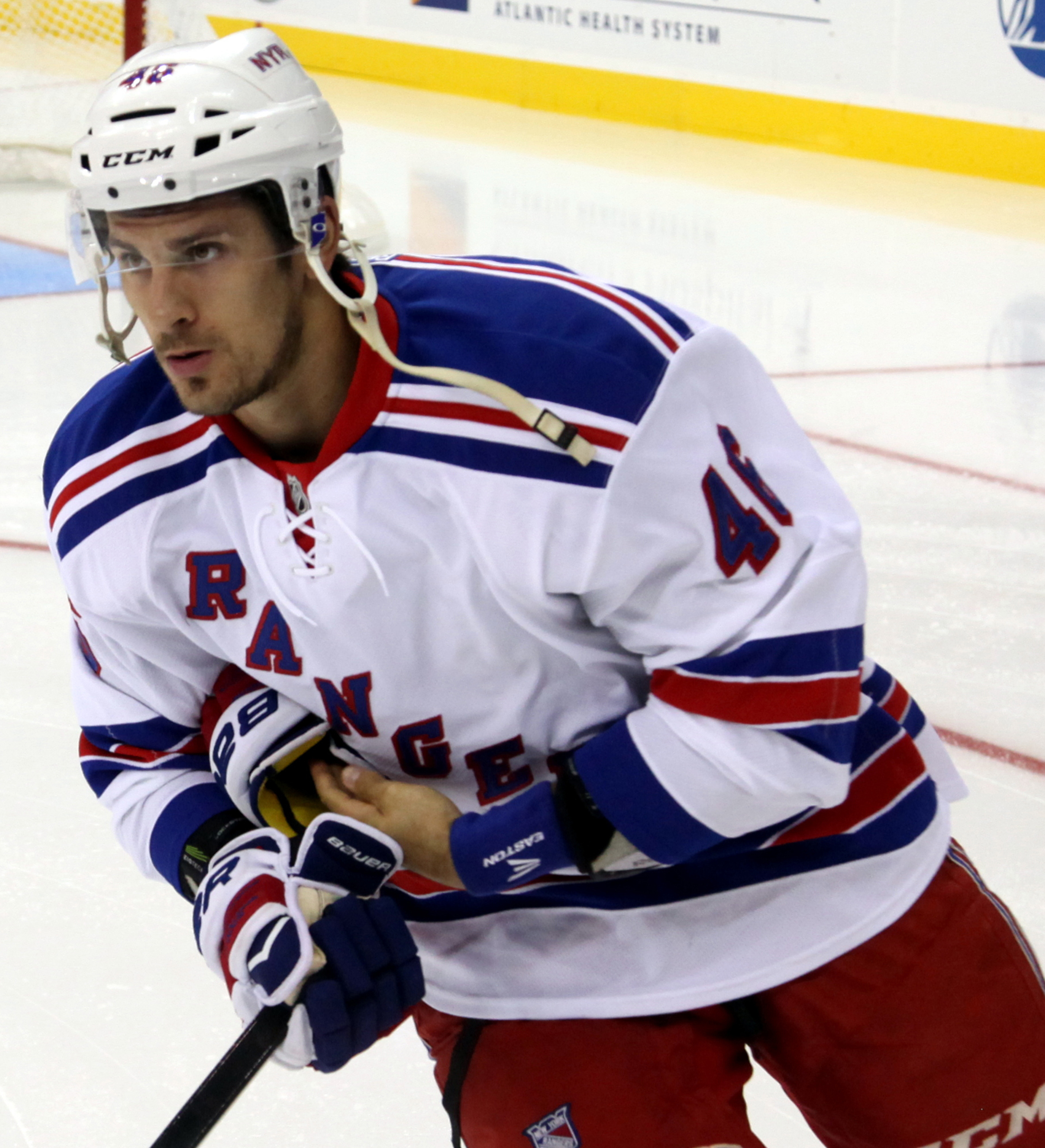
Marek Hrivík, selected 118th overall in 2010

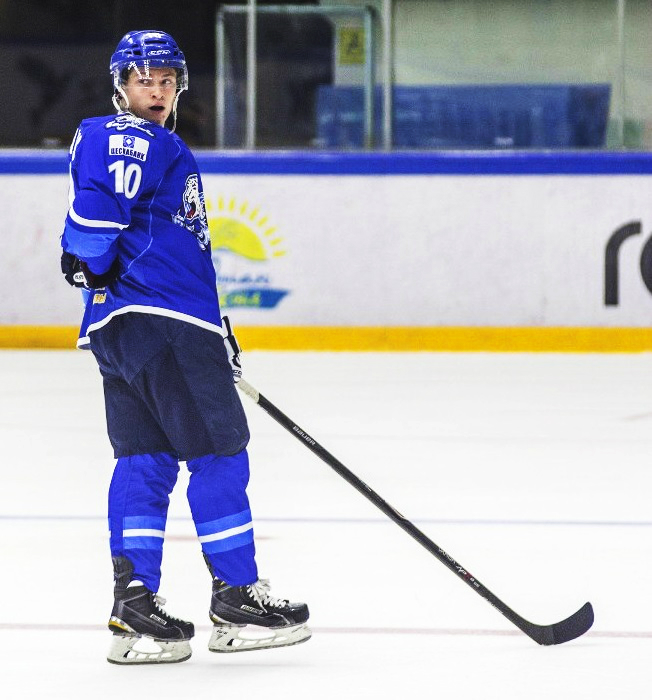
Nikita Mikhailis, selected 121st overall in 2012

Year	Round	Pick	Player	Nationality	Pos	Team from	League from
2009	3	55	Boris Novikov	Russia	D	MHC Krylya Sovetov	Junior Hockey League
2009	4	77	Kirill Alenikov	Russia	D	Stalnye Lisy	Junior Hockey League
2010	3	58	Timofei Tankeyev	Russia	C	Erie Otters	Ontario Hockey League
2010	4	88	Olivier Roy	Canada	G	Acadie-Bathurst Titan	Quebec Major Junior Hockey League
2010	5	107	Oleg Yevenko	Belarus	D	Fargo Force	United States Hockey League
2010	5	118	Marek Hrivík	Slovakia	LW	Moncton Wildcats	Quebec Major Junior Hockey League
2010	6	121	Adam Janosik	Slovakia	D	Gatineau Olympiques	Quebec Major Junior Hockey League
2010	7	146	Denis Chaltsev	Russia	G	St. Louis Jr. Blues	Central States Hockey League
2010	7	174	Danil Semyan	Russia	F	Grand Rapids Owls	Central States Hockey League
2011	2	38	Dmitri Sinitsyn	Russia	D	Dallas Stars U18	Midget AAA
2011	3	58	Alexander Nikulnikov	Russia	LW	Rouyn-Noranda Huskies	Quebec Major Junior Hockey League
2011	4	93	Evgeni Evseyev	Kazakhstan	D	Kazzinc-Torpedo-2	Kazakhstan Hockey Championship
2011	4	101	Nikolai Skladnichenko	Russia	C	Bobcaygeon Bucks	Greater Metro Junior A Hockey League
2011	5	120	Roman Stefan	Kazakhstan	D	Kazzinc-Torpedo-2	Kazakhstan Hockey Championship
2012	1	14	Madiyar Ibraibekov	Kazakhstan	D	Snezhnye Barsy	Junior Hockey League
2012	4	121	Nikita Mikhailis	Kazakhstan	F	Snezhnye Barsy	Junior Hockey League
2012	5	152	Ivan Stepanenko	Kazakhstan	D	Snezhnye Barsy	Junior Hockey League
2013	1	25	Kasperi Kapanen	Finland	LW	Kalevan Pallo	Liiga
2013	2	53	Kaapo Kähkönen	Finland	G	Espoo Blues	Liiga
2013	3	92	Dmitri Grents	Kazakhstan	F	Kazzinc-Torpedo-2	Kazakhstan Hockey Championship
2013	4	128	Alikhan Asetov	Kazakhstan	F	Kazzinc-Torpedo-2	Kazakhstan Hockey Championship
2014	1	33	Alexander Gaponov	Russia	D	Yunior Kurgan	Junior Hockey League
2014	2	81	Nikita Medvedev	Kazakhstan	D	Kazzinc-Torpedo-2	Kazakhstan Hockey Championship

Position abbreviations: G - Goaltender, D - Defenceman, LW - Left wing, C - Center, RW - Right wing, F - Forward

== See also ==
- 2009 KHL Junior Draft
- 2010 KHL Junior Draft
- 2011 KHL Junior Draft
- 2012 KHL Junior Draft
- 2013 KHL Junior Draft
- 2014 KHL Junior Draft
