= List of HC CSKA Moscow draft picks =

This is a complete list of ice hockey players who were drafted in the Kontinental Hockey League Junior draft by the CSKA Moscow franchise. It includes every player who was drafted, regardless of whether they played for the team. Mikhail Pashnin became the CSKA first junior draft pick during the 2009 KHL Junior Draft.

== Key ==
Played at least one game with the CSKA

Abbreviations for statistical columns
Pos	Position	GP	Games played
G	Goals	A	Assists
Pts	Points	PIM	Penalties in minutes
GAA	Goals against average	W	Wins
L	Losses	SV%	Save percentage
OT	Overtime or Shootout losses	–	Does not apply

Position abbreviations
G	Goaltender
D	Defenseman
LW	Left wing
C	Center
RW	Right wing
F	Forward

== Draft picks ==
Statistics are complete as of the 2012–13 KHL season and show each player's career regular season totals in the KHL. Wins, losses, ties, overtime losses and goals against average apply to goaltenders and are used only for players at that position. A player listed with a dash under the games played column has not played in the KHL.

Year	Round	Pick	Player	Nationality	Pos	GP	G	A	Pts	PIM	W	L	OT	SV%	GAA
2009	1	1	Mikhail Pashnin	Russia	D	168	7	9	16	158					
2009	2	33	Yuri Sheremetiev	Russia	RW										
2009	4	74	Alexander Fedoseyev	Russia	F	37	4	9	13	97					
2010	2	31	Artyom Sergeyev	Russia	D										
2010	2	46	Jakob Silfverberg	Sweden	LW/RW										
2010	3	57	Leonid Belenky	Russia	D										
2010	3	60	Nikita Kucherov	Russia	RW	27	1	6	7	4					
2010	4	96	Yegor Oseledets	Russia	G										
2010	5	97	Mikhail Naumenkov	Russia	D										
2010	6	124	Igor Fefelov	Russia	F										
2010	7	176	Sami Aittokallio	Finland	G										
2011	1	3	Alexander Timiryov	Russia	F										
2011	1	8	Mikhail Grigorenko	Russia	C										
2011	2	28	Zemgus Girgensons	Latvia	C/RW										
2011	2	33	Adam Almqvis	Sweden	D										
2011	4	88	Denis Kamaev	Russia	LW										
2011	4	105	Nikita Lisov	Russia	D										
2011	5	115	Dmitri Ogurtsov	Russia	D										
2012	1	4	Nikita Zadorov	Russia	D										
2012	1	6	Vladislav Boiko	Russia	F										
2012	1	18	Andrei Filonenko	Russia	G										
2012	1	28	Sergei Tolchinsky	Russia	F										
2012	2	44	Maxim Mamin	Russia	LW										
2012	3	78	Georgy Makkaev	Russia	D										
2012	3	79	Danila Koo	Russia	D										
2012	4	112	Artyom Prokhorov	Russia	F										
2012	5	142	Viktor Zakharov	Ukraine	F										
2013	1	12	Maxim Tretiak	Russia	G										
2013	1	29	Ivan Nikolishin	Russia	F										
2013	2	45	Andrei Kuzmenko	Russia	F										
2013	2	57	Alexei Sleptsov	Russia	D										
2013	3	77	Yegor Ogiyenko	Russia	D										
2013	3	79	Ivan Silayev	Russia	F										
2013	3	80	Andrei Svetlakov	Russia	F										
2013	4	114	Yevgeni Voronkov	Russia	D										
2013	5	158	Kirill Kovalevsky	Russia	F										

== See also ==
- 2009 KHL Junior Draft
- 2010 KHL Junior Draft
- 2011 KHL Junior Draft
- 2012 KHL Junior Draft
