= Hovinen =

Hovinen is a Finnish surname. Notable people with the surname include:

- Miro Hovinen (born 1992), Finnish ice hockey player
- Niko Hovinen (born 1988), Finnish ice hockey player
- Seppo Hovinen (born 1951), Finnish javelin thrower

== See also ==
- Huovinen
