= List of first overall KHL draft picks =

The KHL Junior Draft is a collective meeting in which the franchises of the Kontinental Hockey League systematically select the rights to available amateur players who meet the eligibility requirements to play professional hockey in the KHL. Over the seasons, the format has followed a set pattern and variable numbers of players have been taken in each season.

Seven players have been taken first. Of those, six players have been Russian in nationality, and one Czech.

== First overall picks ==
Key

¤	Never played a game in the KHL
^	Alexei Cherepanov Trophy winner

Draft	Selected by	Player	Nat.	Position	Amateur/junior/former club	League
2009	CSKA Moscow	Mikhail Pashnin	Russia	Defenceman	Mechel Chelyabinsk	RUS 2
2010	Sibir Novosibirsk	Dmitri Jaškin ^{¤}	Czech Republic	Forward	VHK Vsetín	2. liga
2011	Metallurg Novokuznetsk	Anton Slepyshev	Russia	Forward	Dizel Penza	RUS 3
2012	SKA Saint Petersburg	Denis Alexandrov	Russia	Defenceman	PHC Krylya Sovetov	MHL
2013	Amur Khabarovsk	Dmitry Osipov ^{¤}	Russia	Defenceman		
2014	Metallurg Novokuznetsk	Kirill Kaprizov	Russia	Forward	Kuznetskie Medvedi	MHL
2015	HC Sochi	Artyom Maltsev ^{¤}	Russia	Defenceman	SKA-Serebryanye Lvy	MHL
