= Ogurtsov =

Ogurtsov (Russian: Огурцов; masculine) or Ogurtsova (Огурцо́ва; feminine) is a Russian last name. Possibly a variant of the last name Agureyev, it might also be a derivative from the nickname "Огурец" (Ogurets), which literally means cucumber. This possibility, however, is discounted by some researchers.

People with the last name

- Alexey Ogurtsov, Russian actor who played Spirid in the 2014 dark fantasy movie Viy
- Artyom Ogurtsov, Russian association football player who played for PBC CSKA Moscow in 1999–2000
- Bazhen Ogurtsov, an architect who contributed to the construction of the Spasskaya Tower of the Moscow Kremlin
- Dmitry Ogurtsov, Russian ice hockey player 2011 HC CSKA Moscow draft pick
- Dmitry Ogurtsov, member of the Young Guard, a Soviet resistance group
- Igor Ogurtsov, co-founder of VSHSON, an underground anti-Soviet organization
- Nikolay Ogurtsov (b. 1996), Russian association football player
- Mariya Ohurtsova (Ogurtsova) (b. 1983), retired Ukrainian swimmer
- Sergey Ogurtsov, birth name of Sergey Lemokh (b. 1965), Russian singer
- Sergey Ogurtsov, head of Sochi Police, Russia

Fictional characters

- Serafim Ogurtsov, a character in the 1956 Soviet musical Carnival Night

== See also ==
- Ogurtsovo, several rural localities in Russia
