= List of Dinamo Riga draft picks =

This is a complete list of ice hockey players who were drafted in the Kontinental Hockey League Junior draft by the Dinamo Riga franchise. It includes every player who was drafted, regardless of whether they played for the team. Roberts Bukarts became the Dinamo first junior draft pick during the 2009 KHL Junior Draft.

== Key ==
Abbreviations for statistical columns
Pos	Position	GP	Games played
G	Goals	A	Assists
Pts	Points	PIM	Penalties in minutes
GAA	Goals against average	W	Wins
L	Losses	SV%	Save percentage
OT	Overtime or Shootout losses	–	Does not apply

Position abbreviations
G	Goaltender
D	Defenseman
LW	Left wing
C	Center
RW	Right wing
F	Forward

== Draft picks ==
Statistics are complete as of the 2014–15 KHL season and show each player's career regular season totals in the KHL. Wins, losses, ties, overtime losses and goals against average apply to goaltenders and are used only for players at that position. A player listed with a dash under the games played column has not played in the KHL.

Year	Round	Pick	Player	Nationality	Pos	GP	G	A	Pts	PIM	W	L	OT	SV%	GAA
2009	1	13	Roberts Bukarts	Latvia	LW	199	23	25	48	50					
2009	2	36	Roberts Jekimovs	Latvia	LW/RW										
2009	3	59	Ainārs Podziņš	Latvia	LW/C	96	6	6	12	40					
2009	4	82	Andris Džeriņš	Latvia	C	205	23	18	41	110					
2010	2	37	Eddy Rinke-Leitans	Germany/Latvia	RW										
2010	3	59	Edgars Lipsbergs	Latvia	C										
2010	4	89	Victor Rask	Sweden	C										
2010	6	122	Niclas Lucenius	Finland	C	53	0	15	15	33					
2010	7	147	Kristers Gudļevskis	Latvia	G	2	0	0	0	0	1	1	0	92.1	2.18
2010	7	175	Kristiāns Pelšs	Latvia	LW										
2011	2	39	Teodors Bļugers	Latvia	C/LW										
2011	3	68	Alexander Ruuttu	Finland	C/RW										
2011	5	121	Jarrod Rabey	United States	D										
2011	5	128	Toms Andersons	Latvia	RW										
2012	1	9	Rihards Bukarts	Latvia	LW										
2012	2	48	Georgs Golovkovs	Latvia	F										
2012	3	79	Elvis Merzļikins	Latvia	G										
2012	5	146	Ralf Rinke	Germany	F										
2013	2	39	Filip Pyrochta	Czech Republic	D										
2013	3	68	Christian Jaros	Slovakia	F										
2013	4	109	Dāvis Zembergs	Latvia	F										
2013	5	143	Rodrigo Ābols	Latvia	C										
2014	1	25	Travis Konecny	Canada	C										
2014	1	26	Jérémy Roy	Canada	D										
2014	2	78	Andrej Hatala	Slovakia	D										
2014	3	123	Roman Dymacek	Czech Republic	F										
2014	4	157	Kristiāns Rubīns	Latvia	D										
2014	4	167	Rihards Puide	Latvia	LW										
2014	5	192	Gvido Jansons	Latvia	D										
2015	2	36	Patrik Laine	Finland	RW										
2015	2	39	Linus Lindström	Sweden	C										
2015	3	63	Markus Niemeläinen	Finland	D										
2015	5	114	Roberts Bļugers	Latvia	F										
2015	5	132	Gustavs Dāvis Grigals	Latvia	G										

== See also ==
- 2009 KHL Junior Draft
- 2010 KHL Junior Draft
- 2011 KHL Junior Draft
- 2012 KHL Junior Draft
- 2013 KHL Junior Draft
