= Soviet Wings =

Soviet Wings may refer to:

- Krylya Sovetov Moscow, ice hockey club that competes in the Russian VHL
- MHC Krylya Sovetov, former ice hockey club that competed in the Russian VHL and MHL
- Soviet Wings Sport Palace, home of the two above teams, in Moscow, Russia.
- Soviet Wings (IHL), touring Russian ice hockey club that played in the International Hockey League for one season
- USC Soviet Wings, universal sports hall, it can also be used to host boxing matches, in Moscow, Russia.
