= Dmitri Gromov =

Dmitri Gromov may refer to:

- Dmitri Gromov (figure skater) (born 1967), Russian figure skater
- Dmitri Gromov (ice hockey) (born 1991), Russian ice hockey player
