= Krylya Sovetov =

Krylya Sovetov (Russian: Крылья Советов, literally Wings of the Soviets or Soviet Wings) was a sports society in the Soviet Union affiliated with aviation/aerospace industry. Today, it may refer to:

- PFC Krylia Sovetov Samara, football club from Samara, Russia
- FC Krylia Sovetov-SOK, football club from Dimitrovgrad, Russia
- Krylya Sovetov (Samara Metro), a station of the Samara Metro, Samara, Russia
- Krylya Sovetov Moscow, defunct ice hockey club that played in the top Soviet/Russian divisions from 1947 to 2011
- MHC Krylya Sovetov, ice hockey club that competes in the Russian MHL
- PHC Krylya Sovetov, ice hockey club that competes in the Russian VHL
