= Nikita Zaitsev =

Russian ice hockey player (born 1991)

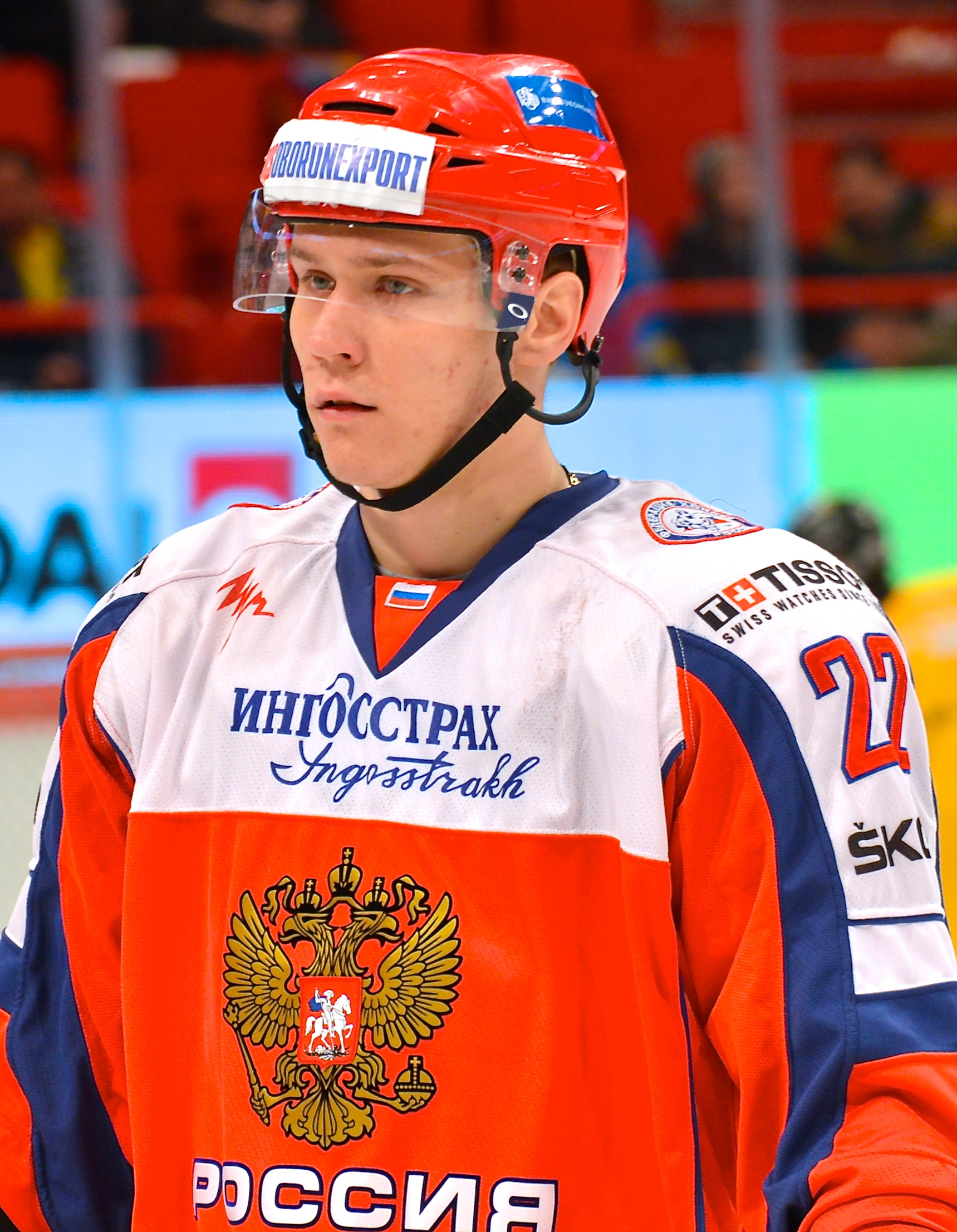
- Zaitsev with Russia in 2014
- Born: 29 October 1991 (age 35) Moscow, Russian SFSR, Soviet Union
- Height: 6 ft 2 in (188 cm)
- Weight: 195 lb (88 kg; 13 st 13 lb)
- Position: Defence
- Shoots: Right
- KHL team Former teams: SKA Saint Petersburg; Sibir Novosibirsk; CSKA Moscow; Toronto Maple Leafs; Ottawa Senators; Chicago Blackhawks
- National team: Russia
- NHL draft: Undrafted
- Playing career: 2009–present

Nikita Igorevich Zaitsev (Russian: Никита Игоревич Зайцев; born 29 October 1991) is a Russian professional ice hockey defenceman currently playing for SKA Saint Petersburg of the Kontinental Hockey League (KHL).

== Playing career ==
=== KHL ===
Zaitsev was selected by Sibir Novosibirsk of the Kontinental Hockey League (KHL) in the first round, fourth overall, of the 2009 KHL Junior Draft, making his debut for the club a few months later. After four years with the Sibir organization, Zaitsev joined his hometown CSKA Moscow, after which he began to attract international attention. He was twice a KHL All-Star (2015, 2016) and named once to the KHL First All-Star team (2014–15).

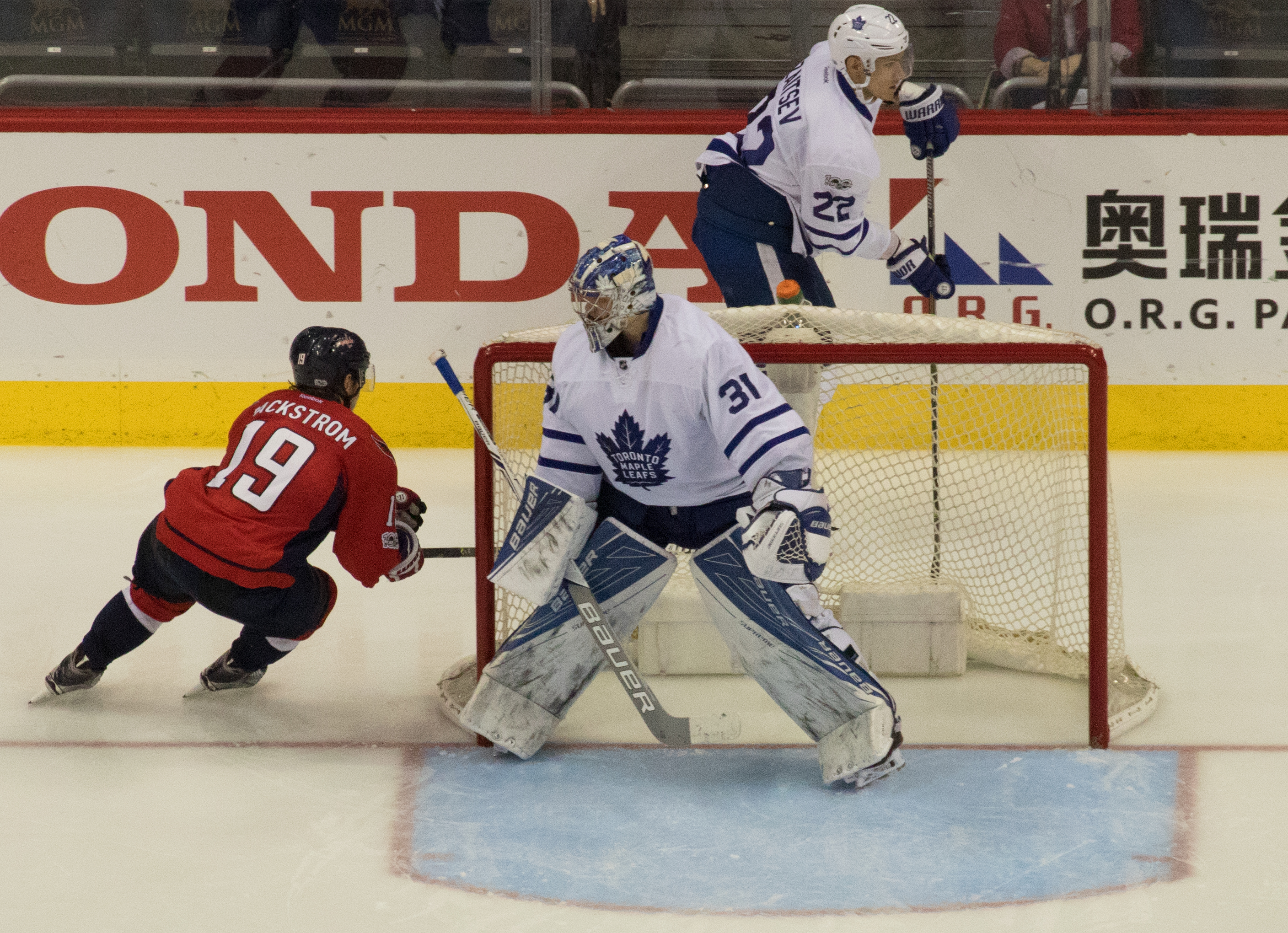
Zaitsev (behind the net) defending the puck from Nicklas Bäckström (left) in a playoff game against the Washington Capitals in 2017.

In the summer of 2015, the National Hockey League (NHL)'s Toronto Maple Leafs began to garner publicized interest in Zaitsev; Zaitsev had even toured the city and arena, while also meeting with team staff, coming away "very impressed". Despite this, Zaitsev returned to Russia to honour the final year of his contract with CSKA. During the subsequent season's playoffs, he led all defencemen in scoring with 13 points (tied with Sami Lepistö and Chris Lee), while helping the top-seeded CSKA to the Gagarin Cup finals, where the team lost in the deciding Game 7 to Metallurg Magnitogorsk.

=== NHL ===
==== Toronto Maple Leafs ====
On 2 May 2016, Zaitsev signed a one-year, entry-level contract with the Maple Leafs. He made his pre-season debut with the club on 2 October, scoring a goal in a 3–2 win over the rival Montreal Canadiens. On 12 October 2016, Zaitsev made his official NHL debut in a 5–4 loss to the Ottawa Senators in the 2016–17 season opener, and was singled out for his good play by coach Mike Babcock. He scored his first NHL goal on 17 December 2016 against the Pittsburgh Penguins. By the end of the season, Zaitsev had accumulated 36 points, second most on the team and had earned a top-four spot among Toronto's defencemen, playing on the penalty kill and power play units. In the playoffs, Zaitsev missed the first two games and upon his return, was tasked with shutting down Alexander Ovechkin's line in the Maple Leafs' series with the Washington Capitals. The Capitals went on to beat the Maple Leafs in six games.

On 2 May 2017, Zaitsev signed a new seven-year, $31.5 million contract with Toronto carrying an average annual value of $4.5 million. This was based on his play from the previous season where he was one of the minutes played leaders among Maple Leafs' defencemen. During the 2017–18 season, Zaitsev was placed on injured reserve (IR) with a lower body injury on 17 December 2017. He had 7 points in 18 games with Toronto before being placed on IR. After missing 17 games, he returned to the lineup on 30 January 2018 for a game against the New York Islanders. Though used heavily by the Maple Leafs his play was not as good as in his first season and he only amassed 13 points in 60 games. He finished the 2018–19 season with 14 points in 81 games and faced criticism for his play during the playoffs in which he led the Maple Leafs in turnovers with 11. That offseason Zaitsev reportedly requested a trade out of Toronto.

==== Ottawa Senators ====
On 1 July 2019, Zaitsev was traded (along with Connor Brown and Michael Carcone) to the Ottawa Senators in exchange for Cody Ceci, Ben Harpur, Aaron Luchuk and a third-round pick in the 2020 NHL entry draft. In his first season with the Senators, Zaitsev was paired with Thomas Chabot on the team's top defence pairing and was named one of the team's alternate captains. The Senators head coach, D. J. Smith, played Zaitsev as a defensive defenceman, playing against the opposing team's top players. Zaitsev struggled through the following pandemic-shortened 2021–22 season, being paired with multiple partners in an effort to find some chemistry. He was among the players that missed time after being placed on the COVID protocol list in November. In December Zaitsev was injured in a game versus the Tampa Bay Lightning, forcing him to miss four weeks.

Senators general manager Pierre Dorion attempted to trade Zaitsev during the 2022 offseason but could find no partners. His play to begin the 2022–23 season was "tumultuous" and he was placed on waivers on 9 November 2022. Zaitsev cleared waivers on 10 November and was demoted to the Senators' American Hockey League (AHL) affiliate, the Belleville Senators, on 18 November. He played in three games in the AHL before being recalled on 1 December.

==== Chicago Blackhawks ====
On 22 February 2023, Zaitsev was traded with a second-round pick in 2023 (Roman Kantserov) and a fourth-round pick in 2026 to the Chicago Blackhawks for future considerations. He made his Chicago debut on 4 March in a 3–1 loss to the Nashville Predators. He scored his first goal with the Blackhawks on 23 March, preventing a shutout in a 6–1 loss to the Washington Capitals. In his second season with Chicago, Zaitsev injured his right knee in a game versus the San Jose Sharks on 16 January 2024. He returned to the lineup on 9 March.

=== Return to KHL ===
On 4 July 2024, as an unrestricted free agent, Zaitsev returned to the KHL, signing a four-year contract with SKA St. Petersburg.

== Career statistics ==
=== Regular season and playoffs ===
			Regular season					Playoffs
Season	Team	League	GP	G	A	Pts	PIM	GP	G	A	Pts	PIM
2008–09	MHC Krylya Sovetov	RUS.2	8	0	0	0	0	3	0	0	0	2
2008–09	MHC Krylya Sovetov–2	RUS.4	23	6	12	18	24	—	—	—	—	—
2009–10	Sibir Novosibirsk	KHL	40	0	1	1	6	—	—	—	—	—
2009–10	Siberian Snipers	MHL	4	0	1	1	2	—	—	—	—	—
2010–11	Sibir Novosibirsk	KHL	39	0	2	2	12	4	0	0	0	2
2010–11	Siberian Snipers	MHL	4	1	2	3	0	—	—	—	—	—
2010–11	Zauralie Kurgan	VHL	—	—	—	—	—	4	0	2	2	4
2011–12	Sibir Novosibirsk	KHL	53	1	3	4	28	—	—	—	—	—
2011–12	Siberian Snipers	MHL	4	4	0	4	0	—	—	—	—	—
2012–13	Sibir Novosibirsk	KHL	49	7	11	18	41	7	1	0	1	8
2013–14	CSKA Moscow	KHL	33	4	8	12	18	4	1	1	2	27
2014–15	CSKA Moscow	KHL	57	12	20	32	31	16	1	7	8	2
2015–16	CSKA Moscow	KHL	46	8	18	26	20	20	4	9	13	10
2016–17	Toronto Maple Leafs	NHL	82	4	32	36	38	4	0	0	0	0
2017–18	Toronto Maple Leafs	NHL	60	5	8	13	31	7	0	2	2	2
2018–19	Toronto Maple Leafs	NHL	81	3	11	14	18	7	0	0	0	2
2019–20	Ottawa Senators	NHL	58	1	11	12	22	—	—	—	—	—
2020–21	Ottawa Senators	NHL	55	4	13	17	26	—	—	—	—	—
2021–22	Ottawa Senators	NHL	62	2	9	11	28	—	—	—	—	—
2022–23	Ottawa Senators	NHL	28	0	5	5	8	—	—	—	—	—
2022–23	Belleville Senators	AHL	3	0	0	0	2	—	—	—	—	—
2022–23	Chicago Blackhawks	NHL	18	1	2	3	12	—	—	—	—	—
2023–24	Chicago Blackhawks	NHL	38	2	5	7	14	—	—	—	—	—
2024–25	SKA Saint Petersburg	KHL	58	1	9	10	29	4	0	2	2	2
2025–26	SKA Saint Petersburg	KHL	18	0	0	0	8	—	—	—	—	—
KHL totals			393	33	72	105	193	55	7	19	26	51
NHL totals			482	22	96	118	197	18	0	2	2	4

=== International ===
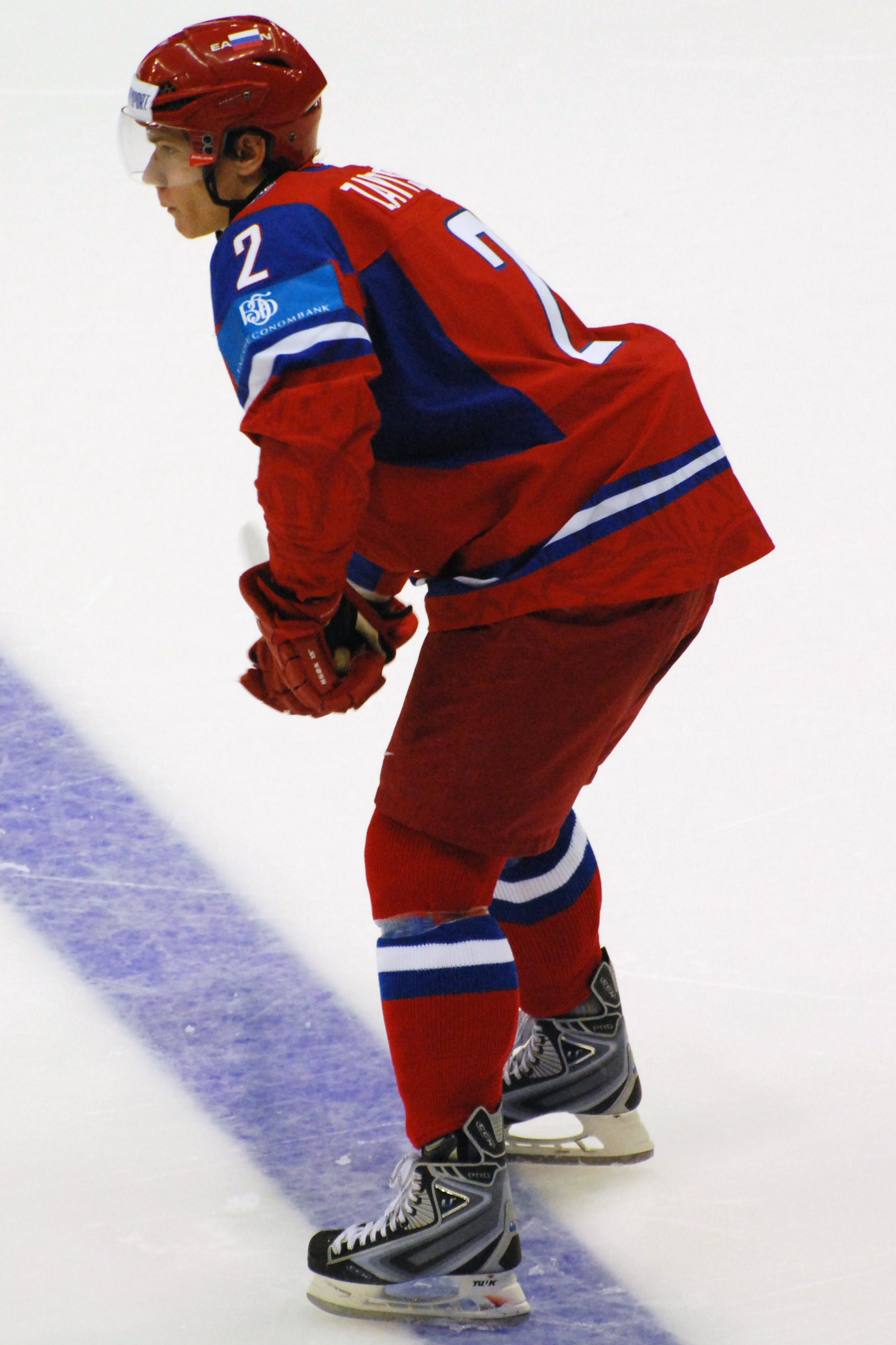
- Zaitsev at the 2010 World Junior Championships

Medal record

Ice hockey

Representing Russia

World Championships
Bronze medal – third place	2016 Russia	
Bronze medal – third place	2019 Slovakia	

World Junior Championships
Gold medal – first place	2011 United States	

World U18 Championships
Silver medal – second place	2009 United States	

Year	Team	Event	Result	GP	G	A	Pts	PIM
2009	Russia	WJC18	2nd place, silver medalist(s)	7	1	4	5	14
2010	Russia	WJC	6th	6	0	0	0	4
2011	Russia	WJC	1st place, gold medalist(s)	6	0	0	0	0
2013	Russia	WC	6th	3	1	0	1	0
2016	Russia	WC	3rd place, bronze medalist(s)	10	1	3	4	2
2016	Russia	WCH	4th	4	0	2	2	2
2018	Russia	WC	6th	8	0	8	8	0
2019	Russia	WC	3rd place, bronze medalist(s)	10	2	2	4	0
Junior totals				19	1	4	5	18
Senior totals				35	4	15	19	4

== Awards and honours ==
Award or Honour	Year	Ref
KHL
All-Star Game	2015, 2016	
First All Star Team	2015	
Most playoff points by a defenceman (13)	2016	
International
WC All-Star Team	2016	
