= KHL Junior Draft =

The KHL Junior Draft was an annual meeting in which every franchise of the Kontinental Hockey League (KHL) systematically selected the rights to available amateur ice hockey players who met draft eligibility requirements (17–21 years old, no active KHL, MHL or VHL contract). The KHL Junior Draft was held once every year, generally within two to three months after the conclusion of the previous season. During the draft, teams took turns selecting amateur players from junior, collegiate, or European leagues.

The first draft was held on June 1, 2009, before the second KHL season, and was held every year until it was ended in 2016. Mikhail Pashnin, drafted by CSKA Moscow, was the first player to be drafted in the KHL Junior Draft. The first KHL Junior Draft held had only 85 drafted players, but with 188 players in the 2010 Draft the number of drafted players that year was more than doubled. However, the number of drafted players decreased in the 2011 Draft, with 134 drafted players. The peak count came in 2014 when 208 players were drafted. Overall, over the 8 years, 1,241 players were drafted, giving an average of 155 drafted players per year.

== Eligible players ==
All European or North American players who were 17 years old and not older than 21 years old, and did not have any active contracts with a KHL, MHL or VHL team, were eligible for selection for that year's KHL Junior Draft.

== Drafting order ==
The teams with the three worst regular-season records (or a team involved in a trade with such a team where a draft pick was included in the trade and, if applicable, a KHL team afflicted by a disaster during the season) were eligible to take part in a lottery whose aim was to decide the first three (or four, depending on circumstances) picks.

== List of KHL Junior Drafts ==
Draft	Location	City	Date	Total drafted	#1 pick
2009	Gazprom Export HQ	Moscow, Russia	June 1, 2009	91	(Russia) Mikhail Pashnin (CSKA Moscow)
2010	KHL HQ	Moscow, Russia	June 4, 2010	188	(Czech Republic) Dmitrij Jaškin (Sibir Novosibirsk)
2011	Mytishchi Arena	Mytishchi, Russia	May 28, 2011	134	(Russia) Anton Slepyshev (Metallurg Novokuznetsk)
2012	Traktor Sport Palace	Chelyabinsk, Russia	May 25, 2012 and May 26, 2012	166	(Russia) Denis Alexandrov (SKA Saint Petersburg)
2013	Druzhba Arena	Donetsk, Ukraine	May 25, 2013 and May 26, 2013	174	(Russia) Dmitri Osipov (Amur Khabarovsk)
2014	Ice Palace	Saint Petersburg, Russia	May 8, 2014	208	(Russia) Kirill Kaprizov (Metallurg Novokuznetsk)
2015	VTB Ice Palace	Moscow, Russia	May 24, 2015	133	(Russia) Artyom Maltsev (HC Sochi)
2016	Renaissance Moscow Monarch Center Hotel	Moscow, Russia	May 23, 2016	147	(Russia) Venyamin Baranov (Admiral Vladivostok)

== See also ==
- 2013 KHL Expansion Draft
- KHL territorial pick
- List of first overall KHL draft picks
- NHL entry draft
