= 2016 KHL Junior Draft =

General information
- Date: 23 May 2016

Overview
- League: KHL
- First selection: (Russia) Venyamin Baranov; Selected by: Admiral Vladivostok

The 2016 KHL Junior Draft was the eighth and final entry draft held by the Kontinental Hockey League (KHL), taking place on 23 May 2016. Ice hockey players from around the world aged between 17 and 21 years of age were selected. Players eligible to take part in the draft were required to not have an active contract with a KHL, MHL or VHL team.

== Selections by round ==
=== Round 1 ===
Rank	Player	Position	Nationality	KHL team	Drafted from
1	Venyamin Baranov	D	Russia	Admiral Vladivostok	Dynamo St. Petersburg
2	Alexander Alemastsev	F	Russia	Avtomobilist Yekaterinburg	Yuzhny Ural-Metallurg Orsk
3	Alexander Alexeyev	D	Russia	Metallurg Novokuznetsk	Serebryanye Lvy
4	Yegor Filin	F	Russia	HC CSKA Moscow	Dizelist Penza (MHL-B)
5	Sebastian Aho	D	Sweden	Vityaz Podolsk	Skellefteå AIK
6	Ivan Prosvetov	G	Russia	HC Sochi	Rus Moscow
7	Aapeli Räsänen	F	Finland	Dinamo Riga	Tampereen Tappara
8	Nikita Radzivilyuk	D	Russia	HC Spartak Moscow	Tyumenski Legion
9	Erno Gerlander	G	Finland	KHL Medveščak Zagreb	Helsingin Jokerit
10	Martin Nečas	F	Czech Republic	Traktor Chelyabinsk	HC Kometa Brno
11	Maxim Sushko	F	Belarus	Dinamo Minsk	Shakhtyor Soligorsk-2
12	Paruk Sadykov	F	Kazakhstan	Barys Astana	Barys Astana
13	Yegor Zaplatnikov	F	Russia	SKA St. Petersburg	Almaz Cherepovets
14	Adam Ruzicka	F	Slovakia	HC Slovan Bratislava	HC Pardubice
15	Yegor Vernigor	F	Russia	Avtomobilist Yekaterinburg	Avto Yekaterinburg
16	Kirill Ustimenko	G	Russia	Admiral Vladivostok	Dynamo St. Petersburg
17	Santeri Virtanen	F	Finland	Ak Bars Kazan	HC TPS
18	Samu Perhonen	G	Finland	Vityaz Podolsk	HPK
19	Kristian Vesalainen	F	Finland	SKA St. Petersburg	Frölunda HC
20	Dominik Kubalík	F	Czech Republic	Salavat Yulaev Ufa	HC Plzeň
21	Danil Pyatin	F	Russia	Metallurg Magnitogorsk	Metallurg Magnitogorsk
22	Daniil Rukosuyev	F	Russia	Admiral Vladivostok	Dynamo St. Petersburg
23	Alexei Chirkin	P	Russia	HC Dynamo Moscow	Dynamo Moscow
24	Oskar Sundqvist	F	Sweden	Avangard Omsk	Pittsburgh Penguins
25	Alexei Zhilin	H	Russia	HC Sochi	Rus Moscow
26	Markus Nutivaara	D	Finland	Helsingin Jokerit	Oulun Kärpät
27	Peter Cehlárik	F	Slovakia	Lokomotiv Yaroslavl	Luleå HF
28	Matěj Stránský	F	Czech Republic	HC CSKA Moscow	Texas Stars
29	Artur Rayn	F	Russia	Admiral Vladivostok	Traktor Chelyabinsk
30	Yuri Groshev	G	Sweden	Admiral Vladivostok	Salavat Yulaev Ufa
31	Linus Arnesson	D	Sweden	Lokomotiv Jaroslavl	Providence Bruins
32	Daniel Zaar	F	Sweden	Lokomotiv Yaroslavl	Lake Erie Monsters
33	Mikael Wikstrand	D	Sweden	Lokomotiv Yaroslavl	Färjestad BK

=== Round 2 ===
Rank	Player	Position	Nationality	KHL team	Drafted from
34	Igor Tumchenko	H	Russia	Metallurg Novokuznetsk	SKA Varyagi
35	Alexander Fyodorov	D	Russia	Avtomobilist Yekaterinburg	Tyumenski Legion
36	Tagir Galiakhmetov	F	Russia	Neftekhimik Nizhnekamsk	Neftekhimik Nizhnekamsk
37	Alexei Mashkov	F	Russia	Amur Khabarovsk	
38	Mikhail Gushchin	F	Russia	Yugra Khanty-Mansiysk	Yunost Yekaterinburg
39	Gustav Possler	F	Sweden	Dinamo Riga	Modo Hockey
40	Daniil Ogirchuk	F	Russia	SKA St. Petersburg	SKA Varyagi
41	Filip Hronek	D	Czech Republic	Salavat Yulaev Ufa	Mountfield HK
42	Artur Gilyazeyev	D	Russia	Traktor Chelyabinsk	Traktor Chelyabinsk
43	Victor Olofsson	F	Sweden	HC CSKA Moscow	Modo Hockey
44	Valeri Orekhov	D	Kazakhstan	Barys Astana	Barys Astana
45	Yegor Fedin	D	Russia	HK Sochi	Rus Moscow
46	Martin Fehérváry	D	Slovakia	HC Slovan Bratislava	Malmö Redhawks
47	Alexander Pavlenko	F	Moldova	Avtomobilist Yekaterinburg	CSKA Moscow
48	Ilya Orlov	F	Russia	Dynamo Moscow	Rus Moscow
49	Ruslan Akhmetvaliyev	F	Russia	Ak Bars Kazan	Sputnik Almetyevsk
50	Henrik Borgström	F	Finland	Salavat Yulaev Ufa	HIFK
51	Nikita Yefimov	F	Russia	SKA St. Petersburg	SKA St. Petersburg
52	Miro Heiskanen	D	Finland	Salavat Yulaev Ufa	HIF
53	Alexander Nylander	F	Sweden	Metallurg Magnitogorsk	Mississauga Steelheads
54	Saku Mäenalainen	F	Finland	Sibir Novosibirsk	Oulun Kärpät
55	Sergei Sviridov	F	Russia	HC Dynamo Moscow	Olimpiyets Balashika
56	Maxim Ryumkin	D	Russia	Avangard Omsk	Avangard Omsk
57	Dmitri Inozemtsev	F	Russia	HC Sochi	Rus Moscow
58	Seth Griffith	F	Canada	Helsingin Jokerit	Providence Bruins
59	Fyodor Mochalov	G	Russia	Lokomotiv Yaroslavl	Lokomotiv Yaroslavl
60	Lucas Wallmark	F	Sweden	HC CSKA Moscow	Luleå HF
61	Samuel Parkkari	F	Finland	Ak Bars Kazan	Tampereen Tappara
62	Matyáš Svoboda	F	Czech Republic	Ak Bars Kazan	Piráti Chomutov

=== Round 3 ===
Rank	Player	Position	Nationality	KHL team	Drafted from
63	Vladislav Utkin	D	Russia	Metallurg Novokuznetsk	HC Dmitrov
64	Makar Khabarov	D	Russia	HC CSKA Moscow	Severstal Cherepovets
65	Alexander Kovyrin	D	Russia	HC Dynamo Moscow	Dynamo Moscow
66	German Grachyov	F	Russia	Severstal Cherepovets	Severstal Cherepovets
67	Rodion Kalobanov	D	Russia	Severstal Cherepovets	Severstal Cherepovets
68	Nikita Anokhin	D	Russia	Yugra Khanty-Mansiysk	CSKA Moscow
69	Ivan Bunov	F	Russia	Spartak Moscow	Rus Moscow
70	Yegor Kruzhenkov	F	Russia	Spartak Moscow	Khimik Voskresensk
71	Nikita Azarov	D	Russia	Avtomobilist Yekaterinburg	Traktor Chelyabinsk
72	Danila Agalakov	F	Russia	Metallurg Magnitogorsk	Dynamo St. Petersburg
73	Igor Martynov	F	Belarus	Dinamo Minsk	Dinamo Raubichi
74	Aziz Seitanov	F	Russia	Barys Astana	CSKA Moscow
75	Ilnur Abdulhakov	G	Russia	Neftehimik Nizhnekamsk	Neftehimik Nizhnekamsk
76	Miloš Roman	F	Slovakia	HC Slovan Bratislava	HC Ocelaři Třinec
77	Vladislav Bukharov	F	Russia	Avtomobilist Yekaterinburg	Yunost Yekaterinburg
78	Jarno Kärki	F	Finland	Vityaz Podolsk	Porin Ässät
79	Boris Yanshin	F	Russia	HC Dynamo Moscow	Dynamo Moscow
80	Daniil Kalmykov	F	Russia	Salavat Yulaev Ufa	Belye Medvedi Moscow
81	Ivan Vasin	D	Russia	SKA St. Petersburg	Dynamo St. Petersburg
82	Alexander Oskin	F	Russia	Salavat Yulaev Ufa	CSKA Moscow
83	Lias Andersson	F	Sweden	Metallurg Magnitogorsk	HV71
84	Atte Mäkinen	D	Finland	Sibir Novosibirsk	Tampereen Tappara
85	Nikita Kulakov	D	Russia	HC Dynamo Moscow	CSKA Moscow
86	Ondřej Kaše	F	Czech Republic	Avangard Omsk	San Diego Gulls
87	Dominik Kahun	F	Germany	HC Sochi	EHC München
88	Vincent Hinostroza	F	United States	Helsingin Jokerit	Rockford IceHogs
89	Lukáš Sedlák	F	Czech Republic	Lokomotiv Yaroslavl	Lake Erie Monsters
90	Ivan Petrakov	F	Russia	HC CSKA Moscow	
91	Igor Shama	F	Russia	Avangard Omsk	Avangard Omsk

=== Round 4 ===
Rank	Player	Position	Nationality	KHL team	Drafted from
92	No pick made			Metallurg Novokuznetsk	
93	Igor Galygin	D	Russia	Salavat Yulaev Ufa	CSKA Moscow
94	Alexei Barkhatkin	H	Russia	Ak Bars Kazan	Sputnik Almetyevsk
95	Joel Eriksson Ek	F	Sweden	Sibir Novosibirsk	Färjestad BK
96	Niko Ojamäki	D	Finland	Vityaz Podolsk	Porin Ässät
97	Bogdan Denisevich	H	Russia	Yugra Khanty-Mansiysk	Olimpiyets Surgut
98	Colin Smith	F	Canada	Dinamo Riga	Toronto Marlies
99	Ivan Klepko	F	Russia	Spartak Moscow	Khimik Voskresensk
100	Zakhar Bogatyryov	D	Russia	Avtomobilist Yekaterinburg	Avangard Omsk
101	Danil Mokrushev	D	Russia	Traktor Chelyabinsk	Traktor Chelyabinsk
102	Julius Honka	D	Finland	Dinamo Minsk	Texas Stars
103	Samat Daniyar	D	Kazakhstan	Barys Astana	HC Astana
104	Daniel Kurovský	F	Czech Republic	Neftehimik Nizhnekamsk	AZ Havířov
105	Ilya Morozov	D	Russia	Sibir Novosibirsk	Sibir Novosibirsk
106	Kirill Sukhanov	D	Russia	Avtomobilist Yekaterinburg	Yunost Yekaterinburg
107	Sergei Goncharuk	F	Russia	Admiral Vladivostok	HC Dmitrov
108	Sebastian Repo	F	Finland	HC Sochi	Lahden Pelicans
109	German Poddubnyi	F	Russia	Torpedo Nizhny Novgorod	Philadelphia Jr. Flyers
110	Nikita Denisov	D	Russia	SKA St. Petersburg	Salavat Yulaev Ufa
111	Andrei Borisyuk	D	Russia	Salavat Yulaev Ufa	Rus Moscow
112	Mathias From	F	Denmark	Metallurg Magnitogorsk	Rögle BK
113	Ivan Shulga	D	Russia	Sibir Novosibirsk	Sibir Novosibirsk
114	Pavel Kulikov	G	Russia	HC Dynamo Moscow	Krylya Sovetov Moscow
115	Max Görtz	F	Sweden	Avangard Omsk	Milwaukee Admirals
116	Oskar Steen	F	Sweden	HC Sochi	Färjestad BK
117	Petteri Lindbohm	D	Finland	Helsingin Jokerit	Chicago Wolves
118	Tom Nilsson	D	Sweden	Lokomotiv Yaroslavl	Frölunda HC
119	Jesper Bratt	F	Sweden	HC CSKA Moscow	AIK IF
120	Mark Voronin	F	Russia	Avangard Omsk	Avangard Omsk

=== Round 5 ===
Rank	Player	Position	Nationality	KHL team	Drafted from
121	Kasper Kotkansalo	D	Finland	Neftehimik Nizhnekamsk	Espoo Blues
122	Ukko-Pekka Luukkonen	G	Finland	Severstal Cherepovets	HPK
123	Pavel Sakharov	D	Russia	Metallurg Magnitogorsk	Yuzhny Ural-Metallurg Orsk
124	Makar Vaulin	D	Russia	Yugra Khanty-Mansiysk	Olimpiyets Surgut
125	Juuso Riikola	D	Finland	Vityaz Podolsk	Kalpa
126	Nikita Chusovitin	F	Russia	Yugra Khanty-Mansiysk	Olimpiyets Surgut
127	Tomass Zeile	D	Latvia	Dinamo Riga	Wings HC Arlanda
128	Artyom Volkov	D	Russia	Spartak Moscow	Spartak Moscow
129	Josip Vuglac	F	Croatia	KHL Medveščak Zagreb	Medveščak Zagreb
130	Grigori Khrapsky	F	Russia	HC Dynamo Moscow	HC Dmitrov (Venäjän U17)
131	Vladislav Yeryomenko	D	Belarus	Dinamo Minsk	Dinamo Raubichi
132	Sayan Daniyar	F	Kazakhstan	Barys Astana	HC Astana
133	Alexander Kuruskin	D	Russia	Neftehimik Nizhnekamsk	Krylya Sovetov Moscow
134	Filip Krivošík	F	Slovakia	HC Slovan Bratislava	Piráti Chomutov
135	Artyom Belotsky	F	Russia	Avtomobilist Yekaterinburg	CSKA Moscow
136	Gleb Zaitsev	F	Russia	Admiral Vladivostok	Mechel Chelyabinsk
137	Anton Veselov	F	Russia	Ak Bars Kazan	Sputnik Almetyevsk
138	Andrei Volkov	F	Russia	Torpedo Nizhny Novgorod	Spartak Moscow
139	Philipp Kurashev	F	Switzerland	SKA St. Petersburg	GCK Lions
140	Jakub Sirota	D	Czech Republic	Salavat Yulaev Ufa	HC Zlin
141	Joona Koppanen	F	Finland	Metallurg Magnitogorsk	Tampereen Ilves
142	Jacob Cederholm	D	Sweden	Sibir Novosibirsk	HV71
143	Oleg Melnikov	F	Russia	HC Dynamo Moscow	CSKA Moscow
144	Yannick Rathgeb	D	Switzerland	Avangard Omsk	Fribourg-Gottéron
145	Gustav Forsling	D	Sweden	HC Sochi	Linköpings HC
146	Kalle Kossila	F	Finland	Helsingin Jokerit	San Diego Gulls
147	Filip Zadina	F	Czech Republic	Lokomotiv Yaroslavl	HC Pardubice
148	Robert Leino	F	Finland	HC CSKA Moscow	HIFK

== See also ==
- 2016–17 KHL season
- 2016 NHL entry draft
- KHL territorial pick
