= Kirill Gotovets =

Belarusian ice hockey player

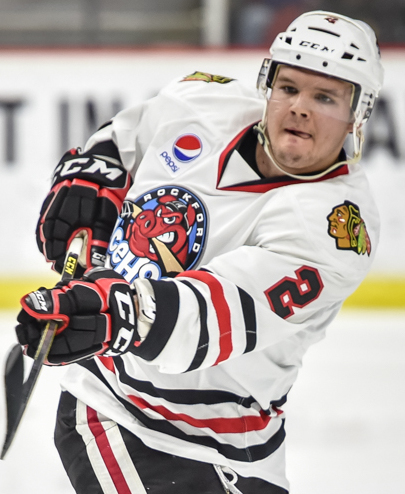
- Gotovets with the Rockford IceHogs in 2015
- Born: 25 June 1991 (age 35) Minsk, Belarusian SSR, URS
- Height: 5 ft 11 in (180 cm)
- Weight: 194 lb (88 kg; 13 st 12 lb)
- Position: Defense
- Shoots: Left
- KHL team Former teams: Free agent Milwaukee Admirals; Rockford IceHogs; Dinamo Minsk; Manitoba Moose; Avangard Omsk; Dynamo Moscow
- National team: Belarus
- NHL draft: 183rd overall, 2009; Tampa Bay Lightning
- Playing career: 2014–present

Kirill Gotovets (born 25 June 1991) is a Belarusian professional ice hockey defenseman who is currently an unrestricted free agent. He most recently played for HC Dynamo Moscow of the Kontinental Hockey League (KHL). He participated at the 2010 IIHF World Championship as a member of the Belarus National men's ice hockey team.

== Playing career ==
He played for four years at Cornell University between 2010 and 2014. He was selected by the Tampa Bay Lightning as number 183 overall, in the seventh round of the 2009 NHL entry draft.

On 2 April 2013, his NHL rights were traded to the Chicago Blackhawks in exchange for Philippe Paradis. He was also a first round selection in the 2009 KHL Junior Draft. The following year on 21 July 2014, Gotovets signed a one-year AHL contract with Blackhawks affiliate, the Rockford IceHogs.

On 12 June 2015, Gotovets was signed to another one-year AHL contract with the Rockford IceHogs for the 2015–16 season. Gotovets, who spent much of the 2014–15 season playing for the ECHL's Indy Fuel, was called up to Rockford towards the end of the regular season and saw further action in 8 Calder Cup Playoff matches, netting the game-winning goal in Game 1 of the Western Conference Quarterfinals.

After two seasons with the IceHogs, Gotovets left as a free agent to sign a one-year deal to return to Belarus with HC Dinamo Minsk of the Kontinental Hockey League on 28 July 2016. In the ensuing 2016-17 season, Gotovets added to the depth in the blueline, appearing in 24 games for 5 points.

On 10 July 2017, Gotovets opted to return to North America, agreeing to a one-year AHL contract with Canadian-based club, the Manitoba Moose, affiliate of the Winnipeg Jets. In the 2017-18 season, Gotovets secured a regular role on the blueline, appearing in 57 games and posting 13 points.

On 28 May 2018, Gotovets as a free agent opted to return to hometown club, HC Dinamo Minsk of the KHL, on a two-year contract.

After the conclusion of his contract with Dinamo, Gotovets continued in the KHL, moving to Russian club, Avangard Omsk, on a one-year contract on 12 May 2020.

Gotovets played two seasons with Avangard Omsk, claiming the Gagarin Cup in 2021, before leaving the club as a free agent and signing a two-year contract with HC Dynamo Moscow on 2 May 2022.

== International play ==
Gotovets was named to the Belarus men's national ice hockey team for competition at the 2014 IIHF World Championship.

== Career statistics ==
=== Regular season and playoffs ===
			Regular season					Playoffs
Season	Team	League	GP	G	A	Pts	PIM	GP	G	A	Pts	PIM
2007–08	Yunior Minsk	BVL	45	2	8	10	54	—	—	—	—	—
2008–09	Shattuck-Saint Mary's	USHS	54	7	25	32	70	—	—	—	—	—
2009–10	Shattuck-Saint Mary's	USHS	44	8	19	27	73	—	—	—	—	—
2010–11	Cornell University	ECAC	34	1	6	7	32	—	—	—	—	—
2011–12	Cornell University	ECAC	24	1	7	8	12	—	—	—	—	—
2012–13	Cornell University	ECAC	22	0	0	0	12	—	—	—	—	—
2013–14	Cornell University	ECAC	32	1	3	4	20	—	—	—	—	—
2013–14	Milwaukee Admirals	AHL	1	0	0	0	0	—	—	—	—	—
2014–15	Indy Fuel	ECHL	47	7	6	13	35	—	—	—	—	—
2014–15	Rockford IceHogs	AHL	12	1	1	2	8	8	1	1	2	2
2015–16	Rockford IceHogs	AHL	62	2	14	16	37	3	0	0	0	0
2016–17	Dinamo Minsk	KHL	24	1	5	6	8	5	0	0	0	2
2017–18	Manitoba Moose	AHL	44	0	3	3	18	—	—	—	—	—
2018–19	Dinamo Minsk	KHL	44	0	3	3	18	—	—	—	—	—
2019–20	Dinamo Minsk	KHL	61	1	8	9	50	—	—	—	—	—
2020–21	Avangard Omsk	KHL	45	1	1	2	12	22	3	1	4	35
2021–22	Avangard Omsk	KHL	42	0	6	6	20	5	0	1	1	0
2022–23	Dynamo Moscow	KHL	59	5	4	9	32	6	0	1	1	12
2023–24	Dynamo Moscow	KHL	48	0	5	5	23	10	0	2	2	4
2024–25	Dynamo Moscow	KHL	59	1	14	15	31	15	0	1	1	2
2025–26	Dynamo Moscow	KHL	22	0	0	0	4	—	—	—	—	—
KHL totals			404	9	46	55	198	63	3	6	9	55

=== International ===
Year	Team	Event	Result	GP	G	A	Pts	PIM
2008	Belarus	U18	9th	5	0	4	4	6
2009	Belarus	U18-D1	11th	4	1	1	2	2
2010	Belarus	WJC-D1	14th	2	0	0	0	4
2010	Belarus	WC	10th	3	0	0	0	2
2011	Belarus	WJC-D1	14th	5	1	0	1	18
2011	Belarus	WC	14th	3	0	0	0	2
2014	Belarus	WC	7th	7	0	0	0	6
2016	Belarus	WC	12th	7	1	3	4	8
2016	Belarus	OGQ	DNQ	3	0	0	0	0
Junior totals				16	2	5	7	30
Senior totals				23	1	3	4	18

== Awards and honours ==
Award	Year
KHL
Gagarin Cup (Avangard Omsk)	2021
