= 2009 KHL Junior Draft =

General information
- Date: June 1, 2009
- Location: Moscow, Russia

Overview
- League: KHL
- First selection: (Russia) Mikhail Pashnin; Selected by: CSKA Moscow

The 2009 KHL Junior Draft was the first entry draft held by the Kontinental Hockey League (KHL), taking place on June 1, 2009. Twenty-three teams would take part in the draft, selecting ice hockey players from around the world aged between 17 and 21 years of age. The draft acted as a means to disperse junior players among Russia, as well as create parity for recruiting from non-KHL affiliated hockey schools.

Although the inaugural KHL season had 24 teams, Khimik Voskrensk was forced to drop out of league activities due to financial constrains. Avtomobilist Yekaterinburg filled this vacancy, however. HC MVD did not make a single selection in the draft, refusing to use any of their draft picks.

Mikhail Pashnin, a defenceman from HC Mechel, was the first overall selection, chosen by CSKA Moscow.

== Format ==
The order of the draft was determined through an inversion of the 2009 KHL standings, with the exception of Avtomobilist, which selected last. Teams participating were able to select any player not protected by, or playing for a KHL team, aged 17–21. Rights obtained via the draft terminate when a player turns 22 years of age.

=== Eligibility ===
The following players were eligible to be drafted:

- Graduates of non-KHL affiliated hockey schools
- KHL-affiliated hockey school graduates not already on RUS-Jr rosters
- Players aged 17–21, not under contract with a KHL team.

Teams may protect up to 15 players currently in their organization from being exposed to the draft. This does not apply to players already signed to a two-way contract with a KHL team.

== Draft-day trades ==
To HC CSKA Moscow 1st-round pick in 2009 (Mikhail Pashnin)	To HC Dinamo Minsk 1st-round pick in 2009 (Kirill Gotovets); 2nd-round pick in 2009 (Mikael Granlund); 3rd-round pick in 2009 (Yuri Lavretsky)

== Selections by round ==
=== Round one ===
#	Player	Nationality	Position	KHL team	Team from	League from
1	Mikhail Pashnin	Russia	D	CSKA Moscow (from Dinamo Minsk)	HC Mechel	RUS-2
2	Mikhail Stefanovich	Belarus	RW	Dinamo Minsk (from Metallurg Nk.)	Quebec Remparts	QMJHL
3	Dmitri Shikin	Russia	G	Amur	Kristall Elektrostal	
4	Nikita Zaitsev	Russia	D	Sibir	MHC Krylya Sovetov	RUS-3
5	Passed			HC MVD		
6	Dmitri Gromov	Russia	D	Severstal Cherepovets	MHC Krylya Sovetov	RUS-3
7	Passed			Avangard Omsk		
8	Harri Säteri	Finland	G	SKA Saint Petersburg	Tappara	SM-liiga
9	Vadim Yaschuk	Russia	F	Neftekhimik	HC Belgorod	RUS-3
10	Ignat Zemchenko	Ukraine	F	Severstal Cherepovets (from Lada)	MHC Krylya Sovetov	RUS-3
11	Yevgeny Molotilov	Russia	D	Atlant Moscow (from Traktor)	Guelph Storm	OHL
12	Ramis Sadikov	Russia	G	SKA Saint Petersburg (from Torpedo)	HC Rus'	SDUShOR
13	Roberts Bukarts	Latvia	F	Dinamo Riga	PHC Krylya Sovetov	RUS-2
14	Vladimir Ruzicka	Czech Republic	F	SKA Saint Petersburg (from Spartak)	Slavia, Czech Republic	
15	Tomáš Tatar	Slovakia	F	SKA Saint Petersburg	Zvolen, Slovakia	
16	Andrey Bykov	Switzerland	F	Dynamo Moscow	Fribourg, Switzerland	
17	Alexander Savoskin	Russia	D	Metallurg Magnitogorsk	PHC Krylya Sovetov	RUS-2
18	Kirill Gotovets	Belarus	D	Dinamo Minsk (from CSKA)	Shattuck-Saint Mary's	Midget
19	Magnus Pääjärvi-Svensson	Sweden	RW	Lokomotiv Yaroslavl	Timrå IK	SEL
20	Stefan Stepanov	Russia	D	Atlant Moscow	PHC Krylya Sovetov	RUS-2
21	Alexander Shevchenko	Russia	F	Atlant Moscow (from Ak Bars)	HC Belgorod	RUS-3
22	Yevgeni Rybnitsky	Russia	D	Lada Togliatti (from Salavat Yulaev)	HC Izhstal	RUS-2
23	Ondřej Roman	Czech Republic	LW	Avtomobilist Yekaterinburg	Vitkovice, Czech Republic	

=== Round two ===
KHL All-Star·

#	Player	Nationality	Position	KHL team	Team from	League from
24	Teemu Pulkkinen	Finland	F	Dinamo Minsk	Jokerit	SM-liiga
25	Andrei Leonov	Russia	F	SKA Saint Petersburg (from Metallurg Novokuznetsk)	Kristall Elektrostal	
26	Artem Tomilin	Russia	F	Amur	PHC Krylya Sovetov	
27	Michal Řepík	Czech Republic	RW	Sibir	Rochester Americans	AHL
28	Alexander Gogolev	Russia	F	Spartak Moscow (from HC MVD)	MHC Krylya Sovetov	
29	Vitali Popov	Russia	F	Severstal Cherepovets	MHC Krylya Sovetov	
30	Roman Rukovishnikov	Russia	D	Atlant Moscow (from Avangard)	HC Rus'	SDUShOR
31	Alexander Ataev	Russia	D	Dynamo Moscow (from Barys)	PHC Krylya Sovetov	
32	Erik Karlsson	Sweden	D	Lokomotiv Yaroslavl (from Neftekhimik)	Frölunda HC	SEL
33	Yuri Sheremetiev	Russia	C	SKA Saint Petersburg (from Lada through Barys)	Halifax Mooseheads	QMJHL
34	Antonin Melka	Czech Republic	F	SKA Saint Petersburg (from Traktor)	Kladno, Czech Republic	
35	Kaspars Daugaviņš	Latvia	F	Torpedo Nizhny Novgorod	Mississauga St. Michael's Majors	OHL
36	Roberts Jekimovs	Latvia	F	Dinamo Riga	Brynäs IF	Sweden-Jr
37	Artem Voronin	Russia	F	Spartak Moscow	MHC Krylya Sovetov	
38	Passed			Metallurg Novokuznetsk (from SKA)		
39	Jyri Niemi	Finland	D	SKA Saint Petersburg (from Dynamo Moscow through Traktor)	Saskatoon Blades	WHL
40	Mattias Tedenby	Sweden	F	Atlant Moscow (from Metallurg Magnitogorsk through Avangard)	HV71	SEL
41	Mikael Granlund	Finland	F	Dinamo Minsk (from CSKA)	Kärpät	SM-liiga
42	Jaroslav Janus	Slovakia	G	Lokomotiv Yaroslavl	Erie Otters	OHL
43	Jiří Tlustý	Czech Republic	LW	Atlant Moscow	Toronto Maple Leafs	NHL
44	Passed			Ak Bars Kazan		
45	Mikhail Grigoriev	Russia	D	Salavat Yulaev Ufa	Yuzhny Ural	
46	Alexei Filippov	Russia	F	Avtomobilist Yekaterinburg	MHC Krylya Sovetov	

=== Round three ===
#	Player	Nationality	Position	KHL team	Team from	League from
47	Petr Eremin	Russia	G	Atlant Moscow	Kristall Elektrostal	
48	Artem Demkov	Belarus	C	Dinamo Minsk	Cape Breton Screaming Eagles	QMJHL
49	Georgi Dulnev	Russia	D	Metallurg Novokuznetsk	Kristall Elektrostal	
50	Sergei Chistyakov	Russia	F	Spartak Moscow (from Amur Khabarovsk)	Kristall Elektrostal	
51	Simon Hjalmarsson	Sweden	F	Sibir	Borås HC	HockeyAllsvenskan
52	Passed			HC MVD		
53	Kirill Sviyzaov	Russia	D	Severstal Cherepovets	MHC Krylya Sovetov	RUS-3
54	Artem Venskel	Russia	D	Atlant Moscow (from Avangard Omsk)	Vityaz Chekhov	
55	Boris Novikov	Russia	D	Neftekhimik	MHC Krylya Sovetov	RUS-3
56	Zack Kassian	Canada	RW	Dynamo Moscow (from Neftekhimik Nizhnekamsk)	Peterborough Petes	OHL
57	Egor Antropov	Russia	D	Atlant Moscow (from Traktor)	Belye Medvedi	
58	David Kveton	Czech Republic	F	Atlant Moscow (from Torpedo Nizhny Novgorod via Avangard Omsk)	HC Oceláři Třinec	Czech Extraliga
59	Ainārs Podziņš	Latvia	F	Dinamo Riga	PHC Krylya Sovetov	RUS-2
60	Juraj Mikúš	Slovakia	F	Spartak Moscow	HK 36 Skalica	Slovak Extraliga
61	Jacob Josefson	Sweden	F	SKA Saint Petersburg	Djurgårdens IF	Elitserien
62	Erik Gudbranson	Canada	D	Dynamo Moscow	Kingston Frontenacs	OHL
63	Marat Zaripov	Russia	F	Metallurg Magnitogorsk	HC Mechel	RUS-2
64	Yuri Lavretsky	Russia	G	Dinamo Minsk (from CSKA)	Kapitan Stupino	RUS-2
65	Nikolai Suslo	Belarus	F	Lokomotiv Yaroslavl	HK Gomel	Ekstraliga
66	Jhonas Enroth	Sweden	G	Atlant Moscow	Portland Pirates	AHL
67	Oleg Li	Russia	F	Atlant Moscow (from Ak Bars)	Quebec Remparts	QMJHL
68	Ilya Ivanovsky	Russia	F	Salavat Yulaev Ufa	Vityaz Chekhov	
69	Richard Pánik	Slovakia	RW	Avtomobilist Yekaterinburg	HC Oceláři Třinec	Czech Extraliga

=== Round four ===
#	Player	Nationality	Position	KHL team	Team from	League from
70	Sergei Sheleg	Belarus	D	Dinamo Minsk	Sudbury Wolves	OHL
71	Maksim Matushkin	Sweden	D	Mettalurg Novokuznetsk	IF Björklöven	HockeyAllsvenskan
72	Passed			Lada Togliatti (from Amur Khabarovsk)		
73	Kristofer Berglund	Sweden	D	Sibir	Luleå HF	Elitserien
74	Alexander Fedoseyev	Russia	F	CSKA Moscow (from HC MVD)	MHC Krylya Sovetov	RUS-3
75	Artur Ganzvind	Russia	F	Severstal Cherepovets	MHC Krylya Sovetov	RUS-3
76	Alexander Toropov	Russia	D	Avangard Omsk	Avangard Jr. Omsk	
77	Kirill Alenikov	Russia	D	Barys Astana	Metallurg Magnitogorsk	
78	Miro Hovinen	Finland	D	Dynamo Moscow (from Neftekhimik Nizhnekamsk)	Jokerit	SM-liiga
79	Sergei Ryabukin	Russia	F	Lada Togliatti	CSK VVS Samara	RUS-2
80	Michal Jordan	Czech Republic	D	SKA Saint Petersburg (from Traktor)	Plymouth Whalers	OHL
81	Alexander Frolenkov	Russia	D	Torpedo Nizhny Novgorod	Moscow White Bears	
82	Andris Džeriņš	Latvia	C	Dinamo Riga	Kingston Frontenacs	OHL
83	Victor Hedman	Sweden	D	Spartak Moscow	Modo Hockey	Elitserien
84	Pavel Bondarevski	Russia	F	Neftekhimik Nizhnekamsk (from Dinamo Moscow)		
85	Oliver Ekman-Larsson	Sweden	D	Metallurg Magnitogorsk	Leksands IF	HockeyAllsvenskan
86	Simon Bertilsson	Sweden	D	Metallurg Magnitogorsk (from CSKA Moscow)	Brynäs IF	Elitserien
87	Toni Rajala	Finland	RW	Lokomotiv Yaroslavl	Ilves Tampere	SM-liiga
88	Dmytro Shvidenko	Ukraine	D	Atlant Moscow	Spartak Moscow	
89	Taylor Hall	Canada	LW	Ak Bars Kazan	Windsor Spitfires	OHL
90	Egor Martinov	Russia	D	Salavat Yulaev Ufa	HC Mechel	RUS-2
91	Kirill Badulin	Russia	D	Avtomobilist Yekaterinburg	HC Mechel	RUS-2

== See also ==
- 2009–10 KHL season
- 2009 NHL entry draft
