= Evgeny Rybnitsky =

Russian ice hockey player

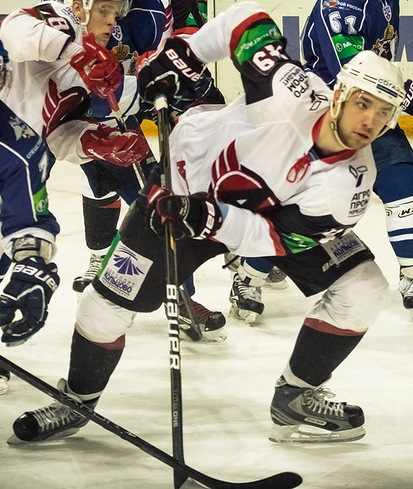
- Born: July 8, 1989 (age 37) Chelyabinsk, Russian SFSR
- Height: 6 ft 3 in (191 cm)
- Weight: 190 lb (86 kg; 13 st 8 lb)
- Position: Defence
- Shot: Left
- Played for: Izhstal Izhevsk; Dizel Penza; Neftekhimik Nizhnekamsk; Avtomobilist Yekaterinburg; Amur Khabarovsk; Buran Voronezh; Rubin Tyumen; ORG Beijing; Rulav Oddr/HC Kharkiv Berserkers
- Playing career: 2006–2022

Evgeny Rybnitsky (born July 8, 1989) is a Russian ice hockey defenceman. He is currently playing with ORG Beijing of the Supreme Hockey League (VHL). He was a first round selection in the 2009 KHL Junior Draft.

Rybnitsky made his Kontinental Hockey League (KHL) debut playing with HC Neftekhimik Nizhnekamsk during the 2011–12 KHL season.

== Career statistics ==
			Regular season					Playoffs
Season	Team	League	GP	G	A	Pts	PIM	GP	G	A	Pts	PIM
2005–06	Vityaz Chekhov-2	Russia3	1	0	1	1	0	—	—	—	—	—
2005–06	SDYUSHOR Vityaz Chekhov	MosJHL	10	0	1	1	28	—	—	—	—	—
2006–07	Vityaz Chekhov-2	Russia3	58	2	6	8	213	—	—	—	—	—
2006–07	SDYUSHOR Vityaz Chekhov	MosJHL	6	2	0	2	71	—	—	—	—	—
2007–08	Vityaz Chekhov-2	Russia3	25	0	3	3	132	—	—	—	—	—
2007–08	SDYUSHOR Vityaz Podolsk	MosJHL	2	1	1	2	35	—	—	—	—	—
2008–09	Izhstal Izhevsk	Russia2	50	0	4	4	58	9	0	0	0	10
2008–09	Izhstal Izhevsk-2	Russia3	2	0	0	0	4	—	—	—	—	—
2009–10	Dizel Penza	Russia2	49	5	2	7	68	5	0	0	0	0
2010–11	Dizel Penza	VHL	51	2	9	11	78	13	0	1	1	35
2011–12	HC Neftekhimik Nizhnekamsk	KHL	30	0	2	2	30	—	—	—	—	—
2012–13	HC Neftekhimik Nizhnekamsk	KHL	6	0	1	1	0	—	—	—	—	—
2012–13	Dizel Penza	VHL	3	0	0	0	8	—	—	—	—	—
2012–13	Izhstal Izhevsk	VHL	3	1	0	1	14	—	—	—	—	—
2012–13	Avtomobilist Yekaterinburg	KHL	17	0	3	3	24	—	—	—	—	—
2013–14	Avtomobilist Yekaterinburg	KHL	31	0	0	0	17	1	0	0	0	0
2014–15	Amur Khabarovsk	KHL	9	0	0	0	0	—	—	—	—	—
2014–15	Dizel Penza	VHL	11	0	1	1	18	—	—	—	—	—
2015–16	Buran Voronezh	VHL	35	0	10	10	38	7	0	1	1	2
2016–17	Rubin Tyumen	VHL	46	4	10	14	54	15	1	4	5	38
2017–18	KRS Heilongjiang	VHL	39	4	15	19	61	—	—	—	—	—
2018–19	KRS-ORG Beijing	VHL	48	1	7	8	95	—	—	—	—	—
2019–20	ORG Beijing	VHL	49	8	15	23	59	—	—	—	—	—
2021–22	Rulav Oddr/HC Kharkiv Berserkers	Ukraine	9	1	3	4	8	—	—	—	—	—
2021–22	Rulav Oddr/HC Kharkiv Berserkers	Ukraine	4	1	0	1	6	—	—	—	—	—
KHL totals			93	0	6	6	71	1	0	0	0	0
VHL totals			285	20	67	87	425	35	1	6	7	75
Russia2 totals			99	5	6	11	126	14	0	0	0	10
