= Ogurenkov =

Ogurenkov (Russian: Огуре́нков; masculine) or Ogurenkova (Огуре́нкова; feminine) is a Russian last name, a variant of Agureyev.

People with the last name

- Yevgeny Ogurenkov, Soviet boxer who lost to Nikolay Korolyov in 1944
