= Dmitri Gromov (ice hockey) =

Russian ice hockey player

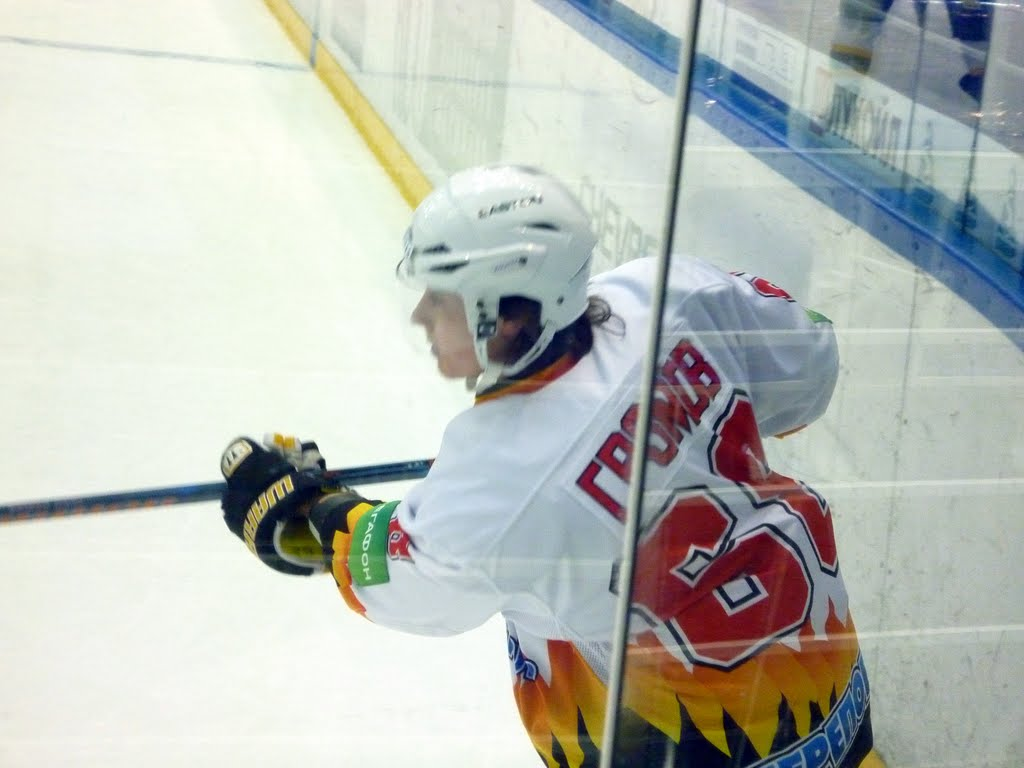
- Born: July 2, 1991 (age 35) Moscow, Russian SFSR, Soviet Union
- Height: 5 ft 8 in (173 cm)
- Weight: 148 lb (67 kg; 10 st 8 lb)
- Position: Defence
- Shoots: Left
- VHL team Former teams: Torpedo Ust-Kamenogorsk; Severstal Cherepovets
- Playing career: 2009–present

Dmitri Andreevich Gromov (Russian: Дмитрий Андреевич Громов; born July 2, 1991) is a Russian professional ice hockey defenceman who plays for the Torpedo Ust-Kamenogorsk of the Supreme Hockey League. (VHL)

Gromov was selected 6th overall in the 2009 KHL Junior Draft by Severstal Cherepovets but only managed to play just three games in the Kontinental Hockey League for the team.

== Career statistics ==
=== Regular season and playoffs ===
			Regular season					Playoffs
Season	Team	League	GP	G	A	Pts	PIM	GP	G	A	Pts	PIM
2008–09	MHC Krylya Sovetov	RUS 2	—	—	—	—	—	12	0	0	0	0
2009–10	Severstal Cherepovets	KHL	2	0	0	0	0	—	—	—	—	—
2010–11	Severstal Cherepovets	KHL	1	0	0	0	2	—	—	—	—	—
KHL totals			3	0	0	0	2	—	—	—	—	—
