= Agureyev =

Agureyev (Russian: Агуре́ев; masculine) or Agureyeva (Агуре́ева; feminine) is a Russian last name. Variants of this last name include Agureykin/Agureykina (Агуре́йкин/Агуре́йкина), Ogureyev/Ogureyeva (Огуре́ев/Огуре́ева), Ogurenkov/Ogurenkova (Огуре́нков/Огуре́нкова), Oguryayev/Oguryayeva (Огуря́ев/Огуря́ева), and possibly Ogurtsov/Ogurtsova (Огурцо́в/Огурцо́ва).

There are three theories as to the origins of these last names. According to the first one, they derive from the Russian dialectal verb "огуреть" (oguret)—or "агуреть" (aguret) in dialects with akanye—meaning to disobey. This and related dialectal words "огурь" (ogur), meaning stubbornness, laziness; "огурный" (ogurny), meaning a stubborn idler, a slacker; and "огуряться" (oguryatsya), meaning to slack off, gave birth to nicknames "Огурей" (Ogurey) and "Огуряй" (Oguryay), as well as "Агурей" (Agurey) and "Агурейка" (Agureyka) in dialects with akanye.

According to another theory, this last name derives from the first name Gury, a form of which is "Gurey". The latter eventually transformed to "Agureyev"/"Ogureyev", as adding a vowel made pronunciation easier.

Finally, it is also possible that these last names (and especially "Ogurtsov") derive from the nickname "Огурец" (Ogurets), which in some dialects has the same meaning as "Ogurey" and its variants above, but also literally means cucumber. The latter possibility, however, is discounted by some researchers.

== People ==
- Polina Agureyeva, Russian actress starring in Euphoria, a 2006 drama/romance movie, and Liquidation, a 2007 miniseries
