= Ogurtsovo =

Ogurtsovo (Russian: Огурцово) is the name of several rural localities in Russia:

- Ogurtsovo, Opochetsky District, Pskov Oblast, a village in Opochetsky District of Pskov Oblast
- Ogurtsovo, Ostrovsky District, Pskov Oblast, a village in Ostrovsky District of Pskov Oblast
- Ogurtsovo, Tver Oblast, a village in Staromelkovskoye Rural Settlement of Konakovsky District in Tver Oblast
