= Anton Slepyshev =

Russian ice hockey player (born 1994)

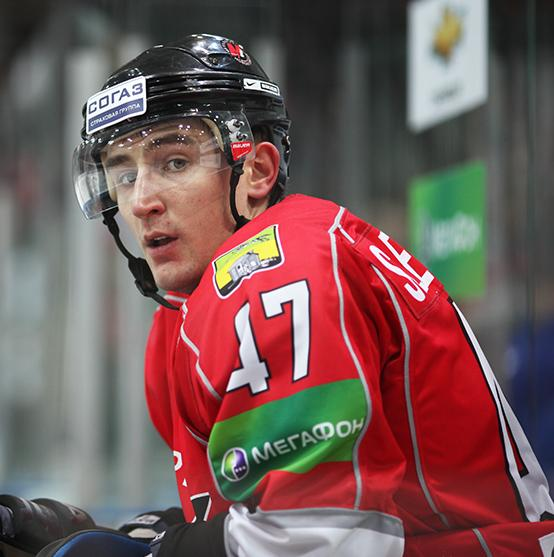
- Slepyshev with Metallurg Novokuznetsk in 2012
- Born: 13 May 1994 (age 32) Penza, Russia
- Height: 6 ft 2 in (188 cm)
- Weight: 187 lb (85 kg; 13 st 5 lb)
- Position: Left wing
- Shoots: Right
- KHL team Former teams: Avtomobilist Yekaterinburg; Metallurg Novokuznetsk; Salavat Yulaev Ufa; Edmonton Oilers; CSKA Moscow; Dynamo Moscow
- National team: Russia
- NHL draft: 88th overall, 2013; Edmonton Oilers
- Playing career: 2011–present

Anton Vladimirovich Slepyshev (Russian: Антон Владимирович Слепышев born 13 May 1994) is a Russian professional ice hockey forward for Avtomobilist Yekaterinburg of the Kontinental Hockey League (KHL). He previously played for the Edmonton Oilers of the National Hockey League (NHL).

== Playing career ==
Slepyshev was selected first overall in the 2011 KHL Junior Draft by Metallurg Novokuznetsk. Midway through the 2012–13 season, his second in the Kontinental Hockey League, he moved from Metallurg to Salavat Yulaev Ufa. After the Oilers selected him in the third round (88th overall) of the 2013 NHL entry draft, Slepyshev remained in Russia to continue his development with Salavat.

On 27 May 2015, the Oilers announced they had signed Slepyshev to a three-year entry-level contract.

After his entry-level contract with the Oilers following the 2017–18 season, Slepyshev was tendered a qualifying offer to retain his rights. As a restricted free agent, Slepyshev opted not to sign with the Oilers, opting to return to Russia and sign a two-year contract with the premier club, CSKA Moscow of the KHL on July 2, 2018.

Following his sixth season with CSKA in 2023–24, having claimed three Gagarin Cup championships during his tenure, Slepyshev was traded by the club to HC Dynamo Moscow in exchange for prospect Ivan Patrikhayev on 23 May 2024.

In October 2024, Slepyshev suspended his contract with Dynamo due to family circumstances. He later returned to the club for the 2025–26 season.

After two seasons with Dynamo, Slepyshev left Moscow as a free agent and was signed to a one-year contract with Avtomobilist Yekaterinburg on 3 June 2026.

== International play ==
Medal record

Ice hockey

Representing ROC

Olympic Games
| Silver medal – second place | 2022 Beijing | |

Representing Russia

World Junior Championships
| Bronze medal – third place | 2013 Ufa | |
| Bronze medal – third place | 2014 Malmo | |

World U18 Championships
| Bronze medal – third place | 2011 Germany | |

On 23 January 2022, Slepyshev was named to the roster to represent Russian Olympic Committee athletes at the 2022 Winter Olympics.

== Career statistics ==
=== Regular season and playoffs ===
| | | | Regular season | | | | | Playoffs |
| Season | Team | League | GP | G | A | Pts | PIM | GP | G | A | Pts | PIM |
|---|---|---|---|---|---|---|---|---|---|---|---|---|
| 2009–10 | Dizel–2 Penza | RUS.3 | 39 | 12 | 9 | 21 | 10 | 4 | 1 | 1 | 2 | 4 |
| 2010–11 | Dizel–2 Penza | RUS.3 | 20 | 8 | 4 | 12 | 10 | — | — | — | — | — |
| 2011–12 | Kuznetskie Medvedi | MHL | 13 | 7 | 2 | 9 | 6 | 3 | 1 | 0 | 1 | 0 |
| 2011–12 | Metallurg Novokuznetsk | KHL | 39 | 4 | 3 | 7 | 2 | — | — | — | — | — |
| 2012–13 | Metallurg Novokuznetsk | KHL | 15 | 3 | 0 | 3 | 12 | — | — | — | — | — |
| 2012–13 | Salavat Yulaev Ufa | KHL | 11 | 4 | 2 | 6 | 2 | 14 | 0 | 0 | 0 | 0 |
| 2012–13 | Tolpar Ufa | MHL | — | — | — | — | — | 3 | 1 | 0 | 1 | 12 |
| 2013–14 | Salavat Yulaev Ufa | KHL | 36 | 3 | 5 | 8 | 4 | 18 | 2 | 1 | 3 | 6 |
| 2013–14 | Tolpar Ufa | MHL | 2 | 2 | 2 | 4 | 0 | — | — | — | — | — |
| 2014–15 | Salavat Yulaev Ufa | KHL | 58 | 15 | 10 | 25 | 12 | 5 | 0 | 2 | 2 | 0 |
| 2014–15 | Tolpar Ufa | MHL | — | — | — | — | — | 4 | 5 | 3 | 8 | 0 |
| 2015–16 | Edmonton Oilers | NHL | 11 | 0 | 1 | 1 | 2 | — | — | — | — | — |
| 2015–16 | Bakersfield Condors | AHL | 49 | 13 | 8 | 21 | 28 | — | — | — | — | — |
| 2016–17 | Edmonton Oilers | NHL | 41 | 4 | 6 | 10 | 4 | 12 | 3 | 0 | 3 | 4 |
| 2016–17 | Bakersfield Condors | AHL | 9 | 3 | 7 | 10 | 6 | — | — | — | — | — |
| 2017–18 | Bakersfield Condors | AHL | 1 | 0 | 0 | 0 | 2 | — | — | — | — | — |
| 2017–18 | Edmonton Oilers | NHL | 50 | 6 | 6 | 12 | 8 | — | — | — | — | — |
| 2018–19 | CSKA Moscow | KHL | 56 | 15 | 10 | 25 | 20 | 17 | 3 | 2 | 5 | 29 |
| 2019–20 | CSKA Moscow | KHL | 54 | 18 | 27 | 45 | 43 | 4 | 2 | 3 | 5 | 0 |
| 2020–21 | CSKA Moscow | KHL | 35 | 12 | 14 | 26 | 4 | 23 | 6 | 5 | 11 | 16 |
| 2021–22 | CSKA Moscow | KHL | 35 | 10 | 15 | 25 | 23 | 22 | 4 | 6 | 10 | 12 |
| 2022–23 | CSKA Moscow | KHL | 50 | 10 | 17 | 27 | 16 | 27 | 8 | 8 | 16 | 10 |
| 2023–24 | CSKA Moscow | KHL | 43 | 10 | 15 | 25 | 16 | 5 | 1 | 1 | 2 | 0 |
| 2024–25 | Dynamo Moscow | KHL | 19 | 3 | 2 | 5 | 4 | 10 | 2 | 0 | 2 | 0 |
| 2025–26 | Dynamo Moscow | KHL | 62 | 9 | 18 | 27 | 14 | 4 | 0 | 0 | 0 | 0 |
| KHL totals | | | 513 | 116 | 138 | 254 | 162 | 149 | 28 | 28 | 56 | 73 |
| NHL totals | | | 102 | 10 | 13 | 23 | 14 | 12 | 3 | 0 | 3 | 4 |

=== International ===
| Year | Team | Event | Result | GP | G | A | Pts | PIM |
|---|---|---|---|---|---|---|---|---|
| 2011 | Russia | WJC18 | 3rd place, bronze medalist(s) | 7 | 3 | 1 | 4 | 0 |
| 2012 | Russia | WJC18 | 5th | 6 | 3 | 4 | 7 | 6 |
| 2013 | Russia | WJC | 3rd place, bronze medalist(s) | 7 | 0 | 1 | 1 | 4 |
| 2014 | Russia | WJC | 3rd place, bronze medalist(s) | 7 | 2 | 5 | 7 | 0 |
| 2021 | ROC | WC | 5th | 8 | 2 | 4 | 6 | 2 |
| 2022 | ROC | OG | 2nd place, silver medalist(s) | 6 | 2 | 1 | 3 | 4 |
| Junior totals | | | | 27 | 8 | 11 | 19 | 10 |
| Senior totals | | | | 14 | 4 | 5 | 9 | 6 |

== Awards and honors ==
| Award | Year |
|---|---|
KHL
| Gagarin Cup (CSKA Moscow) | 2019, 2022, 2023 |

== See also ==
- List of first overall KHL draft picks
