= Dmitrij Jaškin =

Czech ice hockey player (born 1993)

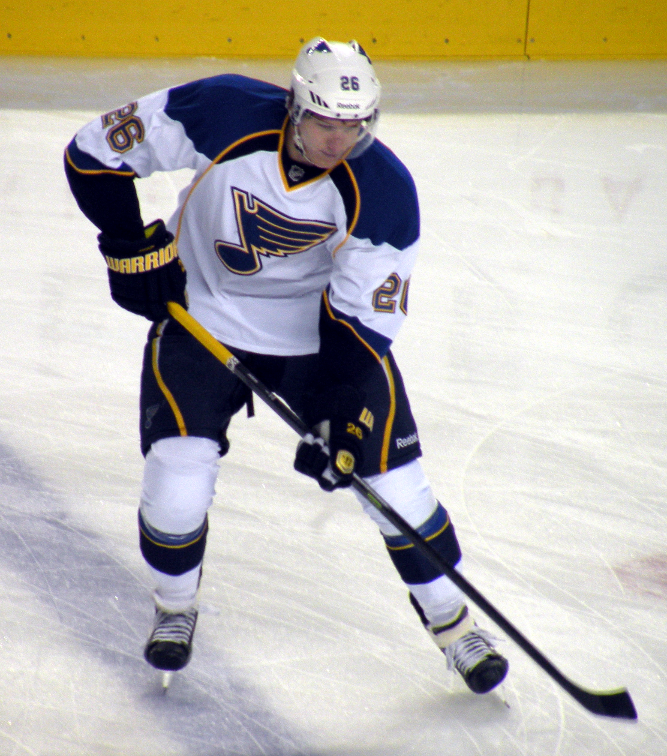
- Jaškin with the St. Louis Blues in 2013
- Born: 23 March 1993 (age 33) Omsk, Russia
- Height: 6 ft 2 in (188 cm)
- Weight: 196 lb (89 kg; 14 st 0 lb)
- Position: Right wing
- Shoots: Left
- KHL team Former teams: Shanghai Dragons; Slavia Praha; St. Louis Blues; Washington Capitals; Dynamo Moscow; Arizona Coyotes; SKA Saint Petersburg; Ak Bars Kazan
- National team: Czech Republic
- NHL draft: 41st overall, 2011; St. Louis Blues
- Playing career: 2010–present

Dmitrij Alexejevič Jaškin (Russian: Дмитрий Алексеевич Яшкин; born 23 March 1993) is a Russian-born Czech professional ice hockey player currently playing with the Shanghai Dragons of the Kontinental Hockey League (KHL). He played five seasons for the St Louis Blues and one season with the Washington Capitals and Arizona Coyotes of the National Hockey League (NHL). Jaškin was selected first overall in the 2010 KHL Junior Draft by Sibir Novosibirsk, and was drafted by the Blues in the second round, 41st overall, in the 2011 NHL entry draft.

== Early life ==
His father, Alexej Jaškin, was a professional defenceman for Khimik Voskresensk in the Soviet Championship League and later Vsetín in the Czech Extraliga. Dmitrij and his older brother Michail started in the Vsetín youth system while their father played there, and they both transferred to Slavia Praha in 2008. The family has lived in the Czech Republic since 1993, when Dmitrij was eight months old.

== Playing career ==
He first played professionally for Slavia Praha of the Czech Extraliga for two seasons. Jaškin could have played in the 2011 IIHF World U20 Championship, but suffered a knee injury in an Extraliga game on 21 November, which sidelined him for six weeks and caused him to miss the tournament. He registered 10 points in 33 Extraliga games during the season as a 17-year-old, ranking him second among junior-aged players in the league.

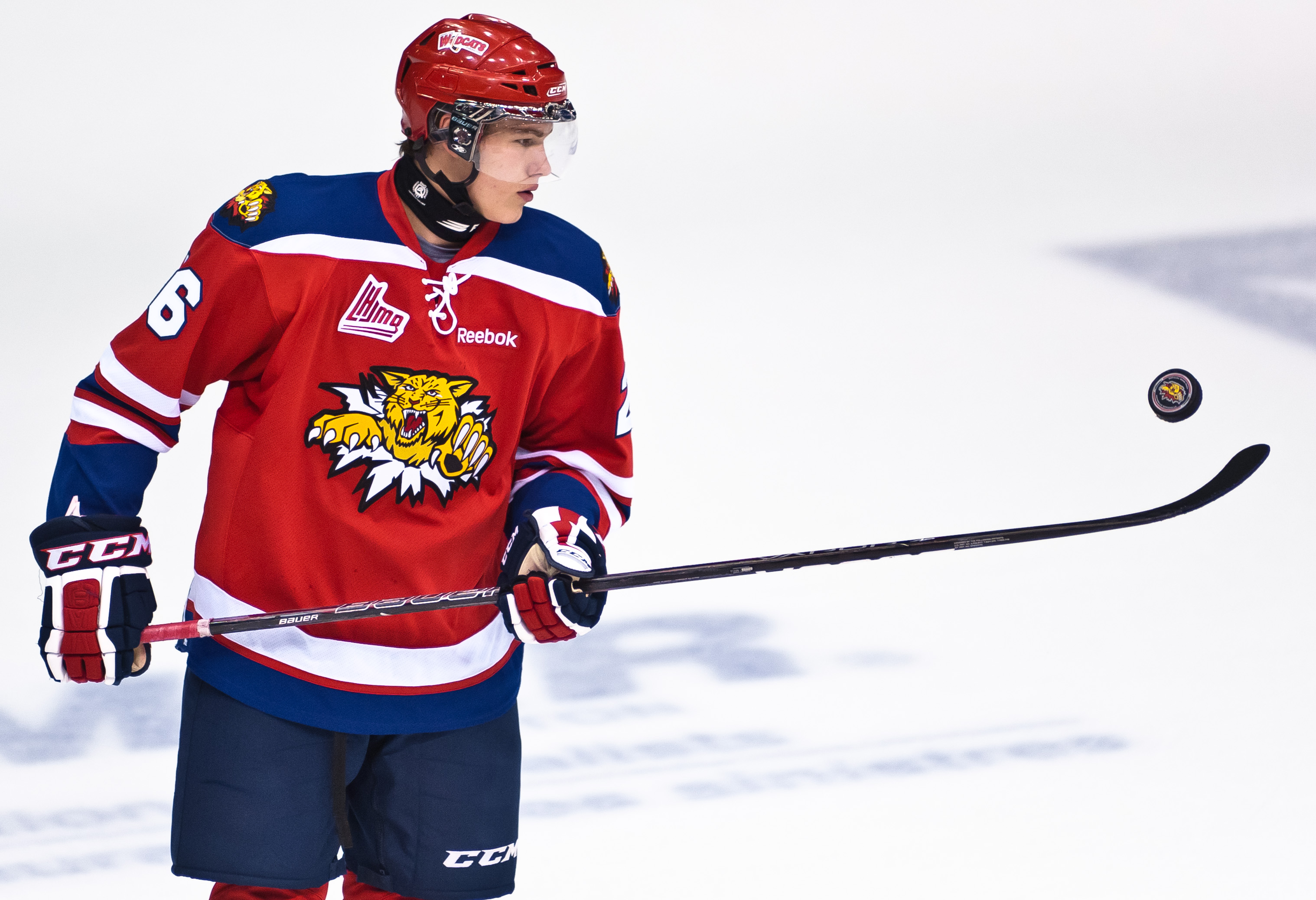
Jaškin as a member of the Moncton Wildcats

After being selected by the Moncton Wildcats in the 2012 CHL Import Draft, Jaškin announced that he would play for the QMJHL team in the 2012–13 season in order to increase his chances of playing in the NHL.

On 3 April 2013, he signed a three-year, entry-level contract with the St. Louis Blues, and was assigned to the Chicago Wolves. He was recalled to the Blues roster on 9 April.

During the 2013–14 season, on 28 December 2013, he scored his first NHL goal against Antti Raanta of the Chicago Blackhawks. On 3 July 2015, the Blues re-signed him to a one-year deal. Following 2015–16 season, on 16 June 2016, Jaškin re-signed with the Blues to a two-year, $2 million deal.

On 2 October 2018, Jaškin was claimed off waivers by the Washington Capitals.

Jaškin as a free agent from the Capitals, opted to pause his NHL career and returned to Russia in signing a one-year deal with HC Dynamo Moscow of the KHL on 22 August 2019. Making his KHL debut in the 2019–20 season and benefiting from an increased role with Dynamo, Jaškin was leaned on offensively recording 63 points in 58 regular season games. His 31 goals set a new franchise single KHL season record and he was signed to an improved two-year contract extension on 17 April 2020.

After two highly productive seasons with HC Dynamo Moscow, Jaškin returned to North America as a free agent, agreeing to a lucrative one-year, $3.2 million contract with the Arizona Coyotes on July 28, 2021. Jaškin continued to struggle to make an impact at the NHL level with a poorly performing Coyotes team. Through his first 12 games, he registered a single assist before suffering an injury in a game against the Nashville Predators on November 13. Following an illegal hit by Predators defenseman Mark Borowiecki, he was expected to be out of action long-term and was placed on the injured reserve. Ultimately Jaškin did not appear in another game with the Coyotes.

As a free agent, Jaškin returned to the KHL and was signed to a one-year contract after his rights were traded from Dynamo Moscow to SKA Saint Petersburg on 25 July 2022. Named as team captain for the 2022–23 season, Jaškin returned to his previous goal scoring form, leading the league with 40 goals and in points across the regular and post-season.

On 7 June 2023, Jaškin as the top tier free agent of the league was signed to a three-year contract with SKA competitor club, Ak Bars Kazan.

Having concluded his tenure with Ak Bars with an appearance in the Gagarin Cup finals, Jaškin left the club and continued his tenure in the KHL with Chinese club, Shanghai Dragons, on 17 July 2026.

== Career statistics ==
=== Regular season and playoffs ===
			Regular season					Playoffs
Season	Team	League	GP	G	A	Pts	PIM	GP	G	A	Pts	PIM
2007–08	Vsetínská hokejová	CZE U18	40	15	25	40	72	2	2	0	2	6
2008–09	HC Slavia Praha	CZE U18	46	28	19	47	34	9	6	2	8	8
2009–10	HC Slavia Praha	CZE U18	12	15	12	27	36	2	1	3	4	4
2009–10	HC Slavia Praha	CZE U20	40	13	10	23	67	7	2	5	7	26
2010–11	HC Slavia Praha	CZE U20	1	0	0	0	0	2	2	3	5	2
2010–11	HC Slavia Praha	ELH	33	3	7	10	16	17	2	1	3	31
2011–12	HC Slavia Praha	CZE U20	10	6	11	17	12	2	1	3	4	14
2011–12	HC Slavia Praha	ELH	30	1	1	2	16	—	—	—	—	—
2011–12	HC Berounští Medvědi	Czech.1	10	2	6	8	16	—	—	—	—	—
2012–13	Moncton Wildcats	QMJHL	51	46	53	99	73	5	1	2	3	16
2012–13	St. Louis Blues	NHL	2	0	0	0	0	—	—	—	—	—
2013–14	Chicago Wolves	AHL	42	15	14	29	28	9	4	5	9	10
2013–14	St. Louis Blues	NHL	18	1	1	2	8	—	—	—	—	—
2014–15	St. Louis Blues	NHL	54	13	5	18	16	6	0	1	1	2
2015–16	St. Louis Blues	NHL	65	4	9	13	26	6	1	1	2	5
2015–16	Chicago Wolves	AHL	3	1	1	2	4	—	—	—	—	—
2016–17	St. Louis Blues	NHL	51	1	10	11	18	2	1	0	1	4
2017–18	St. Louis Blues	NHL	76	6	11	17	14	—	—	—	—	—
2018–19	Washington Capitals	NHL	37	2	6	8	6	—	—	—	—	—
2019–20	Dynamo Moscow	KHL	58	31	32	63	75	6	3	3	6	6
2020–21	Dynamo Moscow	KHL	59	38	22	60	52	10	5	3	8	12
2021–22	Arizona Coyotes	NHL	12	0	1	1	4	—	—	—	—	—
2022–23	SKA Saint Petersburg	KHL	67	40	22	62	48	14	5	2	7	16
2023–24	Ak Bars Kazan	KHL	36	18	6	24	28	4	1	1	2	4
2024–25	Ak Bars Kazan	KHL	68	35	19	54	44	13	6	5	11	10
2025–26	Ak Bars Kazan	KHL	59	18	14	32	32	20	7	3	10	20
NHL totals			315	27	43	70	92	14	2	2	4	11
KHL totals			347	180	115	295	279	67	27	17	44	68

=== International ===
Year	Team	Event	Result	GP	G	A	Pts	PIM
2010	Czech Republic	IH18	4th	5	3	4	7	0
2011	Czech Republic	U18	8th	6	4	1	5	10
2012	Czech Republic	WJC	5th	6	1	1	2	4
2013	Czech Republic	WJC	5th	6	3	3	6	12
2016	Czech Republic	WCH	6th	3	0	0	0	0
2018	Czech Republic	WC	7th	8	4	3	7	10
2019	Czech Republic	WC	4th	10	2	2	4	14
Junior totals				18	8	5	13	26
Senior totals				21	6	5	11	24

== See also ==
- List of first overall KHL draft picks
