= Soviet Wings Sport Palace =

Indoor sports venue in Moscow, Russia

Coordinates: 55°43′13″N 37°24′21″E

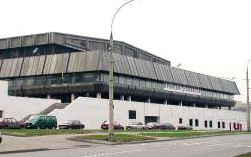
Soviet Wings Universal Sport Palace

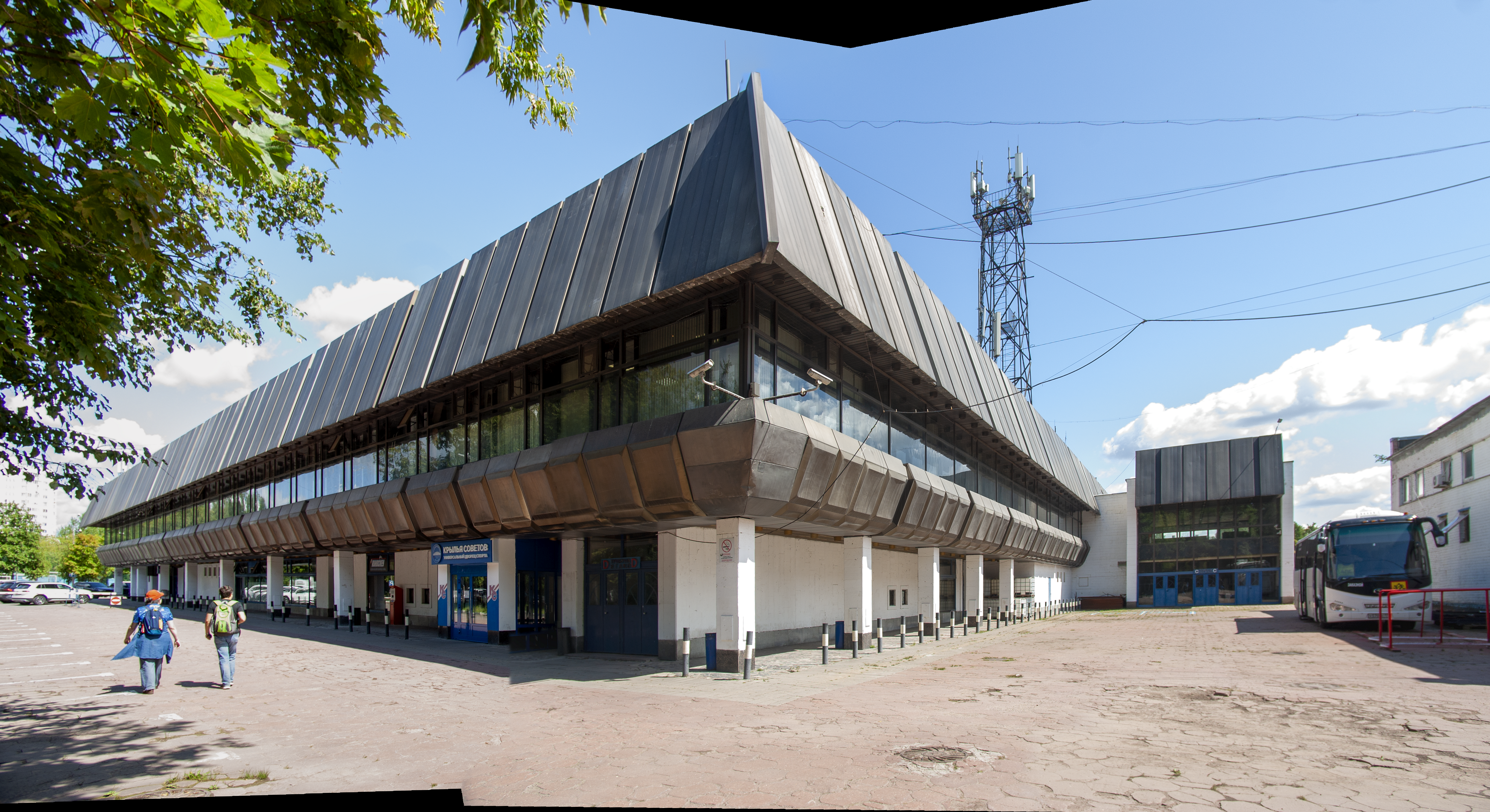
Main entrance of building

Soviet Wings Universal Sport Palace (Russian: Универсальный дворец спорта «Крылья Советов») is an indoor sporting arena located in Moscow, Russia. The capacity of the arena is 5,670, it was opened on December 2, 1980. It is the home arena of the MHC Krylya Sovetov ice hockey team.
