= Huovinen =

Huovinen is a Finnish surname. Notable people with the surname include:

- Eero Huovinen (born 1944), Finnish Lutheran bishop
- Susanna Huovinen (born 1972), Finnish politician
- Veikko Huovinen (1927–2009), Finnish novelist and forester
