= Alexander Shevchenko (ice hockey) =

Russian ice hockey player

- Born: August 20, 1992 (age 33); Belgorod, Russia
- Height: 6 ft 0 in (183 cm)
- Weight: 181 lb (82 kg; 12 st 13 lb)
- Position: Forward
- Shoots: Right
- KHL team Former teams: Free agent Atlant Moscow Oblast; HC Sochi; HC Yugra; HC Vityaz; Admiral Vladivostok
- NHL draft: Undrafted
- Playing career: 2010–present

Alexander Shevchenko (Russian: Александр Шевченко; born August 20, 1992) is a Russian professional ice hockey player. He is currently an unrestricted free agent who most recently played with Admiral Vladivostok of the Kontinental Hockey League (KHL).

Shevchenko made his Kontinental Hockey League (KHL) debut playing with Atlant Moscow Oblast during the 2012–13 KHL season.
