= Egor Antropov =

Russian ice hockey player (born 1992)

- Born: May 8, 1992 (age 33) Moscow, Russia
- Height: 6 ft 0 in (183 cm)
- Weight: 198 lb (90 kg; 14 st 2 lb)
- Position: Defence
- Shoots: Right
- ELH team Former teams: Piráti Chomutov; Admiral Vladivostok; Neftekhimik Nizhnekamsk; Severstal Cherepovets; Vityaz Podolsk
- NHL draft: Undrafted
- Playing career: 2012–present

Egor Antropov (born May 8, 1992) is a Russian professional ice hockey defenceman. He is currently playing with Piráti Chomutov of the Czech Extraliga (ELH).

== Playing career ==
Antropov made his Kontinental Hockey League debut playing with Admiral Vladivostok during the 2013–14 season. In August 2014 he signed a one-year deal with HC Neftekhimik Nizhnekamsk.

Antropov as a free agent secured a one-year contract in a return to his original KHL club, Admiral Vladivostok, on August 7, 2018. In the following 2018–19 season, Antropov contributed just 1 goal in 17 games for Admiral, before opting to leave the KHL and signing a month long trial for Piráti Chomutov of the ELH on December 22, 2018.
