= 2015 KHL Junior Draft =

General information
- Date: 24–25 May 2015
- Location: Moscow, Russia

Overview
- League: KHL
- First selection: (Russia) Artyom Maltsev; Selected by: HC Sochi

The 2015 KHL Junior Draft was the seventh entry draft held by the Kontinental Hockey League (KHL), taking place on 24–25 May 2015 in VTB Arena. Ice hockey players from around the world aged between 17 and 21 years of age were selected. Players eligible to take part in the draft were required to not have an active contract with a KHL, MHL or VHL team.

== Selections by round ==
=== Round 1 ===
Rank	Player	Position	Nationality	KHL team	Drafted from
1	Artyom Maltsev	D	Russia	HC Sochi	Serebrianye Lvi Saint Petersburg
2	Igor Kabanov	AG	Russia	Metallurg Novokuznetsk	Krylya Sovetov
3	Jakub Lacka	A	Slovakia	HC Slovan Bratislava	HC Trinec
4	Dominik Simon	A	Czech Republic	Lokomotiv Yaroslavl	HC Plzeň
5	Timofei Filippov	D	Russia	Lada Togliatti	Yugra Khanty-Mansiysk
6	Igor Geraskin	A	Russia	Severstal Cherepovets	Atlant Mytichtchi
7	Petr Mrázek	G	Czech Republic	Lokomotiv Yaroslavl	Grand Rapids Griffins
8	Vladislav Syomin	D	Russia	SKA Saint Petersburg	Tyumen Legion
9	Alexei Ozhgikhin	D	Russia	SKA Saint Petersburg	Tyumen Legion
10	Vladislav Gross	G	Russia	SKA Saint Petersburg	Salavat Yulaev Ufa
11	Anton Sharpanskikh	A	Russia	SKA Saint Petersburg	Sputnik Nizhny Tagil
12	Nikita Kizikov	A	Russia	SKA Saint Petersburg	Krylya Sovetov
13	Samuel Fereta	D	Slovakia	Traktor Chelyabinsk	HC Slovan Bratislava
14	Anatoli Yelizarov	D	Russia; Kazakhstan	Salavat Yulaev Ufa	Dinamo Saint Petersburg
15	Konstantin Chernyuk	D	Russia	HC Sochi	Wichita Falls Wildcats
16	Anton Vasilyev	F	Russia	Yugra Khanty-Mansiysk	HC MVD
17	Kirill Baldin	F	Russia	Barys Astana	Avtomobilist Yekaterinburg
18	Petr Zámorský	D	Czech Republic	Lokomotiv Yaroslavl	HC Zlín
19	Juuse Saros	G	Finland	HK Dinamo Minsk	Hämeenlinnan Pallokerho
20	Anton Forsberg	G	Sweden	Avangard Omsk	Springfield Falcons
21	Daniil Lapin	F	Russia	Sibir Novosibirsk	Sibir Novosibirsk
22	Sergei Orlov	D	Russia	Metallurg Magnitogorsk	Avangard Omsk
23	Vladislav Dzhioshvili	F	Russia	HC Sochi	Bloomington Thunder
24	Dmitri Muzhikov	D	Russia	Ak Bars Kazan	Dizelist Penza
25	Maxim Dubovik	D	Russia	Avtomobilist Yekaterinburg	Mechel Chelyabinsk
26	Alexander Derbenyov	A	Russia	Avtomobilist Yekaterinburg	Avtomobilist Yekaterinburg
27	Maxim Chuvilov	AD	Russia	HC CSKA Moscow	Krasnaya Armia
28	Alexei Gerich	D	Russia	HC CSKA Moscow	HC CSKA Moscow

=== Round 2 ===
Rank	Player	Position	Nationality	KHL team	Drafted from
29	Nikita Vorobyov	D	Russia	Amur Khabarovsk	Amur Khabarovsk
30	Grigori Vorobyov	A	Russia	Metallurg Magnitogorsk	Tyumenski Legion
31	Martin Bodák	D	Slovakia	HC Slovan Bratislava	HC Spišská Nová Ves
32	Daniil Vertiy	AG	Russia	Yugra Khanty-Mansiysk	Windsor Spitfires
33	Mikhail Drobyshevsky	G	Russia	Avtomobilist Yekaterinburg	Avtomobilist Yekaterinburg
34	Ivan Voronov	D	Russia	Salavat Yulaev Ufa	HC MVD
35	Vitali Mikhailov	A	Russia	Ak Bars Kazan	Severstal Cherepovets
36	Patrik Laine	AD	Finland	Dinamo Riga	Tappara Tampere
37	Artur Voitsekh	D	Russia	Traktor Chelyabinsk	Traktor Chelyabinsk
38	Janne Kuokkanen	C	Finland	Ak Bars Kazan	Kärpät Oulu
39	Linus Lindström	C	Sweden	Dinamo Riga	Skellefteå AIK
40	Filip Pavlík	D	Czech Republic	Avangard Omsk	HC Litvínov
41	Marcus Sörensen	AG	Sweden	HC CSKA Moscow	Djurgården Hockey
42	Dmitri Sukhodoyev	D	Russia	Traktor Chelyabinsk	Traktor Chelyabinsk
43	Pavel Voronkov	A	Russia	KHL Medveščak Zagreb	Belye Medvedi Moscow
44	Jesse Puljujärvi	AD	Finland	Torpedo Nizhny Novgorod	Kärpät Oulu
45	Danila Bogush	A	Russia	Barys Astana	Yugra Khanty-Mansiysk
46	Mattias Janmark	A	Sweden	Lokomotiv Yaroslavl	Frölunda HC
47	Esa Lindell	D	Finland	HK Dinamo Minsk	Ässät Pori
48	Denis Tolpegin	D	Russia	Severstal Cherepovets	HC Dynamo Moscow
49	Daniil Shabarov	A	Russia	SKA Saint Petersburg	SKA Saint Petersburg
50	Saveli Kozlov	D	Russia	Metallurg Magnitogorsk	Belye Medvedi Orenburg
51	Eetu Tuulola	AD	Finland	Jokerit Helsinki	Hämeenlinnan Pallokerho
52	Nikolai Pikushin	A	Russia	Neftekhimik Nizhnekamsk	Lokomotiv Yaroslavl
53	Maxim Uskov	A	Russia	HC Dynamo Moscow	HC Dynamo Moscow
54	Maxim Gibadullin	G	Russia	SKA Saint Petersburg	SKA-Varyagi im. Morozova
55	Alexei Kuzmin	D	Russia	HC CSKA Moscow	HC CSKA Moscow

=== Round 3 ===
Rank	Player	Position	Nationality	KHL team	Drafted from
56	Nikolai Pavlov	D	Russia	Amur Khabarovsk	Springfield Jr. Blues
57	Vladimir Zabolotsky	D	Russia	HC CSKA Moscow	Krasnaya Armia
58	Samuel Rudy	D	Slovakia	HC Slovan Bratislava	HC Pardubice
59	Nikita Ivanov	A	Russia	Yugra Khanty-Mansiysk	Krasnaya Armia
60	Alexei Yepifanov	A	Russia	Salavat Yulaev Ufa	Krylya Sovetov
61	Pavel Tkatchkov	A	Russia	KHL Medveščak Zagreb	HC Spartak Moscow
62	Yan Khomenko	A	Russia	Ak Bars Kazan	HC MVD
63	Markus Niemeläinen	D	Finland	Dinamo Riga	Hämeenlinnan Pallokerho
64	Dmitri Varlamov	A	Russia	HC Vityaz	HC Vityaz
65	Bayras Abdullin	A	Russia	Metallurg Magnitogorsk	Salavat Yulaev Ufa
66	Yevgeni Yargayev	D	Russia	Torpedo Nizhny Novgorod	Dizel Penza
67	Denis Khismatulin	A	Russia	Traktor Chelyabinsk	Traktor Chelyabinsk
68	Yevgeni Zhavoronkov	D	Russia	Salavat Yulaev Ufa	HC Spartak Moscow
69	Jordan Weal	A	Canada	HC Sochi	Manchester Monarchs
70	Nikita Pislegin	D	Russia	Torpedo Nizhny Novgorod	Izhstal Izhevsk
71	Alexei Luchevnikov	A	Russia	Barys Astana	Mechel Chelyabinsk
72	Roope Hintz	A	Finland	Lokomotiv Yaroslavl	Ilves Tampere
73	Marcus Högberg	G	Sweden	HK Dinamo Minsk	Linköpings HC
74	Axel Holmström	C	Sweden	Avangard Omsk	Skellefteå AIK
75	Daniil Kurashov	D	Russia	Admiral Vladivostok	HC Spartak Moscow
76	Robin Salo	D	Finland	Jokerit Helsinki	Sport Vaasa
77	Nikita Sudenkov	D	Russia	Lada Togliatti	Yugra Khanty-Mansiysk
78	Semyon Pankratov	A	Russia	HC Dynamo Moscow	HC Dynamo Moscow
79	Andrei Alexeyev	A	Russia	HC CSKA Moscow	HC CSKA Moscow

=== Round 4 ===
Rank	Player	Position	Nationality	KHL team	Drafted from
80	Valeri Naumenko	A	Russia	Amur Khabarovsk	Russkie Vityazi
81	Joonas Niemelä	C	Finland	HC Vityaz	Blues Espoo
82	Samuel Solenský	AG	Slovakia	HC Slovan Bratislava	HC Bílí Tygři Liberec
83	Pavel Vasilyev	D	Russia	Yugra Khanty-Mansiysk	Lada Togliatti
84	Nikita Strizhov	A	Russia	Metallurg Magnitogorsk	Metallurg Magnitogorsk
85	Vitali Tarasov	D	Russia	KHL Medveščak Zagreb	Rus Moscow
86	Danil Galeyev	D	Russia	Neftekhimik Nizhnekamsk	Salavat Yulaev Ufa
87	Danila Vassiliev	A	Russia	KHL Medveščak Zagreb	Rous Moscou
88	Lukas Vejdemo	C	Sweden	HC Vityaz	Djurgården Hockey
89	Oliver Felixson	D	Finland	SKA Saint Petersburg	HIFK
90	Dmitri Levashov	A	Russia	Avtomobilist Yekaterinburg	Avtomobilist Yekaterinburg
91	Vladimir Beloglazov	A	Russia	Severstal Cherepovets	HC Vityaz
92	Nikita Podskrebalin	G	Russia	Traktor Chelyabinsk	Traktor Chelyabinsk
93	Mikhail Denisov	G	Russia	Salavat Yulaev Ufa	Krylya Sovetov
94	Boris Katchouk	AG	Canada	HC Sochi	Soo Greyhounds
95	Alexander Dudin	A	Russia	Torpedo Nizhny Novgorod	Dizel Penza
96	Alexander Melikhov	A	Kazakhstan	Barys Astana	Salavat Yulaev Ufa
97	Tomáš Nosek	A	Czech Republic	Lokomotiv Yaroslavl	Grand Rapids Griffins
98	Andreas Johnsson	AG	Sweden	HK Dinamo Minsk	Frölunda HC
99	Linus Ullmark	G	Sweden	Avangard Omsk	MODO Hockey
100	Adel Sadykov	D	Russia	Sibir Novosibirsk	Neftekhimik Nizhnekamsk
101	Maxim Mishakov	D	Russia	Metallurg Magnitogorsk	HC Spartak Moscow
102	Tarmo Reunanen	D	Finland	Jokerit Helsinki	TPS Turku
103	Filip Gustavsson	G	Sweden	Ak Bars Kazan	Luleå HF
104	Dmitri Grishchenko	D	Russia	HC Dynamo Moscow	HC MVD
105	Jacob Moverare	D	Sweden	SKA Saint Petersburg	HV 71
106	Adam Movsarov	A	Russia	HC CSKA Moscow	Krasnaya Armia

=== Round 5 ===
Rank	Player	Position	Nationality	KHL team	Drafted from
107	Gleb Semyonov	A	Russia	Neftekhimik Nizhnekamsk	Torpedo Nizhny Novgorod
108	Gleb Morulyov	C	Russia	Severstal Cherepovets	HC Vityaz
109	Viktor Arvidsson	AG	Sweden	Salavat Yulaev Ufa	Milwaukee Admirals
110	Konstantin Berkutov	D	Russia	Yugra Khanty-Mansiysk	Metallourg Magnitogorsk
111	Alexei Puzanov	A	Russia	Neftekhimik Nizhnekamsk	Neftekhimik Nizhnekamsk
112	Tikhon Ivanov	D	Russia	KHL Medveščak Zagreb	Lokomotiv Yaroslavl
113	Rodion Ulchinsky	D	Russia	Neftekhimik Nizhnekamsk	Neftekhimik Nizhnekamsk
114	Roberts Blugers	A	Latvia	Dinamo Riga	Shattuck St Mary's
115	Jesper Lindgren	C	Sweden	HC Vityaz	MODO Hockey
116	Adam Thilander	D	Sweden	SKA Saint Petersburg	Skellefteå AIK
117	Sergei Chyobotov	A	Russia	Avtomobilist Yekaterinburg	Mechel Chelyabinsk
118	Kirill Chernyavsky	A	Russia	Severstal Cherepovets	HC Dynamo Moscow
119	Nikita Tertyshny	G	Russia	Traktor Chelyabinsk	Traktor Chelyabinsk
120	Rocco Grimaldi	G	United States	Salavat Yulaev Ufa	San Antonio Rampage
121	Nick Cousins	AG	Canada	HC Sochi	Lehigh Valley Phantoms
122	Yuri Zholobov	A	Russia	Severstal Cherepovets	Avangard Omsk
123	Alexander Borisevich	A	Kazakhstan	Barys Astana	Yunost Karaganda
124	Julius Bergman	A	Sweden	Lokomotiv Yaroslavl	London Knights
125	Patrik Bartosak	AG	Czech Republic	HK Dinamo Minsk	Manchester Monarchs
126	Marek Ruzicka	G	Czech Republic	Avangard Omsk	HC Oceláři Třinec
127	Konstantin Dubin	D	Russia	Metallurg Magnitogorsk	HC Dynamo Moscow
128	Artyom Popitich	D	Russia	Metallurg Magnitogorsk	Lokomotiv Yaroslavl
129	Otto Koivula	D	Finland	Jokerit Helsinki	Ilves Tampere
130	Nick Pastujov	G	United States	Ak Bars Kazan	USNTDP
131	Alexander Nikitin	D	Russia	HC Dynamo Moscow	HC Dynamo Moscow
132	Gustavs Davis Grigals	D	Latvia	Dinamo Riga	SK Riga
133	Robin Kovacs	A	Sweden	HC CSKA Moscow	AIK IF

== See also ==
- 2015–16 KHL season
- 2015 NHL entry draft
- KHL territorial pick
