= Mikhail Pashnin =

Russian ice hockey player (born 1989)

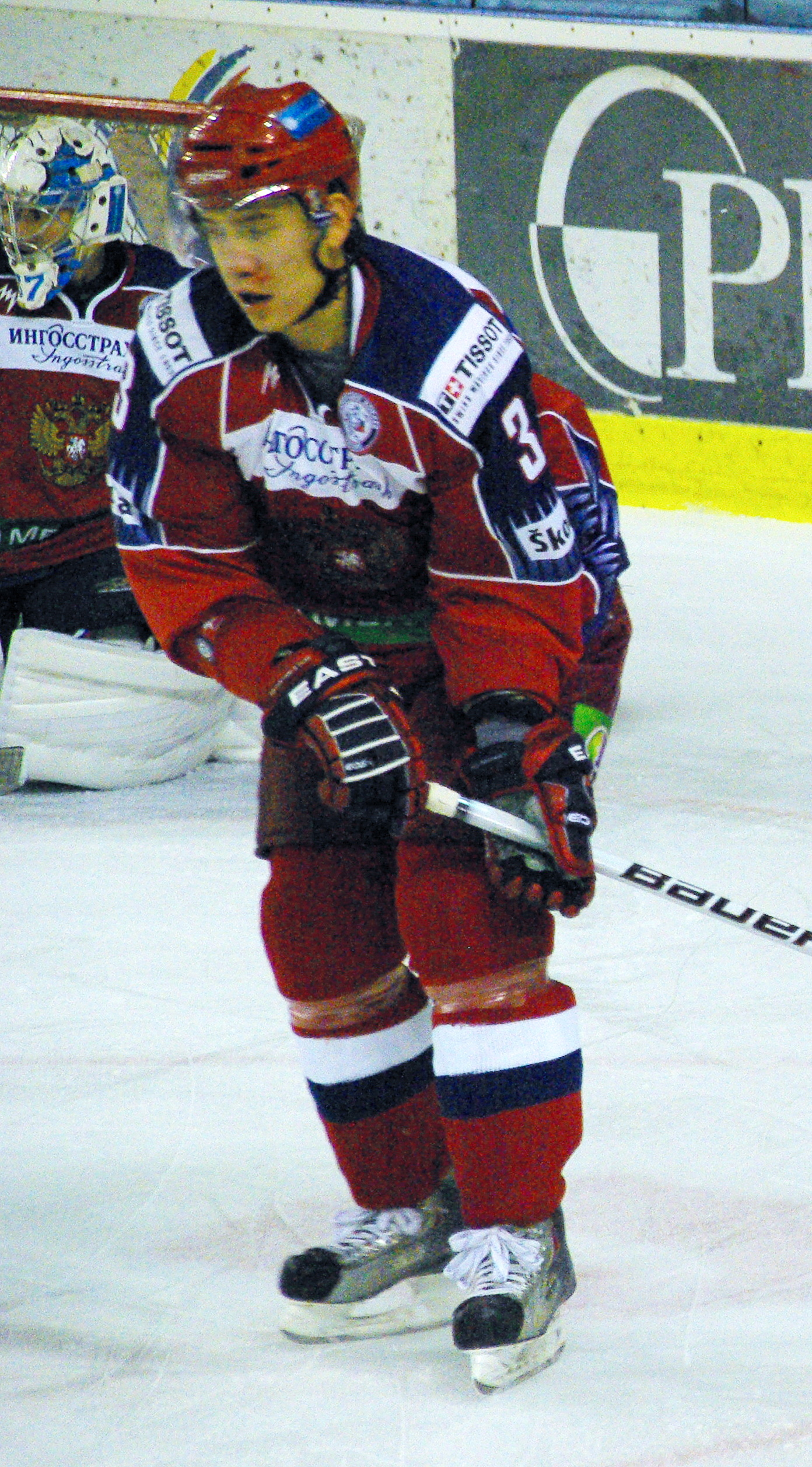
- Born: 11 May 1989 (age 37) Chelyabinsk, Russian SFSR, Soviet Union
- Height: 6 ft 1 in (185 cm)
- Weight: 190 lb (86 kg; 13 st 8 lb)
- Position: Defence
- Shoots: Left
- KHL team Former teams: Free agent CSKA Moscow; Lokomotiv Yaroslavl; Salavat Yulaev Ufa; Metallurg Magnitogorsk; SKA Saint Petersburg; Neftekhimik Nizhnekamsk
- NHL draft: 200th overall, 2009; New York Rangers
- Playing career: 2006–present

Mikhail Valeryevich Pashnin (Russian: Михаил Валерьевич Пашнин; born 11 May 1989, in Chelyabinsk, Russia) is a Russian professional ice hockey defenceman who is currently an unrestricted free agent. He most recently played for HC Neftekhimik Nizhnekamsk in the Kontinental Hockey League (KHL). He was drafted in the 7th round of the 2009 NHL entry draft by the New York Rangers, and he was also the 1st overall pick in that year's KHL Junior Draft by CSKA Moscow.

== Playing career ==
Pashnin never signed a contract with the Rangers, opting to remain in Russia, signing a two-year contract extension with Lokomotiv Yaroslavl on 7 April 2015.

In the 2018–19 season, his fifth within CSKA Moscow, Pashnin, as a regular on the blueline, appeared in 42 regular season games for 5 points. He made 6 post-season appearances to help CSKA capture their first Gagarin Cup.

On 1 June 2019, Pashnin left CSKA as a free agent, signing a one-year contract with his third KHL club, Salavat Yulaev Ufa. In the 2019–20 season, Pashnin appeared in 54 regular season games from the blueline, finishing a point shy of previous career highs with 10. He registered 2 assists in Salavat's opening round defeat of Avangard Omsk before the remainder of the playoffs were cancelled due to the COVID-19 pandemic.

As a free agent from Salavat, Pashnin again moved to sign a two-year contract with Metallurg Magnitogorsk on 7 May 2020.

Upon completion of his contract with Magnitogorsk, Pashnin signed a two-year contract with his fifth KHL club, SKA Saint Petersburg, on 9 May 2022.

In December 2024, Pashnin signed a one-year deal with Neftekhimik Nizhnekamsk of the KHL.

== Career statistics ==
=== Regular season and playoffs ===
			Regular season					Playoffs
Season	Team	League	GP	G	A	Pts	PIM	GP	G	A	Pts	PIM
2006–07	Mechel Chelyabinsk	RUS 2	41	0	2	2	40	—	—	—	—	—
2007–08	Mechel Chelyabinsk	RUS 2	49	2	5	7	58	—	—	—	—	—
2008–09	Mechel Chelyabinsk	RUS 2	36	4	12	16	32	—	—	—	—	—
2009–10	CSKA Moscow	KHL	44	1	4	5	52	1	0	0	0	0
2010–11	CSKA Moscow	KHL	43	2	2	4	38	—	—	—	—	—
2011–12	CSKA Moscow	KHL	50	3	2	5	68	5	0	1	1	20
2012–13	Lokomotiv Yaroslavl	KHL	32	1	1	2	75	6	0	0	0	6
2013–14	Lokomotiv Yaroslavl	KHL	32	0	3	3	114	16	0	1	1	14
2014–15	Lokomotiv Yaroslavl	KHL	32	0	2	2	22	5	0	0	0	29
2015–16	Lokomotiv Yaroslavl	KHL	39	3	5	8	42	3	0	0	0	14
2016–17	Lokomotiv Yaroslavl	KHL	58	0	11	11	78	15	0	0	0	14
2017–18	CSKA Moscow	KHL	45	1	10	11	61	20	1	1	2	14
2018–19	CSKA Moscow	KHL	42	1	4	5	37	6	0	0	0	6
2019–20	Salavat Yulaev Ufa	KHL	54	2	8	10	59	6	0	2	2	10
2020–21	Metallurg Magnitogorsk	KHL	44	3	6	9	66	12	0	3	3	14
2021–22	Metallurg Magnitogorsk	KHL	27	1	10	11	31	5	0	1	1	2
2022–23	SKA Saint Petersburg	KHL	31	3	3	6	30	9	0	0	0	9
2023–24	SKA Saint Petersburg	KHL	20	2	6	8	12	4	0	1	1	4
2024–25	Neftekhimik Nizhnekamsk	KHL	14	1	0	1	4	—	—	—	—	—
KHL totals			606	24	77	101	789	113	1	10	11	156

Medal record

Representing Russia

Ice hockey

World Junior Championships
Bronze medal – third place	2009 Canada	

=== International ===
Year	Team	Event	Result	GP	G	A	Pts	PIM
2009	Russia	WJC	3rd place, bronze medalist(s)	7	0	2	2	2
Junior totals				7	0	2	2	2

== Awards and honors ==
Award	Year
KHL
Gagarin Cup (CSKA Moscow)	2019

== See also ==
- List of first overall KHL draft picks
