= Miro Hovinen =

Finnish ice hockey player

- Born: April 29, 1992 (age 32); Espoo, Finland
- Height: 6 ft 3 in (191 cm)
- Weight: 209 lb (95 kg; 14 st 13 lb)
- Position: Defence
- Shoots: Left
- team: Without team
- NHL draft: Undrafted
- Playing career: 2012–present

Miro Hovinen (born April 29, 1992) is a Finnish ice hockey defenceman.

Hovinen made his SM-liiga debut playing with Ilves during the 2012–13 SM-liiga season.
