= MHC Krylya Sovetov =

Russian ice hockey team

- City: Moscow
- League: MHL 2016–: Minor Hockey League (2009–2011); Russian Major League (2008)
- Division: Center
- Founded: 2008
- Home arena: Dmitrov (capacity: 2200)
- Colours: Blue, White, Red
- Head coach: Semyon Golikov
- Affiliate: Spartak Moscow (KHL)
- Website: http://www.hcdmitrov.ru/

Franchise history
- MHC Krylya Sovetov

MHC Krylya Sovetov (Russian: МХК Крылья Советов; lit. Moscow Hockey Club Soviet Wings) are a junior ice hockey team based in Moscow, Russia. The team initially existed for two years after PHC Krylya Sovetov were expelled from the Soviet Wings Sport Palace in 2008 and the owner of the arena created a new team. MHC Krylya Sovetov was reunited with PHC Krylya Sovetov in 2010. They resumed played in 2016 in the MHL serving as a junior affiliate to Spartak Moscow of the Kontinental Hockey League (KHL).

== History ==
=== Controversy ===

In 2008, the owner of the Soviet Wings Sport Palace, the All-Russia Institute of Light Alloys (VILS) (Russian: Всероссийский институт лёгких сплавов (ВИЛС) accused Krylya Sovetov of overdue rent payments. This led to the subsequent eviction of the team. The current team left under president Aleksandr Tretiak's lead, but Krylya's hockey school, junior subsidiary teams, and other infrastructure opted to remain under the effective ownership of VILS. In light of this, VILS created a new team MHC Krylya Sovetov.

MHC Krylya Sovetov's main team did not play in the 2009–10 season since the definitive calendar of games for the 2009–10 season of the Russian Major League only contained PHC Krylya Sovetov in the Western Division. MHC Krylya Sovetov's junior team however played in the newly formed Minor Hockey League.

According to KHL website Alexander Medvedev contacted both the administration of PHC Krylya Sovetov and MHC Krylya Sovetov and the two clubs with the help of KHL will be reunited into a single organization once again after the split in 2008.

The reunited team will play their games in Setun, Moscow, where MHC Krylya Sovetov played their games after the 2008 split. The junior team will play in Dmitrov.
