= 2012 KHL Junior Draft =

Hockey draft

General information
- Date: 25–26 May 2012
- Location: Chelyabinsk, Russia

Overview
- League: KHL
- First selection: (Russia) Denis Alexandrov; Selected by: SKA Saint Petersburg

The 2012 KHL Junior Draft was the fourth entry draft held by the Kontinental Hockey League (KHL), taking place on 25–26 May 2012 in Traktor Sport Palace. Ice hockey players from around the world aged between 17 and 21 years of age were selected. Players eligible to take part in the draft were required to not have an active contract with a KHL, MHL or VHL team. A total of 998 players participated in the draft, 778 of these playing in Russia, 110 in Europe and 110 in North America.

Denis Alexandrov, a defenceman from MHC Krylya Sovetov, was the first overall selection, chosen by SKA Saint Petersburg.

== Selections by round ==
=== Round 1 ===
| Rank | Player | Position | Nationality | KHL team | Drafted from | Protected player |
|---|---|---|---|---|---|---|
| 1 | Denis Alexandrov | D | Russia | SKA Saint Petersburg | Krylya Sovetov | |
| 2 | Aleksander Barkov | F | Finland Russia | Lokomotiv Yaroslavl | Tappara Tampere | |
| 3 | Rinat Valiyev | D | Russia | Ak Bars Kazan | Ak Bars Kazan | |
| 4 | Nikita Zadorov | D | Russia | HK CSKA Moscow | HK CSKA Moscow | |
| 5 | Viktor Baldayev | D | Russia | Atlant Moscow Oblast | Kristall Elektrostal | |
| 6 | Vladislav Boyko | F | Russia | HK CSKA Moscow | Krylia Sovetov | |
| 7 | Radek Faksa | F | Czech Republic | HC Neftekhimik Nizhnekamsk | Kitchener Rangers | |
| 8 | Nikolay Goldobin | F | Russia | Metallurg Novokuznetsk | Vityaz Chekhov | |
| 9 | Rihards Bukarts | F | Latvia | Dinamo Riga | Kapitan Stupino | |
| 10 | Dmitri Yudin | D | Russia | HC Yugra | Spotnik Nizhny Tagil | |
| 11 | Valeri Nichushkin | | Russia | Traktor Chelyabinsk | Traktor Chelyabinsk | 1/5 |
| 12 | Roman Graborenko | D | Belarus | Dinamo Minsk | Drummondville Voltigeurs | |
| 13 | Rasmus Ristolainen | D | Finland | Amur Khabarovsk | TPS Turku | |
| 14 | Tomáš Hertl | F | Czech Republic | Severstal Cherepovets | HC Slavia Prague | |
| 15 | Stanislav Znitchenko | | Russia | Avangard Omsk | Avangard Omsk | 1/5 |
| 16 | Ivan Fichtchenko | | Russia | Avangard Omsk | Avangard Omsk | 2/5 |
| 17 | Madiar Ibraibekov | D | Kazakhstan | Barys Astana | Barys Astana | |
| 18 | Andrei Filonenko | G | Russia | HK CSKA Moscow | HK CSKA Moscow | |
| 19 | Martin Gernát | D | Slovakia | Salavat Yulayev Ufa | Edmonton Oil Kings | |
| 20 | Sergei Stetsenko | | Russia | HK CSKA Moscow | HK CSKA Moscow | 1/5 |
| 21 | Mikhaïl Tikhonov | | Russia | SKA Saint Petersburg | HK Russ | |
| 22 | Ruzal Galeyev | F | Russia | Ak Bars Kazan | Ak Bars Kazan | |
| 23 | Ville Pokka | D | Finland | Avangard Omsk | Kärpät Oulu | |
| 24 | Ruslan Bazanov | D | Russia | Metallurg Magnitogorsk | HK CSKA Moscow | |
| 25 | Pavel Buchnevich | | Russia | Severstal Tcherepovets | Severstal Tcherepovets | 1/5 |
| 26 | Juuso Ikonen | F | Finland | Metallurg Novokuznetsk | Blues Espoo | |
| 27 | Artyom Kuleshov | D | Russia | Torpedo Nizhny Novgorod | Krylia Sovetov | |
| 28 | Sergei Tolchinsky | F | Russia | HK CSKA Moscow | HK CSKA Moscow | |
| 29 | Vladislav Lysenko | D | Ukraine | Atlant Moscow Oblast | Atlant Moscow Oblast | 1/5 |
| 30 | Hampus Lindholm | D | Sweden | HC Donbass | Rögle BK | |
| 31 | Tomáš Rachůnek | F | Czech Republic | HC Lev Praha | HC Sparta Prague | |
| 32 | Marko Daňo | F | Slovakia | HC Slovan Bratislava | HC Dukla Trenčín | |

=== Round 2 ===
| Rank | Player | Position | Nationality | KHL team | Drafted from | Protected player |
|---|---|---|---|---|---|---|
| 33 | Ivan Barbashev | | Russia | OHK Dinamo | OHK Dinamo | 1/5 |
| 34 | Andrei Alexeyev | | Russia | OHK Dinamo | OHK Dinamo | 2/5 |
| 35 | Grigory Dikushin | | Russia | HK CSKA Moscow | HK CSKA Moscow | 2/5 |
| 36 | Nikita Serebriakov | | Russia | OHK Dinamo | OHK Dinamo | 3/5 |
| 37 | Viktor Gavrikov | D | Russia | Lokomotiv Yaroslavl | Lokomotiv Yaroslavl | |
| 38 | Viktor Shakhvorostov | F | Russia | Ak Bars Kazan | Ak Bars Kazan | |
| 39 | Konstantin Zavarin | | Russia | Traktor Chelyabinsk | Traktor Chelyabinsk | 2/5 |
| 40 | Alexander Charov | | Russia | Traktor Chelyabinsk | Traktor Chelyabinsk | 3/5 |
| 41 | Phil Baltisberger | D | Switzerland | HC Yugra | ZSC Lions | |
| 42 | Rickard Rakell | F | Sweden | Sibir Novossibirsk | Plymouth Whalers | |
| 43 | Igor Shestyorkin | G | Russia | HK Spartak Moscow | Krylia Sovetov | |
| 44 | Maxim Mamin | F | Russia | HK CSKA Moscow | HK CSKA Moscow | |
| 45 | Alexei Zakarlyukin | F | Russia | Traktor Chelyabinsk | Traktor Chelyabinsk | 4/5 |
| 46 | Pavel Medvedev | D | Russia | Metallurg Magnitogorsk | OHK Dinamo | |
| 47 | Daniil Zharkov | F | Russia | Metallurg Novokuznetsk | Belleville Bulls | |
| 48 | Georgs Golovkovs | F | Latvia | Dinamo Riga | Metalurgs Liepaja | |
| 49 | Konstantin Okulov | | Russia | Sibir Novossibirsk | Sibir Novossibirsk | 1/5 |
| 50 | Valentin Zykov | | Russia | HK CSKA Moscow | HK CSKA Moscow | 3/5 |
| 51 | Forfeited pick | | | HK Spartak Moscow | | |
| 52 | Kirill Vorobev | | Russia | HK CSKA Moscow | HK CSKA Moscow | 4/5 |
| 53 | Alexander Charov | | Russia | HK CSKA Moscow | HK CSKA Moscow | 5/5 |
| 54 | Niklas Tikkinen | F | Finland | Metallurg Novokuznetsk | Espoo Blues Jr. | |
| 55 | Johan Gustafsson | G | Sweden | Amur Khabarovsk | Luleå HF | |
| 56 | Ludvig Byström | D | Sweden | Severstal Cherepovets | MODO Hockey | |
| 57 | Artturi Lehkonen | F | Finland | SKA Saint Petersburg | TPS Turku | |
| 58 | Vyacheslav Volkov | G | Russia | Atlant Moscow Oblast | HK CSKA Moscow | |
| 59 | Roman Dubinin | D | Russia | Salavat Yulayev Ufa | Salavat Yulayev Ufa | |
| 60 | Sergei Diachenko | A | Russia | Torpedo Nizhny Novgorod | HK Russ | |
| 61 | Ruslan Trubkin | D | Russia | Ak Bars Kazan | Ak Bars Kazan | |
| 62 | Nikolai Glukhov | D | Russia | Avangard Omsk | Avangard Omsk | |
| 63 | Igor Majouga | | Russia | Avangard Omsk | Avangard Omsk | 3/5 |
| 64 | Pavel Zykov | A | Russia | Metallurg Magnitogorsk | HK CSKA Moscow | |
| 65 | Vladimir Briukvin | A | Russia | OHK Dinamo | OHK Dinamo | |
| 66 | Pontus Åberg | A | Sweden | SKA Saint Petersburg | Djurgården | |
| 67 | Vladimir Yonin | A | Russia | Traktor Chelyabinsk | Traktor Chelyabinsk | |
| 68 | Erik Karlsson | D | Sweden | HC Donbass | Frölunda HC | |
| 69 | Vojtěch Mozík | D | Czech Republic | HC Lev Praha | BK Mladá Boleslav | |
| 70 | Martin Réway | A | Czech Republic; Slovakia | HC Slovan Bratislava | HC Sparta Prague | |

=== Round 3 ===
| Rank | Player | Position | Nationality | KHL team | Drafted from | Protected player |
|---|---|---|---|---|---|---|
| 71 | Rushan Rafikov | D | Russia | Lokomotiv Yaroslavl | Lokomotiv Yaroslavl | |
| 72 | Nikita Shatskin | | Russia | Vityaz Chekhov | Vityaz Chekhov | |
| 73 | Vladimir Tkatchev | | Russia | Avangard Omsk | Avangard Omsk | 4/5 |
| 74 | Alexei Abrosimov | | Russia | Avangard Omsk | Avangard Omsk | 5/5 |
| 75 | Vadim Khrischpents | | Russia | Yugra Khanty-Mansiysk | Avangard Omsk | |
| 76 | Roman Rachinsky | | Russia | Sibir Novossibirsk | Sibir Novossibirsk | 2/5 |
| 77 | Yegor Yudov | | Russia | HK Spartak Moscow | Krylia Sovetov | |
| 78 | Georgy Makkaev | | Russia | HK CSKA Moscow | HK CSKA Moscow | |
| 79 | Koo Danila | | Russia | HK CSKA Moscow | Lada Togliatti | |
| 80 | Vsevolod Yastrebkov | | Russia | Ak Bars Kazan | Ak Bars Kazan | 1/5 |
| 81 | Maxim Pushkarsky | | Russia | Ak Bars Kazan | Ak Bars Kazan | 2/5 |
| 82 | Ziyat Paigin | | Russia | Ak Bars Kazan | Ak Bars Kazan | 3/5 |
| 83 | Evgeni Lyzin | | Russia | Ak Bars Kazan | Ak Bars Kazan | 4/5 |
| 84 | Dmitri Kashtanov | | Russia | Ak Bars Kazan | Ak Bars Kazan | 5/5 |
| 85 | Rafael Chakurov | | Russia | Neftekhimik Nizhnekamsk | Ak Bars Kazan | |
| 86 | Ilya Ivanov | | Russia | Metallurg Novokuznetsk | Vityaz Chekhov | |
| 87 | Elvis Merzļikins | G | Latvia | Dinamo Riga | HC Lugano jr. | |
| 88 | Artyom Mikeyev | | Russia | Ak Bars Kazan | Ak Bars Kazan | |
| 89 | Denis Dalidovitch | F | Belarus | Dinamo Minsk | Minot Minotauros | |
| 90 | Jani Hakanpää | D | Finland | Amur Khabarovsk | Espoo Blues | |
| 91 | Sven Bärtschi | F | Switzerland | Severstal Cherepovets | Calgary Flames | |
| 92 | Calle Andersson | D | Sweden | SKA Saint Petersburg | Färjestads BK | |
| 93 | Vladislav Gritskikh | | Russia | Neftekhimik Nizhnekamsk | Ak Bars Kazan | |
| 94 | Nicklas Jensen | A | Denmark | Salavat Yulayev Ufa | Oshawa Generals | |
| 95 | Evgeni Filin | | Russia | Torpedo Nizhni Novgorod | Neftianik Almetievsk | |
| 96 | Forfeited pick | | | Ak Bars Kazan | | |
| 97 | Ivan Teterin | | Russia | Avtomobilist Yekaterinburg | Avtomobilist Yekaterinburg | 1/5 |
| 98 | Anton Nekryach | | Russia | Sibir Novossibirsk | Sibir Novossibirsk | 2/5 |
| 99 | Evgeni Kubasov | | Russia | Avangard Omsk | Sibir Novossibirsk | |
| 100 | Andrei Alexeyev | | Russia | Metallurg Magnitogorsk | Ak Bars Kazan | |
| 101 | Ivan Bocharov | | Russia | OHK Dinamo | OHK Dinamo | |
| 102 | André Burakovsky | A | Sweden | SKA Saint Petersburg | Malmö Redhawks | |
| 103 | Artyom Penkovsky | | Russia | Traktor Chelyabinsk | Traktor Chelyabinsk | |
| 104 | Yegor Morozov | | Russia | HC Donbass | Lada Togliatti | |
| 105 | Lukáš Žejdl | A | Czech Republic | HC Lev Praha | HC Slavia Prague | |
| 106 | Dominik Rehák | A | Slovakia | HC Slovan Bratislava | MsHK Žilina | |

=== Round 4 ===
| Rank | Player | Position | Nationality | KHL team | Drafted from | Protected player |
|---|---|---|---|---|---|---|
| 107 | Alexander Mokchantsev | F | Russia | Lokomotiv Yaroslavl | Lokomotiv Yaroslavl | |
| 108 | Timur Bilyalov | | Russia | Ak Bars Kazan | Ak Bars Kazan | |
| 109 | Stepan Khripunov | | Russia | Avtomobilist Yekaterinburg | Salavat Yulayev Ufa | 1/5 |
| 110 | Vladislav Vorolayev | | Russia | Avtomobilist Yekaterinburg | Spoutnik Nizhni Taguil | |
| 111 | Jakub Orsava | F | Czech Republic | Sibir Novossibirsk | HC Trinec | |
| 112 | Artyom Prokhorov | | Russia | HK CSKA Moscow | Krylia Sovetov | |
| 113 | Nikita Cherepanov | | Russia | Lokomotiv Yaroslavl | Lokomotiv Yaroslavl | |
| 114 | Nathan MacKinnon | F | Canada | Vityaz Chekhov | Halifax Mooseheads | |
| 115 | Kevin Antipov | | Russia | Metallurg Novokuznetsk | HK CSKA Moscow | |
| 116 | Igor Boldin | | Russia | HK Spartak Moscow | HK Spartak Moscow | |
| 117 | Pavel Popov | | Russia | Yugra Khanty-Mansiïsk | Traktor Chelyabinsk | |
| 118 | Kristian Khenkel | D | Belarus | Dinamo Minsk | HK Yunost Minsk | |
| 119 | Joonas Korpisalo | G | Finland | Amur Khabarovsk | Jokerit jr. | |
| 120 | Kirill Grigoriev | | Russia | Severstal Cherepovets | HK Russ | |
| 121 | Nikita Mikhailis | F | Kazakhstan | Barys Astana | Barys Astana | |
| 122 | Dmitri Vorobyov | | Russia | HK Spartak Moscow | Krylia Sovetov | |
| 123 | Nikita Setdikov | | Russia | Salavat Yulayev Ufa | HK Russ | |
| 124 | Dmitri Yermochenko | | Russia | OHK Dinamo | OHK Dinamo | |
| 125 | Fredrik Claesson | D | Sweden | Severstal Cherepovets | Djurgården | |
| 126 | Fyodor Kozlovski | | Russia | Avangard Omsk | Avangard Omsk | |
| 127 | Vadim Orekhov | | Russia | Sibir Novossibirsk | Sibir Novossibirsk | |
| 128 | Andrei Mironov | | Russia | OHK Dinamo | OHK Dinamo | |
| 129 | Jonatan Nielsen | D | Sweden | SKA Saint Petersburg | Linköpings HC | |
| 130 | Andrei Yerofeyev | | Russia | Traktor Chelyabinsk | Traktor Chelyabinsk | |
| 131 | Henri Ikonen | F | Finland | HC Donbass | KalPa | |
| 132 | Jan Košťálek | D | Czech Republic | HC Lev Praha | HC Sparta Prague | |
| 133 | Matej Paulovič | F | Slovakia | HC Slovan Bratislava | Färjestad BK jr. | |

=== Round 5 ===
| Rank | Player | Position | Nationality | KHL team | Drafted from | Protected player |
|---|---|---|---|---|---|---|
| 134 | Dmitry Boychuk | | Russia | OHK Dinamo | OHK Dinamo | 4/5 |
| 135 | Roman Nikolayev | | Russia | OHK Dinamo | OHK Dinamo | 5/5 |
| 136 | Andrei Guerashshenko | | Russia | Lokomotiv Yaroslavl | OHK Dinamo | |
| 137 | Vincent Trocheck | F | United States | Vityaz Chekhov | Saginaw Spirit | |
| 138 | Maxim Belopachentsev | | Russia | Torpedo Nizhni Novgorod | Torpedo Nizhni Novgorod | 1/5 |
| 139 | Anatoli Golychev | | Russia | Avtomobilist Yekaterinnburg | Avtomobilist Yekaterinburg | |
| 140 | Wilhelm Westlund | D | Sweden | Metallourg Magnitogorsk | Färjestad BK | |
| 141 | Shane Prince | F | United States | Vityaz Chekhov | Ottawa 67's | |
| 142 | Viktor Zakharov | F | Ukraine | HK CSKA Moscow | HC Donbass | |
| 143 | Ilya Korenev | | Russia | Lokomotiv Yaroslavl | Lokomotiv Iaroslavl | Protected |
| 144 | Alexander Bryntsev | | Russia | Neftekhimik Nizhnekamsk | Neftekhimik Nizhnekamsk | |
| 145 | Ville Husso | G | Finland | Metallurg Novokuznetsk | HIFK jr. | |
| 146 | Ralf Rinke | F | Germany Latvia | Dinamo Riga | EHC Timmendorfer Strand 06 | |
| 147 | Dmitri Arsenyuk | | Russia | Metallurg Magnitogorsk | Metallurg Magnitogorsk | 1/5 |
| 148 | Pavel Varfomoleïev | | Russia | Yugra Khanty-Mansyisk | Metallurg Magnitogorsk | |
| 149 | Roman Dyukov | | Belarus | Dinamo Minsk | HK Yunost Minsk | |
| 150 | Vladislav Maslikin | | Russia | Sibir Novossibirsk | Sibir Novossibirsk | |
| 151 | Max Friberg | F | Sweden | Metallurg Novokuznetsk | Timrå IK | |
| 152 | Roman Stepanenko | D | Kazakhstan | Barys Astana | Barys Astana | |
| 153 | Denis Lyapustin | | Russia | Neftekhimik Nizhnekamsk | Neftekhimik Nizhnekamsk | |
| 154 | Artyom Moskalev | | Russia | SKA Saint Petersburg | SKA Saint Petersburg | 1/5 |
| 155 | Matěj Beran | F | Czech Republic | Salavat Yulayev Oufa | Prince Edward Island Rocket | |
| 156 | Yegor Ivanov | | Russia | Traktor Chelyabinsk | Traktor Chelyabinsk | 5/5 |
| 157 | Dmitri Yakunin | | Russia | Torpedo Nizhny Novgorod | HK CSKA Moscow | |
| 158 | Dmitri Marchenkov | | Russia | Yugra Khanty-Mansiysk | Metallurg Magnitogorsk | |
| 159 | Sergei Boldirev | | Russia | Metallurg Magnitogorsk | Metallurg Magnitogorsk | 2/5 |
| 160 | Anton Bespalov | | Russia | Avangard Omsk | | |
| 161 | Stanislav Perekhodyuk | | Russia | Metallurg Magnitogorsk | HK CSKA Moscow | |
| 162 | Saveli Ilyin | | Russia | OHK Dinamo | OHK Dinamo | |
| 163 | Konstantin Luchevnikov | | Russia | Avangard Omsk | Mechel Chelyabinsk | |
| 164 | Spencer Humphries | D | Canada | Traktor Chelyabinsk | Calgary Hitmen | |
| 165 | Vladimir Abashkin | | Russia | HC Donbass | Metallurg Magnitogorsk | |
| 164 | Roman Will | G | Czech Republic | HC Lev Praha | Moncton Wildcats | |
| 165 | Patrik Koyš | F | Slovakia | HC Slovan Bratislava | HC Dukla Trenčín jr. | |

== See also ==
- 2012–13 KHL season
- 2012 NHL entry draft
- KHL territorial pick
