= Rachůnek =

Rachůnek is a Czech surname. Notable people with the surname include:

- Ivan Rachůnek (born 1981), Czech ice hockey player
- Karel Rachůnek (1979–2011), Czech ice hockey player
- Tomáš Rachůnek (born 1991), Czech ice hockey player
- Steve Rachunok (1916–2002), American baseball player
