= Tomáš Žižka =

Czech ice hockey player

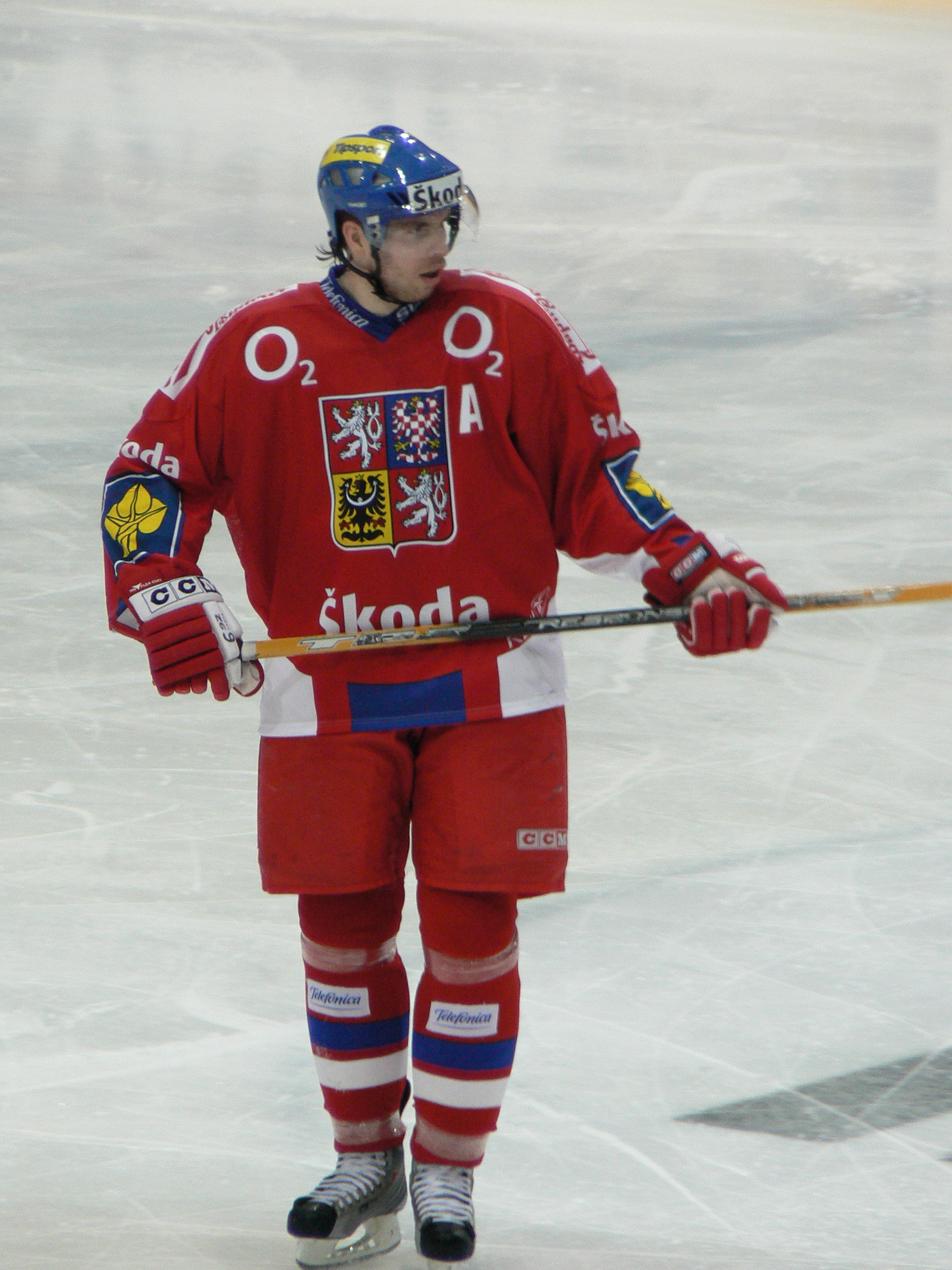
- Žižka with the Czech national team in February 2008
- Born: October 10, 1979 (age 46) Šternberk, Czechoslovakia
- Height: 6 ft 1 in (185 cm)
- Weight: 198 lb (90 kg; 14 st 2 lb)
- Position: Defense
- Shoots: Left
- CZE-3 team Former teams: Hokej Vyškov; HC Zlín; HC Kometa Brno; Slavia Praha; HC Spartak Moscow; Los Angeles Kings
- National team: Czech Republic
- NHL draft: 163rd overall, 1998; Los Angeles Kings
- Playing career: 1997–present

Tomáš Žižka (born October 10, 1979) is a Czech professional ice hockey defenseman currently playing for Hokej Vyškov of the 2nd Czech Republic Hockey League, the third-tier league in the Czech Republic. He previously played 25 games in the National Hockey League with the Los Angeles Kings during the 2002–03 and 2003–04 seasons. The rest of his career, which began in 1997, has mainly been spent in the Czech Extraliga.

== Playing career ==
Žižka was drafted 163rd overall by the Los Angeles Kings in the 1998 NHL entry draft. He played 25 career NHL games, scoring 2 goals and 6 assists for 8 points.

== Career statistics ==
=== Regular season and playoffs ===
			Regular season					Playoffs
Season	Team	League	GP	G	A	Pts	PIM	GP	G	A	Pts	PIM
1994–95	HC Zlín U18	CZE U18	39	1	10	11	—	—	—	—	—	—
1995–96	HC Zlín U18	CZE U18	47	2	8	10	—	—	—	—	—	—
1996–97	HC Zlín U20	CZE U20	14	1	0	1	—	—	—	—	—	—
1997–98	HC Zlín U20	CZE U20	11	3	4	7	—	—	—	—	—	—
1997–98	HC Zlín	CZE	32	0	3	3	2	—	—	—	—	—
1998–99	HC Zlín U20	CZE U20	—	—	—	—	—	—	—	—	—	—
1998–99	HC Zlín	CZE	45	3	8	11	14	11	2	1	3	4
1999–00	HC Zlín U20	CZE U20	1	0	0	0	4	—	—	—	—	—
1999–00	HC Zlín	CZE	46	4	6	10	30	4	1	0	1	4
2000–01	HC Zlín	CZE	43	2	11	13	16	6	0	0	0	6
2001–02	Manchester Monarchs	AHL	58	4	17	21	22	4	1	0	1	14
2002–03	Los Angeles Kings	NHL	10	0	3	3	4	—	—	—	—	—
2002–03	Manchester Monarchs	AHL	61	13	30	43	50	3	0	2	2	2
2003–04	Los Angeles Kings	NHL	15	2	3	5	12	—	—	—	—	—
2003–04	Manchester Monarchs	AHL	58	4	24	28	31	5	0	3	3	10
2004–05	Spartak Moscow	RSL	23	0	3	3	32	—	—	—	—	—
2004–05	Slavia Praha	CZE	26	2	4	6	26	2	0	0	0	2
2005–06	Slavia Praha	CZE	52	6	9	15	48	14	1	2	3	31
2006–07	Slavia Praha	CZE	38	4	5	9	54	6	1	2	3	10
2007–08	Slavia Praha	CZE	48	5	9	14	76	19	2	1	3	28
2008–09	Slavia Praha	CZE	49	2	9	11	38	18	0	1	1	16
2009–10	Slavia Praha	CZE	52	5	9	14	76	16	0	3	3	28
2010–11	Slavia Praha	CZE	51	5	7	12	54	19	2	4	6	40
2011–12	HC Kometa Brno	CZE	50	8	11	19	80	20	1	6	7	20
2012–13	HC Kometa Brno	CZE	52	5	12	17	60	—	—	—	—	—
2013–14	HC Kometa Brno	CZE	47	4	11	15	40	18	2	4	6	14
2014–15	HC Zlín	CZE	51	6	17	23	100	7	1	3	4	18
2015–16	HC Zlín	CZE	50	3	10	13	44	10	0	7	7	16
2016–17	HC Zlín	CZE	52	1	3	4	36	—	—	—	—	—
2017–18	HC Zlín	CZE	46	2	6	8	34	4	0	1	1	0
2018–19	HC Zlín	CZE	41	3	7	10	26	1	0	0	0	0
2019–20	HC Zlín	CZE	38	6	3	9	18	2	1	0	1	0
2020–21	HC Zlín	CZE	42	0	6	6	34	—	—	—	—	—
2021–22	HC Zlín	CZE	38	1	2	3	39	—	—	—	—	—
CZE totals			989	77	168	245	945	187	17	38	55	239
NHL totals			25	2	6	8	16	—	—	—	—	—

=== International ===
Year	Team	Event	GP	G	A	Pts	PIM
1999	Czech Republic	WJC	6	0	3	3	2
Junior totals			6	0	3	3	2
