= 2024–25 Maxa liga season =

- League: Maxa liga
- Sport: Ice hockey
- Duration: 14 September 2024 – 11 April 2025
- Games: Regular season: 364; Postseason: 39
- Teams: 14

Regular season
- Season champions: VHK Vsetín
- Runners-up: RI Okna Berani Zlín
- Promoted to Czech Extraliga: none
- Relegated to 2 Liga: LHK Jestřábi Prostějov

Playoffs
- Finals champions: HC Dukla Jihlava
- Runners-up: RI Okna Berani Zlín

1st Czech Republic Hockey League seasons
- ← 2023–24 2025–26 →

The 2024–25 Maxa liga season was the 32nd season of the second Czech league and 1st since discontinuing their sponsorship with Chance Sports Betting. The regular season ran from 14 September 2024 to 1 March 2025. VHK Vsetín finished atop the standings. The postseason ran from 4 March to 11 April 2025. HC Dukla Jihlava defeated the RI Okna Berani Zlín 4 games to 2 for the league championship.

== Membership changes ==
- Orli Znojmo was relegated to 2 Liga with Piráti Chomutov taking their place.

== Teams ==
2024–25 Maxa liga teams.

Team	City	Region	Arena	Coach
Piráti Chomutov	Chomutov	Ústí nad Labem	Rocknet aréna	(Czech Republic) Martin Pešout
HC Frýdek-Místek	Frýdek-Místek	Moravia-Silesia	Hala Polárka	(Slovakia) Martin Hrnčár
HC Dukla Jihlava	Jihlava	Vysočina	CZ LOKO Arena	(Czech Republic) Viktor Ujčík
SC Marimex Kolín	Kolín	Central Bohemia	Zimní stadion Kolín	(Czech Republic) Petr Martínek
HC Stadion Litoměřice	Litoměřice	Ústí nad Labem	Kalich Aréna	(Czech Republic) Jaroslav Nedvěd
HC Dynamo Pardubice B	Pardubice	Pardubice	Enteria Arena	(Czech Republic) Tomáš Jirků
HC RT Torax Poruba	Poruba	Moravia-Silesia	RT Torax Arena	(Czech Republic) Jiří Režnar, (Czech Republic) Rudolf Roháček
HC Slavia Praha	Prague	Prague	Zimní stadion Eden	(Czech Republic) Aleš Totter
HC ZUBR Přerov	Přerov	Olomouc	MEO Arena	(Czech Republic) Michal Mikeska
LHK Jestřábi Prostějov	Prostějov	Olomouc	Zimní stadion Prostějov	(Czech Republic) Martin Janeček, (Czech Republic) Ivo Peštuka, (Czech Republic) Miloš Říha
HC Baník Sokolov	Sokolov	Karlovy Vary	Zimní stadion Sokolov	(Czech Republic) Tomáš Mariška
SK Horácká Slavia Třebíč	Třebíč	Vysočina	Zimní stadion Třebíč	(Czech Republic) David Dolníček
VHK ROBE Vsetín	Vsetín	Zlín	Zimní stadion Na Lapači	(Czech Republic) Jiri Weintritt
RI Okna Berani Zlín	Zlín	Zlín	Trinity Bank Arena Luďka Čajky	(Slovakia) Ján Pardavý

== Standings ==
=== Regular season ===
Pos	Team	Pld	W	OTW	OTL	L	GF	GA	GD	Pts	Qualification
1	VHK ROBE Vsetín	52	31	3	9	9	186	138	+48	108	Qualified to quarterfinals
2	RI Okna Berani Zlín	52	27	6	4	15	144	114	+30	97	Qualified to quarterfinals
3	SK Horácká Slavia Třebíč	52	24	9	5	14	150	124	+26	95	Qualified to quarterfinals
4	HC RT Torax Poruba	52	26	6	5	15	183	130	+53	95	Qualified to quarterfinals
5	HC Stadion Litoměřice	52	25	4	7	16	154	121	+33	90	Qualified to quarterfinals
6	HC Dukla Jihlava	52	23	6	5	18	155	136	+19	86	Qualified to quarterfinals
7	HC Baník Sokolov	52	18	8	4	22	135	155	−20	74	Qualified to eighthfinals
8	HC ZUBR Přerov	52	19	4	6	23	119	137	−18	71	Qualified to eighthfinals
9	Piráti Chomutov	52	18	5	7	22	130	151	−21	71	Qualified to eighthfinals
10	HC Dynamo Pardubice B	52	17	7	5	23	138	156	−18	70	Qualified to eighthfinals
11	HC Slavia Praha	52	16	7	7	22	127	150	−23	69	
12	SC Marimex Kolín	52	16	3	6	27	131	157	−26	60	
13	HC Frýdek-Místek	52	9	11	7	25	123	154	−31	56	
14	LHK Jestřábi Prostějov	52	13	3	5	31	117	169	−52	50	Qualified to relegation

Source: Standings
Rules for classification: 1) Points; 2) Head-to-head points.

=== Statistics ===
==== Scoring leaders ====
Player	Team	Pos	GP	G	A	Pts	PIM
(Czech Republic) Pavel Klhůfek	VHK ROBE Vsetín	C/LW	49	27	28	55	34
(Czech Republic) Martin Dočekal	SK Horácká Slavia Třebíč	LW	51	21	31	52	6
(Czech Republic) Luboš Rob	VHK ROBE Vsetín	LW/RW	50	16	32	48	26
(Czech Republic) Tomáš Čachotský	HC Dukla Jihlava	LW	45	12	34	46	16
(Czech Republic) Lukáš Válek	RI Okna Berani Zlín	LW	52	15	30	45	30
(Czech Republic) Tomáš Šoustal	HC RT Torax Poruba	C/RW	48	17	26	43	58
(Czech Republic) Vojtěch Střondala	HC RT Torax Poruba	C	51	14	29	43	57
(Latvia) Frenks Razgals	HC RT Torax Poruba	LW/RW	49	21	21	42	37
(Czech Republic) Viktor Hübl	Piráti Chomutov	C	50	17	24	41	36
(Czech Republic) Filip Kuťák	HC Stadion Litoměřice	C	51	17	24	41	18
(Czech Republic) Kryštof Ouřada	SC Marimex Kolín	RW	51	16	25	41	6
(Czech Republic) Matěj Psota	SK Horácká Slavia Třebíč	RW	44	15	26	41	4

==== Leading goaltenders ====
The following goaltenders led the league in goals against average, provided that they have played at least 1/3 of their team's minutes.

Player	Team	GP	TOI	W	L	GA	SO	SV%	GAA
(Czech Republic) Daniel Huf	RI Okna Berani Zlín	33	1921	22	11	59	3	.930	1.84
(Czech Republic) Martin Michajlov	HC Stadion Litoměřice	36	2130	24	11	73	2	.928	2.06
(Czech Republic) Jan Brož	SK Horácká Slavia Třebíč	36	2096	23	11	76	1	.921	2.18
(Czech Republic) Vojtěch Mokry	HC ZUBR Přerov	41	2461	20	21	90	2	.931	2.19
(Czech Republic) Adam Beran	HC Dukla Jihlava	30	1769	20	10	65	4	.917	2.20

== Playoffs ==
=== Bracket ===
Eighthfinals (best-of-3)
7	HC Baník Sokolov	1	1	-
10	HC Dynamo Pardubice B	2*	3	-
8	HC ZUBR Přerov	0	0	-
9	Piráti Chomutov	3	2	-

Quarterfinals (best-of-7)
1	VHK ROBE Vsetín	7	4	4	-	-
10	HC Dynamo Pardubice B	0	1	1	-	-
2	RI Okna Berani Zlín	2**	1*	0	4	-
9	Piráti Chomutov	1	0	1**	1	-
3	SK Horácká Slavia Třebíč	2	2	1	3	-
6	HC Dukla Jihlava	1	4	2	7	-
4	HC RT Torax Poruba	3	1	4	3	2
5	HC Stadion Litoměřice	4	2*	2	2	5

Semifinals (best-of-7)
1	VHK ROBE Vsetín	0	2	5	0	3	4	1
6	HC Dukla Jihlava	2	1	0	3	6	1	3
(Pairings are re-seeded after the first and second round)
2	RI Okna Berani Zlín	3	1	1	6	4	5	-
5	HC Stadion Litoměřice	0	4	5	2	1	1	-

Championship (best-of-7)
6	HC Dukla Jihlava	3	3	1*	2	1	4	-
2	RI Okna Berani Zlín	1	4*	0	1	2	1	-

Note: * denotes overtime
Note: ** denotes overtime and shootout

== Promotion/relegation ==
Note: League champion, HC Dukla Jihlava, faced the last place team of the Czech Extraliga, HC Olomouc, to determine where the two teams would play. The winner of the best-of-7 series would be members of the Extraliga in 2025–26 while the loser would join Maxa liga.

Placement (best-of-7)
HC Olomouc	2	6	2	3	-	-	-
HC Dukla Jihlava	1	0	1	0	-	-	-
