= List of HC Lev draft picks =

This is a complete list of ice hockey players who were drafted in the Kontinental Hockey League Junior draft by the HC Lev Praha franchise. It includes every player who was drafted, regardless of whether they played for the team. Tomáš Rachůnek became Lev's first junior draft pick during the 2012 KHL Junior Draft.

== Key ==
Abbreviations for statistical columns
Pos	Position	GP	Games played
G	Goals	A	Assists
Pts	Points	PIM	Penalties in minutes
GAA	Goals against average	W	Wins
L	Losses	SV%	Save percentage
OT	Overtime or Shootout losses	–	Does not apply

Position abbreviations
G	Goaltender
D	Defenseman
LW	Left wing
C	Center
RW	Right wing
F	Forward

== Draft picks ==
Statistics are complete as of the 2011–12 KHL season and show each player's career regular season totals in the KHL. Wins, losses, ties, overtime losses and goals against average apply to goaltenders and are used only for players at that position. A player listed with a dash under the games played column has not played in the KHL.

Year	Round	Pick	Player	Nationality	Pos	GP	G	A	Pts	PIM	W	L	OT	SV%	GAA
2012	1	31	Tomáš Rachůnek	Czech Republic	LW										
2012	2	69	Vojtech Mozik	Czech Republic	D										
2012	3	105	Lukas Zejdl	Czech Republic	RW										
2012	4	132	Jan Kostalek	Czech Republic	D										
2012	5	164	Roman Will	Czech Republic	G										

== See also ==
- 2012 KHL Junior Draft
