= 2000–01 Czech Extraliga season =

2000–01 Czech Extraliga
- League: Czech Extraliga
- Sport: Ice hockey
- Duration: September 2000 – April 2001
- TV partner: Česká televize

Regular season
- Presidential Cup: HC Slovnaft Vsetín

Playoffs

Finals
- Champions: HC Slovnaft Vsetín
- Runners-up: HC Sparta Praha

Czech Extraliga seasons
- ← 1999–2000 2001–02 →

The 2000–01 Czech Extraliga season was the eighth season of the Czech Extraliga since its creation after the breakup of Czechoslovakia and the Czechoslovak First Ice Hockey League in 1993. HC Slovnaft Vsetín beat HC Sparta Praha in the finals.

== Rule changes ==
This season introduced 4-on-4 overtime for games without a winner after 60 minutes. For the first time, three points for a win were awarded for regulation wins; overtime wins scored 2 points.

== Standings ==
Place	Team	GP	W	OTW	T	L	OTL	Goals	Pts
1.	HC Slovnaft Vsetín	52	30	2	4	15	1	149:115	99
2.	HC Excalibur Znojemští Orli	52	21	6	5	18	2	151:139	82
3.	HC IPB Pojišťovna Pardubice	52	22	2	8	16	4	156:135	82
4.	HC Chemopetrol Litvínov	52	22	3	7	18	2	141:130	81
5.	HC Sparta Prag	52	22	3	2	19	6	146:139	80
6.	HC Vítkovice	52	22	2	10	16	3	132:126	80
7.	HC Slavia Prag	52	21	4	6	19	2	151:134	79
8.	HC Continental Zlín	52	22	2	7	19	2	143:131	79
9.	HC Oceláři Třinec	52	21	3	4	22	2	164:163	75
10.	HC Keramika Plzeň	52	20	3	6	21	2	150:144	74
11.	HC České Budějovice	52	21	1	5	21	5	156:154	72
12.	HC Vagnerplast Kladno	52	15	5	2	25	5	127:176	62
13.	HC Femax Havířov	52	17	3	3	27	2	141:180	62
14.	HC Becherovka Karlovy Vary	52	13	2	3	41	3	117:158	49

== Playoffs ==
=== Quarterfinal ===
- HC Slovnaft Vsetín - HC Continental Zlín 4:3 (3:1,1:1,0:1)
- HC Slovnaft Vsetín - HC Continental Zlín 1:2 PP (0:1,1:0,0:0,0:1)
- HC Continental Zlín - HC Slovnaft Vsetín 3:5 (1:0,2:2,0:3)
- HC Continental Zlín - HC Slovnaft Vsetín 1:2 (0:0,0:1,1:1)
- HC Slovnaft Vsetín - HC Continental Zlín 0:2 (0:0,0:0,0:2)
- HC Continental Zlín - HC Slovnaft Vsetín 2:3 PP (1:2,1:0,0:0,0:1)
- HC Excalibur Znojemští Orli - HC Slavia Praha 5:2 (1:1,1:1,3:0)
- HC Excalibur Znojemští Orli - HC Slavia Praha 4:0 (1:0,1:0,2:0)
- HC Slavia Praha - HC Excalibur Znojemští Orli 6:0 (3:0,2:0,1:0)
- HC Slavia Praha - HC Excalibur Znojemští Orli 1:0 (0:0,1:0,0:0)
- HC Excalibur Znojemští Orli - HC Slavia Praha 0:3 (0:1,0:1,0:1)
- HC Slavia Praha - HC Excalibur Znojemští Orli 2:3 (1:2,1:1,0:0)
- HC Excalibur Znojemští Orli - HC Slavia Praha 1:3 (0:1,0:1,1:1)
- HC IPB Pojišťovna Pardubice - HC Vítkovice 3:4 (1:1,1:3,1:0)
- HC IPB Pojišťovna Pardubice - HC Vítkovice 6:3 (4:3,1:0,1:0)
- HC Vítkovice - HC IPB Pojišťovna Pardubice 1:4 (1:1,0:0,0:3)
- HC Vítkovice - HC IPB Pojišťovna Pardubice 4:3 (3:1,0:1,1:1)
- HC IPB Pojišťovna Pardubice - HC Vítkovice 6:1 (3:1,3:0,0:0)
- HC Vítkovice - HC IPB Pojišťovna Pardubice 2:1 PP (0:0,0:1,1:0,1:0)
- HC IPB Pojišťovna Pardubice - HC Vítkovice 3:4 (1:2,1:1,1:1)
- HC Chemopetrol Litvínov - HC Sparta Praha 4:5 SN (1:1,0:1,3:2,0:0)
- HC Chemopetrol Litvínov - HC Sparta Praha 3:1 (2:0,1:1,0:0)
- HC Sparta Praha - HC Chemopetrol Litvínov 1:0 (0:0,0:0,1:0)
- HC Sparta Praha - HC Chemopetrol Litvínov 2:3 SN (0:0,2:1,0:1,0:0)
- HC Chemopetrol Litvínov - HC Sparta Praha 1:4 (0:2,0:1,1:1)
- HC Sparta Praha - HC Chemopetrol Litvínov 3:0 (2:0,0:0,1:0)

=== Semifinal ===
- HC Slovnaft Vsetín - HC Slavia Praha 4:0 (0:0,2:0,2:0)
- HC Slovnaft Vsetín - HC Slavia Praha 3:2 (1:0,1:1,1:1)
- HC Slavia Praha - HC Slovnaft Vsetín 4:2 (0:2,2:0,2:0)
- HC Slavia Praha - HC Slovnaft Vsetín 5:6 PP (2:0,2:2,1:3,0:1)
- HC Sparta Praha - HC Vítkovice 3:2 (0:1,2:1,1:0)
- HC Sparta Praha - HC Vítkovice 3:1 (1:0,2:0,0:1)
- HC Vítkovice - HC Sparta Praha 2:3 (1:1,0:0,1:2)

=== Final ===
- HC Slovnaft Vsetín - HC Sparta Praha 3–2, 3–4, 6–3, 4-1

HC Slovnaft Vsetín is 2000-01 Czech Extraliga champion.

== Relegation ==
- HC Becherovka Karlovy Vary - KLH Chomutov 3:2 (2:0,1:0,0:2)
- HC Becherovka Karlovy Vary - KLH Chomutov 5:1 (3:1,0:0,2:0)
- KLH Chomutov - HC Becherovka Karlovy Vary 2:0 (1:0,1:0,0:0)
- KLH Chomutov - HC Becherovka Karlovy Vary 5:4 SN (1:1,2:2,1:1,0:0)
- HC Becherovka Karlovy Vary - KLH Chomutov 5:1 (0:1,2:0,3:0)
- KLH Chomutov - HC Becherovka Karlovy Vary 2:5 (1:1,0:3,1:1)
