= 2001–02 Czech Extraliga season =

2001–02 Czech Extraliga
- League: Czech Extraliga
- Sport: Ice hockey
- Duration: September 2001 – April 2002
- TV partner(s): Česká televize

Regular season
- Presidential Cup: HC Sparta Praha

Playoffs

Finals
- Champions: HC Sparta Praha
- Runners-up: HC Vítkovice

Czech Extraliga seasons
- ← 2000–01 2002–03 →

The 2001–02 Czech Extraliga season was the ninth season of the Czech Extraliga since its creation after the breakup of Czechoslovakia and the Czechoslovak First Ice Hockey League in 1993. HC Sparta Praha won the title, defeating HC Vítkovice in the finals.

== Standings ==
Place	Team	GP	W	OTW	T	L	OTL	Goals	Pts
1.	HC Sparta Praha	52	28	4	8	9	3	196:132	103
2.	HC Continental Zlín	52	25	5	4	15	3	189:154	92
3.	HC IPB Pojišťovna Pardubice	52	27	1	6	16	2	151:134	91
4.	HC Keramika Plzeň	52	26	1	6	18	1	155:146	87
5.	HC Vítkovice	52	23	5	4	16	4	158:132	87
6.	HC Slavia Praha	52	22	4	5	15	6	152:125	87
7.	HC JME Znojemští Orli	52	22	5	4	18	3	153:140	83
8.	HC Oceláři Třinec	52	23	2	2	21	4	155:165	79
9.	HC Vsetín	52	16	5	7	22	2	142:162	67
10.	HC Becherovka Karlovy Vary	52	14	6	3	25	4	127:155	61
11.	HC Femax Havířov	52	16	3	2	27	4	161:189	60
12.	HC České Budějovice	52	16	1	5	26	4	133:155	59
13.	HC Chemopetrol Litvínov	52	16	0	3	29	4	120:164	55
14.	HC Vagnerplast Kladno	52	10	4	9	27	2	123:162	49

== Playoffs ==
=== Quarterfinal ===
- HC Sparta Praha - HC Oceláři Třinec 5:1 (1:0,3:0,1:1)
- HC Sparta Praha - HC Oceláři Třinec 6:4 (4:1,1:2,1:1)
- HC Oceláři Třinec - HC Sparta Praha 2:4 (0:1,1:0,1:3)
- HC Oceláři Třinec - HC Sparta Praha 4:3 SN (1:1,2:2,0:0,0:0)
- HC Sparta Praha - HC Oceláři Třinec 3:7 (0:3,3:3,0:1)
- HC Oceláři Třinec - HC Sparta Praha 1:4 (1:0,0:0,0:4)
- HC IPB Pojišťovna Pardubice - HC Slavia Praha 2:4 (2:1,0:0,0:3)
- HC IPB Pojišťovna Pardubice - HC Slavia Praha 4:1 (2:0,1:1,1:0)
- HC Slavia Praha - HC IPB Pojišťovna Pardubice 3:2 SN (1:0,0:1,1:1,0:0)
- HC Slavia Praha - HC IPB Pojišťovna Pardubice 1:0 (1:0,0:0,0:0)
- HC IPB Pojišťovna Pardubice - HC Slavia Praha 5:2 (1:0,4:2,0:0)
- HC Slavia Praha - HC IPB Pojišťovna Pardubice 3:1 (0:0,1:0,2:1)
- HC Continental Zlín - HC Excalibur Znojemští Orli 3:1 (1:0,1:1,1:0)
- HC Continental Zlín - HC Excalibur Znojemští Orli 1:2 (0:0,0:1,1:1)
- HC Excalibur Znojemští Orli - HC Continental Zlín 6:4 (4:1,0:1,2:2)
- HC Excalibur Znojemští Orli - HC Continental Zlín 5:3 (1:0,1:3,3:0)
- HC Continental Zlín - HC Excalibur Znojemští Orli 6:2 (3:0,1:1,2:1)
- HC Excalibur Znojemští Orli - HC Continental Zlín 2:5 (0:1,0:2,2:2)
- HC Continental Zlín - HC Excalibur Znojemští Orli 4:3 PP (2:2,1:1,0:0,1:0)
- HC Keramika Plzeň - HC Vítkovice 2:1 (0:0,0:1,2:0)
- HC Keramika Plzeň - HC Vítkovice 1:4 (1:1,0:2,0:1)
- HC Vítkovice - HC Keramika Plzeň 2:3 (1:0,1:3,0:0)
- HC Vítkovice - HC Keramika Plzeň 9:1 (3:0,4:0,2:1)
- HC Keramika Plzeň - HC Vítkovice 2:5 (0:1,2:2,0:2)
- HC Vítkovice - HC Keramika Plzeň 4:2 (1:1,1:0,2:1)

=== Semifinal ===
- HC Sparta Praha - HC Slavia Praha 4:1 (1:0,0:1,3:0)
- HC Slavia Praha - HC Sparta Praha 1:2 (1:1,0:0,0:1)
- HC Sparta Praha - HC Slavia Praha 5:1 (4:0,1:0,0:1)
- HC Continental Zlín - HC Vítkovice 4:1 (2:0,1:0,1:1)
- HC Vítkovice - HC Continental Zlín 5:1 (4:1,1:0,0:0)
- HC Continental Zlín - HC Vítkovice 1:2 (1:0,0:0,0:2)
- HC Vítkovice - HC Continental Zlín 5:2 (0:0,3:0,2:2)

=== Final ===
- HC Sparta Praha - HC Vítkovice 2–3, 3–2, 7–0, 4-1

HC Sparta Praha is the Czech champion for 2001–02.

== Relegation ==
- HC Vagnerplast Kladno - HC Bílí Tygři Liberec 1:4
- HC Vagnerplast Kladno - HC Bílí Tygři Liberec 1:4 (0:2,1:0,0:2)
- HC Vagnerplast Kladno - HC Bílí Tygři Liberec 2:5 (0:2,1:1,1:2)
- HC Bílí Tygři Liberec - HC Vagnerplast Kladno 2:4 (1:0,0:2,1:2)
- HC Bílí Tygři Liberec - HC Vagnerplast Kladno 3:0 (1:0,1:0,1:0)
- HC Vagnerplast Kladno - HC Bílí Tygři Liberec 1:2 (0:0,1:1,0:1)
