= Kubiš =

Kubiš (feminine: Kubišová) is a Czech and Slovak surname, derived from the given name Kuba, which is a variant of Jakub. An alternative spelling is Kubis and a similar surname is Kubisz. The name may refer to:

- Heinrich Kubis (1888–1979), German flight attendant
- Jan Kubiš (1913–1942), Czech soldier
- Ján Kubiš (born 1952), Slovak diplomat
- Lukáš Kubiš (born 2000), Slovak racing cyclist
- Marta Kubišová (born 1942), Czech singer
- Pavel Kubiš (born 1985), Czech ice hockey player
- Sven Kubis (born 1975), German footballer
- Tom Kubis (born 1951), American musician
