= TJ Gottwaldov =

TJ Gottwaldov is the outdated name of two Czech sport clubs from Zlín:

- FC Fastav Zlín - football club
- RI OKNA Zlín - ice hockey team
