= Kubisz =

Kubisz is a Polish surname, derived from the given name Kuba, which is a variant of Jakub. A similar surname is Kubiš. The name may refer to:

- Jan Kubisz (1848–1929), Polish educator and writer
- Józef Kubisz (1885–1940), Polish diplomat
- Marek Kubisz (born 1974), Polish footballer
- Paweł Kubisz (1907–1968), Polish poet
