= Nikita Zadorov =

Russian ice hockey player (born 1995)

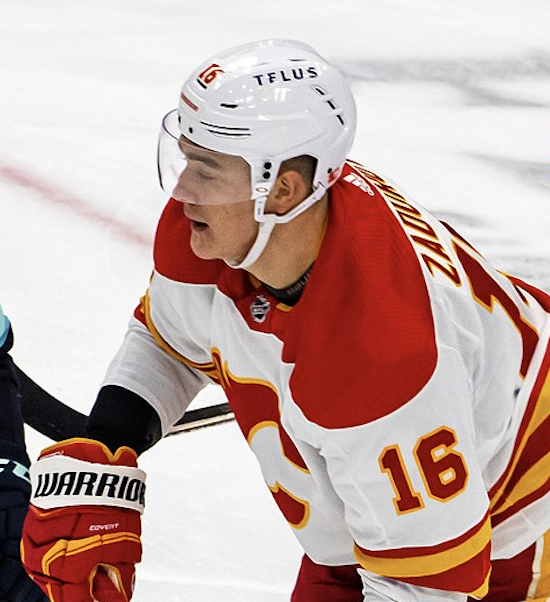
- Zadorov with the Calgary Flames in 2023
- Born: 16 April 1995 (age 31) Moscow, Russia
- Height: 6 ft 7 in (201 cm)
- Weight: 244 lb (111 kg; 17 st 6 lb)
- Position: Defence
- Shoots: Left
- NHL team Former teams: Boston Bruins; Buffalo Sabres; Colorado Avalanche; Chicago Blackhawks; Calgary Flames; Vancouver Canucks
- National team: Russia
- NHL draft: 16th overall, 2013; Buffalo Sabres
- Playing career: 2012–present

Nikita Sergeyevich Zadorov (Russian: Никита Сергеевич Задоров; born 16 April 1995) is a Russian professional ice hockey player who is a defenceman for the Boston Bruins of the National Hockey League (NHL). He was originally drafted by the Buffalo Sabres in the first round, 16th overall, in the 2013 NHL entry draft.

== Playing career ==
=== Junior ===
Zadorov played in the 2008 Quebec International Pee-Wee Hockey Tournament with the HC CSKA Moscow youth team. He played in the top minor hockey level with his hometown team in Moscow, Krasnaya Armiya, in the 2011–12 season. Showing unique agility and skating prowess for a formidable frame, Zadorov scored 6 points in 42 games. He was selected by affiliate Kontinental Hockey League (KHL) club CSKA Moscow in the first round, fourth overall, of the 2012 KHL Junior Draft. However, with an impressive performance with the junior national U17 team in Windsor, Ontario, and stating his intention to pursue a career in North America in order to be selected in the NHL draft, London Knights general manager Mark Hunter traded up with the Peterborough Petes in the 2012 CHL Import Draft to select Zadorov ninth overall.

After agreeing to a contract with the Knights, Zadorov began his major junior career in the Ontario Hockey League (OHL) in the 2012–13 season, joining fellow Russian Vladislav Namestnikov. After adapting to the differing style and dimensions of the North American game, Zadorov assumed a top pairing role and led All-Rookie defencemen in plus–minus with +33, and finishing second in scoring with 6 goals and 25 points in 63 games. Earning a roster spot in the 2013 CHL Top Prospects Game, Zadorov helped the Knights claim the OHL championship to advance to the Memorial Cup. As he was selected to the OHL First-All Rookie Team, he scored the game-winner in the opening game against the Western Hockey League's Saskatoon Blades before losing in the semi-finals. Zadorov's impressive season was noted as he was selected with the Buffalo Sabres's second first-round pick, 16th overall, in the 2013 NHL entry draft.

=== Buffalo Sabres ===
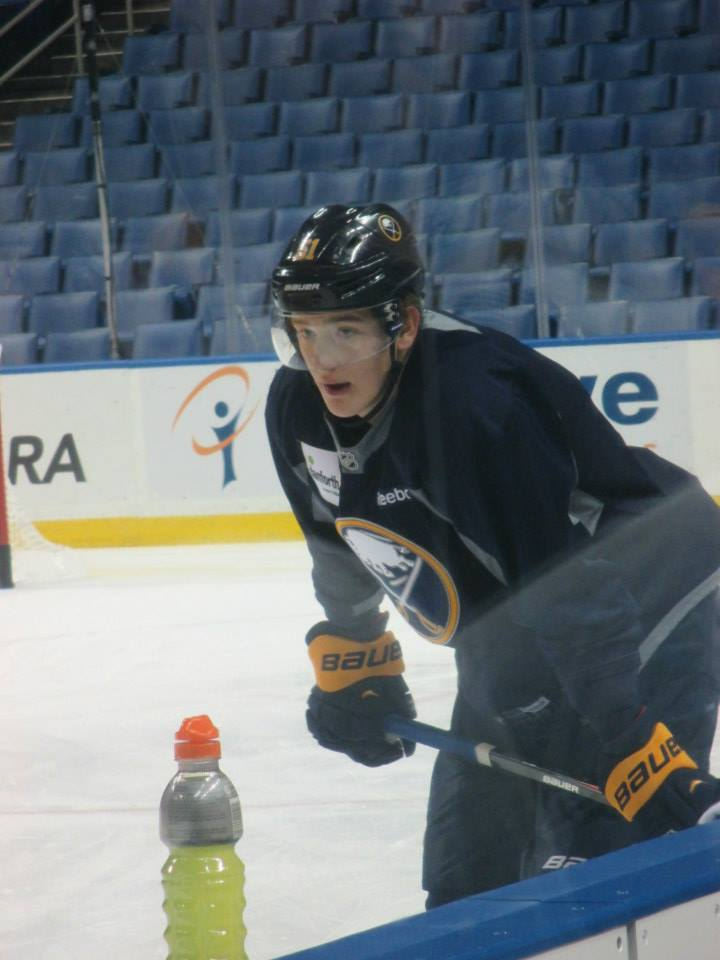
Zadorov with the Buffalo Sabres in 2013.

Zadorov attended his first rookie and NHL training camp and after his third pre-season contest he was signed by the Sabres to a three-year, entry-level contract on 26 September 2013. Under the assessment of head coach Ron Rolston, he made the Sabres' opening night roster to begin the 2013–14 season. Zadorov sat out the first ten games before he made his NHL debut in a 4–2 defeat to the Colorado Avalanche on 19 October. In just his second game, against the Boston Bruins on 23 October, Zadorov scored on his first shot in the NHL, against Chad Johnson. In so doing, he became the youngest Sabres defenceman in franchise history to achieve the feat.

With the Sabres cleaning out the front office and coaching staff, and with an imperative to rely less on the youth from new head coach Ted Nolan, on 19 November, Zadorov was returned to junior with the London Knights after seven NHL games played. He played out the remainder of the season with the Knights, assuming a top-pairing role in surpassing his rookie season totals in points (30) in half the number of games (36), earning a selection to the OHL Second All-Star Team.

Despite a benching during the rookie pre-season tournament in Traverse City, Michigan, Zadorov rebounded to have a strong training camp to make the Sabres' opening-night roster in the 2014–15 season as a permanent addition to the blueline. He initially only saw limited playing time as a rotational option to the third-pairing under Ted Nolan and was primarily on the team for practice only (he was not yet eligible for the American Hockey League and a tie-up involving Zadorov's KHL rights prevented him from being returned to juniors). Zadorov's playing time soon increased in the season as the team's coaching staff decided to keep Zadorov regardless of his junior situation. In developing a shut-down role through his physicality, Zadorov showed offensive glimpses, collecting his first multi-point game in scoring an overtime marker in a 4–3 victory over the Florida Panthers on 13 December 2014. Zadorov also became the youngest Sabres defenceman in history to score an overtime winner. Zadorov showed his youth by suffering two team suspensions over the course of his rookie campaign, after returning late from holiday over the All-Star break and later oversleeping through a team practice. Despite a lowly year for the Sabres, Zadorov led the blueline in plus–minus and finished with 3 goals, 12 assists in 60 games.

=== Colorado Avalanche ===
At the 2015 NHL entry draft, Zadorov was traded as a central piece by the Sabres in a package that also included Mikhail Grigorenko, J. T. Compher and the 31st pick in the draft to the Colorado Avalanche in exchange for Ryan O'Reilly and Jamie McGinn on 26 June 2015. Upon learning about the trade, Zadorov said he was happy since he "knew about this organization...it’s always nice to play for a GM who's actually been here and knows what it’s like for the players when you’re playing and working hard." He began the season with the team but was reassigned to their American Hockey League (AHL) affiliate, the San Antonio Rampage, in order to improve his game. When speaking of the decision, General Manager Joe Sakic said "for a young man in that position, he needs to play a ton and work on his confidence. He’ll go down and play as much as he can and keep learning that way. The only way you can get better is by playing a lot at a young man’s age." At the time of his reassignment, he had recorded two assists in 11 games and been a healthy scratch for four consecutive games. Zadorov remained in the AHL until he earned his first recall on 13 January alongside Chris Bigras after Nate Guenin was placed on waivers. His stay in the NHL was short-lived, however, as he was reassigned to the Rampage on 23 January after Erik Johnson was activated from injured reserve.

The following year, Zadorov made the Avalanche's lineup out of training camp and remained on their roster for the entirety of the 2016–17 season. In February 2017, Zadorov collided with forward Mikko Rantanen during practice and suffered a season-ending fractured ankle injury. At the time of the incident, he had recorded 10 assists and no goals in 56 games. Prior to the start of the 2017–18 season, the Avalanche signed him to a two-year contract extension to remain with the team. He was also medically cleared to play but was late returning for the Avalanche's 2017 training camp due to Visa issues. Entering his third season with the team, Zadorov broke one franchise record and set his own new career-high totals in goals, assists, and points. On 22 March, Zadorov surpassed the previous Avalanche record for most hits in a single game with 15, which was also the third-most hits by an NHL player since 1998–99. By the conclusion of the season, Zadorov led the league with 278 hits and recorded a career-best seven goals, 13 assists, and 20 points.

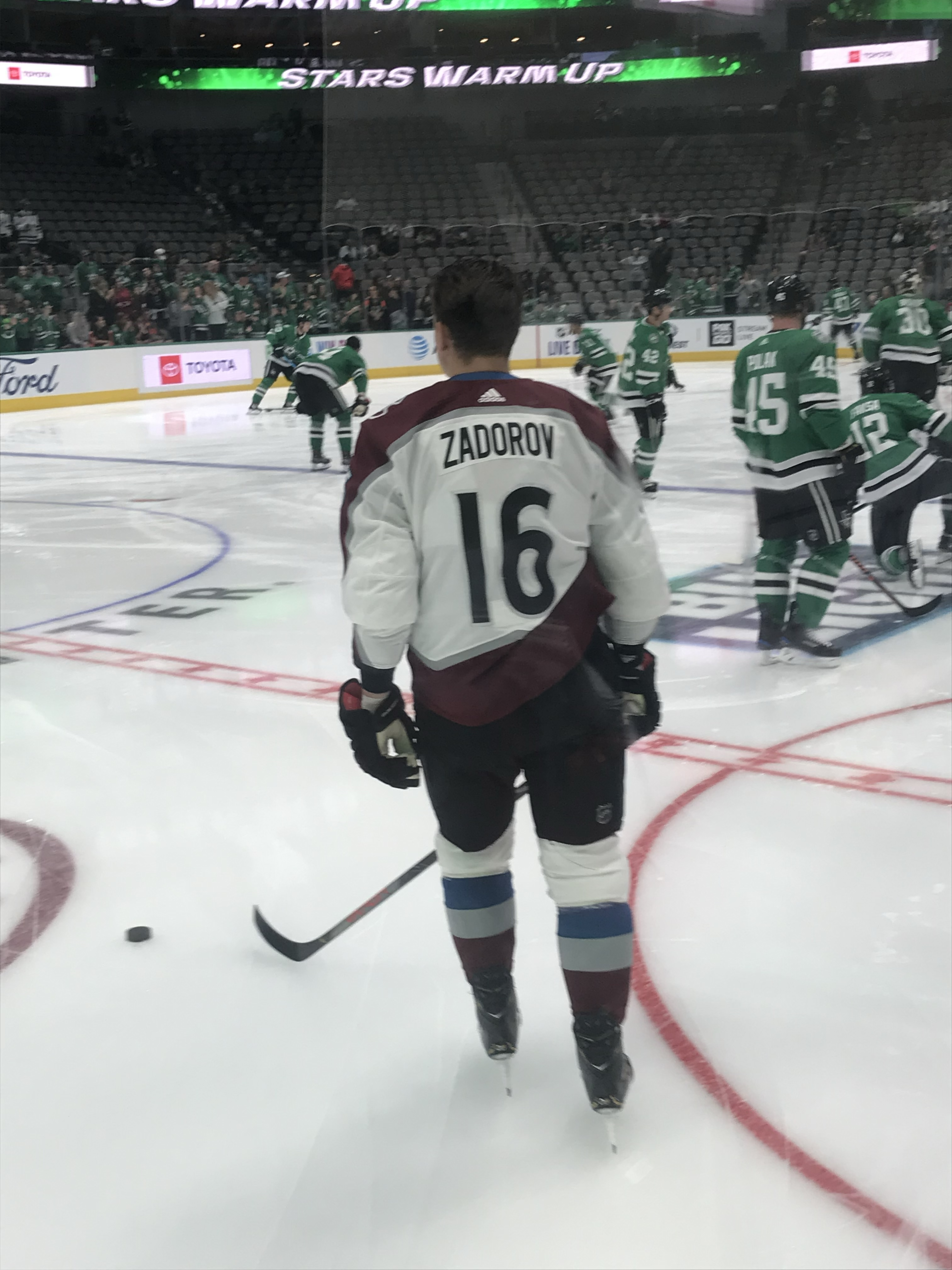
Zadorov with the Avalanche in 2019.

On the heels of his most successful season, Zadorov underwent shoulder surgery in the off-season and was expected to miss participating in the Avalanche's 2018 training camp. In spite of this, Zadorov participated in the Avalanche's training camp wearing a non-contact jersey before being cleared as a full participant in practice on 20 September. He ended his fourth year campaign playing in 70 regular season games and recording seven goals, seven assists, and accumulating 75 penalty minutes. As a result, the Avalanche re-signed Zadorov, who was expected to become a restricted free agent, to a one-year, $3.2 million contract.

With his newest contract signed, Zadorov returned to the Avalanche for their 2019 training camp, although he left on the third day due to an injury. He was listed as day-to-day with a lower-body injury before fully returning to team practice on 24 September, with fellow injured players Pierre-Édouard Bellemare and Erik Johnson. During the shortened 2019–20 season, Zadorov suffered a facial fracture as a result of taking a puck to the face during a game against the Nashville Predators. He returned to the Avalanche's lineup three games later after recovering from surgery to heal his broken jaw. As the Avalanche qualified for the 2020 Stanley Cup playoffs, they faced off against the Arizona Coyotes in the First Round. They beat the Coyotes in five games and Zadorov recorded his first playoff goal in the 7–1 Game 5 win. During their Second Round contests against the Dallas Stars, Zadorov passed Matt Duchene for 74th place on the franchise playoff points list. In the second-round series against the Dallas Stars, despite injuring his arm, Zadorov was able to play through pain, and following the Game 7 defeat to the Stars opted to undergo surgery. He finished the playoffs with 3 goals and 5 points through 15 games. On 8 October 2020, Zadorov as a restricted free agent was tendered a qualifying offer by the Avalanche.

=== Chicago Blackhawks ===
On 10 October 2020, Zadorov's five-year tenure with the Avalanche ended as he was dealt alongside Anton Lindholm to the Chicago Blackhawks in exchange for Brandon Saad and Dennis Gilbert. Prior to the trade, he had accepted his one-year, $3.2 million qualifying offer for the 2020–21 season. In his lone season with the Blackhawks, Zadorov appeared in 55 out of 56 regular season games, registering 1 goal and 8 points from the blueline and was unable to help Chicago return to the playoffs.

=== Calgary Flames ===
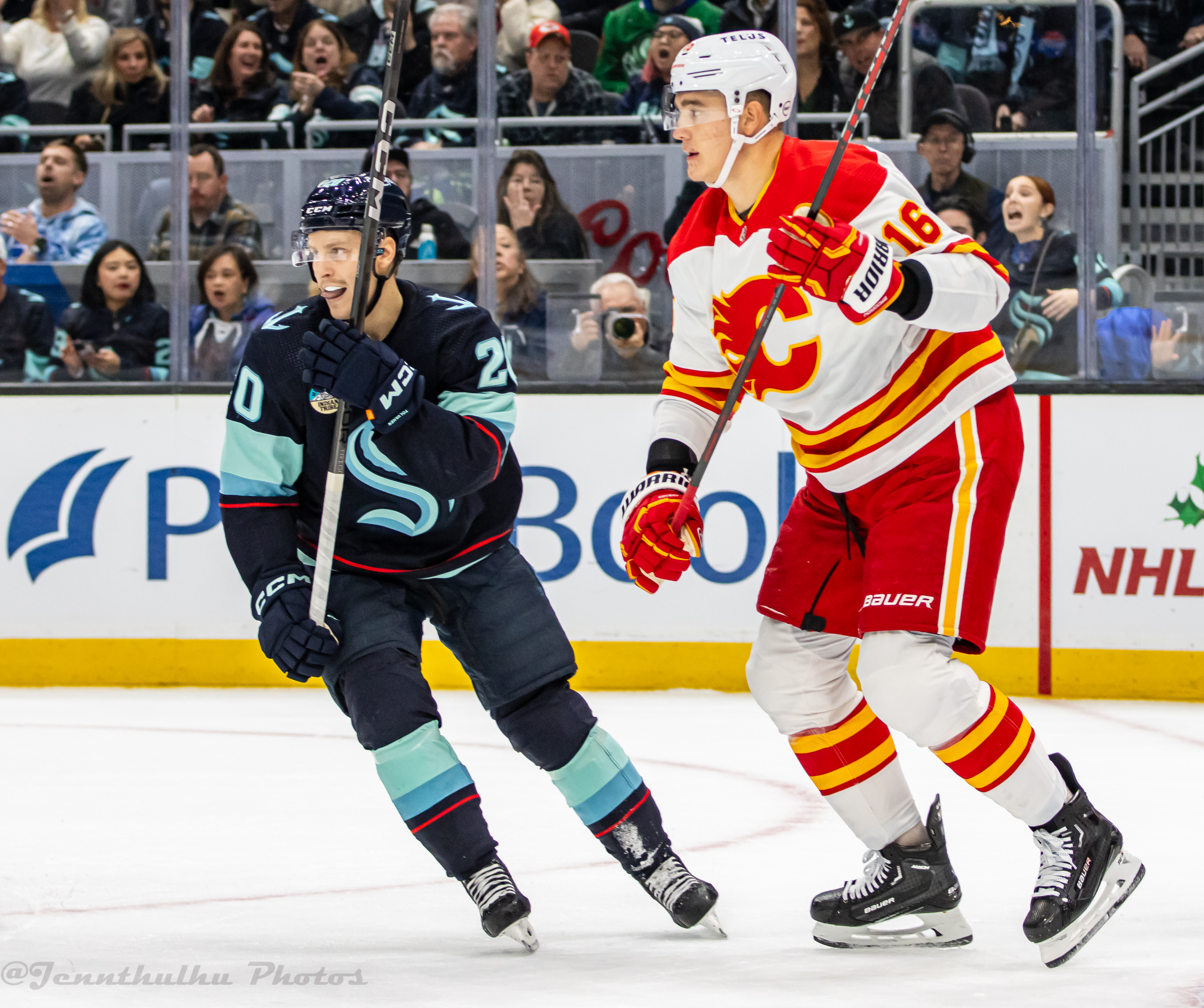
Zadorov as a member of the Calgary Flames with Eeli Tolvanen of the Seattle Kraken in 2023.

On 28 July 2021, Zadorov – an impending restricted free agent – had his negotiation rights traded to the Calgary Flames in exchange for a 2022 third-round pick. On 20 August, he agreed to a one-year, $3.75 million contract, avoiding arbitration. On 12 April 2023, Zadorov recorded his first career NHL hat-trick in a 3–1 win over the San Jose Sharks.

On 10 November 2023, following a loss to the Toronto Maple Leafs, it was reported that Zadorov had requested a trade.

=== Vancouver Canucks ===
Zadorov's trade request was granted on 30 November 2023, when he was traded to the Vancouver Canucks in exchange for a 2024 fifth-round pick and a 2026 third-round pick. He achieved a Gordie Howe hat trick in a 4–3 overtime loss to the Colorado Avalanche at Rogers Arena on 13 March 2024. He earned an assist on an Ilya Mikheyev goal in the first period and scored the Canucks' third goal and fought Josh Manson both in a span of 37 seconds in the second.

=== Boston Bruins ===
Leaving the Canucks as a free agent having been unable to come to terms on an extension at the conclusion of his contract, Zadorov returned to the Eastern Conference in signing a six-year, $30 million deal with the Boston Bruins on 1 July 2024.

Zadorov brought a big body to the Bruins blue line, hoping to provide physicality alongside top Bruins defenseman Charlie McAvoy and Hampus Lindholm. He scored his first points as a Bruin in the second game of the season, with two assists against the Montreal Canadiens. However, Zadorov was shaky early on the Bruins, as he had only scored five assists through the first twenty games, and had taken on a larger role with Lindholm injured. On November 27, 2024, Zadorov scored his first goal as a Bruin against the New York Islanders. As the season went on, Zadorov and the Bruins were become increasingly frustrated, as they were slipped out of playoff contention. By the time the trade deadline passed, both McAvoy and Lindholm were out long-term, and the Bruins traded defenseman Brandon Carlo to the Toronto Maple Leafs, slotting Zadorov in as the top defenseman on a struggling Bruins team. On March 23, 2025, after a 7-2 loss to the Los Angeles Kings, Zadorov drew attention after seemingly making a condescending remark towards Bruins goaltender Jeremy Swayman after Swayman tried to fight Kings goalie Darcy Kuemper at center ice. In response to a reporter asking if the team appreciated the action from Swayman, sticking up for his teammate, Zadorov responded "Is that what that is? Okay. I don't know. No comment." The comment fueled rumours of locker room discontent in general, as well as towards Swayman in particular. A couple days later, Zadorov clarified the comment, saying that he was frustrated after the loss and that it was not meant as a snub towards Swayman, claiming the media blew it out of proportion. Zadorov and the Bruins would end up missing the playoffs, with Zadorov scoring four goals and 18 assists, tying his career high for assists and points. He also led the NHL in penalty minutes in back-to-back years.

== International play ==
Medal record

Ice hockey

Representing Russia

World Championships
Bronze medal – third place	2019 Slovakia	

World Junior Championships
Bronze medal – third place	2014 Malmö	

Following a second-round exit with the Avalanche in the 2019 Stanley Cup playoffs, on 11 May 2019, Zadorov was a late inclusion on the Russian squad to make his senior international debut at the 2019 IIHF World Championships held in Bratislava, Slovakia.

== Personal life ==
Zadorov married his wife in 2015. They have two daughters, who were born in 2017 and 2020, and a son born in 2025. In the offseason, Zadorov resides in Miami, Florida.

In September 2023, Zadorov spoke with Russian journalist Yury Dud about politics, including the Russian invasion of Ukraine, which he opposes. Zadorov said that Russian NHL players had attempted to form a joint statement about the war via Telegram, but failed to reach any agreement. Speaking to Canadian media the day after the interview's release, Zadorov said: "I probably can't go back [to Russia] anytime soon." In May 2024, Iain McIntyre of Sportsnet called Zadorov a "player without a country".

== Career statistics ==
=== Regular season and playoffs ===
Bold indicates led league

			Regular season					Playoffs
Season	Team	League	GP	G	A	Pts	PIM	GP	G	A	Pts	PIM
2011–12	Krasnaya Armiya	MHL	41	2	4	6	63	8	0	0	0	8
2012–13	London Knights	OHL	63	6	19	25	54	20	2	4	6	36
2013–14	London Knights	OHL	36	11	19	30	43	9	4	5	9	12
2013–14	Buffalo Sabres	NHL	7	1	0	1	4	—	—	—	—	—
2014–15	Buffalo Sabres	NHL	60	3	12	15	51	—	—	—	—	—
2015–16	Colorado Avalanche	NHL	22	0	2	2	12	—	—	—	—	—
2015–16	San Antonio Rampage	AHL	52	10	19	29	90	—	—	—	—	—
2016–17	Colorado Avalanche	NHL	56	0	10	10	73	—	—	—	—	—
2017–18	Colorado Avalanche	NHL	77	7	13	20	103	6	1	2	3	32
2018–19	Colorado Avalanche	NHL	70	7	7	14	75	12	0	0	0	24
2019–20	Colorado Avalanche	NHL	64	4	9	13	65	15	3	2	5	18
2020–21	Chicago Blackhawks	NHL	55	1	7	8	36	—	—	—	—	—
2021–22	Calgary Flames	NHL	74	4	18	22	77	12	0	3	3	24
2022–23	Calgary Flames	NHL	82	14	7	21	80	—	—	—	—	—
2023–24	Calgary Flames	NHL	21	1	5	6	23	—	—	—	—	—
2023–24	Vancouver Canucks	NHL	54	5	9	14	102	13	4	4	8	26
2024–25	Boston Bruins	NHL	81	4	18	22	**145**	—	—	—	—	—
2025–26	Boston Bruins	NHL	81	2	20	22	**152**	6	0	1	1	37
NHL totals			804	53	137	190	998	64	8	12	20	161

=== International ===
Year	Team	Event	Result	GP	G	A	Pts	PIM
2012	Russia	U17	1st place, gold medalist(s)	5	0	3	3	8
2012	Russia	IH18	5th	4	0	3	3	0
2012	Russia	U18	5th	6	2	0	2	4
2014	Russia	WJC	3rd place, bronze medalist(s)	7	4	1	5	6
2019	Russia	WC	3rd place, bronze medalist(s)	9	0	1	1	14
2021	ROC	WC	5th	8	0	3	3	2
Junior totals				22	6	7	13	18
Senior totals				17	0	4	4	16

== Awards and honours ==
Award	Year	Ref
OHL
First All-Rookie Team	2013	
CHL Top Prospects Game	2013	
Second All-Star Team	2014	
International
WJC All-Star Team	2014	

Awards and achievements
Preceded by Rasmus Ristolainen	Buffalo Sabres first-round draft pick 2013	Succeeded by Sam Reinhart
