= Matěj Sebera =

Czech ice hockey forward

- Born: May 15, 2001 (age 23); Zlín, Czech Republic
- Height: 5 ft 10 in (178 cm)
- Weight: 157 lb (71 kg; 11 st 3 lb)
- Position: Forward
- Shoots: Left
- Czech Extraliga team (P) Cur. team: PSG Berani Zlín; HC ZUBR Přerov (Chance Liga)
- NHL draft: Eligible, 2021
- Playing career: 2020–present

Matěj Sebera (born May 15, 2001) is a Czech professional ice hockey forward. He is currently playing for HC ZUBR Přerov in the Chance Liga on loan from PSG Berani Zlín.

Sebera has been a member of Zlín's academy since 2014 and made his senior debut for the team during the 2020–21 Czech Extraliga season. In September 2020, Sebera was sent on loan to HC ZUBR Přerov of the Chance Liga. He also had a loan spell with SHK Hodonín of the 2.liga during the 2019–20 season.
