= Pavel Sedláček (ice hockey) =

Czech ice hockey player

- Born: March 19, 1994 (age 31); Zlín, Czech Republic
- Height: 1.83 m (6 ft 0 in)
- Weight: 88 kg (194 lb; 13 st 12 lb)
- Position: Left Wing
- Shoots: Left
- Extraliga team: PSG Berani Zlín
- NHL draft: Undrafted
- Playing career: 2012–present

Pavel Sedláček (born March 19, 1994) is a Czech ice hockey player. He currently plays for PSG Berani Zlín in the 1st Czech Republic Hockey League.
