= Karel Rachůnek =

Czech ice hockey player

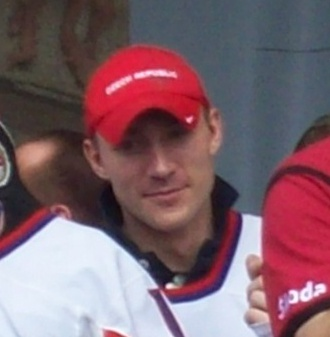
- Rachůnek in 2010
- Born: August 27, 1979 Gottwaldov, Czechoslovakia
- Died: September 7, 2011 (aged 32) Yaroslavl, Russia
- Height: 6 ft 2 in (188 cm)
- Weight: 220 lb (100 kg; 15 st 10 lb)
- Position: Defence
- Shot: Right
- Played for: Ottawa Senators; New York Rangers; New Jersey Devils; Dynamo Moscow; Lokomotiv Yaroslavl
- National team: Czech Republic
- NHL draft: 229th overall, 1997; Ottawa Senators
- Playing career: 1997–2011

Karel Rachůnek (Czech pronunciation: [ˈkarɛl ˈraxuːnɛk], August 27, 1979 – September 7, 2011) was a Czech professional ice hockey player. Rachůnek was the captain of Lokomotiv Yaroslavl of the Kontinental Hockey League (KHL) when the team was decimated in the 2011 Lokomotiv Yaroslavl plane crash. He played eight seasons in North America in the National Hockey League (NHL). Rachůnek was drafted in the ninth round, 229th overall, by the Ottawa Senators in the 1997 NHL entry draft. Rachunek was the brother of Ivan Rachůnek and Tomáš Rachůnek who also played professional ice hockey.

== Playing career ==
=== Early career ===
Rachůnek played his junior hockey with AC ZPS Zlín Jr. of the Czech Junior League from 1995 to 1997. In his rookie season in 1995–96, Rachůnek recorded eight goals and 19 points in 38 games. In his second season with the club in 1996–97, Rachůnek scored two goals and 13 points in 27 games. In the 1997 NHL entry draft, the Ottawa Senators selected Rachůnek in the ninth round, 229th overall.

In 1997–98, Rachůnek moved to Zlín of the Czech Extraliga. In his first season with the club, he scored a goal and three points in 27 games. In 1998–99, Rachůnek improved his offensive numbers to 3 goals and 12 points in 39 games, as well as accumulating 88 penalty minutes, helping Zlín reach the playoffs. In six playoff games, Rachůnek was held pointless.

=== Ottawa Senators ===
Rachůnek made his North American debut with the Grand Rapids Griffins of the International Hockey League (IHL) in 1999–2000, which was the Ottawa Senators' top minor league affiliate. In 62 games with the Griffins, Rachůnek had 6 goals and 26 points, helping Grand Rapids earn a playoff berth. In nine post-season games, Rachůnek had five assists.

Rachůnek also made his National Hockey League debut with the Senators in 1999–2000. Rachůnek made his debut on October 31, 1999, with 14:22 of ice time in the Senators' 6–4 win over the Atlanta Thrashers. He appeared in six games with Ottawa, going pointless.

In 2000–01, Rachůnek made the Senators coming out of training camp. In his rookie season, he appeared in 71 games, scoring 3 goals and 33 points, averaging nearly 21 minutes of ice time per game and helping the Senators into the playoffs. He earned his first NHL point on November 11, 2000, an assist on a goal by Magnus Arvedson in the Senators' 4–3 loss to the Philadelphia Flyers. He would score his first NHL goal on January 16, 2001, on Los Angeles Kings goaltender Jamie Storr in a 7–6 loss. Rachůnek appeared in three playoff games, earning no points.

Rachůnek missed 31 games in 2001–02 due to injuries. In 51 games with Ottawa, he scored 3 goals and 18 points. He then missed the playoffs due to injuries.

Rachunek missed the first part of the 2002–03 season due to a contract dispute, as he played for Lokomotiv Yaroslavl of the Russian Superleague. In nine games with Yaroslavl, he scored three goals. On November 8, 2002, he re-signed with the Senators and would appear in 58 games, scoring 4 goals and 29 points. Rachůnek then played in 17 playoff games, scoring one goal and four points. He scored his first playoff goal against Martin Brodeur of the New Jersey Devils on May 17, 2003, in a 5–2 loss. Rachůnek also played in six games with the Binghamton Senators of the American Hockey League (AHL), earning two assists.

In 2003–04, Rachůnek played in 60 games with the Senators, scoring a goal and 17 points. His time with the Senators came to an end as of March 9, 2004, after he was traded alongside Alexandre Giroux to the New York Rangers in exchange for Greg de Vries.

=== New York Rangers ===
Rachůnek finished the 2003–04 season with the Rangers. He appeared in his first game with New York on March 12, 2004, against the Tampa Bay Lightning as the Rangers lost 5–2. He scored his first goal and point as a Ranger on March 25, 2004, beating goaltender Tomáš Vokoun of the Nashville Predators in a 4–2 loss. He finished the year playing in 12 games with the Rangers, scoring one goal and four points.

=== Orli Znojmo ===
With the 2004–05 NHL lockout cancelling the season, Rachůnek signed with Orli Znojmo of the Czech Extraliga on September 6, 2004. In 21 games, he scored 5 goals and 11 points before becoming a free agent at the end of October.

=== Lokomotiv Yaroslavl ===
On November 15, 2004, Rachůnek returned to Lokomotiv Yaroslav of the RSL, where he first played during the 2002–03 season when he and the Ottawa Senators could not agree to a contract. He finished the 2004–05 season with the club, scoring 6 goals and 14 points in 27 games. In the playoffs, Rachunek had two goals in nine games.

Rather than return to the NHL for the 2005–06 season, Rachunek opted to remain with Yaroslavl. In 45 games, Rachunek had 11 goals and 27 points. He was then held pointless in two playoff games, accumulating 29 penalty minutes in those two games.

=== Return to New York Rangers ===
Rachůnek returned to the New York Rangers for the 2006–07 season. In 66 games, he had 6 goals and 26 points, helping the team into the playoffs. In six playoff games, he had four assists. After the season, Rachůnek became a free agent.

=== New Jersey Devils ===
On July 3, 2007, the New Jersey Devils signed Rachunek for the 2007–08 season. He played in his first game as a Devil on October 4, 2007, in a 3–1 loss to the Tampa Bay Lightning. He recorded his first point on October 8, 2007, an assist against his former team, the Ottawa Senators, in a 4–2 loss. Rachůnek scored his first goal with New Jersey on November 17, 2007, against Martin Biron of the Philadelphia Flyers in a 6–2 win. Injuries cut his season short, as Rachůnek appeared in only 49 games, scoring 4 goals and 13 points. At the end of the season, Rachunek became a free agent.

=== Dynamo Moscow ===
On August 31, 2008, Rachůnek signed a contract with HC Dynamo Moscow of the Kontinental Hockey League (KHL). In the 2008–09 season, Rachůnek had 9 goals and 32 points in 50 games. In 12 playoff games, he had four goals and eight points.

Rachůnek returned to Dynamo Moscow for the 2009–10 season, where he scored 10 goals and 27 points in 52 games, helping the club reach the post-season. In four playoff games, Rachunek had no points.

=== Lokomotiv Yaroslavl ===
Rachůnek returned to Lokomotiv Yaroslavl, now competing in the KHL, for the third time in the 2010–11 season. In 50 games with Yaroslavl, he scored 11 goals and 46 points, as the team finished with the best record in the Tarasov Division. In 18 playoff games, Rachunek had 8 goals and 13 points.

Rachůnek returned to the team for 2011–12. On September 7, 2011, he was killed in the 2011 Lokomotiv Yaroslavl plane crash.

== International play ==
Medal record

Representing Czech Republic

World Championships
Gold medal – first place	2010 Cologne	
Bronze medal – third place	2011 Bratislava	

Rachůnek played with the Czech Republic national ice hockey team in various tournaments throughout his career. At the 1999 World Junior Ice Hockey Championships held in Winnipeg, Rachůnek scored one goal and four points in six games as the Czech Republic finished in seventh place.

At the 2009 IIHF World Championship in Switzerland, Rachunek had four assists in seven games as the Czech Republic finished in sixth place. He earned a spot on the team again for the 2010 IIHF World Championship held in Germany, as he scored two goals (one of them game tying just seven seconds to play in semi-final against Sweden) and four points in nine games, helping the Czech Republic to the gold medal. Rachůnek had an assist on the game-winning goal in the gold medal game. At the 2011 IIHF World Championship in Slovakia, Rachůnek had a goal and three points in nine games, helping the Czech Republic to the bronze medal.

== Death ==
On September 7, 2011, eleven days after turning 32, Rachůnek died in the Lokomotiv Yaroslavl plane crash, along with his entire Lokomotiv team, just outside Yaroslavl, Russia. The team was on its way to their 2011–12 season opener with the entire team, coaching staff and prospects. Lokomotiv officials said "everyone from the main roster was on the plane plus four players from the youth team. The team was traveling to Minsk to play their opening game of the season."

It was during the takeoff, after the runway of 3 kilometres, that the airplane simply could not get up high enough, according to reports the plane reached a total altitude of 10–50 metres before hitting a pylon and dropping to the left. Parts of the airplane spread in the Volga River, and others on plain land, as it broke apart just before once again touching the ground.

== Career statistics ==
=== Regular season and playoffs ===
			Regular season					Playoffs
Season	Team	League	GP	G	A	Pts	PIM	GP	G	A	Pts	PIM
1995–96	AC ZPS Zlín	CZE U18	38	8	11	19		—	—	—	—	—
1996–97	HC ZPS-Barum Zlín	CZE U20	27	2	11	13		—	—	—	—	—
1997–98	HC ZPS-Barum Zlín	ELH	28	1	2	3	16	—	—	—	—	—
1997–98	IHC Prostějov	CZE.2	7	1	1	2		—	—	—	—	—
1998–99	HC ZPS-Barum Zlín	ELH	39	3	9	12	88	6	0	0	0	4
1999–00	Ottawa Senators	NHL	6	0	0	0	2	—	—	—	—	—
1999–00	Grand Rapids Griffins	IHL	62	6	20	26	64	9	0	5	5	6
2000–01	Ottawa Senators	NHL	71	3	30	33	60	3	0	0	0	0
2001–02	Ottawa Senators	NHL	51	3	15	18	24	—	—	—	—	—
2002–03	Lokomotiv Yaroslavl	RSL	9	3	0	3	8	—	—	—	—	—
2002–03	Ottawa Senators	NHL	58	4	25	29	30	17	1	3	4	14
2002–03	Binghamton Senators	AHL	6	0	2	2	10	—	—	—	—	—
2003–04	Ottawa Senators	NHL	60	1	16	17	29	—	—	—	—	—
2003–04	New York Rangers	NHL	12	1	3	4	4	—	—	—	—	—
2004–05	HC JME Znojemští Orli	ELH	21	5	6	11	55	—	—	—	—	—
2004–05	Lokomotiv Yaroslavl	RSL	27	6	8	14	69	9	2	0	2	6
2005–06	Lokomotiv Yaroslavl	RSL	45	11	26	27	73	2	0	0	0	29
2006–07	New York Rangers	NHL	66	6	20	26	38	6	0	4	4	2
2007–08	New Jersey Devils	NHL	47	4	9	13	40	—	—	—	—	—
2008–09	Dynamo Moscow	KHL	50	9	23	32	85	12	4	4	8	8
2009–10	Dynamo Moscow	KHL	52	10	17	27	74	4	0	0	0	6
2010–11	Lokomotiv Yaroslavl	KHL	50	11	35	46	99	18	8	5	13	10
NHL totals			371	22	118	140	227	26	1	7	8	16
KHL totals			152	30	75	105	258	34	12	9	21	24

=== International ===
Year	Team	Event	GP	G	A	Pts	PIM
1997	Czech Republic	EJC	6	0	1	1	16
1998	Czech Republic	WJC	7	0	0	0	6
1999	Czech Republic	WJC	6	1	3	4	4
2009	Czech Republic	WC	7	0	4	4	2
2010	Czech Republic	WC	9	2	2	4	10
2011	Czech Republic	WC	9	1	2	3	6
Junior totals			19	1	4	5	26
Senior totals			25	3	8	11	18

== See also ==
- List of ice hockey players who died during their playing career
