= Lukáš Žejdl =

Czech ice hockey player

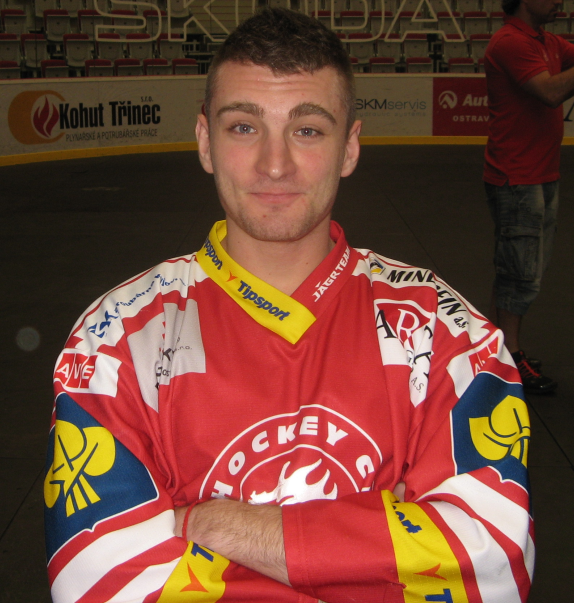
- Born: August 7, 1991 (age 35) Most, Czechoslovakia
- Height: 6 ft 3 in (191 cm)
- Weight: 194 lb (88 kg; 13 st 12 lb)
- Position: Right wing
- Shot: Left
- Czech Extraliga team Former teams: HC Litvinov; HC Slavia Praha; HC Oceláři Třinec; BK Mladá Boleslav
- Playing career: 2010–2024

Lukáš Žejdl (born August 7, 1991) is a Czech professional ice hockey right winger currently playing for HC Litvinov of the Czech Extraliga.

Žejdl previously played for HC Slavia Praha and HC Oceláři Třinec before joining Mladá Boleslav in 2015 in an initial loan spell. After another loan spell for the 2016–17 season, Žejdl joined Mladá Boleslav permanently in 2017.

After spending half of 2019–20 with BK Mladá Boleslav and half on loan with HK Hradec Kralove, Zejdl signed to play with HC Litvinov for the 2020–21 season.

== Career statistics ==
			Regular season					Playoffs
Season	Team	League	GP	G	A	Pts	PIM	GP	G	A	Pts	PIM
2005–06	HC Litvínov U18	Czech U18	11	1	2	3	4	—	—	—	—	—
2005–06	HC Slavia Praha U18	Czech U18	4	0	1	1	0	—	—	—	—	—
2006–07	HC Slavia Praha U18	Czech U18	44	11	14	25	24	2	0	0	0	0
2007–08	HC Slavia Praha U18	Czech U18	44	24	20	44	30	6	3	2	5	4
2008–09	HC Slavia Praha U20	Czech U20	38	19	18	37	40	2	0	0	0	2
2009–10	HC Slavia Praha U20	Czech U20	48	22	34	56	40	9	2	5	7	16
2010–11	HC Slavia Praha U20	Czech U20	24	13	20	33	42	4	2	2	4	2
2010–11	HC Slavia Praha	Czech	21	2	3	5	6	1	0	0	0	0
2010–11	HC Berounští Medvědi	Czech2	4	0	0	0	2	—	—	—	—	—
2011–12	HC Slavia Praha U20	Czech U20	17	13	29	42	16	1	1	3	4	0
2011–12	HC Slavia Praha	Czech	13	1	2	3	4	—	—	—	—	—
2011–12	HC Most	Czech2	14	7	5	12	4	—	—	—	—	—
2011–12	HC Berounští Medvědi	Czech2	5	0	3	3	6	—	—	—	—	—
2012–13	HC Slavia Praha U20	Czech U20	2	2	2	4	40	—	—	—	—	—
2012–13	HC Slavia Praha	Czech	36	8	7	15	14	11	2	3	5	10
2012–13	HC Berounští Medvědi	Czech2	1	0	0	0	0	—	—	—	—	—
2013–14	HC Slavia Praha	Czech	47	6	20	26	14	5	0	1	1	2
2014–15	HC Oceláři Třinec	Czech	37	6	11	17	20	4	0	0	0	4
2015–16	HC Oceláři Třinec	Czech	16	6	2	8	10	—	—	—	—	—
2015–16	BK Mladá Boleslav	Czech	26	5	7	12	45	—	—	—	—	—
2016–17	BK Mladá Boleslav	Czech	49	12	8	20	28	5	3	2	5	0
2017–18	BK Mladá Boleslav	Czech	41	8	15	23	22	—	—	—	—	—
2018–19	BK Mladá Boleslav	Czech	39	15	16	31	14	6	4	1	5	6
2019–20	BK Mladá Boleslav	Czech	13	2	2	4	27	—	—	—	—	—
2019–20	Mountfield HK	Czech	15	2	2	4	4	—	—	—	—	—
2020–21	HC Litvínov	Czech	19	2	0	2	10	3	0	0	0	0
2021–22	HC Slavia Praha	Czech2	44	18	24	42	63	6	1	1	2	27
2022–23	HC Slavia Praha	Czech2	50	22	14	36	36	2	1	0	1	2
2023–24	HC Slavia Praha	Czech2	20	1	8	9	22	—	—	—	—	—
Czech totals			372	75	95	170	218	35	9	7	16	22
Czech2 totals			138	48	54	102	133	8	2	1	3	29
