= Petr Martínek =

Czech ice hockey defenceman

- Born: September 11, 1972 (age 53) Chomutov, Czechoslovakia
- Height: 6 ft 6 in (198 cm)
- Weight: 265 lb (120 kg; 18 st 13 lb)
- Position: Defence
- Shot: Left
- Played for: HC Litvínov; HC Slavia Praha; HC Znojemští Orli; Lillehammer IK
- Playing career: 1990–2011

Petr Martínek (born September 11, 1972) is a Czech former professional ice hockey defenceman. He is currently the head coach of Piráti Chomutov of the Maxa liga.

Martínek played 154 games in the Czech Extraliga for HC Litvínov, HC Slavia Praha and HC Znojemští Orli. He also played one season in Norway's UPC-ligaen for Lillehammer IK during the 2004–05 season.
