= Vojtěch Dobiáš =

Czech ice hockey forward

- Born: 18 July 2000 (age 24); Uherské Hradiště, Czech Republic
- Height: 6 ft 0 in (183 cm)
- Weight: 192 lb (87 kg; 13 st 10 lb)
- Position: Forward
- Shoots: Left
- ELH team (P) Cur. team: PSG Berani Zlín; HC ZUBR Přerov (Chance Liga)
- Playing career: 2019–present

Vojtěch Dobiáš (born 18 July 2000) is a Czech professional ice hockey forward. He is currently playing for HC ZUBR Přerov of the Chance Liga on loan from PSG Berani Zlín.

Dobias has been a member of Berani Zlín since 2014, where he featured in their various academies. His first exposure to the professional ranks came with a loan spell at LHK Jestřábi Prostějov during the 2018–19 season, where he played six games. He made his senior debut for Zlín during the 2019–20 Czech Extraliga season, playing two games, and signed an extension with the team on 24 April 2000.
