= Ivan Rachůnek =

Czech ice hockey player

- Born: July 6, 1981 (age 44) Zlín, Czechoslovakia
- Height: 5 ft 9 in (175 cm)
- Weight: 176 lb (80 kg; 12 st 8 lb)
- Position: Forward
- Shot: Left
- Played for: HC Zlín (Czech Extraliga)
- National team: Czech Republic
- NHL draft: 187th overall, 1999; Tampa Bay Lightning
- Playing career: 1999–2019

Ivan Rachůnek (born July 6, 1981) is a Czech former professional ice hockey player. He was selected by the Tampa Bay Lightning in the seventh round (187th overall) of the 1999 NHL entry draft. Rachunek is the brother of Karel Rachůnek and Tomáš Rachůnek who have also played professional ice hockey.

Rachůnek played with HC Zlín in the Czech Extraliga during the 2010–11 Czech Extraliga season.
