= Józef Kubisz =

Austro-Hungarian diplomat (1885–1940)

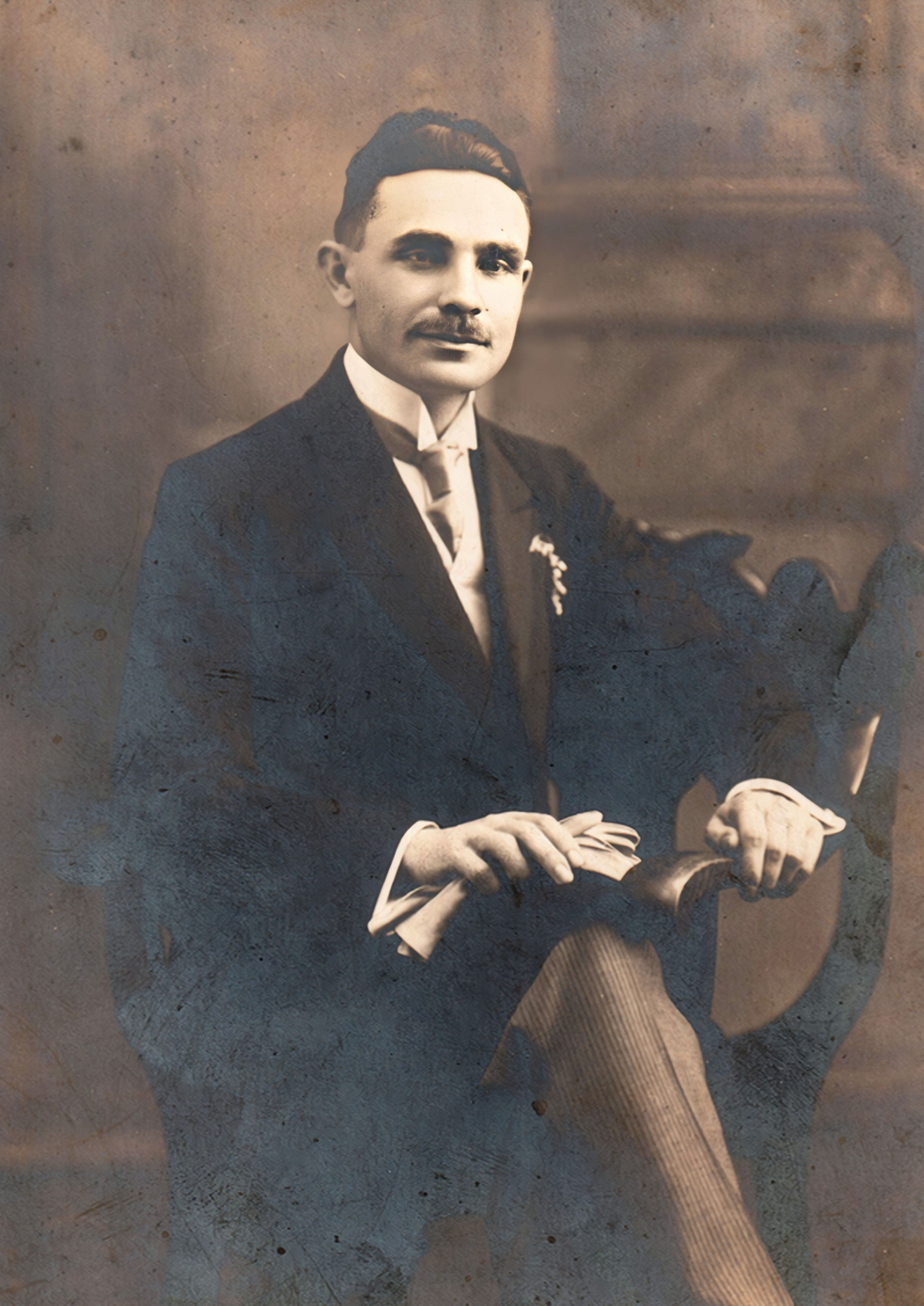
- Józef Kubisz
- Born: 15 March 1885; Konska, Austrian Silesia
- Died: 6 November 1940 (aged 55); Chicago, Illinois, US
- Burial place: Saint Adalbert Catholic Cemetery in Niles, Cook County
- Occupation(s): Diplomat and consul
- Employer: Second Polish Republic

Signature
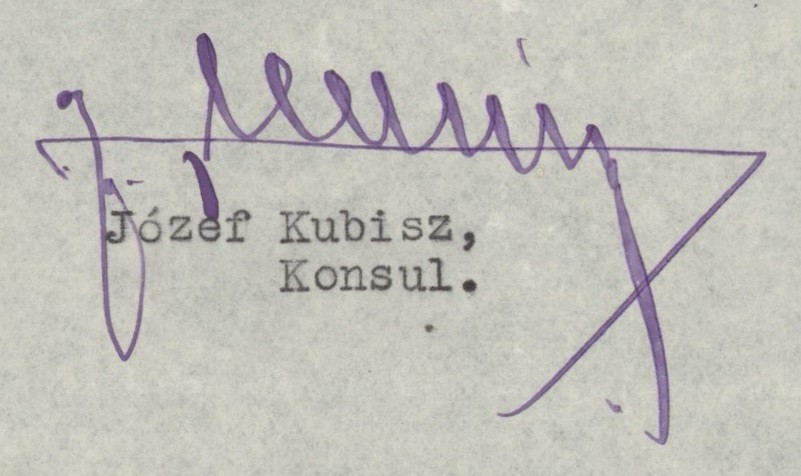

Józef Kubisz (14 March 1885 – 6 November 1940) was an Austro-Hungarian and Polish diplomat in the United States. During the years 1919 to 1933 he held the post of Polish consul in New York City, Pittsburgh and Chicago.

Kubisz was born on 14 March 1885 in Konska, Cieszyn Silesia, into an agricultural family. He was the son of Paweł Kubisz (born 1831) and Ewa Zielina (1851–1928). He attended primary school in Konska and the Protestant gymnasium in Cieszyn. Józef Kubisz served as a volunteer in the Austro-Hungarian Navy. He was the Austro-Hungarian diplomat in the United States.

In 1919 he was accepted into the Polish consular service and worked in New York, Pittsburgh and Chicago. Before leaving for the U.S., he lived in Warsaw. According to U.S. immigration records, his arrival was on 2 June 1919 (Ship Canada from Marseilles to New York). In 1930, according to U.S. Census records, he was living in Pittsburgh. He returned to Poland in 1933, where he worked at the Ministry of Posts and Telegraphs in Warsaw (until 1939).

He married Helen E Hojka; she was a descendant of Polish emigrants to the United States. The wedding ceremony took a place on 19 May 1925 in Cook County. They had no children.

He died on 6 November 1940 in Chicago at age 55 and was buried on 11 November 1940 in Saint Adalbert Catholic Cemetery in Niles, Cook County.

== Gallery ==
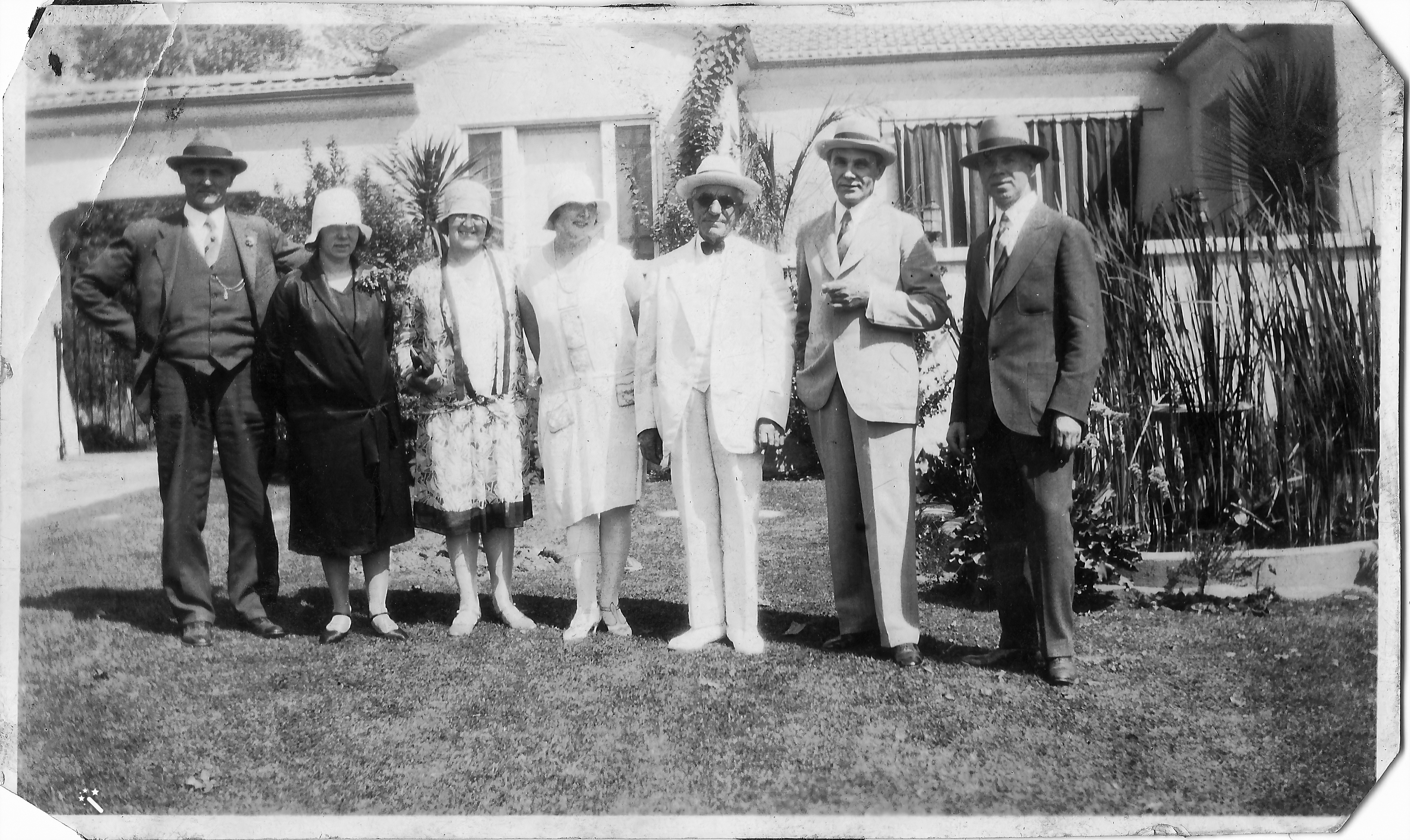
In California - Józef (2nd from the right) and Helen (in the middle) E Hojka Kubisz with family

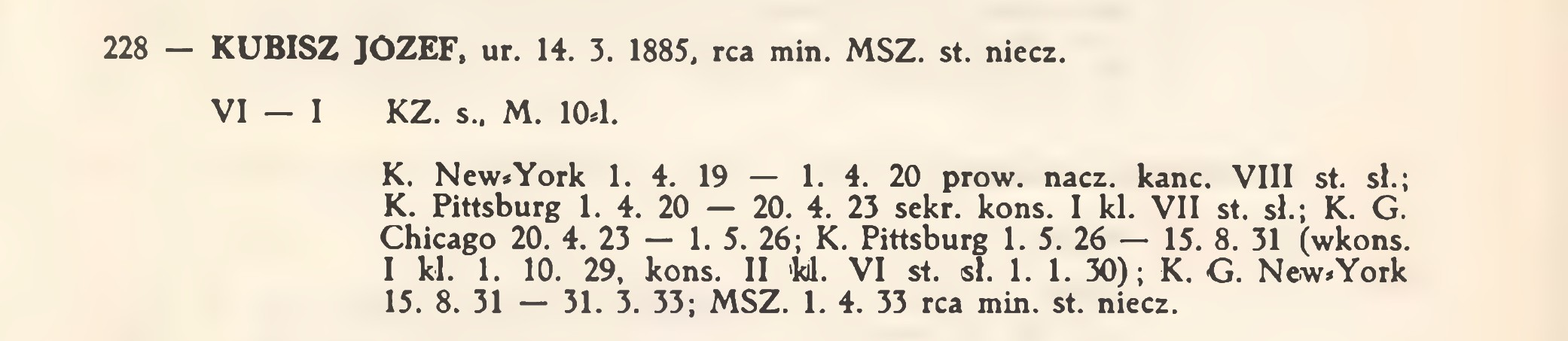
Józef Kubisz – consular service 1919–1933

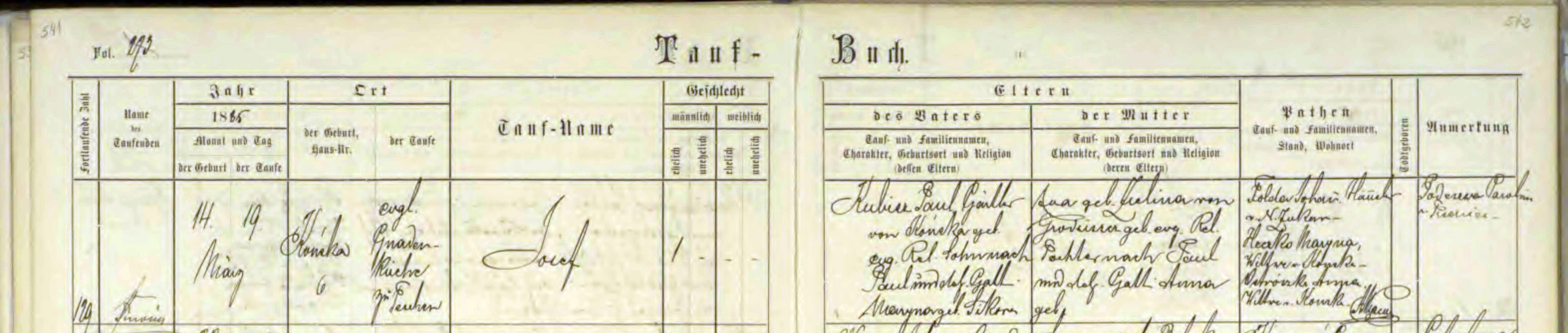
Birth record of Kubisz

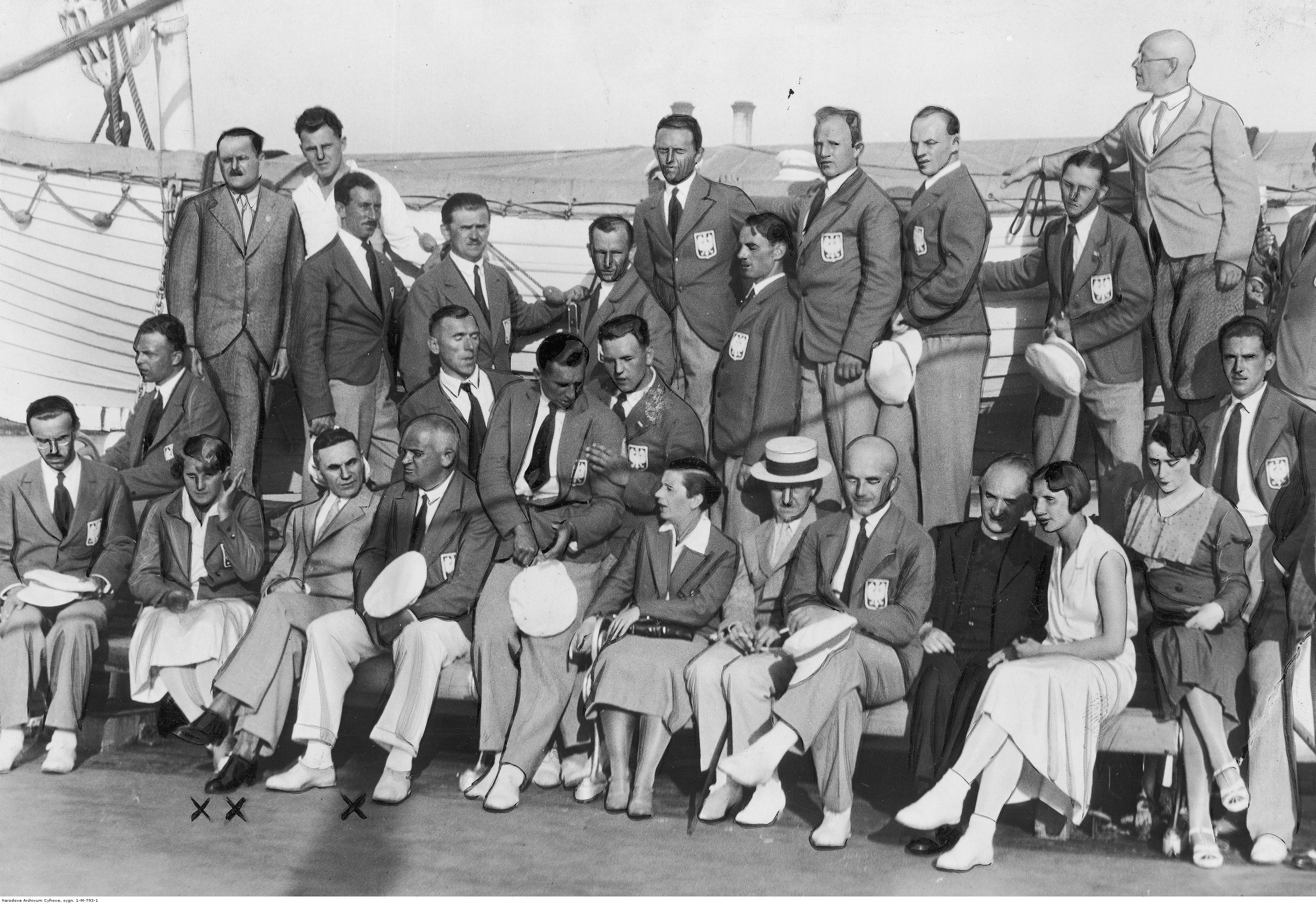
A group of Polish Olympians (1932) including General Stanisław Rouppert (x) and Józef Kubisz (xx)

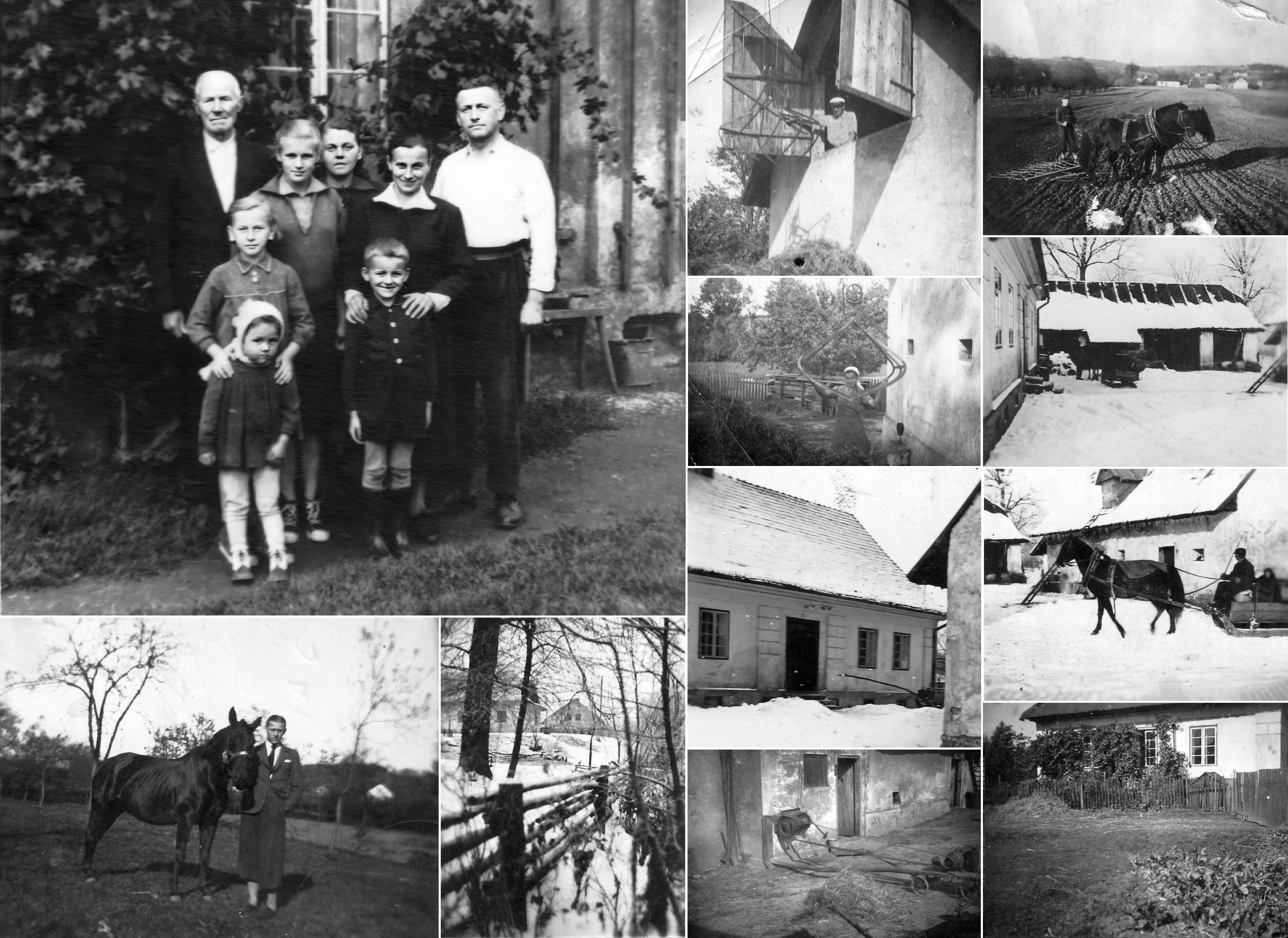
Birthplace and family of Józef Kubisz
