= Jan Holý =

Czech ice hockey player

- Born: March 11, 1995 (age 30) Czech Republic
- Height: 6 ft 2 in (188 cm)
- Weight: 183 lb (83 kg; 13 st 1 lb)
- Position: Defense
- Shoots: Right
- Czech team: HC Plzeň
- Playing career: 2013–present

Jan Holý (born March 11, 1995) is a Czech professional ice hockey player. He is currently playing for HC Plzeň of the Czech Extraliga.

Holý made his Czech Extraliga debut playing with HC Plzeň during the 2013-14 Czech Extraliga season.
