= Niklas Tikkinen =

Finnish ice hockey player

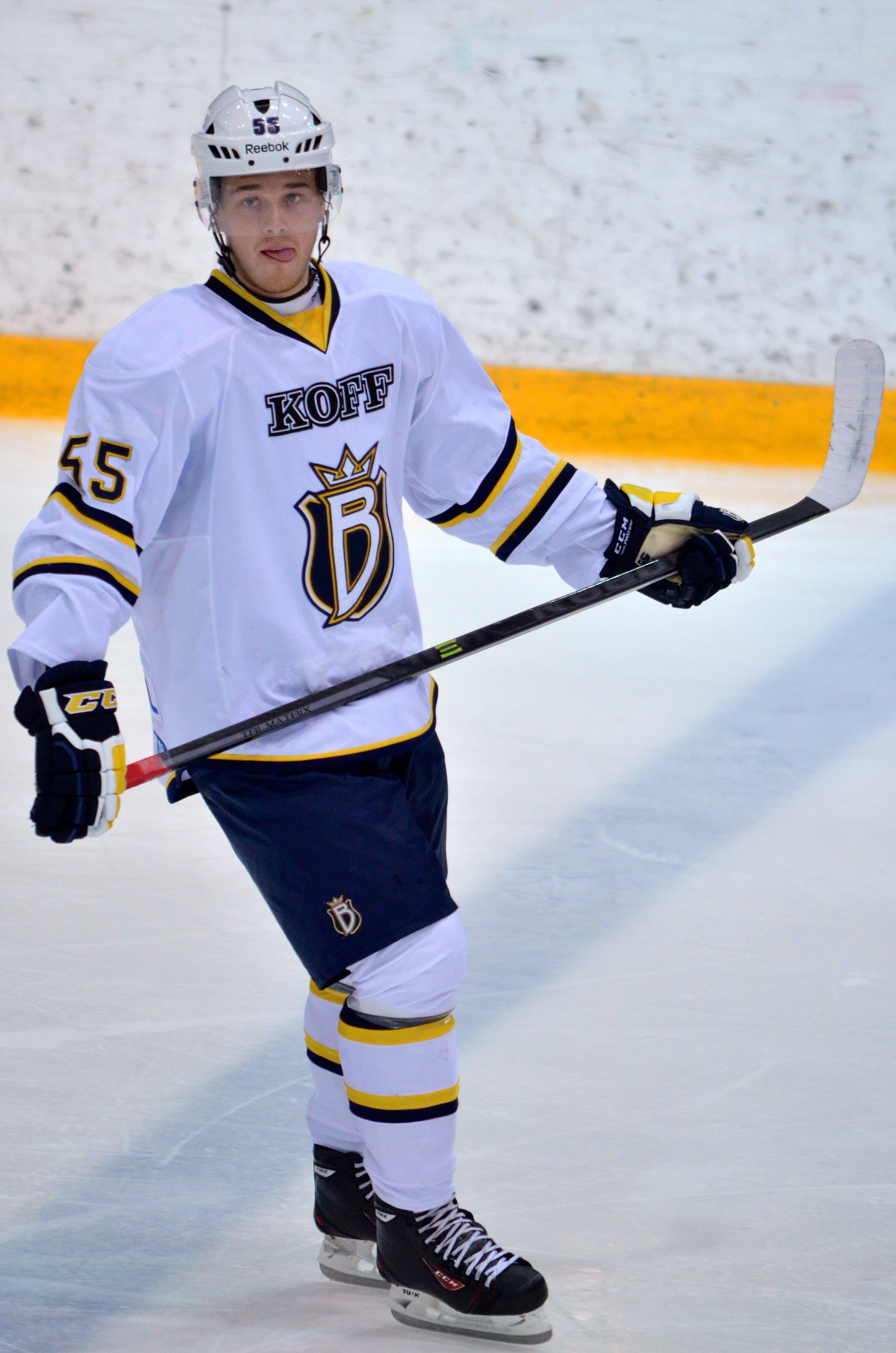
- Tikkinen with the Espoo Blues in 2013
- Born: June 1, 1994 (age 31) Espoo, Finland
- Height: 181 cm (5 ft 11 in)
- Weight: 84 kg (185 lb; 13 st 3 lb)
- Position: Defence
- Shoots: Left
- EIHL team Former teams: Glasgow Clan; Steinbach Black Wings 1992; VEU Feldkirch; Asplöven HC; Timrå IK; JYP Jyväskylä; Espoo Blues; Herlev Eagles
- NHL draft: 148th overall, 2012; Phoenix Coyotes
- Playing career: 2012–present

Niklas Tikkinen (born June 1, 1994) is a Finnish professional ice hockey defenseman, currently playing with the Glasgow Clan in the UK's Elite Ice Hockey League (EIHL). Tikkinen was previously with the Herlev Eagles in the Danish Metal Ligaen. Tikkinen was selected by the Phoenix Coyotes in the 5th round (148th overall) of the 2012 NHL entry draft.

Tikkinen made his SM-liiga debut playing with Espoo Blues during the 2012–13 SM-liiga season. He has subsequently played in the HockeyAllsvenskan, the Alps Hockey League, the ICE Hockey League, and the Metal Ligaen.
