= Pavel Kubiš =

Czech ice hockey player

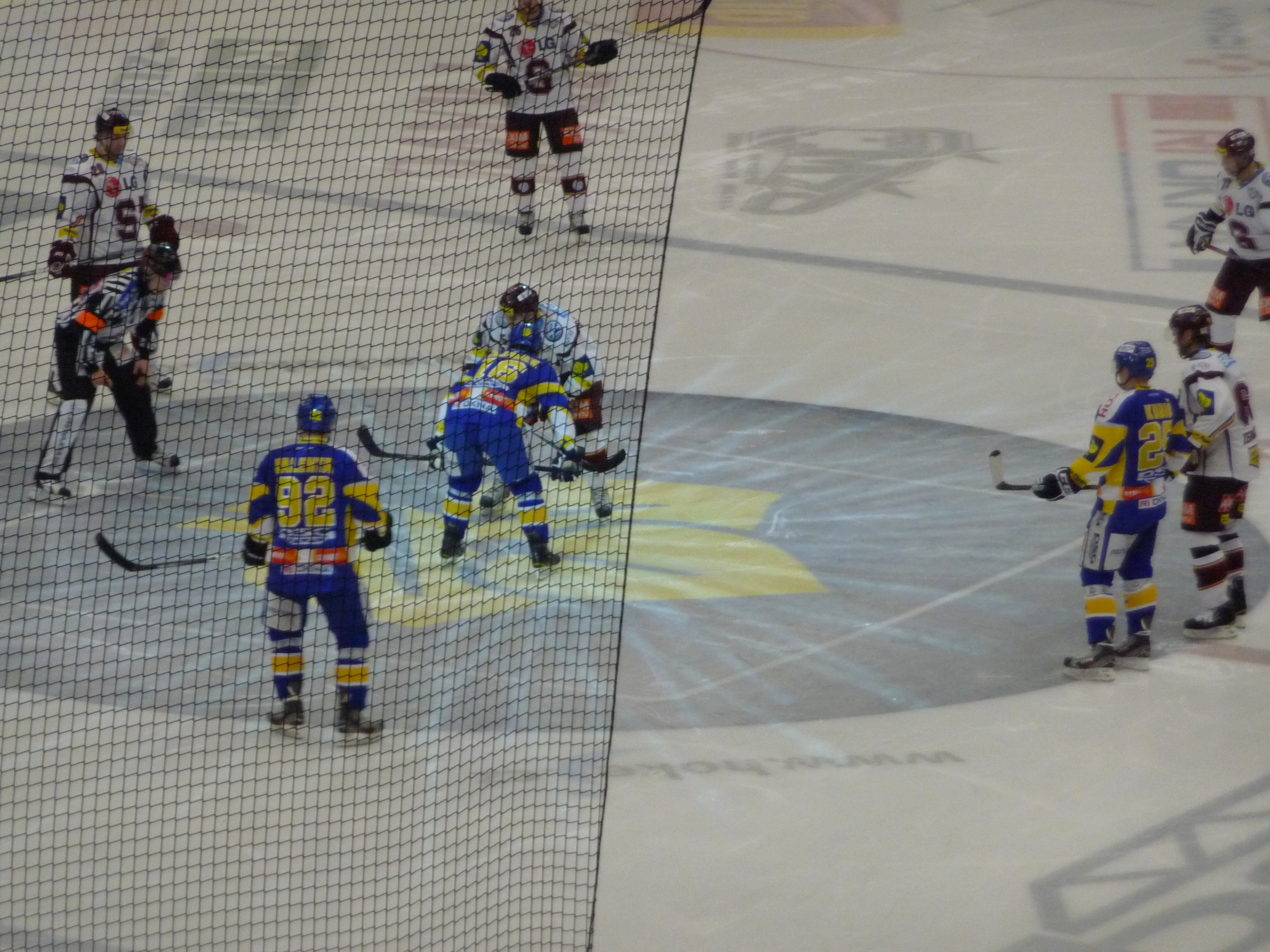
- Born: March 17, 1985 (age 40); Náměšť nad Oslavou, Czechoslovakia
- Height: 5 ft 11 in (180 cm)
- Weight: 179 lb (81 kg; 12 st 11 lb)
- Position: Forward
- Shoots: Left
- Czech Extraliga team: HC Zlín
- National team: Czech Republic
- Playing career: 2005–present

Pavel Kubiš (born March 17, 1985) is a Czech professional ice hockey player currently playing with HC Zlín in the Czech Extraliga.

Kubiš has been with Zíln since 2000 and made his debut for the senior team during the 2004-05 Czech Extraliga playoffs.
