= Alexander Mokshantsev (ice hockey, born 1995) =

Russian ice hockey player

- Born: February 17, 1995 (age 31) Penza, Russia
- Height: 6 ft 1 in (185 cm)
- Weight: 174 lb (79 kg; 12 st 6 lb)
- Position: Forward
- Shoots: Left
- Polska Hokej Liga team Former teams: STS Sanok; Lokomotiv Yaroslavl; Dizel Penza; Nottingham Panthers; Rapaces de Gap; HC Shakhtyor Soligorsk; Yuzhny Ural Orsk
- NHL draft: Undrafted
- Playing career: 2013–present

Aleksander Aleksandrovich Mokshantsev (Мокшанцев Александр Александрович; born February 17, 1995) is a Russian ice hockey player for Polska Hokej Liga side STS Sanok. He most recently iced for Yuzhny Ural Orsk. He was previously with Nottingham Panthers of the Elite Ice Hockey League (EIHL) and Ligue Magnus side Rapaces de Gap.

Mokshantsev made his Kontinental Hockey League (KHL) debut playing with Lokomotiv Yaroslavl during the 2013–14 KHL season.

In June 2017, Mokshantsev moved to the UK to sign for the Nottingham Panthers of the Elite League. He has since iced with Rapaces de Gap, Dizel Penza, HC Shakhtyor Soligorsk and Yuzhny Ural Orsk.
