= Tomáš Rachůnek =

Czech ice hockey player

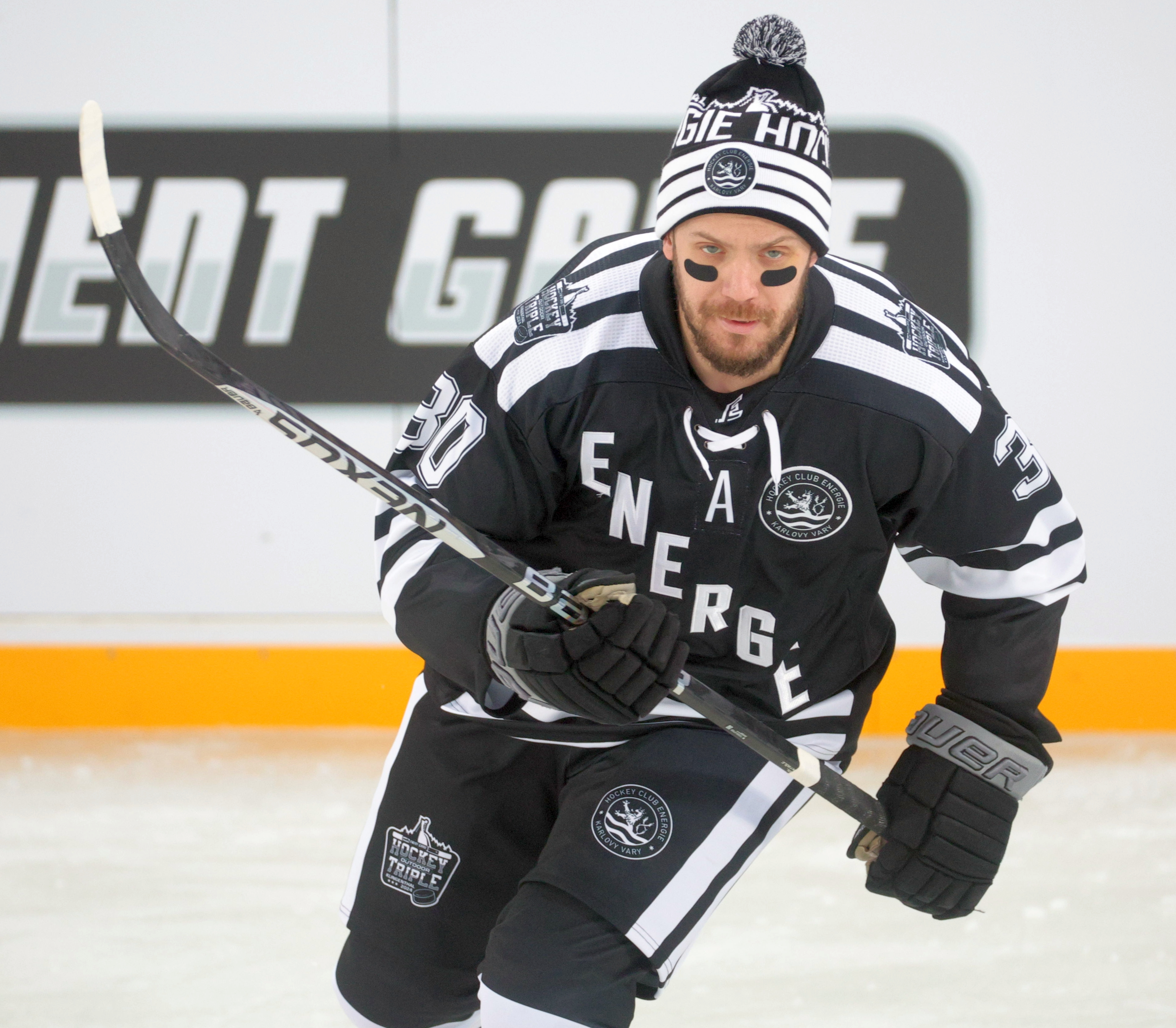
- Tomáš Rachůnek in 2024
- Born: February 26, 1991 (age 34); Zlín, Czechoslovakia
- Height: 6 ft 0 in (183 cm)
- Weight: 194 lb (88 kg; 13 st 12 lb)
- Position: Forward
- Shoots: Right
- KHL team Former teams: HC Lev Praha; CZE; HC Sparta Praha
- NHL draft: Undrafted
- Playing career: 2010–present

Tomáš Rachůnek (born February 26, 1991) is a Czech professional ice hockey player. He played with HC Plzeň 1929 in the Czech Extraliga during the 2010–11 Czech Extraliga season. From 2008 to 2010, he played for Sault Ste. Marie Greyhounds in the Ontario Hockey League. He is the younger brother of Ivan Rachůnek and Karel Rachůnek who have also played professional ice hockey.
