= RI Okna Berani Zlín =

RI OKNA Berani Zlín
- City: Zlín, Czech Republic
- League: Maxa liga
- Founded: 1928
- Home arena: Trinity Bank Arena Luďka Čajky (capacity: 7,000)
- Colours: Blue, yellow
- Owner: The statutory city of Zlín
- General manager: (Czech Republic) Jan Pravda
- Head coach: (Slovakia) Peter Oremus
- Captain: (Czech Republic) Petr Holík
- Website: beranizlin.cz

RI OKNA Berani Zlín is an ice hockey team in the Maxa Liga. Their home arena is Trinity Bank Arena Luďka Čajky in Zlín (The biggest city in the Zlín Region of Czech Republic). They won the Extraliga in 2004 and 2014.

The ševci (shoemakers) named for the famous Bata family who built their company in Zlin in the early to mid 20th century, were automatically relegated from the 1st division in 2023 following an poor season which coincided with an automatic relegation rather than a playoff for the first time in the league.

A memorable win came for Zlin, playing away in a derby match against Brno in 2012 where after regular time ended in a three all draw, and overtime could still not separate the team, Ševci came away with a glorious win in the shootout.

Their rival, Vsetín, has frequently been defeated by them, with another match scheduled for 2026.

== Honours ==
=== Domestic ===
Czech Extraliga

- (gold) Winners (2): 2003–04, 2013–14
- (silver) Runners-up (4): 1994–95, 1998–99, 2004–05, 2012–13
- (bronze) 3rd place (1): 2001–02

Czech 1. Liga

- (gold) Winners (1): 2022–23
- (silver) Runners-up (3): 2023–24, 2024–25, 2025–26

Czechoslovak Extraliga

- (bronze) 3rd place (1): 1984–85

=== Pre-season ===
Rona Cup

- (gold) Winners (3): 2005, 2011, 2015
- (silver) Runners-up (5): 1995, 2001, 2006, 2010, 2012

Tipsport Hockey Cup

- (silver) Runners-up (1): 2009

== Players ==
=== Current roster ===
Source: beranizlin.czSource: eliteprospects.comAs of October 1, 2021.

No.	Nat	Player	Pos	S/G	Age	Acquired	Birthplace
15	(Czech Republic)	Lukáš Chludil	F	L	23	2020	Zlín, Czech Republic
5	(Czech Republic)	Tomáš Žižka	D	L	47	2014	Šternberk, Czechoslovakia
57	(Czech Republic)	Daniel Huf	G	L	27	2019	Kroměříž, Czech Republic
81	(Czech Republic)	Vojtěch Dobiáš	C	L	26	2019	Uherské Hradiště, Czech Republic
90	(Czech Republic)	Lukáš Vopelka	RW	R	30	2020	České Budějovice, Czech Republic
51	(Czech Republic)	Jakub Šlahař	RW	R	35	2018	Zlín, Czechoslovakia
72	(Czech Republic)	Darek Hejcman	C	R	31	2020	Chomutov, Czech Republic
65	(Czech Republic)	Pavel Sedláček	LW	L	32	2012	Zlín, Czech Republic
43	(Czech Republic)	Daniel Gazda	D	R	29	2016	Zlín, Czech Republic
88	(Czech Republic)	Zdeněk Okál	LW	L	36	2010	Zlín, Czechoslovakia
77	(Czech Republic)	Jiří Karafiát	RW	R	28	2016	Zlín, Czech Republic
18	(Czech Republic)	Martin Novotný	D	L	37	2021	Šumperk, Czechoslovakia
9	(Czech Republic)	Bedřich Köhler	RW	R	41	2019	Ostrava, Czechoslovakia
8	(Czech Republic)	Štěpán Fryšara	C	L	28	2017	Valašské Meziříčí, Czech Republic
67	(Czech Republic)	Jan Dluhoš	D	L	26	2018	Kroměříž, Czech Republic
27	(Czech Republic)	Antonín Honejsek	LW	L	35	2016	Prostějov, Czechoslovakia
24	(Czech Republic)	Jiří Suhrada	D	L	25	2020	Zlín, Czech Republic
25	(Czech Republic)	Pavel Kubiš	LW	L	41	2004	Náměšť nad Oslavou, Czechoslovakia
40	(Czech Republic)	Matyáš Hamrlík	D	L	26	2018	Zlín, Czech Republic
11	(Czech Republic)	Matěj Sebera	LW	L	25	2020	Zlín, Czech Republic
42	(Canada)	Alexandre Mallet	C	R	34	2021	Amqui, Quebec, Canada

== Club names ==
- 1929 – SK Baťa Zlín (Sportovní klub Baťa Zlín)
- 1945 – ZK Baťa Zlín (Závodní klub Baťa Zlín)
- 1948 – Sokol Botostroj Zlín
- 1949 – Sokol Svit Gottwaldov
- 1953 – DSO Jiskra Gottwaldov (Dobrovolná sportovní organizace Jiskra Gottwaldov)
- 1956 – TJ Spartak ZPS Gottwaldov (Tělovýchovná jednota Spartak Závody přesného strojírenství Gottwaldov)
- 1958 – TJ Gottwaldov (Tělovýchovná jednota Gottwaldov)
- 1989 – TJ Zlín (Tělovýchovná jednota Zlín)
- 1990 – SK Zlín (Sportovní klub Zlín)
- 1990 – AC ZPS Zlín (Associated Club Závody přesného strojírenství Zlín)
- 1997 – HC ZPS-Barum Zlín (Hockey Club Závody přesného strojírenství-Barum Zlín)
- 1999 – HC Barum Continental (Hockey Club Barum Continental)
- 2001 – HC Continental Zlín (Hockey Club Continental Zlín)
- 2002 – HC Hamé (Hockey Club Hamé)
- 2007 – RI Okna Zlín
- 2009 – PSG Zlín
- 2017 – Aukro Berani Zlín
- 2018 – PSG Berani Zlín
- 2023 – Berani Zlín
- 2024 – RI OKNA Berani Zlín

== Players ==
- See Category:HC Zlín players for a list of HC Zlín players past and present.
