= HC Slavia Praha =

Czech ice hockey team

- City: Prague, Czech Republic
- League: Czech 1. Liga; 2015–present
- Founded: 1900
- Home arena: Zimní stadion Eden
- Colors: Red, white
- Owner: Stanislav Tichý
- General manager: Jaroslav Bednář
- Head coach: David Bruk
- Captain: Jan Holý
- Website: hc-slavia.cz

Franchise history
- 1900–1948: SK Slavia Praha
- 1948–1949: Sokol Slavia Praha
- 1949–1953: Dynamo Slavia Praha
- 1953–1965: Dynamo Praha
- 1965–1977: Slavia Praha
- 1977–1993: Slavia IPS Praha
- 1993–present: HC Slavia Praha

HC Slavia Praha (English: HC Slavia Prague) is a Czech professional ice hockey team located in Prague playing in the Czech 1st National Hockey League, the second-highest league in the country. Slavia played in the Czech Extraliga from 1994 until 2015, winning the national championship in 2003 and 2008. The club plays its home games at Zimní stadion Eden in Prague. From 2004 until 2015, it played at O2 Arena.

The team played in the 2008–09 season of the Champions Hockey League.

The team was relegated to the 1. Liga in the 2014–15 Czech Extraliga season.

== Players ==
=== World champions and Olympic champions ===
- Jan Fleischmann (ME 1911, 1914)
- Miloslav Fleischmann (ME 1911, 1922)
- J. Jarkovský (ME 1911)
- Jaroslav Jirkovský (ME 1911, 1914, 1922, 1925)
- Tomáš Kucharčík (MS 1999)
- Josef Loos (ME 1914)
- Valentin Loos (ME 1922, 1925)
- Jan Palouš (ME 1911, 1914)
- František Rublič (ME 1914)
- Vladimír Růžička (WOG 1998; MS 2005, 2010 as Head coach)
- Bohumil Steingenhöfer (ME 1929)
- Jaroslav Špaček (MS 2005)
- Josef Šroubek (ME 1925, 1929)
- Viktor Ujčík (MS 1996, 2001)
- Josef Vašíček (MS 2005)
- Otakar Vindyš (ME 1911, 1922, 1925)
- Tomáš Vlasák (MS 1999, 2000, 2001)

== Honours ==
- Czech Extraliga
  - Champions (2): 2003, 2008
