= 2010 KHL Junior Draft =

General information
- Date: June 4, 2010
- Location: Moscow, Russia

Overview
- League: KHL
- First selection: (Czech Republic) Dmitrij Jaškin; Selected by: Sibir Novosibirsk

The 2010 KHL Junior Draft was the second entry draft held by the Kontinental Hockey League (KHL), taking place on June 4, 2010. Ice hockey players from around the world aged between 17 and 21 years of age were selected. Players eligible to take part in the draft were required to not have an active contract with a KHL, MHL or VHL team. A total of 690 players participated in the draft, 490 of these playing in Russia, 100 in Europe and 100 in North America.

The first pick of the first round was Dmitrij Jaškin playing for VHK Vsetín at the time of the draft. He was picked by Sibir Novosibirsk.

== Nullified picks ==
Three draft picks were nullified by the league:

- CSKA's pick of Mikael Backlund
- Sibir's pick of Philip Larsen
- Lokomotiv's pick of John Tavares

The reasoning for the nullification was that these three players had active contracts with National Hockey League teams at the time of the draft.

== Selections by round ==
=== 1st round ===
Rank	Player	Position	Nationality	Drafted by	Drafted from
1	Dmitrij Jaškin	A	Russia	Sibir Novosibirsk	HC Slavia Praha
2	Sami Vatanen	D	Finland	Metallurg Novokuznetsk	JYP Jyväskylä
3	Dmitri Ismagilov	A	Russia	Amur Khabarovsk	Mechel Chelyabinsk 93
4	Maksim Aliapkin	G	Russia	Vityaz Chekhov	Vityaz Chekhov 93
5	Martin Marinčin	D	Slovakia	Avtomobilist Yekaterinburg	HC Košice
6	Aleksey Shubin	A	Russia	Lokomotiv Yaroslavl (CSKA via Traktor)	Lokomotiv Yaroslavl 93
7	Aleksey Shamin	A	Russia	Lokomotiv Yaroslavl (Dinamo Minsk)	Lokomotiv Yaroslavl 93
8	Tomáš Kubalík	A	Czech Republic	Sibir Novosibirsk (Severstal)	Victoriaville Tigres
9	Aleksandr Torianik	A	Russia	Torpedo Nizhni Novgorod	HC Belgorod
10	Tomáš Pék	G	Czech Republic	SKA Saint Petersburg (Barys)	HC Slovan Bratislava
11	Sebastian Erixon	D	Sweden	SKA Saint Petersburg (Riga)	Timrå IK
12	David Musil	D	Czech Republic	SKA Saint Petersburg (CSKA)	Vancouver Giants
13	Joonas Donskoi	A	Finland	Avangard Omsk	Kärpät Oulu
14	Michael Vishnevetsky	G	United States	Spartak Moscow	Texas Tornado
15	Maksim Shalunov	A	Russia	Traktor Chelyabinsk (Atlant via Neftekhimik)	Traktor Chelyabinsk 93
16	Denis Perevoztchikov	G	Russia	Ak Bars Kazan	Ak Bars Kazan 93
17	Adam Larsson	D	Sweden	Lokomotiv Yaroslavl	Skellefteå AIK
18	Andrey Pedan	D	Russia	UHC Dynamo (Atlant)	Dynamo Moscow 93
19	Nail Yakupov	A	Russia	Neftekhimik Nizhnekamsk	Neftekhimik Nizhnekamsk 93
20	Anton Zlobin	A	Russia	UHC Dynamo	Spartak Moscow 93
21	David Bondra	A	Slovakia	Metallurg Magnitogorsk	Washington Nationals Jr
22	Nikita Nesterov	D	Russia	Traktor Chelyabinsk (SKA)	Traktor Chelyabinsk 93
23	Ludvig Rensfeldt	A	Sweden	Salavat Yulaev Ufa	Brynäs IF
24	Martin Frk	A	Czech Republic	Yugra Khanty-Mansiysk	HC Karlovy Vary

=== 2nd round ===
Rank	Player	Position	Nationality	Drafted by	Drafted from
25	Andrey Makarov	G	Russia	Atlant Mytishchi	Lada Togliatti 93
26	Nikolai Prokhorkin	A	Russia	Vityaz Chekhov	Vityaz Chekhov 93
27	Fiodor Beliakov	D	Russia	Metallurg Novokuznetsk	Krylia Sovetov
28	Aleksandr Petrov	A	Russia	Vityaz Chekhov	Vityaz Chekhov 93
29	Sergey Abramov	A	Russia	Amur Khabarovsk	Molot Prikamie Perm
30	Andrej Nestrašil	A	Czech Republic	Sibir Novosibirsk	Victoriaville Tigres
31	Artyom Sergeev	D	Russia	CSKA Moscow
32	Vitali Demakov	D	Russia	Traktor Chelyabinsk	Traktor Chelyabinsk 93
33	Stanislav Lopachuk	A	Belarus	Dinamo Minsk	HK Yunost Minsk
34	Maksim Zverev	D	Russia	Severstal Cherepovets	Chicago Young Americans
35	Eduard Ageev	A	Russia	Spartak Moscow	Molot Prikamie Perm 93
36	Kirill Kapustin	A	Russia	Lokomotiv Yaroslavl	Lokomotiv Yaroslavl 93
37	Eddy Rinke-Leitans	A	Latvia	Dinamo Riga
38	Maksim Shuvalov	D	Russia	Lokomotiv Yaroslavl	Lokomotiv Yaroslavl 93
39	Petr Straka	A	Czech Republic	Avangard Omsk	Rimouski Oceanic
40	Radko Gudas	D	Czech Republic	Spartak Moscow	Everett Silvertips
41	Vladimir Tkachiov	A	Russia	Ak Bars Kazan	Ak Bars Kazan 93
42	Oleg Misyul	D	Russia	Lokomotiv Yaroslavl	Lokomotiv Yaroslavl 93
43	David Rundblad	D	Sweden	Atlant Mytishchi	Skellefteå AIK
44	Dmitri Mikhailov	A	Russia	Metallurg Magnitogorsk	Metallurg Magnitogorsk 93
45	Martin Lundberg	C	Sweden	SKA Saint Petersburg	Skellefteå AIK
46	Jakob Silfverberg	A	Sweden	CSKA Moscow	Brynäs IF
47	Kirill Dyakov	D	Russia	Yugra Khanty-Mansiysk	Lokomotiv Yaroslavl 93
48	Bohumil Jank	D	Czech Republic	HC Budivelnyk	HC České Budějovice

=== 3rd round ===
Rank	Player	Position	Nationality	Drafted by	Drafted from
49	Mika Partanen	A	Finland	Metallurg Novokuznetsk	HIFK Helsinki
50	Vladislav Shalimov	A	Russia	Vityaz Chekhov	Vityaz Chekhov 93
51	Ilya Nekolenko	D	Russia	Amur Khabarovsk	MHK Krylia Sovetov
52	Danil Faizullin	D	Russia	Neftekhimik Nizhnekamsk	Ak Bars Kazan 93
53	Sergey Shestakov	A	Russia	Avtomobilist Yekaterinburg	Sputnik Nizhny Tagil
54	Tomáš Klíma	A	Slovakia	SKA Saint Petersburg	HC Dukla Trencin
55	Aleksey Skabelka	A	Belarus	Dynamo Minsk	HK Gomel 2
56	Adam Nagy	G	Slovakia	Severstal Cherepovets	HC Dukla Trencin
57	Leonid Belenski	D	Russia	CSKA Moscow	Vityaz Chekhov 93
58	Timofei Tankeyev	A	Russia	Barys Astana	St. Louis Blues Jr.
59	Edgars Lipsbergs	A	Latvia	Dinamo Riga	Topeka Roadrunners
60	Nikita Kucherov	A	Russia	CSKA Moscow	CSKA Moscow 93
61	Dmitri Arkhipov	A	Russia	Ak Bars Kazan	Ak Bars Kazan 93
62	Igor Levitski	A	Russia	Atlant Mytishchi	Krasnaya Armia Moscow
63	Roman Horák	A	Czech Republic	Neftekhimik Nizhnekamsk	Chilliwack Bruins
64	Aleksandr Kadeykin	A	Russia	Atlant Mytishchi	Kristall Elektrostal
65	Bulat Baykeyev	A	Russia	Neftekhimik Nizhnekamsk	Ak Bars Kazan 93
66	Oleg Zheleznov	D	Russia	Ak Bars Kazan	Ak Bars Kazan 93
67	Vladislav Vorobiev	A	Russia	Lokomotiv Yaroslavl	Lokomotiv Iaroslavl 93
68	Johan Sundström	C	Sweden	HC Budivelnyk	Frölunda HC
69	Ilya Chipov	A	Russia	UHC Dynamo	Dynamo Moscow 93
70	Yaroslav Kosov	A	Russia	Metallurg Magnitogorsk	Metallurg Magnitogorsk 93
71	Tomáš Voráček	D	Czech Republic	SKA Saint Petersburg	HC Vítkovice
72	Sebastian Wennström	A	Sweden	Salavat Yulaev Ufa	Brynäs IF

=== 4th round ===
Rank	Player	Position	Nationality	Drafted by	Drafted from
73	Fredrik Pettersson-Wentzel	G	Sweden	Yugra Khanty-Mansiysk	Almtuna IS
74	Tomáš Doležal	C	Czech Republic	HC Budivelnyk	HC Slavia Praha
75	Yevgeni Poltorak	A	Russia	Traktor Chelyabinsk	Traktor Chelyabinsk 93
76	Vladimir Pechekhonov	A	Russia	Spartak Moscow	Spartak Moscow 93
77	Aleksandr Repin	C	Russia	Metallurg Novokuznetsk	Ak Bars Kazan
78	Nikita Glotov	D	Russia	Vityaz Chekhov	Vityaz Chekhov 93
79	Nikita Ignatiev	A	Russia	Amur Khabarovsk	Krylia Sovetov 93
80	Marek Viedenský	C	Slovakia	Neftekhimik Nizhnekamsk	Saskatoon Blades
81	Denis Vassilenkov	A	Russia	Avtomobilist Yekaterinburg	Sputnik Nizhny Tagil
82	Oleg Petrov	G	Russia	Traktor Chelyabinsk	Traktor Chelyabinsk 93
83	Evgeni Leonov	D	Belarus	Dynamo Minsk	HK Vitebsk 2
84	Oleg Dyatlov	G	Russia	Avtomobilist Yekaterinburg	Avtomobilist Yekaterinburg 93
85	Vsevolod Kondrachov	G	Russia	Severstal Cherepovets	Feniks Voskresensk
86	Pavel Makhanovski	A	Russia	Avangard Omsk	Avangard Omsk 93
87	Kristian Skalin	A	Russia	Severstal Cherepovets	Traktor Chelyabinsk 93
88	Olivier Bellavance-Roy	G	Canada	Barys Astana	Cape Breton Screaming Eagles
89	Victor Rask	C	Sweden	Dinamo Riga	Leksands IF
90	Nino Niederreiter	AD	Switzerland	Avangard Omsk	Portland Winter Hawks
91	Andrej Kudrna	A	Slovakia	Spartak Moscow	Red Deer Rebels
92	Andrey Sigarev	A	Russia	Sibir Novosibirsk	Sibirskie Snaypery Novosibirsk
93	Vladimir Nikonov	A	Russia	Severstal Cherepovets)	Khimik Voskresensk 93
94	Kamil Kamaliev	A	Russia	Ak Bars Kazan	Ak Bars Kazan 93
95	Roman Josi	D	Switzerland	Lokomotiv Yaroslavl	SC Bern
96	Egor Oseledets	G	Russia	CSKA Moscow	CSKA Moscow 93

=== 5th round ===
Rank	Player	Position	Nationality	Drafted by	Draften from
97	Mikhail Naumenkov	D	Russia	CSKA Moscow	CSKA Moscow 93
98	Maksim Kazakov	A	Russia	Avangard Omsk	Avangard Omsk 93
99	Aleksey Shestopalov	D	Russia	Atlant Mytichtchi	Krasnaya Armia Moscow
100	Anton Saveliev	D	Russia	Ak Bars Kazan	Ak Bars Kazan 93
101	Vassili Mosin	D	Russia	UHC Dinamo	Dynamo Moscow 93
102	Artyom Batrak	A	Russia	Spartak Moscow	Spartak Moscow 93
103	Evgeni Palenga	D	Russia	Spartak Moscow	Spartak Moscow 93
104	Roman Konkov	A	Russia	Torpedo Nizhny Novgorod	Torpedo Nizhny Novgorod
105	Sergey Shmeliov	A	Russia	Atlant Mytishchi	Bars Kazan
106	Danil Bikbulatov	A	Russia	Metallurg Magnitogorsk	Metallurg Magnitogorsk
107	Oleg Evenko	D	Belarus	Barys Astana	Fargo Force
108	Mattias Ekholm	D	Sweden	Salavat Yulaev Ufa	Brynäs IF
109	Kirill Belousov	D	Russia	Yugra Khanty-Mansiysk	Traktor Chelyabinsk 93
110	Denis Petrukhno	D	Ukraine	HC Budivelnyk	Springfield Blues Jr
111	Johan Larsson	A	Sweden	Metallurg Novokuznetsk	Brynäs J20
112	Aleksandr Serdyukov	G	Russia	Vityaz Chekhov	Vityaz Chekhov 93
113	Denis Gusev	D	Russia	Lokomotiv Yaroslavl	Lokomotiv Yaroslavl 93
114	Ian Shedrovski	A	Russia	Amur Khabarovsk	Traktor Chelyabinsk 93
115	Peter Čerešňák	D	Slovakia	Sibir Novosibirsk	HC Dukla Trencin
116	Semyon Garshin	A	Russia	Avtomobilist Yekaterinburg	Metallurg Magnitogorsk 93
117	Daniel Krejčí	D	Czech Republic	SKA Saint Petersburg	HC Slavia Praha
118	Marek Hrivík	A	Slovakia	Salavat Yulaev Ufa	Moncton Wildcats
119	Aleksey Bazanov	A	Russia	Severstal Cherepovets	Khimik Voskresensk 93
120	Oleg Stanevich	D	Belarus	Torpedo Nizhny Novgorod	Khimik-SKA Novapolotsk

=== 6th round ===
Rank	Player	Position	Nationality	Drafted by	Drafted from
121	Adam Jánošík	D	Slovakia	Barys Astana	Gatineau Olympiques
122	Niklas Lucenius	C	Finland	Dinamo Riga	Tappara Tampere
123	Nikita Soshnikov	A	Russia	Atlant Mytishchi	Atlant Mytishchi 93
124	Igor Fefelov	A	Russia	CSKA Moscow	CSKA Moscow 93
125	Valentin Milyukov	D	Kazakhstan	Avangard Omsk	Kazzinc-Torpedo Ust-Kamenogorsk
126	Denis Blokhin	A	Russia	Spartak Moscow	MHK Krylia Sovetov 93
127	Maksim Ivanov	D	Russia	Neftekhimik Nizhnekamsk	Ak Bars Kazan 93
128	Albert Yarullin	D	Russia	Ak Bars Kazan	Ak Bars Kazan 93
129	Mika Zibanejad	A	Sweden	Lokomotiv Yaroslavl	Djurgården Hockey
130	Igor Omelianenko	A	Russia	Atlant Mytishchi	Spartak Moscow 93
131	Vladimir Dyachenko	A	Russia	UHC Dynamo	Dynamo Moscow 93
132	Patrik Nemeth	D	Sweden	Metallurg Magnitogorsk	AIK IF
133	Marcus Johansson	A	Sweden	SKA Saint Petersburg	Färjestads BK
134	Aleksey Vassilevski	D	Russia	Salavat Yulaev Ufa	Salavat yulaev Ufa
135	Anton Terentiev	D	Russia	Yugra Khanty-Mansiysk	Gazovik Tyumen
136	Tomáš Filippi	C	Czech Republic	HC Budivelnyk	HC Liberec
137	Daniil Metlyuk	A	Russia	Metallurg Novokuznetsk	Lada Tolyatti 93
138	Aleksandr Kuvayev	A	Russia	Vityaz Chekhov	Vityaz Chekhov
139	Aleksandr Pronin	D	Russia	Amur Khabarovsk	Spartak Moscow 93
140	Julius Junttila	A	Finland	Sibir Novosibirsk	Kärpät Oulu
141	Tomáš Jurčo	A	Slovakia	Avtomobilist Yekaterinburg	HC Košice
142	Nikita Glukov	D	Russia	Traktor Chelyabinsk	Traktor Chelyabinsk
143	Dmitri Zhevlochenko	D	Belarus	Dynamo Minsk	Keramin Minsk 2
144	Aleksey Shamolin	A	Russia	Severstal Cherepovets	Khimik Voskresensk 93

=== 7th round ===
Rank	Player	Position	Nationality	Drafted by	Drafted from
145	Andrey Goryachiov	D	Russia	Torpedo Nizhny Novgorod	Avangard Omsk
146	Denis Chaltsev	G	Russia	Barys Astana
147	Kristers Gudļevskis	G	Latvia	Dinamo Riga	HK Ozolnieki
148	Nikita Mokin	D	Kazakhstan	Avangard Omsk	Kazzinc-Torpedo Ust-Kamenogorsk
149	Anton Lander	C	Sweden	Spartak Moscow	Timrå IK
150	Kirill Gordeev	A	Russia	Neftekhimik Nizhnekamsk	Ak Bars Kazan
151	Leonid Sukhoruchkin	D	Russia	Salavat Yulaev Ufa	Salavat Yulaev Ufa
152	Azat Mazitov	D	Russia	Salavat Yulaev Ufa	Salavat Yulaev Ufa
153	Anton Yefremov	D	Russia	Neftekhimik Nizhnekamsk	Neftekhimik Nizhnekamsk
154	Nikita Tsarenok	D	Russia	Ak Bars Kazan	HK CSKA Moscou
155	Jerry D'Amigo	AD	United States	Lokomotiv Yaroslavl	R.P.I.
156	Sergey Zavgorodni	D	Russia	Avangard Omsk	Avangard Omsk
157	Ilya Dekalo	D	Russia	Atlant Mytishchi	Avangard Omsk 93
158	Vladimir Mitrokhin	A	Russia	UHC Dynamo	Dynamo Moscow 93
159	Rasmus Rissanen	D	Finland	Metallurg Magnitogorsk	Everett Silvertips
160	Erik Haula	AG	Finland	SKA Saint Petersburg	Omaha Lancers
161	Valeri Poliakov	A	Russia	Salavat Yulaev Ufa	Salavat Yulaev Ufa
162	Denis Petrakov	A	Russia	Avtomobilist Yekaterinburg	Salavat Yulaev Ufa
163	Dannil Yusherov	A	Russia	Yugra Khanty-Mansiysk	Traktor Chelyabinsk
164	Eero Elo	AG	Finland	HC Budivelnyk	Lukko Rauma
165	John Westin	A	Sweden	Metallurg Novokuznetsk	MODO hockey
166	Konstantin Vorshin	A	Russia	Vityaz Chekhov	Vityaz Chekhov
167	Sergey Smurnov	A	Russia	Amur Khabarovsk	Amour Khabarovsk 2
168	Lukáš Tsingel	D	Slovakia	Avtomobilist Yekaterinburg
169	Tyler Toffoli	A	Canada	Traktor Chelyabinsk	Ottawa 67's
170	Jack Campbell	G	United States	Dynamo Minsk	USA National Development Team
171	Matej Makovský	G	Czech Republic	Severstal Cherepovets	HC Opava
172	Anton Vitkov	A	Russia	Torpedo Nizhny Novgorod	Khimik Voskresensk
173	Gennadi Sabinin	D	Russia	Vityaz Chekhov	Vityaz Chekhov
174	Danil Semian	A	Russia	Barys Astana	Serebriany Akouly Moscow
175	Kristiāns Pelšs	A	Latvia	Dinamo Riga	CK Riga
176	Sami Aittokallio	G	Finland	CSKA Moscow	Ilves Tampere
177	Aleksandr Lysyuk	A	Russia	Avangard Omsk
178	Oscar Lindberg	C	Sweden	Spartak Moscow	Skellefteå AIK
179	Vsevolod Yakhont	D	Russia	Neftekhimik Nizhnekamsk	Molot Prikamie Perm
180	Aleksandr Pavlinich	A	Russia	Salavat Yulaev Ufa	Salavat Yulaev Ufa
181	Bulat Khammatov	A	Russia	Ak Bars Kazan	Salavat Yulaev Ufa
182	Maksim Namruyev	A	Russia	Atlant Mytishchi	Gazovik Tyumen
183	Artjoms Dachoutins	A	Lithuania	UHC Dynamo	CK Riga
184	Jarred Tinordi	D	United States	Metallurg Magnitogorsk	USA National Development Team
185	Benjamin Conz	G	Switzerland	SKA Saint Petersburg	SC Langnau Tigers
186	Tim Erixon	D	Sweden	Salavat Yulaev Ufa	Skellefteå AIK
187	Maksim Yashkin	A	Russia	Yugra Khanty-Mansiysk	HC Vsetín
188	Petr Mrázek	G	Czech Republic	HC Budivelnyk	Ottawa 67's

== See also ==
- 2010–11 KHL season
- 2010 NHL entry draft
- KHL territorial pick
