= 2011 KHL Junior Draft =

Ice hockey draft

General information
- Date: 28 May 2011
- Location: Moscow, Russia

Overview
- League: KHL
- First selection: (Russia) Anton Slepyshev; Selected by: Metallurg Novokuznetsk

The 2011 KHL Junior Draft was the third entry draft held by the Kontinental Hockey League (KHL), taking place on 28 May 2011 in Mytishchi Arena. Ice hockey players from around the world aged between 17 and 21 years of age were selected. Players eligible to take part in the draft were required to not have an active contract with a KHL, MHL or VHL team. A total of 371 players participated in the draft, 171 of these playing in Russia, 100 in Europe and 100 in North America.

== Top prospects ==
Ranking	North American skaters	European skaters	Russian skaters
1	(Canada) Ryan Nugent-Hopkins (C)	(Sweden) Gabriel Landeskog (LW)	Mikhail Grigorenko (C)
2	(Canada) Jonathan Huberdeau (C)	(Finland) Joel Armia (RW)	Anton Slepyshev (LW)
3	(Canada) Nathan Beaulieu (D)	(Sweden) Calle Järnkrok (C)	Aleksandr Timiryov (RW)
4	(Canada) Sean Couturier (C)	(Switzerland) Sven Bärtschi (LW)	Bogdan Yakimov (C)
5	(Canada) Ryan Murphy (D)	(Sweden) Jonas Brodin (D)	Vadim Khlopotov (C)
6	(Canada) Dougie Hamilton (D)	(Sweden) Oscar Klefbom (D)	Vyacheslav Osnovin (C)
7	(Canada) Ryan Strome (C)	(Finland) Miikka Salomäki (C)	Arseni Khatsey (C)
8	(Canada) Duncan Siemens (D)	(Finland) Markus Granlund (C)	Valeri Vasiliev (D)
9	(United States) Charlie Coyle (RW)	(Sweden) Rickard Rakell (RW)	Pavel Makarenko (D)
10	(Canada) Mark McNeill (C)	(Sweden) Patrick Cehlin (RW)	Timur Schyngareyev (RW)

Ranking	North American goalies	European goalies	Russian goalies
1	(United States) John Gibson	(Finland) Christopher Gibson	Andrei Vasilevski
2	(Canada) Louis Domingue	(Finland) Samu Perhonen	Igor Ustynski
3	(Canada) Jordan Binnington	(Czech Republic) Matěj Machovský	Ivan Nalimov

Notes:

- 1. The KHL considers European players as being European-born players not born in Russia, regardless of their current team.

== Selections by round ==
=== Round one ===
Rank	Player	Position	Nationality	KHL team	Drafted from
1	Anton Slepyshev	LW	Russia	Metallurg Novokuznetsk	Dizel Penza 2 (Pervaya Liga)
2	Igor Ichayev	F	Russia	Amur Khabarovsk	Amurskie Tigry (MHL)
3	Alexander Timirev	RW	Russia	CSKA Moscow	Gazovik Tyumen
4	Iegor Malenkikh	D	Russia	SKA Saint Petersburg	Gazovik Tyumen
5	Jonathan Huberdeau	C	Canada	Vityaz Chekhov	Saint John Sea Dogs (QMJHL)
6	Vyacheslav Osnovin	C	Russia	Traktor Chelyabinsk	Traktor Chelyabinsk
7	Andrei Vasilevski	G	Russia	Salavat Yulaev Ufa	Tolpar (MHL)
8	Mikhail Grigorenko	C	Russia	CSKA Moscow	Krasnaya Armia (MHL)
9	Arseni Khatsey	C	Russia	Atlant Moscow Oblast	HC Spartak Moscow
10	Anders Nilsson	G	Sweden	Dinamo Minsk	Luleå HF
11	Vladislav Namestnikov	C	Russia	Torpedo Nizhny Novgorod	London Knights (OHL)
12	Ivan Nalimov	G	Russia	SKA Saint Petersburg	Metallurg Novokuznetsk
13	Anatoli Riabov	C	Russia	Torpedo Nizhny Novgorod	Gazovik Tyumen
14	Joel Armia	RW	Finland	Severstal Cherepovets	Ässät
15	Valeri Kniazev	F	Russia	HC Sibir	HC Berounští Medvědi
16	Gabriel Landeskog	LW	Sweden	Salavat Yulaev Ufa	Kitchener Rangers
17	Pavel Makarenko	D	Russia	SKA Saint Petersburg	HC Spartak Moscow
18	Artur Gavrus	F	Belarus	Atlant Moscow Oblast	HK Nyoman Hrodna
19	Daniyar Kairov	D	Kazakhstan	SKA Saint Petersburg	Kazzinc-Torpedo
20	Oscar Klefbom	D	Sweden	Salavat Yulaev Ufa	Färjestads BK
21	Igor Ustynski	G	Russia	Metallurg Magnitogorsk	Gazovik Tyumen
22	Jerry Kaukinen	G	Finland	Ak Bars Kazan	Lukko
23	Teuvo Teräväinen	F	Finland	Lokomotiv Yaroslavl	Jokerit
24	Markus Granlund	C	Finland	Salavat Yulaev Ufa	HIFK

=== Round 2 ===
Rank	Player	Position	Nationality	KHL team	Drafted from
25	Alex Galchenyuk	F	United States	Atlant Moscow Oblast	Sarnia Sting (OHL)
26	Marek Tvrdoň	F	Slovakia	HC Lev Poprad	Vancouver Giants (WHL)
27	Mark Skutar	D	Russia	Metallurg Novokuznetsk	HC Spartak Moscow
28	Zemgus Girgensons	F	Latvia	CSKA Moscow	Dubuque Fighting Saints (USHL)
29	Ilya Lyubushkin	D	Russia	Metallurg Novokuznetsk
30	Maxim Subbotin	F	Russia	Avtomobilist Yekaterinburg
31	Vadim Kholopotov	C	Russia	Lokomotiv Yaroslavl	Loko (MHL)
32	Bogdan Yakimov	C	Russia	Neftekhimik Nizhnekamsk	Neftekhimik Nizhnekamsk
33	Adam Almqvist	D	Sweden	CSKA Moscow	HV 71
34	Stanislav Gareyev	D	Russia	Salavat Yulaev Ufa	Salavat Yulaev Ufa
35	Igor Safaraleyev	F	Russia	Torpedo Nizhny Novgorod	Gazovik Tyumen
36	Miikka Salomäki	F	Finland	Dinamo Minsk	Kärpät
37	Tomáš Mikúš	F	Slovakia	Spartak Moscow	HK 36 Skalica
38	Dmitri Sinitsyn	D	Russia	Barys Astana	Stars Dallas U18
39	Teodors Bļugers	F	Latvia	Dinamo Riga	Shattuck St. Mary's (Midget)
40	Valeri Vassiliev	F	Russia	Spartak Moscow	Spartak Moscow
41	Filip Forsberg	F	Sweden	HC Sibir	Leksands IF
42	Joachim Nermark	C	Sweden	Salavat Yulaev Ufa	Linköpings HC
43	Calle Järnkrok	C	Sweden	Severstal Cherepovets	Brynäs IF
44	Mark Soliankin-Pasternak	D	Russia	Atlant Moscow Oblast
45	Miro Aaltonen	C	Finland	Atlant Moscow Oblast
46	Vassili Demtchenko	G	Russia	Traktor Chelyabinsk	Traktor Chelyabinsk
47	Alexei Filippov	A	Russia	Traktor Chelyabinsk	Traktor Chelyabinsk

=== Round 3 ===
Rank	Player	Position	Nationality	KHL team	Drafted from
48	Damir Galin	D	Russia	Metallurg Magnitogorsk	Bars (MHL)
49	Pavel Koledov	D	Russia	Metallurg Magnitogorsk	Sibirskie Snaypery (MHL)
50	Evgeni Erchov	D	Russia	Metallurg Magnitogorsk	Gazovik Tyumen 94
51	Christopher Gibson	G	Finland	Ak Bars Kazan	Chicoutimi Saguenéens (QMJHL)
52	Kirill Voronin	C	Russia	Lokomotiv Yaroslavl	Loko
53	Jonathan Johansson	F	Sweden	Salavat Yulaev Ufa	Brampton Battalion
54	Adam Pettersson	F	Sweden	Avangard Omsk	Skellefteå AIK
55	Ivan Petrakov	F	Russia	HC Lev Poprad	Vityaz Chekhov
56	Anton Ivaniuzhenkov	F	Russia	HC Lev Poprad	Vityaz Chekhov
57	Nikita Chpakov	F	Russia	HC Lev Poprad	Molot Prikamie Perm
58	Damir Zhafiarov	F	Russia	Metallurg Novokuznetsk	HK Rys
59	Pavel Khomtchenko	G	Russia	Lokomotiv Iaroslavl	Lokomotiv Iaroslavl
60	Mathew Dumba	D	Canada	Vityaz Chekhov	Red Deer Rebels
61	Nikita Tryamkin	D	Russia	Avtomobilist Yekaterinburg	Avtomobilist Yekaterinburg
62	Andrei Yermakov	D	Russia	Spartak Moscow	Spartak Moscow
63	Nikolai Kordyukov	F	Russia	Traktor Chelyabinsk	Traktor Chelyabinsk
64	Georgi Bussarov	C	Russia	Torpedo Nizhny Novgorod	Dizel Penza
65	Petter Granberg	D	Sweden	Dinamo Minsk	Skellefteå AIK
66	Evgeni Krutikov	F	Russia	Spartak Moscow	Spartak Moscow
67	Alexander Nikulnikov	F	Russia	Barys Astana
68	Alexander Ruuttu	F	Finland	Dinamo Riga	Jokerit
69	Yuri Kozlovski	D	Russia	Spartak Moscow	Spartak Moscow
70	Artem Antipov	F	Kazakhstan	HC Sibir	Junior Portland Pirates
71	Denis Mingaleyev	D	Russia	HC Yugra	Avtomobilist Yekaterinburg
72	Nikita Kramskoï	C	Russia	Severstal Cherepovets	CSKA Moscow
73	Dmitri Sidliarov	D	Russia	Atlant Moscow Oblast	Kristall Elektrostal
74	Jonas Brodin	F	Sweden	SKA Saint Petersburg	Färjestads BK

=== Round 4 ===
Rank	Player	Position	Nationality	KHL team	Drafted from
75	Ruslan Ibatulin	D	Russia	Metallurg Magnitogorsk	Salavat Yulaev Ufa
76	Alexander Yakovlev	F	Russia	Metallurg Magnitogorsk	Khimik Voskresensk
77	Maxim Kulagin	D	Russia	Metallurg Magnitogorsk	Khimik Voskresensk
78	Damir Musin	D	Russia	Ak Bars Kazan	Ak Bars Kazan
79	Samuel Guerra	F	Switzerland	Lokomotiv Yaroslavl	HC Davos
80	Rasmus Bengtsson	F	Sweden	Salavat Yulaïev Ufa	Rögle BK
81	Denis Vanin	D	Russia	Traktor Chelyabinsk	Traktor Chelyabinsk
82	Alexei Bereglazov	D	Russia	HC Lev Poprad	Metallurg Magnitogorsk
83	Vladlen Zakharov	D	Russia	HC Lev Poprad	Metallurg Magnitogorsk
84	Konstantin Chabunov	D	Russia	Metallurg Novokuznetsk	Spartak Moscow
85	Olli Määttä	F	Finland	SKA Saint Petersburg	D Team Jyväskylä
86	Elias Lindholm	C	Sweden	SKA Saint Petersburg	Brynäs IF
87	Roman Manukhov	F	Russia	Avtomobilist Yekaterinburg	Avtomobilist Yekaterinburg
88	Denis Kamayev	F	Russia	CSKA Moscow	Krasnaïa Armia (MHL)
89	Artem Chistiakov	D	Russia	Traktor Chelyabinsk	Traktor Chelyabinsk
90	Alexander Sorokhin	D	Russia	Torpedo Nizhny Novgorod	Ladia (MHL)
91	Joel Mustonen	C	Finland	Dinamo Minsk	Skellefteå AIK
92	Andrei Minkovitch	D	Russia	Neftekhimik Nizhnekamsk	Neftekhimik Nizhnekamsk
93	Evgeni Evseyev	F	Kazakhstan	Barys Astana	Kazzinc-Torpedo Ust-Kamenogorsk
94	Nikita Svintsitski	G	Russia	Torpedo Nizhny Novgorod	Ladia (MHL)
95	Sergei Alexeiev	F	Russia	Spartak Moscow	Krylia Sovetov
96	Mattias Bäckman	F	Sweden	Avangard Omsk	Linköpings HC
97	Nikita Voinov	F	Russia	HC Yugra	Traktor Tcheliabinsk
98	Daniil Yunychev	D	Russia	HC Yugra	Salavat Yulaev Ufa
99	Sergei Kuptsov	D	Russia	Severstal Cherepovets	Salavat Yulaev Ufa
100	Alexander Delnov	G	Russia	Atlant Moscow Oblast
101	Nikolai Skladnitchenko	G	Russia	Barys Astana

=== Round 5 ===
Rank	Player	Position	Nationality	KHL team	Drafted from
102	Dmitri Uvarov	D	Russia	OHK Dinamo	Spartak Moscow
103	Andrei Mironov	D	Russia	OHK Dinamo	OHK Dinamo
104	Ilya Khokhlov	D	Russia	Metallourg Magnitogorsk	OHK Dinamo
105	Nikita Lisov	F	Ukraine	CSKA Moscow	Krylia Sovetov
106	Ryan Murphy	F	Canada	Lokomotiv Yaroslavl	Kitchener Rangers
107	Filipp Panguelov-Yuldachev	D	Russia	Salavat Yulaev Ufa	Tolpar (MHL)
108	Pathrik Westerholm	C	Sweden	Avangard Omsk	Malmö Redhawks
109	Jakub Jeřábek	A	Czech Republic	HC Lev Poprad	HC Plzeň 1929
110	Evgeni Ivantchik	D	Russia	Vityaz Chekhov	Vityaz Chekhov
111	Ryan Strome	C	Canada	Amur Khabarovsk	Niagara IceDogs (OHL)
112	Mark McNeill	C	Canada	Vityaz Chekhov	Prince Albert Raiders
113	Denis Fedorov	C	Russia	Avtomobilist Yekaterinburg	Salavat Yulaev Ufa
114	Edouard Guimatov	D	Russia	Avtomobilist Yekaterinburg	Salavat Yulaïev Ufa
115	Dmitri Ogurstov	D	Russia	CSKA Moscow	CSKA Moscow
116	Stanislav Petrov	D	Russia	Traktor Chelyabinsk	Traktor Chelyabinsk
117	Pavel Khanov	G	Russia	Torpedo Nizhni Novgorod	Neftianik Almetievsk
118	Sondre Olden	C	Norway	Dinamo Minsk	MODO Hockey
119	Arseni Yerokhin	D	Russia	Neftekhimik Nizhnekamsk	Salavat Yulaev Ufa
120	Stefan Roman	D	Kazakhstan	Barys Astana	Kazzinc-Torpedo
121	Jarrod Rabey	F	United States	Dinamo Riga	Indiana Ice
122	Nikita Kvartalnov	G	Russia	Spartak Moscow	Almaz (MHL)
123	Anton Zhitnikov	C	Russia	Spartak Moscow	Kristall Elektrostal
124	Sebastian Collberg	F	Sweden	Avangard Omsk	Frölunda HC
125	Ilya Nikolayev	F	Russia	Ak Bars Kazan	Ak Bars Kazan
126	Daniel Pribyl	C	Czech Republic	Severstal Cherepovets	HC Sparta Prague
127	Ivan Ivanov	D	Russia	Vityaz Tchekhov	Vityaz Tchekhov

=== Round 6 ===
Rank	Player	Position	Nationality	KHL team	Drafted from
128	Toms Andersons	D	Latvia	Dinamo Riga	SenSee
129	Kirill Maslov	F	Russia	OHK Dinamo	OHK Dinamo
130	Timur Chingareyev	RW	Russia	Metallurg Magnitogorsk	Stalnye Lissy (MHL)
131	Nikolai Vladimirov	F	Russia	Ak Bars Kazan	Ak Bars Kazan
132	Robbie Russo	D	United States	Lokomotiv Yaroslavl	US NTDP
133	Sean Couturier	A	Canada	Salavat Yulaev Ufa	Drummondville Voltigeurs
134	Jyrki Jokipakka	D	Finland	Avangard Omsk	Ilves
135	Passed	-	-	HC Lev Poprad	–

== See also ==
- KHL territorial pick
