= Kontinental Hockey League team changes =

Changes in the Kontinental Hockey League

From the league's inception in 2008 there have always been team changes in the Kontinental Hockey League between seasons, as some new teams have joined the league or others have left it. There is no promotion/relegation system with the VHL in place like there was with the Superleague and Vysshaya Liga. The number of teams in the league stayed at 24 throughout the first two seasons. In the third season the number of teams was reduced to 23 because Budivelnyk, a team that planned to join the league, dropped out before the start of the season. Initially, Lev Poprad replaced Budivelnyk to retain the number of teams at 24. However, Lev was excluded by the KHL before the start of that season, but would be accepted into the league for 2011–12. The league plans to expand this number for future seasons.

The inaugural season of KHL included all 20 teams of the 2007–08 Russian Superleague. Non–Russian teams Barys Astana, Dinamo Riga and Dinamo Minsk also joined the newly formed league. Likewise, the recreated team of Khimik Voskresensk, the champion of the 2007–08 season of the Major League, joined. Thus the initial number of teams was 24.

== Team changes by season ==
Season	Teams left the league	Fate of the team	Teams joined the league	Whence	Number of teams in the league
2008–09	inaugural season of competition				24
2009–10	(Russia) Khimik	Joined VHL	(Russia) Avtomobilist	VHL	24
2010–11	(Russia) Lada	Joined VHL	(Russia) UHC Dynamo	Newly created team by merger of Dynamo and MVD	23
2010–11	(Russia) Dynamo M	Merged with MVD to form UHC Dynamo	(Russia) Yugra	VHL	23
2010–11	(Russia) MVD	Merged with Dynamo to form UHC Dynamo			23
2011–12	(Russia) Lokomotiv	Scratched from season due to plane crash	(Slovakia) Lev Poprad	Newly created team	23
2012–13	(Slovakia) Lev Poprad	Disbanded	(Slovakia) Slovan	Slovak Extraliga	26
2012–13			(Ukraine) Donbass	VHL	26
2012–13			(Russia) Lokomotiv	Returned to KHL after plane tragedy	26
2012–13			(Czech Republic) Lev Praha	Newly created team	26
2013–14			(Russia) Admiral	Newly created team	28
2013–14			(Croatia) Medveščak	Austrian EBEL	28
2014–15	(Ukraine) Donbass	Joined the Ukrainian Hockey Extra League prior to the 2015–16 season, after one year of inactivity.	(Russia) Lada Togliatti	Returned to the league	28
2014–15	(Czech Republic) Lev Praha	Disbanded	(Finland) Jokerit	Liiga	28
2014–15	(Russia) Spartak Moscow	Took one year off due to financial issues	(Russia) HC Sochi	Newly created team	28
2015–16	(Russia) Atlant	Folded due to financial issues.	(Russia) Spartak Moscow	Returned to the league	28
2016–17			(China) HC Kunlun Red Star	Newly created team	29
2017–18	(Croatia) Medveščak	Returned to Austrian EBEL			27
2017–18	(Russia) Metallurg Novokuznetsk	Joined VHL			27
2018–19	(Russia) Lada	Rejoined VHL			25
2018–19	(Russia) Yugra	Joined VHL			25
2019–20	(Slovakia) Slovan	Left league due to financial issues to attempt to rejoin Slovak Extraliga			24
2020–21	(Russia) Admiral	Took hiatus due to financial issues			23
2021–22	(Latvia) Dinamo Riga (Finland) Jokerit	Left the league due to the Russian invasion of Ukraine	(Russia) Admiral	Return to league after COVID-19 break	22
2022–23	no changes				22
2023–24			(Russia) Lada	Returned to the league	23
2024–25	(Russia) Vityaz	Disbanded			22
2025–26	(China) HC Kunlun Red Star	Relocation	(China) Shanghai Dragons	Relocation	22

== Division lineup changes ==
Season	Divisions							
Season	Bobrov		Tarasov		Kharlamov		Chernyshev	
Season	Joined division	Left division	Joined division	Left division	Joined division	Left division	Joined division	Left division
2008–09 (initial composition)	(Russia) Atlant (Belarus) Dinamo Mn (Russia) Metallurg Nk (Russia) Salavat Yulaev (Russia) Severstal (Russia) Spartak		(Russia) CSKA (Russia) Khimik (Russia) Metallurg Mg (Russia) HC MVD (Russia) SKA (Russia) Traktor		(Russia) Amur (Russia) Avangard (Latvia) Dinamo R (Russia) Lada (Russia) Lokomotiv (Russia) Sibir		(Russia) Ak Bars (Kazakhstan) Barys (Russia) Dynamo M (Russia) Neftekhimik (Russia) Torpedo (Russia) Vityaz	
2009–10 (geographical realignment)	(Russia) CSKA (Latvia) Dinamo R (Russia) Dynamo M (Russia) SKA	(Russia) Atlant (Russia) Metallurg Nk (Russia) Salavat Yulaev (Russia) Severstal	(Russia) Atlant (Russia) Lokomotiv (Russia) Severstal (Russia) Torpedo (Russia) Vityaz	(Russia) CSKA (Russia) Khimik (Russia) Metallurg Mg (Russia) SKA (Russia) Traktor	(Russia) Ak Bars (Russia) Avtomobilist (Russia) Metallurg Mg (Russia) Neftekhimik (Russia) Traktor	(Russia) Amur (Russia) Avangard (Latvia) Dinamo R (Russia) Lokomotiv (Russia) Sibir	(Russia) Amur (Russia) Avangard (Russia) Metallurg Nk (Russia) Salavat Yulaev (Russia) Sibir	(Russia) Ak Bars (Russia) Dynamo M (Russia) Neftekhimik (Russia) Torpedo (Russia) Vityaz
2010–11	(Russia) UHC Dynamo	(Belarus) Dinamo Mn (Russia) Dynamo M	(Belarus) Dinamo Mn	(Russia) HC MVD	(Russia) Yugra	(Russia) Lada		
2011–12	(Slovakia) Lev Poprad			(Russia) Lokomotiv				
2012–13	(Ukraine) Donbass (Czech Republic) Lev Praha (Slovakia) Slovan (Russia) Vityaz	(Russia) CSKA (Slovakia) Lev Poprad (Russia) Spartak	(Russia) CSKA (Russia) Lokomotiv (Russia) Spartak	(Russia) Vityaz				
2013–14	(Russia) CSKA (Belarus) Dinamo Mn (Croatia) Medveščak	(Ukraine) Donbass (Russia) Dynamo M (Russia) Vityaz	(Ukraine) Donbass (Russia) Dynamo M (Russia) Vityaz	(Russia) CSKA (Belarus) Dinamo Mn (Russia) Torpedo	(Russia) Torpedo		(Russia) Admiral	
2014–15	(Russia) Atlant (Finland) Jokerit	(Russia) CSKA (Czech Republic) Lev Praha	(Russia) CSKA (Russia) HC Sochi (Russia) Torpedo	(Russia) Atlant (Ukraine) Donbass (Russia) Spartak Moscow	(Russia) Lada	(Russia) Torpedo		
2015–16	(Russia) Spartak M	(Russia) Atlant						
2016–17							(China) HC Red Star Kunlun	
2017–18		(Croatia) Medveščak						(Russia) Metallurg Nk
2018–19	(Russia) Dynamo M (Russia) Severstal	(Belarus) Dinamo Mn (Slovakia) Slovan	(Belarus) Dinamo Mn (Slovakia) Slovan	(Russia) Torpedo (Russia) Dynamo M (Russia) Severstal	(Russia) Torpedo	(Russia) Lada (Russia) Yugra		
2019–20			(Russia) Torpedo	(Slovakia) Slovan	(Russia) Sibir	(Russia) Torpedo		(Russia) Sibir
2020–21	(Russia) HC Sochi (Russia) Vityaz	(Latvia) Dinamo R (Russia) Dynamo M	(Latvia) Dinamo R (Russia) Dynamo M	(Russia) HC Sochi (Russia) Torpedo (Russia) Vityaz	(Russia) Torpedo	(Russia) Sibir	(Russia) Sibir	(Russia) Admiral
2021–22	(Russia) Torpedo	(Russia) Severstal	(Russia) Severstal		(China) HC Red Star Kunlun	(Russia) Torpedo	(Russia) Admiral	(China) HC Red Star Kunlun
