= Territorial pick =

Territorial pick may refer to:

- KHL territorial pick
- NBA territorial pick
