= Maxim Alyapkin =

Russian ice hockey player (born 1993)

- Born: February 28, 1993 (age 32) Podolsk, Russia
- Height: 6 ft 0 in (183 cm)
- Weight: 170 lb (77 kg; 12 st 2 lb)
- Position: Goaltender
- Catches: Left
- VHL team Former teams: Buran Voronezh; Torpedo Nizhny Novgorod
- NHL draft: Undrafted
- Playing career: 2013–present

Maxim Alyapkin (born February 28, 1993) is a Russian ice hockey goaltender. He is currently playing with Buran Voronezh of the Supreme Hockey League (VHL).

Alyapkin was selected 4th overall by HC Vityaz Podolsk in the 2010 KHL Junior Draft. On January 13, 2015, Alyapkin made his Kontinental Hockey League debut playing with Torpedo Nizhny Novgorod during the 2014–15 KHL season, playing a total of three games for the team.
