= Potential Kontinental Hockey League expansion =

The potential of including additional franchises to the Kontinental Hockey League (KHL) has been an ongoing topic since the league's inception. In June 2012, the league presented a plan that would see expansion to as many as 64 teams in up to 22 countries. It has later been stated that the league only can comprise 32 teams, because of problems with logistics with more teams.

== Proposed pan-European league ==
United Hockey Europe was the first proposed pan-European ice hockey league. It was announced at the International Ice Hockey Federation's September 2009 congress by Alexander Medvedev, president of the Kontinental Hockey League (KHL).

The proposed league would have consisted of two conferences split into four divisions. The current KHL would have made up one of the conferences. The other conference would have been composed of a Scandinavian division and a Central European division. The winners of the two conferences would have played each other for the overall championship.

The proposal of June 2012 at the International Hockey Forum in Barcelona was an updated version of this plan, that would see two conferences of 32 teams each, playing a 62-game regular schedule followed by five rounds of playoffs.

The KHL would essentially replace the current model of European hockey based on promotion and relegation within national systems, supplemented by an international tournament, most recently the Champions Hockey League, and replace it with a system of franchises much like that of the North American National Hockey League (NHL).

== Central and Western Europe ==
The Czech Republic's HC Energie Karlovy Vary signed letters of intent with the KHL in 2008 and hoped to begin playing in the 2009–10 season. However, they had to annul plans to join the league due to the 2008 financial crisis.

German teams Eisbären Berlin and Kölner Haie have been approached by the KHL but are currently not considering joining the league. The KHL also wants to expand to Austria by affiliating EC Red Bull Salzburg. SKA Saint Petersburg General manager Barry Smith said that an affiliation may be possible in three or four years. Red Bull and team owner Dietrich Mateschitz, however, favours playing in the German Deutsche Eishockey Liga.

Italian hockey club Hockey Milano Rossoblu was slated to join the KHL in the 2012–13 season but the move was delayed due to a small arena, tight finances and the club being too underdeveloped. In October 2012, they indicated plans intending to join in 2013–14. There has been doubt about Milano's accession to KHL, as the negotiations have lasted several years. However, both KHL and Milano are still positive to accession, concluded from a meeting in February 2014.

A group from Switzerland was interested in starting an expansion team in Huttwil for the 2014–15 season.

The owners of Polish club Olivia, based in Gdańsk, have applied in January 2013 for a new team, Oliva Gdansk, to join the KHL and play home games at Ergo Arena.

In September 2016, KHL president Dmitry Chernyshenko stated, while they were still negotiating with a new team from London, there were also requests from Milan, Dresden and Geneva.

== Northern Europe ==
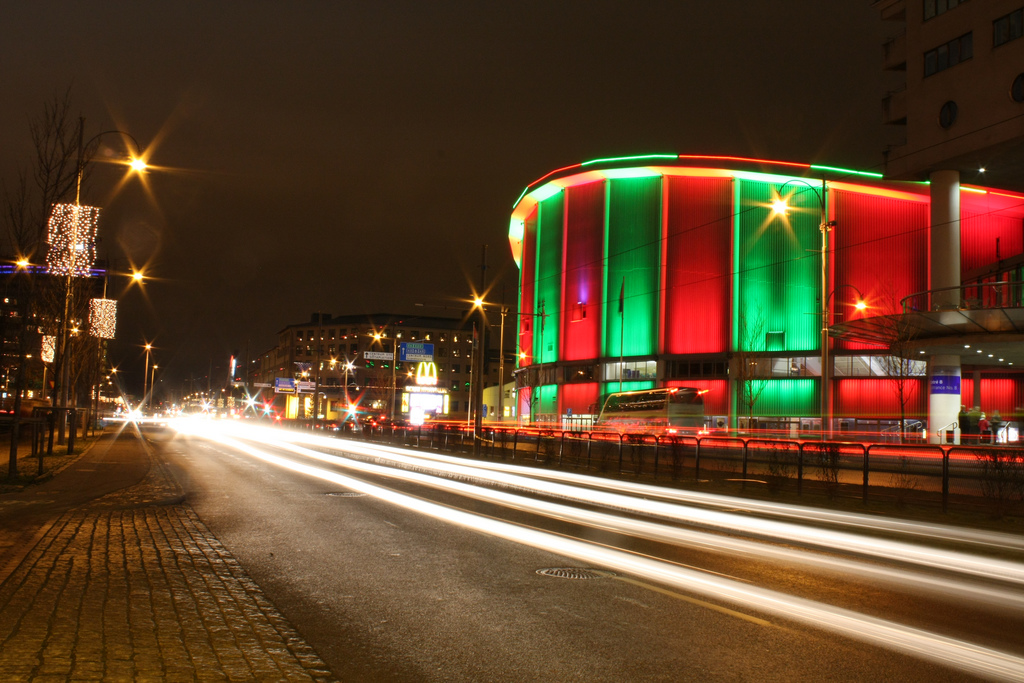
Scandinavium in Gothenburg has hosted the World Championships in 1981 and 2002.

On 28 April 2009, it was reported that Swedish teams HV71, Linköpings HC, Färjestad BK, Frölunda HC and Djurgårdens IF (of which Färjestad and Frölunda have had offers previously from the KHL) had terminated their shareholders' agreements with Elitserien (now named the Swedish Hockey League or SHL). This caused speculation as to whether they wanted to join the KHL or create a new league as an expansion of the Nordic Trophy. None of the clubs officially said that they wanted to stop playing in the Elitserien, although the seven remaining clubs drew such conclusions. The quarrel was resolved on 16 November 2011, when the plans were officially put down. All clubs agreed to continue their operation in Elitserien.

It is possible that the KHL will have a new team from Vilnius, Lithuania. In Autumn of 2009, KHL's SKA Saint Petersburg and Ak Bars Kazan played an exhibition game there, with more such games likely in the future. The main hurdles to be overcome for bringing a team there is funding, as well as the fact that basketball is a more popular sport in the region. The team would be called Vėtra Vilnius, and would be an expansion of the Sports Association Vėtra.

In November 2009, the KHL and AIK IF from Stockholm, Sweden (at that time playing in the HockeyAllsvenskan) signed a document inviting AIK to become a member of the KHL, and join the league beginning in the 2010–11 season, provided that AIK observed all the terms and conditions, and met all KHL admission criteria. AIK's interest was largely due to the club's serious financial problems at that time, however, in the end, AIK were unable to join after the plan was rejected by the Swedish Ice Hockey Association. Later during the 2009–10 season, AIK were promoted back to the top Swedish league, which stabilized their finances for the time being. In January 2016, SIHA manager Mikael Lundström stated that they're stopping all Swedish teams from joining the KHL. According to Russia Today News, Finnish team Kärpät from Liiga was also interested. Another real candidate from Finland may have been the Espoo Blues, but they went bankrupt at the end of the 2015–16 Liiga season.

In March 2016, information reached media about plans to form a team in Sweden-the Crowns-that intended to join the KHL for the 2016–17 season. Their plan was to hold the matches in Malmö, Oslo, Copenhagen, Lillehammer and Stockholm. However, IIHF CEO René Fasel stated that as long as the national federation is against KHL play, the IIHF will not approve new KHL teams from that nation. This made the Crowns' plan impossible, as the SIHA rejects any KHL participation from Swedish teams; the Ice Hockey Federation of Russia also did not approve.

== Eastern Europe ==
The Belarus Ice Hockey Federation has announced that it plans to include up to four Belarusian teams in the KHL, with league VP Vladimir Shalaev confirming the prospect of adding a second Belarusian KHL team for the 2009–10 season. Of these, Yunost Minsk, along with HK Gomel (which may relocate to Babruysk due to arena complications) of the Belarusian Extraleague, are actively taking steps to join the KHL.

Ukraine's Sokil Kiev has attempted to join, but financial issues have delayed a bid. They have a new 12,000-seat arena due in 2012 and are currently in negotiation with the KHL to join in the near future. President of the Hockey Federation of Ukraine, Anatoliy Brezvin, stated "I can not say under what brand it will be [...] Sokil, HC Kiev or some other. But there is some agreement that the next season will be [a] team from Ukraine, with Ukrainian players in the KHL." Also from Kiev, the expansion HC Budivelnyk had signed letters of intent and planned on joining the KHL for the 2010–11 season, but support fell through due to bureaucratic complications with the arena. Budivelnyk had even signed several players and personnel in order to ice a team for the coming season. HC Berkut has stated its goals are to build a new arena and join the KHL.

Russian team Krylya Sovetov were interested to join the league for the 2010–11 season; however, after 2011 they were not able to continue to operate as a professional hockey club and withdrew from the championship on all levels.

== Central Asia ==
=== Kazakhstan ===
Kazzinc-Torpedo, currently playing in the Supreme Hockey League, has been in negotiations to join the KHL. The club, formerly known as Torpedo Ust-Kamenogorsk, used to play in the highest division during the Soviet era. Torpedo has typically been the most dominant developmental club in Kazakhstan. Most Kazakh players who have reached the NHL trace their roots to Torpedo.

=== Uzbekistan ===
It was reported that Binokor Tashkent which played in Uzbekistan Hockey League could appear in the Kontinental Hockey League in either 2018/19 or 2019/20 after the proposed opening of Humo Arena.

In March 2019, Binokor Tashkent reportedly had a pathway of entering KHL via competing in second-tier league VHL by 2020 at the earliest. The possible time for getting into KHL will be 2022 with training adequate players and sufficient preparations. Newly opened Humo Arena will host home matches for Binokor. On 31 May 2019 it was announced that Humo Tashkent would be joining the VHL for the 2019–20 season and not Binokor Tashkent as originally assumed.

== East Asia ==
Former ice hockey player and member of the council of the Ice hockey Federation Viacheslav Fetisov, has expressed hopes of expanding the KHL into several countries in East Asia, including China, Japan, South Korea and even North Korea; and the development of a Far East division in KHL was discussed in a meeting with the board in July, 2014.

== Persian Gulf Nations ==
In August 2018, vice-president of KHL commented on the possibility of expanding the league in UAE. There was no official discussion with UAE Ice Sports Federation.

In February 2019, president of the Emirates Ice Hockey League (EHL) Vladimir Burdun announced the goal of entering an UAE team in KHL by 2021. He also aimed at strengthening UAE ice hockey team by 2020, in order to get players ready for NHL. A new ice arena is expected to open in Abu Dhabi in 2019 which meets all the requirements of the KHL. The plan was to replicate the success of another ice hockey team situated in deserts, Vegas Golden Knights. NHL and KHL stars such as Pavel Datsyuk, Sergei Mozyakin, Alexander Ovechkin were mentioned to improve competitiveness.

== Teams currently involved ==
Team	City/Area	League	Status
(China) ORG Star Ice Hockey Club	Beijing	Expansion	Expressed hopes to join in the future.
(Uzbekistan) Binokor Tashkent	Tashkent	Uzbekistan Hockey League	Could join in either 2018–19 or 2019–20. Terms of the club's admission into the league directly depend on the date of putting their new arena (Humo Arena) into operation.
(Russia) Rubin Tyumen	Tyumen	Supreme Hockey League	Requires new arena.

== See also ==
- Kontinental Hockey League team changes
