= Nikita Mokin =

Kazakhstani-Russian ice hockey player

- Born: March 14, 1992 (age 33) Oskemen, Kazakhstan
- Height: 6 ft 2 in (188 cm)
- Weight: 181 lb (82 kg; 12 st 13 lb)
- Position: Defence
- Shot: Left
- Played for: ShKO Oskemen; Syracuse Jr. Stars; Avangard Omsk; Yermak Angarsk; Arlan Kokshetau
- National team: Kazakhstan
- NHL draft: Undrafted
- Playing career: 2009–2016

Nikita Vladimirovich Mokin (Russian: Никита Владимирович Мокин; born March 14, 1992) is a Kazakhstani-Russian professional ice hockey defenceman who is currently playing with Avangard Omsk in the Kontinental Hockey League (KHL). Mokin selected 148th overall in the seventh round of 2010 KHL Junior Draft by Avangard Omsk.

== Career statistics ==
			Regular season					Playoffs
Season	Team	League	GP	G	A	Pts	PIM	GP	G	A	Pts	PIM
2008–09	Torpedo Ust-Kamenogorsk-2	Russia3	1	0	0	0	2	—	—	—	—	—
2009–10	Syracuse Jr. Stars	EmJHL	29	8	10	18	59	4	0	2	2	8
2009–10	Torpedo Ust-Kamenogorsk-2	Kazakhstan	4	0	0	0	2	—	—	—	—	—
2010–11	Omskie Yastreby	MHL	52	4	9	13	87	4	1	1	2	8
2011–12	Omskie Yastreby	MHL	59	5	4	9	102	15	1	2	3	14
2012–13	Omskie Yastreby	MHL	60	7	14	21	48	18	1	5	6	8
2013–14	Avangard Omsk	KHL	1	0	0	0	0	—	—	—	—	—
2013–14	Yermak Angarsk	VHL	16	0	0	0	0	—	—	—	—	—
2014–15	Arlan Kokshetau	Kazakhstan	39	3	5	8	10	13	0	1	1	6
2015–16	Arlan Kokshetau	Kazakhstan	4	0	0	0	0	—	—	—	—	—
2015–16	ShKO Ust-Kamenogorsk	Kazakhstan	34	0	4	4	8	—	—	—	—	—
KHL totals			1	0	0	0	0	—	—	—	—	—
Kazakhstan totals			81	3	9	12	20	13	0	1	1	6
