= Valery Knyazev =

Russian ice hockey player

- Born: June 11, 1992 (age 33) Prague, Czechoslovakia
- Height: 5 ft 11 in (180 cm)
- Weight: 187 lb (85 kg; 13 st 5 lb)
- Position: Right wing
- Shoots: Left
- KHL team: Sibir Novosibirsk
- NHL draft: Undrafted
- Playing career: 2011–present

Valery Knyazev (born June 11, 1992) is a Russian ice hockey player. He currently plays with HC Sibir Novosibirsk of the Kontinental Hockey League (KHL).

Knyazev was selected by Sibir Novosibirsk in the first round (15th overall) of the 2011 KHL Junior Draft, and he made his KHL debut with HC Sibir during the 2011–12 KHL season.
