= Tomáš Pék =

Slovak ice hockey player

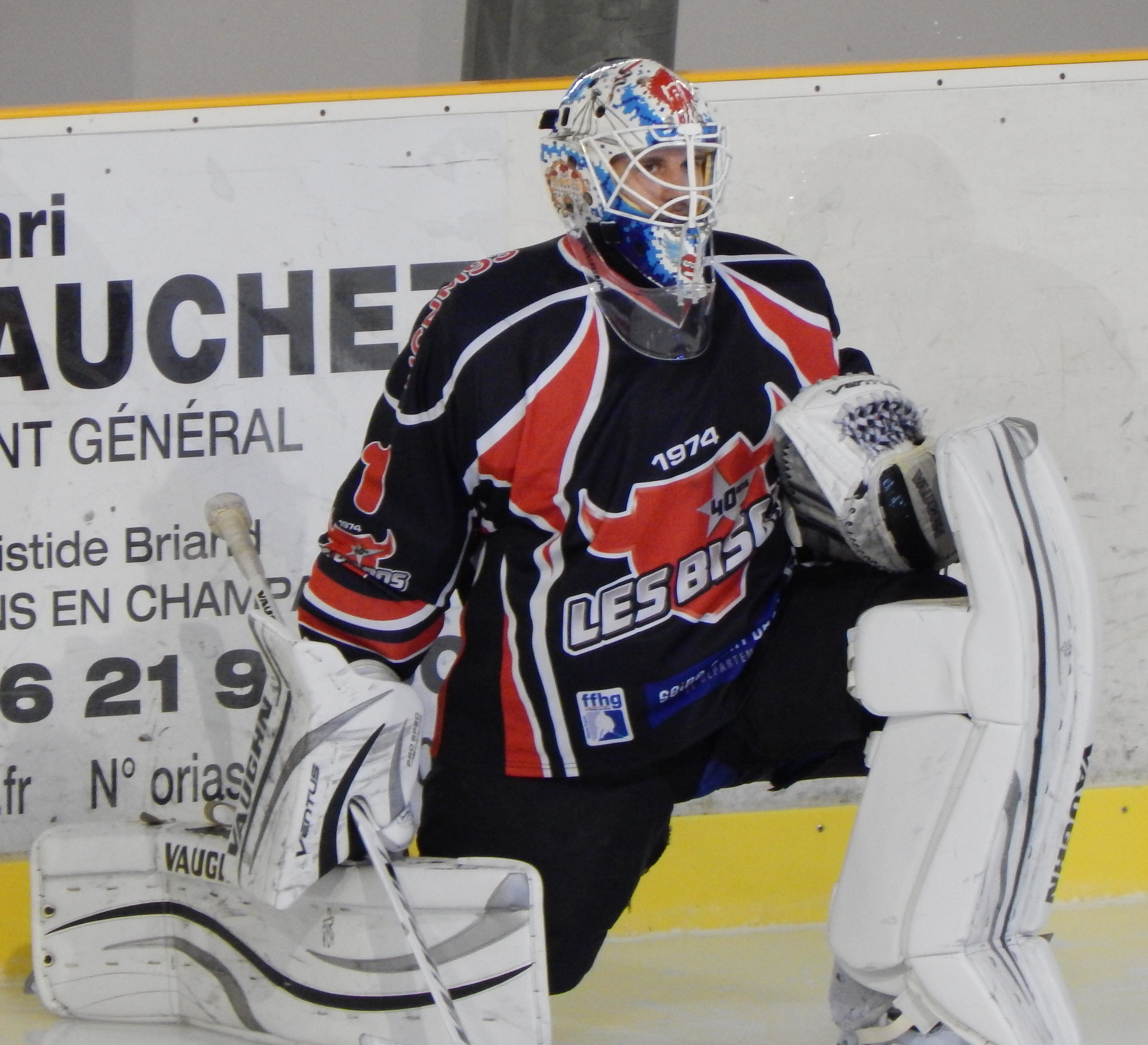
- Born: May 30, 1991 (age 33); Bratislava, Czechoslovakia
- Height: 6 ft 2 in (188 cm)
- Weight: 168 lb (76 kg; 12 st 0 lb)
- Position: Goaltender
- Catches: Right
- Slovak Extraliga team: HC Slovan Bratislava
- Playing career: 2010–present

Tomáš Pék (born May 30, 1991) is a Slovak professional ice hockey goaltender who played with HC Slovan Bratislava in the Slovak Extraliga during the 2010–11 season. He was selected by SKA St. Petersburg in the first round (10th overall) of the 2010 KHL Junior Draft.
