= Jack Campbell (ice hockey) =

American ice hockey player (born 1992)

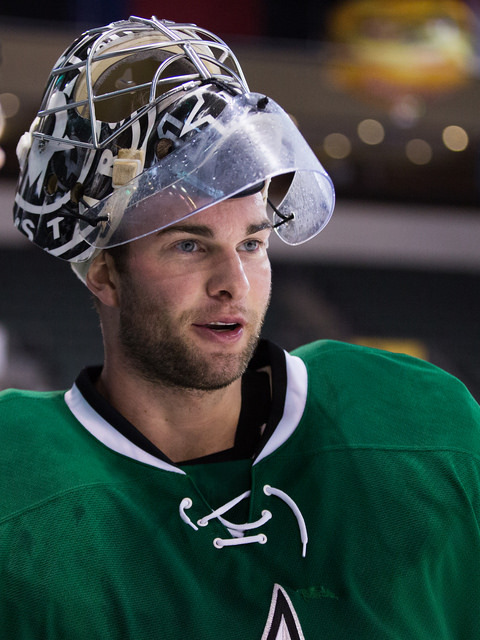
- Campbell with the Texas Stars in 2016
- Born: January 9, 1992 (age 34) Port Huron, Michigan, U.S.
- Height: 6 ft 3 in (191 cm)
- Weight: 200 lb (91 kg; 14 st 4 lb)
- Position: Goaltender
- Caught: Left
- Played for: Dallas Stars; Los Angeles Kings; Toronto Maple Leafs; Edmonton Oilers
- National team: United States
- NHL draft: 11th overall, 2010; Dallas Stars
- Playing career: 2012–2025

Jack Campbell (born January 9, 1992) is a retired American professional ice hockey goaltender. Prior to his professional career, Campbell played for the Windsor Spitfires and Sault Ste. Marie Greyhounds of the Ontario Hockey League. Nicknamed "Soup/Soupy", in reference to Campbell's, he was selected in the first round (11th overall) by the Dallas Stars in the 2010 NHL entry draft and made his NHL debut in 2013. After spending several years in the minors, Campbell was traded to the Los Angeles Kings, serving as the team's backup before joining the Toronto Maple Leafs in 2020, where he emerged as an effective starting netminder and was named to the NHL All-Star Game in 2022. He left Toronto after the 2021–22 season to sign with the Edmonton Oilers. Performing poorly with the Oilers, he was waived by the team in November 2023, and assigned to their American Hockey League (AHL) affiliate, the Bakersfield Condors, before being bought out at the end of the season.

Internationally, Campbell has represented the United States at both a junior and senior levels. During the 2010 World Junior Championships, Campbell backstopped the United States junior team to its second gold medal in program history.

== Early life ==
Campbell was born on January 9, 1992, in Port Huron, Michigan, to parents Jack Sr. and Debbie. Campbell was inspired by his older cousin Marshall to become a goaltender. Although his father, uncle, and coaches tried to convince Campbell to play other positions, he continued as a goaltender.

== Playing career ==
=== Amateur ===
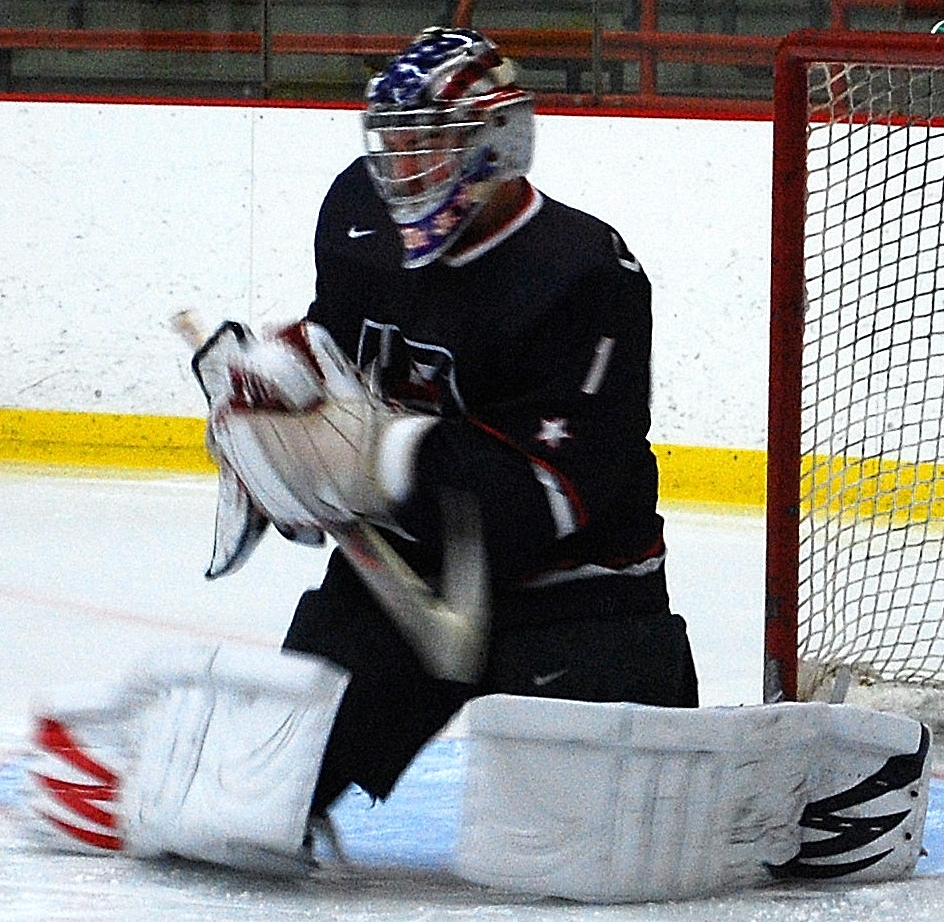
Campbell with the U.S. national under-18 team

As a youth, Campbell played in the 2005 Quebec International Pee-Wee Hockey Tournament with the Detroit Little Caesars minor ice hockey team. Little Caesars lost the first game of the tournament 2–0 to Burnaby, placing them in the losers' bracket. From there, they went on to win the tournament, defeating Detroit Compuware in the finals.

He eventually graduated to the Detroit Honeybaked midget team. From there, Campbell was drafted 108th overall in the 2008 Ontario Hockey League Priority Selection. Despite his selection, Campbell joined the USA Hockey National Team Development Program (NTDP) in 2008. In his second season within the North American Hockey League (NAHL), Campbell received the Dave Peterson Goaltender of the Year Award.

On November 24, 2009, Campbell withdrew his verbal intent to play college ice hockey for the University of Michigan in order to qualify to play in the OHL. By the conclusion of his two seasons with the NTDP, Campbell had set a new franchise record for lowest goals against average and most shutouts in a career. He also earned a gold medal for the United States under-18 team at the 2009 and 2010 World U18 Championships. As a result, Campbell was drafted 11th overall by the Dallas Stars in the 2010 NHL entry draft. Campbell was also chosen in the seventh round (170th overall) by Dinamo Minsk in the 2010 KHL Junior Draft.

=== OHL ===
On July 28, 2010, Campbell left the NTDP and joined the Windsor Spitfires who had drafted him in 2008. He struggled in his first season, putting up poor numbers and was eventually traded to the Sault Ste. Marie Greyhounds for MacKenzie Braid, Patrick Sieloff, a 2012 third-round pick, a 2013 second- and third-round picks, two 2014 second-round picks, a 2015 second-round pick and a conditional 2016 15th-round pick.

=== Professional ===
==== Dallas Stars ====
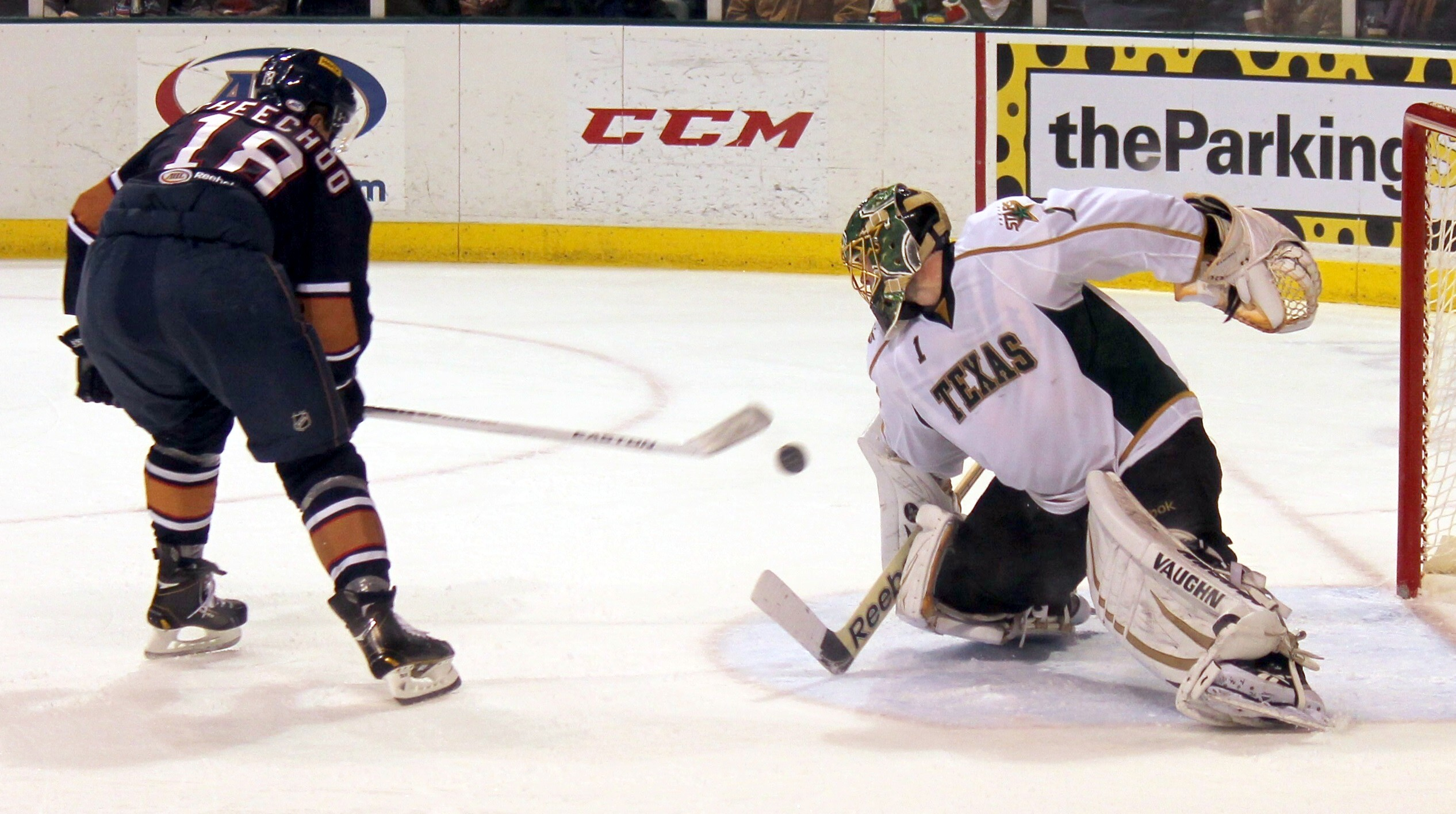
Campbell makes a save against Jonathan Cheechoo, while playing with the Texas Stars in February 2013.

Following the conclusion of the 2011–12 season with the Greyhounds, the Stars assigned Campbell to their American Hockey League (AHL) affiliate, the Texas Stars. On March 23, he made his professional debut against the Oklahoma City Barons in a loss. Two nights later, on March 25, he won his first professional game against the Toronto Marlies. He made 32 saves on the way to a 4–2 win. On March 30, he had his first professional shutout over the Lake Erie Monsters by making 30 saves in the 4–0 win.

After attending the Stars' training camp, Campbell was assigned to the American Hockey League to begin the 2013–14 season. On October 20, 2013, Campbell was recalled from Texas and made his NHL debut with Dallas, posting a 6–3 loss against the Anaheim Ducks. He was returned to the American Hockey League where he helped lead the Stars to the 2014 Calder Cup.

Despite his championship season, Campbell was assigned to the American Hockey League to begin the 2014–15 season after attending the Stars' training camp. Prior to the 2015–16 season, Campbell injured his hand which delayed his season debut. Upon his return to the lineup, Campbell went 1–3–0 in each of his starts. However, on December 28, 2015, Campbell was reassigned to the Texas Stars' East Coast Hockey League (ECHL) affiliate, Idaho Steelheads for an undetermined amount of time. Campbell describes this time as difficult for his mental health and he felt unmotivated to play hockey. He said he would "view myself in the mirror as like if I'm a good or bad person based on if I won or lost." However, upon his return to the American Hockey League, Campbell recorded 11 wins out of 14 starts.

==== Los Angeles Kings ====
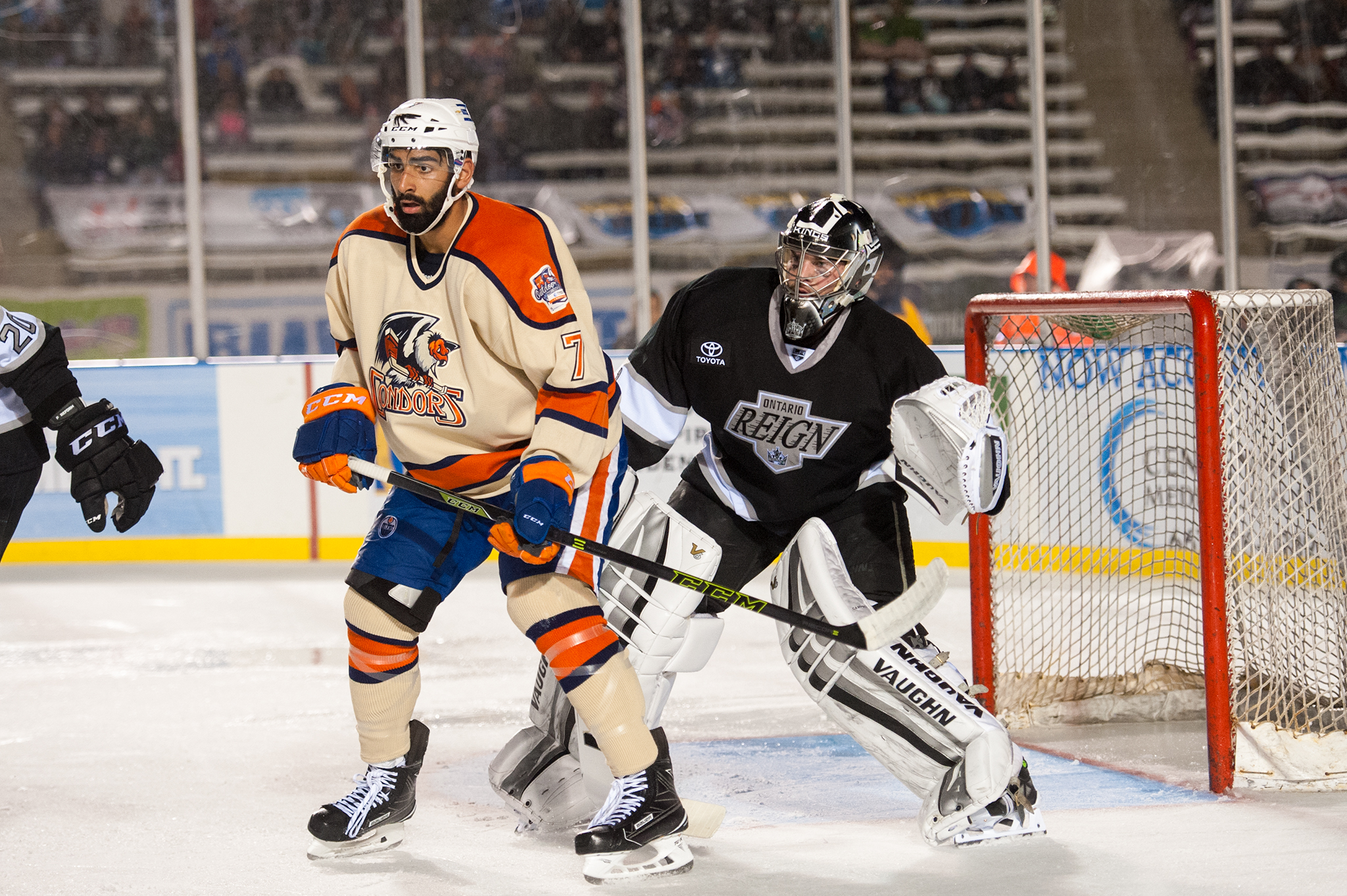
Campbell in net for the Ontario Reign during the 2017 AHL Outdoor Classic

Unable to progress within the Stars organization, on June 25, 2016, Campbell was traded to the Los Angeles Kings for defenseman Nick Ebert. On July 11, 2016, Campbell signed as a restricted free agent to a two-year, two-way contract with the Kings. On November 22, 2017, he signed a two-year contract extension with the Kings. On February 27, 2018, Campbell made 41 saves and earned his first NHL win in a 4–1 victory over the Vegas Golden Knights. On October 11, 2018, Campbell recorded his first NHL shutout with 40 saves against the Montreal Canadiens. He developed a friendship with fellow goaltender Jonathan Quick and accompanied him to the 2018 NHL Awards as his "backup", carrying a towel and water bottle with him.

His success was short lived, however, as he suffered a knee injury on November 10. At the time of his injury, Campbell had played in 13 games with a 5–7–0 record. On December 19, the Kings assigned Campbell to the Ontario Reign on a conditioning assignment. He was recalled from the Reign on December 31, 2018, and started the Kings following game on January 1, 2019, against the Vegas Golden Knights.

On September 7, 2019, the Kings re-signed Campbell to a two-year, $3.3 million contract extension.

==== Toronto Maple Leafs ====
On February 5, 2020, the Kings traded Campbell (alongside Kyle Clifford) to the Toronto Maple Leafs for Trevor Moore, a 2020 third-round pick, and a conditional 2021 third-round pick. He made his Maple Leafs debut on February 7, resulting in a 5–4 overtime win against the Anaheim Ducks.

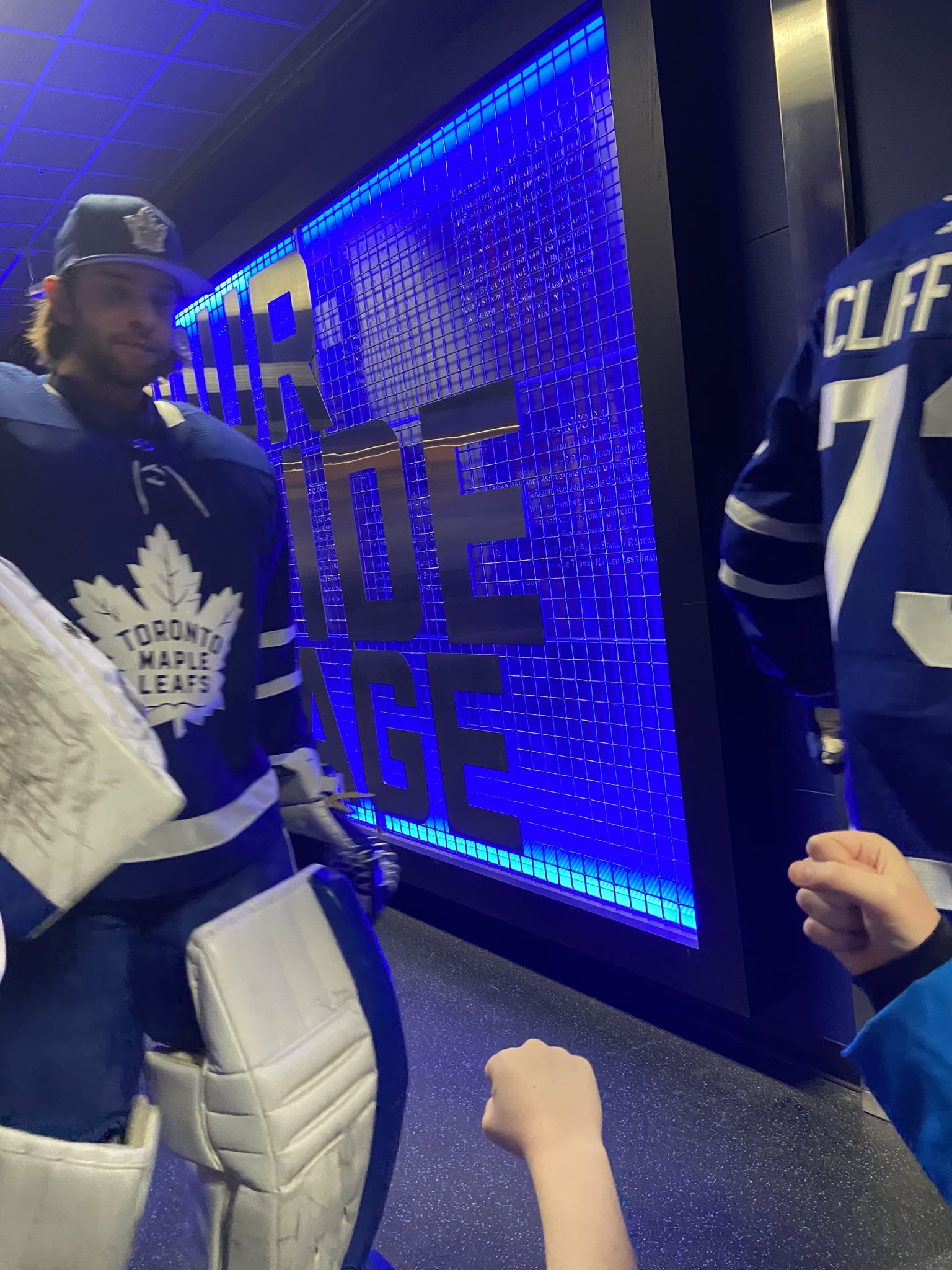
Campbell with the Toronto Maple Leafs in February 2020

Initially acquired to strengthen team goaltending depth and serve as a backup to starting netminder Frederik Andersen, Campbell quickly emerged as a skilled goaltender in Toronto and became the team's starter the following season, overtaking Andersen's role through strong play. Following his arrival in Toronto, Campbell experienced much success and became a fan favourite, setting several records and joining the league leaders in goaltending statistics. On April 7, 2021, Campbell set a Maple Leafs record for consecutive wins by a goaltender, with 10. The previous franchise record of 9 was shared by Felix Potvin, Jacques Plante and John Ross Roach. He additionally tied the league record with Montreal Canadiens' goaltender Carey Price for consecutive wins to start a season, and later setting a new and final record of 11 in the following game on April 10, 2021, when the Leafs beat the Ottawa Senators 6–5. Campbell remained the team's starter for the rest of the season, helping them qualify for the playoffs, where he made his postseason debut. Despite strong play from the netminder, the team lost in the opening round in seven games to the Montreal Canadiens.

Campbell continued his strong play the following season, remaining the team's starter and elevating himself to be among the leaders in several goaltending categories. On November 2, 2021, he achieved the fifth shutout of his career against the Golden Knights. Campbell's success in Toronto was rewarded when, on January 13, 2022, he was selected for the 2022 NHL All-Star Game, his first NHL all star game, along with teammate Auston Matthews. At the time of his selection to the game, Campbell had a record of 18–5–3 with a .935 save percentage (second in the league for goaltenders) and a 2.02 goals-against average. Following the All-Star break, Campbell's play pronouncedly declined, coinciding with ongoing struggles of his tandem partner Petr Mrazek that put the Maple Leafs' goaltending into question. A February 26 game against the Detroit Red Wings was widely identified as the nadir, with Campbell giving up four goals in six minutes in the third period and being pulled, while Mrazek and both Red Wings goaltenders also struggled, leading to a 10–7 Leafs victory. In March, it was announced that Campbell was dealing with a rib injury and would miss several weeks. In his absence, Mrazek was also injured, greatly expanding the role of Marlies goaltender Erik Källgren. Campbell returned to the crease for the remainder of the season, and saw his play improve. He finished the regular season with a 31–9–6 record and a .914 save percentage. The Leafs entered the 2022 Stanley Cup playoffs for a round one matchup with the Tampa Bay Lightning. Campbell was considered a key factor opposite Vezina- and Conn Smythe Trophy-winning Lightning goaltender Andrei Vasilevskiy. In a closely fought series, the Leafs were eventually eliminated in seven games.

With the conclusion of Campbell's contract, he was seen as one of the strongest free agent goaltenders available, and it was perceived as unlikely that the Maple Leafs would re-sign him at his desired price and term. Days prior to the opening of free agency it was announced that the Leafs had traded for Ottawa Senators goaltender Matt Murray, which was widely taken as confirmation that Campbell would not be returning.

==== Edmonton Oilers ====
On July 13, 2022, Campbell signed as a free agent to a five-year, $25 million contract with the Edmonton Oilers.

Campbell's first year with the Oilers was disappointing, and his poor play led rookie netminder Stuart Skinner to quickly beat Campbell to earn the Oilers starting job over him. Although he ultimately posted a winning record, Campbell finished the season with a .888 save percentage amid widespread criticism of his play. Campbell's poor play continued into the 2023–24 season and on November 7, 2023, Campbell was waived by the Oilers for the purpose of assigning him to the American Hockey League. Unclaimed by any team on waivers, Campbell was assigned to the Bakersfield Condors; he made his debut with the team on November 9, 2023, allowing 4 goals on 20 shots. On June 30, 2024, the Oilers exercised an ordinary-course buyout of the remainder of Campbell's contract, paying him a discounted $9 million, spread over a six-year period, and making Campbell a free agent.

==== Detroit Red Wings and Grand Rapids Griffins ====
On July 1, 2024, Campbell signed a one-year, $775,000 contract with the Detroit Red Wings. On October 4, it was announced that Campbell had entered the NHL/NHLPA Assistance Program and would be unavailable for the team for an indefinite period while he received care from the Player Assistance Program. He returned to Detroit later that fall where he was assigned to the club's AHL affiliate, the Grand Rapids Griffins. Campbell only dressed for the Red Wings once, called up on Dec. 14 on an emergency basis to back up Ville Husso, although he did not play and was subsequently reassigned to the Griffins.

Campbell played 14 regular season games for the Griffins, with a 0.824 save percentage and 2.91 goals allowed average; in the post-season, he appeared twice, including once in relief. In his first, relief appearance, he allowed no goals on 11 shots, but ultimately could not contribute to a win to make up for the four goals allowed by starter Stephane Julien. The following game saw Campbell get the start, where he allowed four goals on 27 shots. The Griffins lost the series, swept by Campbell's former club, the Texas Stars.

In a February 2026 podcast appearance, Campbell was referred to as a "retired" NHL goaltender and a "former" professional hockey player, and referenced beginning to work as a life coach.

== International play ==
Campbell represented the United States numerous times over the course of his career, but his most memorable youth international competition was the 2010 World Junior Championships where he backstopped the United States junior team to an upset victory over the host Canada in the gold medal game. For his efforts, he was named tournament's best goaltender. Following this tournament, he was again invited to the United States camp prior to the 2012 World Junior Championships

Campbell finally made the United States senior team debut during the 2015 World Championship, where the United States won bronze medals.

== Personal life ==
On June 24, 2022, Campbell got engaged to his girlfriend Ashley Sonnenberg. The couple have adopted three dogs together; on December 23, 2025, their then-newest puppy died unexpectedly. Campbell stated on a podcast interview that this affected him tremendously, as he has been very close with his dogs and pets throughout his life.

Campbell has referenced doing work in therapy, yoga and meditation to help with both his performance and mental health, and made reference on the Shane Vitko podcast to wanting to end his life at various times. He said at the end of the podcast that he was getting into work as a life coach.

== Career statistics ==
=== Regular season and playoffs ===
			Regular season									Playoffs
Season	Team	League	GP	W	L	T/OT	MIN	GA	SO	GAA	SV%	GP	W	L	MIN	GA	SO	GAA	SV%
2008–09	U.S. national under-18 team	Ind	7	7	0	0	421	12	2	1.71	.940	—	—	—	—	—	—	—	—
2008–09	U.S. national under-18 team	NAHL	21	14	6	1	1,262	53	1	2.52	.906	—	—	—	—	—	—	—	—
2009–10	U.S. National Development Team	USHL	11	6	3	1	569	21	0	2.21	.917	—	—	—	—	—	—	—	—
2010–11	Windsor Spitfires	OHL	45	24	14	4	2,447	155	0	3.80	.884	18	9	9	1,124	70	2	3.74	.887
2011–12	Windsor Spitfires	OHL	12	6	3	2	729	38	1	3.13	.906	—	—	—	—	—	—	—	—
2011–12	Sault Ste. Marie Greyhounds	OHL	34	15	12	5	1,945	116	1	3.58	.892	—	—	—	—	—	—	—	—
2011–12	Texas Stars	AHL	12	4	7	0	677	34	1	3.02	.912	—	—	—	—	—	—	—	—
2012–13	Texas Stars	AHL	40	19	13	3	2,108	93	2	2.65	.905	—	—	—	—	—	—	—	—
2013–14	Texas Stars	AHL	16	12	2	2	966	24	4	1.49	.942	4	2	1	237	10	0	2.54	.917
2013–14	Dallas Stars	NHL	1	0	1	0	60	6	0	6.00	.872	—	—	—	—	—	—	—	—
2014–15	Texas Stars	AHL	35	14	14	5	1,958	99	2	3.03	.907	1	0	1	59	3	0	3.03	.889
2014–15	Idaho Steelheads	ECHL	7	5	2	0	417	12	1	1.73	.945	—	—	—	—	—	—	—	—
2015–16	Texas Stars	AHL	19	7	7	6	1,035	63	0	3.65	.884	3	1	2	148	11	0	4.45	.880
2015–16	Idaho Steelheads	ECHL	20	14	5	1	1,211	34	4	1.68	.944	—	—	—	—	—	—	—	—
2016–17	Ontario Reign	AHL	52	31	15	6	3,072	129	5	2.52	.914	5	2	2	282	8	0	1.70	.934
2016–17	Los Angeles Kings	NHL	1	0	0	0	20	0	0	0.00	1.000	—	—	—	—	—	—	—	—
2017–18	Ontario Reign	AHL	26	11	10	4	1,482	70	0	2.83	.912	—	—	—	—	—	—	—	—
2017–18	Los Angeles Kings	NHL	5	2	0	2	267	11	0	2.47	.924	—	—	—	—	—	—	—	—
2018–19	Los Angeles Kings	NHL	31	10	14	1	1,593	61	2	2.30	.928	—	—	—	—	—	—	—	—
2018–19	Ontario Reign	AHL	2	1	1	0	123	9	0	4.38	.888	—	—	—	—	—	—	—	—
2019–20	Los Angeles Kings	NHL	20	8	10	2	1,202	57	0	2.85	.900	—	—	—	—	—	—	—	—
2019–20	Toronto Maple Leafs	NHL	6	3	2	1	365	16	0	2.63	.915	—	—	—	—	—	—	—	—
2020–21	Toronto Maple Leafs	NHL	22	17	3	2	1,284	46	2	2.15	.921	7	3	4	431	13	1	1.81	.934
2021–22	Toronto Maple Leafs	NHL	49	31	9	6	2,796	123	5	2.64	.914	7	3	4	401	21	1	3.15	.897
2022–23	Edmonton Oilers	NHL	36	21	9	4	2,027	115	1	3.41	.888	4	1	0	119	2	0	1.01	.961
2023–24	Edmonton Oilers	NHL	5	1	4	0	267	20	0	4.50	.873	—	—	—	—	—	—	—	—
2023–24	Bakersfield Condors	AHL	33	18	13	1	1,914	84	3	2.63	.918	1	0	1	58	5	0	5.16	.857
2024–25	Grand Rapids Griffins	AHL	14	5	7	1	824	40	0	2.91	.893	2	0	1	89	4	0	2.69	.905
NHL totals			176	93	52	18	9,879	455	10	2.76	.909	18	7	8	950	36	2	2.28	.920

=== International ===
Medal record

Men's ice hockey

Representing the United States

World Championships
Bronze medal – third place	2015 Czech Republic	

World Junior Championships
Gold medal – first place	2010 Canada	
Bronze medal – third place	2011 United States	

IIHF World U18 Championships
Gold medal – first place	2010 Belarus	
Gold medal – first place	2009 United States	

Year	Team	Event	Result	GP	W	L	OTL	MIN	GA	SO	GAA	SV%
2009	United States	U18	1st place, gold medalist(s)	5	3	1	0	241	3	2	0.75	.967
2010	United States	U18	1st place, gold medalist(s)	6	5	1	0	360	5	3	0.83	.965
2010	United States	WJC	1st place, gold medalist(s)	3	2	1	0	166	7	1	2.54	.923
2011	United States	WJC	3rd place, bronze medalist(s)	6	5	1	0	354	10	0	1.70	.941
2011	United States (Note: Campbell dressed as the back-up goaltender for one game, but did not play.)	WC	8th	—	—	—	—	—	—	—	—	—
2012	United States	WJC	7th	5	3	2	0	297	13	0	2.62	.907
2015	United States	WC	3rd place, bronze medalist(s)	2	1	1	0	120	7	0	3.50	.825
Junior totals				25	18	6	0	1,418	38	6	1.61	—
Senior totals				2	1	1	0	120	7	0	3.50	.825

== Awards and honors ==
Award	Year	Ref
AHL
Calder Cup champion	2014	
NHL
All-Star Game	2022	
International
U18 All-Star Team	2009	
U18 All-Star Team	2010	
U18 Best Goaltender	2010	
WJC All-Star Team	2011	
WJC Best Goaltender	2011	

== Notes ==
Awards and achievements
Preceded by Scott Glennie	Dallas Stars first-round draft pick 2010	Succeeded by Jamie Oleksiak
