= KHL territorial pick =

A KHL territorial pick was a special type of draft pick used in the KHL Junior Draft. A Kontinental Hockey League team could protect up to 3 players from its Minor Hockey League affiliate or its hockey school(s) and use its first-round pick to draft one of its protected players.

However, unlike the NBA territorial picks, where NBA teams used territorial draft picks sparsely, KHL teams frequently used such picks to keep local talent. Also, in the KHL, the territorial draft picks were factored into the overall selection count. As such, a KHL team could draft more than one territorial pick; it happened in 2010 when Lokomotiv Yaroslavl, as well as Traktor Chelyabinsk used their two first-round draft picks on territorial picks.

For 2012, the rules changed: now a team could protect up to 5 players and use any pick, regardless of round, to select them, unless entering the disaster draft, in which case a team can protect as many players as they want for the five years following the disaster draft. The KHL Junior Draft was discontinued in 2016.

== Key ==
Pos.	G	F	D
Position	Goaltender	Forward	Defenseman

== List of territorial draft picks ==
Draft	Player	Pos.	Pick	Nationality	KHL team	Team from (city)
2010	Maxim Alyapkin^	G	4	Russia	Vityaz Chekhov	Russkie Vityazi (Podolsk)
2010	Alexei Shubin^	F	6	Russia	Lokomotiv Yaroslavl	Loko (Yaroslavl)
2010	Alexei Shamin^	F	7	Russia	Lokomotiv Yaroslavl	Loko (Yaroslavl)
2010	Maxim Shalunov^	F	15	Russia	Traktor Chelyabinsk	Belye Medvedi (Chelyabinsk)
2010	Denis Perevozchikov^	F	16	Russia	Ak Bars Kazan	Bars (Kazan)
2010	Andrei Pedan^	D	18	Russia	Dynamo Moscow	Sherif (Tver)
2010	Nail Yakupov^	F	19	Russia	Neftekhimik Nizhnekamsk	Reaktor (Nizhnekamsk)
2010	Nikita Nesterov^	D	22	Russia	Traktor Chelyabinsk	Belye Medvedi (Chelyabinsk)
2011	Igor Ishaev	C	2	Russia	Amur Khabarovsk	Amurskie Tigry (Khabarovsk)
2011	Andrei Vasilevski	G	7	Russia	Salavat Yulaev Ufa	Tolpar (Ufa)
2011	Mikhail Grigorenko	C	8	Russia	HC CSKA Moscow	Krasnaya Armia (Moscow)
