= Patrik Nemeth =

Swedish ice hockey player (born 1992)

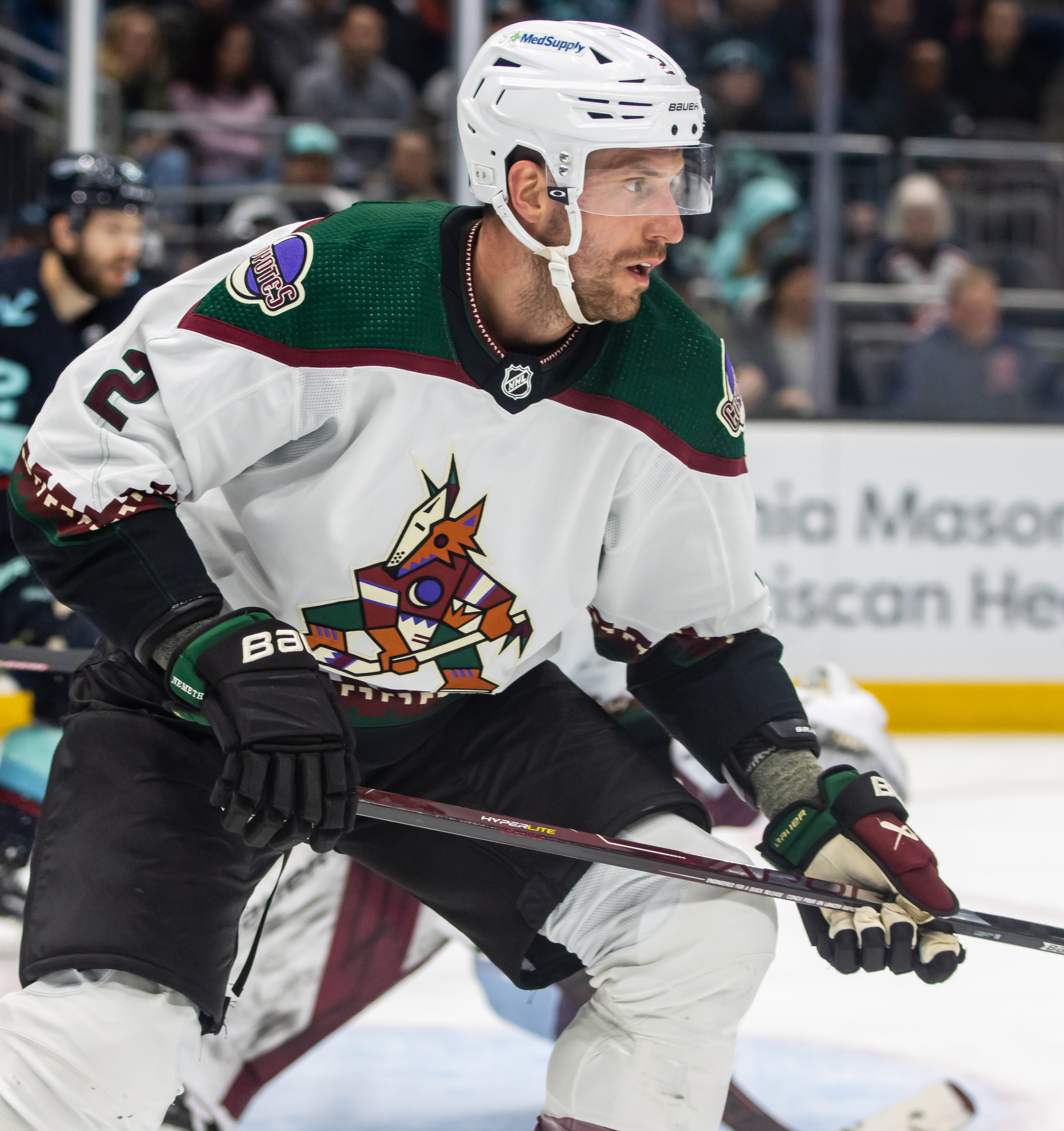
- Nemeth with the Arizona Coyotes in 2023
- Born: February 8, 1992 (age 34) Stockholm, Sweden
- Height: 6 ft 3 in (191 cm)
- Weight: 230 lb (104 kg; 16 st 6 lb)
- Position: Defence
- Shoots: Left
- NL team Former teams: HC Fribourg-Gottéron; AIK; Dallas Stars; Colorado Avalanche; Detroit Red Wings; New York Rangers; Arizona Coyotes; SC Bern
- National team: Sweden
- NHL draft: 41st overall, 2010; Dallas Stars
- Playing career: 2009–present

Patrik Geza Nemeth (born February 8, 1992) is a Swedish professional ice hockey defenceman for HC Fribourg-Gottéron of the National League (NL). Nemeth was selected in the second round, 41st overall, by the Dallas Stars in the 2010 NHL entry draft.

== Playing career ==
=== AIK ===
As a youth, Nemeth originally played within the AIK junior system. As a 15-year old, he spent one junior season with Hammarby IF in the J18 Elit in 2007–08 before returning to the ranks of AIK.

In the 2008–09 season, Nemeth showed promise as a defensive defenseman using his developing size through playing at the J18 levels, winning the J18 Allsveskan Championship. He was promoted to play 19 games with the J20 side, and just after his 17th birthday he was elevated to make his professional debut with AIK in the HockeyAllsvenskan, registering an assist against Leksands IF on February 18, 2009.

Nemeth continued his upward development in the 2009–10 season, playing the majority of the campaign with the J20 team, he formed an effective shutdown pairing with Henrik Nilsson, while also providing 20 points through 38 games. While breaking his way into the Allsvenskan, he registered 3 assists in 16 regular games, before making 3 appearances in the Elitserien Qualifiers, helping the club gain promotion to the top tier.

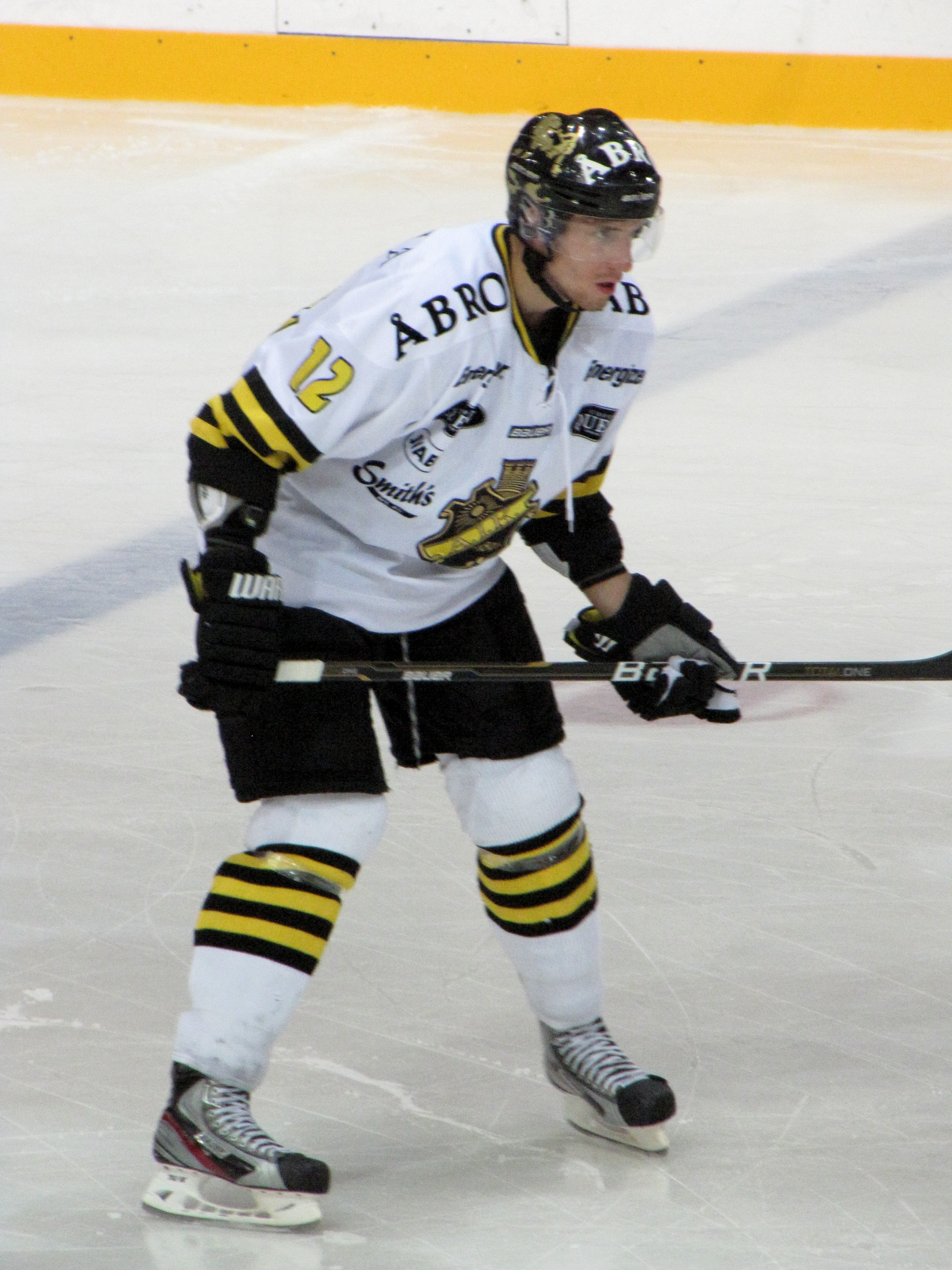
Nemeth during his tenure with AIK IF in 2011.

Impressing at each level through his physical style, Nemeth was the first Swedish and European defenseman to be selected at the 2010 NHL entry draft, selected in the second round, 41st overall, by the Dallas Stars. While also selected at the 2010 KHL Junior Draft by Metallurg Magnitogorsk, Nemeth continued to play in Sweden.

In the 2010–11 season, Nemeth played his first full professional season in the Elitserien with AIK, recording 1 goal and 7 points in 38 regular season contests with AIK. With AIK successfully progressing to the playoffs, he was scoreless in seven games.

On April 21, 2011, Nemeth was signed to a three-year, entry-level contract with the Dallas Stars. While just 19-years old, Nemeth was to be loaned back to AIK by the Stars for the 2011–12 season to continue his growth. In his second full season in the top tier, he was given greater defensive responsibilities, limited offensively with just 3 assists in 46 games.

=== Dallas Stars ===
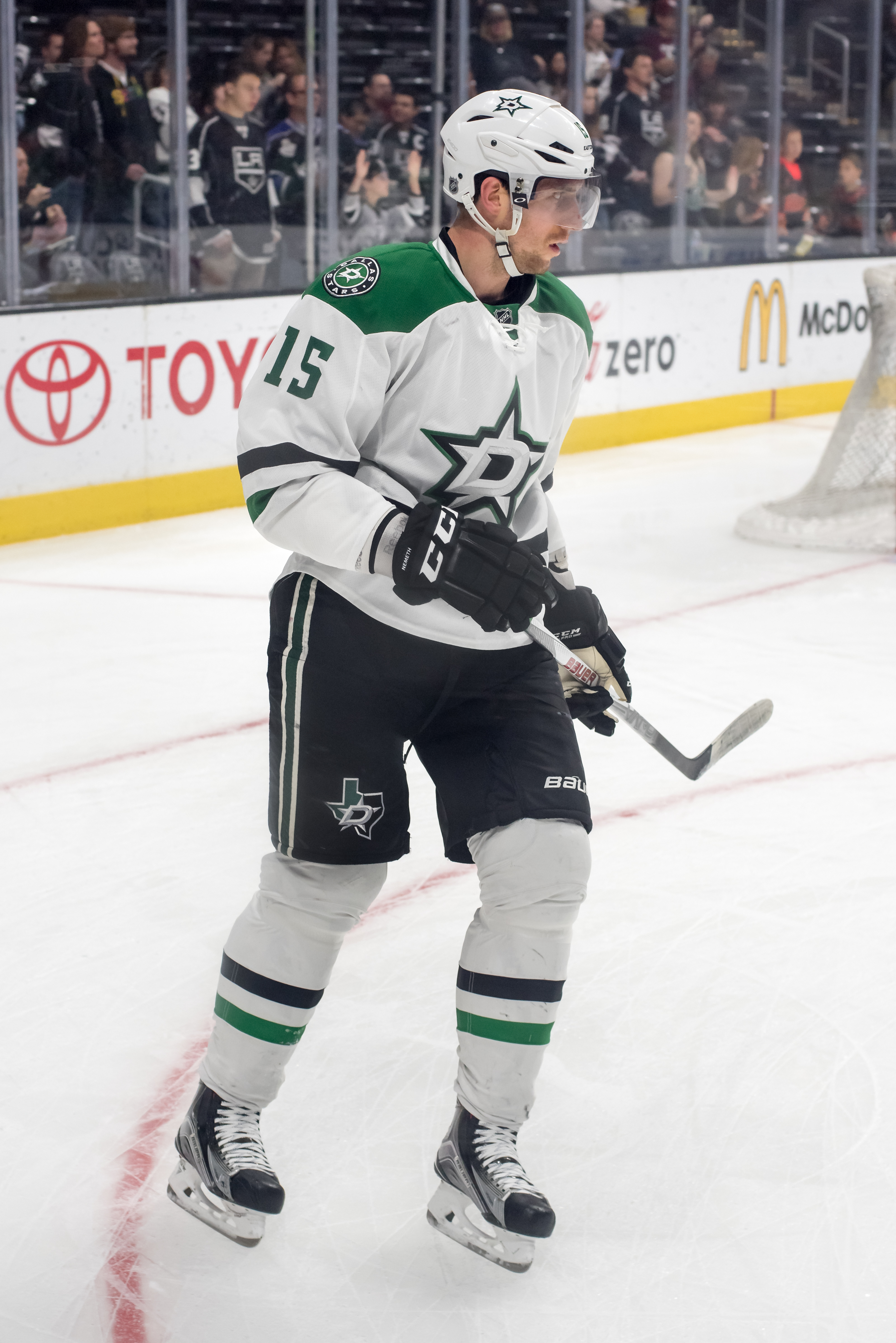
Nemeth with the Dallas Stars in 2016.

After attending the Stars' 2012 training camp, Nemeth was assigned to play the 2012–13 season with AHL affiliate, the Texas Stars. He made his debut on opening night, in a 2-1 victory over the San Antonio Rampage on October 12, 2012. In his first full year in North America, Nemeth posted 1 goal and 11 assists with a + 11 through 47 games.

In the following 2013–14 season, Nemeth returned to continue his tenure with Texas in an increased defensive role. After missing a month due to injury, Nemeth returned to compile 3 goals and 10 points and was leading the team in Plus-minus through 37 games, before he received his first recall by the Dallas Stars on March 31, 2014. Replacing an injured Aaron Rome, he made his NHL debut with the Stars, receiving 11:50 of ice time in a 5-0 victory over the Washington Capitals on April 1, 2014. Nemeth skated in 8 regular season games, helping Dallas clinch a playoff berth. In remaining with the Stars, Nemeth made his playoff debut in game 1 of their first-round encounter against the Anaheim Ducks on April 16, 2014. He appeared in five of Dallas’ six postseason games, before losing the series to the Ducks. He was returned to the Texas Stars following Dallas’ elimination and registering five points in 18 games. On June 17, 2014, during the 2014 Calder Cup playoffs, Nemeth scored the game-winning goal in Game 5 of the Calder Cup Finals to lead the Stars past the St. John's IceCaps and help his team win the Calder Cup for the first time in franchise history.

After a strong showing through the previous season and training camp, Nemeth made the Dallas Stars' opening night roster for the 2014–15 season and played in the first five games of the season before he suffered a serious arm laceration in a defensive play against R.J. Umberger on October 18, 2014, against the Philadelphia Flyers. On October 20, 2014, it was announced that he would miss the remainder of the regular season. Nemeth would recover from his injury earlier then scheduled, missing 52 games before returning to play and find his conditioning with the Texas Stars on February 20, 2015. In his recall to the NHL, Nemeth registered his first point, an assist, in a 4-2 victory over the Washington Capitals on March 13, 2015. Nemeth finished with 3 assists in 22 games before returning to the AHL after the conclusion of Dallas' season. He would register 1 assist in 3 post-season games, unable to help Texas defend the Calder Cup. On June 17, 2015, Nemeth as an impending restricted free agent was promptly signed to a two-year contract extension with Dallas.

For a second consecutive season, Nemeth was on the Star roster to start the 2015–16 season. With the club carrying eight defensemen on the blueline, he featured in just 2 games over a month span before he was assigned to the Texas Stars to maintain his conditioning on November 11, 2015. Returning to the NHL after 8 games, Nemeth was used in a third-pairing role for the second half of season, collecting 8 assists in 38 games.

In the 2016–17 season, Nemeth was unable to cement a role with the Stars early in the campaign, resulting as a healthy scratch through 14 of 16 games. He was again reassigned to the Texas Stars for a conditioning stint on January 6, 2017. Returning from the AHL to Dallas, Nemeth again had a strong second half in a shut down third-pairing role, featuring in his 100th NHL game on March 16, 2017, against the Vancouver Canucks. He appeared in 40 games with Dallas, registering 3 assists.

After he was tendered a qualifying offer in the off-season, Nemeth agreed to a one-year $950,000 extension to remain with the Stars on July 1, 2017.

=== Colorado Avalanche ===
Entering his seventh season within the Stars organization, and failing to attain a roster position out of training camp, Nemeth was placed on waivers to start the 2017–18 season. On October 3, 2017, Nemeth was claimed off waivers by division rivals, the Colorado Avalanche. Inserted into the lineup on opening night he recorded an assist in his Avalanche debut against the New York Rangers on October 5, 2017. Providing physical and smart plays on the blueline, Nemeth posted his first NHL goal, in his 118th game, during a 5-3 victory over the Carolina Hurricanes on November 2, 2017. Nemeth had recorded 6 points in his first 12 games before suffering a lower-body injury, forcing him to miss 12 games. He returned to the lineup on December 7 and was a mainstay in an improved Colorado defense, featuring in the final 56 contests of the season, the longest of his career. Adding an need stay-at-home presence, Nemeth recorded a career high 3 goals and 15 points in 68 games. He led the Avalanche in Plus-mins (+27), ranking fourth among all NHL defenseman. In helping the Avalanche return to the playoffs for the first time in four years, Nemeth recorded one assist in 6 games, leading the Avalanche in ice time (23:42) in a first-round defeat to the Nashville Predators.

As a restricted free agent, Nemeth originally filed for arbitration on July 6, 2018. Nemeth's break out season was later rewarded, avoiding arbitration by agreeing to a one-year, $2.5 million contract extension with the Avalanche on August 2, 2018.

In the 2018–19 season, Nemeth built upon his first season with the Avalanche, providing a dependable stay-at-home presence to appear in a career high 74 games. He appeared in his 200th NHL game on December 7, 2018, against the Florida Panthers, and finished the regular season with 1 goal and 10 points. In helping the Avalanche qualify for the playoffs for a second consecutive year, Nemeth appeared in all 5 games of the first-round series win over the top-seeded Calgary Flames. With the emergence of highly touted defensive prospect Cale Makar, Nemeth was initially scratched to start their Conference Semifinals series against the San Jose Sharks, while he did eventually play the Avalanche lost the series in 7 games.

=== Detroit Red Wings ===
Leaving the Avalanche at the conclusion of his contract as a free agent, Nemeth was signed to a two-year, $6 million contract with the Detroit Red Wings on July 1, 2019.

=== Return to Colorado ===
On 9 April 2021, Nemeth was traded with his salary 50% retained by the Red Wings back to the Avalanche in exchange for a fourth-round pick in the 2022 NHL entry draft.

=== New York Rangers ===
On 28 July 2021, Nemeth signed as a free agent to a three-year, $7.5 million deal with the New York Rangers.

=== Arizona Coyotes ===
On July 13, 2022, Nemeth, a second-round pick in the 2025 NHL Entry Draft and a conditional second-round pick in 2026 were traded to the Arizona Coyotes in exchange for Ty Emberson.

In the following 2022–23 season, his tenth in the NHL, Nemeth was a regular on the Coyotes blueline by featuring in 75 appearances as the team's third-pairing defenceman, contributing with five assists. In completing his lone season with the Coyotes, on 20 June 2023, Nemeth was placed on unconditional waivers by the Coyotes and was bought out from the remaining year of his contract the following day.

=== National League ===
After playing over 500 games in the NHL, Nemeth opted to return to Europe as a free agent, securing a two-year contract with Swiss club, SC Bern of the NL, on 28 July 2023.

Having concluded his two year tenure with Bern, Nemeth as a pending free agent opted to continue his career in Switzerland, agreeing to a two-year contract with HC Fribourg-Gottéron commencing from 2025 on 26 November 2024.

== International play ==
Medal record

Representing Sweden

Ice hockey

World Junior Championships
Gold medal – first place	2012 Calgary	

Nemeth played for Sweden's junior national team at the 2012 World Junior Championships, where Nemeth recorded an assist on Mika Zibanejad's Winning goal in Overtime in the final against Russia, helping Sweden win its first gold medal since 1981 and their second in history.

== Career statistics ==
=== Regular season and playoffs ===
			Regular season					Playoffs
Season	Team	League	GP	G	A	Pts	PIM	GP	G	A	Pts	PIM
2007–08	Hammarby Hockey	J18	13	1	3	4	12	—	—	—	—	—
2008–09	AIK	J18	16	2	6	8	51	—	—	—	—	—
2008–09	AIK	J18 Allsv	11	1	4	5	72	4	1	0	1	29
2008–09	AIK	J20	19	0	0	0	43	—	—	—	—	—
2008–09	AIK	Allsv	1	0	1	1	0	—	—	—	—	—
2009–10	AIK	J18 Allsv	3	0	1	1	4	1	0	1	1	0
2009–10	AIK	J20	38	1	19	20	120	5	1	2	3	10
2009–10	AIK	Allsv	16	0	3	3	8	3	0	0	0	0
2010–11	AIK	SEL	38	1	6	7	18	7	0	0	0	2
2011–12	AIK	SEL	46	0	3	3	55	11	0	1	1	8
2012–13	Texas Stars	AHL	47	1	11	12	40	—	—	—	—	—
2013–14	Texas Stars	AHL	37	3	7	10	32	18	1	4	5	8
2013–14	Dallas Stars	NHL	8	0	0	0	6	5	0	0	0	12
2014–15	Dallas Stars	NHL	22	0	3	3	6	—	—	—	—	—
2014–15	Texas Stars	AHL	8	0	2	2	6	3	0	1	1	4
2015–16	Dallas Stars	NHL	38	0	8	8	14	—	—	—	—	—
2015–16	Texas Stars	AHL	8	0	1	1	2	—	—	—	—	—
2016–17	Dallas Stars	NHL	40	0	3	3	14	—	—	—	—	—
2016–17	Texas Stars	AHL	4	1	2	3	2	—	—	—	—	—
2017–18	Colorado Avalanche	NHL	68	3	12	15	41	6	0	1	1	4
2018–19	Colorado Avalanche	NHL	74	1	9	10	53	7	0	0	0	4
2019–20	Detroit Red Wings	NHL	64	1	8	9	28	—	—	—	—	—
2020–21	Detroit Red Wings	NHL	39	2	6	8	14	—	—	—	—	—
2020–21	Colorado Avalanche	NHL	13	1	1	2	6	10	0	1	1	6
2021–22	New York Rangers	NHL	63	2	5	7	28	5	0	0	0	8
2022–23	Arizona Coyotes	NHL	75	0	5	5	30	—	—	—	—	—
2023–24	SC Bern	NL	41	2	10	12	22	5	2	1	3	8
2024–25	SC Bern	NL	48	2	14	16	50	7	0	0	0	8
2025–26	HC Fribourg-Gottéron	NL	45	4	10	14	16	11	0	1	1	56
SHL totals			84	1	9	10	73	18	0	1	1	10
NHL totals			504	10	60	70	240	33	0	2	2	34
NL totals			134	8	34	42	88	23	2	2	4	72

=== International ===
Year	Team	Event	Result	GP	G	A	Pts	PIM
2010	Sweden	U18	2nd place, silver medalist(s)	6	0	2	2	8
2011	Sweden	WJC	4th	6	0	1	1	2
2012	Sweden	WJC	1st place, gold medalist(s)	6	0	5	5	2
2023	Sweden	WC	6th	8	1	1	2	4
Junior totals				18	0	8	8	12
Senior totals				8	1	1	2	4

== Awards and honours ==
Award	Year
AHL
Calder Cup (Texas Stars)	2014
