= Alexander Timiryov =

Russian ice hockey player

- Born: March 10, 1994 (age 31) Tyumen, Russia
- Height: 5 ft 10 in (178 cm)
- Weight: 203 lb (92 kg; 14 st 7 lb)
- Position: Forward
- Shoots: Left
- VHL team Former teams: HC Yugra; Neftekhimik Nizhnekamsk
- Playing career: 2013–present

Alexander Timiryov (born March 10, 1994) is a Russian professional ice hockey player. He is currently playing with HC Yugra of the Supreme Hockey League (VHL).

On January 5, 2015, Timiryov made his Kontinental Hockey League debut playing with HC Neftekhimik Nizhnekamsk during the 2014–15 KHL season.

On June 14, 2021, the Metallurg hockey club from the Belarusian Zhlobin announced the signing of a contract with Timirev
