= Denis Gusev =

Russian bodybuilder

- Professional bodybuilder
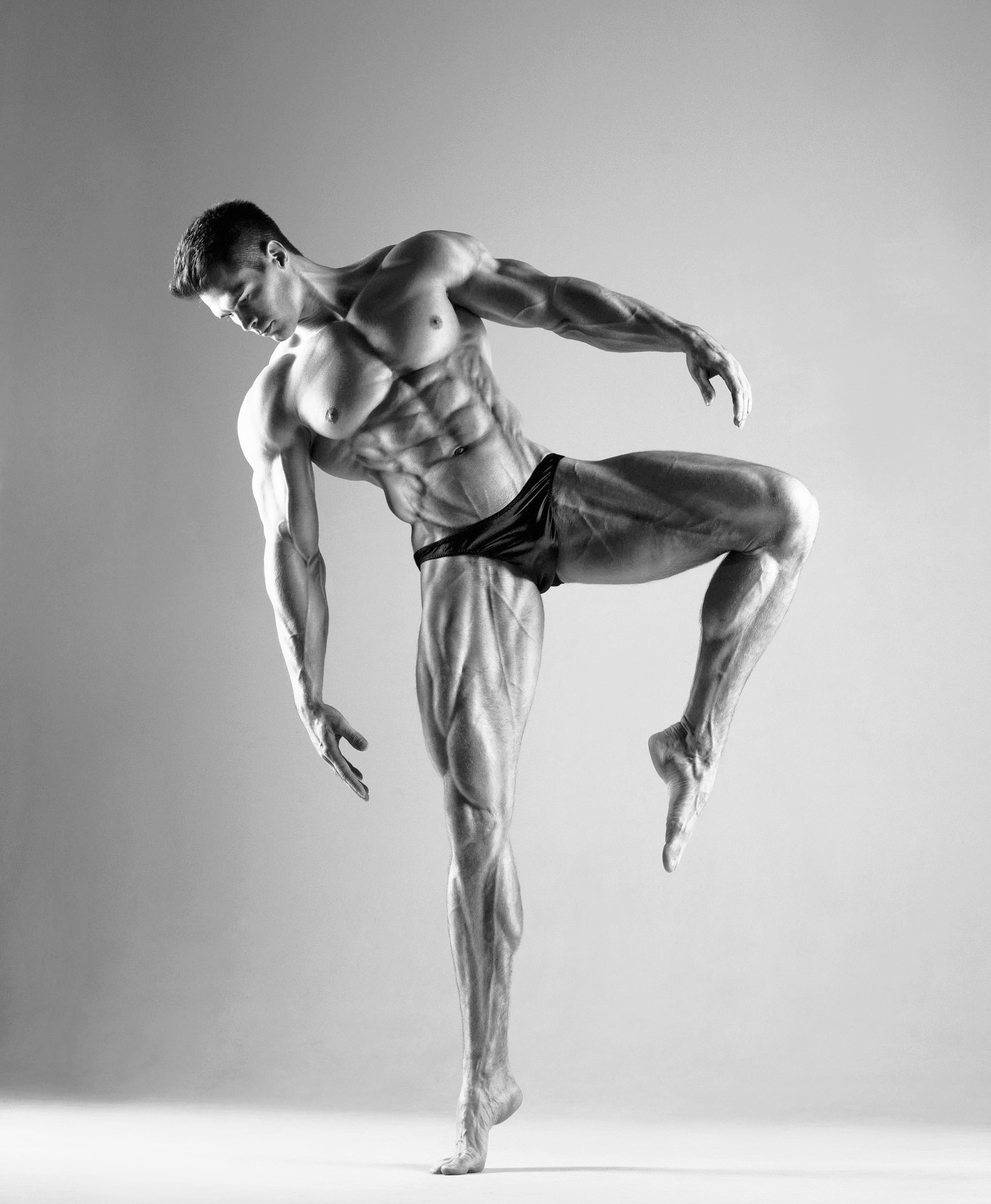
- Denis Gusev, 2016

Personal info
- Born: August 11, 1981 (age 45); Tikhoretsk, Krasnodar Krai, Russian SFSR, Soviet Union

Best statistics
- Height: 186 cm (6 ft 1 in)

Professional (Pro) career
- Pro-debut: Grand Prix Pro, Los Angeles; 2014
- Best win: Arnold Classic Europe; 2013

Denís Aleksándrovich Gúsev (Russian: Дени́с Алекса́ндрович Гу́сев; born August 11, 1981) is a Russian professional bodybuilder.

He is the first Russian to:

- Win 3 professional tournaments in IFBB Pro League in the Men's Physique Pro category in Russia
- Win a gold medal at the amateur Arnold Classic Europe 2013 in the Men's Physique category in the height category from 178 cm
- Rank in top 3 and win a silver medal in the men's physique category at the world championship

== Adult years ==
At 26 Denis moved to Moscow and started working at the leading premium “World Class” chain as a personal trainer. Since then, Gusev has been continuously improving his theoretical and practical knowledge by attending in-company and other fitness centers training, participating in international fitness conventions and developing himself, and reading a huge amount of specialized methodical literature. There are show business stars, businessmen, politicians and other prominent people among his clients. At the same time, Gusev has not been left unnoticed by the fashion industry of his country because of his physical form. Denis took part in many fashion shows as a fitness model, as well as in numerous commercial and authorial photo and video projects of the most famous Russian photographers. This includes projects for Maxim, GQ, Wedding, Optika Magazine, Zhelezniy Mir and other magazines, as well as video shooting for “Megafon”, “Sinepark”, “Delta”, and “zoombi.ru” advertising companies. Denis was the face on “X fit” fitness chain ads. Also Denis was often on covers of Russian fitness magazines: twice on Muscle and Fitness, Iron World, Gerkules, Fitness Magazine, and Jornl.

Having good theoretical knowledge and experience of the sportsman, and possessing an excellent constitution of the body, Denis achieved high results in bodybuilding. In this case, Denis, who has an attractive appearance, participated in a large number of fashion shows as a fitness model, and got on the cover of magazines:

Currently, Denis is actively continuing his preparations for international competitions. With Denis, a lot of sports videos are filmed. The most famous video featuring him is Супер пресс, on the YouTube network, which has exceeded 4 million views. In it Denis shares the secrets of drawing up a training program for abdominal muscles.

== Sporting activities ==
In 2012, at the age of 31, Denis decided to take part in a classical bodybuilding competition. The sportsman asked Dmitriy Yashankin, the most significant figure in Russia’s fitness community and a multiple world champion, for help in preparation. Dmitriy agreed to help Denis to cope with this uphill struggle. It took the sportsman 3 months to get in shape which helped him to reach the top 10 in this category in Russia. At his very first competition, Gusev won 8th place at the Russian Championship.

In 2013 he fulfilled the standard Master of Sports of Russia in bodybuilding, becoming a bronze medalist in the category "Classic bodybuilding over 180 cm", at the Cup of Russia in Krasnodar. And in the autumn Denis decided to perform in the new category "Men's Physique". In this category, the main criterion is the aesthetics and proportions of the body.

In the autumn season of 2013 Denis Gusev and his coach D. Yashankin made a common decision to compete in the new Men's Physique category. This category is aimed at those who want to develop a fit and aesthetically pleasing body. Denis Gusev won a gold medal at the Arnold Classic Europa tournament in the "Men's Physique" category, in the growth category from 178 cm, becoming the first Russian winner in this category. He was also the first Russian athlete to receive the IFBB Pro card in the Men's Physique category.

In the spring of 2014 Denis made his debut in the Men's Physique IFBB Professional League in the USA. Taking third place at the tournament in Dallas, Gusev became the first ever athlete not to play for the US, to get into the top 3 in the professional tournament in the Men's Physique category. Here are photos of the PRO-card Gusev Denis.

In the autumn of 2015, Denis won the Neva Pro Show tournament, becoming the first Russian athlete who took the first place in the IFBB Pro League tournament. Thanks to this victory, Denis qualified for the main tournament in the world of bodybuilding, the famous "Mr. Olympia" - 2016, which takes place every year at Las Vegas.

== Awards ==
- In 2015, Denis Gusev, was named the most successful media and PRO-bodybuilder in the Russian version of the "Iron Rating" channel.
- In September 2016, Denis received the award of Iron world magazine — Fitness & Media Awards 2016 in the category "Blogger of the year". For a series of video clips see "Road to Olympia".
- In December 2016, Denis was named "Winner of the battle in the media field in Russia", according to Team EastLabs.
- In December 2016, Denis was named “The winner of the battle on the media field of Russia", according to the portal "Team EastLabs".
- In April 2017, Denis was awarded a diploma from the Bodybuilding Federation of Russia for “Great contribution to the development of bodybuilding and fitness in Russia.
- In 2018, Denis was recognized as the most popular and popular athlete according to the version of the sports channel Bodymania. «Bodymania»
- In 2018, Denis was recognized as the most media face of Russian bodybuilding and fitness according to the portal "Team EastLabs"
- In 2019, Denis was awarded the Book of Records of Russia as " the Winner of the largest number of professional tournaments IFBB PRO LEAGUE" "The Book of Records of Russia".

== Contracts ==
History of sponsorship contracts with Denis Gusev:

Year	Brand	Production
2014–2022	Olimp Sport Nutrition	Sports nutrition
2014–2016	Live and Fight	Sportswear
2015–2016	Six Pack Bags	Fitness bags
2015–2017	BodyLab	Online fitness school
2015–2017	Performance Food	Delivery of fitness food
2016–2017	Aesthetix Era	Sportswear
2017 — 2018	Matrix	fitness machines

== Contest history ==
=== Amateur competitions ===
#	Year	Season	Competitions (Federation)	Category	Place	Number of athletes
1	2012	Autumn	Open Championship of the Moscow region (FBFR)	Classic BB, Absolute category	4	14
2	2012	Autumn	Open Championship of Moscow (FBFR)	Classic BB, men over 175 cm	8	13
3	2012	Autumn	Russian Championship (FBFR)	Classic BB, men over 180 cm	8	13
4	2013	Spring	Open Cup of Moscow Region (FBFR)	Classic BB, male absolute	Cup for the best posing; 5	24
5	2013	Spring	Open Cup of Moscow (FBFR)	Classic BB, men over 175 cm	3	15
6	2013	Spring	Cup of Eastern Europe / Open Cup of Russia (FBFR)	Classic B / B, men over 180 cm	3	24
7	2013	Autumn	Women’s World Amateur Championships (IFBB)	Men’s Physique over 178 cm	2	13
8	2013	Autumn	Arnold Classic Europe (IFBB)	Men’s Physique over 178 cm	1	141

=== Professional competitions ===
#	Year	Date	Competition	Location	Place	Numbers of competitors
1	2014	12 April	Grand Prix Pro	Los Angeles, California, USA	16	32
2	2014	3 May	Pittsburgh Pro	Pittsburgh, Pennsylvania, USA	12	31
3	2014	10 May	Europa Dallas Super Show	Dallas, Texas, USA	3	34
4	2014	8 November	Kentucky Muscle Pro	Louisville, Kentucky, USA	14	22
5	2014	15 November	Felicia Romero Pro	Mesa, Arizona, USA	10	26
6	2014	18 October	Fort Lauderdale Pro	Fort Lauderdale, Florida, USA	13	39
7	2014	25 October	Dayana Cadeau Pro Classic	Coral Springs, Florida, USA	3	18
8	2015	18 April	Miami Muscle Beach Pro	Miami, Florida, USA	6	29
9	2015	10 May	New York Pro	Teaneck, New Jersey, USA	16	43
10	2015	31 May	Puerto Rico Pro	San Juan, Puerto Rico	4	21
11	2015	7 November	Neva Pro Show	Saint Petersburg, Russia	1	7
12	2015	15 November	San Marino Pro	San Marino	3	5
13	2016	7 May	Stockholm Pro	Stockholm, Sweden	6	7
14	2016	17 September	Mr. Olympia	Las Vegas, Nevada, USA	16	40
15	2016	24 September	Asia Grand Prix	Seoul, South Korea	5	7
16	2016	29–30 October	Moscow Power Pro Show	Moscow, Russia	4	14
17	2018	13 May	Galaxy Pro	Bari, Italy	1	11
18	2018	3 June	San Marino Pro	San Marino	10	13
19	2018	13 June	Veronica Gallego Pro	Alicante, Spain	6	18
20	2018	18 November	Japan Pro	Tokyo, Japan	7	10
21	2018	25 November	Romania Muscle Fest Pro	Bucharest, Romania	6	17
22	2018	1 December	Jicheng Sanya Classic	Sanya, China	4	10
23	2018	8 December	Shawn Rhoden Classic	Manila, Philippines	1	12
24	2019	3 November	Romania Muscle Fest Pro	Bucharest, Romania	14	24
25	2019	17 November	Japan Pro	Tokyo, Japan	16	27
26	2019	15 December	San Marino Pro	Padova, Italy	11	19
27	2020	11 December	Romania Muscle Fest Pro	Bucharest, Romania	6	17
28	2020	15 December	San Marino Pro	San Marino, San Marino	5	12
29	2021	31 November	KO Pro	Cairo, Egypt	4	19

== Links ==
- Official site #1: Denis's website
- Official site #2: Denis's website #2
- Denis Gusev on Facebook
- Denis Gusev's channel on YouTube
- Denis Gusev on Instagram
