= Sergei Abramov (ice hockey, born 1993) =

Russian ice hockey player

- Born: February 1, 1993 (age 32) Perm, Russia
- Height: 6 ft 2 in (188 cm)
- Weight: 209 lb (95 kg; 14 st 13 lb)
- Position: Centre
- Shoots: Left
- VHL team Former teams: Molot-Prikamie Perm; Amur Khabarovsk
- Playing career: 2013–present

Sergei Abramov (born February 1, 1993) is a Russian professional ice hockey player. He is currently playing with Molot-Prikamie Perm of the Supreme Hockey League (VHL).

Abramov made his Kontinental Hockey League (KHL) debut playing with Amur Khabarovsk during the 2013–14 KHL season.
