= Roman Manukhov =

Russian ice hockey player

- Born: March 11, 1994 (age 31); Yekaterinburg, Sverdlovsk Oblast, Russia
- Height: 6 ft 1 in (185 cm)
- Weight: 194 lb (88 kg; 13 st 12 lb)
- Position: Defence
- Shoots: Left
- KHL team Former teams: Free agent Lokomotiv Yaroslavl; Metallurg Novokuznetsk; Ak Bars Kazan; Avangard Omsk; Traktor Chelyabinsk; HC Sochi
- Playing career: 2009–present

Roman Manukhov (born March 11, 1994) is a Russian professional ice hockey defenceman who is currently an unrestricted free agent. He most recently played for HC Sochi of the Kontinental Hockey League (KHL). He is a one-time Russian Champion.

== Awards and honours ==
Award	Year
KHL
Gagarin Cup (Ak Bars Kazan)	2018
