= Valentin Milyukov =

Kazakhstani ice hockey player

- Born: September 24, 1992 (age 33) Ust-Kamenogorsk, Kazakhstan
- Height: 6 ft 3 in (191 cm)
- Weight: 198 lb (90 kg; 14 st 2 lb)
- Position: Defence
- Shoots: Left
- KHL team: Avangard Omsk
- NHL draft: Undrafted
- Playing career: 2013–present

Valentin Milyukov (born September 24, 1992) is a Kazakhstani professional ice hockey defenceman. He is currently playing with Avangard Omsk of the Kontinental Hockey League (KHL).

Milyukov made his Kontinental Hockey League debut playing with Avangard Omsk during the 2013–14 KHL season.
