= HC Budivelnyk =

Budivelnyk
- Nickname: "Constructor"
- City: Kyiv
- Founded: March 16, 2010
- Folded: June 24, 2010
- Colours
- Owner(s): (Ukraine) PrivatBank
- General manager: (Russia) Oleg Kupryyanov
- Head coach: (Czech Republic) Josef Jandač
- Website: Budivelnik.org

Franchise history
- HC Budivelnyk

HC Budivelnyk (Ukrainian: ХК Будівельник; English: Builder Hockey Club) was a potential professional ice hockey team based in Kyiv, Ukraine. It planned to join the Kontinental Hockey League for the 2010–11 season. However, on June 24, 2010, the team's management announced the postponement of the team's debut in the KHL. If it had joined the KHL, it would have been the first Ukrainian hockey team to compete at the elite level of European hockey since 1996, when the Russian Superleague was formed. The team was owned and operated by the same group as the Kyiv-based basketball club, BC Budivelnyk.

== History ==
=== Formation ===
The team was founded on March 16, 2010 when the KHL announced publicly a letter of intent had been signed declaring the organization's aspirations to join the league for the following season. The product of the Dnipro-based PrivatBank, the vision behind Budivelnyk was to create a team composed of the top Ukrainian hockey players in the world that would also be capable of competing at the highest European level. In similar ambitions, the group intended to promote his basketball team, BC Budivelnyk, to the Euroleague. Operations would be run by team president Bogdan Gulyamov, president of BC Budivelnyk, and team vice president Vyacheslav Zavalnyuk, the acting general manager of Sokil Kyiv and the Ukrainian national team. The team's first general manager was announced to be Oleg Kupriyanov, who had previously acted in the same role for the KHL's Metallurg Magnitogorsk for 19 years. Assistant coach to the Czech national team Josef Jandač was originally announced helm as the team's first head coach, and was to be assisted in his role by longtime NHLer Dmitri Khristich.

The league had planned to experiment with Budivelnyk's rink size, shrinking it to NHL size standards.

== See also ==
- BC Budivelnyk
- Potential Kontinental Hockey League expansion
- Ukrainians in the Kontinental Hockey League
