= Gapa =

Gapa may refer to:

- Gapa, Kuyavian-Pomeranian Voivodeship, a village in north-central Poland
- GAPA Launch Site and Blockhouse, the birthplace of the United States Air Force supersonic missile flight test program
- Gapa, informal name of the Parachutist Badge in Poland
- Gapa, a diminutive of the Russian male first name Agafon
- Gapa, a diminutive of the Russian male first name Agafonik
- Gapa, a diminutive of the Russian male first name Agap
- Gapa, a diminutive of the Russian female first name Agapa
- Gapa, a diminutive of the Russian male first name Agapit
- Gapa, a diminutive of the Russian female first name Agapiya
- Garmisch-Partenkirchen, a town and winter sports venue in the German Alps

== Military ==
- SAM-A-1 GAPA, an early U.S. surface-to-air missile, developed, manufactured and tested by Boeing

== See also ==
- Garmisch-Partenkirchen, a mountain resort in Bavaria, Germany
