= 2013 KHL Junior Draft =

General information
- Date: 25–26 May 2013
- Location: Donetsk, Ukraine

Overview
- League: KHL
- First selection: (Russia) Dmitri Osipov; Selected by: Amur Khabarovsk

The 2013 KHL Junior Draft was the fifth entry draft held by the Kontinental Hockey League (KHL), taking place on 25–26 May 2013 in Druzhba Arena. Ice hockey players from around the world aged between 17 and 21 years of age were selected. Players eligible to take part in the draft were required to not have an active contract with a KHL, MHL or VHL team.

== Selections by round ==
=== Round 1 ===
Rank	Player	Position	Nationality	KHL team	Drafted from	Protected player
1	Dmitri Osipov	D	Russia	Amur Khabarovsk		
2	Yevgeni Svechnikov	F	Russia	Ak Bars Kazan	Bars Kazan	
3	Vladislav Kamenev	F	Russia	Metallurg Magnitogorsk	Stalnie Lisi Magnitogorsk	
4	Semyon Koshelev	F	Kazakhstan	Neftekhimik Nizhnekamsk	Kazzinc-Torpedo-2 (KAZ)	
5	Vladislav Valentsov	D	Russia	SKA St. Petersburg		
6	Alexander Protapovich	C	Russia	Ak Bars Kazan	Bars Kazan	1/5
7	Yegor Korshkov	F	Russia/Kazakhstan	Lokomotiv Yaroslavl		Protected
8	Maxim Lazarev	F	Russia	Ak Bars Kazan	Bars Kazan	2/5
9	Radel Fazleyev	F	Russia	Ak Bars Kazan	Bars Kazan	3/5
10	Mark Marin	D	Russia	Ak Bars Kazan	Bars Kazan	4/5
11	Nikita Yazkov	F	Russia	Metallurg Novokuznetsk	Kuznetskie Medvedi	
12	Maxim Tretiak	G	Russia	CSKA Moskva	Krasnaya Armiya Moskva	
13	Eduard Nasybullin	D	Russia	Ak Bars Kazan	Bars Kazan	
14	Artyom Rasulov	F	Russia	Ak Bars Kazan	Bars Kazan	5/5
15	Roman Khalikov	D	Kazakhstan	HC Donbass	Bars Kazan	
16	Alexei Derzayev	D	Russia	Ak Bars Kazan	Bars Kazan	
17	Semyon Bogachonok	D	Russia	Ak Bars Kazan	Bars Kazan	
18	Daniil Vovchenko	F	Russia	Severstal Cherepovets	Almaz Cherepovets	1/5
19	Alexander Dergachyov	F	Russia	SKA St. Petersburg	Neftyanik Almetievsk	
20	Arkhip Nekolenko	LW	Russia	Spartak Moskva	MHC Spartak	
21	Valentin Razumnyak	F	Russia	Salavat Yulaev Ufa		1/5
22	Dmitry Srednev	F	Russia	Yugra Khanty-Mansiysk	Avto Yekaterinburg	
23	Jakub Vrána	F	Czech Republic	Sibir Novosibirsk	Linköpings HC (SEL)	
24	Artyom Leontyev	G	Russia	Ak Bars Kazan	Bars Kazan	
25	Kasperi Kapanen	LW	Finland	Barys Astana	KalPa (SM-l)	
26	Maxim Letunov	F	Russia	Salavat Yulaev Ufa		
27	Haralds Egle	F	Latvia	Lokomotiv Yaroslavl	Portland Jr. Pirates (EJHL)	
28	Artur Boltanov	F	Russia	Metallurg Magnitogorsk	Stalnie Lisi Magnitogorsk	
29	Ivan Nikolishin	F	Russia	CSKA Moskva	Krasnaya Armiya Moskva	
30	Alexander Mikulovich	D	Russia	Traktor Chelyabinsk		
31	Dmitri Sergeyev	D	Russia	Traktor Chelyabinsk		
32	Ilya Dervuk	D	Russia	Avangard Omsk	Omskie Yastrebi	
33	Ilya Golubev	G	Russia	Ak Bars Kazan	Bars Kazan	
34	David Pastrňák	RW	Czech Republic	Severstal Cherepovets	Södertälje SK (SWE-2)	
35	Shoma Izumi	F	Japan	Admiral Vladivostok	Tomakomai (Japan)	
36	Václav Karabáček	F	Czech Republic	KHL Medveščak	EC Red Bull Salzburg (AUT)	

=== Round 2 ===
Rank	Player	Position	Nationality	KHL team	Drafted from	Protected player
37	Andrei Dergunov	F	Russia	Sibir Novosibirsk	Sibir Novosibirsk	
38	Alexei Suslin	F	Russia	Amur Khabarovsk	Kristall Elektrostal (RUS-3)	
39	Filip Pyrochta	D	Czech Republic	Dinamo Riga	HC Bílí Tygři Liberec (CZE)	
40	Yegor Yakovlev	F	Russia	Avangard Omsk	Omskie Yastrebi	
41	Brandon Fortunato	D	United States	Vityaz Chekhov	USNTDP Juniors (USHL)	
42	Alexander Menshchikov	F	Russia	Metallurg Novokuznetsk	Mechel Chelyabinsk	
43	Andrei Belozyorov	F	Russia	Metallurg Novokuznetsk	Mechel Chelyabinsk	
44	Vadim Klyavzo	D	Belarus	Dinamo Minsk		
45	Andrei Kuzmenko	F	Russia	CSKA Moskva	Krasnaya Armiya Moskva	
46	Rostislav Osipov	D	Russia	Ak Bars Kazan	Irbis Kazan	
47	Pavel Shulepov	F	Russia	Yugra Khanty-Mansiysk	Avtomobilist Yekaterinburg jr.	
48	Rasmus Andersson	D	Sweden	HC Lev Praha	Malmö Redhawks (SWE-2)	
49	Yegor Kulakov	F	Russia	Torpedo Nizhny Novgorod	Khimik Voskresensk jr.	
50	Yegor Kulakov	C	Russia	Spartak Moskva	MHC Spartak	
51	Pavel Jenyš	F	Czech Republic	Sibir Novosibirsk	HC Kometa Brno (CZE)	
52	Jack Eichel	C	United States	Vityaz Chekhov	Boston University Terriers (NCAA)	
53	Kaapo Kähkönen	G	Finland	Barys Astana	Espoo Blues (SM-l)	
54	Dmytro Timashov	F	Sweden / Ukraine	Salavat Yulaev Ufa	MODO jr.	
55	Pavel Kraskovskiy	F	Russia	Lokomotiv Yaroslavl	Loko Yaroslavl	
56	Adrián Holešinský	C	Slovakia	Metallurg Magnitogorsk	VIK Västerås HK jr.	
57	Alexei Sleptsov	D	Russia	CSKA Moskva	Krasnaya Armiya Moskva	
58	Ilya Zinovyev	F	Russia	Traktor Chelyabinsk	Belie Medvedi Chelyabinsk	
59	Mikko Rantanen	F	Finland	Neftekhimik Nizhnekamsk	HC TPS (SM-l)	
60	William Nylander	C	Sweden / Canada	Avangard Omsk	Södertälje SK (SWE-2)	
61	Alexander Gvozdetsky	F	Russia	Ak Bars Kazan	Ak Bars	
62	Vladislav Kodola	F	Belarus	Severstal Cherepovets		2/5
63	Nikita Moiseyev	D	Russia	SKA St. Petersburg		
64	Chong Hyun Lee	F	South Korea / Finland	Admiral Vladivostok	Sun Duck HS (S.Korea)	
65	Jake Virtanen	F	Canada	KHL Medveščak	Calgary Hitmen (WHL)	

=== Round 3 ===
Rank	Player	Position	Nationality	KHL team	Drafted from	Protected player
66	Lukáš Vopelka	C	Czech Republic	SKA St. Petersburg	Örebro HK (SWE)	
67	Kirill Bokov	F	Russia	Ak Bars Kazan	Bars Kazan	
68	Christián Jaroš	D	Slovakia	Dinamo Riga	HC Košice jr.	
69	Igor Lapshov	LW	Russia	Spartak Moskva	IFK Arboga IK (SWE-3)	
70	Ilya Klyauzov	F	Russia	Vityaz Chekhov	Russkie Vityazi Chekhov	
71	Alexei Yatsenko	D	Russia	Avangard Omsk	Avangard Omsk jr.	1/5
72	Dmitri Berlet	D	Russia	Avtomobilist Yekaterinburg	Avto Yekaterinburg	1/5
73	Andrei Klimov	D	Russia	Avtomobilist Yekaterinburg	Avto Yekaterinburg	2/5
74	Andrei Klimov	F	Russia	Metallurg Novokuznetsk	Avto Yekaterinburg	
75	Vladislav Zakharov	D	Russia	Metallurg Novokuznetsk	Avto Yekaterinburg	
76	Roman Serafimovich	F	Belarus	Dinamo Minsk	Rus Moskva	
77	Yegor Ogiyenko	D	Russia	CSKA Moskva	Krasnaya Armiya Moskva	1/5
78	Maxim Nalyotov	F	Russia	Amur Khabarovsk	Kristall Elektrostal (RUS-3)	
79	Ivan Silayev	F	Russia	CSKA Moskva	Krasnaya Armiya Moskva	2/5
80	Andrei Svetlakov	F	Russia	CSKA Moskva	Krasnaya Armiya Moskva	3/5
81	Maxim Orlov	D	Russia	Salavat Yulaev Ufa	Krasnaya Armiya Moskva	
82	Artyom Osipov	F	Russia	Vityaz Chekhov	Russkie Vityazi Chekhov	1/5
83	Otto Nieminen	RW	Finland	Atlant Mytishchi	HC TPS (SM-l)	
84	Karel Vejmelka	G	Czech Republic	HC Lev Praha	SK Horácká Slavia Třebíč (CZE-2)	
85	Damir Sharipzyanov	D	Russia	Neftekhimik Nizhnekamsk	Reaktor Nizhnekamsk	
86	Juraj Šiška	C	Slovakia	HC Slovan Bratislava	HK Nitra (SVK)	
87	Nikita Lyamkin	D	Russia	Metallurg Novokuznetsk	Kuznetskie Medvedi	1/5
88	Sergei Boykov	D	Russia	Metallurg Novokuznetsk	Kuznetskie Medvedi	2/5
89	Alexander Kregan	F	Russia	Metallurg Novokuznetsk	Kuznetskie Medvedi	3/5
90	Artyom Shulyov	D	Russia	Sibir Novosibirsk	Khimik Voskresensk jr.	
91	Vladislav Barulin	F	Russia	Severstal Cherepovets	Krylya Sovetov Moskva jr.	
92	Dmitri Grents	F	Kazakhstan	Barys Astana	Torpedo Ust-Kamenogorsk jr.	
93	Bogdan Shleyev	F	Russia	Salavat Yulaev Ufa	Neftekhimik Nizhnekamsk jr.	
94	Yegor Tsvetkov	D	Russia	Lokomotiv Yaroslavl	Loko Yaroslavl	
95	Vladislav Antonov	D	Russia	Metallurg Magnitogorsk	Metallurg Magnitogorsk jr.	
96	Yevgeni Nazarkin	D	Russia	Traktor Chelyabinsk	Traktor Chelyabinsk jr.	
97	Tagir Khafizov	D	Russia	Neftekhimik Nizhnekamsk	Neftekhimik Nizhnekamsk jr.	
98	Emil Johansson	D	Sweden	Atlant Mytishchi	HV71 jr. (SWE jr.)	
99	Maxim Kulikov	F	Russia	Traktor Chelyabinsk	Traktor Chelyabinsk jr.	1/5
100	Filip Karlsson	C	Sweden	Avangard Omsk	Rögle BK jr. (SWE jr.)	
101	TKamil Mingazov	D	Russia	Ak Bars Kazan	Irbis Kazan	
102	Juho Lammikko	LW	Finland	Atlant Mytishchi	Ässät (SM-l)	
103	Maxim Kuteinikov	G	Russia / Finland	Admiral Vladivostok	EPS jr. (FIN-jr)	
104	Nino Ondris	F	Slovakia	KHL Medveščak	HK Dukla Trenčín jr. (SVK-jr)	

=== Round 4 ===
Rank	Player	Position	Nationality	KHL team	Drafted from	Protected player
105	Tomáš Havlín	D	Czech Republic	HC Lev Praha	HC Bílí Tygři Liberec	
106	Sergui Bolshakov	G	Russia	Amur Khabarovsk	HK Spartak Moscow	
107	Artur Lauta	A	United States	Dinamo Riga→Avangard Omsk	Avangard Omsk	2/5
108	Vyatcheslav Novitsky	G	Russia	Dinamo Riga→Avangard Omsk	Avangard Omsk	3/5
109	Dāvis Zembergs	A	Latvia	Dinamo Riga	Boston Bandits (EmJHL)	
110	Kirill Ablayev	D	Russia	HK Spartak Moscow	Vityaz Chekhov	
111	Yevgeni Voronkov	D	Russia	HK CSKA Moscow	HK CSKA Moscow	
112	Viktor Kartachov	A	Russia	Metallurg Novokuznetsk	Gazovik Tyumen	
113	Dmitri Baboshin	A	Russia	Torpedo Nizhny Novgorod	Krylya Sovetov	
114	Grigori Veremyov	A	Belarus	HK Dinamo Minsk	RCOP Raubichi	
115	Ulib-Gleb Berezovskyy	A	Germany Ukraine	Donbass Donetsk	Jungadler Mannheim	
116	Ilya Teryokhin	A	Russia	Neftekhimik Nizhnekamsk	Lada Togliatti	
117	Nikita Zhuldikov	D	Russia	Yugra Khanty-Mansiysk→Traktor Chelyabinsk	Traktor Chelyabinsk	
118	Semion Afonassievski	A	Russia	Yugra Khanty-Mansiysk→Traktor Tcheliabinsk	Traktor Tcheliabinsk	
119	Artyom Melikov	A	Russia	Yugra Khanty-Mansiysk→Traktor Chelyabinsk	Traktor Chelyabinsk	
120	Maksim Korinevsky	A	Russia	Yugra Khanty-Mansiysk→Traktor Chelyabinsk	Traktor Chelyabinsk	
121	Kirill Peregudov	A	Russia	Yugra Khanty-Mansiysk	Gazovik Tyumen	
122	Samuel Ollender	A	Czech Republic	HC Lev Praha	HC Vítkovice U18	
123	Maxim Sidorov	G	Russia	Lokomotiv Yaroslavl	Lokomotiv Yaroslavl	
124	Patrik Koch	D	Slovakia Czech Republic	HC Slovan Bratislava	HC Kometa Brno U18	
125	Adrian Sloboda	D	Slovakia	Severstal Cherepovets→HC Slovan Bratislava	HC Slovan Bratislava	1/5
126	Ivan Zhuravlev	D	Russia	Severstal Cherepovets	Krylya Sovetov	
127	Nikolaj Ehlers	A	Denmark	Avangard Omsk	HC Bienne	
128	Alikhan Asetov	A	Kazakhstan	Barys Astana	Kazzinc-Torpedo Ust-Kamenogorsk	
129	Stanislav Kandzyuba	D	Russia	Salavat Yulaev Ufa	OHK Dynamo	
130	Jakob Forsbacka Karlsson	C	Sweden	Lokomotiv Yaroslavl	Linköpings HC (SuperElit)	
131	Vitali Kudrin	A	Russia	Metallurg Magnitogorsk	Metallurg Magnitogorsk	
132	Dylan Larkin	A	United States	HK Vityz	USA HNTDP (USHL)	
133	Yevgeni Ugryumov	G	Russia	Traktor Chelyabinsk	Traktor Chelyabinsk	
134	Yegor Orlov	D	Russia	OHK Dynamo	OHK Dynamo	
135	No pick made			Avangard Omsk		
136	Vladislav Osipov	A	Russia	Ak Bars Kazan	Ak Bars Kazan	
137	Andreas Englund	D	Sweden	SKA Saint-Petersbourg	Djurgården Hockey (SuperElit)	
138	Danil Svinukhov	D	Kazakhstan	Admiral Vladivostok	Kazzinc-Torpedo Ust-Kamenogorsk	
139	Jiri Smejkal	A	Czech Republic	KHL Medveščak	HC České Budějovice	

=== Round 5 ===
Rank	Player	Position	Nationality	KHL team	Drafted from	Protected player
140	Valeri Tkachyov	A	Russia	Neftekhimik Nizhnekamsk	Traktor Chelyabinsk	
141	Alexei Simanzhenkov	A	Russia	Amur Khabarovsk	Khimik Voskresensk	
142	Anton Ugolnikov	A	United States	Dinamo Riga→Avangard Omsk	Avangard Omsk	4/5
143	Rodrigo Abols	A	Latvia	Dinamo Riga	SK Riga	
144	Nikita Mocharov	A	Russia	Traktor Chelyabinsk	Traktor Chelyabinsk	
145	Kirill Pilipenko	A	Russia	OHK Dynamo	OHK Dynamo	
146	Kirill Shchukin	D	Russia	Metallurg Novokuznetsk	Metallurg Novokuznetsk	
147	Artyom Semichastnov	D	Russia	Torpedo Nizhny Novgorod	Krylya Sovetov	
148	Stepan Falkovsky	D	Belarus	HK Dinamo Minsk	HK Yunost Minsk	
149	Maxim Luzhansky	D	Russia	Metallurg Novokuznetsk	Molot-Prikamye Perm	
150	Rustem Shamilov	D	Russia	Ak Bars Kazan	Ak Bars Kazan	
151	Timofei Menshchikov	D	Russia	Yugra Khanty-Mansiysk→Metallurg Magnitogorsk	Metallurg Magnitogorsk	1/5
152	Nikita Kharkin	D	Russia	Yugra Khanty-Mansiysk	Metallurg Magnitogorsk	
153	Josef Stribrny	A	Czech Republic	HC Lev Praha	HC Litvínov U18	
154	Sergei Bronnikov	G	Russia	Neftekhimik Nizhnekamsk→Metallurg Magnitogorsk	Metallurg Magnitogorsk	2/5
155	Alexander Trushkov	G	Russia	Neftekhimik Nizhnekamsk→HK Spartak Moscow	HK Spartak Moscow	1/5
156	Ivan Fedotov	G	Russia	Neftekhimik Nizhnekamsk	Kristall Elektrostal (Pervaïa Liga)	
157	Lukas Berak	A	Slovakia	HC Slovan Bratislava	HC Dukla Trenčín	
158	Kirill Kovalevsky	A	Russia	Sibir Novosibirsk→HK CSKA Moscow	HK CSKA Moscow	4/5
159	Mikhail Stepanov	D	Russia	Sibir Novosibirsk	Khimik Voskresensk	
160	Danil Shchyogolev	D	Russia	Severstal Cherepovets → Avangard Omsk	Avangard Omsk	5/5
161	Gustaf Franzén	C	Sweden	Severstal Cherepovets	HV71	
162	Joel Kiviranta	A	Finland	Avangard Omsk	Jokerit	
163	Oskar Lindblom	A	Sweden	Lokomotiv Yaroslavl	Brynäs IF	
164	Anton Karlsson	A	Sweden	Lokomotiv Yaroslavl	Frölunda HC	
165	Denis Yefimov	D	Russia	Metallurg Magnitogorsk	Metallurg Magnitogorsk	
166	No pick made			HK CSKA Moscow		
167	Brayden Point	C	Canada	Traktor Chelyabinsk	Moose Jaw Warriors (WHL)	
168	Ivan Igumnov	A	Russia	OHK Dynamo	OHK Dynamo	
169	Ivan Rodionov	D	Russia	Avangard Omsk	Avangard Omsk	
170	Farkhat Minabutdinov	A	Russia	Ak Bars Kazan	Ak Bars Kazan	
171	Aaron Ekblad	D	Canada	HK Vityaz	Barrie Colts (OHL)	
172	Nikita Bazhenov	A	Russia	Admiral Vladivostok → Sibir Novosibirsk	Sibir Novosibirsk	1/5
173	Dmitri Anikin	A	Russia	Admiral Vladivostok	Molot-Prikamye Perm	
174	Stanislav Skorvanek	G	Slovakia	KHL Medveščak	MsHK Žilina	

== Selections per nation ==
The table shows the number of players selected by which country they played in prior to the draft:

Country	Players
Russia	113
Czech Republic	11
Sweden	10
Slovakia	8
Finland	6
Kazakhstan	5
Belarus	5
United States	4
Canada	3
Latvia	3
Japan	1
South Korea	1
Germany	1
Denmark	1

== See also ==
- 2013–14 KHL season
- 2013 NHL entry draft
- KHL territorial pick
