= Ageyev =

Ageyev (Russian: Аге́ев; masculine) or Ageyeva (Аге́ева; feminine) is a Russian surname. Variants of this surname include Aggeyev/Aggeyeva (Агге́ев/Агге́ева), Ageyenko (Аге́енко), Ageyenkov/Ageyenkova (Аге́енков/Аге́енкова), Ageykin/Ageykina (Аге́йкин/Аге́йкина), Agin/Agina (А́гин/А́гина), Agish (Аги́ш), Agishev/Agisheva (Аги́шев/Аги́шева), Agishin/Agishina (Аги́шин/Аги́шина), Agishchev/Agishcheva (Аги́щев/Аги́щева), Agushev/Agusheva (Агу́шев/Агу́шева), Ogiyenko (Огие́нко), and Ogishin/Ogishina (Оги́шин/Оги́шина).

All these surnames derive from various forms of the Christian male given name Aggey (from the Biblical Hebrew word meaning festive), although it's also possible that the forms starting with "Agish-", "Agishch-", and "Agush-" were derived from the given name Agapy or Agafon. The following people share this surname:

- Aleksandr Ageyev (born 1996), Russian association football player
- Alla Ageyeva, birth name of Masha Rasputina (born 1965), Russian pop singer
- M. Ageyev (1898–1973), pen name of Mark Levi, Russian novelist
- Natalya Ageyeva, the artistic director of the Russian Chamber Music Foundation of Seattle
- Sergey Ageyev (born 1968), Russian association football player
- Sergei Ageyev (ice hockey) (Sergey Ageyev) (born 1984), Russian ice hockey player
- Svetlana Ageyeva, Soviet actress cast in the 1965 Soviet comedy Operation Y and Shurik's Other Adventures
- Viktor Ageyev (1936–2023), Soviet Olympic water polo player
- Viktor Ageyev (boxer) (1941–2025), Soviet and Russian boxer
- Vira Ageyeva, Ukrainian literary critic and philologist
- Vladimir Ageyev (1932–2024), Soviet Chuvash painter
- Yevgeny Ageyev (born 1976), Russian association football player

== See also ==
- Ageyevo, several inhabited localities in Russia
