= Gasha =

Gasha may refer to:

- Gasha (Peru), a mountain in Peru
- Gasha (singer), from Cameroon
- Gasha, Republic of Dagestan, a rural locality in Dagestan, Russia
- Gasha, Kachin, a village in Mansi Township, Kachin State, Burma
- Gasha, a diminutive of the Russian male first name Agafon
- Gasha, a diminutive of the Russian male first name Agap
- Gasha, a diminutive of the Russian male first name Agapit
