= Ogiyenko =

Ogiyenko (Russian: Огие́нко) is a Russian last name, a variant of Ageyev. However, unlike "Ageyev", which derives from the first name Aggey, this last name, as well as its variant Ogishin (masculine)/Ogishina (feminine) (Оги́шин/Оги́шина), derive either from the first name "Ogiy" (Ukrainian: Огiй), which is the Ukrainian form of "Aggey", or from its derivative "Ogisha".

People with the last name

- Denis Ogienko (Ogiyenko), bronze medal winner in the half-middleweight men's judo event at the 2003 Summer Universiade
- Valentina Ogienko (Ogiyenko) (b. 1965), Soviet Olympic volleyball player
- Yegor Ogiyenko, Russian ice hockey player selected in Round 3 of the 2013 KHL Junior Draft
