= Agafonov =

Agafonov (Russian: Агафо́нов; masculine) or Agafonova (Агафо́нова; feminine) is a Russian surname. It derives from the given name Agafon, borrowed from Greek, where it meant kindness, goodness.

The following people share this surname:

- Aleksandr Agafonov (born 1975), Uzbekistani Olympic swimmer
- Alexandra Agafonova, Russian swimmer, silver medalist at the 2014 IPC Swimming European Championships – Women's 50 meter backstroke
- Alisa Agafonova (born 1991), Ukrainian figure skater
- Andrey Agafonov (born 1979), Russian association football player
- Kseniya Agafonova (born 1983), Russian long-distance runner
- Maria Agafonova (born 2005), Russian artistic gymnast
- Mikhail Agafonov, Russian operatic tenor
- Nikolai Agafonov (born 1947), Soviet and Russian association football player and coach
- Polina Agafonova (born 1996), Russian figure skater

== See also ==
- Agafonova, alternative name of the rural locality (a village) of Agafonovo in Odintsovsky District of Moscow Oblast, Russia
- Agafonovo, several rural localities in Russia
