= Agapka =

Agapka may refer to:

- Agapka, a diminutive of the Russian male first name Agap
- Agapka, a diminutive of the Russian male first name Agapit
