= Aganya =

Aganya may refer to:

- Aganya, a diminutive of the Russian first name Agafon
- Aganya, a diminutive of the Russian first name Agap
