= Agafosha =

Agafosha may refer to:

- Agafosha, a diminutive of the Russian male first name Agafon
- Agafosha, a diminutive of the Russian male first name Agafonik
