= Agapion =

Agapion (Russian: Агапио́н) is an old and rare Russian male first name. It is derived from the Greek verb agapaō, meaning to love.

The patronymics derived from "Agapion" are "Агапио́нович" (Agapionovich; masculine) and "Агапио́новна" (Agapionovna; feminine).

== See also ==
- Agap
- Agapa
