= Gafon =

Gafon may refer to:

- Gafon, a diminutive of the Russian male first name Agafon
- Gafon, a diminutive of the Russian male first name Agafonik
