= Agafonya =

Agafonya may refer to:

- Agafonya, a diminutive of the Russian male first name Agafon
- Agafonya, a diminutive of the Russian male first name Agafonik
