= Agapius =

Agapius may refer to:

- Agapius, traditionally one of the companions of Aphrodisius
- Agapius of Spain (died 259), Christian martyr, died at Citra
- Agapius of Palestine (died 303/304), Christian martyr, beheaded along with many others under Great Persecution of Diocletian
- Agapius of Edessa (died 304), Christian martyr and one of three sons of St Bassa
- Agapius (died 306), a Christian martyr drowned at Caesarea
- Agapius of Caesarea, Bishop of Caesarea (c. 303–c. 312), predecessor to Eusebius
- Agapius (soldier) (died 315), Christian martyr and soldier, burned with Carterius and others in Armenia
- Agapius of Novara (died 447), Bishop of Novara for over 30 years - see Roman Catholic Diocese of Novara
- Agapius (Manichaean), 4th or 5th century Manichaean philosopher and possible disciple of Mani
- Agapius of Alexandria, 5th century ancient physician from Alexandria
- Agapius of Athens, 5th-6th century Neoplatonist philosopher from Athens
- Agapius of Hierapolis (died after 942), Arab Christian bishop of Manbij (Hierapolis) and historian
- Agapios I of Antioch, patriarch (r. 953–959)
- Agapios II of Antioch, patriarch (r. 978–996)
- Agapius of Galatista (1710–1752), saint and martyr
