= Silayev (surname) =

Silayev, also spelt Silaev and Silajev, may refer to:

- Aleksandr Silayev (1928–2005), Soviet spring canoer
- Anton Silayev (born 2006), Russian ice hockey player
- Boris Silayev (born 1946), Kyrgyz politician
- Ivan Silayev (1930–2023), Soviet and later Russian politician
- Ivan Silayev (ice hockey) (born 1996), Russian ice hockey player

== See also ==
- Silayev's Government, Ivan Silayev's Soviet Cabinet
