= Agishev =

Agishev (Russian: Аги́шев; masculine) or Agisheva (Аги́шева; feminine) is a Russian-language last name, possibly a variant of Ageyev. It is also possible that it derived from the first name Agapy or Agafon.

People with the last name

- Dana Agisheva
- Dina Agisheva
- Ravil Agishev, Soviet association football player for Pakhtakor Tashkent FK
- Sagit Agishev, birth name of Sagit Agish (1904–1973), Bashkir poet, writer, and playwright
- Takhir Agishev, Kazakhstani Muay Thai fighter at the Muay event at the 2014 Asian Beach Games
- Vadim Agishev, Uzbekistani referee at the 2012 AFC U-16 Championship qualification
- Vladimir Agishev, Soviet shooter participating at the 50 meter rifle three positions event at the 1972 Summer Olympics
- Yakov Agishev, Soviet rally driver participating at the World Rally Championship
