= Agin (surname) =

Agin (Russian: А́гин; masculine) or Agina (А́гина; feminine) is a Russian last name. In general, it can be either a variant of the last name Ageyev (derived from the first name Aggey), or it could be a derivative of other names starting with "Ag-" (such as Agafon, Agapy, Agey).

However, the last name of the Russian aristocratic family of Agins (of whom Alexander Agin in the list below is one of the representatives) has a different origin. In the 18th–19th centuries, a tradition existed in Russia to give an abbreviated last name of the father (with the first syllable omitted) to illegitimately born children. The last name "Agin" in particular is an abbreviated form of the last name Yelagin.

People with the last name

- Alexander Agin (1817–1875), Russian painter who illustrated one of the editions of Dead Souls. The family name was originally Yelagin
- Daniel Agina, Kenyan association football player
- Sydney Agina, Kenyan footballer
- Zeynep Nur Agin (born 2007), Turkish female karateka
