= Agafonovo =

Agafonovo (Russian: Агафоново) is the name of several rural localities in Russia:

- Agafonovo, Kirov Oblast, a village in Lyumpanursky Rural Okrug of Sanchursky District in Kirov Oblast; 56°56′N 46°55′E
- Agafonovo, Odintsovsky District, Moscow Oblast, a village in Nikolskoye Rural Settlement of Odintsovsky District in Moscow Oblast; 55°37′N 36°35′E
- Agafonovo, Podolsky District, Moscow Oblast, a village in Strelkovskoye Rural Settlement of Podolsky District in Moscow Oblast; 55°27′N 37°39′E
- Agafonovo, Krasnogorodsky District, Pskov Oblast, a village in Krasnogorodsky District of Pskov Oblast
- Agafonovo, Novorzhevsky District, Pskov Oblast, a village in Novorzhevsky District of Pskov Oblast
- Agafonovo, Pskovsky District, Pskov Oblast, a village in Pskovsky District of Pskov Oblast
- Agafonovo, Sandovsky District, Tver Oblast, a village in Toporovskoye Rural Settlement of Sandovsky District in Tver Oblast
- Agafonovo, Zapadnodvinsky District, Tver Oblast, a village in Benetskoye Rural Settlement of Zapadnodvinsky District in Tver Oblast
- Agafonovo, Gorokhovetsky District, Vladimir Oblast, a village in Gorokhovetsky District of Vladimir Oblast
- Agafonovo, Vyaznikovsky District, Vladimir Oblast, a village in Vyaznikovsky District of Vladimir Oblast
- Agafonovo, Kirillovsky District, Vologda Oblast, a village in Kovarzinsky Selsoviet of Kirillovsky District in Vologda Oblast
- Agafonovo, Sokolsky District, Vologda Oblast, a village in Chuchkovsky Selsoviet of Sokolsky District in Vologda Oblast
- Agafonovo, Danilovsky District, Yaroslavl Oblast, a village in Yermakovsky Rural Okrug of Danilovsky District in Yaroslavl Oblast
- Agafonovo, Nekouzsky District, Yaroslavl Oblast, a village in Novinsky Rural Okrug of Nekouzsky District in Yaroslavl Oblast
