= Agin =

Agin may refer to:

- Ağın, a town in Turkey
- Agin, alternative name of Aghin, a town in Armenia
- Agin (surname), Russian last name
- Agin, a deity in Scythian religion
