= Neftekhimik Nizhnekamsk =

Neftekhimik Nizhnekamsk may refer to:

- HC Neftekhimik Nizhnekamsk, ice hockey club
- FC Neftekhimik Nizhnekamsk, football club
- Neftekhimik Ice Palace, home arena for HC Neftekhimik Nizhnekamsk
