= Elena Zelenskaya =

Russian opera singer

- Елена Зеленская
- Born: 1 June 1961 (age 63); Baku, Soviet Azerbaijan
- Occupation: Operatic soprano
- Years active: 2009-present

Elena Emilievna Zelenskaya (Russian: Елена Эмильевна Зеленская, romanized: Yelena Emilyevna Zelenskaya, born 1 June 1961) is a Russian operatic soprano at the Bolshoi Theatre.

== Career ==
From 20 May to 5 June 2009, Zelenskaya, along with Aleksandr Antonenko, Mikhail Agafonov, James Morris, Christian Jean, and Matteo Peiron, performed Giacomo Puccini's Tosca, which was conducted by Stefan Solyom. In 2010, Zelenskaya performed Benjamin Britten's War Requiem, which was conducted by Tadaaki Otaka and had a cast of such singers as Timothy Robinson and Stephan Loges.

From 21-22 November 2014, Zelenskaya performed Classic Nights in Romania, along with Margarita Mamsirova, Lolita Semenina, and Roman Muravitsky.

== See also ==
- List of Russian opera singers
