= Ageykin =

Ageykin (Russian: Аге́йкин; masculine) or Ageykina (Аге́йкина; feminine) is a Russian last name, a variant of Ageyev.

People with the last name

- Irina Ageikina (Ageykina), 2008 winner in the Best Female Performance category at the Eurasia International Film Festival
- Sergei Ageikin (Sergey Ageykin), Russian ice hockey player who died during his playing career
