= List of indoor arenas in Russia =

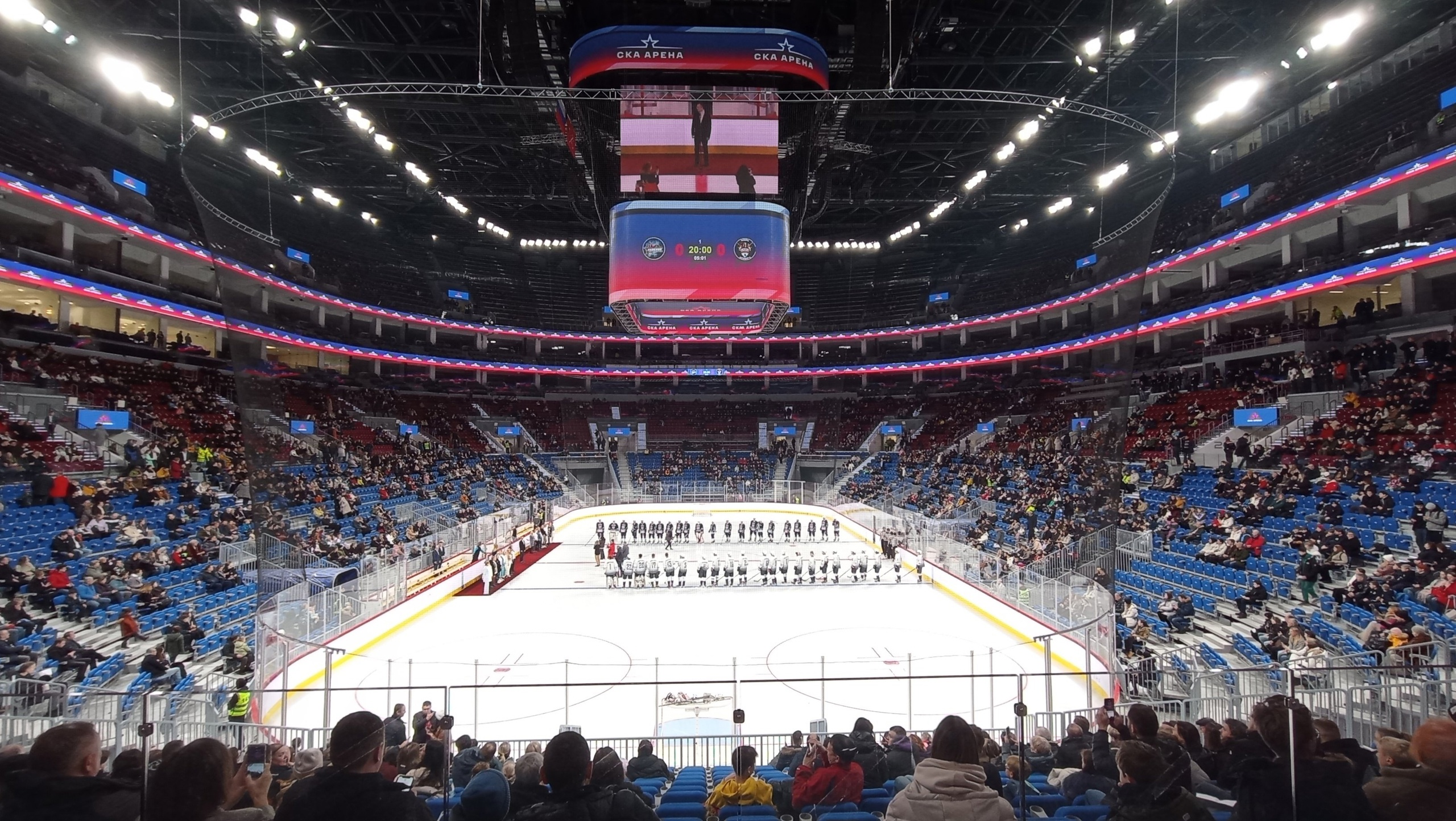
The 21,542-capacity SKA Arena

The 12,588-capacity UMMC Arena (Yekaterinburg)

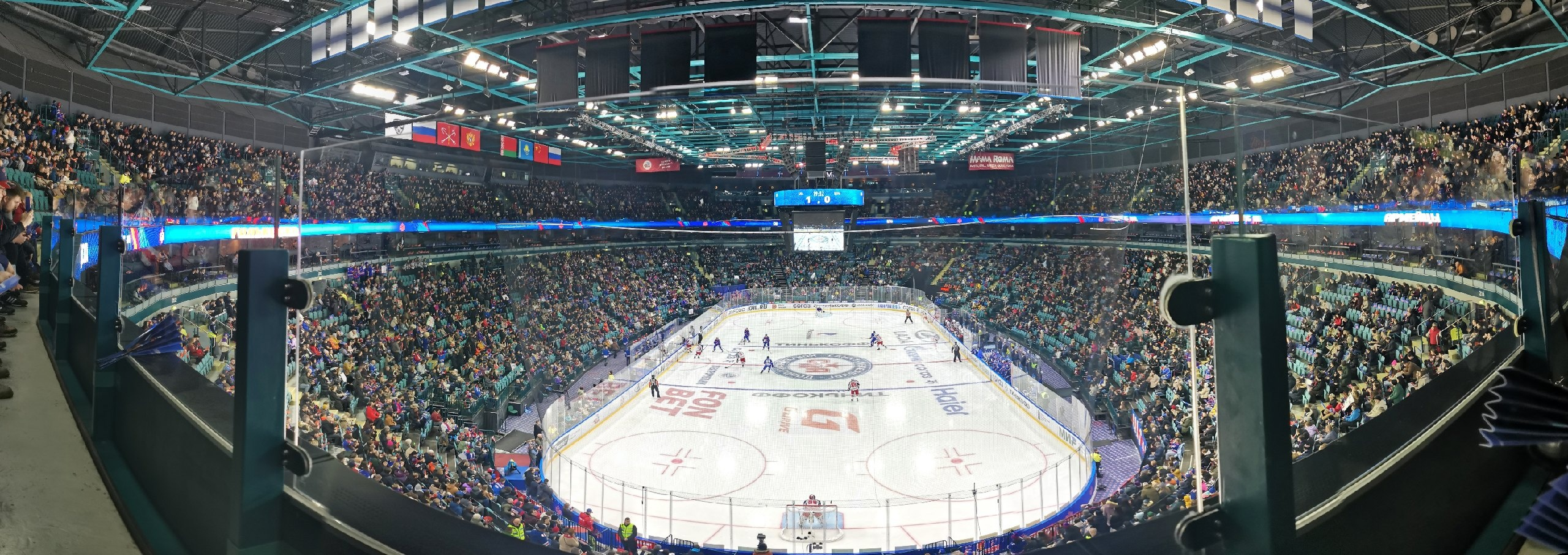
The 12,452-capacity St. Petersburg Ice Palace

The 12,350-capacity Volga Arena

Bolshoy Ice Dome]]

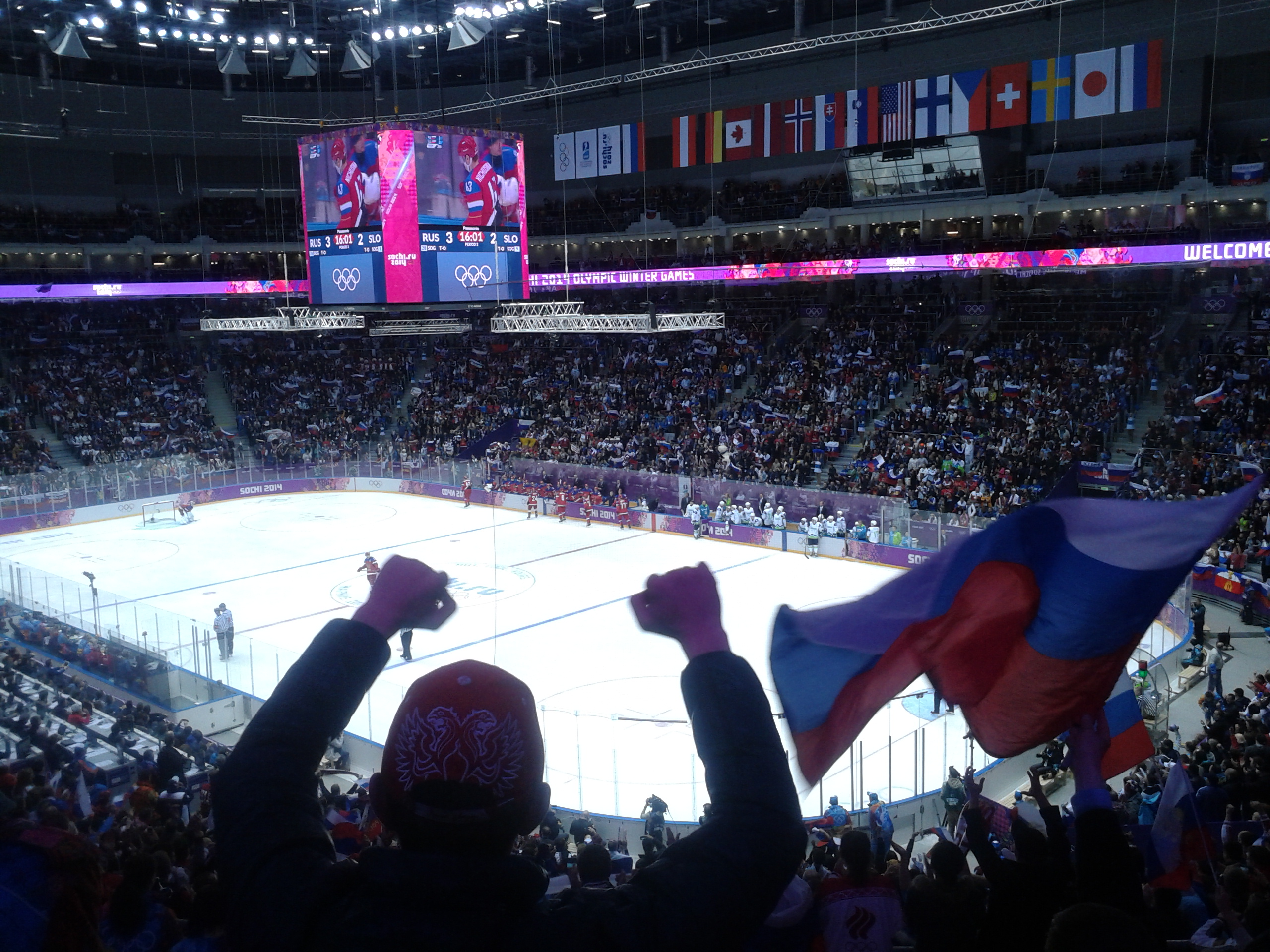
The 12,035-capacity Bolshoy Ice Dome

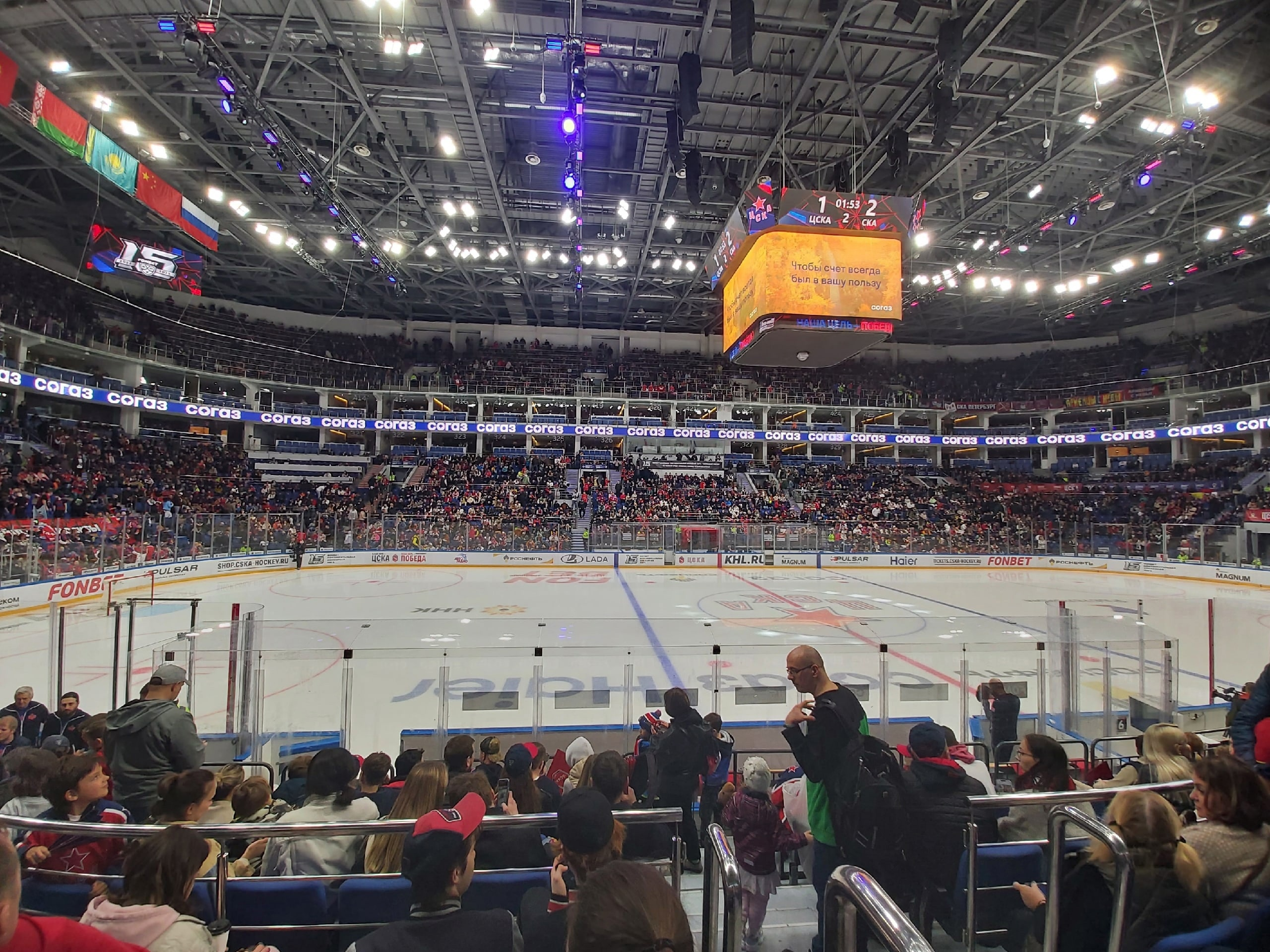
The 12,100-capacity CSKA Arena

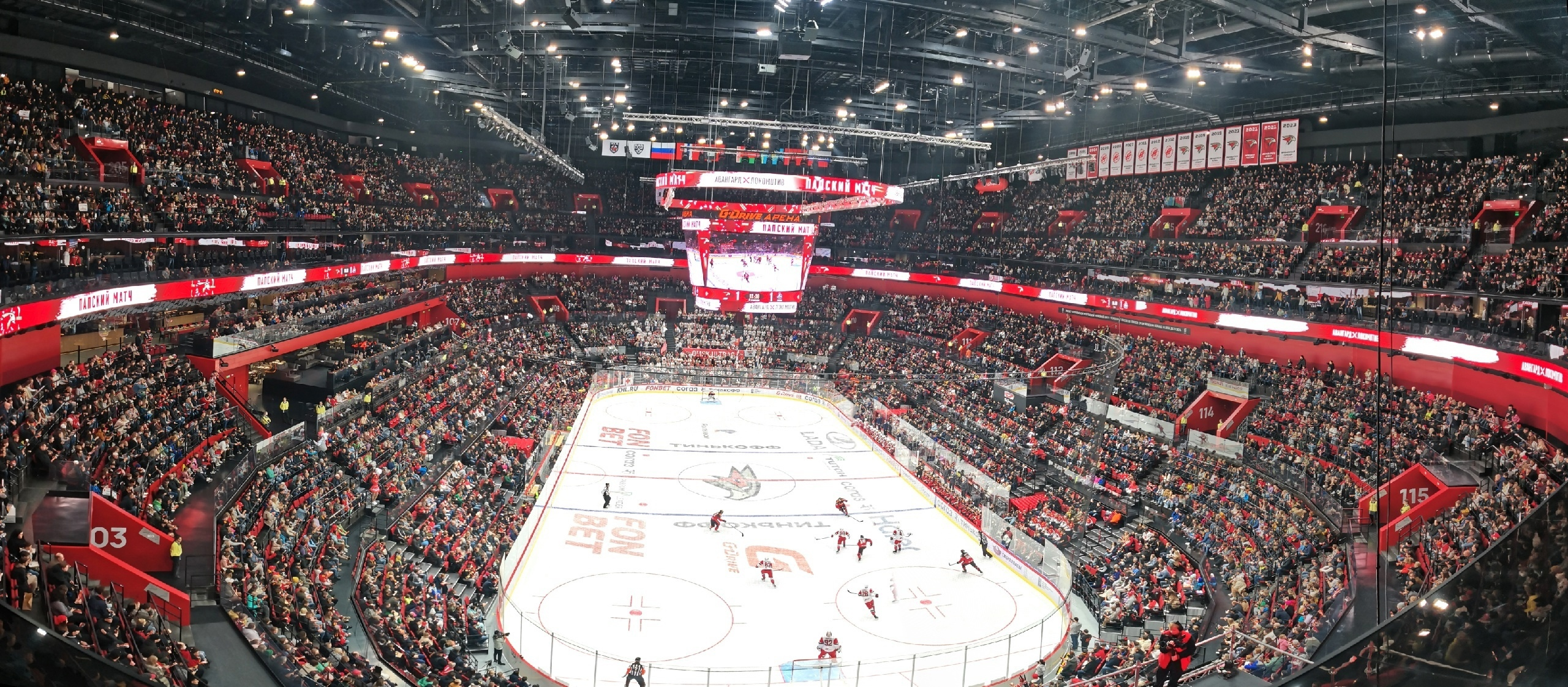
The 12,011-capacity G-Drive Arena

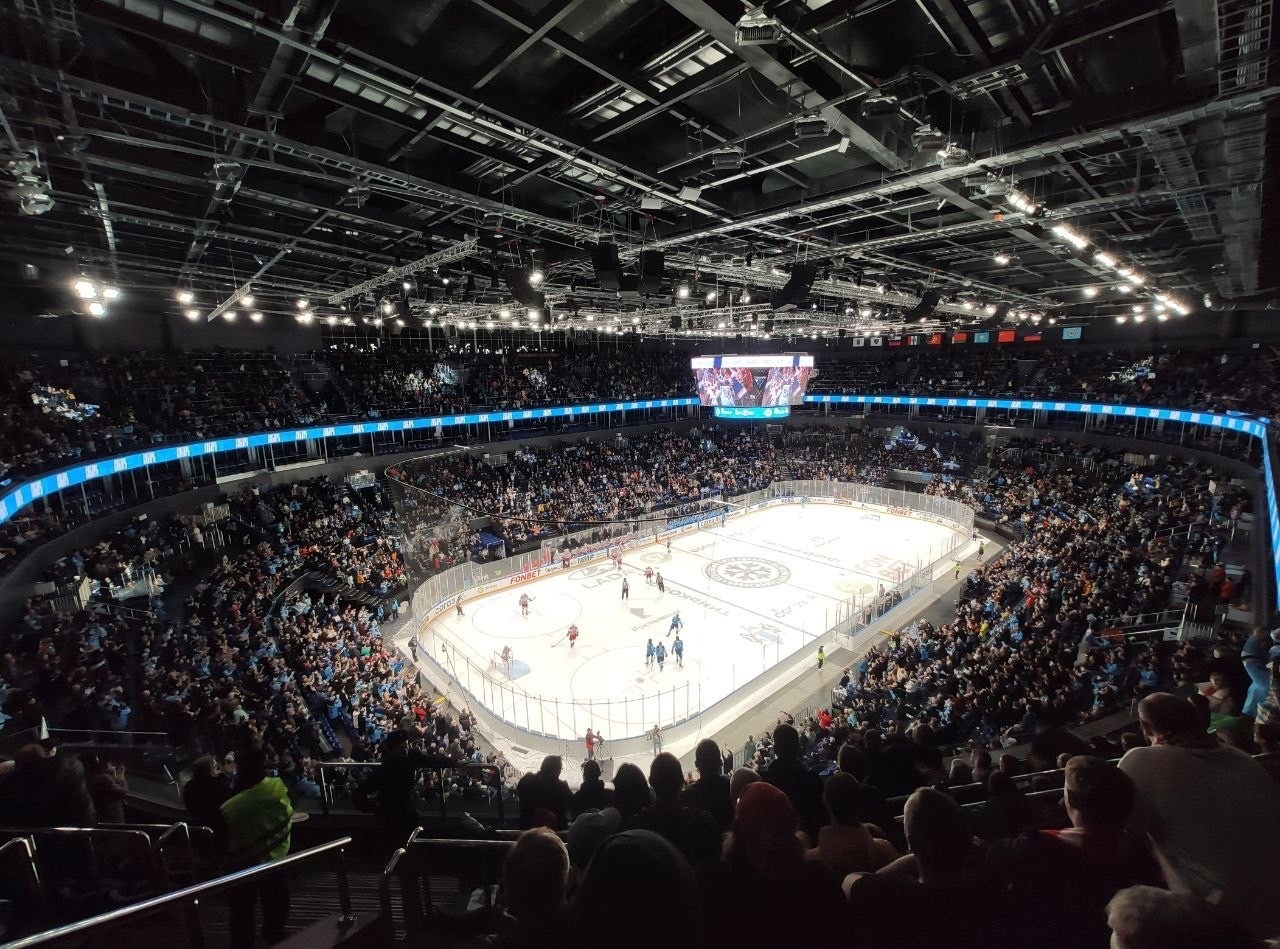
The 11,860-capacity Sibir Arena

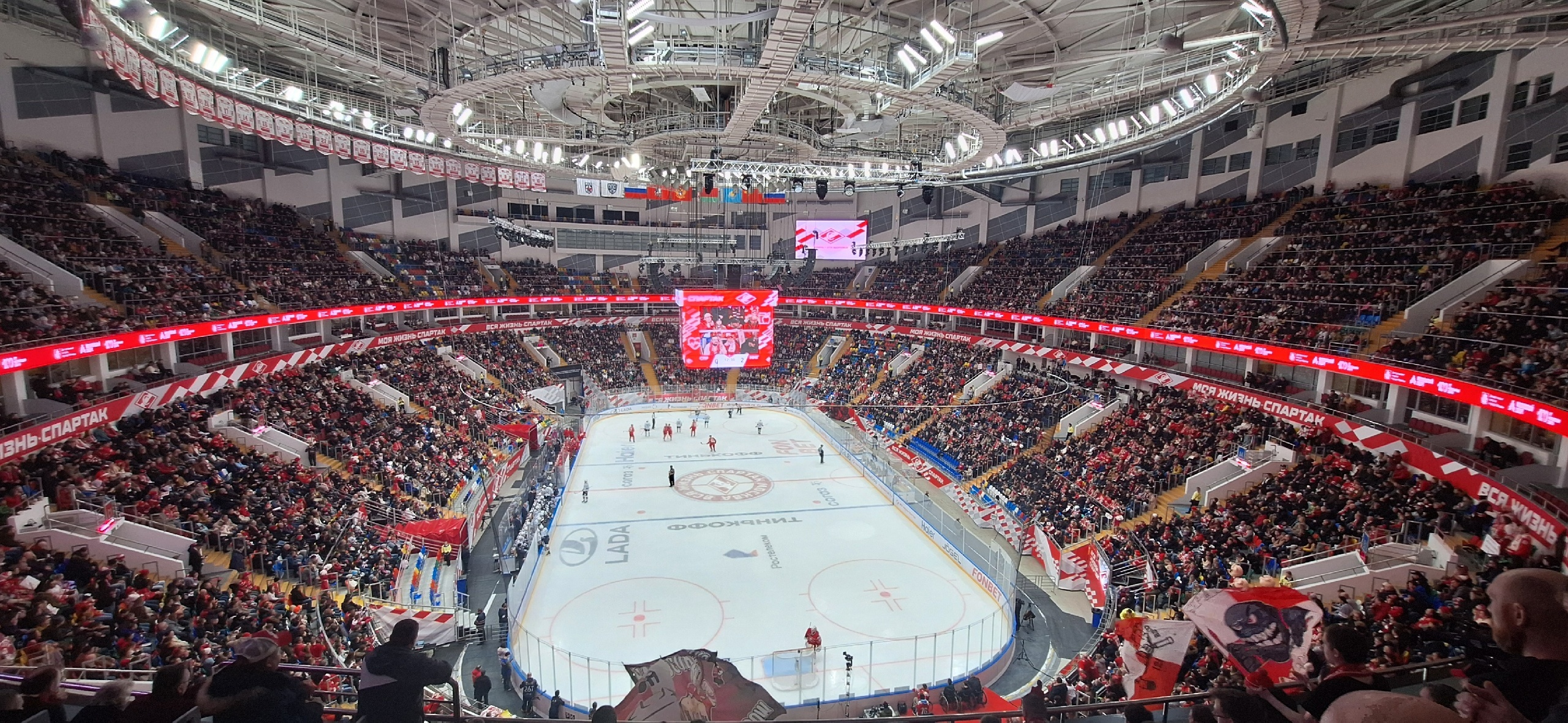
The 11,748-capacity Megasport Sport Palace

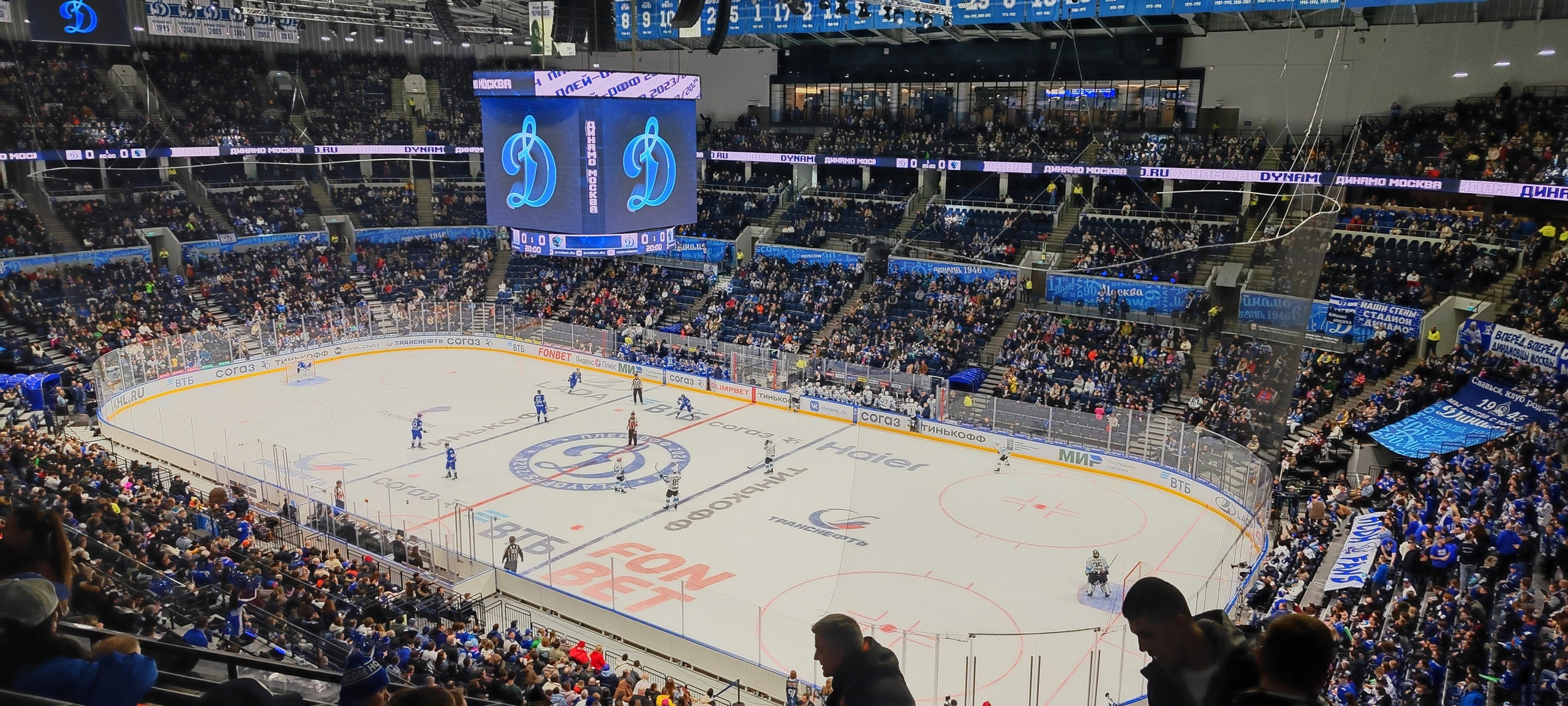
The 10,523-capacity VTB Arena

The following is a list of indoor arenas in Russia with capacity of at least 4,000 spectators. Most of the arenas in this list are multi-propose facilities for uses such as individual sports, team sports as well as cultural and political events.

== Currently in use ==
Location	Arena	Date built	Capacity
Angarsk	Yermak Sports Palace	2010	6,900
Balashikha	Balashikha Arena	2007	6,000
Belgorod	Belgorod Arena	2021	10,100
Chelyabinsk	Traktor Ice Arena	2009	7,517
Cheboksary	Cheboksary Arena	2015	7,500
Cherepovets	Ice Palace	2007	6,000
Kaspiysk	Ali Aliyev Sports Complex	2011	6,000
Kazan	Kazan Basket-Hall	2003	8,000
Kazan	Kazan Volleyball Centre	2010	5,000
Kazan	TatNeft Arena	2005	10,400
Khabarovsk	Platinum Arena	2003	7,100
Khabarovsk	Arena Yerofey	2013	10,000
Khanty-Mansiysk	Ugra Arena	2008	5,500
Khimki	Khimki Basketball Center	1970	5,025
Kolomna	Kolomna Ice Rink	2006	6,150
Krasnodar	Krasnodar Basket-Hall	2011	7,500
Krasnoyarsk	Sever Arena	2011	4,100
Krasnoyarsk	Yarygin Sports Palace	1981	5,000
Krasnoyarsk	Platinum Arena Krasnoyarsk	2018	7,000
Lyubertsy	Triumph Sports Palace		4,000
Magnitogorsk	Metallurg Arena	2007	7,800
Moscow	CSKA Arena	2015	14,000
Moscow	CSKA Ice Palace	1964	5,600
Moscow	Dynamo Sports Hall	1980	5,000
Moscow	Krylatskoye Sports Palace	2006	5,000
Moscow	Luzhniki Small Sports Arena	1956	8,700
Moscow	Megasport Arena	2006	13,926
Moscow	Sokolniki Arena	1956	5,000
Moscow	Universal Sports Palace	1980	5,670
Moscow	VTB Arena	2019	12,273
Mytishchi	Mytishchi Arena	2005	9,000
Nizhnekamsk	Neftekhimik Ice Palace	2005	5,500
Nizhny Novgorod	Volga Arena	2026	12,350
Nizhny Novgorod	Konovalenko Sports Palace	1967	4,300
Nizhny Novgorod	Trade Union Sports Palace	1965	5,600
Novokuznetsk	Metallurgists Sports Palace	1984	6,818
Novosibirsk	Ice Sports Palace Sibir	1964	7,400
Novosibirsk	Sibir Arena	2023	12,000
Odintsovo	Live Arena	2022	11,000
Omsk	Blinov Sports and Concerts Complex	1986	5,500
Omsk	G Drive Arena	2022	12,000
Penza	Dizel Arena	2011	5,500
Perm	Universal Sports Palace Molot	1966	7,000
Podolsk	Vityaz Ice Palace	2000	5,500
Rostov	Rostov Palace of Sports	1967	4,000
Saint Petersburg	SKA Arena	2023	22,500
Saint Petersburg	Ice Palace	2000	12,300
Saint Petersburg	Sibur Arena	2013	7,120
Saint Petersburg	Yubileyny Sports Palace	1967	7,044
Saransk	Ogarev Arena	2021	7,800
Saratov	Kristall Ice Sports Palace	1969	6,100
Sochi	Adler Arena	2012	8,000
Sochi	Bolshoy Ice Dome	2012	12,000
Sochi	Iceberg Skating Palace	2012	12,000
Sochi	Shayba Arena	2013	7,000
Tolyatti	Lada Arena	2013	6,600
Ufa	Ice Palace Salavat Yulaev	1967	4,043
Ufa	Ufa Arena	2007	8,250
Vladivostok	Fetisov Arena	2013	7,000
Yaroslavl	Arena 2000	2001	9,070
Yaroslavl	Multifunctional Volleyball Center	2026	6,000
Yekaterinburg	UMMC Arena	2025	12,588
Yekaterinburg	Yekaterinburg Sports Palace	1970	5,500

== Historic arenas ==
Arenas	Capacity	City	Duration
Arena Omsk	10,318	Omsk	2004–2019
SCC Peterburgsky	20,000	Saint Petersburg	1980–2020
Olympiskii	35,000	Moscow	1980-2020
Luzhniki Palace of Sports	11,500	Moscow	1956–2023
CSKA Universal Sports Hall	5,500	Moscow	1979–2021

== Under construction ==
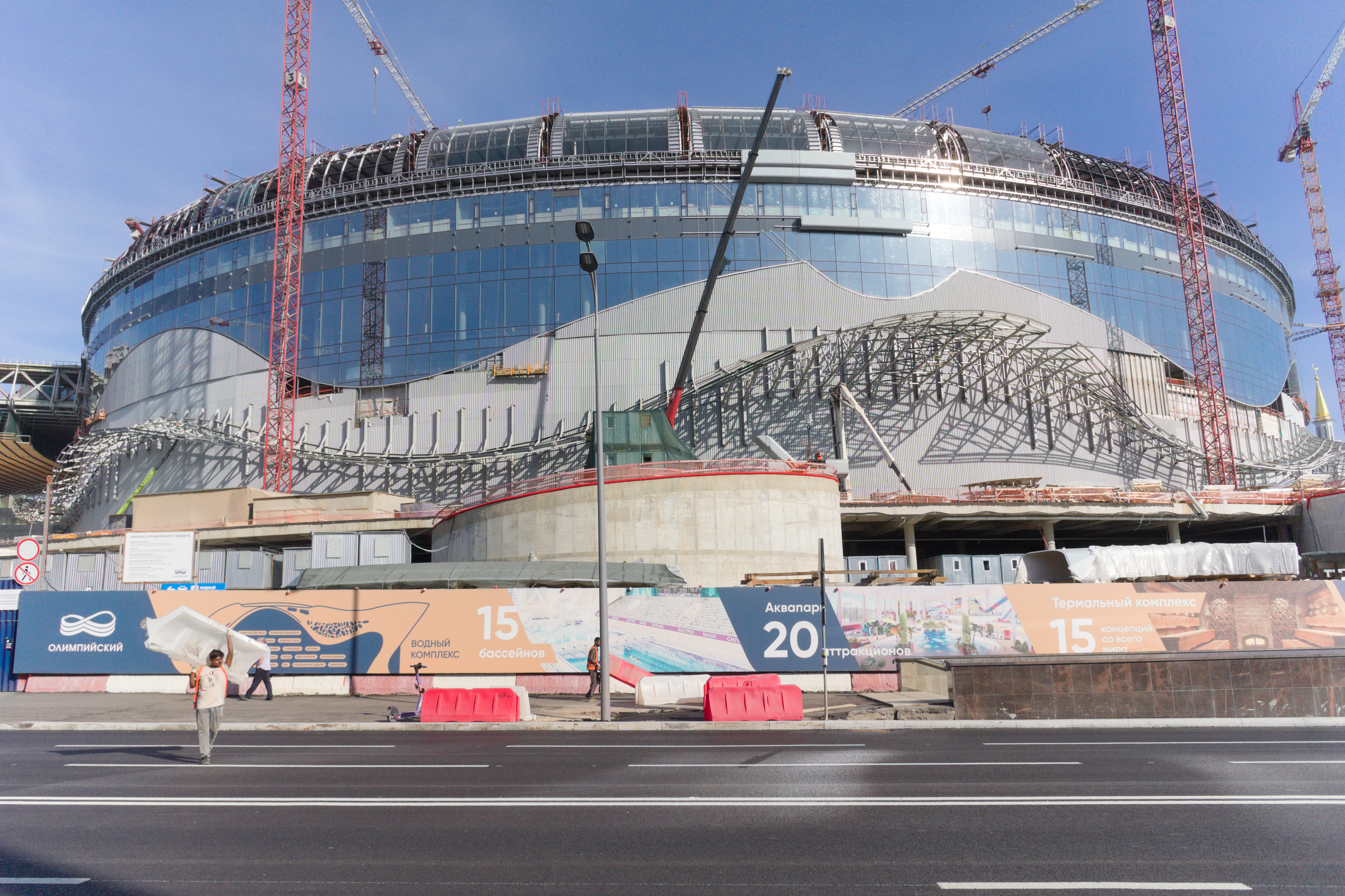
New Olimpiisky Arena in September 2025

Arenas	Capacity	City	Planned opening year
New CSKA Ice Palace	14,000	Moscow	2028
New Olimpiisky Arena	12,000	Moscow	2027
Luzhniki Palace of Sports	12,000	Moscow	2028
Perm Ice Palace	10,000	Perm	2027
RMK Arena	5,000	Chelyabinsk	2026
CSKA Basketball Center	5,129	Moscow	??
Gazprom Arena	5,500	Yuzhno-Sakhalinsk	2027
Rostov-on-Don Palace of Sports	5,000	Rostov-on-Don	2025

== See also ==
- List of football stadiums in Russia
- List of indoor arenas by capacity
- Lists of stadiums
