= Ageyenko =

Ageyenko (Russian: Аге́енко) is a Russian last name, a variant of Ageyev.

People with the last name

- Egor Ageenko (Yegor Ageyenko), Belarusian ice hockey player for HC Shakhtyor Soligorsk
- Mikhail Ageenko (Mikhail Ageyenko), Russian canoeist participating in the 2004 Canoe Slalom World Cup Race 1 – Men's K-1
