= Ogarev Arena =

Sports venue in Saransk, Russia

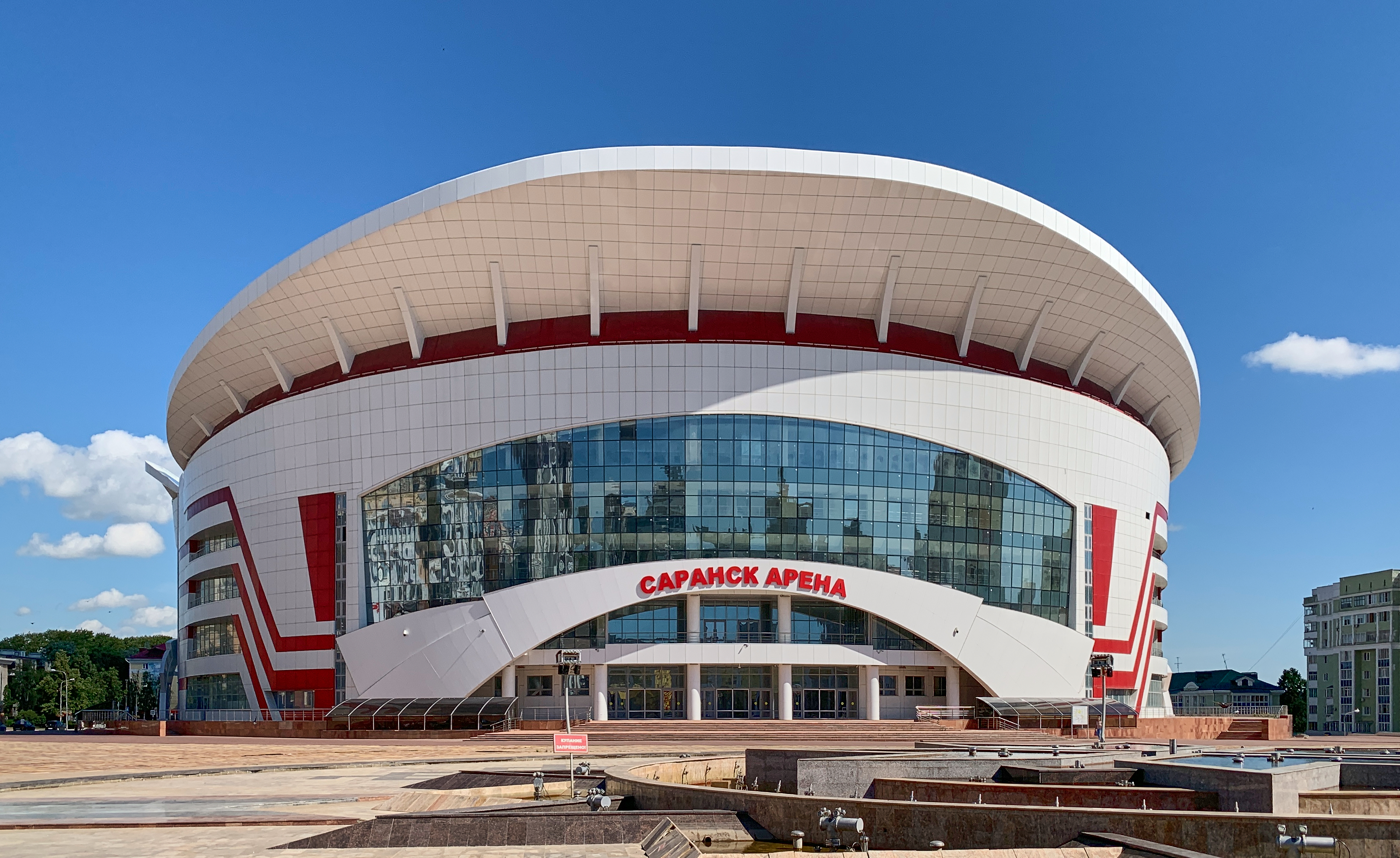
- Interactive map of Ogarev Arena
- Former names: Saransk Arena
- Address: Bogdana Khmelnitskogo 35a Saransk, Mordovia, Russia
- Coordinates: 54°11′17″N 45°11′0″E
- Elevation: (Floor count; 4)
- Owner: Mordovian State University
- Capacity: Ice Hockey: 7 500; Basketball: 8 106; Concert : 5 500
- Field size: 60 m × 31 m (197 ft × 102 ft) (ice rink)
- Acreage: 49,985 square metres (4.9985 ha; 12.352 acres)

Construction
- Groundbreaking: 2010
- Built: 2010 – 2021
- Opened: 21 December 2021; 4 years ago
- Cost: ₽ 5,5 billion (€ 63,2 million in 2021)
- Architects: LLC Design and Construction Workshop
- Project managers: Institute of Sports Facilities; JSC Scientific Research Center Construction
- Main contractor: GC StroyEnergoKomplekt

Website
- vk.com/ogarev__arena

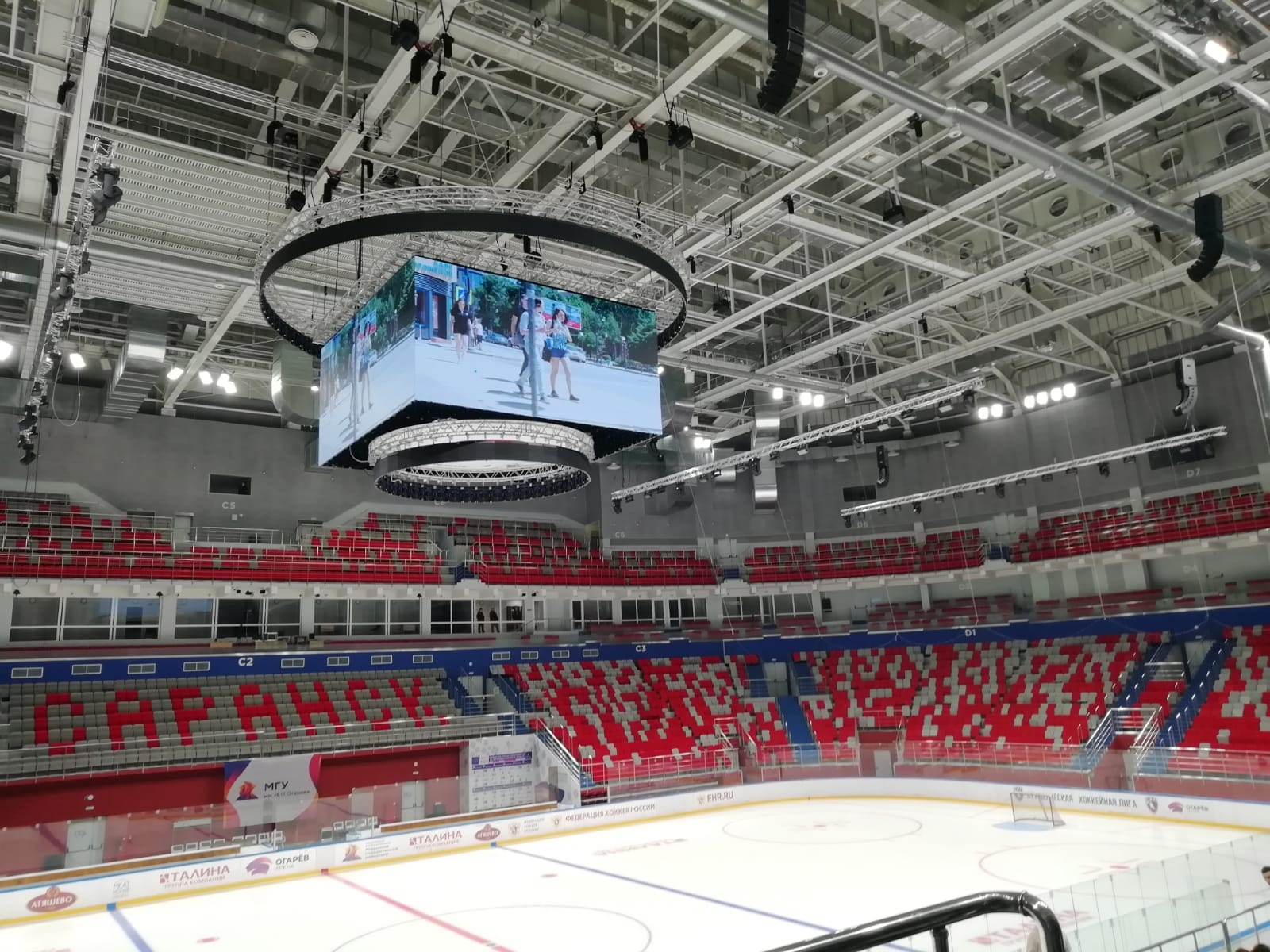
Interior

The Ogarev Arena (Russian: Огарёв Арена) is a multifunctional sports venue in Saransk, the capital of the Republic of Mordovia, Russian Federation. Constructed in 2021, it consists of two tiers and can accommodate up to 7,500 spectators. It is primarily equipped for hockey and ice skating, and includes gyms and choreographic halls.

Initially named Saransk Arena (Russian: Саранск Арена), it was laid down in 2011 but was only completed a decade later, and was opened on 25 December 2021. On 1 November 2022, the venue was transferred to N.P. Ogarev Mordovia State University and became federal property. Following a public vote on social media on 3 April 2023, the arena was renamed to "Ogarev Arena".

The 2024 Russian Junior Figure Skating Championships was held in the venue.

== Gallery ==
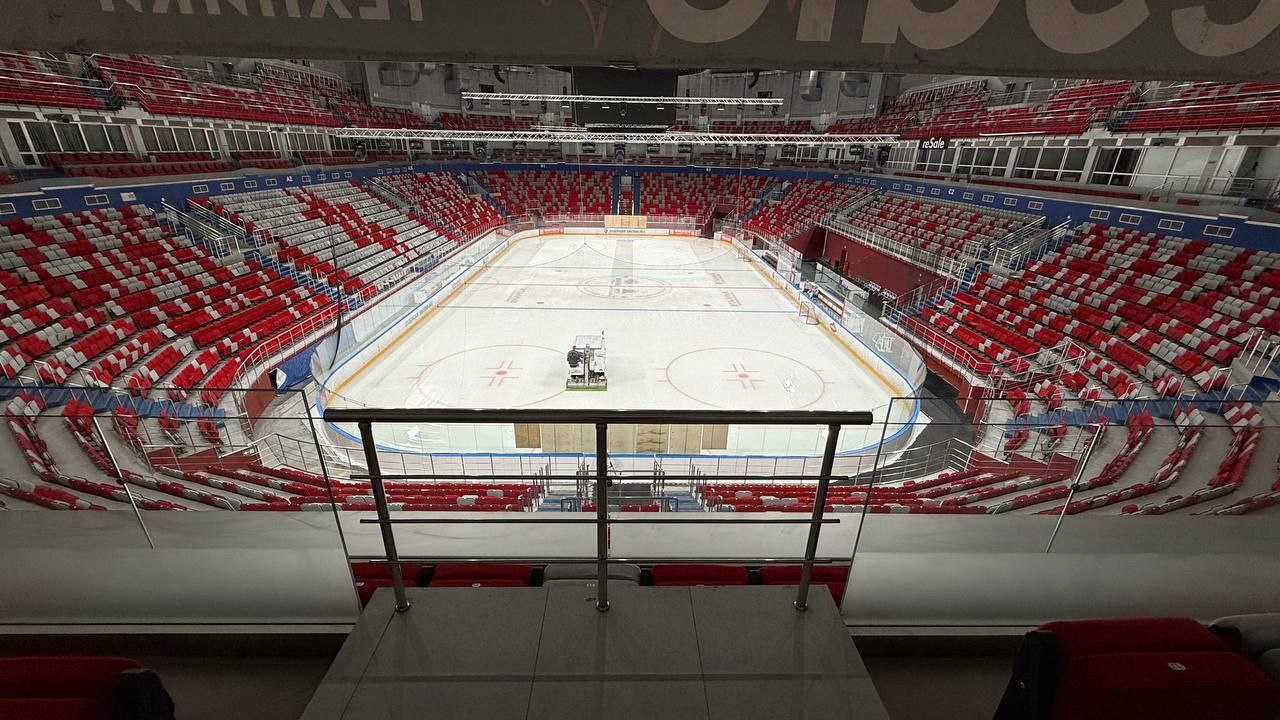
26.07.25

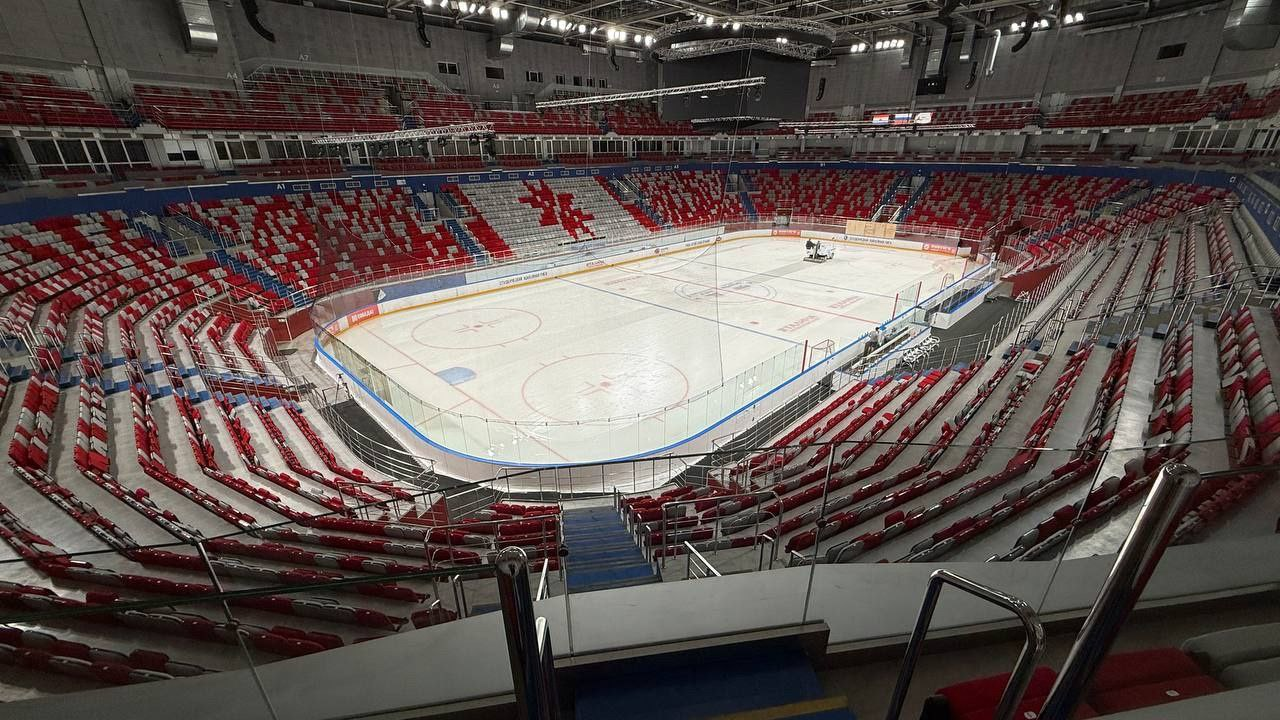
26.07.25

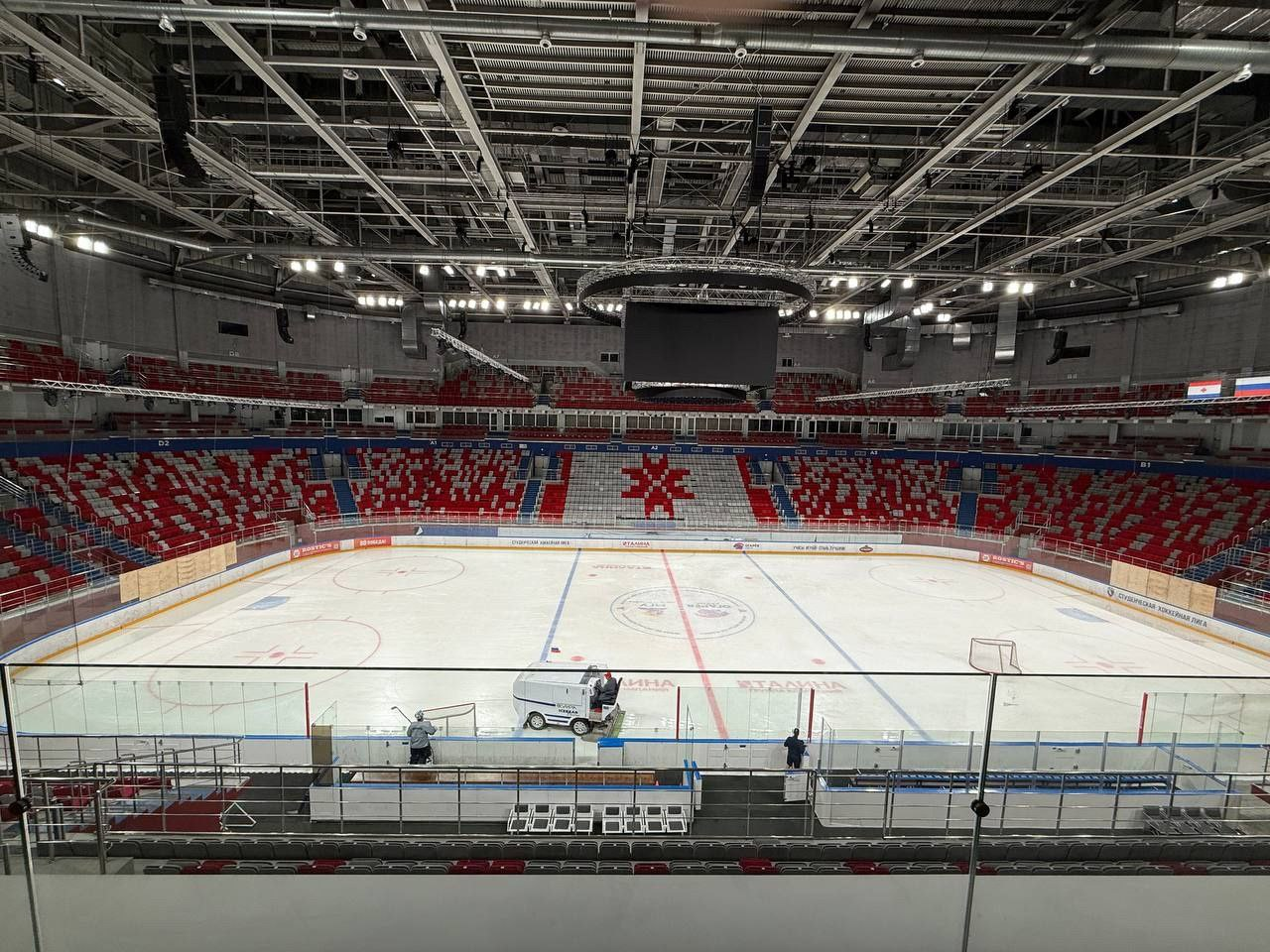
26.07.25

== See also ==
- Mordovia Arena, a football stadium in Saransk
- List of indoor arenas in Russia
