= Ageyevo =

Ageyevo (Russian: Агеево) is the name of several inhabited localities in Russia.

Urban localities

- Ageyevo, Tula Oblast, a work settlement in Suvorovsky District of Tula Oblast

Rural localities

- Ageyevo, Sanchursky District, Kirov Oblast, a village in Shishovsky Rural Okrug of Sanchursky District in Kirov Oblast; 56°50′N 47°15′E
- Ageyevo, Slobodskoy District, Kirov Oblast, a village in Ozernitsky Rural Okrug of Slobodskoy District in Kirov Oblast; 59°10′N 49°55′E
- Ageyevo, Republic of Mordovia, a village in Akselsky Selsoviet of Temnikovsky District in the Republic of Mordovia; 54°37′N 43°28′E
- Ageyevo, Perm Krai, a village in Vereshchaginsky District of Perm Krai
- Ageyevo, Tver Oblast, a village in Shchucheyskoye Rural Settlement of Zharkovsky District in Tver Oblast
- Ageyevo, Belozersky District, Vologda Oblast, a village in Gulinsky Selsoviet of Belozersky District in Vologda Oblast
- Ageyevo, Velikoustyugsky District, Vologda Oblast, a village in Viktorovsky Selsoviet of Velikoustyugsky District in Vologda Oblast
- Ageyevo, Yaroslavl Oblast, a village in Levashovsky Rural Okrug of Nekrasovsky District in Yaroslavl Oblast
