= Kuznetsk Metallurgists Sports Palace =

Indoor sporting arena in Novokuznetsk, Russia

Coordinates: 53°46′4″N 87°6′56″E

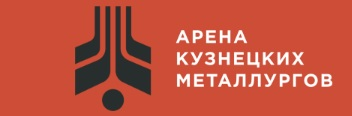

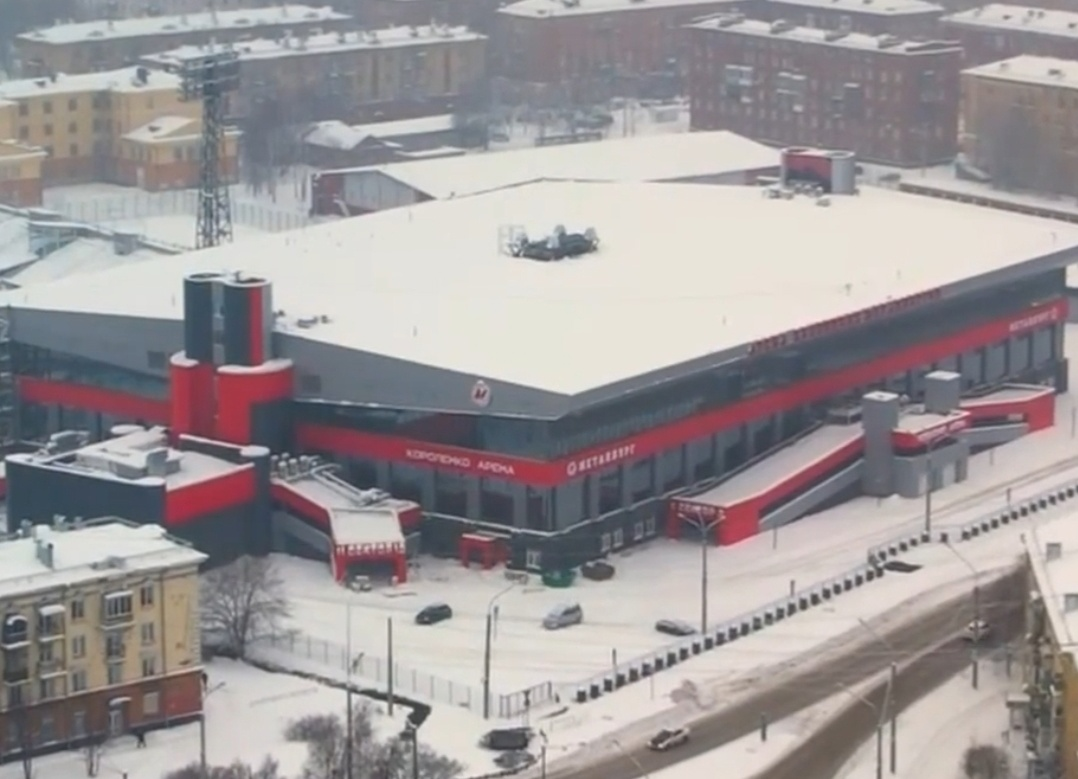
- Interactive map of Kuznetsk Metallurgists Sports Palace
- Address: 24 Stroiteley Avenue; Novokuznetsk 654005; Russia
- Location: The central district
- Elevation: Floor count: 3
- Owner: Novokuznetsk City District of Kemerovo Region — Kuzbass municipality
- Seating type: 6 818 (2023–present); 8 300 (1985)
- Type: Ice Palace
- Field size: 60 × 28 m
- Field shape: rectangle with rounded corners
- Acreage: 25 thousand sq.m
- Parking: ground

Construction
- Built: 1976–1984
- Opened: 1 October 1984; 42 years ago; 8 February 2023
- Renovated: 1999; 2008; 2013; 11 July 2018-31 August 2018; February 2020-21 January 2023
- Closed: 13 April 2020-7 February 2023
- Cost: Built (1976-1984): Renovation (2020-2023): ₽ 2 583 million (€ 27,8 million in 2023)
- Architects: 1976-1984: Kemerovo Civil Engineering Design Institute: Y.Zhuravkov; R. Valiakhmetov; A. Vaganov
- General contractors: Kuznetsk Metallurgical Plant; Renovation (2020-2023): Arena LLC (2020-2022); Altair-NK LLC (2022-2023)
- Main contractors: Komsomol; Uraldomnaremont Trust; Novokuznetsk Construction Trust; Vostokgidrospetsstroy; Zemzheldorstroy; Sibstalconstruction-1; Renovation (2020-2023): Nevatom LLC The Light City Company

Tenants
- Metallurg Novokuznetsk (VHL) (1984–2020, 2024-present); Kuznetsk Bears (MHL) (2009-2020, 2024–present)

Website
- Venue Website

Kuznetsk Metallurgists Sports Palace (Russian: Арена кузнецких металлургов им. Олега Короленко) is an indoor sporting arena located in Novokuznetsk, Russia. The arena has a seating capacity of 6,818 and serves as the home venue for the Metallurg Novokuznetsk ice hockey team. Its construction was funded through the efforts of city organizations, volunteer clean-up days, and significant technological renovations.

== History ==
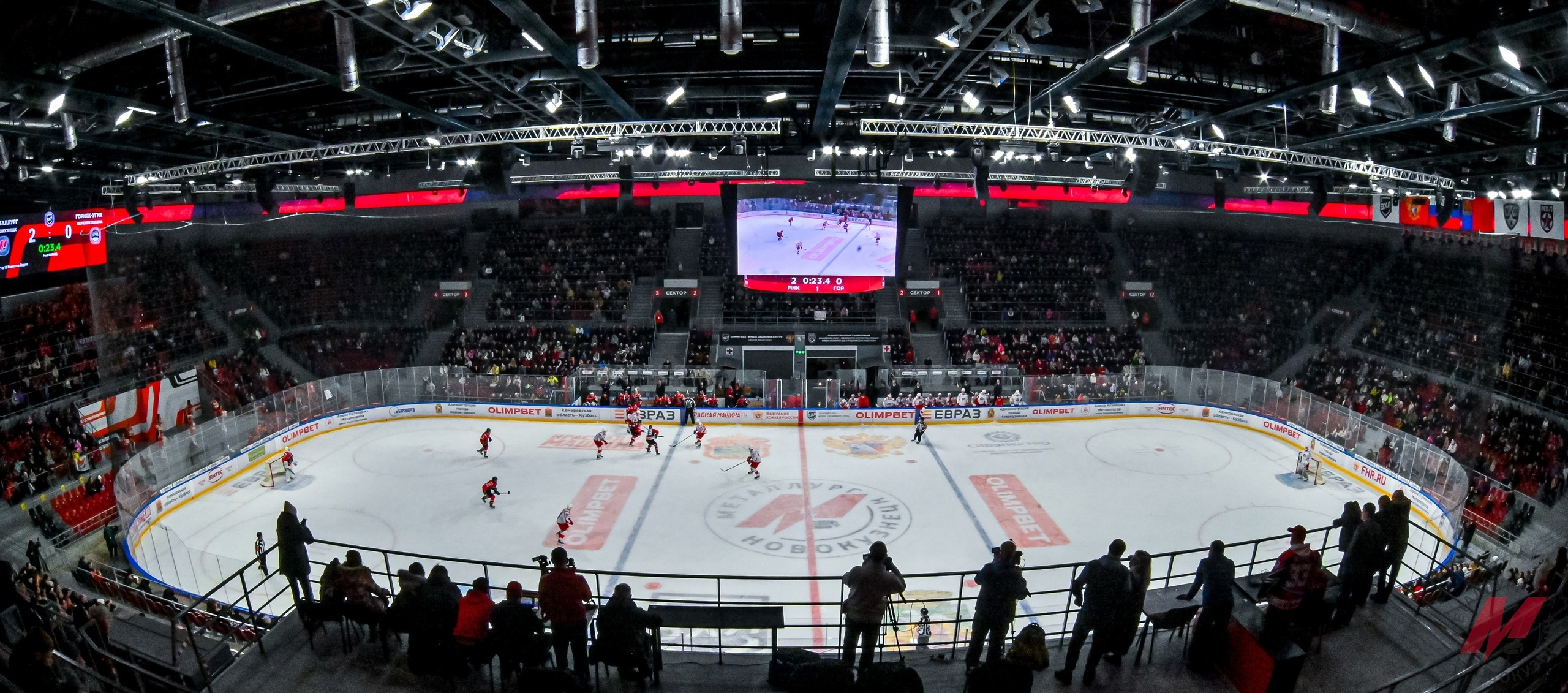
Арена Кузнецких Металлургов 20-01-2024

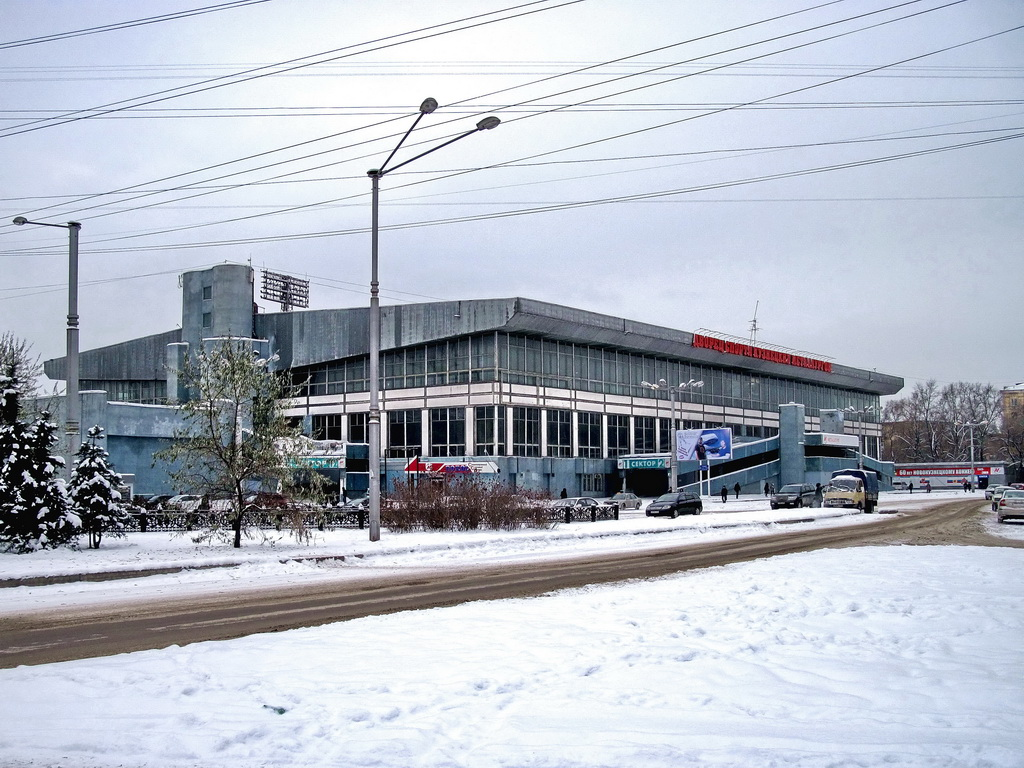
Дворец спорта кузнецких металлургов

The first ice rink in Stalinsk was built in 1933, opposite the Kommunar Cinema. In December 1937, a permanent oval skating rink was established on the site where the Sports Palace now stands. This facility included a hockey arena and running tracks.

In 1957, plans were made to construct the largest stadium in Siberia, covering an area of 17 hectares, in the city. The proposed site for this stadium was the area now occupied by Gagarin Park. A design for the Sports Palace was developed and published in a local newspaper, but the project was never realized. However, the need for a hockey stadium remained a priority for the townspeople in the mid-1960s, as the existing hockey rink did not meet capacity and performance requirements.

In 1964, the Kemerovo Construction Institute proposed expanding the capacity of the hockey rink at the Metallurg Stadium. The expansion project was divided into three stages: the first stage was completed by the beginning of the 1965 sports season, the second stage by the summer of 1966, and the final stage planned for the future. This initiative led to the closure of the existing stadium to install seating in the stands, transforming the venue into a multi-purpose facility capable of hosting various sporting events.

As part of these developments, an outdoor ice rink was constructed in the mid-1960s. In 1967, the facility underwent its first major reconstruction, during which a concrete base was installed on the playing surface, enabling the use of artificial ice. The Metallurg Hockey Arena became one of the first in the country to adopt this technology.

At that time, the stadium did not have seating and remained in this configuration until 1976, when construction began on an indoor arena. The project for the new facility was developed by Kuzbassgrazhdanproekt, with contributions from Novokuznetsk architects. They reviewed designs for similar structures in Moscow, Kiev, and Novosibirsk, adapting the plans to suit the unique characteristics of Novokuznetsk, including its proximity to existing buildings, roads, and utilities.

Between 1964 and 1966, during the construction of the outdoor arena, essential engineering tasks such as laying the foundation, building structural supports, and installing plumbing systems were completed. The entire city actively participated in the development of this new sports facility. Representatives from the Komsomol city committee were present at the construction site daily, coordinating efforts with volunteers from all districts of Novokuznetsk.

Each organization in the city viewed it as their responsibility to contribute to the project. Remarkably, not a single ruble from the city or federal budgets was spent on the construction. Instead, the project was funded entirely through the initiatives of local organizations, volunteer labor, and capital repairs.

Nikolai Spiridonovich Ermakov, the first secretary of the Novokuznetsk City Party Committee, served as both the inspiration and the driving force behind the construction of the sports venue. His leadership, determination, and personal involvement were instrumental in turning this unplanned project into a reality.

The primary efforts in constructing the palace were led by the Kuznetsk Metallurgical Plant, under the direction of Alexei Kuznetsov. He, along with his colleagues Evgeny Braunstein, Gennady Yarmolinsky, and Anatoly Mukhachev, played an active role in the construction process. Notably, the design of the facility was developed simultaneously with the reconstruction efforts.

During the renovation of the ice rink, several challenges emerged, particularly the need to replace outdated cooling pipes. For the first time in a sports facility in the Krasnoyarsk region, polyethylene pipes were introduced, and the Novokuznetsk rink adopted this innovative solution as well. The removal of the old pipes was especially difficult, as it required the use of controlled explosives.

At the time, an All-Union conference of Transvzryvprom representatives was held in the city, bringing together the top explosives experts, who proposed a unique plan to carry out a series of controlled explosions in a newly constructed building in the city center. To minimize the impact of these explosions, a metal platform was recommended. Ultimately, 256 controlled explosions were conducted.

The welding of polyethylene pipes was managed by the Lysenko team from the first assembly department of the Siberian Metallurgy and Construction Trust. The pipes were joined into lengths of 31 meters, with a total of 360 such sections required. The sides of the hockey arena were built by employees of the KMK workshop responsible for the repair and manufacture of construction parts.

Work on framing the tribune areas, installing barriers, and constructing platforms was carried out by a team led by N. F. Maslov from the Novokuznetsk SSMU-Uraldomnaremont trust. Workers from the first department of the Novokuznetsk Construction Trust installed stained-glass windows to maintain a stable temperature. Employees of Santehproekt, considering the impact of ice and other environmental factors, were tasked with designing an air conditioning system to ensure optimal indoor conditions.

The cooling system, storm drains, and sewerage were built by Vostokgidrospetsstroy and Zemzheldorstroy, with installation work handled by teams from Sibstalconstruction-1. The project was an ambitious undertaking, featuring contributions from Hungarian specialists who installed an electronic scoreboard to provide accurate and timely information for spectators.

The facility also included several amenities: comfortable buffet areas and spectator halls, dining facilities, offices for medical personnel, training rooms, a children's and youth sports school, a TV broadcasting room, cozy locker rooms, a steam room for athletes, and a recovery center.

The lighting system of the Sports Palace was specifically designed to support color television broadcasts.

Roman Ilyich Atlasov was the first director of the Sports Palace and named the building "Kuznetsk Metallurgical Sports Palace." The opening ceremony took place on October 1, 1984, coinciding with Metallurg's 25th anniversary in the national league. Novokuznetsk's team played their first game in the newly constructed palace against Metallurg Cherepovets, ending in a 4-4 draw.

In 1985, seating was installed in the arena. The seats were made of polypropylene, a fire-resistant material, which was challenging to procure as its production was restricted to a closed facility. Leaders from the Kemerovo and Tomsk regions negotiated the supply of polypropylene, which was then sent to a plant in Orekhovo-Zuyevo. For the first time in the country, 8,300 seats were manufactured using advanced technology. This concept of using polypropylene seats was later adopted by numerous sports facilities across the country, with the first sets delivered to the Novokuznetsk Sports Arena.

Over time, the equipment and infrastructure of the Sports Palace became outdated both physically and technologically. Following the 1998-1999 season, the management group "Mikom" initiated a comprehensive reconstruction of the facility, which was carried out in several stages. The stands and utility rooms were refurbished, and modern equipment was installed. After the reconstruction, Boris Aleksandrovich Kovrigin was appointed as the head of the facility.

In November 2001, a museum dedicated to the history of hockey in Novokuznetsk was opened at the Kuznetsk Metallurgical Sports Palace. The initiative to create the museum was led by Alexander Gorbunov, the head of the cultural and entertainment department of the "Metallurg" hockey club. The museum's inauguration was attended by the mayor of the city, Sergey Dmitriyevich Martin.

In 2008, another reconstruction of the palace was initiated. During this process, the old refrigeration equipment was replaced with new units manufactured in Italy and Norway.

In 2018, the facade of the Sports Palace was renovated, funded by EVRAZ ZSMK, to mark the 400th anniversary of the city. The Kuznetsk Metallurgical Workers' Sports Palace has long been an important symbol of Novokuznetsk. Throughout its history, numerous events held at the palace have left a lasting impression on residents, including hundreds of concerts by popular artists, the Congress of Composers of the Soviet Union, and performances by the country’s best figure skaters. It is no surprise that Novokuznetsk was chosen to host the first-ever All-Star Game in Russian hockey history.

== See also ==
- List of indoor arenas in Russia
- List of Kontinental Hockey League arenas
