= Agapius of Galatista =

Saint and Martyr Agapius of Galatista (Greek: Άγιος Ιερομάρτυς Αγάπιος ο εκ Γαλατίστης) was born in Galatista, a town in Chalkidiki, Macedonia (Greece), in 1710. At that time, Galatista was a Bishopry and had many schools providing formidable education. The same town was the birthplace of the hagiographers Galatsanoi, who painted many icons and murals in the Mount Athos Vatopedi monastery.

Agapius, when still young, travelled to Jerusalem, where he became first a monk and later a priest by Patriarch Parthenius (1737–1766). He returned to Thessaloniki, where he served as a priest. In 1743, he was sent to Moscow to collect charities and financial assistance to the Patriarchate of Jerusalem and remained there till 1747.

He returned to Thessaloniki, where he taught at the Athos Academy and other schools. On 18 August 1752, Agapius was tortured and murdered by Janissaries on his way from Galatista to Thessaloniki.

It is not known where he was buried. He was honored as a saint for the first time in 1997 and since then his memory is observed on 18 August.
