= Cheboksary Arena =

Arena in Cheboksary, Russia

Coordinates: 56.1251°N 47.2652°E

- Interactive map of Cheboksary Arena
- Full name: Ice Palace "Cheboksary Arena"; ЛД «Чебоксары-Арена»
- Address: Cheboksary; Russia
- Capacity: 7,500

Construction
- Opened: 2015

Tenant
- HK Cheboksary (2016-present)

Cheboksary Arena (Russian: Чебоксары-Арена), also called the ice palace, is a sports complex in Cheboksary, Chuvashia, Russia. The arena has a maximum capacity of 7,600 people.

== Functions ==
The arena complies with the requirements of the Kontinental Hockey League. Facilities include a training rink, a gym, a conference room, a café, and underground parking. Concerts and sporting events are also held at the arena.

The arena opened on 3 June 2015.

Since 2016, it has served as the home arena for HK Cheboksary.
