= Agapius of Spain =

Agapius of Spain was a Christian martyr and most likely a bishop who died under the persecutions of the emperor Valerian in AD 259. According to tradition, he was a Spaniard, who along with some others was exiled by the Roman government to Africa. He was martyred along with several others at Cirta in 259.

His feast day is observed on April 29.
