= Agapa =

Agapa (Russian: Ага́па) is an Old Church Slavonic and rare Russian female first name. It is derived from the Greek word agapē, meaning love.

The diminutives of "Agapa" are Aga (А́га) and Gapa (Га́па).

"Agapa" may also be a diminutive of the female name Agapiya.
