= Ilya Dervuk =

Russian ice hockey player

- Born: July 9, 1996 (age 29) Omsk, Russia
- Height: 6 ft 0 in (183 cm)
- Weight: 185 lb (84 kg; 13 st 3 lb)
- Position: Defence
- Shoots: Left
- KHL team Former teams: Amur Khabarovsk; Avangard Omsk; HC Dynamo Pardubice
- Playing career: 2013–present

Ilya Dervuk (Илья Дервук; born July 9, 1996) is a Russian professional ice hockey defenceman. He is currently playing with Amur Khabarovsk of the Kontinental Hockey League (KHL).

== Playing career ==
Dervuk made his Kontinental Hockey League (KHL) debut playing with Avangard Omsk during the 2013–14 KHL season.

After five seasons in the KHL, Dervuk starting the 2018–19 with HC Yugra in the Supreme Hockey League (VHL), opted to move abroad in signing a try-out contract with Czech outfit, HC Dynamo Pardubice of the Czech Extraliga (ELH), on October 23, 2018.
