= Sergei Ageyev (ice hockey) =

Russian ice hockey goaltender

- Born: June 5, 1984 (age 41) Penza, Russia
- Height: 6 ft 3 in (191 cm)
- Weight: 203 lb (92 kg; 14 st 7 lb)
- Position: Goaltender
- Shoots: Left
- VHL team Former teams: HC Izhstal; HC Astana (Kazakhstan)
- Playing career: 2009–present

Sergei Ageyev (born June 5, 1984) is a Russian ice hockey goaltender. He is currently playing with HC Astana of the Russian Higher Hockey League.

During the 2011-12 season, he played three playoff games with HC Izhstal of the Kazakhstan Hockey Championship, the top level of ice hockey in Kazakhstan.
