= Bars Kazan =

- City: Kazan, Russia
- League: VHL
- Conference: 1
- Division: B
- Founded: 2009
- Home arena: Kazan Sports Palace
- Colors: Green, White, Red, Silver
- Owner(s): Tatneft
- General manager: Rafik Yakubov
- Head coach: Sergey Dushkin
- Affiliates: Ak Bars Kazan (KHL); Irbis Kazan (MHL)
- Website: Official Page

Franchise history
- 2009–: Bars Kazan

Bars Kazan (Russian: Хоккейный клуб «Барс») is a Russian professional ice hockey team from Kazan, who compete in the Supreme Hockey League (VHL). The club is affiliated as a feeder club for the Ak Bars Kazan organization of the Kontinental Hockey League (KHL).

== History ==
The team was founded in 2009 by Ak Bars Kazan as a farm team and registered to play in the highest Junior Hockey League in Russia, the MHL. The team, also known as JHC Bars, achieved the best placement in the 2013–14 season when it finished the main round in first place and reached the semi-finals in the play-offs for the Kharlamov Cup.

In the summer of 2014, the management of AK Bars re-structured their affiliate team, so that Bars Kazan was promoted to the second-tier professional level in the Supreme Hockey League (VHL). Fellow affiliate team, Irbis Kazan, was then to be elevated from the MHLB to take their place the MHL.

In the 2014–15 season, Bars Kazan finished in last place in the league and thus missed the play-offs.
