= Agafonovo, Vyaznikovsky District, Vladimir Oblast =

Agafonovo Агафоново
- Village
- Location within Vladimir Oblast Location within Russia
- Coordinates: 56°10′N 41°54′E
- Country: Russia
- Region: Vladimir Oblast
- District: Vyaznikovsky District
- Time zone: UTC+3:00

Agafonovo (Russian: Агафоново) is a rural locality (a village) in Oktyabrskoye Rural Settlement, Vyaznikovsky District, Vladimir Oblast, Russia. The population was 3 as of 2010.

== Geography ==
Agafonovo is located 20 km southwest of Vyazniki (the district's administrative centre) by road. Zhartsy is the nearest rural locality.
