= Gasha, Republic of Dagestan =

Gasha Гаша
- Selo
- Location within Republic of Dagestan Location within Russia
- Coordinates: 42°20′N 47°49′E
- Country: Russia
- Region: Republic of Dagestan
- District: Kayakentsky District
- Time zone: UTC+3:00

Gasha (Russian: Гаша; Kumyk: Гаша, Gaşa) is a rural locality (a selo) in Alkhadzhakentsky Selsoviet, Kayakentsky District, Republic of Dagestan, Russia. The population was 54 as of 2010.

== Geography ==
Gasha is located 27 km southwest of Novokayakent (the district's administrative centre) by road. Alkhadzhakent and Mamaaul are the nearest rural localities.

== Nationalities ==
Kumyks live there.
