= Agapius of Alexandria =

Byzantine physician

Agapius (Ancient Greek: Ἀγάπιος) was an ancient physician of Alexandria, who taught and practiced medicine at Byzantium with great success and reputation, and acquired immense riches. Of his date it can only be determined, that he must have lived before the end of the fifth century AD, as Damascius (from whom Photius, Bibliotheca cod. 242, and the Suda have taken their account of him) lived about that time.
