= Kuznetskie Medvedi =

Kuznetskie Medvedi Kuznetsk Bears
- City: Novokuznetsk, Russia
- League: Minor Hockey League
- Conference: Eastern
- Division: Ural-Siberia
- Founded: 2009
- Home arena: Kuznetsk Metallurgists Sports Palace
- Colors
- Affiliate: Metallurg Novokuznetsk (VHL)
- Website: Official Page

Franchise history
- 2009–present: Kuznetskie Medvedi

The Kuznetskie Medvedi (Russian: Кузнецкие Медведи; English: Kuznetsk Bears) is a junior ice hockey team from Novokuznetsk, which contains players from the Metallurg Novokuznetsk school. They are members of the Minor Hockey League (MHL), the top tier of junior hockey in the country.

== Season-by-season record ==
Note: GP = Games played, W = Wins, L = Losses, T = Ties, OTW = Overtime/shootout wins, OTL = Overtime/shootout losses, Pts = Points, GF = Goals for, GA = Goals against

Season	GP	W	L	OTW	OTL	Pts	GF	GA	Finish	Playoffs
2009–10	54	17	32	3	2	59	175	194	8th, Eastern	Lost in Finals, 1–3 (Stalnye Lisy)
2010–11	53	15	32	3	3	54	142	174	11th, Eastern	Did not qualify
2011–12	60	28	15	11	6	112	218	164	5th, Eastern	Lost in Conference Semifinals, 0–4 (Omskie Yastreby)
2012–13	60	28	21	8	3	98	186	165	8th, Eastern	Lost in Conference Quarterfinals, 0–3 (Omskie Yastreby)

== Head coaches ==
- (Russia) Sergei Krasilnikov 2009-11
- (Russia) Alexander Kitov 2011-present
