= Agafonovo, Sokolsky District, Vologda Oblast =

Agafonovo Агафоново
- Village
- Location within Vologda Oblast Location within Russia
- Coordinates: 59°38′N 41°03′E
- Country: Russia
- Region: Vologda Oblast
- District: Sokolsky District
- Time zone: UTC+3:00

Agafonovo (Russian: Агафоново) is a rural locality (a village) in Chuchkovskoye Rural Settlement, Sokolsky District, Vologda Oblast, Russia. The population was 3 as of 2002.

== Geography ==
Agafonovo is located 75 km northeast of Sokol (the district's administrative centre) by road. Boyarskoye is the nearest rural locality.
