= Lukáš Vopelka =

Czech ice hockey player

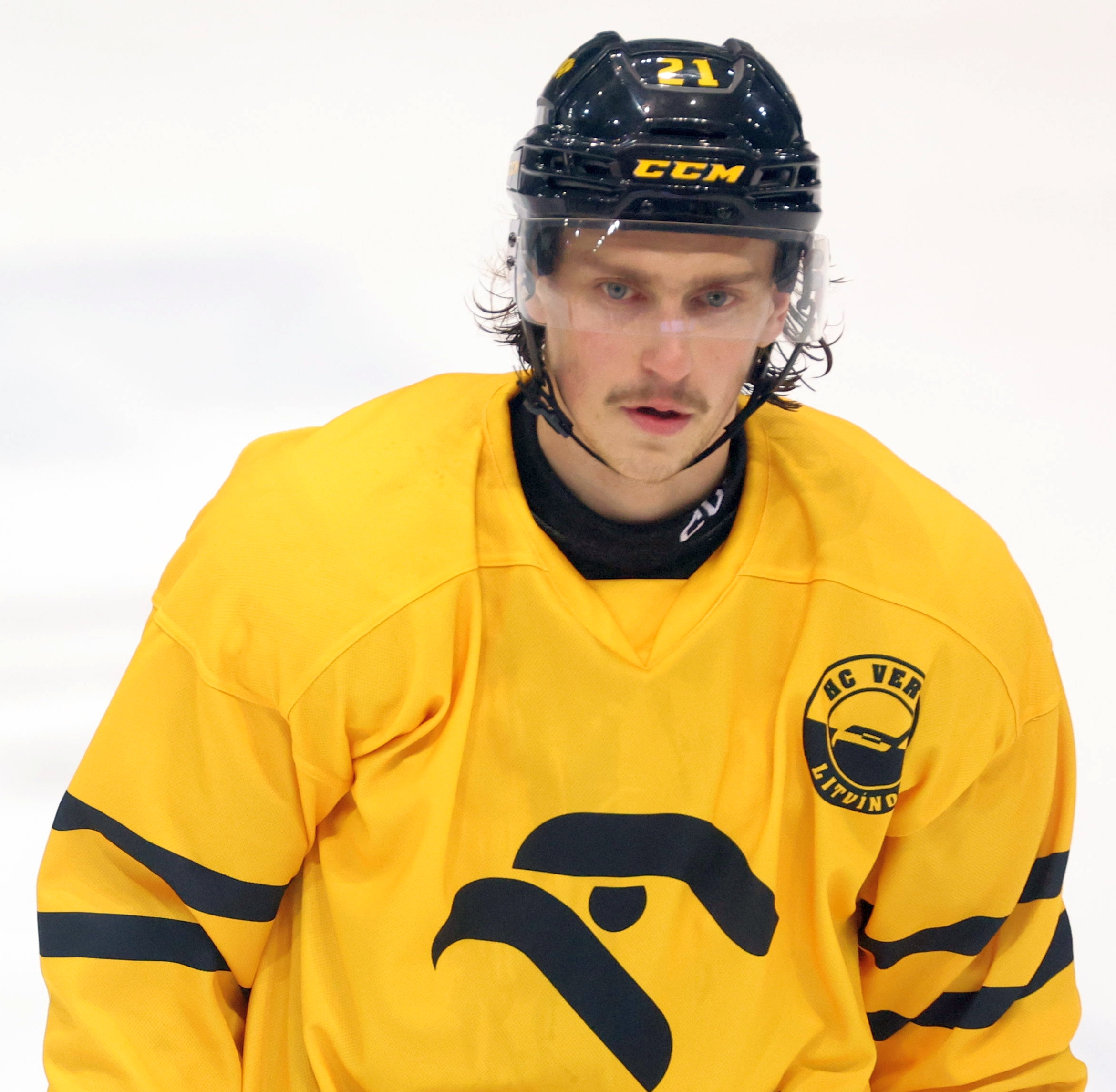
- Vopelka in 2024
- Born: March 2, 1996 (age 30) České Budějovice, Czech Republic
- Height: 6 ft 0 in (183 cm)
- Weight: 181 lb (82 kg; 12 st 13 lb)
- Position: Forward
- Shoots: Right
- team Former teams: Free agent Örebro HK; HC Vita Hästen; HC Slovan Bratislava; HK Dukla Trenčín; Mountfield HK; HC Vítkovice Ridera; Orli Znojmo; HC Košice
- Playing career: 2013–present

Lukáš Vopelka (born March 2, 1996) is a Czech professional ice hockey player. He is currently a free agent having last played for HC Košice in the Slovak Extraliga.

Vopelka made his Swedish Hockey League regular season debut playing with Örebro HK during the 2013–14 SHL season.

== Career statistics ==
=== Regular season and playoffs ===
			Regular season					Playoffs
Season	Team	League	GP	G	A	Pts	PIM	GP	G	A	Pts	PIM

=== International ===
Year	Team	Event	Result	GP	G	A	Pts	PIM
