= Daniel Agina =

Kenyan footballer

Senior career*
Years	Team	Apps	(Gls)
- Tusker FC

International career
- Kenya national football team
- * Club domestic league appearances and goals

Daniel Agina (born in Nairobi) is a Kenyan football defender.

== Career ==
Agina went to Jamhuri High School in Nairobi. He played in the Kenyan Premier League for Tusker FC helping them claim 2 league championships and 2 East and Central African Championships.

He was also a key player when Kenya won the Castle Lager Cup in Dar es Salaam and also came second to Uganda in Nairobi.

He later moved to the US on soccer scholarship where he helped Southern Nazarene University go to 4 consecutive national tournaments. He graduated in 2007. He is the all-time leader in assists in the school's history. He was selected for the 2006 NAIA Men's Soccer All-American teams

== International career ==
He has played for the Kenya national football team.
