= Ageyevo, Perm Krai =

Ageyevo Агеево
- Village
- Location within Perm Krai Location within Russia
- Coordinates: 57°58′N 54°23′E
- Country: Russia
- Region: Perm Krai
- District: Vereshchaginsky District
- Time zone: UTC+5:00

Ageyevo (Russian: Агеево) is a rural locality (a village) in Vereshchaginsky District, Perm Krai, Russia. The population was 6 as of 2010.

== Geography ==
Ageyevo is located 26 km southwest of Vereshchagino, the district's administrative centre, by road. Borodulino is the nearest rural locality.
