= Russian Chamber Music Foundation of Seattle =

The Russian Chamber Music Foundation of Seattle (RCMFS) was founded in 2007 by pianist Dr. Natalya Ageyeva. The foundation has brought well known performers and groups to the Seattle music scene, including the Chamber Music Society of Lincoln Center, Erin Keefe, Arnaud Sussmann, Joshua Roman and Amos Yang. Since 2008, the foundation has hosted the Russian Piano Festival and Competition.

The organization specializes in the promotion of Russian music including solo and chamber music genres performed at Benaroya Hall in downtown Seattle. The artistic director, Natalya Ageyeva, studied at the Moscow Conservatory and University of Washington and has performed throughout the United States, Russia, and Europe.
