= Ivan Silayev (ice hockey) =

Russian ice hockey player

- Born: January 21, 1996 (age 30) Moscow, Russia
- Height: 5 ft 8 in (173 cm)
- Weight: 179 lb (81 kg; 12 st 11 lb)
- Position: Forward
- Shoots: Left
- Belarus team Former teams: HK Mogilev; CSKA Moscow; Admiral Vladivostok
- Playing career: 2014–present

Ivan Silayev (born January 21, 1996) is a Russian professional ice hockey player. He is currently playing with HK Mogilev in the Belarusian Extraliga.

On October 30, 2014, Silayev made his Kontinental Hockey League debut playing with HC CSKA Moscow during the 2014–15 KHL season.
