= Yegor Ogiyenko =

Russian ice hockey player

- Born: March 10, 1996 (age 29); Moscow, Russia
- Height: 5 ft 11 in (180 cm)
- Weight: 185 lb (84 kg; 13 st 3 lb)
- Position: Defence
- Shoots: Right
- VHL team Former teams: CSK VVS Samara; CSKA Moscow; Torpedo Nizhny Novgorod
- Playing career: 2015–present

Yegor Ogiyenko (born March 10, 1996) is a Russian professional ice hockey defenceman. He is currently playing with CSK VVS Samara of the Supreme Hockey League (VHL).

On February 24, 2015, Ogiyenko made his Kontinental Hockey League debut playing with HC CSKA Moscow during the 2014–15 KHL season.
