= Agapy =

Agapy (Russian: Ага́пий) is a Russian Christian male first name. Its feminine version is Agapiya. The name is derived from the Greek word meaning loved one (cf. agape feast). Its colloquial forms are Agafy (Ага́фий), Agafey (Ага́фей), Ogafey (Ога́фей), and Ogafy (Ога́фий).

The diminutives of "Agapy" are Agap (Ага́п; which can also be a main form of a related name), Ogap (Ога́п), and Gapey (Гапей).

"Agapy" is also an old form of the first name Agap. The patronymics derived from this form are "Ага́пиевич" (Agapiyevich), "Ага́пьевич" (Agapyevich; both masculine); and "Ага́пиевна" (Agapiyevna), "Ага́пьевна" (Agapyevna; both feminine).
