= Agapiya =

- Gender: Female
- Language(s): Greek and Russian

Origin
- Meaning: loved

Agapiya (Russian: Ага́пия, from Ancient Greek: Ἀγάπη) is an old and uncommon Russian Christian female first name. Its masculine version is Agapy. Its colloquial form is Ogapiya (Ога́пия). The substandard colloquial form Agapeya (Агапе́я) was also used.

The diminutives of "Agapiya" are Agapa (Ага́па), Gapa (Га́па), Ganya (Га́ня), Gasya (Га́ся), Aga (А́га), and Agasha (Ага́ша).
