= Mikhail Agafonov =

Russian operatic tenor

Mikhail Agafonov (Russian: Михаил Агафонов) is a Russian tenor singer who was born in Moscow and was a graduate of Lunatscharsky Academy for Performing Arts.

== Career ==
In 1993 after graduating from the Academy he joined the Bolshoi Theatre where he sang in such roles as Lensky and Lykov in The Tsar's Bride, Rodolfo in La bohème, Alfredo in La traviata, the title role in Faust and Pollione in Norma. In 1997 he became a recipient of the first prize at the Zimin International Vocal Competition and then became contract singer at the Vienna Volksoper where he played the role of Nemorino in Gaetano Donizetti's L'elisir d'amore and other roles. Later on he performed as Italian Singer in Der Rosenkavalier at Vienna State Opera and then played as Pollione at the Royal Swedish Opera, Berlin State Opera and Israeli Opera. He also sang the Astrologer Nikolai Rimsky-Korsakov's The Golden Cockerel at The Royal Opera London, and then appeared as Rodolfo at the Bavarian State Opera and the Hessisches Staatstheater Wiesbaden. At Deutsche Oper Berlin he appeared once as Pinkerton and then performed as Manrico at the Aalto Theatre which was followed by his appearance as Dick Johnson at the Florida Grand Opera. He followed with performances at the Canadian Opera in the roles of Riccardo, Calaf, and Rodolfo from Giuseppe Verdi's Luisa Miller. He performed as a concert singer at Alte Oper Frankfurt, Essen Philharmonic and Queen Elizabeth Hall, London. As of 2001 he is a member of Mannheim National Theatre where he sings as Duca, Radames, and Assad from Goldmark's Die Königin von Saba and many others.

From 2008 to 2009 he performed as Bacchus in Ariadne auf Naxos and the same years appeared as both Erik and Luigi in Il tabarro and Stewa in Mannheim, Germany. In the first half of 2009 he played as Gabriele Adorno in Toronto and then appeared as Cavaradossi with the Paris Opera. In the last half of 2009 he performed in Andrea Chénier and then appeared as Riccardo at the Swedish capital. In 2010 he performed in cities such as Antwerp and Gent in one of which he appeared as Cavaradossi at Semperoper in Dresden. In 2012 he played Herman in Tchaikovsky's The Queen of Spades and then the same year played Calaf in Giacomo Puccini's Turandot.
