= Agapit =

Agapit (Russian: Агапи́т) is an old and uncommon Russian Christian male first name. The name is derived from the Greek word agapētos, meaning loved one.

Its colloquial variant is Agap (Ага́п; which can also be the main form of a related name).

The diminutives of "Agapit" are Aga (А́га), Agapitka (Агапи́тка), Agapka (Ага́пка), Gapa (Га́па), and Gasha (Га́ша).

The patronymics derived from "Agapit" are "Агапи́тович" (Agapitovich; masculine) and "Агапи́товна" (Agapitovna; feminine).

== Notable people ==
- Agapetus of the Kiev Caves (?-1095), doctor and monk in Kyiv Pechersk Lavra
- Agapit Chicagou (fl. 1725–1731), Native American tribal leader
- Agapit Leblanc (1887–1926), Canadian Fishery officer
- Agapit Stevens (1848–1924), Belgian painter
- Agapit Vallmitjana i Barbany (1832–1905), Spanish sculptor
