= Agafonik =

- Gender: Male
- Language: Russian

Origin
- Origin: Greek
- Meaning: “Kind victory”
- Region of origin: Russia

Other names
- Related names: Agathonikos

Agafonik (Russian: Агафо́ник) is an old and uncommon Russian Christian male first name. Its feminine version is Agafonika. The name is derived from the Greek name Agathonikos, which in turn derives from words agathos—meaning kind—and nikē—meaning victory.

The diminutives of "Agafonik" are Agafonya (Агафо́ня) and Agafosha (Агафо́ша), as well as Gafon (Гафо́н), Gapon (Гапо́н), Gafa (Га́фа), Gapa (Га́па), Nika (Ни́ка), and Aga (А́га).

The patronymics derived from "Agafonik" are "Агафо́никович" (Agafonikovich; masculine) and "Агафо́никовна" (Agafonikovna; feminine).
