= Agap =

Agap (Russian: Ага́п) is a Russian male first name. The name is derived from the Greek name Agapios, which in turn derives from the verb agapaō, meaning "to love". The name's old form, as well as the form used by the Russian Orthodox Church, is Agapy (Ага́пий). The nonstandard colloquial form Agapey (Агапе́й) was also used.

The diminutives of "Agap" are Agapka (Ага́пка), Gapa (Га́па), Aga (А́га), Aganya (Ага́ня), Ganya (Га́ня), Agasha (Ага́ша), and Gasha (Га́ша).

The patronymics derived from "Agap" are "Ага́пович" (Agapovich; masculine) and its colloquial form "Ага́пыч" (Agapych), and "Ага́повна" (Avapovna; feminine).

== See also ==
- Agapit, a related name
