= Agafon =

Agafon (Russian: Агафо́н) is a Russian Christian male first name. The name is derived from the Greek word agathon, meaning kindness, goodness. Variants of this name used by the common people include Agafony (Агафо́ний), Ogafon (Огафо́н), Ogofon (Огофо́н), and Ogafony (Огафо́ний). Other colloquial forms include Gapon (Гапо́н) and Gafon (Гафо́н). The substandard colloquial form Agapon (Агапо́н) was also used.

The diminutives of "Agafon" are Aga (А́га), Gafa (Га́фа), and Gasha (Га́ша), as well as Agafonka (Агафо́нка), Agafonya (Агафо́ня), Afonya (Афо́ня), Fonya (Фо́ня), Agafosha (Агафо́ша), Fosha (Фо́ша), Aganya (Ага́ня), Agasha (Ага́ша), Agaposha (Агапо́ша), Gaposha (Гапо́ша), and Gapa (Га́па). Also used rarely are Gafya (Гафья) and Gafka (Гафка).

The patronymics derived from "Agafon" are "Агафо́нович" (Agafonovich; masculine) and its colloquial form "Агафо́ныч" (Agafonych), and "Агафо́новна" (Agafonovna; feminine).

"Agaton" is the Westernized form of this first name.

Last names derived from this first name include Agafonov and possibly Agin, Agish, and Agishev.
