= List of HC Slovan Bratislava seasons =

This is a list of seasons and results completed by HC Slovan Bratislava since its foundation.

Champion	Runner-up	3rd place	Won regular season	Promoted	Relegated	League top scorer

== League results ==
=== 1920s ===
Season	League	Regular season							Postseason						Result	Top scorer (regular season)
Season	League	Place	GP	W	T	L	GF	GA	GP	W	T	L	GF	GA	Result	Top scorer (regular season)
1924–25	Czechoslovak Championship	N/A	1	0	0	1	0	6	—N/a						Friendly matches only	—N/a
1925–26	Czechoslovak Championship	N/A	3	2	0	1	6	6	—N/a						Friendly matches only	???

=== 1930s ===
Season	League	Regular season							Postseason						Result	Top scorer (regular season)
Season	League	Place	GP	W	T	L	GF	GA	GP	W	T	L	GF	GA	Result	Top scorer (regular season)
1930–31	???	Data unavailable														
1931–32	Slovak Championship	N/A	3	1	0	2	5	9	Did not qualify						Eliminated in Western Slovakia Qualification Round	(Czechoslovakia) Jakeš 2 goals
1932–33	???	Data unavailable														
1933–34	Slovak Championship	4	3	0	1	2	2	7	Did not qualify						Finished 4th in Bratislava, 1–2 (Vyf. Sport)	???
1934-35	Slovak Championship	4	3	1	0	2	3	9	Did not qualify						Finished 4th in Bratislava, 0–4 (Slávia Bratislava)	
1935-36	???	Data unavailable														
1936-37	???	Data unavailable														
1937-38	???	Data unavailable														
1938-39	???	Data unavailable														
1939-40	???	Data unavailable														

=== 1940s ===
Season	League	Regular season									Postseason							Result	Top scorer (regular season)
Season	League	Place	GP	W	T	L	GF	GA	+/-	Pts	GP	W	T	L	GF	GA	Pts	Result	Top scorer (regular season)
1940–41	Slovak League	1st	3	3	0	0	10	4	+6	6	—N/a							Champions of Slovak League	???
1941–42	Slovak League	1st	3	2	1	0	7	5	+2	5	—N/a							Champions of Slovak League	???
1942–43	Slovak League	2nd	3	2	0	1	11	4	+7	4	—N/a							Finished 2nd overall	???
1943–44	Slovak League	2nd	3	2	0	1	5	6	-1	4	—N/a							Finished 2nd overall	???
1944-45	Data unavailable																		
1945–46	Czechoslovak Extraliga	3rd	5	4	0	1	22	9	+13	8	Did not qualify							Finished 3rd overall	???
1946–47	Czechoslovak Extraliga	3rd	4	3	0	1	25	26	-1	6	Did not qualify							Finished 3rd overall	(Czechoslovakia) W.Ulrich 14 goals
1947–48	Czechoslovak Extraliga	3rd	5	3	1	1	28	21	+7	7	Did not qualify							Finished 3rd overall	???
1948–49	Czechoslovak Extraliga	2nd	7	4	1	2	30	30	0	9	—N/a							Finished 2nd overall	???
1949–50	Czechoslovak Extraliga	6th	14	4	2	8	55	78	-23	10	—N/a							Finished 6th overall	(Czechoslovakia) J. Reitmayer 13 goals

=== 1950s ===
Season	League	Regular season									Postseason								Result	Top scorer (regular season)
Season	League	Place	GP	W	T	L	GF	GA	+/-	Pts	GP	W	T	L	GF	GA	Pts	HW	Result	Top scorer (regular season)
1950–51	Czechoslovak Extraliga	5th	14	6	3	6	61	75	-14	14	—N/a								Finished 5th overall	(Czechoslovakia) J. Reitmayer 21 goals
1951–52	Czechoslovak Extraliga	7th	10	6	1	3	66	51	+15	13	Did not qualify								Finished 7th overall	???
1952–53	Czechoslovak Extraliga	13th	12	5	1	6	76	51	+25	11	Did not qualify								Finished 13th overall	(Czechoslovakia) P. Zábojník 25 goals
1953–54	Czechoslovak Extraliga	18th	10	0	0	10	31	96	-65	0	Did not qualify								Finished last, Relegated to 2nd league	???
1954-1955	2nd Czechoslovak Extraliga	1st	6	4	2	0	38	17	+21	10	10	7	0	3	48	26	16		Finished 2nd, Promoted	???
1955–56	Czechoslovak Extraliga	14th	12	1	0	11	29	76	-47	2	Did not qualify								Finished 14th overall	???
1956–57	Czechoslovak Extraliga	6th	26	15	1	10	106	100	+6	31	—N/a								Finished 6th overall	(Czechoslovakia) J. Golonka 19 goals
1957–58	Czechoslovak Extraliga	8th	22	10	1	11	72	76	-4	21	—N/a								Finished 8th overall	(Czechoslovakia) J. Starší 18 goals
1958–59	Czechoslovak Extraliga	8th	22	9	4	9	80	75	+5	22	—N/a								Finished 8th overall	(Czechoslovakia) J. Starší 15 goals
1959–60	Czechoslovak Extraliga	2nd	22	16	0	6	125	79	+46	32	—N/a							15:0 27.11.1959 vs Opava	Finished 2nd overall	(Czechoslovakia) J. Starší 26 goals

=== 1960s ===
Season	League	Regular season								Postseason									Home	Away		Result	Top scorer (regular season)
Season	League	Place	GP	W	T	L	GF	GA	Pts	GP	W	T	L	GF	GA	Pts	+/-	M	record	record	HW	Result	Top scorer (regular season)
1960–61	Czechoslovak Extraliga	2nd	22	15	1	6	114	63	31	32	20	2	10	161	108	42	+53	-3	14-2-0 98:34	6-0-10 63:74	11:3 23.10.1960 vs Gottwaldov	Finished 2nd overall	(Czechoslovakia) J. Golonka 35 goals
1961–62	Czechoslovak Extraliga	1st	22	16	3	3	119	58	35	32	22	5	5	161	83	49	+78	-2	13-2-1 95:30	9-3-4 66:53	14:2 29.11.1961 vs Plzeň	Finished 2nd overall	(Czechoslovakia) J. Golonka 31 goals
1962–63	Czechoslovak Extraliga	2nd	22	12	7	3	107	62	31	32	17	7	8	141	95	41	+46	-14	12-4-0 91:38	5-3-8 50:57	12:2 02.12.1962 vs Spartak ZJŠ Brno	Finished 3rd overall	(Czechoslovakia) J. Golonka 23 goals
1963–64	Czechoslovak Extraliga	3rd	22	13	4	6	101	66	30	32	18	5	9	138	105	41	+33	-17	10-2-4 74:55	8-3-5 64:50	12:3 27.11.1963 vs Litvínov	Finished 2nd overall	(Czechoslovakia) J. Golonka 28 goals
1964–65	Czechoslovak Extraliga	3rd	22	16	1	5	117	84	33	32	21	2	9	164	113	44	+51	-7	13-1-2 98:38	8-1-7 66:75	10:1 04.10.1964 vs Kladno	Finished 2nd overall	(Czechoslovakia) V. Nedomanský 31 goals
1965–66	Czechoslovak Extraliga	3rd	36	23	6	7	191	122	52	—N/a							+69	-4	15-1-2 113:55	8-5-5 78:67	15:3 19.10.1965 vs Plzeň	Finished 3rd overall	(Czechoslovakia) V. Nedomanský 39 goals
1966–67	Czechoslovak Extraliga	4th	36	21	2	13	180	123	44	—N/a							+57	-8	14-1-3 106:47	7-1-10 74:76	15:0 18.01.1967 vs Litvínov	Finished 4th overall	(Czechoslovakia) V. Nedomanský 40 goals
1967–68	Czechoslovak Extraliga	4th	36	21	4	11	158	99	46	—N/a							+59	-13	13-2-3 97:37	8-2-8 61:62	10:4 11.11.1967 vs Chomutov	Finished 4th overall	(Czechoslovakia) V. Nedomanský 34 goals
1968–69	Czechoslovak Extraliga	3rd	36	22	5	9	147	115	49	—N/a							+32	-10	12-3-3 86:51	10-2-6 61:64	11:3 14.12.1968 vs Pardubice	Finished 3rd overall	(Czechoslovakia) V. Nedomanský 27 goals
1969–70	Czechoslovak Extraliga	2nd	36	21	7	8	133	81	49	—N/a							+52	-3	13-3-2 70:30	8-4-6 63:51	9:2 14.12.1969 vs Gottwaldov	Finished 2nd overall	(Czechoslovakia) V. Nedomanský 42 (29+13)

=== 1970s ===
Season	League	Regular season													Postseason									Result	Top scorer (regular season)
Season	League	Place	GP	W	OW	T	OL	L	GF	GA	+/-	Pts	M	HW	GP	W	OW	T	OL	L	GF	GA	Pts	Result	Top scorer (regular season)
1970–71	Czechoslovak Extraliga	4th	36	17	-	5	-	14	127	103	+24	39	-8	11:1 22.02.1971 vs České Budějovice	7	2	1	-	0	4	22	23	-	Finished 3rd, 2–0 (SONP Kladno)	(Czechoslovakia) V. Nedomanský 46 (31+15)
1971–72	Czechoslovak Extraliga	2nd	36	19	-	8	-	9	135	88	+47	46	-2	9:1 12.10.1971 vs Košice 9:1 22.02.1972 vs Gottwaldov										Finished 2nd overall	(Czechoslovakia) V. Nedomanský 56 (35+21)
1972–73	Czechoslovak Extraliga	3rd	36	16	-	6	-	14	119	117	+2	38	-13	8:1 02.03.1973 vs České Budějovice	9	3	2	-	2	4	25	39	-	Finished 3rd, 3–2 (SONP Kladno)	(Czechoslovakia) J. Haas 46 (32+14)
1973–74	Czechoslovak Extraliga	7th	44	19	-	6	-	19	162	177	-15	44	-25	12:2 18.09.1973 vs Chomutov	—N/a									Finished 7th overall	(Czechoslovakia) V. Nedomanský 74 (46+28)
1974–75	Czechoslovak Extraliga	5th	44	22	-	2	-	20	145	155	-10	46	-16	10:4 04.10.1974 vs Brno	—N/a									Finished 5th overall	(Czechoslovakia) M. Šťastný 63 (36+27)
1975–76	Czechoslovak Extraliga	8th	22	9	-	3	-	10	72	78	-6	21	-9	8:1 30.09.1975 vs Košice	10	4	-	0	-	6	39	38	8	Finished 4th in Relegation group	(Czechoslovakia) P. Šťastný 28 (19+9)
1976–77	Czechoslovak Extraliga	6th	44	19	-	6	-	19	118	125	-7	44	-26	7:1 03.04.1977 vs Plzeň	—N/a									Finished 6th overall	(Czechoslovakia) P. Šťastný 50 (24+26)
1977–78	Czechoslovak Extraliga	8th	44	16	-	6	-	22	151	159	-8	38	-25	11:1 03.03.1978 vs Brno	—N/a									Finished 8th overall	(Czechoslovakia) M. Šťastný 56 (33+23)
1978–79	Czechoslovak Extraliga	1st	44	27	-	6	-	11	215	129	+86	60	+3	12:6 26.01.1979 vs Košice	—N/a									Won Czechoslovak Championship	(Czechoslovakia) M. Šťastný 74 (39+35)
1979–80	Czechoslovak Extraliga	3rd	44	25	-	5	-	14	195	162	+33	55	-16	11:4 28.03.1980 vs Litvínov	—N/a									Finished 3rd	(Czechoslovakia) A. Šťastný 60 (30+30)

=== 1980s ===
Season	League	Regular season													Postseason								Top scorer (regular season)
Season	League	Place	GP	W	OW	T	OL	L	GF	GA	+/-	Pts	M	HW	GP	W	T	L	GF	GA	Pts	Result	Top scorer (regular season)
1980–81	Czechoslovak Extraliga	12th	44	14	0	-	9	21	155	198	-43	28	-40	11:5 13.01.1981 vs Trenčín	—N/a							Relegated, 12th place overall	(Czechoslovakia) D. Rusnák 58 (32+26)
1981-82	Slovak National Hockey League	1st	44	34	-	6	-	4	295	115	+180	74	+14	13:1 06.10.1981 vs Spišská Nová Ves	—N/a							Promoted to Extraliga, 2–0 (TJ Lokomotíva Meochema Přerov)	???
1982–83	Czechoslovak Extraliga	10th	44	16	-	5	-	23	141	175	-34	37	-25	9:4 01.02.1983 vs Brno	—N/a							10th place overall	(Czechoslovakia) D. Pašek 46 (23+23)
1983–84	Czechoslovak Extraliga	9th	44	14	-	7	-	23	147	176	-29	35	-30	6:2 18.11.1983 vs Vítkovice	—N/a							9th place overall	(Czechoslovakia) D. Pašek 48 (27+21)
1984–85	Czechoslovak Extraliga	10th	44	15	-	3	-	26	115	185	-70	33	-37	7:4 02.11.1984 vs Vítkovice	—N/a							10th place overall	(Czechoslovakia) D. Pašek 37 (23+14)
1985–86	Czechoslovak Extraliga	11th	34	7	-	6	-	21	97	145	-48	20	-28	11:3 23.03.1986 vs České Budějovice	12	7	0	5	55	36	15	Finished 1st in Relegation round	???
1986–87	Czechoslovak Extraliga	7th	34	17	-	1	-	16	126	140	-14	35	-11		2	0	0	2	3	10	-	Lost in quarterfinal, 0–2 (Sparta ČKD Prague)	(Czechoslovakia) D. Pašek 45 (18+27)
1987–88	Czechoslovak Extraliga	11th	34	7	-	7	-	20	87	134	-47	21	-24		12				45	42	13	Finished 3rd in Relegation round	???
1988–89	Czechoslovak Extraliga	12th	34	3	-	6	-	25	95	159	-64	12	-40		16	5	3	8	45	59	13	Relegated, Finished 5th in Relegation round	(Czechoslovakia) D. Rusnák 31 (16+15)
1989–90	Slovak National Hockey League	1st	44	32	-	5	-	7	251	104	+147	69	+1	15:0 vs Michalovce ???	10	6	0	4	36	20	12	Promoted to Extraliga, Finished 2nd in Qualification round	???

=== 1990s ===
Season	League	Regular season												Play-Off								Top scorer (regular season)
Season	League	Place	GP	W	T	L	GF	GA	+/-	Pts	M	HW	HL	GP	W	OW	OL	L	GF	GA	Result	Top scorer (regular season)
1990–91	Czechoslovak Extraliga	8th	52	22	9	21	164	187	-23	53	-15			Did not qualify							Finished 8th overall	(Czechoslovakia) M. Horváth 47 (22+25)
1991–92	Czechoslovak Extraliga	12th	38	11	9	19	112	134	-22	31	-18			3	0	0	0	3	3	12	Lost in qualification round, 0–3 (HC Dukla Jihlava)	(Slovakia) J. Pethö 36 (13+23)
1992–93	Czechoslovak Extraliga	13th	40	12	7	21	115	145	-30	31	-22	10:2 01.12.1992 vs Trenčín	5:10 17.01.1993 vs Livínov	Did not qualify							Finished 13th overall	(Czechoslovakia) L. Karabin 44 (21+23)
1993–94	Slovak Extraliga	3rd	36	21	6	9	124	93	+31	48	-6	8:0 18.01.1994 vs Zvolen	4:8 14.10.1993 vs Košice	8	3	0	0	5	22	27	Lost in semifinals, 2-3 (HC Košice) Finished 4th, 1–2 (Martimex ZŤS Martin)	(Slovakia) J. Pethö 43 (18+25)
1994–95	Slovak Extraliga	3rd	36	23	2	11	167	117	+50	71	-15	10:0 06.12.1994 vs Nitra	4:11 20.01.1995 vs Trenčín	9	5	0	0	4	29	35	Won in quarterfinals, 3-0 (Martinex ZŤS Martin) Lost in semifinals, 0-3 (HC Košice) Finished 3rd, 2–1 (ŠKP PS Poprad)	(Slovakia) K. Rusznyák 52 (23+29)
1995–96	Slovak Extraliga	5th	36	18	5	13	127	123	+4	41	-14	9:5 06.10.1995 vs Martin	4:11 28.11.1995 vs Košice	13	5	2	2	4	48	48	Won in quarterfinals, 3-2 (ŠKP PS Poprad) Lost semifinals, 1-4 (HC Košice) Finished 3rd, 3–1 (Martimex ZŤS Martin)	(Slovakia) R. Kapuš 37 (17+20)
1996–97^{a}	Slovak Extraliga	5th	46	25	5	16	192	142	+50	58	-10	12:3 25.10.1996 vs Dubnica nad Váhom	1:7 26.01.1997 vs Košice	Did not qualify							Finished 5th, 2–0 (MHk 32 Liptovský Mikuláš)	(Slovakia) Ľ. Kolník 63 (34+29)
1997–98	Slovak Extraliga	1st	36	28	2	6	170	72	+98	58	+2	11:1 12.03.1997 vs Nitra	2:5 14.10.1997 vs Košice 2:5 23.01.1998 vs Zvolen	11	6	3	0	2	50	25	Won in quarterfinals, 3-0 (HK VTJ Spišská Nová Ves) Won in semifinals, 3-0 (Dukla Trenčín) Won Slovak Championship, 3–2 (HC Košice)	(Russia) R. Ilyin 53 (27+26)
1998–99	Slovak Extraliga	1st	42	32	5	5	245	102	+143	69	+23	12:0 19.03.1999 vs Spišská Nová Ves	3:6 12.01.1999 vs Trenčín	10	6	1	0	3	53	25	Won in quarterfinals, 3-0 (HK VTJ Spišská Nová Ves) Won in semifinals, 3-0 (HKm Zvolen) Lost in finals, 2–3 (HC VSŽ Košice)	(Russia) R. Ilyin 69 (33+36)
1999–00^{b}	Slovak Extraliga	1st	56	34	7	15	233	133	+100	75	+4	11:3 16.01.2000 vs Košice	2:6 28.01.2000 vs Trenčín	8	6	0	0	2	32	10	Won in semifinals, 3-0 (Dukla Trenčín) Won Slovak Championship, 3–2 (HKm Zvolen)	(Slovakia) Z. Cíger 62 (23+39)

=== 2000s ===
Season	League	Regular season															Play-Off								Top scorer (regular season)
Season	League	Place	GP	W	OW	T	OL	L	GF	GA	+/-	Pts	M	HW	PP%	PK%	GP	W	OW	OL	L	GF	GA	Result	Top scorer (regular season)
2000–01	Slovak Extraliga	2nd	56	31	3	7	4	11	223	117	+106	110	-15	13:5 13.10.2000 vs Trenčín			8	4	1	2	1	39	21	Won in quarterfinals, 3-0 (HK 32 Liptovský Mikuláš) Lost in semifinals, 2–3 (Dukla Trenčín)	(Slovakia) I. Rataj 58 (24+34)
2001–02^{c}	Slovak Extraliga	2nd	54	27	4	8	2	13	160	113	+47	72	-4	8:3 30.10.2001 vs Nitra			19	11	1	3	7	61	50	Won in quarterfinals, 4-3 (HK 32 Liptovský Mikuláš) Won in semifinals, 4-2 (HC Košice) Won Slovak Championship, 4–2 (HKm Zvolen)	(Slovakia) J. Halaj 50 (18+32)
2002–03	Slovak Extraliga	1st	54	32	1	9	3	9	195	111	+84	107	0	11:2 15.10.2002 vs Spišská Nová Ves			13	10	2	0	1	54	25	Won in quarterfinals, 4-0 (HK ŠKP Žilina) Won in semifinals, 4-1 (Dukla Trenčín) Won Slovak Championship, 4–0 (HC Košice)	(Slovakia) P. Junas 48 (22+26)
2003–04	Slovak Extraliga	3rd	54	29	2	9	1	13	178	116	+62	100	-21	10:3 21.09.2003 vs Poprad			12	6	1	3	2	41	28	Won in quarterfinals, 4-1 (HK 36 Skalica) Lost in semifinals, 3–4 (HKm Zvolen)	(Slovakia) Z. Cíger 60 (22+38)
2004–05	Slovak Extraliga	2nd	54	34	0	5	2	13	184	115	+69	107	0		17,88% (1st)	86,15% (6th)	19	12	0	2	5	66	53	Won in quarterfinals, 4-1 (HK Aquacity ŠKP Poprad) Won in semifinals, 4-3 (Dukla Trenčín) Won Slovak Championship, 4–3 (HKm Zvolen)	(Slovakia) R. Kapuš 54 (17+37)
2005–06	Slovak Extraliga	7th	54	22	3	4	1	24	140	143	-3	76	-23		15,60% (2nd)	82,65% (9th)	4	0	0	0	4	5	12	Lost in quarterfinals, 0–4 (HC Košice)	(Slovakia) M. Hujsa 47 (25+22)
2006–07^{d}	Slovak Extraliga	3rd	54	27	6	–	5	16	179	143	+36	93	-13		17,93% (2nd)	84,86% (4th)	14	12	0	0	2	52	22	Won Slovak Championship, 4–0 (Dukla Trenčín)	(Slovakia) M. Uram 63 (31+32)
2007–08	Slovak Extraliga	1st	54	35	7	–	2	10	195	130	+65	119	+16		16,22% (4th)	91,58% (2nd)	17	11	0	1	5	56	37	Won Slovak Championship, 4–3 (HC Košice)	(Slovakia) M. Kuľha 63 (33+30)
2008–09	Slovak Extraliga	2nd	56	29	11	–	3	13	215	149	+66	112	-4		16,60% (6th)	87,89% (3rd)	12	7	0	1	4	53	34	Lost in semifinals, 3–4 (HK 36 Skalica)	(Slovakia) R. Kukumberg 57 (18+39)
2009–10	Slovak Extraliga	1st	47	35	5	–	2	5	199	101	+98	117	+21		19,43% (2nd)	89,27% (1st)	15	7	3	0	5	57	40	Lost in finals, 2–4 (HC Košice)	(Slovakia) M. Kulha 57 (23+34)

=== 2010s ===
Season	HC Slovan	League	Regular season													Postseason								Top scorer (regular season)
Season	HC Slovan	League	Place	GP	W	OW	OL	L	GF	GA	+/-	Pts	M	PP%	PK%	GP	W	OW	OL	L	GF	GA	Result	Top scorer (regular season)
2010–11	–	Slovak Extraliga	4th	57	25	5	5	22	169	144	+25	90	-47	20,07% (1st)	87,96% (3rd)	7	3	0	1	3	22	22	Lost in quarterfinals, 3–4 (HK Dukla Trenčín)	(Slovakia) M. Hujsa 42 (15+27)
2011–12	–	Slovak Extraliga	3rd	55	31	1	7	16	176	138	+38	102	-8	17,99% (4th)	81,38% (11th)	16	10	2	1	3	61	40	Won Slovak Championship, 4–3 (HC Košice)	(Slovakia) M. Šatan 52 (23+29)
2012–13	2012–13	KHL	13th	52	17	11	5	19	124	127	-3	78				4	0	0	1	3	7	15	Lost in conference quarter-finals, 0–4 (Dynamo Moscow)	(Slovakia) M. Miklík 24 (9+15)
2013–14	2013–14	KHL	21st	54	15	9	4	26	120	160	-40	67				Did not qualify							Lost in the First Round of Nadezhda Cup, 0–2 (Dinamo Minsk)	(Slovakia) M. Miklík 32 (14+18)
2014–15	2014–15	KHL	26th	60	15	5	8	32	136	188	-52	63				Did not qualify							Finished 26th overall	(Slovakia) L. Nagy 41 (23+18)
2015–16	2015–16	KHL	15th	60	21	11	4	24	154	148	+6	89				4	0	0	1	3	4	10	Lost in conference quarter-finals, 0–4 (CSKA Moscow)	(Czech Republic) L. Kašpar 47 (16+31)
2016–17	2016–17	KHL	17th	60	22	7	5	26	144	166	-22	85				Did not qualify							Finished 17th overall	(United States) J. Taffe 43 (18+25)
2017–18	–	KHL	24th	56	15	3	7	31	119	187	-68	58				Did not qualify							Finished 24th overall	(Canada) C. Genoway 31 (9+22)
2018–19	–	KHL	25th	62	10	5	3	44	101	213	-112	33				Did not qualify							Finished 25th overall	(United States) J. Taffe 31 (12+19)
2019–20	–	Slovak Extraliga	2nd	55	29	8	5	13	191	118	+73	108	-12	17,28% (8th)	86,73% (2nd)	Not held due to the coronavirus pandemic							Not declared	(Czech Republic) J. Abdul 62 (23+39)

=== 2020s ===
Season	League	Regular season													Postseason								Top scorer (regular season)
Season	League	Place	GP	W	OW	OL	L	GF	GA	+/-	Pts	M	PP%	PK%	GP	W	OW	OL	L	GF	GA	Result	Top scorer (regular season)
2020–21	Slovak Extraliga	4th	50	26	6	4	14	146	115	+31	94	-9	17,04% (7th)	88,19% (1st)	10	4	1	2	3	29	26	Lost in semi-finals, 1–4 (HKm Zvolen)	(Canada) B. O'Donnell 41 (22+19)
2021–22	Slovak Extraliga	1st	50	32	3	5	10	189	118	+71	104	+4	24,66% (1st)	86,32% (1st)	17	10	2	1	4	56	38	Won Slovak Championship, 4–2 (HK Nitra)	(Canada) B. Harris 59 (21+38)
2022–23	Slovak Extraliga	2nd	50	27	3	6	14	162	115	+47	93	-3	23,12% (2nd)	85,39% (3rd)	6	2	0	2	2	14	11	Lost in quarter-finals, 2–4 (Dukla Michalovce)	(Canada) B. Harris 56 (29+27)
2023–24	Slovak Extraliga	5th	50	21	5	4	20	157	160	-3	77	-17	21,13% (6th)	77,52% (10th)	4	0	0	0	4	11	20	Lost in quarter-finals, 0–4 (HC Košice)	(United States) L. Pecararo 48 (17+31)
2024-25	Slovak Extraliga	7th	54	21	5	8	20	164	159	+5	81	-23	20,31% (6th)	80,47% (8th)	4	1	0	0	3	11	13	Lost in wild-card round, 1–3 (HKm Zvolen)	(Slovakia) S. Takáč 46 (16+30)
2025-26	Slovak Extraliga	2nd	54	26	9	6	13	176	139	+37	102	-10	22,11% (2nd)	79,19% (8th)	17	10	1	2	4	50	43	lost in final, 3–4 (HK Nitra)	(United States) R. Dmowski

== See also ==
- HC Slovan Bratislava all-time KHL record

== Notes ==
- Until 1985–1986 season no Play-offs were played
- ^{a} In 1996–1997 season the 6 best teams qualified for final round, in which each team played two games against all other teams. After the final round, 4 best teams qualified for play-offs, the other two teams played two games for 5th place.
- ^{b} In 1999–00 season only 8 teams participated in the league and only four teams played in the Play-off.
- ^{c} Since 2001–02 season the Play-off matches are played in best-of-seven format. Before this year, Slovak extraliga matches were played in best-of-five format.
- ^{d} Since 2006–07 season there are no ties in Slovak Extraliga. If the match is undecided after 60 minutes, a 5-min overtime follows. If it is still a draw, a penalty shootout decides the winner of the match. The winner of the match in regulation time gets 3 points, the loser gets 0 points. The winner after overtime (or shootout) gets 2 points, the loser gets 1 point.

== Other notable results ==
Season	Competition	Result
1972	Spengler Cup	Winner
1973	Spengler Cup	Winner
1974	Spengler Cup	Winner
1979–80	IIHF European Cup	Finished 3rd
2000–01	IIHF Continental Cup	Finished 3rd
2003–04	IIHF Continental Cup	Winner

=== Champions Hockey League ===
This table shows the results in Champions Hockey League (2008–09) - a competition that lasted only for one season.

Season	Group	Regular season									Postseason								Top scorer
Season	Group	Place	GP	W	OW	OL	L	GF	GA	Pts	GP	W	OW	OL	L	GF	GA	Result	Top scorer
2008–09	C	3rd	4	1	0	0	3	11	20	3	Did not qualify							Group stage	(Slovakia) M. Hujsa & (Slovakia) M. Lažo 4 (2+2)

The table below shows the results in Champions Hockey League, which is a different competition from Champions Hockey League (2008–09).

Season	Group	Regular season									Postseason								Top scorer
Season	Group	Place	GP	W	OW	OL	L	GF	GA	Pts	GP	W	OW	OL	L	GF	GA	Result	Top scorer
2014–19	Not eligible while playing in the KHL																		
2020–21	Did not qualify																		
2021–22	F	4th	6	0	0	0	6	8	23	0	Did not qualify							Group stage	(Slovakia) T. Zigo 3 (1+2)
2022–23	C	4th	6	0	0	0	6	9	26	0	Did not qualify							Group stage	(Slovakia) M. Haščák 4 (3+1)
2023–24	Did not qualify																		

=== European Trophy ===
Season	Group	Regular season									Postseason								Top scorer
Season	Group	Place	GP	W	OW	OL	L	GF	GA	Pts	GP	W	OW	OL	L	GF	GA	Result	Top scorer
2011	East	3rd	8	3	2	0	3	25	20	13	Did not qualify							Group stage	?
2012	South	6th	8	1	3	1	3	22	21	10	1	0	0	0	1	1	4	Lost in quarter-finals	?
2013	South	2nd	8	5	0	1	2	31	25	16	Did not qualify							Group stage	(Slovakia) M. Miklík 10 (3+7)

=== European Hockey League ===
Season	Group	Regular season									Postseason								Top scorer
Season	Group	Place	GP	W	OW	OL	L	GF	GA	Pts	GP	W	OW	OL	L	GF	GA	Result	Top scorer
1996–97	C	2nd	6	4	0	0	2	28	19	8	1	0	0	0	1	1	3	Quarter-finals	?
1997–98	Did not qualify																		
1998–99	B	3rd	6	2	0	3	1	17	17	9	Did not qualify							Group stage	?
1999–00	A	1st	6	4	0	1	1	18	13	13	1	0	0	0	1	5	6	Quarter-finals	?

=== IIHF Continental Cup ===
Season	Group	Regular season										Postseason									Top scorer
Season	Group	Place	GP	W	OW	T	OL	L	GF	GA	Pts	GP	W	OW	T	OL	L	GF	GA	Result	Top scorer
2000–01	N	1st	3	2	0	0	0	1	12	7	4	3	1	0	1	0	1	9	8	Finished 3rd	?
2002–03	L	1st	3	2	0	1	0	0	14	6	5	3	2	0	0	0	1	12	9	Finished 5th	?
2003–04	N	1st	2	2	0	0	0	0	8	5	4	1	1	0	0	0	0	6	2	Winner	?

=== Danube Cup ===
Season	GP	W	OW	OL	L	GF	GA	Pts	Result	Top scorer
2022	3	1	0	1	1	11	9	4	Finished 3rd	(Canada) B. Harris 5 (2+3)
