= Jaroslav Jiřík =

Czech ice hockey player

- Born: 10 December 1939 Vojnův Městec, Bohemia-Moravia
- Died: 11 July 2011 (aged 71) Brno, Czech Republic
- Height: 5 ft 11 in (180 cm)
- Weight: 170 lb (77 kg; 12 st 2 lb)
- Position: Left wing
- Shot: Left
- Played for: Sokol Kladno (Cze-1); Rudá hvězda/ZKL Brno (Cze-1); St. Louis Blues (NHL)
- National team: Czechoslovakia
- Playing career: 1957–1975

Medal record

Ice hockey

Representing Czechoslovakia

Olympic Games
Silver medal – second place	1968 Grenoble	
Bronze medal – third place	1964 Innsbruck	

World Championships
Silver medal – second place	1965 Finland	
Silver medal – second place	1966 Yugoslavia	
Bronze medal – third place	1959 Czechoslovakia	
Bronze medal – third place	1963 Sweden	
Bronze medal – third place	1969 Sweden	

Jaroslav Jiřík (10 December 1939 – 11 July 2011) was a Czech professional ice hockey right winger. He became the first player that an Eastern Bloc country released to play in the National Hockey League when he appeared in three games with the St. Louis Blues in the 1969–70 season.

== Playing career ==
Jiřík played seventeen seasons in the Czechoslovak Extraliga, scoring 300 goals in 450 games. Jiřík was named an all-star at the 1965 World Championship in Finland, and he was a member of the Czechoslovak national team that won the bronze medal at the 1964 Winter Olympics and the silver medal at the 1968 Winter Olympics. He scored 83 goals in 134 international games for Czechoslovakia.

Jiřík was first noticed by St. Louis Blues assistant general manager Cliff Fletcher in 1969. Fletcher actually signed three Czechoslovak players: Jiřík, Jan Havel, and Josef Horešovský, all of whom were given permission to transfer to North America by the Czechoslovak government. However, the government changed its mind about Havel and Horesovský, because they were still in their twenties. Jiřík, 30 at the time, was the only player allowed to go.

Jiřík spent most of the 1969–70 season with St. Louis's minor-league affiliate, the Kansas City Blues of the Central Hockey League. He played well in Kansas City, scoring 35 points in 53 games. St. Louis called him up late in the season, and he played three games with the club, going scoreless. He was invited to remain with the organization for the 1970–71 season; however, Jiřík decided to return to Czechoslovakia instead.

== Post-playing career ==
After his playing career, Jiřík coached several Czechoslovak clubs and ran the Swiss national team from 1977 to 1980.

On 11 July 2011, Jiřík, an experienced pilot, died in a plane crash near Brno.

== Career statistics ==
=== Regular season and playoffs ===
			Regular season					Playoffs
Season	Team	League	GP	G	A	Pts	PIM	GP	G	A	Pts	PIM
1956–57	HC Kladno	CZE	4	0	—	0	—	—	—	—	—	—
1957–58	HC Kladno	CZE	22	14	0	14	—	—	—	—	—	—
1958–59	HC Kladno	CZE	22	16	0	16	—	—	—	—	—	—
1959–60	HC Kladno	CZE	22	14	0	14	—	—	—	—	—	—
1960–61	HC Kladno	CZE	24	23	0	23	—	—	—	—	—	—
1961–62	Rudá hvězda Brno	CZE	31	28	11	39	—	—	—	—	—	—
1962–63	ZKL Brno	CZE	28	22	10	32	—	—	—	—	—	—
1963–64	ZKL Brno	CZE	6	3	0	3	—	—	—	—	—	—
1964–65	ZKL Brno	CZE	30	23	13	36	—	—	—	—	—	—
1965–66	ZKL Brno	CZE	35	26	13	39	—	—	—	—	—	—
1966–67	ZKL Brno	CZE	34	16	8	24	—	—	—	—	—	—
1967–68	ZKL Brno	CZE	28	16	15	31	—	—	—	—	—	—
1968–69	ZKL Brno	CZE	32	36	7	43	—	—	—	—	—	—
1969–70	St. Louis Blues	NHL	3	0	0	0	0	—	—	—	—	—
1969–70	Kansas City Blues	CHL	53	19	16	35	11	—	—	—	—	—
1970–71	ZKL Brno	CZE	31	25	12	37	—	8	6	0	6	—
1971–72	ZKL Brno	CZE	22	12	6	18	34	—	—	—	—	—
1972–73	ZKL Brno	CZE	26	13	2	15	16	—	—	—	—	—
1973–74	ZKL Brno	CZE	34	9	4	13	—	—	—	—	—	—
1974–75	ZKL Brno	CZE	15	4	4	8	—	—	—	—	—	—
CZE totals			446	300	—	—	—	—	—	—	—	—
NHL totals			3	0	0	0	0	—	—	—	—	—

=== International ===
Year	Team	Event	GP	G	A	Pts	PIM
1959	Czechoslovakia	WC	8	6	2	8	—
1960	Czechoslovakia	OLY	5	1	3	4	2
1963	Czechoslovakia	WC	7	4	3	7	9
1964	Czechoslovakia	OLY	7	3	1	4	6
1965	Czechoslovakia	WC	7	8	4	12	6
1966	Czechoslovakia	WC	7	4	1	5	2
1967	Czechoslovakia	WC	6	5	3	8	2
1968	Czechoslovakia	OLY	4	3	3	6	0
1969	Czechoslovakia	WC	5	2	3	5	0
Senior totals			56	36	23	59	27
