= Miroslav Pašek =

Czechoslovak ice hockey player (1922–1956)

- Born: 18 July 1922
- Died: 24 November 1956 (aged 34) Eglisau, Switzerland
- Position: Goaltender
- Played for: TJ Baník Chomutov ZJF
- National team: Czechoslovakia
- Playing career: 1951–1956

Miroslav Pašek (18 July 1922 – 24 November 1956) was a Czechoslovak ice hockey goaltender. He played with TJ Baník Chomutov ZJF in the Czechoslovak Extraliga and was a member of the Czechoslovakia men's national ice hockey team. After playing international matches in Switzerland, he was killed during the return flight in the 1956 Eglisau Ilyushin Il-12 plane crash.

== Biography ==
Pašek made his debut for Sokol Hutě playing in the 1951–52 Czechoslovak Extraliga and the next season in the 1952–53 Czechoslovak Extraliga. With TJ Baník Chomutov ZJF he played in the 1953–54 Czechoslovak Extraliga. He was part in the glory period of the team, finishing third in the 1954–55 Czechoslovak Extraliga season and second in the 1955–56 Czechoslovak Extraliga season, only three point from the winner.

Pašek was also a member of the Czechoslovakia men's national ice hockey team.

On 19 November 1956, the team went to Switzerland to play four international matches. Pašek was initially not selected to go to Switzerland, but this changed after goaltender Karel Straka was called-up to go play with the national team in England. Pašek was at the time in preparation for his wedding. He was excited to go to Switzerland, to go abroad and planned to buy wedding rings in Switzerland. In Switzerland they caused a stir winning all four matches with a total score of 39:16.

Because the team was asked to give up five seats of their return flight, Pašek flew together with four others of the club a few hours later on 24 November 1956. Shortly after take-off the airplane had an engine failure and in an attempt to return the airplane crashed in Eglisau. Pašek died in the crash at the age of 34 years old, together with all 22 people on board. During the funeral, attended by several thousand people, his coffin with remains was carried on each side by four players dressed in the kit of the club.
