= 1937–38 Czechoslovak Extraliga season =

Czechoslovak ice hockey season

The 1937–38 Czechoslovak Extraliga season was the second season of the Czechoslovak Extraliga, the top level of ice hockey in Czechoslovakia. 14 teams participated in the league, and LTC Prag won the championship. The league was not played again until the 1945–46 season, due to World War II.

== Regular season ==
=== Group A ===
Pl.	Team	GP	W	T	L	GF–GA	Pts
1.	LTC Prag	5	5	0	0	33–1	10
2.	I. ČLTK Prag	6	4	1	1	24–12	9
3.	HOVS Prag	5	2	2	1	12–11	6
4.	SK Písek	4	2	1	1	8–14	5
5.	SSK Vítkovice	5	1	1	3	2–14	3
6.	BK Mladá Boleslav	5	1	0	4	6–17	2
7.	Troppauer EV Opava	4	0	1	3	0–16	1

=== Group B ===
Pl.	Team	GP	W	T	L	GF–GA	Pts
1.	AC Sparta Prag	4	4	0	0	24–3	8
2.	HC Tatry Poprad	5	4	0	1	16–3	8
3.	DFK Komotau	4	2	0	2	10–10	4
4.	DSK Třebíč	4	1	1	2	8–13	3
5.	VŠ Bratislava	2	1	0	1	4–5	2
6.	AC Stadion České Budějovice	4	0	1	3	3–17	1
7.	LTC Pardubice	3	0	0	3	1–15	0

== Final ==
- LTC Prag 5 AC Sparta Prag 1
