= 1954–55 Czechoslovak Extraliga season =

Czechoslovak ice hockey season

The 1954–55 Czechoslovak Extraliga season was the 12th season of the Czechoslovak Extraliga, the top level of ice hockey in Czechoslovakia. 16 teams participated in the league, and Rudá Hvězda Brno won the championship.

== Group A ==
Pl.	Team	GP	W	T	L	GF–GA	Pts
1.	Rudá Hvězda Brno	14	11	2	1	82:32	24
2.	Tankista Prag	14	9	3	2	65:42	21
3.	Křídla vlasti Olomouc	14	8	0	6	65:47	16
4.	Baník Vítkovice	14	6	2	6	51:45	14
5.	Spartak Královo Pole	14	5	4	5	38:47	14
6.	Dynamo Pardubice	14	4	2	8	54:62	10
7.	Spartak ZJŠ Brno	14	3	3	8	42:67	9
8.	Baník OKD Ostrava	14	1	2	11	37:92	4

== Group B ==
Pl.	Team	GP	W	T	L	GF–GA	Pts
1.	Spartak Praha Sokolovo	14	11	1	2	75:32	23
2.	Baník Chomutov	14	9	2	3	89:43	20
3.	Dynamo Karlovy Vary	14	7	0	7	61:69	14
4.	Slavoj České Budějovice	14	6	1	7	70:62	13
5.	Motorlet Prag	14	6	0	8	65:76	12
6.	Spartak LZ Plzeň	14	6	0	8	48:61	12
7.	ÚDA Praha	14	5	1	8	44:70	11
8.	Tatra Smíchov	14	3	1	10	44:83	7

== Final round ==
Pl.	Team	GP	W	T	L	GF–GA	Pts
1.	Rudá Hvězda Brno	3	2	1	0	14:7	5
2.	Tankista Prag	3	1	1	1	8:7	3
3.	Baník Chomutov	3	1	0	2	9:9	2
4.	Spartak Praha Sokolovo	3	1	0	2	7:15	2

== 1. Liga-Qualification ==
Pl.	Team	GP	W	T	L	GF–GA	Pts
1.	Baník Kladno	10	8	0	2	48:26	16
2.	Slovan Bratislava	10	7	0	3	62:30	14
3.	Tatran Prostějov	10	5	0	5	50:43	10
4.	Jiskra Havlíčkův Brod	10	4	1	5	38:40	9
5.	Dynamo Prag	10	3	2	5	35:46	8
6.	TJ Tatran Poprad	10	0	3	7	21:69	3
