= 1948–49 Czechoslovak Extraliga season =

Czechoslovak ice hockey season

The 1948–49 Czechoslovak Extraliga season was the sixth season of the Czechoslovak Extraliga, the top level of ice hockey in Czechoslovakia. Eight teams participated in the league, and LTC Prag won the championship.

== Regular season ==
Pl.	Team	GP	W	T	L	GF–GA	Pts
1.	LTC Prag	7	7	0	0	70:23	14
2.	ŠK Bratislava	7	4	1	2	30:30	9
3.	ATK Praha	7	4	0	3	39:29	8
4.	AC Stadion České Budějovice	7	4	0	3	31:32	8
5.	Sokol Zbrojovka Židenice	7	3	1	3	32:42	7
6.	AC Sparta Bubeneč	7	3	0	4	28:26	6
7.	Sokol Prostějov	7	2	0	5	22:46	4
8.	I. ČLTK Prag	7	0	0	7	21:46	0

== 1. Liga-Qualification ==
Place	Team	Pts	+/-
1.	ZSJ GZ Královo Pole	4	+6
2.	ZSJ Vítkovické železárny	4	+3
3.	Meteor České Budějovice	4	+1
4.	ZSJ Slavia Pardubice	0	±0
