= 1953–54 Czechoslovak Extraliga season =

Czechoslovak Extraliga season

The 1953–54 Czechoslovak Extraliga season was the 11th season of the Czechoslovak Extraliga, the top level of ice hockey in Czechoslovakia. 18 teams participated in the league, and ZSJ Spartak Praha Sokolovo won the championship.

== Group A ==
Pl.	Team	GP	W	T	L	GF–GA	Pts
1.	ZSJ Spartak Sokolovo Prag	10	9	1	0	67:21	19
2.	Křídla vlasti Olomouc	10	5	2	3	53:29	12
3.	Sparta Brno ZJŠ	10	5	2	3	37:38	12
4.	Baník Chomutov	10	4	1	5	42:39	9
5.	Tankista Prag	10	3	2	5	39:49	8
6.	ÚNV Slovan Bratislava	10	0	0	10	31:96	0

== Group B ==
Pl.	Team	GP	W	T	L	GF–GA	Pts
1.	Rudá hvězda Brno	10	8	0	2	66:32	16
2.	Baník Vítkovice	10	6	0	4	37:41	12
3.	Spartak Tatra Smíchov	10	4	1	5	32:45	9
4.	Dynamo Karlovy Vary	10	3	2	5	47:51	8
5.	Spartak Plzeň ZVIL	10	3	2	5	49:55	8
6.	Dynamo Pardubice	10	2	3	5	39:46	7

== Group C ==
Pl.	Team	GP	W	T	L	GF–GA	Pts
1.	ÚDA Praha	10	9	0	1	52:29	18
2.	Slavoj České Budějovice	10	6	1	3	73:37	13
3.	Spartak Královo Pole	10	5	1	4	39:37	11
4.	Baník Ostrava OKD	10	4	1	5	69:51	9
5.	Spartak Motorlet Prag	10	3	1	6	32:47	7
6.	Tatran Poprad	10	1	0	9	32:86	2

== Final ==
Pl.	Team	GP	W	T	L	GF–GA	Pts
1.	ZSJ Spartak Sokolovo Prag	5	4	1	0	32:10	9
2.	Rudá hvězda Brno	5	4	1	0	21:10	9
3.	Křídla vlasti Olomouc	5	2	1	2	23:26	5
4.	Baník Vítkovice	5	2	0	3	13:17	4
5.	ÚDA Praha	5	1	0	4	12:27	2
6.	Slavoj České Budějovice	5	0	1	4	18:29	1
