= Libor Zábranský (ice hockey, born 1973) =

Czech ice hockey player

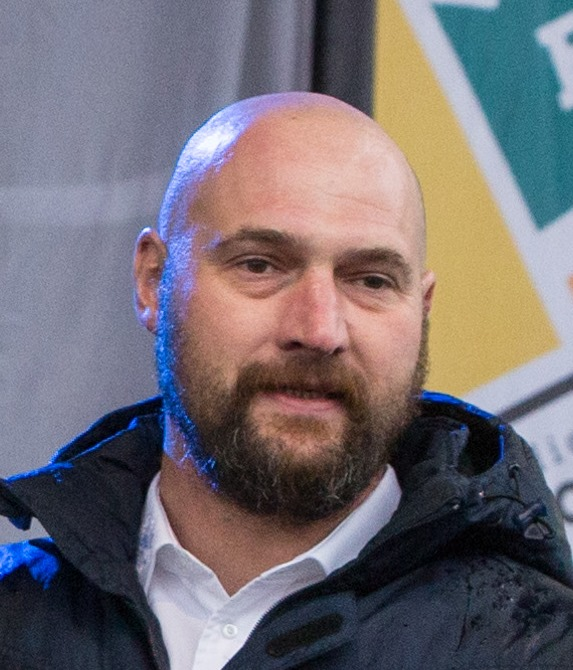
- Born: 25 November 1973 (age 52) Brno, Czechoslovakia
- Height: 6 ft 4 in (193 cm)
- Weight: 227 lb (103 kg; 16 st 3 lb)
- Position: Defenceman
- Shot: Left
- National team: Czech Republic
- Playing career: 1991–2004

Libor "Zábrda" Zábranský (born 25 November 1973) is a Czech former professional ice hockey defenceman and current coach.

== Playing career ==
Zábranský was drafted 209th overall in the 9th round of the 1995 NHL entry draft by the St. Louis Blues. He played the majority of his career in the Czech Republic but he did play 40 games over two seasons with St. Louis in the NHL. After retiring from playing due to health problems at the age of 30, he became majority owner of the Czech Extraliga team Kometa Brno.

== Career statistics ==
			Regular season					Playoffs
Season	Team	League	GP	G	A	Pts	PIM	GP	G	A	Pts	PIM
1990–91	HC Zetor Brno	TCH U20	—	—	—	—	—	—	—	—	—	—
1991–92	HC Zetor Brno	TCH	31	1	2	3	30	—	—	—	—	—
1992–93	HC Královopolská Brno	TCH.2	30	3	1	4	41	—	—	—	—	—
1993–94	HC Královopolská Brno	CZE.2	5	1	0	1	4	—	—	—	—	—
1993–94	HC VS VTJ Tábor	CZE.2	—	4	7	11	—	—	—	—	—	—
1994–95	HC České Budějovice	ELH	44	2	7	9	54	9	0	4	4	6
1995–95	HC České Budějovice	ELH	40	4	7	11	24	10	0	1	1	10
1996–97	St. Louis Blues	NHL	34	1	5	6	44	—	—	—	—	—
1996–97	Worcester IceCats	AHL	23	3	6	9	24	5	2	5	7	6
1997–98	St. Louis Blues	NHL	6	0	1	1	6	—	—	—	—	—
1997–98	Worcester IceCats	AHL	54	2	17	19	61	6	1	1	2	8
1998–99	Worcester IceCats	AHL	6	0	0	0	18	—	—	—	—	—
1998–99	HC Slovnaft Vsetín	ELH	30	3	8	11	55	12	1	2	3	16
1999–2000	HC Slovnaft Vsetín	ELH	47	6	17	23	87	9	0	2	2	10
2000–01	HC Sparta Praha	ELH	51	8	8	16	54	11	0	3	3	45
2001–02	HC Sparta Praha	ELH	7	0	2	2	10	—	—	—	—	—
2002–03	HC ČSOB Pojišťovna Pardubice	ELH	7	0	3	3	12	12	0	5	5	16
2003–04	HC Moeller Pardubice	ELH	40	1	11	12	55	7	0	0	0	12
ELH totals			266	24	63	87	351	70	1	17	18	115
NHL totals			40	1	6	7	50	—	—	—	—	—
