= ÚDA Praha =

ÚDA Praha may refer to:

- Dukla Prague, football team competing as ÚDA Praha between 1953 and 1956
- HC ATK Praha, ice hockey team known under the name of ÚDA Praha between 1953 and 1956
