= 1936–37 Czechoslovak Extraliga season =

Czechoslovak ice hockey season

The 1936–37 Czechoslovak Extraliga season was the first season of the Czechoslovak Extraliga, the top level of ice hockey in Czechoslovakia. Eight teams participated in the league, and LTC Prag won the championship.

== Standings ==
Pl.	Team	GP	W	T	L	GF–GA	Pts
1.	LTC Prag	7	6	1	0	64–2	13
2.	AC Sparta Prag	7	5	2	0	29–7	12
3.	AC Stadion České Budějovice	7	4	0	3	20–24	8
4.	HC Tatry Poprad	7	3	1	3	18–14	7
5.	SSK Vítkovice	7	3	1	3	14–18	7
6.	Troppauer EV Opava	7	2	1	4	10–19	5
7.	SK Slavia Prag	7	2	0	6	8–31	4
8.	BK Mladá Boleslav	7	0	0	7	6–54	0
