= 1955–56 Czechoslovak Extraliga season =

Czechoslovak ice hockey season

The 1955–56 Czechoslovak Extraliga season was the 13th season of the Czechoslovak Extraliga, the top level of ice hockey in Czechoslovakia. 15 teams participated in the league, and Ruda Hvezda Brno won the championship.

== Group A ==
Pl.	Team	GP	W	T	L	GF–GA	Pts
1.	Rudá Hvězda Brno	12	11	0	1	80:27	22
2.	Baník Vítkovice	12	9	0	3	44:36	18
3.	Tankista Prag	12	7	1	4	43:30	15
4.	Dynamo Pardubice	12	5	2	5	53:51	12
5.	Spartak ZJŠ Brno	12	4	0	8	36:51	8
6.	Spartak Královo Pole	12	3	1	8	32:46	7
7.	ÚNV Slovan Bratislava	12	1	0	11	29:76	2

== Group B ==
Pl.	Team	GP	W	T	L	GF–GA	Pts
1.	Baník Chomutov	14	12	1	1	84:33	25
2.	Spartak Praha Sokolovo	14	11	1	2	91:43	23
3.	Spartak LZ Plzeň	14	8	0	6	61:59	16
4.	ÚDA Praha	14	7	0	7	62:65	14
5.	Baník Kladno	14	6	0	8	59:59	12
6.	Motorlet Prag	14	5	0	9	68:78	10
7.	Slavoj České Budějovice	14	5	0	9	45:76	10
8.	Dynamo Karlovy Vary	14	1	0	13	49:106	2

== Final ==
Pl.	Team	GP	W	T	L	GF–GA	Pts
1.	Rudá hvězda Brno	6	5	0	1	29:12	10
2.	Baník Chomutov	6	3	1	2	22:21	7
3.	Spartak Praha Sokolovo	6	3	0	3	19:24	6
4.	Baník Vítkovice	6	0	1	5	14:27	1
