= 1956–57 Czechoslovak Extraliga season =

Czechoslovak ice hockey season

The 1956–57 Czechoslovak Extraliga season was the 14th season of the Czechoslovak Extraliga, the top level of ice hockey in Czechoslovakia. 14 teams participated in the league, and Ruda Hvezda Brno won the championship.

== Regular season ==
Pl.	Team	GP	W	T	L	GF–GA	Pts
1.	Rudá Hvězda Brno	26	19	3	4	155:54	41
2.	Spartak Praha Sokolovo	26	19	1	6	140:59	39
3.	Spartak LZ Plzeň	26	18	2	6	119:69	38
4.	Baník Vítkovice	26	16	2	8	123:99	34
5.	Baník Kladno	26	14	4	8	97:76	32
6.	ÚNV Slovan Bratislava	26	15	1	10	106:100	31
7.	Baník Chomutov	26	11	5	10	120:87	27
8.	Slavoj České Budějovice	26	10	3	13	92:96	23
9.	Dynamo Pardubice	26	9	4	13	97:101	22
10.	Motorlet Prag	26	10	2	14	94:141	22
11.	Tatra Smíchov	26	8	2	16	77:145	18
12.	Spartak Královo Pole	26	7	1	18	81:140	15
13.	Tatran Opava	26	5	3	18	76:140	13
14.	Spartak ZJŠ Brno	26	4	1	21	63:133	9

== 1. Liga-Qualification ==
Place	Team	Pts
1.	Dukla Jihlava	4
2.	Baník OKD Ostrava	3
3.	Tatra Smíchov	3
4.	Spartak Královo Pole	0
