= 1946–47 Czechoslovak Extraliga season =

Czechoslovak ice hockey season

The 1946–47 Czechoslovak Extraliga season was the fourth season of the Czechoslovak Extraliga, the top level of ice hockey in Czechoslovakia. 11 teams participated in the league, and LTC Prag won the championship.

== Regular season ==
=== Group A ===
Pl.	Team	GP	W	T	L	GF–GA	Pts
1.	LTC Prag	4	4	0	0	54:11	8
2.	ŠK Bratislava	4	3	0	1	25:26	6
3.	HC Stadion Podolí	4	2	0	2	18:23	4
4.	AC Stadion České Budějovice	4	1	0	3	15:33	2
5.	SK Libeň	4	0	0	4	13:32	0

=== Group B ===
Pl.	Team	GP	W	T	L	GF–GA	Pts
1.	I. ČLTK Prag	5	5	1	0	38:10	9
2.	VŠ Bratislava	5	3	1	1	39:18	7
3.	AC Sparta Prag	5	3	0	2	28:24	6
4.	SK Horácká Slavia Třebíč	5	3	0	2	20:20	6
5.	DSK Tábor	5	1	0	5	14:40	2
6.	HC Tatry Poprad	5	0	0	5	12:39	0

== Final ==
- LTC Prag – I. ČLTK Prag 10:0
- I. ČLTK Praha – LTC Prag 8:5
