= 1950–51 Czechoslovak Extraliga season =

Czechoslovak ice hockey season

The 1950–51 Czechoslovak Extraliga season was the eighth season of the Czechoslovak Extraliga, the top level of ice hockey in Czechoslovakia. Eight teams participated in the league, and ZSJ SKP Ceske Budejovice won the championship.

== Standings ==
Pl.	Team	GP	W	T	L	GF–GA	Pts
1.	ZSJ SKP České Budějovice	14	8	2	4	62:54	18
2.	ZSJ Vítkovické železárny	14	8	1	5	73:45	17
3.	ZSJ GZ Královo Pole	14	7	3	4	73:63	17
4.	ATK Praha	14	6	2	6	64:70	14
5.	Sokol NV Bratislava	14	6	2	6	61:75	14
6.	ZSJ ČSSZ Prostějov	14	5	2	7	58:56	12
7.	ZSJ OD Prag	14	5	2	7	65:65	12
8.	ZSJ Slavia Pardubice	14	3	2	9	43:71	8
