= 1951–52 Czechoslovak Extraliga season =

Czechoslovak ice hockey season

The 1951–52 Czechoslovak Extraliga season was the ninth season of the Czechoslovak Extraliga, the top level of ice hockey in Czechoslovakia. 18 teams participated in the league, and ZSJ Vitkovicke zelezamy won the championship.

== Group A ==
Pl.	Team	GP	W	T	L	GF–GA	Pts
1.	ZSJ Hutě Chomutov	10	9	0	1	68:30	18
2.	ZSJ Sparta ČKD Sokolovo Prag	10	7	0	3	59:33	14
3.	ZSJ SKP České Budějovice	10	5	1	4	43:39	11
4.	ZSJ Škodovka Plzeň	10	4	0	6	41:59	8
5.	ZSJ Slavia Karlovy Vary	10	2	2	6	36:58	6
6.	ZSJ SONP Kladno	10	1	1	8	25:53	3

== Group B ==
Pl.	Team	GP	W	T	L	GF–GA	Pts
1.	ZSJ Zbrojovka Brno	10	6	3	1	53:31	15
2.	ZSJ Tatra Smíchov	10	6	2	2	40:30	14
3.	ZSJ ČSSZ Prostějov	10	5	3	2	38:28	13
4.	ZSJ GZ Královo Pole	10	5	0	5	56:35	10
5.	ZSJ Slavia Pardubice	10	0	4	6	31:56	4
6.	ZSJ Šverma Jinonice	10	2	0	8	23:61	4

== Group C ==
Pl.	Team	GP	W	T	L	GF–GA	Pts
1.	ATK Praha	10	9	0	1	80:12	18
2.	ZSJ Vítkovické železárny	10	8	0	2	100:22	16
3.	ZJ Sokol NV Bratislava	10	6	1	3	66:51	13
4.	ZSJ Tatranské píly Poprad	10	3	0	7	39:59	6
5.	ZSJ KP Opava	10	2	1	7	25:76	5
6.	ZSJ Slovena Žilina	10	1	0	9	28:118	2

== Final round ==
Pl.	Team	GP	W	T	L	GF–GA	Pts
1.	ZSJ Vítkovické železárny	5	4	0	1	28:12	8
2.	ATK Praha	5	3	2	0	21:15	8
3.	ZSJ Tatra Smíchov	5	2	1	2	17:25	5
4.	ZSJ Zbrojovka Brno	5	1	2	2	19:16	4
5.	ZSJ Sparta ČKD Sokolovo Prag	5	2	0	3	20:19	4
6.	ZSJ Hutě Chomutov	5	0	1	4	9:27	1
