= 1949–50 Czechoslovak Extraliga season =

Ice hockey season in Czechoslovakia

The 1949–50 Czechoslovak Extraliga season was the seventh season of the Czechoslovak Extraliga, the top level of ice hockey in Czechoslovakia. Eight teams participated in the league, and ATK Praha won the championship.

== Standings ==
Pl.	Team	GP	W	T	L	GF–GA	Pts
1.	ATK Praha	14	12	0	2	85:45	24
2.	ZSJ Vítkovické železárny	14	10	0	4	71:43	20
3.	ZSJ Zdar LTC Praha	14	9	1	4	88:49	19
4.	AZJ OD České Budějovice	14	7	1	6	60:53	15
5.	ZSJ GZ Královo Pole	14	5	4	5	53:70	14
6.	ZSJ Sokol NV Bratislava	14	4	2	8	55:78	10
7.	ZSJ Bratrství Sparta Praha	14	1	3	10	42:76	5
8.	ZSJ Zbrojovka Brno Židenice	14	2	1	11	35:75	5

== 1. Liga-Qualification ==
Place	Team	Pts
1.	ZSJ Slavia Pardubice	6
2.	ZSJ ČSSZ Prostějov	4
3.	Rovnost/Meteor České Budějovice	1
4.	Tatry Poprad	1
