= ATK Praha =

ATK Praha may refer to:

- Dukla Prague, football team competing as ATK Praha between 1948 and 1952
- HC ATK Praha, ice hockey team known under the name of ATK Praha between 1948 and 1952
