= 1962–63 Czechoslovak Extraliga season =

Czechoslovak ice hockey season

The 1962–63 Czechoslovak Extraliga season was the 20th season of the Czechoslovak Extraliga, the top level of ice hockey in Czechoslovakia. 12 teams participated in the league, and ZKL RH Brno won the championship.

== First round ==
Pl.	Team	GP	W	T	L	GF–GA	Pts
1.	ZKL RH Brno	22	20	1	1	139:41	41
2.	Slovan CHZJD Bratislava	22	12	7	3	107:62	31
3.	Spartak Praha Sokolovo	22	12	4	6	99:68	28
4.	Dukla Jihlava	22	11	6	5	100:78	28
5.	VŽKG Ostrava	22	11	5	6	74:57	27
6.	VTŽ Chomutov	22	9	3	10	94:87	21
7.	TJ SONP Kladno	22	10	1	11	92:97	21
8.	CHZ Litvínov	22	9	3	10	71:98	21
9.	TJ Spartak LZ Plzeň	22	6	4	12	58:84	16
10.	Tesla Pardubice	22	6	3	13	84:114	15
11.	ZJS Zbrojovka Spartak Brno	22	5	2	15	61:100	12
12.	Slavoj České Budějovice	22	0	3	19	52:146	3

== Final round ==
Pl.	Team	GP	W	T	L	GF–GA	Pts
1.	ZKL RH Brno	32	27	1	4	186:71	55
2.	Spartak Praha Sokolovo	32	19	4	9	139:95	42
3.	Slovan CHZJD Bratislava	32	17	7	8	141:95	41
4.	Dukla Jihlava	32	17	6	9	135:112	40
5.	VŽKG Ostrava	32	14	5	13	105:97	33
6.	VTŽ Chomutov	32	11	3	18	120:135	25

== 7th–12th place ==
Pl.	Team	GP	W	T	L	GF–GA	Pts
7.	CHZ Litvínov	32	14	3	15	115:137	31
8.	TJ SONP Kladno	32	14	2	16	137:146	30
9.	Tesla Pardubice	32	13	4	15	130:144	30
10.	TJ Spartak LZ Plzeň	32	12	5	15	102:110	29
11.	ZJS Zbrojovka Spartak Brno	32	11	2	19	96:142	24
12.	Slavoj České Budějovice	32	0	4	28	82:204	4
