= 1961–62 Czechoslovak Extraliga season =

Czechoslovak ice hockey season

The 1961–62 Czechoslovak Extraliga season was the 19th season of the Czechoslovak Extraliga, the top level of ice hockey in Czechoslovakia. 12 teams participated in the league, and Ruda Hvezda Brno won the championship.

== First round ==
Pl.	Team	GP	W	T	L	GF–GA	Pts
1.	Slovan ÚNV Bratislava	22	16	3	3	119:58	35
2.	Rudá Hvězda Brno	22	16	2	4	129:65	34
3.	Spartak Praha Sokolovo	22	14	2	6	98:57	30
4.	Dukla Jihlava	22	14	1	7	90:80	29
5.	Tesla Pardubice	22	10	3	9	93:91	23
6.	TJ Spartak LZ Plzeň	22	10	3	9	74:78	23
7.	VŽKG Ostrava	22	9	4	9	80:75	22
8.	TJ SONP Kladno	22	8	3	11	97:112	19
9.	VTŽ Chomutov	22	8	0	14	73:111	16
10.	Dukla Litoměřice	22	5	2	15	84:132	12
11.	SZ Litvínov	22	3	5	14	80:113	11
12.	Slavoj České Budějovice	22	3	4	15	82:135	10

== Final round ==
Pl.	Team	GP	W	T	L	GF–GA	Pts
1.	Rudá Hvězda Brno	32	24	3	5	183:91	51
2.	Slovan ÚNV Bratislava	32	22	5	5	161:83	49
3.	Dukla Jihlava	32	20	3	9	136:115	43
4.	Spartak Praha Sokolovo	32	18	2	12	123:98	38
5.	TJ Spartak LZ Plzeň	32	13	4	15	100:113	30
6.	Tesla Pardubice	32	10	3	19	118:150	23

== 7th–12th place ==
Pl.	Team	GP	W	T	L	GF–GA	Pts
7.	TJ SONP Kladno	32	17	4	11	175:148	38
8.	VŽKG Ostrava	32	11	6	15	120:114	28
9.	VTŽ Chomutov	32	12	0	20	119:171	24
10.	Slavoj České Budějovice	32	8	5	19	134:191	21
11.	SZ Litvínov	32	7	6	19	123:163	20
12.	Dukla Litoměřice	32	8	3	21	130:185	19
