= 1958–59 Czechoslovak Extraliga season =

Czechoslovak ice hockey season

The 1958–59 Czechoslovak Extraliga season was the 16th season of the Czechoslovak Extraliga, the top level of ice hockey in Czechoslovakia. 12 teams participated in the league, and TJ SONP Kladno won the championship.

== Standings ==
Pl.	Team	GP	W	T	L	GF–GA	Pts
1.	TJ SONP Kladno	22	14	3	5	97:68	31
2.	TJ Spartak LZ Plzeň	22	13	1	8	109:81	27
3.	Rudá Hvězda Brno	22	11	5	6	95:67	27
4.	Spartak Praha Sokolovo	22	10	5	7	93:77	25
5.	TJ Dynamo Pardubice	22	10	5	7	90:77	25
6.	VŽKG Ostrava	22	10	4	8	79:74	24
7.	Dukla Jihlava	22	10	3	9	100:84	23
8.	Slovan ÚNV Bratislava	22	9	4	9	80:75	22
9.	VTŽ Chomutov	22	8	5	9	72:87	21
10.	TJ Spartak ZJŠ Brno	22	7	3	12	50:78	17
11.	TJ Slavoj České Budějovice	22	4	3	15	50:97	11
12.	TJ Spartak GZ Královo Pole	22	4	3	15	62:112	11
