= 1952–53 Czechoslovak Extraliga season =

Czechoslovak ice hockey season

The 1952–53 Czechoslovak Extraliga season was the 10th season of the Czechoslovak Extraliga, the top level of ice hockey in Czechoslovakia. 21 teams participated in the league, and TJ Spartak Praha Sokolovo won the championship.

== Group A ==
Pl.	Team	GP	W	T	L	GF–GA	Pts
1.	ZSJ Sparta ČKD Sokolovo Prag	12	11	0	1	89:27	22
2.	ZSJ Hutě Chomutov	12	10	0	2	100:38	20
3.	ATK Praha	12	7	1	4	78:39	15
4.	ZSJ Slavia Karlovy Vary	12	5	1	6	68:61	11
5.	ZSJ ZVIL Plzeň	12	4	1	7	46:70	9
6.	ZSJ TOS Holoubkov	12	3	0	9	61:86	6
7.	ZSJ SONP Kladno	12	0	1	11	11:132	1

== Group B ==
Pl.	Team	GP	W	T	L	GF–GA	Pts
1.	ZSJ SKP České Budějovice	12	10	0	2	83:41	20
2.	ZSJ GZ Královo Pole	12	8	1	3	85:55	17
3.	ZSJ Zbrojovka Brno	12	7	0	5	72:45	14
4.	ZSJ Slavia Pardubice	12	5	3	4	47:52	13
5.	ZSJ Tatra Smíchov	12	5	1	6	51:69	11
6.	ZSJ Motorlet Prag	12	2	2	8	38:70	6
7.	ZSJ ČSSZ Prostějov	12	1	1	10	35:79	3

== Group C ==
Pl.	Team	GP	W	T	L	GF–GA	Pts
1.	ZSJ Vítkovické železárny	12	11	1	0	100:21	23
2.	ZSJ OKD Ostrava	12	10	0	2	90:59	20
3.	Křídla vlasti Olomouc	12	6	2	4	92:48	14
4.	ZSJ Tatranské píly Poprad	12	6	0	6	74:67	12
5.	ZSJ NV Bratislava	12	5	1	6	76:51	11
6.	ZSJ KP Opava	12	2	0	10	35:109	4
7.	ZSJ Slovena Žilina	12	0	0	12	11:123	0

== 7th–12th place ==
Pl.	Team	GP	W	T	L	GF–GA	Pts
7.	ZSJ Zbrojovka Brno	5	4	1	0	28:11	9
8.	ZSJ Slavia Karlovy Vary	5	2	2	1	31:15	6
9.	Křídla vlasti Olomouc	5	3	0	2	26:19	6
10.	ATK Praha	5	2	1	2	22:18	5
11.	ZSJ Slavia Pardubice	5	2	0	3	18:22	4
12.	ZSJ Tatranské píly Poprad	5	0	0	5	11:51	0

== Final ==
Pl.	Team	GP	W	T	L	GF–GA	Pts
1.	ZSJ Sparta ČKD Sokolovo Prag	5	4	1	0	25:16	8
2.	ZSJ Vítkovické železárny	5	3	0	2	27:17	6
3.	ZSJ SKP České Budějovice	5	2	2	1	29:21	6
4.	ZSJ Hutě Chomutov	5	2	0	3	21:23	4
5.	ZSJ OKD Ostrava	5	1	2	2	23:33	4
6.	ZSJ GZ Královo Pole	5	0	1	4	21:33	1
