= Jindřich Abdul =

Czech ice hockey player

- Born: 1 February 1996 (age 29); Vsetín, Czech Republic
- Height: 185 cm (6 ft 1 in)
- Weight: 75 kg (165 lb; 11 st 11 lb)
- Position: Right wing
- Shoots: Left
- ELH team Former teams: HC Litvínov; Orli Znojmo; HK Poprad; HC Slovan Bratislava; Severstal Cherepovets; Motor České Budějovice
- Playing career: 2014–present

Jindřich Abdul (born 1 February 1996) is a Czech professional ice hockey player who currently plays professionally for HC Vítkovice Ridera of the Czech Extraliga (ELH).

He previously played for HK Poprad and HC Slovan Bratislava of the Slovak Extraliga.

== Career statistics ==
Bold indicates led league

			Regular season					Playoffs
Season	Team	League	GP	G	A	Pts	PIM	GP	G	A	Pts	PIM
2014–15	Orli Znojmo	EBEL	32	4	3	7	2	—	—	—	—	—
2015–16	Orli Znojmo	EBEL	1	0	0	0	0	—	—	—	—	—
2015–16	SK Horácká Slavia Třebíč	Czech.1	4	0	0	0	0	—	—	—	—	—
2015–16	VHK Vsetín	Czech.2	28	10	18	28	18	—	—	—	—	—
2016–17	VHK Vsetín	Czech.2	6	0	1	1	2	—	—	—	—	—
2016–17	HC Prešov	Slovak.1	23	16	26	42	6	7	6	7	13	27
2017–18	HK Poprad	Slovak	51	14	12	26	49	4	0	0	0	0
2018–19	HK Poprad	Slovak	51	6	22	28	6	12	5	2	7	4
2019–20	HC Slovan Bratislava	Slovak	53	23	39	**62**	58	—	—	—	—	—
2020–21	Severstal Cherepovets	KHL	10	2	1	3	2	2	1	1	2	0
2021–22	Motor České Budějovice	ELH	48	11	19	30	6	8	2	2	4	6
Slovak totals			155	43	73	116	113	16	5	2	7	4
KHL totals			10	2	1	3	2	2	1	1	2	0
ELH totals			48	11	19	30	6	8	2	2	4	6
