= HC Kometa Brno =

- City: Brno, Czech Republic
- League: Czech Extraliga
- Founded: 1953
- Home arena: Winning Group Arena (capacity: 7,700)
- Colours: Blue, white
- Owner: Libor Zábranský
- Head coach: Libor Zábranský
- Captain: Jakub Flek
- Affiliates: SK Horácká Slavia Třebíč
- Website: www.hc-kometa.cz

Hockey Club Kometa Brno ("Comet Brno" in English) is a professional ice hockey team based in Brno, Czech Republic. They play in the Czech Extraliga. Kometa is the most successful ice hockey club in the Czech Republic with 14 Czechoslovak (and Czech) league championship titles. Holding three European Cup titles, Kometa ranks as the most successful Czech club in international ice hockey. The team HC Kometa Brno has won three Czech Extraliga championships, capturing the title back-to-back in 2016–17 and 2017–18, and for a third time in 2024–25, so therefore, the club is also the current champion (2025) of the Czech Republic.

== History ==
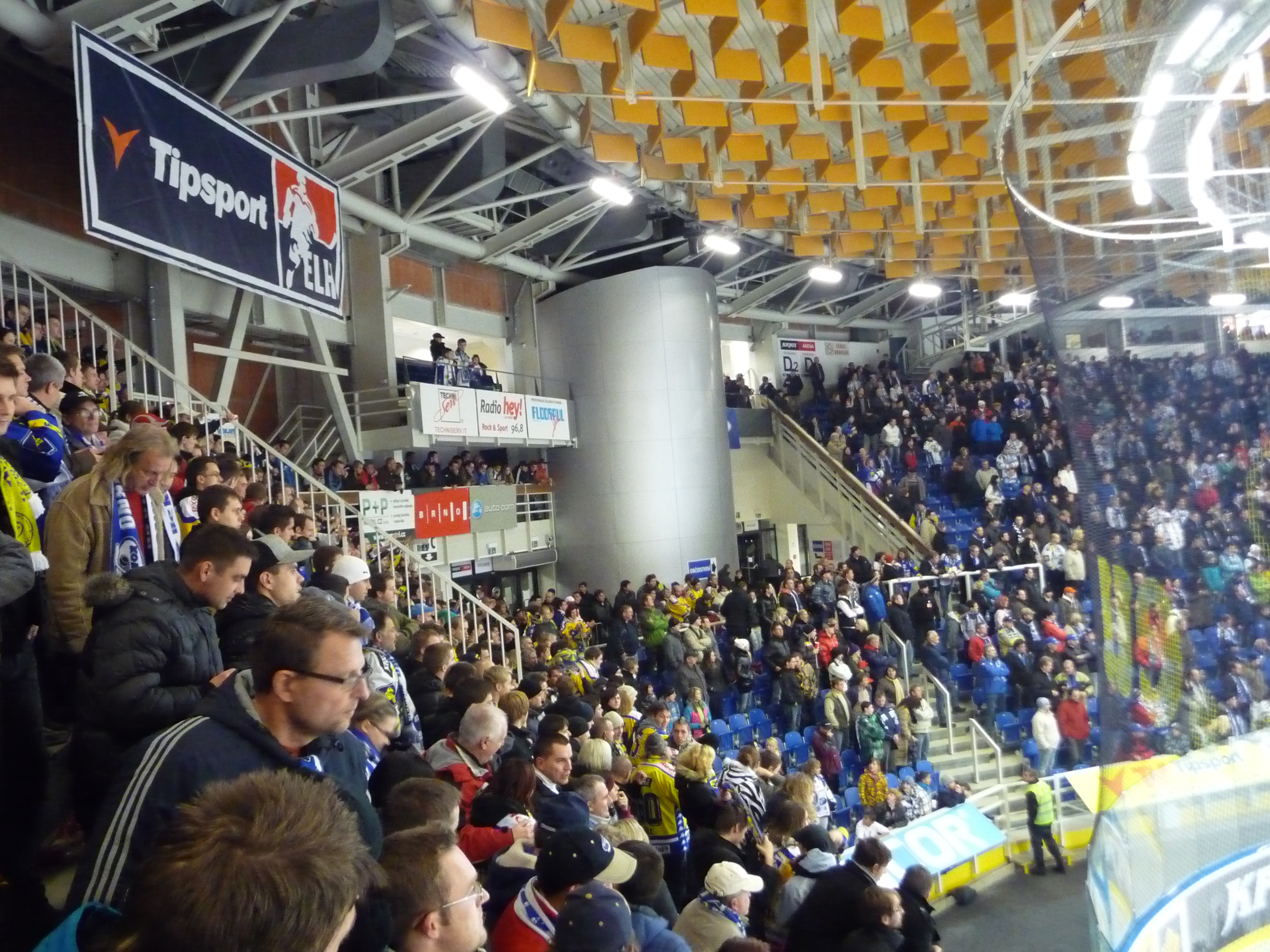
Auditorium PSG Zlín match, 29 November 2011

The club was founded in 1953 as an army ice hockey club with the name Rudá hvězda Brno ("Red Star"). The majority of players were transferred from two hockey clubs in Brno (TJ Spartak Brno Zbrojovka and TJ Spartak GZ Královo Pole). In 1962, the club changed its name to ZKL Brno (ZKL is an abbreviation of "Ball Bearing Factory") and stopped being an army team. In 1976, the name was changed to Zetor Brno. Shortly after the revolution (1994), the club changed its name to HC Kometa Brno. "Kometa" was the team's nickname since the 1950s (as opposed to the official "Red Star") and the team was commonly referred to by this name since its beginning.

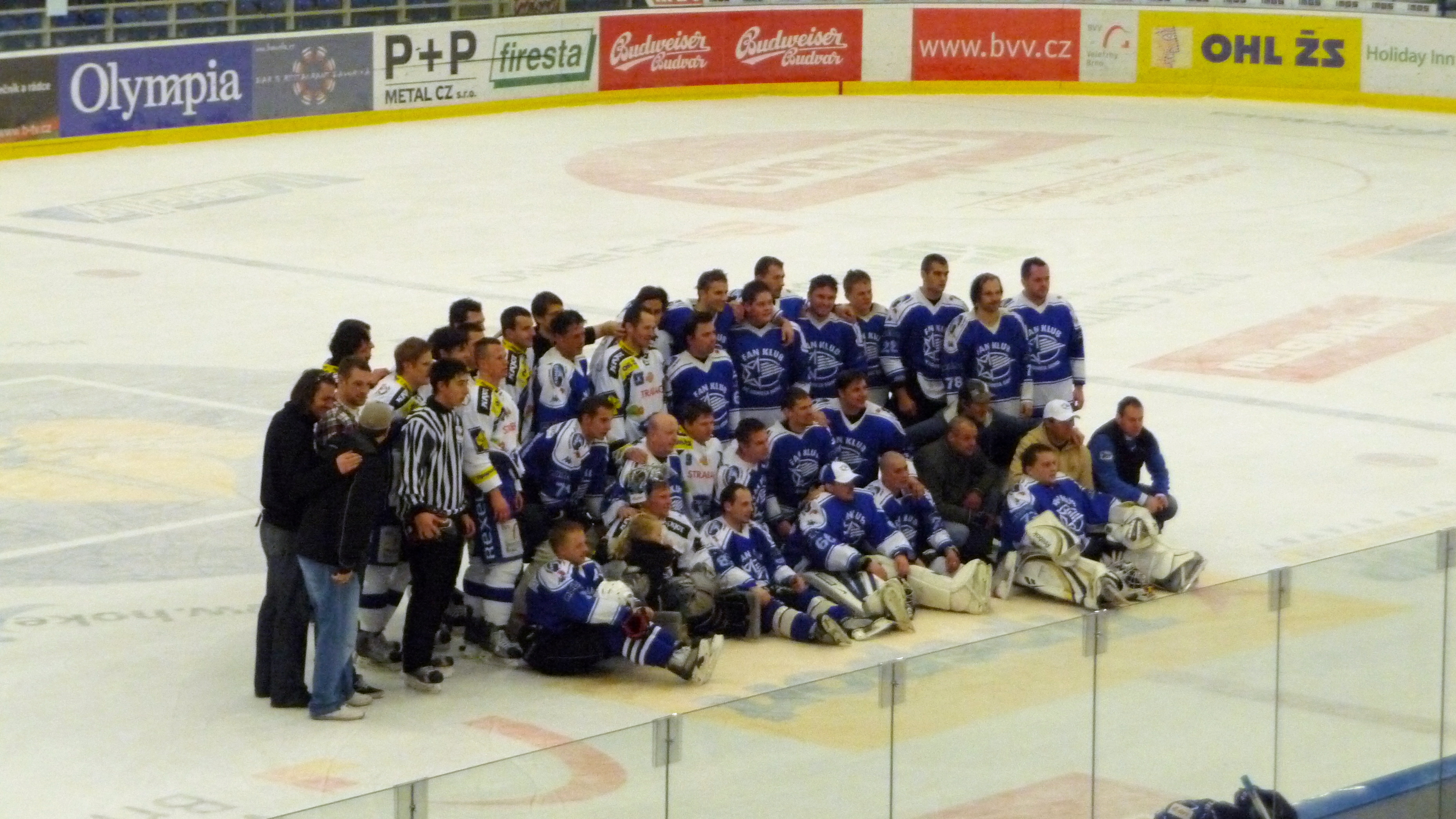
Players and fans of Kometa during 2011 post-season friendly match

In 1996, the team was relegated from Czech Extraliga to the second highest ice hockey league, the 1st Czech Republic Hockey League. For many years, the team struggled due to poor financing and multiple changes of owners, facing relegation again in 2001–2002. The club almost ceased to exist, playing in the East division of the third-highest Czech ice hockey league. By the 2003–2004 season, it returned to the first league. In 2004, Kometa played its first playoff series since 1997, reached the semifinals in 2008, and reached the finals in 2009.

On 1 April 2009, Kometa bought the licence for another South Moravian club, HC Znojemští Orli. This club began to serve as a farm team for Brno.

In March 2012, the team managed to defeat HC Sparta Praha, the winner of the 2011–12 Czech Extraliga regular season, in six games, qualifying for the playoff semifinals. In the semifinals, they defeated HC Plzeň 1929, the runner-up of the regular season, in five games. In the final, Kometa lost the Czech Extraliga championship final to HC Pardubice in six games.

== The name ==
The club's name has been formally Kometa for 31 years. In reality, however, it is much older. It has existed as an informal, yet completely dominant, automatic name used by fans, rivals, the general public, public authorities including those responsible for sports and the media since at least the mid-1960s. Formally used names: ZKL or Zetor are synonyms of the same entity, which was the tractor manufacturer ZETOR. This company was an investor in the club between 1962 and 1992. Even at this time, only the name KOMETA was used in public (albeit informally, but without reservation)

== Team culture ==
=== Transport and traveling ===
Traveling to the opponent's stadium was not easy at all in the early days (in the 1950s). Although Czechoslovakia was not a large country, it was still too small for frequent air connections and, in addition, the otherwise dense railway network, damaged by the war, was not maintained. The road network was even worse. Every trip to the rival's ice was tiring for the team. Only a few fans could afford it. Only over time, the situation improved and was adjusted by the development of the highway network.

=== Kometa Expres: The Club train ===
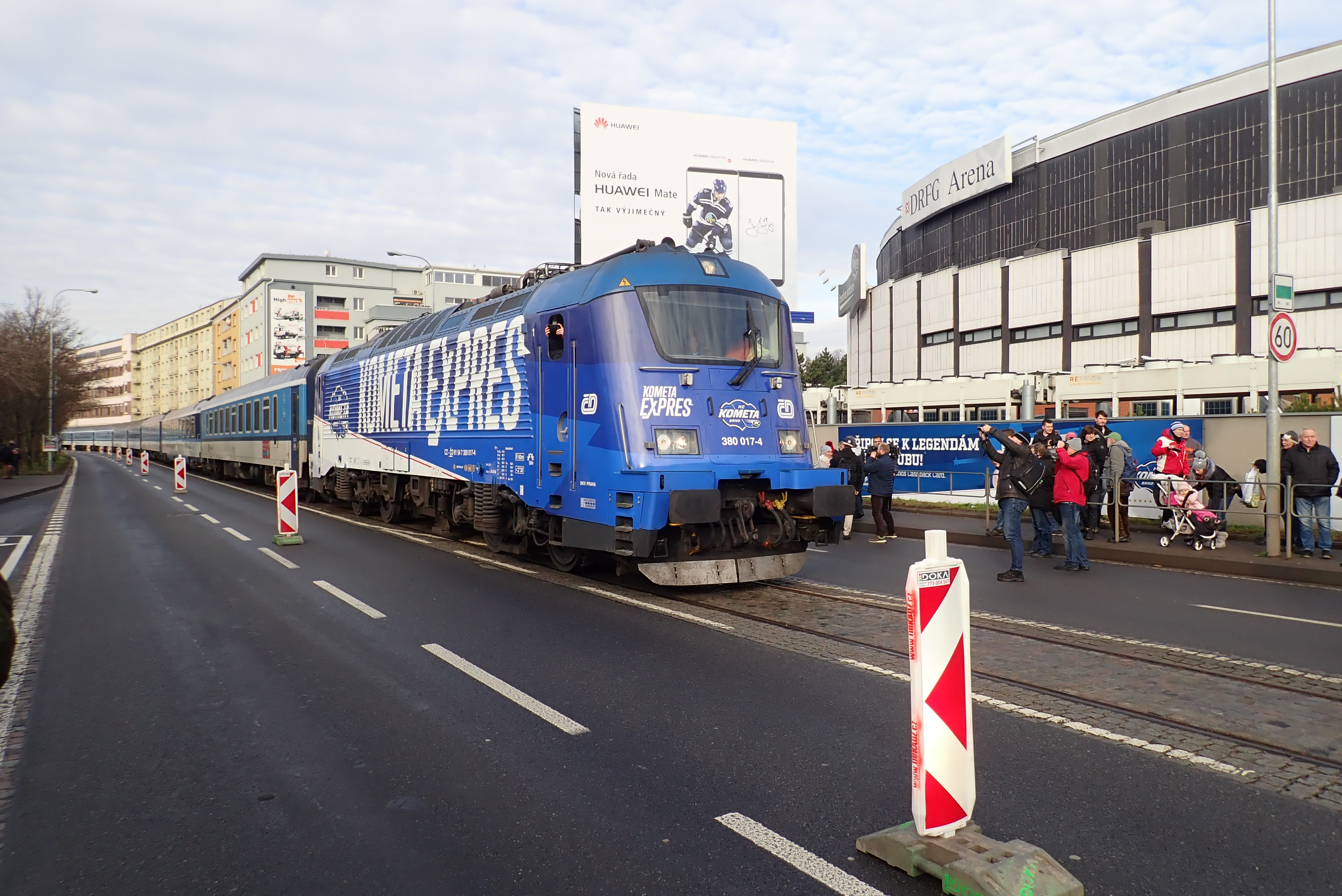
Kometa Expres ready dock for hundreds of fans in front of the main entrance of Winning Group Arena.

A regular railway connection runs around the home arena. It is a traditional railway siding (to the Brno Exhibition Center), regularly connected to the general railway network.

== Players ==
=== Current roster ===
As of 19 June 2025.Source: eliteprospects.com

No.	Nat	Player	Pos	S/G	Age	Acquired	Birthplace
7	(Czech Republic)	Tomáš Bartejs	D	L	34	2024	Třebíč, Czech Republic
21	(Czech Republic)	Adam Boltvan	LW	L	22	2022	Břeclav, Czech Republic
6	(Slovakia)	Lukáš Cingel	C	L	34	2023	Žilina, Czechoslovakia
8	(Slovakia)	Marek Ďaloga	D	L	37	2021	Zvolen, Czechoslovakia
10	(Czech Republic)	Jan Ekrt	C	R	22	2023	Louny, Czech Republic
9	(Czech Republic)	Jakub Flek (C)	LW	L	33	2022	Mariánské Lázně, Czechoslovakia
24	(Czech Republic)	Michal Gulaši (A)	D	L	40	2024	Ostrava, Czechoslovakia
93	(Canada)	Rhett Holland	D	R	33	2020	Calgary, Alberta, Canada
75	(Finland)	Arttu Ilomäki	C	R	35	2024	Tampere, Finland
1	(Czech Republic)	Jan Kavan	G	R	21	2023	Hodonín, Czech Republic
72	(Slovakia)	Andrej Kollár	C	R	27	2021	Nitra, Slovakia
15	(Czech Republic)	Jakub Kos	LW	L	23	2023	Kuřim, Czech Republic
37	(Slovenia)	Gašper Krošelj	G	L	39	2024	Ljubljana, Yugoslavia
82	(Czech Republic)	Filip Král	D	L	27	2025	Blansko, Czech Republic
89	(United States)	Peter Mueller (A)	RW	R	38	2024	Bloomington, Minnesota, United States
2	(Czech Republic)	Jan Ondráček	G	R	20	2025	Šumperk, Czech Republic
22	(Slovakia)	Kristián Pospíšil	LW	L	30	2022	Zvolen, Slovakia
30	(Czech Republic)	Aleš Stezka	G	L	29	2025	Plzeň, Czech Republic
83	(Czech Republic)	Šimon Stránský	LW	L	28	2024	Ostrava, Czech Republic
13	(Czech Republic)	Denis Svoboda	D	L	21	2024	Brno, Czech Republic
23	(Czech Republic)	Jan Ščotka (A)	D	L	30	2022	Vsetín, Czech Republic
28	(Czech Republic)	Libor Zábranský	D	R	26	2024	Brno, Czech Republic
18	(Czech Republic)	Adam Zbořil	C	L	31	2021	Brno, Czech Republic
20	(Czech Republic)	Hynek Zohorna	RW	R	36	2024	Havlíčkův Brod, Czechoslovakia
79	(Czech Republic)	Tomáš Zohorna	C	L	38	2025	Havlíčkův Brod, Czechoslovakia

== Head coaches ==
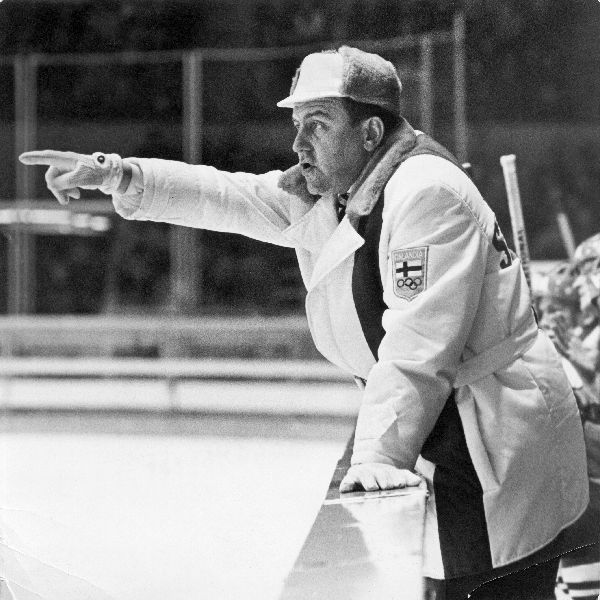
CoachGustav Bubník earlier as a head coach Finland men's national ice hockey team 1968

- Vlastimil Bubník, 1953–1955
- Vladimír Bouzek, 1955–1958
- Eduard Farda, 1958–1959
- Vladimír Bouzek, 1961–1966
- František Vaněk, 1967–1970
- Bronislav Danda, 1970–1973
- Augustin Bubník, 1977–1978
- Jozef Golonka, 1979–1980
- Jaroslav Jiřík, 1980–1981
- František Vaněk, 1982–1985
- Vlastimil Bubník, 1991–1994
- Alois Hadamczik, 2015–2016
- Libor Zábranský, 2016–1019
- Kamil Pokorný, 2024–present

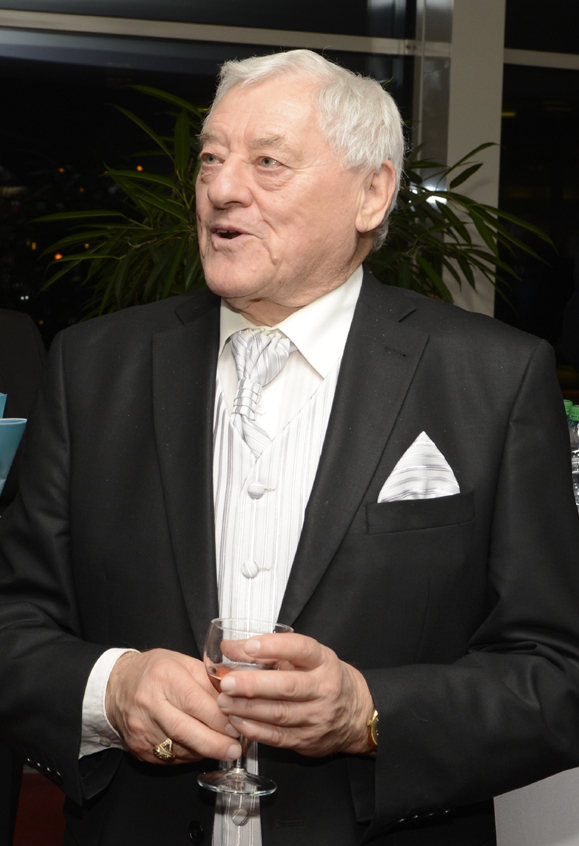
Coach since 1979 Jozef Golonka in White tie 2015

== Honours ==
=== Domestic ===
Czech Extraliga

- (gold) Winners (3): 2016–17, 2017–18, 2024–25
- (silver) Runners-up (2): 2011–12, 2013–14
- (bronze) 3rd place (1): 2014–15

Czech 1. Liga

- (gold) Winners (1): 1994–95
- (silver) Runners-up (1): 2008–09
- (bronze) 3rd place (1): 1993–94

Czechoslovak Extraliga

- (gold) Winners (11): 1954–55, 1955–56, 1956–57, 1957–58, 1959–60, 1960–61, 1961–62, 1962–63, 1963–64, 1964–65, 1965–66
- (silver) Runners-up (4): 1953–54, 1967–68, 1968–69, 1970–71
- (bronze) 3rd place (3): 1958–59, 1966–67, 1969–70

1st. Czech National Hockey League

- (gold) Winners (3): 1980–81, 1988–89, 1990–91
- (bronze) 3rd place (1): 1992–93

=== International ===
IIHF European Cup

- (gold) Winners (3): 1965–66, 1966–67, 1967–68

=== Pre-season ===
Spengler Cup

- (gold) Winners (1): 1955
- (silver) Runners-up (1): 1957

Rona Cup

- (gold) Winners (1): 2014

Tipsport Hockey Cup

- (gold) Winners (1): 2008

== History of the team name ==
- 1953 – Rudá hvězda Brno
- 1962 – TJ ZKL Brno
- 1976 – TJ Zetor Brno
- 1990 – HC Zetor Brno
- 1993 – HC Královopolská Brno
- 1994 – HC Kometa Brno
- 1995 – HC Kometa Brno BVV
- 1997 – HC Kometa Brno

== Gallery ==
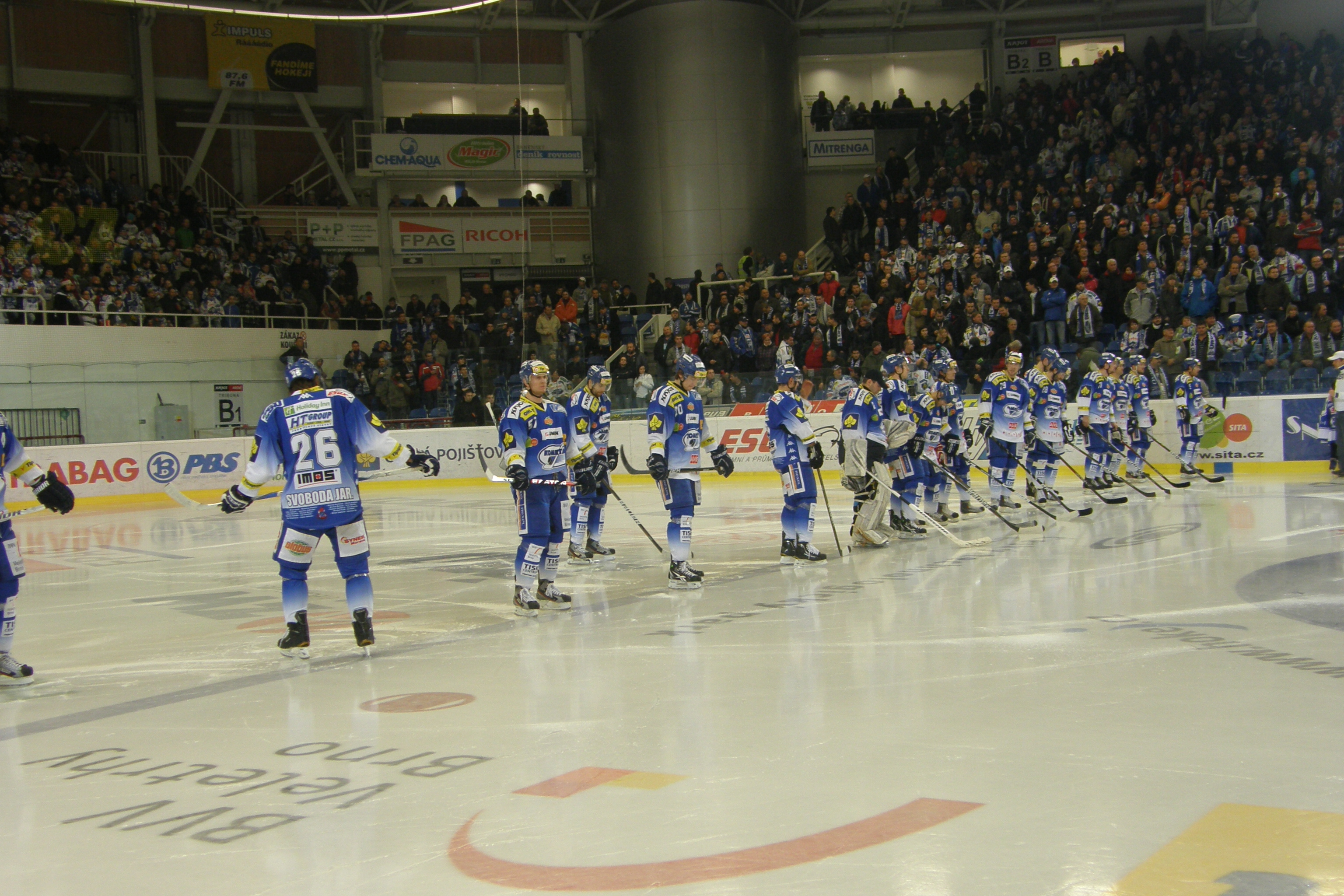
Playoff match against PSG Zlín 2011

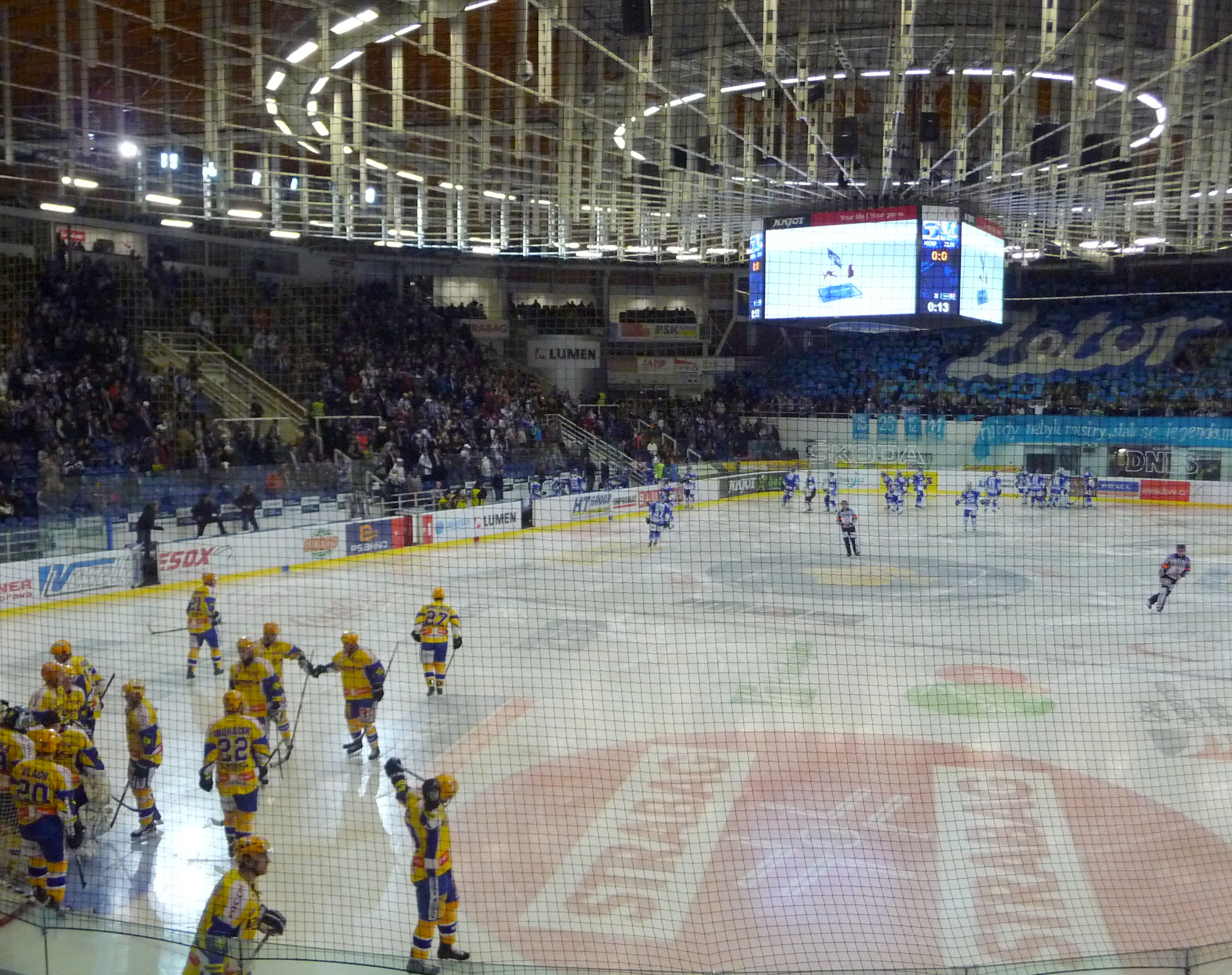
PSG Zlín match

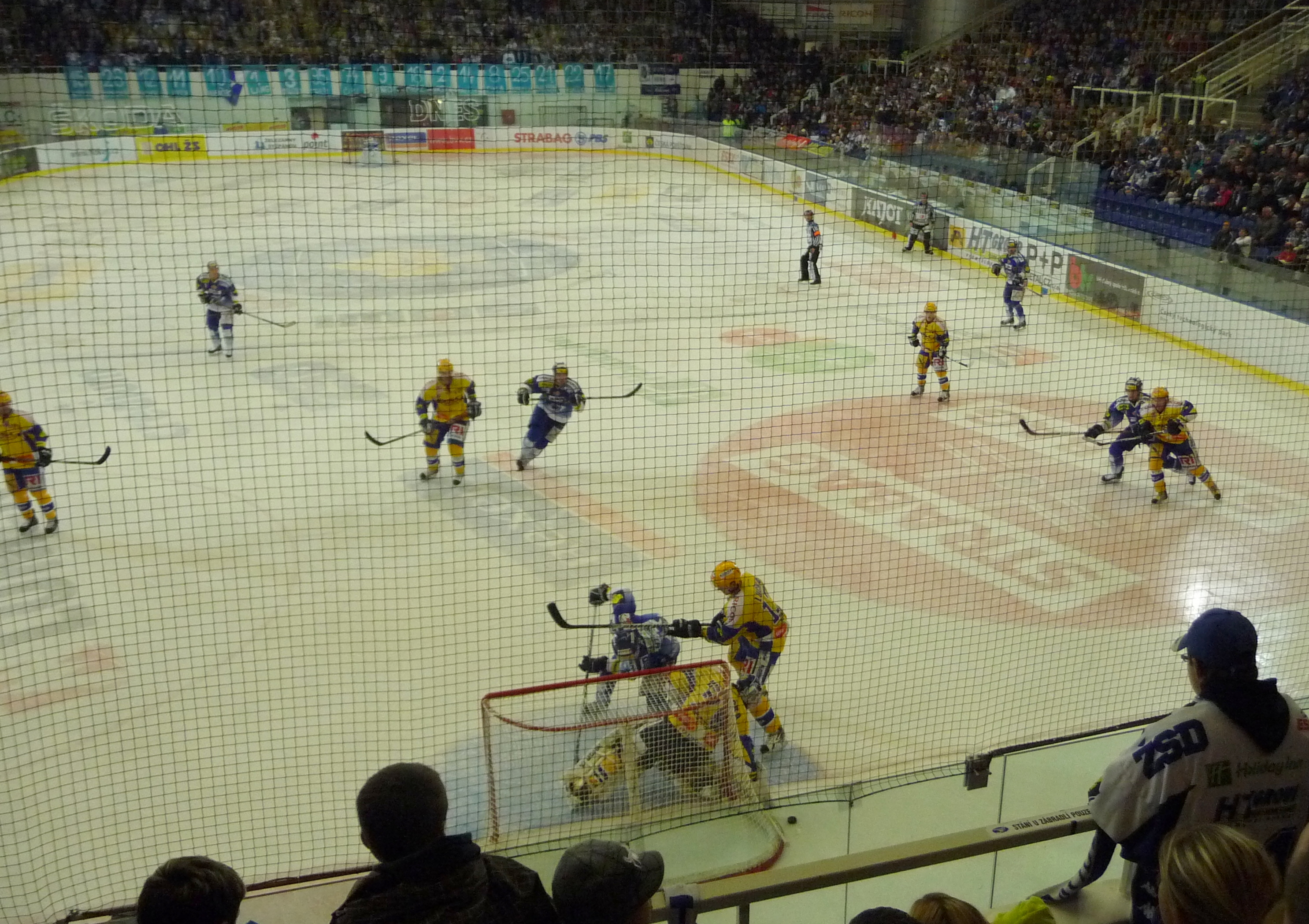
PSG ZLín full play

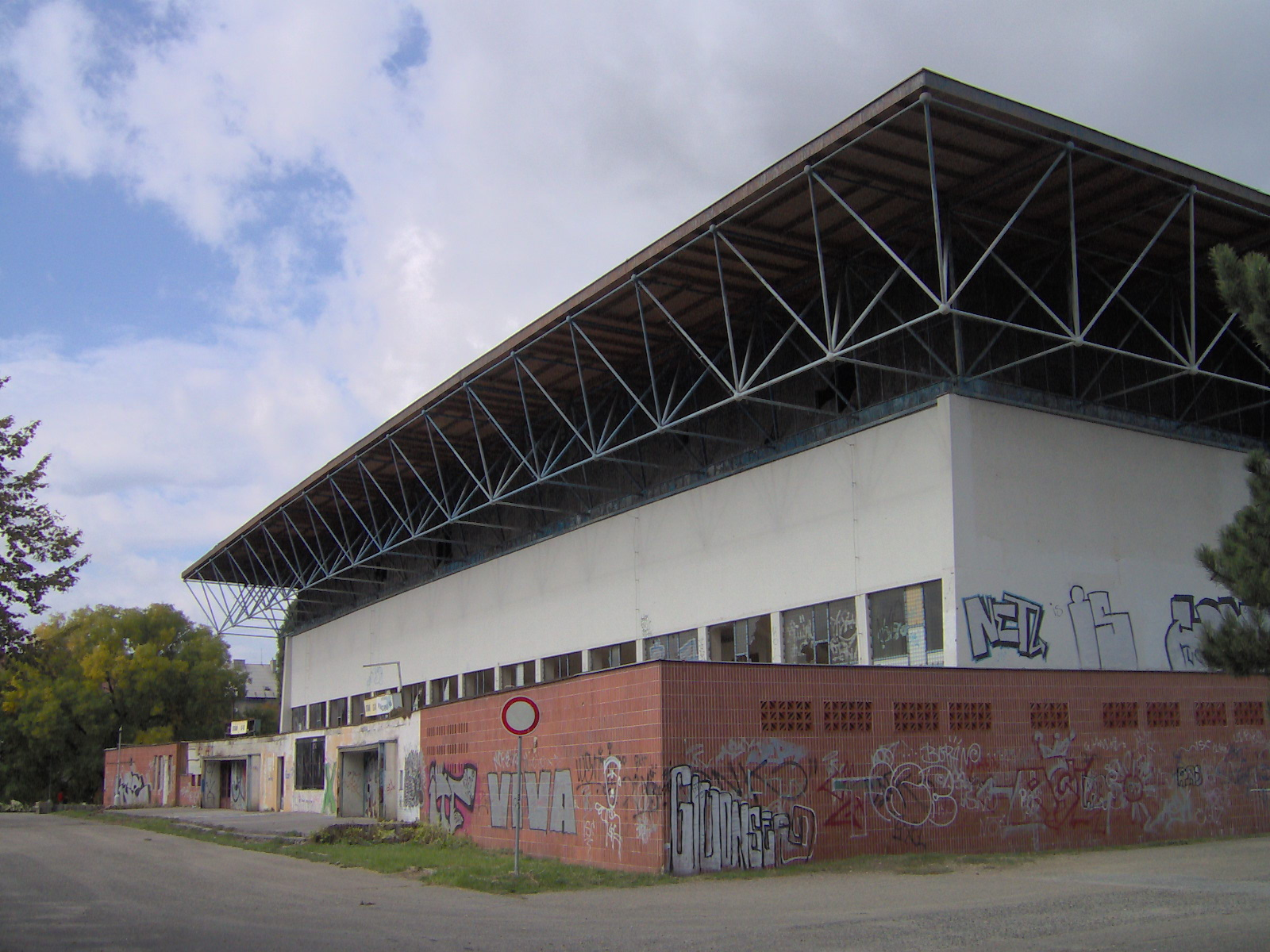
The old stadium behind Lužánky park

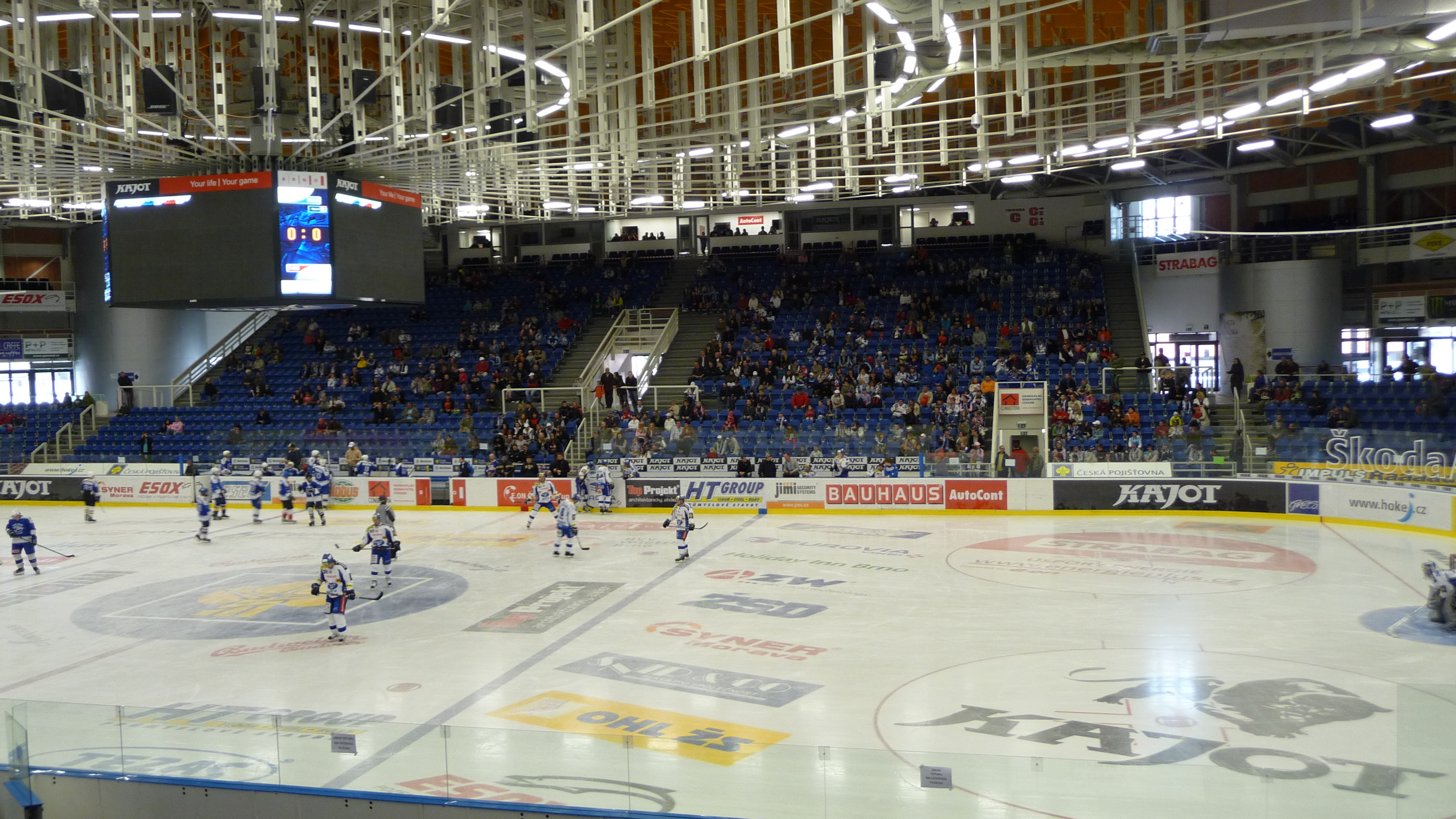
The closing of the season 2011

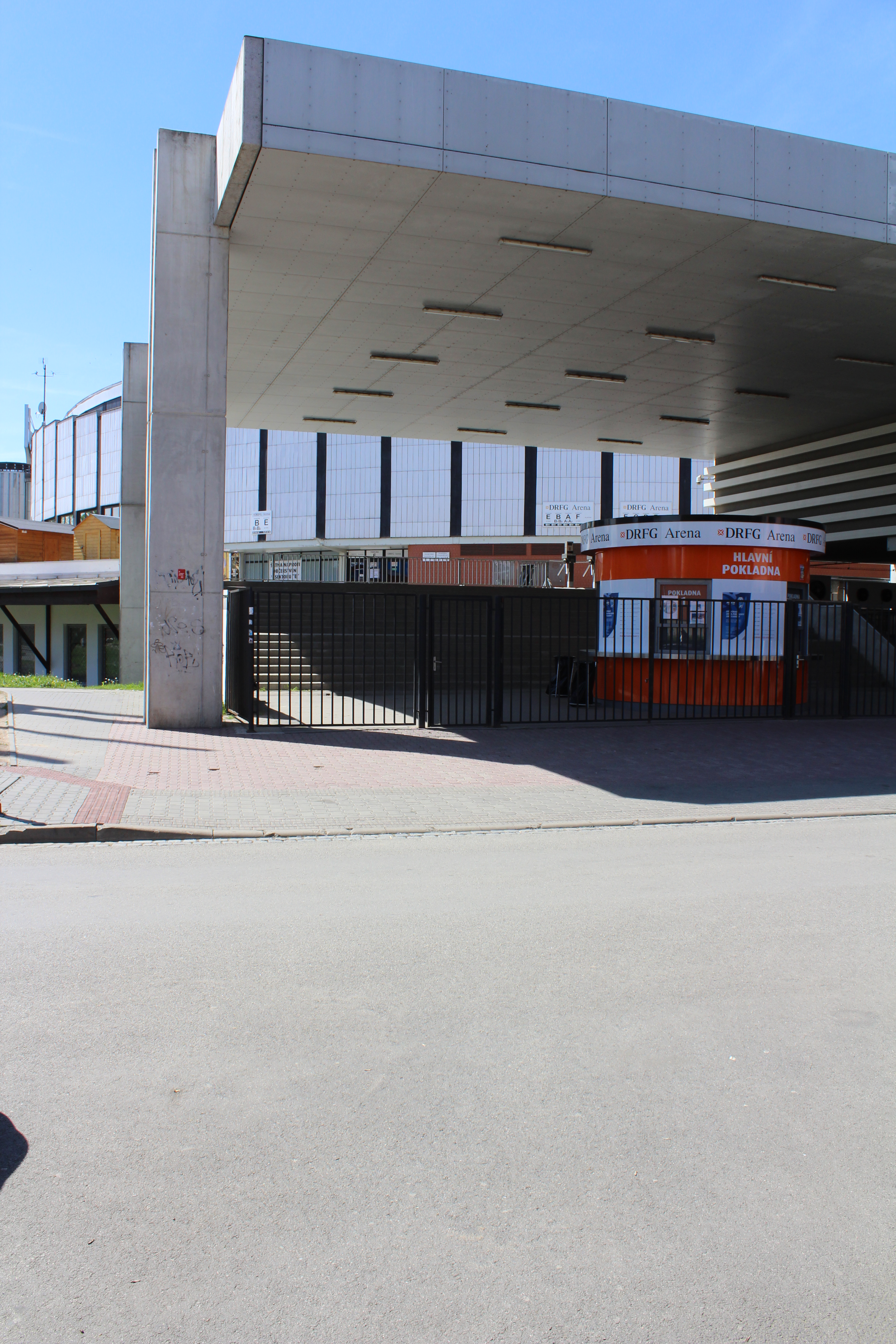
DRFG Arena - main entrance

The former logo

== See also ==
- Královo pole
- Lužánky
- Královo Pole indoor arena

== Notes ==
Preceded by Spartak Praha Sokolovo	Czechoslovak Extraliga Champions; 1954–55	Succeeded by Rudá hvězda Brno
Preceded by Rudá hvězda Brno	Czechoslovak Extraliga Champions; 1955–56	Succeeded by Rudá hvězda Brno
Preceded by Rudá hvězda Brno	Czechoslovak Extraliga Champions; 1956–57	Succeeded by Rudá hvězda Brno
Preceded by Rudá hvězda Brno	Czechoslovak Extraliga Champions; 1957–58	Succeeded by Sokol Kladno
Preceded by Sokol Kladno	Czechoslovak Extraliga Champions; 1959–60	Succeeded by Rudá hvězda Brno
Preceded by Rudá hvězda Brno	Czechoslovak Extraliga Champions; 1960–61	Succeeded by ZKL Brno
Preceded by Rudá hvězda Brno	Czechoslovak Extraliga Champions; 1961–62	Succeeded by ZKL Brno
Preceded by ZKL Brno	Czechoslovak Extraliga Champions; 1962–63	Succeeded by ZKL Brno
Preceded by ZKL Brno	Czechoslovak Extraliga Champions; 1963–64	Succeeded by ZKL Brno
Preceded by ZKL Brno	Czechoslovak Extraliga Champions; 1964–65	Succeeded by ZKL Brno
Preceded by ZKL Brno	Czechoslovak Extraliga Champions; 1965–66	Succeeded by HC Dukla Jihlava
Preceded by HC Bílí Tygři Liberec	Czech Extraliga; Champions; 2016–17	Succeeded by HC Kometa Brno
Preceded by HC Kometa Brno	Czech Extraliga; Champions; 2017–18	Succeeded by HC Oceláři Třinec
