= 1959–60 Czechoslovak Extraliga season =

Czechoslovak ice hockey season

The 1959–60 Czechoslovak Extraliga season was the 17th season of the Czechoslovak Extraliga, the top level of ice hockey in Czechoslovakia. 12 teams participated in the league, and Ruda Hvezda Brno won the championship.

== Standings ==
Pl.	Team	GP	W	T	L	GF–GA	Pts
1.	Rudá Hvězda Brno	22	19	1	2	122:46	39
2.	Slovan ÚNV Bratislava	22	16	0	6	125:79	32
3.	TJ Dynamo Pardubice	22	11	4	7	96:77	26
4.	Spartak Praha Sokolovo	22	12	1	9	89:57	25
5.	TJ SONP Kladno	22	12	1	9	105:90	25
6.	TJ Spartak LZ Plzeň	22	10	4	8	91:77	24
7.	Dukla Jihlava	22	9	5	8	91:88	23
8.	TJ Jiskra SZ Litvínov	22	10	0	12	78:115	20
9.	VTŽ Chomutov	22	7	4	11	61:76	18
10.	TJ Spartak ZJŠ Brno	22	5	4	13	54:80	14
11.	TJ VŽKG Ostrava	22	5	3	14	53:91	13
12.	TJ Slezan Opava	22	2	1	19	46:135	5
