= Valdemar Jiruš =

Czech ice hockey player and coach

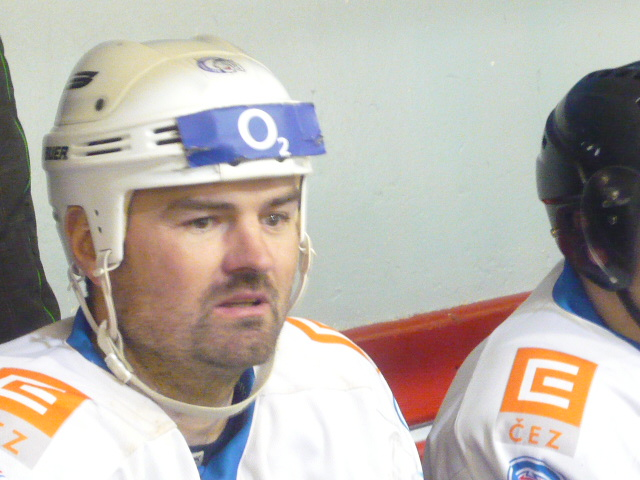
- Born: September 9, 1973 (age 52) Kolín, CS
- Height: 6 ft 3 in (191 cm)
- Weight: 211 lb (96 kg; 15 st 1 lb)
- Position: Defence
- Shot: Left
- CZE team Former teams: BK Mladá Boleslav; TJ Slovan Děčín; SK Kadaň; HC Sparta Praha; HC Liberec
- Playing career: 1994–2010

Valdemar Jiruš (born September 9, 1973, in Kolín, Czechoslovakia) is a Czech ice hockey coach and a former professional ice hockey player. He played defenceman for BK Mladá Boleslav in the Czech Extraliga in his final season. After the end of his playing career he coached the youth teams of HC Bílí Tygři Liberec. Since 2018 he has been assistant coach of HC Benátky nad Jizerou.

== Career ==
Jiruš started playing ice hockey in his hometown Kolín. Played with TJ Slovan Děčín and SK Kadaň (in the Czech First League and Czech Second League respectively) from 1994 to 2000. He spent the seasons 2001–2002 and 2002–2003 with Sparta Praha, and he won in this time the Extraliga in 2002. In 2003 Jiruš joined HC Liberec and left the club on April 25, 2009, after six-year to sign with BK Mladá Boleslav.

== Career statistics ==
			Regular season					Playoffs
Season	Team	League	GP	G	A	Pts	PIM	GP	G	A	Pts	PIM
1992–93	SC Kolín	Czech3	38	17	14	31	—	—	—	—	—	—
1994–95	HC Děčín	Czech3	—	5	4	9	—	—	—	—	—	—
1995–96	HC Děčín	Czech3	—	14	10	24	—	—	—	—	—	—
1996–97	HC Děčín	Czech3	—	8	6	14	—	—	—	—	—	—
1997–98	HC Děčín	Czech3	—	6	10	16	—	—	—	—	—	—
1998–99	HC Děčín	Czech3	—	4	15	19	—	—	—	—	—	—
1998–99	SK Kadaň	Czech2	5	1	0	1	0	—	—	—	—	—
1999–00	SK Kadan	Czech2	36	9	8	17	32	—	—	—	—	—
2000–01	Bili Tygri Liberec	Czech2	40	12	25	37	36	11	0	4	4	6
2000–01	HC Sparta Praha	Czech	—	—	—	—	—	9	0	2	2	6
2001–02	HC Sparta Praha	Czech	44	1	13	14	30	13	0	1	1	0
2002–03	HC Sparta Praha	Czech	48	7	18	25	26	10	0	0	0	4
2003–04	Bili Tygri Liberec	Czech	48	9	12	21	34	—	—	—	—	—
2004–05	Bili Tygri Liberec	Czech	51	4	10	14	38	11	0	3	3	4
2005–06	Bili Tygri Liberec	Czech	49	5	21	26	34	2	0	0	0	27
2006–07	Bili Tygri Liberec	Czech	45	11	12	23	28	6	1	2	3	4
2007–08	Bili Tygri Liberec	Czech	49	8	11	19	34	11	3	6	9	2
2008–09	Bili Tygri Liberec	Czech	47	2	21	23	54	1	0	0	0	2
2009–10	BK Mlada Boleslav	Czech	40	4	7	11	78	—	—	—	—	—
Czech totals			421	51	125	176	356	71	5	15	20	51
