= 1960–61 Czechoslovak Extraliga season =

Czechoslovak ice hockey season

The 1960–61 Czechoslovak Extraliga season was the 18th season of the Czechoslovak Extraliga, the top level of ice hockey in Czechoslovakia. 12 teams participated in the league, and Ruda Hvezda Brno won the championship.

== First round ==
Pl.	Team	GP	W	T	L	GF–GA	Pts
1.	Rudá Hvězda Brno	22	17	1	4	123:59	35
2.	Slovan ÚNV Bratislava	22	15	1	6	114:63	31
3.	Spartak Praha Sokolovo	22	11	3	8	101:73	25
4.	TJ SONP Kladno	22	10	4	8	106:84	24
5.	Tesla Pardubice	22	11	1	10	81:73	23
6.	Dukla Jihlava	22	10	3	9	86:98	23
7.	TJ Spartak LZ Plzeň	22	10	2	10	95:90	22
8.	SZ Litvínov	22	9	4	9	84:101	22
9.	Slavoj České Budějovice	22	7	5	10	69:93	19
10.	VTŽ Chomutov	22	8	2	12	76:101	18
11.	TJ Spartak ZJŠ Brno	22	7	2	13	62:78	16
12.	TJ Gottwaldov	22	2	2	18	44:138	6

== Final round ==
Pl.	Team	GP	W	T	L	GF–GA	Pts
1.	Rudá Hvězda Brno	32	22	1	9	158:94	45
2.	Slovan ÚNV Bratislava	32	20	2	10	161:108	42
3.	Spartak Praha Sokolovo	32	19	3	10	159:97	41
4.	Dukla Jihlava	32	14	4	14	123:124	32
5.	Tesla Pardubice	32	15	1	16	109:119	31
6.	TJ SONP Kladno	32	13	4	15	141:138	30

== 7th–12th place ==
Pl.	Team	GP	W	T	L	GF–GA	Pts
7.	TJ Spartak LZ Plzeň	32	18	2	12	144:117	38
8.	VTŽ Chomutov	32	14	5	13	131:128	33
9.	SZ Litvínov	32	13	4	15	124:147	30
10.	Slavoj České Budějovice	32	10	6	16	95:136	26
11.	TJ Spartak ZJŠ Brno	32	9	4	19	95:129	22
12.	TJ Gottwaldov	32	5	4	23	78:181	14
