= 1965–66 Czechoslovak Extraliga season =

Premier hockey league season in Czechoslovakia

The 1965–66 Czechoslovak Extraliga season was the 23rd season of the Czechoslovak Extraliga, the top level of ice hockey in Czechoslovakia. 10 teams participated in the league, and ZKL Brno won the championship. At the end of the season, ZKL Brno and Dukla Jihlava each had 56 points from 36 games played. ZKL Brno won by virtue of scoring six more goals and conceding two fewer goals compared to Dukla Jihlava.

== Standings ==
Pl.	Team	GP	W	T	L	GF–GA	Pts
1.	ZKL Brno	36	25	6	5	203:92	56
2.	Dukla Jihlava	36	26	4	6	197:94	56
3.	Slovan CHZJD Bratislava	36	23	6	7	191:122	52
4.	Spartak ČKD Prag	36	18	7	11	144:121	43
5.	Tesla Pardubice	36	18	4	14	174:145	40
6.	TJ SONP Kladno	36	12	3	21	145:187	27
7.	Dukla Košice	36	9	8	19	105:131	26
8.	TJ Gottwaldov	36	9	4	23	111:189	22
9.	CHZ Litvínov	36	9	2	25	104:198	20
10.	TJ Spartak LZ Plzeň	36	6	6	24	88:180	18

== 1. Liga-Qualification ==
Place	Team	Pts
1.	VŽKG Ostrava	11
2.	VTŽ Chomutov	7
3.	Motorlet Prag	4
4.	Dukla Trenčín	2
