= 1957–58 Czechoslovak Extraliga season =

Czechoslovak ice hockey season

The 1957–58 Czechoslovak Extraliga season was the 15th season of the Czechoslovak Extraliga, the top level of ice hockey in Czechoslovakia. 12 teams participated in the league, and Ruda Hvezda Brno won the championship.

== Standings ==
Pl.	Team	GP	W	T	L	GF–GA	Pts
1.	Rudá Hvězda Brno	22	16	2	4	142:57	34
2.	Spartak LZ Plzeň	22	14	1	7	106:83	29
3.	VŽKG Ostrava	22	13	1	8	103:76	27
4.	Baník Chomutov	22	13	1	8	82:71	27
5.	Baník Kladno	22	13	0	9	101:66	26
6.	Spartak Praha Sokolovo	22	12	2	8	105:71	26
7.	Dynamo Pardubice	22	12	2	8	97:84	26
8.	ÚNV Slovan Bratislava	22	10	1	11	72:76	21
9.	Dukla Jihlava	22	7	1	14	67:113	15
10.	Slavoj České Budějovice	22	6	1	15	55:106	13
11.	Motorlet Prag	22	5	2	15	68:114	12
12.	Baník OKD Ostrava	22	4	0	18	67:148	8
