= 1964–65 Czechoslovak Extraliga season =

Czechoslovak ice hockey season

The 1964–65 Czechoslovak Extraliga season was the 22nd season of the Czechoslovak Extraliga, the top level of ice hockey in Czechoslovakia. 12 teams participated in the league, and ZKL Brno won the championship.

== First round ==
Pl.	Team	GP	W	T	L	GF–GA	Pts
1.	ZKL Brno	22	18	1	3	126:46	37
2.	Spartak ČKD Prag	22	16	2	4	123:72	34
3.	Slovan CHZJD Bratislava	22	16	1	5	117:84	33
4.	Dukla Jihlava	22	14	1	7	111:54	29
5.	TJ SONP Kladno	22	11	1	10	96:113	23
6.	Tesla Pardubice	22	10	2	10	111:107	22
7.	TJ Gottwaldov	22	9	2	11	75:92	20
8.	TJ Spartak LZ Plzeň	22	9	0	13	65:97	18
9.	CHZ Litvínov	22	5	5	12	73:105	15
10.	VŽKG Ostrava	22	6	1	15	68:93	13
11.	Dukla Košice	22	4	2	16	66:113	10
12.	Motorlet Prag	22	4	2	16	60:128	10

== Final round ==
Pl.	Team	GP	W	T	L	GF–GA	Pts
1.	ZKL Brno	32	24	3	5	175:85	51
2.	Slovan CHZJD Bratislava	32	21	2	9	164:113	44
3.	Spartak ČKD Prag	32	20	3	9	162:115	43
4.	Dukla Jihlava	32	19	2	11	155:93	40
5.	Tesla Pardubice	32	15	3	14	159:153	33
6.	TJ SONP Kladno	32	13	1	18	133:171	27

== 7th–12th place ==
Pl.	Team	GP	W	T	L	GF–GA	Pts
7.	Dukla Košice	32	11	5	16	112:138	27
8.	CHZ Litvínov	32	10	7	15	112:130	27
9.	TJ Gottwaldov	32	11	5	16	113:142	27
10.	TJ Spartak LZ Plzeň	32	13	0	19	100:135	26
11.	VŽKG Ostrava	32	11	4	17	112:131	26
12.	Motorlet Prag	32	5	3	24	93:184	13

== 1. Liga-Qualification ==
Place	Team	Pts
1.	TJ Gottwaldov	15
2.	TJ Spartak LZ Plzeň	13
3.	VTŽ Chomutov	8
4.	Dukla Litoměřice	6
5.	Slezan Opava	6
6.	Jednota Žilina	0
