= Czechoslovak First Ice Hockey League =

Sports league

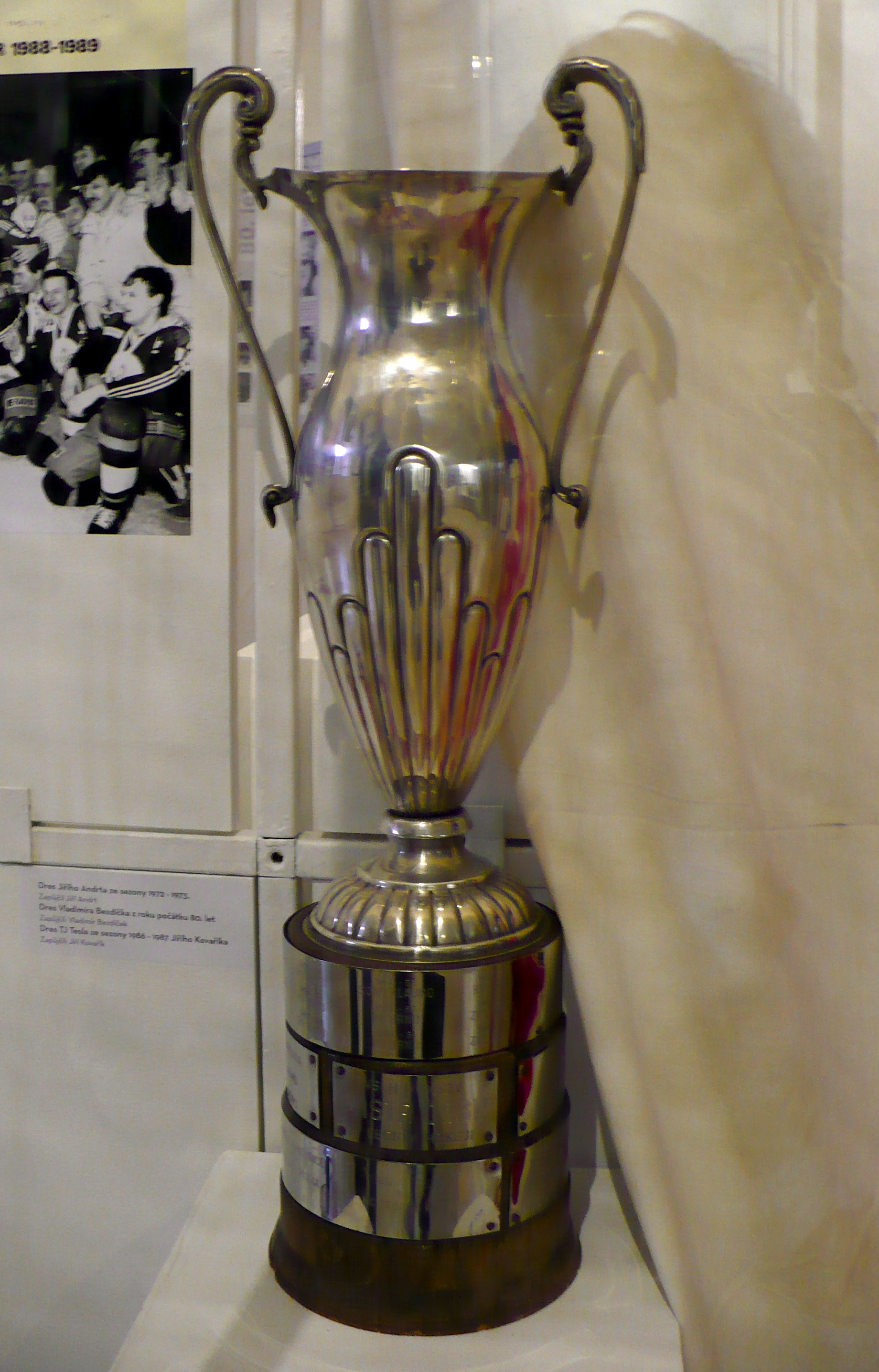
- Sport: Ice hockey
- Founded: 1936
- Folded: 1993 (reorganized as Czech Extraliga and Slovak Extraliga)
- No. of teams: 8–24
- Country: Czechoslovakia
- Last champions: HC Sparta Praha (1992–93)
- Most titles: HC Dukla Jihlava (12 titles)

The Czechoslovak First Ice Hockey League was the elite ice hockey league in Czechoslovakia from 1936 until 1993, when the country split into the Czech Republic and Slovakia. The Slovak Extraliga and Czech Extraliga formed from the split.

== History ==
The most successful team in the number of titles was HC Dukla Jihlava with 12 titles. HC Sparta Praha won the last season 1992–93, when they defeated HC Vítkovice 4–0 in the final for matches.

== Champions ==
- 1936–37 – LTC Praha
- 1937–38 – LTC Praha
- 1945–46 – LTC Praha
- 1946–47 – LTC Praha
- 1947–48 – LTC Praha
- 1948–49 – LTC Praha
- 1949–50 – HC ATK Praha
- 1950–51 – České Budějovice
- 1951–52 – Baník Vítkovice
- 1952–53 – Spartak Praha Sokolovo
- 1953–54 – Spartak Praha Sokolovo
- 1954–55 – Rudá hvězda Brno
- 1955–56 – Rudá hvězda Brno
- 1956–57 – Rudá hvězda Brno
- 1957–58 – Rudá hvězda Brno
- 1958–59 – Sokol Kladno
- 1959–60 – Rudá hvězda Brno
- 1960–61 – Rudá hvězda Brno
- 1961–62 – ZKL Brno
- 1962–63 – ZKL Brno
- 1963–64 – ZKL Brno
- 1964–65 – ZKL Brno
- 1965–66 – ZKL Brno
- 1966–67 – HC Dukla Jihlava
- 1967–68 – HC Dukla Jihlava
- 1968–69 – HC Dukla Jihlava
- 1969–70 – HC Dukla Jihlava
- 1970–71 – HC Dukla Jihlava
- 1971–72 – HC Dukla Jihlava
- 1972–73 – Tesla Pardubice
- 1973–74 – HC Dukla Jihlava
- 1974–75 – Sokol Kladno
- 1975–76 – Sokol Kladno
- 1976–77 – Poldi SONP Kladno
- 1977–78 – Poldi SONP Kladno
- 1978–79 – Slovan Bratislava
- 1979–80 – Poldi SONP Kladno
- 1980–81 – TJ Vítkovice
- 1981–82 – HC Dukla Jihlava
- 1982–83 – HC Dukla Jihlava
- 1983–84 – HC Dukla Jihlava
- 1984–85 – HC Dukla Jihlava
- 1985–86 – TJ VSŽ Košice
- 1986–87 – Tesla Pardubice
- 1987–88 – TJ VSŽ Košice
- 1988–89 – Tesla Pardubice
- 1989–90 – HC Sparta Praha
- 1990–91 – HC Dukla Jihlava
- 1991–92 – Dukla Trenčín
- 1992–93 – HC Sparta Praha

== Notable officials ==
Paul Loicq Award recipient Juraj Okoličány worked 15 seasons in the league, and made his officiating debut at age 19.

== See also ==
- Czech Extraliga
- Slovak Extraliga
