= HC ATK Praha =

- City: Prague, Czechoslovakia
- League: Czechoslovak First Ice Hockey League
- Founded: 1948

HC ATK (Armádní tělovýchovný klub) Praha, founded in 1948, was an ice hockey team in Czechoslovakia. It won the Czechoslovak First Ice Hockey League title in the 1949–50 season and played in the league for a total of eight seasons. The club also celebrated second and third placed league finishes. The club changed its name to ÚDA (Ústřední dům armády) Praha ahead of the 1953/54 season and ceased operations in 1956.

== Team success ==
- Czechoslovak Extraliga
  - 1st place (1950)
  - 2nd place (1952)
  - 3rd place (1949)
