= HC Vítkovice Ridera =

- Nickname: "Vítky"
- City: Ostrava, Czech Republic
- League: Czech Extraliga
- Founded: 1928
- Home arena: Ostravar Aréna (capacity: 9,833)
- Colours: Blue, white
- Mascot: Rytíř Vítek (Knight Vítek)
- Owner: Aleš Pavlík
- President: František Černík
- General manager: Roman Šimíček
- Head coach: Václav Varaďa
- Captain: Marek Kalus
- Website: hc-vitkovice.cz

Franchise history
- 1928–1929: SK Moravská Ostrava
- 1929–1936: SSK Vítkovice
- 1936–1945: ČSK Vítkovice
- 1945–1948: SK Vítkovické železárny
- 1948–1952: Sokol VŽKG
- 1952–1957: Baník VŽKG
- 1957–1976: TJ VŽKG Ostrava
- 1976–1993: TJ Vítkovice
- 1993–2005: HC Vítkovice
- 2005–2016: HC Vítkovice Steel
- 2016–Present: HC Vítkovice Ridera

HC Vítkovice Ridera is a professional ice hockey team based in Vítkovice, the Moravian-part of Ostrava, in the Czech Republic, competing in the Czech Extraliga. It plays at Ostravar Aréna.

The club was founded in 1928 after the merger of SK Moravská Slavia and SK Slovan Ostrava. Vítkovice were the champions of the Czechoslovak First Ice Hockey League in the 1951–52 and 1980–81 seasons.

Its biggest rivals are HC Oceláři Třinec and HC Sparta Prague.

== Honours ==
=== Domestic ===
Czech Extraliga

- (silver) Runners-up (4): 1996–97, 2001–02, 2009–10, 2010–11
- (bronze) 3rd place (2): 1997–98, 2000–01

Czechoslovak Extraliga

- (gold) Winners (2): 1951–52, 1980–81
- (silver) Runners-up (5): 1949–50, 1950–51, 1952–53, 1982–83, 1992–93
- (bronze) 3rd place (2): 1957–58, 1978–79

=== International ===
IIHF European Cup

- (silver) Runners-up (1): 1981–82

=== Pre-season ===
Spengler Cup

- (silver) Runners-up (1): 1980

Tatra Cup

- (gold) Winners (5): 1968/1969, 2002, 2006, 2007, 2009

== Players ==
=== Current roster ===
As of 16 February 2025.

No.	Nat	Player	Pos	S/G	Age	Acquired	Birthplace
24	(Czech Republic)	Jindřich Abdul	RW	L	30	2024	Vsetín, Czech Republic
81	(France)	Yohann Auvitu	D	L	37	2023	Ivry-sur-Seine, France
72	(Czech Republic)	Jan Bambula	LW	L	25	2024	Havířov, Czech Republic
91	(Czech Republic)	Marcel Barinka	C	R	25	2023	Prague, Czech Republic
13	(Latvia)	Rihards Bukarts	W	R	30	2023	Jurmala, Latvia
71	(Latvia)	Roberts Bukarts	LW	R	36	2021	Jurmala, Latvian SSR, Soviet Union
8	(Czech Republic)	Patrik Demel (A)	D	L	30	2024	Ostrava, Czech Republic
15	(Czech Republic)	Jan Eberle	W	L	37	2024	Kladno, Czechoslovakia
79	(Czech Republic)	Martin Hanzl	C	L	32	2024	Ústí nad Labem, Czech Republic
10	(Czech Republic)	Petr Hašek	C	L	24	2024	Beroun, Czech Republic
93	(Czech Republic)	Petr Hauser	RW	R	22	2024	Plzeň, Czech Republic
67	(Czech Republic)	Jan Hladonik	C	L	26	2024	Třinec, Czech Republic
49	(Czech Republic)	Dominik Hrachovina	G	L	31	2024	Brno, Czech Republic
11	(Czech Republic)	Marek Kalus (C)	LW	L	33	2020	Ostrava, Czech Republic
33	(Czech Republic)	Lukáš Klimeš	G	L	32	2022	Brno, Czech Republic
3	(Czech Republic)	Jan Košťálek	D	R	31	2024	Prague, Czech Republic
18	(Czech Republic)	Lukáš Kovář	D	L	34	2020	Ostrava, Czechoslovakia
4	(Canada)	Joe Leahy	D	L	29	2024	Waterloo, Ontario, Canada
23	(Czech Republic)	Vojtěch Lednický	LW	R	25	2020	Frýdek-Místek, Czech Republic
44	(Czech Republic)	Patrik Marcel	D	L	31	2024	Plzeň, Czech Republic
2	(Slovakia)	Juraj Mikuš	D	L	37	2022	Trenčín, Czechoslovakia
19	(Canada)	Anthony Nellis	LW	L	31	2024	Lévis, Quebec, Canada
1	(Czech Republic)	Lukáš Pařík	G	L	25	2024	Neratovice, Czech Republic
43	(Canada)	Stuart Percy	D	L	33	2023	Oakville, Ontario, Canada
17	(Czech Republic)	Matěj Prčík	D	L	22	2022	Hodonín, Czech Republic
62	(Czech Republic)	Robert Říčka	RW	R	37	2024	Havířov, Czechoslovakia
21	(Canada)	Chad Yetman	C	R	26	2024	Ajax, Ontario, Canada
25	(Czech Republic)	Patrik Zdráhal (A)	LW	L	31	2023	Ostrava, Czech Republic

== See also ==
- Category:HC Vítkovice players for a list of HC Vítkovice players past and present.

Preceded by SKP České Budějovice	Czechoslovak Extraliga champions 1951–52	Succeeded by Spartak Praha Sokolovo
Preceded by Poldi SONP Kladno	Czechoslovak Extraliga champions 1980–81	Succeeded by HC Dukla Jihlava
