= LTC Praha =

- City: Prague, Czechoslovakia
- Founded: 1903
- Operated: 1903–1949
- Colours: Red and yellow

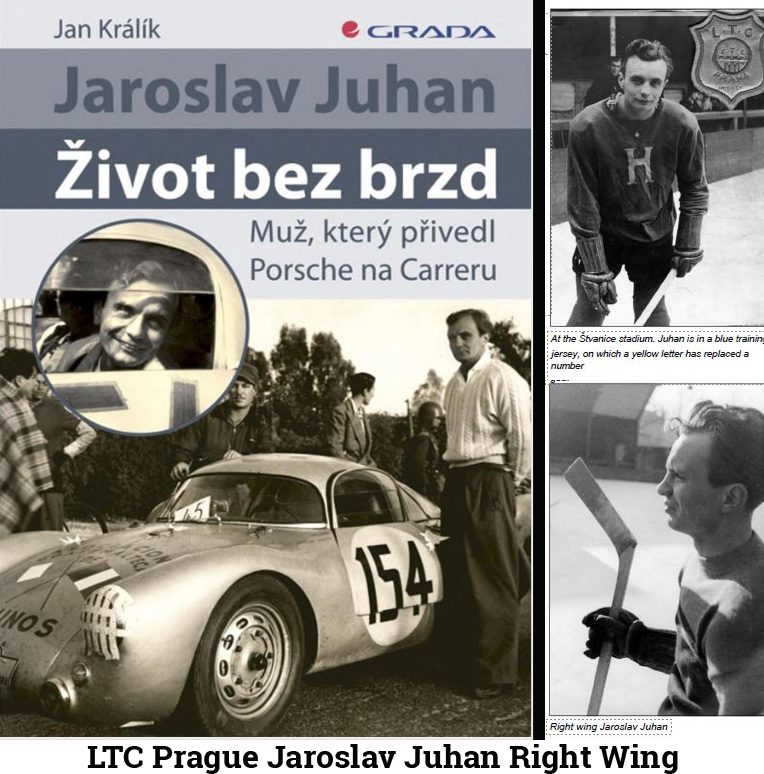

LTC (Lawn Tennis Club) Praha was a Czech ice hockey club founded in 1903 in Prague.

The main sport in this club was originally tennis, with hockey being a minor sport; hockey at the time rather meaning bandy. This changed in 1927 when there was a quarrel among ice hockey players of Sparta Prague, and many elite players moved to LTC. The club then became one of the nation's top teams, with many players from LTC Prague on the Czechoslovak national team. The team won the Spengler Cup seven times, and twice they finished second. While the national team was preparing to depart for the 1950 World Championship they were inexplicably imprisoned, preventing them from defending their world title, and effectively putting an end to LTC Praha.

== Achievements ==
- Czechoslovak league titles: 11 (1937, 1938, 1939, 1940, 1942, 1943, 1944, 1946, 1947, 1948, 1949)

=== Pre-season ===
- Spengler cup winner: 7 (1929, 1930, 1932, 1937, 1946, 1947, 1948)
- Spengler cup runner-up: 2 (1933, 1938)
