= Motor České Budějovice =

HC Banes Motor České Budějovice
- Nickname: Motor
- City: České Budějovice, Czech Republic
- League: Czech 1.liga 2004-05, 2013–2020; Czech Extraliga; 1993-2004, 2005–2013, 2020–
- Founded: 1928
- Home arena: Budvar Arena (capacity: 6,421)
- Colours: Red, blue,
- Owner: CB Hockey 2013
- President: Roman Turek
- General manager: Václav Nedorost
- Head coach: Róbert Petrovický
- Asst. coach: Valdemar Jiruš, David Vrbata
- Captain: Michal Bulíř
- Website: hcmotor.cz

Franchise history
- 1928–1948: AC Stadion České Budějovice
- 1949–1950: ZSJ Obchodní domy České Budějovice
- 1950–1952: SKP České Budějovice
- 1965–1992: Motor České Budějovice
- 1992–2006: HC České Budějovice
- 2006–2013: HC Mountfield
- 2013–2020: ČEZ Motor České Budějovice
- 2021–2023: HC Motor České Budějovice
- 2023–present: HC Banes Motor Česke Budějovice

Hockey Club Banes Motor České Budějovice is a professional men's ice hockey club based in České Budějovice, Czech Republic.

== History ==
=== Bandy era in České Budějovice ===
The long history started in 1911, when group of young gymnasium students devised a plan to start a bandy team. Their first hockey rinks were situated exactly where the Malše river and Vltava river merge. Dr. Zdeněk Černý was the first coach, manager, as well as a player of the team. The bandy club lasted until World War I. Some of the first victims of the war were players from České Budějovice such as Áda Schrabal, Karel Selinka, Jan Vrkoč, and Leo Feigl.

=== Adaptation to ice hockey ===
On 3 December 1921 SK České Budějovice played its first amateur ice hockey match in Strakonice.

On 10 January 1928 a club known as AC Stadion České Budějovice was founded by the merging two clubs in České Budějovice - Viktoria and Slovan. The club joined Czechoslovak First Ice Hockey League, the nation's top ice hockey league, in 1936. In their first season, they finished third behind LTC Praha and AC Sparta Praha.

=== Lone championship & decades of failure ===
In the 1950–51 season, the club, now called SKP České Budějovice, won its first and only championship in any top-tier league. The club has failed to finish higher than third place (1952–53) in the highest league ever since.

After a disastrous 1962–63 season in which the team won none of the 32 games, the club was relegated to the Czechoslovak Second League until 1968. Overall, HC České Budějovice had been relegated to the second-tier league five other times since the 1958-59 season as of 2013; in each case the club re-earned promotion to the top league the following season.

Although it lost in the semifinals of the 2007–08 Czech Extraliga season, HC České Budějovice qualified for the 2008–09 Champions Hockey League as the winner of the regular season. However, its success was short-lived, as it finished eleventh and survived a relegation round the following season.

=== War of the Beers ===
Following the 2012–13 season, the Czech Extraliga reached a sponsorship deal with Radegast to sell its beer in all Extraliga arenas. This agreement conflicted with the deal České Budějovice already had with Budweiser Budvar Brewery for their arena. Under the agreement, the club and the city of České Budějovice would face stiff penalties for selling any beer other than Radegast products. Unable to resolve the dispute, the club decided on 18 June 2013 that no new agreement could be reached between the parties involved and voted to immediately relocate to Hradec Králové for the 2013-14 season.

In July 2013, plans were unveiled to resume professional hockey in České Budějovice, with a club playing in the Czech First National League.

== Honours ==
=== Domestic ===
Czech Extraliga

- (bronze) 3rd place (3): 1994–95, 2007–08, 2021–22

Czechoslovak Extraliga

- (gold) Winners (1): 1950–51
- (silver) Runners-up (1): 1980–81
- (bronze) 3rd place (2): 1936–37, 1952–53

(gold) Czechoslovak Second Ice Hockey League Championship (4): 1960, 1968, 1970, 1992
(gold) 1st Czech Republic Hockey League Championship (4): 2005, 2017, 2019, 2020

== Players ==
=== Current roster ===
As of 4 March 2026.

No.	Nat	Player	Pos	S/G	Age	Acquired	Birthplace
56	(Czech Republic)	Martin Beránek	RW	L	25	2023	České Budějovice, Czech Republic
88	(Czech Republic)	Michal Bulíř (C)	C	L	34	2025	Liberec, Czechoslovakia
47	(Czech Republic)	Tomáš Chlubna	RW	R	23	2021	Jihlava, Czech Republic
65	(Czech Republic)	Tomáš Cibulka	D	L	22	2024	České Budějovice, Czech Republic
52	(Czech Republic)	Milan Doudera	D	L	33	2023	Horní Bezděkov, Czech Republic
14	(Czech Republic)	Štépán Hoch	F	L	19	2023	České Budějovice, Czech Republic
37	(Slovakia)	Adrián Holešinský	C	L	30	2026	Čadca, Slovakia
27	(Czech Republic)	Matyáš Humeník	RW	R	19	2024	České Budějovice, Czech Republic
98	(Czech Republic)	Ondřej Kachyňa	D	L	28	2017	Hodonín, Czech Republic
35	(Czech Republic)	Milan Klouček	G	L	28	2024	Hradec Králové, Czech Republic
73	(Czech Republic)	Josef Koláček	C	L	23	2022	Chomutov, Czech Republic
5	(Czech Republic)	Šimon Kubíček	D	R	24	2024	Jindřichův Hradec, Czech Republic
16	(Slovakia)	Róbert Lantoši	RW	R	30	2025	Prievidza, Slovakia
29	(Czech Republic)	Jakub Lev	F	R	19	2025	Rakovník, Czech Republic
21	(Czech Republic)	Matyáš Mařík	G	L	19	2025	Mladá Boleslav, Czech Republic
11	(Czech Republic)	Pavel Novák	RW	R	24	2024	Tábor, Czech Republic
95	(Denmark)	Nick Olesen	F	L	30	2024	Frederikshavn, Denmark
45	(Czech Republic)	Jan Ordoš	RW	R	29	2023	Ústí nad Labem, Czech Republic
12	(Czech Republic)	Pavel Pýcha	D	L	30	2023	České Budějovice, Czech Republic
7	(Czech Republic)	Jan Štencel	D	L	31	2021	Opava, Czech Republic
2	(Czech Republic)	Jan Strmeň	G	L	34	2018	Havířov, Czechoslovakia
20	(Czech Republic)	Matěj Toman	LW	L	25	2020	České Budějovice, Czech Republic
14	(Czech Republic)	Ondřej Vála	D	L	28	2025	Kolín, Czech Republic
69	(Czech Republic)	Roman Vráblík	D	L	36	2021	Písek, Czechoslovakia

=== Alumni ===
- See Category:Motor České Budějovice players for a list of HC České Budějovice players past and present.
