= 2023–24 Czech Extraliga season =

- League: Czech Extraliga
- Sport: Ice hockey
- Duration: 14 September 2023 – 3 March 2024 (regular season); 6 March – 28 April (playoffs)
- Teams: 14

Regular season
- Pohár Jaroslava Pouzara: HC Dynamo Pardubice
- Season MVP: Ondřej Kacetl (HC Oceláři Třinec)
- Top scorer: Tomáš Filippi (HC Bílí Tygři Liberec)

Playoffs
- Finals champions: HC Oceláři Třinec
- Runners-up: HC Dynamo Pardubice
- Finals MVP: Ondřej Kacetl (Třinec)

Czech Extraliga seasons
- 2022–23 2024–25

The 2023–24 Czech Extraliga season was the 31st season of the Czech Extraliga since its creation after the breakup of Czechoslovakia and the Czechoslovak First Ice Hockey League in 1993. Třinec won the championship for the fifth time in a row, and sixth overall, after beating Pardubice 4–3 in the finals.

== Regular season ==
=== Standings ===
Each team played 52 games, playing each of the other 13 teams four times – twice at home, and twice away. Points were awarded for each game, where three points were awarded for winning in regulation time, two points for winning in overtime or shootout, one point for losing in overtime or shootout, and zero points for losing in regulation time. At the end of the regular season, the team that finished with the most points was crowned winner of the regular season.

Pos	Team	Pld	W	OTW	OTL	L	GF	GA	GD	Pts	Qualification
1	Pardubice	52	33	8	6	5	203	115	+88	121	Qualification to Quarter-finals
2	Sparta Praha	52	32	6	3	11	172	119	+53	111	Qualification to Quarter-finals
3	Třinec	52	25	9	6	12	172	132	+40	99	Qualification to Quarter-finals
4	Kometa Brno	52	21	9	5	17	160	139	+21	86	Qualification to Quarter-finals
5	Litvínov	52	23	5	4	20	163	165	−2	83	Qualification to Wild card round
6	České Budějovice	52	23	2	10	17	147	149	−2	83	Qualification to Wild card round
7	Liberec	52	24	3	4	21	174	165	+9	82	Qualification to Wild card round
8	Mountfield HK	52	16	8	11	17	135	137	−2	75	Qualification to Wild card round
9	Vítkovice	52	18	5	8	21	132	138	−6	72	Qualification to Wild card round
10	Olomouc	52	16	7	6	23	123	155	−32	68	Qualification to Wild card round
11	Karlovy Vary	52	14	8	3	27	128	146	−18	61	Qualification to Wild card round
12	Plzeň	52	14	6	4	28	130	155	−25	58	Qualification to Wild card round
13	Mladá Boleslav	52	12	6	6	28	106	154	−48	54	
14	Kladno	52	7	4	10	31	120	196	−76	39	Qualification to Play Out

Source: Tipsport Extraliga
Rules for classification: 1) Points; 2) Head-to-head points.

=== Statistics ===
==== Scoring leaders ====
The following shows the top ten players who led the league in points, at the conclusion of the regular season.

Player	Team	GP	G	A	Pts	+/–	PIM

==== Leading goaltenders ====
The following shows the top ten goaltenders who led the league in goals against average, provided that they have played at least 40% of their team's minutes, at the conclusion of the regular season.

Player	Team	GP	TOI	W	L	GA	SO	Sv%	GAA

== Relegation series ==
The promotion/relegation series featured Rytíři Kladno, the last-place team in the regular season, and VHK Vsetín, the 1. Liga winners. Kladno swept the best-of-seven series and will remain in the Extraliga in 2024–25.

17 April 2024; 17:00 (CEST)	Kladno	4–1 (0–0, 3–0, 1–1) score in the series: 1–0	Vsetín	ČEZ Stadion, Kladno; Attendance: 5,200

Game reference

Adam Brízgala
Goalies
Patrik Romančík
Referees:
Adam Kika
Luděk Pilný
Linesmen:
Miroslav Lhotský
David Thuma

Filip (Jarůšek, Tralmaks) – 28:16	1–0
Jarůšek (Melka, Frolík) – 31:00	2–0
Jarůšek (Filip, Procházka) – 37:13	3–0
Tralmaks (Smoleňák) – 50:56	4–0
	4–1	57:28 – Matějček (Rob)

12 min
Penalties
4 min
26
Shots
43

18 April 2024; 18:00 (CEST)	Kladno	7–2 (3–1, 4–1, 0–0) score in the series: 2–0	Vsetín	ČEZ Stadion, Kladno; Attendance: 5,200

Game reference

Adam Brízgala
Goalies
Patrik Romančík
Referees:
Filip Vrba
Jakub Šindel
Linesmen:
Tomáš Brejcha
Josef Špůr

Jágr (Strnad) – 01:59	1–0
Tralmaks (Filip) – 08:11	2–0
	2–1	09:19 – Jonák (Teper, Jenáček) (PP)
Melka (Strnad, Ticháček) – 19:44	3–1
Smoleňák (Tralmaks, Sideroff) – 21:02	4–1
Melka (Strnad, Jágr) – 22:11	5–1
	5–2	26:26 – Klhůfek (Teper, Jenáček) (PP)
Procházka (Slováček) (PP) – 33:11	6–2
Procházka (Jarůšek) (PP) – 36:14	7–2

20 min
Penalties
39 min
36
Shots
30

21 April 2024; 17:00 (CEST)	Vsetín	2–3 (0–1, 2–2, 0–0) score in the series: 0–3	Kladno	Zimní stadion Na Lapači, Vsetín; Attendance: 7,700

Game reference

Maksim Zhukov
Goalies
Adam Brízgala
Referees:
Adam Kika
Jiří Ondráček
Linesmen:
Lukáš Rampír
Petr Šimánek

	0–1	03:09 – Jarůšek (Filip, Slováček)
	0–2	36:41 – Tralmaks (Klepiš, Pytlík) (PP)
Dědek – 38:00	1–2
	1–3	39:33 – Procházka (Klepiš, Jarůšek)
Hrňa (Dědek) – 39:56	2–3

6 min
Penalties
10 min
26
Shots
31

22 April 2024; 18:00 (CEST)	Vsetín	3–4 (1–0, 1–2, 1–2) score in the series: 0–4	Kladno	Zimní stadion Na Lapači, Vsetín; Attendance: 7,700

Game reference

Maksim Zhukov
Goalies
Adam Brízgala
Referees:
Roman Mrkva
Jakub Šindel
Linesmen:
Pavel Blažek
Vít Lederer

Bláha (Machala) (SH) – 16:47	1–0
	1–1	22:59 – Smoleňák (Ticháček, Klepiš) (PP)
	1–2	32:51 – Sideroff (Slováček, Pytlík)
Machala (Klhůfek, Jenáček) (PP) – 35:42	2–2
Bláha (Matějček) – 41:11	3–2
	3–3	47:47 – Procházka (Slováček, Filip) (PP)
	3–4	52:42 – Filip (Slováček) (SH)

12 min
Penalties
10 min
23
Shots
37

== Playoffs ==
Twelve teams qualify for the playoffs: the top four teams in the regular season have a bye to the quarterfinals, while teams ranked fifth to twelfth meet each other (5 versus 12, 6 versus 11, 7 versus 10, 8 versus 9) in a preliminary playoff round.

=== Bracket ===
Wild-card round (best-of-5)
8	Mountfield HK	3
9	Vítkovice	0
5	Litvínov	3
12	Plzeň	0
7	Liberec	3
10	Olomouc	2
6	České Budějovice	3
11	Karlovy Vary	0

Quarter-finals (best-of-7)
1	Pardubice	4
8	Mountfield HK	1
4	Kometa Brno	2
5	Litvínov	4
2	Sparta Praha	4
7	Liberec	0
3	Třinec	4
6	České Budějovice	3

Semi-finals (best-of-7)
1	Pardubice	4
5	Litvínov	0
(Pairings are re-seeded after the first and second round)
2	Sparta Praha	3
3	Třinec	4

Finals (best-of-7)
1	Pardubice	3
3	Třinec	4

=== Wild card round ===
Litvínov – Plzeň 3–0
6.3.2024	Litvínov	Plzeň	4-2
7.3.2024	Litvínov	Plzeň	4-1
9.3.2024	Plzeň	Litvínov	1-2 OT
Litvínov won the series 3–0.

Liberec – Olomouc 3–2
6.3.2024	Liberec	Olomouc	0-1 OT
7.3.2024	Liberec	Olomouc	2-3 OT
9.3.2024	Olomouc	Liberec	3-4
10.3.2024	Olomouc	Liberec	3-5
12.3.2024	Liberec	Olomouc	4-1
Liberec won the series 3–2.

České Budějovice – Karlovy Vary 3–0
6.3.2024	České Budějovice	Karlovy Vary	4-2
7.3.2024	České Budějovice	Karlovy Vary	5-4 OT
9.3.2024	Karlovy Vary	České Budějovice	1-3
České Budějovice won the series 3–0.

Mountfield HK – Vítkovice 3–0
6.3.2024	Mountfield HK	Vítkovice	4-3
7.3.2024	Mountfield HK	Vítkovice	1-0
9.3.2024	Vítkovice	Mountfield HK	1-3
Mountfield HK won the series 3–0.

=== Quarterfinals ===
Pardubice – Mountfield HK 4–1
15.3.2024	Pardubice	Mountfield HK	5-4 OT
16.3.2024	Pardubice	Mountfield HK	3-2
19.3.2024	Mountfield HK	Pardubice	2-1 SO
20.3.2024	Mountfield HK	Pardubice	0-1
23.3.2024	Pardubice	Mountfield HK	3-2
Pardubice won the series 4–1.

Třinec – České Budějovice 4–3
17.3.2024	Třinec	České Budějovice	2-0
18.3.2024	Třinec	České Budějovice	2-0
21.3.2024	České Budějovice	Třinec	3-4
22.3.2024	České Budějovice	Třinec	4-1
24.3.2024	Třinec	České Budějovice	2-3
26.3.2024	České Budějovice	Třinec	3-0
28.3.2024	Třinec	České Budějovice	2-0
Třinec won the series 4–3.

Sparta Praha – Liberec 4–0
15.3.2024	Sparta Praha	Liberec	3-2 SO
16.3.2024	Sparta Praha	Liberec	3-2 OT
19.3.2024	Liberec	Sparta Praha	3-5
20.3.2024	Liberec	Sparta Praha	2-5
Sparta Praha won the series 4–0.

Kometa Brno – Litvínov 2–4
17.3.2024	Kometa Brno	Litvínov	1-2 SO
18.3.2024	Kometa Brno	Litvínov	1-5
21.3.2024	Litvínov	Kometa Brno	3-4
22.3.2024	Litvínov	Kometa Brno	1-5
24.3.2024	Kometa Brno	Litvínov	1-2 OT
26.3.2024	Litvínov	Kometa Brno	4-1
Litvínov won the series 4–2.

=== Semifinals ===
Pardubice – Litvínov 4–0
31.3.2024	Pardubice	Litvínov	2-1
1.4.2024	Pardubice	Litvínov	3-0
4.4.2024	Litvínov	Pardubice	2-3
5.4.2024	Litvínov	Pardubice	5-6
Pardubice won the series 4–0.

Sparta Praha – Třinec 3–4
2.4.2024	Sparta Praha	Třinec	3-0
3.4.2024	Sparta Praha	Třinec	3-2 OT
6.4.2024	Třinec	Sparta Praha	2-3 OT
7.4.2024	Třinec	Sparta Praha	4-1
9.4.2024	Sparta Praha	Třinec	2-3
11.4.2024	Třinec	Sparta Praha	2-1 OT
13.4.2024	Sparta Praha	Třinec	2-3 OT4
Třinec won the series 4–3 ^{(and became the first club in Czech Extraliga, which turned the play-off series from 0–3 into 4–3)}.

=== Finals ===
16 April 2024	Pardubice	1–2 (0–1, 1–1, 0–0) score in the series: 0–1	Třinec	Enteria arena, Pardubice; Attendance: 10,194

Game reference
Roman Will	Goalies	Ondřej Kacetl

17 April 2024	Pardubice	6–3 (0–0, 2–1, 4–2) score in the series: 1–1	Třinec	Enteria arena, Pardubice; Attendance: 10,194

Game reference
Roman Will	Goalies	Ondřej Kacetl

20 April 2024	Třinec	4–3 (2–1, 1–1, 1–1) score in the series: 2–1	Pardubice	Werk Arena, Třinec; Attendance: 5,400

Game reference
Ondřej Kacetl	Goalies	Roman Will

21 April 2024	Třinec	2–6 (1–1, 0–2, 1–3) score in the series: 2–2	Pardubice	Werk Arena, Třinec; Attendance: 5,400

Game reference
Ondřej Kacetl	Goalies	Roman Will

24 April 2024	Pardubice	3–0 (0–0, 3–0, 0–0) score in the series: 3–2	Třinec	Enteria arena, Pardubice; Attendance: 10,194

Game reference

26 April 2024	Třinec	4–1 (2–0, 1–0, 1–1) score in the series: 3–3	Pardubice	Werk Arena, Třinec; Attendance: 5,400

Game reference
Ondřej Kacetl	Goalies	Roman Will

28 April 2024	Pardubice	1–2 OT2 (0–0, 1–1, 0–0) (OT: 0–1) score in the series: 3–4	Třinec	Enteria arena, Pardubice; Attendance: 10,194

Game reference
Roman Will	Goalies	Ondřej Kacetl
8 min	Penalties	8 min
43	Shots	23

== Final rankings ==
Gold medal	Třinec
Silver medal	Pardubice
Bronze medal	Sparta Praha
4	Litvínov
5	Kometa Brno
6	České Budějovice
7	Liberec
8	Mountfield HK
9	Vítkovice
10	Olomouc
11	Karlovy Vary
12	Plzeň
13	Mladá Boleslav
14	Kladno

== Attendances ==
#	Ice hockey club	Average attendance
1	HC Sparta Praha	11,586
2	HC Dynamo Pardubice	9,460
3	HC Kometa Brno	6,875
4	Motor České Budějovice	6,132
5	HC Vítkovice Ridera	5,350
6	HC Bílí Tygři Liberec	5,333
7	HC Škoda Plzeň	4,773
8	HC Olomouc	4,754
9	HC Litvínov	4,639
10	HC Oceláři Třinec	4,586
11	Mountfield HK	4,362
12	HC Energie Karlovy Vary	4,346
13	BK Mladá Boleslav	3,016
14	Rytíři Kladno	2,653
