= 2022–23 Czech Extraliga season =

- League: Czech Extraliga
- Sport: Ice hockey
- Duration: 15 September 2022 – 5 March 2023 (regular season); 8 March – 28 April (playoffs)
- Number of teams: 14

Regular season
- Pohár Jaroslava Pouzara: HC Dynamo Pardubice
- Top scorer: Martin Růžička (Třinec); (52 points)

Playoffs

Finals
- Champions: Třinec
- Runners-up: Mountfield HK

Czech Extraliga seasons
- ← 2021–22 2023–24 →

The 2022–23 Czech Extraliga season was the 30th season of the Czech Extraliga since its creation after the breakup of Czechoslovakia and the Czechoslovak First Ice Hockey League in 1993. Třinec won the Extraliga for the fourth consecutive season, beating Hradec Králové-based Mountfield HK in the finals by 4 games to 2.

== Regular season ==
=== Standings ===
Each team played 52 games, playing each of the other 13 teams four times – twice at home, and twice away. Points were awarded for each game, where three points were awarded for winning in regulation time, two points for winning in overtime or shootout, one point for losing in overtime or shootout, and zero points for losing in regulation time. At the end of the regular season, the team that finished with the most points was crowned winner of the regular season.

Pos	Team	Pld	W	OTW	OTL	L	GF	GA	GD	Pts	Qualification
1	Pardubice	52	29	8	5	10	159	110	+49	108	Qualification to Quarter-finals
2	Vítkovice	52	28	4	10	10	159	122	+37	102	Qualification to Quarter-finals
3	Sparta Praha	52	28	6	3	15	155	122	+33	99	Qualification to Quarter-finals
4	Mountfield HK	52	23	7	5	17	141	124	+17	88	Qualification to Quarter-finals
5	Liberec	52	19	10	10	13	156	129	+27	87	Qualification to Wild card round
6	Třinec	52	21	5	7	19	149	121	+28	80	Qualification to Wild card round
7	Kometa Brno	52	19	6	3	24	134	150	−16	72	Qualification to Wild card round
8	Olomouc	52	19	6	2	25	121	141	−20	71	Qualification to Wild card round
9	Karlovy Vary	52	19	4	3	26	129	163	−34	68	Qualification to Wild card round
10	Mladá Boleslav	52	15	7	8	22	116	128	−12	67	Qualification to Wild card round
11	Litvínov	52	15	7	8	22	137	144	−7	67	Qualification to Wild card round
12	Plzeň	52	15	6	8	23	127	146	−19	65	Qualification to Wild card round
13	České Budějovice	52	15	5	6	26	132	158	−26	61	
14	Kladno	52	15	3	6	28	122	179	−57	57	Qualification to Play Out

Source: Tipsport Extraliga
Rules for classification: 1) Points; 2) Head-to-head points.

=== Statistics ===
==== Scoring leaders ====
The following shows the top ten players who led the league in points, at the conclusion of the regular season.

Player	Team	GP	G	A	Pts	+/–	PIM
(Czech Republic) Martin Růžička	HC Oceláři Třinec	52	23	29	52	+7	18
(Slovakia) Marko Daňo	HC Oceláři Třinec	51	29	22	51	+15	36
(Czech Republic) Tomáš Plekanec	Rytíři Kladno	52	16	33	49	−6	34
(Czech Republic) Petr Holík	HC Kometa Brno	52	12	36	48	−4	22
(Latvia) Roberts Bukarts	HC Vítkovice Ridera	52	21	26	47	+7	10
(Czech Republic) Dominik Lakatoš	HC Vítkovice Ridera	51	18	29	47	+20	53
(Czech Republic) Andrej Nestrašil	HC Oceláři Třinec	44	10	36	46	+10	10
(Czech Republic) Lukáš Pech	HC Motor České Budějovice	49	8	38	46	−4	48
(Czech Republic) Milan Gulaš	HC Motor České Budějovice	47	24	18	42	−8	24
(Czech Republic) Lukáš Radil	HC Dynamo Pardubice	49	14	26	40	+29	30

==== Leading goaltenders ====
The following shows the top ten goaltenders who led the league in goals against average, provided that they have played at least 40% of their team's minutes, at the conclusion of the regular season.

Player	Team	GP	TOI	W	L	GA	SO	Sv%	GAA

== Relegation series ==
A relegation series was played between Rytíři Kladno, the 14th team in the regular season, and PSG Berani Zlín, the winner of the same season's 1. Liga. The winner of the best-of-seven series would play in the 2023–24 Czech Extraliga.

16 April 2023; 16:00 (CEST)	Kladno	1–0 (0–0, 0–0, 1–0) score in the series: 1–0	Zlín	ČEZ Stadion, Kladno; Attendance: 5,200

Game reference
Adam Brízgala	Goalies	Daniel Huf	Referees: Adam Kika; Jan Hribik; Linesmen: Daniel Hynek; Stanislav Hnát
Indrák (Klepiš, Slováček) – 43:54 / 1–0			Referees: Adam Kika; Jan Hribik; Linesmen: Daniel Hynek; Stanislav Hnát
4 min	Penalties	8 min	Referees: Adam Kika; Jan Hribik; Linesmen: Daniel Hynek; Stanislav Hnát
40	Shots	22	Referees: Adam Kika; Jan Hribik; Linesmen: Daniel Hynek; Stanislav Hnát

17 April 2023; 18:00 (CEST)	Kladno	3–1 (2–0, 0–0, 1–1) score in the series: 2–0	Zlín	ČEZ Stadion, Kladno; Attendance: 5,200

Game reference

Adam Brízgala
Goalies
Daniel Huf
Referees:
Robin Šír
Oldřich Hejduk
Linesmen:
Tomáš Brejcha
Michal Zíka

Slováček (Veber, Filip) – 01:56	1–0
Beran (Bláha, Filip) – 04:27	2–0
Babka (Bláha, Pytlík) – 44:50	3–0
	3–1	47:55 – Kratochvíl (Kindl, Zbořil)

18 min
Penalties
16 min
38
Shots
33

20 April 2023; 17:30 (CEST)	Zlín	1–7 (0–4, 0–3, 1–0) score in the series: 0–3	Kladno	Zimní stadion Luďka Čajky, Zlín; Attendance: 7,000

Game reference

Daniel Huf
Michal Kořének
Goalies
Adam Brízgala
Referees:
René Hradil
Roman Mrkva
Linesmen:
Vít Lederer
Michal Axman

	0–1	03:26 – Plekanec (Kubík) (SH)
	0–2	06:07 – Filip (Slováček, Veber)
	0–3	17:45 – Pytlík (Klepiš, Zikmund)
	0–4	18:33 – Indrák (Kubík, Plekanec)
	0–5	21:02 – Ticháček (Filip, Procházka)
	0–6	31:52 – Zikmund (Ticháček, Klepiš) (PP)
	0–7	39:38 – Plekanec
Kratochvíl (Mrázek, Sedlák) (PP) – 54:46	1–7

10 min
Penalties
4 min
17
Shots
43

21 April 2023; 17:30 (CEST)	Zlín	0–1 (0–0, 0–1, 0–0) score in the series: 0–4	Kladno	Zimní stadion Luďka Čajky, Zlín; Attendance: 7,000

Game reference
Daniel Huf	Goalies	Adam Brízgala	Referees: Oldřich Hejduk; Jakub Šindel; Linesmen: Daniel Hynek; Petr Šimánek
0–1 / 21:06 – Indrák (Ticháček, Klepiš)			Referees: Oldřich Hejduk; Jakub Šindel; Linesmen: Daniel Hynek; Petr Šimánek
8 min	Penalties	4 min	Referees: Oldřich Hejduk; Jakub Šindel; Linesmen: Daniel Hynek; Petr Šimánek
16	Shots	38	Referees: Oldřich Hejduk; Jakub Šindel; Linesmen: Daniel Hynek; Petr Šimánek

== Playoffs ==
Twelve teams qualify for the playoffs: the top four teams in the regular season have a bye to the quarterfinals, while teams ranked fifth to twelfth meet each other (5 versus 12, 6 versus 11, 7 versus 10, 8 versus 9) in a preliminary playoff round.

=== Bracket ===
Wild-card round (best-of-5)
7	Kometa Brno	3
10	Mladá Boleslav	1
5	Liberec	3
12	Plzeň	2
8	Olomouc	3
9	Karlovy Vary	1
6	Třinec	3
11	Litvínov	0

Quarter-finals (best-of-7)
2	Vítkovice	4
7	Kometa Brno	2
4	Mountfield HK	4
5	Liberec	1
1	Pardubice	4
8	Olomouc	0
3	Sparta Praha	2
6	Třinec	4

Semi-finals (best-of-7)
2	Vítkovice	3
4	Mountfield HK	4
(Pairings are re-seeded after the first and second round)
1	Pardubice	3
6	Třinec	4

Finals (best-of-7)
4	Mountfield HK	2
6	Třinec	4

=== Wild card round ===
Liberec – Plzeň 3–2
8.3.2023	Liberec	Plzeň	4-1
9.3.2023	Liberec	Plzeň	0-6
11.3.2023	Plzeň	Liberec	1-3
12.3.2023	Plzeň	Liberec	2-1 OT
14.3.2023	Liberec	Plzeň	4-3 OT
Liberec won the series 3–2.

Kometa Brno – Mladá Boleslav 3–1
8.3.2023.	Kometa Brno	Mladá Boleslav	4-2
9.3.2023	Kometa Brno	Mladá Boleslav	2-1
11.3.2023	Mladá Boleslav	Kometa Brno	2-1
12.3.2023	Mladá Boleslav	Kometa Brno	1-5
Kometa Brno won the series 3–1.

Třinec – Litvínov 3–0
8.3.2023	Třinec	Litvínov	3-1
9.3.2023	Třinec	Litvínov	5-4 OT
11.3.2023	Litvínov	Třinec	2-4
Třinec won the series 3–0.

Olomouc – Karlovy Vary 3–1
9.3.2023	Olomouc	Karlovy Vary	4-1
11.3.2023	Karlovy Vary	Olomouc	7-4
12.3.2023	Karlovy Vary	Olomouc	2-3 OT
14.3.2023	Olomouc	Karlovy Vary	3-0
Olomouc won the series 3–1.

=== Quarterfinals ===
Pardubice – Olomouc 4–0
17.3.2023	Pardubice	Olomouc	5-1
18.3.2023	Pardubice	Olomouc	2-0
21.3.2023	Olomouc	Pardubice	4-5 OT
22.3.2023	Olomouc	Pardubice	2-3
Pardubice won the series 4–0.

Sparta Praha – Třinec 2–4
19.3.2023	Sparta Praha	Třinec	3-2
20.3.2023	Sparta Praha	Třinec	2-3 OT
23.3.2023	Třinec	Sparta Praha	2-4
24.3.2023	Třinec	Sparta Praha	3-1
26.3.2023	Sparta Praha	Třinec	0-3
28.3.2023	Třinec	Sparta Praha	5-1
Třinec won the series 4–2.

Vítkovice – Kometa Brno 4–2
17.3.2023	Vítkovice	Kometa Brno	3-2
18.3.2023	Vítkovice	Kometa Brno	0-3
21.3.2023	Kometa Brno	Vítkovice	1-4
22.3.2023	Kometa Brno	Vítkovice	2-1
25.3.2023	Vítkovice	Kometa Brno	1-0
27.3.2023	Kometa Brno	Vítkovice	3-4 OT
Vítkovice won the series 4–2.

Mountfield HK – Liberec 4–1
19.3.2023	Mountfield HK	Liberec	2-4
20.3.2023	Mountfield HK	Liberec	3-2
23.3.2023	Liberec	Mountfield HK	1-2 OT
24.3.2023	Liberec	Mountfield HK	1-2
26.3.2023	Mountfield HK	Liberec	6-4
Mountfield won the series 4–1.

=== Semifinals ===
Pardubice – Třinec 3–4
2.4.2023	Pardubice	Třinec	4-2
3.4.2023	Pardubice	Třinec	0-3
6.4.2023	Třinec	Pardubice	2-1
7.4.2023	Třinec	Pardubice	0-2
10.4.2023	Pardubice	Třinec	2-4
12.4.2023	Třinec	Pardubice	3-5
14.4.2023	Pardubice	Třinec	1-2
Třinec won the series 4–3.

Vítkovice – Mountfield HK 3–4
4.4.2023	Vítkovice	Mountfield HK	0-1 SO
5.4.2023	Vítkovice	Mountfield HK	2-3 OT
8.4.2023	Mountfield HK	Vítkovice	4-2
9.4.2023	Mountfield HK	Vítkovice	1-2
11.4.2023	Vítkovice	Mountfield HK	3-2 OT2
13.4.2023	Mountfield HK	Vítkovice	1-2 OT4
15.4.2023	Vítkovice	Mountfield HK	1-2 OT
Mountfield HK won the series 4–3.

=== Finals ===
18 April 2023; 17:00 (CEST)	Mountfield HK	2–4 (0–0, 0–1, 2–3) score in the series: 0–1	Třinec	ČPP Arena, Hradec Králové; Attendance: 6,890

Game reference

Matěj Machovský
Goalies
Ondřej Kacetl
Referees:
Antonín Jeřábek
Jiří Ondráček
Linesmen:
Daniel Hynek
Petr Šimánek

	0–1	29:11 – Kurovský (Roman, Adámek)
	0–2	40:50 – Voženílek (Daňo)
Klíma (Okuliar) – 41:12	1–2
Smoleňák (Pilař) – 43:52	2–2
	2–3	48:43 – Voženílek (Daňo)
	2–4	59:21 – Dravecký (Nestrašil)

4 min
Penalties
4 min
29
Shots
23

19 April 2023; 17:00 (CEST)	Mountfield HK	1–2 OT (0–1, 1–0, 0–0) (OT: 0–1) score in the series: 0–2	Třinec	ČPP Arena, Hradec Králové; Attendance: 6,890

Game reference

Matěj Machovský
Goalies
Ondřej Kacetl
Referees:
Robin Šír
Peter Stano
Linesmen:
Jiří Ondráček
Josef Špůr

	0–1	08:55 – Růžička (Voženílek, Nestrašil)
Jergl (Okuliar, Klíma) (PP1) – 22:02	1–1
	1–2	70:44 – Voženílek (Chmielewski, Daňo)

4 min
Penalties
6 min
30
Shots
23

22 April 2023; 17:00 (CEST)	Třinec	1–0 (0–0, 1–0, 0–0) score in the series: 3–0	Mountfield HK	Werk Arena, Třinec; Attendance: 5,400

Game reference
Ondřej Kacetl	Goalies	Matěj Machovský	Referees: Antonín Jeřábek; Daniel Pražák; Linesmen: Josef Špůr; Michal Zíka
Daňo (Chmielewski) – 20:54 / 1–0			Referees: Antonín Jeřábek; Daniel Pražák; Linesmen: Josef Špůr; Michal Zíka
6 min	Penalties	4 min	Referees: Antonín Jeřábek; Daniel Pražák; Linesmen: Josef Špůr; Michal Zíka
22	Shots	30	Referees: Antonín Jeřábek; Daniel Pražák; Linesmen: Josef Špůr; Michal Zíka

23 April 2023; 17:00 (CEST)	Třinec	1–2 OT (0–1, 1–0, 0–0) (OT: 0–1) score in the series: 3–1	Mountfield HK	Werk Arena, Třinec; Attendance: 5,400

Game reference

Ondřej Kacetl
Goalies
Matěj Machovský
Referees:
Jan Hribik
Robin Šír
Linesmen:
Jiří Ondráček
Jiří Svoboda

	0–1	18:07 – Jank (Jergl)
Adámek (Hudáček, Voženílek) – 24:19	1–1
	1–2	60:34 – R. Pavlík (Jank)

4 min
Penalties
8 min
30
Shots
23

26 April 2023; 17:00 (CEST)	Mountfield HK	3–0 (1–0, 1–0, 1–0) score in the series: 2–3	Třinec	ČPP Arena, Hradec Králové; Attendance: 6,890

Game reference

Matěj Machovský
Goalies
Ondřej Kacetl
Referees:
Antonín Jeřábek
Daniel Pražák
Linesmen:
Miroslav Lhotský
Josef Špůr

Miškář (Werek, R. Pavlík)– 00:27	1–0
Pilař (Okuliar, McCormack) – 36:56	2–0
Zachar (Okuliar)– 57:49	3–0

12 min
Penalties
6 min
28
Shots
30

28 April 2023; 17:00 (CEST)	Třinec	4–1 (1–0, 0–0, 3–1) score in the series: 4–2	Mountfield HK	Werk Arena, Třinec; Attendance: 5,400

Game reference

Ondřej Kacetl
Goalies
Matěj Machovský
Referees:
Jan Hribik
Robin Šír
Linesmen:
Jiří Ondráček
Daniel Hynek

Marinčin (Voženílek) – 13:56	1–0
	1–1	46:08 – Rosandić (F. Pavlík)
Hudáček (Voženílek, Nestrašil) – 56:43	2–1
Nestrašil (Jeřábek) – 58:12	3–1
Daño (Vrána, Smith) – 58:48	4–1

2 min
Penalties
4 min
32
Shots
20

== Final rankings ==
Gold medal	Třinec
Silver medal	Mountfield HK
Bronze medal	Pardubice
4	Vítkovice
5	Sparta Praha
6	Liberec
7	Kometa Brno
8	Olomouc
9	Karlovy Vary
10	Mladá Boleslav
11	Litvínov
12	Plzeň
13	České Budějovice
14	Kladno
