= Jakub Klepiš =

Czech ice hockey player (born 1984)

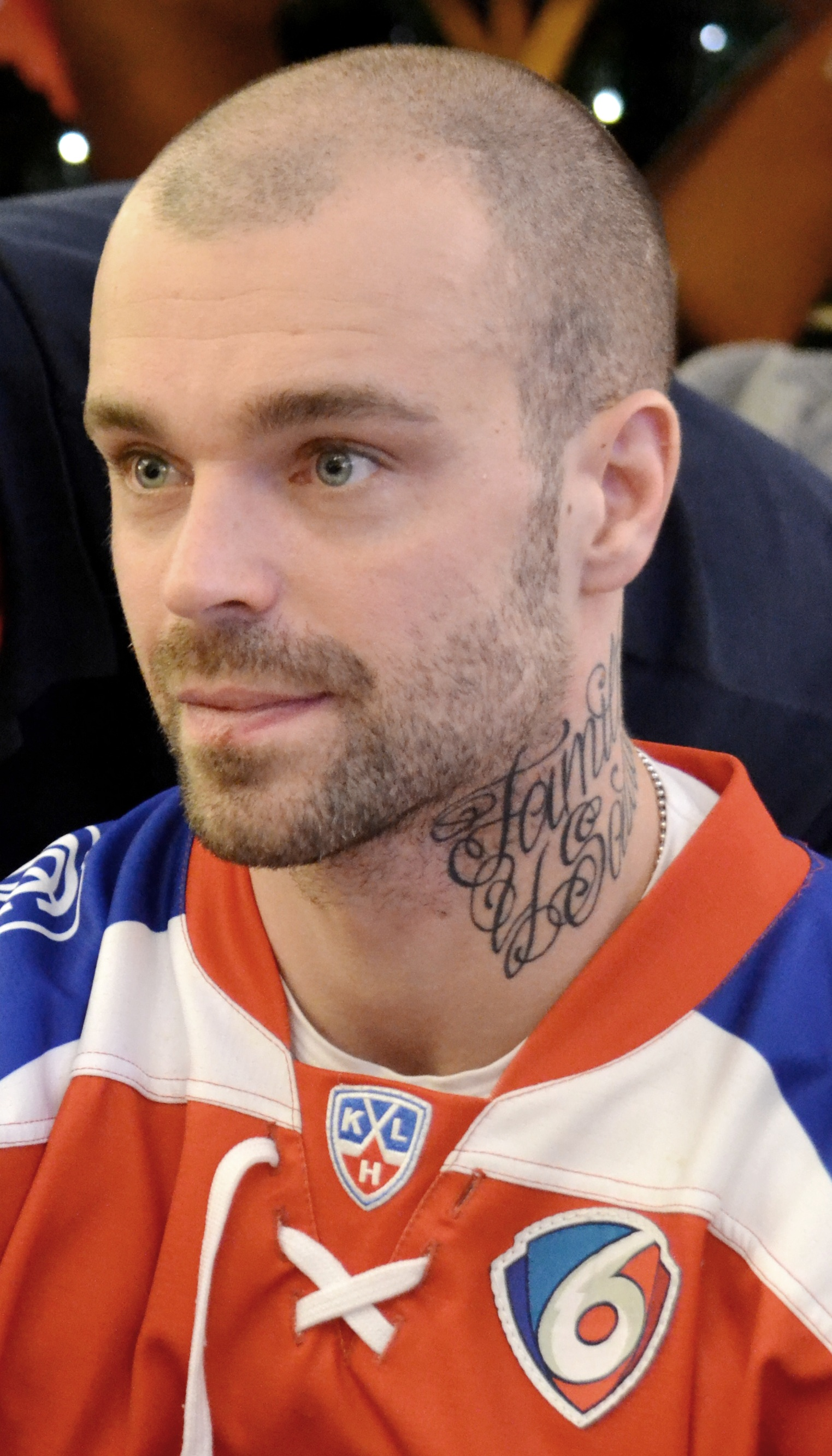
- Born: 5 June 1984 (age 42) Prague, Czechoslovakia
- Height: 6 ft 1 in (185 cm)
- Weight: 201 lb (91 kg; 14 st 5 lb)
- Position: Centre
- Shot: Right
- Played for: HC Slavia Praha; Washington Capitals; Avangard Omsk; Salavat Yulaev Ufa; Dynamo Moscow; HC Lev Praha; Färjestad BK; HC Oceláři Třinec; BK Mladá Boleslav; HC Kometa Brno; HC Bílí Tygři Liberec; Rytíři Kladno; HC Plzeň; HC Sparta Praha; HC Stadion Litoměřice
- National team: Czech Republic
- NHL draft: 16th overall, 2002; Ottawa Senators
- Playing career: 2002–2026

Jakub Klepiš (born 5 June 1984) is a former Czech professional ice hockey player who last played for HC Stadion Litoměřice of the Czech 1. Liga (Czech.1).

== Playing career ==
Klepiš was drafted in the first round, 16th overall by the Ottawa Senators in the 2002 NHL entry draft. Before ever playing for Ottawa, Klepiš was traded to the Buffalo Sabres in 2003 in a deal that sent Vaclav Varada to the Senators. Before ever playing for the Sabres, he was dealt to the Washington Capitals on 9 March 2004 in exchange for forward Mike Grier.

Klepiš ultimately played in 66 NHL games (all with the Capitals) before returning to Europe to continue his professional career in the Kontinental Hockey League.

He won the Gagarin Cup in 2012 with Dynamo Moscow, scoring the series-winning goal in the seventh game.

On 26 June 2014, he left HC Lev Praha after two seasons to join Swedish club, Färjestad BK of the SHL. He then returned to the Czech Republic joining HC Oceláři Třinec before moving to his current club, BK Mladá Boleslav, part way through the 2015/2016 league season.

In 2026, it was announced that Klepiš had retired from professional hockey.

== International play ==
Medal record

Representing (Czech Republic) Czech Rep

Ice hockey

World Championships
Gold medal – first place	2010 Cologne	

World U18 Championships
Bronze medal – third place	2002 Trnava	

Klepiš played his first game for the national team in 2004, and has played 4 World Championships for the Czech national team culminating in a gold medal win in the 2010 World Championships.

== Career statistics ==
=== Regular season and playoffs ===
			Regular season					Playoffs
Season	Team	League	GP	G	A	Pts	PIM	GP	G	A	Pts	PIM
2000–01	HC Slavia Praha	CZE U18	18	10	15	25	62	7	1	7	8	10
2000–01	HC Slavia Praha	CZE U20	27	10	3	13	10	—	—	—	—	—
2001–02	Portland Winter Hawks	WHL	70	14	50	64	111	7	0	3	3	22
2002–03	HC Slavia Praha	CZE U20	11	4	5	9	59	3	0	3	3	4
2002–03	HC Slavia Praha	ELH	38	2	6	8	22	4	0	0	0	6
2003–04	HC Slavia Praha	CZE U20	1	3	1	4	0	—	—	—	—	—
2003–04	HC Slavia Praha	ELH	44	4	9	13	43	17	5	3	8	10
2004–05	Portland Pirates	AHL	78	13	14	27	76	—	—	—	—	—
2005–06	Hershey Bears	AHL	24	3	8	11	28	15	2	6	8	4
2005–06	Washington Capitals	NHL	25	1	3	4	8	—	—	—	—	—
2006–07	Hershey Bears	AHL	31	6	26	32	24	—	—	—	—	—
2006–07	Washington Capitals	NHL	41	3	7	10	28	—	—	—	—	—
2007–08	Hershey Bears	AHL	19	5	6	11	9	—	—	—	—	—
2007–08	HC Slavia Praha	ELH	24	5	7	12	22	—	—	—	—	—
2008–09	Avangard Omsk	KHL	55	14	17	31	51	9	1	4	5	0
2009–10	Avangard Omsk	KHL	56	10	12	22	50	3	0	2	2	2
2010–11	Salavat Yulaev Ufa	KHL	49	14	12	26	16	16	1	4	5	4
2011–12	Salavat Yulaev Ufa	KHL	15	3	2	5	8	—	—	—	—	—
2011–12	Dynamo Moscow	KHL	29	4	5	9	14	14	5	1	6	6
2012–13	HC Lev Praha	KHL	45	20	18	38	24	4	0	0	0	0
2013–14	HC Lev Praha	KHL	38	8	9	17	22	4	1	0	1	4
2014–15	Färjestad BK	SHL	21	6	5	11	18	—	—	—	—	—
2014–15	HC Oceláři Třinec	ELH	17	7	14	21	22	18	4	5	9	4
2015–16	HC Oceláři Třinec	ELH	23	1	11	12	12	—	—	—	—	—
2015–16	BK Mladá Boleslav	ELH	23	5	12	17	20	10	4	0	4	22
2016–17	BK Mladá Boleslav	ELH	47	7	16	23	34	5	1	3	4	16
2017–18	BK Mladá Boleslav	ELH	47	13	19	32	26	—	—	—	—	—
2018–19	BK Mladá Boleslav	ELH	38	11	21	32	26	10	2	2	4	8
2019–20	BK Mladá Boleslav	ELH	46	7	23	30	26	—	—	—	—	—
2020–21	HC Kometa Brno	ELH	48	10	20	30	22	9	2	1	3	2
2021–22	Bílí Tygři Liberec	ELH	40	8	12	20	20	10	3	6	9	8
2022–23	Rytíři Kladno	ELH	34	9	11	20	18	—	—	—	—	—
2023–24	Rytíři Kladno	ELH	49	7	33	40	31	—	—	—	—	—
2024–25	HC Plzeň	ELH	41	4	13	17	14	4	1	2	3	0
ELH totals			559	100	227	327	358	111	35	31	66	134
NHL totals			66	4	10	14	36	—	—	—	—	—
KHL totals			287	73	75	148	185	50	8	11	19	16

=== International ===
Year	Team	Event	Result	GP	G	A	Pts	PIM
2002	Czech Republic	WJC18	3rd place, bronze medalist(s)	8	1	8	9	8
2003	Czech Republic	WJC	6th	6	0	4	4	4
2004	Czech Republic	WJC	4th	7	2	2	4	4
2008	Czech Republic	WC	5th	4	0	1	1	0
2009	Czech Republic	WC	6th	7	1	4	5	6
2010	Czech Republic	WC	1st place, gold medalist(s)	9	3	4	7	8
2014	Czech Republic	WC	4th	10	2	2	4	2
2015	Czech Republic	WC	4th	5	0	2	2	2
Junior totals				21	3	14	17	16
Senior totals				35	6	13	19	18

Preceded by Tim Gleason	Ottawa Senators first-round draft pick 2002	Succeeded by Patrick Eaves
