= Tomáš Plekanec =

Czech ice hockey player (born 1982)

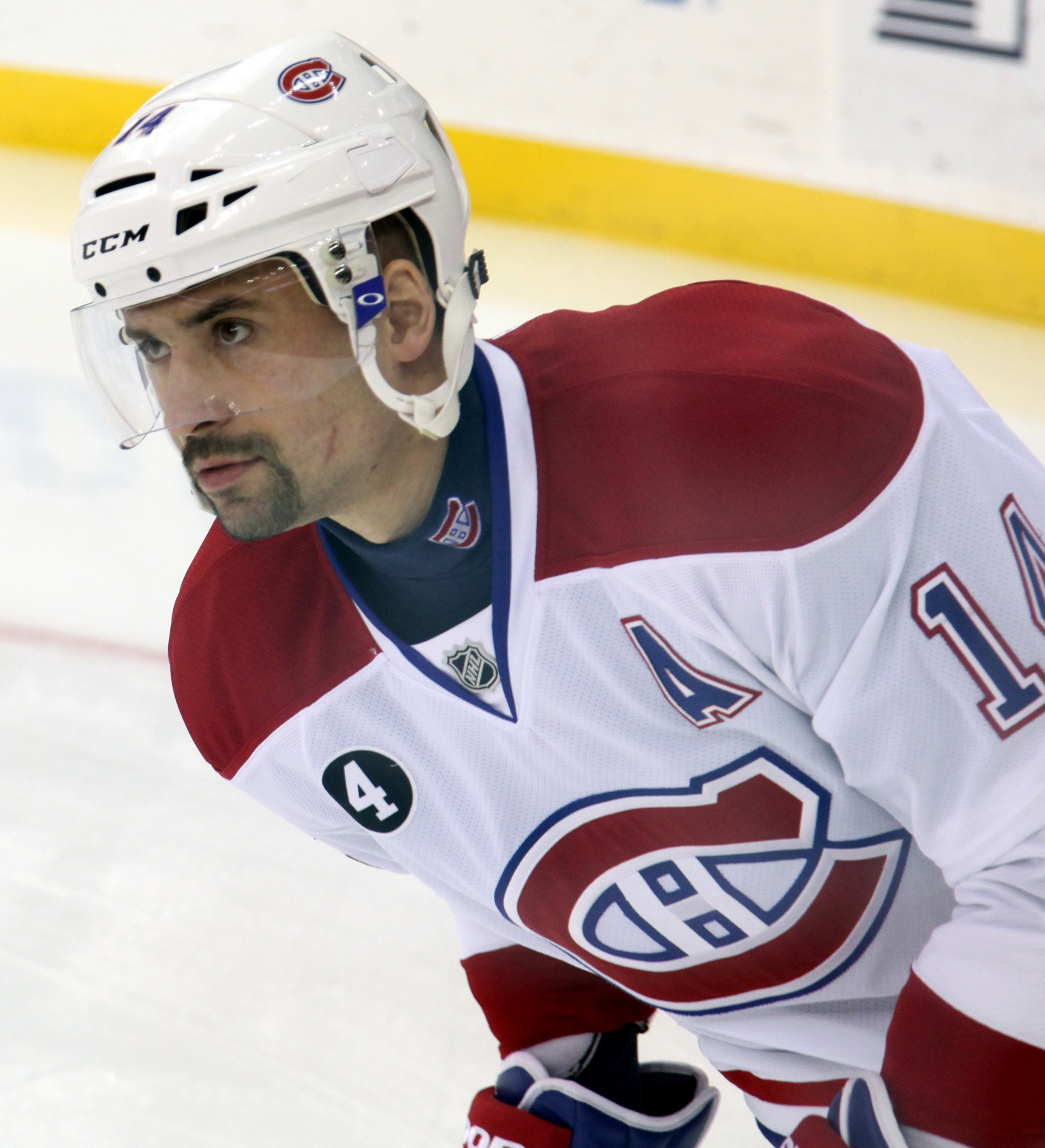
- Plekanec with the Montreal Canadiens in 2015
- Born: 31 October 1982 (age 44) Kladno, Czechoslovakia
- Height: 5 ft 11 in (180 cm)
- Weight: 195 lb (88 kg; 13 st 13 lb)
- Position: Centre
- Shot: Left
- Played for: Rytíři Kladno; Montreal Canadiens; Toronto Maple Leafs; HC Kometa Brno
- National team: Czech Republic
- NHL draft: 71st overall, 2001; Montreal Canadiens
- Playing career: 1998–2023

Tomáš Plekanec (born 31 October 1982) is a Czech former professional ice hockey centre. He played most of his National Hockey League (NHL) career for the Montreal Canadiens, and briefly played for the Toronto Maple Leafs.

After beginning his career with Rytíři Kladno, he was selected 71st overall by the Canadiens in the 2001 NHL entry draft. Moving to North America in 2002, he played three seasons for the Canadiens' American Hockey League (AHL) affiliate, the Hamilton Bulldogs, before joining the NHL club full-time for the 2005–06 season. By the time of his retirement from the NHL, he had played over 1,000 NHL games and is seventh all-time in games played for the Canadiens.

During his NHL career, Plekanec was known for his use of a turtleneck undershirt.

== Playing career ==
=== Junior ===
Plekanec played junior ice hockey in his native Czech Republic with the HC Kladno organization. He debuted with club's senior team in 1998–99, appearing in three Czech Extraliga games.

=== Professional ===
Two years later, he joined the senior team full-time, recording 42 points over 53 games. In the off-season, Plekanec was selected by the Montreal Canadiens 71st overall in the third round of the 2001 NHL entry draft. Remaining in the Czech Extraliga for a second full season, he scored 30 points over 43 games in 2001–02.

Plekanec came to North America to begin playing in the Canadiens' system in 2002–03. Assigned to the club's minor league affiliate, the Hamilton Bulldogs of the AHL, he recorded 46 points over 77 games. Improving to 66 points with Hamilton in 2003–04, he also made his NHL debut that season, playing in two games. Due to the 2004–05 NHL lockout, Plekanec remained in Hamilton for a third AHL season and recorded 64 points over 80 games.

In 2005–06, Plekanec became a fixture in the Canadiens' lineup, scoring 29 points in his NHL rookie season. He improved to 47 points the next season in 2006–07 and notched his first 20-goal effort. On 29 February 2008, Plekanec recorded his first NHL hat-trick in a 6–2 victory over the Buffalo Sabres. He completed the 2007–08 season with 29 goals and 69 points. Plekanec received a two-game suspension on 12 February 2009, for a slewfoot on Edmonton Oilers defenceman Denis Grebeshkov during a game the previous day. Grebeshkov suffered a high ankle sprain on the play. He finished with a decreased 39 points in 2008–09, but still managed to notch 20 goals.

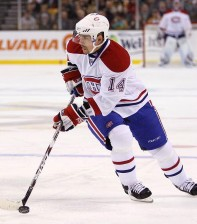
Plekanec with the Montreal Canadiens in April 2008

In the summer of 2009, he re-signed with the Canadiens to a one-year, $2.75 million contract. That season, he recorded a career-high 45 assists and 70 points. Set to become a free agent, he re-signed once more with the Canadiens on 22 June 2010, agreeing to a six-year, $30 million contract. He scored 22 goals during the 2010–11 season.

Plekanec signed with Kladno during the 2012–13 NHL lockout.

On 15 September 2014, Plekanec was named an alternate captain of the Canadiens, along with P. K. Subban, Max Pacioretty and Andrei Markov.

On 16 October 2015, Plekanec and the Canadiens agreed to a two-year, $12 million contract extension, signing him through until the end of the 2017–18 season.

The Canadiens struggled during the 2017–18 season, as they spent much of the year near the bottom of the league standings. As the trade deadline approached, rumours concerning a trade involving Plekanec began to circulate. He was held out of the lineup on 24 February (two days before the trade deadline) as a potential trade loomed. The following day, Plekanec (in the final year of his contract), was traded to the Toronto Maple Leafs, along with minor league player Kyle Baun in exchange for Kerby Rychel, Rinat Valiev and a second-round pick in 2018. During the opening round of the playoffs against the Boston Bruins, following a three-game suspension to Nazem Kadri, Plekanec was placed on a line with Patrick Marleau and Mitch Marner. He scored two goals and four points in seven games, as the Maple Leafs were eliminated by the Bruins.

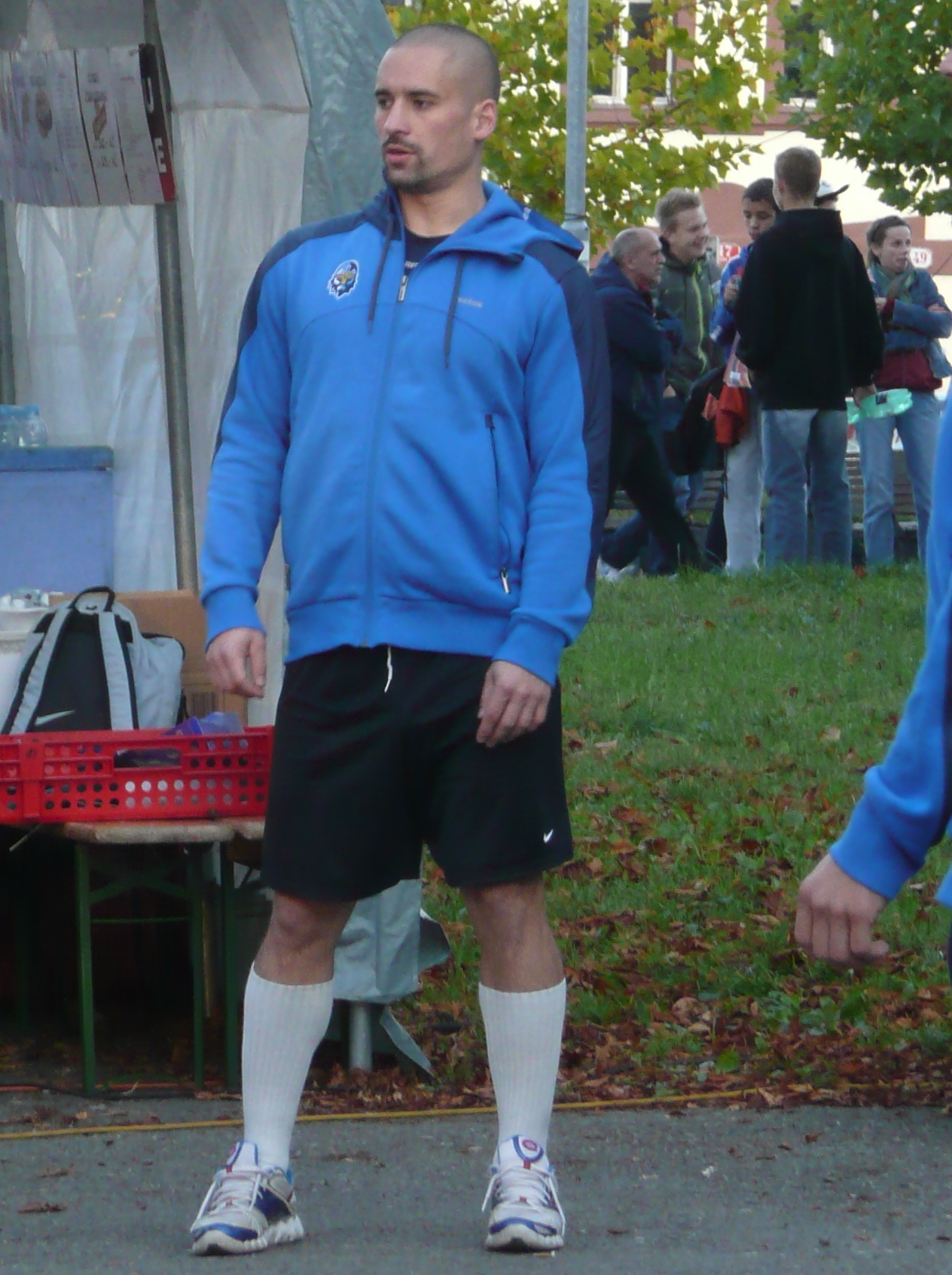
Tomáš Plekanec before a match in the Czech Extraleague on 11 October 2012, during the NHL lockout

On 1 July 2018, Plekanec returned to the Canadiens, signing a one-year, $2.25 million contract. On 15 October 2018, Plekanec played in his 1,000th regular season NHL game, where he scored his first goal of the season.

On 9 November 2018, the Canadiens announced that they would be placing Plekanec on unconditional waivers for the purpose of terminating his contract. The termination was a mutual decision, as Plekanec announced his retirement from the NHL on the same day.

On 26 November 2018, Plekanec signed with HC Kometa Brno of the Czech Extraliga (ELH) and additionally played for Rytíři Kladno of the 1st Czech Republic Hockey League. On 28 October 2023, Plekanec announced his retirement from playing for health reasons.

== International play ==
Medal record

Representing Czech Republic

Ice hockey

World Championships
Silver medal – second place	2006 Latvia	
Bronze medal – third place	2011 Slovakia	
Bronze medal – third place	2012 Finland	

World Junior Championships
Gold medal – first place	2001 Russia	

Plekanec played in three junior international tournaments with the Czech Republic. He was named to the under-18 team at the 2000 IIHF World U18 Championships, where he contributed two points in six games. He then helped the Czechs to a gold medal at the 2001 World Junior Championships with two points in seven games. He made his second consecutive World Junior appearance in 2002 and improved to seven points in seven games.

After his first NHL season, Plekanec competed in the 2006 World Championships, where the Czech Republic captured a silver medal in Latvia. Plekanec scored the Czechs' first goal in the semi-final, helping the team defeat Finland 3–1. He went on to make his second and third consecutive World Championships appearances in 2007 and 2008. He was a member of the bronze-medal Czech team in the 2011 World Championships.

On 31 December 2009, Plekanec was named to the Czech team for the 2010 Winter Olympics in Vancouver. He recorded three points in five games as the Czech Republic were defeated in the quarter-final by Finland. He has also competed for the Czech national inline hockey team.

On 6 January 2014, Plekanec was named captain of the Czech Republic team competing in the 2014 Winter Olympics.

== After retirement ==
Just days after announcing his retirement as a player, Plekanec was added to the coaching staff of the Czech national team on 1 November 2023. In 2024, he was an assistant coach of the Czech team that won the gold medal on home ice in Prague at the IIHF World Championship.

On 3 March 2025, Plekanec was introduced as the director of hockey operations for Rytíři Kladno. The announcement mentioned he would continue his coaching role on the Czech national team.

== Personal life ==
In 2019, Plekanec and Czech singer/actress Lucie Vondráčková divorced after seven years of marriage. Plekanec was granted the right to take his Canadian-born sons Matyáš and Adam to the Czech Republic rather than stay in Montreal as Vondráčková requested.

Plekanec has been in a relationship with professional tennis player Lucie Šafářová since August 2018, and on 4 July 2019, Safarova announced on her Instagram account that they are expecting their first child. Šafářová gave birth to their daughter Lea in December 2019. In September 2021, Plekanec and Šafářová married.

== Career statistics ==
=== Regular season and playoffs ===
			Regular season					Playoffs
Season	Team	League	GP	G	A	Pts	PIM	GP	G	A	Pts	PIM
1998–99	HC Velvana Kladno	CZE U20	53	22	20	42	—	—	—	—	—	—
1998–99	HC Velvana Kladno	ELH	3	0	0	0	0	—	—	—	—	—
1999–2000	HC Velvana Kladno	CZE U20	43	14	16	30	4	—	—	—	—	—
1999–2000	HK Lev Slaný	CZE.3	3	0	1	1	6	—	—	—	—	—
1999–2000	HK Kralupy nad Vltavou	CZE.3	6	2	2	4	2	—	—	—	—	—
2000–01	HC Vagnerplast Kladno	CZE U20	9	6	4	10	4	—	—	—	—	—
2000–01	HC Vagnerplast Kladno	ELH	47	9	9	18	24	—	—	—	—	—
2000–01	HC Mladá Boleslav	CZE.3	4	5	5	10	4	—	—	—	—	—
2001–02	HC Vagnerplast Kladno	ELH	48	7	16	23	28	—	—	—	—	—
2002–03	Hamilton Bulldogs	AHL	77	19	27	46	74	13	3	2	5	8
2003–04	Hamilton Bulldogs	AHL	74	23	43	66	90	10	2	5	7	6
2003–04	Montreal Canadiens	NHL	2	0	0	0	0	—	—	—	—	—
2004–05	Hamilton Bulldogs	AHL	80	29	35	64	68	4	2	4	6	6
2005–06	Hamilton Bulldogs	AHL	2	0	0	0	2	—	—	—	—	—
2005–06	Montreal Canadiens	NHL	67	9	20	29	32	6	0	4	4	6
2006–07	Montreal Canadiens	NHL	81	20	27	47	36	—	—	—	—	—
2007–08	Montreal Canadiens	NHL	81	29	40	69	38	12	4	5	9	2
2008–09	Montreal Canadiens	NHL	80	20	19	39	54	3	0	0	0	4
2009–10	Montreal Canadiens	NHL	82	25	45	70	50	19	4	7	11	20
2010–11	Montreal Canadiens	NHL	77	22	35	57	60	7	2	3	5	2
2011–12	Montreal Canadiens	NHL	81	17	35	52	56	—	—	—	—	—
2012–13	Rytíři Kladno	ELH	32	21	25	46	38	—	—	—	—	—
2012–13	Montreal Canadiens	NHL	47	14	19	33	24	5	0	4	4	2
2013–14	Montreal Canadiens	NHL	81	20	23	43	38	17	4	5	9	8
2014–15	Montreal Canadiens	NHL	82	26	34	60	46	12	1	3	4	6
2015–16	Montreal Canadiens	NHL	82	14	40	54	36	—	—	—	—	—
2016–17	Montreal Canadiens	NHL	78	10	18	28	24	6	1	2	3	0
2017–18	Montreal Canadiens	NHL	60	6	18	24	39	—	—	—	—	—
2017–18	Toronto Maple Leafs	NHL	17	0	2	2	6	7	2	2	4	2
2018–19	Montreal Canadiens	NHL	3	1	0	1	0	—	—	—	—	—
2018–19	Rytíři Kladno	CZE.2	10	5	7	12	12	10	4	11	15	14
2018–19	HC Kometa Brno	ELH	16	0	7	7	14	—	—	—	—	—
2019–20	HC Kometa Brno	ELH	50	13	20	33	68	—	—	—	—	—
2020–21	Rytíři Kladno	CZE.2	33	15	19	34	52	16	6	11	17	2
2021–22	Rytíři Kladno	ELH	56	17	36	53	46	—	—	—	—	—
2022–23	Rytíři Kladno	ELH	52	16	33	49	34	16	6	11	17	2
2023–24	Rytíři Kladno	ELH	9	1	3	4	14	—	—	—	—	—
NHL totals			1,001	233	375	608	543	94	18	35	53	52

=== International ===
Year	Team	Event	Result	GP	G	A	Pts	PIM
2000	Czech Republic	WJC18	6th	6	1	1	2	2
2001	Czech Republic	WJC	1st place, gold medalist(s)	7	1	1	2	6
2002	Czech Republic	WJC	7th	7	3	4	7	0
2006	Czech Republic	WC	2nd place, silver medalist(s)	9	3	0	3	20
2007	Czech Republic	WC	7th	7	4	4	8	2
2008	Czech Republic	WC	5th	4	0	3	3	2
2009	Czech Republic	WC	6th	7	0	1	1	4
2010	Czech Republic	OG	7th	5	2	1	3	2
2011	Czech Republic	WC	3rd place, bronze medalist(s)	8	6	4	10	6
2012	Czech Republic	WC	3rd place, bronze medalist(s)	10	1	6	7	4
2013	Czech Republic	WC	7th	2	0	4	4	2
2014	Czech Republic	OG	6th	5	1	3	4	0
2015	Czech Republic	WC	4th	2	0	0	0	0
2016	Czech Republic	WC	5th	8	5	0	5	8
2016	Czech Republic	WCH	6th	3	0	0	0	0
2017	Czech Republic	WC	7th	8	0	0	0	4
2018	Czech Republic	WC	7th	8	0	1	1	2
Junior totals				20	5	6	11	8
Senior totals				86	22	27	49	56

== See also ==
- List of NHL players with 1,000 games played
