= Vráblík =

Vráblík or Vrablik (feminine: Vráblíková) is a Czech surname. Notable people with the surname include:

- Martin Vráblík (born 1982), Czech alpine skier
- Roman Vráblík, Czech ice hockey player
