= Jan Jaroměřský =

Czech ice hockey player

- Born: September 10, 1988 (age 36); Turnov, Czechoslovakia
- Height: 5 ft 11 in (180 cm)
- Weight: 185 lb (84 kg; 13 st 3 lb)
- Position: Defence
- Shoots: Left
- ELH team Former teams: HC Oceláři Třinec; HC Olomouc
- Playing career: 2008–present

Jan Jaroměřský (born September 10, 1988) is a Czech professional ice hockey defenceman for HC Oceláři Třinec of the Czech Extraliga.

Jaroměřský previously played for HC Olomouc, joining the team in 2013 and helped them win promotion to the Czech Extraliga that season. He would go on to play 261 games for Olomouc over the next seven seasons. On April 30, 2020, Jaroměřský moved to HC Oceláři Třinec.
