= Radek Smoleňák =

Czech ice hockey player

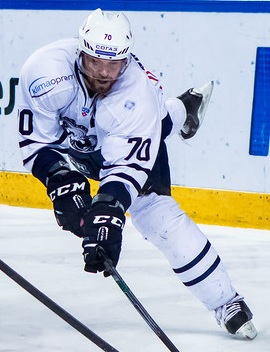
- Born: December 3, 1986 (age 39) Prague, Czechoslovakia
- Height: 6 ft 3 in (191 cm)
- Weight: 214 lb (97 kg; 15 st 4 lb)
- Position: Left wing
- Shot: Left
- ELH team Former teams: Rytíři Kladno; Tampa Bay Lightning; Chicago Blackhawks; HC Sparta Praha; HC Kladno; Ässät Pori; Lahti Pelicans; Torpedo Nizhny Novgorod; Timrå IK; HC Ugra; TPS; MoDo Hockey; KHL Medveščak Zagreb; HC Slovan Bratislava; Mountfield HK
- National team: Czech Republic
- NHL draft: 73rd overall, 2005; Tampa Bay Lightning
- Playing career: 2006–2026

Radek Smoleňák (born December 3, 1986) is a Czech former professional ice hockey winger. He last played with the Rytíři Kladno of the Czech Extraliga. Smoleňák was selected by the Tampa Bay Lightning in the 3rd round (73rd overall) of the 2005 NHL entry draft.

== Playing career ==
Smoleňák played briefly with the Chicago Blackhawks in the 2009–10 season when he was claimed off waivers by the team late in the pre-season. He played in only one regular season game with the Blackhawks, in which he registered a five-minute major for fighting. He also participated in the 2009 pre-season with Chicago while they played in Zürich, Switzerland and registered one goal in one game. After being placed back on waivers by the Blackhawks, he was quickly re-claimed by the Tampa Bay Lightning on October 11, 2009.

Smoleňák signed a contract with Lahti Pelicans from the Finnish elite league SM-liiga on January 30, 2012.

In 2009, Smoleňák received significant fan support in the NHL voting for the 57th National Hockey League All-Star Game compiling 10,471 fan votes as a write-in candidate.

== Career statistics ==
=== Regular season and playoffs ===
			Regular season					Playoffs
Season	Team	League	GP	G	A	Pts	PIM	GP	G	A	Pts	PIM
2000–01	HC Vagnerplast Kladno	CZE U18	3	0	0	0	0	—	—	—	—	—
2001–02	HC Vagnerplast Kladno	CZE U18	35	21	13	34	16	—	—	—	—	—
2002–03	HC Vagnerplast Kladno	CZE U18	41	39	27	66	52	9	7	3	10	18
2002–03	HC Vagnerplast Kladno	CZE U20	4	2	0	2	6	—	—	—	—	—
2003–04	HC Rabat Kladno	CZE U20	54	27	25	52	53	7	3	4	7	0
2004–05	Kingston Frontenacs	OHL	67	32	28	60	58	—	—	—	—	—
2005–06	Kingston Frontenacs	OHL	65	42	42	84	109	6	1	3	4	20
2006–07	Johnstown Chiefs	ECHL	43	15	20	35	35	1	0	0	0	0
2006–07	Springfield Falcons	AHL	20	0	1	1	8	—	—	—	—	—
2007–08	Norfolk Admirals	AHL	56	15	11	26	108	—	—	—	—	—
2007–08	Mississippi Sea Wolves	ECHL	19	7	8	15	14	—	—	—	—	—
2008–09	Norfolk Admirals	AHL	71	24	25	49	165	—	—	—	—	—
2008–09	Tampa Bay Lightning	NHL	6	0	1	1	10	—	—	—	—	—
2009–10	Chicago Blackhawks	NHL	1	0	0	0	5	—	—	—	—	—
2009–10	Norfolk Admirals	AHL	39	7	14	21	49	—	—	—	—	—
2009–10	Abbotsford Heat	AHL	21	2	4	6	26	—	—	—	—	—
2010–11	HC Sparta Praha	ELH	42	14	2	16	20	—	—	—	—	—
2010–11	HC Vagnerplast Kladno	ELH	6	1	1	2	14	—	—	—	—	—
2011–12	Ässät	SM-l	42	14	10	24	18	—	—	—	—	—
2011–12	Lahti Pelicans	SM-l	15	5	8	13	12	17	8	3	11	14
2012–13	Lahti Pelicans	SM-l	32	18	10	28	22	—	—	—	—	—
2012–13	Torpedo Nizhny Novgorod	KHL	7	1	0	1	0	—	—	—	—	—
2012–13	Timrå IK	SEL	9	3	2	5	6	—	—	—	—	—
2013–14	Lahti Pelicans	Liiga	21	14	5	19	20	—	—	—	—	—
2013–14	HC Ugra	KHL	28	5	9	14	12	—	—	—	—	—
2014–15	TPS	Liiga	31	13	10	23	45	—	—	—	—	—
2014–15	MoDo Hockey	SHL	23	4	5	9	12	—	—	—	—	—
2015–16	KHL Medveščak Zagreb	KHL	59	16	19	35	14	—	—	—	—	—
2016–17	HC Slovan Bratislava	KHL	13	5	6	11	16	—	—	—	—	—
2017–18	HC Slovan Bratislava	KHL	24	5	14	19	14	—	—	—	—	—
2017–18	Mountfield HK	ELH	12	6	3	9	6	13	5	2	7	10
2018–19	Mountfield HK	ELH	38	12	22	34	44	4	0	0	0	16
2018–19	SC Rapperswil–Jona Lakers	NL	7	1	1	2	0	—	—	—	—	—
2019–20	Mountfield HK	ELH	52	23	14	37	38	2	0	1	1	0
2020–21	Mountfield HK	ELH	51	20	15	35	52	6	1	1	2	4
2021–22	Mountfield HK	ELH	56	15	20	35	49	5	2	0	2	2
2022–23	Mountfield HK	ELH	26	7	2	9	31	13	1	2	3	8
2023–24	Mountfield HK	ELH	1	0	0	0	0	—	—	—	—	—
2023–24	Rytíři Kladno	ELH	45	18	11	29	24	—	—	—	—	—
NHL totals			7	0	1	1	15	—	—	—	—	—
ELH totals			329	116	90	206	278	43	9	6	15	40
KHL totals			131	32	48	80	56	—	—	—	—	—

=== International ===
Year	Team	Event	Result	GP	G	A	Pts	PIM
2004	Czech Republic	WJC18	7th	5	0	1	1	0
2015	Czech Republic	WC	6th	6	0	0	0	2
Junior totals				5	0	1	1	0
Senior totals				6	0	0	0	2
