= Ondrusek =

Ondrusek is a surname from the Czech Republic and Slovakia, where it may be spelled Ondrušek, Ondrúšek, or Ondrůšek. The corresponding feminine forms are Ondrušková, Ondrúšková, and Ondrůšková.

Notable people with this surname include:

- Jiří Ondrušek (born 1986) Czech ice hockey player
- Logan Ondrusek (born 1985), American baseball pitcher
