= 1977–78 Porin Ässät season =

SM-liiga team season

1977–78 Porin Ässät
- SM-liiga champions
- League: 2nd SM-liiga
- 1977–78 record: 24–2–10
- Goals for: 194
- Goals against: 121

Team information
- Coach: Lasse Heikkilä
- Captain: Veli-Pekka Ketola
- Arena: Pori Ice Hall

Team leaders
- Goals: Veli-Pekka Ketola (27)
- Assists: Tapio Koskinen (30)
- Points: Veli-Pekka Ketola (56)
- Penalty minutes: Veli-Pekka Ketola (59)
- Plus/minus: Pekka Rautakallio (35)

The 1977–78 Porin Ässät season was the club's third season in the SM-liiga and the 11th season at the top-level ice hockey league in Finland. Ässät finished 2nd in the regular season, two points behind Tappara. Ässät beat Tappara 3–1 in the final series to become the Finnish champions for the 2nd time in the club's history. The win also secured Ässät a spot in the 1978–79 IIHF European Cup, in which they won bronze.

== Regular season ==
The 1977–78 season again raised hopes of success when Pekka Rautakallio and Veli-Pekka Ketola returned to Ässät from North America. In addition, promising young people played in the club, such as Arto Javanainen, Kari Makkonen, Tapio Levo and Harry Nikander.

Ässät's regular season started with a 7–1 victory over Kiekko-Reipas. Ässät's biggest victory in the season came in a Satakunnan derby rivalry match against Rauman Lukko, when Ässät beat them 17–3 at home. Ässät finished second in the regular season after Tappara and defeated TPS 3–2 in the semi-finals. The final series against Tappara did not start promisingly, as Tappara won the first match in Tampere 8–0. However, Ässät won the rest of the games, and the club achieved its second Finnish Championship. The last match at the Pori Ice Hall was estimated to have been attended by more than 14,000 spectators, even though only 8,600 spectators should have been allowed into the arena at that time. The violation was taken into court. There were more spectators in the auditorium than in any other previous hockey match played in Finland. In the early years of the SM-liiga in the second half of the 1970s, Ässät was one of the league's absolute top teams. The most important player on the team was the captain, center Veli-Pekka Ketola, who had returned from the North American WHA League. Ketola broke the point record in the playoffs at the time.

== IIHF European Cup 1978–79 ==
By winning the SM-liiga championship, Ässät qualified for the 1978–79 IIHF European Cup, directly to the fourth round. Ässät beat Podhale Nowy Targ 7–2 and advanced straight to the final series with four other teams. Ässät's first game in the final series ended in a 3–8 loss to Poldi Kladno. The second game Ässät lost 3–12 against CSKA Moscow, but by beating Skellefteå AIK 3–2 in the 3rd match, Ässät barely finished third place and won bronze.
