= Marko Daňo =

Slovak ice hockey player (born 1994)

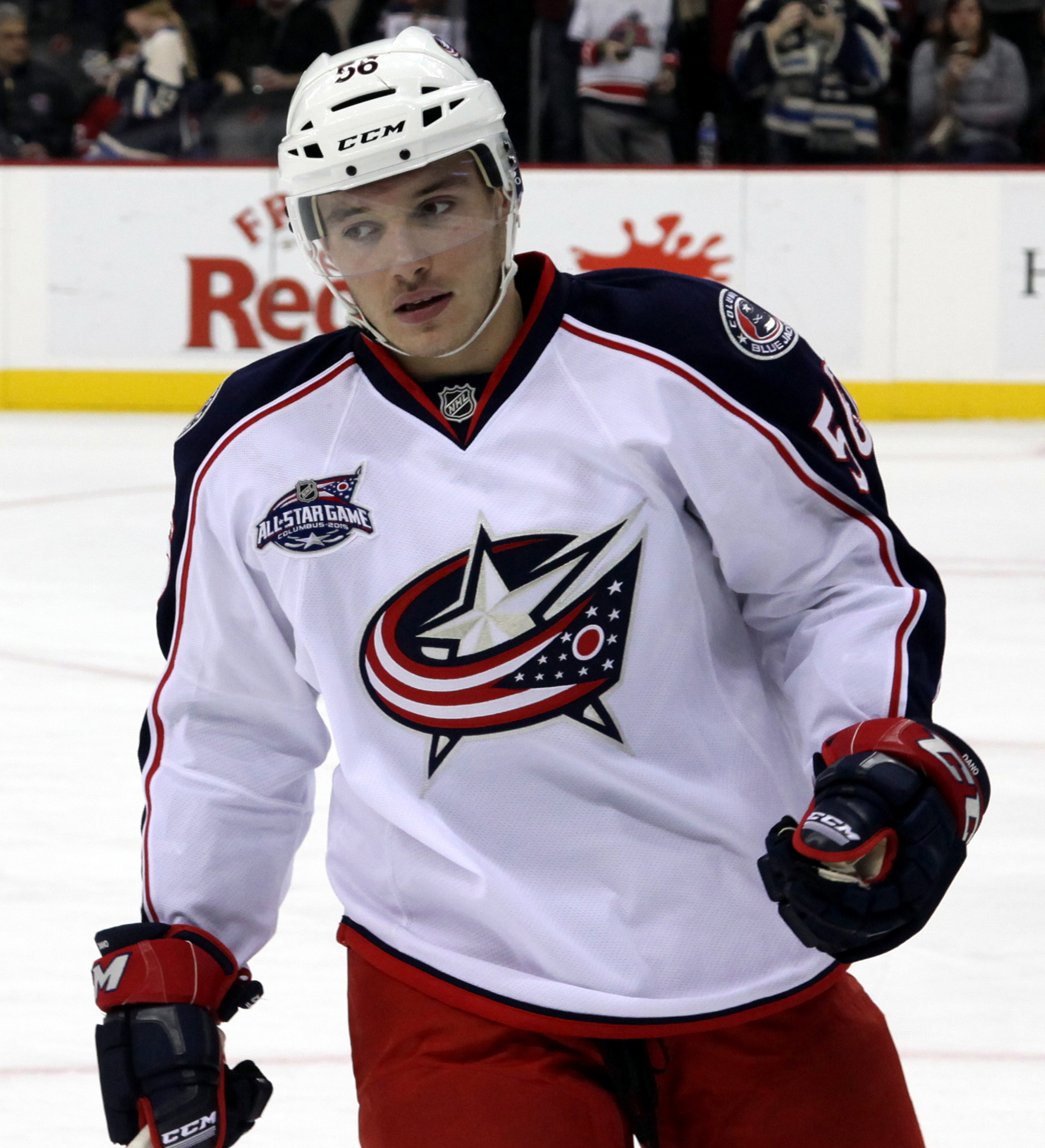
- Dano with the Columbus Blue Jackets in 2014
- Born: 30 November 1994 (age 31) Eisenstadt, Austria
- Height: 5 ft 11 in (180 cm)
- Weight: 215 lb (98 kg; 15 st 5 lb)
- Position: Wing
- Shoots: Left
- ELH team Former teams: HC Oceláři Třinec; Slovan Bratislava; Columbus Blue Jackets; Chicago Blackhawks; Winnipeg Jets; Colorado Avalanche; HK Dukla Trenčín
- National team: Slovakia
- NHL draft: 27th overall, 2013; Columbus Blue Jackets
- Playing career: 2014–present

Marko Daňo (born 30 November 1994) is an Austrian-born Slovak professional ice hockey right winger for HC Oceláři Třinec of the Czech Extraliga (ELH). He was originally drafted by the Columbus Blue Jackets in the first round, 27th overall, at the 2013 NHL entry draft and made his NHL debut in 2014. Before playing in the NHL, Daňo played professionally for Slovan Bratislava of the Kontinental Hockey League (KHL) for two seasons.

Daňo's father, Jozef Daňo, was also an ice hockey player and played for the Slovak national team at the 1994 and 1998 Winter Olympics.

== Playing career ==
Daňo played in the 2007 Quebec International Pee-Wee Hockey Tournament with a youth team from Bratislava. He was ranked twelfth among International Skaters by the NHL Central Scouting Services in their final rankings for the 2013 NHL entry draft. He was selected in the first round, 27th overall by the Columbus Blue Jackets. Daňo returned to Slovan Bratislava of the Kontinental Hockey League (KHL) for the 2013–14 season. On 14 March 2014, the Blue Jackets signed Daňo to a three-year, entry-level contract.

Daňo made his NHL debut on 9 October 2014, against the Buffalo Sabres and scored his first career NHL goal, assist and point two days later, on 11 October, his second game, against the New York Rangers. He played eight games with Columbus to begin the 2014–15 season before being assigned to the Springfield Falcons, the Blue Jackets' American Hockey League (AHL) affiliate. In February 2015, however, he was recalled to Columbus, where he played for the rest of regular season. Daňo finished the NHL season with eight goals and 13 assists (21 points) in 35 games played, as well as the AHL season with 11 goals and eight assists (19 points) in 39 games.

On 30 June 2015, Daňo, along with Jeremy Morin, Artem Anisimov and Corey Tropp, were traded to the Chicago Blackhawks in exchange for Brandon Saad, Alex Broadhurst and Michael Paliotta. After attending the Blackhawks training camp in preparation for the 2015–16 season, Daňo as a key piece in the Saad trade was surprisingly reassigned to AHL affiliate, the Rockford IceHogs to begin the year and continue his development. On 2 November 2015, Daňo was recalled by the Blackhawks to the NHL. He made his Chicago debut that night in a 4–2 victory against the Los Angeles Kings. He featured in 13 games with the Blackhawks scoring a goal and an assist before he was returned to the IceHogs.

On 25 February 2016, Daňo and the Blackhawks' first-round pick in the 2016 NHL entry draft was traded to the Winnipeg Jets in exchange for Andrew Ladd, Jay Harrison and Matt Fraser. In 21 games for the Jets, he recorded four goals and eight points in 21 games. In the following season, Daňo had eleven points in 38 games. He also skated six games for the team's AHL affiliate, the Manitoba Moose. On 13 June 2017, the Jets re-signed Daňo to a one-year contract worth $850,000. On 24 July 2018, Daňo re-signed with the Jets, to a one-year contract, worth $800,000.

After beginning the 2018–19 season as a healthy scratch, on 14 October 2018, the Jets placed Daňo on waivers. He was claimed by division rivals, the Colorado Avalanche the following day. Daňo went scoreless in eight games for the club with seven penalty minutes before on 22 November, he was placed back on waivers. The following day, he re-joined the Jets when they claimed him and was immediately reassigned to the AHL to join the Manitoba Moose. In remaining in the AHL for the remainder of the season, Daňo contributed with 12 goals and 30 points in 51 games for the Moose.

On 25 June 2019, Daňo's tenure with the Jets ended after he was not tendered a qualifying offer, releasing him as a free agent. He signed a one-year, two-way contract with the Blue Jackets on 8 August. In his return to the Blue Jackets in the 2019–20 season, Daňo spent the majority of his contract in the AHL with the Cleveland Monsters, recording four goals and 19 points in 46 regular season games. He added three games to his NHL totals, appearing with the Blue Jackets for the first time since 2015.

After failing to receive a qualifying offer for the second consecutive season, Daňo remained in Europe, returning to his original hometown club, HK Dukla Trenčín of the Tipsport Liga, signing a contract with an NHL-out clause on 4 October 2020. On 6 November 2020, Daňo secured a one-year, two-way contract for a third stint within the Winnipeg Jets organization. Unable to add to his NHL experience with the Jets, Daňo was assigned to the AHL and played in 13 games throughout the 2020–21 season with the Manitoba Moose.

As a free agent in the off-season, Daňo returned to Europe by signing an initial two-month contract with the option of a one-year deal with Czech-based club HC Oceláři Třinec of the ELH on 6 September 2021.

== International play ==
Medal record

Ice hockey

Representing Slovakia

Olympic Games
Bronze medal – third place	2022 Beijing	Men's tournament

Daňo participated at the 2012 World Junior Ice Hockey Championships for Slovakia, as well as at the 2013 and 2015 IIHF World Championship as a member of the Slovak men's team.

== Personal life ==
Dano was born in Eisenstadt, Austria, but grew up in Trenčín, Slovakia.

== Career statistics ==
=== Regular season and playoffs ===
			Regular season					Playoffs
Season	Team	League	GP	G	A	Pts	PIM	GP	G	A	Pts	PIM
2008–09	Dukla Trenčín	SVK U18	5	1	0	1	14	—	—	—	—	—
2009–10	Dukla Trenčín	SVK U18	36	13	12	25	77	—	—	—	—	—
2010–11	Dukla Trenčín	SVK U18	9	13	4	17	2	—	—	—	—	—
2010–11	Dukla Trenčín	SVK U20	28	18	22	40	86	8	4	2	6	14
2010–11	Dukla Trenčín	SVK	8	0	1	1	10	3	0	0	0	0
2011–12	Dukla Trenčín	SVK U20	3	3	1	4	18	3	4	2	6	4
2011–12	Dukla Trenčín	SVK	32	4	6	10	12	9	0	3	3	18
2011–12	HK Orange 20	SVK.2	10	4	5	9	22	—	—	—	—	—
2012–13	Slovan Bratislava	KHL	37	3	4	7	26	4	0	0	0	4
2012–13	Slovan Bratislava	SVK U20	—	—	—	—	—	2	0	0	0	0
2013–14	Slovan Bratislava	KHL	41	3	2	5	41	—	—	—	—	—
2013–14	Springfield Falcons	AHL	10	2	4	6	4	5	0	2	2	0
2014–15	Columbus Blue Jackets	NHL	35	8	13	21	14	—	—	—	—	—
2014–15	Springfield Falcons	AHL	39	11	8	19	34	—	—	—	—	—
2015–16	Rockford IceHogs	AHL	34	4	19	23	40	—	—	—	—	—
2015–16	Chicago Blackhawks	NHL	13	1	1	2	2	—	—	—	—	—
2015–16	Winnipeg Jets	NHL	21	4	4	8	8	—	—	—	—	—
2016–17	Manitoba Moose	AHL	6	0	2	2	4	—	—	—	—	—
2016–17	Winnipeg Jets	NHL	38	4	7	11	10	—	—	—	—	—
2017–18	Winnipeg Jets	NHL	23	2	1	3	6	—	—	—	—	—
2018–19	Colorado Avalanche	NHL	8	0	0	0	7	—	—	—	—	—
2018–19	Manitoba Moose	AHL	51	12	18	30	75	—	—	—	—	—
2019–20	Cleveland Monsters	AHL	46	4	15	19	86	—	—	—	—	—
2019–20	Columbus Blue Jackets	NHL	3	0	0	0	2	—	—	—	—	—
2020–21	Dukla Trenčín	SVK	2	2	1	3	4	—	—	—	—	—
2020–21	Manitoba Moose	AHL	13	1	2	3	10	—	—	—	—	—
2021–22	HC Oceláři Třinec	ELH	36	10	6	16	48	12	3	0	3	2
2022–23	HC Oceláři Třinec	ELH	51	29	22	51	36	20	3	6	9	14
2023–24	HC Oceláři Třinec	ELH	26	13	13	26	16	21	6	6	12	19
2024–25	HC Oceláři Třinec	ELH	44	19	7	26	65	7	1	2	3	48
2025–26	HC Oceláři Třinec	ELH	33	14	7	21	64	13	1	4	5	10
KHL totals			86	6	6	12	73	4	0	0	0	4
NHL totals			141	19	26	45	49	—	—	—	—	—
ELH totals			190	85	55	140	229	73	14	18	32	93

=== International ===
Year	Team	Event	Result	GP	G	A	Pts	PIM
2011	Slovakia	WJC18	10th	6	1	3	4	14
2011	Slovakia	IH18	8th	4	0	1	1	0
2012	Slovakia	WJC	6th	6	1	2	3	6
2012	Slovakia	WJC18 D1A	12th	5	10	3	13	10
2013	Slovakia	WJC	8th	6	4	5	9	12
2013	Slovakia	WC	8th	5	1	1	2	2
2014	Slovakia	WJC	8th	5	2	1	3	4
2015	Slovakia	WC	9th	5	1	0	1	2
2016	Slovakia	WC	9th	6	1	1	2	8
2019	Slovakia	WC	9th	7	0	1	1	4
2021	Slovakia	OGQ	Q	3	0	0	0	2
2022	Slovakia	OG	3rd place, bronze medalist(s)	6	0	0	0	4
2024	Slovakia	WC	7th	5	0	0	0	2
Junior totals				32	18	15	33	46
Senior totals				37	3	3	6	24

Awards and achievements
Preceded by Kerby Rychel	Columbus Blue Jackets first-round draft pick 2013	Succeeded by Sonny Milano
