= 1976–77 IIHF European Cup =

European ice hockey tournament

The 1976–77 European Cup was the 12th edition of the European Cup, IIHF's premier European club ice hockey tournament. The season started on October 12, 1976, and finished on February 13, 1979.

The tournament was won by Poldi Kladno, who beat Spartak Moscow in the final

== First round ==
Team #1	Score	Team #2
Levski-Spartak Sofia (Bulgaria)	2:4, 1:5	(Socialist Federal Republic of Yugoslavia) HK Olimpija Ljubljana
HC Chamonix (France)	2:10, 2:8	(Switzerland) SC Langnau
Berliner SC (West Germany)	11:1, 3:4	(Italy) HC Gherdëina
Tilburg Trappers (Netherlands)	6:1, 8:5	(Denmark) KSF København

(Poland) Podhale Nowy Targ, (Norway) IF Frisk, (East Germany) Dynamo Berlin, (Austria) EC KAC : bye

== Second round ==
Team #1	Score	Team #2
EC KAC (Austria)	5:1, 4:5	(Socialist Federal Republic of Yugoslavia) HK Olimpija Ljubljana
Tilburg Trappers (Netherlands)	5:6, 4:7	(Switzerland) SC Langnau
Berliner SC (West Germany)	8:2, 4:3	(East Germany) Dynamo Berlin
Podhale Nowy Targ (Poland)	w/o	(Norway) IF Frisk

(Sweden) Brynäs IF, (Finland) TPS, (Czechoslovakia) Poldi Kladno, (Soviet Union) Spartak Moscow : bye

== Quarterfinals ==
Team #1	Score	Team #2
Berliner SC (West Germany)	1:3, 2:3	(Sweden) Brynäs IF
SC Langnau (Switzerland)	3:3, 1:10	(Finland) TPS
EC KAC (Austria)	5:12, 3:10	(Soviet Union) Spartak Moscow
Poldi Kladno (Czechoslovakia)	w/o	(Poland) Podhale Nowy Targ

== Semifinals ==
Team #1	Score	Team #2
TPS (Finland)	5:4, 2:7	(Czechoslovakia) Poldi Kladno
Brynäs IF (Sweden)	1:3, 1:7	(Soviet Union) Spartak Moscow

== Finals ==
Team #1	Score	Team #2
Spartak Moscow (Soviet Union)	4:4, 4:4 (1:2 PS)	(Czechoslovakia) Poldi Kladno
