= 1978–79 IIHF European Cup =

European ice hockey tournament

The 1978–79 European Cup was the 14th edition of the European Cup, IIHF's premier European club ice hockey tournament. The season started on September 12, 1978, and finished on August 29, 1979.

The tournament was won by CSKA Moscow, who won the final group.

== First round ==
Team #1	Score	Team #2
CH Casco Viejo Bilbao (Spain)	3:9, 2:21	(Netherlands) Feenstra Flyers
ATSE Graz (Austria)	4:1, 5:3	(Hungary) Ferencvárosi TC
Gap HC (France)	4:8, 5:15	(Italy) HC Bolzano
Rødovre SIK (Denmark)	2:2, 3:7	(Norway) Manglerud/Star
HC Steaua București (Romania)	6:1, 7:2	(Bulgaria) Levski-Spartak Sofia
Dynamo Berlin (East Germany)	5:6, 2:7	(Poland) Podhale Nowy Targ
EHC Biel (Switzerland)	15:1, 7:6	(Socialist Federal Republic of Yugoslavia) HK Jesenice

(West Germany) SC Riessersee : bye

== Second round ==
Team #1	Score	Team #2
Feenstra Flyers (Netherlands)	3:3, 6:10	(West Germany) SC Riessersee
HC Steaua București (Romania)	8:5, 2:5 (4:3 PS)	(Switzerland) EHC Biel
HC Bolzano (Italy)	1:3, 3:6	(Austria) ATSE Graz
Manglerud/Star (Norway)	2:3, 2:13	(Poland) Podhale Nowy Targ

== Third round ==
Team #1	Score	Team #2
ATSE Graz (Austria)	8:7, 4:4	(West Germany) SC Riessersee
Podhale Nowy Targ (Poland)	3:1, 3:1	(Romania) HC Steaua București

(Finland) Ässät, (Sweden) Skellefteå AIK : bye

== Fourth round ==
Team #1	Score	Team #2
Ässät (Finland)	7:2	(Poland) Podhale Nowy Targ
Skellefteå AIK (Sweden)	w/o	(Austria) ATSE Graz

(Czechoslovakia) Poldi Kladno, (Soviet Union) CSKA Moscow : bye

== Final Group ==
(Innsbruck, Tyrol, Austria)

Team #1	Score	Team #2
Poldi Kladno (Czechoslovakia)	8:3	(Finland) Ässät
CSKA Moscow (Soviet Union)	6:1	(Sweden) Skellefteå AIK
Skellefteå AIK (Sweden)	4:4	(Czechoslovakia) Poldi Kladno
CSKA Moscow (Soviet Union)	12:3	(Finland) Ässät
Ässät (Finland)	3:2	(Sweden) Skellefteå AIK
CSKA Moscow (Soviet Union)	3:1	(Czechoslovakia) Poldi Kladno

The final match also counted as the final of the 1977–78 IIHF European Cup which had still not been played. CSKA secured both titles by winning the match.

=== Final group standings ===
Rank	Team	Points
1	(Soviet Union) CSKA Moscow	6
2	(Czechoslovakia) Poldi Kladno	3
3	(Finland) Ässät, Porin Ässät	2
4	(Sweden) Skellefteå AIK	1
