= Tomáš Dujsík =

Czech ice hockey player

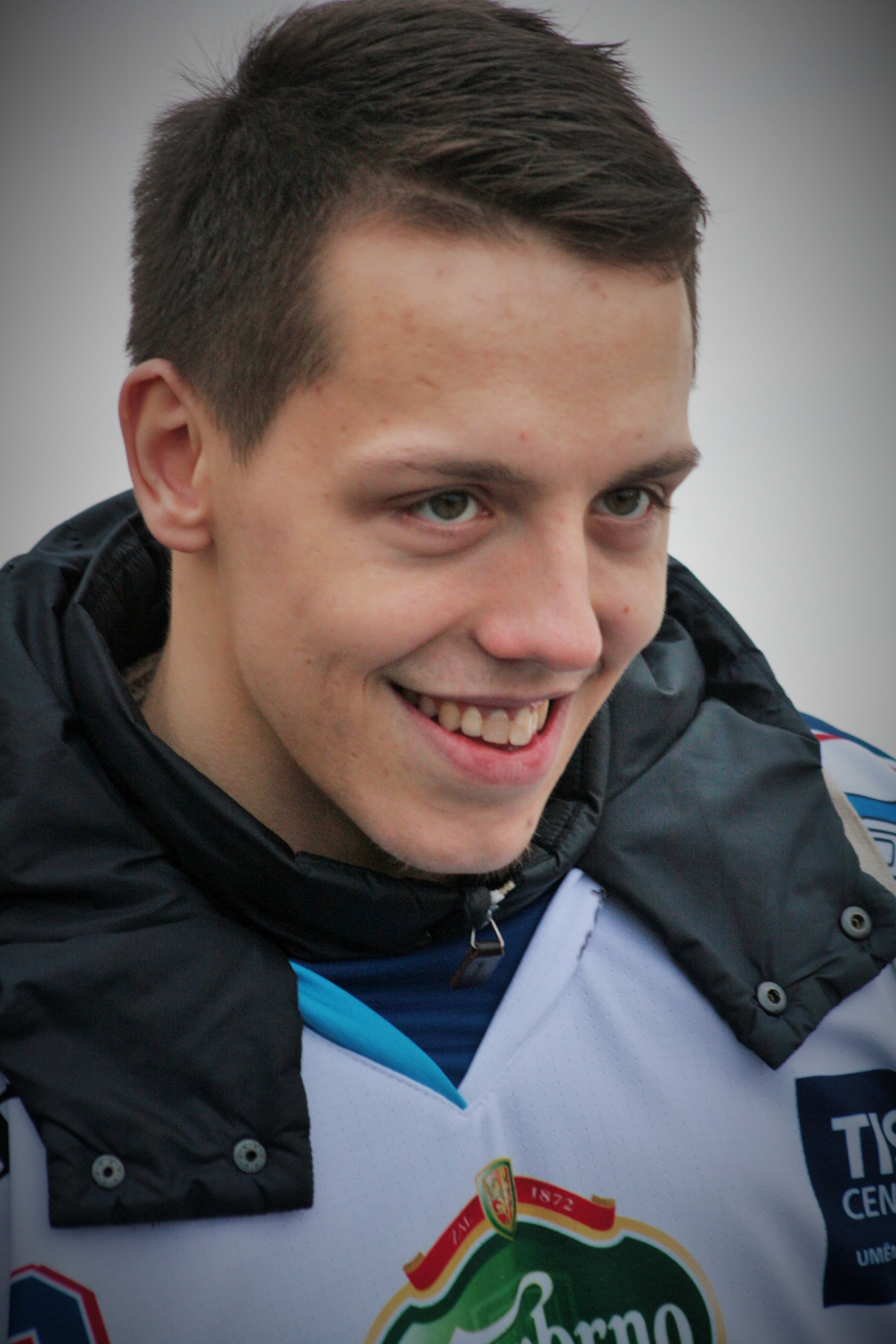
- Tomáš Dujsík
- Born: November 3, 1992 (age 33) Brno, Czechoslovakia
- Height: 6 ft 1 in (185 cm)
- Weight: 183 lb (83 kg; 13 st 1 lb)
- Position: Defence
- Shoots: Right
- ELH team Former teams: HC Olomouc; HC Kometa Brno
- NHL draft: Undrafted
- Playing career: 2012–present

Tomáš Dujsík (born November 3, 1992) is a Czech professional ice hockey defenceman. He currently plays with HC Olomouc in the Czech Extraliga.

Dujsík made his Czech Extraliga debut playing with HC Kometa Brno debut during the 2012–13 Czech Extraliga season.
