= Jan Knotek =

Czech ice hockey forward

- Born: October 8, 1987 (age 37); Prague, Czechoslovakia
- Height: 6 ft 2 in (188 cm)
- Weight: 209 lb (95 kg; 14 st 13 lb)
- Position: Forward
- Shoots: Left
- ELH team: HC Olomouc
- Playing career: 2004–present

Jan Knotek (born October 8, 1987) is a Czech professional ice hockey forward for HC Olomouc of the Czech Extraliga.

Knotek began his career with HC Kobra Praha of the Czech 2.liga for four seasons, from 2004 to 2008, before joining BK Havlíčkův Brod of the WSM Liga, where he played from 2008 to 2013. He was loaned out to fellow WSM Liga side HC Olomouc on February 2, 2013 and helped the team win promotion to the Czech Extraliga for the first time since 1997. He would join Olomouc permanently for the following season.

Knotek signed a new three-year contract with Olomouc on March 29, 2018.
