= 1977–78 IIHF European Cup =

European ice hockey tournament

The 1977–78 European Cup was the 13th edition of the European Cup, IIHF's premier European club ice hockey tournament. The season started on September 27, 1977, and was finished except for the final on September 3, 1978. The final was played on August 29, 1979, as part of the final stage of the following season's European Cup.

The tournament was won by CSKA Moscow, who beat Poldi Kladno in the final.

== First round ==
Team #1	Score	Team #2
Gap HC (France)	7:9, 3:14	(West Germany) Kölner EC
Dynamo Berlin (East Germany)	7:3, 4:4	(Poland) Podhale Nowy Targ
HC Steaua București (Romania)	3:2, 1:3	(Switzerland) SC Bern
EC KAC (Austria)	5:2, 5:3	(Hungary) Ferencvárosi TC
HC Bolzano (Italy)	6:2, 6:6	(Socialist Federal Republic of Yugoslavia) HK Jesenice
Manglerud/Star (Norway)	3:3, 6:7	(Netherlands) F Verwarming Heerenveen

(Finland) Tappara, (Sweden) Brynäs IF : bye

== Second round ==
Team #1	Score	Team #2
SC Bern (Switzerland)	7:3, 4:8 (0:2 PS)	(West Germany) Kölner EC
EC KAC (Austria)	5:5, 2:3	(Italy) HC Bolzano
Dynamo Berlin (East Germany)	7:7, 6:5	(Sweden) Brynäs IF
F Verwarming Heerenveen (Netherlands)	w/o	(Finland) Tappara

== Third round ==
Team #1	Score	Team #2
Dynamo Berlin (East Germany)	5:1, 6:2	(West Germany) Kölner EC
HC Bolzano (Italy)	4:2, 1:7	(Netherlands) F Verwarming Heerenveen

(Czechoslovakia) Poldi Kladno : bye

== Fourth round ==
Team #1	Score	Team #2
F Verwarming Heerenveen (Netherlands)	3:9, 5:13	(Czechoslovakia) Poldi Kladno

(East Germany) Dynamo Berlin : bye

== Semifinals ==
Team #1	Score	Team #2
Dynamo Berlin (East Germany)	5:5, 2:9	(Czechoslovakia) Poldi Kladno

(Soviet Union) CSKA Moscow : bye

== Final ==
Team #1	Score	Team #2
CSKA Moscow (Soviet Union)	3:1	(Czechoslovakia) Poldi Kladno

The final had not been played in 1978. When the teams met in the final stage of the 1978–79 IIHF European Cup, they agreed to also count their match for the 1977−78 cup. It was the final and deciding match of the 1978–79 cup as well.
