= Dalibor Řezníček =

Czech ice hockey player

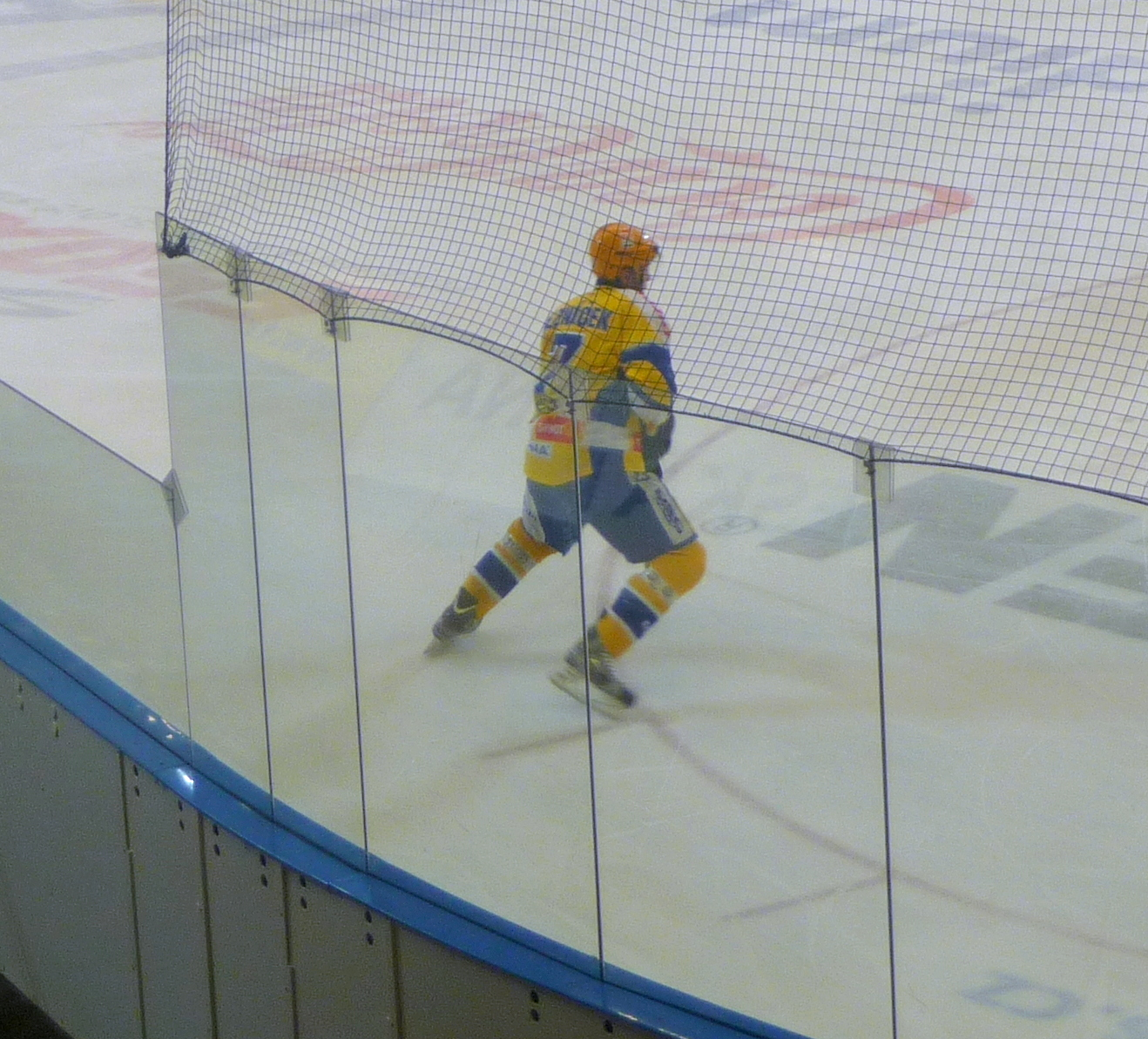
- Born: August 25, 1991 (age 33); Uherský Brod, Czechoslovakia
- Height: 6 ft 0 in (183 cm)
- Weight: 187 lb (85 kg; 13 st 5 lb)
- Position: Defence
- Shoots: Left
- Czech Extraliga team: HC Olomouc
- Played for: HC Prerov; HC Zlin; HC Dukla Jihlava; Orli Znojmo
- Playing career: 2010–present

Dalibor Řezníček (born August 25, 1991) is a Czech professional ice hockey player currently playing in the Czech Extraliga for the HC Olomouc.
