= Roman Vráblík =

Czech ice hockey player

- Born: January 15, 1990 (age 36) Písek, Czechoslovakia
- Height: 6 ft 2 in (188 cm)
- Weight: 187 lb (85 kg; 13 st 5 lb)
- Position: Defence
- Shoots: Left
- EHL team Former teams: Motor České Budějovice; Mountfield HK; HC Plzeň
- Playing career: 2011–present

Roman Vráblík (born January 15, 1990) is a Czech professional ice hockey defenceman. He is currently playing for Motor České Budějovice of the Czech Extraliga (ELH).

Vráblík made his Czech Extraliga debut playing with České Budějovice during the 2011–12 Czech Extraliga season.
