= 1980–81 IIHF European Cup =

European ice hockey tournament

The 1980–81 European Cup was the 16th edition of the European Cup, IIHF's premier European club ice hockey tournament. The season started on October 9, 1980, and finished on August 9, 1981.

The tournament was won by CSKA Moscow, who won the final group.

== First round ==
Team #1	Score	Team #2
Flyers Heerenveen (Netherlands)	12–1, 11–2	(Bulgaria) Levski-Spartak Sofia
Vojens IK (Denmark)	3–10, 2–11	(Poland) Zaglebie Sosnowiec
Dynamo Berlin (East Germany)	13–4, 10–2	(Romania) HC Steaua București
EC KAC (Austria)	2–3, 1–4	(Italy) HC Gherdëina
CHH Txuri Urdin (Spain)	2–2, 2–10	(France) ASG Tours

(Switzerland) EHC Arosa, (Socialist Federal Republic of Yugoslavia) HK Olimpija Ljubljana, (West Germany) Mannheimer ERC : bye

== Second round ==
Team #1	Score	Team #2
Flyers Heerenveen (Netherlands)	5–6, 5–3	(Switzerland) EHC Arosa
Zaglebie Sosnowiec (Poland)	6–3, 1–6	(East Germany) Dynamo Berlin
HC Gherdëina (Italy)	1–1, 3–8	(Socialist Federal Republic of Yugoslavia) HK Olimpija Ljubljana
ASG Tours (France)	5–6, 2–9	(West Germany) Mannheimer ERC

(Finland) HIFK, (Sweden) Brynäs IF, (Czechoslovakia) Poldi Kladno, (Soviet Union) CSKA Moscow : bye

== Third round ==
Team #1	Score	Team #2
HK Olimpija Ljubljana (Socialist Federal Republic of Yugoslavia)	2–5, 2–12	(Czechoslovakia) Poldi Kladno
Dynamo Berlin (East Germany)	2–3, 3–6	(Finland) HIFK
Mannheimer ERC (West Germany)	3–6, 4–5	(Sweden) Brynäs IF
Flyers Heerenveen (Netherlands)	0–11, 1–9	(Soviet Union) CSKA Moscow

== Final Group ==
(Urtijëi, Italy)

Team #1	Score	Team #2
HIFK (Finland)	5–4	(Czechoslovakia) Poldi Kladno
CSKA Moscow (Soviet Union)	10–1	(Sweden) Brynäs IF
CSKA Moscow (Soviet Union)	6–0	(Finland) HIFK
Poldi Kladno (Czechoslovakia)	4–2	(Sweden) Brynäs IF
HIFK (Finland)	3–3	(Sweden) Brynäs IF
CSKA Moscow (Soviet Union)	12–2	(Czechoslovakia) Poldi Kladno

=== Final group standings ===
Rank	Team	Points
1	(Soviet Union) CSKA Moscow	6
2	(Finland) HIFK	3
3	(Czechoslovakia) Poldi Kladno	2
4	(Sweden) Brynäs IF	1
