= Pavel Klhůfek =

Czech ice hockey forward

- Born: 27 October 1991 (age 34) Zlín, Czechoslovakia
- Height: 5 ft 11 in (180 cm)
- Weight: 176 lb (80 kg; 12 st 8 lb)
- Position: Forward
- Shoots: Left
- Chance Liga team Former teams: VHK Vsetín; HC Slavia Praha; HC Berounští Medvědi; BK Havlíčkův Brod; Orli Znojmo; HKM Zvolen; PSG Berani Zlín; Piráti Chomutov; HC Košice
- Playing career: 2010–present

Pavel Klhůfek (born 27 October 1991) is a Czech professional ice hockey player who currently playing for VHK Vsetín of the Chance Liga.

== Career ==
Klhůfek began his career with his hometown HC Zlín, playing in their junior teams before joining HC Slavia Praha in 2009. He made his Czech Extraliga debut for Slavia Praha during the 2010–11 season. Klhůfek would spend the next four seasons dividing his time between Slavia Praha and loan spells with HC Berounští Medvědi and BK Havlíčkův Brod until 30 January 2015, where he signed for Orli Znojmo of the Erste Bank Eishockey Liga.

On 5 June 2017, Klhůfek returned to Zlín, eight years after leaving their junior team.

== Career statistics ==
=== Regular season and playoffs ===
			Regular season					Playoffs
Season	Team	League	GP	G	A	Pts	PIM	GP	G	A	Pts	PIM
2015–16	HKM Zvolen	Slovak	55	19	25	44	38	12	2	0	2	8
2016–17	HKM Zvolen	Slovak	55	23	29	52	83	4	2	2	4	4
2017–18	PSG Berani Zlín	Czech	40	1	4	5	14	4	3	1	4	0
2018–19	Piráti Chomutov	Czech	45	9	7	16	14	—	—	—	—	—
2019–20	HC Košice	Slovak	53	11	12	23	12	—	—	—	—	—
2020–21	HC Košice	Slovak	47	31	17	48	58	4	0	0	0	8
2021–22	HC Košice	Slovak	48	19	13	32	26	13	4	4	8	6
Slovak totals			258	103	96	199	217	33	8	6	14	26
