= Antonín Melka =

Czech ice hockey player

- Born: 14 March 1990 (age 35); Kladno, Czechoslovakia
- Height: 5 ft 9 in (175 cm)
- Weight: 157 lb (71 kg; 11 st 3 lb)
- Position: Forward
- Shoots: Right
- ELH team: Rytíři Kladno
- Playing career: 2009–present

Antonín Melka (born 14 March 1990) is a Czech professional ice hockey forward who played with Rytíři Kladno in the Czech Extraliga (ELH) during the 2010–11 Czech Extraliga season.
