= HC Olomouc =

Ice hockey team

- Nickname: Mora, Kohouti (Roosters), Hanáci (Hanakians)
- City: Olomouc, Czech Republic
- League: Czech Extraliga
- Founded: 1955
- Home arena: Zimní stadion Olomouc (capacity: 5,500)
- Colours: Red, white
- Owner: (Czech Republic) Jan Tomajko
- General manager: (Czech Republic) Erik Fürst
- Head coach: (Czech Republic) Petr Fiala
- Website: hc-olomouc.cz

HC Olomouc is a professional ice hockey team in the Czech Extraliga, from the city of Olomouc. They won the Extraliga championship in the 1993/1994 season. In 1997, the club sold the Extraliga license to HC Karlovy Vary, and was thus relegated to the second-level league. They returned to the Extraliga in 2014.

== History ==
On 18 April 2014, they returned to the Extraliga by finishing 2nd in the relegation playoffs. 2014/2015 season started very well and by the end of year, team was on 5th place and even beaten elite team, HC Sparta Praha. But then a rapid fall came and the team fell from 5th place to 13th, thus it had to play play-outs and then relegation play-offs. They ended on 1st place, staying in league with Piráti Chomutov. HC Slavia Praha and ČEZ Motor České Budějovice were relegated.

== Honours ==
=== Domestic ===
Czech Extraliga

- (gold) Winners (1): 1993–94

Czech 1. Liga

- (silver) Runners-up (2): 2012–13, 2013–14
- (bronze) 3rd place (3): 2007–08, 2009–10, 2011–12

1st. Czech National Hockey League

- (gold) Winners (1): 1982–83
- (silver) Runners-up (8): 1981–82, 1983–84, 1984–85, 1985–86, 1986–87, 1987–88, 1988–89, 1989–90

== Players ==
=== Current roster ===
Source: hc-olomouc.czSource: eliteprospects.comAs of November 15, 2021.

No.	Nat	Player	Pos	S/G	Age	Acquired	Birthplace
42	(Slovakia)	Branislav Konrád	G	R	38	2015	Nitra, Czechoslovakia
6	(Czech Republic)	Tomáš Dujsík	D	R	33	2017	Brno, Czechoslovakia
41	(Czech Republic)	Petr Strapáč	LW	L	36	2016	Ostrava, Czechoslovakia
23	(Czech Republic)	Jiří Ondrušek (C)	D	L	40	2005	Olomouc, Czechoslovakia
88	(Czech Republic)	Jakub Navrátil	LW	L	27	2020	Hranice, Czech Republic
14	(Czech Republic)	Dalibor Řezníček	D	L	35	2021	Uherský Brod, Czechoslovakia
24	(Czech Republic)	Vilém Burian	RW	L	38	2016	Třebíč, Czechoslovakia
3	(Czech Republic)	David Škůrek	D	R	33	2012	Šternberk, Czech Republic
91	(Slovakia)	Silvester Kusko	LW	L	31	2021	Vranov nad Topľou, Slovakia
27	(Czech Republic)	Alex Rašner	D	L	30	2020	Jeseník, Czech Republic
18	(Czech Republic)	Vojtěch Tomeček	RW	R	32	2018	Karlovy Vary, Czech Republic
12	(Czech Republic)	Jan Knotek (A)	C	L	38	2013	Prague, Czechoslovakia
57	(Czech Republic)	Rostislav Olesz	LW	L	40	2019	Bílovec, Czechoslovakia
46	(Czech Republic)	David Krejčí (A)	C	R	40	2021	Šternberk, Czechoslovakia
51	(Czech Republic)	Jan Švrček	D	L	40	2018	Přerov, Czechoslovakia
71	(Czech Republic)	Lukáš Kucsera	RW	R	35	2020	Opava, Czechoslovakia
61	(Czech Republic)	Lukáš Klimek	C	L	39	2019	Ostrava, Czechoslovakia
22	(Czech Republic)	Michal Kunc	LW	L	25	2020	Brno, Czech Republic
48	(Czech Republic)	Tomáš Černý	D	R	29	2020	Vítkov, Czech Republic
19	(Czech Republic)	Lukáš Nahodil	C	R	38	2018	Třebíč, Czechoslovakia
–	(Czech Republic)	Jakub Orsava	RW	R	35	2022	Šumperk, Czechoslovakia
–	(Poland)	Aron Chmielewski	RW	R	34	2023	Gdańsk, Poland
–	(Czech Republic)	Jakub Sedláček	G	L	36	2023	Zlín, Czechoslovakia

== Famous players ==
- Pavel Brendl
- Jiří Hudler
- Michal Broš
- Jiří Dopita
- Ondřej Kratěna
- David Krejčí
- Jan Tomajko
