= Ondřej Kacetl =

Czech ice hockey player

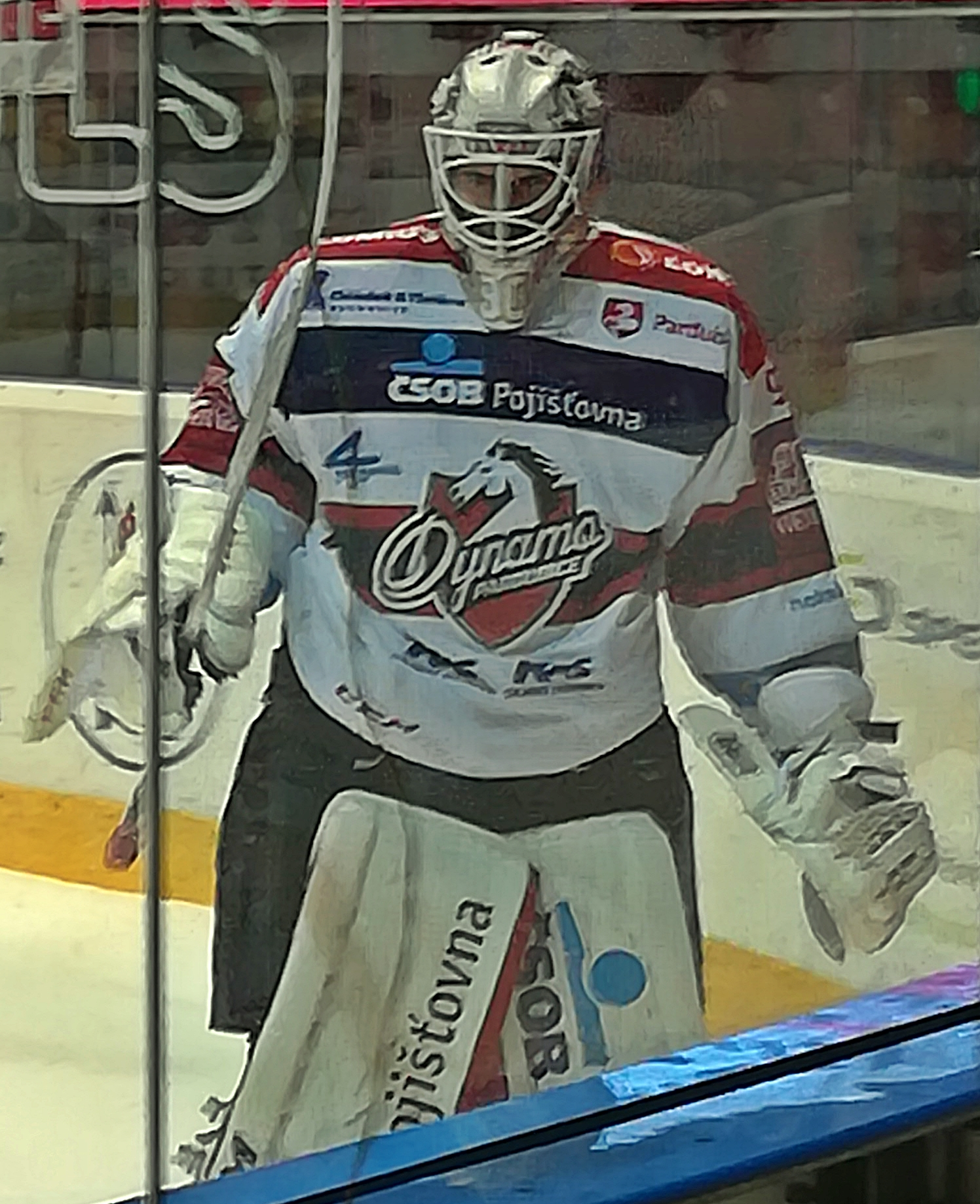
- Ondřej Kacetl 2017 picture
- Born: 15 October 1990 (age 35) Znojmo, Czechoslovakia
- Height: 6 ft 0 in (183 cm)
- Weight: 159 lb (72 kg; 11 st 5 lb)
- Position: Goalie
- Catches: Left
- Czech Extraliga team Former teams: HC Oceláři Třinec; Orli Znojmo; Mountfield HK; HC Havlíčkův Brod; HC Dukla Jihlava; HC Dynamo Pardubice; HC Stadion Litoměřice; HC Zubr Přerov; HC Frýdek-Místek
- Playing career: 2011–present

Ondřej Kacetl (born 15 October 1990) is a Czech professional ice hockey goalie. He is currently playing for HC Oceláři Třinec of the Czech Extraliga.

Kacetl made his Czech Extraliga debut playing with Mountfield HK during the 2013-14 Czech Extraliga season.

== Awards and honors ==
Award	Year
Czech
Champion	2021, 2022
