= Jiří Ondrušek =

Czech ice hockey player

- Born: April 2, 1986 (age 39) Czechoslovakia
- Height: 6 ft 2 in (188 cm)
- Weight: 190 lb (86 kg; 13 st 8 lb)
- Position: Defence
- Shoots: Left
- Czech2 team Former teams: HC Olomouc; HC Vitkovice
- NHL draft: Undrafted
- Playing career: 2006–present

Jiří Ondrušek (born April 2, 1986) is a Czech professional ice hockey defenceman. He currently plays with HC Olomouc in the First National Hockey League.

Ondrušek made his Czech Extraliga debut playing with HC Vitkovice debut during the 2011–12 Czech Extraliga season. On January 16, 2026, he played his 1100th game in the HC Olomouc jersey and became a true hockey legend of his local club.
