= Jakub Strnad =

Czech ice hockey player

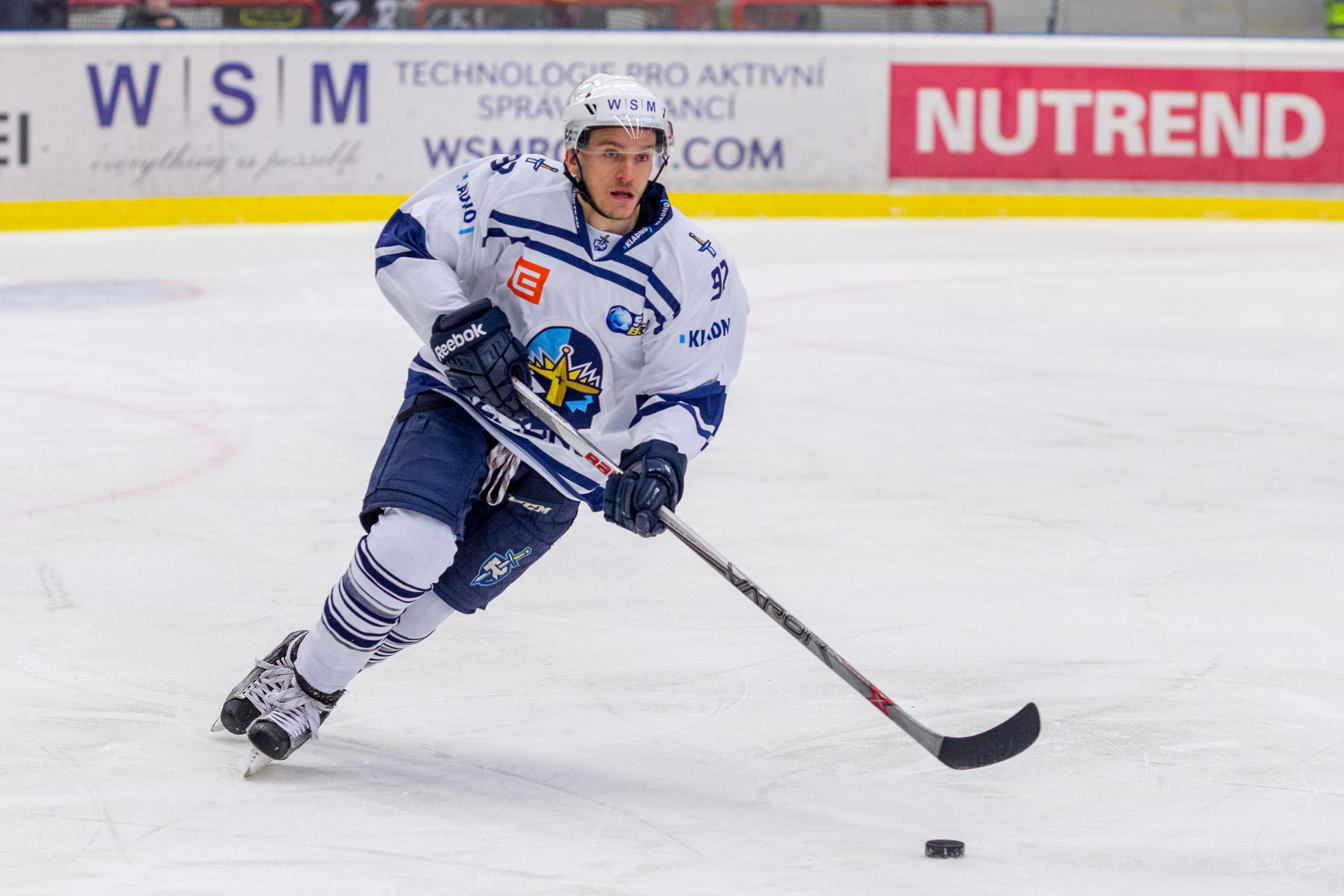
- Born: February 16, 1992 (age 33); Kladno, Czechoslovakia
- Height: 5 ft 11 in (180 cm)
- Weight: 172 lb (78 kg; 12 st 4 lb)
- Position: Forward
- Shoots: Left
- ELH team Former teams: Rytíři Kladno; HC Litvínov; BK Mladá Boleslav; HC Sparta Praha; Motor České Budějovice
- NHL draft: Undrafted
- Playing career: 2011–present

Jakub Strnad (born February 16, 1992) is a Czech professional ice hockey player. He is currently playing with Rytíři Kladno in the Czech Extraliga (ELH).

He made his professional debut with Kladno during the 2010–11 Czech Extraliga playoffs.
