= Rytíři Kladno =

Ice hockey team

- City: Kladno, Czech Republic
- League: Czech Extraliga
- Founded: 1924
- Home arena: ČEZ Stadion (capacity: 5,200)
- Colours: dark blue, white
- Owners: Tomas Drastil, Jaromír Jágr
- CEO: Renata Pánková
- General manager: Tomáš Plekanec
- Head coach: Radim Rulík
- Captain: Miroslav Forman, Jérémie Blain
- Website: rytirikladno.cz

Franchise history
- 1924–1948: HOSK Kladno
- 1948–1949: TJ Sokol Kladno
- 1949–1953: TJ Sokol SONP Kladno
- 1953–1958: DSO Baník Kladno SONP
- 1968–1977: TJ SONP Kladno
- 1977–1989: TJ Poldi SONP Kladno
- 1989–1997: HC Poldi Kladno / HC Kladno
- 1997–2000: HC Velvana Kladno
- 2000–2003: HC Vagnerplast Kladno
- 2003–2006: HC Rabat Kladno
- 2006–2010: HC GEUS OKNA Kladno
- 2010–2011: HC Vagnerplast Kladno
- Since 2011: Rytíři Kladno

Rytíři Kladno (English: Kladno Knights) is a Czech professional ice hockey team based in the city of Kladno. They are currently a member of the Czech Extraliga. The team president and owner is Jaromír Jágr, a former NHL player, who is currently playing in home games for the team in addition to his ownership and administrative roles. The team plays its home games at ČEZ Stadion.

== History ==
Kladno was a particularly strong team in the late 1970s, when it won four consecutive league titles (1975–1978), and again in 1980. The team's star, Milan Nový, was league MVP in 1977, 1981, and 1982, and won six scoring titles. František Pospíšil was the league MVP in 1971 and 1972. The team was sponsored by the State Security police until the Velvet Revolution of 1989.

Before the 1997–98 season Kladno lost its sponsor, ironworks Huť Poldi. Eventually the Poldi crest disappeared from Kladno jerseys and the successes that this once famous club achieved in previous years also disappeared, perennially finishing last in the league. Primarily the lack of funds did not allow to management improvement of club cadre and the main coach resigned.

Despite the departure of a number of players abroad in 2003, Kladno continued to perform well and celebrated return to the Czech highest-level league. However, after the season 2012-13 Kladno performed poorly in the Extraliga. Nor the withdrawal of coaches helped, the team reached the highest league again after the 12 years.

Jaromír Jágr played for his hometown Kladno for parts of four seasons, including during the NHL lockouts in 1994, 2004, and 2012. In January 2018, Jágr was assigned to HC Kladno after a partial season with the Calgary Flames. Jágr took over majority ownership from his father in 2011.

During the 2010–2011 season, the team was docked 6 points for having used players who were not correctly registered to the club, an affair which also involved the clubs BK Mladá Boleslav and HC Plzeň.

Jaromír Jágr stated on January 30, 2025, that he's selling an 80 per cent stake of the hockey club to businessman Tomas Drastil while holding on to the remaining minority stake. Financial details were not given

=== Summary of league participation ===
- 1951–1953: First Ice Hockey League (highest-level league in Czechoslovakia)
- 1953–1955: Celostátní soutěž (second-level league in Czechoslovakia)
- 1955–1983: First Ice Hockey League (highest-level league in Czechoslovakia)
- 1983–1985: 1. ČNHL (second-level league in Czechoslovakia)
- 1985–1986: First Ice Hockey League (highest-level league in Czechoslovakia)
- 1986–1987: 1. ČNHL (second-level league in Czechoslovakia)
- 1987–1993: First Ice Hockey League (highest-level league in Czechoslovakia)
- 1993–2002: Czech Extraliga (highest-level league in the Czech Republic)
- 2002–2003: 1st Czech Republic Hockey League (second-level league in the Czech Republic)
- 2003–2014: Czech Extraliga (highest-level league in the Czech Republic)
- 2014–2019 : WSM Liga (second-level league in the Czech Republic)
- 2019–20 : Czech Extraliga (highest-level league in the Czech Republic)
- 2020–21 : 1st Czech Republic Hockey League
- 2021–present : Czech Extraliga (highest-level league in the Czech Republic)

== Club names ==
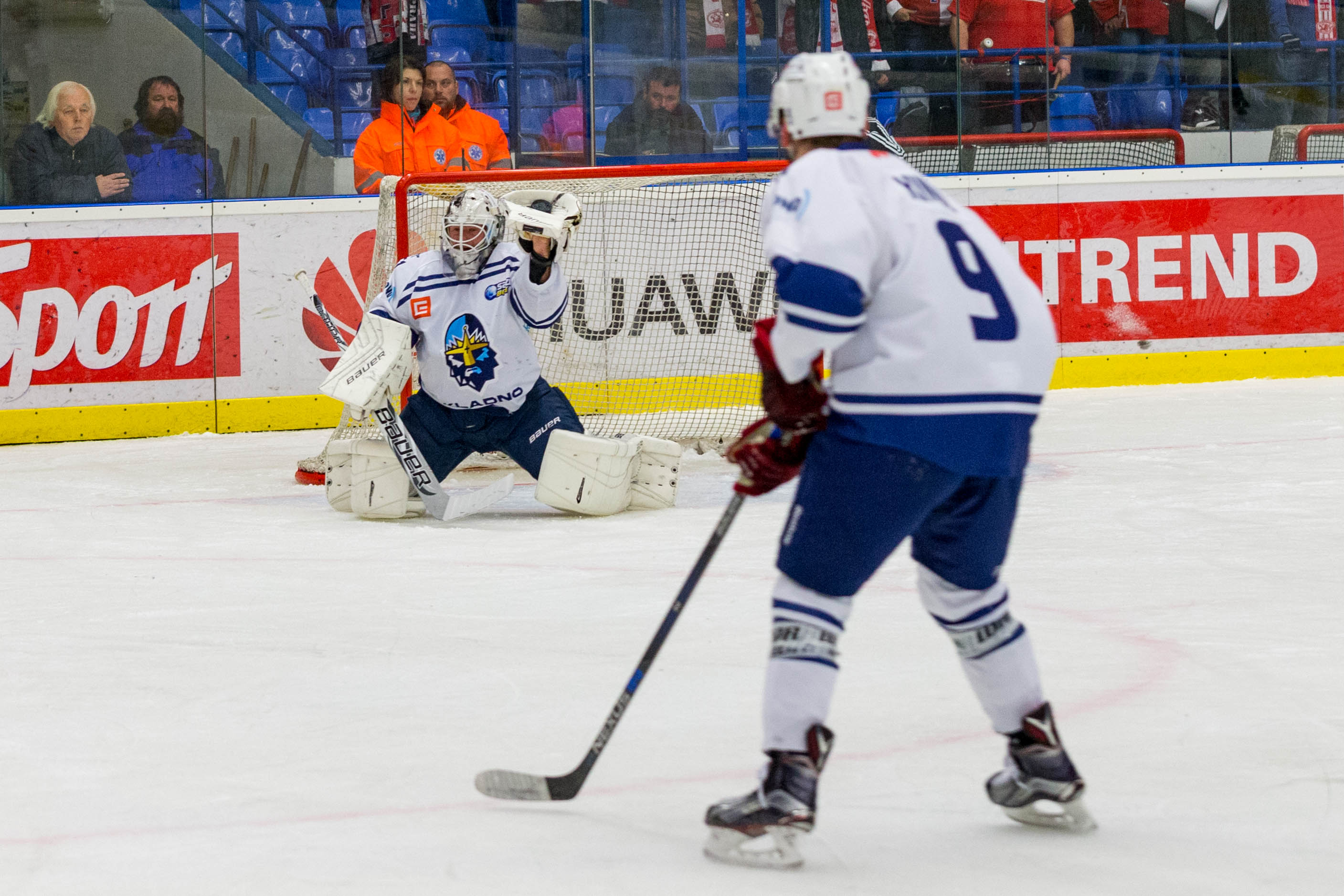
Rytíři Kladno players (2017)

The club began in 1924 as the ice hockey department of SK Kladno, abbreviated HOSK Kladno. When the Communist Party of Czechoslovakia seized the Czechoslovak government in 1948, private sports clubs were reorganized as tělovýchovných jednot (TJ, lit. 'physical education unities') and obligated to join the Sokol movement; HOSK Kladno was therefore renamed TJ Sokol Kladno. The following year, the club became associated with the United Steelworks (Spojené ocelárny, národní podnik, SONP), a national enterprise which operated the former Poldi steelworks in Kladno, and its name was expanded to TJ Sokol SONP Kladno.

When the Czechoslovak State Committee for Physical Education and Sport (SVTVS) was established in 1953, all sports clubs were designated as voluntary sports organizations (dobrovolné sportovním organizacím, DSO) and nine DSOs were created in affiliation with trade unions. TJ Sokol SONP Kladno was renamed DSO Baník Kladno SONP, as 'Baník' was the name of the DSO affiliated with the union of miners and steelworkers. The club name was shortened to TJ SONP Kladno in 1958 and that name was used for almost twenty years, until it was expanded to TJ Poldi SONP Kladno in 1977.

Following the Velvet Revolution in 1989, the club returned to private ownership and was called HC Poldi Kladno. The club retained the 'HC Kladno' element of its name for the following two decades, though the full club name changed multiple times for sponsorship reasons. Sponsors included Poldi, which had been re-privatized; Velvana, an automotive chemical manufacturer; Vagnerplast, an acrylic bathtub manufacturer; Rabat, a construction materials supplier; and GEUS Okna, a window manufacturer.

The club has been named Rytíři Kladno since 2011.

=== Timeline ===
- 1924 – HOSK Kladno (Hokejový odbor sportovního klubu Kladno, 'Hockey department of sports club Kladno')
- 1948 – TJ Sokol Kladno (Tělovýchovná jednota Sokol Kladno, 'Physical education coalition Sokol Kladno')
- 1949 – TJ Sokol SONP Kladno (Tělovýchovná jednota Sokol Spojené ocelárny, národní podnik Kladno, 'Physical education coalition Sokol United Steelworks, national enterprise Kladno')
- 1953 – DSO Baník Kladno SONP (Dobrovolná sportovní organizace Baník Kladno Spojené ocelárny, národní podnik, 'Voluntary sports organization Baník Kladno United Steelworks, national enterprise')
- 1958 – TJ SONP Kladno (Tělovýchovná jednota Spojené ocelárny, národní podnik Kladno, 'Physical education coalition United Steelworks, national enterprise Kladno')
- 1977 – TJ Poldi SONP Kladno (Tělovýchovná jednota Poldi Spojené ocelárny, národní podnik Kladno, 'Physical education coalition Poldi United Steelworks, national enterprise Kladno')
- 1989 – HC Poldi Kladno (Hockey Club Poldi Kladno)
- 1991 – HC Kladno (Hockey Club Kladno)
- 1994 – HC Poldi Kladno
- 1996 – HC Kladno
- 1997 – HC Velvana Kladno (Hockey Club Velvana Kladno)
- 2000 – HC Vagnerplast Kladno (Hockey Club Vagnerplast Kladno)
- 2003 – HC Rabat Kladno (Hockey Club Rabat Kladno)
- 2006 – HC GEUS OKNA Kladno (Hockey Club GEUS OKNA Kladno)
- 2010 – HC Vagnerplast Kladno
- 2011 – Rytíři Kladno (a name chosen by new owner Járomir Jágr, along with a logo prominently featuring a cross in homage to the Eastern Orthodoxy)

== Players ==
=== Current roster ===
As of 4 Marc 2026

No.	Nat	Player	Pos	S/G	Age	Acquired	Birthplace
1	(Czech Republic)	Adam Brízgala	G	L	28	2018	Prague, Czech Republic
35	(Sweden)	Oscar Dansk	G	L	32	2025	Stockholm, Sweden
2	(Czech Republic)	Daniel Jansa	G	L	21	2025	Tábor, Czech Republic
55	(Canada)	Jérémie Blain	D	L	34	2025	Le Moyne, Quebec, Canada
8	(Czech Republic)	Michal Houdek	D	L	26	2025	Plzeň, Czech Republic
63	(Czech Republic)	Martin Jandus	D	R	28	2025	Prague, Czech Republic
5	(Czech Republic)	Martin Matějíček	D	R	21	2025	Jihlava, Czech Republic
77	(Canada)	Griffin Mendel	D	L	27	2024	Kelowna, British Columbia, Canada
37	(Italy)	Phil Pietroniro	D	R	32	2024	Montreal, Quebec, Canada
75	(Czech Republic)	Jan Piskáček	D	R	37	2025	Kladno, Czech Republic
13	(Czech Republic)	Tomáš Tomek	D	R	23	2025	Prague, Czech Republic
4	(Czech Republic)	Tomáš Vandas	D	R	21	2024	Jihlava, Czech Republic
94	(United States)	Wyatte Wylie	D	R	26	2025	Everett, Washington, United States
51	(Czech Republic)	Dušan Žovinec	D	L	33	2025	Prague, Czech Republic
28	(Canada)	Daniel Audette	C	L	30	2025	Blainville, Quebec, Canada
10	(Czech Republic)	Adam Bareš	F	L	22	2025	Slaný, Czech Republic
91	(Czech Republic)	Marcel Barinka	F	R	25	2025	Prague, Czech Republic
89	(Czech Republic)	Ondřej Bláha	LW	L	26	2018	Prague, Czech Republic
88	(Czech Republic)	Miroslav Forman	C	L	36	2025	Mělník, Czech Republic
11	(Czech Republic)	Kryštof Hrabík	C	L	26	2026	Prague, Czech Republic
68	(Czech Republic)	Jaromír Jágr	RW	L	54	2017	Kladno, Czechoslovakia
67	(United States)	Kelly Klíma	LW	L	29	2025	Tampa, Florida, United States
9	(Czech Republic)	Jakub Konečný	C	R	24	2025	Brno, Czech Republic
24	(Czech Republic)	Oskar Lisler	C	R	20	2025	Mladá Boleslav, Czech Republic
	(Czech Republic)	Marcel Marcel	LW	L	22	2026	Plzeň, Czech Republic
43	(Czech Republic)	Antonín Melka	LW	L	36	2018	Kladno, Czechoslovakia
20	(Finland)	Niko Ojamäki	RW	L	31	2025	Pori, Finland
	(Czech Republic)	Vojtěch Polák	C	R	22	2026	Nymburk, Czech Republic
23	(Czech Republic)	Martin Procházka	RW	R	32	2022	Roudnice, Czech Republic
27	(Czech Republic)	Sebastián Redlich	F	L	22	2024	Prague, Czech Republic
93	(Canada)	Tristen Robins	C	L	24	2025	London, United Kingdom
19	(Czech Republic)	Martin Ryšavý	F	L	23	2025	Přerov, Czech Republic
92	(Czech Republic)	Jakub Strnad	LW	L	34	2023	Kladno, Czechoslovakia
21	(Canada)	Samuel Vigneault	C	L	31	2025	Baie-Comeau, Quebec, Canada
15	(Belarus)	Aliaksandr Vishneuski	F	L	20	2025	Belarus

=== NHL alumni ===
- (Czech Republic) Patrik Eliáš
- (Czech Republic) Michael Frolík
- (Czech Republic) Milan Hnilička
- (Czech Republic) Ivan Huml
- (Czech Republic) Jaromír Jágr
- (Czech Republic) František Kaberle
- (Czech Republic) Tomáš Kaberle
- (Czech Republic) Milan Nový
- (Czech Republic) Pavel Patera
- (Czech Republic) Michal Pivoňka
- (Czech Republic) Tomáš Plekanec
- (Czech Republic) Martin Procházka
- (Czech Republic) Pavel Skrbek
- (Czech Republic) Radek Smoleňák
- (Czech Republic) Petr Tenkrát
- (Czech Republic) Jiří Tlustý
- (Czech Republic) Tomáš Vokoun
- (Czech Republic) Marek Židlický
- (Czech Republic) Radko Gudas
- (Czech Republic) Ondřej Pavelec
- (Czech Republic) Jakub Voráček
- (Czech Republic) Jiří Sekáč

== Honours ==
=== Domestic ===
Czech Extraliga

- (bronze) 3rd place (1): 1993–94

Czech 1. Liga

- (gold) Winners (2): 2002–03, 2020–21
- (silver) Runners-up (2): 2017–18, 2018–19
- (bronze) 3rd place (1): 2016–17

Czechoslovak Extraliga

- (gold) Winners (6): 1958–59, 1974–75, 1975–76, 1976–77, 1977–78, 1979–80
- (silver) Runners-up (1): 1981–82
- (bronze) 3rd place (2): 1971–72, 1980–81

1st. Czech National Hockey League

- (gold) Winners (3): 1983–84, 1984–85, 1986–87

2nd. Czechoslovak Hockey League

- (gold) Winners (1): 1954–55
- (bronze) 3rd place (1): 1953–54

=== International ===
IIHF European Cup

- (gold) Winners (1): 1976–77
- (silver) Runners-up (3): 1975–76, 1977–78, 1978–79
- (bronze) 3rd place (1): 1980–81
