= Martin Procházka (ice hockey, born 1994) =

Czech ice hockey player

- Born: March 1, 1994 (age 31) Roudnice, Czech Republic
- Height: 6 ft 3 in (191 cm)
- Weight: 223 lb (101 kg; 15 st 13 lb)
- Position: Forward
- Shoots: Right
- ELH team Former teams: Rytíři Kladno; HC Sparta Praha; HC Bílí Tygři Liberec; HC Plzeň; BK Mladá Boleslav; HC Dynamo Pardubice
- Playing career: 2012–present

Martin Procházka (born March 1, 1994) is a Czech professional ice hockey forward playing for Rytíři Kladno of the Czech Extraliga (ELH).

Procházka made his Czech Extraliga debut playing with HC Sparta Praha during the 2013–14 Czech Extraliga season.
