= Werk Arena =

Czech indoor hockey arena

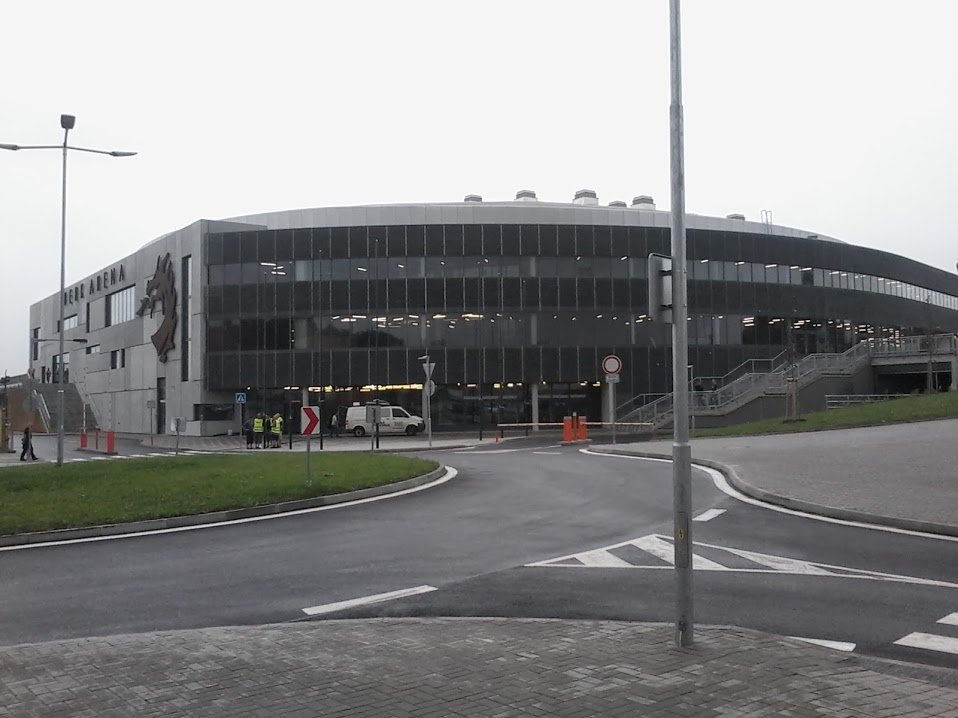
- Interactive map of Werk Arena
- Location: Frýdecká 850, Třinec, Czech Republic 739 61
- Coordinates: 49.6699083333°N 18.6637722222°E
- Operator: HC Oceláři Třinec
- Capacity: 5,400
- Field size: 58.88 m × 27.26 m (193.2 ft × 89.4 ft)

Construction
- Groundbreaking: 2012
- Built: 2014

Tenant
- HC Oceláři Třinec (Czech Extraliga) (2014–present)

Werk Arena is an indoor sporting arena located in Třinec, Czech Republic. The capacity of the arena is 5,400 people.

== History ==
The arena was built in 2014. It is currently home to the HC Oceláři Třinec ice hockey team. Also, it hosted the Czech Republic men's tennis team at the 2016 Davis Cup World Group. The name refers to the Třinec Iron and Steel Works (called Werk in the regional dialect), the main sponsor of the hockey club.

Werk Arena co-hosted the 2020 World Junior Ice Hockey Championships along with Ostrava's Ostravar Aréna.
