= Mountfield HK =

- Nickname: Lvi (The Lions)
- City: Hradec Králové, Czech Republic
- League: (Czech Republic) Czech Extraliga
- Founded: 1925
- Home arena: ČPP Arena capacity: 6 890 (3920 for sitting, 2970 for standing)
- Colours: red, white, black, yellow
- Owner: (Czech Republic) Aleš Kmoníček
- General manager: (Czech Republic) Aleš Kmoníček
- Head coach: (Czech Republic) Tomáš Martinec
- Captain: (Czech Republic) Tomáš Pavelka
- Website: mountfieldhk.cz

Mountfield HK (full name: Mountfield Hradec Králové, a.s.) is a Czech ice hockey club based in Hradec Králové, active in the Czech Extraliga since the 2013–14 season. The club colors are white, red, black and yellow. Partner clubs are SC Retia Kolín and HC Příbram.

It plays its home matches in the winter stadium Hradec Králové (ČPP arena) under the White Tower with a capacity of 6,890 spectators.

== History ==
Mountfield HK aligns itself with the history of Královští Lvi, a club formed in Hradec Králové in 1926 that operated a men's team until 2013. In the meantime, Mountfield a.s., a Czech-based home and garden retailer, owned and operated a hockey club in České Budějovice from 2006 to 2013.

Following the 2012–13 season, the Czech Extraliga reached a sponsorship deal with Radegast to sell its beer in all Extraliga arenas. This agreement conflicted with the naming rights deal České Budějovice already had with Budweiser Budvar Brewery for their arena. Under the agreement, the club and the city would face stiff penalties for selling any beer other than Budvar products. Unable to resolve the dispute, the club decided on 18 June 2013 that no agreement could be reached between the parties involved and voted to immediately relocate to Hradec Králové for the 2013–14 season.

At that point, Královští Lvi became Mountfield HK's youth program, while Motor České Budějovice inherited Hradec Králové's spot in the Czech 1.liga.

== Honours ==
=== Domestic ===
Czech Extraliga

- (silver) Runners-up (1): 2022–23
- (bronze) 3rd place (1): 2016–17

Czech 1. Liga

- (bronze) 3rd place (1): 2006–07

1st. Czech National Hockey League

- (gold) Winners (1): 1992–93
- (silver) Runners-up (1): 1982–83

2nd. Czechoslovak Hockey League

- (gold) Winners (2): 1966–67, 1967–68

=== International ===
Champions Hockey League

- (silver) Runners-up (1): 2019–20

== Players ==
=== Current roster ===
As of 21 August 2024

No.	Nat	Player	Pos	S/G	Age	Acquired	Birthplace
95	(Latvia)	Oskars Batņa	C	L	31	2024	Riga, Latvia
55	(Canada)	Jérémie Blain	D	R	27	2020	Longueuil, Quebec, Canada
65	(Slovakia)	Martin Bučko	D	R	26	2024	Martin, Slovakia
71	(Czech Republic)	Matěj Chalupa	LW	L	28	2023	Prague, Czech Republic
15	(United States)	Ryan Dmowski	LW	L	29	2024	East Lyme, Connecticut, United States
88	(Canada)	Giorgio Estephan	C	R	29	2023	Edmonton, Alberta, Canada
17	(Latvia)	Ralfs Freibergs	D	L	35	2023	Riga, Latvia
10	(Czech Republic)	Michael Gaspar	D	L	26	2019	Prague, Czech Republic
26	(Czech Republic)	Aleš Jergl	RW	R	32	2019	Kroměříž, Czech Republic
29	(Czech Republic)	Petr Kalina	D	L	29	2021	Roudnice, Czech Republic
2	(Czech Republic)	Jan Kasal	G	L	21	2024	Hinsdale, Illinois, United States
34	(Czech Republic)	Kevin Klíma	LW	L	29	2019	Tampa, Florida, United States
20	(Czech Republic)	Kryštof Lang	RW	R	24	2021	Tábor, Czech Republic
12	(Canada)	Graeme McCormack	D	R	35	2021	Thunder Bay, Ontario, Canada
56	(Czech Republic)	Patrik Miškář	C	L	30	2023	Hořice, Czech Republic
83	(Czech Republic)	Petr Moravec	C	L	23	2022	Hradec Králové, Czech Republic
89	(Slovakia)	Dávid Mudrák	D	R	25	2024	Zvolen, Slovakia
85	(Czech Republic)	Adam Novotný	LW	L	18	2023	Hradec Králové, Czech Republic
35	(Czech Republic)	Filip Novotný	G	L	35	2024	Pelhřimov, Czech Republic
19	(Czech Republic)	Tomáš Pavelka	D	L	33	2023	Ostrava, Czech Republic
98	(Czech Republic)	Radovan Pavlík	LW	L	28	2022	Hradec Králové, Czech Republic
94	(France)	Jordann Perret	RW	L	31	2019	Autrans, France
7	(Czech Republic)	Matěj Pinkas	D	L	22	2021	Prague, Czech Republic
9	(Czech Republic)	Martin Pláněk	D	R	35	2023	Znojmo, Czech Republic
18	(Czech Republic)	Štěpán Pokorný	C	L	26	2024	Kolín, Czech Republic
64	(Czech Republic)	Jakub Pour	RW	L	27	2024	Rokycany, Czech Republic
31	(Slovakia)	Stanislav Škorvánek	G	L	30	2024	Žilina, Slovakia
92	(Czech Republic)	David Šťastný	LW	L	33	2023	Přerov, Czech Republic
16	(Czech Republic)	Martin Štohanzl	C	L	26	2021	Opočno, Czech Republic
25	(Slovakia)	Alex Tamáši	C	L	28	2023	Rimavská Sobota, Slovakia
33	(Czech Republic)	Jakub Tichý	G	L	23	2024	Kolín, Czech Republic
24	(Czech Republic)	Štěpán Černý	D	L	19	2024	Hradec Králové, Czech Republic

== Champions Hockey League, CHL ==
Mountfield Hradec Králové (professional ice hockey team) lost the Final of the Champions Hockey League, CHL year 2020 against Frölunda, Sweden.
