= 2021–22 Czech Extraliga season =

- League: Czech Extraliga
- Sport: Ice hockey
- Duration: 8 September 2021 – 28 April 2022
- Number of teams: 15

Regular season
- Presidential Cup: Mountfield HK

Playoffs

Finals
- Champions: Třinec
- Runners-up: Sparta Praha

Czech Extraliga seasons
- ← 2020–21 2022–23 →

The 2021–22 Czech Extraliga season was the 29th season of the Czech Extraliga since its creation after the breakup of Czechoslovakia and the Czechoslovak First Ice Hockey League in 1993. Defending champions Třinec won the championship for the third time in a row and became the first club to do so in the 21st century. They beat Sparta Praha by four games to two in the finals.

== Regular season ==
=== Standings ===
Each team played 56 games, playing each of the other fourteen teams four times – 2x at home, 2x away. Points were awarded for each game, where three points were awarded for winning in regulation time, two points for winning in overtime or shootout, one point for losing in overtime or shootout, and zero points for losing in regulation time. At the end of the regular season, the team that finished with the most points was crowned the league champion.

Pos	Team	Pld	W	OTW	OTL	L	GF	GA	GD	Pts	Qualification
1	Mountfield HK	56	31	9	5	11	182	115	+67	116	Qualification to Quarter-finals
2	Třinec	56	31	6	7	12	174	118	+56	112	Qualification to Quarter-finals
3	Sparta Praha	56	27	6	6	17	203	153	+50	99	Qualification to Quarter-finals
4	České Budějovice	56	26	5	5	20	166	151	+15	93	Qualification to Quarter-finals
5	Pardubice	56	22	11	5	18	173	152	+21	93	Qualification to Wild card round
6	Plzeň	56	24	5	9	18	167	154	+13	91	Qualification to Wild card round
7	Liberec	56	25	3	8	20	146	147	−1	89	Qualification to Wild card round
8	Vítkovice	56	22	8	5	21	142	149	−7	87	Qualification to Wild card round
9	Olomouc	56	20	8	4	24	133	152	−19	80	Qualification to Wild card round
10	Kometa Brno	56	17	10	5	24	145	163	−18	76	Qualification to Wild card round
11	Mladá Boleslav	56	21	3	7	25	128	148	−20	76	Qualification to Wild card round
12	Karlovy Vary	56	19	4	7	26	160	176	−16	72	Qualification to Wild card round
13	Litvínov	56	18	4	8	26	152	173	−21	70	
14	Kladno	56	14	6	8	28	142	183	−41	62	Qualification to Play Out
15	Zlín	56	9	6	5	36	108	187	−79	44	Relegated to Czech 1. Liga

Source: Tipsport Extraliga
Rules for classification: 1) Points; 2) Head-to-head points.

=== Statistics ===
==== Scoring leaders ====
The following shows the top ten players who led the league in points, at the conclusion of the regular season.

Player	Team	GP	G	A	Pts	+/–	PIM
(Czech Republic) Filip Chlapík	HC Sparta Praha	53	31	39	70	+28	39
(Czech Republic) Lukáš Pech	HC Motor České Budějovice	56	22	35	57	+8	32
(Czech Republic) Michal Bulíř	HC Škoda Plzeň	53	27	29	56	−2	18
(United States) Peter Mueller	HC Kometa Brno	48	23	32	55	+5	14
(Czech Republic) Tomáš Plekanec	Rytíři Kladno	56	17	36	53	−4	46
(Sweden) Erik Thorell	HC Sparta Praha	49	21	31	52	+17	8
(Finland) Ahti Oksanen	Mountfield HK	56	25	23	48	+27	16
(Czech Republic) Martin Růžička	HC Oceláři Třinec	52	21	27	48	+5	12
(Canada) Giorgio Estephan	HC VERVA Litvínov	56	18	30	48	−8	10
(Czech Republic) Robert Říčka	HC Dynamo Pardubice	48	27	20	47	−1	30

==== Leading goaltenders ====
The following shows the top ten goaltenders who led the league in goals against average, provided that they have played at least 40% of their team's minutes, at the conclusion of the regular season.

Player	Team	GP	TOI	W	L	GA	SO	Sv%	GAA
(Czech Republic) Ondřej Kacetl	HC Oceláři Třinec	25	1394:00	17	6	38	2	93.00	1.64
(Finland) Henri Kiviaho	Mountfield HK	27	1566:00	16	10	53	2	92.26	2.03
(Czech Republic) Marek Mazanec	HC Oceláři Třinec	34	1971:00	20	12	72	5	91.04	2.19
(Czech Republic) Dominik Pavlát	HC Škoda Plzeň	25	1385:00	11	13	51	2	91.79	2.21
(Czech Republic) Dominik Frodl	HC Dynamo Pardubice	38	2123:00	19	17	82	4	91.41	2.32
(Czech Republic) Petr Kváča	Bílí Tygři Liberec	44	2591:00	22	22	104	3	91.66	2.41
(Czech Republic) Jakub Sedláček	HC Kometa Brno	20	1154:00	11	9	47	3	91.83	2.44
(Slovenia) Gašper Krošelj	BK Mladá Boleslav	32	1714:00	14	15	70	2	90.85	2.45
(Czech Republic) Jan Růžička	BK Mladá Boleslav	31	1614:00	10	16	68	1	90.41	2.53
(Czech Republic) Štěpán Lukeš	HC Energie Karlovy Vary	35	2033:00	20	13	86	4	91.09	2.54

== Relegation series ==
Relegation series played between Rytíři Kladno, the 14th team in regular season, and HC Dukla Jihlava, the winner of 1. Liga winners. The winner of the best-of-seven series would play in the 2022–23 Czech Extraliga.

17 April 2022; 16:00 (CEST)	Kladno	6–4 (1–0, 2–3, 3–1) score in the series: 1–0	Jihlava	Rocknet aréna, Chomutov; Attendance: 4,500

Game reference

Landon Bow
Goalies
Maksim Zhukov
Referees:
Adam Kika
Matěj Sýkora
Linesmen:
Jiří Gebauer
Marek Hlavatý

Kubík (Plekanec, Hlava) (PP1) – 05:05	1–0
	1–1	26:09 – Havránek (Kachyňa, Dundáček)
Hlava (Kubík) – 29:41	2–1
	2–2	30:02 – Helt (Kachyňa)
	2–3	32:50 – Skořepa (Havránek)
Filip (Babka) (SH1) – 39:24	3–3
Baránek (Indrák) – 45:17	4–3
	4–4	50:58 – Havránek (Bilčík, Dundáček)
Kubík (Dotchin, Jágr) (PP1) – 54:29	5–4
Hlava (Plekanec, Dotchin) – 57:13	6–4

37 min
Penalties
26 min
6
Shots
6

18 April 2022; 18:00 (CEST)	Kladno	4–1 (0–1, 2–0, 2–0) score in the series: 2–0	Jihlava	Rocknet aréna, Chomutov; Attendance: 4,200

Game reference

Landon Bow
Goalies
Maksim Zhukov
Referees:
René Hradil
Tomáš Veselý
Linesmen:
Ladislav Lučan
Milan Kis

	0–1	03:19 – Čermák
Babka – 24:26	1–1
Kubík (Baránek) (PP1) – 25:32	2–1
Zikmund (Wood) – 46:03	3–1
Dotchin – 58:59	4–1

6 min
Penalties
6 min
29
Shots
38

21 April 2022; 17:30 (CEST)	Jihlava	5–3 (1–0, 3–3, 1–0) score in the series: 1–2	Kladno	CZ LOKO ARÉNA, Jihlava; Attendance: 5,134

Game reference

Maksim Zhukov
Goalies
Landon Bow
Referees:
Robin Šír
Matěj Sýkora
Linesmen:
Miroslav Lhotský
Jiří Svoboda

Eliáš (Cachnín, Menšík) – 16:21	1–0
	1–1	22:29 – Beran (Melka, Zikmund)
	1–2	23:18 – Babka (Jágr)
Zadražil (Havránek) – 25:10	2–2
Seman (Harkabus, Mareš) (PP1) – 28:31	3–2
Havránek (Helt, Zadražil) (PP1) – 33:56	4–2
	4–3	39:01 – Plekanec (Kubík)
Čachotský (Havránek) (EN) – 59:47	5–3

12 min
Penalties
16 min
39
Shots
37

22 April 2022; 17:30 (CEST)	Jihlava	2–7 (1–2, 1–2, 0–3) score in the series: 1–3	Kladno	CZ LOKO ARÉNA, Jihlava; Attendance: 5,557

Game reference

Maksim Zhukov
Goalies
Landon Bow
Referees:
Vladimír Pešina
Adam Kika
Linesmen:
Jiří Ondráček
Daniel Hynek

Helt (Havránek, Dundáček) – 08:26	1–0
	1–1	12:35 – Arzamastsev (Zikmund, Suchánek)
	1–2	19:27 – Baránek (Kubík, Plekanec) (PP1)
	1–3	20:28 – Kubík (Plekanec)
Cachnín (Mareš, Bilčík) – 27:25	2–3
	2–4	38:31 – Plekanec (Kubík)
	2–5	46:09 – Plekanec (Hlava, Wood)
	2–6	49:29 – Zikmund (Pytlík)
	2–7	53:15 – Kubík (Plekanec, Baránek)

29 min
Penalties
8 min
28
Shots
38

25 April 2022; 18:00 (CEST)	Kladno	6–3 (2–2, 1–1, 3–0) score in the series: 4–1	Jihlava	Rocknet aréna, Chomutov; Attendance: 4,500

Game reference

Landon Bow
Goalies
Maksim Zhukov
Referees:
Adam Kika
Roman Mrkva
Linesmen:
Tomáš Brejcha
Jiří Ondráček

Zikmund (Dotchin, Bow) (PP1) – 05:57	1–0
	1–1	11:59 – Seman (Helt, Kachyňa)
	1–2	15:55 – Čachotský (Menšík, Harkabus) (PP1)
Kubík (Baránek, Hlava) – 17:26	2–2
Beran (Plekanec, Kubík) (PP2) – 25:43	3–2
	3–3	38:58 – Seman (PP1)
Beran (Zikmund, Plekanec) (PP1) – 54:10	4–3
Plekanec (Hlava) – 54:52	5–3
Kubík (EN) – 59:58	6–3

6 min
Penalties
10 min
30
Shots
33

== Playoffs ==
Twelve teams qualify for the playoffs: the top four teams in the regular season have a bye to the quarterfinals, while teams ranked fifth to twelfth meet each other (5 versus 12, 6 versus 11, 7 versus 10, 8 versus 9) in a preliminary playoff round.

=== Bracket ===
Wild-card round (best-of-5)
8	Vítkovice	3
9	Olomouc	2
6	Plzeň	2
11	Mladá Boleslav	3
7	Liberec	3
10	Kometa Brno	2
5	Pardubice	3
12	Karlovy Vary	0

Quarter-finals (best-of-7)
2	Třinec	4
8	Vítkovice	0
1	Mountfield HK	1
11	Mladá Boleslav	4
3	Sparta Praha	4
7	Liberec	0
4	České Budějovice	4
5	Pardubice	1

Semi-finals (best-of-7)
2	Třinec	4
11	Mladá Boleslav	0
3	Sparta Praha	4
4	České Budějovice	1

Finals (best-of-7)
2	Třinec	4
3	Sparta Praha	2

=== Wild card round ===
Pardubice – Karlovy Vary 3–0
11.3.2022	Pardubice	Karlovy Vary	3-2
12.3.2022	Pardubice	Karlovy Vary	4-2
14.3.2022	Karlovy Vary	Pardubice	2-3 OT1
Pardubice won the series 3–0.

Liberec – Kometa Brno 3–2
11.3.2022	Liberec	Kometa Brno	4-3
12.3.2022	Liberec	Kometa Brno	3-2 OT1
14.3.2022	Kometa Brno	Liberec	4-2
15.3.2022	Kometa Brno	Liberec	3-2
17.3.2022	Liberec	Kometa Brno	6-1
Liberec won the series 3–2.

Plzeň – Mladá Boleslav 2–3
11.3.2022	Plzeň	Mladá Boleslav	3-2 OT1
12.3.2022	Plzeň	Mladá Boleslav	2-3
14.3.2022	Mladá Boleslav	Plzeň	5-3
15.3.2022	Mladá Boleslav	Plzeň	0-1
17.3.2022	Plzeň	Mladá Boleslav	2-3
Mladá Boleslav won the series 3–2.

Vítkovice – Olomouc 3–2
11.3.2022	Vítkovice	Olomouc	4-3 OT1
12.3.2022	Vítkovice	Olomouc	1-3
14.3.2022	Olomouc	Vítkovice	3-2
15.3.2022	Olomouc	Vítkovice	3-4
17.3.2022	Vítkovice	Olomouc	3-1
Vítkovice won the series 3–2.

=== Quarterfinals ===
Mountfield HK – Mladá Boleslav 1–4
19.3.2022	Mountfield HK	Mladá Boleslav	2-1
20.3.2022	Mountfield HK	Mladá Boleslav	2-3
23.3.2022	Mladá Boleslav	Mountfield HK	3-2 SO
24.3.2022	Mladá Boleslav	Mountfield HK	4-3 OT1
27.3.2022	Mountfield HK	Mladá Boleslav	3-4 OT1
Mladá Boleslav won the series 4–1.

Sparta Praha – Liberec 4–1
21.3.2022	Sparta Praha	Liberec	7-0
22.3.2022	Sparta Praha	Liberec	3-2
25.3.2022	Liberec	Sparta Praha	1-2
26.3.2022	Liberec	Sparta Praha	4-2
28.3.2022	Sparta Praha	Liberec	5-4 OT3
Sparta Praha won the series 4–1.

Třinec – Vítkovice 4–0
19.3.2022	Třinec	Vítkovice	3-0
20.3.2022	Třinec	Vítkovice	2-1
23.3.2022	Vítkovice	Třinec	1-2
24.3.2022	Vítkovice	Třinec	1-2
Třinec won the series 4–0.

České Budějovice – Pardubice 4–1
21.3.2022	České Budějovice	Pardubice	3-1
22.3.2022	České Budějovice	Pardubice	3-2
25.3.2022	Pardubice	České Budějovice	1-2
26.3.2022	Pardubice	České Budějovice	3-2
28.3.2022	České Budějovice	Pardubice	4-3
České Budějovice won the series 4–1.

=== Semifinals ===
Třinec – Mladá Boleslav 4–0
3.4.2022	Třinec	Mladá Boleslav	3-0
4.4.2022	Třinec	Mladá Boleslav	1-0 SO
7.4.2022	Mladá Boleslav	Třinec	3-4 OT
8.4.2022	Mladá Boleslav	Třinec	1-2
Třinec won the series 4–0.

Sparta Praha – České Budějovice 4–1
3.4.2022	Sparta Praha	České Budějovice	2-1
4.4.2022	Sparta Praha	České Budějovice	5-1
7.4.2022	České Budějovice	Sparta Praha	2-3 OT
8.4.2022	České Budějovice	Sparta Praha	3-1
11.4.2022	Sparta Praha	České Budějovice	3-2
Sparta Praha won the series 4–1.

=== Finals ===
18 April 2022; 17:00 (CEST)	Třinec	4–1 (0–1, 0–0, 4–0) score in the series: 1–0	Sparta Praha	Werk Arena, Třinec; Attendance: 5,400

Game reference

Ondřej Kacetl
Goalies
Július Hudáček
Referees:
Antonín Jeřábek
Oldřich Hejduk
Linesmen:
Daniel Hynek
Josef Špůr

	0–1	09:34 – Matushkin (Thorell, Chlapík) (PP1)
Svačina (Marinčin) – 44:49	1–1
Nestrašil (O. Kovařčík, Kundrátek) – 48:16	2–1
Chmielewski (Růžička) – 50:59	3–1
Marcinko – 57:36	4–1

6 min
Penalties
4 min
26
Shots
24

19 April 2022; 17:00 (CEST)	Třinec	1–2 (0–0, 0–1, 1–1) score in the series: 1–1	Sparta Praha	Werk Arena, Třinec; Attendance: 5,400

Game reference

Ondřej Kacetl
Goalies
Július Hudáček
Referees:
Vladimír Pešina
Robin Šír
Linesmen:
Miroslav Lhotský
Jiří Svoboda

	0–1	32:28 – Řepík (Forman, Polášek)
	0–2	53:41 – Pavelka (Řepík)
Hrňa (Nestrašil, Růžička) – 58:28	1–2

4 min
Penalties
8 min
31
Shots
29

22 April 2022; 18:30 (CEST)	Sparta Praha	2–3 (1–0, 0–2, 1–1) score in the series: 1–2	Třinec	O_{2} Arena, Prague; Attendance: 17,220

Game reference

Július Hudáček
Goalies
Ondřej Kacetl
Referees:
Roman Mrkva
Daniel Pražák
Linesmen:
Tomáš Brejcha
Vít Lederer

Řepík (Sobotka, Forman) – 09:16	1–0
	1–1	28:51 – Marcinko (Marinčin, Hrňa) (PP1)
	1–2	37:07 – Nestrašil (Kundrátek)
	1–3	47:25 – Dravecký (Roman, Hrehorčák)
Kaše (Němeček, Řepík) – 59:44	2–3

13 min
Penalties
15 min
21
Shots
21

23 April 2022; 17:00 (CEST)	Sparta Praha	5–2 (0–1, 3–0, 2–1) score in the series: 2–2	Třinec	O_{2} Arena, Prague; Attendance: 17,220

Game reference

Július Hudáček
Goalies
Ondřej Kacetl
Referees:
Antonín Jeřábek
Oldřich Hejduk
Linesmen:
Miroslav Lhotský
Jiří Svoboda

	0–1	15:49 – Nestrašil (M. Kovařčík, Zahradníček)
Němeček (Matushkin, Sobotka) – 20:30	1–1
Šmerha – 22:21	2–1
Sobotka (Šmerha) – 32:17	3–1
Buchtele (Kaše, Šmerha) – 46:42	4–1
	4–2	49:41 – Zbořil (Marcinko, Svačina)
Forman (Matushkin, Thorell) (PP1) – 58:08	5–2

4 min
Penalties
8 min
24
Shots
29

26 April 2022; 17:00 (CEST)	Třinec	7–3 (2–2, 4–1, 1–0) score in the series: 3–2	Sparta Praha	Werk Arena, Třinec; Attendance: 5,400

Game reference

Ondřej Kacetl
Goalies
Július Hudáček
Referees:
Vladimír Pešina
Robin Šír
Linesmen:
Daniel Hynek
Josef Špůr

Daňo (Růžička) – 06:27	1–0
	1–1	07:08 – Němeček
	1–2	09:52 – Dvořák (Matushkin, Němeček)
Daňo (Růžička) – 11:26	2–2
O. Kovařčík (M. Kovařčík, Nestrašil) – 22:17	3–2
Marinčin (Dravecký, Hrehorčák) – 22:50	4–2
	4–3	25:28 – Šmerha (Moravčík)
Hrňa (Marinčin) (PP1) – 26:41	5–3
Růžička (Zbořil) – 37:38	6–3
O. Kovařčík (Nestrašil) – 47:58	7–3

6 min
Penalties
8 min
28
Shots
31

28 April 2022; 19:00 (CEST)	Sparta Praha	1–2 (0–2, 0–0, 1–0) score in the series: 2–4	Třinec	O_{2} Arena, Prague; Attendance: 17,220

Game reference

Július Hudáček
Goalies
Ondřej Kacetl
Referees:
Antonín Jeřábek
Oldřich Hejduk
Linesmen:
Miroslav Lhotský
Jiří Svoboda

	0–1	14:13 – Dravecký (Roman)
	0–2	15:48 – Svačina (PS)
Horák (Řepík) – 52:43	1–2

4 min
Penalties
4 min
25
Shots
19

== Final rankings ==
Gold medal	Třinec
Silver medal	Sparta Praha
Bronze medal	České Budějovice
4	Mladá Boleslav
5	Mountfield HK
6	Pardubice
7	Liberec
8	Vítkovice
9	Plzeň
10	Olomouc
11	Kometa Brno
12	Karlovy Vary
13	Litvínov
14	Kladno
15	Zlín
