= 2014 Channel One Cup =

Tournament details
- Host countries: Russia; Czechia
- Cities: Moscow; Prague
- Venues: 2 (in 2 host cities)
- Dates: 18–21 December 2014
- Teams: 4

Final positions
- Champions: Russia (15th title)
- Runners-up: Finland
- Third place: Sweden
- Fourth place: Czech Republic

Tournament statistics
- Games played: 6
- Goals scored: 32 (5.33 per game)
- Attendance: 57,226 (9,538 per game)
- Scoring leader(s): (Sweden) Patrik Hersley (Sweden) Jimmie Ericsson (Sweden) Linus Omark (5 points)

The 2014 Channel One Cup was played between 18 and 21 December 2014. The Czech Republic, Finland, Sweden and Russia played a round-robin for a total of three games per team and six games in total. Five of the matches were played in the Bolshoy Ice Dome in Sochi, Russia, and one match in the O2 Arena in Prague, Czech Republic. The tournament was part of 2014–15 Euro Hockey Tour. The tournament was won by Russia.

== Standings ==
Pos	Team	Pld	W	OTW	OTL	L	GF	GA	GD	Pts
1	Russia	3	3	0	0	0	8	4	+4	9
2	Finland	3	0	2	0	1	6	6	0	4
3	Sweden	3	1	0	1	1	10	10	0	4
4	Czech Republic	3	0	0	1	2	8	12	−4	1

Source: eurohockey

== Games ==
All times are local. Moscow – (Moscow Time – UTC+3) Prague – (Central European Time – UTC+1)

18 December 2014; 18:30	Czech Republic	4-6 (2-0, 2-3, 0-3)	Sweden	O2 Arena, Prague; Attendance: 16,348

Game reference

Pavel Francouz
Goalies
Anders Nilsson
Referees:
(Finland) Antti Boman
(Finland) Jari Levonen

Kovář (Radil, Zatovic) – 13:04	1-0
Birner (Horák) – 13:56	2-0
Cervenka (Klepis, Zamorsky) – 23:26	3-0
	3-1	30:17 – Hersley (Omark, Ericsson)
	3-2	30:33 – Hersley (Petersson)
	3-3	31:31 – Fransson (Omark, Möller) (PP)
Nemec (Krajicek, Cervenka) (PP) – 35:21	4-3
	4-4	43:17 – Fransson (Omark, Ericsson)
	4-5	54:56 – Janmark-Nylén (Junland)
	4-6	56:15 – Johnsson (Sjögren)

16 min
Penalties
29 min
24
Shots
33

18 December 2014; 19:00	Russia	2-0 (1-0, 0-0, 1-0)	Finland	Bolshoy Ice Dome, Sochi; Attendance: 12,000

Game reference
Alexander Yeryomenko	Goalies	Atte Engren	Referees: (Russia) Vladimir Pesina (Russia) Martin Frano
Medvedev (Zaripov) (PP) – 19:02 / 1-0; Plotnikov (Shipachyov, Kovalchuk) (EN) – 59:43 / 2-0			Referees: (Russia) Vladimir Pesina (Russia) Martin Frano
8 min	Penalties	10 min	Referees: (Russia) Vladimir Pesina (Russia) Martin Frano
25	Shots	27	Referees: (Russia) Vladimir Pesina (Russia) Martin Frano

20 December 2014; 14:00	Sweden	2-3 (0-1, 2-1, 0-1)	Russia	Bolshoy Ice Dome, Sochi; Attendance: 10,100

Game reference

Anders Nilsson
Goalies
Konstantin Barulin
Referees:
(Czech Republic) Martin Frano
(Czech Republic) Vladimir Pesina

	0-1	04:57 – Belov (Kovalchuk, Chudinov) (PP)
Ericsson (Omark, Möller) – 24:06	1-1
Hersley (Thörnberg) – 28:14	2-1
	2-2	38:10 – Kovalchuk (Chudinov, Shipachyov) (PP)
	2-3	43:11 – Kovalchuk (Chudinov, Shipachyov)

10 min
Penalties
12 min
27
Shots
19

20 December 2014; 18:00	Finland	3-2 GWS (1-0, 0-2, 1-0) (OT: 0–0) (SO: 1–0)	Czech Republic	Bolshoy Ice Dome, Sochi; Attendance: 4,684

Game reference

Mikko Koskinen
Goalies
Jakub Kovar
Referees:
(Russia) Vyacheslav Bulanov
(Russia) Sergei Karabanov

Lepistö (Pesonen, Ramstedt) – 19:02	1-0
	1-1	23:42 – Radil (Sobotka)
	1-2	25:53 – Simon (Mozik)
Salminen (Hietanen, Lepistö) (PP) – 41:48	2-2

Donskoi
Shootout

6 min
Penalties
8 min
24
Shots
31

21 December 2014; 14:00	Russia	3-2 (2-0, 1-1, 0-1)	Czech Republic	Bolshoy Ice Dome, Sochi; Attendance: 10,453

Game reference

Stanislav Galimov
Goalies
Jakub Kovar
Referees:
(Sweden) Mikael Sjöqvist
(Sweden) Marcus Linde

Kutuzov (Zubov, Parshin) – 14:16	1-0
Grigorenko (Parshin, Zubov) – 19:30	2-0
Yakovlev (Zaripov) – 24:21	3-0
	3-1	31:06 – Kovář (Mozik, Hrňa) (PP)
	3-2	47:38 – Hrňa (Zatovic)

6 min
Penalties
4 min
21
Shots
19

21 December 2014; 18:00	Finland	3-2 GWS (1-0, 1-2, 0-0) (OT: 0–0) (SO: 1–0)	Sweden	Bolshoy Ice Dome, Sochi; Attendance: 3,641

Game reference

Mikko Koskinen
Goalies
Henrik Karlsson
Referees:
(Russia) Alexey Anisimov
(Russia) Vyacheslav Bulanov

Donskoi (Lepistö) – 13:36	1-0
	1-1	23:14 – Möller (Hersley, Ericsson) (PP)
Salminen (Lepistö, Immonen) – 29:14	2-1
	2-2	37:24 – Ericsson (Hersley, Omark)
	3-2

Salminen
Shootout

12 min
Penalties
14 min
26
Shots
38

== Scoring leaders ==
Pos	Player	Country	GP	G	A	Pts	+/−	PIM	POS
1	Patrik Hersley	Sweden	3	3	2	5	+3	4	D
2	Jimmie Ericsson	Sweden	3	2	3	5	+2	2	F
3	Linus Omark	Sweden	3	0	5	5	+2	0	F
4	Ilya Kovalchuk	Russia	3	2	2	4	+1	2	F
5	Sami Lepistö	Finland	3	1	3	4	+3	2	D

GP = Games played; G = Goals; A = Assists; Pts = Points; +/− = Plus/minus; PIM = Penalties in minutes; POS = Position
Source: quanthockey

== Goaltending leaders ==
Pos	Player	Country	TOI	GA	GAA	Sv%	SO
1	Mikko Koskinen	Sweden	130:00	4	1.85	94.20	0
2	Henrik Karlsson	Finland	124:38	5	2.41	88.64	0
3	Jakub Kovář	Czech Republic	124:04	5	2.42	88.64	0

TOI = Time on ice (minutes:seconds); SA = Shots against; GA = Goals against; GAA = Goals Against Average; Sv% = Save percentage; SO = Shutouts
Source: swehockey
