= Miloš Roman =

Slovak ice hockey player

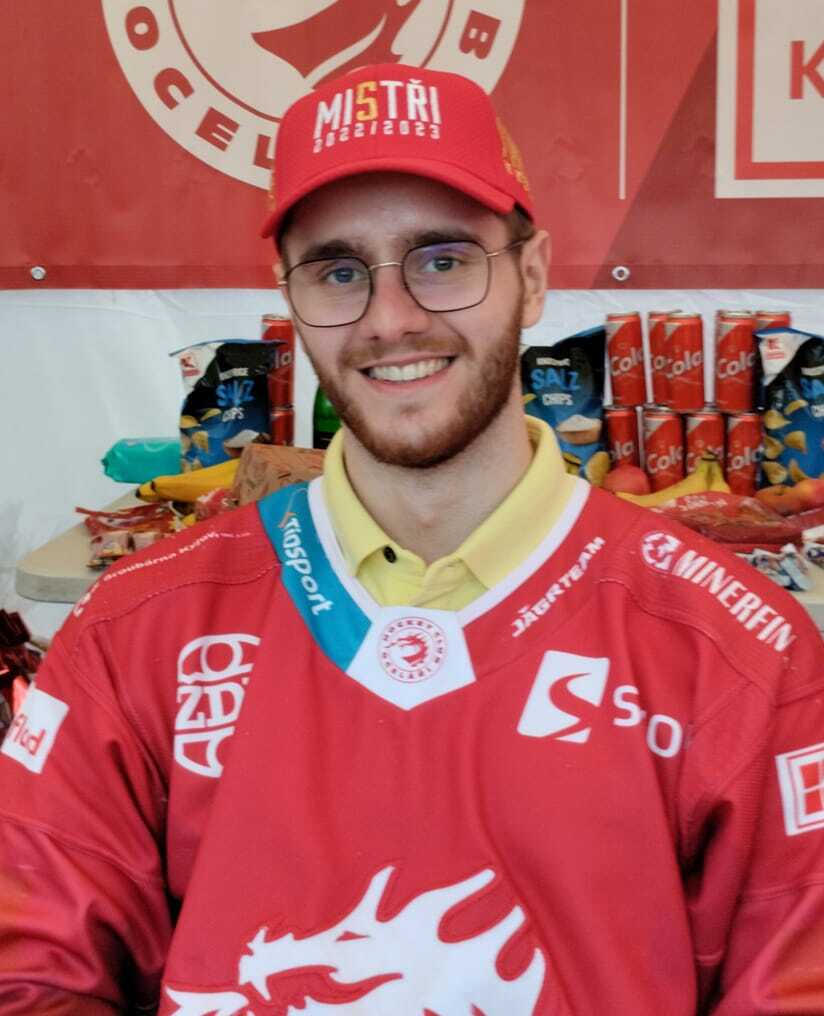
- Born: 6 November 1999 (age 26) Kysucké Nové Mesto, Slovakia
- Height: 6 ft 0 in (183 cm)
- Weight: 188 lb (85 kg; 13 st 6 lb)
- Position: Centre
- Shoots: Left
- ELH team Former teams: HC Oceláři Třinec; HC Frýdek-Místek
- National team: Slovakia
- NHL draft: 122nd overall, 2018; Calgary Flames
- Playing career: 2016–present

Miloš Roman (born 6 November 1999) is a Slovak professional ice hockey player who currently for HC Oceláři Třinec of the Czech Extraliga.

Medal record

Representing Slovakia

Ice hockey

Olympic Games
Bronze medal – third place	2022 Beijing	

== Career statistics ==
=== Regular season and playoffs ===
			Regular season					Playoffs
Season	Team	League	GP	G	A	Pts	PIM	GP	G	A	Pts	PIM
2013–14	HC Oceláři Třinec	CZE U18	19	10	6	16	6	2	0	1	1	0
2014–15	HC Oceláři Třinec	CZE U18	36	23	19	42	18	10	1	4	5	0
2015–16	HC Oceláři Třinec	CZE U18	1	0	0	0	0	1	0	2	2	0
2015–16	HC Oceláři Třinec	CZE U20	35	16	21	37	18	9	5	5	10	4
2016–17	HC Oceláři Třinec	CZE U20	2	1	2	3	2	10	6	6	12	4
2016–17	HC Oceláři Třinec	ELH	1	0	0	0	0	—	—	—	—	—
2016–17	HC Frýdek–Místek	Czech.1	29	4	2	6	24	10	1	1	2	2
2017–18	Vancouver Giants	WHL	39	10	22	32	10	7	3	3	6	4
2018–19	Vancouver Giants	WHL	59	27	33	60	21	22	4	8	12	12
2019–20	Vancouver Giants	WHL	62	24	23	47	28	—	—	—	—	—
2020–21	HC Oceláři Třinec	ELH	34	7	5	12	10	16	2	1	3	2
2021–22	HC Oceláři Třinec	ELH	46	10	14	24	16	14	2	3	5	2
2022–23	HC Oceláři Třinec	ELH	47	4	5	9	10	22	0	3	3	6
2023–24	HC Oceláři Třinec	ELH	49	8	10	18	16	21	3	0	3	0
2024–25	HC Oceláři Třinec	ELH	51	5	8	13	6	9	1	1	2	4
2025–26	HC Oceláři Třinec	ELH	52	5	7	12	20	19	5	0	5	6
ELH totals			280	39	49	88	78	101	13	8	21	20

=== International ===
Year	Team	Event	GP	G	A	Pts	PIM
2015	Slovakia	U17	5	0	0	0	0
2015	Slovakia	IH18	4	1	3	4	2
2016	Slovakia	WJC18	5	1	1	2	0
2016	Slovakia	IH18	4	0	5	5	0
2017	Slovakia	WJC	4	1	1	2	2
2017	Slovakia	WJC18	5	1	1	2	0
2018	Slovakia	WJC	5	2	0	2	0
2019	Slovakia	WJC	5	3	1	4	2
2021	Slovakia	WC	7	0	1	1	4
2021	Slovakia	OGQ	2	1	0	1	0
2022	Slovakia	OG	7	0	1	1	0
2022	Slovakia	WC	8	1	2	3	0
2024	Slovakia	OGQ	3	0	0	0	0
2025	Slovakia	WC	7	0	0	0	0
Junior totals			37	9	12	21	6
Senior totals			34	2	4	6	4

== Awards and honors ==
Award	Year
Czech
Champion	2021; 2022; 2023
