= Martin Marinčin =

Slovak ice hockey player (born 1992)

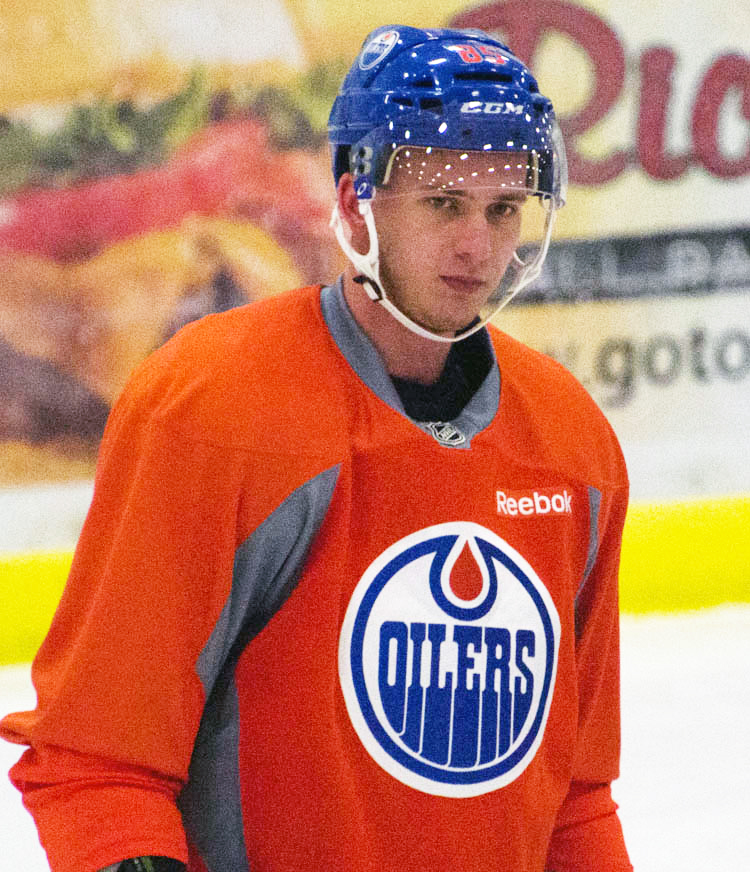
- Marinčin with the Edmonton Oilers in 2014
- Born: 18 February 1992 (age 34) Košice, Czechoslovakia
- Height: 6 ft 4 in (193 cm)
- Weight: 210 lb (95 kg; 15 st 0 lb)
- Position: Defence
- Shoots: Left
- ELH team Former teams: HC Oceláři Třinec; Edmonton Oilers; Toronto Maple Leafs
- National team: Slovakia
- NHL draft: 46th overall, 2010; Edmonton Oilers
- Playing career: 2009–present

Martin Marinčin (pronounced [ˈmartin ˈmarintʂin]; born 18 February 1992) is a Slovak professional ice hockey player who is a defenceman for HC Oceláři Třinec of the Czech Extraliga (ELH). He was drafted in the second round, 46th overall, by the Edmonton Oilers in the 2010 NHL entry draft.

== Playing career ==
Having been drafted by the Edmonton Oilers in the second round, 46th overall, at the 2010 NHL entry draft, on 25 April 2011, the Oilers signed Marinčin to a three-year, entry-level contract. During the 2013–14 season, Marinčin was called up to the Oilers, and on 5 December 2013, he made his NHL debut in a game against the Colorado Avalanche.

On 27 June 2015, Marinčin was traded to the Toronto Maple Leafs in exchange for Brad Ross and a fourth-round pick in the 2015 NHL entry draft.

On 5 October 2017, Marinčin was placed on waivers by the Maple Leafs. After clearing waivers the next day, he was loaned to the Maple Leafs' American Hockey League (AHL) affiliate, the Toronto Marlies. On 17 December 2017, he was recalled to the Toronto Maple Leafs after Nikita Zaitsev was placed on the injured reserve with a lower-body injury. Marinčin appeared in two games with the Leafs before being sent down to the Marlies on 5 January 2018.

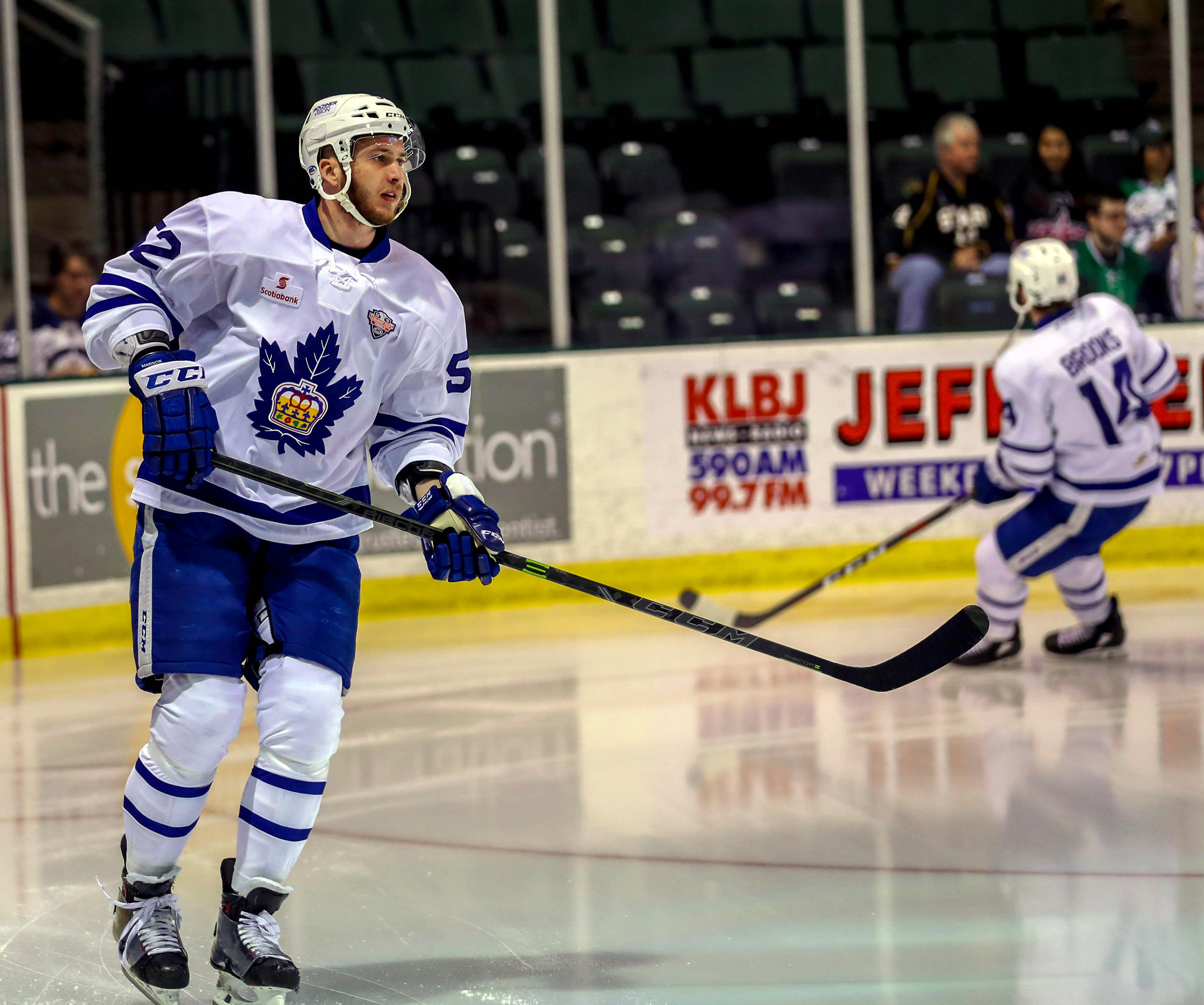
Marinčin with the Toronto Marlies during the 2018 Calder Cup Final

On 29 June 2019, Marinčin agreed to a one-year $700,000 contract extension to remain with the Maple Leafs. On 10 January 2020, Marinčin agreed to another one-year $700,000 contract extension to remain with the Maple Leafs.

After six seasons within the Maple Leafs organization, Marinčin left as an impending free agent, returning to Europe in signing a one-year contract with the Czech club, HC Oceláři Třinec of the ELH, on 16 June 2021.

== International play ==
Medal record

Representing Slovakia

Ice hockey

Olympic Games
Bronze medal – third place	2022 Beijing	

Marinčin was chosen to play for Slovakia at the 2011 World Junior Championships. During a game against the United States, he was ejected for a hit to the head on forward Jason Zucker. This ejection carried an automatic one-game suspension, and after a review of the play, Marinčin was suspended for an additional three games.

Marinčin was named to the Slovak senior team to compete at the 2014 Winter Olympics in Sochi.

== Career statistics ==
=== Regular season and playoffs ===
			Regular season					Playoffs
Season	Team	League	GP	G	A	Pts	PIM	GP	G	A	Pts	PIM
2006–07	HC Košice	SVK U18	16	0	3	3	6	—	—	—	—	—
2007–08	HC Košice	SVK U18	60	3	29	32	36	—	—	—	—	—
2008–09	HC Košice	SVK U18	5	4	4	8	35	—	—	—	—	—
2008–09	HC Košice	SVK U20	46	11	15	26	50	3	0	0	0	0
2009–10	HK Orange 20	SVK	35	2	4	6	71	—	—	—	—	—
2009–10	HC Košice	SVK U20	—	—	—	—	—	2	0	0	0	0
2010–11	Prince George Cougars	WHL	67	14	42	56	65	4	1	4	5	6
2010–11	Oklahoma City Barons	AHL	1	0	0	0	2	—	—	—	—	—
2011–12	Prince George Cougars	WHL	30	4	13	17	25	—	—	—	—	—
2011–12	Regina Pats	WHL	28	7	16	23	10	5	2	0	2	6
2011–12	Oklahoma City Barons	AHL	6	0	1	1	2	—	—	—	—	—
2012–13	Oklahoma City Barons	AHL	69	7	23	30	40	17	1	6	7	2
2013–14	Oklahoma City Barons	AHL	24	3	4	7	4	—	—	—	—	—
2013–14	Edmonton Oilers	NHL	44	0	6	6	16	—	—	—	—	—
2014–15	Oklahoma City Barons	AHL	28	0	7	7	20	8	0	2	2	6
2014–15	Edmonton Oilers	NHL	41	1	4	5	16	—	—	—	—	—
2015–16	Toronto Maple Leafs	NHL	65	1	6	7	34	—	—	—	—	—
2016–17	Toronto Maple Leafs	NHL	25	1	6	7	16	6	0	0	0	2
2017–18	Toronto Maple Leafs	NHL	2	0	0	0	2	—	—	—	—	—
2017–18	Toronto Marlies	AHL	52	4	16	20	18	20	1	6	7	6
2018–19	Toronto Maple Leafs	NHL	24	1	4	5	12	—	—	—	—	—
2018–19	Toronto Marlies	AHL	8	1	3	4	0	—	—	—	—	—
2019–20	Toronto Maple Leafs	NHL	26	1	3	4	14	3	0	0	0	0
2019–20	Toronto Marlies	AHL	5	0	1	1	2	—	—	—	—	—
2020–21	Toronto Marlies	AHL	14	1	4	5	8	—	—	—	—	—
2021–22	HC Oceláři Třinec	ELH	42	4	11	15	18	14	1	3	4	10
2022–23	HC Oceláři Třinec	ELH	48	2	12	14	28	22	2	5	7	14
2023–24	HC Oceláři Třinec	ELH	46	3	16	19	18	16	0	4	4	4
2024–25	HC Oceláři Třinec	ELH	20	1	4	5	12	8	0	3	3	8
2025–26	HC Oceláři Třinec	ELH	52	3	6	9	24	19	1	3	4	10
NHL totals			227	5	29	34	110	9	0	0	0	2
ELH totals			208	13	49	62	100	79	4	18	22	46

=== International ===
Year	Team	Event	Result	GP	G	A	Pts	PIM
2009	Slovakia	WJC18	7th	6	0	1	1	4
2010	Slovakia	WJC	8th	6	0	2	2	6
2010	Slovakia	WJC18	8th	6	2	1	3	8
2011	Slovakia	WJC	8th	2	0	0	0	27
2012	Slovakia	WJC	6th	6	1	2	3	2
2014	Slovakia	OG	11th	4	0	0	0	4
2014	Slovakia	WC	9th	7	1	1	2	12
2016	Slovakia	WC	9th	7	0	2	2	4
2019	Slovakia	WC	9th	7	3	4	7	0
2021	Slovakia	OGQ	Q	3	0	0	0	0
2022	Slovakia	OG	3rd place, bronze medalist(s)	7	1	0	1	0
2026	Slovakia	OG	4th	6	0	0	0	8
Junior totals				26	3	6	9	53
Senior totals				41	5	7	12	28

== Awards and honors ==
Awards	Year
AHL
Calder Cup (Toronto Marlies)	2018
