= Michal Řepík =

Czech ice hockey player

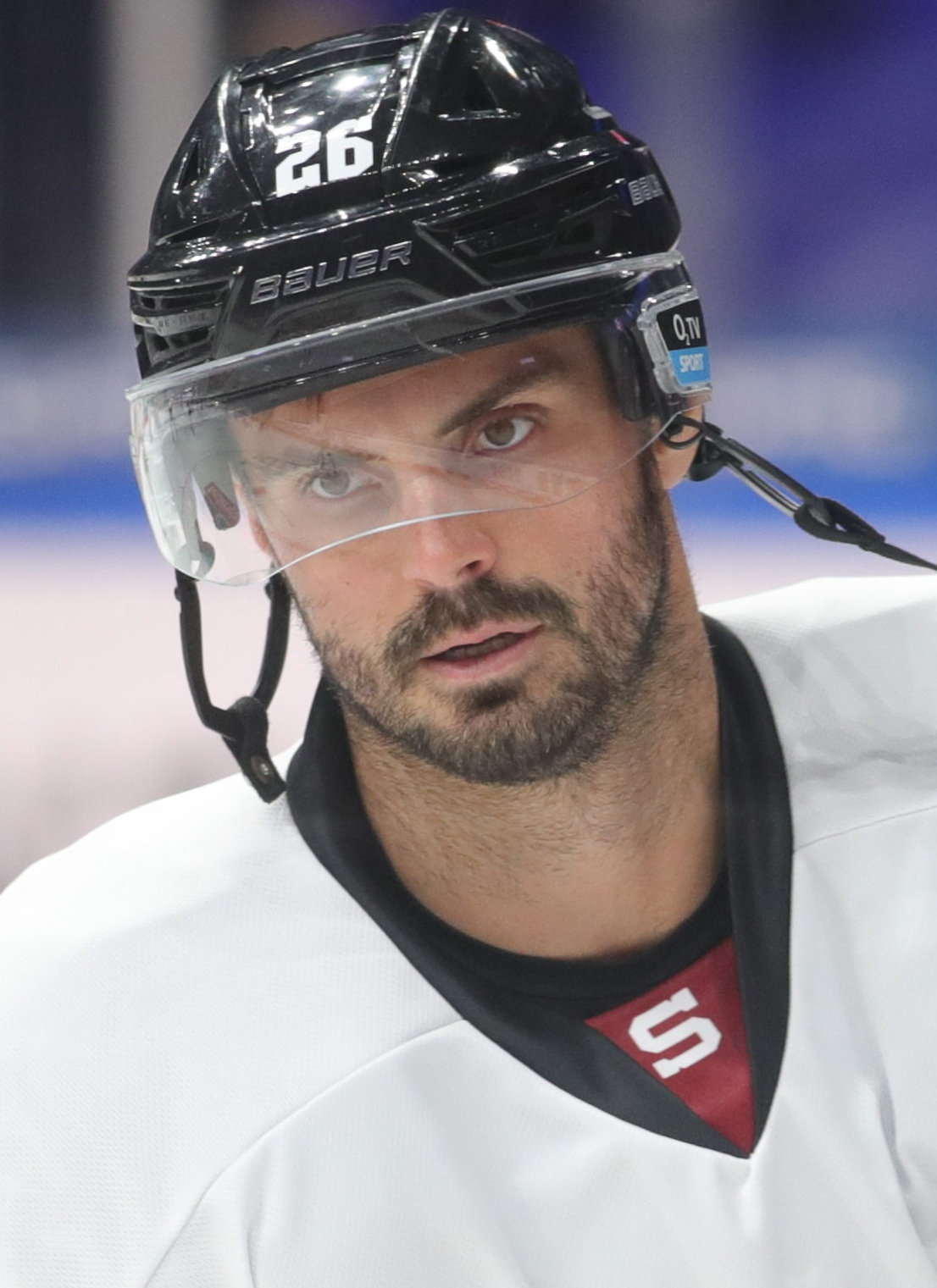
- Řepík in 2023
- Born: 31 December 1988 (age 37) Vlašim, Czechoslovakia
- Height: 5 ft 10 in (178 cm)
- Weight: 192 lb (87 kg; 13 st 10 lb)
- Position: Left Wing
- Shoots: Right
- ELH team Former teams: HC Sparta Praha; Florida Panthers; HC Lev Praha; Lahti Pelicans; EV Zug; HC Bílí Tygři Liberec; Traktor Chelyabinsk; HC Slovan Bratislava; HC Vityaz
- National team: Czech Republic
- NHL draft: 40th overall, 2007; Florida Panthers
- Playing career: 2008–present

Michal Řepík (born 31 December 1988) is a Czech professional ice hockey left winger. He is currently under contract with HC Sparta Praha of the Czech Extraliga (ELH). Repik was selected by the Florida Panthers in the 2nd round (40th overall) of the 2007 NHL entry draft.

== Playing career ==
Before his professional career, Repik played major junior in the Western Hockey League (WHL). He spent three seasons with the Vancouver Giants, helping the team to a Presidents' Cup as WHL champions in 2006 and a Memorial Cup as Canadian Hockey League (CHL) champions in 2007. During the Giants' 2007 playoff season, he led the WHL and Memorial Cup tournaments in scoring. Selected 40th overall in the 2007 NHL entry draft by the Panthers, Repik turned professional in 2008–09 with the team's American Hockey League (AHL) affiliate.

=== Amateur ===
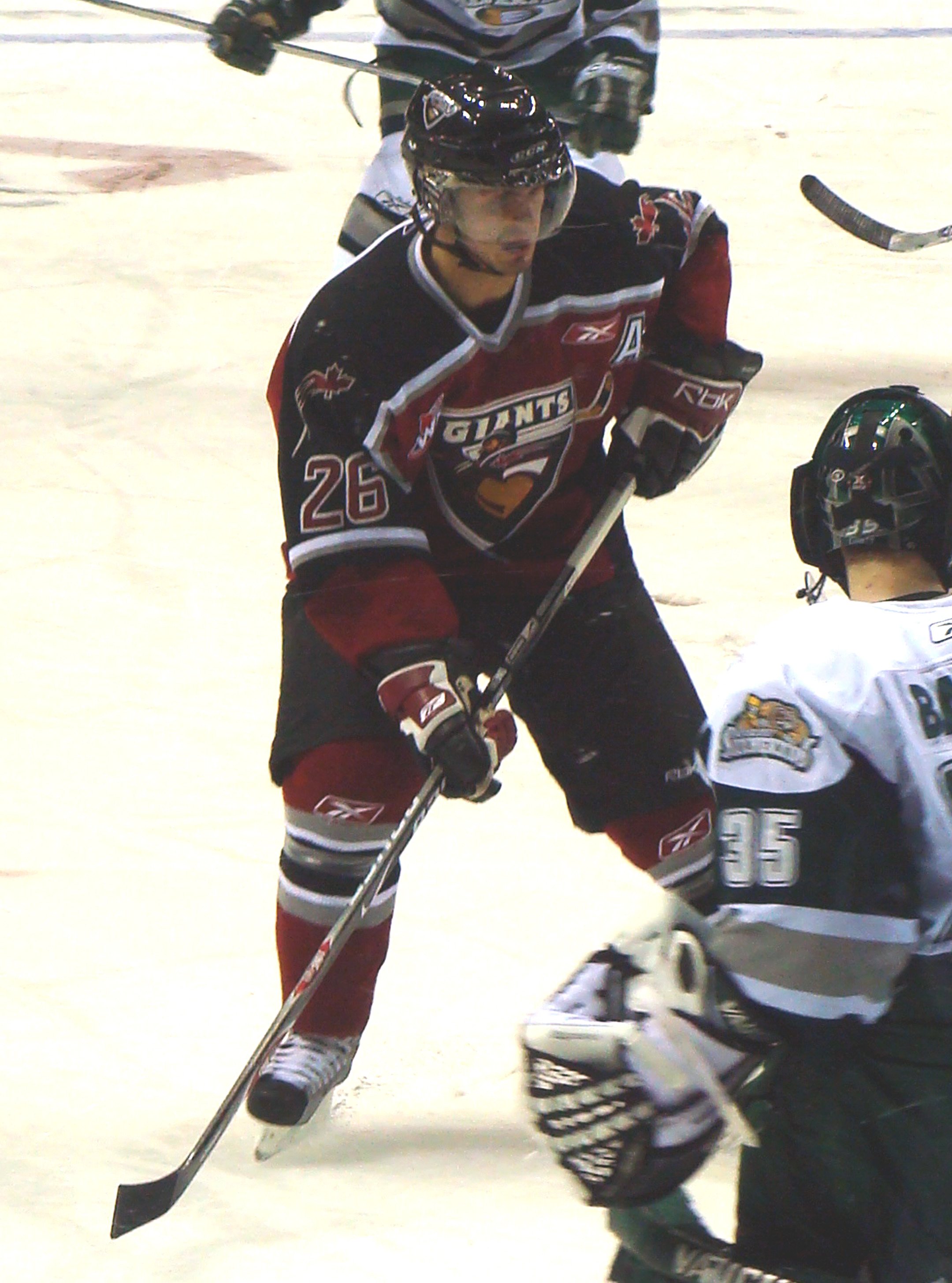
Repik playing for the Vancouver Giants in 2007.

After being selected 25th overall by the Vancouver Giants in the 2005 Canadian Hockey League (CHL) Import Draft, Řepík moved from Slovakia to join the team in 2005–06. He scored 24 goals and 52 points over 69 games, ranking fifth among league rookies in scoring. He added 3 goals and 6 points over 14 playoff games, helping the Giants win the Presidents' Cup as WHL champions. Their win qualified them for the 2006 Memorial Cup, where they were eliminated in the semifinal. Repik scored at a near-point-per-game pace the following season with 55 points over 56 games. During the 2007 WHL playoffs, he scored 26 points over 22 games to lead the league in scoring. The Giants advanced to the WHL Finals, where they were defeated in seven games by the Medicine Hat Tigers. Despite their defeat, they qualified for the 2007 Memorial Cup as they had been chosen to host the tournament at the beginning of the season. Repik continued his scoring pace in the CHL tournament, earning the Ed Chynoweth Trophy as the Memorial Cup's leading scorer. The Giants met the Tigers once more in the Memorial Cup Final and defeated them to win the national title.

In the subsequent 2007 NHL entry draft, he was drafted in the 2nd round, 40th overall, by the Florida Panthers. At midseason, he had been ranked 46th among draft-eligible skaters playing in North America by Central Scouting Services. Upon being drafted, Řepík returned to the WHL for a third and final season with Vancouver and scored a junior career-high 61 points. He was limited to just 51 games after suffering a concussion on a hit from Everett Silvertips defenceman Dane Crowley on 1 December 2007 (the injury has affected Řepík's sense of smell up to his rookie season in the AHL). Defending their Memorial Cup title, the Giants were eliminated in the second round of the WHL playoffs by eventual 2008 Memorial Cup champions, the Spokane Chiefs.

=== Professional ===
The Panthers assigned Řepík to the Rochester Americans of the American Hockey League (AHL) for his first professional season in 2008–09. Called up from Rochester in December, he scored his first NHL goal in his NHL debut on 8 December 2008, in a 4–3 overtime victory over the Ottawa Senators. He played in 5 games total for the Panthers during the season, tallying two goals. With the Americans, he recorded 49 points in 75 games.

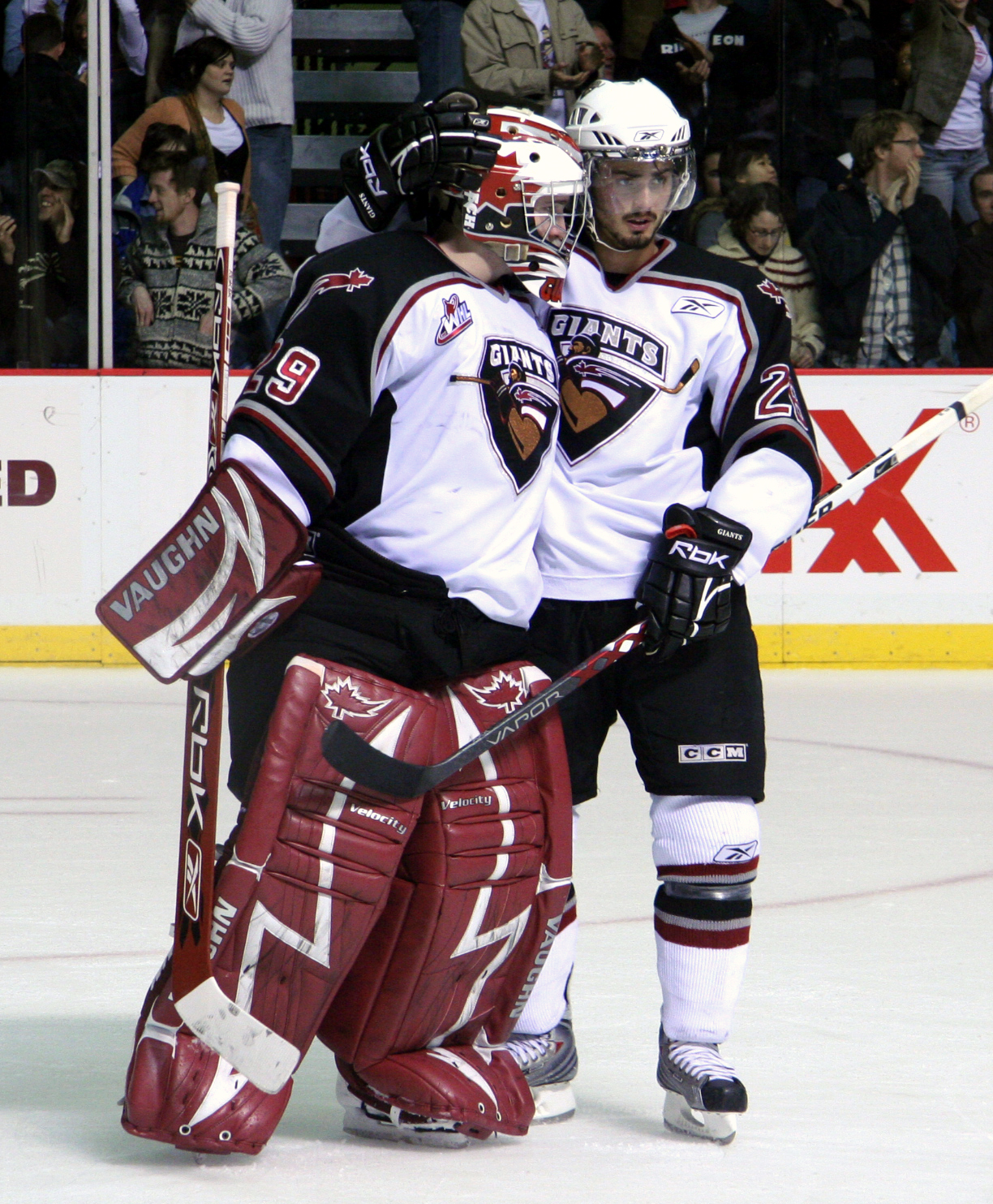
Repik and Tyson Sexsmith following a Giants playoff game in 2007.

In 2009–10, Repik saw increased time with the Panthers, appearing in 19 NHL games with three goals and two assists. He had 22 goals and 31 assists over 60 games for most of the season with the Americans. He struggled to score in the 2010 AHL playoffs, however, recording a goal and an assist over seven games. Repik was sent back to the AHL out of training camp in the following season. After recording 22 points over the first 17 games of the season (tying him for second in league scoring at the time), he was recalled by the Panthers in mid-November 2010. A spot was freed up in the lineup after winger Steve Bernier suffered a fractured orbital bone. He spent the season splitting time between Rochester and Florida once more and finished with 45 points over 53 AHL games and 8 points over 31 NHL games. His play earned him an invitation to the 2011 AHL All-Star Game, representing PlanetUSA.

After four seasons within the Panthers organization, Řepík left as a free agent and returned to the Czech Republic by signing a multi-year contract with HC Lev Praha of the Kontinental Hockey League on 20 June 2012. He played two seasons with Lev before the club dissolved and signed for a season with Lahti Pelicans in the Finnish Liiga before ending the 2014–15 season with EV Zug of the Swiss National League A.

On 22 April 2015, Řepík signed a two-year contract to return to the Czech Republic with HC Bílí Tygři Liberec of the Czech Extraliga.

On 16 July 2018, Řepík agreed to extend his contract with HC Slovan Bratislava, signing a one-year deal for the 2018–19 season. He contributed offensively with 21 points through 42 games before he was transferred by the out of contention Bratislava to Russian club, HC Vityaz on 26 December 2018.

== International play ==
Řepík competed for the Czech Republic's under-20 team at the 2007 World Junior Championships in Sweden. He failed to register a point in six games as Sweden eliminated the Czechs in the quarter-finals. Poised to make a second appearance at the World Junior Championships in 2008 in his home country, Řepík was unable to participate due to a concussion suffered in the month preceding the tournament.

== Career statistics ==
=== Regular season and playoffs ===
			Regular season					Playoffs
Season	Team	League	GP	G	A	Pts	PIM	GP	G	A	Pts	PIM
2002–03	HC Sparta Praha	CZE U18	18	7	10	17	6	2	0	0	0	0
2003–04	HC Sparta Praha	CZE U18	33	25	17	42	42	3	0	0	0	0
2003–04	HC Sparta Praha	CZE U20	23	12	5	17	10	—	—	—	—	—
2004–05	HC Sparta Praha	CZE U18	2	2	3	5	6	—	—	—	—	—
2004–05	HC Sparta Praha	CZE U20	45	26	31	57	24	8	2	4	6	10
2005–06	Vancouver Giants	WHL	69	24	28	52	55	14	3	3	6	19
2006–07	Vancouver Giants	WHL	56	24	31	55	56	22	10	16	26	24
2007–08	Vancouver Giants	WHL	51	27	34	61	62	10	5	6	11	18
2008–09	Rochester Americans	AHL	75	19	30	49	58	—	—	—	—	—
2008–09	Florida Panthers	NHL	5	2	0	2	2	—	—	—	—	—
2009–10	Florida Panthers	NHL	19	3	2	5	6	—	—	—	—	—
2009–10	Rochester Americans	AHL	60	22	31	53	57	7	1	1	2	4
2010–11	Rochester Americans	AHL	53	11	34	45	38	—	—	—	—	—
2010–11	Florida Panthers	NHL	31	2	6	8	22	—	—	—	—	—
2011–12	San Antonio Rampage	AHL	55	14	21	35	51	4	1	3	4	6
2011–12	Florida Panthers	NHL	17	2	3	5	6	—	—	—	—	—
2012–13	HC Lev Praha	KHL	47	4	6	10	32	4	1	2	3	8
2013–14	HC Lev Praha	KHL	51	8	4	12	32	22	4	6	10	22
2014–15	Pelicans	Liiga	48	9	22	31	18	—	—	—	—	—
2014–15	EV Zug	NLA	4	2	1	3	0	3	0	2	2	0
2015–16	Bílí Tygři Liberec	ELH	40	18	17	35	32	14	10	4	14	16
2016–17	Traktor Chelyabinsk	KHL	2	0	0	0	2	—	—	—	—	—
2016–17	HC Sparta Praha	ELH	22	7	9	16	41	4	1	1	2	2
2017–18	HC Slovan Bratislava	KHL	51	12	11	23	14	—	—	—	—	—
2017–18	HC Sparta Praha	ELH	7	3	3	6	6	3	0	2	2	0
2018–19	HC Slovan Bratislava	KHL	42	10	11	21	18	—	—	—	—	—
2018–19	HC Vityaz	KHL	19	5	4	9	4	4	0	0	0	0
2019–20	HC Sparta Praha	ELH	47	23	14	37	42	—	—	—	—	—
2020–21	HC Sparta Praha	ELH	52	26	27	53	34	11	6	7	13	8
2021–22	HC Sparta Praha	ELH	48	24	18	42	24	16	4	5	9	8
NHL totals			72	9	11	20	36	—	—	—	—	—
KHL totals			212	39	36	75	102	30	5	8	13	30
ELH totals			216	101	88	189	179	48	21	19	40	34

=== International ===
Year	Team	Event	Result	GP	G	A	Pts	PIM
2005	Czech Republic	U18	2nd place, silver medalist(s)	5	2	0	2	4
2007	Czech Republic	WJC	5th	6	0	0	0	0
2016	Czech Republic	WC	5th	8	2	2	4	16
2017	Czech Republic	WC	7th	8	3	2	5	4
2018	Czech Republic	OG	4th	6	3	2	5	0
2018	Czech Republic	WC	7th	8	4	0	4	6
2019	Czech Republic	WC	4th	10	4	3	7	2
2022	Czech Republic	OG	9th	4	0	0	0	0
Junior totals				11	2	0	2	4
Senior totals				44	16	9	25	28

== Awards ==
- Won the President's Cup (WHL champions) with the Vancouver Giants in 2006.
- WHL playoff leading scorer in 2007.
- Won the Memorial Cup (CHL champions) with the Vancouver Giants in 2007.
- Won the Ed Chynoweth Trophy (Memorial Cup leading scorer) in 2007.
- Named to the Memorial Cup All-Star Team in 2007.
- Named to the AHL All-Star Game in 2011.

Awards and achievements
Preceded by Gilbert Brulé	Ed Chynoweth Trophy; 2007	Succeeded by Justin Azevedo
