= Andrej Nestrašil =

Czech ice hockey player (born 1991)

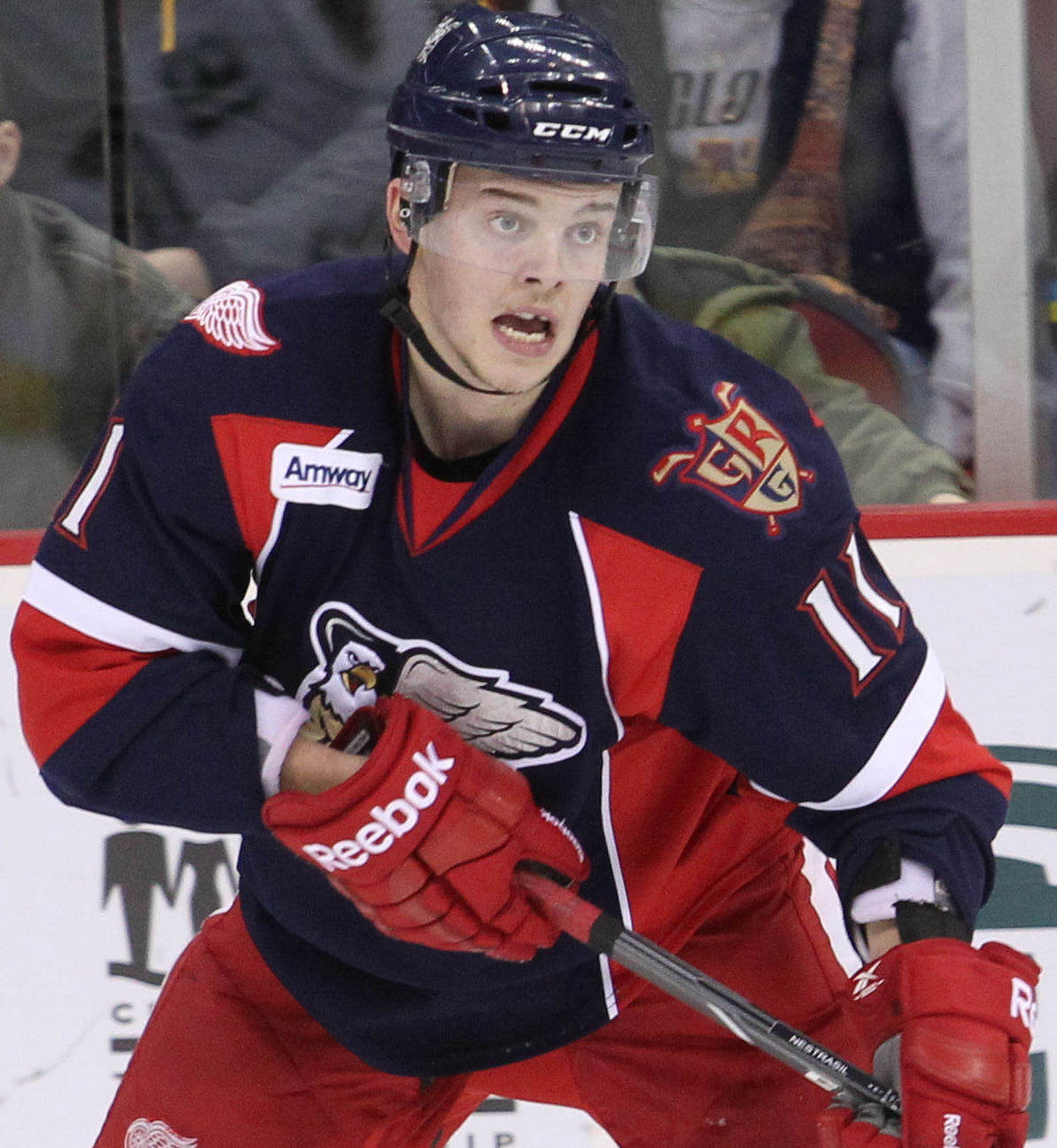
- Nestrašil with the Grand Rapids Griffins in 2013
- Born: 22 February 1991 (age 35) Prague, Czechoslovakia
- Height: 6 ft 3 in (191 cm)
- Weight: 209 lb (95 kg; 14 st 13 lb)
- Position: Right wing
- Shoots: Left
- ELH team Former teams: HC Oceláři Třinec; Detroit Red Wings; Carolina Hurricanes; Neftekhimik Nizhnekamsk; Metallurg Magnitogorsk
- National team: Czech Republic
- NHL draft: 75th overall, 2009; Detroit Red Wings
- Playing career: 2011–present

Andrej Nestrašil (born 22 February 1991) is a Czech professional ice hockey player, who is currently playing under contract to HC Oceláři Třinec in the Czech Extraliga (ELH). Nestrašil was drafted 75th overall by the Detroit Red Wings in the 2009 NHL entry draft.

== Playing career ==
=== Junior ===
Nestrašil was drafted by Victoriaville 8th overall in the 2008 CHL Import Draft. During the 2008–09 QMJHL season, he skated for the QMJHL's Tigres in his first season in North America. Nestrašil was the second-leading scorer for the Tigres with 22 goals and 35 assists in 66 games. Victoriaville reached the playoffs after finishing third in the Central Division. Nestrašil recorded two goals and one assist in the four-game series with Shawinigan.

During the 2009–10 QMJHL season, Nestrašil got off to a fast start for Victoriaville in his second season but his production slipped in the latter part of the season. Due to both a nagging injury late in January and the addition of five new forwards acquired by the Tigres in mid-season trades, he was limited late in the year; when the Tigres made a run to the QMJHL semifinals. Nestrašil had 43 points in the Tigres' first 44 games and finished with 16 goals and 35 assists in 50 regular season games. In 16 playoff games, he recorded two goals and four assists.

During the 2010–11 QMJHL season, Nestrašil was acquired by Prince Edward Island in an off-season trade. He was the second-leading scorer for the Rocket. He recorded 19 goals and 51 assists, despite missing eight games in his third QMJHL season. Prince Edward Island reached the playoffs after finishing fourth in the Maritimes Division. He scored one goal and five assists in the six-game playoff series with Shawinigan.

=== Professional ===
On 31 May 2011, the Detroit Red Wings signed Nestrašil to a three-year entry-level contract.

Nestrašil split his first pro season between the Red Wings' AHL and ECHL affiliates in Grand Rapids and Toledo. He started the 2011–12 season with Toledo, was re-called by the Griffins, and after playing 11 games, was sent back to Toledo; before returning to Grand Rapids in late March. He recorded three goals and one assist in 25 games for the Griffins. In 51 ECHL games with the Walleye, he recorded seven goals and 22 assists.

During the 2012–13 season, Nestrašil appeared in 25 regular season games and one playoff contest for Detroit's AHL affiliate Grand Rapids in his second pro season, spending most of the year with the ECHL's Toledo Walleye. He appeared in three December games and three January games, before joining Grand Rapids for an extended stay in the middle of February. He scored three goals and three assists during the regular season. The Griffins finished first in the Midwest Division and captured the Calder Cup championship. He made his only playoff appearance in Game 3 of the Western Conference finals. He was a point-per-game scorer with Toledo. He scored 11 goals and 30 assists in 40 regular season games and had one goal and two assists, in four ECHL playoff games.

During the 2013–14 season, in Nestrašil's first full season with the Griffins, he recorded 16 goals and 20 assists in 70 games.

On 17 July 2014, the Detroit Red Wings signed Nestrašil to a one-year contract.

On 9 October 2014, Nestrašil made his NHL debut for the Detroit Red Wings in a game against the Boston Bruins. On 20 November 2014, he was placed on waivers by the Detroit Red Wings and claimed by the Carolina Hurricanes. He made his Hurricanes debut on 22 November 2014 scoring his first NHL goal against Reto Berra of the Colorado Avalanche. On 8 January 2015, Nestrašil was assigned to the Charlotte Checkers on a conditioning assignment.

On 29 June 2015, the Carolina Hurricanes re-signed Nestrašil to a two-year contract.

In the final year of his contract during the 2016–17 season, the Hurricanes placed Nestrašil on waivers on 9 January 2017 and assigned him to Charlotte the next day. At the conclusion of the season, Nestrašil was not retained by the Hurricanes as a restricted free agent, releasing him to free agency on 26 June 2017.

== International play ==
Nestrašil represented the Czech Republic at the 2009 IIHF World U18 Championships. In six games for the sixth-place Czech Republic squad at the U18 WJC, He scored two goals and two assists. He represented the Czech Republic at the 2010 World Junior Ice Hockey Championships. In six games he scored one goal and six assists. The Czech Republic missed the quarterfinals, finishing in seventh-place.

Nestrašil would next represent the Czech Republic at the 2011 World Junior Ice Hockey Championships. In six games he scored one goal and two assists, for a Czech Republic squad that finished seventh for the second straight year at the WJC.

== Personal life ==
Nestrašil's younger brothers Viktor and Václav are both ice hockey players. Václav was drafted 25th overall by the Chicago Blackhawks in the 2025 NHL entry draft.

== Career statistics ==
=== Regular season and playoffs ===
			Regular season					Playoffs
Season	Team	League	GP	G	A	Pts	PIM	GP	G	A	Pts	PIM
2008–09	Victoriaville Tigres	QMJHL	66	22	35	57	67	4	2	1	3	10
2009–10	Victoriaville Tigres	QMJHL	50	16	35	51	40	16	2	4	6	10
2010–11	P.E.I. Rocket	QMJHL	58	19	51	70	40	5	1	5	6	2
2011–12	Toledo Walleye	ECHL	51	7	22	29	20	—	—	—	—	—
2011–12	Grand Rapids Griffins	AHL	25	3	1	4	8	—	—	—	—	—
2012–13	Toledo Walleye	ECHL	40	11	30	41	26	—	—	—	—	—
2012–13	Grand Rapids Griffins	AHL	25	3	3	6	2	1	0	0	0	0
2013–14	Grand Rapids Griffins	AHL	70	16	20	36	24	10	4	2	6	2
2014–15	Detroit Red Wings	NHL	13	0	2	2	4	—	—	—	—	—
2014–15	Carolina Hurricanes	NHL	41	7	11	18	4	—	—	—	—	—
2014–15	Charlotte Checkers	AHL	3	0	0	0	17	—	—	—	—	—
2015–16	Carolina Hurricanes	NHL	55	9	14	23	8	—	—	—	—	—
2016–17	Carolina Hurricanes	NHL	19	1	4	5	2	—	—	—	—	—
2016–17	Charlotte Checkers	AHL	39	5	9	14	6	5	0	1	1	0
2017–18	Neftekhimik Nizhnekamsk	KHL	49	10	20	30	39	5	1	2	3	12
2018–19	Neftekhimik Nizhnekamsk	KHL	55	8	15	23	18	—	—	—	—	—
2019–20	HC Oceláři Třinec	ELH	2	1	3	4	0	—	—	—	—	—
2019–20	Metallurg Magnitogorsk	KHL	48	13	11	24	22	5	2	0	2	2
2020–21	Metallurg Magnitogorsk	KHL	54	11	12	23	34	12	2	2	4	12
2021–22	HC Oceláři Třinec	ELH	53	16	19	35	8	14	5	6	11	0
2022–23	HC Oceláři Třinec	ELH	44	10	36	46	10	22	6	10	16	11
2023–24	HC Oceláři Třinec	ELH	51	17	32	49	46	20	3	6	9	4
2024–25	HC Oceláři Třinec	ELH	47	7	21	28	8	9	1	7	8	4
NHL totals			128	17	31	48	18	—	—	—	—	—
KHL totals			206	42	58	100	113	22	5	4	9	26
ELH totals			197	51	111	162	72	65	15	29	44	19

=== International ===
Year	Team	Event	GP	G	A	Pts	PIM
2009	Czech Republic	U18	6	2	2	4	6
2010	Czech Republic	WJC	6	1	6	7	4
2011	Czech Republic	WJC	6	1	2	3	2
2018	Czech Republic	WC	5	0	3	3	2
Junior totals			18	4	10	14	12
Senior totals			5	0	3	3	2
