= HC Oceláři Třinec =

- City: Třinec, Czech Republic
- League: Czech Extraliga
- Founded: 1929
- Home arena: Werk Arena (capacity: 5,400)
- Colours: Red, white
- President: Ján Moder
- Head coach: (Slovakia) Boris Žabka
- Captain: (Czech Republic) Martin Růžička
- Website: hcocelari.cz

HC Oceláři Třinec (Třinec Steelers) is a Czech ice hockey team from Třinec who plays in the Czech Extraliga, the top tier of Czech ice hockey. Their home arena is the Werk Arena. The team's main sponsors are the local Třinec Iron and Steel Works

The team has won the Czech Extraliga six times, most recently in the 2023–24 season. The last five title wins came in consecutive years, winning 16 straight playoff series in the process.

== Honours ==
=== Domestic ===
Czech Extraliga

- (gold) Winners (6): 2010–11, 2018–19, 2020–21, 2021–22, 2022–23, 2023–24
- (silver) Runners-up (4): 1993–94, 2014–15, 2017–18, 2025–26
- (bronze) 3rd place (1): 1998–99

Czech 1. Liga

- (silver) Runners-up (1): 1994–95

1st. Czech National Hockey League

- (bronze) 3rd place (1): 1991–92

=== Pre-season ===
Spengler Cup

- (silver) Runners-up (1): 2019

Tatra Cup

- (gold) Winners (1): 2010

Steel Cup

- (gold) Winners (1): 2014

Rona Cup

- (gold) Winners (4): 1999, 2000, 2004, 2017

== Players ==
=== Current roster ===
As of 15 February 2025.

No.	Nat	Player	Pos	S/G	Age	Acquired	Birthplace
55	(Czech Republic)	Marian Adámek	D	R	28	2017	Český Těšín, Czech Republic
26	(France)	Justin Addamo	RW	L	28	2024	Clermont-Ferrand, France
81	(Czech Republic)	David Cienciala	LW	L	30	2023	Třinec, Czech Republic
48	(Slovakia)	Viliam Čacho	C	L	27	2023	Trenčín, Slovakia
56	(Slovakia)	Marko Daňo	LW	L	31	2021	Eisenstadt, Austria
22	(Slovakia)	Vladimír Dravecký (A)	LW	L	41	2014	Košice, Czechoslovakia
19	(Slovakia)	Patrik Hrehorčák	LW	L	27	2019	Poprad, Slovakia
79	(Slovakia)	Libor Hudáček	RW	R	35	2022	Levoča, Czechoslovakia
63	(Czech Republic)	Martin Jandus	D	R	28	2024	Prague, Czech Republic
73	(Czech Republic)	Bohumil Jank	D	L	33	2024	Písek, Czechoslovakia
5	(Czech Republic)	Jakub Jeřábek	D	L	35	2022	Plzeň, Czechoslovakia
90	(Czech Republic)	Ondřej Kacetl	G	L	35	2021	Znojmo, Czechoslovakia
34	(Czech Republic)	Ondřej Kovařčík	LW	L	31	2024	Nový Jičín, Czech Republic
84	(Czech Republic)	Tomáš Kundrátek	D	R	36	2023	Přerov, Czechoslovakia
42	(Czech Republic)	Daniel Kurovský	LW	R	28	2020	Havířov, Czech Republic
52	(Slovakia)	Martin Marinčin (A)	D	L	34	2021	Košice, Czechoslovakia
2	(Czech Republic)	Marek Mazanec	G	R	34	2021	Písek, Czechoslovakia
75	(Czech Republic)	Richard Nedomlel	D	L	32	2023	Prague, Czech Republic
94	(Czech Republic)	Andrej Nestrašil (A)	RW	L	35	2021	Prague, Czechoslovakia
40	(Slovakia)	Miloš Roman	C	L	26	2020	Kysucké Nové Mesto, Slovakia
27	(Czech Republic)	Martin Růžička (C)	RW	R	40	2016	Beroun, Czechoslovakia
3	(Czech Republic)	Petr Sikora	C	L	20	2023	Karviná, Czech Republic
92	(Czech Republic)	Michal Teplý	LW	R	25	2024	Havlíčkův Brod, Czech Republic
20	(Czech Republic)	Petr Vrána	C	L	41	2018	Šternberk, Czechoslovakia

== See also ==
- Třinec Iron and Steel Works

Preceded by HC Eaton Pardubice	Czech Extraliga; Champions; 2010–11	Succeeded by HC ČSOB Pojišťovna Pardubice
Preceded by HC Kometa Brno	Czech Extraliga; Champions; 2018–19	Succeeded by No competition (Note: No playoffs due to the COVID-19 pandemic in Czech Republic.)
Preceded by No competition (Note: No playoffs due to the COVID-19 pandemic in Czech Republic.)	Czech Extraliga; Champions; 2020–21	Succeeded by Incumbent
