= Vladimír Sobotka =

Czech ice hockey player (born 1987)

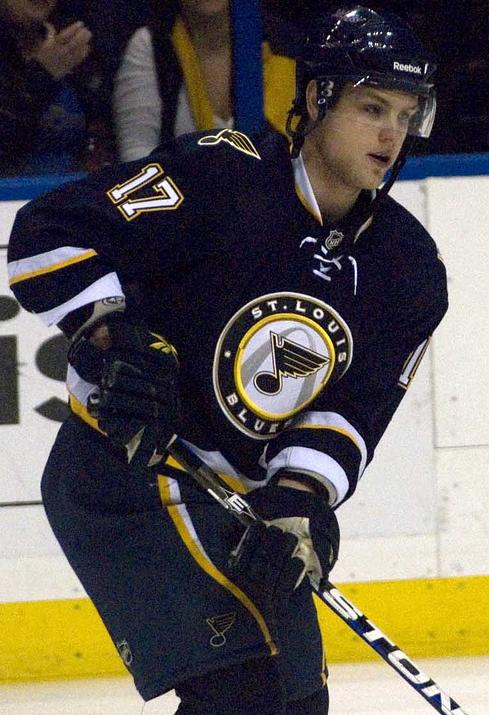
- Sobotka with the St. Louis Blues in February 2011
- Born: 2 July 1987 (age 39) Třebíč, Czechoslovakia
- Height: 5 ft 10 in (178 cm)
- Weight: 183 lb (83 kg; 13 st 1 lb)
- Position: Center
- Shoots: Left
- ELH team Former teams: HC Dynamo Pardubice; Slavia Prague; Boston Bruins; St. Louis Blues; Avangard Omsk; Buffalo Sabres; SC Rapperswil-Jona Lakers; HC Sparta Praha
- National team: Czech Republic
- NHL draft: 106th overall, 2005; Boston Bruins
- Playing career: 2004–present

Vladimír Sobotka (Czech pronunciation: [ˈvlaɟɪmiːr ˈsobotka]; born 2 July 1987) is a Czech professional ice hockey centre currently playing for Sparta Praha of the Czech Extraliga (ELH). Sobotka has previously played in the National Hockey League (NHL) for the Boston Bruins, St. Louis Blues and the Buffalo Sabres, and also in the Kontinental Hockey League (KHL) for Avangard Omsk. Sobotka was selected in the fourth round, 106th overall, in 2005 by the Boston Bruins from Slavia Prague.

== Playing career ==
Sobotka played his first NHL game during the 2007–08 season on 24 November 2007 against the New York Islanders. His first career NHL goal was scored later that season, on 13 February 2008, against Ty Conklin of the Pittsburgh Penguins.

On 26 June 2010, the Boston Bruins traded Sobotka to the St. Louis Blues in exchange for the rights to prospect David Warsofsky.

On 6 November 2010, Sobotka recorded his first goal for the Blues against his former club, the Boston Bruins, beating Tuukka Rask after a turnover in the Bruins zone. On 30 November, Sobotka recorded his first career three-point game having recorded three assists on goals by Alex Pietrangelo, Eric Brewer and Patrik Berglund in a 7–5 loss to the Chicago Blackhawks. At the end of the 2010–11 season, he finished with 29 points in 65 games.

On 15 June 2011, Sobotka signed a three-year contract extension with the Blues.

On 9 March 2013, Sobotka scored his first career NHL hat-trick against the San Jose Sharks.

Sobotka, at the completion of the 2013–14 season, became a restricted free agent, and instead of re-signing with the Blues, opted instead to sign with Avangard Omsk in the KHL on a three-year contract. When it became clear to the Blues that there was a possibility that Sobotka would be playing in the KHL, the organization filed for salary arbitration with the NHL. On 21 July 2014, Sobotka received a one-year, $2.725 million award from an arbitrator. The result of the arbitration award states that should Sobotka return to the NHL in the future, the Blues would retain his rights for one year at the amount awarded by the arbitrator; at the end of that year, he would then become an unrestricted free agent in the NHL.

After completing three full seasons in the KHL, it was announced on April 6, 2017, that Sobotka would return to the Blues in time for the end of the 2016–17 season and then the playoffs. He finished the 2016–17 season on the salary awarded to him in arbitration in 2014 ($2.725 million) and agreed to a three-year extension with the Blues, set to kick in for the 2017–18 NHL season.

On July 1, 2018, Sobotka, along with Tage Thompson, Patrik Berglund, a first-round pick in the 2019 NHL entry draft and a second-round pick in the 2021 NHL entry draft, was traded to the Buffalo Sabres in exchange for Ryan O'Reilly.

At the completion of his contract with the Sabres, Sobotka left the NHL as a free agent and agreed to an initial one-month contract in Switzerland with SC Rapperswil-Jona Lakers of the NL on 9 October 2020.

== International play ==
On 6 January 2014, Sobotka was named to the Czech Republic's roster for the 2014 Winter Olympics in Sochi, though a leg injury sustained with St. Louis on 31 January prevented him from participating.

== Career statistics ==
=== Regular season and playoffs ===
			Regular season					Playoffs
Season	Team	League	GP	G	A	Pts	PIM	GP	G	A	Pts	PIM
2003–04	HC Slavia Praha	CZE U18	35	24	41	65	109	7	7	12	19	8
2003–04	HC Slavia Praha	CZE U20	18	6	6	12	16	—	—	—	—	—
2003–04	HC Slavia Praha	ELH	1	0	0	0	0	—	—	—	—	—
2004–05	HC Slavia Praha	CZE U20	27	12	21	33	91	—	—	—	—	—
2004–05	HC Slavia Praha	ELH	18	0	1	1	8	—	—	—	—	—
2004–05	HC Rebel Havlíčkův Brod	CZE.3	7	3	0	3	31	7	1	5	6	0
2005–06	HC Slavia Praha	CZE U20	8	10	4	14	42	—	—	—	—	—
2005–06	HC Slavia Praha	ELH	33	1	9	10	28	11	2	3	5	10
2006–07	HC Slavia Praha	ELH	33	7	6	13	38	—	—	—	—	—
2007–08	Providence Bruins	AHL	18	10	10	20	37	6	0	4	4	0
2007–08	Boston Bruins	NHL	48	1	6	7	24	6	2	0	2	0
2008–09	Providence Bruins	AHL	44	20	24	44	83	14	2	11	13	43
2008–09	Boston Bruins	NHL	25	1	4	5	10	—	—	—	—	—
2009–10	Providence Bruins	AHL	6	4	6	10	4	—	—	—	—	—
2009–10	Boston Bruins	NHL	61	4	6	10	30	13	0	2	2	15
2010–11	St. Louis Blues	NHL	65	7	22	29	69	—	—	—	—	—
2011–12	St. Louis Blues	NHL	73	5	15	20	42	9	1	1	2	15
2012–13	HC Slavia Praha	ELH	27	10	15	25	22	—	—	—	—	—
2012–13	St. Louis Blues	NHL	48	8	11	19	35	6	0	3	3	0
2013–14	St. Louis Blues	NHL	61	9	24	33	72	6	0	3	3	4
2014–15	Avangard Omsk	KHL	53	10	28	38	51	4	1	1	2	0
2015–16	Avangard Omsk	KHL	44	18	16	34	22	2	0	2	2	0
2016–17	Avangard Omsk	KHL	41	9	21	30	30	12	3	7	10	16
2016–17	St. Louis Blues	NHL	1	1	0	1	0	11	2	4	6	2
2017–18	St. Louis Blues	NHL	81	11	20	31	50	—	—	—	—	—
2018–19	Buffalo Sabres	NHL	69	5	8	13	26	—	—	—	—	—
2019–20	Buffalo Sabres	NHL	16	1	2	3	4	—	—	—	—	—
2020–21	SC Rapperswil–Jona Lakers	NL	4	0	2	2	6	—	—	—	—	—
2020–21	HC Sparta Praha	ELH	36	7	24	31	26	11	2	4	6	4
2021–22	HC Sparta Praha	ELH	40	12	24	36	29	15	4	4	8	8
2022–23	HC Sparta Praha	ELH	45	13	22	35	16	6	2	2	4	2
2023–24	HC Sparta Praha	ELH	41	12	15	27	18	7	0	0	0	2
ELH totals			274	62	116	178	171	50	10	13	23	26
NHL totals			548	53	118	171	362	51	5	13	18	36
KHL totals			138	37	65	102	103	18	4	10	14	16

=== International ===
Medal record

Representing Czech Republic

World U18 Championships
Bronze medal – third place	2004 Minsk	

Year	Team	Event	Result	GP	G	A	Pts	PIM
2004	Czech Republic	WJC18	3rd place, bronze medalist(s)	7	1	0	1	10
2005	Czech Republic	WJC18	4th	7	1	0	1	10
2006	Czech Republic	WJC	6th	6	2	2	4	33
2007	Czech Republic	WJC	5th	6	4	4	8	12
2014	Czech Republic	WC	4th	9	2	4	6	10
2015	Czech Republic	WC	4th	10	4	0	4	4
2016	Czech Republic	WCH	6th	3	0	1	1	0
2022	Czech Republic	OG	9th	4	0	1	1	9
2023	Czech Republic	WC	8th	8	0	2	2	2
Junior totals				26	8	6	14	65
Senior totals				34	6	8	14	22
