= Erik Hrňa =

Czech ice hockey player

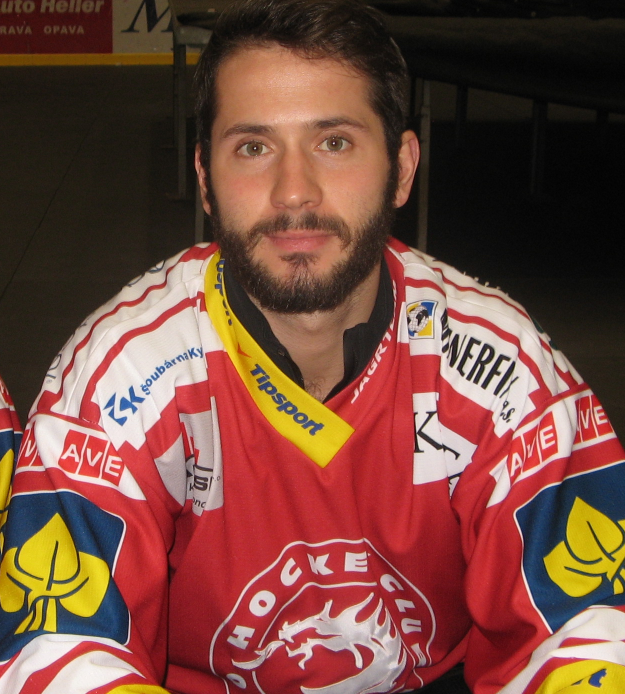
- Erik Hrňa after the end of the 2014/15 season in the Werk Arena
- Born: 25 June 1988 (age 36); Vsetín, Czechoslovakia
- Height: 5 ft 10 in (178 cm)
- Weight: 170 lb (77 kg; 12 st 2 lb)
- Position: Forward
- Shoots: Left
- Czech team: HC Oceláři Třinec
- National team: Czech Republic
- Playing career: 2006–present

Erik Hrňa (born 25 June 1988) is a Czech professional ice hockey player. He played with HC Oceláři Třinec in the Czech Extraliga during the 2010–11 Czech Extraliga season.
