= Nicolas Hlava =

Czech ice hockey player

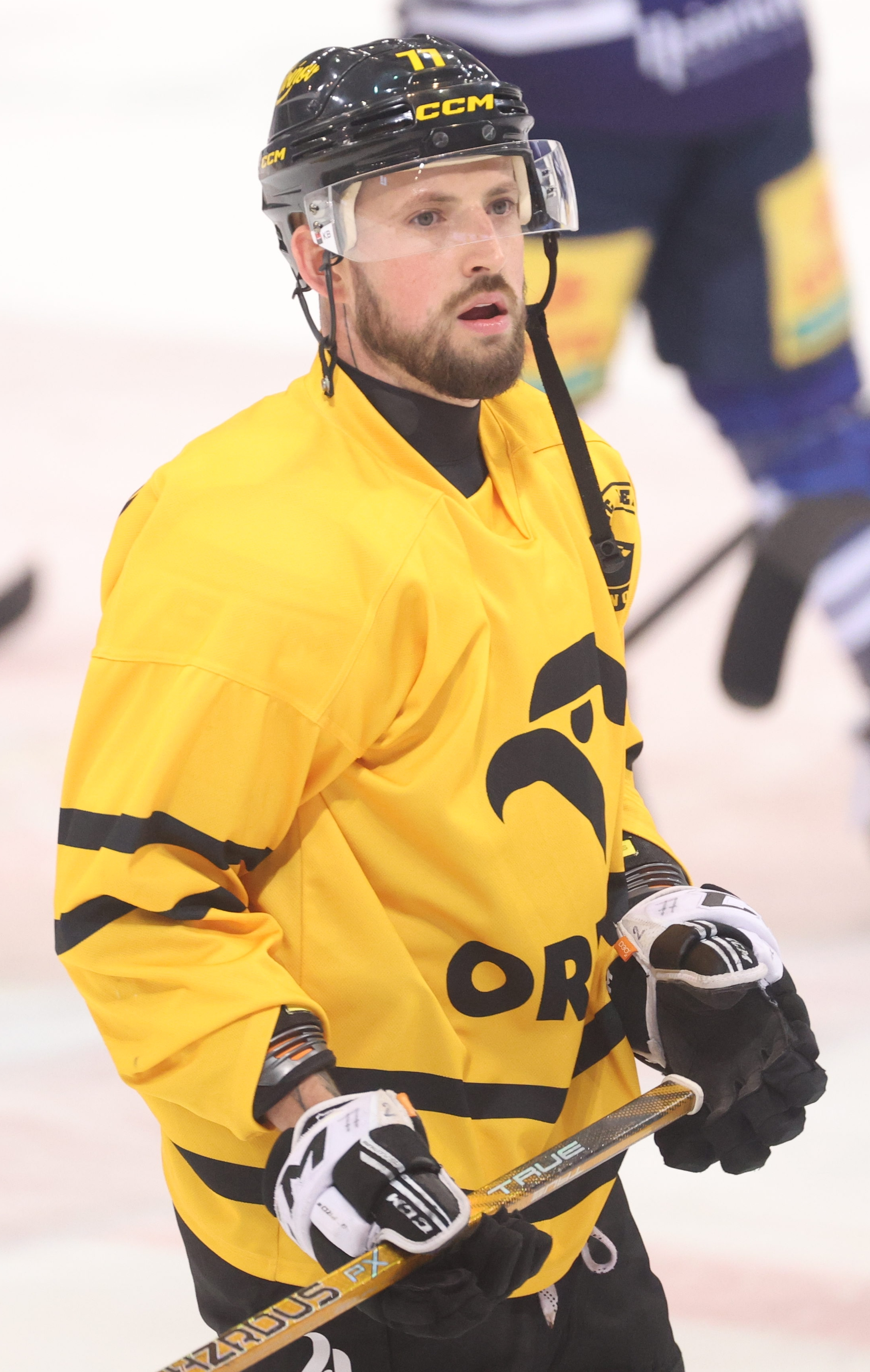
- Nicolas Hlava, 2024
- Born: May 17, 1994 (age 30); Czech Republic
- Height: 6 ft 0 in (183 cm)
- Weight: 181 lb (82 kg; 12 st 13 lb)
- Position: Forward
- Shoots: Left
- ELH team Former teams: HC Litvínov; Piráti Chomutov; Orli Znojmo; HC Energie Karlovy Vary; Rytíři Kladno
- Playing career: 2013–present

Nicolas Hlava (born May 17, 1994) is a Czech professional ice hockey player. He currently plays with HC Litvínov in the Czech Extraliga (ELH).

Hlava made his Czech Extraliga debut playing with Piráti Chomutov debut during the 2013–14 Czech Extraliga season.
