= Tomáš Harkabus =

Czech ice hockey player

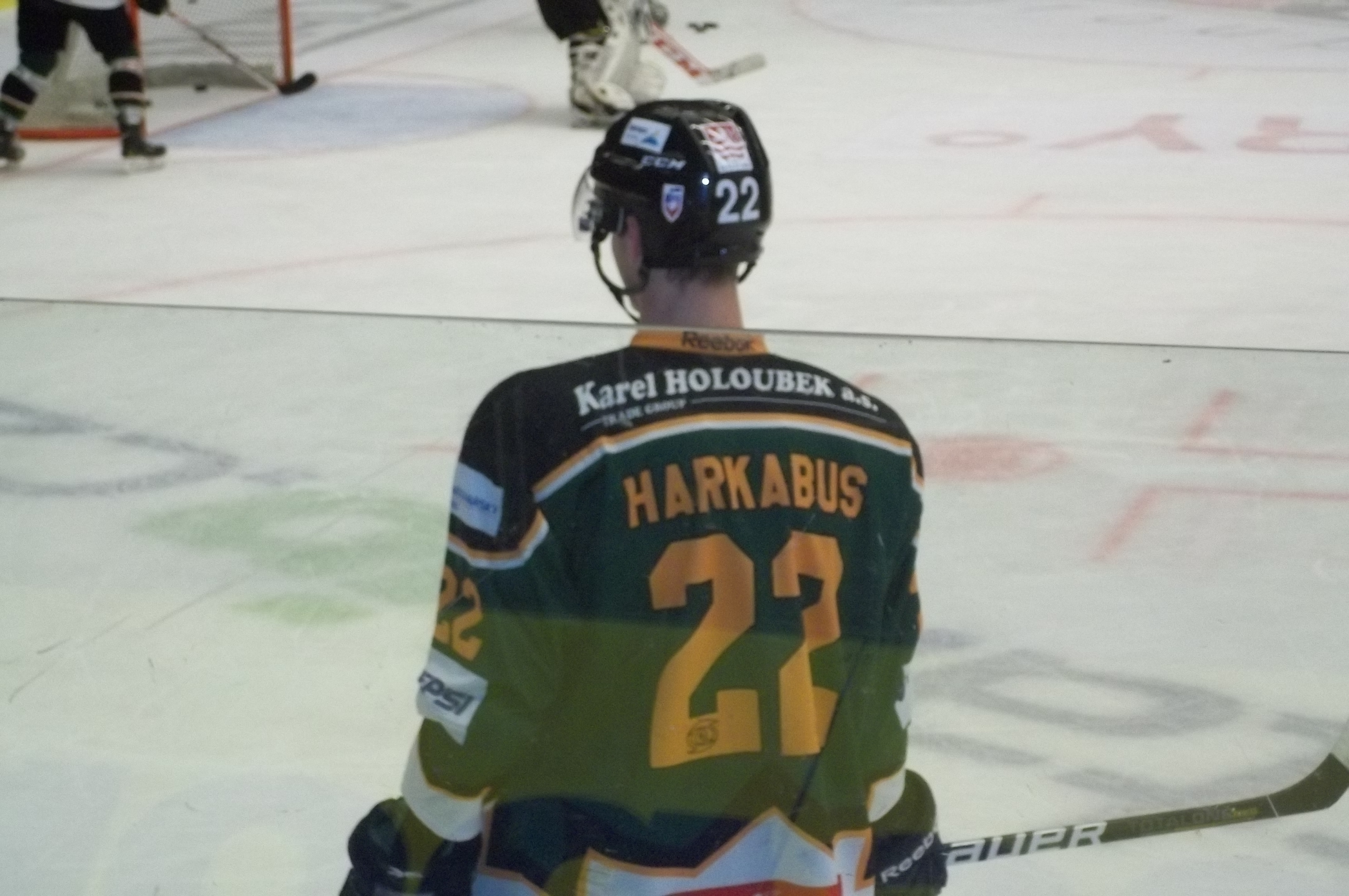
- Born: March 16, 1994 (age 32) Ústí nad Labem, Czech Republic
- Height: 6 ft 2 in (188 cm)
- Weight: 203 lb (92 kg; 14 st 7 lb)
- Position: Forward
- Shoots: Right
- Chance Liga team Former teams: HC Dukla Jihlava; HC Karlovy Vary
- Playing career: 2014–present

Tomáš Harkabus (born March 16, 1994) is a Czech professional ice hockey forward playing for HC Dukla Jihlava of the Chance Liga.

Harkabus previously played 47 games in the Czech Extraliga for HC Karlovy Vary. He also played on loan with SK Kadaň, HC Frýdek-Místek and HC Baník Sokolov as well as three loan spells with Dukla Jihlava before joining the team permanently on May 22, 2018.
