= Boris Žabka =

Slovak ice hockey player and coach

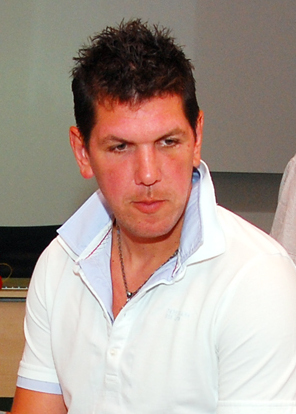
- Born: October 11, 1977 (age 48) Bratislava, Czechoslovakia
- Height: 6 ft 1 in (185 cm)
- Weight: 205 lb (93 kg; 14 st 9 lb)
- Position: Defence
- Shot: Left
- Czech Extraliga team: BK Mladá Boleslav
- Playing career: 1995–2015

Boris Žabka (born October 11, 1977) is a Slovak ice hockey coach. As a player he was a defenceman. He played with BK Mladá Boleslav in the Czech Extraliga from 2010 to 2015.

In 2012 he started his coaching career as the assistant coach in BK Mladá Boleslav youth teams and during the season 2016–2017 he was promoted as a new assistant coach of the men's team. During the season 2018–2019 he was recalled from his post as the assistant coach of the men's team of BK Mladá Boleslav.
