= David Němeček =

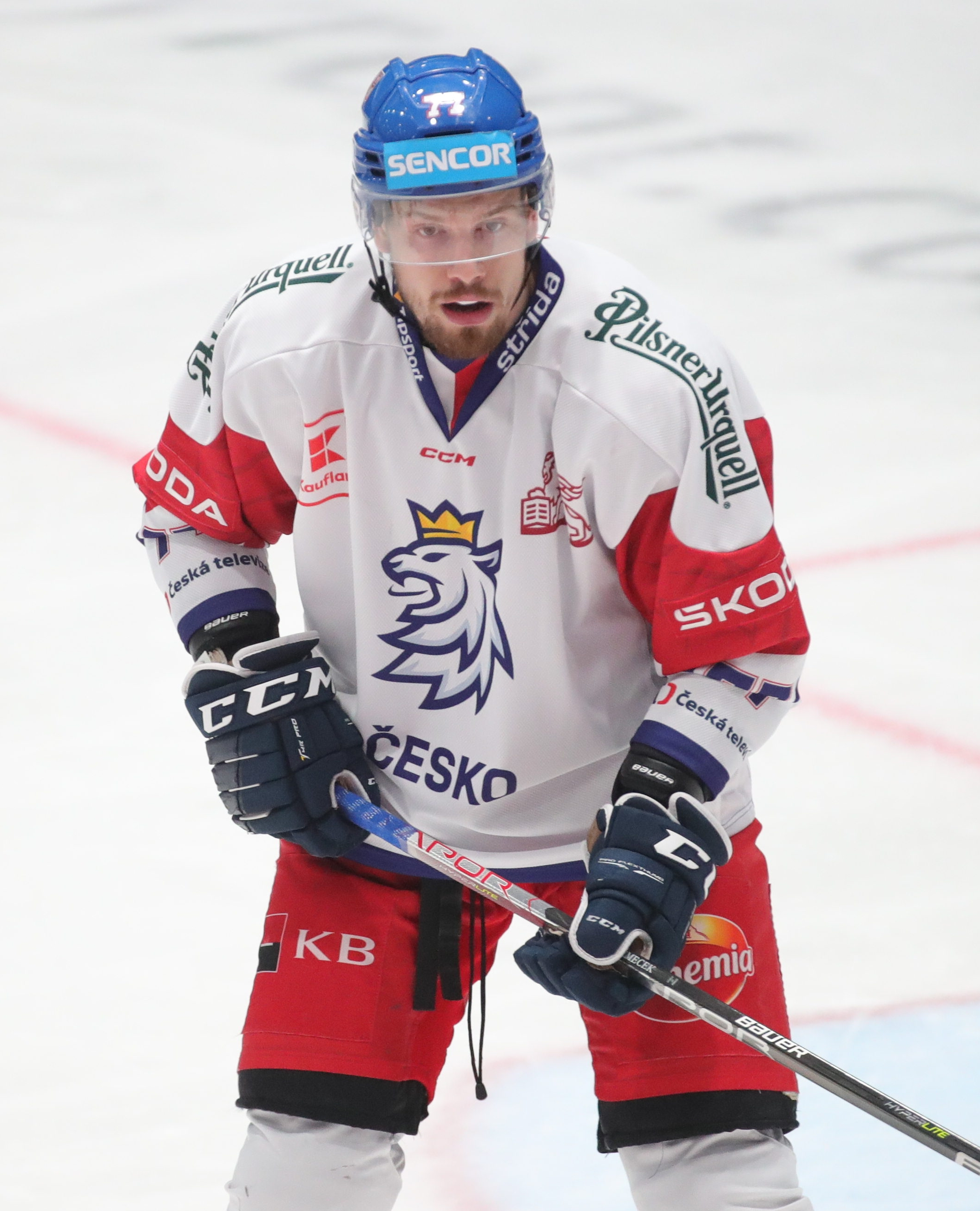
- Němeček with the Czech Republic (2023)
- Born: June 29, 1995 (age 30) Plzeň, Czech Republic
- Height: 6 ft 4 in (193 cm)
- Weight: 209 lb (95 kg; 14 st 13 lb)
- Position: Defense
- Shoots: Left
- ELH team Former teams: HC Sparta Praha; HC TPS; HC Plzeň; BK Mladá Boleslav; Lukko
- National team: Czech Republic
- NHL draft: Undrafted
- Playing career: 2014–present

David Němeček (born 29 June 1995) is a Czech professional ice hockey player who plays for HC Sparta Praha in Czech Extraliga (ELH).

== Playing career ==
In 2020 in a game against Ässät David Němeček got a 7-game ban from Liiga after his shoulder hit Otto Kivenmäki in the head. Kivenmäki's helmet came off and he hit his head in the ice causing mild brain damage (has already healed).

== Career statistics ==
=== International ===
Year	Team	Event	Result	GP	G	A	Pts	PIM
2012	Czech Republic	U17	8th	5	0	1	1	14
2013	Czech Republic	U18	7th	5	0	0	0	4
2014	Czech Republic	WJC	6th	5	0	0	0	2
2015	Czech Republic	WJC	6th	5	0	1	1	16
2023	Czech Republic	WC	8th	8	1	0	1	2
Junior totals				20	0	2	2	36
Senior totals				8	1	0	1	2
