= Vladimír Dravecký =

Slovak ice hockey player (born 1985)

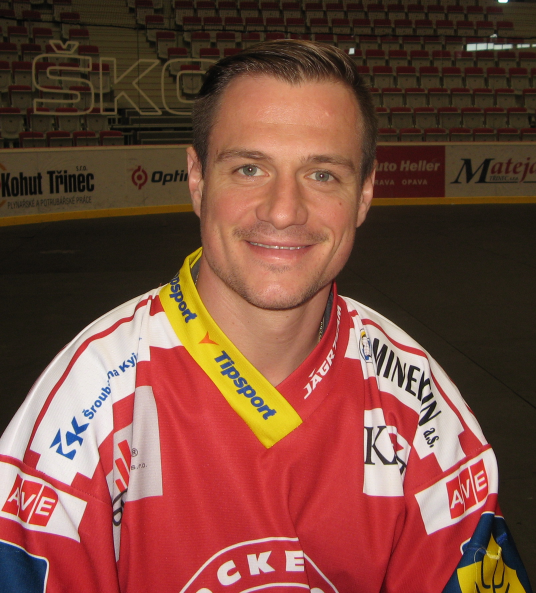
- Born: 3 June 1985 (age 41) Košice, Czechoslovakia
- Height: 6 ft 0 in (183 cm)
- Weight: 198 lb (90 kg; 14 st 2 lb)
- Position: Right wing
- Shoots: Left
- ELH team Former teams: Oceláři Třinec; Košice; Yugra; Slovan Bratislava; Espoo Blues
- National team: Slovakia
- NHL draft: Undrafted
- Playing career: 2001–present

Vladimír Dravecký (born 3 June 1985) is a Slovak professional ice hockey player who is a right winger for Oceláři Třinec of the Czech Extraliga (ELH).

== Career ==
Dravecký is a product of the Košice youth system. He debuted in the Slovak Extraliga in the 2001–02 season. His breakthrough came in the 2003–04 season where he played 43 games in the regular season. On 21 May 2007, he signed a two-year contract with the Los Angeles Kings. Dravecký then played with Kings' American Hockey League (AHL) affiliate, the Manchester Monarchs, for the next two seasons before his return to Europe in 2009. In 2012, he signed to play in Kontinental Hockey League (KHL) with Slovan Bratislava.

== International play ==
Dravecký participated in the 2010 World Championship, playing six games for Slovakia without point.

== Personal life ==
Dravecký's son, also named Vladimír was selected by the New York Islanders in the 2026 NHL entry draft.
