= Marek Baránek =

Czech ice hockey player

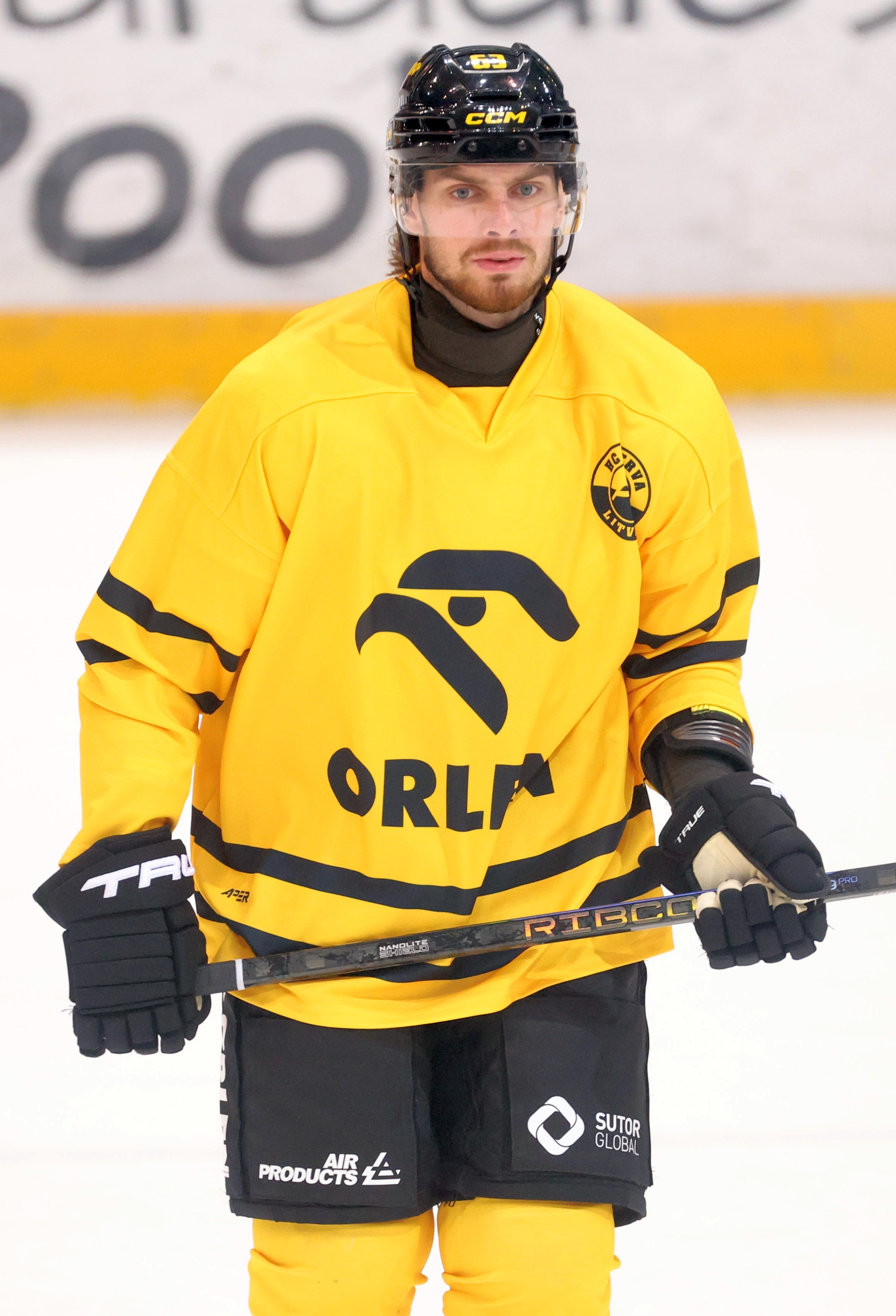
- Marek Baránek, 2024
- Born: March 1, 1995 (age 31) Ústí nad Labem, Czech Republic
- Height: 6 ft 1 in (185 cm)
- Weight: 181 lb (82 kg; 12 st 13 lb)
- Position: Defenseman
- Shoots: Left
- ELH team Former teams: HC Litvínov; HC Karlovy Vary; HC Dukla Jihlava; SK Trhači Kadaň; HC Košice; Rytíři Kladno; HC Plzeň
- Playing career: 2014–present

Marek Baránek (born March 1, 1995) is a Czech professional ice hockey player. He is currently playing for HC Litvínov in the Czech Extraliga (ELH).

Baránek made his Czech Extraliga debut playing with HC Litvínov during the 2014–15 Czech Extraliga season.

== Career statistics ==
=== Regular season and playoffs ===
			Regular season					Playoffs
Season	Team	League	GP	G	A	Pts	PIM	GP	G	A	Pts	PIM

=== International ===
Year	Team	Event	Result	GP	G	A	Pts	PIM
