= Patrik Hrehorčák =

Slovak ice hockey left winger

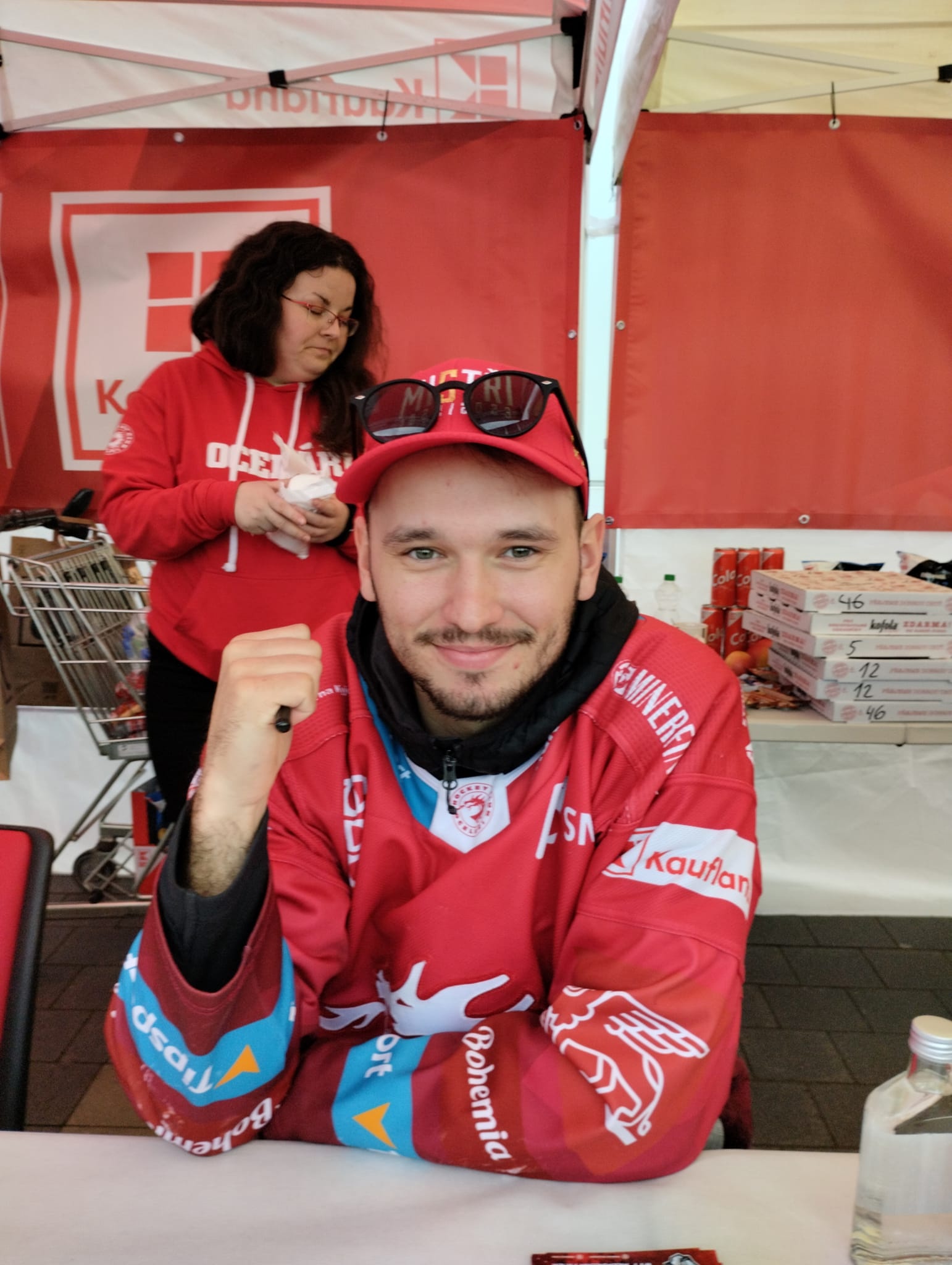
- Born: March 18, 1999 (age 26); Poprad, Slovakia
- Height: 5 ft 10 in (178 cm)
- Weight: 174 lb (79 kg; 12 st 6 lb)
- Position: Left wing
- Shoots: Left
- ELH team: HC Oceláři Třinec
- National team: Slovakia
- Playing career: 2019–present

Patrik Hrehorčák (born March 18, 1999) is a Slovak professional ice hockey defenceman playing for HC Oceláři Třinec of the Czech Extraliga (ELH).

== Career ==
Hrehorčák previously played two seasons in the Quebec Major Junior Hockey League for the Rouyn-Noranda Huskies, where he won the President's Cup and the Memorial Cup in 2019. He signed with Oceláři Třinec on June 20, 2019, and made his debut for the team on September 13, 2019.
