= Matěj Beran =

Czech ice hockey player

- Born: November 11, 1993 (age 32) Plzeň, Czech Republic
- Height: 6 ft 4 in (193 cm)
- Weight: 220 lb (100 kg; 15 st 10 lb)
- Position: Centre
- Shoots: Left
- ELH team Former teams: Rytíři Kladno; HC Plzeň; HC Dynamo Pardubice; HC Sparta Praha
- NHL draft: Undrafted
- Playing career: 2014–present

Matěj Beran (born November 11, 1993) is a Czech professional ice hockey player. He is currently playing for Rytíři Kladno of the Czech Extraliga (ELH).

Beran made his Czech Extraliga debut playing with HC Plzeň during the 2014–15 Czech Extraliga season. He wears 88 on the team and he is possibly honoring Eric Lindros.
