= HC Litvínov =

HC VERVA Litvínov
- City: Litvínov, Czech Republic
- League: Czech Extraliga
- Founded: November 8, 1945
- Home arena: Zimní stadion Ivana Hlinky (capacity 5,994)
- Colours: Black, yellow
- Head coach: (Czech Republic) Robert Reichel
- Captain: Matúš Sukeľ
- Website: hcvl.cz

HC Litvínov, called HC VERVA Litvínov for sponsorship reasons, is an ice hockey team in the Czech Extraliga. Their home arena is Ivan Hlinka Stadion in Litvínov.

== Honours ==
=== Domestic ===
Czech Extraliga

- (gold) Winners (1): 2014–15
- (silver) Runners-up (1): 1995–96

Czechoslovak Extraliga

- (silver) Runners-up (3): 1977–78, 1983–84, 1990–91
- (bronze) 3rd place (3): 1981–82, 1989–90, 1991–92

2nd. Czechoslovak Hockey League

- (gold) Winners (1): 1958–59

=== Pre-season ===
Tipsport Hockey Cup

- (gold) Winners (1): 2002

== Players ==
=== Current roster ===
As of 12 September 2024.

No.	Nat	Player	Pos	S/G	Age	Acquired	Birthplace
21	(Czech Republic)	Ondřej Baláž	D	L	23	2021	Kadaň, Czech Republic
63	(Czech Republic)	Marek Baránek	D	L	31	2023	Ústí nad Labem, Czech Republic
8	(Slovakia)	Maxim Čajkovič	RW	R	25	2024	Bratislava, Slovakia
27	(Canada)	Kevin Czuczman	D	L	35	2023	London, Ontario, Canada
13	(Slovakia)	František Gajdoš	D	L	25	2024	Bardejov, Slovakia
62	(Czech Republic)	Michal Gut	C	L	24	2022	Kadaň, Czech Republic
29	(Czech Republic)	Martin Havelka	LW	L	28	2017	Most, Czech Republic
77	(Czech Republic)	Nicolas Hlava	LW	R	32	2022	Chomutov, Czech Republic
87	(Czech Republic)	Josef Jícha	C	L	29	2024	Ústí nad Labem, Czech Republic
64	(Czech Republic)	Ondřej Jurčík	W	L	34	2021	Teplice, Czechoslovakia
25	(Czech Republic)	David Kaše (A)	W	L	29	2023	Kadaň, Czech Republic
73	(Czech Republic)	Ondřej Kaše (A)	RW	R	30	2023	Kadaň, Czech Republic
10	(Czech Republic)	Petr Koblasa	RW	R	32	2023	Soběslav, Czech Republic
74	(Czech Republic)	Matěj Maštalířský	LW	L	21	2023	Domažlice, Czech Republic
44	(Canada)	Jared McIsaac	D	L	26	2024	Truro, Nova Scotia, Canada
41	(Czech Republic)	Matěj Pekař	C	L	26	2024	Turnov, Czech Republic
3	(Czech Republic)	Adam Polášek	D	L	35	2024	Ostrava, Czechoslovakia
43	(Sweden)	Filip Sandberg	C	R	32	2024	Järfälla, Sweden
91	(Slovakia)	Matúš Sukeľ (C)	C	L	30	2021	Liptovský Mikuláš, Slovakia
30	(Slovakia)	Matej Tomek	G	L	29	2021	Bratislava, Slovakia
–	(Czech Republic)	Lukáš Vopelka	C	R		2024	České Budějovice, Czech Republic
34	(Czech Republic)	Šimon Zajíček	G	L	25	2019	Czech Republic
90	(Czech Republic)	Denis Zeman	D	R	25	2021	Chomutov, Czech Republic
7	(Latvia)	Kristaps Zīle	D	L	28	2023	Riga, Latvia
12	(Poland)	Pawel Zygmunt	RW	R	26	2019	Krynica-Zdrój, Poland

== Club names ==
- 1945 – Sportovní klub Stalinovy závody Horní Litvínov
- 1954 – Jiskra SZ Litvínov
- 1962 – CHZ (Chemické závody) LITVÍNOV
- 1990 – HC (Hockey club) CHZ Litvínov
- 1991 – HC Chemopetrol Litvínov
- 1994 – HC Litvínov, s. r. o.
- 1996 – HC Chemopetrol, a. s.
- 2007 – HC Litvínov
- 2009 – HC BENZINA Litvínov
- 2011 – HC VERVA Litvínov

== Players ==
- See Category:HC Litvínov players for a list of HC Litvínov players past and present.

Preceded by PSG Zlín	Czech Extraliga Champions; 2014–15	Succeeded by HC Bílí Tygři Liberec
