= 2020–21 Czech Extraliga season =

- League: Czech Extraliga
- Sport: Ice hockey
- Duration: September 2020 – April 2021
- Number of teams: 14

Regular Season
- Presidential Cup: Sparta Praha
- Top scorer: Peter Mueller (Kometa Brno); (64 points)

Playoffs

Finals
- Champions: HC Oceláři Třinec
- Runners-up: HC Bílí Tygři Liberec

Czech Extraliga seasons
- ← 2019–20 2021–22 →

The 2020–21 Czech Extraliga season was the 28th season of the Czech Extraliga since its creation after the breakup of Czechoslovakia and the Czechoslovak First Ice Hockey League in 1993. HC Oceláři Třinec and HC Bílí Tygři Liberec reached the finals, in a repeat of the last completed season in 2018–19. Třinec again prevailed, winning the series by 4 games to 1.

== Regular season ==
=== Standings ===
Each team played 52 games, playing each of the other thirteen teams four times. Points were awarded for each game, where three points were awarded for winning in regulation time, two points for winning in overtime or shootout, one point for losing in overtime or shootout, and zero points for losing in regulation time. At the end of the regular season, the team that finished with the most points was crowned the league champion.

| Pos | Team | Pld | W | OTW | OTL | L | GF | GA | GD | Pts | Qualification |
|---|---|---|---|---|---|---|---|---|---|---|---|
| 1 | Sparta Praha | 52 | 32 | 3 | 6 | 11 | 194 | 116 | +78 | 108 | Qualification to Quarter-finals |
| 2 | Třinec | 52 | 31 | 4 | 5 | 12 | 187 | 130 | +57 | 106 | Qualification to Quarter-finals |
| 3 | Mladá Boleslav | 52 | 26 | 6 | 7 | 13 | 167 | 126 | +41 | 97 | Qualification to Quarter-finals |
| 4 | Liberec | 52 | 24 | 8 | 5 | 15 | 152 | 118 | +34 | 93 | Qualification to Quarter-finals |
| 5 | Plzeň | 52 | 24 | 6 | 7 | 15 | 170 | 128 | +42 | 91 | Qualification to Wild card round |
| 6 | Mountfield HK | 52 | 26 | 4 | 3 | 19 | 144 | 127 | +17 | 89 | Qualification to Wild card round |
| 7 | Pardubice | 52 | 21 | 7 | 4 | 20 | 141 | 146 | −5 | 81 | Qualification to Wild card round |
| 8 | Vítkovice | 52 | 20 | 4 | 6 | 22 | 130 | 142 | −12 | 74 | Qualification to Wild card round |
| 9 | Kometa Brno | 52 | 19 | 5 | 6 | 22 | 144 | 152 | −8 | 73 | Qualification to Wild card round |
| 10 | Karlovy Vary | 52 | 17 | 8 | 6 | 21 | 145 | 176 | −31 | 73 | Qualification to Wild card round |
| 11 | Litvínov | 52 | 17 | 8 | 5 | 22 | 133 | 146 | −13 | 72 | Qualification to Wild card round |
| 12 | Olomouc | 52 | 14 | 6 | 5 | 27 | 105 | 156 | −51 | 59 | Qualification to Wild card round |
| 13 | Zlín | 52 | 11 | 3 | 4 | 34 | 108 | 178 | −70 | 43 | |
| 14 | České Budějovice | 52 | 6 | 4 | 7 | 35 | 128 | 207 | −79 | 33 | |

Source: Tipsport Extraliga
Rules for classification: 1) Points; 2) Head-to-head points.

== Playoffs ==
Twelve teams qualify for the playoffs: the top four teams in the regular season have a bye to the quarterfinals, while teams ranked fifth to twelfth meet each other (5 versus 12, 6 versus 11, 7 versus 10, 8 versus 9) in a preliminary playoff round.

=== Bracket ===
Wild-card round (best-of-5)
8 | Vítkovice | 2
9 | Kometa Brno | 3
7 | Pardubice | 3
10 | Karlovy Vary | 1
5 | Plzeň | 0
12 | Olomouc | 3
6 | Mountfield HK | 3
11 | Litvínov | 0

Quarter-finals (best-of-7)
2 | Třinec | 4
9 | Kometa Brno | 0
3 | Mladá Boleslav | 4
7 | Pardubice | 0
1 | Sparta Praha | 4
12 | Olomouc | 0
4 | Liberec | 4
6 | Mountfield HK | 0

Semi-finals (best-of-7)
2 | Třinec | 4
3 | Mladá Boleslav | 3
1 | Sparta Praha | 3
4 | Liberec | 4

Finals (best-of-7)
2 | Třinec | 4
4 | Liberec | 1

=== Wild card round ===
Plzeň – Olomouc 0-3
| 10.3.2021 | Plzeň | Olomouc | 1-2 |
| 11.3.2021 | Plzeň | Olomouc | 2-3 |
| 13.3.2021 | Olomouc | Plzeň | 2-1 |
Olomouc wins the series 3-0.

Pardubice – Karlovy Vary 3-1
| 10.3.2021 | Pardubice | Karlovy Vary | 2-1 |
| 11.3.2021 | Pardubice | Karlovy Vary | 11-3 |
| 13.3.2021 | Karlovy Vary | Pardubice | 2-1 OT1 |
| 14.3.2021 | Karlovy Vary | Pardubice | 1-5 |
Pardubice wins the series 3-1.

Mountfield HK – Litvínov 3-0
| 10.3.2021 | Mountfield HK | Litvínov | 2-0 |
| 11.3.2021 | Mountfield HK | Litvínov | 3-1 |
| 13.3.2021 | Litvínov | Mountfield HK | 1-5 |
Mountfield HK wins the series 3-0.

Vítkovice – Kometa Brno 2-3
| 10.3.2021 | Vítkovice | Kometa Brno | 2-1 OT1 |
| 11.3.2021 | Vítkovice | Kometa Brno | 2-1 |
| 13.3.2021 | Kometa Brno | Vítkovice | 2-1 OT1 |
| 14.3.2021 | Kometa Brno | Vítkovice | 2-1 OT1 |
| 16.3.2021 | Vítkovice | Kometa Brno | 1-3 |
Kometa Brno wins the series 3-2.

=== Quarterfinals ===
Sparta Praha – Olomouc 4-0
| 20.3.2021 | Sparta Praha | Olomouc | 3-1 |
| 21.3.2021 | Sparta Praha | Olomouc | 2-0 |
| 24.3.2021 | Olomouc | Sparta Praha | 2-3 |
| 25.3.2021 | Olomouc | Sparta Praha | 0-3 |
Sparta Praha wins the series 4-0.

Mladá Boleslav – Pardubice 4-0
| 18.3.2021 | Mladá Boleslav | Pardubice | 2-0 |
| 19.3.2021 | Mladá Boleslav | Pardubice | 5-0 |
| 22.3.2021 | Pardubice | Mladá Boleslav | 2-4 |
| 23.3.2021 | Pardubice | Mladá Boleslav | 3-5 |
Mladá Boleslav wins the series 4-0.

Třinec – Kometa Brno 4-0
| 20.3.2021 | Třinec | Kometa Brno | 5-0 |
| 21.3.2021 | Třinec | Kometa Brno | 7-2 |
| 24.3.2021 | Kometa Brno | Třinec | 1-4 |
| 25.3.2021 | Kometa Brno | Třinec | 1-4 |
Třinec wins the series 4-0.

Liberec – Mountfield HK 4-0
| 18.3.2021 | Liberec | Mountfield HK | 4-3 OT1 |
| 19.3.2021 | Liberec | Mountfield HK | 3-0 |
| 22.3.2021 | Mountfield HK | Liberec | 0-3 |
| 23.3.2021 | Mountfield HK | Liberec | 1-3 |
Liberec wins the series 4-0.

=== Semifinals ===
Sparta Praha – Liberec 3-4
| 3.4.2021 | Sparta Praha | Liberec | 1-5 |
| 4.4.2021 | Sparta Praha | Liberec | 1-3 |
| 7.4.2021 | Liberec | Sparta Praha | 3-2 OT1 |
| 8.4.2021 | Liberec | Sparta Praha | 0-5 |
| 11.4.2021 | Sparta Praha | Liberec | 3-2 OT1 |
| 13.4.2021 | Liberec | Sparta Praha | 2-3 OT1 |
| 15.4.2021 | Sparta Praha | Liberec | 1-2 |
Liberec wins the series 4-3.

Třinec – Mladá Boleslav 4-3
| 3.4.2021 | Třinec | Mladá Boleslav | 2-0 |
| 4.4.2021 | Třinec | Mladá Boleslav | 1-3 |
| 7.4.2021 | Mladá Boleslav | Třinec | 1-3 |
| 8.4.2021 | Mladá Boleslav | Třinec | 2-1 |
| 11.4.2021 | Třinec | Mladá Boleslav | 3-0 |
| 13.4.2021 | Mladá Boleslav | Třinec | 4-2 |
| 15.4.2021 | Třinec | Mladá Boleslav | 3-0 |
Třinec wins the series 4-3.

=== Finals ===
| 18 April 2021; 18:00 | Třinec | 6–2 (3–0, 3–2, 0–0) score in the series: 1–0 | Liberec | Werk Arena, Třinec; Attendance: 477 |

Game reference

| 19 April 2021; 17:00 | Třinec | 3–1 (0–0, 2–0, 1–1) score in the series: 2–0 | Liberec | Werk Arena, Třinec; Attendance: 424 |

Game reference

| 22 April 2021; 18:30 | Liberec | 3–0 (2–0, 0–0, 1–0) score in the series: 1–2 | Třinec | Home Credit Arena, Liberec; Attendance: 300 |

Game reference

| 23 April 2021; 17:00 | Liberec | 0–1 OT (0–0, 0–0, 0–0) (OT: 0–1) score in the series: 1–3 | Třinec | Home Credit Arena, Liberec; Attendance: 300 |

Game reference

| 26 April 2021; 17:00 | Třinec | 3–0 (0–0, 1–0, 2–0) score in the series: 4–1 | Liberec | Werk Arena, Třinec; Attendance: 879 |

Game reference

Třinec wins the finals 4–1.

== Final rankings ==
| Gold medal | Třinec |
| Silver medal | Liberec |
| Bronze medal | Sparta Praha |
| 4 | Mladá Boleslav |
| 5 | Mountfield HK |
| 6 | Pardubice |
| 7 | Kometa Brno |
| 8 | Olomouc |
| 9 | Plzeň |
| 10 | Vítkovice |
| 11 | Karlovy Vary |
| 12 | Litvínov |
| 13 | Zlín |
| 14 | České Budějovice |
