= 2024–25 Czech Extraliga season =

- League: Czech Extraliga
- Sport: Ice hockey
- Duration: 17 September 2024 – 4 March 2025 (Regular season)
- Teams: 14

Regular season
- Pohár Jaroslava Pouzara: HC Sparta Praha

Playoffs

Finals
- Champions: Kometa Brno
- Runners-up: Pardubice

Czech Extraliga seasons
- 2023–24 2025–26

The 2024–25 Czech Extraliga season was the 32nd season of the Czech Extraliga since its creation after the breakup of Czechoslovakia and the Czechoslovak First Ice Hockey League in 1993. HC Sparta Praha drew the highest average home league attendance with 12,804.

== Regular season ==
Each team play 52 games, playing each of the other 13 teams four times – twice at home, and twice away. Points were awarded for each game, where three points are awarded for winning in regulation time, two points for winning in overtime or shootout, one point for losing in overtime or shootout, and zero points for losing in regulation time. At the end of the regular season, the team that finishes with the most points is crowned winner of the regular season.

=== Standings ===
Pos	Team	Pld	W	OTW	OTL	L	GF	GA	GD	Pts	Qualification
1	Sparta Praha	52	29	7	3	13	177	110	+67	104	Advance to Playoffs, Regular season winners and Champions Hockey League
2	Mountfield HK	52	26	4	5	17	137	130	+7	91	Advance to Playoffs and Champions Hockey League
3	Pardubice	52	25	4	5	18	149	126	+23	88	Qualification to Quarter-finals
4	Kometa Brno (C)	52	21	7	7	17	147	139	+8	84	Qualification to Quarter-finals
5	Karlovy Vary	52	20	7	8	17	142	139	+3	82	Qualification to Wild card round
6	České Budějovice	52	19	9	5	19	141	148	−7	80	Qualification to Wild card round
7	Litvínov	52	25	1	3	23	123	128	−5	80	Qualification to Wild card round
8	Plzeň	52	16	11	8	17	118	133	−15	78	Qualification to Wild card round
9	Mladá Boleslav	52	17	9	7	19	137	136	+1	76	Qualification to Wild card round
10	Třinec	52	18	5	10	19	121	123	−2	74	Qualification to Wild card round
11	Liberec	52	17	6	8	21	141	149	−8	71	Qualification to Wild card round
12	Vítkovice	52	19	2	3	28	144	162	−18	64	Qualification to Wild card round
13	Kladno	52	18	2	5	27	141	164	−23	63	
14	Olomouc	52	14	6	3	29	121	152	−31	57	Qualification to Play Out

Source: Tipsport Extraliga
Rules for classification: 1) Points; 2) Head-to-head points.
(C) Play-off Champions and Champions Hockey League

=== Statistics ===
==== Scoring leaders ====
The following shows the top ten players who led the league in points, at the conclusion of the regular season.

Player	Team	GP	G	A	Pts	+/–	PIM
(Latvia) Eduards Tralmaks	Kladno	48	23	28	51	+4	66
(Czech Republic) Ondřej Beránek	Karlovy Vary	51	30	20	50	+17	26
(Czech Republic) Filip Chlapík	Sparta Praha	49	15	33	48	+25	36
(Czech Republic) Jakub Flek	Kometa Brno	45	24	23	47	+2	9
(Czech Republic) Roman Červenka	Pardubice	50	19	27	46	+13	14
(Czech Republic) Jiří Černoch	Karlovy Vary	50	14	31	45	+15	29
(Canada) Anthony Nellis	Vítkovice	51	23	20	43	+7	10
(Slovakia) Róbert Lantoši	Liberec	51	11	31	42	-3	45
(Czech Republic) Oscar Flynn	Liberec	49	24	17	41	-8	55
(Czech Republic) Ondřej Kaše	Litvínov	44	15	26	41	-7	22

==== Leading goaltenders ====
The following shows the top ten goaltenders who led the league in goals against average, provided that they have played at least 40% of their team's minutes, at the conclusion of the regular season.

Player	Team	GP	TOI	W	L	GA	SO	Sv%	GAA
(Czech Republic) Josef Kořenář	Sparta Praha	34	2038	24	9	58	6	92.50	1.71
(Slovakia) Stanislav Škorvánek	Mountfield HK	34	2035	21	13	69	4	91.91	2.03
(Czech Republic) Ondřej Kacetl	Třinec	31	1861	16	14	64	3	91.72	2.06
(Czech Republic) Nick Malík	Plzeň	39	2343	20	17	81	2	92.40	2.07
(Czech Republic) Šimon Zajíček	Litvínov	29	1668	15	13	59	5	92.97	2.12
(Czech Republic) Roman Will	Pardubice	37	2169	21	16	78	5	91.40	2.16
(Czech Republic) Dominik Furch	Mladá Boleslav	40	2406	24	16	88	4	92.04	2.19
(Czech Republic) Marek Mazanec	Třinec	22	1307	7	15	50	1	92.04	2.30

== Relegation series ==
The promotion/relegation series featured HC Olomouc, the last-place team in the regular season, and HC Dukla Jihlava, the 1. Liga winners. Olomouc swept the best-of-seven series and will remain in the Extraliga in 2025–26.

== Playoffs ==
Twelve teams qualify for the playoffs: the top four teams in the regular season have a bye to the quarterfinals, while teams ranked fifth to twelfth meet each other (5 versus 12, 6 versus 11, 7 versus 10, 8 versus 9) in a preliminary playoff round.

=== Bracket ===
Wild-card round (best-of-5)
8	Plzeň	1
9	Mladá Boleslav	3
6	České Budějovice	3
11	Liberec	2
7	Litvínov	1
10	Třinec	3
5	Karlovy Vary	3
12	Vítkovice	2

Quarter-finals (best-of-7)
2	Mountfield HK	4
9	Mladá Boleslav	3
3	Pardubice	4
6	České Budějovice	0
1	Sparta Praha	4
10	Třinec	1
4	Kometa Brno	4
5	Karlovy Vary	2

Semi-finals (best-of-7)
2	Mountfield HK	1
3	Pardubice	4
(Pairings are re-seeded after the first and second round)
1	Sparta Praha	3
4	Kometa Brno	4

Finals (best-of-7)
3	Pardubice	3
4	Kometa Brno	4

Here is your code with all dates converted to standard DMY prose format per MOS:DATE:

=== Wild card round ===
Karlovy Vary – Vítkovice 3–2
7 March 2025	Karlovy Vary	Vítkovice	4-3 OT
8 March 2025	Karlovy Vary	Vítkovice	2-5
10 March 2025	Vítkovice	Karlovy Vary	4-3 SO
11 March 2025	Vítkovice	Karlovy Vary	1-3
13 March 2025	Karlovy Vary	Vítkovice	2-1
Karlovy Vary won the series 3–2.

Litvínov – Třinec 1–3
7 March 2025	Litvínov	Třinec	2-1 OT
8 March 2025	Litvínov	Třinec	2-4
10 March 2025	Třinec	Litvínov	3-2
11 March 2025	Třinec	Litvínov	4-1
Třinec won the series 3–1.

České Budějovice – Liberec 3–2
7 March 2025	České Budějovice	Liberec	4-2
8 March 2025	České Budějovice	Liberec	0-1
10 March 2025	Liberec	České Budějovice	3-0
11 March 2025	Liberec	České Budějovice	0-3
13 March 2025	České Budějovice	Liberec	3-2 OT
České Budějovice won the series 3–2.

Plzeň – Mladá Boleslav 1–3
7 March 2025	Plzeň	Mladá Boleslav	3-5
8 March 2025	Plzeň	Mladá Boleslav	2-3
10 March 2025	Mladá Boleslav	Plzeň	0-3
11 March 2025	Mladá Boleslav	Plzeň	1-0 OT
Mladá Boleslav won the series 3–1.

=== Quarterfinals ===
Sparta Praha – Třinec 4–1
16 March 2025	Sparta Praha	Třinec	4-3 OT
17 March 2025	Sparta Praha	Třinec	2-1
20 March 2025	Třinec	Sparta Praha	3-2
21 March 2025	Třinec	Sparta Praha	3-4 OT
24 March 2025	Sparta Praha	Třinec	3-2
Sparta Praha won the series 4–1.

Pardubice – České Budějovice 4–0
18 March 2025	Pardubice	České Budějovice	3-0
19 March 2025	Pardubice	České Budějovice	4-2
22 March 2025	České Budějovice	Pardubice	2-6
23 March 2025	České Budějovice	Pardubice	1-2 OT
Pardubice won the series 4–0.

Mountfield HK – Mladá Boleslav 4–3
16 March 2025	Mountfield HK	Mladá Boleslav	1-2
17 March 2025	Mountfield HK	Mladá Boleslav	0-2
20 March 2025	Mladá Boleslav	Mountfield HK	3-4
21 March 2025	Mladá Boleslav	Mountfield HK	2-3 OT
24 March 2025	Mountfield HK	Mladá Boleslav	4-2
26 March 2025	Mladá Boleslav	Mountfield HK	6-5 OT
28 March 2025	Mountfield HK	Mladá Boleslav	3-0
Mountfield won the series 4–3.

Kometa Brno – Karlovy Vary 4–2
18 March 2025	Kometa Brno	Karlovy Vary	3-4 OT
19 March 2025	Kometa Brno	Karlovy Vary	3-2
22 March 2025	Karlovy Vary	Kometa Brno	0-2
23 March 2025	Karlovy Vary	Kometa Brno	1-0
25 March 2025	Kometa Brno	Karlovy Vary	5-3
27 March 2025	Karlovy Vary	Kometa Brno	0-1
Brno won the series 4–2.

=== Semifinals ===
Sparta Praha – Kometa Brno 3–4
1 April 2025	Sparta Praha	Kometa Brno	2-4
2 April 2025	Sparta Praha	Kometa Brno	3-0
5 April 2025	Kometa Brno	Sparta Praha	3-0
6 April 2025	Kometa Brno	Sparta Praha	0-1
9 April 2025	Sparta Praha	Kometa Brno	3-4 OT
11 April 2025	Kometa Brno	Sparta Praha	0-3
13 April 2025	Sparta Praha	Kometa Brno	1-3
Kometa Brno won the series 4–3.

Mountfield HK – Pardubice 1–4
3 April 2025	Mountfield HK	Pardubice	2-4
4 April 2025	Mountfield HK	Pardubice	3-2
7 April 2025	Pardubice	Mountfield HK	4-0
8 April 2025	Pardubice	Mountfield HK	2-0
10 April 2025	Mountfield HK	Pardubice	1-5
Pardubice won the series 4–1.

=== Finals ===
17 April 2025	Pardubice	1–2 OT (0–0, 1–0, 0–1) (OT: 0–1) score in the series: 0–1	Kometa Brno	Enteria arena, Pardubice; Attendance: 10,194

Game reference

18 April 2025	Pardubice	2–1 (0–0, 2–1, 0–0) score in the series: 1–1	Kometa Brno	Enteria arena, Pardubice; Attendance: 10,194

Game reference

21 April 2025	Kometa Brno	1–4 (0–0, 0–2, 1–2) score in the series: 1–2	Pardubice	Winning Group Arena, Brno; Attendance: 7,700

Game reference

22 April 2025	Kometa Brno	7–4 (2–3, 2–1, 3–0) score in the series: 2–2	Pardubice	Winning Group Arena, Brno; Attendance: 7,700

Game reference

25 April 2025	Pardubice	2–4 (0–1, 0–2, 2–1) score in the series: 2–3	Kometa Brno	Enteria arena, Pardubice; Attendance: 10,194

Game reference

27 April 2025	Kometa Brno	1–5 (0–1, 0–1, 1–3) score in the series: 3–3	Pardubice	Winning Group Arena, Brno; Attendance: 7,700

Game reference

29 April 2025	Pardubice	0–3 (0–1, 0–0, 0–2) score in the series: 3–4; Kometa Brno won title	Kometa Brno	Enteria arena, Pardubice; Attendance: 10,194

Game reference

== Final rankings ==
Gold medal	Kometa Brno
Silver medal	Pardubice
Bronze medal	Sparta Praha
4	Mountfield HK
5	Karlovy Vary
6	České Budějovice
7	Mladá Boleslav
8	Třinec
9	Litvínov
10	Plzeň
11	Liberec
12	Vítkovice
13	Kladno
14	Olomouc
