= HC Energie Karlovy Vary (juniors) =

Czech ice hockey team

HC Energie Karlovy Vary (juniors) is a Czech ice hockey team based in Karlovy Vary. They compete on an international level in the Czech Extraliga juniors league. HC Energie won the Czech Extraliga juniors 2007/08 season, and from 2012 to 2015 competed in the MHL. The team is nicknamed the Wolf Pack. The home stadium of the club is KV Arena. The adult professional ice hockey team they are connected to is HC Energie Karlovy Vary.

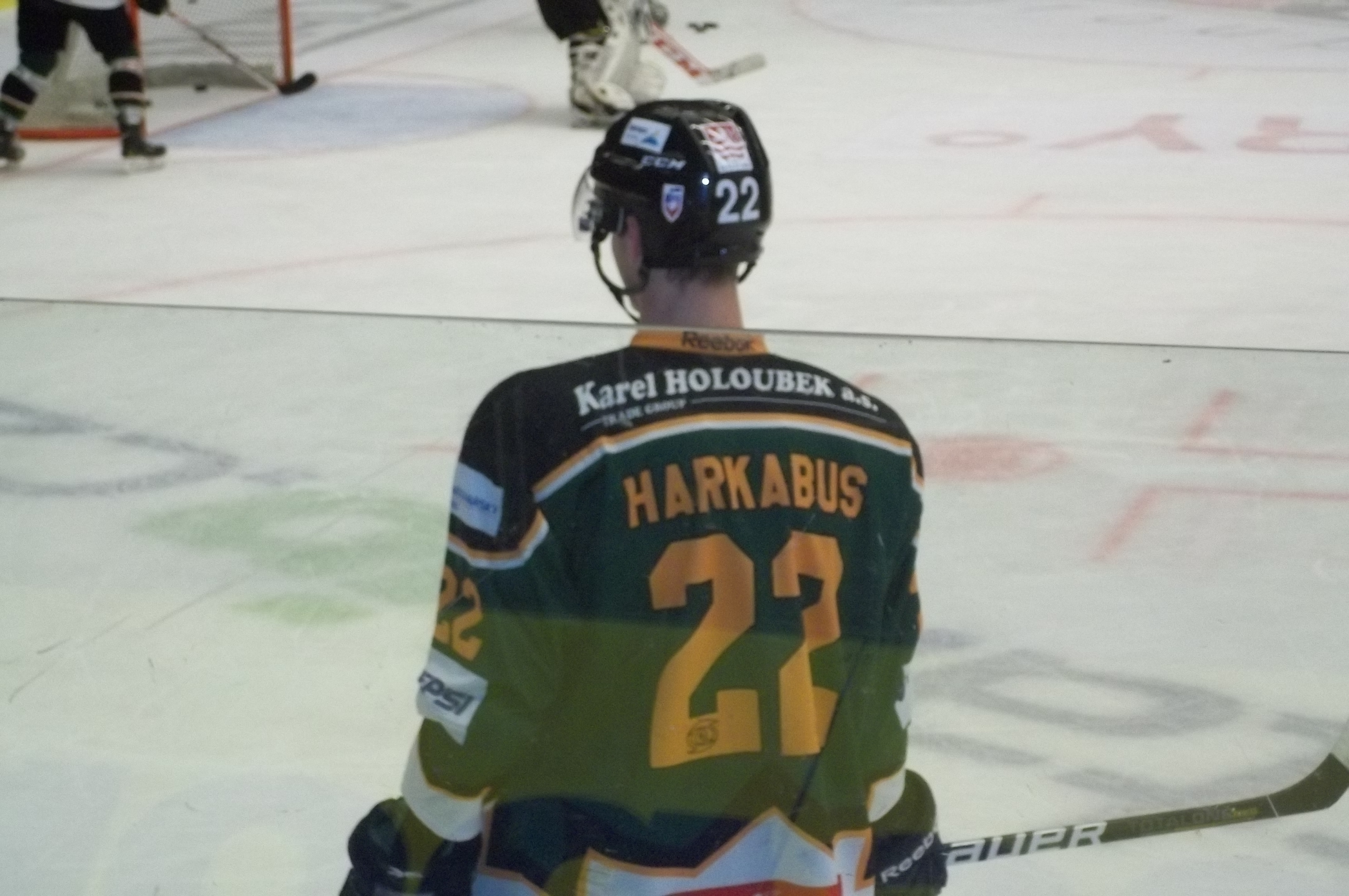
Tomáš Harkabus

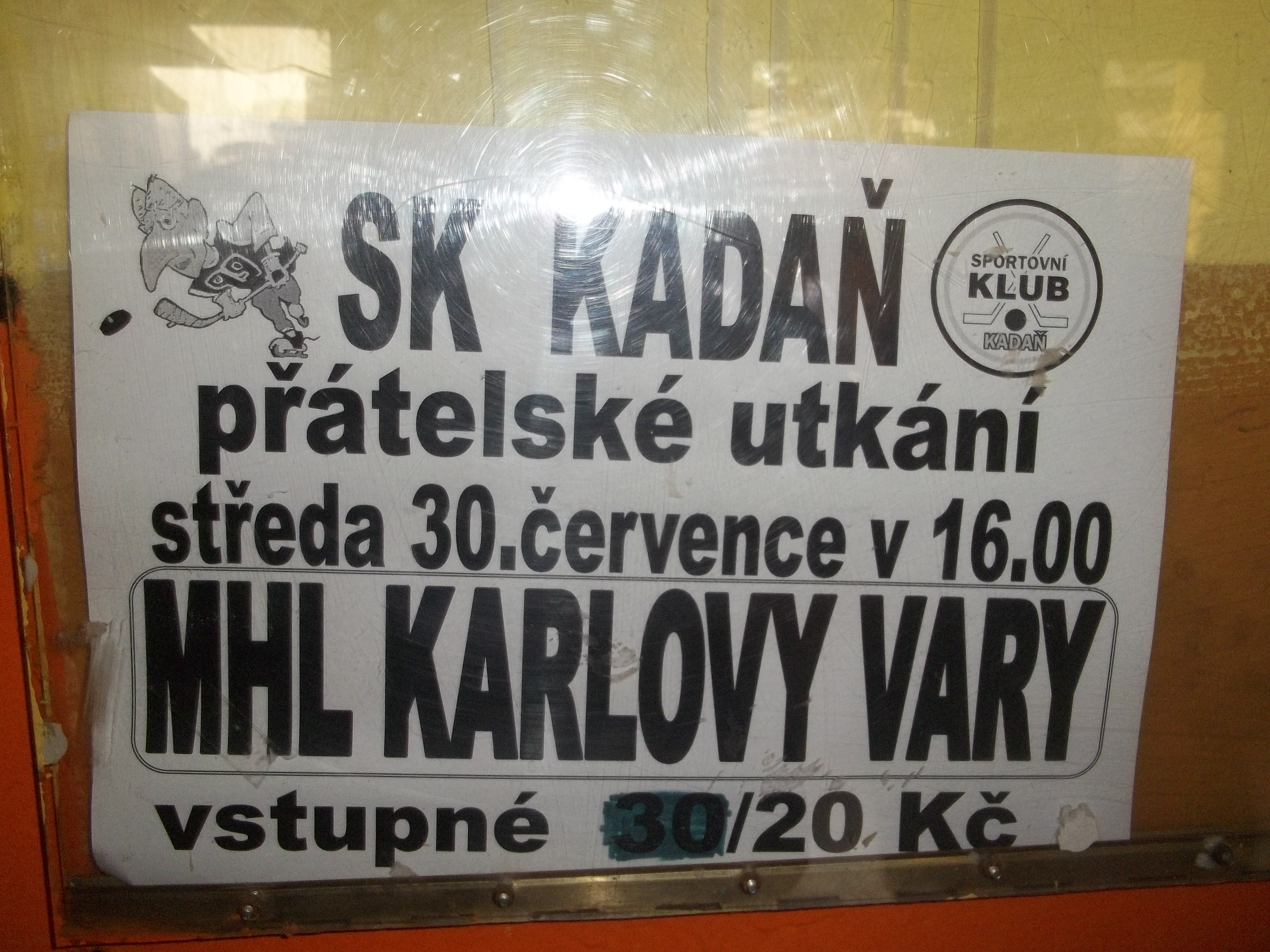
Wrestling in the Kadaňi.

== History ==
The culture of ice hockey in the city of Carlsbad originates with the club called SK Slavia Karlovy Vary back in 1932. However, the youth teams were not formed at the same time. In the 2007/08 season, Karlovy Vary won for the first time the league juniors finals under coach Mikuláš Antoník, when they defeated Zlín. Strong icons of the team at that time were Pavel Kuběna, Tomáš Schmidt, Martin Rohan, and Jakub Mareček.

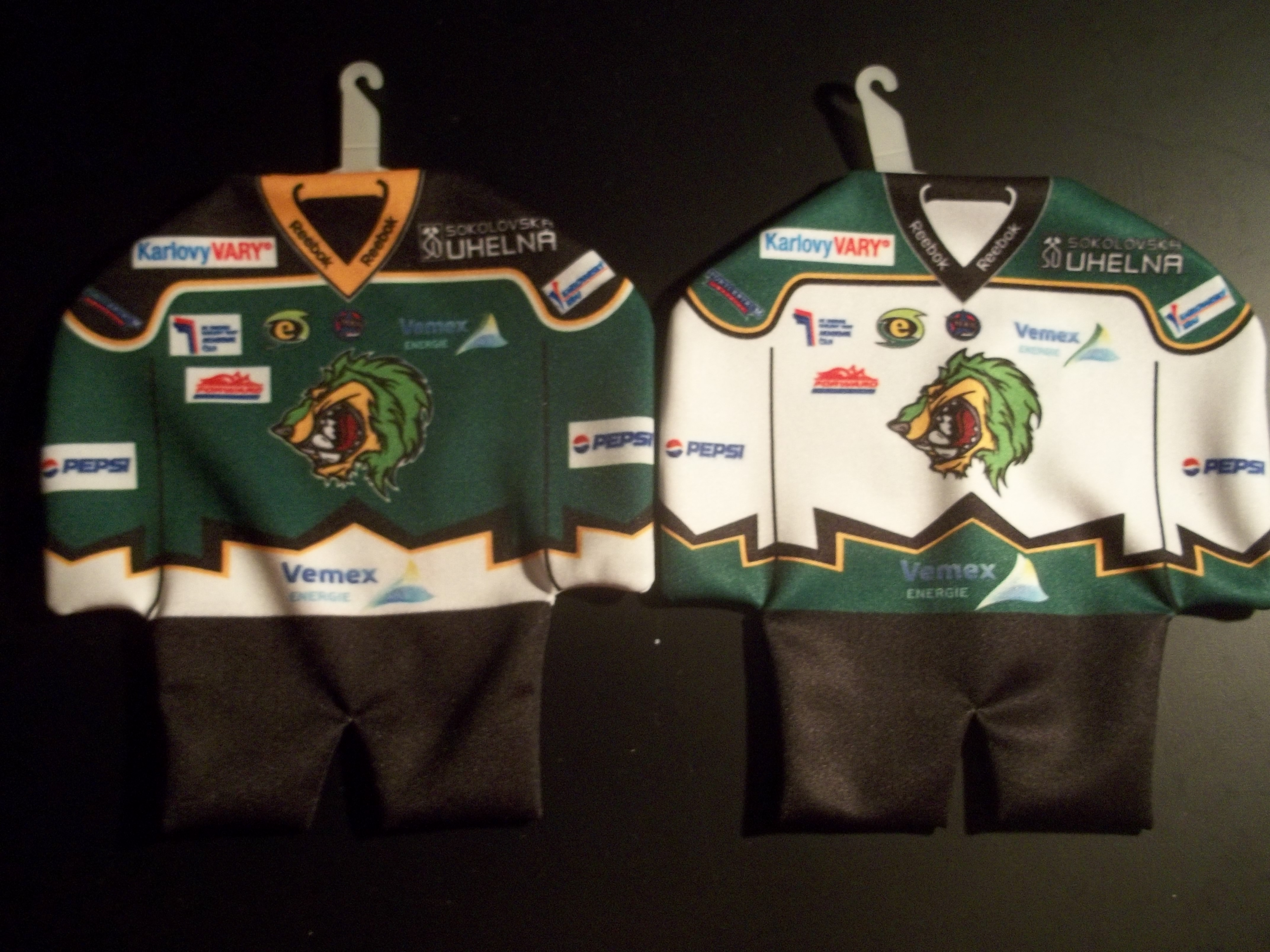
Dres 2014/15

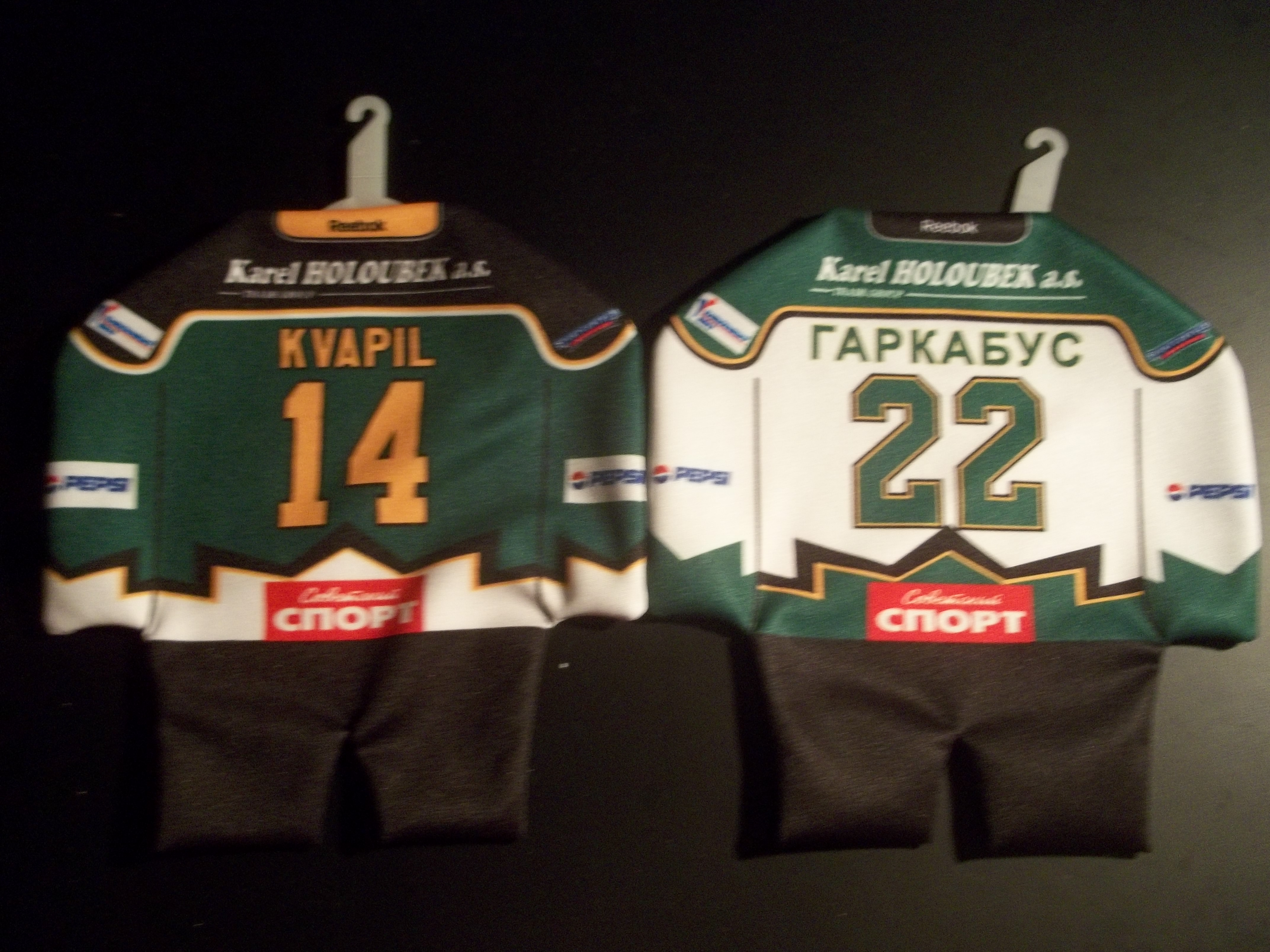
Dres 2014/15

Martin Frk had been playing for the juniors for two years and became one of its most productive players. In the 2009/10 season, he scored 27 goals and 28 assists in 39 matches in the junior section. His acceptance of an offer from overseas without the consent of the club in the summer of 2010 caused the management to consider legal appeals to get him to stay with the team. Eventually, the club won compensation after the intervention of the IIFH.

In the 2010/11 season, Karlovy Vary advanced to the finals of the Extraliga but lost 1:2 on games to Znojmo after the results of 7:3, 0:8 and 2:7.

== MHL ==
In early 2012, under an agreement with the Czech Ice Hockey Associations, HK Energie registered the junior team for the MHL. The agreement incorporated a clause ensuring the HK Energy remained in the institution of the united academies. This event marked the first time the Czech junior hockey club began competing regularly on an international level. Reinforcements were brought from other clubs and two players were recruited from Slovakia.

HK Energy played the Western Conference division, with some games as distant as nearly 8000 km away in the town of Chabarovsk. The first MHL game in Karlovy Vary was played under the coach Karel Mlejnek on September 2, 2012. HK Energy defeated Patriot Budapest 4:1 and advanced from seventh place in the qualification to the playoff, where they later lost to Spartak Moscow 2:3 on games. At that time, eight of Spartak's players had played in the KHL. Vojtech Tomeček earned a total of 62 points, scoring 28 goals and 34 assists in 60 matches, Vladislav Habal was, with an average of 2.12 goals against per match, the fifth best goaltender of the regular season.

The results exceeded the expectations of Karlovy Vary. Marek Švec acknowledged the level of competition to be significantly better than the top junior league, on both a physical and technical level.

Following the team's successful experience in their first season, HK Energy remained in the MHL for several seasons. The solid performance of the team is also an achievement of the coach, Karel Mlejnek, especially the winning streak in December 2013, guaranteeing the participation of the team in the playoffs. The team played the first playoff round in 2013 against Yunost Minsk. Their Belarusian opponent led 2:0 on games, but the Energy was able to turn the series and advance to the second round finishing among the top sixteen teams, the same as the year before. In the second round of the playoffs, HK Energy played Spartak, though lost 1:3 of the games played. The coach of Spartak club Oleg Brataš called the Energy a "really strong team".

== Roster ==
Coach Tomáš Mariška, Jiří Žůrek, Milan Čejka

Pozice	Hráč
Goaltenders	David Fečo
	Jakub Frček
	Tomáš Fučík
	Ondřej Kuchař
defenders	Jiří Běhal
	Tomáš Dvořák
	Martin Kečkeš
	Patrik Michálek
	Jan Priškin
	Jöel Röthlisberger
	Adam Rulík
	Ondřej Šafář
	Denis Šimek
	Radomír Vaněk
	Martin Weinhold
attackers	Ondřej Beránek
	Štěpán Csamangó
	Sebastian Gorčík
	Dávid Gríger
	Tomáš Harkabus
	Daniel Hroch
	Jiří Janata
	Martin Kohout
	Alexandr Molnár
	Jakub Orság
	Martin Osmík
	Tomáš Rubeš
	Luděk Škop
	Oto Táborský
	Jakub Vrána
	Matěj Zadražil

== Galerie ==
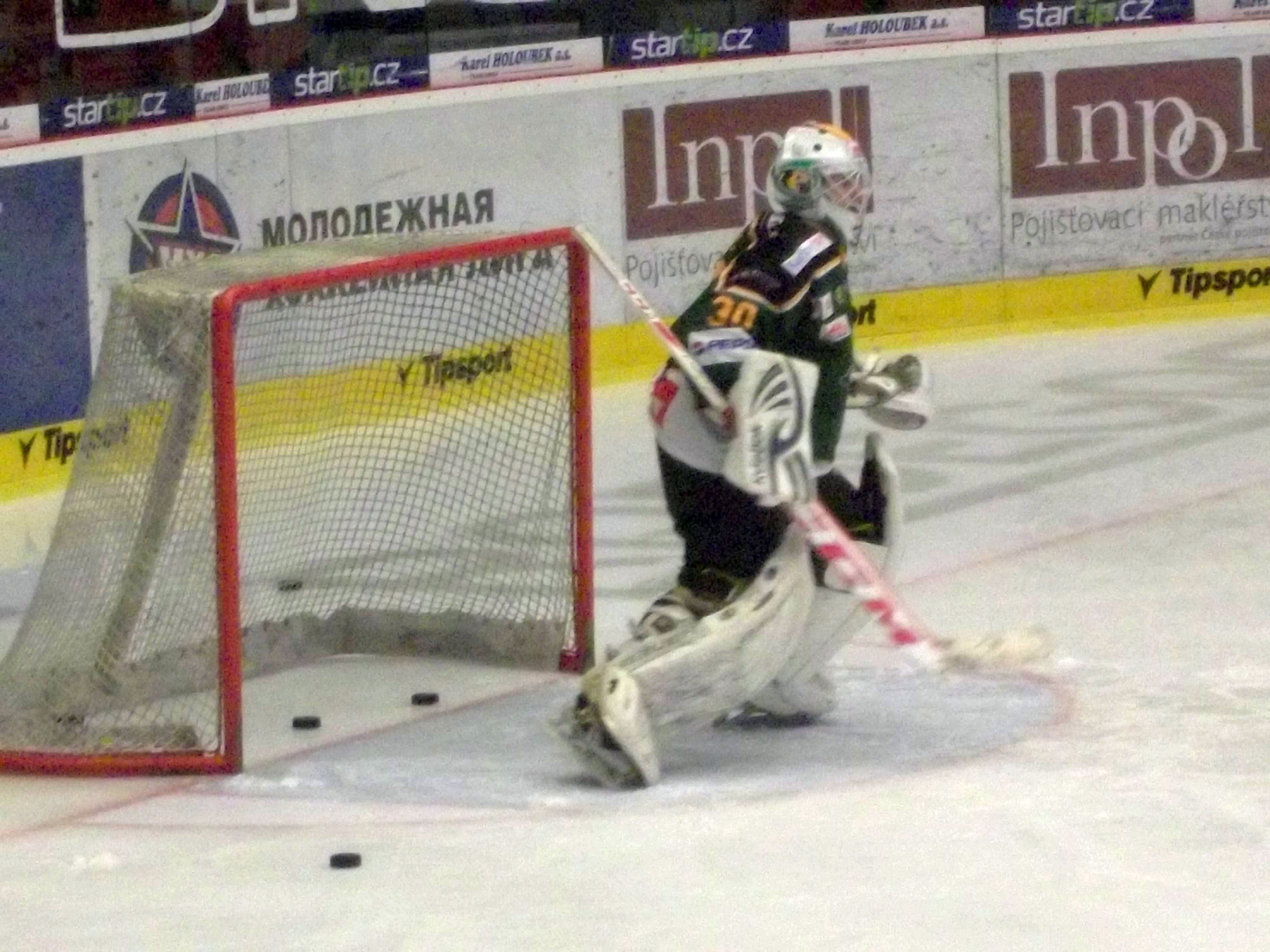
David Fečo

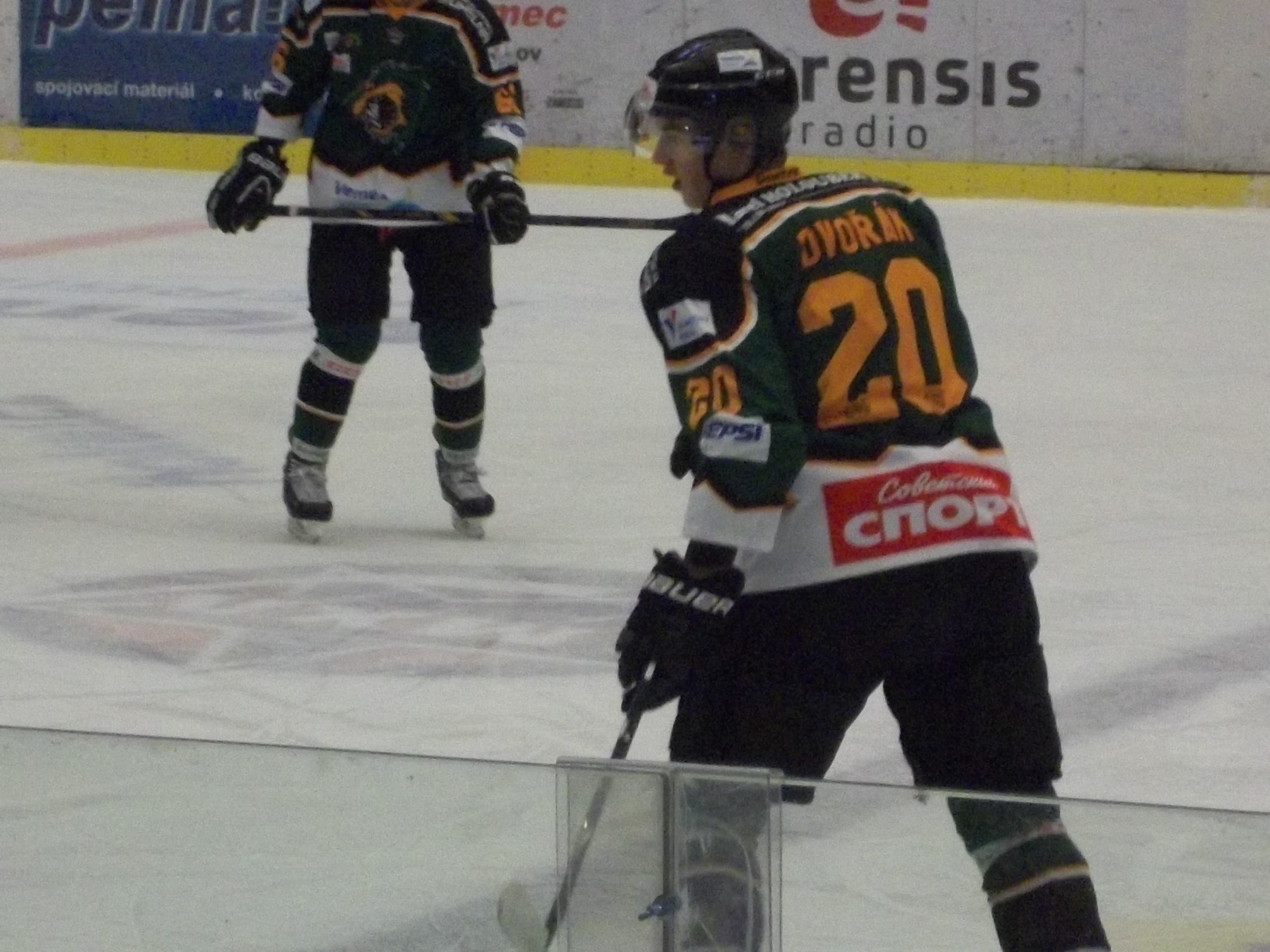
Tomáš Dvořák

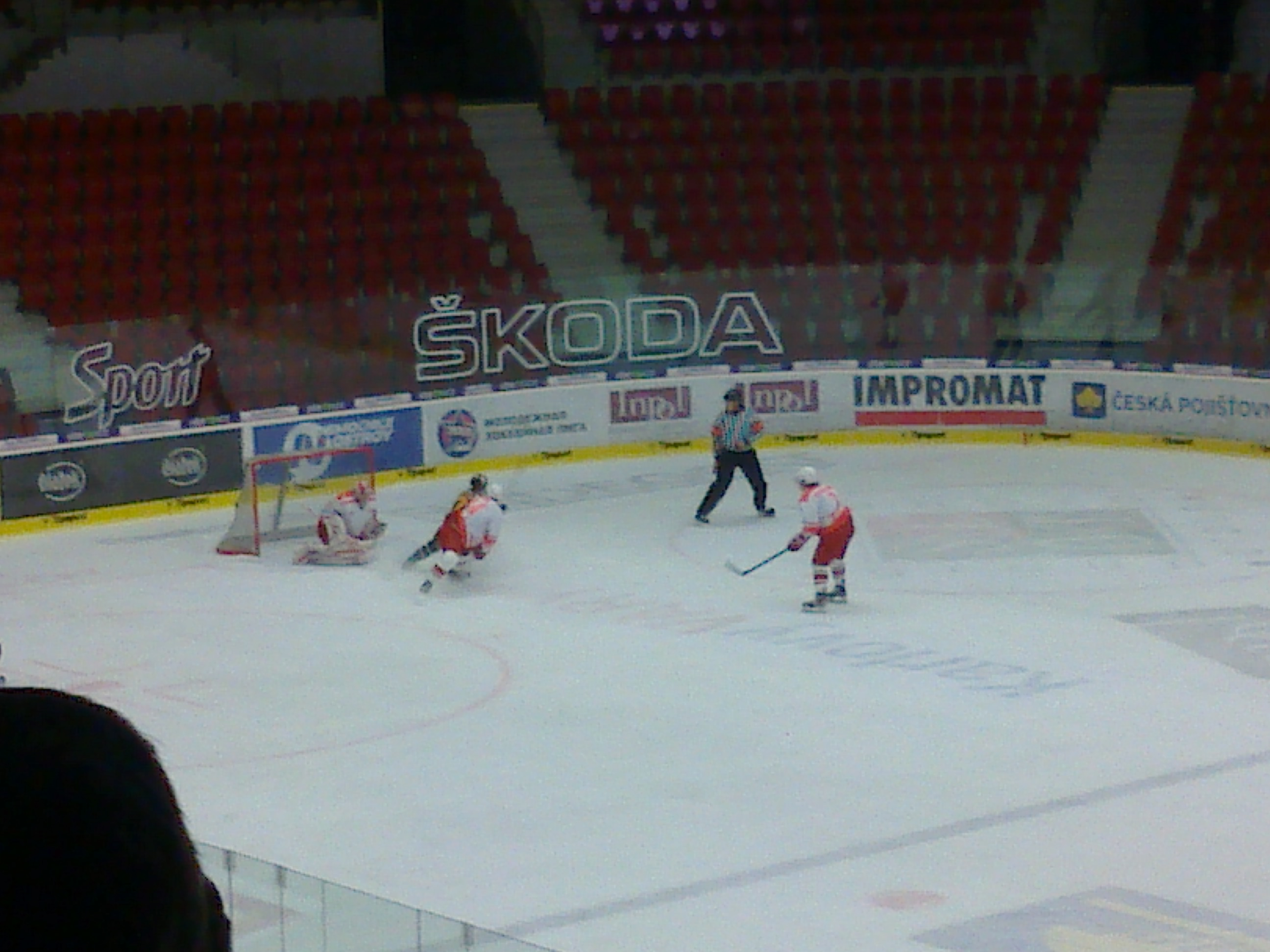
Match vs Spartak Moskva

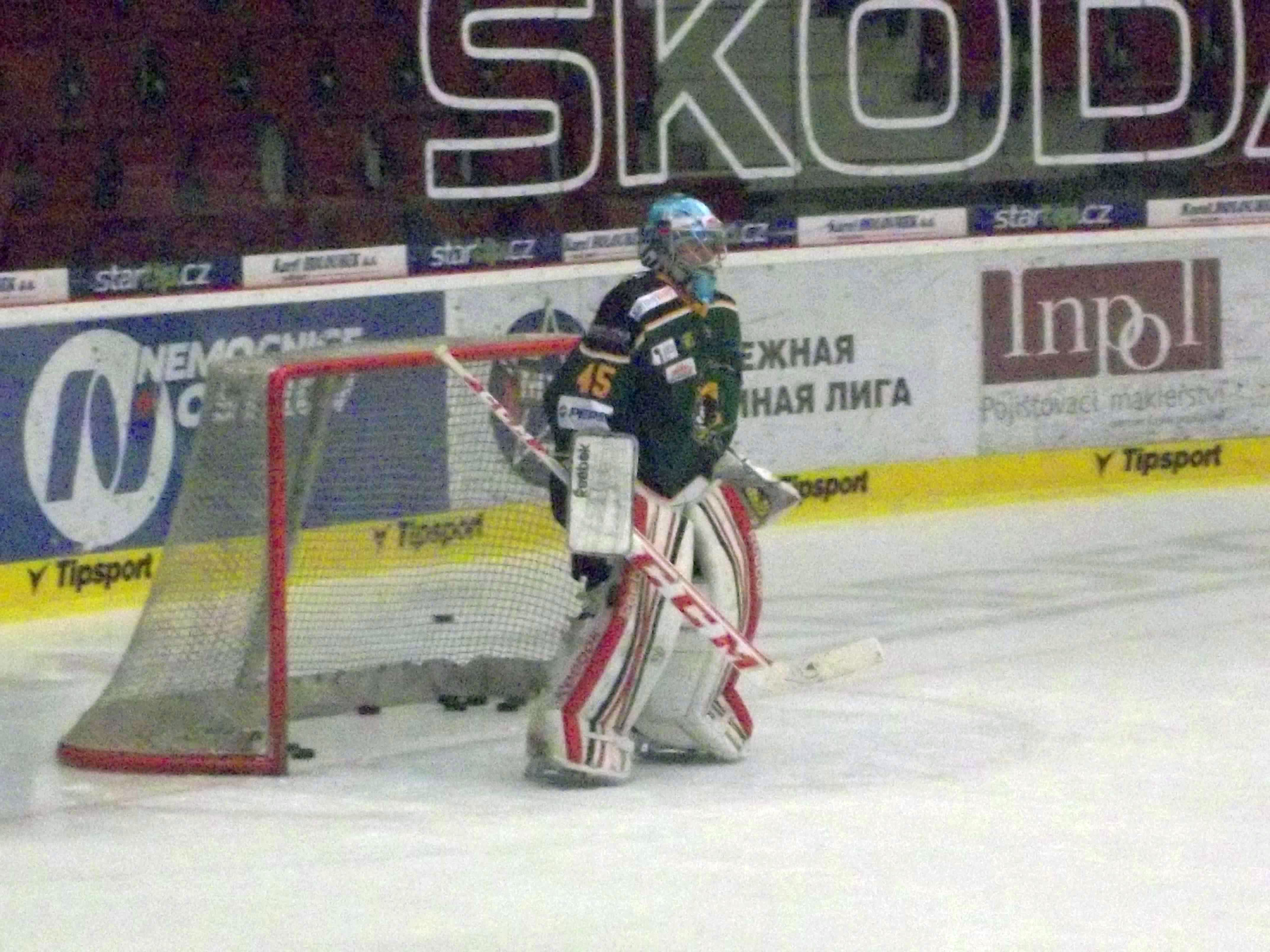
Jakub Frček

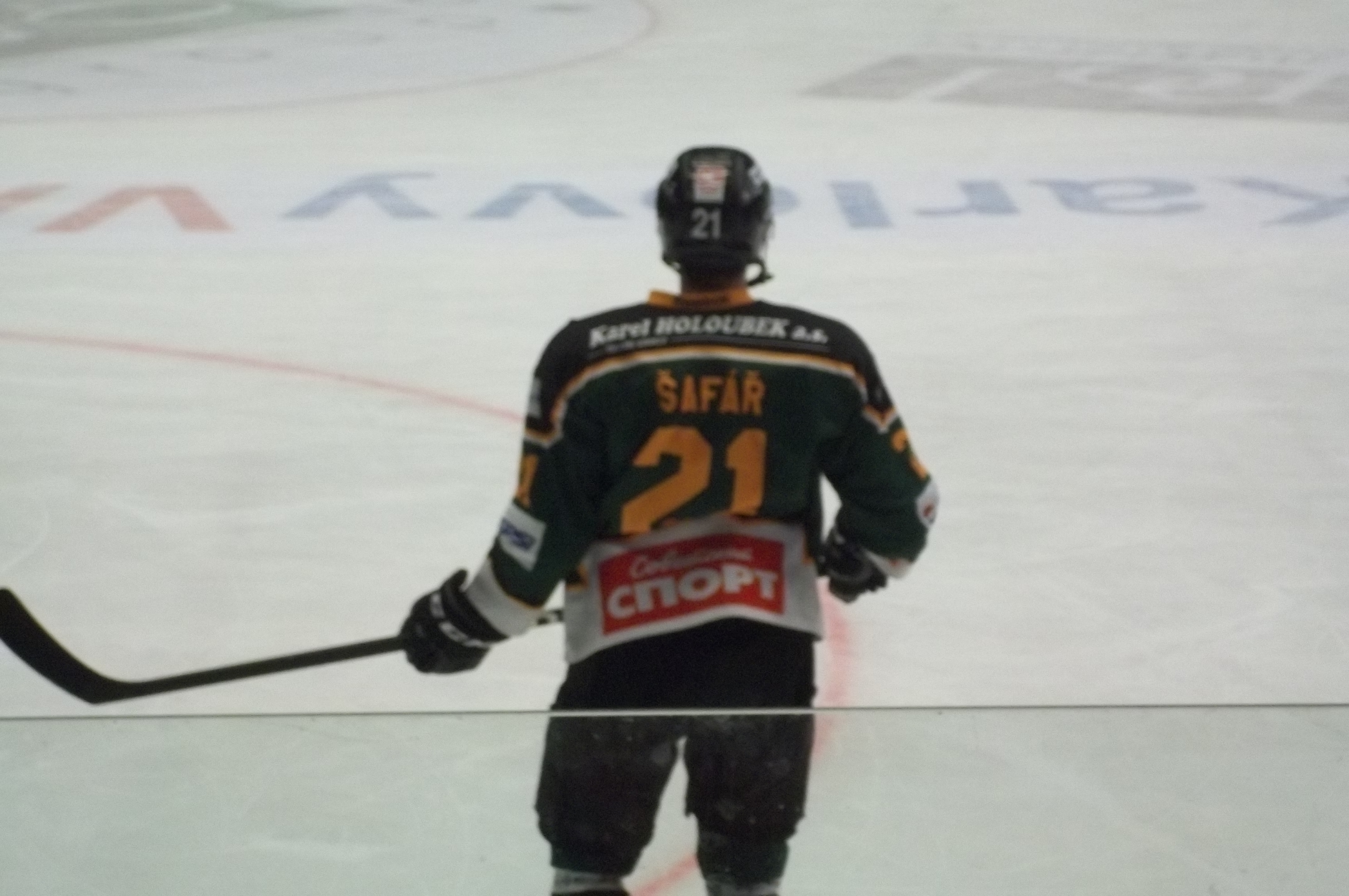
Ondřej Šafář

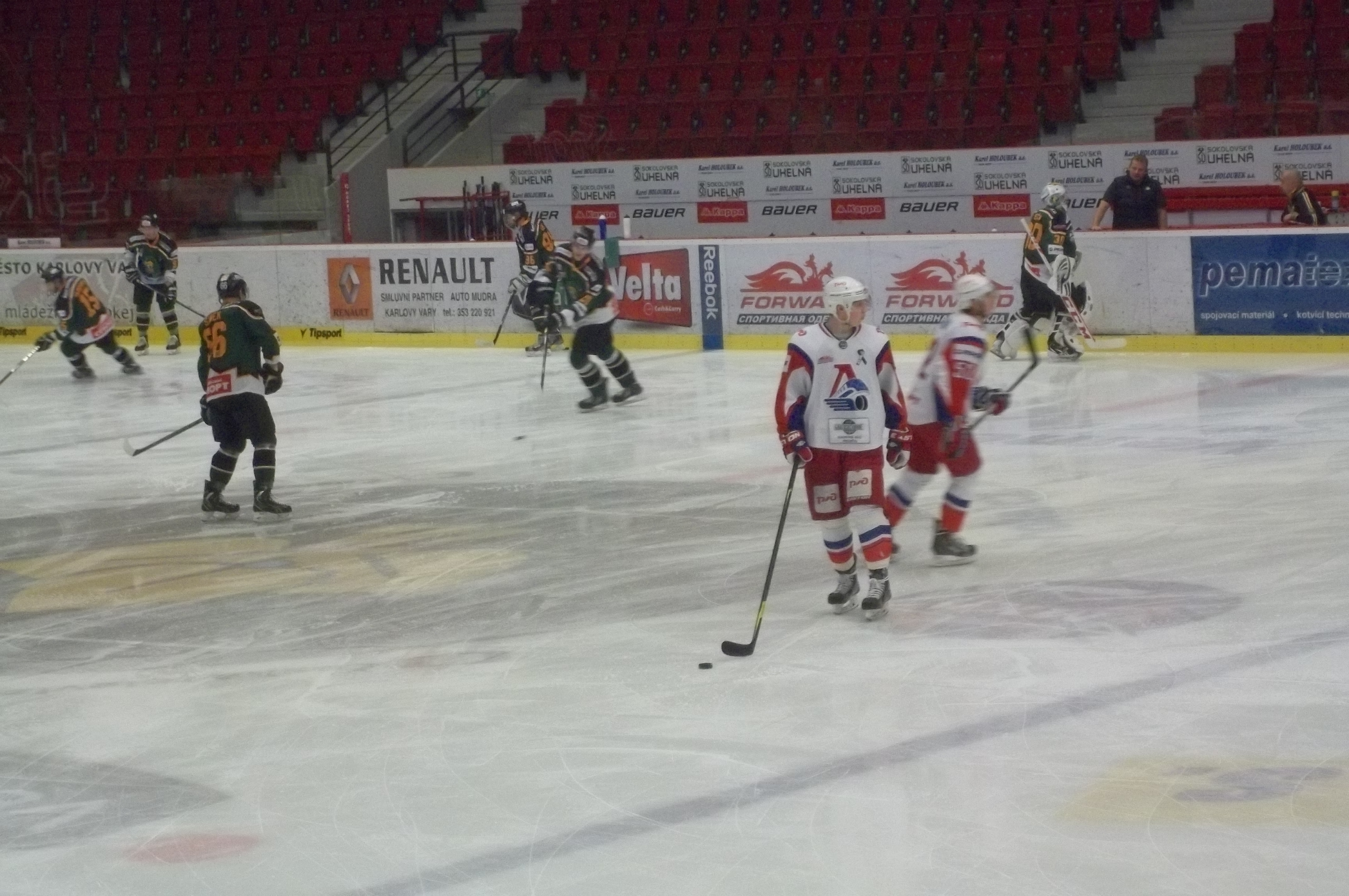
Match vs Loko Jaroslavl

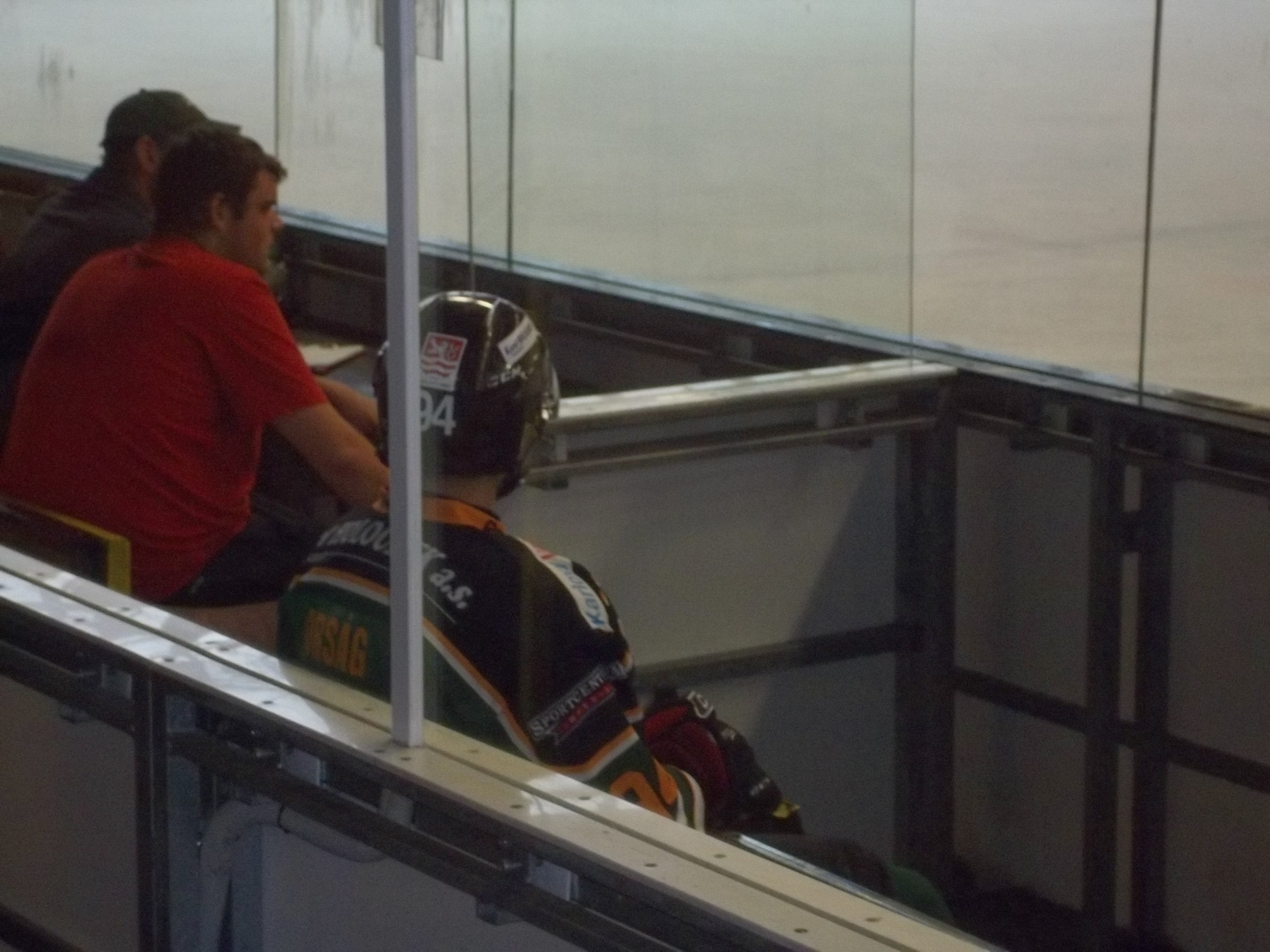

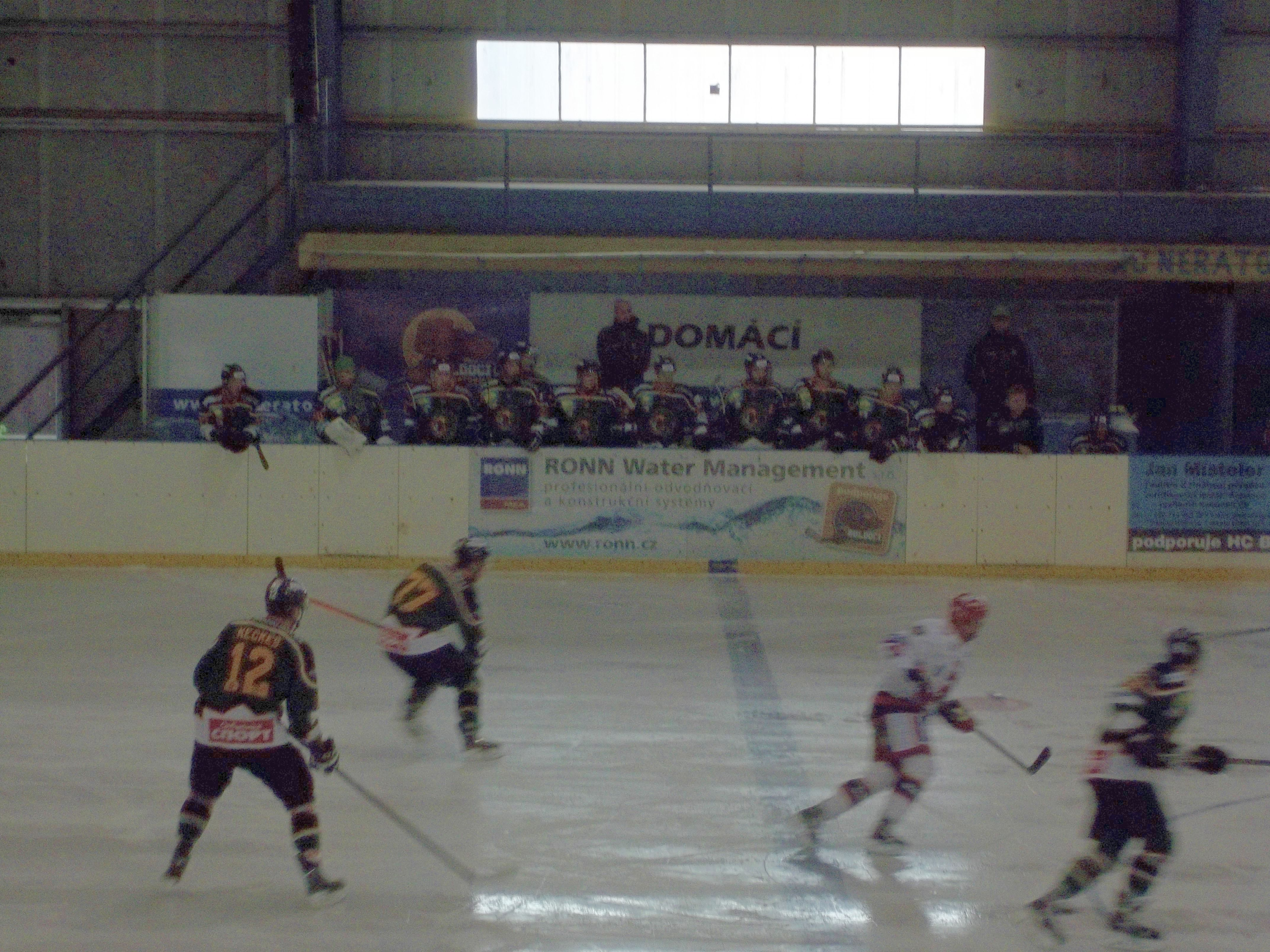
