= Tomáš Rohan =

Czech ice hockey player

- Born: January 1, 1989 (age 37) Kraslice, Czechoslovakia
- Height: 5 ft 6 in (168 cm)
- Weight: 163 lb (74 kg; 11 st 9 lb)
- Position: Forward
- Shoots: Left
- Chance Liga team Former teams: HC Baník Sokolov; HC Karlovy Vary
- Playing career: 2010–present

Tomáš Rohan (born January 1, 1989) is a Czech professional ice hockey forward for HC Baník Sokolov of the Chance Liga.

Rohan previously played 103 games with HC Karlovy Vary in the Czech Extraliga.

His younger brother Martin Rohan is also a professional ice hockey player.
