= Rulík =

Rulík (feminine: Rulíková) is a Czech surname, meaning 'belladona'. Notable people with the surname include:

- Adam Rulík, Czech ice hockey player
- Jan Rulík (1744–1812), Czech Renaissance writer, composer and singer
- Radim Rulík, Czech ice hockey coach
