= Martin Frk =

Czech ice hockey player (born 1993)

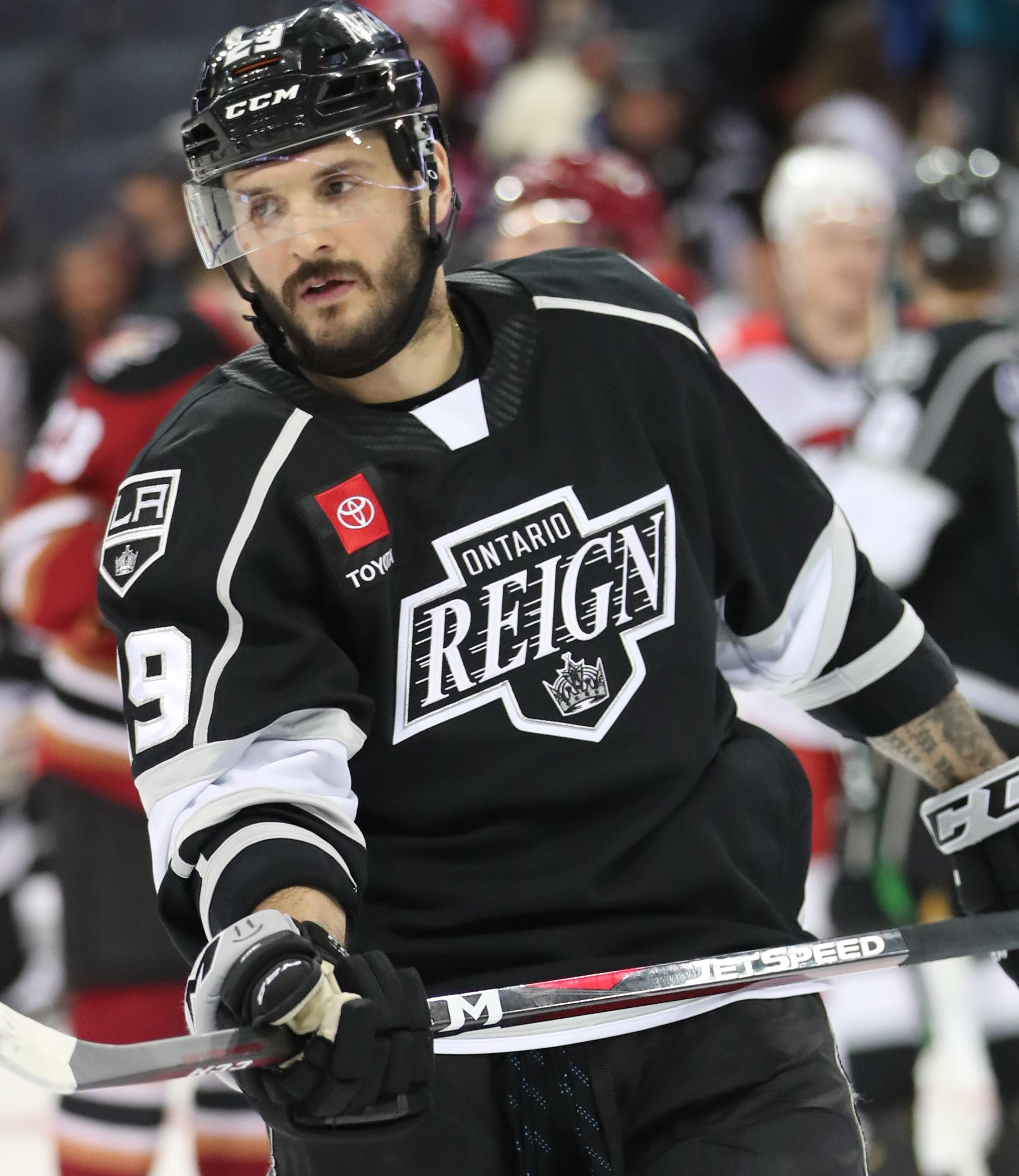
- Frk with the Ontario Reign in 2020
- Born: 5 October 1993 (age 32) Pelhřimov, Czech Republic
- Height: 6 ft 1 in (185 cm)
- Weight: 205 lb (93 kg; 14 st 9 lb)
- Position: Right wing
- Shoots: Right
- KHL team Former teams: Shanghai Dragons; Carolina Hurricanes; Detroit Red Wings; Los Angeles Kings; SC Bern; SC Rapperswil-Jona Lakers
- NHL draft: 49th overall, 2012; Detroit Red Wings
- Playing career: 2013–present

Martin Frk (/ˈfɜːrk/; Czech: [ˈmarcɪn ˈfr̩k]; born 5 October 1993) is a Czech professional ice hockey forward for the Shanghai Dragons of the Kontinental Hockey League (KHL). Frk was drafted 49th overall by the Detroit Red Wings in the 2012 NHL entry draft.

== Playing career ==
=== Junior ===
During the 2009–10 season, Martin Frk was the leading scorer for HC Energie Karlovy Vary (juniors) in the Czech Extraliga. Frk recorded 28 goals and 30 assists and had a league-leading 186 penalty minutes in 41 games. Frk scored two goals and three assists in five playoff games. He played eight games with HC Karlovy Vary U18 and scored nine goals and assists. Frk was drafted 24th overall in the 2010 KHL Junior Draft by HC Yugra. The Halifax Mooseheads drafted him 3rd overall in the CHL Import Draft.

During the 2010–11 season, Frk was the second-leading scorer for Halifax in his first season in North America. Frk recorded 22 goals and 28 assists in 62 games with the Mooseheads. Halifax reached the QMJHL playoffs despite winning just 20 games. In the four-game first-round series against Montreal, Frk had two assists.

In the 2011–12 season, Frk suffered a concussion in the pre-season that kept him out until December but he had a strong second half as the Mooseheads were one of the QMJHL's big turnaround stories. Frk recorded 16 goals and 13 assists in 34 games. Halifax finished second to powerhouse Saint John in the Maritimes Division and advanced to the playoff semifinals. In 17 playoff games Frk scored five goals and six assists. Frk was invited to the NHL Draft Combine and ranked 20th amongst North American skaters in Central Scouting's final rankings prior to the 2012 NHL draft.

During the 2012–13 season, Frk skated for the Memorial Cup champion Halifax Mooseheads. Frk was the second-leading scorer for Halifax in his third season, recording 35 goals and 49 assists in 56 regular-season games. The Mooseheads had the QMJHL's best record and defeated Baie-Comeau in the league finals. Frk scored 13 goals and 20 assists in 17 playoff games. Frk was fourth among all scorers at the Memorial Cup, finishing with five goals and four assists in four games. The Mooseheads defeated WHL champion Portland Winterhawks in the Memorial Cup Finals.

=== Professional ===
On 31 July 2012, the Detroit Red Wings signed Frk to a three-year entry-level contract. Frk played within the Red Wings affiliates, the Grand Rapids Griffins and Toledo Walleye for the duration of his entry-level deal.

Prior to the 2016–17 season, Frk was claimed off waivers by the Carolina Hurricanes on 9 October 2016. Remaining on the Hurricanes roster, Frk made his NHL debut in a 3–2 defeat to the Edmonton Oilers on 18 October. By making his debut, Frk became the first player in NHL history to not have a vowel in his last name. He appeared in one more game, against his former club, the Detroit Red Wings, before on 1 November, he returned to Detroit after he was re-claimed on waivers from the Hurricanes. The Red Wings reassigned him to their AHL affiliate club, the Grand Rapids Griffins.

On 18 July 2017, the Red Wings signed Frk to a one-year contract extension. On 30 September, it was announced Frk had made the season-opening roster for the Red Wings. On 5 October, Frk scored his first career NHL goal against Devan Dubnyk of the Minnesota Wild. During the 2017–18 season, in his first full NHL season, Frk recorded 11 goals and 14 assists in 68 games. On 25 June 2018, the Red Wings signed Frk to a one-year contract extension. Frk was the recipient of the Red Wings/Detroit Sports Media 2018 Rookie of the Year Award, selected annually by DSM members.

On 14 February 2019, Frk was assigned to the Grand Rapids Griffins. Prior to being assigned to the Griffins, he recorded one goal and four assists in 25 games for the Red Wings. During the 2018–19 season, Frk recorded one goal and five assists in 30 games for the Red Wings. Following the completion of the Red Wings' season, he was reassigned to the Griffins.

On 1 July 2019, Frk signed as a free agent to a one-year, two-way contract with the Los Angeles Kings.

Frk participated in the 2020 AHL All-Star Classic, where he won the hardest shot contest with a 109.2 mph slapshot, breaking Zdeno Chára's record for the fastest shot ever recorded.

As a free agent after three seasons within the Kings organization, Frk was signed to a one-year, two-way contract with the St. Louis Blues on 15 July 2022. In the 2022–23 season, Frk played exclusively with the Blues AHL affiliate, the Springfield Thunderbirds, leading the team in scoring with 30 goals and 64 points through 67 games.

As a pending free agent from the Blues, having played 10 professional seasons in North America, Frk opted to pursue a European career in signing a two-year contract with Swiss club, SC Bern of the National League NL, on 24 April 2023. In the 2023–24 season, Frk opened the campaign with Bern, however after notching 7 points in only 11 games he transferred to fellow Swiss club, SC Rapperswil-Jona Lakers on 9 November 2023. Recruited to the Lakers to provide cover from injuries to Brett Connolly and Emil Djuse, Frk posted 9 points through 22 regular season games.

On 1 July 2024, Frk opted to return to North America and the NHL, securing a one-year, two-way contract with the Calgary Flames. At the conclusion of his contract with the Flames, Frk opted to continue within the organization by signing a one-year extension with AHL affiliate, the Calgary Wranglers, on 4 July 2025.

After two seasons in the AHL with the Wranglers, Frk returned abroad in agreeing to a two-year contract with Chinese outfit, Shanghai Dragons of the KHL, on 6 July 2026.

== International play ==
Frk represented the Czech Republic at the 2010 IIHF World U18 Championships. Frk shared the team lead in points for the sixth-place Czechs at the U18 WJC with two goals and five assists in six games.

Frk represented the Czech Republic at the 2011 World Junior Ice Hockey Championships and 2011 IIHF World U18 Championships. At the U20 WJC, Frk led all players in the tournament with 31 penalty minutes and was the seventh-place Czech team's second-leading scorer with three goals and three assists in six games. Frk and Dmitri Jaškin were the leading scorers for the Czechs at the U18 WJC with five points each. Frk scored one goal and four assists as the Czechs finished eighth.

Frk represented the Czech Republic at the 2013 World Junior Ice Hockey Championships. At the WJHC, Frk recorded three goals and one assist in six games.

In December 2023, Frk was suspended 6 games by the Swiss National League after allegedly kicking his opponent, Lawrence Pilut, twice in the head/neck area. This incident came less than 2 months after the death of Adam Johnson, which was caused by an opponent, Matt Petgrave, slitting his throat with a skate blade. There has been much public outcry that Frk should be suspended for life and charged with attempted murder. In an attempt to hide from public repercussions, Frk turned off the comments on his Instagram account.

== Career statistics ==
=== Regular season and playoffs ===
			Regular season					Playoffs
Season	Team	League	GP	G	A	Pts	PIM	GP	G	A	Pts	PIM
2007–08	HC Energie Karlovy Vary	CZE U18	44	25	17	42	56	2	1	0	1	4
2008–09	HC Energie Karlovy Vary	CZE U18	22	26	12	38	85	—	—	—	—	—
2008–09	HC Energie Karlovy Vary	CZE U20	16	8	12	20	6	—	—	—	—	—
2009–10	HC Energie Karlovy Vary	CZE U18	8	9	4	13	41	—	—	—	—	—
2009–10	HC Energie Karlovy Vary	CZE U20	41	28	30	58	186	6	2	3	5	4
2010–11	Halifax Mooseheads	QMJHL	62	22	28	50	75	4	0	2	2	8
2011–12	Halifax Mooseheads	QMJHL	34	16	13	29	41	17	5	6	11	26
2012–13	Halifax Mooseheads	QMJHL	56	35	49	84	84	17	13	20	33	32
2013–14	Toledo Walleye	ECHL	15	5	8	13	10	—	—	—	—	—
2013–14	Grand Rapids Griffins	AHL	50	3	9	12	22	4	0	0	0	0
2014–15	Toledo Walleye	ECHL	29	23	15	38	16	3	2	0	2	4
2014–15	Grand Rapids Griffins	AHL	32	6	6	12	16	2	0	2	2	0
2015–16	Grand Rapids Griffins	AHL	67	27	17	44	89	4	1	3	4	2
2016–17	Carolina Hurricanes	NHL	2	0	0	0	0	—	—	—	—	—
2016–17	Grand Rapids Griffins	AHL	65	27	23	50	58	16	5	10	15	20
2017–18	Detroit Red Wings	NHL	68	11	14	25	14	—	—	—	—	—
2018–19	Detroit Red Wings	NHL	30	1	5	6	4	—	—	—	—	—
2018–19	Grand Rapids Griffins	AHL	13	5	9	14	6	3	1	2	3	16
2019–20	Ontario Reign	AHL	37	23	13	36	59	—	—	—	—	—
2019–20	Los Angeles Kings	NHL	17	6	2	8	4	—	—	—	—	—
2020–21	Los Angeles Kings	NHL	1	0	0	0	0	—	—	—	—	—
2020–21	Ontario Reign	AHL	14	6	6	12	12	1	1	0	1	0
2021–22	Ontario Reign	AHL	58	40	33	73	73	5	2	3	5	24
2021–22	Los Angeles Kings	NHL	6	2	0	2	2	—	—	—	—	—
2022–23	Springfield Thunderbirds	AHL	67	30	34	64	68	2	0	0	0	0
2023–24	SC Bern	NL	11	3	4	7	4	—	—	—	—	—
2023–24	SC Rapperswil-Jona Lakers	NL	22	4	5	9	6	—	—	—	—	—
2024–25	Calgary Wranglers	AHL	67	27	33	60	62	2	0	2	2	8
2025–26	Calgary Wranglers	AHL	66	30	30	60	70	—	—	—	—	—
NHL totals			124	20	21	41	24	—	—	—	—	—

=== International ===
Year	Team	Event	Result	GP	G	A	Pts	PIM
2010	Czech Republic	U18	6th	6	2	5	7	6
2011	Czech Republic	WJC	7th	6	3	3	6	31
2011	Czech Republic	U18	8th	6	1	4	5	2
2013	Czech Republic	WJC	5th	6	3	1	4	16
Junior totals				24	9	13	22	55

== Awards and honours ==
Award	Year	Ref
CHL
Memorial Cup All-Star Team	2013	
AHL
Calder Cup champion	2017	
Second All-Star Team	2022	
