= Zimni stadion =

Zimni stadion: Czech: Zimní stadion; Slovak: Zimný štadión; Russian: Зимний стадион, romanized Zimniy stadion — in Slavic languages, an indoor sporting arena, usually (but not necessarily exclusively) used for sporting events. Literally meaning Winter Stadium, the name can be interpreted in two ways — as a venue for competitions in summer sports in winter, or as a venue for competitions and training in winter sports.

== Czech Republic ==
- Zimní stadion Havířov — in Havířov (opened in 1950)
- Zimní stadion Karlovy Vary — in Karlovy Vary (opened in 1947)
- Městský zimní stadion — in Kladno
- Zimní Stadion, or Metrostav Aréna — in Mladá Boleslav (opened in 1956)
- Zimní stadion Opava — in Opava (opened in 1953, roofed in 1956)
- Zimní stadion Přerov — in Přerov (opened in 1971)
- Třinecký Zimní Stadion, or Werk Arena — in Třinec (opened in 1967, roofed in 1976)
- Zimní stadion Na Lapači — in Vsetín (opened in 1966)
- Zimní stadion Luďka Čajky — in Zlín (opened in 1957)

== Slovakia ==
- Zimný štadión Liptovský Mikuláš — in Liptovský Mikuláš (opened in 1949)

== Russia ==
- Zimniy Stadion (Petersburg) — in Saint Petersburg (opened in 1949 in Leningrad)
