= Zimní stadion Karlovy Vary =

Ice hockey arena

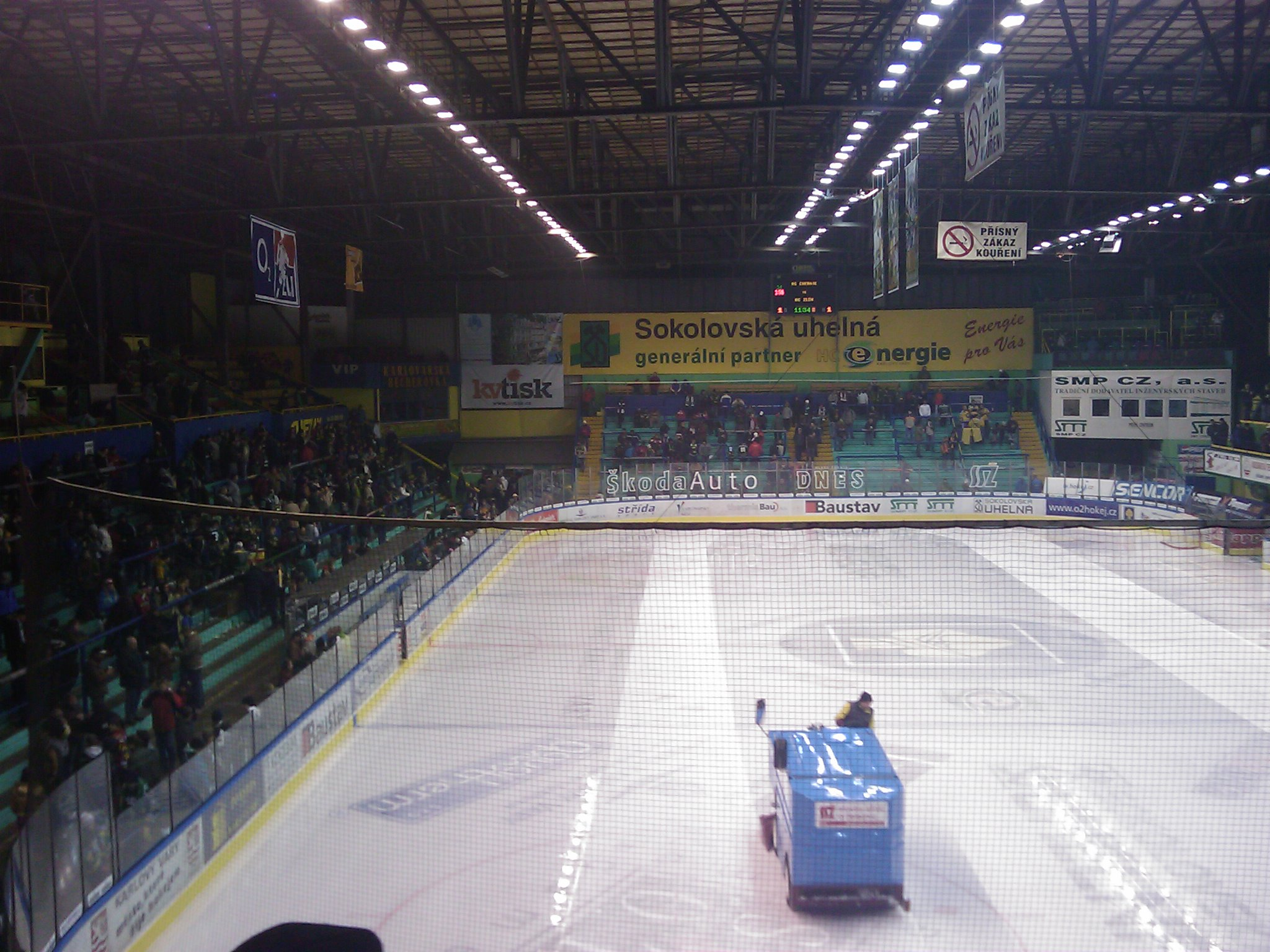
- Interactive map of Zimní stadion Karlovy Vary
- Location: Karlovy Vary, Czech Republic 360 05
- Coordinates: 50°13′52.83″N 12°51′07.20″E
- Owner: HC Energie Karlovy Vary s.r.o.
- Capacity: 4,680

Construction
- Opened: 1947
- Closed: 2009

Tenant
- HC Energie Karlovy Vary (1947–2009)

Zimní stadion Karlovy Vary was an indoor sporting arena located in Karlovy Vary, Czech Republic. Built in 1947, the capacity of the arena was 4,680 people (including 1,480 seated). The arena was covered from the 1980s. It was to home HC Energie Karlovy Vary ice hockey team until the club won the Czech Extraliga in 2009. It was then replaced by the KV Arena in 2009.
