= Pavel Kuběna =

Czech ice hockey player

- Born: April 1, 1988 (age 38) Blansko, Czechoslovakia
- Height: 5 ft 10 in (178 cm)
- Weight: 179 lb (81 kg; 12 st 11 lb)
- Position: Right wing
- Shoots: Right
- Czech 2.liga team Former teams: Mostečtí Lvi; HC Karlovy Vary; HC Košice
- Playing career: 2005–present

Pavel Kuběna (born April 1, 1988) is a former Czech professional ice hockey right winger.

Kuběna previously played 140 games in the Czech Extraliga for HC Karlovy Vary. He also played with HC Košice in the Slovak Extraliga during the 2012–13 Slovak Extraliga season.
