= Patriot Budapest =

Hungarian ice hockey team

- City: Budapest, Hungary
- League: Minor Hockey League; 2012-2013
- Founded: 2012
- Colors
- Owner(s): Skoda Export
- General manager: Radim Dvořák
- Head coach: Artur Oktyabrev
- Website: PatriotHockey.eu

Franchise history
- Patriot Budapest: 2012–present

Patriot Budapest was an ice hockey club, based in Budapest, Hungary. It was founded in 2012. The club joined the Minor Hockey League, the Eurasian Minor Hockey League in the 2012–2013 season, only to withdraw early into the 2013-2014 season.

== MHL Games 2012–13 ==
=== September 2012 ===
	Day	Date	Home	Host	Score	Periods
1.	Sun	02. 09. 2012	(Czech Republic) Energie Karlovy Vary	(Hungary) Patriot	4 : 1	1:0, 3:1, 0:0
2.	Mon	03. 09. 2012	(Czech Republic) Energie Karlovy Vary	(Hungary) Patriot	4 : 0	1:0, 1:0, 2:0
3.	Mon	10. 09. 2012	(Hungary) Patriot	(Russia) Loko Yaroslavl	3 : 1	0:1, 1:0, 2:0
4.	Tue	11. 09. 2012	(Hungary) Patriot	(Russia) Loko Yaroslavl	1 : 2 SO	0:1, 0:0, 1:0 + 0:0, 0:1
5.	Thu	13. 09. 2012	(Hungary) Patriot	(Russia) Serebr. Lvy St. Petersburg	5 : 6 SO	1:0, 2:4, 2:1 + 0:0, 0:1
6.	Fri	14. 09. 2012	(Hungary) Patriot	(Russia) Serebr. Lvy St. Petersburg	4 : 5 OT	2:1, 1:1, 1:2 + 0:1
7.	Wed	19. 09. 2012	(Russia) Atlanty Mytishchi	(Hungary) Patriot	4 : 3	2:0, 2:3, 0:0
8.	Thu	20. 09. 2012	(Russia) Atlanty Mytishchi	(Hungary) Patriot	1 : 2	1:1, 0:0, 0:1
9.	Sat	22. 09. 2012	(Russia) HC MVD Balashikha	(Hungary) Patriot	5 : 8	3:3, 2:2, 0:3
10.	Sun	23. 09. 2012	(Russia) HC MVD Balashikha	(Hungary) Patriot	2 : 1 SO	1:1, 0:0, 0:0 + 0:0, 1:0
11.	Thu	27. 09. 2012	(Hungary) Patriot	(Russia) Kapitan Stupino	4 : 3	2:1, 0:0, 2:2
12.	Fri	28. 09. 2012	(Hungary) Patriot	(Russia) Kapitan Stupino	3 : 1	0:0, 2:1, 1:0
13.	Sun	30. 09. 2012	(Hungary) Patriot	(Russia) Russkie Vityazi Chekhov	1 : 2 OT	0:1, 0:0, 1:0 + 0:1

=== October 2012 ===
	Day	Date	Home	Host	Score	Periods
14.	Mon	01. 10. 2012	(Hungary) Patriot	(Russia) Russkie Vityazi Chekhov	2 : 3	1:3, 0:0, 1:0
15.	Fri	05. 10. 2012	(Russia) Almaz Cherepovets	(Hungary) Patriot	5 : 0	1:0, 2:0, 2:0
16.	Sat	06. 10. 2012	(Russia) Almaz Cherepovets	(Hungary) Patriot	4 : 3	2:1, 1:2, 1:0
17.	Sun	08. 10. 2012	(Russia) SKA-1946 St. Petersburg	(Hungary) Patriot	5 : 1	1:1, 3:0, 1:0
18.	Mon	09. 10. 2012	(Russia) SKA-1946 St. Petersburg	(Hungary) Patriot	4 : 3 SO	1:0, 2:3, 1:1 + 0:0, 1:0
19.	Sat	13. 10. 2012	(Hungary) Patriot	(Russia) MHK Spartak Moscow	1 : 8	0:2, 0:2, 1:4
20.	Sun	14. 10. 2012	(Hungary) Patriot	(Russia) MHK Spartak Moscow	1 : 6	0:4, 0:0, 1:2
21.	Tue	16. 10. 2012	(Hungary) Patriot	(Russia) MHK Khimik Voskresensk	2 : 1	0:0, 1:1, 1:0
22.	Wed	17. 10. 2012	(Hungary) Patriot	(Russia) MHK Khimik Voskresensk	4 : 3	1:0, 3:1, 0:2
23.	Sat	20. 10. 2012	(Russia) Krasnaya Armiya Moscow	(Hungary) Patriot	6 : 1	1:0, 2:0, 3:1
24.	Sun	21. 10. 2012	(Russia) Krasnaya Armiya Moscow	(Hungary) Patriot	5 : 2	2:0, 2:1, 1:1
25.	Tue	23. 10. 2012	(Latvia) HK Riga	(Hungary) Patriot	3 : 1	1:0, 2:0, 0:1
26.	Wed	24. 10. 2012	(Latvia) HK Riga	(Hungary) Patriot	7 : 1	3:0, 0:0, 4:1
27.	Wed	31. 10. 2012	(Hungary) Patriot	(Russia) Amurskie Tigry Khabarovsk	1 : 4	0:1, 0:2, 1:1

=== November 2012 ===
	Day	Date	Home	Host	Score	Periods
28.	Thu	01. 11. 2012	(Hungary) Patriot	(Russia) Amurskie Tigry Khabarovsk	3 : 5	0:0, 0:3, 3:2
29.	Thu	15. 11. 2012	(Belarus) Dinamo-Shinnik Babruysk	(Hungary) Patriot	3 : 1	0:1, 2:0, 1:0
30.	Fri	16. 11. 2012	(Belarus) Dinamo-Shinnik Babruysk	(Hungary) Patriot	3 : 2	2:0, 1:2, 0:0
31.	Sun	18. 11. 2012	(Belarus) Yunost Minsk	(Hungary) Patriot	3 : 4	0:1, 2:1, 1:2
32.	Mon	19. 11. 2012	(Belarus) Yunost Minsk	(Hungary) Patriot	4 : 1	: : :
33.	Wed	21. 11. 2012	(Hungary) Patriot	(Belarus) Dinamo-Shinnik Babruysk	1 : 5	: : :
34.	Fri	23. 11. 2012	(Hungary) Patriot	(Belarus) Dinamo-Shinnik Babruysk	1 : 8	: : :
35.	Tue	27. 11. 2012	(Hungary) Patriot	(Belarus) Yunost Minsk	5 : 4	: : :
36.	Wed	28. 11. 2012	(Hungary) Patriot	(Belarus) Yunost Minsk	1 : 0	: : :

=== December 2012 ===
	Day	Date	Home	Host	Score	Periods
37.	Mon	03. 12. 2012	(Russia) Amurskie Tigry Khabarovsk	(Hungary) Patriot	2 : 3 OT	1:1, 0:0, 1:1 + 0:1
38.	Tue	04. 12. 2012	(Russia) Amurskie Tigry Khabarovsk	(Hungary) Patriot	2 : 0	0:0, 0:0, 2:0

=== January 2013 ===
	Day	Date	Home	Host	Score	Periods
39.	Fri	11. 01. 2013	(Hungary) Patriot	(Latvia) HK Riga	:	: : :
40.	Sat	12. 01. 2013	(Hungary) Patriot	(Latvia) HK Riga	:	: : :
41.	Mon	14. 01. 2013	(Hungary) Patriot	(Russia) Krasnaya Armiya Moscow	:	: : :
42.	Tue	15. 01. 2013	(Hungary) Patriot	(Russia) Krasnaya Armiya Moscow	:	: : :
43.	Sun	20. 01. 2013	(Russia) MHK Khimik Voskresensk	(Hungary) Patriot	:	: : :
44.	Mon	21. 01. 2013	(Russia) MHK Khimik Voskresensk	(Hungary) Patriot	:	: : :
45.	Thu	24. 01. 2013	(Russia) MHK Spartak	(Hungary) Patriot	:	: : :
46.	Fri	25. 01. 2013	(Russia) MHK Spartak	(Hungary) Patriot	:	: : :
47.	Mon	28. 01. 2013	(Hungary) Patriot	(Russia) SKA-1946 St. Petersburg	:	: : :
48.	Tue	29. 01. 2013	(Hungary) Patriot	(Russia) SKA-1946 St. Petersburg	:	: : :
49.	Thu	31. 01. 2013	(Hungary) Patriot	(Russia) Almaz Cherepovets	:	: : :

=== February 2013 ===
	Day	Date	Home	Host	Score	Periods
50.		01 Feb 2013	(Hungary) Patriot	(Russia) Almaz Cherepovets	:	: : :
51.		04 Feb 2013	(Russia) Russkie Vityazi Chekhov	(Hungary) Patriot	:	: : :
52.		05 Feb 2013	(Russia) Russkie Vityazi Chekhov	(Hungary) Patriot	:	: : :
53.		07 Feb 2013	(Russia) Kapitan Stupino	(Hungary) Patriot	:	: : :
54.		08 Feb 2013	(Russia) Kapitan Stupino	(Hungary) Patriot	:	: : :
55.		14 Feb 2013	(Hungary) Patriot	(Russia) Atlanty Mytishchi	:	: : :
56.		15 Feb 2013	(Hungary) Patriot	(Russia) Atlanty Mytishchi	:	: : :
57.		17 Feb 2013	(Hungary) Patriot	(Russia) HC MVD Balashikha	:	: : :
58.		18 Feb 2013	(Hungary) Patriot	(Russia) HC MVD Balashikha	:	: : :
59.	Mon	25 Feb 2013	(Russia) Loko Yaroslavl	(Hungary) Patriot	7 : 1	2:0, 2:1, 3:0
60.	Tue	26 Feb 2013	(Russia) Loko Yaroslavl	(Hungary) Patriot	6 : 2	0:0, 3:0. 3:2
61.	Thu	28 Feb 2013	(Russia) Serebr. Lvy St. Petersburg	(Hungary) Patriot	:	: : :

=== March 2013 ===
	Day	Date	Home	Host	Score	Periods
62.	Fri	01. 03. 2013	(Russia) Serebr. Lvy St. Petersburg	(Hungary) Patriot	:	: : :
63.	Thu	07. 03. 2013	(Hungary) Patriot	(Czech Republic) Energie Karlovy Vary	:	: : :
64.	Fri	08. 03. 2013	(Hungary) Patriot	(Czech Republic) Energie Karlovy Vary	:	: : :
