= Ondřej Dlapa =

Czech ice hockey player

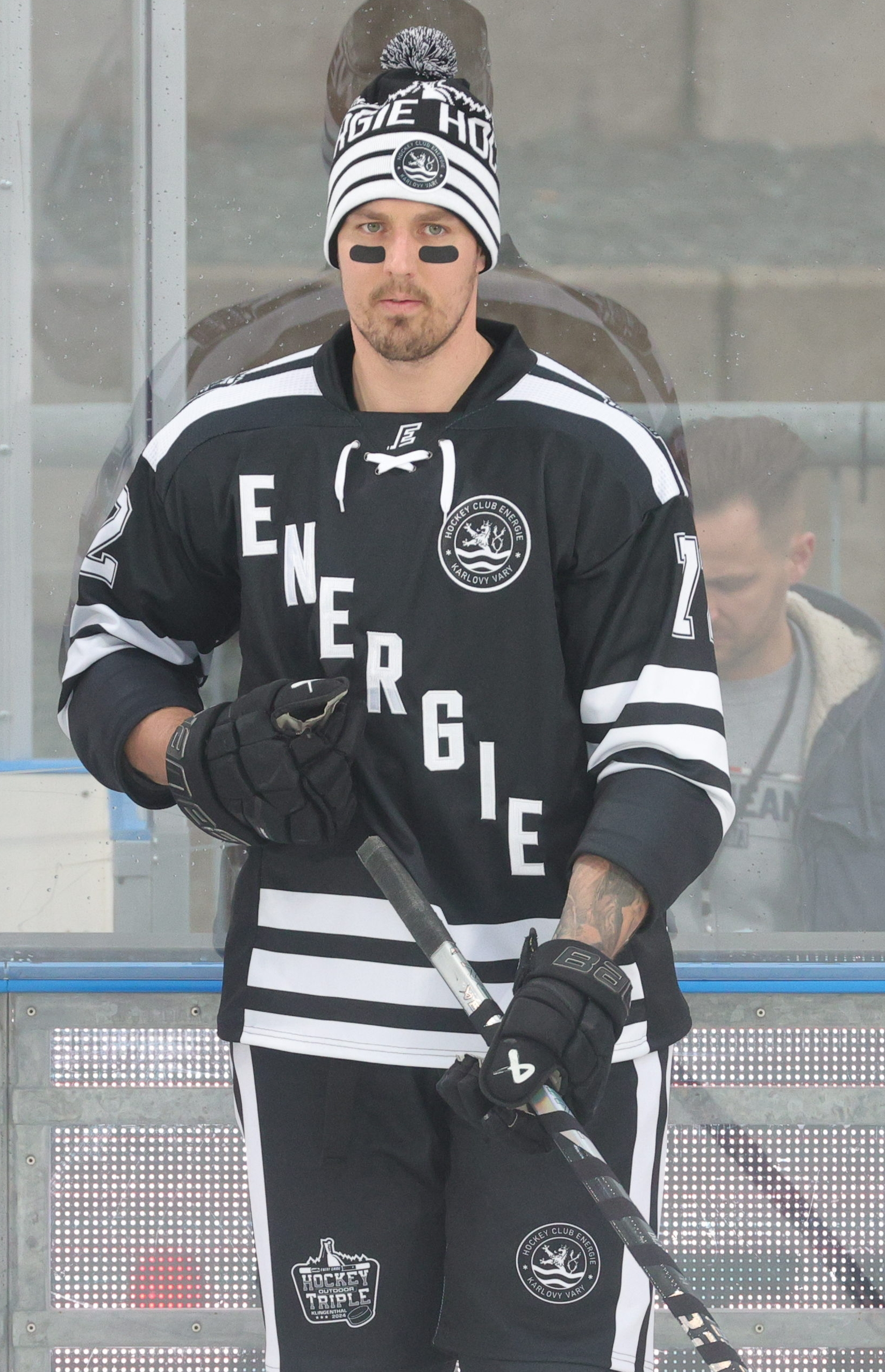
- Dlapa in 2024
- Born: November 12, 1991 (age 34) Brno, Czechoslovakia
- Height: 6 ft 6 in (198 cm)
- Weight: 220 lb (100 kg; 15 st 10 lb)
- Position: Defence
- Shoots: Left
- Czech Extraliga team: HC Energie Karlovy Vary
- Playing career: 2011–present

Ondřej Dlapa (born November 12, 1991) is a Czech professional ice hockey defenceman. He played with HC Kometa Brno in the Czech Extraliga during the 2010–11 Czech Extraliga playoffs.

Now, he plays for the HC Energie Karlovy Vary.
