= Martin Osmík =

Czech ice hockey player

- Born: April 7, 1996 (age 30) Chrudim, Czech Republic
- Height: 6 ft 2 in (188 cm)
- Weight: 187 lb (85 kg; 13 st 5 lb)
- Position: Forward
- Shoots: Left
- ELH team (P) Cur. team: HC Karlovy Vary; HC Baník Sokolov (Chance Liga)
- Playing career: 2015–present

Martin Osmík (born April 7, 1996) is a Czech professional ice hockey forward. He is currently playing for HC Baník Sokolov of the Chance Liga on loan from HC Karlovy Vary.

Osmík made his Czech Extraliga debut for Karlovy Vary during the 2014–15 season, playing two games during the Relegation Round. He has also had season long loan spells with SK Kadaň in the 2016–17 season and HC Dukla Jihlava in the 2018–19 season.

Osmík signed an extension with Karlovy Vary on April 21, 2020 but after just one game he was loaned out again to HC Baník Sokolov.
