= Martin Rohan =

Czech ice hockey player

- Born: June 26, 1990 (age 35) Sokolov, Czechoslovakia
- Height: 5 ft 10 in (178 cm)
- Weight: 181 lb (82 kg; 12 st 13 lb)
- Position: Defence
- Shoots: Left
- Czech Extraliga team: HC Karlovy Vary
- Playing career: 2010–present

Martin Rohan (born June 26, 1990) is a Czech professional ice hockey defenceman for HC Karlovy Vary in the Czech Extraliga.

Rohan made his debut for Karlovy Vary during the 2010–11 Czech Extraliga season. He has also played on loan with HC Baník Sokolov, HC Most and SK Kadaň.

His older brother Tomáš Rohan is also a professional ice hockey player.
