= Adam Rulík =

Czech ice hockey player

- Born: November 13, 1996 (age 29) Ostrov, Czech Republic
- Height: 6 ft 2 in (188 cm)
- Weight: 196 lb (89 kg; 14 st 0 lb)
- Position: Defence
- Shoots: Left
- ELH team (P) Cur. team: HC Karlovy Vary; HC Baník Sokolov (Chance Liga)
- Playing career: 2015–present

Adam Rulík (born November 13, 1996) is a Czech professional ice hockey defenceman. He is currently playing for HC Baník Sokolov of the Chance Liga on loan from HC Karlovy Vary.

Rulík began playing with Karlovy Vary's academy in 2010 and made his senior debut with the team in 2017. After spending the 2018–19 season on loan at HC Stadion Litoměřice in the Chance Liga and HC Baník Sokolov in the Czech 2. liga, Rulík made his Czech Extraliga debut with Karlovy Vary, playing one game during the 2019–20 season before returning to Baník Sokolov on loan. On May 1, 2020, Baník Sokolov extended the loan of Rulík.
