= Vladislav Habal =

Czech ice hockey goaltender

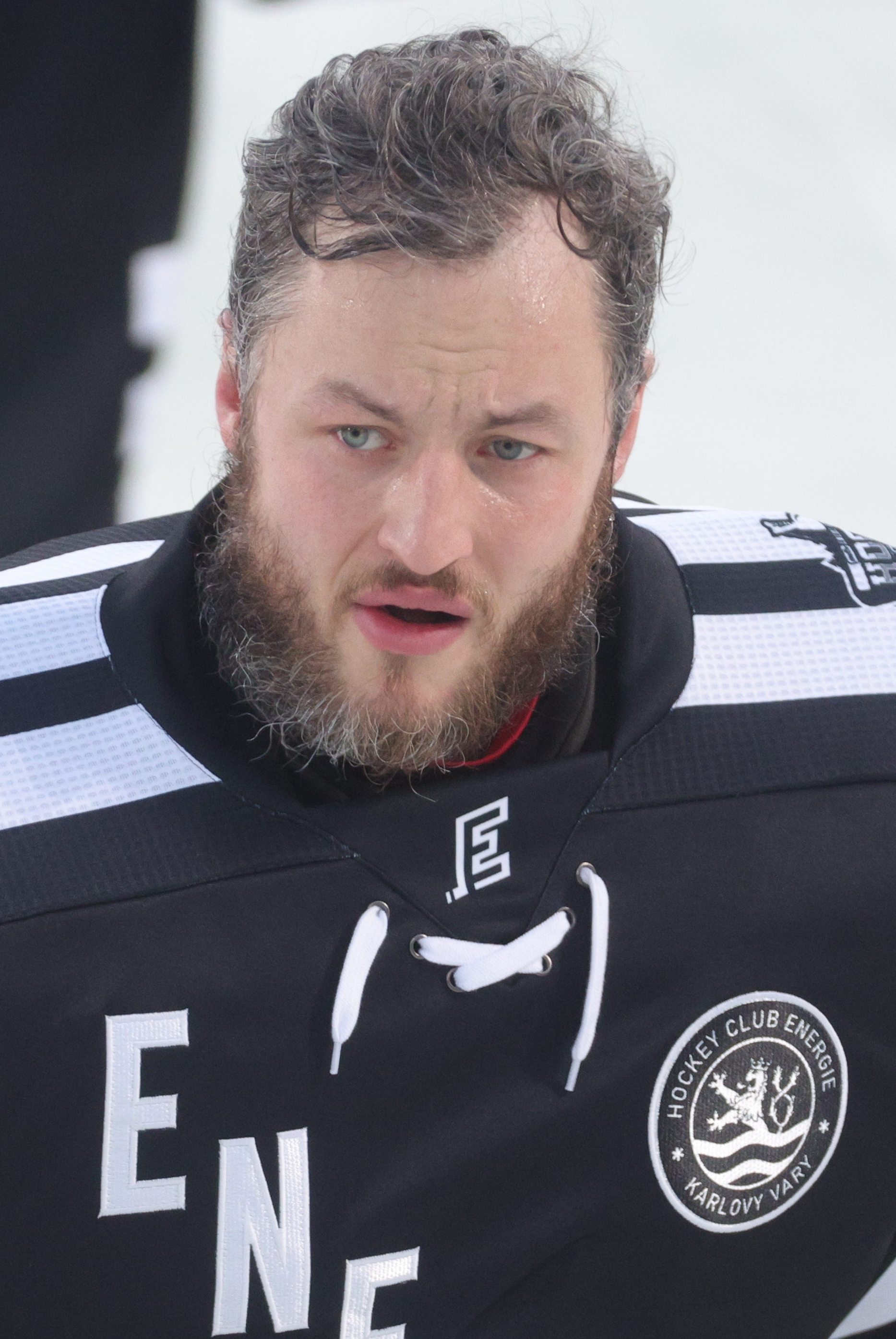
- Habal in 2024
- Born: April 2, 1991 (age 35) Sokolov, Czechoslovakia
- Height: 6 ft 0 in (183 cm)
- Weight: 187 lb (85 kg; 13 st 5 lb)
- Position: Goaltender
- Catches: Right
- Maxa liga team Former teams: HC Baník Sokolov; HC Karlovy Vary; HC Košice; HC Slovan Bratislava
- Playing career: 2010–present

Vladislav Habal (born April 2, 1991) is a Czech professional ice hockey goaltender who plays for HC Baník Sokolov of the 1st Czech Republic Hockey League.

Habal previously played 43 games in the Czech Extraliga for HC Karlovy Vary from 2013 to 2016. He then moved to Slovakia to sign for HC Košice on June 6, 2016. After three seasons with Košice, Habal joined fellow Tipsport Liga side HC Slovan Bratislava on July 21, 2019.
