= Mattoni Arena =

Indoor ice hockey rink in Karlovy Vary, Czech Republic

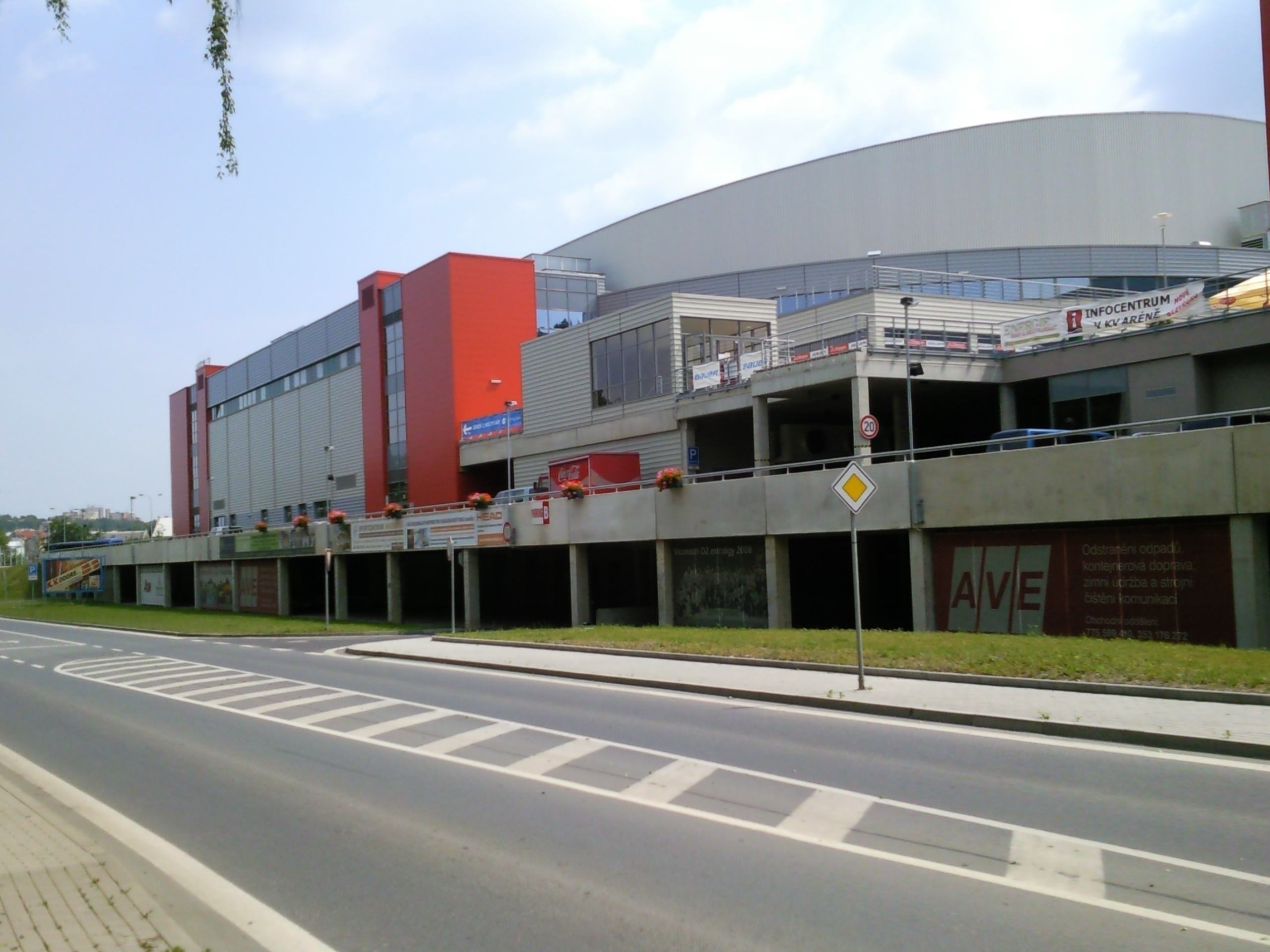
- Interactive map of Mattoni Arena
- Former names: KV Arena (2009–2025)
- Location: Západní 1812/73, Karlovy Vary, Czech Republic 360 01
- Coordinates: 50°13′28″N 12°50′40″E
- Owner: KV Arena, s.r.o.
- Capacity: 7,500 (maximum); 5,874 (ice hockey)

Construction
- Opened: 19 June 2009
- Cost: 1.5 billion CZK

Tenant
- HC Energie Karlovy Vary

Mattoni Arena (formerly known as KV Arena) is an indoor sporting arena located in Karlovy Vary, Czech Republic, which opened on 19 June 2009. The maximum capacity of the arena is 7,500 people, or 5,874 seating people for ice hockey matches. It is currently home to the HC Energie Karlovy Vary ice hockey team.

KV Arena comprises 4 interconnecting halls: Multi-purpose Hall (Main Hall), Training Hall, Ball Sports Hall and Swimming Pool.
