= HC Energie Karlovy Vary =

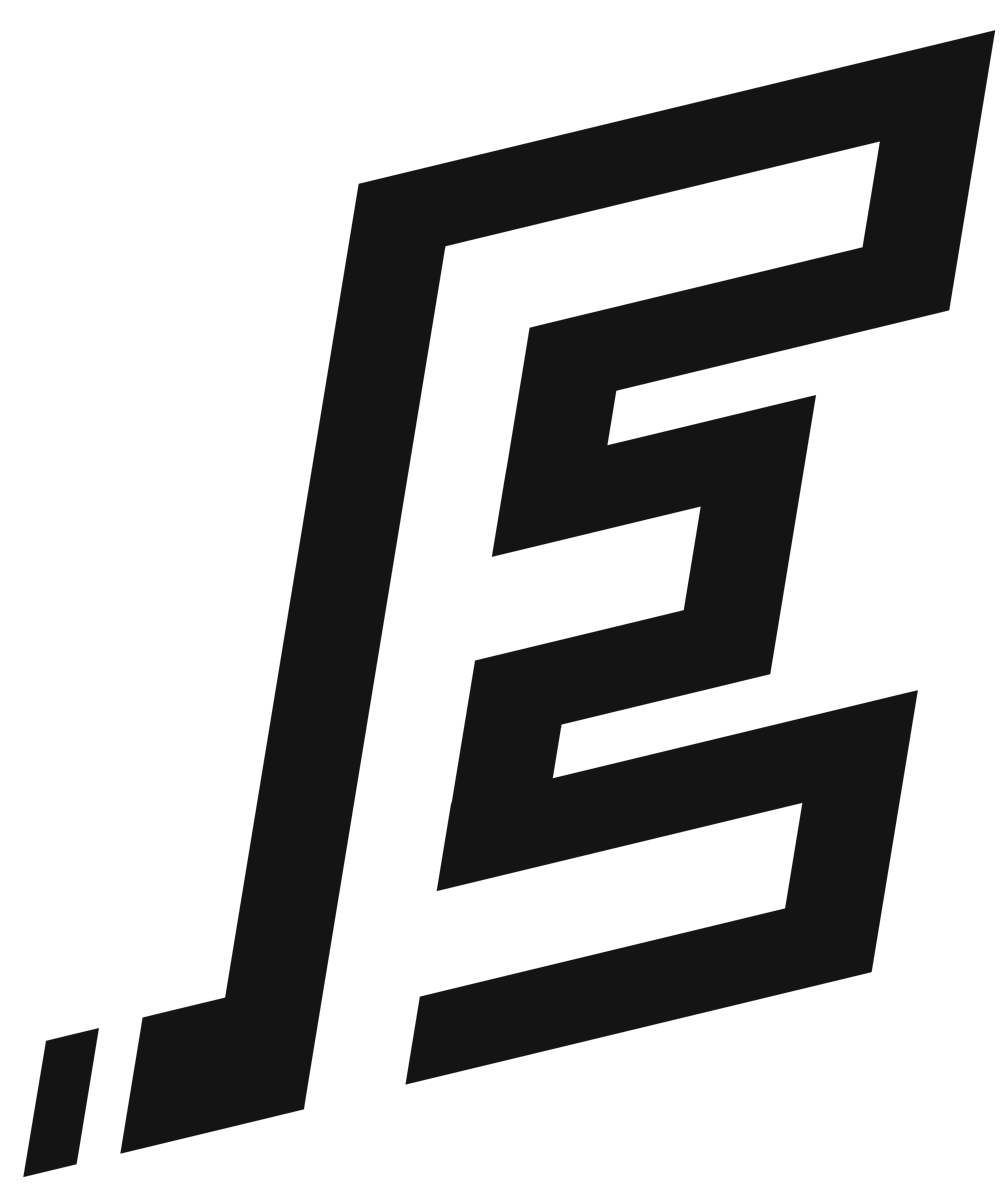
- City: Karlovy Vary, Czech Republic
- League: Czech Extraliga
- Founded: 1932
- Home arena: KV Arena (capacity: 5,874)
- Colours: Black, white, grey, gold
- Owner: (Czech Republic) Karel Holoubek
- General manager: (Czech Republic) Karel Holoubek
- Head coach: (Czech Republic) Pavel Patera
- Website: hokejkv.cz

Franchise history
- HC Energie Karlovy Vary 2002–present: HC Becherovka Karlovy Vary 1994–2002; Slavia Karlovy Vary 1964–1994; Dynamo Karlovy Vary 1953–1964; Sokol Slavia Karlovy Vary 1951–1953; Slavia Karlovy Vary 1932–1951

HC Energie Karlovy Vary is a professional ice hockey team based in Karlovy Vary, Czech Republic. They play in the highest-level national league, the Czech Extraliga.

== The club ==
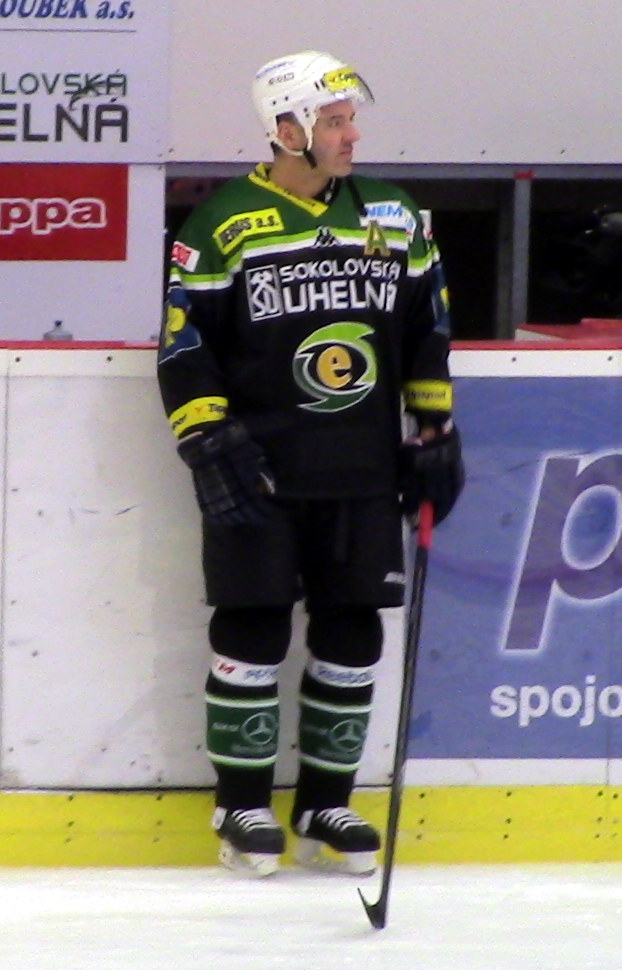
David Hruška

The history of the ice hockey in Karlovy Vary dates back to the 1932, when a few enthusiasts established SK Slavia Karlovy Vary. The home arena of this club was a small lake nicknamed Little Versailles. In 1948, an artificial ice rink was built, which significantly improved the standards. Within a few years, the ice hockey team Karlovy Vary was competing on a national level. The club steadily remained in the first league (Přebor republiky) in the years 1951–52, 1952–53, 1953–54, 1954–55. The numbers of spectators coming to the games in those days were up to and over 10 000. In 1953 the team's name changed to 'Dynamo'. One of the greatest achievements of those days can be considered the games with HK Lokomotiv Moscow which ended 2:3 for Dynamo, or victory 8:5 against the Czechoslovak National Team (which was training for the World Championships). Many key players were injured during the season 1954–55 and the club got relegated to the second league. However, as dominant as Dynamo was in the second league, they never managed to get back to the top league. The team was renamed back to Slavia in 1965. As harsh times came at the end of the 70s when the arena started to fall into disrepair and was not fit for purpose any more, the council decided to build two ice rinks. The construction of the first, training rink commenced shortly and was completed in 1975. The project to build the arena of national standards next to the training ground was never realized. The existing ice rink had the roof put on by the end of 80s. In 1990, changing rooms were built and further improvements were carried out such as new services, cooling of the surface, barriers with artificial glass, etc. Basically everything that was missing right from the start. A large financial burden and no interest of the local council caused that the club was relegated to the division group (note: 1) Extraliga ('Extra League'), 2) 1. liga ('First League'), 3) 2.liga ('Second League'), 4) krajské přebory ('Division'). All changed in 1991 with a new management and generous sponsor: firm Jan Becher. From the season 1993/1994, the team's name was changed to HC Slavia Becherovka Karlovy Vary (from season 1996/1997 HC Becherovka Karlovy Vary). The club reached the First League in 1995 and a couple of years later in 1997, HC Becherovka Karlovy Vary fought their way into the Extra League. They did not managed to defeat Opava in the playoffs, but with a stable position in the competition, the club bought the rights of HC Olomouc which was in financial difficulties. The club got a new sponsor in 2002, the Sokolovskou uhelnou a. s., and was renamed to HC Energie. In season 2007/2008, the team, led by coach Zdeňek Venera, fought their way into the finals, but lost in a 7-games battle to Prague's team Slavia.

The club's effort paid off next year under the coach Josef Paleček and captain Václav Skuhravy in repetition of last year's finals, HC Energie won 4:2 on games and celebrated their first Extraliga title. The best player of the playoffs that year was Lukáš Mensator. The Extraliga Finals of the 2008/2009 season was also the last game in the old arena in Dolní Kamenna. From the next season, the club moved into the newly built KV Arena.

Some of the icons of ice hockey in Karlovy Vary are Václav Šinágl, Lukáš Mensator and Tomáš Vokoun.

Energie's junior team joined the MHL, the KHL's junior league, for the 2012–13 season, but then left after the 2014–15 season.

In 2017, the team lost the main sponsor Sokolovská uhelná and played the season 2017–18 in the second highest league. The next year, however, the team returned to the Extraliga.

== Honours ==
=== Domestic ===
Czech Extraliga

- (gold) Winners (1): 2008–09
- (silver) Runners-up (1): 2007–08

Czech 1. Liga

- (gold) Winners (2): 1996–97, 2017–18
- (bronze) 3rd place (1): 1995–96

Czech 2. Liga

- (gold) Winners (1): 1994–95

=== Pre-season ===
Tipsport Hockey Cup

- (silver) Runners-up (1): 2007

== Players ==
=== Current roster ===
Source: hokejkv.czSource: eliteprospects.comAs of July 15, 2023.

No.	Nat	Player	Pos	S/G	Age	Acquired	Birthplace
8	(Czech Republic)	Ondřej Beránek	LW	L	30	2013	Havlíčkův Brod, Czech Republic
21	(Czech Republic)	Jiří Černoch	RW	R	30	2019	Klatovy, Czech Republic
72	(Czech Republic)	Ondřej Dlapa	D	L	34	2021	Brno, Czechoslovakia
–	(Czech Republic)	Dominik Frodl	G	L	30	2023	Prague, Czech Republic
12	(Slovakia)	Dávid Gríger	C	R	31	2021	Poprad, Slovakia
85	(Czech Republic)	Vladislav Habal	G	R	35	2020	Sokolov, Czechoslovakia
77	(Czech Republic)	Tomáš Havlín	D	L	30	2021	Jablonec nad Nisou, Czech Republic
67	(Czech Republic)	Jan Hladonik	LW	L	27	2020	Třinec, Czech Republic
11	(Czech Republic)	Vít Jiskra	LW	L	25	2019	Karlovy Vary, Czech Republic
10	(Czech Republic)	Petr Koblasa	RW	R	32	2019	Soběslav, Czech Republic
64	(Czech Republic)	Martin Kohout	LW	L	31	2014	Rožnov pod Radhoštěm, Czech Republic
29	(Czech Republic)	Štěpán Lukeš	G	R	30	2021	Chomutov, Czech Republic
38	(Canada)	Garrett McFadden	D	L	29	2023	Owen Sound, Ontario, Canada
83	(Czech Republic)	Dalimil Mikyska	D	L	27	2021	Břeclav, Czech Republic
76	(Czech Republic)	Martin Osmík	C	L	30	2014	Chrudim, Czech Republic
7	(Czech Republic)	Michal Plutnar	D	R	32	2017	Chotěboř, Czech Republic
51	(Czech Republic)	Lukáš Pulpán (A)	D	L	41	2020	Plzeň, Czechoslovakia
30	(Czech Republic)	Tomáš Rachůnek (A)	RW	R	35	2020	Zlín, Czechoslovakia
17	(Czech Republic)	Tomáš Redlich	LW	L	33	2020	Kladno, Czech Republic
90	(Czech Republic)	Martin Rohan	D	L	36	2020	Sokolov, Czechoslovakia
20	(Czech Republic)	David Tureček	D	R	25	2018	Kyjov, Czech Republic
44	(Czech Republic)	Petr Vodička	D	L	29	2017	Plzeň, Czech Republic
5	(Czech Republic)	Tomáš Vondráček (C)	LW	L	35	2019	Třebíč, Czechoslovakia
58	(Czech Republic)	Martin Weinhold	D	R	29	2015	Most, Czech Republic

Preceded by HC Slavia Praha	Czech Extraliga Champions; 2008–09	Succeeded by HC Eaton Pardubice
