= Sergei Topol =

Russian ice hockey player

- Born: February 15, 1985 (age 40) Omsk, Russian SFSR, Soviet Union
- Height: 6 ft 1 in (185 cm)
- Weight: 182 lb (83 kg; 13 st 0 lb)
- Position: Left wing
- Shoots: Left
- BHL team Former teams: HK Gomel; Avangard Omsk; Metallurg Novokuznetsk; HC Vityaz; High1
- NHL draft: 252nd overall, 2003; Vancouver Canucks
- Playing career: 2003–present

Sergei Stanislavovich Topol (Russian: Сергей Станиславович Тополь; born February 15, 1985) is a Russian ice hockey forward. He currently plays for HK Gomel of the Belarusian Extraleague.

== Honours ==
- Russian championship: 2004 (With Avangard Omsk)

== Career statistics ==
			Regular season					Playoffs
Season	Team	League	GP	G	A	Pts	PIM	GP	G	A	Pts	PIM
2001–02	Avangard–2 Omsk	RUS.3	24	2	5	7	8	—	—	—	—	—
2002–03	Avangard–2 Omsk	RUS.3	45	16	5	21	18	—	—	—	—	—
2003–04	Avangard Omsk	RSL	9	0	0	0	2	—	—	—	—	—
2003–04	Avangard–2 Omsk	RUS.3	46	27	20	47	18	4	1	0	1	4
2004–05	Mechel Chelyabinsk	RUS.2	19	1	0	1	6	—	—	—	—	—
2004–05	Mechel–2 Chelyabinsk	RUS.3	8	3	1	4	4	—	—	—	—	—
2004–05	Avangard Omsk	RSL	2	1	0	1	0	—	—	—	—	—
2004–05	Avangard–2 Omsk	RUS.3	33	15	13	28	8	—	—	—	—	—
2005–06	Avangard Omsk	RSL	17	1	0	1	12	—	—	—	—	—
2005–06	Avangard–2 Omsk	RUS.3	35	25	16	41	28	—	—	—	—	—
2006–07	Avangard Omsk	RSL	27	0	1	1	12	1	0	0	0	2
2006–07	Avangard–2 Omsk	RUS.3	31	23	18	41	34	—	—	—	—	—
2007–08	Avtomobilist Yekaterinburg	RUS.2	16	0	7	7	10	—	—	—	—	—
2007–08	Avtomobilist–2 Yekaterinburg	RUS.3	6	6	4	10	14	—	—	—	—	—
2007–08	Sputnik Nizhny Tagil	RUS.2	6	1	0	1	0	—	—	—	—	—
2007–08	Sputnik–2 Nizhny Tagil	RUS.3	1	0	0	0	0	—	—	—	—	—
2008–09	Yermak Angarsk	RUS.2	50	17	8	25	38	4	0	1	1	2
2008–09	Yermak–2 Angarsk	RUS.3	1	0	0	0	0	—	—	—	—	—
2009–10	Yermak Angarsk	RUS.2	26	7	19	26	8	—	—	—	—	—
2009–10	Metallurg Novokuznetsk	KHL	22	3	3	6	4	—	—	—	—	—
2010–11	Metallurg Novokuznetsk	KHL	2	0	0	0	0	—	—	—	—	—
2010–11	Yermak Angarsk	VHL	49	18	11	29	36	6	2	1	3	2
2011–12	Mechel Chelyabinsk	VHL	48	21	22	43	26	10	4	2	6	8
2012–13	Molot Perm	VHL	52	22	18	40	22	10	6	5	11	0
2013–14	HC Vityaz	KHL	16	3	2	5	0	—	—	—	—	—
2013–14	Titan Klin	VHL	18	3	3	6	20	4	1	0	1	2
2014–15	Rubin Tyumen	VHL	50	16	14	30	24	7	0	2	2	2
2015–16	Sputnik Nizhny Tagil	VHL	41	15	13	28	24	7	1	1	2	2
2016–17	HK Gomel	BLR	39	24	16	40	22	8	2	2	4	6
2017–18	Saryarka Karagandy	VHL	44	8	16	24	14	6	4	1	5	6
2018–19	High1	ALH	34	12	15	27	12	—	—	—	—	—
2019–20	HK Gomel	BLR	52	16	21	37	14	6	1	1	2	0
2020–21	Metallurg Zhlobin	BLR	39	11	20	31	43	12	3	1	4	2
2021–22	ECDC Memmingen	GER.3	41	23	31	54	12	15	11	6	17	12
RSL totals			55	2	1	3	26	1	0	0	0	2
RUS.2 & VHL totals			419	129	131	260	228	54	18	13	31	24
KHL totals			40	6	5	11	4	—	—	—	—	—
