= Vladislav Yegin =

Russian ice hockey player (1989–2021)

- Born: 13 April 1989 Moscow, Russian SFSR, Soviet Union
- Died: 11 May 2021 (aged 32)
- Height: 6 ft 0 in (183 cm)
- Weight: 223 lb (101 kg; 15 st 13 lb)
- Position: Defence
- Shot: Left
- Played for: HC Spartak Moscow; Neftyanik Leninogorsk; HC Ryazan; Molot-Prikamye Perm; Yermak Angarsk; Donbass Donetsk; Rubin Tyumen; Avtomobilist Yekaterinburg; Sputnik Nizhny Tagil; HC Lipetsk
- NHL draft: Undrafted
- Playing career: 2007–2015

Vladislav Yegin (13 April 1989 – 11 May 2021) was a Russian ice hockey defenceman. Most recently prior to his death, he was playing with Avtomobilist Yekaterinburg of the Kontinental Hockey League (KHL).

== Life and career ==
He made his Kontinental Hockey League debut playing with Avtomobilist Yekaterinburg during the 2013–14 KHL season.

Yegin died from complications of COVID-19 on 11 May 2021, at the age of 32.

== Career statistics ==
			Regular season					Playoffs
Season	Team	League	GP	G	A	Pts	PIM	GP	G	A	Pts	PIM
2004–05	HC Spartak Moscow-2	Russia3	7	0	0	0	0	—	—	—	—	—
2005–06	HC Spartak Moscow-2	Russia3	54	2	10	12	46	—	—	—	—	—
2005–06	SDYUSHOR Spartak Moskva	MosJHL	1	0	0	0	0	—	—	—	—	—
2006–07	HC CSKA Moscow-2	Russia3	70	4	17	21	104	—	—	—	—	—
2006–07	SDYUSHOR CSKA Moskva	MosJHL	1	0	1	1	2	—	—	—	—	—
2007–08	HC Spartak Moscow	Russia	17	0	0	0	6	—	—	—	—	—
2007–08	HC Spartak Moscow-2	Russia3	9	1	2	3	26	—	—	—	—	—
2007–08	Neftyanik Leninogorsk	Russia2	2	0	0	0	2	—	—	—	—	—
2007–08	Neftyanik Leninogorsk-2	Russia3	2	1	0	1	0	—	—	—	—	—
2008–09	HC Ryazan	Russia2	64	6	11	17	86	8	0	1	1	8
2009–10	HC Ryazan	Russia2	48	11	6	17	48	8	1	3	4	43
2009–10	HC Ryazan-2	Russia3	2	0	0	0	0	—	—	—	—	—
2010–11	Molot-Prikamye Perm	VHL	48	4	6	10	26	8	0	2	2	2
2011–12	Yermak Angarsk	VHL	4	1	1	2	0	—	—	—	—	—
2011–12	Donbass Donetsk	VHL	39	3	7	10	34	9	0	1	1	12
2012–13	Rubin Tyumen	VHL	14	0	1	1	8	10	0	2	2	2
2013–14	HC Ryazan	VHL	12	3	2	5	8	—	—	—	—	—
2013–14	Avtomobilist Yekaterinburg	KHL	17	1	2	3	10	—	—	—	—	—
2013–14	Sputnik Nizhny Tagil	VHL	1	0	0	0	0	—	—	—	—	—
2014–15	Avtomobilist Yekaterinburg	KHL	28	2	2	4	10	—	—	—	—	—
2014–15	HC Lipetsk	VHL	5	2	1	3	0	3	0	0	0	0
KHL totals			45	3	4	7	20	—	—	—	—	—
Russia totals			17	0	0	0	6	—	—	—	—	—
VHL totals			123	13	18	31	76	30	0	5	5	16
Russia2 totals			114	17	17	34	136	16	1	4	5	51
