= Denis Stasyuk =

Russian ice hockey player

- Born: September 2, 1985 (age 40) Novokuznetsk. USSR
- Height: 6 ft 3 in (191 cm)
- Weight: 181 lb (82 kg; 12 st 13 lb)
- Position: Forward
- Shoots: Left
- KHL team: Metallurg Novokuznetsk
- NHL draft: 171st overall, 2003; Florida Panthers
- Playing career: 2002–present

Denis Stasyuk (September 2, 1985) is a Russian professional ice hockey winger who currently plays for Metallurg Novokuznetsk of the Kontinental Hockey League (KHL). He was selected by the Florida Panthers in the 6th round (171st overall) of the 2003 NHL entry draft.

== Career statistics ==
			Regular season					Playoffs
Season	Team	League	GP	G	A	Pts	PIM	GP	G	A	Pts	PIM
2001–02	Metallurg–2 Novokuznetsk	RUS.3	26	2	1	3	18	—	—	—	—	—
2002–03	Metallurg Novokuznetsk	RSL	11	1	0	1	0	—	—	—	—	—
2002–03	Metallurg–2 Novokuznetsk	RUS.3	30	7	8	15	4	—	—	—	—	—
2003–04	Metallurg Novokuznetsk	RSL	5	0	0	0	0	—	—	—	—	—
2003–04	Metallurg–2 Novokuznetsk	RUS.3	43	16	17	33	26	—	—	—	—	—
2004–05	Amur Khabarovsk	RUS.2	44	11	10	21	12	10	1	2	3	6
2004–05	Amur–2 Khabarovsk	RUS.3	1	0	0	0	0	—	—	—	—	—
2005–06	Metallurg Novokuznetsk	RSL	41	7	2	9	18	3	0	0	0	0
2005–06	Metallurg–2 Novokuznetsk	RUS.3	6	5	2	7	4	—	—	—	—	—
2006–07	Metallurg Novokuznetsk	RSL	26	0	1	1	16	3	0	0	0	0
2006–07	Metallurg–2 Novokuznetsk	RUS.3	4	2	1	3	12	—	—	—	—	—
2007–08	Metallurg Novokuznetsk	RSL	33	4	2	6	14	—	—	—	—	—
2008–09	Metallurg Novokuznetsk	KHL	44	2	9	11	12	—	—	—	—	—
2009–10	Metallurg Novokuznetsk	KHL	55	8	5	13	12	—	—	—	—	—
2010–11	Metallurg Novokuznetsk	KHL	24	1	0	1	12	—	—	—	—	—
2010–11	Yermak Angarsk	VHL	28	12	6	18	10	8	1	2	3	25
2011–12	Rubin Tyumen	VHL	50	13	18	31	12	19	3	4	7	12
2012–13	Rubin Tyumen	VHL	52	17	14	31	8	12	2	3	5	4
2013–14	Rubin Tyumen	VHL	40	5	12	17	8	6	0	0	0	2
2014–15	Saryarka Karagandy	VHL	20	4	6	10	14	13	4	1	5	0
2015–16	Torpedo Ust–Kamenogorsk	VHL	41	11	10	21	33	6	0	0	0	0
2016–17	Torpedo Ust–Kamenogorsk	VHL	14	1	0	1	0	—	—	—	—	—
2016–17	Amur Khabarovsk	KHL	12	0	0	0	6	—	—	—	—	—
2016–17	Arlan Kokshetau	KAZ	15	5	5	10	6	6	0	1	1	0
2017–18	Kulager Petropavl	KAZ	53	18	17	35	24	7	0	1	1	4
2018–19	Kulager Petropavl	KAZ	54	21	17	38	24	12	4	2	6	4
2019–20	Kulager Petropavl	KAZ	52	30	22	52	6	—	—	—	—	—
2020–21	Kulager Petropavl	KAZ	45	17	18	35	39	4	0	0	0	4
2021–22	Torpedo Ust–Kamenogorsk	KAZ	7	1	0	1	0	—	—	—	—	—
RUS.2 & VHL totals			289	74	76	150	97	74	11	12	23	49
RSL totals			116	12	5	17	48	6	0	0	0	0
KHL totals			135	11	14	25	42	—	—	—	—	—
