= Sergei Ogorodnikov =

Russian ice hockey player (1986–2018)

- Born: 21 January 1986 Irkutsk, Russian SFSR, Soviet Union
- Died: 24 June 2018 (aged 32)
- Height: 5 ft 11 in (180 cm)
- Weight: 187 lb (85 kg; 13 st 5 lb)
- Position: Center
- Shot: Left
- Played for: Avtomobilist Yekaterinburg; Bridgeport Sound Tigers; Dizel Penza; CSKA Moscow; HK Gomel; HC Ryazan; Lada Togliatti; Metallurg Novokuznetsk; Pensacola Ice Pilots; Podhale Nowy Targ; Salavat Yulaev Ufa; Saryarka Karaganda; THK Tver; Yermak Angarsk
- NHL draft: 82nd overall, 2004; New York Islanders
- Playing career: 2003–2018

Sergei Sergeevich Ogorodnikov (Russian: Сергей Сергеевич Огородников; 21 January 1986 – 24 June 2018) was a Russian professional ice hockey center. Ogorodnikov most recently played in Poland with the SSA KH Podhale Nowy Targ of the Polska Hokej Liga. Ogorodnikov died on 24 June 2018 as a result of a jet ski accident.

== Career ==
Ogorodnikov was primarily raised in various Moscow based hockey schools including HC Dynamo Moscow and HC CSKA Moscow. He was also a longtime member of Russia's U20 and U18 national Team Russia squads. The New York Islanders drafted him 82nd overall in the 2004 NHL entry draft. The young forward came over to North America during the summer of 2006. Ogorodnikov returned to Russia after spending one season with the New York Islanders' minor league affiliates in Pensacola (ECHL) and Bridgeport (AHL), where he continued to play before joining SSA KH Podhale Nowy Targ of the Polska Hokej Liga for the 2017-18 season.

== Death ==
Ogorodnikov died as a result of a jet ski accident on 24 June 2018. He was 32 years old.

== Career statistics ==
=== Regular season and playoffs ===
| | | | Regular season | | | | | Playoffs |
| Season | Team | League | GP | G | A | Pts | PIM | GP | G | A | Pts | PIM |
|---|---|---|---|---|---|---|---|---|---|---|---|---|
| 2001–02 | Dynamo–2 Moscow | RUS.3 | 1 | 0 | 0 | 0 | 0 | — | — | — | — | — |
| 2002–03 | Dynamo–2 Moscow | RUS.3 | 16 | 4 | 1 | 5 | 14 | — | — | — | — | — |
| 2003–04 | Dynamo–2 Moscow | RUS.3 | 19 | 5 | 6 | 11 | 42 | — | — | — | — | — |
| 2003–04 | THK Tver | RUS.2 | 21 | 8 | 3 | 11 | 14 | — | — | — | — | — |
| 2004–05 | CSKA Moscow | RSL | 18 | 2 | 4 | 6 | 2 | — | — | — | — | — |
| 2004–05 | CSKA–2 Moscow | RUS.3 | 36 | 15 | 21 | 36 | 16 | — | — | — | — | — |
| 2005–06 | CSKA Moscow | RSL | 3 | 0 | 0 | 0 | 2 | — | — | — | — | — |
| 2005–06 | CSKA–2 Moscow | RUS.3 | 8 | 4 | 5 | 9 | 18 | — | — | — | — | — |
| 2005–06 | Salavat Yulaev Ufa | RSL | 14 | 0 | 3 | 3 | 8 | 6 | 0 | 0 | 0 | 4 |
| 2006–07 | Bridgeport Sound Tigers | AHL | 27 | 3 | 3 | 6 | 10 | — | — | — | — | — |
| 2006–07 | Pensacola Ice Pilots | ECHL | 42 | 18 | 22 | 40 | 30 | — | — | — | — | — |
| 2007–08 | CSKA Moscow | RSL | 4 | 0 | 0 | 0 | 0 | — | — | — | — | — |
| 2007–08 | CSKA–2 Moscow | RUS.3 | 12 | 6 | 15 | 21 | 8 | — | — | — | — | — |
| 2007–08 | Metallurg Novokuznetsk | RSL | 25 | 1 | 1 | 2 | 14 | — | — | — | — | — |
| 2007–08 | Metallurg–2 Novokuznetsk | RUS.3 | 4 | 3 | 2 | 5 | 4 | — | — | — | — | — |
| 2008–09 | Metallurg Novokuznetsk | KHL | 32 | 2 | 2 | 4 | 12 | — | — | — | — | — |
| 2009–10 | HK Gomel | BLR | 41 | 10 | 18 | 28 | 47 | 7 | 1 | 4 | 5 | 0 |
| 2010–11 | HK Gomel | BLR | 34 | 15 | 24 | 39 | 16 | 5 | 1 | 2 | 3 | 0 |
| 2011–12 | Avtomobilist Yekaterinburg | KHL | 31 | 1 | 2 | 3 | 8 | — | — | — | — | — |
| 2012–13 | THK Tver | VHL | 12 | 1 | 1 | 2 | 6 | — | — | — | — | — |
| 2012–13 | Lada Togliatti | VHL | 29 | 7 | 6 | 13 | 16 | 10 | 3 | 1 | 4 | 4 |
| 2013–14 | Lada Togliatti | VHL | 44 | 10 | 10 | 20 | 14 | 5 | 0 | 1 | 1 | 0 |
| 2014–15 | Dizel Penza | VHL | 38 | 11 | 11 | 22 | 20 | — | — | — | — | — |
| 2014–15 | Saryarka Karagandy | VHL | 9 | 1 | 1 | 2 | 4 | 4 | 2 | 0 | 2 | 0 |
| 2015–16 | HC Ryazan | VHL | 28 | 5 | 9 | 14 | 6 | 2 | 0 | 0 | 0 | 0 |
| 2016–17 | HK Gomel | BLR | 12 | 7 | 3 | 10 | 4 | — | — | — | — | — |
| 2016–17 | Yermak Angarsk | VHL | 29 | 5 | 13 | 18 | 6 | 6 | 0 | 3 | 3 | 0 |
| 2017–18 | Podhale Nowy Targ | POL | 36 | 11 | 30 | 41 | 24 | 14 | 9 | 11 | 20 | 6 |
| RUS.2 & VHL totals | | | 210 | 48 | 54 | 102 | 86 | 27 | 5 | 5 | 10 | 4 |
| RSL totals | | | 64 | 3 | 8 | 11 | 26 | 6 | 0 | 0 | 0 | 4 |
| KHL totals | | | 63 | 3 | 4 | 7 | 20 | — | — | — | — | — |

=== International ===
| Year | Team | Event | Result | GP | G | A | Pts | PIM |
|---|---|---|---|---|---|---|---|---|
| 2004 | Russia | WJC18 | 1st place, gold medalist(s) | 6 | 3 | 0 | 3 | 4 |
| 2006 | Russia | WJC | 2nd place, silver medalist(s) | 6 | 0 | 1 | 1 | 6 |
| Junior totals | | | | 12 | 3 | 1 | 4 | 10 |
