= Alexei Tezikov =

Russian ice hockey player (1978–2020)

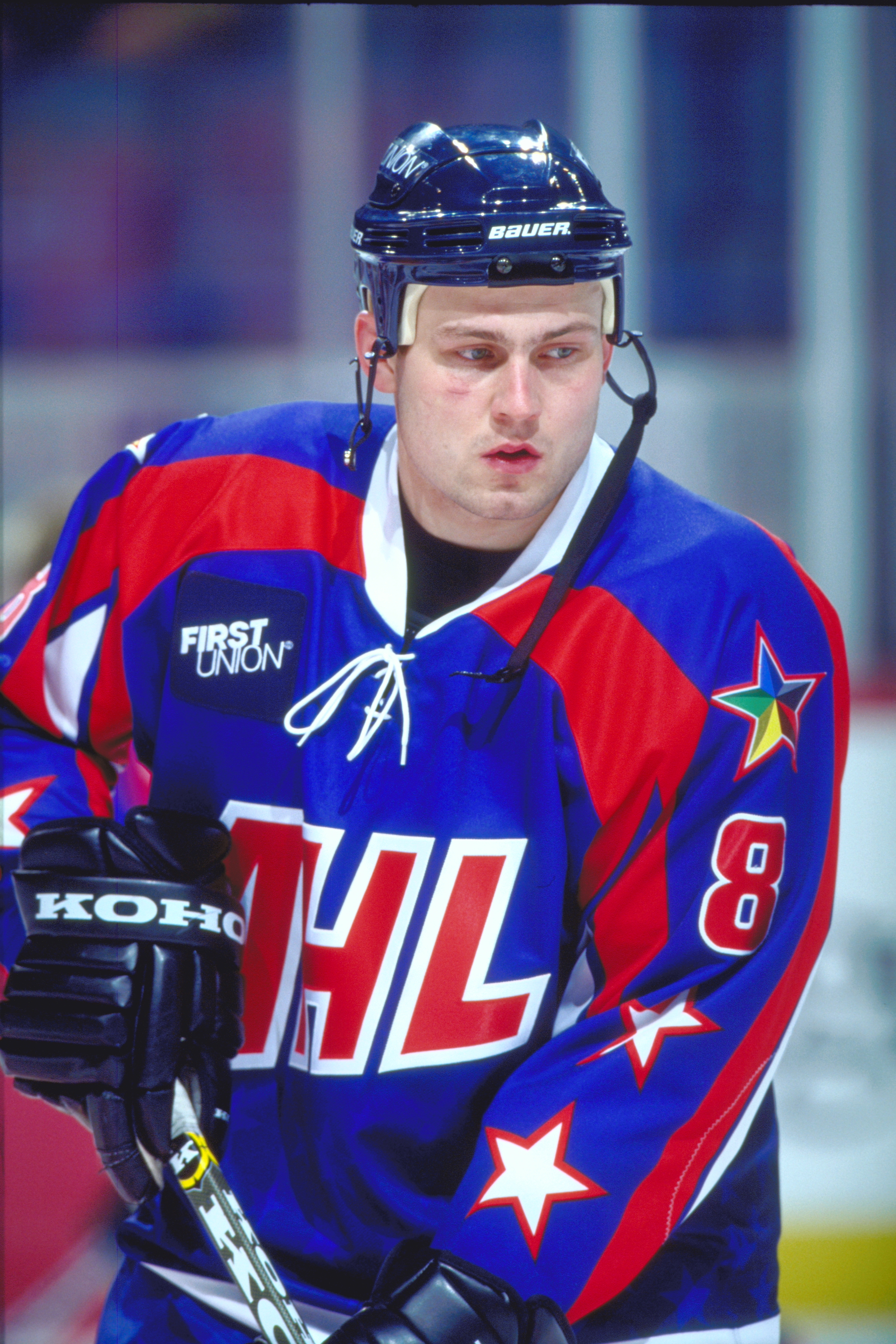
- Born: June 22, 1978 Togliatti, Russian SFSR, Soviet Union
- Died: July 16, 2020 (aged 42)
- Height: 6 ft 1 in (185 cm)
- Weight: 207 lb (94 kg; 14 st 11 lb)
- Position: Defence
- Shot: Left
- Played for: Lada Togliatti; Torpedo Nizhny Novgorod; Washington Capitals; Vancouver Canucks; Neftekhimik Nizhnekamsk; Severstal Cherepovets; Sibir Novosibirsk; Amur Khabarovsk
- NHL draft: 115th overall, 1996; Buffalo Sabres
- Playing career: 1994–2015

Alexei Pavlovich Tezikov (Russian: Алексей Павлович Тезиков; June 22, 1978 – July 16, 2020) was a Russian professional ice hockey defenceman who played in the National Hockey League with the Washington Capitals and Vancouver Canucks.

Originally drafted by the Buffalo Sabres in the 1996 NHL entry draft, Tezikov was dealt at the trade deadline of the 1998–99 NHL season to the Washington Capitals in exchange for Joé Juneau. He spent a few years in the minors before being traded to the Mighty Ducks of Anaheim, and then was claimed on waivers by the Vancouver Canucks.

Tezikov left North America following the 2001–02 season, returning to his native Russia to play in the Russian Superleague and Kontinental Hockey League over the next 11 years.

Tezikov died on July 16, 2020, at the age of 42, after suffering a heart attack.

== Career statistics ==
=== Regular season and playoffs ===
			Regular season					Playoffs
Season	Team	League	GP	G	A	Pts	PIM	GP	G	A	Pts	PIM
1994–95	Lada Togliatti-2	RUS.2	39	7	3	10	32	—	—	—	—	—
1995–96	Lada Togliatti	RSL	14	0	0	0	8	—	—	—	—	—
1996–97	Lada Togliatti	RSL	7	0	0	0	4	—	—	—	—	—
1996–97	Torpedo Nizhny Novgorod	RSL	5	0	2	2	2	—	—	—	—	—
1997–98	Moncton Wildcats	QMJHL	60	15	33	48	144	10	3	8	11	20
1998–99	Moncton Wildcats	QMJHL	25	9	21	30	52	—	—	—	—	—
1998–99	Rochester Americans	AHL	31	3	7	10	41	—	—	—	—	—
1998–99	Cincinnati Cyclones	IHL	5	0	0	0	2	3	0	0	0	10
1998–99	Washington Capitals	NHL	5	0	0	0	0	—	—	—	—	—
1999–00	Portland Pirates	AHL	53	6	9	15	70	—	—	—	—	—
1999–00	Washington Capitals	NHL	23	1	1	2	2	—	—	—	—	—
2000–01	Portland Pirates	AHL	58	7	24	31	58	—	—	—	—	—
2000–01	Cincinnati Mighty Ducks	AHL	13	2	6	8	8	4	0	1	1	0
2001–02	Manitoba Moose	AHL	28	5	6	11	16	3	0	0	0	2
2001–02	Vancouver Canucks	NHL	2	0	0	0	0	—	—	—	—	—
2003–04	Lada Togliatti	RSL	2	0	0	0	2	—	—	—	—	—
2003–04	Lada Togliatti-2	Rus.3	4	2	0	2	6	—	—	—	—	—
2003–04	Neftekhimik Nizhnekamsk	RSL	18	1	0	1	30	—	—	—	—	—
2004–05	Severstal Cherepovets	RSL	29	1	3	4	14	—	—	—	—	—
2004–05	Sibir Novosibirsk	RSL	10	0	3	3	2	—	—	—	—	—
2005–06	Sibir Novosibirsk	RSL	48	2	3	5	52	4	0	0	0	6
2006–07	Amur Khabarovsk	RSL	37	2	8	10	46	—	—	—	—	—
2007–08	Amur Khabarovsk	RSL	56	4	9	13	68	4	0	0	0	10
2008–09	Severstal Cherepovets	KHL	36	2	2	4	40	—	—	—	—	—
2009–10	CSK VVS Samara	Rus.2	16	2	4	6	36	—	—	—	—	—
2009–10	Torpedo Nizhny Novgorod	KHL	13	0	1	1	8	—	—	—	—	—
2010–11	Lada Togliatti	VHL	42	4	21	25	72	—	—	—	—	—
2010–11	Molot-Prikamie Perm	VHL	10	0	1	1	6	8	2	3	5	12
2011–12	HC Donbass	VHL	11	0	2	2	31	—	—	—	—	—
2011–12	HC Donbass-2	PHL	28	5	20	25	20	—	—	—	—	—
2012–13	Sokil Kyiv	PHL	35	6	14	20	66	10	2	3	5	10
2013–14	Metallurg Zhlobin	BXL	10	0	6	6	16	—	—	—	—	—
2013–14	Saryarka Karaganda	VHL	1	0	0	0	0	—	—	—	—	—
2013–14	Berkut Karaganda	KAZ	12	0	7	7	20	—	—	—	—	—
2013–14	HC Ryazan	VHL	17	0	1	1	10	—	—	—	—	—
2014–15	Sokol Krasnoyarsk	VHL	17	0	3	3	8	—	—	—	—	—
2014–15	Beibarys Atyrau	KAZ	23	0	5	5	12	3	0	0	0	0
RSL totals			226	10	28	38	228	8	0	0	0	16
NHL totals			30	1	1	2	2	—	—	—	—	—

Medal record

Representing Russia

Ice hockey

World Junior Championships
Silver medal – second place	1998 Finland	

=== International ===
Year	Team	Event	Result	GP	G	A	Pts	PIM
1998	Russia	WJC	2nd place, silver medalist(s)	7	0	3	3	6
Junior totals				7	0	3	3	6

== Awards and honors ==
Award	Year
QMJHL
All-Rookie Team	1998
Raymond Lagacé Trophy	1998
Second All-Star Team	1998
AHL
All-Star Game	2001

Awards and achievements
Preceded by Christian Bronsard	Winner of the Raymond Lagacé Trophy; 1997–98	Succeeded by Aleksei Volkov
