= Vladimir Gusev (ice hockey) =

Russian ice hockey player

- Born: November 24, 1982 (age 42); Novosibirsk, Russia
- Height: 6 ft 2 in (188 cm)
- Weight: 212 lb (96 kg; 15 st 2 lb)
- Position: Defence
- Shot: left
- Played for: Metallurg Novokuznetsk; Amur Khabarovsk; Sibir Novosibirsk; Norfolk Admirals; Florence Pride; Greenville Grrrowl; Lokomotiv Yaroslavl; Yermak Angarsk; Rubin Tyumen; Dizel Penza
- NHL draft: 115th overall, 2001; Chicago Blackhawks
- Playing career: 1999–2017

Vladimir Vitalyevich Gusev (born November 24, 1982) is a Russian professional ice hockey defenceman who currently plays for Metallurg Novokuznetsk of the Kontinental Hockey League (KHL).

== Career statistics ==
=== Regular season and playoffs ===
			Regular season					Playoffs
Season	Team	League	GP	G	A	Pts	PIM	GP	G	A	Pts	PIM
1999–2000	Metallurg–2 Novokuznetsk	RUS.3	21	1	0	1	44	—	—	—	—	—
1999–2000	Metallurg Novokuznetsk	RSL	—	—	—	—	—	1	0	0	0	0
2000–01	Amur Khabarovsk	RSL	3	0	0	0	0	—	—	—	—	—
2000–01	Amur–2 Khabarovsk	RUS.3	3	0	0	0	8	—	—	—	—	—
2000–01	Avangard–VDV Omsk	RUS.3	2	1	0	1	0	—	—	—	—	—
2000–01	Sibir–2 Novosibirsk	RUS.3	15	1	0	1	24	—	—	—	—	—
2000–01	Sibir Novosibirsk	RUS.2	—	—	—	—	—	2	0	0	0	2
2001–02	Sibir Novosibirsk	RUS.2	40	1	3	4	82	2	0	0	0	0
2001–02	Sibir–2 Novosibirsk	RUS.3	11	5	4	9	16	—	—	—	—	—
2002–03	Sibir–2 Novosibirsk	RUS.3	28	6	9	15	48	—	—	—	—	—
2003–04	Norfolk Admirals	AHL	10	0	1	1	10	—	—	—	—	—
2003–04	Florence Pride	ECHL	55	5	9	14	59	—	—	—	—	—
2004–05	Norfolk Admirals	AHL	2	0	0	0	6	—	—	—	—	—
2004–05	Greenville Grrrowl	ECHL	70	8	11	19	113	—	—	—	—	—
2005–06	Norfolk Admirals	AHL	1	0	0	0	0	—	—	—	—	—
2005–06	Greenville Grrrowl	ECHL	60	3	11	14	99	—	—	—	—	—
2006–07	Lokomotiv Yaroslavl	RSL	7	0	0	0	18	—	—	—	—	—
2006–07	Lokomotiv–2 Yaroslavl	RUS.3	5	0	2	2	4	—	—	—	—	—
2006–07	Metallurg Novokuznetsk	RSL	29	1	6	7	40	2	0	1	1	2
2007–08	Sibir Novosibirsk	RSL	19	0	0	0	22	—	—	—	—	—
2007–08	Metallurg Novokuznetsk	RSL	20	1	3	4	53	—	—	—	—	—
2007–08	Metallurg–2 Novokuznetsk	RUS.3	2	1	1	2	0	—	—	—	—	—
2008–09	Metallurg Novokuznetsk	KHL	48	4	4	8	77	—	—	—	—	—
2009–10	Metallurg Novokuznetsk	KHL	25	0	4	4	30	—	—	—	—	—
2010–11	Metallurg Novokuznetsk	KHL	9	0	1	1	4	—	—	—	—	—
2010–11	Yermak Angarsk	VHL	8	0	2	2	37	—	—	—	—	—
2010–11	Rubin Tyumen	VHL	13	0	2	2	18	16	0	2	2	39
2011–12	Rubin Tyumen	VHL	48	3	13	16	50	19	3	2	5	75
2012–13	Rubin Tyumen	VHL	49	2	3	5	82	11	0	3	3	14
2013–14	Dizel Penza	VHL	19	3	3	6	20	—	—	—	—	—
2013–14	Rubin Tyumen	VHL	19	2	1	3	10	22	2	1	3	22
2014–15	Rubin Tyumen	VHL	45	3	6	9	66	11	0	2	2	14
2015–16	Yermak Angarsk	VHL	2	0	1	1	2	—	—	—	—	—
2015–16	Rubin Tyumen	VHL	35	1	8	9	73	—	—	—	—	—
2016–17	Rubin Tyumen	VHL	18	0	0	0	4	—	—	—	—	—
RSL & KHL totals			160	6	18	24	244	3	0	1	1	2
ECHL totals			185	16	31	47	271	—	—	—	—	—
RUS.2 & VHL totals			296	15	42	57	444	83	5	10	15	166

=== International ===
Year	Team	Event	GP	G	A	Pts	PIM
2000	Russia	WJC18	6	1	1	2	4
Junior totals			6	1	1	2	4
