= Yevgeni Tunik =

- Born: November 17, 1984 (age 41) Kraskovo, Soviet Union
- Height: 6 ft 2 in (188 cm)
- Weight: 198 lb (90 kg; 14 st 2 lb)
- Position: Centre
- Shot: Left
- VHL team Former teams: Kuban Krasnodar; Toros Neftekamsk; SKA Saint Petersburg; Kristall Elektrostal; Bridgeport Sound Tigers
- National team: Russia
- NHL draft: 53rd overall, 2003; New York Islanders
- Playing career: 1999–2016

Yevgeni Tunik (born November 17, 1984) is the product of the Elektrostal hockey system. The young forward was also consistently part of Russia's U18 and U20 national teams. Tunik was drafted by the New York Islanders during the 2003 NHL entry draft. Since the draft he has struggled to become a regular in the Super League and has primarily skated in the second tier Russian High League. During the summer of 2005 the young forward came over to North America and spend the 2005–06 season with the AHL's Bridgeport Sound Tigers, enjoying marginal success. After the season Tunik decided to return to Russia to continue his career .

== Career statistics ==
=== Regular season and playoffs ===
			Regular season					Playoffs
Season	Team	League	GP	G	A	Pts	PIM	GP	G	A	Pts	PIM
1999–2000	Elemash–2 Elektrostal	RUS-3	3	0	0	0	4	—	—	—	—	—
2000–01	Elemash Elektrostal	RUS-2	8	2	0	2	2	—	—	—	—	—
2000–01	Elemash–2 Elektrostal	RUS-3	27	9	6	15	46	—	—	—	—	—
2001–02	Elemash Elektrostal	RUS-2	22	5	0	5	8	—	—	—	—	—
2001–02	Elemash–2 Elektrostal	RUS-3	14	13	6	19	18	—	—	—	—	—
2002–03	Elemash Elektrostal	RUS-2	42	14	10	24	24	—	—	—	—	—
2002–03	Elemash–2 Elektrostal	RUS-3	1	0	0	0	0	—	—	—	—	—
2002–03	CSKA–2 Moscow	RUS-3	1	1	1	2	2	—	—	—	—	—
2003–04	SKA St. Petersburg	RSL	32	3	1	4	26	—	—	—	—	—
2003–04	SKA–2 St. Petersburg	RUS-3	9	6	5	11	54	1	0	0	0	2
2004–05	SKA St. Petersburg	RSL	4	0	0	0	8	—	—	—	—	—
2004–05	SKA–2 St. Petersburg	RUS-3	15	8	6	14	64	—	—	—	—	—
2004–05	Kristall Elektrostal	RUS-2	12	3	2	5	18	—	—	—	—	—
2004–05	Neftyanik Leninogorsk	RUS-2	6	0	0	0	32	1	1	0	1	0
2005–06	Bridgeport Sound Tigers	AHL	61	4	14	18	44	—	—	—	—	—
2006–07	Kristall Elektrostal	RUS-2	34	4	2	6	71	—	—	—	—	—
2006–07	Kristall–2 Elektrostal	RUS-4	1	0	0	0	0	—	—	—	—	—
2007–08	Kristall Elektrostal	RUS-2	58	17	15	32	109	—	—	—	—	—
2008–09	MHC Krylya Sovetov	RUS-2	59	21	16	37	82	15	7	6	13	30
2009–10	Toros Neftekamsk	RUS-2	47	14	20	34	40	15	3	4	7	22
2010–11	Toros Neftekamsk	VHL	56	24	27	51	30	12	2	2	4	2
2011–12	Toros Neftekamsk	VHL	52	16	20	36	16	6	0	1	1	4
2012–13	Kuban Krasnodar	VHL	46	8	12	20	10	—	—	—	—	—
2013–14	Kuban Krasnodar	VHL	2	0	0	0	2	—	—	—	—	—
2013–14	Chelmet Chelyabinsk	VHL	25	4	4	8	28	—	—	—	—	—
2014–15	Yermak Angarsk	VHL	21	2	4	6	12	—	—	—	—	—
2014–15	HC Rostov	RUS-3	13	9	7	16	22	11	4	5	9	28
2015–16	Slavutych Smolensk	RUS-3	4	2	1	3	12	—	—	—	—	—
RUS-2 totals			287	80	65	145	386	31	11	10	21	52
RSL totals			38	3	2	5	34	—	—	—	—	—
VHL totals			202	54	66	120	98	18	2	3	5	6

=== International ===
Year	Team	Event	Result	GP	G	A	Pts	PIM
2001	Russia	U17	7th	5	1	1	2	2
2002	Russia	WJC18	2nd place, silver medalist(s)	8	1	3	4	14
2004	Russia	WJC	5th	5	0	1	1	4
Junior totals				18	2	5	7	20
