= Denis Yachmenev =

Russian ice hockey player

- Born: 4 June 1984 (age 41) Chelyabinsk, Russian SFSR, Soviet Union
- Height: 6 ft 0 in (183 cm)
- Weight: 198 lb (90 kg; 14 st 2 lb)
- Position: Left wing
- Shot: Right
- VHL team Former teams: Rubin Tyumen; Traktor Chelyabinsk; Amur Khabarovsk; HC Sibir Novosibirsk
- NHL draft: 200th overall, 2002; Florida Panthers
- Playing career: 2003–2021

Denis Aleksandrovich Yachmenev (Russian: Денис Александрович Ячменёв; born 6 April 1984) is a Russian professional ice hockey player who currently plays for Rubin Tyumen of the Supreme Hockey League (VHL). He is the younger brother of former Los Angeles Kings and Nashville Predators forward Vitali Yachmenev.

== Career ==
Yachmenev began playing junior hockey in the Ontario Hockey League with the North Bay Centennials, who drafted him in the 1st Round (26th overall) of the 2001 CHL Import Draft. He was then drafted 200th overall by the Florida Panthers in the 2002 NHL entry draft. He spent one more season in the OHL for the Saginaw Spirit before returning to Russia for the 2003–04 to join Amur Khabarovsk of the Russian Superleague.

The team were relegated from the Superleague that season but Yachmenev remained with the team in the second-tier Vysshaya Liga for the next two seasons. He then returned to the Superleague in 2006 with Sibir Novosibirsk for one season before moving to Traktor Chelyabinsk the following season. He played eight games for Traktor in the newly created Kontinental Hockey League in the 2008–09 KHL season before spending the remainder of the season with their secondary team.

== Career statistics ==
| | | | Regular season | | | | | Playoffs |
| Season | Team | League | GP | G | A | Pts | PIM | GP | G | A | Pts | PIM |
|---|---|---|---|---|---|---|---|---|---|---|---|---|
| 2000–01 | Traktor–2 Chelyabinsk | RUS.3 | 7 | 1 | 1 | 2 | 0 | — | — | — | — | — |
| 2001–02 | North Bay Centennials | OHL | 65 | 17 | 12 | 29 | 32 | 5 | 2 | 0 | 2 | 0 |
| 2002–03 | Saginaw Spirit | OHL | 68 | 17 | 28 | 45 | 69 | — | — | — | — | — |
| 2003–04 | Amur Khabarovsk | RSL | 25 | 0 | 1 | 1 | 4 | — | — | — | — | — |
| 2003–04 | Amur–2 Khabarovsk | RUS.3 | 20 | 15 | 8 | 23 | 18 | — | — | — | — | — |
| 2004–05 | Amur Khabarovsk | RUS.2 | 42 | 7 | 14 | 21 | 28 | 13 | 3 | 1 | 4 | 8 |
| 2004–05 | Amur–2 Khabarovsk | RUS.3 | 1 | 1 | 0 | 1 | 0 | — | — | — | — | — |
| 2005–06 | Amur Khabarovsk | RUS.2 | 46 | 9 | 14 | 23 | 43 | 11 | 2 | 3 | 5 | 6 |
| 2005–06 | Amur–2 Khabarovsk | RUS.3 | 2 | 1 | 2 | 3 | 0 | — | — | — | — | — |
| 2006–07 | Sibir Novosibirsk | RSL | 16 | 0 | 0 | 0 | 8 | 1 | 0 | 0 | 0 | 0 |
| 2006–07 | Sibir–2 Novosibirsk | RUS.3 | 6 | 0 | 3 | 3 | 8 | — | — | — | — | — |
| 2007–08 | Traktor Chelyabinsk | RSL | 40 | 2 | 7 | 9 | 22 | 2 | 0 | 0 | 0 | 0 |
| 2008–09 | Traktor Chelyabinsk | KHL | 8 | 0 | 0 | 0 | 2 | — | — | — | — | — |
| 2008–09 | Traktor–2 Chelyabinsk | RUS.3 | 49 | 31 | 21 | 52 | 58 | — | — | — | — | — |
| 2009–10 | Gazovik Tyumen | RUS.2 | 40 | 11 | 5 | 16 | 12 | 7 | 0 | 4 | 4 | 6 |
| 2010–11 | Rubin Tyumen | VHL | 55 | 13 | 12 | 25 | 30 | 15 | 3 | 3 | 6 | 8 |
| 2011–12 | Rubin Tyumen | VHL | 51 | 8 | 14 | 22 | 20 | 20 | 6 | 4 | 10 | 6 |
| 2012–13 | Rubin Tyumen | VHL | 48 | 8 | 7 | 15 | 14 | 12 | 0 | 0 | 0 | 14 |
| 2013–14 | Rubin Tyumen | VHL | 44 | 10 | 9 | 19 | 16 | 19 | 4 | 8 | 12 | 12 |
| 2014–15 | Rubin Tyumen | VHL | 52 | 7 | 7 | 14 | 51 | 9 | 1 | 2 | 3 | 4 |
| 2015–16 | Rubin Tyumen | VHL | 37 | 4 | 10 | 14 | 10 | — | — | — | — | — |
| 2016–17 | Rubin Tyumen | VHL | 47 | 13 | 19 | 32 | 16 | 17 | 5 | 4 | 9 | 22 |
| 2017–18 | Tsen Tou Jilin City | VHL | 52 | 15 | 14 | 29 | 25 | 4 | 1 | 0 | 1 | 2 |
| 2018–19 | Rubin Tyumen | VHL | 37 | 9 | 16 | 25 | 55 | 20 | 2 | 7 | 9 | 20 |
| 2019–20 | Rubin Tyumen | VHL | 52 | 12 | 18 | 30 | 35 | 10 | 3 | 5 | 8 | 6 |
| 2020–21 | Rubin Tyumen | VHL | 48 | 6 | 11 | 17 | 18 | 16 | 2 | 2 | 4 | 20 |
| RUS.2 totals | | | 128 | 27 | 33 | 60 | 83 | 31 | 5 | 8 | 13 | 20 |
| RSL totals | | | 81 | 2 | 8 | 10 | 34 | 3 | 0 | 0 | 0 | 0 |
| VHL totals | | | 523 | 105 | 137 | 242 | 290 | 142 | 27 | 35 | 62 | 114 |
