= Ilya Antonovsky =

Russian ice hockey player (born 1989)

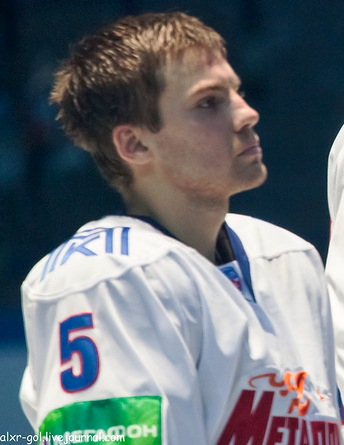
- Born: July 3, 1989 (age 36); Moscow, Russian SFSR
- Height: 6 ft 2 in (188 cm)
- Weight: 194 lb (88 kg; 13 st 12 lb)
- Position: Defence
- Shoots: Left
- team Former teams: Free Agent; HC MVD; HC Dynamo Moscow; Spartak Moscow; Metallurg Magnitogorsk; Avtomobilist Yekaterinburg; Metallurg Novokuznetsk
- Playing career: 2007–present

Ilya Antonovsky (born July 3, 1989) is a Russian professional ice hockey defenceman who is currently an unrestricted free agent.

Antonovsky made his Kontinental Hockey League (KHL) debut playing with HC Spartak Moscow during the 2011–12 KHL season.

== Playing career ==
=== Junior ===
From 2007 to 2011 Ilya Antonovsky was in the system of HC MVD Balashikha and HC Dynamo Moscow KHL, playing in the newly formed farm team HC MVD-2 Bakashikha. U18

=== Youth Hockey League ===
Season 2009/10: transferred to the newly formed Youth Hockey League JHL to the new team Sheriff Balashikha as the farm team of HC MVD.

On Challenge Cup JHL Ilya was a defenseman candidate to team "West".

=== Supreme Hockey League ===
Season 2010/11: debuted in the reorganized SHL once again in the newly formed club Dynamo Balashikha, which become the farm team of the United Hockey Club HC Dynamo Moscow KHL. U21

October 2011: Antonovsky Ilya received the prize from the hands of the chief coach of Dynamo (Moscow) Oleg Znarok as become the best defender of the month in SHL. Sniper-defender had retained the 3rd place in the regular Championship SHL, although he was transferred into the main team of Dynamo(Moscow) (KHL). But to play for main team Dynamo(Moscow) was impossible, because at that time many games were lost and there was no chance on experiments with young players.

=== KHL ===
December 21, 2011: Antonovsky was exchanged to HC Spartak Moscow. On December 23, 2011 debuted in the KHL in winning match against Avangard Omsk. U22

June 5, 2012 the rights to the player were bought by the Metallurg Magnitogorsk KHL. In pre seasonal XXI international Memorial I. H. Romazan ILya was sent to the "Romazan team", united with five young players from each team of the tournament. The newly formed team took the second place in the tournament. Antonovsky received personal awards for the best defender of the match, the prize of the best defender of the tournament and declared in a symbolic top five of the tournament (Magnitogorsk 2012).

During the lockout in the NHL 2012/13 Ilya Antonovsky had the opportunity to play with Evgeni Malkin, Sergei Gonchar and Nikolay Kulemin in the Metallurg Magnitogorsk. But after 10 matches Antonovsky was sent to the farm team Yuzhny Ural Orsk SHL to save game practice. On playoffs Ilya was returned to the location of the main team Metallurg Magnitogorsk. The team finished in 1/4 final Eastern conference of the KHL.

On 1 May 2013 HC Vityaz Podolsk bought the right of the player In the pre-season period Ilya is fully trained with the team in Germany and played in three matches for the Cup of the President of the Republic of Kazakhstan in 2013 Astana. At the last moment before the start of the regular season Antonovsky had not get into the main roster and already in the Tournament "Stone flower-2013" took second place, playing three games with Automobilist in Yekaterinburg. In the regular season Ilya played seven games with the main team, but then was sent in farm-club Sputnik Nizhny Tagil SHL to save game practice. as preference was given to their local players.

In the season 2015/16 Antonovsky began the regular season in the main team HC Metallurg Novokuznetsk KHL, but on November 23, 2015 decided to return to the hockey team Avtomobilist Yekaterinburg KHL. On the 89th Spengler Cup 2015 Ilya played in three matches (Switzerland, Davos). In playoffs Ilya was in the main team Avtomobilist Yekaterinburg.

=== Kazakhstan ===
During the season 2013/2014 Ilya Antonovsky was invited to the international top hockey team Saryarka Karaganda Kazakhstan SHL, which then became the Champion of the Supreme Hockey League of Russia and won the main trophy Bratina Cup.

In the season 2014/15 Antonovsky continued to play as alternate captain with hockey team Saryarka Karaganda Kazakhstan SHL. In the pre-season period the team did not lose any game. The team won the opening match of the season. Ilya become the best defender of the first week of 2015. HC Saryarka was the winner of the regular championship SHL. In the second round of the playoffs Ilya was the winner in the nomination "the best defender" in the seven matches 5 points (3 goals + 2 assists) with the value "+4" and one game-winning puck. The team won the 3rd place in the Championship SHL.

In the season 2016/17 Ilya Antonovsky played in Saryarka Karaganda Kazakhstan SHL as the alternate captain. The second half of the season played as the captain.

In the season 2017/18 Ilya was elected by his team as the Captain (ice hockey). In november he was the best as the defender of the week and of the month in the Supreme Hockey League. Finally after the regular season Ilya Antonovsky was the first among assists(defensemen) and was on the 2-nd place among scorers-defensemen of the League.

== Personal ==
From 2005 till 2012 year Ilya Antonovsky was a medical student of the I.M. Sechenov First Moscow State Medical University.

From 2014 till 2017 year Ilya Antonovsky studied in magistrature of the Russian State University of Physical Education, Sport, Youth and Tourism (SCOLIPE) and became the first who received the title of magister at the Department of hockey. Ilya is the nephew of Denis Yuskov 3-time world champion and the world record holder in speed skating on the distance 1500 m. 3-time world Cup holder on 1500 m speed skating.

Ilya Antonovsky is married and has three sons Daniel, Artem, Fillip.

== Career statistics ==
			Regular season					Playoffs
Season	Team	League	GP	G	A	Pts	PIM	GP	G	A	Pts	PIM
2007–08	HC MVD Balashikha	RUS.3	30	0	4	4	28	3	0	0	0	0
2008–09	HC MVD Balashikha	RUS.3	72	8	24	32	98	4	0	2	2	4
2009–10	Sheriff Balashikha	MHL	66	5	26	31	66	3	2	0	2	0
2010–11	Dynamo Balashikha	VHL	52	6	15	21	90	—	—	—	—	—
2011–12	Dynamo Balashikha	VHL	28	11	7	18	20	—	—	—	—	—
2011–12	HC Spartak Moscow	KHL	10	0	0	0	4	—	—	—	—	—
2012–13	Yuzhny Ural Orsk	VHL	23	3	9	12	14	—	—	—	—	—
2012–13	Metallurg Magnitogorsk	KHL	10	0	0	0	2	—	—	—	—	—
2013–14	Avtomobilist Yekaterinburg	KHL	7	0	0	0	0	—	—	—	—	—
2013–14	Sputnik Nizhny Tagil	VHL	27	7	8	15	18	—	—	—	—	—
2013–14	Saryarka Karagandy	VHL	12	0	3	3	10	16	1	4	5	6
2014–15	Saryarka Karagandy	VHL	47	8	10	18	52	17	3	7	10	14
2015–16	Metallurg Novokuznetsk	KHL	15	0	1	1	4	—	—	—	—	—
2015–16	Avtomobilist Yekaterinburg	KHL	6	0	0	0	2	—	—	—	—	—
2016–17	Saryarka Karagandy	VHL	46	2	12	14	48	11	0	5	5	4
2017–18	Saryarka Karagandy	VHL	51	7	20	27	66	7	1	2	3	2
2018–19	Saryarka Karagandy	VHL	8	0	2	2	4	—	—	—	—	—
2018–19	Torpedo Ust-Kamenogorsk	VHL	32	5	11	16	14	—	—	—	—	—
2019–20	Torpedo Ust-Kamenogorsk	VHL	18	0	6	6	10	—	—	—	—	—
2019–20	Altay-Torpedo Ust-Kamenogorsk	KAZ	14	0	4	4	31	1	0	0	0	0
KHL totals			48	0	1	1	10	—	—	—	—	—

== Awards ==
2000–2005 Champion of Moscow five-time for five consecutive years with the hockey school "Vastom-89".

2005–2007 Twice silver medalist of the Championship of Moscow and Captain of the teams "Vastom" (2005/06 and 2006/07). The scorer and assistant of the Open Championship of Moscow (2006). The second scorer of the Championship of Moscow (2007).

2008–2009 Silver medalist of the 1st winter games of youth of Russia with team "Center" (Chelyabinsk, 2008).

2010–2011 SHL Defenseman of the month (February) with team Dynamo Balashikha.

2011–2012 SHL Defenseman of the month (October) with team Dynamo Balashikha.

2012–2013 KHL Hockey pre-season annual 21-th tournament memorial I. H. Romazan. The best defender of the match against the Tractor Chelyabinsk and the prize of the best defender of the tournament. Declared in a symbolic top five of the tournament (Magnitogorsk 2012).

2013–2014 SHL The Champion and Bratina Cup holder.

2014–2015 SHL The winner of the opening match of the season and the winner of the regular season with Saryarka Karagandy Kazakhstan. The best defender in the second round of the playoffs. The first assistant defender at the play-offs. The second scorers-defensemen at the play-offs. The contender for the title of the best defender of the season SHL.

2017–1018 SHLThe prize of the best defender in preseason tournament the Cup of the Governor of the Orenburg region (Orsk 2017). The winner in the nomination "best defender" of the week, and Nov season 2017/2018 in the Saryarka (Karaganda) team. In the regular season Ilya Antonovsky was the first among assists(defensemen) and was on the 2-nd place among scorers-defensemen of the League.

2018-2019 SHL The Champion and Petrov Cup holder as the player Saryarka Karagandy Kazakhstan.
