= 2009–10 Vysshaya Liga season =

Russian ice hockey league season

The 2009–10 Vysshaya Liga season was the 18th season of the Vysshaya Liga, the second level of ice hockey in Russia. 27 teams participated in the league. HC Yugra won the championship, and was promoted to the Kontinental Hockey League

== First round ==
=== Western Conference ===
	Club	GP	W	OTW	OTL	L	GF	GA	Pts
1.	Dizel Penza	54	37	2	6	9	166	80	121
2.	Krylya Sovetov Moscow	54	27	8	5	14	187	143	102
3.	Khimik Voskresensk	54	28	6	4	16	165	153	100
4.	Titan Klin	54	26	4	3	21	188	170	89
5.	HC Ryazan	54	24	4	5	21	176	172	85
6.	THK Tver	54	22	4	3	25	172	182	77
7.	HC VMF St. Petersburg	54	20	6	5	23	161	141	77
8.	HC Lipetsk	54	21	3	4	26	171	178	73
9.	HC Sarov	54	14	5	5	30	126	174	57
10.	HC Rys Podolsk	54	7	2	4	41	114	233	29

=== Central Conference ===
	Club	GP	W	OTW	OTL	L	GF	GA	Pts
1.	Toros Neftekamsk	48	34	5	4	5	172	96	116
2.	Molot-Prikamie Perm	48	32	4	1	11	187	116	105
3.	Izhstal Izhevsk	48	23	5	7	13	139	97	86
4.	Neftyanik Almetyevsk	48	24	5	3	16	159	124	85
5.	Ariada-Akpars Volzhsk	48	23	0	6	19	135	129	75
6.	Gazprom-OGU Orenburg	48	15	2	5	26	129	171	54
7.	Kristall Saratov	48	14	5	2	27	132	156	54
8.	Progress Glazov	48	10	4	2	32	110	186	40
9.	CSK VVS Samara	48	9	2	2	35	104	192	33

=== Eastern Conference ===
	Club	GP	W	OTW	OTL	L	GF	GA	Pts
1.	HC Yugra	42	30	3	4	5	148	88	100
2.	Gazovik Tyumen	42	23	5	4	10	133	86	83
3.	Yuzhny Ural Orsk	42	17	4	5	16	98	97	64
4.	Zauralie Kurgan	42	15	6	4	17	121	127	61
5.	HC Mechel Chelyabinsk	42	14	4	4	20	97	130	54
6.	Ermak Angarsk	42	13	4	7	18	98	118	54
7.	Kazzinc-Torpedo Ust-Kamenogorsk	42	13	2	1	26	107	135	44
8.	Sputnik Nizhny Tagil	42	10	5	4	23	118	139	44

== Playoffs ==
First round
W6	THK Tver	3
E6	Ermak Angarsk	1
E3	Yuzhny Ural Orsk	3
C8	Progress Glazov	1
W5	HC Ryazan	3
C7	Kristall Saratov	2
E4	Zauralie Kurgan	1
E7	Kazzinc-Torpedo Ust-Kamenogorsk	3
E5	HC Mechel Chelyabinsk	3
C6	Gazprom-OGU Orenburg	0
C4	Neftyanik Almetyevsk	3
E8	Sputnik Nizhny Tagil	1
C5	Ariada-Akpars Volzhsk	3
W7	HC VMF St. Petersburg	0
W4	Titan Klin	3
W8	HC Lipetsk	1

Second round
Z1	Toros Neftekamsk	3
W6	THK Tver	1
Z3	Izhstal Izhevsk	3
E3	Yuzhny Ural Orsk	2
C2	Molot-Prikamie Perm	3
W5	HC Ryazan	0
E2	Gazovik Tyumen	3
E7	Kazzinc-Torpedo Ust-Kamenogorsk	0
E1	HC Yugra	3
E5	HC Mechel Chelyabinsk	2
W3	Khimik Voskresensk	2
C4	Neftyanik Almetyevsk	3
W1	Dizel Penza	3
C5	Ariada-Akpars Volzhsk	1
W2	Krylya Sovetov Moscow	2
W4	Titan Klin	3

Quarterfinals
C1	Toros Neftekamsk	3
C3	Izhstal Izhevsk	1
C2	Molot-Prikamie Perm	3
E2	Gazovik Tyumen	2
E1	HC Yugra	3
C4	Neftyanik Almetyevsk	1
W1	Dizel Penza	3
W4	Titan Klin	1

Semifinals
C1	Toros Neftekamsk	3
C2	Molot-Prikamie Perm	0
O1	HC Yugra	3
W1	Dizel Penza	1

Final
C1	Toros Nefetekamsk	1
E1	HC Yugra	3
