= Logan MacMillan =

Canadian ice hockey player (born 1989)

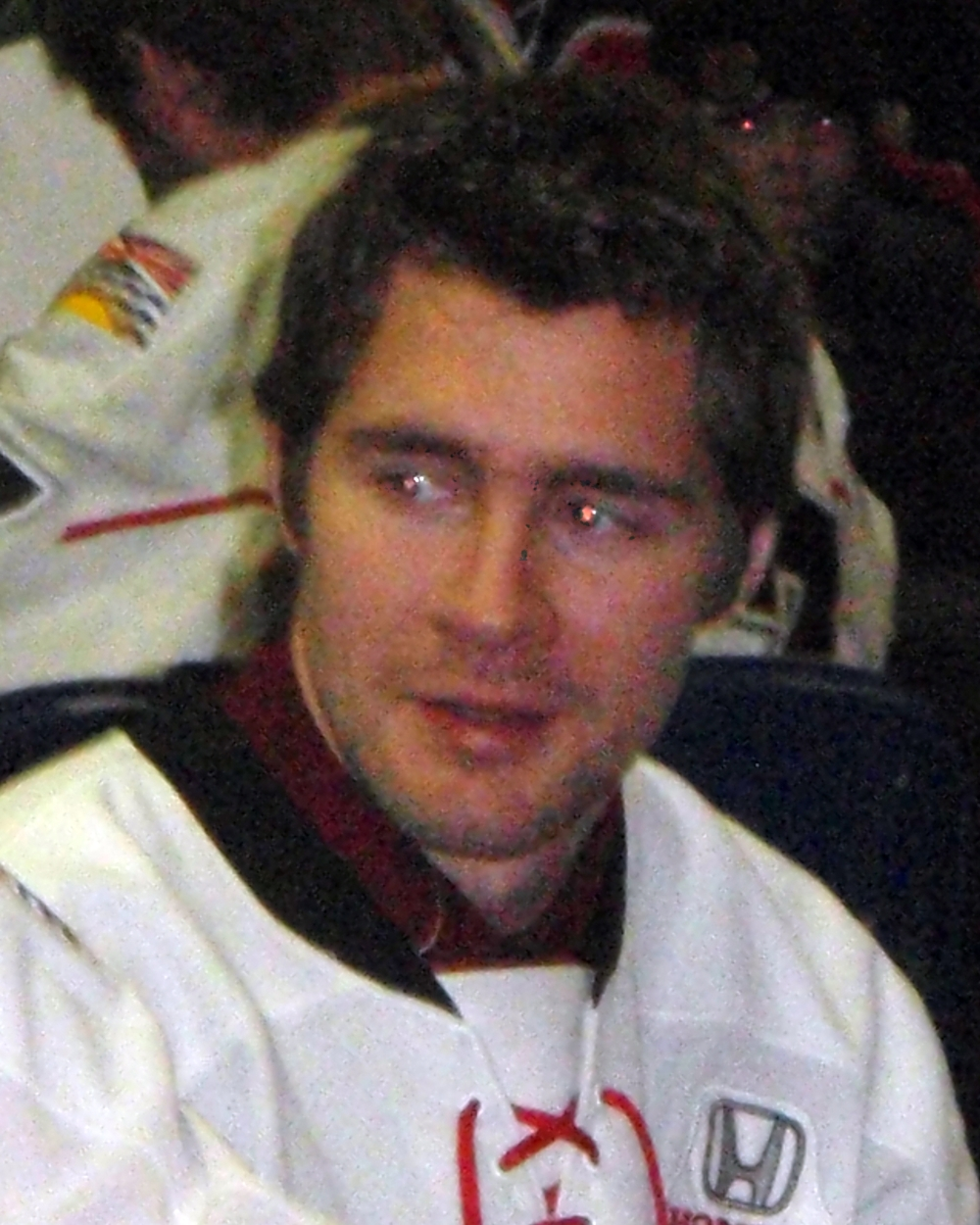
- Born: July 5, 1989 (age 36) Charlottetown, Prince Edward Island, Canada
- Height: 6 ft 1 in (185 cm)
- Weight: 176 lb (80 kg; 12 st 8 lb)
- Position: Centre
- Shot: Left
- Played for: Abbotsford Heat; Dornbirner EC; Saryarka Karaganda; Kuban Krasnodar; Nottingham Panthers; ASC Corona Brasov; Manchester Storm
- NHL draft: 19th overall, 2007; Anaheim Ducks
- Playing career: 2009–2019

Logan MacMillan (born July 5, 1989) is a Canadian former professional ice hockey centre who last played for the Manchester Storm of the Elite Ice Hockey League (EIHL). He was selected by the Anaheim Ducks of the National Hockey League (NHL) 19th overall in the 2007 NHL entry draft. MacMillan is the son of former NHL player Bob MacMillan.

== Playing career ==
MacMillan was drafted in the first round, 19th overall, by the Anaheim Ducks in the 2007 NHL entry draft. He captained Team Atlantic at the 2006 World Under-17 Hockey Challenge, posting six points (3-3-6). On December 23, 2008, MacMillan was traded by the Halifax Mooseheads to the Rimouski Océanic for Guillaume Pelletier and four draft picks.

On June 30, 2010, MacMillan was traded by the Ducks to the Calgary Flames in exchange for winger Jason Jaffray and future considerations. In his two seasons within the Flames organization, MacMillan was assigned to the Flames affiliates the Abbotsford Heat of the AHL and the Utah Grizzlies of the ECHL.

On August 7, 2012, MacMillan signed his first European contract with Dornbirner EC of the Austrian Hockey League (EBEL) for the 2012–13 season.

== Career statistics ==
=== Regular season and playoffs ===
			Regular season					Playoffs
Season	Team	League	GP	G	A	Pts	PIM	GP	G	A	Pts	PIM
2004–05	Notre Dame Hounds AAA	SMHL	41	9	19	28	27	12	2	0	2	6
2005–06	Halifax Mooseheads	QMJHL	62	9	9	18	31	11	1	0	1	0
2006–07	Halifax Mooseheads	QMJHL	68	20	35	55	82	12	9	11	20	6
2007–08	Halifax Mooseheads	QMJHL	46	15	26	41	77	15	3	10	13	20
2008–09	Halifax Mooseheads	QMJHL	15	4	6	10	27	—	—	—	—	—
2008–09	Rimouski Océanic	QMJHL	28	5	16	21	37	13	3	3	6	20
2009–10	Bakersfield Condors	ECHL	30	2	4	6	20	—	—	—	—	—
2009–10	Abbotsford Heat	AHL	7	0	0	0	7	—	—	—	—	—
2010–11	Abbotsford Heat	AHL	56	5	6	11	32	—	—	—	—	—
2011–12	Abbotsford Heat	AHL	9	0	1	1	7	—	—	—	—	—
2011–12	Utah Grizzlies	ECHL	47	10	14	24	47	—	—	—	—	—
2012–13	Dornbirner EC	EBEL	54	14	22	36	56	—	—	—	—	—
2013–14	Saryarka Karaganda	VHL	50	7	11	18	46	18	1	2	3	27
2014–15	Kuban Krasnodar	VHL	19	2	1	3	25	—	—	—	—	—
2014–15	Saryarka Karaganda	VHL	14	2	1	3	19	16	2	1	3	20
2015–16	Nottingham Panthers	EIHL	45	10	11	21	17	4	1	0	1	0
2016–17	Nottingham Panthers	EIHL	46	3	9	12	6	2	0	0	0	0
2017–18	ASC Corona Brasov	Erste	29	8	14	22	26	10	1	3	4	2
2017–18	ASC Corona Brasov	ROU	14	8	7	15	0	9	6	5	11	4
2018–19	Manchester Storm	EIHL	53	3	10	13	19	—	—	—	—	—
AHL totals			72	5	7	12	46	—	—	—	—	—
VHL totals			83	11	13	24	90	34	3	3	6	47
EIHL totals			144	16	30	46	42	6	1	0	1	0

=== International ===
Year	Team	Event	Result	GP	G	A	Pts	PIM
2005	Canada Atlantic	U17	3rd place, bronze medalist(s)	6	1	1	2	6
2006	Canada Atlantic	U17	6th	5	3	3	6	8
2006	Canada	IH18	1st place, gold medalist(s)	4	1	0	1	0
Junior totals				15	5	4	9	14

Awards and achievements
Preceded by Mark Mitera	Anaheim Ducks first-round draft pick 2007	Succeeded by Jake Gardiner
