= 2012–13 Supreme Hockey League season =

2012–13 VHL season
- League: Russian Major League
- Sport: Ice hockey
- Duration: September 9, 2012 – April 30, 2013
- Teams: 27

Regular season

Play-offs

Bratina Cup
- Champions: Toros Neftekamsk
- Runners-up: Saryarka Karaganda

VHL seasons
- ← 2011–12 2013–14 →

The 2012–13 VHL season was the third season of the Russian Major League. It started 9 September 2012 and ended in April 2013.

== Team and KHL affiliation changes ==
=== Team changes ===
- Donbass Donetsk left the league after its inaugural season joining the KHL.
- Buran Voronezh and THK Tver of the lower level Russian Hockey League joined.
- The league was expanded with two more non-Russian teams, Belarusian Yunost Minsk and Kazakhstani Saryarka Karaganda.
- A new franchise Kuban Krasnodar was created.
- HC VMF relocated from St. Petersburg to Kondopoga, Karelia.

=== Affiliation changes ===
VHL team	new affiliate	old affiliate
Kuban Krasnodar	Vityaz Chekhov	None
HC Ryazan	Sibir Novosibirsk	Vityaz Chekhov
Zauralie Kurgan	Avangard Omsk	Sibir Novosibirsk
THK Tver	CSKA Moscow	None
Ariada-Akpars Volzhsk	Metallurg Novokuznetsk	None
Ermak Angarsk	None	Metallurg Novokuznetsk
Yunost Minsk	Dinamo Minsk	None

== Regular season ==
Starting with this season the VHL abandoned its previous conference structure. All teams played their regular seasons in a round robin format with two games (home and away) against every team of the league.

=== League standings ===
Source: vhl.khl.ru

Points are awarded as follows:

- 3 Points for a win in regulation ("W")
- 2 Points for a win in overtime ("OTW") or penalty shootout ("SOW")
- 1 Point for a loss in a penalty shootout ("SOL") or overtime ("OTL")
- 0 Points for a loss in regulation ("L")

	Team	GP	W	OTW	SOW	SOL	OTL	L	GF–GA	Pts
1	(Kazakhstan) Saryarka Karaganda	52	33	1	6	2	0	10	150-89	115
2	(Russia) Rubin Tyumen	52	31	2	4	4	3	8	162-105	112
3	(Russia) Toros Neftekamsk	52	27	3	6	3	1	12	152-105	103
4	(Russia) Neftyanik Almetyevsk	52	24	2	6	6	1	13	156-115	95
5	(Russia) Yuzhny Ural Orsk	52	29	2	0	3	0	18	136-104	94
6	(Russia) Sputnik Nizhny Tagil	52	25	2	5	1	4	15	173-135	94
7	(Russia) Buran Voronezh	52	25	0	5	3	0	19	160-139	88
8	(Russia) Ermak Angarsk	52	24	2	4	3	1	18	132-142	88
9	(Russia) HC Lada Togliatti	52	24	0	5	4	2	17	149-130	88
10	(Russia) Lokomotiv Yaroslavl	52	22	3	6	2	2	17	123-118	88
11	(Russia) Dynamo Balashikha	52	23	1	5	2	2	19	158-160	85
12	(Russia) Ariada-Akpars Volzhsk	52	21	1	6	5	3	16	163-151	85
13	(Russia) Molot-Prikamye Perm	52	23	2	2	4	3	18	145-141	84
14	(Kazakhstan) Kazzinc-Torpedo	52	22	3	3	5	1	18	147-123	84
15	(Russia) HC Sarov	52	19	0	7	5	2	19	147-133	78
16	(Russia) Dizel Penza	52	21	2	1	6	1	21	137-121	76
17	(Russia) HC Kuban	52	18	2	7	4	0	21	126-116	76
18	(Russia) HC VMF	52	18	2	3	6	2	21	142-154	72
19	(Russia) THK Tver	52	16	1	5	3	3	24	147-180	66
20	(Russia) Chelmet Chelyabinsk	52	17	3	2	1	3	26	129-141	65
21	(Russia) Kristall Saratov	52	15	3	2	3	2	27	120-154	60
22	(Russia) Titan Klin	52	15	1	1	4	2	29	117-159	55
23	(Belarus) Yunost Minsk	52	12	1	5	6	1	27	104-160	55
24	(Russia) Sokol Krasnoyarsk	52	11	2	6	4	2	27	113-152	55
25	(Russia) Zauralie Kurgan	52	11	3	3	7	2	26	120-163	54
26	(Russia) Izhstal Izhevsk	52	11	1	3	7	2	28	100-163	50
27	(Russia) HC Ryazan	52	9	1	2	7	1	32	112-196	41

== Bratina Cup Playoffs ==
First round
1	Saryarka Karaganda	3
16	Dizel Penza	0
3	Toros Neftekamsk	3
14	Kazzinc-Torpedo	0
5	Yuzhny Ural Orsk	1
12	Ariada-Akpars Volzhsk	3
7	Buran Voronezh	3
10	Lokomotiv Yaroslavl	2
2	Rubin Tyumen	3
15	HC Sarov	2
4	Neftyanik Almetyevsk	1
13	Molot-Prikamye Perm	3
6	Sputnik Nizhny Tagil	3
11	Dynamo Balashikha	1
8	Ermak Angarsk	2
9	Lada Togliatti	3

Quarterfinals
1	Saryarka Karaganda	4
13	Molot-Prikamye Perm	2
3	Toros Neftekamsk	4
9	Lada Togliatti	1
2	Rubin Tyumen	3
12	Ariada-Akpars Volzhsk	4
6	Sputnik Nizhny Tagil	3
7	Buran Voronezh	4

Semifinals
1	Saryarka Karaganda	4
12	Ariada-Akpars Volzhsk	1
3	Toros Neftekamsk	4
7	Buran Voronezh	0

Finals
3	Toros Neftekamsk	4
1	Saryarka Karaganda	3
