= AKM Tula =

Ice hockey club based in Tula, Russia

HC AKM Tula
- City: Tula, Russia
- League: VHL
- Founded: 2021
- Home arena: Ice Palace (capacity: 3,363.)
- Head coach: Irek Galyaviyev
- Website: akm-hockey.ru

Hockey Club AKM (Russian: Хоккейный клуб "АКМ") is a Russian professional ice hockey club based in Tula, Russia. They play in the All-Russian Hockey League (VHL), the second level of Russian ice hockey. Their highest achievement is advancing to the VHL finals in the 2023–24 season, where they were defeated by Neftyanik Almetyevsk.

In 2024, AKM applied to join the top-tier Kontinental Hockey League (KHL). However, they were not invited to the KHL for the 2025–26 season.

== History ==
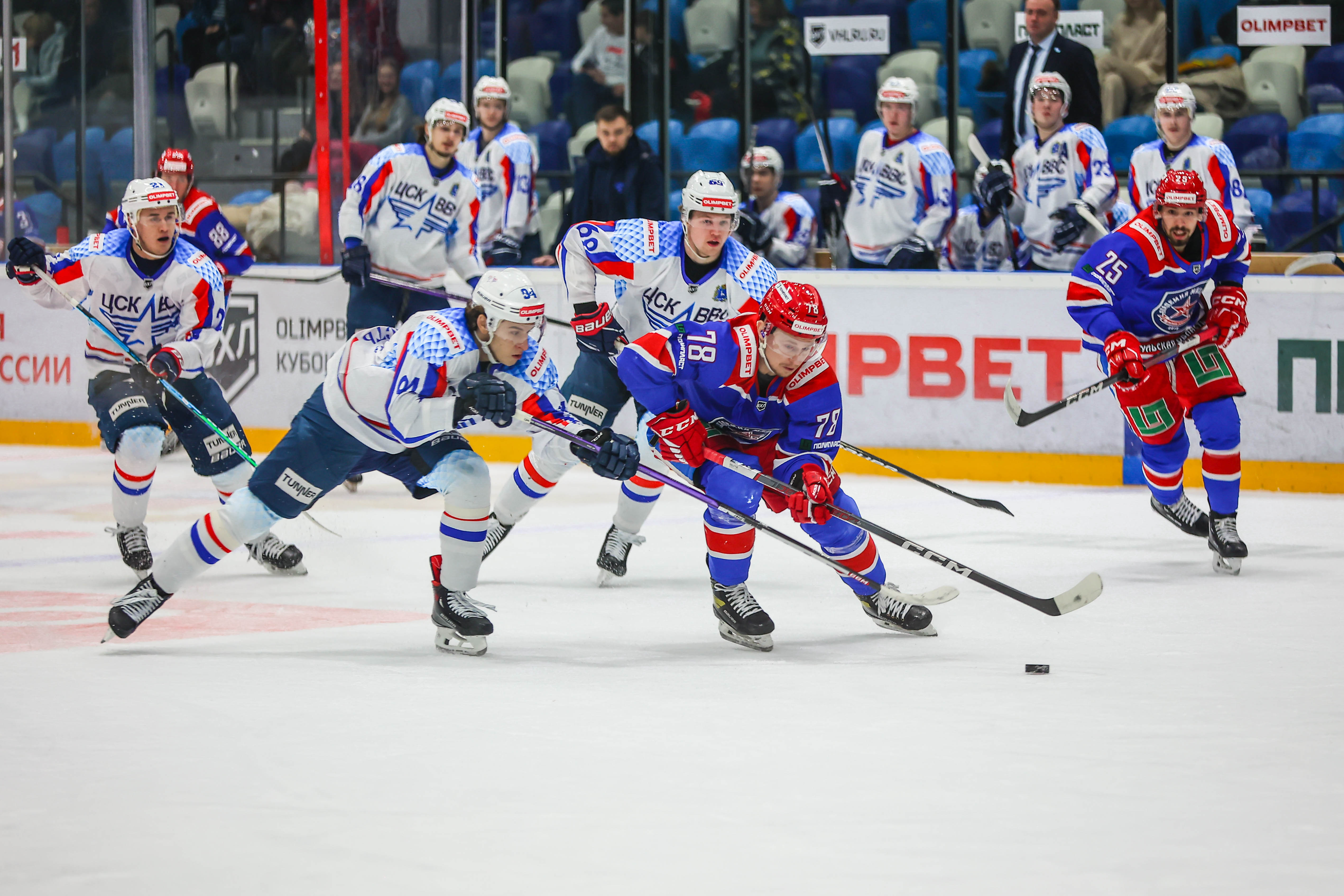
AKM playing against CSK VVS Samara in the 2023-24 VHL season

AKM Tula was created in 2021 as the senior team of Akademiya Mikhailova, a youth hockey club named after the player and coach Boris Mikhailov that was founded in 2018 in Novomoskovsk as part of the NMHL, Russia's second-tier junior league, and then relocated to Tula and joined the MHL in 2020.

Before their first season, AKM signed a player development agreement with Torpedo Nizhny Novgorod, which was resigned in 2023, and expired at the end of the 2023–24 season.

AKM's first game was a preseason match against Buran Voronezh on 30 July 2021, which resulted in a 2–3 defeat in the shootout. Their first official game was a 0–4 defeat against Neftyanik Almetyevsk.

In their first season AKM placed 17th in the league with 53 points in 52 games, 4 points back of a playoff spot.

In the 2022–23 season AKM made the VHL playoffs the first time and reached the quarterfinals by overcoming HC Lada Togliatti in seven games, but were then defeated in seven games by Rubin Tyumen.

In the 2023–24 season AKM reached the Petrov Cup finals, defeating Toros Neftekamsk, SKA-Neva and Yugra Khanty-Mansiysk on the way, but were swept by Neftyanik Almetyevsk in the final series.

In the 2024–25 season AKM placed 17th in the league again and missed the playoffs, finishing with the same 76 points in 64 games as teams that placed 14–16 and made the playoffs.

== Season-by-season record ==
Note: GP = Games played, W = Wins, L = Regulation losses, OTL = Overtime/shootout losses, Pts = Points, GF = Goals for, GA = Goals against

Season	GP	W	L	OTL	Pts	GF	GA	Finish	Playoffs
2021–22	52	25	24	3	53	144	147	17th, VHL	Did not qualify
2022–23	50	27	17	6	60	148	140	11th, VHL	Lost in Quarterfinals, 3–4 (Rubin Tyumen)
2023–24	56	39	13	4	82	162	95	4th, VHL	Lost in Petrov Cup Finals, 0-4 (Neftyanik Almetyevsk)
2024–25	56	35	23	6	72	187	162	17th, VHL	Did not qualify
