= List of Saryarka Karagandy seasons =

This is a list of seasons completed by the Saryarka Karagandy. This list documents the records and playoff results for all season of the Saryarka Karagandy have completed since their inception.

Champions	League leader

Note: GP = Games played, W = Wins, L = Losses, T = Ties, OTW = Overtime/shootout wins, OTL = Overtime/shootout losses, Pts = Points, GF = Goals for, GA = Goals against

League	Season	GP	W	L	T	OTW	OTL	Pts	GF	GA	Finish	Playoffs
KAZ	2006–07	24	13	8	1	1	1	43	118	82	4th	No playoffs held
KAZ	2007–08	24	16	7	1	0	0	49	132	69	3rd	Finished 6th in Final Round
KAZ	2008–09	5	2	3	—	0	0	6	17	13	4th	No playoffs held
RUS-2	2008–09	54	10	38	—	3	3	39	119	202	9th, Eastern	Did not qualify
KAZ	2009–10	56	39	13	—	3	1	124	218	95	1st	Won Semifinals, 3–0 (Gornyak Rudny); Kazakhstan Champions, 3–2 (Beibarys Atyrau)
KAZ	2010–11	54	39	6	—	6	3	132	220	111	1st	Won in Quarterfinals, 3–0 (Kazakhmys Satpaev); Lost in Semifinals, 3–0 (Barys-2 Astana); Won Bronze medal, 3–2 (Yertis Pavlodar)
KAZ	2011–12	54	37	10	—	3	6	121	227	120	2nd	Won in Quarterfinals, 3–0 (Gornyak Rudny); Lost in Semifinals, 4–2 (Yertis Pavlodar); Won Bronze medal, 3–0 (Arystan Temirtau)
VHL	2012–13	52	33	10	—	7	2	115	150	89	1st	Won First round, 3–0 (Dizel Penza); Won in Quarterfinals, 4–2 (Molot-Prikamye Perm); Won in Semifinals, 4–1 (Ariada-Akpars Volzhsk); Lost Finals, 4–3 (Toros Neftekamsk)
