= Sergei Rybin =

Russian ice hockey player

- Born: December 11, 1979 (age 45); Lipetsk, Soviet Union
- Height: 6 ft 2 in (188 cm)
- Weight: 187 lb (85 kg; 13 st 5 lb)
- Position: Forward
- Shot: Left
- Played for: HC Lipetsk; HC Ryazan
- NHL draft: Undrafted
- Playing career: 1996–2014

Sergei Rybin (born December 11, 1979) is a Russian former professional ice hockey player.

Rybin played 17 seasons in Russia with the HC Lipetsk and HC Ryazan. He retired following the 2013–14 season.

== Career statistics ==
			Regular season					Playoffs
Season	Team	League	GP	G	A	Pts	PIM	GP	G	A	Pts	PIM
1996–97	Stinol Lipetsk	Russia3	66	3	4	7	18	—	—	—	—	—
1997–98	HC Lipetsk	Russia2	2	0	0	0	0	—	—	—	—	—
1998–99	HC Lipetsk-2	Russia3	26	5	7	12	26	—	—	—	—	—
1999–00	HC Lipetsk-2	Russia3	30	7	15	22	16	—	—	—	—	—
2001–02	HC Lipetsk-2	Russia3	28	8	19	27	10	—	—	—	—	—
2002–03	HC Lipetsk	Russia2	20	3	4	7	12	—	—	—	—	—
2002–03	HC Lipetsk-2	Russia3	—	—	—	—	—	—	—	—	—	—
2003–04	HC Lipetsk	Russia2	56	10	9	19	26	—	—	—	—	—
2004–05	HC Lipetsk	Russia2	51	7	8	15	38	—	—	—	—	—
2005–06	HC Lipetsk	Russia2	8	0	0	0	4	—	—	—	—	—
2005–06	HC Lipetsk-2	Russia4	24	8	10	18	28	—	—	—	—	—
2006–07	HC Lipetsk	Russia3	67	35	46	81	78	—	—	—	—	—
2007–08	HC Lipetsk	Russia3	54	20	28	48	22	—	—	—	—	—
2008–09	HC Ryazan	Russia2	20	1	5	6	10	—	—	—	—	—
2009–10	HC Lipetsk	Russia2	28	0	6	6	10	—	—	—	—	—
2010–11	HC Lipetsk	Russia3	42	13	20	33	28	13	4	3	7	18
2011–12	HC Lipetsk	Russia3	43	16	17	33	48	—	—	—	—	—
2012–13	HC Lipetsk	Russia3	44	14	23	37	20	8	5	3	8	0
2013–14	HC Lipetsk	VHL	4	0	0	0	4	—	—	—	—	—
Russia2 totals			185	21	32	53	100	—	—	—	—	—
Russia3 totals			400	121	179	300	266	21	9	6	15	18
