= Petrov Cup =

Major hockey league trophy

The Petrov Cup, previously Bratina Cup (Russian: Кубок "Братина", Kubok "Bratina") is the trophy awarded to the winner of the play-off of the Major League (Vysshaya Liga) until 2010 and the trophy awarded to the winner of the play-off of the Major Hockey League (VHL) since the 2010–11 season. The names of winning clubs inscribed on the trophy are from the 1999–00 season onward. The trophy weights almost 19 kg (41.89 lbs).

The current 2021 holders of the trophy is Torpedo-Gorky, The team with the most Petrov/Bratina Cup championships, is Toros Neftekamsk, with three wins, who defeated HC Izhstal in the Best-of-seven final series 4 games to 2 in 2015.

== Winners ==
Season	Petrov Cup winner	Finalist	Final score	Regular season winner
2010–11	(Russia) Rubin Tyumen	(Russia) Neftyanik Almetyevsk	4–0	(Russia) Rubin Tyumen
2011–12	(Russia) Toros Neftekamsk	(Russia) Rubin Tyumen	4–1	(Russia) Rubin Tyumen
2012–13	(Russia) Toros Neftekamsk	(Kazakhstan) Saryarka Karagandy	4–3	(Kazakhstan) Saryarka Karagandy
2013–14	(Kazakhstan) Saryarka Karagandy	(Russia) Rubin Tyumen	4–2	(Russia) Toros Neftekamsk
2014–15	(Russia) Toros Neftekamsk	(Russia) Izhstal Izhevsk	4–2	(Kazakhstan) Saryarka Karagandy
2015–16	(Russia) Neftyanik Almetyevsk	(Russia) Izhstal Izhevsk	4–1	(Russia) THK Tver
2016–17	(Russia) Dynamo Balashikha	(Kazakhstan) Torpedo Ust-Kamenogorsk	4–0	(Kazakhstan) Torpedo Ust-Kamenogorsk
2017–18	(Russia) Dinamo Saint Petersburg	(Russia) SKA-Neva Saint Petersburg	4–2	(Russia) Dinamo Saint Petersburg
2018–19	(Kazakhstan) Saryarka Karagandy	(Russia) Rubin Tyumen	4–1	(Russia) SKA-Neva Saint Petersburg
2019–20	Cancelled due to the COVID-19 pandemic			(Russia) Zvezda Moscow
2020–21	(Russia) Yugra Khanty-Mansiysk	(Russia) Metallurg Novokuznetsk	4–1	(Russia) Yugra Khanty-Mansiysk
2021–22	(Russia) Rubin Tyumen	(Russia) Dinamo Saint Petersburg	4–1	(Russia) Yugra Khanty-Mansiysk
2022–23	(Russia) Khimik Voskresensk	(Russia) Sokol Krasnoyarsk	4–0	(Russia) Yugra Khanty-Mansiysk
2023–24	(Russia) Neftyanik Almetyevsk	(Russia) AKM Tula	4–0	(Russia) Molot-Prikamye Perm
2024–25	(Russia) Torpedo-Gorky	(Russia) Khimik Voskresensk	4–2	(Russia) Metallurg Novokuznetsk

== See also ==
- Gagarin Cup, KHL main trophy
- Kharlamov Cup, MHL main trophy
