= 2014–15 Supreme Hockey League season =

The 2014–2015 Supreme Hockey League season was the 5th season of Supreme Hockey League. It began on September 8, 2014 in Karagandy, Kazakhstan with a match between the finalists of the previous season, Saryarka Karaganda and Rubin Tyumen with Saryarka winning the opening cup holder match. The winner of the regular championship ahead of schedule was also a club from Kazakhstan.

== Clubs ==
In the season 2014/15 the participants of the SHL left three teams: "the Crystal" (Saratov), "Lada" (Togliatti) and "Titan" (Klin). But the participants of the SHL joined team "Bars".

The team of "Navy-Karelia" (Kondopoga) was renamed to "SKA-Karelia".

== Team's roster ==
At any time in the main team may be no more than 27 players, regardless of playing position at the age of 17 years and older, 2 of them are hockey player at the age of 21 years.

Any SHL team have the right to include in the entry form of the team no more than 9 players of hockey club KHL having with KHL team overall organizational and/or financial structure and no more than 4 players for clubs who have signed with KHL team agreement on sports cooperation.

foreign players in one team must be no more than 4 field players . The foreign goalkeeper in Russian teams was prohibited. The foreign team must have not less than five players citizens of the state that represents this club in the SHL.

On any given match a team can have no more than 22 players: 20 players, including 2 goalkeepers and 2 field players aged 17–20 years.

== Regular season ==
=== Format ===
In 2014/2015 season SHL took part 24 teams. For the 1-st teams play double-round tournament. Clubs are divided into six conditional fours on sporting and geographical basis, in which glean additional six matches (three games at "home" and "away"). Thus, in the first stage the teams will play 52 matches.

=== Standings ===
M	team	GP	V	VO	VB	LB	LО	L	G	±	S
1	(Kazakhstan) Saryarka	52	32	2	4	0	2	12	178–108	+70	110
2	(Russia) HC Izhstal	52	26	2	4	4	1	15	142–118	+24	95
3	(Russia) THK Tver	52	20	2	12	2	2	14	132–107	+25	92
4	(Russia) Molot-Prikamye Perm	52	23	3	7	0	0	19	139–116	+23	89
5	(Russia) HC Lipetsk	52	22	4	4	5	2	15	134–121	+13	89
6	(Russia) HC Ryazan	52	24	3	3	2	2	18	132–122	+10	88
7	(Russia) Buran Voronezh	52	23	1	4	5	0	19	129–129	0	84
8	(Russia) Toros Neftekamsk	52	22	3	1	8	2	16	138–120	+18	84
9	(Russia) Zauralie Kurgan	52	22	2	3	4	3	18	116–94	+22	83
10	(Russia) Dizel Penza	52	21	3	2	4	6	16	118–114	+4	83
11	(Russia) Rubin Tyumen	52	20	4	3	5	1	19	115–115	0	80
12	(Russia) Yermak Angarsk	52	21	2	3	1	3	22	116–127	–11	77
13	(Russia) Sputnik Nizhny Tagil	52	20	3	2	2	4	21	122–144	–22	76
14	(Russia) HC Kuban	52	20	2	4	1	2	23	136–133	+3	75
15	(Kazakhstan) Kazzinc-Torpedo	52	19	2	3	5	3	20	126–143	–17	75
16	(Russia) Chelmet Chelyabinsk	52	20	2	2	5	1	22	112–127	–15	74
17	(Russia) Dynamo Balashikha	52	17	3	5	3	1	23	141–146	–5	71
18	(Russia) Yuzhny Ural Orsk	52	18	2	3	3	3	23	127–144	–17	70
19	(Russia) Neftyanik Almetyevsk	52	18	0	4	4	4	22	140–140	0	70
20	(Russia) Ariada Volzhsk	52	15	4	3	7	2	21	119–129	–10	68
21	(Russia) SKA-Karelia	52	17	3	2	4	2	24	109–121	–12	67
22	(Russia) Sokol Krasnoyarsk	52	17	0	4	6	2	23	109–130	–21	67
23	(Russia) HC Sarov	52	13	0	5	7	1	26	109–130	–21	57
24	(Russia) JHC Bars	52	11	1	3	3	4	30	109–170	–61	48

=== Player's stats ===
==== Defenders ====
In the nomination "the Best defender in the SHL" by a vote of head coaches of clubs of the SHL defined contenders for the title of best players of the 2014/15 season. This table shows a summary of the regular season and the playoffs.

№	player	Club	Аmplua	GP	G	A	S	+/-	PIM
1	(Russia) Aleksander Ugolnikov	(Kazakhstan) Saryarka	D	65	8	23	31	+34	50
2	(Russia) Ilya Antonovsky	(Kazakhstan) Saryarka	D	64	11	17	28	+22	66
3	(Russia) Nikolay Zhilin	(Russia) Izhstal	D	48	9	10	19	+9	69

==== Forwards ====
№	player	club	amplua	M	G	A	S	+/–	Pt
1	(Russia) Denis Fakhrutdinov	(Russia) THK Tver	F	52	13	32	45	+20	50
2	(Russia) Oleg Lomako	(Kazakhstan) Saryarka	F	48	22	19	41	+24	22
3	(Russia) Aslan Raisov	(Russia) HC Kuban	F	50	17	20	37	–5	14

==== Goalkeepers ====
№	player	club	M	V	L	КN	%	0	T
1	(Russia) Gleb Evdokimov	(Russia) Zauralie Kurgan	33	15	10	94.2	1.54	4	1903:58
2	(Slovakia) Vladimir Kovac	(Kazakhstan) Saryarka	31	21	5	92.9	1.59	4	1733:08
3	(Russia) Sergei Khoroshun	(Russia) THK Tver	39	17	9	93.8	1.78	3	2295:42

== Playoffs ==
First round
1	(Kazakhstan) Saryarka	4
16	(Russia) Chelmet	2
3	(Russia) THK Tver	4
14	(Russia) HC Kuban	3
5	(Russia) HC Lipetsk	1
12	(Russia) Ermak	4
7	(Russia) Buran	2
10	(Russia) Dizel	4
2	(Russia) HC Izhstal	4
15	(Kazakhstan) Kazzinc-Torpedo	0
4	(Russia) Molot-Prikamye Perm	4
13	(Russia) Sputnik Nizhny Tagil	3
6	(Russia) HC Ryazan	1
11	(Russia) Rubin Tyumen	4
8	(Russia) Toros	4
9	(Russia) Zauralie Kurgan	2

Quarterfinals
1	(Kazakhstan) Saryarka	4
12	(Russia) Ermak	3
3	(Russia) THK Tver	4
10	(Russia) Dizel	3
2	(Russia) Izhstal	4
11	(Russia) Rubin Tyumen	2
4	(Russia) Molot-Prikamye	1
8	(Russia) Toros	4

Semifinals
1	(Kazakhstan) Saryarka	0
8	(Russia) Toros	4
2	(Russia) Izhstal	4
3	(Russia) THK Tver	0

Finals
8	(Russia) Toros	4
2	(Russia) Izhstal	2
