= HC Lada Togliatti =

Russian professional ice hockey team based in Togliatti, Russia

Lada Togliatti
- City: Tolyatti, Russia
- League: VHL 2010–2014, 2018–2023; KHL 2008–2010, 2014–2018, 2023–; RSL 1996–2008; IHL 1992–1996; Soviet League Class A 1991–1992; Soviet League Class A2 1979–1980, 1982–1991; Soviet League Class A3 1976–1979, 1980–1982
- Conference: Western
- Division: Bobrov
- Founded: 1976
- Home arena: Lada Arena (capacity: 6,034)
- Colours: Blue, Navy blue, white, red
- General manager: Sergei Gomolyako
- Head coach: Pavel Desyatkov
- Captain: Dmitri Kugryshev
- Affiliates: CSK VVS Samara (VHL); Ladya Togliatti (MHL)
- Website: hclada.ru

Franchise history
- HC Torpedo; 1976–1989; HC Lada Togliatti; 1989–present

HC Lada Togliatti (Russian: ХК Лада) is a professional ice hockey club based in Tolyatti, Russia. It is a member of the Bobrov Division in the Kontinental Hockey League (KHL).

Togliatti were participants in the inaugural season of the KHL in 2008–09. Due to a lack of a satisfactory arena, the KHL expelled the team and the team dropped one level to the Supreme Hockey League (VHL) for the 2010–11 season. They were allowed to rejoin the KHL for the 2014–15 season after the opening of the Lada Arena. However, the team was expelled again following the end of the 2017–18 season, and returned to the VHL. The team once again rejoined the KHL for the 2023–24 season. Lada initially played in the Kharlamov Division in the Eastern Conference, however with the withdrawal of HC Vityaz from the competition, Togliatti were moved to the Bobrov Division of the Western Conference prior to the 2025–26 season.

== History ==
- July 1976 - team was founded as Torpedo Togliatti.
- August 31, 1976 - first exhibition game against Dizelist Penza (final score was 3:3)
- 1991 - Lada enters the Highest division of the Soviet Championship League.
- April 1994 - Lada wins the International Hockey League's Russian Championship, becoming the first-ever team with non-Moscow origin to win the then-IHL Cup
- December 1994 - European Cup debut; silver medals won.
- December 1995 - Lada becomes a vice-champion of Spengler Cup after a loss in Final game to Canadian national team.

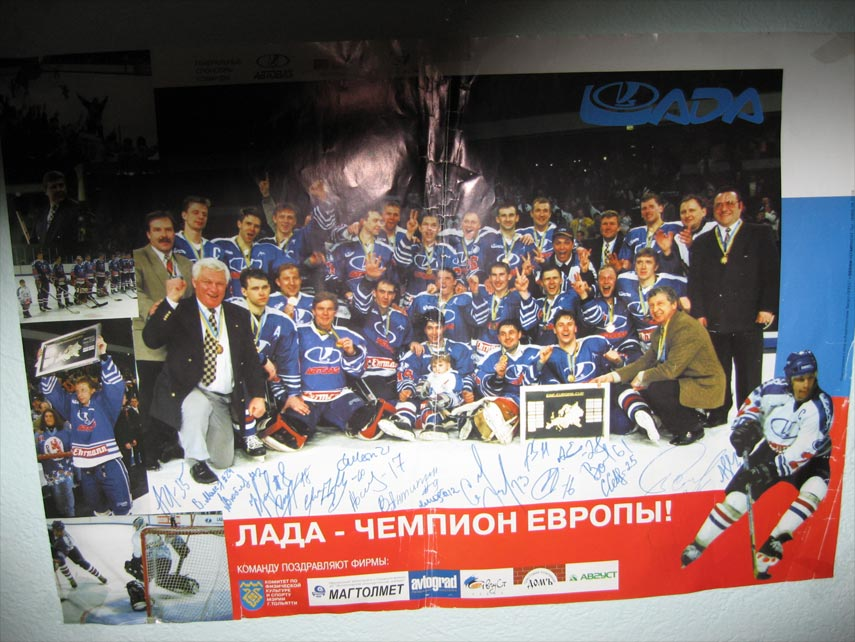
"Lada is European Cup Champion" poster

- December 30, 1996 - Lada wins European Cup.
- July 18, 2001 - Valeriy Postnikov quits team after having "attacks aimed at me by the media."
- November 2005 - due to financial troubles, 16 players leave the team. To continue regular season, Lada management uses the players from reserve team.
- January 2006 - Lada becomes first ever Russian team to win the IIHF Continental Cup.

== Honors ==
=== Champions ===
(gold) IHL Championship (2): 1994, 1996
(gold) IHL Cup (1): 1994
(gold) IIHF Continental Cup (1): 2006
(gold) European Cup (1): 1996

=== Runners-up ===
(silver) Russian Superleague (2): 1997, 2005
(bronze) Russian Superleague (2): 2003, 2004
(silver) IHL Championship (2): 1993, 1995
(silver) IHL Cup (2): 1993, 1995
(silver) European Cup (1): 1994.
(silver) Spengler Cup (1): 1995

== Season-by-season record ==
Note: GP = Games played, W = Wins, L = Regulation losses, OTL = Overtime/shootout losses, Pts = Points, GF = Goals for, GA = Goals against

=== 2008–2010 KHL seasons ===
| Season | GP | W | L | OTL | Pts | GF | GA | Finish | Playoffs |
|---|---|---|---|---|---|---|---|---|---|
| 2008–09 | 56 | 29 | 22 | 5 | 84 | 120 | 116 | 3rd, Kharlamov Division | Lost in Round of 16, 2–3 (CSKA Moscow) |
| 2009–10 | 56 | 16 | 31 | 9 | 55 | 115 | 173 | 6th, Kharlamov Division | Did not qualify |

=== 2010–2014 VHL seasons ===
| Season | GP | W | L | OTL | Pts | GF | GA | Finish | Playoffs |
|---|---|---|---|---|---|---|---|---|---|
| 2010–11 | 56 | 18 | 36 | 2 | 53 | 130 | 184 | 10th, Western Conference | Did not qualify |
| 2011–12 | 53 | 23 | 22 | 8 | 72 | 160 | 152 | 7th, Western Conference | Lost in Conference Quarterfinals, 1–3 (Dizel Penza) |
| 2012–13 | 52 | 29 | 17 | 6 | 88 | 149 | 130 | 9th, VHL | Lost in Quarterfinals, 1–4 (Toros Neftekamsk) |
| 2013–14 | 50 | 28 | 15 | 7 | 82 | 130 | 113 | 11th, VHL | Lost in Quarterfinals, 2–4 (HC Kuban) |

=== 2014–2018 KHL seasons ===
| Season | GP | W | L | OTL | Pts | GF | GA | Finish | Playoffs |
|---|---|---|---|---|---|---|---|---|---|
| 2014–15 | 60 | 24 | 32 | 4 | 68 | 130 | 158 | 6th, Kharlamov Division | Did not qualify |
| 2015–16 | 60 | 22 | 30 | 8 | 69 | 120 | 153 | 7th, Kharlamov Division | Did not qualify |
| 2016–17 | 60 | 21 | 32 | 7 | 65 | 146 | 180 | 7th, Kharlamov Division | Did not qualify |
| 2017–18 | 56 | 16 | 34 | 6 | 50 | 105 | 149 | 6th, Kharlamov Division | Did not qualify |

=== 2018–2023 VHL seasons ===
| Season | GP | W | L | OTL | Pts | GF | GA | Finish | Playoffs |
|---|---|---|---|---|---|---|---|---|---|
| 2018–19 | 52 | 38 | 15 | 3 | 79 | 171 | 120 | 5th, VHL | Lost in Round of 16, 1–3 (Sokol Krasnoyarsk) |
| 2019–20 | 54 | 36 | 14 | 4 | 76 | 164 | 123 | 1st, Division B | Lost in Round of 16, 3–4 (Neftyanik Almetyevsk) |
| 2020–21 | 50 | 23 | 20 | 7 | 53 | 134 | 136 | 18th, VHL | Did not qualify |
| 2021–22 | 52 | 34 | 14 | 4 | 72 | 164 | 128 | 7th, VHL | Lost in Quarterfinals, 0–4 (Rubin Tyumen) |
| 2022–23 | 50 | 31 | 14 | 5 | 67 | 150 | 120 | 6th, VHL | Lost in Round of 16, 3–4 (AKM Tula) |

=== 2023– KHL seasons ===
| Season | GP | W | L | OTL | Pts | GF | GA | Finish | Playoffs |
|---|---|---|---|---|---|---|---|---|---|
| 2023–24 | 68 | 32 | 22 | 14 | 78 | 165 | 170 | 5th, Kharlamov Division | Lost in Last 16, 1-4 (Avangard Omsk) |
| 2024–25 | 68 | 22 | 36 | 10 | 54 | 150 | 188 | 6th, Kharlamov Division | Did not qualify |
| 2025–26 | 68 | 20 | 41 | 7 | 47 | 157 | 240 | 4th, Bobrov Division | Did not qualify |

== Players ==
=== Current roster ===
Updated 7 April 2026.

| No. | Nat | Player | Pos | S/G | Age | Acquired | Birthplace |
|---|---|---|---|---|---|---|---|
| 84 | (Russia) | Andrei Altybarmakyan (A) | RW | L | 28 | 2023 | St. Petersburg, Russia |
| 64 | (Russia) | Maxim Belousov | D | L | 21 | 2025 | Yaroslavl, Russia |
| 60 | (Russia) | Ivan Bocharov | G | L | 31 | 2025 | Moscow, Russia |
| 29 | (Belarus) | Daniil Bokun | D | L | 30 | 2025 | Minsk, Belarus |
| 23 | (Russia) | Vladislav Chervonenko | RW | L | 27 | 2021 | Khabarovsk, Russia |
| 10 | (Russia) | Andrei Chivilev | F | L | 26 | 2025 | Nizhnekamsk, Russia |
| 75 | (Russia) | Danila Dyadenkin | LW | R | 26 | 2025 | Yaroslavl, Russia |
| 77 | (Russia) | Pavel Gogolev | LW | L | 26 | 2025 | Moscow, Russia |
| 94 | (Canada) | Tyler Graovac | C | L | 33 | 2025 | Brampton, Ontario, Canada |
| 63 | (Russia) | Yevgeni Groshev | LW | L | 26 | 2021 | Samara, Russia |
| 98 | (Slovakia) | Tomáš Jurčo | LW | L | 33 | 2025 | Košice, Czechoslovakia |
| 18 | (Russia) | Dmitri Kugryshev (C) | LW | R | 36 | 2023 | Balakovo, Russian SFSR |
| 44 | (Russia) | Alexander Lukin | D | L | 22 | 2025 | Moscow, Russia |
| 99 | (Russia) | Nikolai Makarov | D | L | 23 | 2025 | Perm, Russia |
| 66 | (Russia) | Nikita Mikhailov | C | R | 28 | 2023 | Tolyatti, Russia |
| 47 | (Russia) | Yegor Morozov | D | L | 23 | 2024 | Perm, Russia |
| 58 | (Russia) | Andrei Obidin | RW | L | 29 | 2025 | Krasnokamsk, Russia |
| 43 | (Russia) | Alexei Ozhgikhin | F | L | 28 | 2023 | Chelyabinsk, Russia |
| 25 | (Russia) | Ivan Romanov | LW | L | 28 | 2021 | Penza, Russia |
| 21 | (Russia) | Ivan Savchik | C | L | 26 | 2025 | Chelyabinsk, Russia |
| 13 | (Canada) | Riley Sawchuk (A) | C | R | 27 | 2025 | Prince Albert, Saskatchewan, Canada |
| 88 | (Russia) | Nikita Setdikov | RW | L | 31 | 2025 | Moscow, Russia |
| 1 | (Russia) | Alexander Trushkov | G | L | 30 | 2021 | Moscow, Russia |
| 22 | (Canada) | Colby Williams | D | R | 31 | 2025 | Regina, Saskatchewan, Canada |
| 8 | (Russia) | Artyom Zemchyonok | D | R | 35 | 2025 | Moscow, Russia |

== See also ==
- FC Lada Togliatti
