= Andrei Kirdyashov =

Russian professional ice hockey coach (born 1966)

- Born: Andrei Kirdyashov; January 28, 1966 (age 59); Almetievsk, RSFSR, USSR
- Occupation: ice hockey coach

Andrei Kirdyashov (Russian: Андрей Павлович Кирдяшов, born January, 1966) is a Russian professional ice hockey coach.

== Coaching career ==
- 1998-2001 Neftyanik Almetyevsk - assistant coach
- 2001-2008 Neftyanik Almetyevsk - head coach
- 2008-2010 Yuzhny Ural Orsk - head coach
- 2010-2011 Krylya Sovetov Moscow - head coach
- 2011-2013 HC Saryarka - head coach
