= Valeri Tushentsov =

Kazakhstani ice hockey player

- Born: July 31, 1961; Karaganda, Soviet Union
- Height: 5 ft 10 in (178 cm)
- Weight: 174 lb (79 kg; 12 st 6 lb)
- Position: Center
- Played for: Avtomobilist Karagandy; Bulat Temirtau; Mechel Chelyabinsk; Traktor Chelyabinsk; Gazovik Tyumen; Kristall Elektrostal; Neftyanik Almetievsk
- National team: Kazakhstan
- Playing career: 1979–2005

Valeri Tushentsov (Russian: Валерий Павлович Тушенцов, born July 31, 1961, in Karagandy, Kazakh SSR, Soviet Union) is a former professional Kazakhstani ice hockey player. Valeri Tushentsov is a former head coach of Saryarka Karagandy.

== Career ==
Valeri Tushentsov is the graduate of Karagandy ice hockey school. He started his career as a player of Stroitel Karagandy in 1993. In 1995, he invited to play in Kazakhstan National Hockey Team and played 7 games with them. In 1997, he signed a contract with Mechel Chelyabinsk and played in Russia before the end of his career.

== Coaching career ==
- 2001-2002 Gazovik Tyumen - assistant coach
- 2004-2007 Gazovik Univer - assistant coach
- 2007-2008 Gazovik Tyumen - assistant coach
- 2008-2009 HC Saryarka - head coach
