= Alexander Pankov =

- Born: November 17, 1991 (age 34) Ufa, Russian SFSR, Soviet Union
- Height: 6 ft 3 in (191 cm)
- Weight: 207 lb (94 kg; 14 st 11 lb)
- Position: Winger
- Shoots: Left
- VHL team Former teams: Toros Neftekamsk; Salavat Yulaev Ufa; Avtomobilist Yekaterinburg; Ak Bars Kazan; Traktor Chelyabinsk; HC Vityaz
- Playing career: 2009–present

Alexander Sergeevich Pankov (born November 17, 1991, Ufa) is a Russian professional ice hockey player, forward who currently plays for Toros Neftekamsk of the Supreme Hockey League (VHL).

== Playing career ==
Alexander Pankov is the pupil of the Ufa hockey. He began his professional career in 2009 in the club Tolpar Ufa of the Minor Hockey League. In his first season, he played 64 games, scored 41 (19+22) points and won the bronze medal of the tournament. In the next season he scored 33 (14+19) points in 49 games and won bronze medal of the Minor Hockey League again. He made his debut in the Kontinental Hockey League (KHL) on 22 December 2010 against Neftekhimik team from Nizhnekamsk. In his first season in the KHL he played 20 games and scored 6 (5+1) points, won the Gagarin Cup with the Salavat Yulaev.

He began the 2011/12 season in the club Toros from Neftekamsk (VHL) but in November he was called to the Salavat Yulaev. He returned to the Toros on December 22, 2011 and won the Bratina Cup. The management of Salavat Yulaev" has decided to extend the bilateral agreement with Pankov on May 3, 2012. In 2015 Pankov moved to the club Avtomobilist (Yekaterinburg)

== Awards and honours ==
- 2010, 2011 Bronze medal: Minor Hockey League
- 2011 Gagarin Cup Champion: Salavat Yulaev Ufa (KHL)
- 2012 Bratina Cup: Toros Neftekamsk (VHL)
