= 2011–12 Supreme Hockey League season =

2011–12 VHL season
- League: Russian Major League
- Sport: Ice hockey
- Duration: September 11, 2011 – April 15, 2012
- Teams: 23

Regular season
- Regular season champions: Rubin Tyumen

Play-offs

Bratina Cup
- Champions: Toros Neftekamsk
- Runners-up: Rubin Tyumen

VHL seasons
- ← 2010–11 2012–13 →

The 2011–12 VHL season was the second season of the Higher Hockey League, the second level of ice hockey in Russia. 23 teams participated in the league, and the Toros Neftekamsk won the championship.

== Team changes ==
- Krylya Sovetov Moscow ceased activities as a professional hockey team due to financial difficulties.
- Sokol Krasnoyarsk and Titan Klin of the lower level First League joined.
- Ukrainian HC Donbass became the second non-Russian club in the league.
- Lokomotiv Yaroslavl of the Kontinental Hockey League formed a VHL team after losing its senior roster in the 2011 Lokomotiv Yaroslavl plane crash.

== Regular season ==
=== Western Conference ===
	Team	GP	W	OTW	OTL	L	GF	GA	Pts
1.	HC Donbass	53	31	7	4	11	179	112	111
2.	Dizel Penza	53	26	8	4	15	167	136	98
3.	Lokomotiv Yaroslavl	22	13	0	3	6	68	47	42
4.	Neftyanik Almetyevsk	53	26	5	5	17	156	125	93
5.	Ariada-Akpars Volzhsk	53	20	7	10	16	156	159	84
6.	HC VMF St. Petersburg	53	20	6	6	21	142	134	78
7.	Lada Togliatti	53	18	5	8	22	160	152	72
8.	Titan Klin	53	18	5	6	24	136	157	70
9.	HC Sarov	53	15	5	5	28	128	166	60
10.	Dynamo Balashikha	53	11	9	2	31	132	173	53
11.	HC Ryazan	53	13	3	7	30	134	205	52
12.	Kristall Saratov	53	8	5	3	37	108	194	37

=== Eastern Conference ===
	Team	GP	W	OTW	OTL	L	GF	GA	Pts
1.	Rubin Tyumen	53	36	5	3	9	159	92	121
2.	Toros Neftekamsk	53	31	11	1	10	191	119	116
3.	Yuzhny Ural Orsk	53	29	4	7	13	146	114	102
4.	Ermak Angarsk	53	24	6	11	12	164	137	95
5.	Kazzinc-Torpedo	53	23	7	2	21	154	140	85
6.	Mechel Chelyabinsk	53	24	3	2	24	174	160	80
7.	Molot-Prikamie Perm	53	19	3	13	18	150	149	76
8.	Sputnik Nizhny Tagil	53	20	4	3	26	130	164	71
9.	Zauralie Kurgan	53	17	6	7	23	140	159	70
10.	Sokol Krasnoyarsk	53	14	6	5	28	139	178	59
11.	Izhstal Izhevsk	53	17	1	4	31	108	149	57

== Playoffs ==
1/8 finals
W1	HC Donbass	3
W8	Titan Klin	0
W2	Dizel Penza	3
W7	Lada Togliatti	1
W3	Lokomotiv Yaroslavl	3
W6	HC VMF St. Petersburg	2
W4	Neftyanik Almetyevsk	3
W5	Ariada-Akpars Volzhsk	2
E1	Rubin Tyumen	3
E8	Sputnik Nizhny Tagil	1
E2	Toros Neftekamsk	3
E7	Molot-Prikamie Perm	0
E3	Yuzhny Ural Orsk	2
E6	Mechel Chelyabinsk	3
E4	Ermak Angarsk	3
E5	Kazzinc-Torpedo	2

Quarterfinals
W1	HC Donbass	3
W4	Neftyanik Almetyevsk	0
W2	Dizel Penza	3
W3	Lokomotiv Yaroslavl	2
E1	Rubin Tyumen	3
E6	Mechel Chelyabinsk	2
E2	Toros Neftekamsk	3
E4	Ermak Angarsk	1

Semifinals
W1	HC Donbass	0
E2	Toros Neftekamsk	4
E1	Rubin Tyumen	4
W2	Dizel Penza	2

Final
E2	Toros Neftekamsk	4
E1	Rubin Tyumen	1
