= 2010–11 Supreme Hockey League season =

2010–11 VHL season
- League: Higher Hockey League
- Sport: Ice hockey
- Duration: September 11, 2010 – February 28, 2011
- Teams: 20

Regular season
- Regular season winner: (Russia) Rubin Tyumen
- Top scorer: (Russia) Evgeni Tunik; Toros Neftekamsk

Play-offs
- Western champions: (Russia) Neftyanik Almetyevsk
- Western runners-up: (Russia) Dizel Penza
- Eastern champions: (Russia) Rubin Tyumen
- Eastern runners-up: (Russia) Toros Neftekamsk

Bratina Cup
- Champions: (Russia) Rubin Tyumen
- Runners-up: (Russia) Neftyanik Almetyevsk

HHL seasons
- ← None 2011-12 →

The 2010–11 VHL season was the inaugural season of the Higher Hockey League. It started on September 11, 2010, and finished on February 28, 2011. 20 teams each played 56 games.

== Preseason ==
Compared to the last 2009–10 Higher Hockey League where a total of 27 teams competed in 3 divisions, there will be a total of 20 teams and two conferences in the 2010–11 season: Western and Eastern. 18 of the 27 teams of the 2009–10 season compete in the 2010–11 season. Gazovik Tyumen were renamed to Rubin Tyumen, while Rubin's junior team, playing in the MHL, has the name Gazovik. Two new teams in the league are Lada Togliatti, excluded from the KHL after the 2009–10 season, and Dynamo Tver, the farm team of UHC Dynamo. The fates of the 9 of the 27 teams that participated in the league in 2009–10 but no longer do in 2010–11 are various: HC Yugra joined the KHL for 2010–11, Khimik were suggested by VHL's management to take a one year break and joined the MHL under the name MHC Khimik, the team from Orenburg, formerly known under the name Gazprom-OGU, also joined the MHL under the name Belye Tigry, Rys dissolved, the remaining 5 (e.g. CSK VVS Samara) joined the Pervaya Liga. HC Lipetsk was admitted into the league for 2010–11, but the team had to withdraw before the start of the season due to financial difficulties. Lipetsk's place was taken by Krylya Sovetov Moscow on 12 August 2010.

== Regular season ==
During regular season teams are to play 4 games against teams from their conference (2 home and 2 away) and 2 games against teams from the opposite conference (1 home and 1 away). The first match of the regular season took place on September 11, 2010 in Perm. Molot-Prikamye's opponent was Toros Neftekamsk and the match ended 2 goals to 1 Toros' way after a shootout. Last games of the regular season will be held on 28 February 2011.

=== League standings ===
Source: vhl.khl.ru

Points are awarded as follows:

- 3 Points for a win in regulation ("W")
- 2 Points for a win in overtime ("OTW") or penalty shootout ("SOW")
- 1 Point for a loss in a penalty shootout ("SOL") or overtime ("OTL")
- 0 Points for a loss in regulation ("L")

=== Conference standings ===
Western Conference	GP	W	OTW	SOW	SOL	OTL	L	GF	GA	Pts
(Russia) Neftyanik Almetyevsk (AKB)	56	26	4	3	6	1	16	161	140	99
(Russia) HC Sarov (TOR)	56	25	3	6	2	0	20	168	149	95
(Russia) Dizel Penza (SEV)	56	23	2	3	8	1	19	132	123	88
(Russia) HC VMF St. Petersburg (SKA)	56	22	2	2	5	2	23	142	148	81
(Russia) PHC Krylya Sovetov (SPA)	56	19	3	7	1	0	26	163	172	78
(Russia) HC Ryazan (ATL)	56	19	1	4	6	3	23	153	169	76
(Russia) Kristall Saratov	56	17	0	3	2	5	29	149	183	64
(Russia) Ariada-Akpars Volzhsk (NEF)	56	18	0	0	4	4	30	138	193	62
(Russia) HC Dynamo Tver (DMOW)	56	13	3	5	3	2	30	150	190	60
(Russia) Lada Togliatti	56	15	1	2	2	0	36	130	184	53

Eastern Conference	GP	W	OTW	SOW	SOL	OTL	L	GF	GA	Pts
(Russia) Rubin Tyumen	56	38	2	2	2	0	12	172	104	124
(Russia) Toros Neftekamsk (UFA)	56	34	1	5	3	3	10	183	114	120
(Russia) Molot-Prikamye Perm	56	25	3	4	6	1	17	162	156	96
(Russia) Yuzhny Ural Orsk (MAG)	56	25	3	3	5	2	18	135	132	94
(Russia) Ermak Angarsk (NOV)	56	27	1	0	3	1	24	168	139	87
(Kazakhstan) Kazzinc-Torpedo	56	23	1	4	6	1	21	151	153	86
(Russia) Zauralie Kurgan (SIB)	56	20	2	8	3	3	20	153	147	86
(Russia) Sputnik Nizhny Tagil	56	20	4	5	0	3	24	149	144	81
(Russia) Mechel Chelyabinsk (TRA)	56	20	1	4	7	4	20	168	174	81
(Russia) Izhstal Izhevsk	56	17	1	6	2	2	28	119	132	69

=== League leaders ===
Source: vhlru.ru

Goals	(Russia) Alexander Zhurun (Tyumen)	29
Assists	(Russia) Maxim Zhapov (Almetyevsk)	31
Points	(Russia) Evgeni Tunik (Neftekamsk)	51
Shots	(Russia) Ruslan Bernik (Moscow)	170
Plus–minus	(Russia) Sergey Zhurikov (Tyumen)	+24
Penalty minutes	(Russia) Igor Golovkov (St.Peterburg)	154
Wins (Goaltenders)	(Russia) Nikita Davydov (Neftekamsk)	34
Goals against average	(Russia) Stanislav Galimov (Almetyevsk)	1.46
Save percentage	(Russia) Alexander Sudnitsin (Tyumen)	94.7
Shutouts	(Russia) Alexander Sudnitsin (Tyumen)	8

Goaltenders: minimum 15 games played

== Playoffs ==
The play-offs will feature 8 best teams of the Western Conference of the regular season and 8 best teams of the Eastern Conference of the regular season. The play-offs start 5 March 2011 and are to end on April 27, 2011 if match 7 of the final series is to be played. Conference quarter-finals and semi-finals are a best-of-five series, while the Conference finals and VHL finals are a best-of-seven series.

Conference Quarter-Finals (best-of-5)
1	Rubin	3
8	Sputnik	1
2	Toros	3
7	Zauralie	1
3	Molot-Prikamye	3
6	Kazzinc-Torpedo	2
4	Yuzhny Ural	2
5	Ermak	3
1	Neftyanik	3
8	Ariada-Akpars	0
2	HC Sarov	1
7	Kristall	3
3	Dizel	3
6	HC Ryazan	0
4	HC VMF	3
5	Krylya Sovetov	2

Conference Semi-Finals (best-of-5)
1	Rubin	3
5	Ermak	0
2	Toros	3
3	Molot-Prikamye	0
1	Neftyanik	3
7	Kristall	0
3	Dizel	3
4	HC VMF	0

Conference Finals (best-of-7)
Eastern Conference
1	Rubin	4
2	Toros	1
Western Conference
1	Neftyanik	4
3	Dizel	3

Bratina Cup Finals (best-of-7)
1	Rubin	4
1	Neftyanik	0

Bratina Cup Finals series logo

=== Playoffs leaders ===
Source: vhlru.ru

Goals	(Russia) Rustam Shangaraev (Almetyevsk)	8
Assists	(Russia) Vladimir Karpor (Tyumen)	9
Points	(Russia) Daniel Nasybullin (Almetyevsk)	14
Shots	(Russia) Andrei Kuzmin (Sarov)	58
Plus–minus	(Russia) Sergei Serebryakov (Almetyevsk)	+10
Penalty minutes	(Russia) Andrew Ankudinov (Neftekamsk)	56
Wins (Goaltenders)	(Russia) Alexander Sudnitsin (Tyumen)	14
Goals against average	(Russia) Alexander Sudnitsin (Tyumen)	1.44
Save percentage	(Russia) Alexander Sudnitsin (Tyumen)	95.2
Shutouts	(Russia) Alexander Sudnitsin (Tyumen)	4

Goaltenders: minimum 5 games played
