= Ilnur Gizatullin =

Russian ice hockey player (born 1969)

- Born: May 13, 1969 (age 55); Kazan, Russian SFSR, Soviet Union
- Height: 6 ft 1 in (185 cm)
- Weight: 203 lb (92 kg; 14 st 7 lb)
- Position: Left wing
- Shot: Left
- Played for: SK Uritskogo Kazan; SKA Sverdlovsk; Metallurg Serov; Neftyanik Almetievsk; Itil Kazan; TAN Kazan; Ak Bars Kazan; Neftekhimik Nizhnekamsk; HC CSKA Moscow; HKMK Bled; Neftyanik Leninogorsk; Khimik Voskresensk; Ariada Volzhsk
- Playing career: 1986–2008

Ilnur Gizatullin (born May 13, 1969) is a Soviet and Russian former professional ice hockey forward. He is a one-time Russian Champion. After completing his career as a player, he became a coach.

== Awards and honors ==
Award	Year
RSL
Winner (Ak Bars Kazan)	1998
