= Pavel Kanarsky =

Russian ice hockey player

- Born: February 25, 1982 (age 43); Moscow, RSFSR, USSR
- Height: 6 ft 0 in (183 cm)
- Weight: 198 lb (90 kg; 14 st 2 lb)
- Position: Defence
- Shoots: Left
- VHL team Former teams: Metallurg Novokuznetsk; Krylia Sovetov Moscow; Dizel Penza; THK Tver; Kristall Saratov; SKA Saint Petersburg; Severstal Cherepovets; Metallurg Novokuznetsk; Ermak Angarsk
- NHL draft: Undrafted
- Playing career: 2004–present

Pavel Kanarsky (Russian: Павел Алексеевич Канарский; born February 25, 1982) is a Russian professional ice hockey player. He currently plays for Metallurg Novokuznetsk in the Kontinental Hockey League (KHL).

Kanarsky made his Kontinental Hockey League debut playing with Severstal Cherepovets during the inaugural 2008–09 KHL season.
