= Vadim Epanchintsev =

Russian ice hockey player (born 1976)

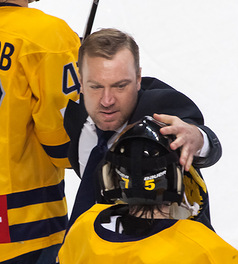
- Born: March 16, 1976 (age 50) Orsk, Russian SFSR
- Height: 5 ft 11 in (180 cm)
- Weight: 203 lb (92 kg; 14 st 7 lb)
- Position: Centre
- Shot: Left
- Played for: Spartak Moscow; Cleveland Lumberjacks; Metallurg Novokuznetsk; Severstal Cherepovets; Ak Bars Kazan; Atlant Moscow Oblast; CSKA Moscow; Dynamo Moscow; Neftekhimik Nizhnekamsk
- NHL draft: 55th overall, 1994; Tampa Bay Lightning
- Playing career: 1992–2011

Vadim Sergeevich Epanchintsev (Russian: Вадим Сергеевич Епанчинцев; born 16 March 1976) is a Russian former professional ice hockey player and coach. He most recently was the head coach for AKM Tula of the All-Russian Hockey League (VHL).

== Career statistics ==
			Regular season					Playoffs
Season	Team	League	GP	G	A	Pts	PIM	GP	G	A	Pts	PIM
1992–93	Yuzhny Ural Orsk	Russia2	35	5	4	9	10	—	—	—	—	—
1993–94	HC Spartak Moscow	Russia	46	6	5	11	16	3	0	1	1	0
1994–95	HC Spartak Moscow	Russia	43	4	8	12	24	—	—	—	—	—
1995–96	HC Spartak Moscow	Russia	51	20	12	32	28	4	0	2	2	4
1996–97	HC Spartak Moscow	Russia	38	10	8	18	74	—	—	—	—	—
1996–97	SAK Moscow	Russia3	1	0	1	1	0	—	—	—	—	—
1997–98	Cleveland Lumberjacks	IHL	34	3	6	9	18	—	—	—	—	—
1997–98	Hampton Roads Admirals	ECHL	25	5	10	15	44	3	0	1	1	0
1998–99	Metallurg Novokuznetsk	Russia	38	9	19	28	12	6	0	0	0	10
1999–00	Metallurg Novokuznetsk	Russia	29	13	14	27	22	14	3	2	5	8
2000–01	Severstal Cherepovets	Russia	43	7	13	20	38	9	1	4	5	6
2001–02	Severstal Cherepovets	Russia	47	17	24	41	20	4	1	2	3	0
2002–03	Severstal Cherepovets	Russia	50	11	29	40	16	12	4	2	6	6
2003–04	Ak Bars Kazan	Russia	49	11	27	38	40	4	0	0	0	4
2004–05	Ak Bars Kazan	Russia	45	8	20	28	38	4	0	0	0	4
2005–06	Khimik Mytishchi	Russia	32	3	14	17	44	—	—	—	—	—
2006–07	HC CSKA Moscow	Russia	53	13	32	45	82	12	2	6	8	20
2007–08	HC CSKA Moscow	Russia	47	16	25	41	38	1	0	1	1	0
2008–09	HC CSKA Moscow	KHL	44	6	24	30	34	8	0	2	2	8
2009–10	HC Dynamo Moscow	KHL	36	2	11	13	32	—	—	—	—	—
2009–10	Atlant Mytishchi	KHL	14	2	13	15	8	4	0	3	3	2
2010–11	HC Neftekhimik Nizhnekamsk	KHL	2	0	0	0	2	—	—	—	—	—
2010–11	Atlant Mytishchi	KHL	22	5	12	17	22	6	0	0	0	6
ECHL totals			25	5	10	15	44	3	0	1	1	0
IHL totals			34	3	6	9	18	—	—	—	—	—
Russia totals			611	148	250	398	492	73	11	20	31	62
KHL totals			118	15	60	75	98	18	0	5	5	16
