= Yachmenev =

Yachmenev is a surname. Notable people with the surname include:

- Aleksey Yachmenev (1866–1937), Native American chief
- Denis Yachmenev (born 1984), Russian ice hockey player, brother of Vitali
- Vitali Yachmenev (born 1975), Russian ice hockey player
