= Aleksandr Shibayev =

Aleksandr Shibayev may refer to:

- Aleksandr Shibayev (footballer) (born 1961), Russian football coach and former player
- Aleksandr Shibaev (ice hockey) (born 1987), Russian ice hockey player
- Alexander Shibaev (table tennis) (born 1990), Russian table tennis player
