= Antonovsky =

Antonovsky is a Slavic surname according to Slavic naming conventions. Notable people with this name include the following:

- Aaron Antonovsky (1923–1994), American sociologist
- Ilya Antonovsky (born 1989), Russian ice hockey player
