= Aleksandr Shibaev (ice hockey) =

Russian ice hockey player

- Born: 18 January 1987 (age 39) Moscow, Russian SFSR, Soviet Union
- Height: 6 ft 1 in (185 cm)
- Weight: 179 lb (81 kg; 12 st 11 lb)
- Position: Centre
- Shot: Left
- Played for: Dnepr Kherson; HC MVD; OHK Dynamo Moscow; Vityaz Podolsk
- Playing career: 2006–2020

Aleksandr Aleksandrovich Shibaev (Russian: Александр Александрович Шибаев; born 18 April 1987) is a Russian former ice hockey centre. He mainly played in the Russian Supreme Hockey League, but also played in the Kontinental Hockey League for HC MVD, OHK Dynamo Moscow and Vityaz Podolsk.
