= Saryarka Karagandy =

Kazakhstan ice hockey team

- City: Karaganda, Kazakhstan
- League: Kazakhstan Hockey Championship
- Founded: 25 July 2006
- Home arena: Karagandy-Arena
- Colours: Yellow and Black
- General manager: Mikhail Pikalov
- Head coach: Dmitry Kramarenko
- Captain: Ilya Antonovsky
- Affiliate: Karmet Karagandy (JHL)
- Website: saryarka-hc.kz

Championships
- Kazakhstan: 1 (2010)
- Bratina Cups: 2 (2014, 2019)

Hockey Club Saryarka (Kazakh: Сарыарқа хоккей клубы; Saryarqa Hokei Kluby; Russian: Хоккейный клуб Сарыарка), commonly referred as Saryarka Karagandy, is a professional ice hockey team based in Karaganda, Kazakhstan. They Currently play in the Kazakhstan Hockey Championship.

== History ==
Saryarka was formed on 25 July 2006 by the Karagandy Region Municipality and Regional Department of Physical Culture and Sports. The team name "Saryarka" comes from given name of the territory located in the central part of Kazakhstan.

== Season-by-season record ==
This is a partial list of the last five seasons completed by Saryarka Karagandy. For the full season-by-season history, see List of Saryarka Karagandy seasons.

Note: GP = Games played, W = Wins, L = Losses, OTW = Overtime/shootout wins, OTL = Overtime/shootout losses, Pts = Points, GF = Goals for, GA = Goals against

Season	GP	W	L	OTW	OTL	Pts	GF	GA	Regular season	Playoffs
2009–10	56	39	13	3	1	124	218	95	1st, Championship	Kazakhstan Champions, 3–2 (Beibarys Atyrau)
2010–11	54	39	6	6	3	132	220	111	1st, Championship	Lost in Semifinals, 0–3 (Nomad Astana)
2011–12	54	37	10	3	6	121	227	120	2nd, Championship	Lost in Semifinals, 2–4 (Yertis Pavlodar)
2012–13	52	33	10	7	2	115	160	89	1st, VHL	Lost in Finals, 3–4 (Toros Neftekamsk)
2013–14	50	23	12	11	4	95	155	104	4th, VHL	Won Bratina Cup, 4–2 (Rubin Tyumen)
2014–15	52	32	12	6	14	110	178	108	1st, VHL	Lost in Semifinals, 0–4 (Toros Neftekamsk)
2015–16	49	22	13	7	7	87	133	103	8th, VHL	Lost in Quarterfinals, 2–4 (Toros Neftekamsk)
2016–17	50	29	11	5	5	102	128	70	3rd, VHL	Lost in Semifinals, 0–4 (Toros Neftekamsk)
2017–18	52	28	12	5	7	101	x	x	4th, VHL	Lost in 1/8 Finals, 0–4 (Metallurg Nk)
2018–19	56	27	18	7	4	72	x	x	9th, VHL	Won Bratina Cup, 4–1 (Rubin Tyumen)
2019–20	54	24	15	8	7	71	x	x	5th, VHL Conf. 2	Lost in 1/8 Finals, 4–2 (SKA Neva St. Petersburg)
2020–21	48	29	11	5	3	100	x	x	2nd, Kazakhstan Hockey Championship	Kazakhstan Champions, 4–2 (Arlan Kokshetau)

== Achievements ==
Bratina Cup

- Winner (1) 2014, 2019

Kazakhstan Hockey Championship:

- Winner (3): 2009–10, 2020–21, 2021–22
- 3rd place (2): 2010–11, 2011–12

Pervaya Liga – Siberia and Far East Zone

- Winner (1): 2007–08

== Leaders ==
=== Team captains ===
- Maxim Orlov 2011–12
- Pavel Kanarsky 2012–13
- Jan Homer 2013–14
- Alexander Vasiliev 2014–15
- Maxim Belyaev 2015-16
- Smolyaninov Vitaly 2016-17
- Ilya Antonovsky 2016-present

=== Head coaches ===
- Galym Mambetaliyev 2006–08
- Valeri Tushentsov 2008–09
- Oleg Bolyakin 2009–11
- Andrei Kirdyashov 2011–13
- Evgeni Zinoviev 2013
- Dusan Gregor 2013–14
- Alexei Fetisov 2014
- Leonids Tambijevs 2014–15
- Andrei Potaichuk 2015
- Vadim Epanchintsev 2015-17
- Aleksandr Sokolov 2017
- Dmitry Kramarenko 2017–present
