= 2013–14 Supreme Hockey League season =

Hockey season

2013-2014 VHL season — the 4th season of the Supreme Hockey League championship. It began on September 8, 2013, in Neftekamsk, with an opening match between Toros and Saryarka. The winner of the match and the holder of the Opening Cup was Toros. On April 28, 2014, Saryarka won in the sixth game of the final series of Rubin Tyumen and became the winner of the Cup Bratina.

== Regular season ==
=== Format ===
27 VHL teams were placed into one group. During the regular season, each team played against every other team twice — one home and away. All teams played a total of 50 matches.

=== Playoffs ===
First round
1 | (Russia) Toros Neftekamsk | 4
16 | (Russia) Sokol Krasnoyarsk | 0
3 | (Russia) Rubin Tyumen | 4
14 | (Russia) Ariada Volzhsk | 2
7 | (Russia) Yuzhny Ural Orsk | 4
10 | (Russia) Neftyanik Almetyevsk | 1
2 | (Russia) Molot-Prikamye Perm | 4
15 | (Russia) Titan Klin | 0
4 | (Kazakhstan) Saryarka | 4
13 | (Russia) Dynamo Balashikha | 1
5 | (Russia) HC Kuban | 4
12 | (Russia) Lada Togliatti | 2
6 | (Russia) Dizel Penza | 4
11 | (Kazakhstan) Kazzinc-Torpedo | 2
8 | (Russia) THK Tver | 0
9 | (Russia) Buran Voronezh | 4

Quarterfinals
1 | (Russia) Toros Neftekamsk | 4
9 | (Russia) Buran Voronezh | 3
2 | (Russia) Molot-Prikamye Perm | 4
7 | (Russia) Yuzhny Ural Orsk | 2
3 | (Russia) Rubin Tyumen | 4
6 | (Russia) Dizel Penza | 1
4 | (Kazakhstan) Saryarka | 4
5 | (Russia) HC Kuban | 0

Semifinals
1 | (Russia) Toros Neftekamsk | 0
4 | (Kazakhstan) Saryarka | 4
2 | (Russia) Molot-Prikamye Perm | 1
3 | (Russia) Rubin Tyumen | 4

Finals
3 | (Russia) Rubin Tyumen | 2
4 | (Kazakhstan) Saryarka | 4
