= Titan Klin =

Russian ice hockey team

- City: Klin, Moscow Oblast, Russia
- League: VHL
- Conference: Western
- Founded: 1953
- Home arena: Valeri Kharlamov Ice Palace (1,500 seats)
- Colours
- Head coach: Andrei Amelin
- Affiliates: Severstal Cherepovets; MHK Klin (MHL-B)

Titan Klin was an ice hockey team in Klin, Russia. They play in the VHL, the second level of Russian ice hockey. The club was established in 1991 as a successor of a minor amateur team Khimik Klin that existed since 1953.

Titan played in the First League starting with 2003 until it joined the VHL in the 2011–2012 season. Titan became a farm club of Severstal Cherepovets in 2012. Previously it was affiliated with Atlant Moscow Oblast.

== Winner ==
- Eastern European Hockey Cup (EEHC) – 2005/2006
