= Toros Neftekamsk =

- City: Neftekamsk, Russia
- League: VHL
- Conference: 2
- Division: C
- Founded: 1988
- Home arena: Neftekamsk Ice Palace (2,000 seats)
- Colours
- General manager: Alexander Nikolaev
- Head coach: Ravil Khaidarov
- Affiliates: Salavat Yulaev Ufa (KHL); Tolpar Ufa (MHL)
- Website: http://www.hctoros.ru

Franchise history
- 1988–1990: Torpedo Neftekamsk
- 1990–: Toros Neftekamsk

Toros Neftekamsk is an ice hockey team in Neftekamsk, Russia. They play in the Supreme Hockey League (VHL). The Russian word "toros" means hummock.

== History ==
In 1984, the club was founded under the name "Torpedo" and in 1988, Neftekamsk hockey players led by Sergey Voikin won the right to participate in the Russian Hockey Championship in the Volga region.

The opening of the Ice Palace served as an impetus for the further development of the club. On May 2, 2006, President of the Republic of Bashkortostan Rakhimov Murtaza laid the foundation stone of the future 2,000-seat ice arena. On New Year's Eve 2007, the grand opening of the Ice Palace took place.

In the youth sports school of the Toros club, seven age groups of children play hockey. Five age groups of youth hockey schools, as well as the masters teams, participate in the Russian Championship of the Volga region zone, take part in various tournaments "Golden Puck RB", the All-Russian tournament "Golden Puck". In the 2006/07 season, the Toros-2 team won silver medals in the regular championship and in the final won the Champions Cup of the Volga Federal District, beating Orenburg — Gazprom in the series.

In the 2009-2010 season, Toros won silver medals in the Russian championship among major league teams. The team was led to victory by head coach Vasily Chizhov and senior coach Alfred Yunusov. Toros-2, led by senior coach Alexander Kulyashkin, became the bronze medalist of the Russian championship among the first league clubs of the Volga region.

On September 11, 2010, HC Toros, as the silver medalist of last year's season, took part in the historic opening match of the Supreme Hockey League and defeated the Molot-Prikamye club. Evgeny Tunik became the author of the first abandoned puck in the first season for Toros in the VHL.

In the regular season of the first season of the 2010/2011 VHL, the team took second place, losing to Rubin. In the semifinals of the playoffs, Neftekamsk also lost to Rubin and won the bronze medals.

On December 1, 2011, Ruslan Suleymanov became the head coach of Toros, previously Vasily Chizhov, who was invited to Salavat Yulaev. In the championship, Toros took 2nd place, losing 5 points to Rubin. On April 25, 2012, in the final series with Rubin, Toros became the champion of the Supreme Hockey League of the season for the first time and the winner of the Bratina Cup. Stanislav Golovanov was named the most valuable player of the playoffs.

Toros finished the 2012-13 regular season in third place. In the final of the VHL playoffs, he defeated Saryarka in 7 matches and became a two-time VHL champion.

In the 2013-14 season, Toros won the regular season of the VHL. In the playoff games, he won silver medals at the VHL Championship, finishing in the semifinals in a series with Saryarka.

In the 2014/15 season, Toros finished the regular season in 8th place. The club was headed by Konstantin Polozov, who had previously coached MHC Batyr. Under the leadership of the new coaching staff, Toros reached the finals, and beat Izhstal in six matches, winning the main trophy of the VHL — Bratina and the gold medals of the championship.

Following the results of the 2015/16 regular season, Toros took third place and was one of the favorites of the playoff games, where he finished at the quarterfinals stage, losing to Saryarka.

In the 2016/17 VHL regular season, Toros took fifth place. The team finished the playoffs in the first round, losing the series to Dynamo from St. Petersburg. At the end of the season, the captain of Toros, Stanislav Golovanov, was recognized as the best striker, the best scorer and the best player in the VHL.
