= HC Sarov =

- City: Sarov, Nizhny Novgorod Oblast, Russia
- League: VHL
- Founded: 2002
- Home arena: Sarov Ice Palace (1,200 seats)
- Colours
- Head coach: Nikolai Voyevodin
- Website: http://www.hcsarov.ru/

HC Sarov is an ice hockey team in Sarov, Russia. They play in the Supreme Hockey League, the second level of Russian ice hockey. The club was founded in 2002.
