= Dynamo Balashikha =

- City: Balashikha, Moscow Oblast, Russia
- League: VHL
- Founded: 2010
- Folded: 2017
- Home arena: Balashikha Arena (6,500 seats)
- Colours
- Head coach: Alexander Savchenkov
- Affiliates: Dynamo Moscow (KHL); MHC MVD (MHL)
- Website: http://vhl.dynamo.ru/

Dynamo Balashikha was an ice hockey team in Balashikha, Russia. They played in the VHL, the second level of Russian ice hockey. The club was founded in 2010 as an affiliate of Dynamo Moscow of the Kontinental Hockey League and replaced HC MVD as a main ice hockey team of Balashikha.

== Notable players ==
- Alexei Sopin (2011–15)
- Aleksandr Shibaev (2012–15)
- Klim Kostin (2016–17)
