= HC Kuban =

Russian ice hockey team

Kuban Krasnodar
- City: Krasnodar, Russia
- League: VHL
- Founded: 2012
- Folded: 2015
- Home arena: Sports Palace Kuban (2,831 seats)
- Colours
- Head coach: Vladimir Kolpakov
- Affiliate: HC Sochi (KHL)
- Website: hc-kuban.ru

Kuban Krasnodar was an ice hockey team in Krasnodar, Russia. They played in the VHL, the second level of Russian ice hockey until 2015. It was founded in 2012 and became affiliated with HC Sochi of the KHL since the inaugural season.

== Gallery ==
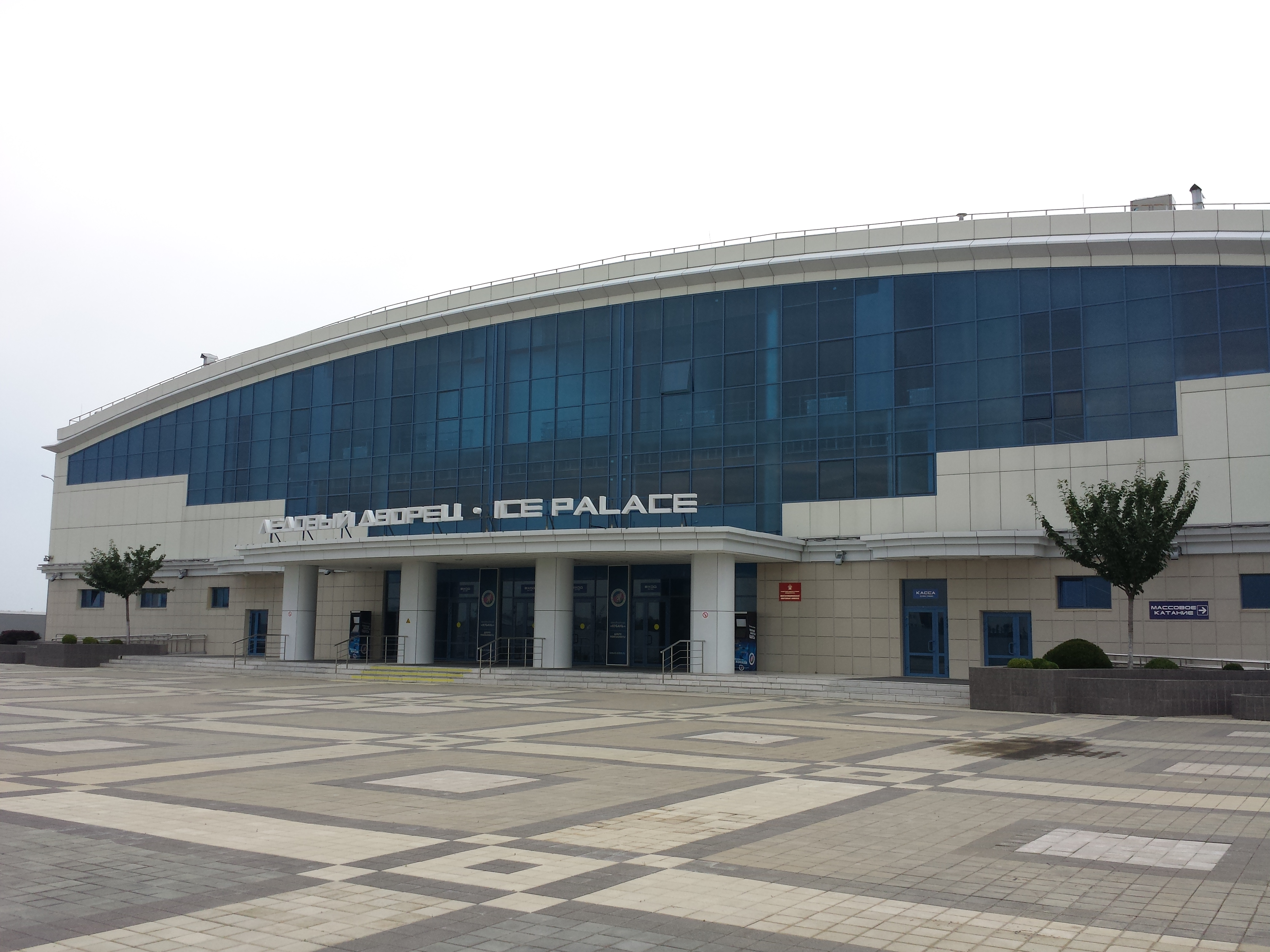
HC Kuban's home arena
