= THK Tver =

- City: Tver, Russia
- League: VHL
- Founded: 1952
- Folded: 2017
- Home arena: Sports Complex Yubileiny (2,000 seats)
- Colours: Blue, White
- Affiliate: Tverichi Tver (NMHL)
- Website: tver-thk.ru

THK (Tverskoi Hokkeiny Klub — Tver Hockey Club) was a minor professional ice hockey club in Tver, Russia. It was founded in 1949 and subsequently reestablished in 2009. The team played in the Supreme Hockey League, the second level of Russian ice hockey until 2017.

== History ==
The club was founded as SKA MVO Tver in 1949. They have gone through a number of name changes during their history.

- 1952 to 1990: SKA MVO Tver
- 1990 to 1992: Egida Tver
- 1992 to 1994: Mars Tver
- 1994 to 1995: Zvezda Tver
- 1995 to 2004, 2005 to 2017: THK Tver
- 2004 to 2005: HK MVD-THK Tver
