= SKA-VMF =

- City: Saint Petersburg, Russia
- League: VHL 2010–present: Vysshaya Liga 2008–2010
- Home arena: Yubileyny Sports Palace (capacity: 7,000)
- Colours
- Head coach: Evgeny Ketov
- Affiliates: SKA Saint Petersburg (KHL); SKA-1946 (MHL); SKA Academy (MHL)
- Website: vmf.ska.ru

Franchise history
- 2008–2013: VMF St. Petersburg
- 2013–2014: VMF Karelia
- 2014–2015: SKA-Karelia
- 2015–2025: SKA-Neva
- 2025-present: SKA-VMF

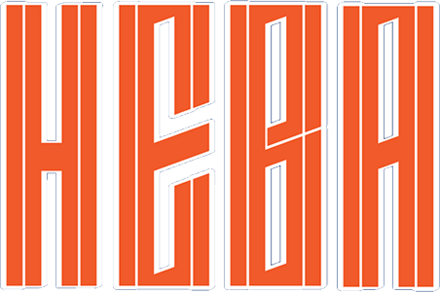
SKA-Neva logo

SKA-VMF St. Petersburg (Russian: Хоккейный Клуб СКА-Нева) is a Russian professional ice hockey team playing in the VHL, the second level of Russian ice hockey. The club was founded as VMF St. Petersburg in 2008 in Saint Petersburg as a farm club of the KHL team SKA Saint Petersburg. After failing to attract the audience in Petersburg, the franchise was relocated to Kondopoga, Karelia during the 2012–2013 VHL season. Starting with the 2013–14 season, the team changed the name to VMF Karelia. In the following 2014–15 season, it was changed to SKA-Karelia. In May 2015, the club returned to Saint Petersburg and was renamed to "SKA-Neva". Before the 2025-26 season, the team was rebranded again and received its current name.
