= Ariada Volzhsk =

Ariada-NH Volzhsk
- City: Volzhsk, Mari El, Russia
- League: VHL
- Founded: 1996
- Folded: 2017
- Home arena: Ariada Ice Palace (2,250 seats)
- Colours
- Head coach: Ilnur Gizatullin
- Affiliate: HC Neftekhimik Nizhnekamsk (KHL)
- Website: http://www.ariada-akpars.ru/

Franchise history
- 2013–2016: Ariada Volzhsk
- 2016–2017: Ariada-NH

Ariada-NH (Russian: Ариада-НХ) was a professional ice hockey team based in Volzhsk, Mari El Republic, Russia. They played in the Central Division of the VHL. In 2017, they left the league due to financial difficulties and ultimately disbanded. From 2013 to 2016, team's name was Ariada Volzhsk.
