= Yuzhny Ural Orsk =

Russian ice hockey team

- City: Orsk, Orenburg Oblast, Russia
- League: VHL 2010–present: Vysshaya Liga 1992–1996, 2001–2010; Pervaya Liga 1996–1997; Soviet League Class A3 1971–1992; Soviet League Class B 1961–1971
- Founded: 1958
- Home arena: Sports Palace "Yubileyny"
- Colours
- Head coach: Anatoly Chistyakov
- Affiliate: Metallurg Magnitogorsk (KHL)
- Website: orsk-hockey.ru

Yuzhny Ural Orsk is an ice hockey team in Orsk, Russia. They play in the VHL, the second level of ice hockey in Russia.

== History ==
The original club (then Yuzhuralmash) was founded in 1958. It ceased to exist by the end of the 1990s but was revived several years later. In 2008 they became affiliated with Metallurg Magnitogorsk of the Kontinental Hockey League.
