= HC Ryazan =

- City: Ryazan, Russia
- League: VHL 2010-present: Vysshaya Liga 2007-2010; Pervaya Liga 2006-2007; Vtoraya Liga 1999-2006
- Conference: Western
- Founded: 1999
- Home arena: Sports Palace "Olimpiyskiy" (2,700 seats)
- Colours
- Head coach: Dmitry Parkhomenko
- Affiliates: Sibir Novosibirsk (KHL); Molniya Ryazan (MHL-B)
- Website: http://www.хкрязань.рф

HC Ryazan is an ice hockey team in Ryazan, Russia. They play in the VHL, the second level of ice hockey in Russia. The club is affiliated with a KHL team Sibir Novosibirsk since 2012.

== History ==
The team was founded in 1997 as Vyatich Ryazan. It inheriting its name from an older ice hockey team that represented the city of Ryazan in minor Soviet and Russian hockey championships. It was renamed as the Hockey Club Ryazan in 1999.
