= Neftyanik Almetyevsk =

Russian ice hockey team

- City: Almetyevsk, Tatarstan, Russia
- League: VHL 2010-Present: Vysshaya Liga 1992-2010; Soviet League Class A3 1979-1992; Soviet League Class B 1966-1979
- Founded: 1965
- Home arena: Yubileiny Sports Palace
- Colours
- Head coach: (Russia) Ilnur Gizatullin
- Affiliates: Ak Bars Kazan (KHL); Sputnik Almetyevsk (MHL)

Neftyanik Almetyevsk is an ice hockey team in Almetyevsk, Russia. They play in the All-Russian Hockey League (VHL), which is the second level of Russian ice hockey. In 2024, they have won the VHL playoffs and were awarded the Petrov Cup.

== History ==
The club was founded in 1965 as Sputnik. In 1986, they were renamed Neftyanik, Russian for oiler. In 2008, Neftyanik joined the Vysshaya Liga (VHL), and affiliated with Ak Bars Kazan of the KHL.

== Achievements ==
- Pervaya Liga champion: 1979
- Vysshaya Liga champion: 1994, 2000
- Petrov Cup (All-Russian Hockey League champion): 2024
