= Yermak Angarsk =

- City: Angarsk, Irkutsk Oblast, Russia
- League: VHL 2010-present: Vysshaya Liga 1992-1996, 2007-2010; Pervaya Liga 1996-1997, 2005-2007; Soviet League Class A3 1966-1971, 1978-1992; Soviet League Class B 1961-1964, 1972-1978; Soviet League Class A2 1964-1966
- Founded: 1959
- Home arena: Yermak Arena
- Colours
- Affiliate: Angarsky Yermak (MHL-B)
- Website: хкермак.рф

Yermak Angarsk is an ice hockey team in Angarsk, Russia. They play in the VHL, the second level of Russian ice hockey. The club was formerly affiliated with Metallurg Novokuznetsk of the KHL.

== History ==
The club was founded as Trud Angarsk in 1959. They changed their name to Yermak Angarsk in 1964.

By the end of the 90s the club had serious financial hardships and de facto ceased to exist and was revived only in 2005.
