= Rubin Tyumen =

- City: Tyumen, Russia
- League: VHL 2010–present: Vysshaya Liga 1992–1994, 1999–2010; RSL 1996–1999; IHL 1994–1996; Soviet League Class A3 1972–1979, 1983–1992
- Founded: 1972
- Home arena: Sports Palace Tyumen (3,300 seats)
- Colours
- Head coach: Miskhat Fakhrutdinov
- Affiliate: Tyumen Legion (MHL)
- Website: http://www.hcrubin.ru/

Rubin Tyumen is a professional ice hockey team in Tyumen, Russia. They play in the VHL, the second level of Russian ice hockey.

== History ==
The club's direct predecessor was a team called Vodnik Tyumen. It participated in lower levels of the Soviet hockey championship representing a Tyumen shipbuilding plant. In 1972, its place was taken by a team called Rubin ("Ruby") that began to represent a Tyumen automobile plant. It participated in the second group of the USSR championship "A". In 1995, it was reestablished as Gazovik Tyumen and changed its name back to Rubin Tyumen in 2010. In 2011, Rubin became the first VHL champions.

== Achievements ==
- VHL Bratina Cup: 2011

(bronze) IHL Championship (1): 1996
