= List of All-Russian Hockey League arenas =

The following is a list of All-Russian Hockey League (VHL) arenas.

== Current arenas ==
Rank	Arena	Ice hockey capacity only	Opened (* last renovation)	City	Home team(s) (dates)	Image
1	Ice Palace	12,452	2000	(Russia) Saint Petersburg	SKA-VMF (2024–present, some matches)	
2	Arena Metallurg	7,500	2007	(Russia) Magnitogorsk	Magnitka (2025-present, some matches)	
3	Platinum Arena	7,046	2018	(Russia) Krasnoyarsk	Sokol (2018-present)	
4	Kuznetsk Metallurgists Sports Palace	6,818	2023*	(Russia) Novokuznetsk	Metallurg (1984–2020, 2024-present)	
5	Yubileyny Sports Palace	6,381	2016*	(Russia) Saint Petersburg	HC Dynamo (2016-present, some matches)	
6	Universal Sports Palace Molot	6,000	1989*	(Russia) Perm	Molot (1989-present)	
7	Yugra Arena	5,500	2006	(Russia) Khanty-Mansiysk	Yugra (2006-present)	
8	Dizel Arena	5,500	2011	(Russia) Penza	Dizel (2011-present)	
9	Blinov SCC	5,200	2026*	(Russia) Omsk	Omsk Wings (2026-present)	
10	Kristall Ice Sports Palace	5,141	2014*	(Russia) Saratov	Kristall (1969-present)	
11	Vysotsky Sports Palace	5,000	2021*	(Russia) Samara	CSK VVS (1950–2017, 2021-present)	
12	Sports Palace Yubileyny	4,500	2008*	(Russia) Orsk	Yuzhny Ural (1985-present)	
13	Titov-Arena	4,281	2019*	(Russia) Barnaul	Dynamo-Altay (2006-present)	
14	Yunost Sport Palace	3,560	1967	(Russia) Chelyabinsk	Chelmet (2012-present)	
15	CSKA Arena (Small)	3,500	2015	(Russia) Moscow	HC Zvezda (2018–present)	
16	Sport Palace	3,345	1998*	(Russia) Kazan	Bars (2009-present)	
17	Ice Sport Palace Khimik	3,229	1966	(Russia) Voskresensk	Khimik (1966-present)	
18	Ice Palace	3,072	2021	(Russia) Tula	AKM (2021-present)	
19	Yubileyny Sports Palace	3,050	1986	(Russia) Voronezh	Buran (1986-present)	
20	Central Sports Palace (Kaluga)	3,038	2021	(Russia) Kaluga	HC Kaluga (2021-present)	
21	Sports Palace Olimpiyskiy	2,825	2005	(Russia) Ryazan	HC Ryazan (2005-present)	
22	Ice Sports Palace named after N.V. Paryshev	2,500	2001	(Russia) Kurgan	Zauralie (2001-present)	
23	Yubileiny Sports Palace	2,200	1982	(Russia) Almetyevsk	Neftyanik (1982-present)	
24	Sports Palace Arktika	2,184	1970	(Russia) Norilsk	HC Norilsk (2023-present)	
25	Neftekamsk Ice Palace	2,000	2007	(Russia) Neftekamsk	Toros (2007-present)	
26	Ice Sports Palace	1,800	2011	(Russia) Surgut	Yugra (2023-present, some matches)	
27	Olimp arena	1,793	2010	(Russia) Kirovo-Chepetsk	Olimpiya (2010-present)	
28	Yubileyny Sports Palace (Small)	1,500	2016*	(Russia) Saint Petersburg	HC Dynamo (2016-present)	
29	Hockey city	1,418	2016	(Russia) Saint Petersburg	SKA-VMF (2016–present)	
30	Crystal Ice Palace	1,250	2015*	(Russia) Tambov	HC Tambov (1981-present)	
31	Hockey Academy Avangard	1,200	2019	(Russia) Omsk	Omsk Wings (2021-present)	
32	Ice Arena named after A. Kozitsyn	1,100	2012	(Russia) Verkhnyaya Pyshma	Gornyak-UGMK (2017-present)	
33	Indoor skating rink Olimpiets	504	2012	(Russia) Izhevsk	HC Izhstal	
34	DYUSSH Metallurg	250	?	(Russia) Magnitogorsk	Magnitka (2024-present)	
35	Partikum Ice Palace	249	2009	(Russia) Tyumen	Rubin (2023-present)	

== Future/proposed arenas ==
Rank	Arena	Ice hockey capacity only	Оpening as planned (*renovation)	City	Home team(s)	Image
1	Izhstal Sport Palace	3,141	2026*	(Russia) Izhevsk	HC Izhstal	
2	Perm Arena	10,000	2027	(Russia) Perm	Molot	
3	Sports Palace	3,350	2026*	(Russia) Tyumen	Rubin	
4	Ice Palace	2,500	2026?	(Russia) Norilsk	HC Norilsk	
5	Sports complex Khimik	5,500	2028	(Russia) Voskresensk	Khimik	
6	Metallurg Hockey Academy	1,200	2027	(Russia) Magnitogorsk	Magnitka	

== Former arenas ==
Rank	Arena	Ice hockey capacity only	Оpening as planned (*renovation)	City	Home team(s) (dates)	Image
1	Humo Arena	12,500	2019	(Uzbekistan) Tashkent	Humo (2019–2020)	
2	Arena 2000	9,070	2001	(Russia) Yaroslavl	Lokomotiv VHL (2011–2013)	
3	Ermak Ice Palace	6,900	2010	(Russia) Angarsk	HC Yermak (2011–2023)	
4	Lada Arena	6,034	2013	(Russia) Togliatti	HC Lada (2013–2014, 2018–2023 )	
5	Karagandy-Arena	5,500	2001	(Kazakhstan) Karaganda	Saryarka (2012–2020)	
6	Trade Union Sport Palace	5,500	2007*	(Russia) Nizhny Novgorod	Torpedo-Gorky (2019-2026)	
7	Konovalenko Sports Palace	4,200	1990	(Russia) Nizhny Novgorod	Torpedo-Gorky (2019-2026)	
8	Harbin Ice Hockey Arena	5,304	1996	(China) Harbin	Heilongjiang Kūnlún Hóngxīng (2017–2018)	
9	Boris Alexandrov Sports Palace	4,400	2001*	(Kazakhstan) Ust-Kamenogorsk	Torpedo Ust-Kamenogorsk (2012–2020)	
10	Kazakhstan Sports Palace	4,070	2001	(Kazakhstan) Astana	Nomad (2019–2020)	
11	Sport Palace	3,500	2025*	(Russia) Rostov-on-Don	HC Rostov (2013–2017, 2025-2026)	
12	Ice Arena	458	2014	(Russia) Rostov-on-Don	HC Rostov (2017–2025)	
13	Volgar Sports Palace	2,900	1975	(Russia) Togliatti	HC Lada (2010–2013)	
14	Ice Palace	2,831	2012	(Russia) Krasnodar	HC Kuban (2012–2015)	
15	Chelny Sports Palace	1,500	2005	(Russia) Naberezhnye Chelny	HC Chelny (2005-2026)	
16	Dynamo Sports Academy	336	2023	(Russia) Moscow	Unison (2024-2025)	

== See also ==
- List of KHL arenas
- List of indoor arenas in Russia
