= Avangard =

Avangard may refer to:

== Sports ==
- Avangard Budy, a bandy club from Ukraine
- Avangard Stadium (disambiguation), multiple locations
- FC Avangard, Kazakhstan football team
- FC Avangard Kamyshin, Russia
- FC Avangard Kursk, a football team in Kursk, Russia
- Avangard Omsk, an ice hockey team in Omsk, Russia
- FC Avangard Podolsk, a former association football club from Podolsk, Russia
- Avangard-Yugra Kogalym, an ice hockey team from Kogalym, Russia

=== Soviet Union ===
- Avangard (sports society) was an all-Union sports society in the Soviet Union and it gave the name to many teams:
- Avangard Chelyabinsk
- Avangard Kharkov
- Avangard Tambov
- Avangard Komsomolsk-na-Amure
- FC Avangard Krivoi Rog
- FC Avangard Nikolaev
- FC Avangard Petropavlovsk
- Avangard Saratov
- FC Avangard Simferopol
- FC Avangard Sverdlovsk
- FC Avangard Ternopol
- FC Avangard Zhitomir

== Places ==
=== Russia ===
- Avangard, Iglinsky District, Bashkortostan
- Avangard, Ishimbaysky District, Bashkortostan
- Avangard, Ryazan Oblast
- Avangard, Samara Oblast

=== Elsewhere ===
- Avangard, Tajikistan, a city

== People ==
- Avangard Leontiev (born 1947), Soviet and Russian theater and film actor, teacher, professor
- Avangard Fyodorov, Soviet and Russian clarinetist and music educator

== Other uses ==
- Avangard (hypersonic glide vehicle), a Russian weapon system
  - RS-26 Rubezh (R&D codename: Avangard), a Russian ICBM
- Avangard (Saint Petersburg company), a Russian company
- Moscow Machine Building Plant "Avangard", a Moscow-based weapons manufacturer
