= Pavel Sedov =

Russian ice hockey player

- Born: January 12, 1982 (age 44) Voskresensk, USSR
- Height: 6 ft 3 in (191 cm)
- Weight: 192 lb (87 kg; 13 st 10 lb)
- Position: Forward
- Shot: Left
- Played for: RSL; Khimik Moscow Oblast
- NHL draft: 161st overall, 2000; Tampa Bay Lightning
- Playing career: 1999–2015

Pavel Sedov (born January 12, 1982) is a Russian former professional ice hockey forward. He was selected by Tampa Bay Lightning in the 5th round (161st overall) of the 2000 NHL entry draft. Sedov has played in the Russian Superleague with Khimik Moscow Oblast during the 2003-04 season.

== Career statistics ==
			Regular season					Playoffs
Season	Team	League	GP	G	A	Pts	PIM	GP	G	A	Pts	PIM
1999–2000	Khimik Voskresensk	RUS.2	10	0	0	0	2	2	0	0	0	0
1999–2000	Khimik–2 Voskresensk	RUS.3	21	5	5	10	26	—	—	—	—	—
2000–01	Khimik Voskresensk	RUS.2	23	2	1	3	10	13	0	0	0	2
2000–01	Khimik–2 Voskresensk	RUS.3	9	4	3	7	2	—	—	—	—	—
2001–02	Khimik Voskresensk	RUS.2	14	1	1	2	0	6	2	0	2	0
2001–02	Khimik–2 Voskresensk	RUS.3	14	5	1	6	0	—	—	—	—	—
2002–03	Khimik Voskresensk	RUS.2	25	1	5	6	6	3	0	0	0	0
2002–03	Khimik–2 Voskresensk	RUS.3	21	6	7	13	6	—	—	—	—	—
2002–03	HC Ryazan	RUS.4	2	0	2	2	2	—	—	—	—	—
2003–04	Khimik Voskresensk	RSL	10	1	0	1	2	—	—	—	—	—
2003–04	Khimik–2 Voskresensk	RUS.3	15	3	5	8	8	—	—	—	—	—
2003–04	THK Tver	RUS.2	26	2	6	8	6	—	—	—	—	—
2004–05	HK MVD–THK Tver	RUS.3	28	9	4	13	6	—	—	—	—	—
2004–05	HC Dmitrov	RUS.3	9	0	2	2	0	—	—	—	—	—
2004–05	HC Ryazan	RUS.4	11	7	6	13	0	—	—	—	—	—
2005–06	Khimik–2 Voskresensk	RUS.3	39	6	9	15	22	—	—	—	—	—
2006–07	HC Ryazan	RUS.3	70	24	29	53	14	—	—	—	—	—
2007–08	HC Ryazan	RUS.2	50	6	10	16	14	—	—	—	—	—
2008–09	HC Ryazan	RUS.2	63	13	13	26	18	8	3	4	7	2
2009–10	HC Ryazan	RUS.2	44	14	8	22	14	8	0	1	1	4
2010–11	HC Ryazan	VHL	52	11	7	18	14	3	0	0	0	0
2011–12	HC Ryazan	VHL	53	4	8	12	59	—	—	—	—	—
2012–13	Slavutych Smolensk	RUS.3	47	17	12	29	28	—	—	—	—	—
2013–14	Slavutych Smolensk	RUS.3	44	16	13	29	12	8	1	1	2	2
2014–15	HC Tambov	RUS.3	26	2	0	2	6	—	—	—	—	—
RUS.2 & VHL totals			360	54	59	113	143	43	5	5	10	8
RUS.3 totals			343	97	90	187	130	8	1	1	2	2
RSL totals			10	1	0	1	2	—	—	—	—	—
