= Evgeni Galkin =

Russian ice hockey player (born 1975)

- Born: November 27, 1975 (age 50) Chelyabinsk, Soviet Union
- Height: 6 ft 0 in (183 cm)
- Weight: 187 lb (85 kg; 13 st 5 lb)
- Position: Right wing
- Shot: Left
- Played for: Yuzhny Ural Orsk; Metallurg Magnitogorsk; Traktor Chelyabinsk; Yunior Kurgan; Mechel Chelyabinsk; Molot-Prikamye Perm; Slavutych Smolensk
- Playing career: 1992–2013

Evgeni Vladimirovich Galkin (Russian: Евгений Владимирович Галкин; born 27 November 1975, in Chelyabinsk, Soviet Union) is a Russian professional ice hockey winger who played for Traktor Chelyabinsk of the Kontinental Hockey League (KHL).

== Career statistics ==
| | | | Regular season | | | | | Playoffs |
| Season | Team | League | GP | G | A | Pts | PIM | GP | G | A | Pts | PIM |
|---|---|---|---|---|---|---|---|---|---|---|---|---|
| 1992–93 | Yuzhny Ural Orsk | Russia2 | 8 | 1 | 1 | 2 | 0 | — | — | — | — | — |
| 1993–94 | Yuzhny Ural Orsk | Russia2 | 3 | 0 | 0 | 0 | 8 | — | — | — | — | — |
| 1993–94 | Metallurg Magnitogorsk-2 | Russia3 | 41 | 22 | 8 | 30 | 52 | — | — | — | — | — |
| 1994–95 | Metallurg Magnitogorsk-2 | Russia2 | 51 | 17 | 7 | 24 | 93 | — | — | — | — | — |
| 1995–96 | Metallurg Magnitogorsk-2 | Russia2 | 44 | 16 | 10 | 26 | 36 | — | — | — | — | — |
| 1996–97 | Metallurg Magnitogorsk | Russia | 26 | 2 | 4 | 6 | 8 | 9 | 0 | 0 | 0 | 2 |
| 1996–97 | Metallurg Magnitogorsk-2 | Russia3 | 5 | 4 | 4 | 8 | 4 | — | — | — | — | — |
| 1997–98 | Metallurg Magnitogorsk-2 | Russia3 | 4 | 2 | 0 | 2 | 6 | — | — | — | — | — |
| 1997–98 | Traktor Chelyabinsk | Russia | 30 | 5 | 2 | 7 | 38 | — | — | — | — | — |
| 1997–98 | Traktor Chelyabinsk | WPHL | 8 | 5 | 2 | 7 | 38 | — | — | — | — | — |
| 1997–98 | Yunior Kurgan | Russia3 | 2 | 1 | 0 | 1 | 0 | — | — | — | — | — |
| 1998–99 | Traktor Chelyabinsk | Russia | 40 | 5 | 5 | 10 | 42 | — | — | — | — | — |
| 1998–99 | Traktor Chelyabinsk | WPHL | 8 | 3 | 1 | 4 | 0 | — | — | — | — | — |
| 1999–00 | Traktor Chelyabinsk | Russia2 | 33 | 14 | 10 | 24 | 58 | 11 | 3 | 1 | 4 | 14 |
| 2000–01 | Mechel Chelyabinsk | Russia | 44 | 10 | 10 | 20 | 44 | 2 | 0 | 0 | 0 | 34 |
| 2001–02 | Mechel Chelyabinsk | Russia | 43 | 9 | 9 | 18 | 64 | — | — | — | — | — |
| 2002–03 | Mechel Chelyabinsk | Russia | 50 | 7 | 12 | 19 | 122 | — | — | — | — | — |
| 2003–04 | Molot-Prikamye Perm | Russia2 | 44 | 21 | 15 | 36 | 90 | 10 | 2 | 3 | 5 | 6 |
| 2003–04 | Molot-Prikamye Perm-2 | Russia3 | 2 | 2 | 0 | 2 | 22 | — | — | — | — | — |
| 2004–05 | Traktor Chelyabinsk | Russia2 | 39 | 9 | 20 | 29 | 54 | 7 | 2 | 2 | 4 | 2 |
| 2005–06 | Mechel Chelyabinsk | Russia2 | 44 | 22 | 22 | 44 | 118 | — | — | — | — | — |
| 2005–06 | Traktor Chelyabinsk | Russia2 | 7 | 4 | 2 | 6 | 6 | 13 | 8 | 5 | 13 | 18 |
| 2006–07 | Traktor Chelyabinsk | Russia | 52 | 11 | 14 | 25 | 109 | — | — | — | — | — |
| 2007–08 | Traktor Chelyabinsk | Russia | 55 | 21 | 16 | 37 | 97 | 3 | 0 | 0 | 0 | 8 |
| 2008–09 | Traktor Chelyabinsk | KHL | 56 | 15 | 20 | 35 | 89 | 3 | 0 | 0 | 0 | 2 |
| 2009–10 | Traktor Chelyabinsk | KHL | 46 | 6 | 8 | 14 | 30 | 3 | 0 | 2 | 2 | 0 |
| 2010–11 | Traktor Chelyabinsk | KHL | 37 | 1 | 5 | 6 | 36 | — | — | — | — | — |
| 2012–13 | Slavutych Smolensk | Russia3 | 10 | 3 | 7 | 10 | 6 | — | — | — | — | — |
| KHL totals | | | 139 | 22 | 33 | 55 | 155 | 6 | 0 | 2 | 2 | 2 |
| Russia totals | | | 340 | 70 | 72 | 142 | 524 | 34 | 1 | 2 | 3 | 64 |
| Russia2 totals | | | 273 | 104 | 87 | 191 | 463 | 41 | 15 | 11 | 26 | 40 |
| Russia3 totals | | | 64 | 34 | 19 | 53 | 90 | — | — | — | — | — |
