= Dmitry Sinitsyn (ice hockey) =

Russian ice hockey player (born 1994)

- Born: June 17, 1994 (age 31) Moscow, Russia
- Height: 6 ft 2 in (188 cm)
- Weight: 195 lb (88 kg; 13 st 13 lb)
- Position: Defence
- Shot: Left
- Played for: Dynamo Moscow; HC Lada Togliatti
- NHL draft: 183rd overall, 2012; Dallas Stars
- Playing career: 2014–2017

Dmitry Sinitsyn (born June 17, 1994) is a Russian professional ice hockey player. He is currently an unrestricted free agent who has played in the Kontinental Hockey League (KHL). Sinitsyn was selected by the Dallas Stars in the seventh round (183rd overall) of the 2012 NHL entry draft.

== Playing career ==
Sinitsyn has formerly played collegiate hockey in North America, with the University of Massachusetts-Lowell and major junior hockey with the Regina Pats of the Western Hockey League (WHL).

Un-signed from the Dallas Stars, Sinitsyn returned to Russia to make his professional debut with HC Dynamo Moscow of the KHL, while also playing a season with HC Lada Togliatti.

In the 2017–18 season, Sinitsyn agreed to a contract with Spartak Moscow, before missing the entirety of the year due to injury.

On May 3, 2018, he originally agreed to a VHL contract with newly demoted Metallurg Novokuznetsk for the 2018–19 season, however did not feature with the club.

== Career statistics ==
			Regular season					Playoffs
Season	Team	League	GP	G	A	Pts	PIM	GP	G	A	Pts	PIM
2010–11	Dallas Stars U16	T1EHL	36	11	20	31	18	—	—	—	—	—
2011–12	MHK Zelenograd	MHL B	7	0	0	0	10	—	—	—	—	—
2012–13	UMass-Lowell	HE	13	2	0	2	4	—	—	—	—	—
2013–14	Regina Pats	WHL	69	10	34	44	63	4	0	0	0	6
2014–15	Dynamo Moscow	KHL	15	0	1	1	8	1	0	0	0	0
2014–15	Dynamo Balashikha	VHL	20	2	7	9	6	—	—	—	—	—
2014–15	HK MVD Balashikha	MHL	2	0	1	1	4	2	1	0	1	0
2015–16	Dynamo Moscow	KHL	11	0	1	1	2	1	0	0	0	0
2015–16	Dynamo Balashikha	VHL	19	3	5	8	37	6	1	2	3	2
2016–17	Lada Togliatti	KHL	42	0	8	8	12	—	—	—	—	—
2016–17	Dizel Penza	VHL	9	0	1	1	4	—	—	—	—	—
KHL totals			68	0	10	10	22	2	0	0	0	0
