= 2014 KHL expansion draft =

Selection of players to stock a new team

General information
- Date(s): 17 June 2014

Overview
- Expansion teams: HC Sochi; HC Lada Togliatti
- Expansion season: 2014–15

The 2014 KHL expansion draft was held on 17 June 2014 in order to fill the roster of the league's expansion teams HC Sochi and HC Lada Togliatti for the 2014-15 season.

== Rules ==
HC Sochi and HC Lada Togliatti were able to select players from any of the Russian-based teams in the KHL, except from Lokomotiv Yaroslavl and HC Spartak Moscow. These exceptions were because Lokomotiv had been still recovering from the 2011 Lokomotiv Yaroslavl plane crash, and Spartak was taking a year off due to financial issues.

Before the draft, each team submitted two players to be available for selection in the expansion draft, which was to consist of five rounds, in each of which the Sochi club was granted the 1st, 2nd, 3rd and 4th picks, with the 5th choice reserved for the Togliatti club. The players submitted for selection might have been either Russian or foreign.

The players submitted to the draft had to meet the following criteria:

- Players born in 1993 or earlier;
- Players on existing contracts with KHL clubs or who have received offers of a trial period or a contract from KHL clubs;
- Players whose contracts do not contain a clause prohibiting an exchange with another club;
- Players whose contractual status is not In Conflict, Secured Rights or Reserved Player.

The regulations also stipulate that Sochi and Togliatti are to pay compensation to the selected player's clubs, the sum not exceeding 30% of their salaries during the 2014-15 season. Selected players are barred from being traded for monetary compensation during the season.

HC Sochi's roster had a limit of seven foreign players (with only one of whom being a goaltender) for the season. The standard rules of five foreign players and one goaltender applied to Togliatti.

== Draft picks ==
HC Sochi made three selections, defensemen Artyom Sedunov from Amur Khabarovsk and Yefim Gurkin of Salavat Yulaev Ufa, and Admiral Vladivostok forward Alexander Shevchenko.

HC Lada Togliatti took only one player, Severstal Cherepovets forward Alexander Gogolev.
