= Gogolev =

Gogolev (Russian: Гоголев), feminine: Gogoleva (Russian: Гоголева) is a surname derived from the word "гоголь". It may refer to:

- Alexander Gogolev (born 1992), Russian ice hockey player
- Dmitri Gogolev (born 1972), Russian ice hockey player
- Elena Gogoleva (1900–1993), Russian actress
- Stephen Gogolev (born 2004), Canadian figure skater
- Vasily Gogolev (born 1957), Russian wrestler
