= National Junior Hockey League =

Ice hockey league in Russia

Russian Hockey League
- Formerly: Junior Hockey League Division B (2011-2016); National Junior Hockey League (2016-2026)
- Sport: Ice hockey
- Founded: 2011
- First season: 2011–12
- Director: Dmitry Yefimov
- Motto: Лига сильных (Liga silnykh, The League of the strong)
- No. of teams: 26
- Country: Russia formerly also: Belarus; Kazakhstan; Latvia; Lithuania; Moldova
- Most recent champion: Metallurg-VO Cherepovets (1st title)
- Most titles: Gornyak Uchaly (2 titles)
- Promotion to: MHL (2 finalists)
- Related competitions: KHL; VHL; MHL; VHL-B
- Website: http://nmhl.fhr.ru/

The Russian Hockey League (formerly Junior Hockey League Division B (MHL-B), National Junior Hockey League (NMHL)) (Russian: Российская хоккейная лига) is the second level of the Junior Hockey League, the KHL's junior ice hockey league. The B division was established in 2011 and the inaugural season was the 2011–12 season.

The Regions Cup is awarded to the champion of the playoffs of the league.

== Generation Cup ==
The logo of Generation Cup

The Generation Cup (Russian: Кубок Поколения, Kubok Pokoleniya) is the all-star game of MHL-B and analog to the MHL's Challenge Cup. The first ever Generation Cup took place on 23 February 2012 in Penza and featured Team East against Team West.

=== Editions ===
Edition	Date	Venue	Team 1	Score	Team 2
2012	23 February	(Russia) Temp sports ice palace, Penza	Team West	3-2	Team East
2013	17 April	(Russia) Olymp Arena, Kirovo-Chepetsk	Team West	6–3	Team East
2014	18 January	(Russia) Ice Arena Gornyak Uchaly, Uchaly	Team West	1–4	Team East
2015	17 January	(Russia) Yubileyny Sports Palace, Almetyevsk	Team East	3–4	Team West
2016	30 January	(Russia) Ice Palace Naberezhny Chelny, Naberezhnye Chelny	Team East	4–0	Team West

== Future Cup ==
The Future Cup (Russian: Кубок Будущего, Kubok Budushchego) was an exhibition game featuring under-18 players of MHL and MHL-B. The first ever (and so far only) Future Cup took place on 13 March 2012 in Chelyabinsk and featured players who were not born before 1 January 1994.

=== Editions ===
Edition	Date	Venue	Team 1	Score	Team 2
2011–12	12 March	(Russia) Traktor Sport Palace, Chelyabinsk	Team West	3–1	Team East

== Super Cup ==
The Super Cup (Russian: Суперкубок, Superkubok) was the trophy awarded to the winner of the game between the winner of the Kharlamov Cup (the MHL champions) and the winner of the Regions Cup (the MHL-B champions). The first ever (and so far only) Super Cup took place on 30 April 2016 in Uchaly.

=== Editions ===
Edition	Date	Venue	Team 1	Score	Team 2
2016	30 April	(Russia) Ice Arena Gornyak Uchaly, Uchaly	Gornyak Uchaly (MHL-B)	1–5	Loko Yaroslavl (MHL)

== 2012 expansion ==
Seven new teams were confirmed for the 2012–13 season: MHC Dmitrov, Zauralie Kurgan, HC Ryazan, Buran Voronezh, HC Belgorod, Sputnik Nizhny Tagil and Platina Chișinău from Moldova.

== Teams in 2026–27 ==
Russian Hockey League
Conf.	Team	City	Arena	KHL/VHL affiliated club
West	Arktika	(Russia) Murmansk	Universal sports and leisure center
West	Akhmat-Granit Grozny	(Russia) Grozny	Ice Arena "Akhmat"
West	HC Bryansk	(Russia) Bryansk	Desna Stadium
West	Vityaz-Podolsk	(Russia) Podolsk	Vityaz Ice Palace
West	Dynamo-576	(Russia) St.Petersburg	Yubileyny Sports Palace	Dynamo St.Petersburg
West	Dynamo-Karelia	(Russia) Kondopoga	Sports Palace "Kondopoga"	Dynamo St.Petersburg
West	Kaluga Rockets	(Russia) Kaluga	Sports Palace "Tsentralny"	HC Kaluga
West	Krasnaya Mashina Akademiya	(Russia) Mytishchi	Mytishchi Arena
West	Leningradets	(Russia) Vyborg	Sports Complex "Vyborg"
West	Metallurg-VO	(Russia) Cherepovets	Ice Palace	Severstal Cherepovets
West	Polyot	(Russia) Rybinsk	Sports Palace "Polyot"
West	Tverichi-SShOR	(Russia) Tver	Sports Complex "Yubileiny"
West	Fakel Yamal	(Russia) Salekhard	Ice Palace
East	HC Belgorod	(Russia) Belgorod	Oranzevy liod
East	Dizelist	(Russia) Penza	Dizel Arena	Dizel Penza
East	Yermak	(Russia) Angarsk	Winter Stadium "Yermak"
East	HC Krasnodar	(Russia) Krasnodar	Ice Palace	HC Sochi
East	Kristall-Yunior	(Russia) Saratov	Ice Sports Palace "Kristall"	Kristall Saratov
East	MHC Ryazan-VDV	(Russia) Ryazan	Sports Palace "Olimpiyskiy"	HC Ryazan-VDV
East	MHC Tambov	(Russia) Tambov	Ice Palace "Temp"	HC Tambov
East	Progress	(Russia) Glazov	Glazov Arena
East	Proton	(Russia) Novovoronezh	Ice Palace "Ostalnaya"	Buran Voronezh
East	HC Rostov	(Russia) Rostov-on-Don	Sports Palace
East	Sokol	(Russia) Novocheboksarsk	Ice Palace "Sokol"
East	HC Samara	(Russia) Samara
East	EcoNiva-Bobrov	(Russia) Bobrov	Vyacheslav Fetisov Ice Palace	Buran Voronezh

== Champions ==
Season	Regions Cup Champion	Regions Cup Finalist	Series; Result	Bronze Medalist	Eastern; Division winner	Central; Division winner	Western; Division winner	Regular season winner
2011–12	(Russia) Oktan Perm	(Russia) Kristall Berdsk	3–1	(Russia) Batyr	(Russia) Kristall Berdsk (30-2-0)	(Russia) Oktan Perm (31-5-0)	(Russia) MHK Zelenograd (25-10-1)	(Russia) Kristall Berdsk
Season	Regions Cup Champion	Regions Cup Finalist	Series; Result	Bronze Medalist	Northwest; Division winner	Volga; Division winner	Ural-Siberia; Division winner	Regular season winner
2012–13	(Russia) Junior Kurgan	(Russia) Batyr	3–1	(Russia) Sputnik	(Latvia) HK Liepājas Metalurgs (32-6-2)	(Russia) Irbis Kazan (33-8-3)	(Russia) Junior Kurgan (36-7-0)	(Russia) Junior Kurgan

Season	Regions Cup; Champion	Regions Cup; Finalist	Series; Result	Bronze; Medalist	Eastern Conference winner	Western Conference winner	Regular season winner
2013–14	(Russia) Berkuty Kubani Krasnodar	(Russia) Loko-Junior Yaroslavl	3–1	(Russia) Mechel Chelyabinsk	(Russia) Mechel Chelyabinsk (32-5-1)	(Russia) Berkuty Kubani Krasnodar (31-5-2)	(Russia) Mechel Chelyabinsk
2014–15	(Russia) Rossosh Voronezh	(Russia) Gornyak Uchaly	3–2	(Russia) Batyr & (Russia) MHK Zelenograd^{[*]}	(Russia) Gornyak Uchaly (44-6-2)	(Russia) Rossosh Voronezh (51-9-4)	(Russia) Rossosh Voronezh
2015–16	(Russia) Gornyak Uchaly	(Russia) Rossosh Voronezh	3–0	(Russia) Loko-Junior Yaroslavl	(Russia) Gornyak Uchaly (28-10-2)	(Russia) Rossosh Voronezh (34-6-4)	(Russia) Rossosh Voronezh
2016–17	(Russia) Gornyak Uchaly	(Russia) Dizelist Penza	3–2	(Russia) Loko-Junior Yaroslavl	(Russia) Gornyak Uchaly (37-4-1-6)	(Russia) Dizelist Penza (34-3-2-5)	(Russia) Gornyak Uchaly
2017–18	(Russia) Dizelist Penza	(Russia) Batyr	3–0	(Russia) Loko-Junior Yaroslavl	(Russia) Progress Glazov (20-4-1-7)	(Russia) Dizelist Penza (21-5-3-7)	(Russia) Dizelist Penza
2018–19	(Russia) Dizelist Penza	(Russia) Batyr	3–0	(Russia) Loko-Junior Yaroslavl	(Russia) Progress Glazov (20-4-1-7)	(Russia) Dizelist Penza (21-5-3-7)	(Russia) Dizelist Penza
2019–20	Playoff matches were not played due to COVID-19 pandemic						(Russia) Dynamo-Junior St.Petersburg
2020–21	(Russia) Loko-Junior Yaroslavl	(Russia) Dynamo-Junior St.Petersburg	3–1
2021–22	(Russia) Poliot Rybinsk	(Russia) Ryazan-VDV (Ryazan)	3–1
2022–23	(Russia) MHC Tambov	(Russia) Poliot Rybinsk	3–1
2023–24	(Russia) Yunison-Moscow	(Russia) MHC Tambov	3–1
2024–25	(Russia) MHC Tambov	(Russia) Kristall Saratov	3–1
2025–26	(Russia) Metallurg-VO Cherepovets	(Russia) Granit-Chekhov	3-0	(Russia) Ryazan-VDV (Russia) Yermak Angarsk	(Russia) Ryazan-VDV (40-5-2-1)	(Russia) Buran Moscow (41-1-3-3)	(Russia) Ryazan-VDV

^{[*]}: Both losing semifinalists received bronze medals
