= MHL Championship =

MHL Championship may refer to:

- Chempionat Molodëzhnoy khokkeynoy ligi (Russian: Чемпионат Молодёжной хоккейной лиги)
- Pervenstvo Molodëzhnoy khokkeynoy ligi (Russian: Первенство Молодёжной хоккейной лиги)
