= Konstantin Volkov (ice hockey, born 1997) =

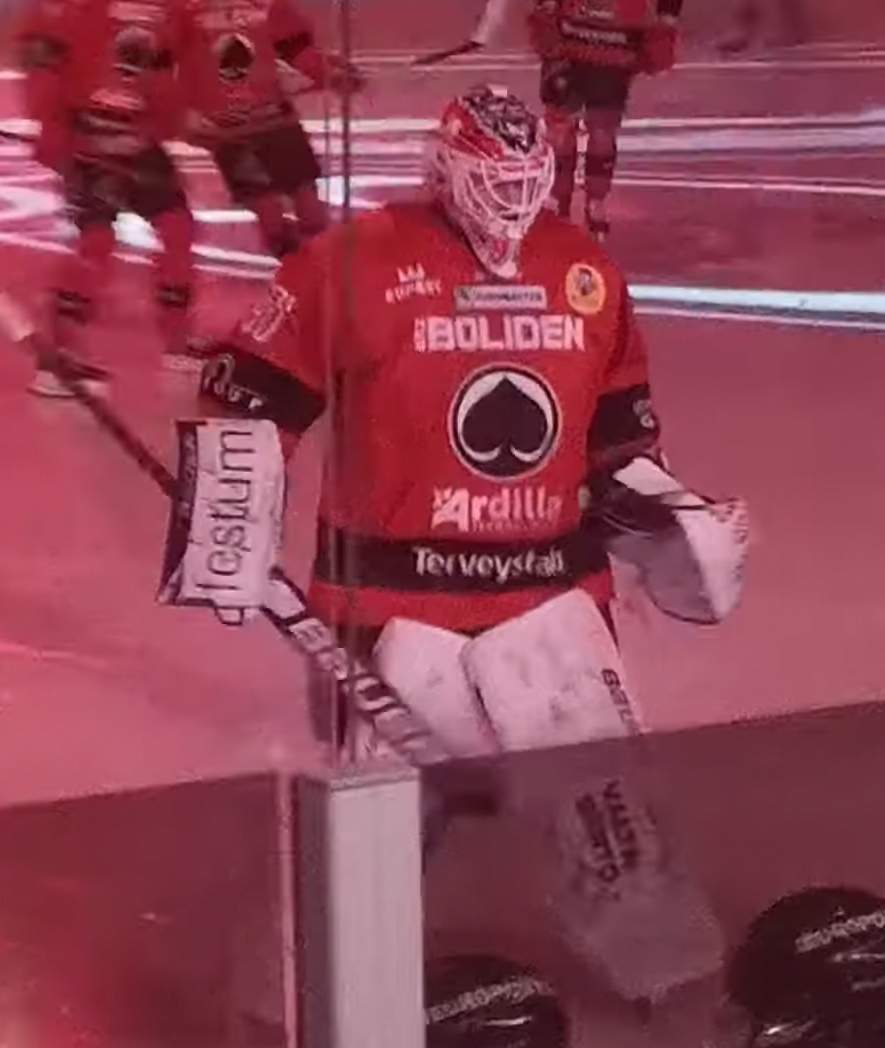
- Born: September 20, 1997 (age 28) Murmansk, Russia
- Height: 6 ft 4 in (193 cm)
- Weight: 212 lb (96 kg; 15 st 2 lb)
- Position: Goaltender
- Caught: Left
- Played for: SKA St. Petersburg; Sokol Krasnoyarsk; HC Yugra; Ässät; Dynamo Moscow; Kunlun Red Star; Lada Togliatti; Sibir Novosibirsk; Dynamo-Altay
- NHL draft: 168th overall, 2016; Nashville Predators
- Playing career: 2016–2025

Konstantin Leonidovich Volkov (rus. Константин Леонидович Волков) is a Russian former professional ice hockey goaltender. He most recently played for Dynamo-Altay Barnaul in the Supreme Hockey League (VHL). He was selected by the Nashville Predators in the sixth round, 168th overall, of the 2016 NHL entry draft.

== Playing career ==
In the 2014–2015 season, Volkov played three games for SKA-1946 in the MHL with a saving percentage of .882%. He moved to SKA-Varyagi in the MHL B in the middle of the season, where he played 28 matches with a save percentage of .906. He also represented Varyagi in the playoffs with a save percentage of .928. In the 2015-2016 season, Volkov followed the same pattern as before: he initially represented SKA-1946 in 17 matches with a save percentage of .902%, until he moved again to Varyagi, where he played six games with a save percentage of .925 percent.

Volkov continued to represent SKA-1946 in the 2016–2017 season. He played 36 games in the regular season with a save percentage of .934%. He won the goalie of the year award was drafted by the Nashville Predators. In the following season, Volkov was able to represent the KHL club SKA St. Petersburg, but did not play any games, in addition to which he played in the previously familiar SKA-1946 and SKA-Varyagi as well as SKA-Neva. The average save percentage for the whole season was .823. Volkov got to play the playoffs in SKA-1946 with a save percentage of .935.

Volkov played in Russia's second highest league level in VHL from 2018 to 2021. In the season 2018–2019, he represented both Sokol Krasnoyarsk and Yugra Khanty-Mansiysk. He played the next two seasons at Jugra and won the series championship in 2021.

In the spring of 2021, Volkov signed a one-year contract with Finnish Liiga club Porin Ässät. He played 37 games that season with a save percentage of .897. Ässät finished 15th (last place) in the 2021–22 season, and he collected 7 wins through 37 regular season games.

In 2022, Volkov signed a two-year contract with HC Dynamo Moscow of the KHL.

Having concluded his contract with Dynamo, Volkov continued in the KHL by joining Chinese-based Kunlun Red Star, on a one-year agreement on 25 June 2024.

At 28 years old, Konstantin Volkov opted to end his playing career after a brief stint with Dynamo-Altay Barnaul of the Supreme Hockey League on assignment from Sibir Novosibirsk.

== Career statistics ==
			Regular season									Playoffs
Season	Team	League	GP	W	L	OT	MIN	GA	SO	GAA	SV%	GP	W	L	MIN	GA	SO	GAA	SV%
2021–22	Ässät	Liiga	37	7	25	4	2045	98	0	2.87	.897	—	—	—	—	—	—	—	—
2022–23	Dynamo Moscow	KHL	31	11	11	6	1626	49	5	1.81	.928	2	0	2	114	4	0	2.11	.923
2023–24	Dynamo Moscow	KHL	10	5	2	0	416	25	1	3.60	.889	—	—	—	—	—	—	—	—
2024–25	Kunlun Red Star	KHL	7	0	5	0	273	22	0	4.84	.832	—	—	—	—	—	—	—	—
2024–25	Lada Togliatti	KHL	5	0	2	1	228	14	0	3.68	.884	—	—	—	—	—	—	—	—
Liiga totals			37	7	25	4	2,045	98	0	2.87	.897	—	—	—	—	—	—	—	—
KHL totals			53	16	22	7	2,657	114	6	2.60	.905	2	0	2	114	4	0	2.11	.923
