= 2016–17 Nashville Predators season =

Professional ice hockey team season

2016–17 Nashville Predators
- Western Conference champions
- Division: 4th Central
- Conference: 8th Western
- 2016–17 record: 41–29–12
- Home record: 24–9–8
- Road record: 17–20–4
- Goals for: 240
- Goals against: 224

Team information
- General manager: David Poile
- Coach: Peter Laviolette
- Captain: Mike Fisher
- Alternate captains: Ryan Ellis; Roman Josi; James Neal
- Arena: Bridgestone Arena
- Minor league affiliates: Milwaukee Admirals (AHL); Cincinnati Cyclones (ECHL)

Team leaders
- Goals: Filip Forsberg and Viktor Arvidsson (31)
- Assists: Ryan Johansen (47)
- Points: Ryan Johansen and Viktor Arvidsson (61)
- Penalty minutes: Austin Watson (99)
- Plus/minus: Ryan Ellis (+17)
- Wins: Pekka Rinne (31)
- Goals against average: Juuse Saros (2.35)

The 2016–17 Nashville Predators season was the 19th season for the National Hockey League (NHL) franchise that was established on June 25, 1997. The Predators advanced to their first ever Conference Final with a 4–2 series win over the St. Louis Blues in the Semifinals, and then advanced to their first-ever Stanley Cup Final after defeating the Anaheim Ducks in six games. They became the third team to make the Stanley Cup Final from the eighth seed since the Edmonton Oilers in 2006 and the Los Angeles Kings in 2012.

It was also the first time a Tennessee-based team in an American professional sports league had made a championship round since the NFL's Tennessee Titans in 1999.

== Season summary ==
=== Regular season ===
==== October ====
The Predators opened their season on October 14 with three power play goals in a 3–2 victory over the Blackhawks. Newly acquired defenseman P. K. Subban scored the first goal for the Predators in his debut for the team. The next night on the road, the Predators fell in a three-goal hole after ten minutes into the first period and scored three to pull within one in the third period, but a hat-trick goal by Richard Panik with 91 seconds remaining secured a 5–3 victory for the Blackhawks.

Back home in Nashville on October 18, the Predators tied the game in the second period with a power play goal from captain Mike Fisher. But it was not enough to overcome goals from Adam Cracknell and Jason Spezza, and the Predators fell 2–1 to the Stars. On October 21, the Predators traveled to Detroit, and Subban, Mike Ribeiro and Fisher scored to extend the Predators NHL-leading eight power play goals to that date. However, with 22 seconds remaining, Darren Helm scored an empty net goal to secure a 5–3 victory for the Red Wings and hand the Predators their third straight loss. They returned home the next day to beat the Pittsburgh Penguins despite multiple cases of food poisoning, involving starting goaltender Pekka Rinne, Ryan Johansen, backup goaltender Marek Mazanec, and Mike Fisher; Juuse Saros made his first start of the season.

In the first of a five-game road trip on October 26, the Predators – suffering a second period collapse of surrendering five goals, including two short-handed goals for only the fourth time in franchise history – fell 6–1 to the Ducks. The next night at the Staples Center, the Predators scored on a short-handed goal by Viktor Arvidsson one minute into the third period to jump to a 2–1 lead. However, Tyler Toffoli of the Kings responded 41 seconds later to tie the game and send it into overtime, where Jeff Carter shot past Rinne with 29 seconds remaining in overtime, defeating the Predators 3–2. The Predators capped their month of play on October 29 with a 4–1 loss to the Sharks.

==== November ====
Starting off the month of November, the Predators killed all four of the Colorado Avalanche's power play opportunities and scored five goals, two from Craig Smith, to defeat the Avalanche 5–1 and end a three-game losing skid. The Predators ended their five-game road trip in Glendale with a 3–2 shootout loss to the Arizona Coyotes. Back home in Nashville on November 5, the Predators and the Hurricanes played through an even matchup, with goals from James Neal and Matt Irwin, that went to a shootout where Jaccob Slavin scored the winning goal past Rinne, and the Hurricanes defeated the Predators 3–2.

In their next game on November 8, the Predators returned to winning form putting up three goals by Ryan Ellis, Neal and Subban in a 3–1 victory over the Senators. Against division rival St. Louis, the Predators scored three goals in the span of six and a half minutes between the second and third period – two by Calle Jarnkrok and one by Neal – to defeat the Blues 3–1. In the final game of the four-game home-stand on November 12, the Predators put on a shutout with goals from Ellis, Neal, Filip Forsberg and Roman Josi, and 27 saves by Rinne in a 5–0 victory over the Anaheim Ducks.

On the road for the first of several swings through Canada this season on November 15, against the Toronto Maple Leafs, Arvidsson and Neal put two goals on the board for the Predators, but Marek Mazanec – starting in place of Rinne, who sat out with a lower back injury – allowed 6 goals on 32 shots (including a hat-trick by James van Riemsdyk) and the Predators lost 6–2. Two nights later in Ottawa against the Senators, the Predators rebounded from their first regulation loss of the month with a 5–1 victory. Neal scored in his sixth straight game during the contest, setting a career-high and tying the franchise record for longest goal streak. Concluding their road swing in St. Louis against the Blues, the Predators scored one goal from Ribeiro in a 3–1 loss.

Back in Nashville on November 21, the Predators made easy work of the Tampa Bay Lightning with a goal from Arvidsson and two goals from Subban in a 3–1 victory. Playing the Dallas Stars two nights later, the Predators – led by goals from Fisher, Forsberg, Ryan Johansen, Neal and Smith – held the Stars to two goals in a 5–2 victory. On November 25 against the Winnipeg Jets, the Jets scored early with a first period goal from Dustin Byfuglien, but the Predators responded with five unanswered goals – three in the second period alone – with two each from Johansen and Colin Wilson, and one from Neal, in a 5–1 victory. In a rematch in Winnipeg two days later, the Predators were shut out for the first time of the season in a 3–0 loss.

The Predators ended the month in Denver with goals from Arvidsson (whose second period goal seven seconds in tied the franchise record for fastest opening goal in a regulation period), Kevin Fiala, Fisher, Johansen and Austin Watson in a 5–3 victory over the Colorado Avalanche.

==== December ====
Playing the New Jersey Devils in Nashville on December 3, the Predators, thanks to goals from Fiala (with two), Josi and Subban, carried a 4–1 lead into the third period. But the Devils responded in the third period with three goals from Michael Cammalleri, Andy Greene and Adam Henrique to tie the score and send the game into overtime. Cammalleri scored with 18 seconds remaining in overtime to hand the Predators a 5–4 loss. The next evening against the Philadelphia Flyers, the Predators, who had been 27 for 28 in power play kills at home, gave up two power play goals to Wayne Simmonds in a 4–2 loss.

Playing Colorado on December 6, the Predators capitalized on mistakes by the Avalanche's defensemen with goals by Arvidsson, Neal and Subban, and Josi scored the winning goal one minute and four seconds into the third period on a five-on-three power play to defeat the Avalanche 4–3. In the next game, away at Dallas on December 8, Arvidsson scored a shorthanded goal in the first, and Jarnkrok scored in the third period, but the Predators could not overcome Rinne giving up four goals on 18 shots in the first period and fell 5–2. On the road against Arizona on December 10, the Predators scored one goal, by Josi, in a 4–1 loss.

Back home in Nashville on December 13, the Predators fell into a three-goal hole by the start of the second period against St. Louis thanks to Brad Hunt, Ryan Reaves and Kevin Shattenkirk. The Predators – with goals by Fisher (who scored two goals), Forsberg, Johansen, Neal and Ribeiro – rallied with six unanswered goals to defeat the Blues 6–3 on December 13. Two nights later against the Minnesota Wild, Nashville, with goals from Ellis and Fisher, held the Wild to a one-goal lead through the third period. However, as the Wild's offense sputtered through the final two periods, former Predators goaltender Devan Dubnyk picked up the slack with 34 saves and the Wild, thanks to two empty net goals, beat the Predators 5–2. Capping the week on December 17 against the New York Rangers, the Predators tied the score with a second period goal by team captain Fisher, but their miserable run in overtime continued as former Predator Jimmy Vesey scored the first goal in the shootout, and the Rangers won 2–1.

On the road against Philadelphia on December 19, Forsberg tied the game in the third period to send it into overtime, and Ellis scored the lone shootout goal to win a game in overtime for the first time of the season (they were 0–5 in overtime coming into the game) in a 2–1 victory over the Flyers. The next night away at New Jersey, the Predators matched their highest offensive score of the season with goals from Mattias Ekholm, Forsberg, Johansen – who scored a short-handed goal – and Neal, who scored two, in a 5–1 victory against the Devils. Back home in Nashville on December 22 to play the Los Angeles Kings, the Predators ended the week in a 4–0 shutout loss.

Back in action at home on December 27 against the Wild following Christmas break, Reid Boucher and Forsberg scored for the Predators in the second period and tied the game, but Jared Spurgeon of Minnesota scored the winning goal in overtime to hand the Wild a 3–2 victory. Two nights later against the Chicago Blackhawks, the Predators, who scored the first period with a goal by Forsberg, broke a 1–1 tie in the third period with a Fisher power play goal. But a penalty call on Smith for tripping put the Blackhawks in the power play, and Jonathan Toews tied the at two midway through the period. Patrick Kane scored the go-ahead goal with five minutes remaining and the Blackhawks defeated the Predators 3–2. The next night in St. Louis, the Predators closed out the month of December with goals by Arvidsson, Forsberg, Yannick Weber and Wilson. Saros earned his first career shutout in a 4–0 victory over the Blues.

==== January ====
On January 3 at home, the contest against the Montreal Canadiens played out as a goaltender duel between Carey Price, with 22 saves, and Rinne, with 41 saves, until it was broken up by Fiala scoring for the Predators with 53 seconds remaining in the second period. Four minutes into the third period, former Predators captain Shea Weber, playing his first game in Nashville since being traded to Montreal prior to the start of the season, scored the tying goal that sent the game into overtime. With 19 seconds remaining in overtime, Max Pacioretty scored the game-winning goal and the Predators fell 2–1. Two nights later on January 5 away against Tampa Bay, Colton Sissons led a high-scoring attack with his first career hat-trick and goals from Ellis, Fisher and Forsberg in a 6–1 Predators victory. The next night in Sunrise, Florida, the Predators failed to build on their high-scoring victory from the night before as Smith scored their only goal in a 2–1 loss to the Panthers. Traveling up to Chicago on January 8, the Predators – being without top scorers Arvidsson, Neal, Subban and Wilson the entire road trip – mustered only two goals by Ekholm and Watson in a 5–2 loss to the Blackhawks.

Back in Nashville on January 10 to face the Vancouver Canucks, Watson put the Predators on the board 35 seconds into the second period. The Predators controlled the game the rest of the way until Brandon Sutter scored the tying goal for the Canucks with 49 seconds remaining in regulation and sent the contest into overtime. Facing a four-on-three power play situation, Jarnkrok scored the game-winning, short-handed goal with one second remaining in overtime to give the Predators a 2–1 victory over the Canucks, their first non-shootout overtime victory of the season. Two nights later, Watson and Forsberg scored for the Predators while Saros made 35 saves in a 2–1 victory over the Boston Bruins. Making their third trip of the season to Denver on January 14, the Predators gave up two goals to start the game but scored three unanswered goals – credited to Fisher, Foresberg and Cody McLeod, whom the Predators acquired in a trade with the Avalanche the day prior – to win 3–2.

Flying up to Vancouver on January 17, Canucks center Henrik Sedin scored the lone goal of the game with seven-and-a-half minutes remaining in the game to hand the Predators their third shutout loss of the season and snap a three-game win streak. A Derek Grant goal in the first period for the Predators was overturned on review, despite such a play not being reviewable by NHL rules, after the NHL declared that game referee Ghislain Hebert, who was standing behind the net when the goal was scored, "was in the process of blowing his whistle to stop play when Miller covered the puck with his blocker before the puck crossed the goal line". Continuing their swing through Canada on January 19 in Calgary, the Predators jumped to a 4–0 lead – thanks to Ellis (two goals), Forsberg and Neal – at the beginning of the third period. Saros made 32 saves and held off a three-goal rally in the final four minutes of the game to beat the Flames 4–3. The next night in Edmonton, Ardvisson and Ellis scored for the Predators, while goals by Matt Hendricks and Milan Lucic of the Oilers sent the contest into overtime. Ellis and Neal scored in shootout to give the Predators a 3–2 victory over the Oilers. Back in the United States on January 22 to conclude their five-game road trip, the Predators scored four unanswered goals – thanks to Forsberg (two), Johansen and Neal – to overcome a two-goal deficit, defeat the Minnesota Wild 4–2 and give head coach Peter Laviolette his 500th career victory.

Back in Nashville on January 24, the contest played out as an even match-up with the Predators and Buffalo Sabres matching one another goal for goal, until the Predators took control of the game in the third period with a go-ahead goal by Arvidsson and a goal by Neal a few minutes later. With less than six minutes remaining, Brian Gionta pulled the Sabres within a goal by scoring one on Saros's blindspot and tied the game, and subsequently sent it into overtime, with a Kyle Okposo goal with 65 seconds remaining. Two-and-a-half minutes into overtime, Jack Eichel broke past Subban and Wilson, got off a shot and snapped a three-game win streak for the Predators at 5–4. Two nights later, in their final game prior to the All-Star break, the Predators – thanks to goals from Jarnkrok, two goals from Smith and Harry Zolnierczyk – held off a late comeback by the Columbus Blue Jackets in a 4–3 victory.

Closing out the month of January on the road in Pittsburgh, the Predators mustered just two goals, by Järnkrok and Wilson, and fell 4–2 to the Penguins.

==== February ====
On February 2 in Nashville, Arvidsson and Johansen scored for the Predators, and Rinne put up 31 saves to earn his second shutout of the season to lead the Predators to their seventh–straight win over the Edmonton Oilers. Two nights later, the Predators fell 1–0 to the Detroit Red Wings.

Facing Vancouver on February 7, the Predators rebounded from their shutout loss against Detroit – with goals from Arvidsson, Fisher, Forsberg (whose goal was initially waved off but restored after video review showed the puck crossing the line under Jacob Markström's glove) and Järnkrok – with a 4–2 victory over the Canucks. On the road at Madison Square Garden two nights later, Järnkrok and McLeod put the Predators up to a two–goal lead, but a power play goal by Josi in the third period could not overcome four–unanswered goals by the New York Rangers, and the Predators fell 4–3. Back in Nashville on February 11, Arvidsson recorded a hat trick and Josi scored for the Predators, but it was not enough to overcome surrendering four goals in the second period in a 7–4 loss to the Florida Panthers. The next day against division rival Dallas, the Stars got off to a three–goal lead, two of which came on power play goals (one being a 5–on–3 power play) thanks to undisciplined play by the Predators. Late in the second period, the Predators – with goals from Fisher, Forsberg, Järnkrok and two from Josi – scored five–unanswered goals to defeat the Stars 5–3.

Traveling up to Saint Paul, Minnesota, to face the Wild following a five–day break, Subban and Wilson scored to pull the Predators within a goal midway through the third period. But a breakaway goal by Jason Zucker and an empty net goal by Eric Staal sealed a 5–2 victory for the Wild. The next evening in Columbus, Ohio, the Predators and Blue Jackets matched one another point–for–point with goals from Ellis, Fiala, Järnkrok and Mattias, who scored the game–winning goal that broke a 3–3 tie halfway through the third period, and Saros made 35 saves in a 4–3 victory over the Blue Jackets.

Back home in Nashville on February 21 to face Calgary, the Predators fell into a three–goal deficit early in the contest but rallied with a four–goal second period – three of which came from Forsberg, earning him his third career hat trick, and Wilson – to take a one–goal lead at 5–4. Midway through the third period, Mikael Backlund scored the tying goal for the Flames, and the game went into overtime. Forty–three seconds into overtime, Mark Giordano scored the winning goal for the Flames, and the Predators fell 6–5. Two nights later, Forsberg achieved back–to–back hat tricks and led the Predators to a season sweep of the Colorado Avalanche in a 4–2 victory. On Saturday, Forsberg, Arvidsson, and Fisher scored a goal each, and Josi scored 2 goals, giving the Predators a 5–2 victory over the Washington Capitals. The next night, the Predators – with goals from Arvidsson, Ellis, Vernon Fiddler, Forsberg and Wilson – scored their ninth straight win over the Edmonton Oilers in a 5–4 victory.

Closing out the month of February on the road in Buffalo, the Predators and Sabres, the Sabres jumped to a two–score lead, the Predators responded with goals from Fisher and Wilson, and a third goal by the Sabres ended of the second period. After the Sabres jumped to a 4–2 lead early in the third period, Forsberg and Johansen led a two–goal rally to tie the game and send it into overtime. After a successful 4 on 2 penalty kill, Forsberg scored two minutes and 45 seconds into overtime and handed the Predators a 4–2 victory.

==== March ====
Traveling up to Montreal on March 2, Ellis put the Predators on the board with a first period goal but surrendered a tying goal by Brendan Gallagher midway through the third period and a breakaway Paul Byron goal with nine seconds remaining to fall 2–1 to the Canadiens. Back home two nights later, the Predators kept themselves in contention against Chicago with goals from Arvidsson (with two) and Järnkrok, but Brian Campbell put the game away with a wrist shot goal with only 65 seconds remaining – and Kane padded the score with an empty net goal – to hand the Predators a 5–3 loss.

On the road in Anaheim, California, on March 7, the Predators and Ducks played to a three-goal tie in regulation with goals by Ellis, Forsberg, and Wilson for the Predators and goals by Ryan Getzlaf, Rickard Rakell, and Nick Ritchie of the Ducks. In the fifth round of shootout, Patrick Eaves shot the winning goal past Rinne to hand the Ducks a 4–3 victory. Two nights later across town in Los Angeles, the Predators and Kings played to a two–goal tie in regulation with goals by Fiala and Järnkrok and goals by Marián Gáborík and Jarome Iginla of the Kings. With less than 90 seconds remaining in overtime, Iginla scored his second goal of the game, and winning goal, to beat the Predators 3–2. Concluding their three–game swing through California on March 11 in San Jose, the Predators – with goals by Arvidsson (short–hand empty net), Johansen and Neal, and 25 saves by Saros, including four penalty kills – snapped a four–game losing skid with a 3–1 win over the Sharks.

In Nashville on March 13, the Predators and Winnipeg Jets matched each other point for point through the contest – with goals by Fisher, Forsberg, Neal, and Watson for the Predators, and Joel Armia, Dustin Byfuglien, Patrik Laine, and Blake Wheeler for the Jets – and it went into overtime. On the power play, Neal fired a wrist shot past Jets goalie Connor Hellebuyck, and the Predators won 5–4. On the road in Washington, D.C., three nights later, the Capitals put the first point on the board with a goal from Brett Connolly. Neal tied the game for the Predators with 64 seconds remaining in the second period, and it went into overtime. Sixty–five seconds into overtime, Arvidsson scored the winning goal, and the Predators won 2–1. Ending their two–game road trip in Raleigh, North Carolina, on March 18, goals from Arvidsson and Forsberg could not lift the Predators past allowing the first two goals and an empty net goal in the closing seconds in a 4–2 loss to the Carolina Hurricanes.

Back in Nashville on March 20 against Arizona, Arvidsson and Ellis scored for the Predators to retake third in the Central Division in a 3–1 victory that also eliminated the Coyotes from playoff contention. The hunt for third in the Central Division continued two nights later when Ellis, Järnkrok and Sissons scored to put the Predators over the Calgary Flames 3–1. On March 26, Neal and Sissons scored twice and Arvidsson, McLeod, and Subban scored – keeping the Predators in the hunt for third in the Central Division – in a 7–2 win over the San Jose Sharks.

In Brooklyn on March 27, the Predators – thanks to Arvidsson, Fiala, and Johansen – won their fourth straight game, matching their longest win streak of the season in a 3–1 victory over the New York Islanders. The next night in Boston, Smith put the Predators on the board in a 4–1 loss to the Bruins that ended their four–game win streak. Returning to Nashville on March 30, Forsberg's 30th goal of the season and outshooting Toronto 13–2 in the third period was not enough to overcome a second period two–goal deficit, and the Predators lost 3–1 to the Maple Leafs.

==== April ====
On April 1, the Predators – thanks to goals from Fiala and Forsberg, and an empty net goal by Subban – pulled to a tie for third in the Central Division after a 3–0 win over the Minnesota Wild. The next night in St. Louis, Johansen scored the lone goal for the Predators in a 4–1 loss to the Blues. The day ended with the Predators clinching a playoff spot after the Los Angeles Kings were eliminated in a 2–1 loss to the Arizona Coyotes.

Back in Nashville for the final time in the regular season on April 4, the Predators – with a goal from Fisher – and New York Islanders – with a goal from Brock Nelson – played to a tie in regulation. Thomas Hickey scored the winning goal in overtime and the Predators took the consolation point in a 2–1 overtime loss. On the road in Dallas on April 7, Arvidsson (2), Fiala, Josi, Smith (2), and Harry Zolnierczyk scored in a 7–3 win over the Stars. Closing out the regular season in Winnipeg, the Predators failed to better their playoff seeding and locked themselves into a first round match-up with the Chicago Blackhawks in a 2–1 loss to the Jets.

=== Postseason ===
==== First round: Chicago ====
On April 13, the Predators began their first postseason series of 2017 on the road. In Game 1, the Predators scored first against the Chicago Blackhawks when Arvidsson redirected Forsberg's shot on goal past goalie Corey Crawford midway through the first period, and Rinne recorded 29 saves, despite the Blackhawks controlling the defensive zone of the Predators for much of the last two periods. Two nights later in Game 2, Rinne's 30 saves led to another shutout of the Blackhawks, and goals from Ellis, Fiala, Johansen, Sissons, and Zolnierczyk gave the Predators a 5–0 victory. The Blackhawks' scoring drought ended when Dennis Rasmussen and Patrick Kane scored in the second period of Game 3 on April 17 in Nashville. Forsberg's two goals tied the game, and Fiala scored the winning goal 16:44 into overtime to give the Predators a three-game lead in the series. Rinne stopped all but one shot, and Josi scored twice to complete their first sweep in franchise history in a 4–1 victory over the Blackhawks on April 20.

==== Second round: St. Louis ====
In Game 1, Colton Parayko, Jaden Schwartz, and Vladimir Sobotka each scored in the third period to tie the contest for the St. Louis Blues after Forsberg, Subban, and Wilson scored in the first two periods. Fiddler scored the winning goal to give the Predators a 4–3 win on April 26. The Predators spent 11 minutes on penalty kill to two by the Blues in Game 2, contributing to the Blues' comeback at the stick of Vladimir Tarasenko, and saw their five-game playoff win streak snapped in a 3–2 loss. The offensive-oriented defensemen of the Predators played the biggest role in scoring for Game 3 on April 30, with two of three goals coming from Ellis and Josi, to give them a 3–1 victory and 2–1 series lead over the Blues. Rinne saved 32 of 33 shots, and Ellis and Neal scored in the third period to give the Predators a 3–1 series advantage in Game 4 on May 2. Dmitrij Jaškin and Jaden Schwartz of the Blues denied the Predators an opportunity to clinch the series with a 2–1 victory in Game 5 on May 5. After giving up the first goal in Game 6, the Predators scored three unanswered goals to send them to their first Conference Final appearance in franchise history.

==== Western Conference Final: Anaheim ====
In game one, the Predators and the Anaheim Ducks matched each other goal for goal in regulation, with Forsberg and Watson scoring for the Predators, and Hampus Lindholm and Jakob Silfverberg scoring for the Ducks. During overtime, Neal made a shot that bounced off the right shoulder of Ducks forward Corey Perry and went over Ducks goalie John Gibson to give the Predators a 3–2 victory. Rinne, who entered with the best goals against average of goalies in the 2017 playoffs, allowed a playoff–high four goals in a 5–3 loss to the Ducks in game two on May 14. In Nashville for game three on May 16, Rinne blocked 19 of 20 shots, and Forsberg and Josi scored, keeping the perfect postseason home record of the Predators intact with a 2–1 victory. The Predators found themselves in a two–goal hole with under seven minutes remaining in regulation in game four on May 18, but Subban's shot with six minutes and 27 seconds to go and Forsberg's goal with 34 seconds left sent the game into overtime. During overtime, Ducks forward Perry shot the puck at the front of the net, which bounced off Subban's stick past Rinne for the winning goal in a 3–2 victory over the Predators. Despite losing their first home playoff game in over a year, the Predators moved to one win away from their first Stanley Cup Final appearance with a 3–1 victory over the Ducks in game five on May 20. Sissons recorded a hat-trick, the second playoff hat-trick in Predators history, sending the Predators to their first Stanley Cup Final with a 6–3 victory in game six over the Ducks on May 22.

==== Stanley Cup Final: Pittsburgh ====
Game one of the 2017 Stanley Cup Final opened on May 29 with a goal by P. K. Subban, which was overturned after the Pittsburgh Penguins challenged that Forsberg was offside. Two minutes later in the first period, the Penguins took control of the game with a three-goal swing and went into the first intermission with a 3–0 lead. Over the course of the next 37 minutes, the Nashville Predators erased the deficit with a three-goal rally and held the Penguins to zero shots on goal through the second period and part of the third period. The feat marked the first time a team was held to no shots in a period during a Stanley Cup Final since the NHL started tracking the statistic in 1957–58. Jake Guentzel ended the Penguins' shot on goal drought with the game–winning goal with three minutes and 17 seconds remaining in the game, and a subsequent empty netter with 62 seconds remaining by Nick Bonino, to take game one at 5–3.

The Predators struck first in game two on May 31 with a goal by Pontus Aberg, but Guentzel evened the score with three-and-a-half minutes left in the first period. The Predators controlled the puck for most of the game, shooting a combined 32 shots on goal (18 in the first and 14 in the second) to the Penguins' 19 (12 in the first and seven in the second), but did not convert more than one into a goal. The Penguins opened a three-goal barrage ten seconds into the third period, then scored two goals in the span of 15 seconds, the latter of which resulted in Saros playing the rest of the game in place of Rinne, to give the Penguins game two at 4–1.

Guentzel put the Penguins on top with an early goal in the first period of game three on June 3, but could not capitalize on three power play opportunities, or a bouncing shot from defenseman Ron Hainsey. While sloppy play in the first period slowed the Predators down, the momentum swung their way when Josi shot from the right face-off circle and scored on a power play goal roughly six minutes into the second period. Gaudreau scored 42 seconds later, Neal scored with 22.6 seconds remaining in the period and Smith and Ekholm scored in the third period to give the Predators their first ever Stanley Cup Final game victory at 5–1.

Smith deflected Watson's shot and Jarnkrok, on the rebound, shot the puck past Matt Murray to give the Predators a 1–0 lead nearly 15 minutes into the first period of game four on June 5. Penguins captain Sidney Crosby got the puck on a breakaway just over a minute later and beat Rinne on a forehand-to-backhand move to tie the game. Gaudreau scored on a wrap-around, after an official review, that proved to be the winning goal – cemented by Arvidsson's breakaway goal and an empty-netter by Forsberg – of a 4–1 series-tying game four victory.

Returning to Pittsburgh, the Predators lost 6–0 before being eliminated at home 2–0 in game six of the Final after a waved-off goal by Colton Sissons followed by two goals by the Penguins.

== Standings ==
Central Division
Pos	Team	GP	W	L	OTL	ROW	GF	GA	GD	Pts
1	z – Chicago Blackhawks	82	50	23	9	46	244	213	+31	109
2	x – Minnesota Wild	82	49	25	8	46	266	208	+58	106
3	x – St. Louis Blues	82	46	29	7	44	235	218	+17	99
4	x – Nashville Predators	82	41	29	12	39	240	224	+16	94
5	Winnipeg Jets	82	40	35	7	37	249	256	−7	87
6	Dallas Stars	82	34	37	11	33	223	262	−39	79
7	Colorado Avalanche	82	22	56	4	21	166	278	−112	48

Source: National Hockey League
x – Clinched playoff spot; z – Clinched conference

Western Conference Wild Card
Pos	Div	Team	GP	W	L	OTL	ROW	GF	GA	GD	Pts
1	PA	x – Calgary Flames	82	45	33	4	41	226	221	+5	94
2	CE	x – Nashville Predators	82	41	29	12	39	240	224	+16	94
3	CE	Winnipeg Jets	82	40	35	7	37	249	256	−7	87
4	PA	Los Angeles Kings	82	39	35	8	37	201	205	−4	86
5	CE	Dallas Stars	82	34	37	11	33	223	262	−39	79
6	PA	Arizona Coyotes	82	30	42	10	24	197	260	−63	70
7	PA	Vancouver Canucks	82	30	43	9	26	182	243	−61	69
8	CE	Colorado Avalanche	82	22	56	4	21	166	278	−112	48

Source: National Hockey League
x – Clinched playoff spot

== Schedule and results ==
=== Pre-season ===
2016 pre-season game log: 2–2–2 (home: 1–0–1; road: 1–2–1)
#	Date	Visitor	Score	Home	OT	Decision	Attendance	Record	Recap
1^{[A]}	September 27	Nashville	1–4	Florida		Mazanec	—	0–1–0	Recap
2^{[A]}	September 27	Nashville	2–1	Florida		Saros	—	1–1–0	Recap
3	September 29	Nashville	2–3	Columbus	OT	Saros	8,644	1–1–1	Recap
4	October 1	Tampa Bay	3–4	Nashville		Mazanec	17,113	2–1–1	Recap
5	October 4	Columbus	3–2	Nashville	OT	Rinne	16,432	2–1–2	Recap
6	October 8	Nashville	3–5	Tampa Bay		Rinne	17,095	2–2–2	Recap
^{A} – indicates split-squad game.

=== Regular season ===
2016–17 game log

October: 2–5–1 (home: 2–1–0; road: 0–4–1)
#	Date	Visitor	Score	Home	OT	Decision	Attendance	Record	Pts	Recap
1	October 14	Chicago	2–3	Nashville		Rinne	17,256	1–0–0	2	Recap
2	October 15	Nashville	3–5	Chicago		Mazanec	21,665	1–1–0	2	Recap
3	October 18	Dallas	2–1	Nashville		Rinne	17,113	1–2–0	2	Recap
4	October 21	Nashville	3–5	Detroit		Rinne	20,027	1–3–0	2	Recap
5	October 22	Pittsburgh	1–5	Nashville		Saros	17,113	2–3–0	4	Recap
6	October 26	Nashville	1–6	Anaheim		Rinne	15,421	2–4–0	4	Recap
7	October 27	Nashville	2–3	Los Angeles	OT	Rinne	18,230	2–4–1	5	Recap
8	October 29	Nashville	1–3	San Jose		Rinne	17,562	2–5–1	5	Recap

November: 9–3–2 (home: 6–0–1; road: 3–3–1)
#	Date	Visitor	Score	Home	OT	Decision	Attendance	Record	Pts	Recap
9	November 1	Nashville	5–1	Colorado		Rinne	12,142	3–5–1	7	Recap
10	November 3	Nashville	2–3	Arizona	SO	Rinne	10,745	3–5–2	8	Recap
11	November 5	Carolina	3–2	Nashville	SO	Rinne	17,113	3–5–3	9	Recap
12	November 8	Ottawa	1–3	Nashville		Rinne	17,113	4–5–3	11	Recap
13	November 10	St. Louis	1–3	Nashville		Rinne	17,259	5–5–3	13	Recap
14	November 12	Anaheim	0–5	Nashville		Rinne	17,309	6–5–3	15	Recap
15	November 15	Nashville	2–6	Toronto		Mazanec	19,342	6–6–3	15	Recap
16	November 17	Nashville	5–1	Ottawa		Rinne	15,480	7–6–3	17	Recap
17	November 19	Nashville	1–3	St. Louis		Rinne	18,922	7–7–3	17	Recap
18	November 21	Tampa Bay	1–3	Nashville		Rinne	17,113	8–7–3	19	Recap
19	November 23	Dallas	2–5	Nashville		Rinne	17,119	9–7–3	21	Recap
20	November 25	Winnipeg	1–5	Nashville		Rinne	17,192	10–7–3	23	Recap
21	November 27	Nashville	0–3	Winnipeg		Saros	15,294	10–8–3	23	Recap
22	November 29	Nashville	5–3	Colorado		Rinne	12,082	11–8–3	25	Recap

December: 5–6–3 (home: 2–4–3; road: 3–2–0)
#	Date	Visitor	Score	Home	OT	Decision	Attendance	Record	Pts	Recap
23	December 3	New Jersey	5–4	Nashville	OT	Rinne	17,113	11–8–4	26	Recap
24	December 4	Philadelphia	4–2	Nashville		Saros	17,113	11–9–4	26	Recap
25	December 6	Colorado	3–4	Nashville		Rinne	17,113	12–9–4	28	Recap
26	December 8	Nashville	2–5	Dallas		Rinne	17,887	12–10–4	28	Recap
27	December 10	Nashville	1–4	Arizona		Rinne	13,820	12–11–4	28	Recap
28	December 13	St. Louis	3–6	Nashville		Rinne	17,113	13–11–4	30	Recap
29	December 15	Minnesota	5–2	Nashville		Rinne	17,113	13–12–4	30	Recap
30	December 17	NY Rangers	2–1	Nashville	SO	Saros	17,113	13–12–5	31	Recap
31	December 19	Nashville	2–1	Philadelphia	SO	Rinne	19,660	14–12–5	33	Recap
32	December 20	Nashville	5–1	New Jersey		Saros	13,744	15–12–5	35	Recap
33	December 22	Los Angeles	4–0	Nashville		Rinne	17,156	15–13–5	35	Recap
34	December 27	Minnesota	3–2	Nashville	OT	Rinne	17,141	15–13–6	36	Recap
35	December 29	Chicago	3–2	Nashville		Rinne	17,229	15–14–6	36	Recap
36	December 30	Nashville	4–0	St. Louis		Saros	19,483	16–14–6	38	Recap

January: 8–4–2 (home: 3–0–2; road: 5–4–0)
#	Date	Visitor	Score	Home	OT	Decision	Attendance	Record	Pts	Recap
37	January 3	Montreal	2–1	Nashville	OT	Rinne	17,113	16–14–7	39	Recap
38	January 5	Nashville	6–1	Tampa Bay		Rinne	19,092	17–14–7	41	Recap
39	January 6	Nashville	1–2	Florida		Saros	14,003	17–15–7	41	Recap
40	January 8	Nashville	2–5	Chicago		Rinne	21,658	17–16–7	41	Recap
41	January 10	Vancouver	1–2	Nashville	OT	Rinne	17,113	18–16–7	43	Recap
42	January 12	Boston	1–2	Nashville		Saros	17,113	19–16–7	45	Recap
43	January 14	Nashville	3–2	Colorado		Rinne	16,096	20–16–7	47	Recap
44	January 17	Nashville	0–1	Vancouver		Rinne	18,312	20–17–7	47	Recap
45	January 19	Nashville	4–3	Calgary		Saros	18,904	21–17–7	49	Recap
46	January 20	Nashville	3–2	Edmonton	SO	Rinne	18,347	22–17–7	51	Recap
47	January 22	Nashville	4–2	Minnesota		Rinne	19,087	23–17–7	53	Recap
48	January 24	Buffalo	5–4	Nashville	OT	Saros	17,113	23–17–8	54	Recap
49	January 26	Columbus	3–4	Nashville		Rinne	17,113	24–17–8	56	Recap
January 27–29		All-Star Break in Los Angeles
50	January 31	Nashville	2–4	Pittsburgh		Rinne	18,455	24–18–8	56	Recap

February: 8–4–1 (home: 6–2–1; road: 2–2–0)
#	Date	Visitor	Score	Home	OT	Decision	Attendance	Record	Pts	Recap
51	February 2	Edmonton	0–2	Nashville		Rinne	17,113	25–18–8	58	Recap
52	February 4	Detroit	1–0	Nashville		Rinne	17,204	25–19–8	58	Recap
53	February 7	Vancouver	2–4	Nashville		Rinne	17,113	26–19–8	60	Recap
54	February 9	Nashville	3–4	NY Rangers		Saros	18,006	26–20–8	60	Recap
55	February 11	Florida	7–4	Nashville		Saros	17,113	26–21–8	60	Recap
56	February 12	Dallas	3–5	Nashville		Rinne	17,113	27–21–8	62	Recap
57	February 18	Nashville	2–5	Minnesota		Rinne	19,292	27–22–8	62	Recap
58	February 19	Nashville	4–3	Columbus		Saros	17,894	28–22–8	64	Recap
59	February 21	Calgary	6–5	Nashville	OT	Saros	17,113	28–22–9	65	Recap
60	February 23	Colorado	2–4	Nashville		Rinne	17,243	29–22–9	67	Recap
61	February 25	Washington	2–5	Nashville		Saros	17,150	30–22–9	69	Recap
62	February 26	Edmonton	4–5	Nashville		Rinne	17,113	31–22–9	71	Recap
63	February 28	Nashville	5–4	Buffalo	OT	Rinne	18,634	32–22–9	73	Recap

March: 7–5–2 (home: 4–2–0; road: 3–3–2)
#	Date	Visitor	Score	Home	OT	Decision	Attendance	Record	Pts	Recap
64	March 2	Nashville	1–2	Montreal		Rinne	21,288	32–23–9	73	Recap
65	March 4	Chicago	5–3	Nashville		Saros	17,297	32–24–9	73	Recap
66	March 7	Nashville	3–4	Anaheim	SO	Rinne	14,622	32–24–10	74	Recap
67	March 9	Nashville	2–3	Los Angeles	OT	Rinne	18,230	32–24–11	75	Recap
68	March 11	Nashville	3–1	San Jose		Saros	17,497	33–24–11	77	Recap
69	March 13	Winnipeg	4–5	Nashville	OT	Rinne	17,355	34–24–11	79	Recap
70	March 16	Nashville	2–1	Washington	OT	Rinne	18,506	35–24–11	81	Recap
71	March 18	Nashville	2–4	Carolina		Saros	10,707	35–25–11	81	Recap
72	March 20	Arizona	1–3	Nashville		Rinne	17,113	36–25–11	83	Recap
73	March 23	Calgary	1–3	Nashville		Rinne	17,324	37–25–11	85	Recap
74	March 25	San Jose	2–7	Nashville		Rinne	17,282	38–25–11	87	Recap
75	March 27	Nashville	3–1	NY Islanders		Saros	11,671	39–25–11	89	Recap
76	March 28	Nashville	1–4	Boston		Rinne	17,565	39–26–11	89	Recap
77	March 30	Toronto	3–1	Nashville		Rinne	17,214	39–27–11	89	Recap

April: 2–2–1 (home: 1–0–1; road: 1–2–0)
#	Date	Visitor	Score	Home	OT	Decision	Attendance	Record	Pts	Recap
78	April 1	Minnesota	0–3	Nashville		Rinne	17,113	40–27–11	91	Recap
79	April 2	Nashville	1–4	St. Louis		Saros	19,262	40–28–11	91	Recap
80	April 4	NY Islanders	2–1	Nashville	OT	Rinne	17,113	40–28–12	92	Recap
81	April 6	Nashville	7–3	Dallas		Saros	17,543	41–28–12	94	Recap
82	April 8	Nashville	1–2	Winnipeg		Rinne	15,294	41–29–12	94	Recap

Legend: Win (2 points) Loss (0 points) Overtime/shootout loss (1 point)

=== Playoffs ===
2017 Stanley Cup playoffs

Western Conference first round vs. (C1) Chicago Blackhawks: Nashville wins 4–0
#	Date	Visitor	Score	Home	OT	Decision	Attendance	Series	Recap
1	April 13	Nashville	1–0	Chicago		Rinne	22,075	1–0	Recap
2	April 15	Nashville	5–0	Chicago		Rinne	22,175	2–0	Recap
3	April 17	Chicago	2–3	Nashville	OT	Rinne	17,204	3–0	Recap
4	April 20	Chicago	1–4	Nashville		Rinne	17,326	4–0	Recap

Western Conference second round vs. (C3) St. Louis Blues: Nashville wins 4–2
#	Date	Visitor	Score	Home	OT	Decision	Attendance	Series	Recap
1	April 26	Nashville	4–3	St. Louis		Rinne	19,154	1–0	Recap
2	April 28	Nashville	2–3	St. Louis		Rinne	19,506	1–1	Recap
3	April 30	St. Louis	1–3	Nashville		Rinne	17,220	2–1	Recap
4	May 2	St. Louis	1–2	Nashville		Rinne	17,273	3–1	Recap
5	May 5	Nashville	1–2	St. Louis		Rinne	19,168	3–2	Recap
6	May 7	St. Louis	1–3	Nashville		Rinne	17,240	4–2	Recap

Western Conference Finals vs. (P1) Anaheim Ducks: Nashville wins 4–2
#	Date	Visitor	Score	Home	OT	Decision	Attendance	Series	Recap
1	May 12	Nashville	3–2	Anaheim	OT	Rinne	17,174	1–0	Recap
2	May 14	Nashville	3–5	Anaheim		Rinne	17,174	1–1	Recap
3	May 16	Anaheim	1–2	Nashville		Rinne	17,338	2–1	Recap
4	May 18	Anaheim	3–2	Nashville	OT	Rinne	17,423	2–2	Recap
5	May 20	Nashville	3–1	Anaheim		Rinne	17,307	3–2	Recap
6	May 22	Anaheim	3–6	Nashville		Rinne	17,352	4–2	Recap

Stanley Cup Final vs. (M2) Pittsburgh Penguins: Pittsburgh wins 4–2
#	Date	Visitor	Score	Home	OT	Decision	Attendance	Series	Recap
1	May 29	Nashville	3–5	Pittsburgh		Rinne	18,618	0–1	Recap
2	May 31	Nashville	1–4	Pittsburgh		Rinne	18,643	0–2	Recap
3	June 3	Pittsburgh	1–5	Nashville		Rinne	17,283	1–2	Recap
4	June 5	Pittsburgh	1–4	Nashville		Rinne	17,260	2–2	Recap
5	June 8	Nashville	0–6	Pittsburgh		Rinne	18,605	2–3	Recap
6	June 11	Pittsburgh	2–0	Nashville		Rinne	17,271	2–4	Recap

Legend: Win Loss

== Player stats ==
Final Stats

=== Skaters ===
Regular season
Player	GP	G	A	Pts	+/−	PIM
Viktor Arvidsson	80	31	30	61	16	28
Ryan Johansen	82	14	47	61	1	60
Filip Forsberg	82	31	27	58	−4	32
Roman Josi	72	12	37	49	7	18
Mike Fisher	72	18	24	42	1	55
James Neal	70	23	18	41	−10	35
P. K. Subban	66	10	30	40	−8	44
Ryan Ellis	71	16	22	38	17	29
Colin Wilson	70	12	23	35	7	18
Calle Jarnkrok	81	15	16	31	−1	25
Craig Smith	78	12	17	29	7	30
Mike Ribeiro	46	4	21	25	−5	14
Mattias Ekholm	82	3	20	23	4	34
Austin Watson	77	5	12	17	14	99
Kevin Fiala	54	11	5	16	1	18
Matt Irwin	74	3	11	14	15	26
Colton Sissons	58	8	2	10	11	12
Yannick Weber	73	1	7	8	1	25
Anthony Bitetto	29	0	7	7	−1	25
Cody McLeod^{†}	31	4	1	5	−1	93
Harry Zolnierczyk	24	2	2	4	−2	10
Pontus Aberg	15	1	1	2	−2	4
Reid Boucher^{†‡}	3	1	0	1	1	0
Vernon Fiddler^{†}	20	1	0	1	−4	37
Derek Grant^{†‡}	6	0	1	1	−2	5
P. A. Parenteau^{†}	8	0	1	1	−2	0
Frederick Gaudreau	9	0	1	1	1	0
Matt Carle	6	0	1	1	−1	0
Cody Bass	9	0	0	0	−1	19
Alexandre Carrier	2	0	0	0	1	0
Petter Granberg	10	0	0	0	0	10
Vladislav Kamenev	2	0	0	0	−1	2
Mike Liambas	1	0	0	0	−1	0
Adam Pardy	4	0	0	0	−1	6
Miikka Salomaki	5	0	0	0	−1	2
Trevor Smith	1	0	0	0	0	0

Playoffs
Player	GP	G	A	Pts	+/−	PIM
Filip Forsberg	22	9	7	16	14	14
Roman Josi	22	6	8	14	2	12
Ryan Ellis	22	5	8	13	4	12
Ryan Johansen	14	3	10	13	12	12
Viktor Arvidsson	22	3	10	13	3	19
Colton Sissons	22	6	6	12	7	16
P. K. Subban	22	2	10	12	5	29
Mattias Ekholm	22	1	10	11	6	38
James Neal	22	6	3	9	−8	14
Austin Watson	22	4	5	9	3	28
Calle Jarnkrok	21	2	5	7	−2	2
Pontus Aberg	16	2	3	5	−1	2
Colin Wilson	14	2	2	4	−1	2
Mike Fisher	20	0	4	4	−6	2
Frederick Gaudreau	8	3	0	3	2	0
Craig Smith	10	1	2	3	2	2
Harry Zolnierczyk	11	1	2	3	3	0
Kevin Fiala	5	2	0	2	0	0
Vernon Fiddler	9	1	1	2	−4	25
Matt Irwin	22	0	2	2	−1	4
Cody McLeod	15	1	0	1	−1	27
Yannick Weber	22	0	1	1	0	5
Miikka Salomaki	6	0	0	0	0	2
P. A. Parenteau	5	0	0	0	0	0

=== Goaltenders ===
Regular season
Player	GP	GS	TOI	W	L	OT	GA	GAA	SA	SV%	SO	G	A	PIM
Pekka Rinne	61	61	3,567:47	31	19	9	144	2.42	1,757	.918	3	0	0	4
Juuse Saros	21	19	1,199:55	10	8	3	47	2.35	614	.923	1	0	1	0
Marek Mazanec	4	2	177:35	0	2	0	14	4.73	87	.839	0	0	1	0

Playoffs
Player	GP	GS	TOI	W	L	GA	GAA	SA	SV%	SO	G	A	PIM
Pekka Rinne	22	22	1,288:44	14	8	42	1.96	599	.930	2	0	3	0
Juuse Saros	2	0	56:32	0	0	3	3.18	17	.824	0	0	0	0

^{†}Denotes player spent time with another team before joining the Predators. Stats reflect time with the Predators only.
^{‡}Traded mid-season. Stats reflect time with the Predators only.
Bold/italics denotes franchise record

== Transactions ==
The Predators have been involved in the following transactions during the 2016–17 season.

=== Trades ===
Date	Details		Ref
June 29, 2016	To Montreal Canadiens Shea Weber	To Nashville Predators P. K. Subban
January 13, 2017	To Colorado Avalanche Felix Girard	To Nashville Predators Cody McLeod
January 19, 2017	To Anaheim Ducks Max Gortz	To Nashville Predators Andrew O'Brien
February 4, 2017	To New Jersey Devils 4th-round pick in 2017	To Nashville Predators Vernon Fiddler
March 1, 2017	To New Jersey Devils 6th-round pick in 2017	To Nashville Predators P. A. Parenteau

=== Free agents acquired ===
Date	Player	Former team	Contract terms (in U.S. dollars)	Ref
July 1, 2016	Matt Irwin	Providence Bruins	1 year, $575,000	
July 1, 2016	Yannick Weber	Vancouver Canucks	1 year, $575,000	
July 2, 2016	Trevor Smith	SC Bern	2 years, $1.225 million	
July 2, 2016	Harry Zolnierczyk	San Diego Gulls	1 year, $575,000	
July 6, 2016	Mike Liambas	Rockford IceHogs	1 year, $575,000	
July 27, 2016	Matt Carle	Tampa Bay Lightning	1 year, $700,000	
November 30, 2016	Adam Pardy	Edmonton Oilers	1 year, $575,000	
May 15, 2017	Victor Ejdsell	BIK Karlskoga	2 years, $1.85 million	

=== Free agents lost ===
Date	Player	New team	Contract terms (in U.S. dollars)	Ref
July 1, 2016	Carter Hutton	St. Louis Blues	2 years, $2.25 million	
October 10, 2016	Gabriel Bourque	Colorado Avalanche	1 year, $800,000	

=== Claimed via waivers ===
Player	Previous team	Date	Ref
Reid Boucher	New Jersey Devils	December 3, 2016	
Derek Grant	Buffalo Sabres	January 11, 2017	
Brad Hunt	St. Louis Blues	January 17, 2017	

=== Lost via waivers ===
Player	New team	Date	Ref
Reid Boucher	New Jersey Devils	January 2, 2017	
Derek Grant	Buffalo Sabres	February 6, 2017	

=== Lost via retirement ===
Player	Ref
Paul Gaustad	
Barret Jackman	
Matt Carle	

=== Player signings ===
Date	Player	Contract terms (in U.S. dollars)	Ref
June 27, 2016	Filip Forsberg	6 years, $36 million	
July 26, 2016	Petter Granberg	2 years, $1.225 million	
July 27, 2016	Calle Jarnkrok	6 years, $12 million	
September 28, 2016	Samuel Girard	3 years, entry-level contract	
September 30, 2016	Frederic Allard	3 years, entry-level contract	
January 6, 2017	Matt Irwin	1 year, $650,000 contract extension	
April 10, 2017	Tyler Moy	2 years, $1.85 million entry-level contract	
April 27, 2017	Emil Pettersson	2 years, $1.85 million entry-level contract	
May 17, 2017	Andrew O'Brien	1 year, $650,000 contract extension	
June 14, 2017	Yannick Weber	1 year, $650,000	
June 15, 2017	Joonas Lyytinen	2 years, $1.8 million entry-level contract	

== Draft picks ==
Below are the Nashville Predators' selections at the 2016 NHL entry draft, held in June 2016 at the First Niagara Center in Buffalo.

Round	#	Player	Pos	Nationality	College/Junior/Club team (League)
1	17	Dante Fabbro	D	Canada	Penticton Vees (BCHL)
2	47	Samuel Girard	D	Canada	Shawinigan Cataractes (QMJHL)
3	76^{[a]}	Rem Pitlick	C	Canada	Muskegon Lumberjacks (USHL)
3	78	Frederic Allard	D	Canada	Chicoutimi Saguenéens (QMJHL)
4	108	Hardy Haman-Aktell	D	Sweden	Skellefteå Jr. (Sweden)
5	138	Patrick Harper	C	United States	Avon Old Farms Winged Beavers (US-CT HS)
6	168	Konstantin Volkov	G	Russia	SKA-1946 (MHL)
7	198	Adam Smith	D	Canada	Bowling Green Falcons (NCAA)

=== Notes ===
- ^{[a]} The Minnesota Wild's third-round pick will go to the Nashville Predators as the result of a trade on June 20, 2016, that sent Jimmy Vesey to Buffalo in exchange for this pick.

Buffalo previously acquired this pick as the result of a trade on February 29, 2016, that sent Jamie McGinn to Anaheim in exchange for this pick (being conditional at the time of the trade). The condition – Buffalo will receive a third-round pick in 2016 if Anaheim does not qualify for the 2016 Western Conference Final – was converted on April 27, 2016, when Anaheim was eliminated from the 2016 Stanley Cup playoffs.

Anaheim previously acquired this pick as the result of a trade on June 26, 2015, that sent Kyle Palmieri to New Jersey in exchange for Florida's second-round pick in 2015 and this pick (being conditional at the time of the trade). The condition – Anaheim will receive the higher of either Florida or Minnesota's third-round pick in 2016. – was converted on April 24, 2016, when Minnesota was eliminated from the 2016 Stanley Cup playoffs, ensuring the Wild's pick would be higher than Florida's.

New Jersey previously acquired this pick as the result of a trade on February 26, 2015, that sent Jaromir Jagr to Florida in exchange for a second-round pick in 2015 and this pick.

Florida previously acquired this pick as the result of a trade on February 24, 2015, that sent Sean Bergenheim and a seventh-round pick in 2016 to Minnesota in exchange for this pick.
