= All-Russian Hockey League B =

Russian ice hockey league, 2011-present

- Formerly: Pervaya Liga
- Sport: Ice hockey
- Founded: 2011
- Folded: 2023
- No. of teams: 5 (2022–2023 season)
- Countries: Russia (5 teams)
- Last champion: CSK VVS Samara (1st title)
- Most titles: HC Rostov (3)
- Related competitions: KHL; VHL; MHL; NMHL
- Website: vhl.su

The All-Russian Hockey League B or VHL-B (Russian: Первенство Всероссийской хоккейной лиги (ВХЛ-Б), Pervenstvo Vserossiyskoy hokkeynoy ligi), formerly known as Supreme Hockey League B (Russian: Первенство Высшей хоккейной лиги, Pervenstvo Vysshey hokkeynoy ligi) and Russian Hockey League (Russian: Российская хоккейная лига, Rossiyskaya hokkeynaya liga), was an ice hockey league in Russia. It stood at the third-tier of the Russian ice hockey pyramid, below the second-level VHL and the top-tier KHL. Its final season was 2022/23, and its four surviving teams (Dynamo-Altay, CSK VVS, HC Chelny and Kristall Saratov) joined the VHL.

== History ==
Since 1992, it was the First League of the Russian Ice Hockey Championship. During the 2010–11 season, it was known as the Championship of Russia between the club teams of regions (Russian: Первенство России среди клубных команд регионов, Pervenstvo Rossii sredi klubnykh komand regionov), which was considered a feeder league to both the KHL and the VHL. A majority of the teams were simply junior versions of their professional counterparts. During the era of the Soviet Championship League, it was referred to as "Class B"

The league in 2010–11 featured clubs from the 2009–10 season of the Pervaya Liga and also clubs from the 2009–10 season of the Vysshaya Liga that were not accepted into the VHL for 2010–11.

On August 23, 2011, the FHR announced the creation of the Russian Hockey League that replaced the Pervaya Liga. The league had 2 divisions. The West Division featured teams from both the Central and Povolzhie divisions of the Pervaya Liga. The East Division featured teams from the Ural and West Siberia division as well as teams from the Siberian and Far East division. The Russian Hockey League was also the same name of the organization responsible for organizing the top-tier hockey league of Russia at the time that existed from 1996 and 2008, when it was rebranded and reorganized as the Kontinental Hockey League.

Prior to the beginning of the 2014–15 season, there was a big decrease in league members (with seven teams either leaving to join a different league or disbanding altogether). In connection with this number of losses, FHR officials who ran the league were forced to combine the two territorial divisions into one league table.

After the 2014–15 season and prior to the 2015–16 season, the FHR transferred the organization of the RHL (which had seen its membership numbers plummet from 24 teams in 2011/12 to nine in 2014/15) to the Supreme Hockey League, with the hope of developing a better third-tier competition with an eventual promotion/relegation system with the second-level league thus creating the Supreme Hockey League Championship.

The 2022-23 season ended up the league's final. Before it started, the league, which shrunk to 5 teams at this point, was renamed from "Supreme" to "All-Russian" to match the VHL. During the season, HC Feniks Kazan ran out of funding and folded mid-season. The remaining four teams (Dynamo-Altay, CSK VVS, HC Chelny and Kristall Saratov) played out the season, then joined the VHL. CSK VVS Samara was the league's last champion.

== Prospects for expansion ==
It was planned to replenish the league from the following sources:

- VHL teams, for financial reasons, leaving the league.
- Foreign clubs. For example, interest to the league has been shown by representatives of Latvia.
- Teams from different cities of Russia.
- Independent teams of the MHL and/or the NMHL who left due to reorganization.

== Teams for 2022–2023 ==
Team	City	Arena	Capacity	Founded	Joined league
Dinamo-Altay	(Russia) Barnaul	Titov Sports Palace	3,800	2006	2011
CSK VVS Samara	(Russia) Samara	Vladimir Vysotsky Sport Palace	5,000	1993	2022
Feniks	(Russia) Kazan	Sport Palace	3,345	2022	2022
HC Chelny	(Russia) Naberezhnye Chelny	Ice Palace Naberezhny Chelny	1,500	2004	2016
Kristall	(Russia) Saratov	Ice Sports Palace Saratov	5,000	1946	2017

== Former teams ==
Team	City	Arena	Capacity	Fate of the team
Angel Sibiri	(Russia) Tobolsk	Crystal Sports Complex	Unknown	Unknown
Avangard-Yugra	(Russia) Kogalym	Iceberg Sports Complex	Unknown	Originally joined, but ultimately did not participate; possibly disbanded
Buran Voronezh	(Russia) Voronezh	LDS Jubileiny	3,200	Joined the VHL in 2012
Burevestnik Yekaterinburg	(Russia) Yekaterinburg	KRK Uralets	5,570	Withdrew during 2013–14 season; later disbanded due to connection with financial problems
Burevestnik-1976	(Russia) Tomsk	Crystal Sport Palace	Unknown	Currently, the club performs in the Siberian Student Hockey League
HC Belgorod	(Russia) Belgorod	Oranzevjy led	1,200	Joined the NMHL (then MHL-B) in 2012 due to financial issues
HC Bryansk	(Russia) Bryansk	Desna Stadium	1,000	Joined the NMHL (then MHL-B) in 2014
HC Cheboksary	(Russia) Cheboksary	Cheboksary-Arena	7,500	Disbanded
HC Lipetsk	(Russia) Lipetsk	Zvezdny Sports Complex	2,000	Joined the VHL in 2013; later withdrew in 2015
HC Rostov	(Russia) Rostov-on-Don	Ice Arena	600	Joined the VHL in 2019
HC Tambov	(Russia) Tambov	Crystal Ice Palace	1,200	Joined the VHL in 2018
Junior-Sputnik	(Russia) Nizhny Tagil	Sotnikov Ice Sports Palace	4,200	Club skips season due to financial problems
Kedr Novouralsk	(Russia) Novouralsk	Novouralsk Ice Palace	1,200	Disbanded
Krasnoyarskie Rysi	(Russia) Krasnoyarsk	Arena Sever	2,600	Joined the JHL in 2022
Kristall Elektrostal	(Russia) Elektrostal	Kristall Sport Palace	3,500	Disbanded
Kristall-Yugra Beloyarsky	(Russia) Beloyarsky	Palace of Sports	450	Possibly disbanded
Krylya Sovetov Novosibirsk	(Russia) Novosibirsk	Unknown	-	Disbanded
Neftyanik Almetyevsk-2	(Russia) Almetyevsk	Yubileyny Sports Palace	2,000	Changed name to Sputnik; joined the MHL in 2012 as farm club of Neftyanik (Almetyevsk) (VHL)
Progress Glazov	(Russia) Glazov	Progress Sports Palace	4,300	Joined the NMHL (then MHL-B) in 2014; became farm club of Izhstal (Izhevsk) (VHL)
Rubin Tyumen-2	(Russia) Tyumen	Sports Palace Tyumen	3,300	Unknown
Shakhtyor Prokopyevsk	(Russia) Prokopyevsk	Snowflake Sports Complex	3,150	Due to financial problems, the club decided to go to the Siberian Student Hockey League in 2013
Slavutych Smolensk	(Russia) Smolensk	Ice Palace SGAFKST	1,080	Left league in 2017 due to financial problems
Sokol Novocheboksarsk	(Russia) Novocheboksarsk	LD Sokol	3,000	Disbanded
Soyuz	(Russia) Zarechny	Sports Palace Soyuz	Unknown	Possibly disbanded
THK Tver	(Russia) Tver	Ice Palace Yubileyny	1,980	Joined the VHL in 2012; later declared bankruptcy and ceased in 2017
Yamal Sterkhi	(Russia) Noyabrsk	KSK Fakel	Unknown	Disbanded
Yantar Seversk	(Russia) Seversk	SK North	Unknown	Withdrew from league after 2011–12 season; later disbanded due to financial issues in 2013-14
Yuzhny Ural-Metallurg Orsk	(Russia) Orsk	Unknown	-	Disbanded
Zauralje Kurgan-2	(Russia) Kurgan	Ice Sports Palace Mostovik	2,500	Changed name to Junior and became a youth team joining the MHL and then the NMHL (then MHL-B) in 2012; currently still member of the league

== Champions ==
Season	Champion	Finalist	Series; Result	Bronze Medalist	Regular season winner
2011–12	(Russia) Slavutych Smolensk	(Russia) Buran Voronezh	RR	(Russia) THK Tver	(Russia) Buran Voronezh
2012–13	(Russia) Mordovia Saransk	(Russia) Yamal Sterkhi	3–2	(Russia) Slavutych Smolensk	(Russia) Slavutych Smolensk
2013–14	(Russia) Slavutych Smolensk	(Russia) Mordovia Saransk	^{[NK]}	(Russia) Altai Barnaul & (Russia) Yamal Sterkhi^{[*]}	(Russia) Slavutych Smolensk
2014–15	(Russia) HC Rostov	(Russia) CSK VVS Samara	3–0	(Russia) Mordovia Saransk & (Russia) Slavutych Smolensk^{[*]}	(Russia) Slavutych Smolensk
2015–16	(Russia) HC Tambov	(Russia) HC Rostov	4–1	(Russia) Mordovia Saransk	(Russia) HC Rostov
2016–17	(Russia) HC Rostov	(Russia) Slavutych Smolensk	4–1	(Russia) Mordovia Saransk	(Russia) HC Rostov
2017-18	(Russia) HC Tambov	(Russia) HC Cheboksary	4–0	(Russia) Mordovia Saransk	(Russia) HC Rostov
2018-19	(Russia) HC Rostov	(Russia) Mordovia Saransk	4–0	(Russia) HC Cheboksary & (Russia) Yunior Kurgan ^{[*]}	(Russia) HC Rostov
2019-20	(Russia) HC Chelny^{[**]}	(Russia) HC Cheboksary^{[**]}	RR	(Russia) Dynamo-Altay ^{[**]}	(Russia) HC Chelny
2020-21	(Russia) Krasnoyarskie Rysi	(Russia) Kristall Saratov	4–0	(Russia) Dynamo-Altay & (Russia) HC Cheboksary^{[*]}	(Russia) Dynamo-Altay
2021-22	(Russia) Krasnoyarskie Rysi	(Russia) Kristall Saratov	4–2	(Russia) Dynamo-Altay & (Russia) HC Chelny^{[*]}	(Russia) Dynamo-Altay
2022-23	(Russia) CSK VVS Samara	(Russia) Dynamo-Altay	4–1	(Russia) Kristall Saratov & (Russia) HC Chelny^{[*]}	(Russia) CSK VVS Samara

- ^{[*]}: Both losing semifinalists received bronze medals
- ^{[**]}: Playoffs cancelled, placement determined by the regular season
- ^{[NK]}: Result not known

== See also ==
- Kontinental Hockey League
- VHL
- Junior Hockey League
- NMHL
