= Dmitri Gogolev =

Russian ice hockey player (born 1972)

- Born: November 25, 1972 (age 53) Murmansk, Soviet Union
- Height: 5 ft 9 in (175 cm)
- Weight: 185 lb (84 kg; 13 st 3 lb)
- Position: Right wing
- Shot: Left
- Played for: Krylya Sovetov Moscow; Klagenfurter AC; HC Vítkovice; Metallurg Novokuznetsk; Spartak Moscow; Ak Bars Kazan; Severstal Cherepovets; Metallurg Magnitogorsk; CSKA Moscow; Vityaz Chekhov
- Playing career: 1991–2009

Dmitri Vladimirovich Gogolev (Russian: Дми́трий Влади́мирович Го́голев; born November 25, 1972, in Murmansk, USSR) is a former Russian professional ice hockey forward who last played for Krylya Sovetov team in Russia.

Two of Gogolev's sons are hockey professionals. His eldest son Alexander played in Russia and in the Western Hockey League, while Pavel played in the American Hockey League as of 2023.

== Honours ==
- Italian championship: 1999 (With HC Merano)

== Career statistics ==
			Regular season					Playoffs
Season	Team	League	GP	G	A	Pts	PIM	GP	G	A	Pts	PIM
1990–91	Krylya Sovetov Moscow	USSR	1	0	0	0	0	—	—	—	—	—
1992–93	Krylya Sovetov Moscow	IHL	31	10	4	14	7	7	1	0	1	2
1993–94	Krylya Sovetov Moscow	IHL	46	16	16	32	8	—	—	—	—	—
1994–95	Krylya Sovetov Moscow	IHL	49	21	14	35	10	4	2	3	5	0
1994–95	Soviet Wings	IHL	17	4	6	10	2	—	—	—	—	—
1995–96	Klagenfurter AC	AUT	26	10	15	25	12	—	—	—	—	—
1996–97	Krylya Sovetov Moscow	RSL	36	12	14	26	14	1	1	0	1	0
1997–98	Krylya Sovetov Moscow	RSL	26	3	10	13	2	—	—	—	—	—
1997–98	HC Merano	Serie A	23	21	27	48	12	—	—	—	—	—
1998–99	HC Merano	Serie A	16	13	16	29	4	10	5	7	12	8
1999–00	HC Vítkovice	Extraliga	35	8	17	25	18	—	—	—	—	—
1999–00	Metallurg Novokuznetsk	RSL	9	2	4	6	0	14	3	3	6	6
2000–01	Spartak Moscow	RUS-2	43	30	28	58	2	14	9	8	17	2
2001–02	Spartak Moscow	RSL	51	17	23	40	6	—	—	—	—	—
2002–03	Ak Bars Kazan	RSL	40	3	19	22	10	2	0	0	0	2
2003–04	Severstal Cherepovets	RSL	59	15	21	36	14	—	—	—	—	—
2004–05	Metallurg Magnitogorsk	RSL	45	8	17	25	14	3	0	1	1	0
2005–06	CSKA Moscow	RSL	15	2	1	3	2	—	—	—	—	—
2005–06	Vityaz Chekhov	RSL	28	7	12	19	6	—	—	—	—	—
2006–07	Vityaz Chekhov	RSL	39	10	13	23	12	1	0	0	0	0
2007–08	Krylya Sovetov Moscow	RUS-2	45	19	32	51	32	—	—	—	—	—
2008–09	Krylya Sovetov Moscow	RUS-2	57	18	39	57	18	—	—	—	—	—
