= Platina Chișinău =

- City: Chișinău, Moldova
- League: Minor Hockey League Division B
- Founded: 2010
- Colours: Orange, silver

Platina Chișinău was an ice hockey team in Chișinău, Moldova. They played in the Minor Hockey League Division B before folding in 2015.

== History ==
Platina Chișinău was founded in 2010 and participated in the Romanian U18 Hockey League during the 2010-11 season. They won the championship after defeating SC Miercurea Ciuc in the final, two games to none.

For the 2011-12 season, Platina joined the Romanian Hockey League, initially participating in the first round. They defeated HSC Csíkszereda 9-4 in their first game, but had to forfeit their second game, also against HSC Csíkszereda, due to not having the minimum number of players available to play. A brawl occurred in their third game, a 9-2 win again against HSC Csíkszereda. All players involved were suspended, which forced Platina to forfeit their fourth scheduled game against HSC Csíkszereda, as they did not have enough players available due to the suspensions. After failing to appear for and forfeiting their next two games against CS Progym Gheorgheni, Platina withdrew from the league.

The club joined the Minor Hockey League Division B for the 2012-13 season. They finished in last place in the North-West Division, recording only three points after losing 38 out of 40 games.
