= CSK VVS Samara (ice hockey) =

CSK VVS Samara ЦСК ВВС Самара
- City: Samara, Samara Oblast
- League: VHL; 2017-Present: Russian Hockey League 2000-2017; Russian Superleague 1999-2000; Russian Hockey League 1996-1999; International Hockey League 1993-1996; Russian Supreme League 1990-1993; USSR Championship 1950-1990
- Founded: 1950
- Home arena: CSK VVS Ice Palace (capacity: 4,713)
- Colours
- General manager: Yuri Kovtun
- Head coach: Yuri Mordvintsev
- Captain: Sergey Shikhanov
- Affiliates: Neftekhimik Nizhnekamsk (KHL); Reaktor (MHL)
- Website: cskvvs.com

Franchise history
- CSK VVS Samara 19??-Present; HC Mayak - 19??-19??

CSK VVS Samara (Russian: ЦСК ВВС Самара; lit. Central Sports Club of the Air Force, Samara) are a professional ice hockey team based in Samara, Samara Oblast, Russia. They are currently playing in the Supreme Hockey League, the second level of Russian ice hockey.

CSK were affiliated with HC Lada Togliatti during their tenure in the Kontinental Hockey League. Following Lada's demotion to the VHL at the conclusion of the 2017–18 season, VVS Samara agreed to become the primary affiliate to HC Neftekhimik Nizhnekamsk of the KHL from the 2018–19 season.
