= Artyom Sedunov =

Russian ice hockey player

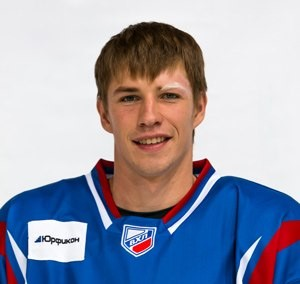
- Born: January 18, 1988 (age 37); Omsk, Russia
- Height: 1.94 m (6 ft 4 in)
- Weight: 87 kg (192 lb; 13 st 10 lb)
- Position: Defence
- Shot: Left
- Played for: Amur Khabarovsk; HC Sochi
- Playing career: 2009–2020

Artyom Sedunov (Russian: Артём Седунов; born January 18, 1988) is a Russian former professional ice hockey defenceman. He last played with Molot-Prikamie Perm of the Supreme Hockey League (VHL).

Sedunov most notably made his Kontinental Hockey League debut playing with Amur Khabarovsk during the 2013–14 season. He also featured briefly with HC Sochi in the following 2014–15 season.
