= Avangard-Yugra Kogalym =

Russian ice hockey team

- City: Kogalym, Russia
- League: Pervaya Liga
- Founded: 2009
- Home arena: Iceberg Arena
- Colours: Red, White

Avangard-Yugra Kogalym is an ice hockey team in Kogalym, Russia. They play in the Pervaya Liga, the third level of Russian ice hockey. The club was founded in 2009.
