= Avangard, Ishimbaysky District, Bashkortostan =

Avangard Авангард
- Village
- Location within Bashkortostan Location within Russia
- Coordinates: 53°17′N 56°16′E
- Country: Russia
- Region: Bashkortostan
- District: Ishimbaysky District
- Time zone: UTC+5:00

Avangard (Russian: Авангард) is a rural locality (a village) in Itkulovsky Selsoviet of Ishimbaysky District, Bashkortostan, Russia. The population was 7 as of 2018.

== Geography ==
Avangard is located 33 km southeast of Ishimbay (the district's administrative centre) by road. Podlesny is the nearest rural locality.

== Ethnicity ==
The village is inhabited by Russians.
