= Gornyak-UGMK =

- City: Verkhnyaya Pyshma
- League: Supreme Hockey League 2017-present: National Junior Hockey League 2012-2017
- Colours
- Head coach: (Russia) Alexei Alexeyev
- Parent club(s): Avtomobilist Yekaterinburg (KHL)

Championships
- Playoff championships: Regions Cup; 2016, 2017

Gornyak-UGMK are a Russian Ice Hockey team based in Verkhnyaya Pyshma, Russia.

== History ==
Founded in 2012, they play in the Supreme Hockey League having joined the league in 2017, and are the farm team of the Kontinental Hockey League's Avtomobilist Yekaterinburg. Prior to joining the VHL, the Miners were a junior team playing in the National Junior Hockey League, where they are two-time champions, having won the Regions Cup in both 2016, and 2017. Gornyak had also made the Regions Cup final in 2015, however lost to Western Conference champions HK Rossosh. In addition to becoming league champions, during their time in the NJHL, Gornyak won the Eastern Conference three times. For the 2021-22 season, Avtomobilist relocated the team from Uchaly to Verkhnyaya Pyshma.

The team is sponsored by Uchaly Mining and Metallurgical Combine.
