= MHK Zelenograd =

Russian ice hockey team

- City: Zelenograd, Russia
- League: Junior Hockey League Division B
- Founded: 2009
- Colours: Green, Yellow

MHK Zelenograd is an ice hockey team in Zelenograd, Russia. They play in the Junior Hockey League Division B, the second level of Russian junior ice hockey. The club was founded in 2009.
