= Lada Arena =

Multi-purpose arena in Tolyatti, Russia

Coordinates: 53°32′36″N 49°18′12″E

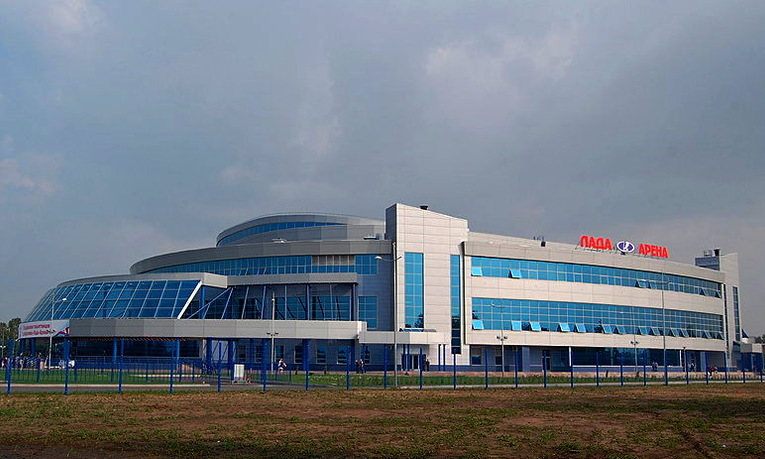
- Interactive map of Lada Arena
- Location: 5 Botanic Street, Tolyatti, Samara region, 445036, Russia
- Elevation: 25 m (82 ft)
- Owner: Ministry of Sports of the Russia
- Operator: GAU Samara region Arena
- Capacity: ice hockey: 6,034
- Surface: Ice
- Field size: 60×26 m
- Acreage: 34.107,9 sq.m
- Parking: Underground parking: 174 cars Outdoor parking: 450 cars 10 buses 18 parking spaces for people with disabilities.

Construction
- Groundbreaking: 2008
- Built: 2008; 2013
- Opened: 9 August 2013; 13 years ago
- Renovated: 2023
- Cost: ₽ 2 967 826 000 (€ 70 128 214 in 2013)
- Architect: Volgatransstroy Group
- General contractor: JSC Avtozavodstroy

Tenant
- Lada Togliatti (KHL)

Website
- tlt-arena.ru

The Lada Arena is a 6,034-seat multi-purpose arena in Tolyatti, Russia. It opened in 2013, and replaced Volgar Sports Palace as the home of KHL ice hockey team, HC Lada Togliatti. The sponsor of the arena is the car manufacturer AvtoVAZ, which has its headquarters in the city.

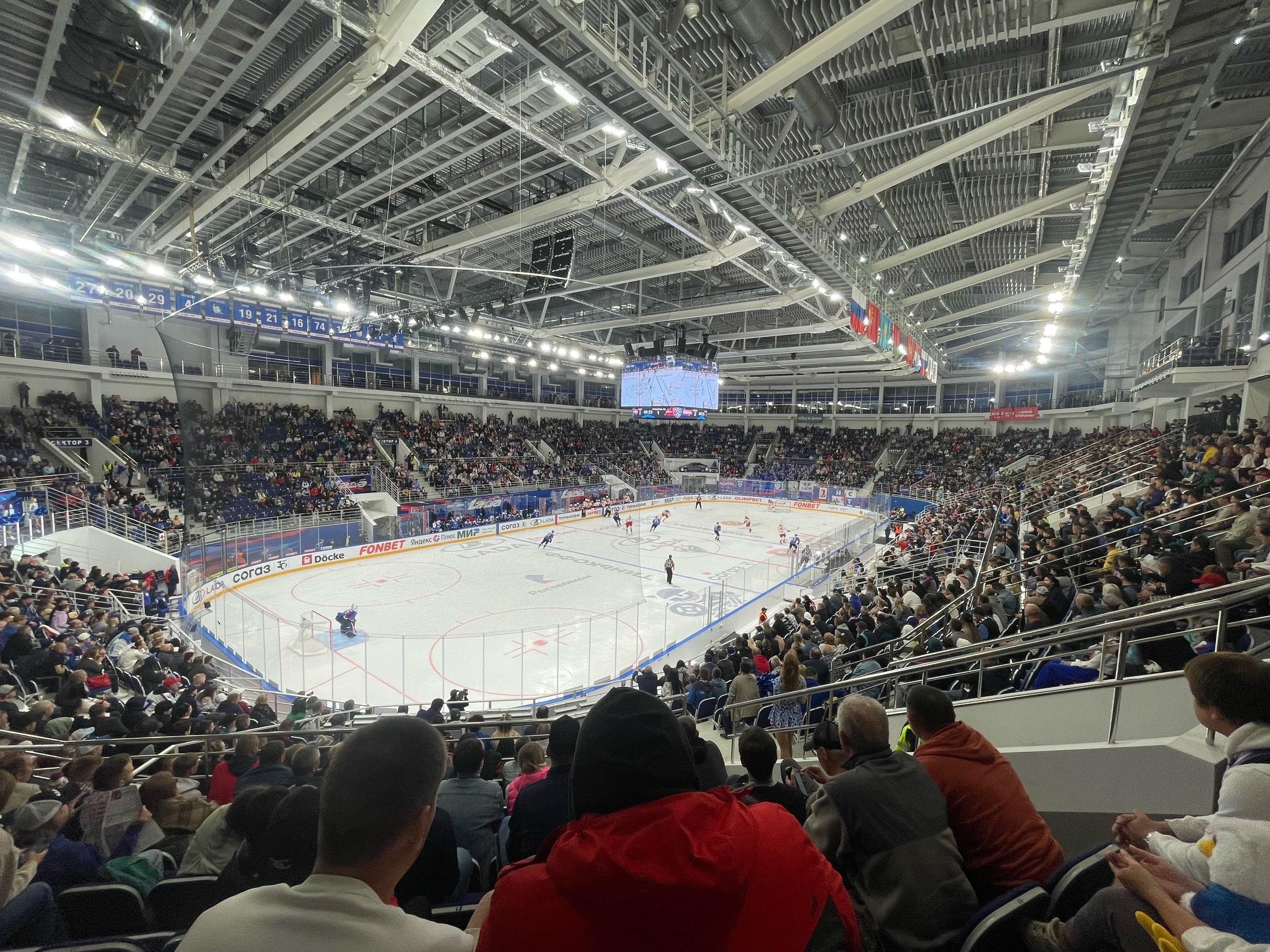
Lada Arena KHL 10.03.2024

== See also ==
- List of indoor arenas in Russia
- List of Kontinental Hockey League arenas
