= Yunior Kurgan =

Russian ice hockey team

- City: Kurgan, Russia
- League: NMHL
- Conference: East
- Founded: 2011
- Home arena: Paryshev Sports Palace (capacity: 2,500)
- Colors
- Affiliate: Zauralie Kurgan (VHL)
- Website: Official Page

Yunior Kurgan (Russian: Юниор Курган) is a junior ice hockey team from Kurgan, farm-club of Zauralie Kurgan. They are members of the National Minor Hockey League (NMHL), the second-level of junior hockey in the country.
