= HC Chelny =

- City: Naberezhnye Chelny, Russia
- League: All-Russian Hockey League
- Founded: 1970
- Home arena: Chelny Sports Palace (capacity: 1,445)
- Colours: Yellow, Blue
- Website: https://hcchelny.com

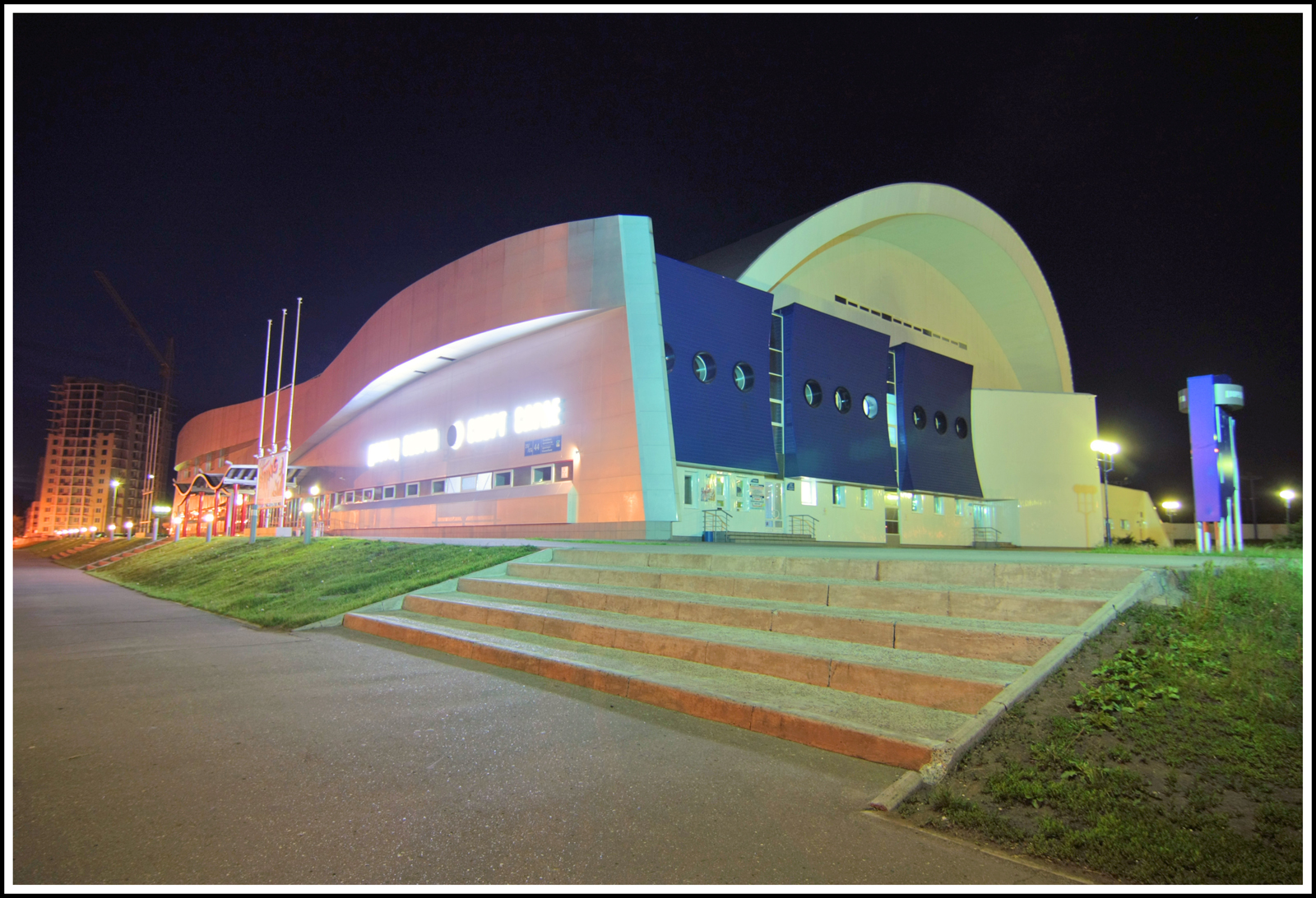
Ice Sports Palace in Naberezhnye Chelny.

HC Chelny is an ice hockey team in Naberezhnye Chelny, Russia. The team plays in the All-Russian Hockey League, the second level of Russian ice hockey. The club was founded in 1970, and joined the VHL in 2023.

== Achievements ==
- Supreme Hockey League Championship (VHL-B) champions: 2019/20 (after the regular season, the playoffs were cancelled)
