= Avangard Stadium =

Avangard Stadium may refer to

- Karasai Stadium, (formerly the Avangard Stadium in Petropavl, Kazakhstan
- Avangard Stadium (Vladivostok), Russia
- Avangard Stadium (Vyborg), Russia
- Avangard Stadium in Domodedovo, Russia
