= Volgar Sports Palace =

Indoor sporting arena in Tolyatti, Russia

Coordinates: 53.505178°N 49.274943°E

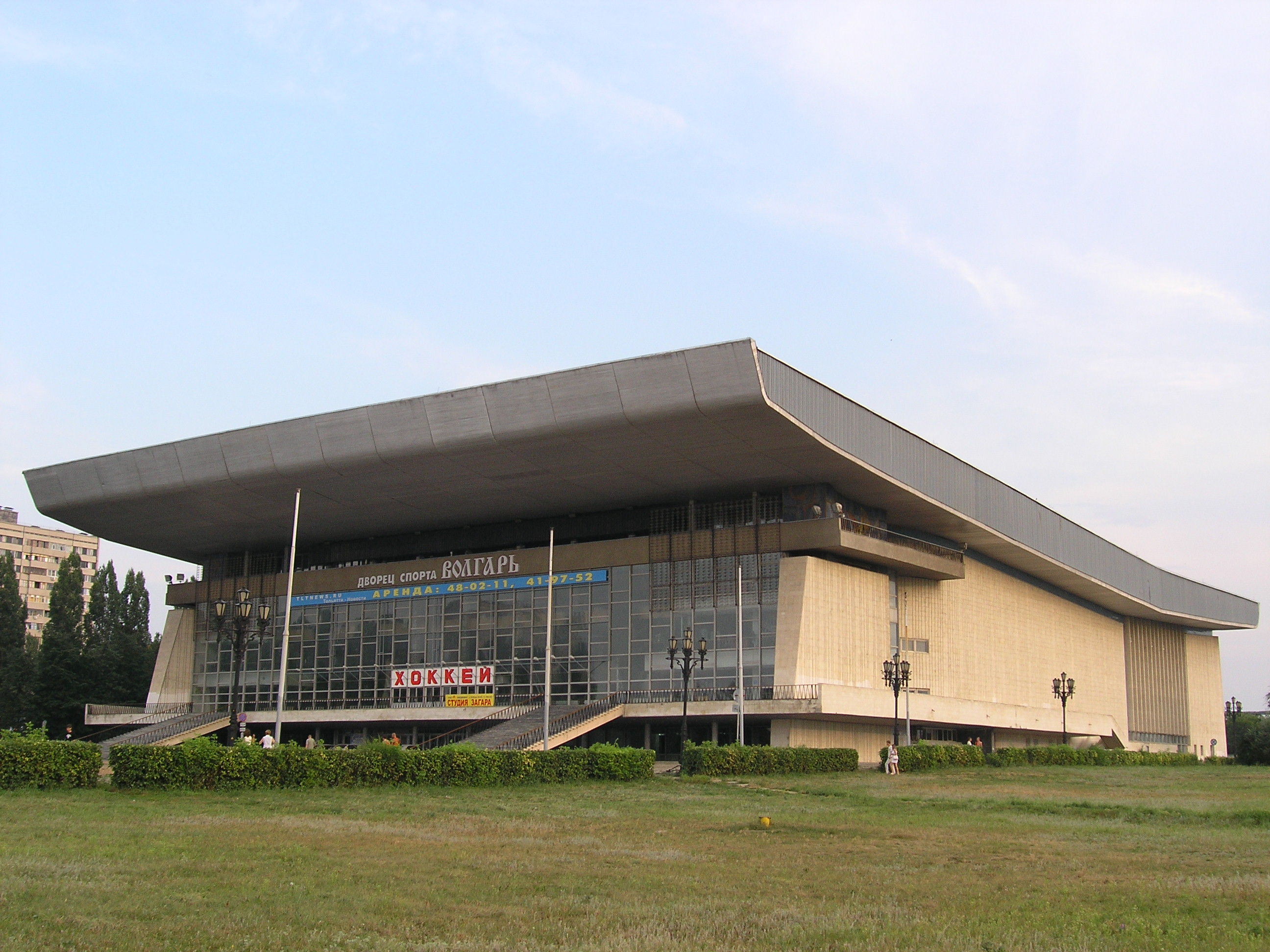
- Interactive map of Volgar Sports Palace
- Location: Tolyatti, Russia

Construction
- Opened: May 8, 1975

Tenants
- HC Lada Togliatti

Volgar Sports Palace is an indoor sporting arena located in Tolyatti, Russia. The capacity of the arena is 2,900. It was the home arena of the HC Lada Togliatti ice hockey until being replaced by Lada Arena. Two other examples of this rare Soviet Modernism design style are the Hala Olivia in Gdansk Poland, and the Vilnius Palace of Concerts and Sports in Vilnius, Lithuania.
