= Lokomotiv Yaroslavl (VHL) =

Former Russian ice hockey team that played in the VHL

Lokomotiv
- City: Yaroslavl, Russia
- League: VHL
- Conference: Western
- Founded: 2011
- Folded: 2013
- Home arena: Arena 2000 (9,070 seats)
- Colours
- Head coach: Petr Vorobiev
- Affiliates: Lokomotiv Yaroslavl (KHL); Loko Yaroslavl (MHL)

Lokomotiv was an ice hockey team in Yaroslavl, Russia. They played in the VHL, the second level of Russian ice hockey. It was a farm club of Lokomotiv Yaroslavl of the Kontinental Hockey League. It was founded for the 2011-12 season after the entire KHL team, along with its coaching staff, died in the 2011 Lokomotiv Yaroslavl plane crash and consisted of MHL players of Loko Yaroslavl. When the franchise rejoined the KHL in its 2012–13 season, it was decided to keep a minor team in the VHL structure.

In 2013, Lokomotiv Yaroslavl decided not to allow its team to participate in the VHL for the 2013–14 season. Therefore, Lokomotiv's VHL club was disbanded.
