= HC Oktan Perm =

- City: Perm, Russia
- League: Pervaya Liga
- Founded: 2008

HC Otkan Perm is an ice hockey team in Perm, Russia. They play in the Pervaya Liga, the third level of Russian ice hockey. The club was founded in 2008.
