= Avangard (Saint Petersburg company) =

- Company type: Open Joint-Stock Company
- Founded: 1948
- Headquarters: Saint Petersburg, Russia
- Parent: Concern Radio-Electronic Technologies

Avangard Joint-Stock Company (Russian: ОАО «Авангард») is a company based in Saint Petersburg, Russia. It is part of Concern Radio-Electronic Technologies (Rostec group).

Avangard was the leading enterprise of the Soviet Ministry of the Radio Industry, developing and manufacturing high precision special electronic components for communications systems, satellites, and military rockets. Avangard consists of two research institutes and two production plants which develop and produce components for electronics, processing equipment, and instrumentation for the instrument-making industry.
