= Avangard, Iglinsky District, Bashkortostan =

Avangard Авангард
- Village
- Location within Bashkortostan Location within Russia
- Coordinates: 54°54′N 56°43′E
- Country: Russia
- Region: Bashkortostan
- District: Iglinsky District
- Time zone: UTC+5:00

Avangard (Russian: Авангард) is a rural locality (a village) in Tavtimanovsky Rural Settlement of Iglinsky District, Bashkortostan, Russia. The population was 67 as of 2018. There is 1 street.

== Geography ==
Avangard is located 25 km northeast of Iglino (the district's administrative centre) by road. Klyuchevskoye is the nearest rural locality.
