= HC Rostov =

Professional ice hockey team, Rostov-on-Don, Russia

- City: Rostov-on-Don
- League: VHL
- Founded: 2004
- Home arena: Rostov-on-Don Palace of Sports
- Colours: Red, White
- Head coach: Grigorijs Panteļejevs
- Affiliate: HC Sochi (KHL)
- Website: HC Rostov

Championships
- VHL-B Champions: 2015; 2017; 2019

Hockey Club Rostov (Russian: Хоккейный клуб Ростов), commonly referred to as HC Rostov, are a professional ice hockey team based in Rostov-on-Don, Russia. HC Rostov plays in the OLIMPBET VHL and play at the Rostov-on-Don Palace of Sports.

== History ==
In 2005, a local amateur under the name 'Condors' was established and was immediately successful, winning the Rostov Region Championship in both 2005 and 2006. In 2010 the team joined the Krasnodar League, where they played for two years. In 2013 the club, now operated under the name HC Rostov, turned professional and joined the Russian Hockey League.

During their time in the Russian Hockey League (which was renamed in 2015 to the Supreme Hockey League Championship), HC Rostov were a dominant force, finishing 1st in the regular season rankings 4 years in a row, and winning the VHL-B Championship in 2015, 2017 and 2019. During this period, the only other team to win the Championship was HC Tambov.

The VHL expanded during the 2019 off-season, with 6 new teams joining the league. On 31 May 2019 it was announced that Humo Tashkent, Dynamo Tver, Torpedo-Gorky Nizhny Novgorod and Kazakhstan's Nomad Nur-Sultan would be joining the league. Two months later on 22 July 2019, it was announced that HC Rostov would also be joining the league, along with China's ORG Beijing.

HC Rostov's logo features a Condor in reference to the origins of the club.
