= Alexander Gogolev =

Russian professional ice hockey forward (born 1992)

- Born: May 18, 1992 (age 34) Moscow, Russia
- Height: 5 ft 11 in (180 cm)
- Weight: 172 lb (78 kg; 12 st 4 lb)
- Position: Right Wing
- Shoots: Left
- Played for: HC Spartak Moscow; Severstal Cherepovets
- NHL draft: Undrafted
- Playing career: 2011–present

Alexander Gogolev (born May 18, 1992) is a Russian professional ice hockey forward currently an unrestricted free agent who was most recently contracted to the Reading Royals of the ECHL.

== Playing career ==
Gogolev originally played as a youth in his native Russia, making his professional debut with HC Spartak Moscow in the Kontinental Hockey League during the 2010–11 season. Harboring NHL ambitions, Gogolev moved to North America the following season, to play out his draft eligibility in the major junior Western Hockey League with the Calgary Hitmen and Victoria Royals.

Gogolev was passed over in the 2012 and 2013 NHL entry draft prompting a return to Russia with the Severstal Cherepovets of the KHL for the 2013–14 season.

As a free agent, Gogolev opted to return to North America to play professionally in signing one-year deal with the Reading Royals of the ECHL on September 14, 2016. He was released from his contract with the Royals prior to opening night after failing to make the final roster on October 10, 2016.

== Personal life ==
Gogolev comes from an ice hockey playing family. His father, Dmitri played professional hockey in Russia and his younger brother Pavel plays in the OHL.
