= Konovalenko Sports Palace =

Russian indoor sporting arena

Coordinates: 56.247180°N 43.861564°E

Konovalenko Sports Palace is an indoor sporting arena located in Nizhny Novgorod, Russia. The capacity of the arena is 4,300 and opened in 1967. It was the home arena of the Torpedo Nizhny Novgorod ice hockey team of the Russian Super League until the Trade Union Sport Palace was renovated and expanded in 2007. Today, the arena serves as the training rink of Torpedo Nizhny Novgorod.
