= Dynamo-Altay =

Russian ice hockey team

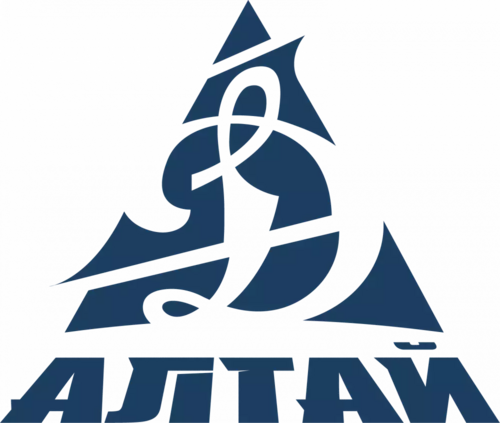
- Nickname: HCDA (рус. ХКДА)
- City: Barnaul, Russia
- League: All-Russian Hockey League
- Founded: 2006
- Home arena: Titov Sports Palace
- Colours
- General manager: Artemi Lakiza
- Head coach: Artyom Sedunov
- Affiliates: HC Sibir Novosibirsk (KHL); Sibirskie Snaipery (MHL)
- Website: https://hcda.ru/

Franchise history
- 1954–1959: Spartak
- 1959–2006: Motor
- 2006–2019: Altay
- 2019–present: Dynamo-Altay

Dynamo-Altay (Russian: Динамо-Алтай) is an ice hockey team in Barnaul, Russia. They play in the All-Russian Hockey League, the second level of ice hockey in Russia. The club was founded in 2006 under the name "Altay" and received its current name in 2019. They competed in Russia's third-tier leagues before joining the VHL in 2023. For their first two seasons in the VHL, they were a farm club of the KHL's Admiral Vladivostok. For the 2025/26 season, they signed a partnership with HC Sibir Novosibirsk.
