= Slavutych Smolensk =

- City: Smolensk, Russia
- League: Belarusian Extraleague
- Founded: 2010
- Colours: Red, White, Black

Slavutych Smolensk is an ice hockey team in Smolensk, Russia. The club was founded in 2010, and plays in the Belarusian Extraleague.

== Honours ==
(gold) Dubko Memorial (2): 2024, 2025
