= All-Russian Hockey League =

Ice hockey league in Eastern Europe

- Sport: Ice hockey
- Founded: 2010
- No. of teams: 33 (2024–2025 season)
- Countries: Russia (33 teams)
- Most recent champion: Yugra Khanty-Mansiysk (2nd title)
- Most titles: Toros Neftekamsk (3)
- Related competitions: Kontinental Hockey League; VHL-B; Junior Hockey League; National Junior Hockey League
- Website: www.vhlru.ru/en/

The All-Russian Hockey League (VHL) (Russian: Всероссийская хоккейная лига (ВХЛ), Vserossiyskaya hokkeinaya liga (VHL)), also known as the Supreme Hockey League, Major Hockey League or Higher Hockey League (HHL) (Russian: Высшая хоккейная лига, Vysshaya hokkeinaya liga), is a professional ice hockey league in Eurasia, and the second highest level of Russian hockey.

As the Kontinental Hockey League, the top tier of Russian ice hockey, is independent from the Ice Hockey Federation of Russia, the VHL's champion is also declared the Champion of Russia.

== History ==
Though currently acting independently, plans were in place to convert it to a farm system for the Kontinental Hockey League (KHL)'s 2010–11 season. It was preceded by the Major League of the Russian Championship (Vysshaya Liga) that formerly held a relegation role for the Russian Superleague and was governed by the Ice Hockey Federation of Russia. As of the 2022–23 season, most VHL teams were affiliated with a KHL team (e.g., Khimik Voskresensk is affiliated with KHL's Spartak Moscow), while some teams of the VHL are not affiliated with a KHL team.

Before the 2022/23 season, the league was renamed from Supreme Hockey League (Russian: Высшая хоккейная лига) to All-Russian Hockey League (Russian: Всероссийская хоккейная лига).

Since the 2024/25 season, when the KHL became independent from the Ice Hockey Federation of Russia, the league's champion is also declared the Champion of Russia.

== Russian Classic ==
The Russian Classic (Russian: Русская классика, Russkaya klassika) is an outdoor ice hockey game that is played during the Supreme Hockey League regular season. So far, the visiting team has won every edition of the game.

Date	Venue	Sport	Location	Home team	Visiting Team	Score	Attendance
February 17, 2012	Central Stadium	Football, Rugby	Krasnoyarsk	Sokol Krasnoyarsk	Lokomotiv Yaroslavl	2–3	16,100
January 19, 2014	Central Stadium	Football	Chelyabinsk	Chelmet Chelyabinsk	Lada Togliatti	2–5	9,200
February 14, 2015	Sputnik Stadium	Football	Nizhny Tagil	Sputnik Nizhny Tagil	Yuzhny Ural Orsk	0–4	8,350
February 7, 2016	Khimik Stadium	Football	Tver	THK Tver	Buran Voronezh	1–2 (OT)	6,350
January 14, 2017	Park Legend		Moscow	Dynamo Balashikha	Khimik Voskresensk	1–3	1,831
January 28, 2018	Central Stadium	Football	Kurgan	Zauralie Kurgan	Rubin Tyumen	0–4	3,000

- **Bolded** teams denote winners

== Seasons overview ==
Season	Petrov Cup winner	Finalist	Final score	Regular season winner
2010–11	(Russia) Rubin Tyumen	(Russia) Neftyanik Almetyevsk	4–0	(Russia) Rubin Tyumen
2011–12	(Russia) Toros Neftekamsk	(Russia) Rubin Tyumen	4–1	(Russia) Rubin Tyumen
2012–13	(Russia) Toros Neftekamsk	(Kazakhstan) Saryarka Karagandy	4–3	(Kazakhstan) Saryarka Karagandy
2013–14	(Kazakhstan) Saryarka Karagandy	(Russia) Rubin Tyumen	4–2	(Russia) Toros Neftekamsk
2014–15	(Russia) Toros Neftekamsk	(Russia) Izhstal Izhevsk	4–2	(Kazakhstan) Saryarka Karagandy
2015–16	(Russia) Neftyanik Almetyevsk	(Russia) Izhstal Izhevsk	4–1	(Russia) THK Tver
2016–17	(Russia) Dynamo Balashikha	(Kazakhstan) Torpedo Ust-Kamenogorsk	4–0	(Kazakhstan) Torpedo Ust-Kamenogorsk
2017–18	(Russia) Dinamo Saint Petersburg	(Russia) SKA-Neva Saint Petersburg	4–2	(Russia) Dinamo Saint Petersburg
2018–19	(Kazakhstan) Saryarka Karagandy	(Russia) Rubin Tyumen	4–1	(Russia) SKA-Neva Saint Petersburg
2019–20	Cancelled due to the COVID-19 pandemic			(Russia) Zvezda Moscow
2020–21	(Russia) Yugra Khanty-Mansiysk	(Russia) Metallurg Novokuznetsk	4–1	(Russia) Yugra Khanty-Mansiysk
2021–22	(Russia) Rubin Tyumen	(Russia) Dinamo Saint Petersburg	4–1	(Russia) Yugra Khanty-Mansiysk
2022–23	(Russia) Khimik Voskresensk	(Russia) Sokol Krasnoyarsk	4–0	(Russia) Yugra Khanty-Mansiysk
2023–24	(Russia) Neftyanik Almetyevsk	(Russia) AKM Tula	4–0	(Russia) Molot-Prikamye Perm
2024–25	(Russia) Torpedo-Gorky	(Russia) Khimik Voskresensk	4–2	(Russia) Metallurg Novokuznetsk
2025–26	(Russia) Yugra Khanty-Mansiysk	(Russia) Khimik Voskresensk	4–1	(Russia) Metallurg Novokuznetsk

== Teams in 2025–26 ==
Team	City	Arena	Capacity	KHL Affiliate Team(s)	MHL/NMHL Affiliate Team(s)	Founded	Joined league
1 AKM	(Russia) Tula	Ice Palace	3,363	Independent	Akademiya Mikhailova; AKM-Junior	2021	2021
2 Bars	(Russia) Kazan	Sports Palace Kazan	3,845	Ak Bars Kazan	Irbis	2009	2014
3 Buran	(Russia) Voronezh	LDS Jubileiny	3,200	Severstal Cherepovets	EcoNiva Bobrov; HC Proton	1949	2012
4 CSK VVS Samara	(Russia) Samara	Vladimir Vysotsky Sport Palace	5,000	Lada Togliatti	None	1950	2023
5 Chelmet	(Russia) Chelyabinsk	Yunost Sport Palace	3,500	Traktor Chelyabinsk	Belye Medvedi	1948	2010
6 Chelny	(Russia) Naberezhnye Chelny	Ice Sports Palace	1,500	Admiral Vladivostok	None	1970	2023
7 Dizel	(Russia) Penza	Dizel Arena	5,500	Severstal Cherepovets	Dizelist Penza	1956	2010
8 Dynamo Saint Petersburg	(Russia) Saint Petersburg	Yubileyny Sports Palace	7,000	Dynamo Moscow	JHC Dinamo Saint Petersburg	2013	2016
9 Dynamo-Altai	(Russia) Barnaul	Titov Arena	4,281	Sibir Novosibirsk	None	1954	2023
10 Gornyak-UGMK	(Russia) Verkhnyaya Pyshma	Alexei Kozitsyn Ice Arena	1,500	Avtomobilist Yekaterinburg	Avto	2013	2017
11 HC Norilsk	(Russia) Norilsk	Arktika Sport Palace	2,184	Independent	None	2023	2023
12 HC Tambov	(Russia) Tambov	Kristall Ice Palace	1,500	Independent	JHC Tambov	1981	2018
13 HC Izhstal	(Russia) Izhevsk	Sports Palace Izhstal	3,268	Neftekhimik Nizhnekamsk	Progress	1958	2010
14 Khimik	(Russia) Voskresensk	Podmoskovie Ice Palace	4,000	Spartak Moscow	JHC Spartak	2005	2015
15 Kristall Saratov	(Russia) Saratov	Kristall Ice Sport Palace	5,141	Independent	JHC Kristall	1947	2010
16 HC Magnitka Magnitogorsk	(Russia) Magnitogorsk	Ice Sport Palace	330	Metallurg Magnitogorsk	Stalnye Lisy	2024	2024
17 Metallurg Novokuznetsk	(Russia) Novokuznetsk	Kuznetsk Metallurgists Sports Palace	7,533	Independent	Kuznetskie Medvedi	1949	2017
18 Molot	(Russia) Perm	Universal Sports Palace Molot	6,000	Lokomotiv Yaroslavl	MHC Molot	1948	2010
19 Neftyanik	(Russia) Almetyevsk	Yubileyny Sports Palace	2,000	Ak Bars Kazan	Sputnik Almetyevsk	1965	2010
20 Olimpiya Kirovo-Chepetsk	(Russia) Kirovo-Chepetsk	Olimp-Arena	1,793	Independent	None	1954	2024
21 Omskie Krylya	(Russia) Omsk	Avangard Hockey Academy	1,200	Avangard Omsk	Omskie Yastreby	2021	2021
22 HC Rostov	(Russia) Rostov-on-Don	Ice Arena	600	HC Sochi	None	2004	2019
23 Rubin	(Russia) Tyumen	Sports Palace Tyumen	3,300	Independent	Tyumensky Legion	1959	2010
24 Ryazan-VDV	(Russia) Ryazan	Ryazan Olympic Sports Palace	3,000	Independent	JHC Ryazan-VDV Kapitan Stupino	1999	2010
25 SKA-VMF	(Russia) Saint Petersburg	Hockey City Sport Complex	1,418	SKA Saint Petersburg	SKA-1946; SKA Academy	2008	2010
26 Sokol	(Russia) Krasnoyarsk	Arena Sever	2,600	Independent	Krasnoyarskie Rysi	1977	2011
27 Toros	(Russia) Neftekamsk	Ice Palace Neftekamsk	1,900	Salavat Yulaev Ufa	Tolpar	1988	2010
28 Torpedo-Gorky	(Russia) Nizhny Novgorod	Konovalenko Sports Palace	4,300	Torpedo Nizhny Novgorod	Chaika	2019	2019
29 Yugra Khanty-Mansiysk	(Russia) Khanty-Mansiysk	Arena Ugra	5,500	Independent	Mamonty Yugry	2006	2018
30 Yuzhny Ural	(Russia) Orsk	Ice Palace Yubileyny	4,500	Independent	Sarmaty	1958	2010
31 Zauralie	(Russia) Kurgan	Ice Sports Palace Mostovik	2,500	Independent	Fakel-Yamal	1962	2010
32 Zvezda Moscow	(Russia) Moscow	CSKA Ice Palace	5,600	CSKA Moscow	Krasnaya Armiya	2015	2015

=== All-time team records ===
Since its foundation in 2010, 40 different clubs have played in the VHL, and 34 of them have at least once qualified for the playoffs. Only one club (Toros Neftekamsk) has made the playoffs in all nine championships of the VHL, reaching the semi-final stage six times. The table gives the final regular season ranks for all teams, with the playoff performance encoded in colors. The teams are ordered by their best championship results.

Club	2011	2012	2013	2014	2015	2016	2017	2018	2019	2020
Toros Neftekamsk	2	2	3	1	8	3	5	10	3	
Rubin Tyumen	1	1	2	3	11	19	10	17	4	
Saryarka Karagandy			1	4	1	8	3	4	10	
Neftyanik Almetyevsk	3	7	4	10	19	4	11	3	2	
Dynamo Balashikha	19	20	11	13	17	12	6			
Dinamo Saint Petersburg							12	1	14	
HC Izhstal	16	19	26	19	2	10	16	21	26	
Torpedo Ust-Kamenogorsk	9	8	14	11	15	9	1	7	18	
SKA-Neva	11	11	18	25	21	7	2	2	1	
Dizel Penza	7	5	16	6	10	20	19	19	21	
THK Tver			19	8	3	1	7			
Molot-Prikamye Perm	4	12	13	2	4	15	17	16	27	
Buran Voronezh			7	9	7	5	25	25	22	
Zauralie Kurgan	10	16	25	26	9	11	8	5	8	
Ariada Volzhsk	18	9	12	14	20	22	24			
Donbass Donetsk		3								
Ermak Angarsk	8	6	8	17	12	6	13	6	28	
Sputnik Nizhny Tagil	12	14	6	24	13	14	4	26		
Lokomotiv Yaroslavl		22	10							
Ryazan	15	21	27	21	6	2	15	22	13	
Lada Togliatti	20	13	9	12					5	
Yuzhny Ural	6	4	5	7	18	17	21	11	16	
Zvezda Moscow						21	14	12	6	
Chelmet Chelyabinsk	13	10	20	18	16	16	18	20	20	
Sokol Krasnoyarsk		18	24	16	22	18	9	8	12	
Kuban			17	5	14					
Kristall Saratov	17	23	21	22		25	26			
Metallurg Novokuznetsk								13	11	
Sarov	5	17	15	20	23	13	20	9	25	
Titan Klin		15	22	15						
Lipetsk				23	5					
Krylya Sovetov	14									
Khimik Voskresensk						24	23	15	9	
Tsen Tou								14	15	
Yugra Khanty-Mansiysk									7	
Bars					24	23	22	18	17	
CSK VVS Samara								27	19	
Gornyak Uchaly								23	24	
HC Tambov									23	
KRS-ORG Beijing								24	29	
Yunost Minsk			23							
Zvezda-VDV Dmitrov						26				
Dynamo Tver										
Humo										
Nomad										
ORG										
HC Rostov										
Torpedo-Gorky										

Color	Result
Red	Bratina Cup Winner
Yellow	Runner-up
Green	Semifinalist
Light Blue	Quarterfinalist
Blue	Qualified for playoffs
Light Gray	Not qualified for playoffs
Gray	Did not play in the season

== See also ==
- Kontinental Hockey League
- VHL-B
- Junior Hockey League
- National Junior Hockey League
