= HC Tambov =

- City: Tambov, Russia
- League: Supreme Hockey League
- Conference: Conference 1
- Division: Division B
- Founded: 1981
- Home arena: Crystal Ice Palace
- Colours: White, Black, Orange, Gray
- Website: Official site

HC Tambov is an ice hockey team in Tambov, Russia. They were founded in 1981, and play in the Supreme Hockey League, the second level of ice hockey in Russia.
