= 2013–14 Admiral Vladivostok season =

KHL hockey team season

The 2013–14 Admiral Vladivostok season was the ice hockey team's first season of play in the Kontinental Hockey League (KHL).

Based in Vladivostok, Russia, the team was member of the KHL, and was one of only two teams located in the Russian Far East, along with Amur Khabarovsk.

== Logo ==
Admiral's name and logo were determined by the public. Located in the Maritime Province, its logo features a white anchor supported by hockey sticks and a ship's wheel, over-top a diagonally striped black and orange shield. The coat of arms is topped with a red star.

== Standings ==
=== Divisional standings ===
	Chernyshev Division	GP	W	OTW	SOW	SOL	OTL	L	GF	GA	Pts
1	(Kazakhstan) Barys Astana	54	26	2	4	2	2	18	182	157	94
2	(Russia) Salavat Yulaev Ufa	54	25	3	3	4	3	16	155	140	94
3	(Russia) Sibir Novosibirsk	54	22	2	5	6	1	18	125	117	87
4	(Russia) Admiral Vladivostok	54	21	1	4	4	1	23	135	129	78
5	(Russia) Avangard Omsk	54	17	1	5	4	2	25	136	162	69
6	(Russia) Metallurg Novokuznetsk	54	12	1	1	4	6	30	115	170	50
7	(Russia) Amur Khabarovsk	54	8	1	4	10	1	30	106	182	45

=== Conference standings ===
	Eastern Conference	Div	GP	W	OTW	SOW	SOL	OTL	L	GF	GA	Pts
1	Z – Metallurg Magnitogorsk	KHA	54	30	3	2	6	2	11	166	113	108
2	Y – Barys Astana	CHE	54	26	2	4	2	2	18	182	157	94
3	Ak Bars Kazan	KHA	54	26	4	4	5	1	14	139	108	100
4	Salavat Yulaev Ufa	CHE	54	25	3	3	4	3	16	155	140	94
4	Torpedo Nizhny Novgorod	KHA	54	25	2	5	3	2	17	153	121	94
6	Sibir Novosibirsk	CHE	54	22	2	5	6	1	18	125	117	87
7	Avtomobilist Yekaterinburg	KHA	54	22	0	7	5	1	19	134	125	86
8	Admiral Vladivostok	CHE	54	21	1	4	4	1	23	135	129	78
9	Traktor Chelyabinsk	KHA	54	18	1	6	5	2	22	126	148	75
10	Avangard Omsk	CHE	54	17	1	5	4	2	25	136	162	69
11	Yugra Khanty-Mansiysk	KHA	54	16	1	3	2	6	26	128	166	64
12	Neftekhimik Nizhnekamsk	KHA	54	15	2	2	3	1	31	127	152	57
13	Metallurg Novokuznetsk	CHE	54	12	1	1	4	6	30	115	170	50
14	Amur Khabarovsk	CHE	54	8	1	4	10	1	30	106	182	45

Y – Clinched Division;
Z – Clinched Conference
KHA – Kharlamov Division,
CHE – Chernyshev Division

== 2013 KHL Expansion Draft ==
Admiral filled its inaugural squad on June 17, 2013, in the 2013 KHL Expansion Draft. The players selected in the extension draft are:

#	Player	Position	Age	Drafted from
1.	(Russia) Evgeny Ivannikov	G	22	SKA Saint Petersburg
2.	(Russia) Artyom Zemchyonok	D	21	Spartak Moscow
3.	(Russia) Anton Poleschuk	D	26	Amur Khabarovsk
4.	(Russia) Denis Osipov	D	26	Yugra
5.	(Russia) Dmitri Kostromitin	D	23	Traktor Chelyabinsk
6.	(Belarus) Alexei Ugarov	LW	28	Torpedo Nizhny Novgorod
7.	(Russia) Enver Lisin	RW	27	Metallurg Magnitogorsk
8.	(Russia) Alexei Yefimov	F	25	Avtomobilist Yekaterinburg
9.	(Russia) Andrei Nikitenko	C	34	Metallurg Novokuznetsk
10.	(Russia) Konstantin Sokolov	F	22	Ak Bars Kazan
11.	(Russia) Sergei Lesnukhin	F	26	HC Vityaz
12.	(Russia) Viktor Drugov	LW	27	Sibir Novosibirsk
13.	(Russia) Aleksandr Kuznetsov	C	21	Atlant
14.	(Sweden) Niclas Bergfors	LW	26	Severstal Cherepovets
15.	(Russia) Igor Bortnikov	F	24	Neftekhimik Nizhnekamsk
16.	(Sweden) Richard Gynge	RW	26	HC Dynamo Moscow
17.	(Russia) Sergei Barbashev	LW	20	CSKA Moscow
18.	(Russia) Vladimir Pervushin	F	27	Avangard Omsk
19.	(Russia) Danil Gareyev	F	21	Salavat Yulaev Ufa
20.	(Germany) Felix Schütz	C	25	Kölner Haie
