= 2013 KHL expansion draft =

Selection of players to stock a new team

General information
- Date(s): 17 June 2013

Overview
- Expansion teams: Admiral Vladivostok
- Expansion season: 2013–14

The 2013 KHL expansion draft was held on 17 June 2013 in order to fill the roster of the league's expansion team Admiral Vladivostok for the 2013-14 season.

== Rules ==
Admiral Vladivostok was able to select players from any of the Russian-based teams in the KHL, except from Lokomotiv Yaroslavl. This exception was because Lokomotiv had been still recovering from the 2011 Lokomotiv Yaroslavl plane crash.

Five days before the draft, each team submitted five players to be available for selection in the expansion draft and the Vladivostok team was allowed to choose one player from each club. The players submitted for selection might have been either Russian or foreign. However, the Vladivostok roster had to contain no more than seven foreign players and no more than one foreign goaltender.

The players submitted to the draft had to meet the following criteria:

- Players must be born in 1992 or earlier and have an existing contract with KHL clubs and a first team experience
- Players who have received offers of a trial period or a contract from clubs
- Their contracts do not contain a clause prohibiting an exchange with another club
- Players whose contractual status is not In Conflict, Secured Rights or Reserved Player

The players names available for Admiral to choose from were not revealed to public due to ethical issues and league agreements with the various teams.

== Draft picks ==
Below are all players drafted to Admiral in the expansion draft:

#	Player	Position	Age	Drafted from
1.	(Russia) Evgeny Ivannikov	G	22	SKA Saint Petersburg
2.	(Russia) Artyom Zemchyonok	D	21	Spartak Moscow
3.	(Russia) Anton Poleschuk	D	26	Amur Khabarovsk
4.	(Russia) Denis Osipov	D	26	Yugra
5.	(Russia) Dmitri Kostromitin	D	23	Traktor Chelyabinsk
6.	(Belarus) Alexei Ugarov	LW	28	Torpedo Nizhny Novgorod
7.	(Russia) Enver Lisin	RW	27	Metallurg Magnitogorsk
8.	(Russia) Alexei Yefimov	F	25	Avtomobilist Yekaterinburg
9.	(Russia) Andrei Nikitenko	C	34	Metallurg Novokuznetsk
10.	(Russia) Konstantin Sokolov	F	22	Ak Bars Kazan
11.	(Russia) Sergei Lesnukhin	F	26	HC Vityaz
12.	(Russia) Viktor Drugov	LW	27	Sibir Novosibirsk
13.	(Russia) Viktor Drugov	C	21	Atlant
14.	(Sweden) Niclas Bergfors	LW	26	Severstal Cherepovets
15.	(Russia) Igor Bortnikov	F	24	Neftekhimik Nizhnekamsk
16.	(Sweden) Richard Gynge	RW	26	HC Dynamo Moscow
17.	(Russia) Sergei Barbashev	LW	20	CSKA Moscow
18.	(Russia) Vladimir Pervushin	F	27	Avangard Omsk
19.	(Russia) Danil Gareyev	F	21	Salavat Yulaev Ufa
