= Drugov =

Drugov, feminine: Drugova is a Russian surname. Notable people with the surname include:

- Aleksey Drugov (born 1937) Soviet and Russian orientalist, expert in Indonesia
- Vasily Drugov (1923–2011) Soviet state security lieutenant general
- Viktor Drugov, Russian professional ice hockey player
- Yuri Drugov (1897–1973), Soviet major general of the medical service
