= Aleksandr Osipov =

Aleksandr Osipov may refer to:

- Aleksandr Osipov (footballer) (born 1998), Russian football player
- Aleksandr Osipov (ice hockey) (born 1989), Russian ice hockey player
- Aleksandr Osipov (politician) (born 1969), Russian politician

== See also ==
- Aleksandr Osipovich (born 1977), Belarusian former professional footballer
