= Ivannikov =

Ivannikov is a Russian surname. Notable people with the surname include:

- Aleksandr Ivannikov (born 1945), Russian ski jumper
- Evgeny Ivannikov (born 1991), Russian ice hockey player
- Nikolai Ivannikov (born 1992), Russian footballer
- Valery Ivannikov (born 1976), Russian ice hockey player
- Viktor Ivannikov (1940–2016), Russian computer scientist
