= Chernikov =

Chernikov (masculine, Russian: Черников) or Chernikova (feminine, Russian: Черникова) is a Russian surname. Notable people with the surname include:

- Alexander Chernikov (born 1984), Russian ice hockey player
- Sergei Chernikov (1912–1987), Russian mathematician
- Valentin Chernikov (1937–2002), Soviet fencer
- Yakov Chernikhov (1889–1951), Soviet architect and graphic designer
