= Artyom Zemchyonok =

Russian ice hockey player (born 1991)

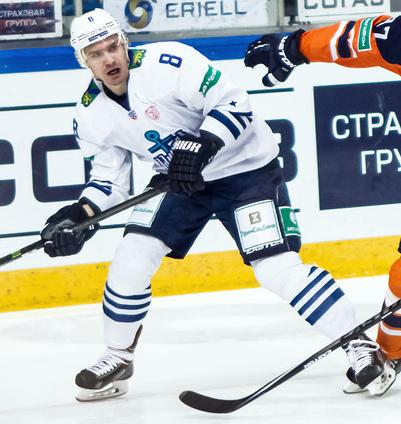
- Born: June 24, 1991 (age 35) Moscow, Russian SFSR, Soviet Union
- Height: 6 ft 0 in (183 cm)
- Weight: 187 lb (85 kg; 13 st 5 lb)
- Position: Defence
- Shoots: Right
- KHL team Former teams: Free agent Spartak Moscow; Admiral Vladivostok; SKA Saint Petersburg; Metallurg Magnitogorsk; Lada Togliatti
- NHL draft: Undrafted
- Playing career: 2011–present

Artyom Zemchyonok (Russian: Артём Земчёнок; born June 24, 1991) is a Russian professional ice hockey defenceman. He is currently an unrestricted free agent, who most recently played with HC Lada Togliatti of the Kontinental Hockey League (KHL).

== Playing career ==
Zemchyonok started his career in HC Spartak Moscow's academy. He reached the 2013 Kharlamov Cup final with JHC Spartak where they were defeated by Avangard Omsk's junior team Omskie Yastreby in Game 7 overtime. He was also selected for the Youth Hockey League's all-star game in 2012 and 2013 and made his Kontinental Hockey League debut for Spartak during the 2011–12 season.

Before the 2013–14 season, Zemchyonok was picked by Admiral Vladivostok in the 2013 KHL expansion draft.

After concluding the 2017–18 season, his 5th with Admiral, Zemchyonok left as a free agent to sign a one-year contract with SKA Saint Petersburg, on 4 July 2018. In 2018, he won the Deutschland Cup and the Lucerne Cup with the Russian national team. In January 2019, Zemchyonok suffered an injury that took him out for the rest of the season. In the 2019 offseason, he signed another one-year contract with SKA.

Zemchyonok played two seasons with SKA, before leaving as a free agent to sign a one-year contract with his fourth KHL club, Metallurg Magnitogorsk, on 4 May 2020. He then signed a two-year extension with Metallurg. In the 2021–22 season, he reached the Gagarin Cup final with Metallurg where they were defeated by HC CSKA Moscow in seven games.

After three seasons with Metallurg, Zemchyonok returned to SKA Saint Petersburg as a free agent, agreeing to a three-year contract commencing from the 2023–24 season on 3 May 2023. In 2023, he won the Channel One Cup with Russia.

In 2024, Zemchyonok missed several months of the 2024-25 KHL season due to an injury.

Before the 2025–26 season, SKA traded Zemchyonok to HC Lada Togliatti on 25 July 2025.

== Personal life ==
Artyom Zemchyonok married his wife, Karina Zemchyonok, in June 2022.

== Career statistics ==
			Regular season					Playoffs
Season	Team	League	GP	G	A	Pts	PIM	GP	G	A	Pts	PIM
2009–10	JHC Spartak	MHL	62	4	12	16	71	—	—	—	—	—
2010–11	JHC Spartak	MHL	49	3	11	14	86	—	—	—	—	—
2011–12	JHC Spartak	MHL	55	1	12	13	20	5	0	0	0	2
2011–12	Spartak Moscow	KHL	1	0	0	0	0	—	—	—	—	—
2012–13	JHC Spartak	MHL	48	5	16	21	16	15	0	1	1	6
2013–14	Admiral Vladivostok	KHL	53	1	5	6	8	5	0	0	0	0
2014–15	Admiral Vladivostok	KHL	56	4	10	14	20	—	—	—	—	—
2015–16	Admiral Vladivostok	KHL	46	2	9	11	14	5	0	0	0	2
2016–17	Admiral Vladivostok	KHL	50	4	11	15	20	6	1	2	3	4
2017–18	Admiral Vladivostok	KHL	30	1	7	8	4	—	—	—	—	—
2018–19	SKA Saint Petersburg	KHL	28	2	3	5	10	—	—	—	—	—
2018–19	SKA-Neva	VHL	1	0	0	0	2	—	—	—	—	—
2019–20	SKA Saint Petersburg	KHL	34	0	5	5	8	—	—	—	—	—
2020–21	Metallurg Magnitogorsk	KHL	48	3	9	12	14	10	0	3	3	0
2021–22	Metallurg Magnitogorsk	KHL	41	2	15	17	18	22	2	4	6	4
2022–23	Metallurg Magnitogorsk	KHL	57	0	7	7	11	10	0	0	0	4
2023–24	SKA Saint Petersburg	KHL	52	4	13	17	14	8	0	2	2	4
2024–25	SKA Saint Petersburg	KHL	28	0	5	5	16	2	0	0	0	0
2025–26	Lada Togliatti	KHL	58	2	8	10	14	—	—	—	—	—
KHL totals			582	25	107	132	178	68	3	11	14	18
