= Lugin =

Lugin or Luhin (Russian: Лугин. from луг meaning meadow) is a Russian masculine surname, its feminine counterpart is Lugina or Luhina. It may refer to

- Alejandro Pérez Lugín (1870–1926), Spanish writer and film director
- Andrey Luhin (born 1959), Belarusian rower
- Dmitri Lugin (born 1990), Russian ice hockey winger
- Olga Lugina (born 1974), Ukrainian tennis player
