= Pervushin =

Pervushin (Russian: Первушин) is a Russian masculine surname, its feminine counterpart is Pervushina. It may refer to:

- Denis Pervushin (born 1977), Russian football player
- Fyodor Pervushin (born 1994), Russian football forward
- Irina Pervushina (born 1942), Russian artistic gymnast
- Ivan Pervushin (1827–1900), Russian mathematician
- Pavel Pervushin (1947–2022), Russian weightlifter
- Sergei Pervushin (born 1970), Russian football player
- Vladimir Pervushin (born 1986), Russian ice hockey forward
- Olesya Pervushina (born 2000), Russian junior tennis player
