= Alexander Chernikov =

Russian ice hockey player (born 1984)

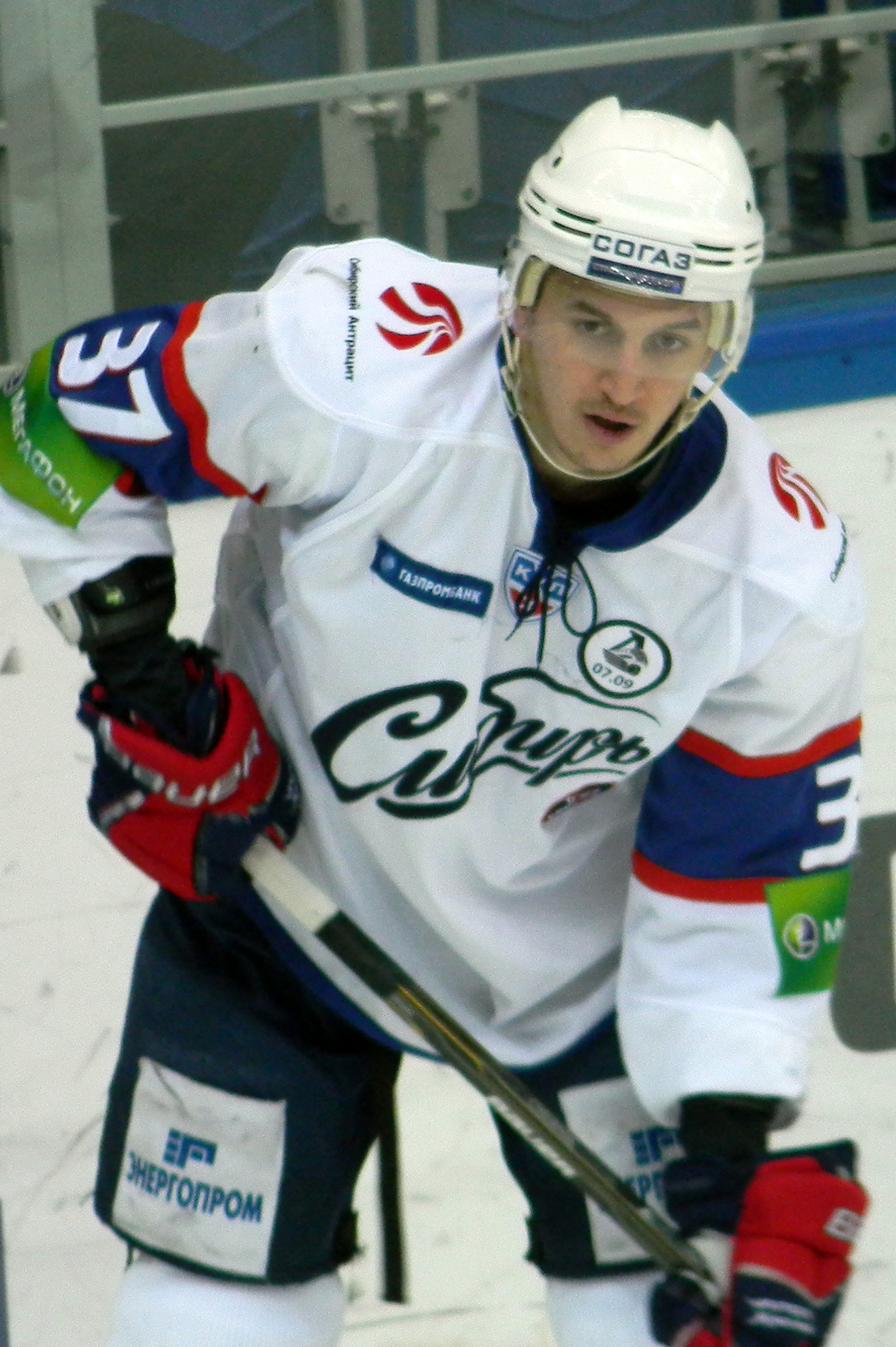
- Born: September 8, 1984 (age 40); Tolyatti, Russia
- Height: 5 ft 11 in (180 cm)
- Weight: 190 lb (86 kg; 13 st 8 lb)
- Position: Forward
- Shoots: Left
- KHL team Former teams: Free Agent; Traktor Chelyabinsk; HC Sibir Novosibirsk; Lokomotiv Yaroslavl; Lada Togliatti; Avangard Omsk; Admiral Vladivostok; Neftekhimik Nizhnekamsk
- Playing career: 2002–present

Alexander Chernikov (born September 8, 1984) is a former Russian professional ice hockey forward.

After two seasons with Lokomotiv Yaroslavl, Chernikov opted to return to hometown club, HC Lada Togliatti on a one-year contract for the 2014–15 season on August 20, 2014.

As a free agent from Traktor Chelyabinsk following the 2017–18 season, Chernikov agreed to a one-year deal with Admiral Vladivostok on July 13, 2018.
