= Libor Šulák =

Czech ice hockey player (born 1994)

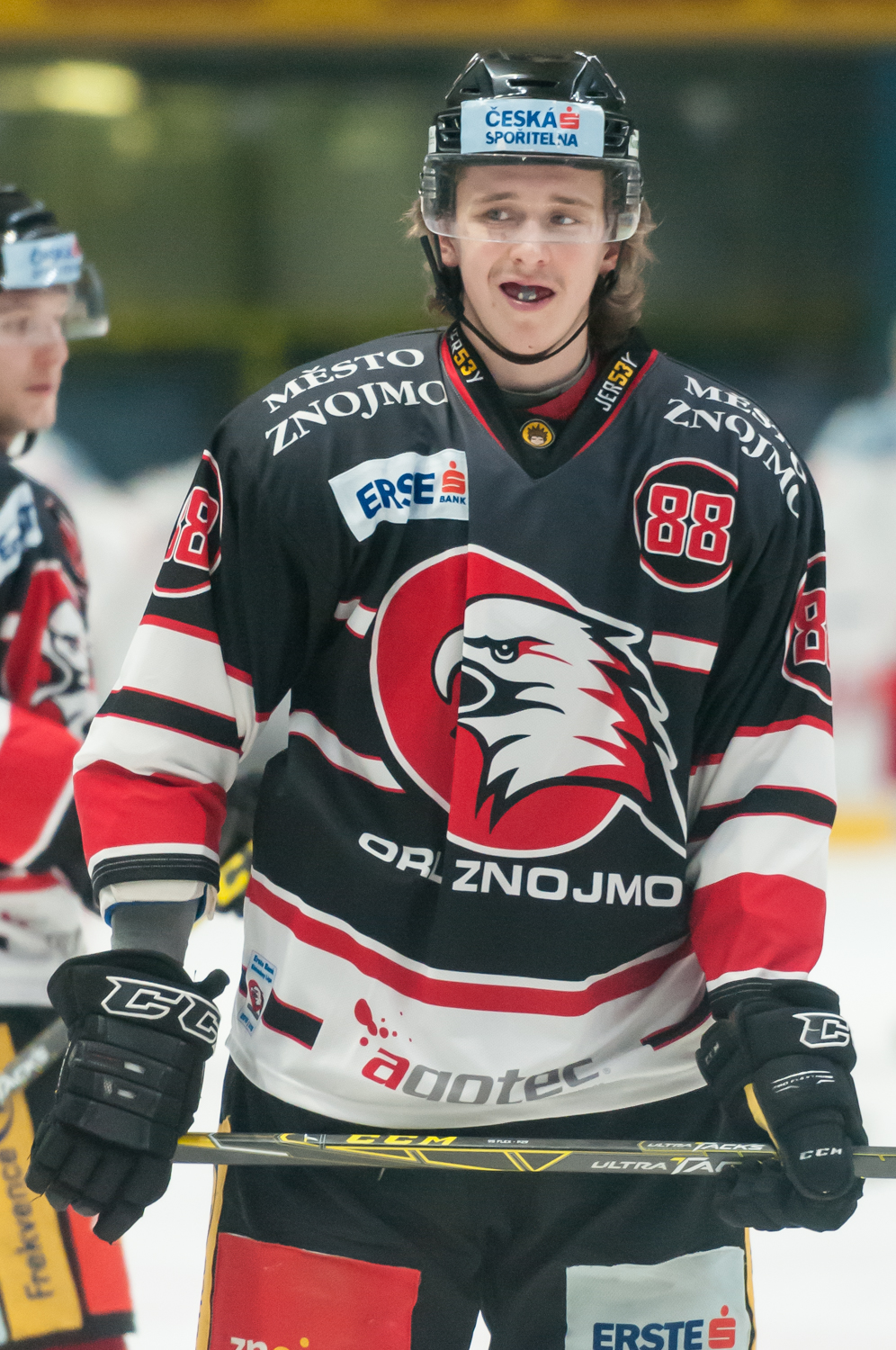
- Šulák in 2015
- Born: 4 March 1994 (age 32) Pelhřimov, Czech Republic
- Height: 6 ft 2 in (188 cm)
- Weight: 207 lb (94 kg; 14 st 11 lb)
- Position: Defence
- Shoots: Left
- KHL team Former teams: Admiral Vladivostok; Piráti Chomutov; Orli Znojmo; Lahti Pelicans; Detroit Red Wings; Severstal Cherepovets; KooKoo; Oulun Kärpät; Örebro HK; Avangard Omsk
- National team: Czech Republic
- NHL draft: Undrafted
- Playing career: 2013–present

Libor Šulák (born 4 March 1994) is a Czech professional ice hockey defenceman currently playing for Admiral Vladivostok of the Kontinental Hockey League (KHL). He has formerly played in the National Hockey League (NHL) with the Detroit Red Wings.

== Playing career ==
Šulák made his Czech Extraliga debut playing with Piráti Chomutov during the 2013–14 season.

During the 2015–16 season playing with Orli Znojmo, Šulák recorded six goals and 12 assists in 52 games and was named the league's rookie of the year. In the following 2016–17 season with Orli Znojmo, Šulák placed fourth on the team with 10 goals and 18 assists and a team-best plus-19 rating in 54 games.

After two productive years with Znojmo, Šulák was initially signed to a two-year contract with Finnish club, Lahti Pelicans of the Liiga on 13 April 2017. However, on 24 May 2017, Šulák was mutually released from his contract using an NHL out-clause in signing to a two-year, entry-level contract with the Detroit Red Wings.

Šulák competed in the ensuing Red Wings training camp and pre-season in preparation for the 2017–18 season. On 2 October 2017, Šulák was reassigned on loan to Finland by the Red Wings, joining his previously arranged club, the Lahti Pelicans. During the 2017–18 season, he recorded nine goals and 23 assists. He led all defensemen in scoring with a career-high 32 points. After the completion of the Liiga season, Šulák was reassigned to the Red Wings AHL affiliate, the Grand Rapids Griffins, on 23 March 2018.

Šulák made his NHL debut with the Detroit Red Wings to open the 2018–19 season on 4 October 2018. He was scoreless in the Red Wings first six games of the season before he was reassigned to the Griffins of the AHL on 16 October 2019. Šulák remained in the AHL for the remainder of the year, posting five goals and 14 points in 61 regular season games.

As an impending restricted free agent to the Red Wings, Šulák opted to return to Europe and continue his career in the KHL, securing a contract with Russian club, Severstal Cherepovets, on 4 June 2019. In the 2019–20 season, Šulák struggled to adapt with Severstal contributing just 2 points in 19 games from the blueline. On 24 November 2019, Šulák was released from his contract and signed for the remainder of the season in returning to the Finnish Liiga with KooKoo.

After an impressive 2021–22 season, captaining Admiral Vladivostok of the KHL and posting eight goals and 26 points in 49 regular season games, Šulák was signed to a one-year extension on 19 January 2022. With Vladivostok out of playoff contention, Šulák extended his season by moving to the SHL and signing for the remainder of the campaign with Örebro HK on 15 February 2022.

== International play ==
Šulák represented the Czech Republic at the 2012 IIHF World U18 Championships, where he recorded three assists in six games. Šulák represented Czech Republic at the 2014 World Junior Ice Hockey Championships, where he recorded no points in five games.

Šulák represented the Czech Republic at the 2017 IIHF World Championship, where he recorded one assist in two games.

== Career statistics ==
=== Regular season and playoffs ===
			Regular season					Playoffs
Season	Team	League	GP	G	A	Pts	PIM	GP	G	A	Pts	PIM
2009–10	HC Rebel Havlíčkův Brod	CZE U16	29	2	4	6	47	—	—	—	—	—
2009–10	HC Rebel Havlíčkův Brod	CZE U18	16	0	0	0	8	—	—	—	—	—
2010–11	HC Rebel Havlíčkův Brod	CZE U18	40	4	7	11	34	3	0	2	2	4
2010–11	HC Rebel Havlíčkův Brod	CZE U20	9	0	0	0	2	—	—	—	—	—
2011–12	Tatranskí Vlci	MHL	50	6	5	11	73	—	—	—	—	—
2012–13	Piráti Chomutov	CZE U20	40	9	9	18	12	3	1	0	1	0
2012–13	SK Kadaň	Czech.1	—	—	—	—	—	2	0	0	0	2
2013–14	Piráti Chomutov	CZE U20	19	4	6	10	28	11	8	1	9	10
2013–14	Piráti Chomutov	ELH	32	2	2	4	14	—	—	—	—	—
2013–14	SK Kadaň	Czech.1	1	0	0	0	0	—	—	—	—	—
2014–15	Piráti Chomutov	CZE U20	12	6	5	11	8	—	—	—	—	—
2014–15	Piráti Chomutov	Czech.1	29	1	5	6	12	10	2	2	4	2
2014–15	SK Kadaň	Czech.1	9	2	3	5	10	—	—	—	—	—
2015–16	Orli Znojmo	EBEL	52	6	12	18	14	18	2	4	6	16
2016–17	Orli Znojmo	EBEL	54	10	18	28	41	4	3	0	3	2
2017–18	Pelicans	Liiga	42	9	23	32	66	3	0	0	0	4
2017–18	Grand Rapids Griffins	AHL	2	0	2	2	0	—	—	—	—	—
2018–19	Detroit Red Wings	NHL	6	0	0	0	6	—	—	—	—	—
2018–19	Grand Rapids Griffins	AHL	61	5	9	14	42	4	0	2	2	4
2019–20	Severstal Cherepovets	KHL	19	1	1	2	14	—	—	—	—	—
2019–20	KooKoo	Liiga	31	7	9	16	30	—	—	—	—	—
2020–21	Kärpät	Liiga	45	8	6	14	92	5	2	0	2	2
2021–22	Admiral Vladivostok	KHL	49	8	18	26	26	—	—	—	—	—
2021–22	Örebro HK	SHL	11	3	4	7	8	8	0	5	5	4
2022–23	Admiral Vladivostok	KHL	67	13	27	40	50	12	2	0	2	12
2023–24	Avangard Omsk	KHL	31	4	8	12	10	—	—	—	—	—
2023–24	Admiral Vladivostok	KHL	28	5	4	9	23	—	—	—	—	—
2024–25	Admiral Vladivostok	KHL	67	9	26	35	40	6	2	3	5	8
2025–26	Admiral Vladivostok	KHL	68	14	29	43	32	—	—	—	—	—
Liiga totals			118	24	38	62	188	8	2	0	2	6
NHL totals			6	0	0	0	6	—	—	—	—	—
KHL totals			329	54	113	167	195	18	4	3	7	20

=== International ===
Year	Team	Event	Result	GP	G	A	Pts	PIM
2012	Czech Republic	WJC18	8th	6	0	3	3	4
2014	Czech Republic	WJC	6th	5	0	0	0	4
2017	Czech Republic	WC	7th	2	0	1	1	0
2018	Czech Republic	WC	7th	8	1	2	3	8
2021	Czech Republic	WC	7th	8	3	1	4	6
2022	Czech Republic	OG	9th	4	1	1	2	2
Junior totals				11	0	3	3	8
Senior totals				22	5	5	10	16
