= Michael Garnett =

Canadian ice hockey player (born 1982)

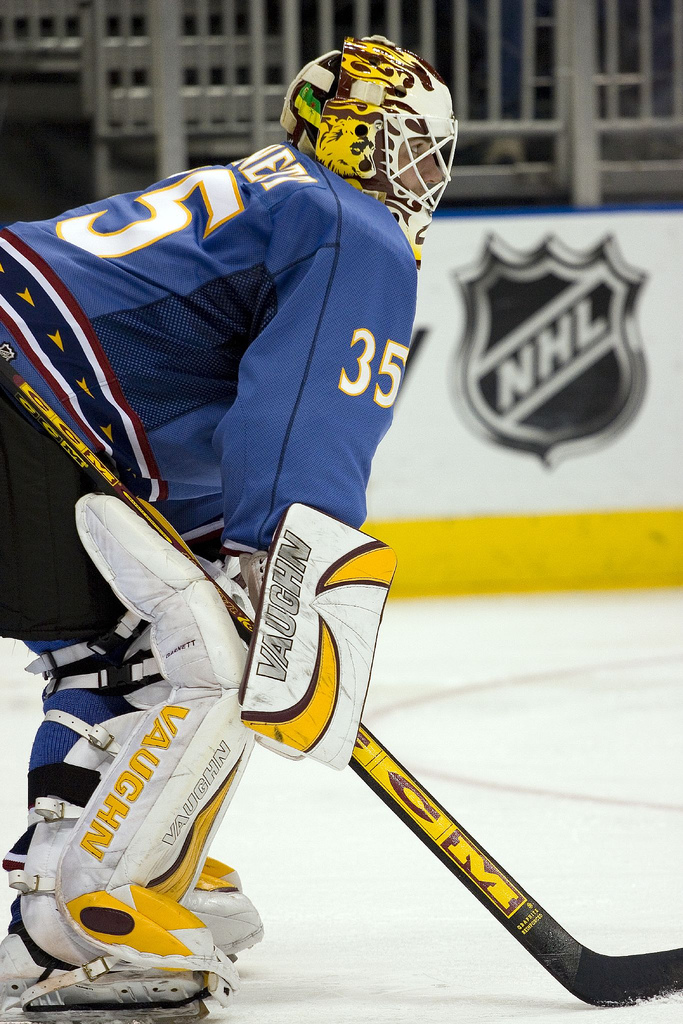
- Garnett with the Atlanta Thrashers in 2005
- Born: November 25, 1982 (age 43) Saskatoon, Saskatchewan, Canada
- Height: 6 ft 2 in (188 cm)
- Weight: 205 lb (93 kg; 14 st 9 lb)
- Position: Goaltender
- Caught: Left
- Played for: Atlanta Thrashers; MVD Balashikha; Neftekhimik Nizhnekamsk; Dynamo Moscow; Traktor Chelyabinsk; HC Slovan Bratislava; KHL Medvescak Zagreb; SC Bern; Nottingham Panthers
- National team: Canada
- NHL draft: 80th overall, 2001; Atlanta Thrashers
- Playing career: 2002–2019

Michael Garnett (born November 25, 1982) is a Canadian former professional ice hockey goaltender who last played for Nottingham Panthers of the Elite Ice Hockey League (EIHL). Garnett previously played for the National Hockey League's Atlanta Thrashers, who drafted him in the 3rd round (80th overall) of the 2001 NHL entry draft.

== Playing career ==
Garnett spent his junior career with the Red Deer Rebels and his hometown Saskatoon Blades of the Western Hockey League (WHL). He was named to the WHL All-Rookie Team for the 2000–01 season and was drafted by the Thrashers in the summer of 2001.

Garnett made his professional debut in the 2002–03 season playing for the Greenville Grrrowl of the East Coast Hockey League. Over two seasons with the Grrrowl and the Gwinnett Gladiators he posted a 37-25 record before securing a full-time job with the Thrashers top minor league affiliate, the Chicago Wolves of the American Hockey League (AHL). In total, Garnett appeared in 116 games for the Wolves, posting a 56-40-5 record.

Garnett was called up to the Thrashers early in the 2005–06 season due to a groin injury sustained by Thrashers starting goaltender Kari Lehtonen. Garnett made his NHL debut on October 12, 2005, when he replaced Mike Dunham, who suffered a groin injury less than ten minutes into a game against the Montreal Canadiens. The Thrashers lost the game 2-0, though Garnett stopped 29 of the 30 shots he faced and was named the game's second star. That season Garnett appeared in 24 games for Atlanta, including a franchise record 17 straight games from November 24 to December 28, 2005. When he was reassigned to Chicago in early January, he was in the midst of a ten game regulation undefeated streak (7-0-3), which included back-to-back shutouts on December 23 and 26 against the New Jersey Devils and Montreal Canadiens, respectively, through which he made 65 saves. Overall, Garnett posted a 10-7-4 record with the Thrashers.

Garnett's contract with the Thrashers expired after the 2006–07 season, which he spent entirely with the Chicago Wolves, splitting time with veteran Fred Brathwaite and posting a 23-15-1 record.

=== KHL ===
As an unrestricted free agent Garnett opted to sign a one-year contract with HC Neftekhimik Nizhnekamsk of the Russian Super League. He had a successful Russian debut, with Nizhnekamsk losing a 5 game series to the defending champions, Metallurg Magnitogorsk, in the first round of the playoffs. That summer, Garnett described his experience and how the language barrier was helping his hockey career: "Well, it literally was a blur for me because I couldn't understand anything. I could really focus and get deep into hockey more than I think I have before."

Garnett, again a free agent, signed a two-year contract with MVD Balashikha of the newly formed Kontinental Hockey League (KHL). After struggling through the 2008–09 season, posting a 15-17-1 record, Garnett bounced back for a successful 2009–10 campaign. He posted a 24-15-4 record, a 2.06 goals against average, .917 save percentage, and 5 shutouts. He played in the 2010 KHL All-Star game in Minsk and MVD won the Tarasov division title and Western Conference championship. In the Gagarin Cup Finals, MVD lost a close 7 game series to the defending champions, AK Bars Kazan. Garnett was named to the KHL's First All-Star team.

Following the 2009–10, MVD Balashikha merged with Dynamo Moscow to form UHC Dynamo. Garnett signed a one-year contract with the club prior to the start of the 2010–11 season. Despite missing some time to injury, Garnett had a successful season with Dynamo as the team finished 1st in their division with Garnett posting a 17-13-2 record and a .916 save percentage. UHC was upset in the first round of the playoffs in a six game series against Dinamo Riga, marking a disappointing end to what had been a strong season.

On May 2, 2011, Garnett signed a two-year contract with Traktor Chelyabinsk. His 2011-2012 season started in spectacular fashion, as he was chosen as goaltender of the month in the KHL for both October and November. He also played for Team Fedorov in the 2012 KHL All-Star game in Riga on Jan. 21, 2012. Michael won the Continental Cup with his team and became a fan favorite. He repeated as KHL Allstar in the 2012-13 season. His four-year stint at Chelyabinsk became to a close at the end of the 2014-15 season.

He was in Chelyabinsk for the Chelyabinsk meteor explosion in February 2013 and was unhurt by the explosion.

He then spent the 2015-16 campaign with HC Slovan Bratislava. On October 27, 2016, he was signed by another KHL club, Medvescak Zagreb of Croatia.

=== NLA ===
On February 13, 2017, Garnett was signed by SC Bern of the National League A (NLA) for the remainder of the season as a backup to add depth for the playoffs.

=== EIHL ===
Garnett moved to the UK in May 2017, signing for EIHL side Nottingham Panthers ahead of the 2017-18 season. He retired, after two seasons with the Panthers, in 2019.

== Career statistics ==
=== Regular season and playoffs ===
			Regular season										Playoffs
Season	Team	League	GP	W	L	T	OTL	MIN	GA	SO	GAA	SV%	GP	W	L	MIN	GA	SO	GAA	SV%
1997–98	Saskatoon Contacts U18	SMAAAHL	3	1	1	0	—	82	8	0	5.85	—	—	—	—	—	—	—	—	—
1998–99	Saskatoon Contacts U18	SMAAAHL	25	—	—	—	—	—	—	—	2.75	—	—	—	—	—	—	—	—	—
1998–99	Swift Current Legionnaires U18	SMAAAHL	—	—	—	—	—	—	—	—	—	—	—	—	—	—	—	—	—	—
1999–00	Kindersley Klippers	SJHL	36	—	—	—	—	2067	140	1	3.57	—	1	—	—	—	—	—	1.85	—
1999–00	Red Deer Rebels	WHL	1	0	0	0	—	14	0	0	0.00	1.000	1	0	1	65	2	0	1.85	.939
2000–01	Red Deer Rebels	WHL	21	14	5	1	—	1133	39	3	2.07	.905	—	—	—	—	—	—	—	—
2000–01	Saskatoon Blades	WHL	28	7	17	2	—	1501	83	1	3.32	.901	—	—	—	—	—	—	—	—
2001–02	Saskatoon Blades	WHL	67	27	34	4	—	3738	205	2	3.29	.897	7	3	4	450	15	0	2.00	.939
2002–03	Greenville Grrrowl	ECHL	38	16	15	3	—	2092	119	0	3.41	.895	3	1	2	178	13	0	4.38	.885
2002–03	Chicago Wolves	AHL	2	0	1	0	—	33	2	0	3.64	.875	—	—	—	—	—	—	—	—
2003–04	Gwinnett Gladiators	ECHL	33	21	10	2	—	1936	69	4	2.14	.926	12	7	5	770	34	0	2.65	.918
2003–04	Chicago Wolves	AHL	13	7	3	2	—	731	32	0	2.63	.914	—	—	—	—	—	—	—	—
2004–05	Chicago Wolves	AHL	24	11	9	0	—	1321	63	1	2.86	.911	2	2	0	119	3	0	1.51	.957
2005–06	Chicago Wolves	AHL	35	15	12	4	—	1892	106	1	3.36	.881	—	—	—	—	—	—	—	—
2005–06	Atlanta Thrashers	NHL	24	10	7	—	4	1271	73	2	3.44	.885	—	—	—	—	—	—	—	—
2006–07	Chicago Wolves	AHL	42	23	15	1	—	2380	120	2	3.03	.899	11	8	3	675	28	1	2.49	.910
2007–08	Neftekhimik Nizhnekamsk	RSL	50	—	—	—	—	2676	110	3	2.47	.902	5	2	3	236	0	4.10	—
2008–09	MVD Balashikha	KHL	38	14	21	1	—	2200	100	3	2.73	.889	—	—	—	—	—	—	—	—
2009–10	MVD Balashikha	KHL	44	24	15	4	—	2562	88	5	2.06	.917	22	14	8	1352	52	1	2.31	.903
2010–11	Dynamo Moscow	KHL	34	17	13	2	—	1927	72	2	2.24	.916	6	2	3	360	14	0	2.33	.894
2011–12	Traktor Chelyabinsk	KHL	45	29	10	6	—	2674	88	3	1.97	.922	16	8	7	988	29	1	1.76	.935
2012–13	Traktor Chelyabinsk	KHL	36	17	11	6	—	2128	78	3	2.20	.923	25	14	10	1546	48	5	1.86	.933
2013–14	Traktor Chelyabinsk	KHL	50	18	21	11	—	2991	126	3	2.53	.915	—	—	—	—	—	—	—	—
2014–15	Traktor Chelyabinsk	KHL	36	15	16	4	—	2157	79	1	2.20	.926	4	1	3	211	13	0	3.69	.879
2015–16	HC Slovan Bratislava	KHL	28	8	16	2	—	1517	72	2	2.85	.905	—	—	—	—	—	—	—	—
2016–17	KHL Medveščak Zagreb	KHL	17	4	11	1	—	877	46	2	3.15	.903	—	—	—	—	—	—	—	—
2017–18	Nottingham Panthers	EIHL	33	—	—	—	—	—	—	—	3.32	.893	—	—	—	—	—	—	—	—
2018–19	Nottingham Panthers	EIHL	47	—	—	—	—	—	—	—	2.91	.908	—	—	—	—	—	—	—	—
KHL totals			328	146	134	37	—	19039	749	24	2.36	.914	73	39	31	4459	156	7	2.10	.920
NHL totals			24	10	7	—	4	1271	73	2	3.45	.885	—	—	—	—	—	—	—	—
