= Sergei Lesnukhin =

Russian ice hockey player

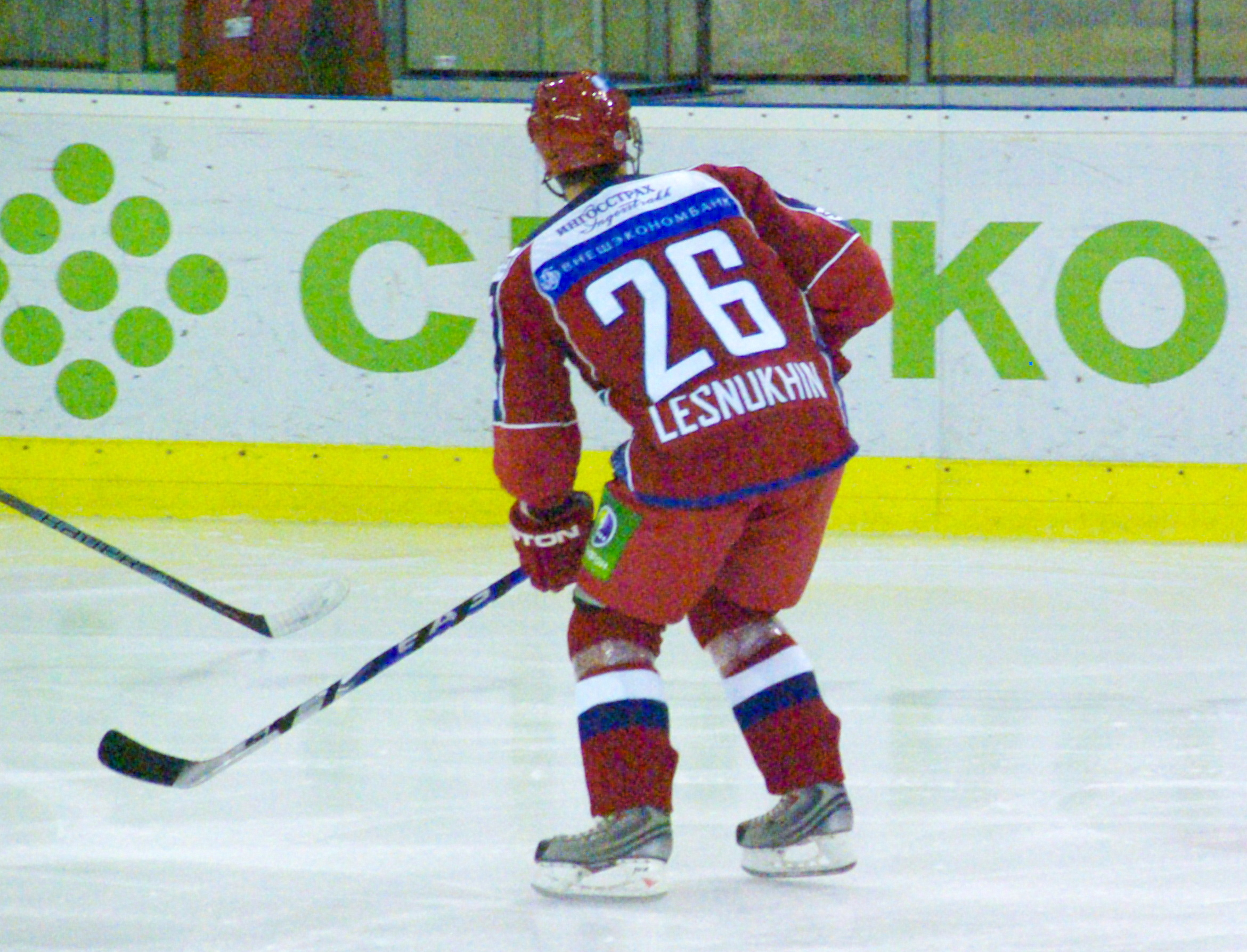
- Lesnukhin in 2010
- Born: February 9, 1987 (age 38); Lipetsk, Russian SFSR
- Height: 5 ft 10 in (178 cm)
- Weight: 183 lb (83 kg; 13 st 1 lb)
- Position: Forward
- Shot: Left
- Played for: Lokomotiv Yaroslavl; HC Vityaz; Admiral Vladivostok; HC Yugra
- Playing career: 2003–2020

Sergei Lesnukhin (Russian: Сергей Сергеевич Леснухин; born 9 February 1987) is a Russian former professional ice hockey forward. He played in the Russian Super League (RSL) and Kontinental Hockey League (KHL) with Lokomotiv Yaroslavl, HC Vityaz, Admiral Vladivostok and HC Yugra from 2005 to 2015.

== Career statistics ==
			Regular season					Playoffs
Season	Team	League	GP	G	A	Pts	PIM	GP	G	A	Pts	PIM
2003–04	Lokomotiv Yaroslavl-2	Russia3	38	6	8	14	12	—	—	—	—	—
2004–05	Lokomotiv Yaroslavl-2	Russia3	45	8	13	21	24	—	—	—	—	—
2005–06	Lokomotiv Yaroslavl	Russia	1	0	0	0	0	—	—	—	—	—
2005–06	Lokomotiv Yaroslavl-2	Russia3	39	8	16	24	20	—	—	—	—	—
2005–06	Dizel Penza	Russia2	7	0	0	0	8	4	1	0	1	0
2005–06	Dizel Penza-2	Russia3	1	2	0	2	0	—	—	—	—	—
2006–07	Kristall Saratov	Russia2	43	8	4	12	32	3	0	0	0	6
2006–07	Kristall Saratov-2	Russia3	4	1	0	1	20	—	—	—	—	—
2007–08	Kristall Saratov	Russia2	60	11	11	22	36	—	—	—	—	—
2007–08	Kristall Saratov-2	Russia3	2	1	0	1	0	—	—	—	—	—
2008–09	Kristall Saratov	Russia2	47	7	17	24	26	—	—	—	—	—
2009–10	Yuzhny Ural Orsk	Russia2	38	8	8	16	24	2	0	0	0	29
2010–11	Vityaz Chekhov	KHL	53	9	8	17	32	—	—	—	—	—
2011–12	Vityaz Chekhov	KHL	42	2	8	10	14	—	—	—	—	—
2012–13	Vityaz Chekhov	KHL	24	2	2	4	6	—	—	—	—	—
2012–13	HC Kuban	VHL	11	0	6	6	0	—	—	—	—	—
2013–14	Admiral Vladivostok	KHL	19	1	3	4	4	—	—	—	—	—
2013–14	Yugra Khanty-Mansiysk	KHL	8	1	1	2	4	—	—	—	—	—
2014–15	Yugra Khanty-Mansiysk	KHL	34	3	3	6	16	—	—	—	—	—
2015–16	Neftyanik Almetyevsk	VHL	44	13	6	19	4	15	1	3	4	2
2016–17	Neftyanik Almetyevsk	VHL	29	2	5	7	2	—	—	—	—	—
2016–17	Yermak Angarsk	VHL	10	5	2	7	31	3	0	1	1	4
2017–18	HC Ryazan	VHL	21	2	6	8	6	—	—	—	—	—
2019–20	Gornyak Rudny	Kazakhstan	3	1	0	1	2	—	—	—	—	—
KHL totals			180	18	25	43	76	—	—	—	—	—
VHL totals			115	22	25	47	43	18	1	4	5	6
