= Denis Osipov =

Russian-Chinese ice hockey player

- Born: May 9, 1987 (age 38) Moscow, Russian SFSR
- Height: 6 ft 0 in (183 cm)
- Weight: 198 lb (90 kg; 14 st 2 lb)
- Position: Defence
- Shoots: Left
- KHL team Former teams: Free Agent; Krylya Sovetov Moscow; HC MVD; Avtomobilist Yekaterinburg; HC Yugra; Admiral Vladivostok; Metallurg Magnitogorsk; Lokomotiv Yaroslavl; Dinamo Minsk; Kunlun Red Star
- National team: China
- Playing career: 2004–present

Denis Andreyevich Osipov (born May 9, 1987), also competing as Dannisi Aoxibofu, is a former Russian-born Chinese professional ice hockey defenceman. He most recently played under contract with HC Kunlun Red Star of the Kontinental Hockey League (KHL). He represented China at the 2022 Winter Olympics.

During the 2015–16 season, Osipov played 21 games with Admiral Vladivostok before he was claimed off waivers by Metallurg Magnitogorsk on November 9, 2015.

Due to his stint in China, Osipov was called up to represent the China men's national ice hockey team for the 2022 Winter Olympics.

== Career statistics ==
=== Regular season and playoffs ===
			Regular season					Playoffs
Season	Team	League	GP	G	A	Pts	PIM	GP	G	A	Pts	PIM
2002–03	CSKA–2 Moscow	RUS.3	3	0	0	0	4	—	—	—	—	—
2003–04	Krylia Sovetov–2 Moscow	RUS.3	14	0	3	3	8	—	—	—	—	—
2004–05	Krylia Sovetov Moscow	RUS.2	14	0	0	0	16	—	—	—	—	—
2004–05	Krylia Sovetov–2 Moscow	RUS.3	33	3	4	7	40	—	—	—	—	—
2005–06	Krylia Sovetov Moscow	RUS.2	24	0	2	2	24	17	0	0	0	20
2005–06	Krylia Sovetov–2 Moscow	RUS.3	26	0	3	3	59	—	—	—	—	—
2006–07	Krylia Sovetov Moscow	RSL	39	1	3	4	30	—	—	—	—	—
2006–07	Krylia Sovetov–2 Moscow	RUS.3	5	2	3	5	6	—	—	—	—	—
2007–08	Krylia Sovetov Moscow	RUS.2	28	1	7	8	40	3	1	0	1	10
2007–08	Krylia Sovetov–2 Moscow	RUS.3	4	2	2	4	4	—	—	—	—	—
2008–09	HC MVD	KHL	1	0	0	0	0	—	—	—	—	—
2008–09	Kristall Elektrostal	RUS.2	48	6	16	22	94	—	—	—	—	—
2008–09	HC–2 MVD	RUS.3	16	5	8	13	46	4	0	3	3	6
2009–10	HC Rys	RUS.2	32	3	9	12	36	—	—	—	—	—
2009–10	Krylia Sovetov Moscow	RUS.2	5	3	3	6	6	5	0	1	1	2
2009–10	Krylia Stolitsy Moscow	RUS.3	2	2	1	3	0	—	—	—	—	—
2010–11	HC Sarov	VHL	45	8	11	19	32	4	0	0	0	4
2011–12	Avtomobilist Yekaterinburg	KHL	52	7	4	11	32	—	—	—	—	—
2012–13	HC Yugra	KHL	17	0	1	1	14	—	—	—	—	—
2012–13	Saryarka Karagandy	VHL	9	0	3	3	4	—	—	—	—	—
2013–14	Admiral Vladivostok	KHL	54	2	6	8	30	1	0	0	0	2
2014–15	Admiral Vladivostok	KHL	51	0	11	11	34	—	—	—	—	—
2015–16	Admiral Vladivostok	KHL	21	2	1	3	10	—	—	—	—	—
2015–16	Metallurg Magnitogorsk	KHL	27	2	3	5	8	12	1	1	2	2
2016–17	Lokomotiv Yaroslavl	KHL	20	2	3	5	14	6	0	0	0	4
2017–18	Lokomotiv Yaroslavl	KHL	20	1	2	3	24	—	—	—	—	—
2017–18	Dinamo Minsk	KHL	18	1	4	5	16	—	—	—	—	—
2018–19	Dinamo Minsk	KHL	43	3	4	7	22	—	—	—	—	—
2019–20	Kunlun Red Star	KHL	35	1	2	3	16	—	—	—	—	—
2020–21	Kunlun Red Star	KHL	13	1	3	4	4	—	—	—	—	—
2021–22	CSM Corona Brașov	ROU	1	0	0	0	0	—	—	—	—	—
2021–22	Kunlun Red Star	KHL	28	0	1	1	18	—	—	—	—	—
KHL totals			400	22	45	67	242	19	1	1	2	8

=== International ===
Year	Team	Event	GP	G	A	Pts	PIM
2005	Russia	WJC18	6	0	0	0	4
2022	China	OG	4	0	0	0	2
Senior totals			4	0	0	0	2
