= Mikhail Anisin =

Russian professional ice hockey forward

- Born: March 1, 1988 (age 37) Moscow, Russian SFSR
- Height: 5 ft 4.5 in (164 cm)
- Weight: 150 lb (68 kg; 10 st 10 lb)
- Position: Right wing
- Shoots: Left
- Erste team Former teams: SC Csíkszereda; CSKA Moscow; Krylya Sovetov; Sibir Novosibirsk; Severstal Cherepovets; Yugra Khanty-Mansiysk; Vityaz Chekhov; Dynamo Moscow; HC Neftekhimik Nizhnekamsk; HC Donbass; HC Sochi; Metallurg Novokuznetsk
- Playing career: 2005–present

Mikhail Vyacheslavovich Anisin (born March 1, 1988) is a professional Russian ice hockey forward. He is currently playing for SC Csíkszereda in the Erste Liga.

== Playing career ==
On 20 October 2013, Anisin was contracted by HC Donbass for a 4th round selection in the 2014 KHL draft while playing for HC Neftekhimik Nizhnekamsk .

In November 2013, Anisin got into a fist fight with teammate Serhiy Varlamov following an altercation at a nightclub while in Ufa. This was a day prior to a game against Salavat Yulaev. Anisin fought with Varlamov, bouncers and later doctors at the hospital where he was being treated. He received two black eyes and a concussion. HC Donbass terminated Anisin's contract after 6 games during the 2013 – 2014 season for disciplinary reasons related to the fight.

On 7 August 2014, Anisin made a comeback his to the KHL in a try-out contract with expansion club, HC Sochi. On 27 August 2014, he signed a contract for a one-year deal for the ensuing 2014–15 season.

== Personal life ==
He is the son of Vyacheslav Anisin and the brother of Marina Anissina. Anisin is of Ukrainian descent on his mother's side. He remarked in an interview that his ancestors were Don Cossacks.

== Career statistics ==
			Regular season					Playoffs
Season	Team	League	GP	G	A	Pts	PIM	GP	G	A	Pts	PIM
2005–06	CSKA Moscow 2	RUS 3	39	24	16	40	22	—	—	—	—	—
2005–06	Khimik Voskresensk	RUS 2	7	0	0	0	0	—	—	—	—	—
2005–06	Khimik Voskresensk 2	RUS 3	3	1	1	2	0	—	—	—	—	—
2006–07	CSKA Moscow	RSL	10	1	1	2	0	—	—	—	—	—
2006–07	CSKA Moscow 2	RUS 3	7	6	2	8	2	—	—	—	—	—
2006–07	PHC Krylya Sovetov	RSL	19	2	4	6	0	—	—	—	—	—
2006–07	PHC Krylya Sovetov 2	RUS 3	3	1	4	5	0	—	—	—	—	—
2007–08	PHC Krylya Sovetov	RUS 2	48	36	27	63	34	—	—	—	—	—
2007–08	PHC Krylya Sovetov 2	RUS 3	19	1	1	2	18	—	—	—	—	—
2008–09	Sibir Novosibirsk	KHL	38	13	5	18	39	—	—	—	—	—
2008–09	MHC Krylya Sovetov	RUS 2	—	—	—	—	—	15	12	14	26	6
2009–10	Sibir Novosibirsk	KHL	47	14	13	27	12	—	—	—	—	—
2010–11	Severstal Cherepovets	RUS 3	16	3	1	4	8	—	—	—	—	—
2010–11	Yugra Khanty-Mansiysk	KHL	13	1	3	4	4	—	—	—	—	—
2010–11	Vityaz Chekhov	KHL	10	2	3	5	4	—	—	—	—	—
2011–12	Vityaz Chekhov	KHL	38	16	13	29	37	—	—	—	—	—
2011–12	Dynamo Moscow	KHL	11	3	3	6	0	21	14	5	19	2
2012–13	Dynamo Moscow	KHL	17	2	5	7	8	—	—	—	—	—
2012–13	Severstal Cherepovets	KHL	14	3	4	7	4	10	6	2	8	4
2013–14	Neftekhimik Nizhnekamsk	KHL	14	4	4	8	8	—	—	—	—	—
2013–14	HC Donbass	KHL	6	0	0	0	2	—	—	—	—	—
2014–15	HC Sochi	KHL	38	9	13	22	30	4	2	0	2	2
2015–16	HC Sochi	KHL	50	13	13	26	30	4	0	1	1	27
2016–17	Metallurg Novokuznetsk	KHL	20	0	2	2	6	—	—	—	—	—
2016–17	Saryarka Karaganda	VHL	10	4	3	7	2	9	4	4	8	2
2017–18	Dynamo Moscow	KHL	11	1	3	4	6	—	—	—	—	—
RSL totals			29	3	5	8	0	—	—	—	—	—
KHL totals			343	84	85	169	198	39	22	8	30	35
