= Niclas Bergfors =

Swedish ice hockey player (born 1987)

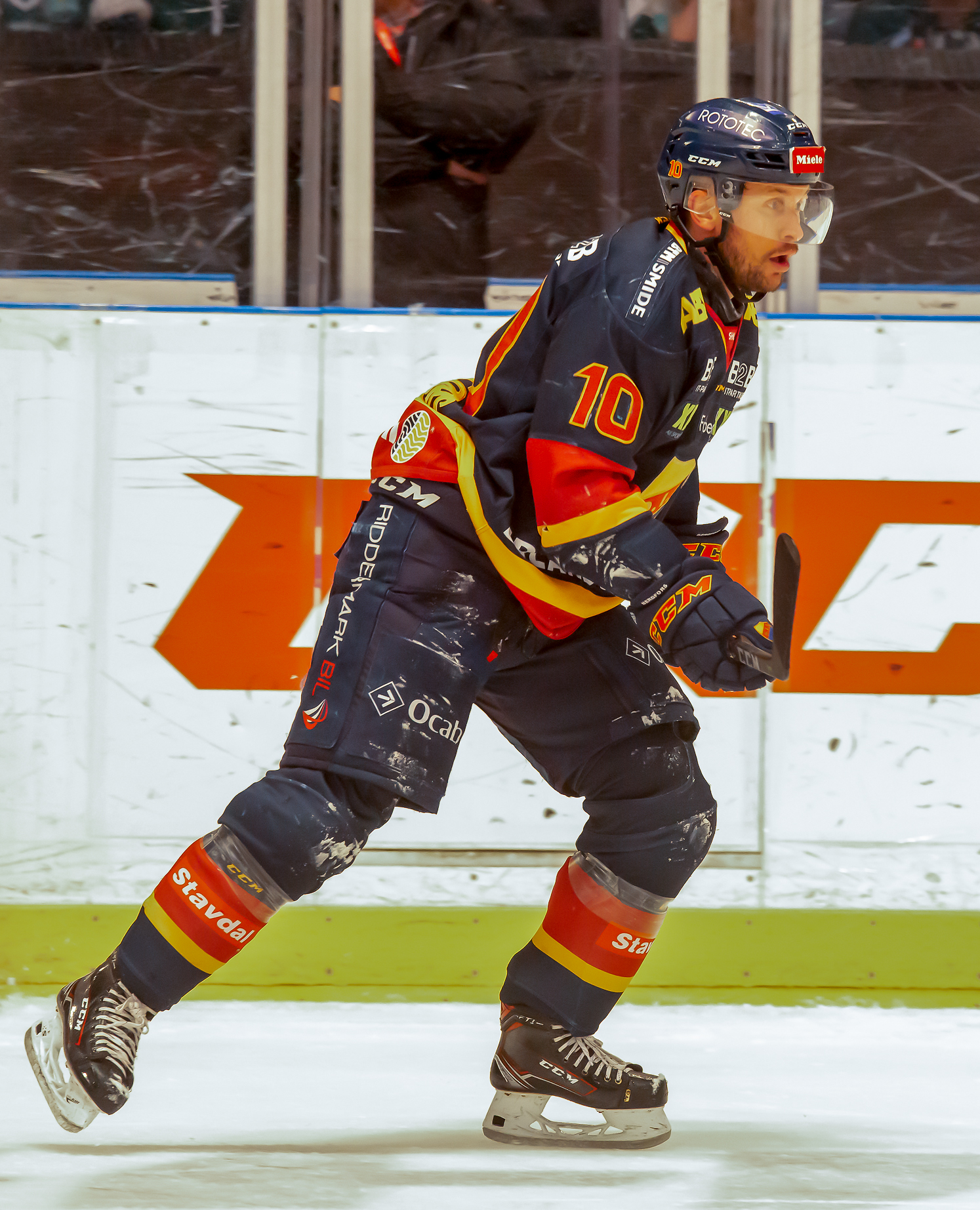
- Bergfors with Djurgårdens IF in 2019
- Born: 7 March 1987 (age 39) Södertälje, Sweden
- Height: 5 ft 10 in (178 cm)
- Weight: 200 lb (91 kg; 14 st 4 lb)
- Position: Right wing
- Shoots: Right
- SHL team Former teams: Free Agent; Södertälje SK; New Jersey Devils; Atlanta Thrashers; Florida Panthers; Nashville Predators; Ak Bars Kazan; Severstal Cherepovets; Admiral Vladivostok; Amur Khabarovsk; Linköpings HC; Djurgårdens IF
- NHL draft: 23rd overall, 2005; New Jersey Devils
- Playing career: 2004–present

Niclas Bergfors (born 7 March 1987) is a Swedish professional ice hockey right winger currently an unrestricted free agent. He most recently played for Djurgårdens IF then of the Swedish Hockey League (SHL). He was drafted by the National Hockey League (NHL)'s New Jersey Devils in the first round, 23rd overall, at the 2005 NHL entry draft, playing for the organization for four-and-a-half seasons before joining the Atlanta Thrashers 2010, Florida Panthers in 2011 and Nashville Predators via free agency in 2011. He later joined the KHL's Ak Bars Kazan in late 2011 before signing with Severstal Cherepovets. In 2013, he joined Admiral Vladivostok, where he played for three seasons before joining Amur Khabarovsk in a mid-season trade.

== Playing career ==
In 2004–05, prior to being drafted to the NHL, Bergfors played for hometown club Södertälje SK of the Elitserien.

Bergfors spent the 2005–06 season with the New Jersey Devils' American Hockey League (AHL) affiliate, the Albany River Rats, scoring 17 goals and 40 points in 65 games. During the season, he represented Sweden at the 2006 World Junior Ice Hockey Championships, scoring three goals and six points in six games.

In 2006–07, Bergfors played for New Jersey's new AHL affiliate, the Lowell Devils, where he scored 13 goals and 32 points in 60 games. He once again played with Sweden in the 2007 World Junior Championships, where he posted two assists in seven games.

Bergfors returned to Lowell for the 2007–08 season, where he saw his production decrease to 12 goals and 27 points in 66 games. He did make his NHL debut, however, going pointless in one game with New Jersey. He spent the majority of the 2008–09 season with Lowell, scoring 22 goals and 51 points in 66 games, also playing in eight games with New Jersey, scoring one goal.

In 2009–10, Bergfors made the Devils' opening day roster, and in 54 games with New Jersey, he scored 13 goals and 27 points. On 4 February 2010, however, the Devils traded Bergfors, along with Johnny Oduya, Patrice Cormier and their first-round pick in 2010, to the Atlanta Thrashers in exchange for Ilya Kovalchuk, Anssi Salmela and Atlanta's second-round pick in 2010.

Bergfors finished 2009–10 with Atlanta, where he scored eight goals and 17 points in 27 games. After the season, he was named to the NHL All-Rookie Team after scoring 21 goals and 44 points in 81 games with both the Devils and Thrashers. In 2010–11, Bergfors saw his numbers slide, scoring 11 goals and 29 points in 52 games with Atlanta. On 28 February 2011, the Thrashers traded Bergfors and Patrick Rissmiller to the Florida Panthers for Radek Dvořák and Florida's fifth-round draft pick in 2011.

On 4 July 2011, Bergfors signed a one-year, $575,000 contract with the Nashville Predators as a free agent. He was put on unconditional waivers by the Predators on 24 November 2011, making him a free agent.

Bergfors then signed with the Ak Bars Kazan on 2 December 2011, playing just eight games before joining Severstal Cherepovets on a two-year contract. In June 2013, he was drafted at the KHL Expansion Draft by Admiral Vladivostok.

After 12 years playing professionally abroad, Bergfors returned to his native Sweden agreeing to a two-year contract with Linköpings HC of the SHL on May 4, 2016. On February 15, 2017, Niklas left mid-season to sign a contract with fellow SHL club, Djurgårdens IF Hockey until the end of the 2018 season.

== Career statistics ==
=== Regular season and playoffs ===
			Regular season					Playoffs
Season	Team	League	GP	G	A	Pts	PIM	GP	G	A	Pts	PIM
2002–03	Södertälje SK	J18 Allsv	4	4	4	8	0	—	—	—	—	—
2002–03	Södertälje SK	J20	10	0	4	4	2	—	—	—	—	—
2003–04	Södertälje SK	J18 Allsv	5	14	4	18	4	2	0	1	1	6
2003–04	Södertälje SK	J20	31	13	17	30	22	2	1	1	2	0
2004–05	Södertälje SK	J20	21	18	16	34	25	3	0	3	3	4
2004–05	Södertälje SK	SEL	25	1	0	1	2	2	0	0	0	0
2005–06	Albany River Rats	AHL	65	17	23	40	10	—	—	—	—	—
2006–07	Lowell Devils	AHL	60	13	19	32	8	—	—	—	—	—
2007–08	Lowell Devils	AHL	66	12	15	27	22	—	—	—	—	—
2007–08	New Jersey Devils	NHL	1	0	0	0	0	—	—	—	—	—
2008–09	Lowell Devils	AHL	66	22	29	51	14	—	—	—	—	—
2008–09	New Jersey Devils	NHL	8	1	0	1	0	—	—	—	—	—
2009–10	New Jersey Devils	NHL	54	13	14	27	10	—	—	—	—	—
2009–10	Atlanta Thrashers	NHL	27	8	9	17	0	—	—	—	—	—
2010–11	Atlanta Thrashers	NHL	52	11	18	29	6	—	—	—	—	—
2010–11	Florida Panthers	NHL	20	1	6	7	2	—	—	—	—	—
2011–12	Nashville Predators	NHL	11	1	1	2	2	—	—	—	—	—
2011–12	Ak Bars Kazan	KHL	8	0	1	1	2	—	—	—	—	—
2011–12	Severstal Cherepovets	KHL	13	4	3	7	4	6	0	1	1	0
2012–13	Severstal Cherepovets	KHL	45	8	10	18	2	9	0	3	3	0
2013–14	Admiral Vladivostok	KHL	54	17	19	36	18	5	1	1	2	2
2014–15	Admiral Vladivostok	KHL	60	21	23	44	14	—	—	—	—	—
2015–16	Admiral Vladivostok	KHL	25	3	8	11	6	—	—	—	—	—
2015–16	Sokol Krasnoyarsk	VHL	2	0	0	0	0	—	—	—	—	—
2015–16	Amur Khabarovsk	KHL	23	6	7	13	10	—	—	—	—	—
2016–17	Linköpings HC	SHL	37	3	2	5	10	—	—	—	—	—
2016–17	Djurgårdens IF	SHL	10	2	3	5	2	3	3	1	4	2
2017–18	Djurgårdens IF	SHL	52	14	13	27	14	11	2	2	4	2
2018–19	Djurgårdens IF	SHL	52	6	15	21	12	19	2	6	8	6
2019–20	Djurgårdens IF	SHL	52	12	11	23	22	—	—	—	—	—
2020–21	Djurgårdens IF	SHL	52	15	12	27	14	3	0	1	1	2
2021–22	Djurgårdens IF	SHL	50	2	3	5	8	—	—	—	—	—
SHL totals			330	55	59	114	84	38	7	10	17	12
NHL totals			173	35	48	83	20	—	—	—	—	—
KHL totals			228	59	71	130	56	20	1	5	6	2

=== International ===
Medal record

Representing Sweden

Ice hockey

IIHF U18 Championships
Bronze medal – third place	2005 České Budějovice	

Year	Team	Event	Result	GP	G	A	Pts	PIM
2004	Sweden	WJC18	5th	6	1	2	3	6
2005	Sweden	WJC	6th	6	2	1	3	2
2005	Sweden	WJC18	3rd place, bronze medalist(s)	7	6	0	6	0
2006	Sweden	WJC	5th	6	3	3	6	2
2007	Sweden	WJC	4th	7	0	2	2	0
Junior totals				32	12	8	20	10

Awards and achievements
Preceded by Travis Zajac	New Jersey Devils first-round draft pick 2005	Succeeded by Matt Corrente
