= Sergei Barbashev =

Russian professional ice hockey player

- Born: July 26, 1992 (age 33) Moscow, Russia
- Height: 6 ft 0 in (183 cm)
- Weight: 165 lb (75 kg; 11 st 11 lb)
- Position: Left wing
- Shoots: Left
- KHL team Former teams: Free Agent; CSKA Moscow; Admiral Vladivostok; Sibir Novosibirsk
- Playing career: 2011–present

Sergei Dmitrievich Barbashev (Russian: Сергей Дмитриевич Барбашёв; born July 26, 1992) is a Russian professional ice hockey player. He is currently an unrestricted free agent. He most recently played under contract for HC Sibir Novosibirsk of the Kontinental Hockey League (KHL).

== Playing career ==
Barbashev made his KHL debut with HC CSKA Moscow during the 2010/11 KHL season. On June 17, 2013, he was taken 17th overall in the 2013 KHL Expansion Draft by Admiral Vladivostok, making him the youngest player taken in the draft at 21.

Barbashev was invited to Chicago Wolves training camp in 2015, in which his brother Ivan was also attending for the first time after being drafted in the 2014 NHL entry draft by the St. Louis Blues. He was released from training camp without a contract on October 4.

On 15 May 2017, Barbashev signed a two-year contract extension with Admiral. The following day he was traded to HC Sibir Novosibirsk for monetary compensation.

== International play ==
Medal record

Representing Russia

Men's ice hockey

World Junior Championships
Silver medal – second place	2012 Canada	

Competing internationally with Team Russia, Barbashev won silver at the 2012 World Junior Ice Hockey Championships.

== Personal life ==
Barbashev's brother Ivan plays professionally in the National Hockey League for the Vegas Golden Knights.

== Career statistics ==
=== Regular season and playoffs ===
			Regular season					Playoffs
Season	Team	League	GP	G	A	Pts	PIM	GP	G	A	Pts	PIM
2009–10	Krasnaya Armiya	MHL	48	24	21	45	26	4	3	3	6	2
2010–11	CSKA Moskva	KHL	3	0	0	0	0	—	—	—	—	—
2010–11	Krasnaya Armiya	MHL	53	17	29	46	54	15	1	8	9	20
2011–12	CSKA Moskva	KHL	39	2	5	7	4	3	0	0	0	0
2011–12	Krasnaya Armiya	MHL	15	7	6	13	4	19	5	9	14	26
2012–13	CSKA Moskva	KHL	42	1	4	5	2	3	0	0	0	0
2012–13	THK Tver	VHL	8	3	4	7	2	—	—	—	—	—
2012–13	Krasnaya Armiya	MHL	1	0	1	1	2	—	—	—	—	—
2013–14	Admiral Vladivostok	KHL	51	6	7	13	4	5	0	0	0	0
2014–15	Admiral Vladivostok	KHL	8	1	0	1	2	—	—	—	—	—
2014–15	Molot-Prikamye	VHL	14	4	2	6	6	11	1	5	6	20
2015–16	Admiral Vladivostok	KHL	—	—	—	—	—	2	0	0	0	0
2015–16	Sokol Krasnoyarsk	VHL	26	10	9	19	9	—	—	—	—	—
2016–17	Admiral Vladivostok	KHL	35	3	4	7	43	5	1	0	1	4
2017–18	Sibir Novosibirsk	KHL	6	0	0	0	2	—	—	—	—	—
2018–19	Sibir Novosibirsk	KHL	8	0	1	1	6	—	—	—	—	—
2018–19	Metallurg Novokuznetsk	VHL	36	16	19	35	29	4	0	0	0	4
KHL totals			192	13	21	34	63	15	1	0	1	4

=== International ===
Year	Team	Event	Result	GP	G	A	Pts	PIM
2009	Russia	U17	7th	5	0	7	7	2
2010	Russia	WJC18	4th	7	2	6	8	6
2012	Russia	WJC	2nd place, silver medalist(s)	7	0	3	3	0
Junior totals				19	2	16	18	8
