= Anton Poleschuk =

Russian ice hockey player

- Born: February 21, 1987 (age 39) Surgut, Russian SFSR, Soviet Union
- Height: 5 ft 10 in (178 cm)
- Weight: 181 lb (82 kg; 12 st 13 lb)
- Position: Defence
- Shot: Left
- Played for: HC MVD; Molot-Prikamye Perm; Metallurg Magnitogorsk; Khimik Voskresensk; Amur Khabarovsk; Admiral Vladivostok; Avangard Omsk; High1
- NHL draft: Undrafted
- Playing career: 2005–2020

Anton Poleschuk (born February 21, 1987) is a Russian professional ice hockey defenceman. He is currently a free agent having last played for High1 in Asia League Ice Hockey.

Poleschuk made his Kontinental Hockey League debut playing with Khimik Voskresensk during the 2008-09 season.

== Career statistics ==
| | | | Regular season | | | | | Playoffs |
| Season | Team | League | GP | G | A | Pts | PIM | GP | G | A | Pts | PIM |
|---|---|---|---|---|---|---|---|---|---|---|---|---|
| 2003–04 | Metallurg Magnitogorsk-2 | Russia3 | 41 | 4 | 9 | 13 | 52 | — | — | — | — | — |
| 2004–05 | Metallurg Magnitogorsk-2 | Russia3 | 37 | 9 | 10 | 19 | 44 | — | — | — | — | — |
| 2005–06 | Metallurg Magnitogorsk-2 | Russia3 | 21 | 6 | 18 | 24 | 73 | — | — | — | — | — |
| 2005–06 | HC MVD | Russia | 4 | 0 | 0 | 0 | 4 | — | — | — | — | — |
| 2005–06 | HK MVD-THK Tver | Russia3 | 3 | 0 | 1 | 1 | 4 | — | — | — | — | — |
| 2005–06 | Molot-Prikamye Perm | Russia | 18 | 1 | 1 | 2 | 20 | — | — | — | — | — |
| 2006–07 | Metallurg Magnitogorsk | Russia | 17 | 0 | 0 | 0 | 6 | 3 | 0 | 0 | 0 | 0 |
| 2006–07 | Metallurg Magnitogorsk-2 | Russia3 | 18 | 8 | 11 | 19 | 60 | — | — | — | — | — |
| 2007–08 | Khimik Voskresensk | Russia2 | 56 | 7 | 7 | 14 | 48 | 14 | 2 | 4 | 6 | 18 |
| 2008–09 | Khimik Voskresensk | KHL | 34 | 1 | 3 | 4 | 50 | — | — | — | — | — |
| 2009–10 | Gazovik Tyumen | Russia2 | 39 | 2 | 16 | 18 | 24 | 8 | 1 | 1 | 2 | 14 |
| 2010–11 | Toros Neftekamsk | VHL | 54 | 9 | 17 | 26 | 44 | 7 | 1 | 0 | 1 | 6 |
| 2011–12 | Toros Neftekamsk | VHL | 45 | 2 | 16 | 18 | 40 | 16 | 3 | 7 | 10 | 4 |
| 2012–13 | Yuzhny Ural Orsk | VHL | 22 | 0 | 9 | 9 | 10 | — | — | — | — | — |
| 2012–13 | Amur Khabarovsk | KHL | 18 | 2 | 1 | 3 | 14 | — | — | — | — | — |
| 2013–14 | Admiral Vladivostok | KHL | 25 | 0 | 3 | 3 | 18 | — | — | — | — | — |
| 2013–14 | Avangard Omsk | KHL | 19 | 0 | 1 | 1 | 6 | — | — | — | — | — |
| 2014–15 | Rubin Tyumen | VHL | 5 | 0 | 0 | 0 | 4 | — | — | — | — | — |
| 2014–15 | Sputnik Nizhny Tagil | VHL | 34 | 4 | 10 | 14 | 18 | 7 | 1 | 1 | 2 | 6 |
| 2015–16 | Sputnik Nizhny Tagil | VHL | 34 | 4 | 11 | 15 | 24 | — | — | — | — | — |
| 2015–16 | Torpedo Ust-Kamenogorsk | VHL | 12 | 0 | 1 | 1 | 10 | 6 | 0 | 0 | 0 | 0 |
| 2016–17 | Neftyanik Almetyevsk | VHL | 36 | 0 | 10 | 10 | 54 | 1 | 0 | 0 | 0 | 0 |
| 2017–18 | Ertis-Pavlodar | Kazakhstan | 43 | 9 | 16 | 25 | 40 | 5 | 1 | 1 | 2 | 25 |
| 2018–19 | Gangwon High1 | Asia League | 34 | 0 | 11 | 11 | 36 | — | — | — | — | — |
| 2019–20 | PSK Sakhalin | Asia League | 35 | 1 | 9 | 10 | 36 | 2 | 0 | 1 | 1 | 0 |
| KHL totals | | | 96 | 3 | 8 | 11 | 88 | — | — | — | — | — |
| Russia totals | | | 39 | 1 | 1 | 2 | 30 | 3 | 0 | 0 | 0 | 0 |
| VHL totals | | | 242 | 19 | 74 | 93 | 204 | 37 | 5 | 8 | 13 | 16 |
| Russia2 totals | | | 95 | 9 | 23 | 32 | 72 | 22 | 3 | 5 | 8 | 32 |
| Asia League totals | | | 69 | 1 | 20 | 21 | 72 | 2 | 0 | 1 | 1 | 0 |
