= Andrei Nikitenko =

Russian ice hockey player

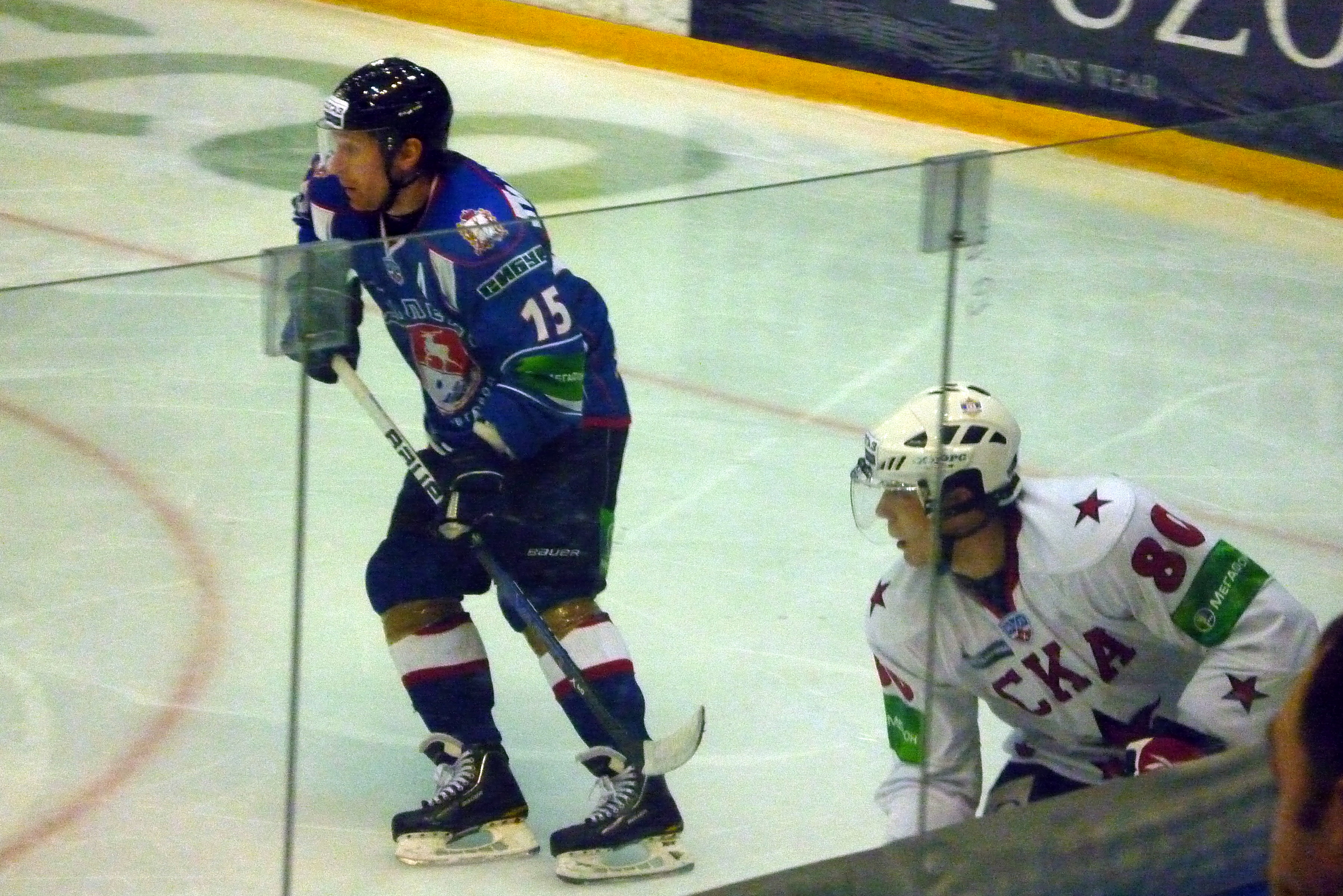
- Andrei Nikitenko (blue) on Dec 12, 2010
- Born: January 13, 1979 (age 46); Tyumen, Russian SFSR, USSR
- Height: 5 ft 11 in (180 cm)
- Weight: 187 lb (85 kg; 13 st 5 lb)
- Position: Center
- Shot: Left
- Played for: Rubin Tyumen; Ak Bars Kazan; Severstal Cherepovets; Metallurg Novokuznetsk; CSKA Moscow; Torpedo Nizhny Novgorod; Sibir Novosibirsk; Admiral Vladivostok; Lada Togliatti
- Playing career: 1997–2016

Andrei Nikitenko (born January 13, 1979) is a Russian former professional ice hockey forward who concluded his nineteen-year professional career as Captain of HC Lada Togliatti in the 2015–16 season of the then Kontinental Hockey League (KHL).

== Career statistics ==
			Regular season					Playoffs
Season	Team	League	GP	G	A	Pts	PIM	GP	G	A	Pts	PIM
1994–95	Rubin Tyumen-2	Russia2	17	2	1	3	2	—	—	—	—	—
1995–96	Nadezhda Chelyabinsk	Russia2	12	1	0	1	0	—	—	—	—	—
1996–97	Yunior-T Kurgan	Russia3	6	0	1	1	2	—	—	—	—	—
1997–98	Rubin Tyumen	Russia	35	5	6	11	2	2	2	0	2	0
1998–99	Rubin Tyumen	Russia	38	2	6	8	18	—	—	—	—	—
1998–99	Rubin Tyumen-2	Russia3	2	2	1	3	0	—	—	—	—	—
1999–00	Neftyanik Leninogorsk	Russia2	2	0	0	0	0	—	—	—	—	—
1999–00	Ak Bars Kazan	Russia	8	0	1	1	0	11	1	0	1	0
1999–00	Ak Bars Kazan-2	Russia3	3	2	1	3	0	—	—	—	—	—
2000–01	Ak Bars Kazan	Russia	26	0	11	11	2	4	0	0	0	2
2000–01	Ak Bars Kazan-2	Russia3	3	1	5	6	0	—	—	—	—	—
2001–02	Ak Bars Kazan	Russia	51	4	10	14	16	11	1	0	1	2
2002–03	Severstal Cherepovets	Russia	48	8	17	25	12	12	2	2	4	8
2003–04	Severstal Cherepovets	Russia	51	2	6	8	42	—	—	—	—	—
2004–05	Metallurg Magnitogorsk	Russia	12	0	1	1	0	—	—	—	—	—
2004–05	HC CSKA Moscow	Russia	36	2	5	7	10	—	—	—	—	—
2005–06	HC CSKA Moscow	Russia	51	9	9	18	26	7	0	0	0	2
2006–07	HC CSKA Moscow	Russia	49	3	4	7	30	10	1	1	2	2
2007–08	HC Sibir Novosibirsk	Russia	38	3	5	8	14	—	—	—	—	—
2008–09	Torpedo Nizhny Novgorod	KHL	56	9	19	28	20	3	1	1	2	2
2009–10	Torpedo Nizhny Novgorod	KHL	56	11	12	23	18	—	—	—	—	—
2010–11	Torpedo Nizhny Novgorod	KHL	54	6	10	16	10	—	—	—	—	—
2011–12	Torpedo Nizhny Novgorod	KHL	29	3	5	8	2	—	—	—	—	—
2012–13	HC Sibir Novosibirsk	KHL	26	0	3	3	2	—	—	—	—	—
2013–14	Admiral Vladivostok	KHL	48	9	5	14	18	5	0	1	1	0
2014–15	HC Lada Togliatti	KHL	58	6	13	19	14	—	—	—	—	—
2015–16	HC Lada Togliatti	KHL	24	2	1	3	10	—	—	—	—	—
KHL totals			351	46	68	114	94	8	1	2	3	2
Russia totals			443	38	81	119	172	57	7	3	10	16
