= Konstantin Sokolov =

Russian professional ice hockey forward (born 1991)

- Born: May 12, 1991 (age 34) Ust-Kamenogorsk, Kazakhstan
- Height: 6 ft 0 in (183 cm)
- Weight: 179 lb (81 kg; 12 st 11 lb)
- Position: Forward
- Shoots: Left
- KHL team Former teams: HC Sochi; Ak Bars Kazan; Admiral Vladivostok; Amur Khabarovsk; HC Ugra; Sibir Novosibirsk
- Playing career: 2012–present

Konstantin Sokolov (born May 12, 1991) is a Russian professional ice hockey forward currently playing with HC Sochi of the Kontinental Hockey League (KHL). Sokolov previously played with Admiral Vladivostok of the KHL during the 2012–13 season.
