= Vitaly Shulakov =

Russian ice hockey player

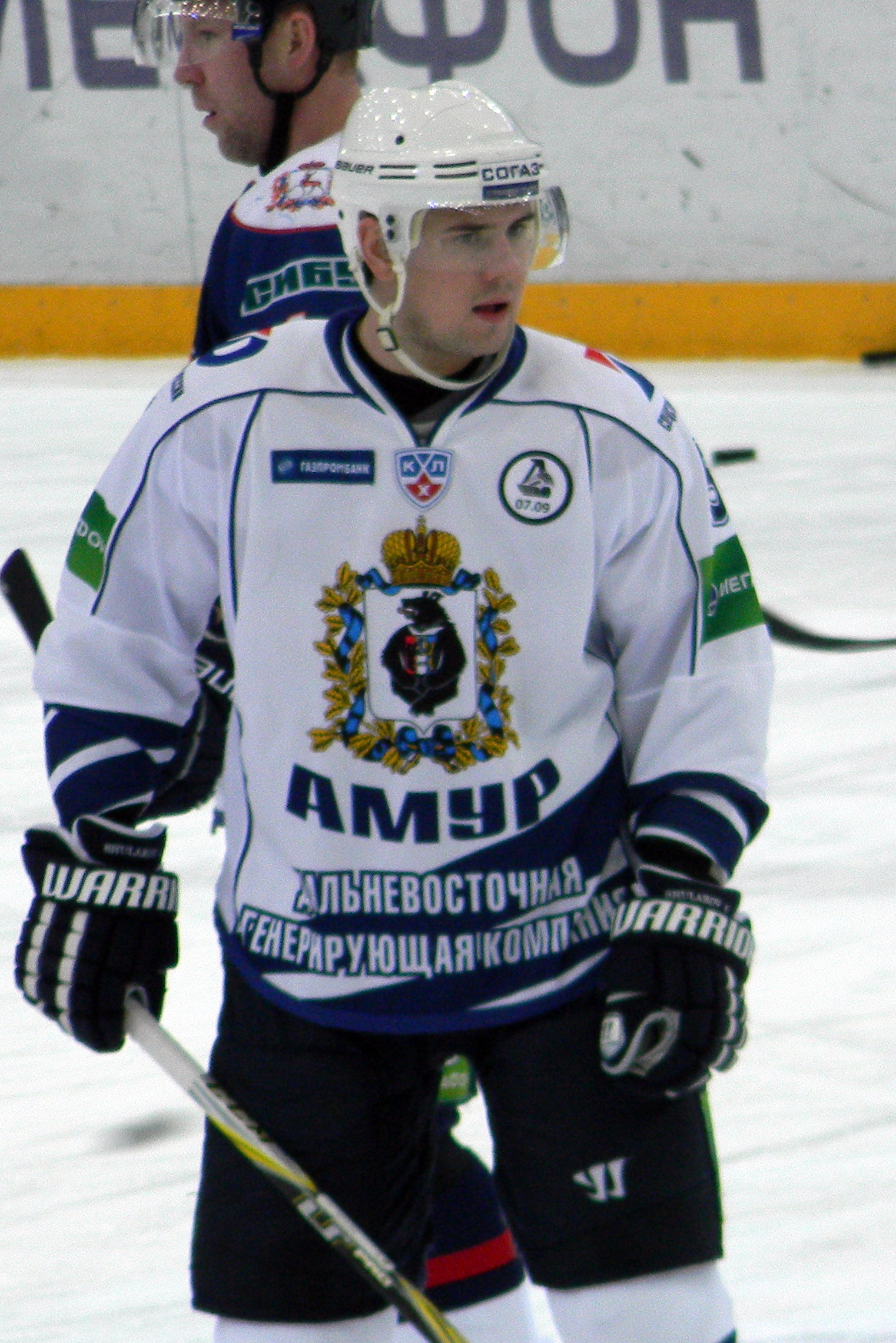
- Born: May 9, 1983 (age 43) Angarsk, Russian SFSR
- Height: 6 ft 0 in (183 cm)
- Weight: 190 lb (86 kg; 13 st 8 lb)
- Position: Defence
- Shoots: Left
- LHL team Former teams: Olimp Riga; Amur Khabarovsk; Spartak Moscow; Salavat Yulaev Ufa; Neftekhimik Nizhnekamsk; HC Lada Togliatti; HC Yugra
- Playing career: 1997–present

Vitaly Shulakov (born May 9, 1983) is a Russian professional ice hockey defenceman who currently plays for Olimp Riga in the Latvian Hockey League (LHL). He last played in the Kontinental Hockey League (KHL) with the now VHL club, HC Yugra. He first played in the top Russian tier with Amur Khabarovsk in 2004.
