= Aleksandr Osipov (ice hockey) =

Russian ice hockey player (born 1989)

Alexander Osipov
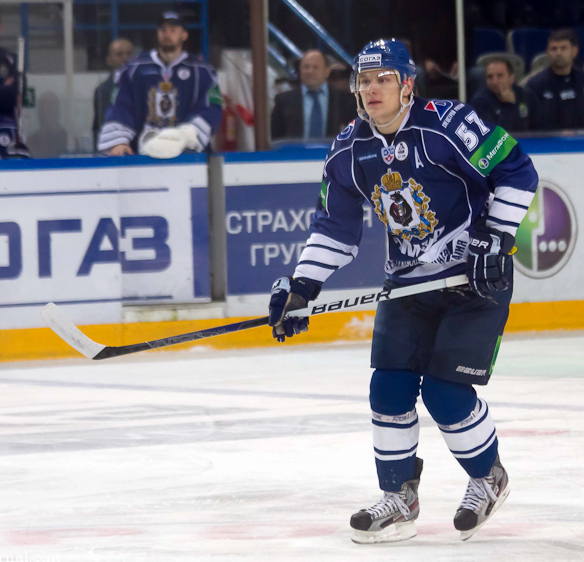
- Born: March 24, 1989 (age 37) Nizhny Tagil, Russian SFSR, Soviet Union
- Height: 6 ft 1 in (185 cm)
- Weight: 198 lb (90 kg; 14 st 2 lb)
- Position: Defence
- Shoots: Right
- VHL team Former teams: Rubin Tyumen; Amur Khabarovsk; Atlant Moscow Oblast; SKA Saint Petersburg; Ak Bars Kazan; Dynamo Moscow; Avangard Omsk; Spartak Moscow; Admiral Vladivostok; Neftekhimik Nizhnekamsk
- Playing career: 2007–present

Alexander Sergeyevich Osipov (born March 24, 1989) is a Russian professional ice hockey defenceman currently playing for Rubin Tyumen in the Supreme Hockey League (VHL).

== Career ==
In the 2014–15 season, after playing one game with Ak Bars Kazan, Osipov was traded to Dynamo Moscow for financial compensation on September 24, 2014.

On 17 July 2019, Osipov was mutually released from the remaining year of his contract with HC Spartak Moscow.
