= Dmitri Kostromitin =

Russian ice hockey player

- Born: 22 January 1990 (age 36) Chelyabinsk, Russia
- Height: 6 ft 3 in (191 cm)
- Weight: 201 lb (91 kg; 14 st 5 lb)
- Position: Defence
- Shot: Left
- Played for: Traktor Chelyabinsk; Admiral Vladivostok; HC Vityaz; Lada Togliatti; Herning Blue Fox; Yermak Angarsk; Cracovia Kraków; HC Neman Grodno; HC '05 Banská Bystrica; Arlan Kokshetau
- NHL draft: Undrafted
- Playing career: 2011–2023

Dmitri Yuriyevich Kostromitin (Russian: Дмитрий Юрьевич Костромитин; born 22 January 1990) is a Russian former professional ice hockey defenceman.

Kostromitin made his Kontinental Hockey League debut playing with Admiral Vladivostok during the 2013–14 season.

== Career statistics ==
=== Regular season and playoffs ===
			Regular season					Playoffs
Season	Team	League	GP	G	A	Pts	PIM	GP	G	A	Pts	PIM
2006–07	Traktor Chelyabinsk-2	Russia3	14	3	0	3	22	—	—	—	—	—
2007–08	Traktor Chelyabinsk-2	Russia3	23	1	2	3	26	—	—	—	—	—
2007–08	Mechel Chelyabinsk-2	Russia3	8	1	1	2	12	—	—	—	—	—
2008–09	Montreal Junior Hockey Club	QMJHL	51	7	21	28	30	—	—	—	—	—
2009–10	Rouyn-Noranda Huskies	QMJHL	58	16	23	39	46	11	2	10	12	2
2010–11	Belye Medvedi	MHL	48	6	23	29	72	5	1	0	1	0
2011–12	Mechel Chelyabinsk	VHL	47	5	13	18	67	10	0	1	1	2
2011–12	Belye Medvedi	MHL	6	0	1	1	4	—	—	—	—	—
2012–13	Chelmet Chelyabinsk	VHL	32	5	13	18	38	—	—	—	—	—
2013–14	Admiral Vladivostok	KHL	23	0	0	0	4	1	0	0	0	0
2014–15	Traktor Chelyabinsk	KHL	4	0	0	0	0	—	—	—	—	—
2014–15	Chelmet Chelyabinsk	VHL	29	1	6	7	14	6	0	2	2	8
2015–16	HC Vityaz Podolsk	KHL	47	2	8	10	54	—	—	—	—	—
2016–17	HC Lada Togliatti	KHL	43	2	4	6	33	—	—	—	—	—
2017–18	HC Lada Togliatti	KHL	44	1	4	5	18	—	—	—	—	—
2018–19	HC Lada Togliatti	VHL	35	3	3	6	33	—	—	—	—	—
2019–20	Herning Blue Fox	Denmark	44	2	11	13	18	—	—	—	—	—
2020–21	Yermak Angarsk	VHL	38	5	5	10	31	—	—	—	—	—
2020–21	Cracovia Krakow	Poland	2	0	0	0	0	17	2	3	5	4
2021–22	HC Neman Grodno	Belarus	10	0	5	5	4	—	—	—	—	—
2021–22	HC Banska Bystrica	Slovak	29	0	1	1	43	6	0	1	1	6
2022–23	Arlan Kokshetau	Kazakhstan	31	1	12	13	18	2	0	0	0	0
KHL totals			161	5	16	21	109	1	0	0	0	0
VHL totals			181	19	40	59	183	16	0	3	3	10
