= Enver Lisin =

Russian ice hockey player

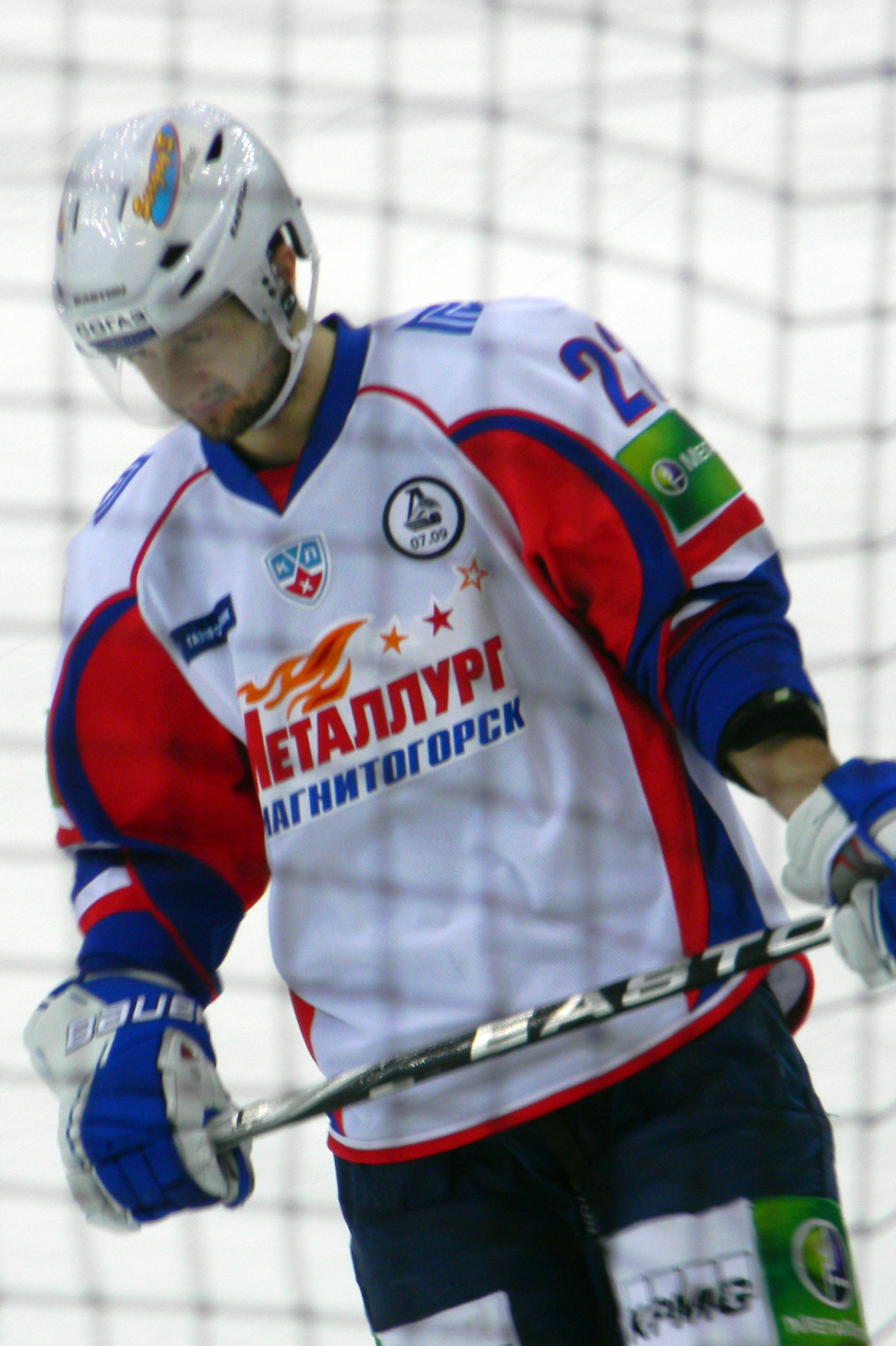
- Born: April 22, 1986 (age 40) Voskresensk, Russian SFSR, Soviet Union
- Height: 6 ft 2 in (188 cm)
- Weight: 200 lb (91 kg; 14 st 4 lb)
- Position: Right wing
- Shot: Left
- Played for: Ak Bars Kazan; Phoenix Coyotes; New York Rangers; Metallurg Magnitogorsk; Admiral Vladivostok; CSKA Moscow; Salavat Yulaev Ufa; Sibir Novosibirsk; Spartak Moscow; Traktor Chelyabinsk
- National team: Russia
- NHL draft: 50th overall, 2004; Phoenix Coyotes
- Playing career: 2003–2020

Enver Gennadievich Lisin (Russian: Э́нвер Генна́дьевич Ли́син; born April 22, 1986) is a Russian former professional ice hockey forward. He played in the National Hockey League (NHL) and the Kontinental Hockey League (KHL). He was Russian champion in 2006 and won European champion's cup in 2007. Lisin was drafted 50th overall in the 2004 NHL entry draft by the Phoenix Coyotes.

== Playing career ==
As a boy, Lisin played in the 2000 Quebec International Pee-Wee Hockey Tournament with the HC CSKA Moscow youth team.

Known for being a very fast skater, Lisin played two seasons in the top tier Russian Superleague before opting to pursue his North American career with the Coyotes. His nickname in the Phoenix Coyotes locker room was Webster.

Lisin was traded to the New York Rangers from the Coyotes in exchange for Lauri Korpikoski on July 13, 2009. He became an unrestricted free agent on July 1, 2010, when the Rangers declined to make him a qualifying offer. With limited NHL interest he decided to continue his career in his native Russia joining Metallurg Magnitogorsk of the KHL on October 4, 2010.

After stints with Admiral Vladivostok and CSKA Moscow, Lisin signed a two-year contract as a free agent with Salavat Yulaev Ufa on May 1, 2015.

Lisin played three seasons with Ufa, before beginning the 2018–19 season with HC Sibir Novosibirsk. He registered 4 assists in 10 games before he left to sign for the remainder of the season with Spartak Moscow on October 10, 2018.

On May 1, 2019, as a free agent from Spartak, Lisin signed a one-year KHL contract with Traktor Chelyabinsk.

== Career statistics ==
=== Regular season and playoffs ===
			Regular season					Playoffs
Season	Team	League	GP	G	A	Pts	PIM	GP	G	A	Pts	PIM
2001–02	Dynamo–2 Moscow	RUS-3	6	3	0	3	14	—	—	—	—	—
2002–03	Dynamo–2 Moscow	RUS-3	18	2	4	6	6	—	—	—	—	—
2003–04	Dynamo–2 Moscow	RUS-3	17	8	7	15	30	—	—	—	—	—
2003–04	Kristall Saratov	RUS-2	35	10	6	16	30	4	1	0	1	0
2004–05	Ak Bars Kazan	RSL	53	8	4	12	4	4	0	0	0	0
2004–05	Ak Bars–2 Kazan	RUS-3	4	4	3	7	2	—	—	—	—	—
2005–06	Ak Bars Kazan	RSL	43	7	5	12	26	13	3	1	4	6
2006–07	San Antonio Rampage	AHL	2	2	0	2	4	—	—	—	—	—
2006–07	Phoenix Coyotes	NHL	17	1	1	2	16	—	—	—	—	—
2006–07	Ak Bars Kazan	RSL	20	6	2	8	18	1	0	0	0	0
2006–07	Ak Bars–2 Kazan	RUS-3	2	3	1	4	0	—	—	—	—	—
2007–08	Phoenix Coyotes	NHL	13	4	1	5	6	—	—	—	—	—
2007–08	San Antonio Rampage	AHL	58	16	19	35	26	6	1	2	3	0
2008–09	San Antonio Rampage	AHL	10	2	4	6	6	—	—	—	—	—
2008–09	Phoenix Coyotes	NHL	48	13	8	21	24	—	—	—	—	—
2009–10	New York Rangers	NHL	57	6	8	14	18	—	—	—	—	—
2010–11	Metallurg Magnitogorsk	KHL	44	12	13	25	44	15	2	5	7	18
2011–12	Metallurg Magnitogorsk	KHL	42	7	7	14	22	1	0	1	1	0
2012–13	Metallurg Magnitogorsk	KHL	47	11	7	18	32	7	0	3	3	12
2013–14	Admiral Vladivostok	KHL	28	7	11	18	12	—	—	—	—	—
2013–14	CSKA Moscow	KHL	14	0	2	2	4	4	0	2	2	0
2014–15	Admiral Vladivostok	KHL	54	16	16	32	41	—	—	—	—	—
2015–16	Salavat Yulaev Ufa	KHL	52	5	9	14	30	19	1	6	7	14
2016–17	Salavat Yulaev Ufa	KHL	55	14	16	30	64	5	2	1	3	4
2017–18	Salavat Yulaev Ufa	KHL	54	14	10	24	30	13	1	2	3	12
2018–19	Sibir Novosibirsk	KHL	10	0	4	4	4	—	—	—	—	—
2018–19	Spartak Moscow	KHL	28	2	4	6	16	6	1	0	1	0
2019–20	Traktor Chelyabinsk	KHL	5	2	0	2	0	—	—	—	—	—
RSL totals			116	21	11	32	48	17	3	1	4	6
NHL totals			135	24	18	42	64	—	—	—	—	—
KHL totals			433	90	99	189	299	70	7	20	27	60

=== International ===
Year	Team	Event	GP	G	A	Pts	PIM
2003	Russia	U18	5	1	1	2	0
2004	Russia	WJC18	6	1	0	1	12
2005	Russia	WJC	6	2	3	5	0
2006	Russia	WJC	6	2	0	2	2
Junior totals			23	6	4	10	14
