= Dmitri Lugin =

Russian ice hockey player

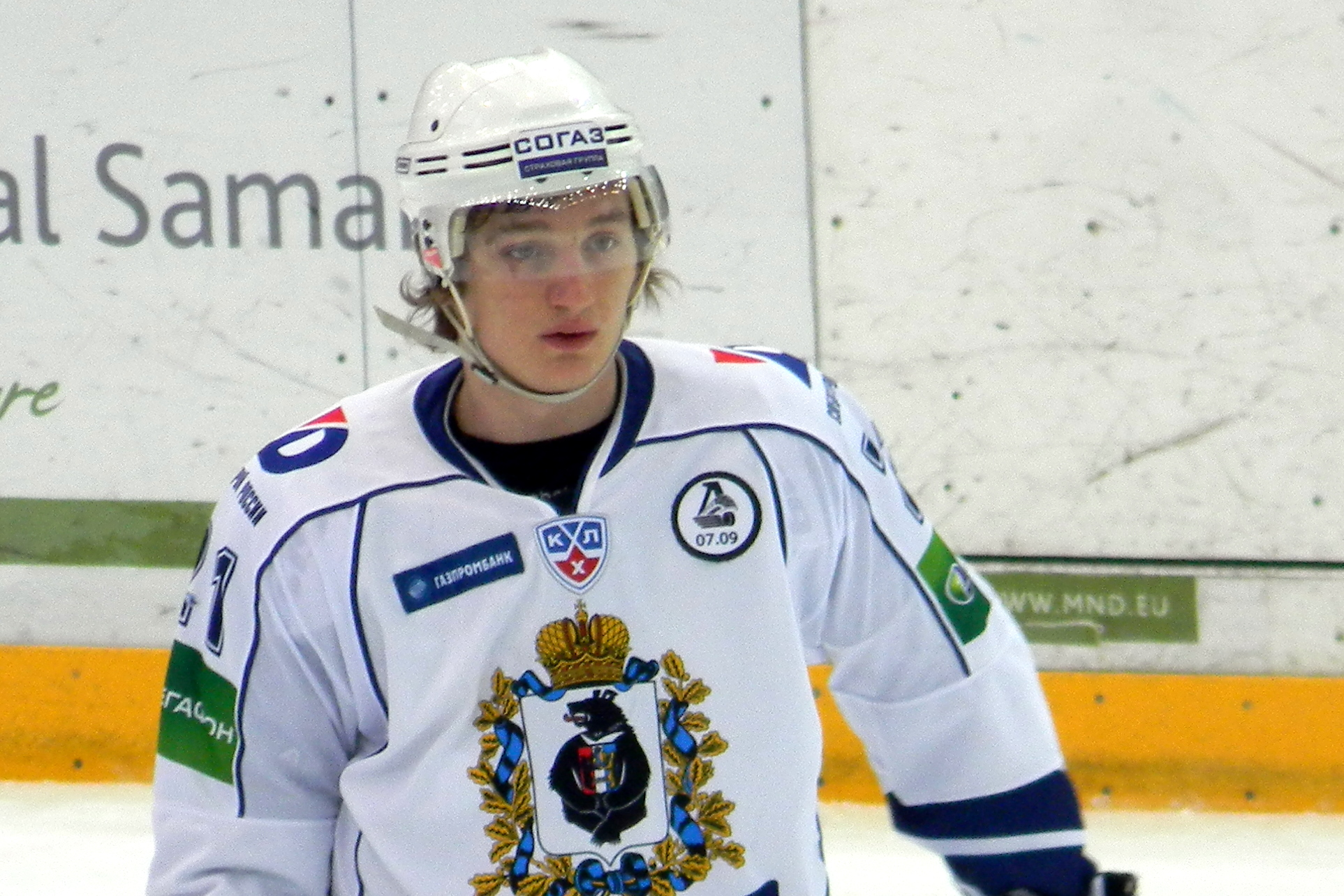
- Born: April 1, 1990 (age 36) Khabarovsk, USSR
- Height: 6 ft 0 in (183 cm)
- Weight: 194 lb (88 kg; 13 st 12 lb)
- Position: Right wing
- Shot: Right
- Played for: Dynamo Moscow; Amur Khabarovsk; Admiral Vladivostok; Lokomotiv Yaroslavl; HC Sochi; HC Vityaz
- NHL draft: Undrafted
- Playing career: 2008–2022

Dmitri Evgenievich Lugin (Russian: Дмитрий Евгеньевич Лугин; born April 1, 1990) is a Russian former professional ice hockey winger who most notably played in the Kontinental Hockey League (KHL). He won the rookie of the year award in the 2011–12 KHL season while with Amur Khabarovsk.
