= Igor Bortnikov =

Russian professional ice hockey forward

- Born: June 8, 1989 (age 35); Leninogorsk, Russian SFSR
- Height: 6 ft 0 in (183 cm)
- Weight: 190 lb (86 kg; 13 st 8 lb)
- Position: Forward
- Shoots: Left
- VHL team Former teams: Neftyanik Almetievsk; Neftekhimik Nizhnekamsk; Admiral Vladivostok; HC Yugra
- Playing career: 2008–present

Igor Bortnikov (born June 8, 1989) is a Russian professional ice hockey forward who currently plays for Neftyanik Almetievsk of the Supreme Hockey League (VHL). He first played in the Kontinental Hockey League with his original youth club, HC Neftekhimik Nizhnekamsk.
