= Vladimir Pervushin =

Russian ice hockey player

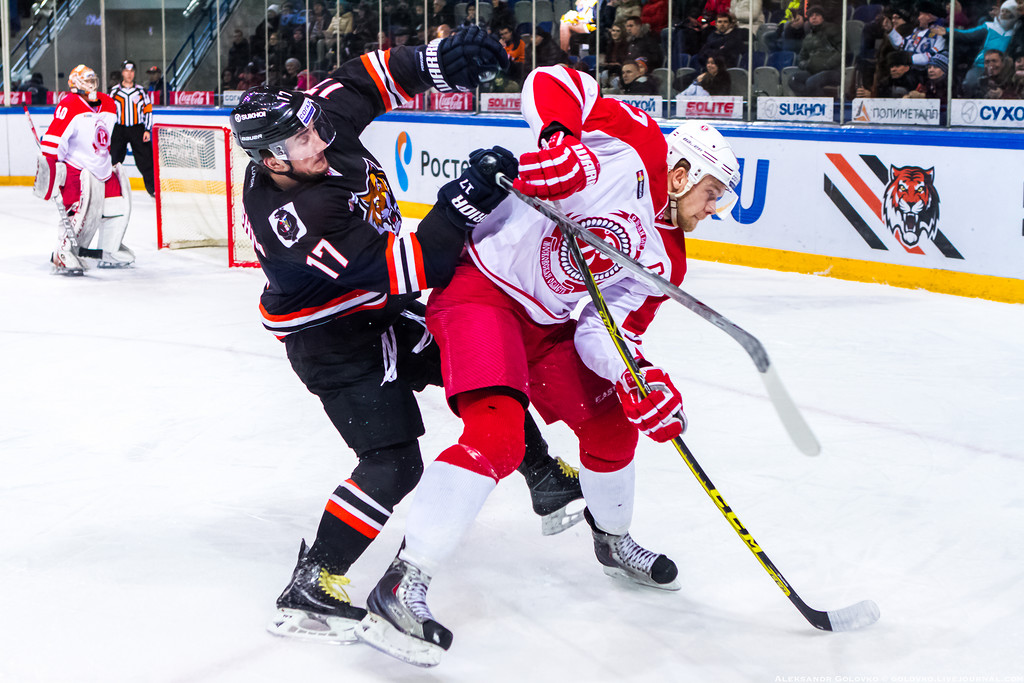
- Born: March 25, 1986 (age 38); Omsk, Russia
- Height: 6 ft 0 in (183 cm)
- Weight: 216 lb (98 kg; 15 st 6 lb)
- Position: Forward
- Shot: Left
- Played for: Avangard Omsk; Admiral Vladivostok; HC Yugra; Amur Khabarovsk; Sibir Novosibirsk
- Playing career: 2003–2020

Vladimir Pervushin (born March 25, 1986) is a Russian former professional ice hockey forward who last played for HC Sibir Novosibirsk of the Kontinental Hockey League (KHL). He had previously played with hometown club, Avangard Omsk of the KHL.
