= Alexei Yefimov =

Russian ice hockey player

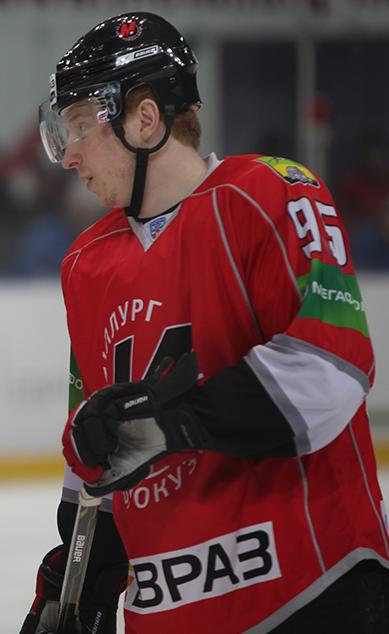
- Yefimov with Metallurg Novokuznetsk in 2013
- Born: February 15, 1988 (age 37) Moscow, Russia
- Height: 6 ft 2 in (188 cm)
- Weight: 223 lb (101 kg; 15 st 13 lb)
- Position: Left wing
- Shoots: Right
- KHL team Former teams: Avtomobilist Yekaterinburg; Krylya Sovetov Moscow; Metallurg Novokuznetsk
- NHL draft: Undrafted
- Playing career: 2006–present

Alexei Aleksandrovich Yefimov (Russian: Алексей Александрович Ефимов; born 15 February 1988) is a Russian professional ice hockey player. He is currently playing with Avtomobilist Yekaterinburg of the Kontinental Hockey League (KHL)

Yefimov made his Kontinental Hockey League debut playing with Metallurg Novokuznetsk during the 2012–13 KHL season.
