= Viktor Drugov =

Russian ice hockey player (born 1986)

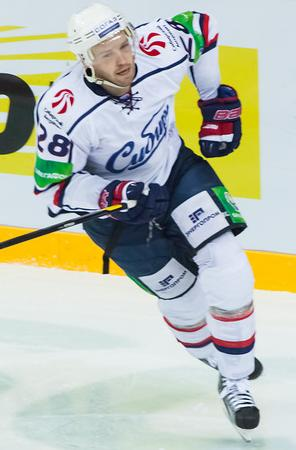
- Born: May 12, 1986 (age 38); Barnaul, Russian SFSR, USSR
- Height: 6 ft 0 in (183 cm)
- Weight: 179 lb (81 kg; 12 st 11 lb)
- Position: Left wing
- Shoots: Left
- VHL team Former teams: HC Tambov; Traktor Chelyabinsk; HC Lada Togliatti; Atlant Moscow Oblast; HC Sibir Novosibirsk; Torpedo Nizhny Novgorod; Metallurg Novokuznetsk; HC Vityaz; Admiral Vladivostok
- Playing career: 2002–present

Viktor Drugov (born May 12, 1986) is a Russian professional ice hockey winger who currently plays for HC Tambov in the Supreme Hockey League (VHL). He joined Tambov after previously playing with Admiral Vladivostok of the Kontinental Hockey League (KHL).
