= Evgeny Ivannikov =

Russian ice hockey player

- Born: April 29, 1991 (age 35) St. Petersburg, Russia
- Height: 1.81 m (5 ft 11 in)
- Weight: 82 kg (181 lb; 12 st 13 lb)
- Position: Goaltender
- Catches: Left
- team Former teams: Free agent Admiral Vladivostok; SKA Saint Petersburg; Lada Togliatti; Spartak Moscow; HC Yugra; Neftekhimik Nizhnekamsk; MHk 32 Liptovský Mikuláš
- Playing career: 2011–present

Evgeny Ivannikov (Russian: Евгений Иванников; born April 29, 1991, in St. Petersburg) is a Russian professional ice hockey goaltender. He is currently a free agent.

== Playing career ==
Ivannikov made his Kontinental Hockey League debut playing with Admiral Vladivostok during the 2013–14 season. On May 9, 2018, four days after being previously re-acquired by SKA Saint Petersburg, Ivannikov was traded on to HC Yugra in exchange for Nikita Zorkin.

Following two seasons in the Supreme Hockey League (VHL) with HC Yugra, Ivannikov made a return to the KHL after agreeing to a one-year contract with Neftekhimik Nizhnekamsk on 14 July 2020.
