= 2011–12 KHL season =

- League: Kontinental Hockey League
- Sport: Ice hockey
- Duration: 12 September 2011 – 25 April 2012
- Teams: 23

Regular season
- Continental Cup winner: (Russia) Traktor Chelyabinsk
- Season MVP: (Russia) Alexander Radulov
- Top scorer: (Russia) Alexander Radulov

Playoffs
- Western champions: (Russia) Dynamo Moscow
- Western runners-up: (Russia) SKA Saint Petersburg
- Eastern champions: (Russia) Avangard Omsk
- Eastern runners-up: (Russia) Traktor Chelyabinsk

Gagarin Cup
- Champions: (Russia) Dynamo Moscow
- Runners-up: (Russia) Avangard Omsk
- Finals MVP: (Russia) Alexander Eremenko; Dynamo Moscow

KHL seasons
- ← 2010–11 2012–13 →

The 2011–12 KHL season was the fourth season of the Kontinental Hockey League. The regular season began with the Opening Cup game on 7 September 2011, but because of the 2011 Lokomotiv Yaroslavl plane crash, which occurred during the first period of the Cup game and killed all but one member of the Lokomotiv Yaroslavl team, further play was delayed until 12 September 2011. The tragedy forced Lokomotiv Yaroslavl to cancel their participation in the KHL season. The Opening Cup was renamed the Lokomotiv Cup in honor of those lost in the tragedy. The regular season ended on 26 February 2012 and the following playoffs ended on 25 April.

The Gagarin Cup was won by Dynamo Moscow, defeating Avangard Omsk in a seven-game final series. Dynamo Moscow is the first champion from the Western Conference of the KHL.

== League changes ==
=== Team changes ===
Expansion to Slovakia

With the admission of Lev Poprad from Poprad, Slovakia the league expanded beyond the borders of the former Soviet Union. This brought the number of teams to 24. However, following the Lokomotiv Yaroslavl plane crash that claimed the lives of the entire Lokomotiv Yaroslavl squad (with the exceptions of forward Maxim Zyuzyakin and goaltending coach Jorma Valtonen), Lokomotiv withdrew from the season, leaving only 23 teams as in the previous season.

== Regular season ==
The regular season was supposed to start on 7 September 2011 with the Opening Cup and end on 26 February 2012 with short breaks in November, December and February for international matches and for the all-star game. However, after the Yaroslavl plane tragedy, the schedule had to be modified: the start of the season was postponed to 12 September and the number of games for each team was reduced to 54 as in the previous season, when also only 23 teams participated.

=== Notable events ===
==== Yaroslavl plane tragedy ====
On 7 September 2011, the day of the season opening, a tragic airplane accident occurred in Yaroslavl in which the Lokomotiv Yaroslavl team was killed. After the news broke in Ufa, where the Opening Cup game between Salavat Yulaev Ufa and Atlant Moscow Oblast was already underway, the match was abandoned. Later, the KHL announced that the start of the season would be postponed to 12 September, and that pre-game ceremonies would be held to honour the Lokomotiv team, while arena entertainment would be cancelled. On 10 September, at Lokomotiv's public memorial service team president Yuri Yakovlev announced that they would not participate in the 2011–12 KHL season.

==== All-star game ====
The All-star weekend took place on 20–21 January 2012 in Riga, Latvia. Team Fedorov defeated Team Ozoliņš with 15–11.

=== League standings ===
Source: KHL.ru

Points are awarded as follows:

- 3 Points for a win in regulation ("W")
- 2 Points for a win in overtime ("OTW") or a penalty shootout ("SOW")
- 1 Point for a loss in overtime ("OTL") or a penalty shootout ("SOL")
- 0 Points for a loss in regulation ("L")

The conference standings determined the seedings for the play-offs. The first two places in each conference are reserved for the division winners.

Note: Bolded teams qualified for the playoffs.

==== Western Conference ====
R		Div	GP	W	OTW	SOW	SOL	OTL	L	GF	GA	Pts
**1**	**z –** **SKA Saint Petersburg**	**BOB**	**54**	**32**	**1**	**5**	**3**	**2**	**11**	**205**	**130**	113
**2**	**y –** **Torpedo Nizhny Novgorod**	**TAR**	**54**	**24**	**0**	**6**	**5**	**2**	**17**	**157**	**132**	91
**3**	**Dynamo Moscow**	**BOB**	**54**	**31**	**1**	**3**	**3**	**1**	**15**	**144**	**116**	105
**4**	**Atlant Moscow Oblast**	**TAR**	**54**	**20**	**4**	**7**	**4**	**0**	**19**	**130**	**134**	86
**5**	**Severstal Cherepovets**	**TAR**	**54**	**23**	**0**	**5**	**4**	**2**	**20**	**142**	**133**	85
**6**	**Dinamo Minsk**	**TAR**	**54**	**21**	**0**	**7**	**3**	**3**	**20**	**158**	**148**	83
**7**	**Dinamo Riga**	**BOB**	**54**	**20**	**2**	**4**	**7**	**0**	**21**	**129**	**136**	79
**8**	**CSKA Moscow**	**BOB**	**54**	**19**	**3**	**0**	**7**	**0**	**25**	**119**	**129**	70
9	Spartak Moscow	BOB	54	15	2	5	3	2	27	124	163	64
10	Lev Poprad	BOB	54	13	0	3	5	4	29	125	162	54
11	Vityaz Chekhov	TAR	54	10	1	5	1	1	36	108	193	44
	Lokomotiv Yaroslavl	Withdrew due to the 2011 Lokomotiv Yaroslavl plane crash										

y – Won division; z – Won conference (and division);
BOB - Bobrov Division, TAR - Tarasov Division

Source: khl.ru

==== Eastern Conference ====
R		Div	GP	W	OTW	SOW	SOL	OTL	L	GF	GA	Pts
**1**	**c –** **Traktor Chelyabinsk**	**KHA**	**54**	**32**	**2**	**5**	**4**	**0**	**11**	**163**	**116**	114
**2**	**y –** **Avangard Omsk**	**CHE**	**54**	**26**	**0**	**5**	**4**	**1**	**18**	**133**	**115**	93
**3**	**Metallurg Magnitogorsk**	**KHA**	**54**	**29**	**1**	**1**	**1**	**2**	**20**	**150**	**137**	94
**4**	**Ak Bars Kazan**	**KHA**	**54**	**27**	**1**	**2**	**4**	**1**	**19**	**167**	**136**	92
**5**	**Salavat Yulaev Ufa**	**CHE**	**54**	**23**	**3**	**4**	**5**	**1**	**18**	**173**	**152**	89
**6**	**Barys Astana**	**CHE**	**54**	**25**	**2**	**1**	**3**	**1**	**22**	**160**	**160**	85
**7**	**Amur Khabarovsk**	**CHE**	**54**	**23**	**1**	**4**	**3**	**2**	**21**	**166**	**139**	84
**8**	**Yugra Khanty-Mansiysk**	**KHA**	**54**	**19**	**1**	**9**	**3**	**3**	**19**	**139**	**134**	83
9	Metallurg Novokuznetsk	CHE	54	18	2	4	9	0	21	108	130	75
10	Neftekhimik Nizhnekamsk	KHA	54	20	2	3	3	1	25	142	165	74
11	Sibir Novosibirsk	CHE	54	12	2	4	7	2	27	132	154	57
12	Avtomobilist Yekaterinburg	KHA	54	9	3	4	5	3	30	105	165	49

y – Won division; c – Won Continental Cup (best record in KHL);
CHE - Chernyshev Division, KHA - Kharlamov Division

Source: khl.ru

=== Player statistics ===
==== Scoring leaders ====
Updated as of the end of the regular season. Source: khl.ru

GP = Games played; G = Goals; A = Assists; Pts = Points; +/– = P Plus–minus; PIM = Penalty minutes

Player	Team	GP	G	A	Pts	+/–	PIM
Alexander Radulov	Salavat Yulaev Ufa	50	25	38	63	+1	64
Tony Mårtensson	SKA Saint Petersburg	54	22	37	59	+35	10
Vadim Schipachev	Severstal Cherepovets	54	22	37	59	+16	26
Brandon Bochenski	Barys Astana	49	27	31	58	+4	26
Kevin Dallman	Barys Astana	53	18	36	54	+15	33
Jakub Petružálek	Amur Khabarovsk	54	22	29	51	+14	16
Aleksey Morozov	Ak Bars Kazan	53	21	29	50	+10	24
Sergei Shirokov	CSKA Moscow	53	18	30	48	+7	26
Vladimir Tarasenko	SKA Saint Petersburg	54	23	24	47	+18	15
Petr Vrána	Amur Khabarovsk	46	20	25	45	+18	12

==== Leading goaltenders ====
Updated as of the end of the regular season. Source: khl.ru

GP = Games played; Min = Minutes played; W = Wins; L = Losses; SOL = Shootout losses; GA = Goals against; SO = Shutouts; SV% = Save percentage; GAA = Goals against average

Player	Team	GP	Min	W	L	SOP	GA	SO	SV%	GAA
Vitali Koval	Torpedo Nizhny Novgorod	30	1612:04	15	9	6	47	4	.930	**1.75**
Alexander Eremenko	Dynamo Moscow	35	1975:20	18	9	5	63	6	.920	**1.91**
Karri Rämö	Avangard Omsk	45	2666:48	19	17	9	87	5	.925	**1.96**
Michael Garnett	Traktor Chelyabinsk	45	2674:37	29	10	6	88	3	.922	**1.97**
Rastislav Staňa	CSKA Moscow	46	2646:42	20	19	4	91	2	.926	**2.06**

== Playoffs ==
The playoffs started on 29 February 2012 with the top eight teams from both conferences and ended on 25 April with the seventh game of the Gagarin Cup final.

Conference Quarterfinals	Conference Semifinals
1	(Russia) Traktor	4
8	(Russia) Yugra	1
1	(Russia) Traktor	4
4	(Russia) Ak Bars	2
2	(Russia) Avangard	4
7	(Russia) Amur	0
Eastern Conference
3	(Russia) Metallurg Mg	4
6	(Kazakhstan) Barys	3
2	(Russia) Avangard	4
3	(Russia) Metallurg Mg	1
4	(Russia) Ak Bars	4
5	(Russia) Salavat Yulaev	2
1	(Russia) SKA	4
8	(Russia) CSKA	1
1	(Russia) SKA	4
4	(Russia) Atlant	2
2	(Russia) Torpedo	4
7	(Latvia) Dinamo Rg	3
Western Conference
3	(Russia) Dynamo Msk	4
6	(Belarus) Dinamo Mn	0
2	(Russia) Torpedo	2
3	(Russia) Dynamo Msk	4
4	(Russia) Atlant	4
5	(Russia) Severstal	2

Conference Finals
1	(Russia) Traktor	1
2	(Russia) Avangard	4
1	(Russia) SKA	0
3	(Russia) Dynamo Msk	4

Gagarin Cup Finals
2	(Russia) Avangard	3
3	(Russia) Dynamo Msk	4

=== Player statistics ===
==== Playoff scoring leaders ====
The following players lead the league in points at the conclusion of the playoffs. Source: khl.ru

GP = Games played; G = Goals; A = Assists; Pts = Points; +/– = P Plus–minus; PIM = Penalty minutes

Player	Team	GP	G	A	Pts	+/–	PIM
Roman Červenka	Avangard Omsk	20	11	10	21	+6	4
Konstantin Gorovikov	Dynamo Moscow	21	6	14	20	+7	16
Mikhail Anisin	Dynamo Moscow	21	14	5	19	+7	2
Vladimir Tarasenko	SKA Saint Petersburg	15	10	6	16	+10	6
Marek Kvapil	Dynamo Moscow	21	8	4	12	+8	4
Alexander Perezhogin	Avangard Omsk	21	8	4	12	+6	8

==== Playoff leading goaltenders ====
The following players lead the league in points at the conclusion of the playoffs. Source: khl.ru

GP = Games played; Min = Minutes played; W = Wins; L = Losses; SOL = Shootout losses; GA = Goals against; SO = Shutouts; SV% = Save percentage; GAA = Goals against average

Player	Team	GP	Min	W	L	SOP	GA	SO	SV%	GAA
Vasiliy Koshechkin	Severstal Cherepovets	6	364:40	2	4	0	8	1	.958	1.32
Edgars Masaļskis	Yugra Khanty-Mansiysk	3	88:23	0	2	0	2	0	.958	1.36
Karri Rämö	Avangard Omsk	21	1209:08	14	6	0	31	3	.940	1.54
Alexander Eremenko	Dynamo Moscow	21	1304:23	16	5	0	34	3	.943	1.56
Michael Garnett	Traktor Chelyabinsk	16	988:48	8	7	0	29	1	.935	1.76
Jakub Štěpánek	SKA Saint Petersburg	13	750:33	7	6	0	22	3	.924	1.76

== Final standings ==
Rank	Team
1	(Russia) Dynamo Moscow
2	(Russia) Avangard Omsk
3	(Russia) Traktor Chelyabinsk
4	(Russia) SKA Saint Petersburg
5	(Russia) Metallurg Magnitogorsk
6	(Russia) Ak Bars Kazan
7	(Russia) Torpedo Nizhny Novgorod
8	(Russia) Atlant Moscow Oblast
9	(Russia) Salavat Yulaev Ufa
10	(Kazakhstan) Barys Astana
11	(Russia) Severstal Cherepovets
12	(Russia) Amur Khabarovsk
13	(Belarus) Dinamo Minsk
14	(Russia) Yugra Khanty-Mansiysk
15	(Latvia) Dinamo Riga
16	(Russia) CSKA Moscow
17	(Russia) Metallurg Novokuznetsk
18	(Russia) Neftekhimik Nizhnekamsk
19	(Russia) Spartak Moscow
20	(Russia) Sibir Novosibirsk
21	(Slovakia) Lev Poprad
22	(Russia) Avtomobilist Yekaterinburg
23	(Russia) Vityaz Chekhov

== Awards ==
=== Players of the Month ===
Best KHL players of each month.

Month	Goaltender	Defense	Forward	Rookie
September	(Czech Republic) Jakub Štěpánek (SKA)	(Russia) Aleksandr Osipov (Amur)	(Russia) Vadim Schipachev (Severstal)	(Russia) Andrei Sergeev (CSKA)
October	(Canada) Michael Garnett (Traktor)	(Russia) Vitaly Shulakov (Amur)	(Russia) Vladimir Tarasenko (Sibir)	(Russia) Nikita Tochitsky (Vityaz)
November	(Canada) Michael Garnett (Traktor)	(Russia) Alex Riazantsev (Traktor)	(Russia) Vadim Schipachev (Severstal)	(Russia) Sergei Barbashev (CSKA)
December	(Finland) Ari Ahonen (Metallurg Mg)	(Russia) Yevgeny Medvedev (Ak Bars)	(Russia) Alexander Radulov (Salavat Yulaev)	(Russia) Dmitry Lugin (Amur)
January	(Finland) Teemu Lassila (Metallurg Nk)	(Canada) Kevin Dallman (Barys)	(Russia) Evgeny Kuznetsov (Traktor)	(Russia) Stanislav Bocharov (Yugra)
February	(Russia) Alexander Eremenko (Dynamo Msc)	(Latvia) Guntis Galviņš (Riga)	(Sweden) Robert Nilsson (Torpedo)	(Russia) Roman Tatalin (Vityaz)
March	(Canada) Michael Garnett (Traktor)	(Russia) Ilya Gorokhov (Dyn. Moscow)	(Russia) Vladimir Tarasenko (SKA)	not awarded
April	(Russia) Alexander Eremenko (Dynamo Msc)	(Czech Republic) Martin Škoula (Omsk)	(Russia) Mikhail Anisin (Dynamo Msc)	not awarded

=== KHL Awards ===
On 23 May 2012, the KHL held their annual award ceremony. A total of 20 different awards were handed out to teams, players, officials and media. The most important trophies are listed in the table below.

Golden Stick Award (regular season MVP)	(Russia) Alexander Radulov (Ufa)
Best coach	(Latvia) Oļegs Znaroks (Dynamo Msc)
Alexei Cherepanov Award (best rookie)	(Russia) Dmitry Lugin (Khabarovsk)

The league also awarded six "Golden Helmets" for the members of the all-star team:

Forwards	(Russia) Alexander Radulov; Salavat Yulaev Ufa	(Czech Republic) Roman Červenka; Avangard Omsk	(Russia) Mikhail Anisin; Dynamo Moscow
Defense	(Russia) Dmitri Kalinin; SKA Saint Petersburg		(Canada) Kevin Dallman; Barys Astana
Goalie	(Russia) Alexander Eremenko; Dynamo Moscow		
