= Admiral Vladivostok =

Ice hockey club in Vladivostok, Russia

- City: Vladivostok, Russia
- League: Kontinental Hockey League
- Conference: Eastern
- Division: Chernyshev
- Founded: 2013
- Home arena: Fetisov Arena (capacity: 7,500)
- Colours
- President: Aleksey An
- General manager: Viktor Gordiuk
- Head coach: Oleg Bratash
- Affiliates: Chelny (VHL); Taifun (MHL)
- Website: hcadmiral.pro

Franchise history
- 2013–present: Admiral Vladivostok

Hockey Club Admiral, also known as Admiral Vladivostok, (Russian: Хоккейный клуб Адмирал) is a professional ice hockey club based in Vladivostok, Russia. It is a member of the Chernyshev Division in the Kontinental Hockey League (KHL). Admiral play its home games at the Fetisov Arena.

Admiral joined the league in 2013 as an expansion team, which made them one of only two teams in the Russian Far East, along with Amur Khabarovsk. They played seven seasons in the KHL before going dormant for the 2020–21 season for financial considerations due to the COVID-19 pandemic. The team returned to the KHL for the 2021–22 season, after a one-season hiatus.

== History ==
At the request of the governor of Primorsky Krai, Vladimir Miklushevsky, the creation of the club was honored upon a member of the Federation Council of the Territory, Vyacheslav Fetisov. On 21 April 2013, it was decided that Admirals would join the Kontinental Hockey League in the 2013–14 season. Admiral's name and logo were determined by the public. The names of Admiral, Orca and "Outpost" were offered for vote, where Admiral won with 72.2% of the vote.

Admiral Vladivostok's primary logo, used from 2013 to 2020

On 17 June 2013, the KHL held its first ever league expansion draft to form the Admiral roster. The Admirals had the right to choose one of five skaters submitted by each KHL club, except foreign clubs and Lokomotiv Yaroslavl, who were rebuilding from the 2011 Lokomotiv Yaroslavl plane crash. Under the terms of the draft, Admiral were allowed to select up to 7 foreign players, including no more than one goaltender. Admiral would initially select 19 players, including a goaltender.

On 27 July 2013, Rubin Tyumen and Admiral signed a co-operation affiliation agreement, between the KHL and the secondary tier VHL. On 1 August 2013, a vote on uniforms of the team was completed: the number 1 option won out with the public, a dark blue uniform decorated with the image of an anchor.

On 6 September 2013, Admiral Vladivostok played their first match in the KHL championship against provincial rivals Amur Khabarovsk. The first goal scored in the club's history was scored by Swedish forward Nicklas Bergfors, and the match ended in Admiral's first shootout victory with a score of 4–3. On 2 December 2013 Vladivostok fired its inaugural coach Hannu Jortikka due to a conflict with club management. Three days later Admiral announced that Sergei Svetlov, Olympic champion of 1988 with the USSR national hockey team, would assume the head coaching responsibilities.

On 7 January 2014, in a match with Severstal Cherepovets, Justin Hodgman scored the 100th goal in the club's history. In a fourth-place finish in the Chernyshev division, Admiral made the playoffs in their first season, losing in the first round for the Gagarin Cup 2–4 to Metallurg Magnitogorsk. In the off-season, on 21 May 2014, it was announced that Dusan Gregor would become the third coach in club history.

On 1 April 2020, it was reported that Admiral Vladivostok was to withdraw from the 2020–21 KHL season due to financial problems stemming from the COVID-19 pandemic. The club's main sponsor, Vladivostok sea port was adversely affected by the worldwide pandemic and could not finance the team as planned. On 31 March 2021, the KHL Board announced that Vladivostok would return to the league in time for the 2021–22 season, providing that the team pay off all of its outstanding debt before 31 July. On the beginning of payment of their debts associated to player payments in past seasons, Vladivostok were granted permission to sign players for the upcoming season. To mark their return for the 2021–22 season and signify a new chapter in the franchise, Admiral chose to rebrand their logo and colours, a first major change since their inception in 2013.

After a concerning start to pre-season and friendly matches, Admiral dismissed newly hired Sergei Vostrikov on 13 August 2021. Moving on from Vostrikov's brief tenure, Admiral turned to former head coach Alexander Andrievsky on a one-year agreement on 20 August 2021.

== Season-by-season record ==
Note: GP = Games played, W = Wins, OTW = Overtime/shootout wins, OTL = Overtime/shootout losses, L = Losses, Pts = Points, GF = Goals for, GA = Goals against

Season	GP	W	OTW	OTL	L	Pts	GF	GA	Finish	Top scorer	Playoffs
2013–14	54	21	5	5	23	78	135	129	4th, Chernyshev	Felix Schutz (38 points: 16 G, 22 A; 54 GP)	Lost in Conference Quarterfinals, 1–4 (Metallurg Magnitogorsk)
2014–15	60	20	8	4	28	80	162	172	5th, Chernyshev	Nicklas Bergfors (44 points: 21 G, 23 A; 60 GP)	Did not Qualify
2015–16	60	25	8	4	23	95	157	163	4th, Chernyshev	Konstantin Makarov (35 points: 18 G, 17 A; 55 GP)	Lost in Conference Quarterfinals, 1–4 (Sibir Novosibirsk)
2016–17	60	24	3	8	25	86	147	153	4th, Chernyshev	Robert Sabolič (44 points: 19 G, 25 A; 58 GP)	Lost in Conference Quarterfinals, 2–4 (Avangard Omsk)
2017–18	56	16	5	5	30	63	120	145	6th, Chernyshev	Vladimir Tkachev (30 points: 14 G, 16 A; 36 GP)	Did not Qualify
2018–19	62	18	5	5	34	51	139	176	6th, Chernyshev	Konstantin Glazachev (28 points: 16 G, 12 A; 54 GP)	Did not Qualify
2019–20	62	16	10	4	32	56	126	177	6th, Chernyshev	Martin Bakoš (42 points: 19 G, 23 A; 61 GP)	Did not Qualify
2020–21	Did not participate due to the COVID-19 pandemic										
2021–22	49	11	4	5	29	35	88	150	6th, Chernyshev	Libor Šulák (26 points: 8 G, 18 A; 49 GP)	Did not Qualify
2022–23	68	21	12	9	26	75	131	139	4th, Chernyshev	Libor Šulák (40 points: 13 G, 27 A; 67 GP)	Lost in Conference Semifinals, 2–4 (Ak Bars Kazan)
2023–24	68	14	7	12	35	54	148	197	5th, Chernyshev	Daniil Gutik (36 points: 12 G, 24 A; 68 GP)	Did not Qualify
2024–25	68	19	9	13	27	69	184	204	4th, Chernyshev	Daniil Gutik (53 points: 26 G, 27 A; 68 GP)	Lost in Last 16, 2–4 (Traktor Chelyabinsk)
2025–26	68	16	4	12	36	52	161	209	6th, Chernyshev	Libor Šulák (43 points: 14 G, 29 A; 68 GP)	Did not Qualify

== Players ==
=== Current roster ===
Updated 29 September 2026.

No.	Nat	Player	Pos	S/G	Age	Acquired	Birthplace
87	(Kazakhstan)	Jelal-ad-Din Amirbekov	G	L	24	2026	Tashkent, Uzbekistan
1	(Kazakhstan)	Nikita Boyarkin	G	L	28	2026	Karaganda, Kazakhstan
72	(Russia)	Oskar Bulavchuk	LW	R	22	2026	Omsk, Russia
36	(Canada)	Anthony Camara	LW	L	33	2026	Toronto, Ontario, Canada
11	(Belarus)	Yegor Chezganov	C	R	24	2026	Zhlobin, Belarus
41	(Russia)	Alexander Daryin	LW	R	26	2025	Yaroslavl, Russia
15	(Russia)	Mikhail Grass	C	L	22	2026	Chelyabinsk, Russia
77	(Slovakia)	Mário Grman	D	R	29	2024	Topoľčany, Slovakia
28	(Russia)	Semyon Ibragimov	D	L	23	2026	Moscow, Russia
21	(Russia)	Danila Khulapov	RW	L	25	2026	Moscow, Russia
95	(Russia)	Yegor Korbit	RW	L	26	2026	Penza, Russia
55	(Russia)	Fyodor Kroshchinsky	D	L	24	2026	Moscow, Russia
23	(Russia)	Artyom Kudashov	D	L	21	2025	Moscow, Russia
35	(Belarus)	Ivan Kulbakov	G	L	30	2025	Gomel, Belarus
65	(Russia)	Konstantin Luchevnikov	D	L	31	2026	Chelyabinsk, Russia
93	(Russia)	Danila Moiseyev	C	L	28	2026	Chelyabinsk, Russia
7	(Russia)	Ilya Morozov	D	L	27	2026	Novosibirsk, Russia
45	(Russia)	Dmitri Mukhtarov	RW	L	20	2026	Moscow, Russia
71	(Russia)	Ivan Muranov (A)	LW	L	27	2024	Moscow, Russia
24	(Kazakhstan)	Maxim Musorov	LW	R	25	2026	Ust-Kamenogorsk, Kazakhstan
25	(Canada)	Kyle Olson	C	R	27	2025	Calgary, Alberta, Canada
19	(Russia)	Artyom Pimenov	C	L	30	2026	Sarapul, Russia
73	(Czech Republic)	Libor Šulák (C)	D	L	32	2023	Pelhřimov, Czech Republic
9	(Russia)	Vladislav Tsitsyura	C	L	27	2026	Rybinsk, Russia
47	(Russia)	Daniel Usmanov (A)	C	R	24	2026	Mytishchi, Russia
16	(Russia)	Grigori Vashchenko	D	L	31	2026	St. Petersburg, Russia
97	(Russia)	Alexander Volkov	C	L	23	2026	Lyubertsy, Russia
70	(Russia)	Ivan Yanchenko	C	L	22	2026	Gomel, Belarus
94	(Russia)	Nikita Yefremov	D	L	25	2026	Zarinsk, Russia
17	(Russia)	Dmitry Zavgorodniy (A)	LW	R	26	2023	Omsk, Russia
44	(Russia)	Kirill Zhukov	D	L	22	2026	Magnitogorsk, Russia

=== Team captains ===
- Enver Lisin, 2013
- Andrei Nikitenko, 2013–2014
- Ilya Zubov, 2014–2015
- Oskars Bartulis, 2015–2018
- Konstantin Glazachev, 2018–2020
- Dmitri Lugin, 2021
- Libor Šulák, 2021–2023
- Anton Berlyov, 2023–2024
- Libor Šulák, 2024–present

=== Head coaches ===
- Hannu Jortikka, 2013
- Sergei Svetlov, 2013–2014
- Dusan Gregor, 2014
- Sergei Shepelev, 2014–2015
- Alexander Andrievsky, 2015–2017
- Fredrik Stillman, 2017
- Andrei Razin, 2017–2018
- Oleg Leontyev*, 2018
- Sergei Svetlov, 2018–2020
- Sergei Vostrikov, 2021
- Alexander Andrievsky, 2021–2021
- Leonids Tambijevs, 2021–2026
- Oleg Bratash, 2026–
