= 2012 Junior Club World Cup =

Tournament details
- Host country: Russia
- Venue(s): Omsk Arena & Blinov Sports and Concerts Complex, Omsk
- Dates: 18–26 August 2012
- Teams: 10

Final positions
- Champions: (Canada) Sudbury Wolves (1st title)
- Runners-up: (United States) Waterloo Black Hawks
- Third place: (Sweden) Linköpings HC
- Fourth place: (Belarus) Dinamo-Shinnik

The 2012 Junior Club World Cup was the 2nd Junior Club World Cup, an annual international ice hockey tournament. It took place between 18–26 August 2012 in Omsk, Russia.

The 2012 edition of the tournament will be sanctioned by the IIHF. Omsk, the host of the 2011 Junior Club World Cup, was also host the 2012 edition. The tournament featured the Sudbury Wolves of the Ontario Hockey League among other participants. Originally the tournament was to be composed of 12 teams. Teams from Slovakia and Switzerland however eventually did not participate in the tournament.

The tournament was attended by over 30,000 fans in the historic stadium.

== Teams ==
=== Group A ===
Team	Location	League	Affiliation	Notes
Norway national U20 team	Norway	Division IA of 2013 IIHF World U20 Championships		
(Belarus) Dinamo-Shinnik	Babruysk, Belarus	Minor Hockey League	Dinamo Minsk (KHL)	
(Russia) Omskie Yastreby	Omsk, Russia	Minor Hockey League	Avangard Omsk (KHL)	2012 Kharlamov Cup Champion
(Czech Republic) HC Energie Karlovy Vary	Karlovy Vary, Czech Republic	NOEN extraliga juniorů	HC Energie Karlovy Vary (Czech Extraliga)	2012 Czech Junior Quarter-Finalist; Will join Minor Hockey League for 2012–13 season
(United States) Waterloo Black Hawks	Waterloo, Iowa, United States	United States Hockey League		2012 USHL Clark Cup Finalist

=== Group B ===
Team	City	League	Affiliation	Note
Denmark national U20 team		Division IA of 2013 IIHF World U20 Championships		Member of the Top Division of the 2012 IIHF World U20 Championship
(Finland) HIFK	Helsinki	Nuorten SM-liiga	HIFK (SM-liiga)	2012 Finnish Junior Champion
(Sweden) Linköpings HC	Linköping	J20 SuperElit	Linköpings HC (Elitserien)	2012 Swedish Junior Champion
(Latvia) HK Riga	Riga	Minor Hockey League	Dinamo Riga (KHL)	2012 MHL Conference Quarter-Finalist
(Canada) Sudbury Wolves	Greater Sudbury	Ontario Hockey League		2012 OHL Conference Quarter-Finalist
