= 2013 Junior Club World Cup =

Tournament details
- Host country: Russia
- Venue(s): Omsk Arena & Blinov Sports and Concerts Complex, Omsk
- Dates: 25–31 August 2013
- Teams: 8

Final positions
- Champions: (Russia) Omskie Yastreby (1st title)
- Runners-up: (Finland) HPK
- Third place: (United States) Dubuque Fighting Saints
- Fourth place: (Belarus) Dinamo-Shinnik

Tournament statistics
- Games played: 18
- Goals scored: 103 (5.72 per game)

The 2013 Junior Club World Cup was the 3rd Junior Club World Cup, an annual international ice hockey tournament. It took place between 25 and 31 August 2013 in Omsk, Russia.

The 2013 edition was hosted by Omsk, the host of the 2011 and 2012 editions of the World Cup. 8 teams participated in the tournament.

== Teams ==
=== Group A ===
Team	City	League	Affiliation	Note
(United States) Dubuque Fighting Saints	Dubuque, Iowa	United States Hockey League		2013 Clark Cup champion
(Czech Republic) HC Vítkovice Steel	Ostrava	NOEN Extraliga juniorů	HC Vítkovice Steel (Czech Extraliga)	2013 Czech Junior champion
(Russia) Omskie Yastreby	Omsk	Minor Hockey League	Avangard Omsk (Kontinental Hockey League)	2013 Kharlamov Cup champion
(Latvia) HK Rīga	Riga	Minor Hockey League	Dinamo Riga (Kontinental Hockey League)	2013 Kharlamov Cup playoffs conference quarter-finalist

=== Group B ===
Team	City	League	Affiliation	Note
(Sweden) Frölunda Indians	Gothenburg	J20 SuperElit	Frölunda HC (Elitserien)	2013 Swedish Junior team
(Finland) HPK	Hämeenlinna	Nuorten SM-liiga	HPK (SM-liiga)	2013 Finnish Junior champion
(Belarus) Dinamo-Shinnik	Babruysk	Minor Hockey League	HC Dinamo Minsk (Kontinental Hockey League)	2013 Kharlamov Cup playoffs conference quarter-finalist
(Canada) Sudbury Wolves	Greater Sudbury	Ontario Hockey League		2012 Junior Club World Cup champion 2013 OHL Playoffs Conference Semi-finalist

== Group stage ==
=== Key ===
- W (regulation win) – 3 pts.
- OTW (overtime/shootout win) – 2 pts.
- OTL (overtime/shootout loss) – 1 pt.
- L (regulation loss) – 0 pts.

==== Group A ====
Team	Pld	W	OTW	OTL	L	GF	GA	GD	Pts	Qualification
(United States) Dubuque Fighting Saints	3	2	0	0	1	10	9	+1	6	Advanced to the semi-finals
(Russia) Omskie Yastreby	3	2	0	0	1	15	10	+5	6	Advanced to the semi-finals
(Latvia) HK Rīga	3	1	1	0	1	11	10	+1	5	
(Czech Republic) HC Vítkovice Steel	3	0	0	1	2	3	10	−7	1	

25 August 2013; 14:00 OMST (UTC+07:00)	Dubuque Fighting Saints (United States)	2 – 5 (1–1, 1–3, 0–1)	(Latvia) HK Rīga	Omsk Arena, Omsk, Russia

Game reference

25 August 2013; 18:00 OMST (UTC+07:00)	Omskie Yastreby (Russia)	5 – 1 (4–0, 1–0, 0–1)	(Czech Republic) HC Vítkovice Steel	Omsk Arena, Omsk, Russia

Game reference

26 August 2013; 15:00 OMST (UTC+07:00)	HC Vítkovice Steel (Czech Republic)	0 – 2 (0–0, 0–0, 0–2)	(United States) Dubuque Fighting Saints	Omsk Arena, Omsk, Russia

Game reference

26 August 2013; 19:00 OMST (UTC+07:00)	HK Rīga (Latvia)	3 – 6 (0–2, 1–2, 2–2)	(Russia) Omskie Yastreby	Omsk Arena, Omsk, Russia

Game reference

28 August 2013; 15:00 OMST (UTC+07:00)	HC Vítkovice Steel (Czech Republic)	2 – 3 (SO) (0–2, 1–0, 1–0, 0–0, 0–1)	(Latvia) HK Rīga	Omsk Arena, Omsk, Russia

Game reference

28 August 2013; 19:00 OMST (UTC+07:00)	Omskie Yastreby (Russia)	4 – 6 (0–3, 1–1, 3–2)	(United States) Dubuque Fighting Saints	Omsk Arena, Omsk, Russia

Game reference

==== Group B ====
Team	Pld	W	OTW	OTL	L	GF	GA	GD	Pts	Qualification
(Belarus) Dinamo-Shinnik	3	2	0	0	1	10	8	+2	6	Advanced to the semi-finals
(Finland) HPK	3	2	0	0	1	10	9	+1	6	Advanced to the semi-finals
(Canada) Sudbury Wolves	3	1	0	0	2	8	10	−2	3	
(Sweden) Frölunda Indians	3	1	0	0	2	9	10	−1	3	

25 August 2013; 15:00 OMST (UTC+07:00)	Sudbury Wolves (Canada)	1 – 5 (1–1, 0–2, 0–2)	(Belarus) Dinamo-Shinnik	Blinov Sports and Concerts Complex, Omsk, Russia

Game reference

25 August 2013; 19:00 OMST (UTC+07:00)	Frölunda Indians (Sweden)	3 – 4 (1–0, 1–2, 1–2)	(Finland) HPK	Blinov Sports and Concerts Complex, Omsk, Russia

Game reference

26 August 2013; 15:00 OMST (UTC+07:00)	HPK (Finland)	4 – 3 (1–0, 0–0, 3–3)	(Canada) Sudbury Wolves	Blinov Sports and Concerts Complex, Omsk, Russia

Game reference

26 August 2013; 19:00 OMST (UTC+07:00)	Dinamo-Shinnik (Belarus)	2 – 5 (1–2, 0–1, 1–2)	(Sweden) Frölunda Indians	Blinov Sports and Concerts Complex, Omsk, Russia

Game reference

28 August 2013; 15:00 OMST (UTC+07:00)	HPK (Finland)	2 – 3 (0–2, 1–1, 1–0)	(Belarus) Dinamo-Shinnik	Blinov Sports and Concerts Complex, Omsk, Russia

Game reference

28 August 2013; 19:00 OMST (UTC+07:00)	Frölunda Indians (Sweden)	1 – 4 (0–1, 1–3, 0–0)	(Canada) Sudbury Wolves	Blinov Sports and Concerts Complex, Omsk, Russia

Game reference

== Play-off round ==
Semi-finals
(Belarus) Dinamo-Shinnik	0
(Russia) Omskie Yastreby	3
(United States) Dubuque Fighting Saints	2
(Finland) HPK	3

Final
(Russia) Omskie Yastreby	2
(Finland) HPK	0
Third place
(Belarus) Dinamo-Shinnik	1
(United States) Dubuque Fighting Saints	4

=== Semi-finals ===
29 August 2013; 15:00 OMST (UTC+07:00)	Dinamo-Shinnik (Belarus)	0 – 3 (0–1, 0–0, 0–2)	(Russia) Omskie Yastreby	Omsk Arena, Omsk, Russia

Game reference

29 August 2013; 19:00 OMST (UTC+07:00)	Dubuque Fighting Saints (United States)	2 – 3 (0–1, 1–2, 1–0)	(Finland) HPK	Omsk Arena, Omsk, Russia

Game reference

=== 7th place game ===
29 August 2013; 15:00 OMST (UTC+07:00)	Frölunda Indians (Sweden)	5 – 2 (2–1, 3–0, 0–1)	(Czech Republic) HC Vítkovice Steel	Blinov Sports and Concerts Complex, Omsk, Russia

Game reference

=== 5th place game ===
29 August 2013; 19:00 OMST (UTC+07:00)	HK Rīga (Latvia)	3 – 2 (1–0, 1–1, 1–1)	(Canada) Sudbury Wolves	Blinov Sports and Concerts Complex, Omsk, Russia

Game reference

=== 3rd place game ===
31 August 2013; 13:00 OMST (UTC+07:00)	Dinamo-Shinnik (Belarus)	1 – 4 (0–1, 0–2, 1–1)	(United States) Dubuque Fighting Saints	Omsk Arena, Omsk, Russia

Game reference

=== Final ===
31 August 2013; 17:00 OMST (UTC+07:00)	Omskie Yastreby (Russia)	2 – 0 (1–0, 1–0, 0–0)	(Finland) HPK	Omsk Arena, Omsk, Russia

Game reference

== Final standings ==
Rank	Team
Gold medal	(Russia) Omskie Yastreby
Silver medal	(Finland) HPK
Bronze medal	(United States) Dubuque Fighting Saints
4	(Belarus) Dinamo-Shinnik
5	(Latvia) HK Rīga
6	(Canada) Sudbury Wolves
7	(Sweden) Frölunda Indians
8	(Czech Republic) HC Vítkovice Steel
