= Matvei Michkov =

Russian ice hockey player (born 2004)

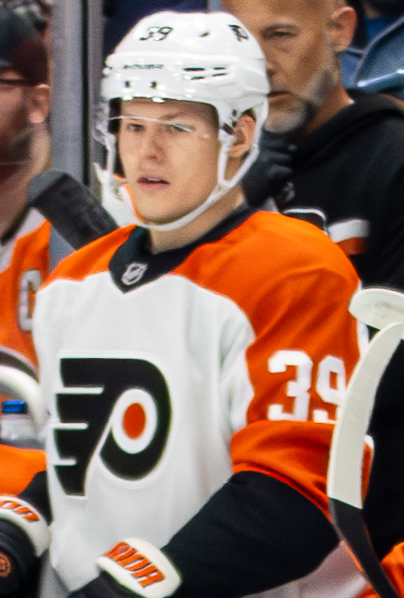
- Michkov with the Philadelphia Flyers in 2024
- Born: 9 December 2004 (age 21) Perm, Russia
- Height: 5 ft 10 in (178 cm)
- Weight: 172 lb (78 kg; 12 st 4 lb)
- Position: Forward
- Shoots: Left
- NHL team Former teams: Philadelphia Flyers; SKA Saint Petersburg; HC Sochi
- NHL draft: 7th overall, 2023; Philadelphia Flyers
- Playing career: 2021–present

Matvei Andreyevich Michkov (Russian: Матвей Андреевич Мичков; born 9 December 2004) is a Russian professional ice hockey player who is a forward for the Philadelphia Flyers of the National Hockey League (NHL). He made his Kontinental Hockey League (KHL) debut with SKA Saint Petersburg in 2021 and played for them and their affiliates until 2022. Michkov was drafted seventh overall by the Flyers in the 2023 NHL entry draft.

== Playing career ==
=== Amateur ===
As early as 2014, Michkov began to get noticed for his ice hockey talent, setting scoring records for his age group. He scored 109 points in 26 games in the Russian under-16 league, and then had 56 points in 56 games as a 16-year-old in the under-20 division, besting the previous record for points, held by Nikita Kucherov.

In 2020, Michkov transferred from the youth program of Lokomotiv Yaroslavl to SKA Saint Petersburg. He played the 2020–21 season with both SKA-1946 and SKA Varyagi of the Youth Hockey League (MHL), recording 56 points in 56 games. He led the league in goals scored with 38, and finished eighth overall in points. He also set a new record for points by a 16-year-old in the MHL

=== Professional ===
In 2021, Michkov made his professional debut with SKA Saint Petersburg of the Kontinental Hockey League (KHL), with his first game coming on 2 September 2021. He split the season with SKA and their junior affiliates; he had five points in 13 games in the KHL, and a further 51 points in 28 games with SKA-1946 and SKA Varyagi in the MHL.

During the 2020–21 season, he signed a five-year contract with SKA Saint Petersburg that would have kept him playing in Russia until the 2025–26 season.

Michkov missed two months in the KHL after suffering an injury from Alexei Emelin. He joined SKA's minor-league affiliate SKA-Neva of the Supreme Hockey League (VHL) for the 2022–23 season. Michkov was considered one of the top prospects for the 2023 NHL entry draft, though some scouts and pundits speculated he may have dropped due to the ongoing Russian invasion of Ukraine.

SKA loaned Michkov to HC Sochi on 20 December 2022, for the rest of the 2022–23 season. At the time Michkov had played three games with SKA and had not recorded a point. He also played 14 games in the VHL with SKA-Neva, recording 14 points. Though HC Sochi finished with the worst record in the KHL, Michkov finished fourth in team scoring with 20 points in 27 games; his point-per-game average of .67 was the highest for a draft-eligible player in KHL history.

At the 2023 NHL entry draft, Michkov was selected with the seventh overall pick by the Philadelphia Flyers. Continuing his development in Russia, Michkov returned to SKA for the commencement of the 2023–24 season. Beginning the season as a healthy scratch, Michkov featured in just one game with SKA, before he was returned to Sochi on loan for the remainder of the season on 12 September 2023. Less than four months after he was drafted, Yahoo! Sports questioned if teams had "missed the ball", finding it "hard to reconcile Michkov slipping to seventh"; Michkov scored 14 points in 14 games and was voted into the KHL All-Star Game. He completed the season with Sochi collecting a team leading 19 goals, while placing second in scoring with 41 points through 47 regular season games.

=== Philadelphia Flyers ===
On 1 July 2024, Michkov signed a three-year, entry-level contract with the Philadelphia Flyers. Flyers general manager Daniel Brière speculated part of the reason Michkov fell in the draft was due to his KHL contract keeping him in Russia until 2026, and expressed amazement he was able to join the team earlier than expected. Qualifying for the team out of training camp, Michkov recorded his first NHL point against the Calgary Flames on 12 October, in a 6–3 loss; he assisted on a goal by Travis Konecny. His first two NHL goals came on 15 October, in a 4–3 overtime loss to the Edmonton Oilers, both scored on the power play. Michkov was named NHL's rookie of the month after he recorded four goals and five assists for nine points in 11 games played during October. On 30 November, against the St. Louis Blues, Michkov became the fourth teenager in NHL history to record 3 overtime goals, joining Sidney Crosby, Ilya Kovalchuk and Rick Nash as the only players to accomplish the feat. Michkov was again named Rookie of the Month for February 2025, after recording 5 goals and 5 assists for 10 points in 7 games.

Michkov finished his rookie season with 26 goals, the most among all rookies, and 37 assists for 63 points in 80 games. He finished fourth in voting for the Calder Memorial Trophy and was named to the 2025 NHL All-Rookie Team for his efforts.

== International play ==
Medal record

Men's ice hockey

Representing Russia

World U18 Championships
Silver medal – second place	2021 United States	

Hlinka Gretzky Cup
Gold medal – first place	2021 Czech Republic/Slovakia	

Michkov scored a hat trick playing for the Russia under-18 team against Germany in the 2021 World U18 Championships. He was named the most valuable of the tournament at 16 years old, and also won the scoring race with 12 goals, the most goals ever scored by a Russian and the second-highest single-tournament total in history, and 16 points. Michkov was also named best forward and made the media all-star team. Russia earned the silver medal.

== Personal life ==
Michkov was born in Perm, and has played ice hockey since receiving his first pair of skates at age 3. In order to further develop his ice hockey career, he, along with his parents and brother, moved to Yaroslavl to join the youth program of Lokomotiv Yaroslavl in 2015.

Michkov's father Andrei was a scout of the Russian national team system and Michkov's first coach. In April 2023, he was reported missing, and was found dead two days later, in a pond located in a residential area near Sochi.

In 2026, Michkov was nominated for the Stroganov Prize by the Perm Community. The nomination states "Michkov is the only Perm hockey alumnus to be selected in the first round of the NHL Entry Draft", and expresses that his accomplishments have solidified him as a "role model for thousands of young athletes in the Kama region" (translated).

== Career statistics ==
=== Regular season and playoffs ===
			Regular season					Playoffs
Season	Team	League	GP	G	A	Pts	PIM	GP	G	A	Pts	PIM
2020–21	SKA Varyagi	MHL	6	3	1	4	2	—	—	—	—	—
2020–21	SKA-1946	MHL	50	35	17	52	45	5	1	2	3	6
2021–22	SKA Saint Petersburg	KHL	13	2	3	5	0	—	—	—	—	—
2021–22	SKA Varyagi	MHL	6	8	5	13	2	—	—	—	—	—
2021–22	SKA-1946	MHL	22	22	16	38	22	17	13	4	17	16
2022–23	SKA Saint Petersburg	KHL	3	0	0	0	2	—	—	—	—	—
2022–23	SKA-Neva	VHL	12	10	4	14	4	—	—	—	—	—
2022–23	HC Sochi	KHL	27	9	11	20	14	—	—	—	—	—
2022–23	Kapitan Stupino	MHL	—	—	—	—	—	5	4	3	7	27
2023–24	SKA Saint Petersburg	KHL	1	0	0	0	0	—	—	—	—	—
2023–24	HC Sochi	KHL	47	19	22	41	26	—	—	—	—	—
2024–25	Philadelphia Flyers	NHL	80	26	37	63	46	—	—	—	—	—
2025–26	Philadelphia Flyers	NHL	81	20	31	51	71	8	0	1	1	6
KHL totals			91	30	36	66	42	—	—	—	—	—
NHL totals			161	46	68	114	117	8	0	1	1	6

=== International ===
Year	Team	Event	Result	GP	G	A	Pts	PIM
2021	Russia	U18	2nd place, silver medalist(s)	7	12	4	16	4
2021	Russia	HG18	1st place, gold medalist(s)	5	8	5	13	0
Junior totals				12	20	9	29	4

== Awards and honours ==
Award	Year
NHL
NHL All-Rookie Team	2025

Awards and achievements
Preceded by Cutter Gauthier	Philadelphia Flyers first-round draft pick 2023	Succeeded by Oliver Bonk
