= Alexey Marchenko =

Russian ice hockey player (born 1992)

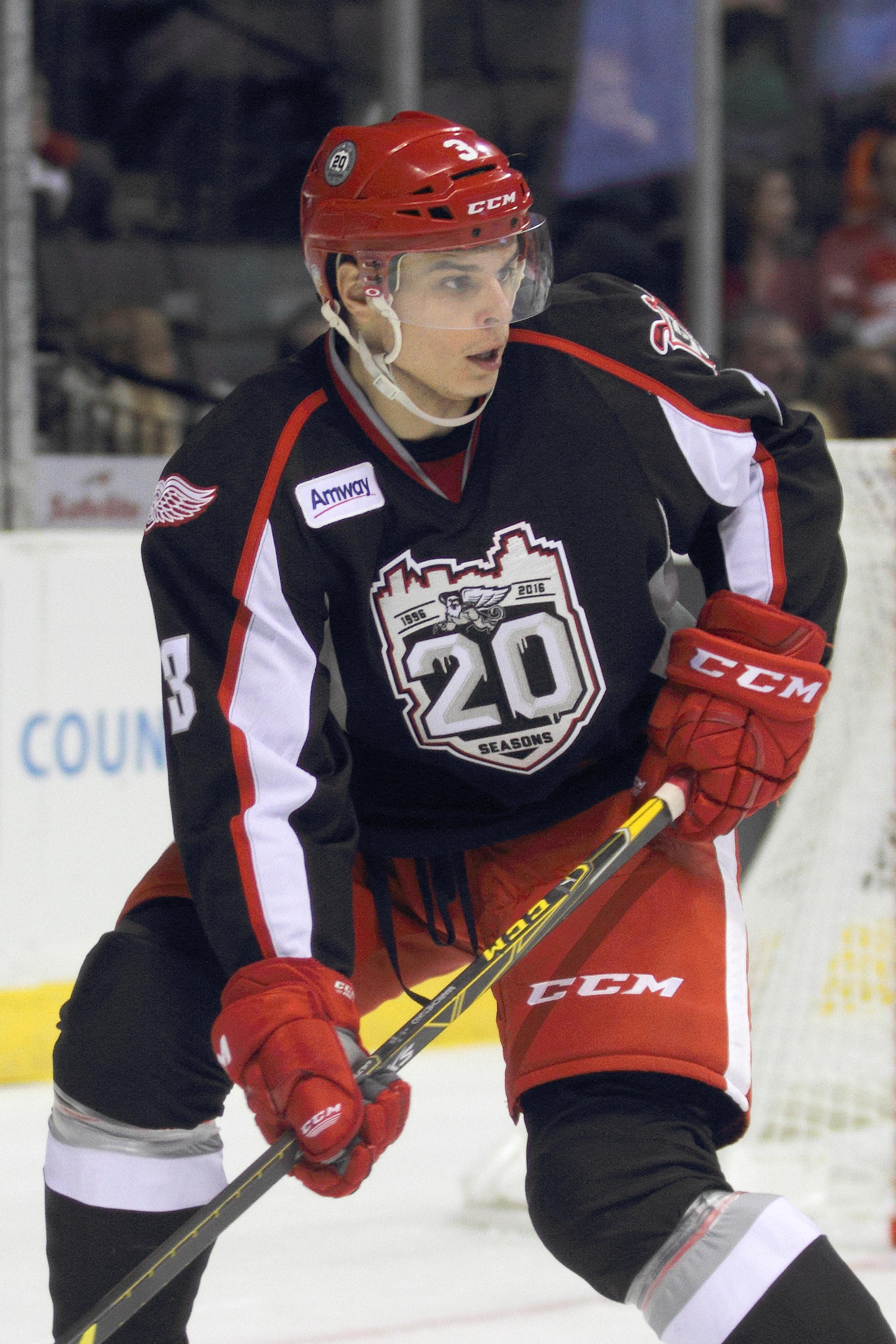
- Marchenko with the Grand Rapids Griffins in 2015
- Born: 2 January 1992 (age 34) Moscow, Russia
- Height: 6 ft 3 in (191 cm)
- Weight: 210 lb (95 kg; 15 st 0 lb)
- Position: Defence
- Shoots: Right
- KHL team Former teams: Ak Bars Kazan; CSKA Moscow; Detroit Red Wings; Toronto Maple Leafs; Lokomotiv Yaroslavl
- National team: Russia
- NHL draft: 205th overall, 2011; Detroit Red Wings
- Playing career: 2013–present

Alexey Igorevich Marchenko (Russian: Алексей Игоревич Марченко; born 2 January 1992) is a Russian professional ice hockey defenceman who is currently playing for Ak Bars Kazan in the Kontinental Hockey League (KHL). Marchenko was drafted 205th overall by the Detroit Red Wings in the 2011 NHL entry draft.

== Playing career ==
As a youth, Marchenko played in the 2005 Quebec International Pee-Wee Hockey Tournament with a team from Moscow.

=== Junior ===
During the 2009–10 season, Marchenko appeared in 43 games for CSKA's junior club, Red Army of the MHL, and recorded 11 goals and 12 assists as well as going scoreless in two playoff games for the club. He also appeared in 10 KHL games for CSKA Moscow and failed to register a point.

During the 2010–11 season, Marchenko recorded 38 points in 36 games for Red Army, along with three goals and eight assists in 15 playoff games, to help his club capture the Kharlamov Cup. He also appeared in 23 KHL games for CSKA, where he recorded two assists.

During the 2011–12 season, Marchenko skated in six games for CSKA Moscow in the KHL and was impressive in the MHL playoffs after missing most of the season, due to a knee injury. He was scoreless in his brief KHL stint. He skated in five regular season games for Red Army in the MHL, recording two goals and four assists. Marchenko was the leading scorer amongst defensemen for Red Army in the playoffs, finishing with four goals and 14 assists. The defending Kharlamov Cup champions, Red Army was defeated by Omskie Yastrebi in the MHL finals.

=== Professional ===
During the 2012–13 season, Marchenko played 44 games for CSKA Moscow in his first full KHL season. He recorded four goals and five assists. CSKA finished first in the Tarasov Division and swept Lev Praha before falling to Dynamo Moscow in the Western Conference semifinals. Marchenko saw limited ice time in seven playoff games; finishing with no points nor penalty minutes.

On 30 May 2013, Marchenko signed a three-year entry-level contract with the Detroit Red Wings.

During the 2013–14 season, Marchenko was assigned to the Red Wings's AHL affiliate, the Grand Rapids Griffins. In his rookie season, Marchenko recorded three goals and 15 assists in 49 games. On 4 January 2014, Marchenko made his NHL debut in a game against the Dallas Stars. On 23 February 2014, in a game against the Milwaukee Admirals, Marchenko went feet-first into the boards, and suffered a severe high ankle sprain. An MRI revealed a fractured bone and a day later he had surgery in Grand Rapids where doctors inserted stabilizing screws into his ankle. As a result, he missed the remainder of the season.

On 28 February 2015, Marchenko scored his first career NHL goal against Pekka Rinne of the Nashville Predators.

On 1 July 2016, Marchenko signed a two-year contract extension with the Red Wings. In the following 2016–17 season, Marchenko appeared in 30 games registering 6 assists, before he was placed on waivers by the Red Wings on 3 February 2017. The following day, he was claimed by the Toronto Maple Leafs, marking a reunion with former head coach Mike Babcock. In a game against his former team Marchenko scored his first goal of the 2016–17 NHL season on 7 March 2017.

In the off-season, Marchenko was placed on waivers and released from the final year of his contract with the Maple Leafs on 14 August 2017. With the intention to return to Russia and resume playing for CSKA Moscow, Marchenko promptly agreed to a three-year contract with his original club on 16 August 2017.

At the conclusion of his three-year contract with CSKA, helping claim the Gagarin Cup in 2019, Marchenko left the club as a free agent to sign a two-year contract with Lokomotiv Yaroslavl on 6 May 2020.

== International play ==
Medal record

Ice hockey

Representing Olympic Athletes from Russia

Olympic Games
Gold medal – first place	2018 Pyeongchang	

Representing Russia

World Championships
Bronze medal – third place	2016 Russia	

World Junior A Challenge
Bronze medal – third place	2009 Summerside	

Marchenko made his international debut for Russia at the 2008 World U-17 Hockey Challenge, where he recorded one goal in five games. He later represented Russia at the 2009 World U-17 Hockey Challenge, where he recorded three assists in five games.

Marchenko represented Russia at the 2016 IIHF World Championship, where he recorded one goal and two assists in ten games, and won a bronze medal. Marchenko again represented Russia at the 2016 World Cup of Hockey. He was a member of the Olympic Athletes from Russia team that competed at the 2018 Winter Olympics.

== Career statistics ==
=== Regular season and playoffs ===
			Regular season					Playoffs
Season	Team	League	GP	G	A	Pts	PIM	GP	G	A	Pts	PIM
2008–09	CSKA–2 Moscow	RUS.3	46	7	22	29	77	14	2	3	5	33
2009–10	Krasnaya Armiya	MHL	43	11	23	34	59	2	0	0	0	4
2009–10	CSKA Moscow	KHL	10	0	0	0	0	—	—	—	—	—
2010–11	Krasnaya Armiya	MHL	36	5	33	38	28	15	3	8	11	31
2010–11	CSKA Moscow	KHL	23	0	2	2	4	—	—	—	—	—
2011–12	Krasnaya Armiya	MHL	5	2	4	6	10	19	4	14	18	18
2011–12	CSKA Moscow	KHL	6	0	0	0	2	5	0	1	1	4
2012–13	CSKA Moscow	KHL	44	4	5	9	6	7	0	0	0	0
2013–14	Grand Rapids Griffins	AHL	49	3	15	18	14	—	—	—	—	—
2013–14	Detroit Red Wings	NHL	1	0	0	0	2	—	—	—	—	—
2014–15	Grand Rapids Griffins	AHL	51	3	17	20	26	11	0	4	4	2
2014–15	Detroit Red Wings	NHL	13	1	1	2	2	3	0	0	0	0
2015–16	Grand Rapids Griffins	AHL	4	0	0	0	2	—	—	—	—	—
2015–16	Detroit Red Wings	NHL	66	2	9	11	10	3	0	0	0	10
2016–17	Detroit Red Wings	NHL	30	0	6	6	12	—	—	—	—	—
2016–17	Toronto Maple Leafs	NHL	11	1	1	2	0	—	—	—	—	—
2017–18	CSKA Moscow	KHL	42	2	12	14	12	21	0	3	3	10
2018–19	CSKA Moscow	KHL	59	2	17	19	18	20	2	5	7	0
2019–20	CSKA Moscow	KHL	60	6	15	21	26	4	0	1	1	0
2020–21	Lokomotiv Yaroslavl	KHL	58	7	17	24	18	11	1	2	3	2
2021–22	Lokomotiv Yaroslavl	KHL	45	4	21	25	28	4	1	1	2	2
2022–23	Lokomotiv Yaroslavl	KHL	22	0	5	5	4	12	0	3	3	8
2023–24	Ak Bars Kazan	KHL	20	0	2	2	4	2	0	0	0	0
2024–25	Ak Bars Kazan	KHL	66	1	12	13	30	13	0	3	3	4
2025–26	Ak Bars Kazan	KHL	63	0	17	17	28	20	0	4	4	4
KHL totals			517	26	125	151	180	119	4	23	27	34
NHL totals			121	4	17	21	26	6	0	0	0	10

=== International ===
Year	Team	Event	Result	GP	G	A	Pts	PIM
2008	Russia	U17	5th	5	1	0	1	4
2009	Russia	U17	7th	5	0	3	3	10
2009	Russia	IH18	2nd place, silver medalist(s)	4	1	2	3	2
2016	Russia	WC	3rd place, bronze medalist(s)	10	1	2	3	6
2016	Russia	WCH	4th	4	0	0	0	0
2018	OAR	OG	1st place, gold medalist(s)	1	0	0	0	2
Junior totals				14	2	5	7	16
Senior totals				15	1	2	3	8

== Awards and honors ==
Award	Year
MHL
All-Star Game	2010
Best Defenseman	2011
AHL
All-Star Game	2014
KHL
All-Star Game	2019
Gagarin Cup (CSKA Moscow)	2019
