= Mikhail Shalagin =

Russian ice hockey player (born 1999)

- Born: 12 September 1999 (age 26) Moscow, Russia
- Height: 6 ft 4 in (193 cm)
- Weight: 185 lb (84 kg; 13 st 3 lb)
- Position: Left wing
- Shoots: Left
- BLR team Former teams: HC Shakhtyor Soligorsk; Spartak Moscow; Orlando Solar Bears; Avtomobilist Yekaterinburg; Dinamo Minsk; Metallurg Magnitogorsk
- NHL draft: 198th overall, 2019; Tampa Bay Lightning
- Playing career: 2018–present

Mikhail Mikhailovich Shalagin (Russian: Михаил Михайлович Шалагин; born 19 September 1999) is a Russian professional ice hockey left winger who currently plays with HC Shakhtyor Soligorsk of the Belarusian Extraleague (BLR).

== Playing career ==
Shalagin played as a youth within the HC Spartak Moscow organization, making his professional debut in the Supreme Hockey League on loan to Khimik Voskresensk in the 2017–18 season.

He made his Kontinental Hockey League debut for Spartak Moscow during the 2018–19 KHL season, playing in four regular season games. He primarily played 43 games with junior team JHC Spartak Moscow of the MHL tallying 75 points, earning MHL MVP honors. His 48 goals set a new league record for the most in one season.

Having gone unselected in the 2017 and 2018 NHL entry draft, Shalagin was drafted in the seventh round, 198th overall, in the 2019 NHL entry draft by the Tampa Bay Lightning.

Out of contract with Spartak Moscow, Shalagin opted to move to North America to continue his development within the Tampa Bay Lightning organization. On 6 September 2019, Shalagin was signed to a one-year AHL contract with the Lightning's affiliate, the Syracuse Crunch. After attending the Lightning's prospect and training camp, Shalagin participated in the Crunch's training camp. He was later assigned to play the 2019–20 season with ECHL affiliate, the Orlando Solar Bears, posting 7 goals and 10 points in 41 games before the season was cancelled due to the COVID-19 pandemic.

As a free agent and with the uncertainty of the resumption of play in North America, Shalagin opted to return to his original club, Spartak Moscow, by agreeing to a one-year, two-way contract on 15 July 2020. In the 2020–21 season, Shalagin made 8 appearances with second tier affiliate, Khimik Voskresensk, before he was traded by Spartak Moscow to Avtomobilist Yekaterinburg in exchange for Semyon Perelyayev on 12 November 2020.

On 30 May 2021, Shalagin left Avtomobilist as he was traded in an exchange of junior prospects with VHL club, HC Ugra.

On 18 May 2022, Shalagin's KHL rights were acquired by Belarusian-based club, HC Dinamo Minsk. During his tenure with Minsk, Shalagin was loaned to HC Shakhtyor Soligorsk in the Belarusian Extraliga, leading the league in scoring in 2024.

After his contract with Minsk, Shalagin left as a free agent and was signed to a one-year contract with reigning champions, Metallurg Magnitogorsk, on 3 May 2024.

== Career statistics ==
			Regular season					Playoffs
Season	Team	League	GP	G	A	Pts	PIM	GP	G	A	Pts	PIM
2016–17	MHK Spartak Moscow	MHL	34	3	2	5	4	—	—	—	—	—
2017–18	MHK Spartak Moscow	MHL	63	33	30	63	38	6	1	2	3	4
2017–18	Khimik Voskresensk	VHL	3	0	0	0	0	—	—	—	—	—
2018–19	MHK Spartak Moscow	MHL	43	48	27	75	77	3	0	0	0	0
2018–19	Spartak Moscow	KHL	4	0	0	0	0	—	—	—	—	—
2018–19	Khimik Voskresensk	VHL	7	2	0	2	0	—	—	—	—	—
2019–20	Orlando Solar Bears	ECHL	41	7	3	10	8	—	—	—	—	—
2020–21	Khimik Voskresensk	VHL	8	3	0	3	6	—	—	—	—	—
2020–21	Gornyak Uchaly	VHL	25	8	12	20	10	8	4	2	6	8
2020–21	Avtomobilist Yekaterinburg	KHL	2	0	0	0	0	—	—	—	—	—
2021–22	HC Yugra	VHL	15	5	6	11	6	—	—	—	—	—
2021–22	AKM Novomoskovsk	VHL	27	8	13	21	14	—	—	—	—	—
2022–23	Dinamo Minsk	KHL	10	1	1	2	4	—	—	—	—	—
2022–23	HC Shakhtyor Soligorsk	BLR	29	14	5	19	20	11	7	4	11	10
2023–24	HC Shakhtyor Soligorsk	BLR	54	47	36	83	32	7	3	4	7	10
2024–25	Metallurg Magnitogorsk	KHL	4	0	0	0	0	—	—	—	—	—
2024–25	AKM Tula Region	VHL	34	8	13	21	8	—	—	—	—	—
KHL totals			20	1	1	2	4	—	—	—	—	—

== Awards and honours ==
Award	Year
MHL
Most Goals (48)	2019
MVP	2019
