= 2013–14 KHL Medveščak Zagreb season =

2013–14 KHL Medveščak Zagreb
- Division: 4th Bobrov
- Conference: 6th Western
- 2013–14 record: 24–4–12–14
- Home record: 14–3–5–5
- Road record: 10–1–7–9
- Goals for: 138
- Goals against: 126

Team information
- General manager: (Croatia) Markoantonio Belinic (United States) Aaron Fox (Sports M.) (Croatia) Dragutin Ljubic (Team)
- Coach: (Canada) Mark French (Canada) Dean Fedorchuk (Asst.) (Canada) Don MacLean (Asst.) (Croatia) Ivo Ratej (Asst.)
- Captain: (Canada) Alan Letang (Canada) Jonathan Cheechoo (A) (Canada) Andrew Murray (A)
- Arena: Dom sportova (6.500); Arena Zagreb (15.200)
- Average attendance: 7,780 (95.92%)

The 2013–14 KHL Medveščak Zagreb season is the first season for Zagreb based club in Kontinental Hockey League. On 29 April 2013 it was announced that Medveščak became 28th league member and will start to play in 2013-14 season. Prior joining KHL, Medveščak was a member of EBEL hockey league of Austria.

== Schedule and results ==
=== Pre-season ===
The pre-season took place in August and September. The training session started in late July.

Medveščak had to build up an almost entirely new roster following entering the KHL. The main goal was to create a team with the best possible players of Croatian descent. The first signing of KHL era was goalie Mark Dekanich. Also, a new head coach was appointed. On 3 June 2013, it was announced that Canadian Mark French, AHL winner in 2009-10 with Hershey Bears, was named head coach.

2013–14 Game Log
August: 5–0–1–2 (Home: 0–0–0–0; Road: 0–0–1–1; Neutral: 5–0–0–1)

| # | Date | Home team | Score | Away team | Arena | Attendance | Recap |
|---|---|---|---|---|---|---|---|
| 1 | 6 | (Russia) Torpedo Nizhny Novgorod | 1 – 3 | Medveščak Zagreb | Maribor | 500 | |
| 2 | 8 | Medveščak Zagreb | 3 – 0 | Olimpija Ljubljana (Slovenia) | Maribor | | |
| 3 | 11 | (Slovenia) Olimpija Ljubljana | 1 – 6 | Medveščak Zagreb | Maribor | 400 | Archived 2013-10-04 at the Wayback Machine |
| 4 | 17 | (Russia) Vityaz Podolsk | 4 – 2 | Medveščak Zagreb | Maribor | 400 | Archived 2013-10-04 at the Wayback Machine |
| 5 | 18 | (Austria) Linz | 5 – 4 SO | Medveščak Zagreb | Linz | | |
| 6 | 23 | Medveščak Zagreb | 5 – 1 | Saryarka Karaganda (Kazakhstan) | Biasca | 50 | |
| 7 | 24 | Medveščak Zagreb | 5 – 2 | Metallurg Novokuznetsk (Russia) | Biasca | 100 | |
| 8 | 30 | (Austria) Graz 99ers | 2 – 1 | Medveščak Zagreb | Graz | 3,000 | |

Win Overtime/shootout win Overtime/shootout loss Loss

=== Regular season ===
Regular season for Medveščak has started on September 6, 2013 and will last until March 4, 2013. A total of 54 games will be played, 27 at home and 27 away. League will take break from February 6–23 due to the 2014 Winter Olympics in Sochi, Russia.

2013–14 Game Log
September: 4–1–3–4 (Home: 4–1–1–2; Road: 0–0–2–2) Pts. 17

| # | Date | Home team | Score | Away team | Arena | Attendance | Record | Recap |
|---|---|---|---|---|---|---|---|---|
| 1 | 6 | Medveščak Zagreb | 7 – 1 | CSKA Moscow | Dom sportova | 6,500 | 1–0–0–0 | |
| 2 | 8 | Medveščak Zagreb | 1 – 5 | Dinamo Riga (Latvia) | Dom sportova | 6,500 | 1–0–0–1 | |
| 3 | 10 | Medveščak Zagreb | 1 – 3 | Lev Praha (Czech Republic) | Dom sportova | 6,300 | 1–0–0–2 | |
| 4 | 13 | Medveščak Zagreb | 3 – 4 OT | Slovan Bratislava (Slovakia) | Dom sportova | 6,500 | 1–0–1–2 | |
| 5 | 16 | SKA Saint Petersburg | 3 – 0 | Medveščak Zagreb | Ice Palace | 12,300 | 1–0–1–3 | |
| 6 | 18 | Severstal Cherepovets | 6 – 2 | Medveščak Zagreb | Ice Palace | 3,240 | 1–0–1–4 | |
| 7 | 20 | Lokomotiv Yaroslavl | 3 – 2 SO | Medveščak Zagreb | Arena 2000 | 8,687 | 1–0–2–4 | |
| 8 | 22 | Atlant Mytishchi | 3 – 2 OT | Medveščak Zagreb | Mytishchi Arena | 6,100 | 1–0–3–4 | |
| 9 | 24 | Medveščak Zagreb | 4 – 3 SO | SKA Saint Petersburg | Dom sportova | 6,400 | 1–1–3–4 | |
| 10 | 26 | Medveščak Zagreb | 2 – 1 | Yugra Khanty-Mansiysk | Dom sportova | 5,600 | 2–1–3–4 | |
| 11 | 28 | Medveščak Zagreb | 3 – 2 | Barys Astana (Kazakhstan) | Dom sportova | 6,350 | 3–1–3–4 | |
| 12 | 30 | Medveščak Zagreb | 3 – 0 | Avtomobilist Yekaterinburg | Dom sportova | 6,350 | 4–1–3–4 | |

October: 4–2–2–3 (Home: 3–1–1–0; Road: 1–1–1–3) Pts. 18

| # | Date | Home team | Score | Away team | Arena | Attendance | Record | Recap |
|---|---|---|---|---|---|---|---|---|
| 13 | 2 | Medveščak Zagreb | 4 – 0 | Avangard Omsk | Dom sportova | 6,300 | 5–1–3–4 | |
| 14 | 7 | Medveščak Zagreb | 6 – 0 | Neftekhimik Nizhnekamsk | Dom sportova | 6,500 | 6–1–3–4 | |
| 15 | 9 | (Belarus) Dinamo Minsk | 2 – 3 OT | Medveščak Zagreb | Minsk-Arena | 13,100 | 6–2–3–4 | |
| 16 | 11 | (Ukraine) Donbass Donetsk | 2 – 5 | Medveščak Zagreb | Druzhba Arena | 4,003 | 7–2–3–4 | |
| 17 | 13 | Medveščak Zagreb | 2 – 3 SO | Spartak Moscow | Dom sportova | 6,500 | 7–2–4–4 | |
| 18 | 17 | Ak Bars Kazan | 5 – 3 | Medveščak Zagreb | TatNeft Arena | 4,000 | 7–2–4–5 | |
| 19 | 19 | Dynamo Moscow | 4 – 3 | Medveščak Zagreb | Minor Arena | 6,881 | 7–2–4–6 | |
| 20 | 21 | Vityaz Podolsk | 1 – 0 | Medveščak Zagreb | Podolsk Hero Arena | 3,000 | 7–2–4–7 | |
| 21 | 23 | Torpedo Nizhny Novgorod | 2 – 1 OT | Medveščak Zagreb | Trade Union Sport Palace | 5,300 | 7–2–5–7 | |
| 22 | 28 | Medveščak Zagreb | 2 – 1 | Amur Khabarovsk | Dom sportova | 6,500 | 8–2–5–7 | |
| 23 | 30 | Medveščak Zagreb | 3 – 2 SO | Admiral Vladivostok | Dom sportova | 6,267 | 8–3–5–7 | |

November: 3–1–2–3 (Home: 2–1–1–1; Road: 1–0–1–2) Pts. 13

| # | Date | Home team | Score | Away team | Arena | Attendance | Record | Recap |
|---|---|---|---|---|---|---|---|---|
| 24 | 1 | Medveščak Zagreb | 4 – 3 SO | Metallurg Novokuznetsk | Dom sportova | 6,500 | 8–4–5–7 | |
| 25 | 13 | Neftekhimik Nizhnekamsk | 3 – 2 SO | Medveščak Zagreb | SCC Arena | 5,500 | 8–4–6–7 | |
| 26 | 15 | Salavat Yulaev Ufa | 2 – 3 | Medveščak Zagreb | Ufa Arena | 7,430 | 9–4–6–7 | |
| 27 | 17 | Metallurg Magnitogorsk | 4 – 0 | Medveščak Zagreb | Magnitogorsk Arena | 7,167 | 9–4–6–8 | |
| 28 | 19 | Traktor Chelyabinsk | 5 – 1 | Medveščak Zagreb | Traktor Sport Palace | 7,000 | 9–4–6–9 | |
| 29 | 22 | Medveščak Zagreb | 2 – 1 | Metallurg Magnitogorsk | Dom sportova | 6,500 | 10–4–6–9 | |
| 30 | 24 | Medveščak Zagreb | 4 – 5 SO | Traktor Chelyabinsk | Dom sportova | 6,500 | 10–4–7–9 | |
| 31 | 26 | Medveščak Zagreb | 0 – 1 | Salavat Yulaev Ufa | Dom sportova | 6,300 | 10–4–7–10 | |
| 32 | 28 | Medveščak Zagreb | 6 – 1 | Sibir Novosibirsk | Dom sportova | 6,432 | 11–4–7–10 | |

December: 5–0–2–1 (Home: 2–0–1–1; Road: 3–0–1–0) Pts. 17

| # | Date | Home team | Score | Away team | Arena | Attendance | Record | Recap |
|---|---|---|---|---|---|---|---|---|
| 33 | 2 | Metallurg Novokuznetsk | 1 – 5 | Medveščak Zagreb | Sports Palace | 2,739 | 12–4–7–10 | |
| 34 | 4 | Sibir Novosibirsk | 0 – 2 | Medveščak Zagreb | Ice Sports Palace Sibir | 6,400 | 13–4–7–10 | |
| 35 | 6 | Admiral Vladivostok | 0 – 2 | Medveščak Zagreb | Fetisov Arena | 5,500 | 14–4–7–10 | |
| 36 | 8 | Amur Khabarovsk | 4 – 3 SO | Medveščak Zagreb | Platinum Arena | 7,100 | 14–4–8–10 | |
| 37 | 11 | Medveščak Zagreb | 6 – 5 | Ak Bars Kazan | Dom sportova | 5,984 | 15–4–8–10 | |
| 38 | 13 | Medveščak Zagreb | 0 – 1 SO | Torpedo Nizhny Novgorod | Dom sportova | 6,326 | 15–4–9–10 | |
| 39 | 27 | Medveščak Zagreb | 0 – 5 | Dynamo Moscow | Arena Zagreb | 15,200 | 15–4–9–11 | |
| 40 | 29 | Medveščak Zagreb | 4 – 2 | Vityaz Podolsk | Arena Zagreb | 15,000 | 16–4–9–11 | |

January: 6–0–2–2 (Home: 3–0–1–1; Road: 3–0–1–1) Pts. 20

| # | Date | Home team | Score | Away team | Arena | Attendance | Record | Recap |
|---|---|---|---|---|---|---|---|---|
| 41 | 4 | Medveščak Zagreb | 1 – 3 | Donbass Donetsk (Ukraine) | Dom sportova | 6,500 | 16–4–9–12 | |
| 42 | 6 | Medveščak Zagreb | 4 – 1 | Dinamo Minsk (Belarus) | Dom sportova | 6,500 | 17–4–9–12 | |
| 43 | 8 | Spartak Moscow | 1 – 3 | Medveščak Zagreb | LDS Sokolniki | 3,385 | 18–4–9–12 | |
| 44 | 14 | Avangard Omsk | 4 – 3 SO | Medveščak Zagreb | Omsk Arena | 7,860 | 18–4–10–12 | |
| 45 | 16 | (Kazakhstan) Barys Astana | 1 – 3 | Medveščak Zagreb | Kazakhstan Sport Palace | 4,070 | 19–4–10–12 | |
| 46 | 18 | Yugra Khanty-Mansiysk | 1 – 4 | Medveščak Zagreb | Arena Ugra | 4,050 | 20–4–10–12 | |
| 47 | 20 | Avtomobilist Yekaterinburg | 2 – 0 | Medveščak Zagreb | KRK Uralets | 5,500 | 20–4–10–13 | |
| 48 | 23 | Medveščak Zagreb | 4 – 2 | Atlant Mytishchi | Arena Zagreb | 11,340 | 21–4–10–13 | |
| 49 | 25 | Medveščak Zagreb | 1 – 0 | Lokomotiv Yaroslavl | Arena Zagreb | 15,200 | 22–4–10–13 | |
| 50 | 27 | Medveščak Zagreb | 1 – 2 SO | Severstal Cherepovets | Arena Zagreb | 13,200 | 22–4–11–13 | |

February: 1–0–0–1 (Home: 0–0–0–0; Road: 1–0–0–1) Pts. 3

| # | Date | Home team | Score | Away team | Arena | Attendance | Record | Recap |
|---|---|---|---|---|---|---|---|---|
| 51 | 26 | (Latvia) Dinamo Riga | 5 – 1 | Medveščak Zagreb | Arena Riga | 7,350 | 22–4–11–14 | |
| 52 | 28 | CSKA Moscow | 1 – 3 | Medveščak Zagreb | CSKA Ice Palace | 4,200 | 23–4–11–14 | |

March: 1–0–1–0 (Home: 0–0–0–0; Road: 1–0–1–0) Pts. 4

| # | Date | Home team | Score | Away team | Arena | Attendance | Record | Recap |
|---|---|---|---|---|---|---|---|---|
| 53 | 2 | (Czech Republic) Lev Praha | 2 - 1 OT | Medveščak Zagreb | Tipsport Arena | 5,124 | 23–4–12–14 | |
| 54 | 4 | (Slovakia) Slovan Bratislava | 2 - 3 | Medveščak Zagreb | Slovnaft Arena | 10,055 | 24–4–12–14 | |

Win (3 points) Overtime/shootout win (2 points) Overtime/shootout loss (1 point) Loss (0 points)

=== Playoffs ===
2014 Gagarin Cup Playoffs
Western Conference Quarter-finals - #3 Lev Praha vs. #6 Medveščak Zagreb

| # | Date | Home team | Score | Away team | Arena | Attendance | Series | Recap |
|---|---|---|---|---|---|---|---|---|
| 1 | March 7 | (Czech Republic) Lev Praha | 4 - 3 | Medveščak Zagreb | Tipsport Arena | 4,157 | 0 - 1 | |
| 2 | March 8 | (Czech Republic) Lev Praha | 5 - 2 | Medveščak Zagreb | Tipsport Arena | 4,555 | 0 - 2 | |
| 3 | March 10 | Medveščak Zagreb | 2 - 5 | (Czech Republic) Lev Praha | Dom sportova | 6,500 | 0 - 3 | |
| 4 | March 11 | Medveščak Zagreb | 2 - 3 | (Czech Republic) Lev Praha | Dom sportova | 6,500 | 0 - 4 | |

Win Loss

== Standings ==
Source: khl.ru

=== Bobrov Division ===
| R | | GP | W | OTW | SOW | SOL | OTL | L | GF | GA | Pts |
|---|---|---|---|---|---|---|---|---|---|---|---|
| 1 | (Russia) SKA Saint Petersburg | 54 | 30 | 1 | 4 | 4 | 1 | 14 | 175 | 115 | 105 |
| 2 | (Czech Republic) Lev Praha | 54 | 23 | 3 | 9 | 2 | 4 | 13 | 149 | 107 | 99 |
| 3 | (Latvia) Dinamo Riga | 54 | 22 | 5 | 6 | 4 | 1 | 16 | 141 | 122 | 93 |
| 4 | (Croatia) Medveščak Zagreb | 54 | 24 | 1 | 3 | 8 | 4 | 14 | 138 | 126 | 92 |
| 5 | (Russia) CSKA Moscow | 54 | 25 | 2 | 5 | 1 | 1 | 20 | 130 | 118 | 91 |
| 6 | (Slovakia) Slovan Bratislava | 54 | 15 | 3 | 6 | 3 | 1 | 26 | 120 | 160 | 67 |
| 7 | (Belarus) Dinamo Minsk | 54 | 13 | 1 | 3 | 4 | 2 | 31 | 102 | 161 | 53 |

=== Western Conference ===
| R | | Div | GP | W | OTW | SOW | SOL | OTL | L | GF | GA | Pts |
|---|---|---|---|---|---|---|---|---|---|---|---|---|
| 1 | (Russia) Dynamo Moscow * | TAR | 54 | 34 | 2 | 2 | 5 | 0 | 11 | 171 | 113 | 115 |
| 2 | (Russia) SKA Saint Petersburg * | BOB | 54 | 30 | 1 | 4 | 4 | 1 | 14 | 175 | 115 | 105 |
| 3 | (Czech Republic) Lev Praha | BOB | 54 | 23 | 3 | 9 | 2 | 4 | 13 | 149 | 107 | 99 |
| 4 | (Ukraine) Donbass Donetsk | TAR | 54 | 27 | 3 | 4 | 2 | 0 | 18 | 135 | 99 | 97 |
| 5 | (Latvia) Dinamo Riga | BOB | 54 | 22 | 5 | 6 | 4 | 1 | 16 | 141 | 122 | 93 |
| 6 | (Croatia) Medveščak Zagreb | BOB | 54 | 24 | 1 | 3 | 8 | 4 | 14 | 138 | 126 | 92 |
| 7 | (Russia) CSKA Moscow | BOB | 54 | 25 | 2 | 5 | 1 | 1 | 20 | 130 | 118 | 91 |
| 8 | (Russia) Lokomotiv Yaroslavl | TAR | 54 | 23 | 2 | 3 | 4 | 1 | 21 | 109 | 103 | 84 |
| 9 | (Russia) Atlant Mytishchi | TAR | 54 | 19 | 1 | 7 | 3 | 2 | 22 | 123 | 120 | 78 |
| 10 | (Russia) Severstal Cherepovets | TAR | 54 | 20 | 0 | 5 | 5 | 2 | 22 | 128 | 135 | 77 |
| 11 | (Slovakia) Slovan Bratislava | BOB | 54 | 15 | 3 | 6 | 3 | 1 | 26 | 120 | 160 | 67 |
| 12 | (Russia) Spartak Moscow | TAR | 54 | 12 | 4 | 4 | 4 | 2 | 28 | 105 | 147 | 58 |
| 13 | (Russia) Vityaz Podolsk | TAR | 54 | 12 | 1 | 5 | 9 | 1 | 26 | 110 | 147 | 58 |
| 14 | (Belarus) Dinamo Minsk | BOB | 54 | 13 | 1 | 3 | 4 | 2 | 31 | 102 | 161 | 53 |

*– Division leader;
BOB – Bobrov Division, TAR – Tarasov Division

== Roster ==
Updated February 15, 2017.

| No. | Nat | Player | Pos | S/G | Age | Acquired | Birthplace |
|---|---|---|---|---|---|---|---|
| 50 | (Croatia) | Ivan Janković | C | L | 31 | 2015 | Zagreb, Croatia |
| 55 | (Croatia) | Matija Miličić | W | L | 30 | 2015 | Zagreb, Croatia |
