= Stulov =

Stulov (Russian: Стулов, from стул meaning a chair) is a Russian masculine surname, its feminine counterpart is Stulova. It may refer to

- Dmitri Stulov (born 1973), Russian ice hockey defenceman
- Dmitri Stulov Jr. (born 1994), Russian ice hockey defenceman, son of Dmitri
- Yuriy Stulov (born 1980), Kazakhstani volleyball player
