= 2011 Junior Club World Cup =

Youth ice hockey tournament

Tournament details
- Host country: Russia
- Venue(s): Omsk Arena & Blinov Sports and Concerts Complex, Omsk
- Dates: 30 August – 3 September 2011
- Teams: 8

Final positions
- Champions: (Russia) Krasnaya Armiya (1st title)
- Runners-up: (Czech Republic) Energie Karlovy Vary

Tournament statistics
- Games played: 13
- Goals scored: 80 (6.15 per game)
- Scoring leader(s): (Latvia) Miks Indrašis, (Latvia) Roberts Bukarts (8 points)

The 2011 Junior Club World Cup was the 1st Junior Club World Cup, an annual international ice hockey tournament. It took place between 30 August–3 September 2011 in Omsk, Russia.

== Teams ==
The list of teams that have been confirmed for the tournament are as listed:

=== Group A ===
- (Russia) Krasnaya Armiya (host)
- (Latvia) HK Rīga
- (Slovakia) Tatranskí vlci
- (United States) EJHL All–Stars

=== Group B ===
- (Belarus) Dinamo-Shinnik
- (Canada) Fort McMurray Oil Barons
- (Czech Republic) HC Energie Karlovy Vary
- (Sweden) Malmö Redhawks

== Group stage ==
=== Key ===
- W (regulation win) – 3 pts.
- OTW (overtime/shootout win) – 2 pts.
- OTL (overtime/shootout loss) – 1 pt.
- L (regulation loss) – 0 pts.

==== Group A ====
Team	Pld	W	OTW	OTL	L	GF	GA	GD	Pts	Qualification
(Russia) Krasnaya Armiya	3	2	0	0	1	13	6	+7	6	Advanced to the Final
(Latvia) HK Rīga	3	2	0	0	1	12	4	+8	6	
(United States) EJHL All Stars	3	2	0	0	1	12	13	−1	6	
(Slovakia) Tatranskí vlci	3	0	0	0	3	5	19	−14	0	

August 30, 2011	EJHL All Stars (United States)	4–2 (1–1, 3–1, 0–0)	(Latvia) HK Rīga

August 30, 2011	Krasnaya Armiya (Russia)	4–3 (2–0, 2–0, 0–3)	(Slovakia) Tatranskí vlci

August 31, 2011	Tatranskí vlci (Slovakia)	2–7 (1–2, 0–2, 1–3)	(United States) EJHL All Stars

August 31, 2011	HK Rīga (Latvia)	2–0 (0–0, 1–0, 1–0)	(Russia) Krasnaya Armiya

September 2, 2011	HK Rīga (Latvia)	8–0 (1–0, 5–0, 2–0)	(Slovakia) Tatranskí vlci

September 2, 2011	Krasnaya Armiya (Russia)	9–1 (4–0, 3–0, 2–1)	(United States) EJHL All Stars

==== Group B ====
Team	Pld	W	OTW	OTL	L	GF	GA	GD	Pts	
(Czech Republic) HC Energie Karlovy Vary	3	3	0	0	0	9	1	+8	9	Advanced to the Final
(Belarus) Dinamo-Shinnik	3	1	1	0	1	9	6	+3	5	
(Sweden) Malmö Redhawks	3	1	0	1	1	8	12	−4	4	
(Canada) Fort McMurray Oil Barons	3	0	0	0	3	3	10	−7	0	

August 30, 2011	HC Energie Karlovy Vary (Czech Republic)	4–0 (3–0, 1–0, 0–0)	(Sweden) Malmö Redhawks

August 30, 2011	Fort McMurray Oil Barons (Canada)	0–3 (0–0, 0–0, 0–3)	(Belarus) Dinamo-Shinnik

August 31, 2011	Dinamo-Shinnik (Belarus)	0–1 (0–1, 0–0, 0–0)	(Czech Republic) HC Energie Karlovy Vary

August 31, 2011	Malmö Redhawks (Sweden)	3–2 (1–0, 1–1, 1–1)	(Canada) Fort McMurray Oil Barons

September 2, 2011	Malmö Redhawks (Sweden)	5–6 (3–1, 0–2, 2–2) (OT: 0–0) (SO: 0–1)	(Belarus) Dinamo-Shinnik

September 2, 2011	Fort McMurray Oil Barons (Canada)	1–4 (1–0, 0–2, 0–2)	(Czech Republic) HC Energie Karlovy Vary

== Final Game ==
September 3, 2011	Krasnaya Armiya (Russia)	7–2 (3–0, 3–1, 1–1)	(Czech Republic) HC Energie Karlovy Vary

== Statistics ==
=== Scoring leaders ===
List shows the top skaters sorted by points, then goals.

Player	Team	GP	G	A	Pts	+/−	PIM	POS
(Latvia) Miks Indrašis	HK Rīga	3	5	3	8	+6	2	F
(Latvia) Roberts Bukarts	HK Rīga	3	4	4	8	+6	0	F
(Russia) Mikhail Plotnikov	Krasnaya Armiya	4	4	3	7	+5	2	F
(Russia) Andrei Sergeyev	Krasnaya Armiya	4	2	4	6	+2	4	D
(Sweden) Joel Kellman	Malmö Redhawks	3	3	2	5	+1	5	F

GP = Games played; G = Goals; A = Assists; Pts = Points; +/− = Plus/Minus; PIM = Penalties In Minutes; POS = Position
Source: mhl.khl.ru.com

== Top Players ==
The following players were chosen as best in their position.

Position	Name	Team
Forward	Roman Lyubimov	(Russia) Krasnaya Armiya
Defense	Andrei Sergeyev	(Russia) Krasnaya Armiya
Goalie	Kristers Gudlevskis	(Latvia) HK Riga
Top Scorer	Miks Indrasis	(Latvia) HK Riga
