= Miks Indrašis =

Latvian ice hockey player (born 1990)

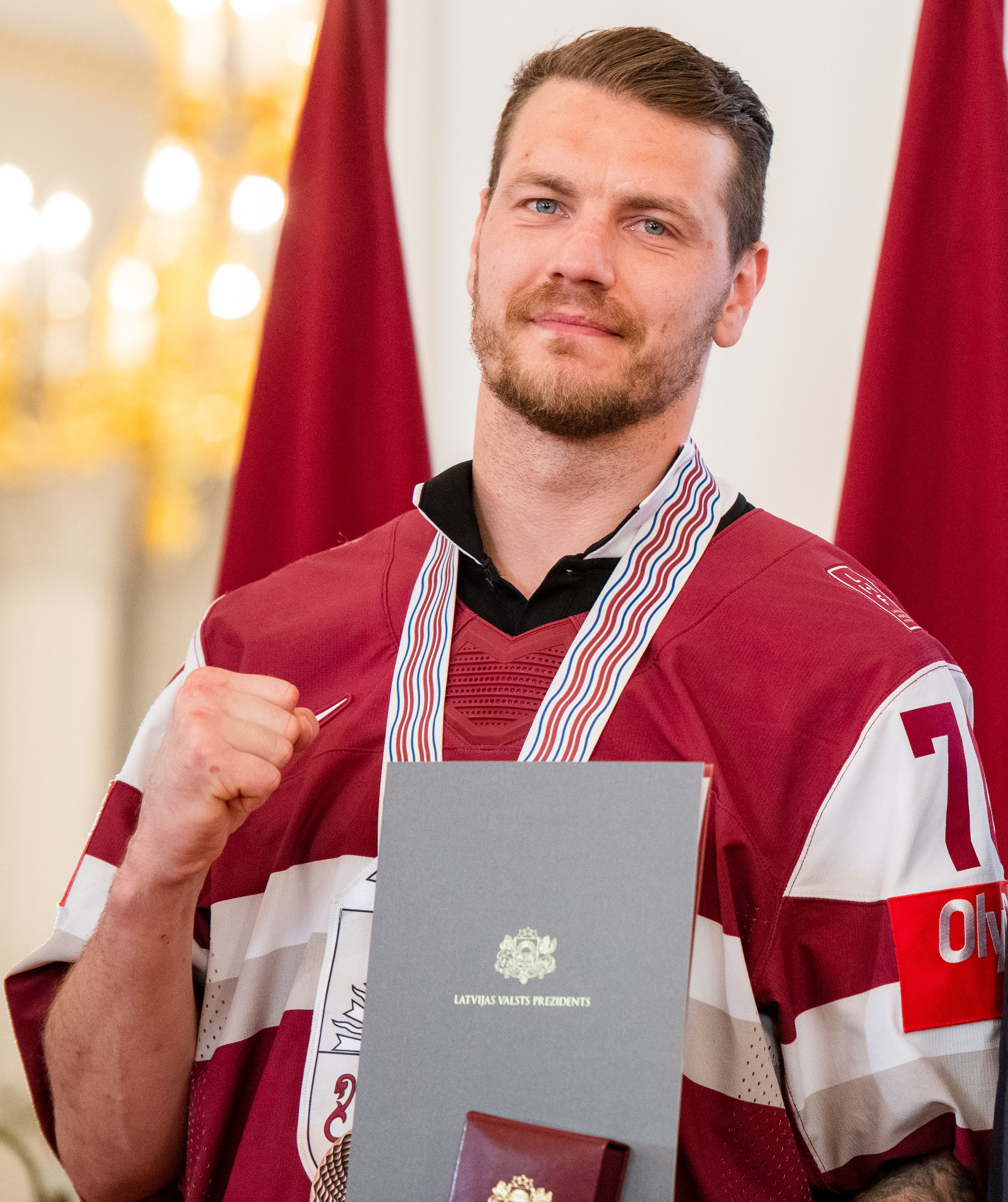
- Miks Indrašis, 2023
- Born: 30 September 1990 (age 35) Riga, Latvia
- Height: 191 cm (6 ft 3 in)
- Weight: 85 kg (187 lb; 13 st 5 lb)
- Position: Winger
- Shoots: Left
- Slovak team Former teams: HC 21 Prešov; Dinamo Riga; Dynamo Moscow; HC Vityaz; Admiral Vladivostok; EHC Biel; Schwenninger Wild Wings; Brynäs IF; BK Mladá Boleslav
- National team: Latvia
- Playing career: 2012–present

Miks Indrašis (born 30 September 1990) is a Latvian professional ice hockey player who is a winger for HC 21 Prešov of the Slovak Extraliga.

== Playing career ==
=== Junior ===
Indrašis began playing hockey in Latvian minor and youth leagues. During this period he played for Liepājas Metalurgs youth team and SK LSPA/Riga.

During the 2009–10 season, he played with Dinamo Juniors Riga. When in 2010 HK Rīga a Minor Hockey League affiliate of Dinamo Rīga was founded, the team was assembled mostly from Dinamo Juniors Riga players. Indrašis had a productive 2010–11 season with HK Rīga, scoring 21 goals and 53 points in 56 games.

=== Professional ===
Indrašis split 2011–12 season between HK Rīga in MHL, HK Liepājas Metalurgs in Belarusian Extraleague and Dinamo Rīga in KHL.

On 2 October 2011, Indrašis received his second recall to Dinamo Riga and made his debut in the Kontinental Hockey League (KHL) on 5 October 2011 in a game against HC Spartak Moscow. However his break came when Ted Nolan selected Indrašis for 2012 World Championship roster. He played the tournament on the first line along with Jānis Sprukts and Miķelis Rēdlihs, scoring three goals and 5 points in 7 games.

After the breakthrough in world championships, Indrašis signed a three-year contract with Dinamo Rīga. At the start of the season, Indrašis continued to show his scoring touch, but his production decreased in the middle of the season. At this point, Indrašis was sent affiliate team. Later, he was recalled and spent the rest of the season with Dinamo.

Indrašis went to NHL Chicago Blackhawks and Vancouver Canucks summer camps in 2012 and 2013 respectively.

After two productive seasons with Dynamo Moscow, Indrašis returned to Dinamo Riga by signing a one-year contract on 28 July 2020. In the 2020–21 season, Indrašis led the club in scoring across all categories with 16 goals, 23 assists and 39 points through 49 regular season games.

Indrašis again left Dinamo as a free agent, remaining in the KHL by agreeing to a contract with HC Vityaz on 18 May 2021.

After splitting the 2021–22 season between Vityaz and Admiral Vladivostok, posting a combined 17 points through 46 games, Indrašis continued his season in moving to the Swiss National League, agreeing to a contract with EHC Biel on 15 February 2022.

On 25 July 2022, Indrašis signed a one-year contract with German club Schwenninger Wild Wings of the DEL for the 2022–23 season.

In 2023, Indrasis joined Brynäs IF Sweden club to play in HockeyAllsvenskan (the second-highest ice hockey league in Sweden after SHL), where the club won the championship for the 2023–24 season. In the following 2024–25 season, he helped propel the club to finish the regular season on top, a feat achieved for the first time in over 40 years, before losing in the Championship finals.

== International play ==
Medal record

Representing Latvia

Ice hockey

World Championships
Bronze medal – third place	2023 Finland/Latvia	

Indrašis was selected to make his debut for the Latvian national team in the 2012 IIHF World Championship Stockholm Sweden. His debut came on 5 May 2012, and he scored the 1–0 goal in that game (although Latvia went on to lose 2–5 against Russia). He continued to have a successful tournament becoming the top scorer of the tournament for team Latvia. and was selected as one of the best players of team Latvia in the tournament. Indrašis was again selected for 2013 World Championship roster for Latvia, but had a less productive tournament registering only one assist in 7 games.

He represented Latvia at the 2023 IIHF World Championship where he recorded two goals and four assists and won a bronze medal, Latvia's first ever IIHF World Championship medal.

== Career statistics ==
=== Regular season and playoffs ===
			Regular season					Playoffs
Season	Team	League	GP	G	A	Pts	PIM	GP	G	A	Pts	PIM
2005–06	HK Liepājas Metalurgs	LAT	—	0	1	1	0	—	—	—	—	—
2006–07	HK Liepājas Metalurgs	LAT U18	—	10	16	26	36	—	—	—	—	—
2007–08	SK Rīga 18	LAT U18	24	30	25	55	56	—	—	—	—	—
2008–09	SK LSPA/Rīga	LAT U20	10	5	8	13	12	—	—	—	—	—
2008–09	SK LSPA/Rīga	LAT	21	14	11	25	35	—	—	—	—	—
2008–09	HK Rīga 2000	LAT	—	—	—	—	—	8	2	1	3	0
2008–09	HK Rīga 2000	BLR	19	2	2	4	2	—	—	—	—	—
2009–10	HK Dinamo/Juniors	BLR	49	20	19	39	28	—	—	—	—	—
2009–10	HK Dinamo/Juniors	LAT	—	—	—	—	—	8	1	3	4	4
2010–11	HK Rīga	MHL	56	21	32	53	26	3	1	2	3	0
2011–12	HK Liepājas Metalurgs	BLR	27	5	11	16	14	—	—	—	—	—
2011–12	Dinamo Rīga	KHL	1	0	0	0	0	—	—	—	—	—
2011–12	HK Rīga	MHL	20	12	9	21	30	5	3	3	6	4
2011–12	HK Juniors Rīga	LAT	—	—	—	—	—	2	1	1	2	0
2012–13	Dinamo Rīga	KHL	43	14	12	26	15	—	—	—	—	—
2012–13	HK Liepājas Metalurgs	BLR	2	0	2	0	0	—	—	—	—	—
2013–14	Dinamo Rīga	KHL	49	12	19	31	18	—	—	—	—	—
2014–15	Dinamo Rīga	KHL	59	16	15	31	12	—	—	—	—	—
2015–16	Dinamo Rīga	KHL	58	14	19	33	26	—	—	—	—	—
2016–17	Dinamo Rīga	KHL	53	11	12	23	20	—	—	—	—	—
2017–18	Dinamo Rīga	KHL	56	21	21	42	36	—	—	—	—	—
2018–19	Dynamo Moscow	KHL	55	16	15	31	18	11	1	4	5	2
2019–20	Dynamo Moscow	KHL	41	6	18	24	6	3	0	0	0	0
2020–21	Dinamo Rīga	KHL	49	16	23	39	20	—	—	—	—	—
2021–22	HC Vityaz	KHL	26	4	8	12	4	—	—	—	—	—
2021–22	Admiral Vladivostok	KHL	20	3	2	5	12	—	—	—	—	—
2021–22	EHC Biel	NL	8	0	2	2	10	3	0	0	0	0
2022–23	Schwenninger Wild Wings	DEL	53	9	20	29	4	—	—	—	—	—
2023–24	Brynäs IF	Allsv	52	26	32	58	16	13	3	9	12	8
2024–25	Brynäs IF	SHL	48	6	23	29	14	17	1	3	4	4
KHL totals			510	133	164	297	173	14	1	4	5	2

=== International ===
Year	Team	Event	Result	GP	G	A	Pts	PIM
2008	Latvia	U18 D1	13th	5	2	4	6	2
2010	Latvia	WJC	9th	6	1	2	3	8
2012	Latvia	WC	10th	7	3	2	5	2
2013	Latvia	OGQ	Q	3	1	1	2	0
2013	Latvia	WC	11th	7	0	1	1	0
2014	Latvia	OG	8th	5	0	0	0	2
2014	Latvia	WC	11th	7	2	2	4	2
2015	Latvia	WC	13th	5	0	0	0	0
2016	Latvia	WC	13th	7	1	1	2	2
2017	Latvia	OGQ	DNQ	3	2	3	5	0
2017	Latvia	WC	10th	7	2	2	4	4
2018	Latvia	WC	8th	8	0	5	5	2
2019	Latvia	WC	10th	7	3	4	7	4
2021	Latvia	WC	11th	7	2	0	2	6
2021	Latvia	OGQ	Q	3	3	1	4	0
2022	Latvia	OG	11th	3	1	0	1	2
2023	Latvia	WC	3rd place, bronze medalist(s)	10	2	4	6	2
2024	Latvia	WC	9th	7	0	3	3	2
2024	Latvia	OGQ	Q	3	1	1	2	0
Junior totals				11	3	6	9	10
Senior totals				99	23	30	53	30
