= Krasnaya Armiya (JHL) =

Russian junior ice hockey club based in Moscow, Russia

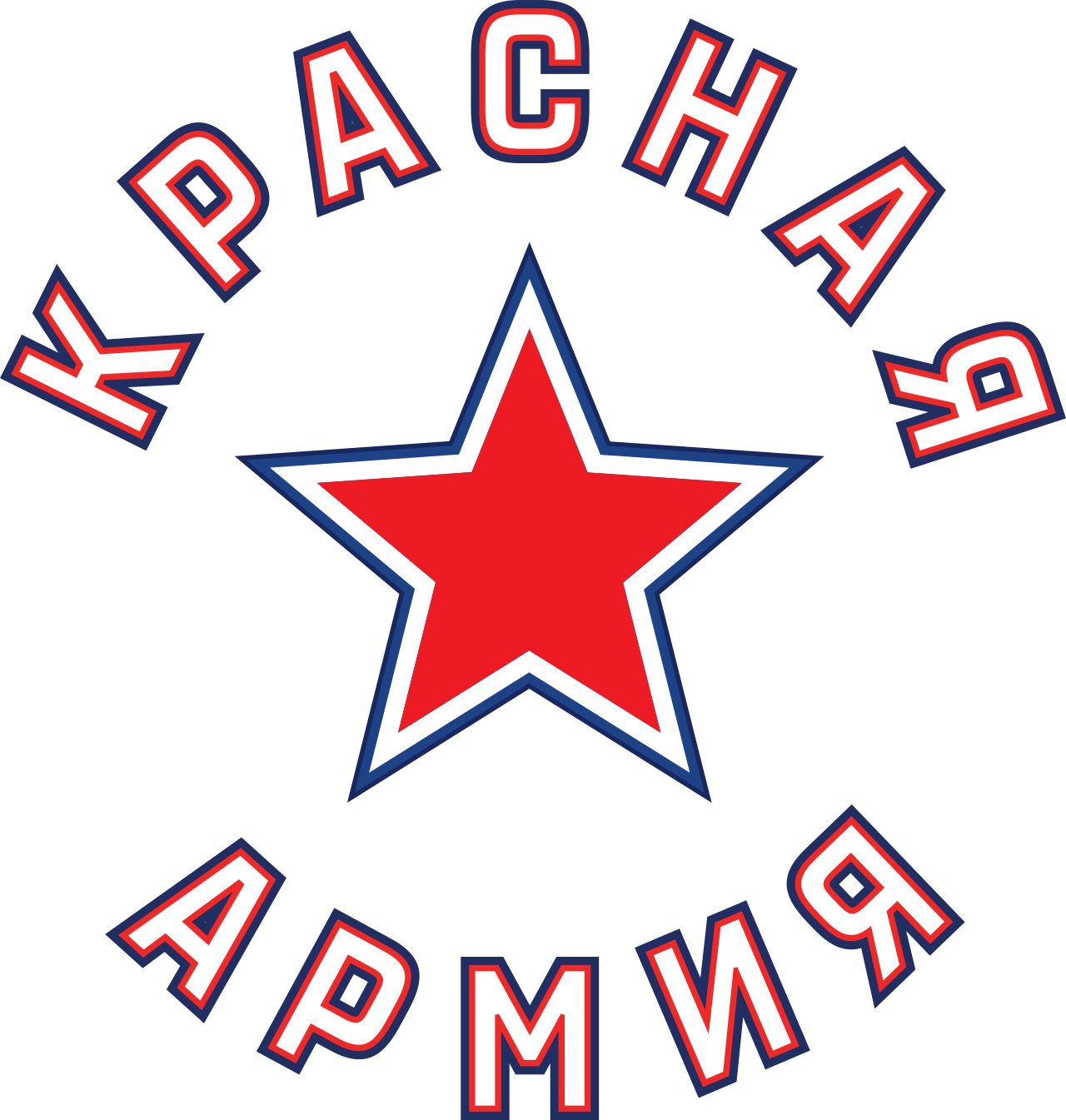
- City: Moscow, Russia
- League: MHL
- Conference: Western Conference
- Founded: 2009
- Home arena: CSKA Ice Palace (capacity: 5,600)
- Colours
- Head coach: Pavel Baulin
- Affiliates: CSKA Moscow (KHL); Zvezda Moscow (VHL)
- Website: redarmy.cska-hockey.ru

Franchise history
- 2009–present: Krasnaya Armiya

Hockey Club Krasnaya Armiya Moscow (Russian: Хоккейный клуб "Красная Армия") or Red Army, is a Russian junior ice hockey club based in Moscow, Russia. They are members of the Western Conference in the Junior Hockey League (MHL), the junior league of the KHL. The name was chosen by fan vote.

The club has won the Kharlamov Cup twice, in 2010–11 and 2016–17 seasons.

== Season-by-season record ==
=== Playoffs ===
- 2009–10 — Lost in 1/8 Finals, 2–3 (Irbis)
- 2010–11 — Won Kharlamov Cup, 4:0 (Stalnye Lisy)
- 2011–12 — Lost in Kharlamov Cup Finals, 1-4 (Omsk Hawks)
- 2012–13 — Did not qualify
- 2013–14 — Lost in Kharlamov Cup Finals, 3-4 (Spartak)
- 2014–15 — Lost in Conference quarterfinals, 0–3 (SKA-1946)
- 2015–16 — Lost in Conference quarterfinals, 1-3 (Loko Yaroslavl)
- 2016–17 — Won Kharlamov Cup, 4:0 (Reaktor)
- 2017–18 — Lost in Conference quarterfinals, 1–3 (Dinamo Saint Petersburg)
- 2018–19 — Lost in Conference quarterfinals, 2–3 (Almaz Cherepovets)

== Honours ==
=== Domestic (MHL) ===
Kharlamov Cup

- (gold) Winners (2): 2010–11, 2016-17
- (silver) Runners-up (2): 2011-12, 2013-14

Viacheslav Fetisov Award

- Alexey Marchenko: 2010-11

Vladimir Yurzinov Award

- Vyacheslav Butsaev: 2010-11

Vitaly Davydov Award

- Nikita Gusev (2): 2010-11, 2011-12

=== International ===
Junior Club World Cup

- (gold) Winners (2): 2011, 2017

== See also ==
- HC CSKA Moscow
- Zvezda Moscow
- MHL
