= HC Zvezda Moscow =

Zvezda Moscow
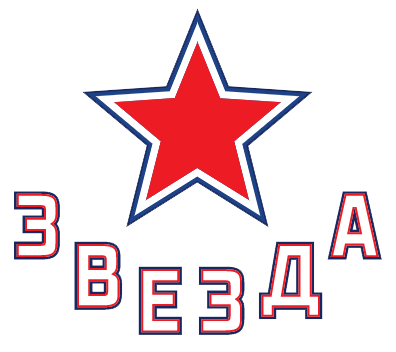
- City: Moscow, Russia
- League: VHL
- Founded: 2015
- Home arena: CSKA Ice Palace (capacity: 5600)
- Colours
- Head coach: Rinat Khasanov
- Parent club: CSKA Moscow (KHL)
- Farm club: Krasnaya Armiya (MHL)
- Website: http://star.cska-hockey.ru

Zvezda Moscow (Russian: Звезда Москва) is a Russian ice hockey team based in Moscow, Russia. Founded in 2015, they are members in the Supreme Hockey League (VHL). They act as farm team of the KHL side CSKA Moscow.

Their home arena is the CSKA Ice Palace in Moscow. Until the end of the 2017–18 season, the team was based in the city of Chekhov, Moscow Region.

== History ==
Zvezda's inaugural season in the VHL was not particularly successful, as they finished 21st out of 26 teams. The teams sophomore season would be more successful however, as they finished 14th, qualifying for the playoffs before losing to Saryarka Karaganda in the first round. Former Chicago Blackhawk and Olympic Silver Medalist Boris Mironov was announced as Zvezda's new head coach, having previously held the same position of the CSKA Moscow MHL affiliate Krasnaya Armiya.

In 2017–18 season the team finished at the 11th place of the regular season, and in 1/8 Finals lost 0:4 to Zauralie Kurgan. The next season the team reached the Quarterfinals for the first time in history, losing to Rubin Tyumen.

== Honours ==
=== Supreme Hockey League (VHL) ===
(gold) Silk Road Cup (1): 2019–20

(gold) Regular Season (1): 2019–20

== Season-by-season record ==
=== Playoffs ===
- 2016–17 — Lost in 1/8 finals, 1–4 (Saryarka Karagandy)
- 2017–18 — Lost in 1/8 finals, 0–4 (Zauralie Kurgan)
- 2018–19 — Lost in quarterfinals, 2–4 (Rubin Tyumen)

== Head coaches ==
- (Russia) Sergey Gersonsky (2015 - 2016)
- (Russia) Dmitri Yerofeyev (2016 - 2017)
- (Russia) Boris Mironov (2017 - 2018)
- (Russia) Vladimir Chebaturkin (2018–Present)

== See also ==
- HC CSKA Moscow
- Krasnaya Armiya
- VHL
