= Krasnaya Armiya =

Krasnaya Armiya may refer to:

- The Red Army
- HC CSKA Moscow, a hockey team once affiliated with the Red Army
- Krasnaya Armiya (JHL), a junior hockey team affiliated with CSKA Moscow
