= Dmitri Stulov Jr. =

Russian ice hockey player

Dmitry Stulov
- Born: 2 January 1994 (age 32) Saratov, Russia
- Height: 6 ft 2 in (188 cm)
- Weight: 205 lb (93 kg; 14 st 9 lb)
- Position: Defence
- Shoots: Left
- KHL team: HC Lada Togliatti
- NHL draft: Undrafted
- Playing career: 2013–present

Dmitry Stulov (born 2 January 1994) is a Russian professional ice hockey defenceman. He is currently playing with HC Lada Togliatti of the Kontinental Hockey League (KHL).

Stulov made his Kontinental Hockey League debut playing with HC Lada Togliatti during the 2014–15 KHL season.

== Personal ==
His father Dmitri Stulov (born 1973) is the head coach of Sarmaty Orenburzhya of the Russian under-18 Junior Hockey League.
