= Junior Club World Cup =

The Junior Club World Cup (JCWC) (Russian: Кубок Мира среди молодежных клубных команд, Kubok Mira sredi molodezhnykh klubnykh komand) is an international junior ice hockey tournament sanctioned by IIHF. The first edition of the tournament took place between 30 August 2011 and 3 September 2011 in Omsk. It featured 8 teams from 8 countries.

== History ==
The first Junior Club World Cup took place in Omsk, Russia, in 2011. The first tournament was won by the Minor Hockey League's Krasnaya Armiya. They defeated Energie Karlovy Vary 7–2 in the final game.

In the second tournament, in 2012, Hockey Canada and USA Hockey both sent a higher calibre of representatives to the event. In the final, the Ontario Hockey League's Sudbury Wolves defeated the United States Hockey League's Waterloo Black Hawks 2–0 in a closely fought championship game.

The 2013 tournament was played again in Omsk, Russia and won by the hometown Omskie Yastreby, defeating Finland's HPK 2-0 in the final. The USHL's Dubuque Fighting Saints won bronze with a 4-1 effort over Dinamo-Shinnik.

== Results by year ==
| Year | (gold) Gold | (silver) Silver | Score | (bronze) Bronze | Fourth | Score | Host | Teams |
|---|---|---|---|---|---|---|---|---|
| 2011 | (Russia) Krasnaya Armiya | (Czech Republic) Energie Karlovy Vary | 7–2 | Third place was not contested. | | | Omsk, Russia | 8 |
| 2012 | (Canada) Sudbury Wolves | (United States) Waterloo Black Hawks | 2–0 | (Sweden) Linköpings HC | (Belarus) Dinamo-Shinnik | 1–0 OT | Omsk, Russia | 10 |
| 2013 | (Russia) Omskie Yastreby | (Finland) HPK | 2–0 | (United States) Dubuque Fighting Saints | (Belarus) Dinamo-Shinnik | 4–1 | Omsk, Russia | 8 |
| 2014 | (Russia) МHC Spartak | (Russia) Tolpar Ufa | 2–1 SO | (United States) Sioux City Musketeers | (Belarus) Dinamo-Shinnik | 4–3 OT | Ufa, Russia | 10 |
| 2015 | (Sweden) Djurgårdens IF | (Russia) Chaika Nizhny Novgorod | 2–1 | (United States) Chicago Steel | (Russia) MHC Avto | 3–2 | Yekaterinburg, Nizhny Tagil, Verkhnyaya Pyshma, Russia | 8 |
| 2016 | (Russia) Loko Yaroslavl | (Russia) Reaktor | 5–1 | (Kazakhstan) Snezhnye Barsy | (Finland) Jokerit U20 | 2–1 | Nizhnekamsk and Naberezhnye Chelny, Russia | 8 |
| 2017 | (Russia) Krasnaya Armiya | (Sweden) Modo | 5–2 | (Czech Republic) Ocelari Trinec | (Kazakhstan) Snezhnye Barsy | 2–1 | Yekaterinburg, Russia | 8 |
| 2018 | (Russia) Loko Yaroslavl | (Sweden) HV71 U20 | 3–2 | (Canada) Ottawa Capitals | (Austria) Salzburg Red Bull | 2–1 SO | Sochi, Russia | 8 |
| 2019 | (Russia) Loko Yaroslavl | (Canada) AJHL All-Star Team | 3–0 | (Finland) Kärpät U20 | (Austria) Salzburg Red Bull | 7–4 | Sochi, Russia | 8 |
