= Dmitri Stulov =

Russian ice hockey player

- Born: 5 September 1973 (age 52) Saratov, Russia
- Height: 5 ft 11 in (180 cm)
- Weight: 198 lb (90 kg; 14 st 2 lb)
- Position: Defence
- Played for: Soviet; Krylya Sovetov Moscow; IHL; Kristall Saratov; RSL; Severstal Cherepovets; Lokomotiv Yaroslavl; HC Lada Togliatti; HC Neftekhimik Nizhnekamsk; HC Sibir Novosibirsk; HC Spartak Moscow
- NHL draft: Undrafted
- Playing career: 1991–2005

Dmitri Stulov (born 5 September 1973) is a Russian former professional ice hockey defenceman. He is currently the head coach of Sarmaty Orenburzhya of the Russian under-20 Junior Hockey League.

== Personal ==
His son Dmitri Stulov Jr. (born 1994) is a defenceman who plays with HC Lada Togliatti of the Kontinental Hockey League (KHL).
