= SKA-1946 =

- City: Saint Petersburg, Russia
- League: MHL
- Conference: Western Conference
- Founded: March 26, 2009
- Home arena: Yubileyny Sports Palace
- Colours
- Affiliates: SKA Saint Petersburg (KHL); SKA-VMF (VHL); Akademiya SKA (MHL)
- Website: 1946.SKA.RU

Franchise history
- 2009–present: SKA-1946

SKA-1946 Saint Petersburg (Russian: Хоккейный клуб "СКА-1946" Санкт-Петербург), is a Russian junior ice hockey club based in Saint Petersburg, Russia. They are members of the Western Conference in the Junior Hockey League (MHL), the junior league of the KHL.

== History ==
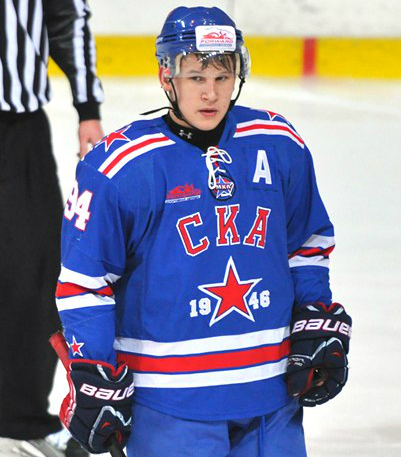
Alexander Barabanov

The club was established in 2009 to participate in the MHL. The club was named SKA-1946 after the establishment year of SKA Saint Petersburg, which the club has considered as one of their affiliates.

In April 2015, the team reached the Kharlamov Cup finals and become the vice-champion for the first time in their history.

== Season-by-season record ==
=== Playoffs ===
- 2009–10 — Lost in 1/8 Finals, 2–3 (Omsk Hawks)
- 2010–11 — Did not qualify
- 2011–12 — Lost in Conference quarterfinals, 2–3 (Krasnaya Armiya)
- 2012–13 — Lost in Conference quarterfinals, 0–3 (MHC Spartak Moscow)
- 2013–14 — Lost in Conference quarterfinals, 0–3 (Krasnaya Armiya)
- 2014–15 — Lost in Kharlamov Cup Finals, 1-4 (Chaika)
- 2015–16 — Lost in 1/8 Finals, 0–3 (Almaz)
- 2016–17 — Lost in Conference quarterfinals, 1-3 (Almaz)
- 2017–18 —

== Head coaches ==
- Ivano Zanatta
- Sergei Pushkov
- Andrei Andreev
- Mikhail Kravetz
- Mikhail Milyokhin

== See also ==
- SKA Saint Petersburg
