= Akademiya SKA =

Akademiya SKA St. Petersburg
- City: Saint Petersburg formerly: Imeni Morozova (2014-2024); Krasnogorsk (2024-2025)
- League: MHL
- Founded: 2014
- Home arena: Khokkeyny Gorod
- Head coach: (Russia) Alexandr Pavlov
- Affiliates: SKA Saint Petersburg (KHL); SKA-VMF (VHL); SKA-1946 (MHL)
- Website: junior.ska.ru

Franchise history
- 2014–2024: SKA-Varyagi Imeni Morozova
- 2024–2025: SKA-Yunior Krasnogorsk
- 2025-present: Akademiya SKA St. Petersburg

Akademiya SKA or SKA Academy (Russian: Академия СКА) is a Russian ice hockey team that plays in the MHL.

It was founded in 2014 on the basis of the Varyagi hockey school. From 2014 to 2024 the team was called Ska-Vayagi (Russian: СКА-Варяги). The team played at the Khors Arena in the village Imeni Morozova, Leningrad Oblast.

In 2024, the team moved to Krasnogorsk, Moscow Oblast, and was renamed the SKA-Yunior (SKA-Junior).

In 2025, the team moved to St. Petersburg, and was renamed the Akademiya SKA (SKA Academy).
