= Kristall Berdsk =

Russian ice hockey team

- City: Berdsk, Russia
- League: Pervaya Liga
- Founded: ?
- Colours: Red, Blue, White

Kristall Berdsk is an ice hockey team in Berdsk, Russia. They play in the Pervaya Liga, the third level of ice hockey in Russia.
