= Viktor Blinov =

Soviet ice hockey player (1945–1968)

- Born: September 1, 1945 Omsk, Russian SFSR, Soviet Union
- Died: July 9, 1968 (aged 22) Moscow, Russian SFSR, Soviet Union
- Height: 5 ft 9 in (175 cm)
- Weight: 181 lb (82 kg; 12 st 13 lb)
- Position: Defence
- Shot: Right
- Played for: HC Spartak Moscow
- National team: Soviet Union
- Playing career: 1963–1968

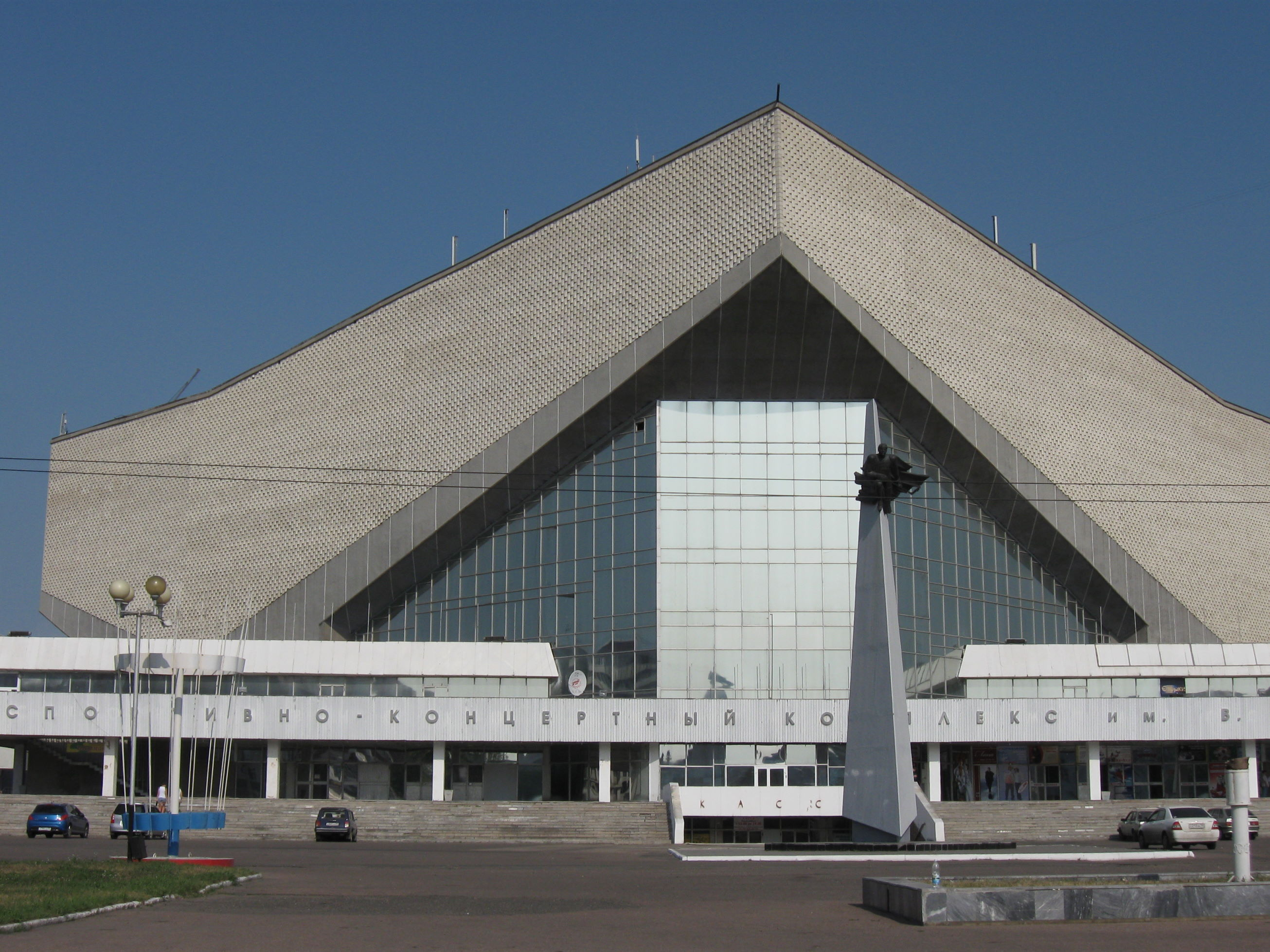
The Arena (Sports and Concert Complex) named after Viktor Blinov in Omsk, Russia. The home arena of ice hockey team Avangard Omsk since 1986 till 2007

Viktor Nikolayevich Blinov (September 1, 1945 in Omsk, Soviet Union – July 9, 1968 in Moscow, Soviet Union) was an ice hockey player who played in the Soviet Hockey League. He played for HC Spartak Moscow. He was inducted into the Russian and Soviet Hockey Hall of Fame in 1968.

He played in his first international on February 26, 1965, against Canada. He won a gold medal in the 1968 Winter Olympics. He scored ten goals in 32 internationals, the last of which was on February 17, 1968.

Blinov died from a heart attack he suffered during hockey practice. He was 22 years old.
