= CSKA Ice Palace =

Indoor arena in Moscow, Russia

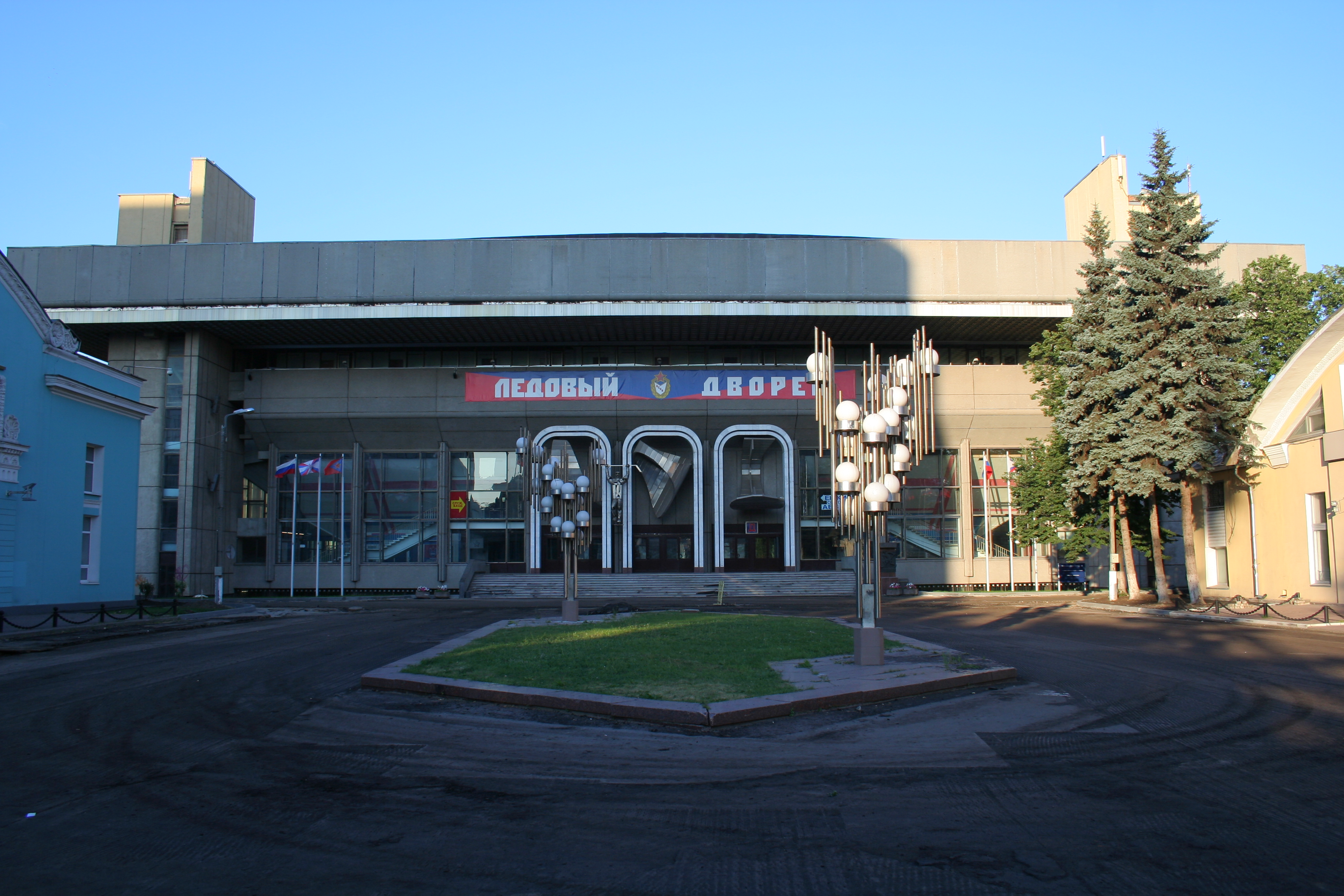
- Interactive map of CSKA Ice Palace
- Full name: CSKA Sports Ice Complex (LSK CSKA)
- Location: Leningradskiy Prospect 39, Moscow, Russia
- Coordinates: 55°47′40.67″N 37°32′17.64″E
- Owner: CSKA Moscow
- Capacity: 5,600
- Surface: 60 x 31 meters

Construction
- Built: 1964
- Renovated: 1991
- Expanded: 1991, 2006
- Closed: 2021
- Demolished: 2021

Tenants
- HC CSKA Moscow (KHL, 1964-2018); Krasnaya Armiya (MHL, since 2015); Zvezda Moscow (VHL, since 2018)

CSKA Ice Palace (Russian: Ледовый Дворец Спорта ЦСКА) was an indoor arena located in Moscow, Russia. The arena's seating capacity was 5,600. The arena was located next to Khodynka Field, and was a part of the CSKA Sports Complex. It was primarily used to host ice hockey games and figure skating competitions.

== History ==
Originally built in 1964, CSKA Ice Palace was heavily renovated and expanded in 1991, and expanded again in 2006. It has been used as the long-time home arena for the ice hockey games of CSKA Moscow. In December 2020, it became known about plans to build a new CSKA sports complex on Leningradsky Prospekt with the support of Rosneft. The arena was demolished in September 2021.

== See also ==
- List of indoor arenas in Russia
