= Kirill Rasskazov =

Russian ice hockey player (born 1992)

- Born: May 3, 1992 (age 34) Omsk, Russia
- Height: 6 ft 1 in (185 cm)
- Weight: 198 lb (90 kg; 14 st 2 lb)
- Position: Forward
- Shoots: Left
- KHL team Former teams: Shanghai Dragons; Avangard Omsk; HC Yugra; Torpedo Nizhny Novgorod; Amur Khabarovsk; Severstal Cherepovets; HC Vityaz; HC Sochi; Sibir Novosibirsk
- Playing career: 2013–present

Kirill Rasskazov (Russian: Кирилл Евгеньевич Рассказов; born May 3, 1992) is a Russian professional ice hockey player for the Shanghai Dragons in the Kontinental Hockey League (KHL).

Rasskazov made his KHL debut with Avangard Omsk during the 2013–14 KHL season.
