= 2010–11 JHL season =

Russian ice hockey league season

The 2010–11 MHL season was the second season of the Junior Hockey League. MHK Red Army won the league title. The league was divided into two conferences, and four divisions. A total of 16 teams, four from each conference, qualified for the playoffs.

== Regular season ==
=== League standings ===
Points are awarded as follows:

- 3 Points for a win in regulation ("W")
- 2 Points for a win in overtime ("OTW") or a penalty shootout ("SOW")
- 1 Point for a loss in overtime ("OTL") or a penalty shootout ("SOL")
- 0 Points for a loss in regulation ("L")

=== Western Conference ===
==== Northwest Division ====
R		GP	W	OTW	SOW	SOL	OTL	L	GF	GA	Pts
1	MHC Khimik	56	31	1	3	5	1	15	170	126	107
2	HK Riga	56	30	1	3	0	1	21	186	141	99
3	Loko	56	27	3	3	4	1	18	190	156	98
4	Almaz	56	26	3	3	1	0	23	209	160	91
8.5
5	SKA-1946	56	22	1	3	6	3	21	151	149	83
6	Minskie Zubry	56	20	3	3	6	3	21	145	165	81
7	Yunost	56	17	3	1	5	4	26	127	186	68
8	Serebryanye Lvy	56	9	0	1	3	2	41	96	232	34

==== Central Division ====
R		GP	W	OTW	SOW	SOL	OTL	L	GF	GA	Pts
1	Krasnaya Armiya	54	30	1	2	1	0	20	222	180	97
2	Amurskie Tigry	54	31	0	1	1	0	21	175	136	96
3	Mytischenskie Atlanty	54	25	4	5	1	1	18	188	151	95
4	Krylya Sovetov	54	22	2	4	2	4	20	175	158	84
8.5
5	MHC Spartak	54	19	3	3	0	3	26	152	174	72
6	Russkie Vityazi	54	19	2	2	2	3	26	175	224	70
7	Sherif	54	18	1	2	5	3	25	131	168	68

=== Eastern Conference ===
==== Volga Division ====
R		GP	W	OTW	SOW	SOL	OTL	L	GF	GA	Pts
1	Tolpar	53	37	0	1	6	2	7	222	106	121
2	Bars	53	27	2	2	1	0	21	177	134	90
3	Belye Tigry	53	26	2	1	2	4	18	187	180	90
4	Reaktor	53	26	2	3	1	0	21	176	171	89
8.5
5	Chaika	53	17	2	4	1	2	27	131	152	66
6	Olympia	53	11	0	1	6	1	34	122	201	42
7	Ladia	53	3	1	3	3	1	42	109	245	21

==== Ural-Sibirian Division ====
R		GP	W	OTW	SOW	SOL	OTL	L	GF	GA	Pts
1	Stalnye Lisy	53	29	3	5	6	0	10	207	151	109
2	Omskye Yastreby	53	30	1	6	1	1	14	183	142	106
3	Avto	53	32	1	2	2	0	16	206	160	104
4	Belye Medvedi	53	28	0	4	2	0	19	185	153	94
8.5
5	MHC Gazovik	53	24	0	4	3	1	21	158	143	84
6	Kuznetskie Medvedi	53	15	0	3	2	1	32	142	174	54
7	Sibirskie Snaypery	53	10	0	3	3	0	37	107	186	39

== Playoffs ==
1/8 Finals	Quarterfinals
NW1	MHC Khimik	3
C4	Krylya Sovetov	0
NW1	MHC Khimik	3
C2	Amurskie Tigry	2
C2	Amurskie Tigry	3
NW3	Loko	0
Western Conference
C1	Krasnaya Armiya	3
NW4	Almaz	2
C1	Krasnaya Armiya	3
C3	Mytischenskie Atlanty	0
NW2	HK Riga	0
C3	Mytischenskie Atlanty	3
V1	Tolpar	3
US4	Belye Medvedi	2
V1	Tolpar	3
V3	Belye Tigry	0
US2	Omskye Yastreby	1
V3	Belye Tigry	3
Eastern Conference
US1	Stalnye Lisy	3
V4	Reaktor	2
US1	Stalnye Lisy	3
US3	Avto	0
V2	Bars Kazan	0
US3	Avto	3

Semifinals
NW1	MHC Khimik	1
C1	Krasnaya Armiya	3
V1	Tolpar	2
US1	Stalnye Lisy	3

Final
C1	Krasnaya Armiya	4
US1	Stalnye Lisy	0
