= Arena Omsk =

Arena in Omsk, Russia

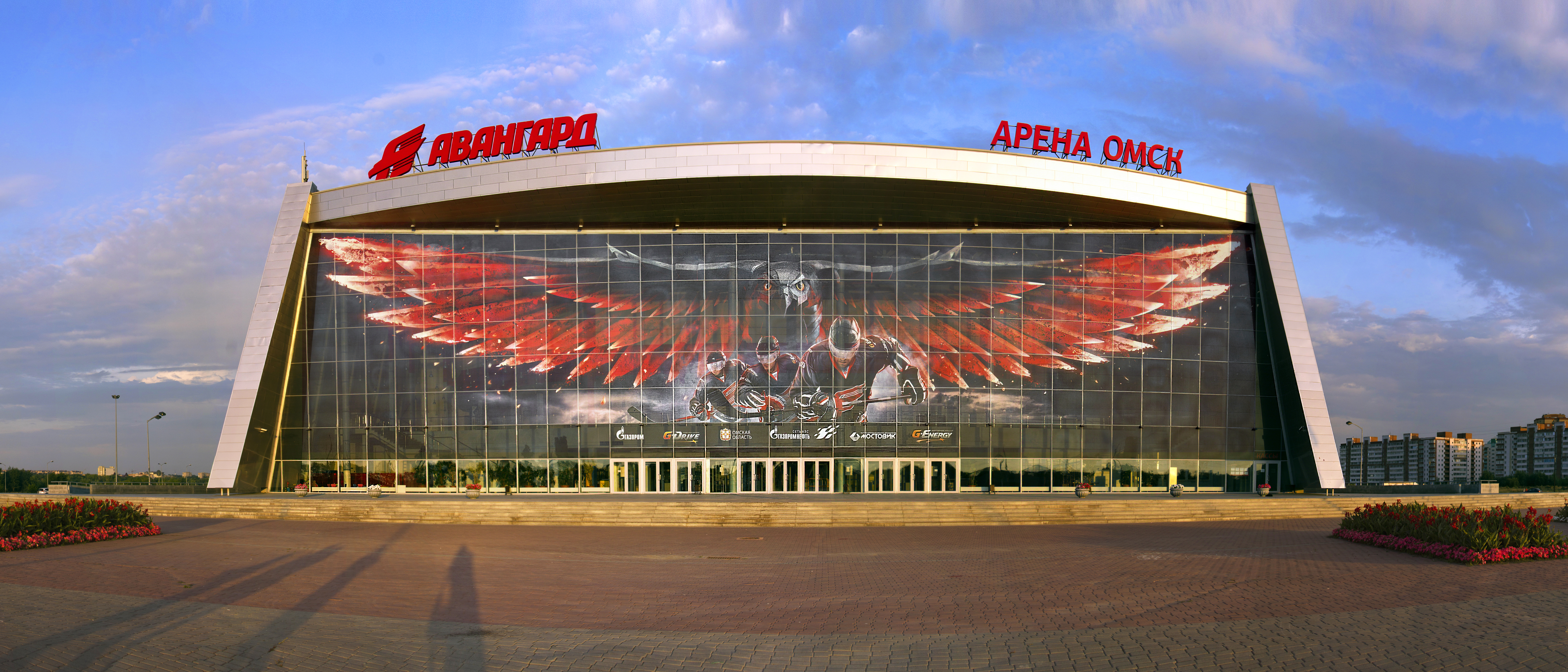
- Interactive map of Arena Omsk
- Location: 35 Lukashevicha Street, Omsk, Russia
- Coordinates: 55°0′31″N 73°17′51″E
- Owner: Avangard Omsk
- Capacity: Ice hockey 10,318; Concerts: 11,000

Construction
- Groundbreaking: 2004
- Opened: August 31, 2007
- Closed: August, 2018
- Demolished: September 11, 2019
- Cost: $150 Million USD
- Architect: AMR

Tenants
- Avangard Omsk (KHL) (2007–2018); Omskie Yastreby (MHL) (2009–2018)

The Arena Omsk was a 10,318-seat multi-purpose arena in Omsk, Russia. It opened in 2007, replacing Sports-Concerts Complex Viktora Blinova as the home of Kontinental Hockey League ice hockey team, Avangard Omsk.

== Construction and opening ==
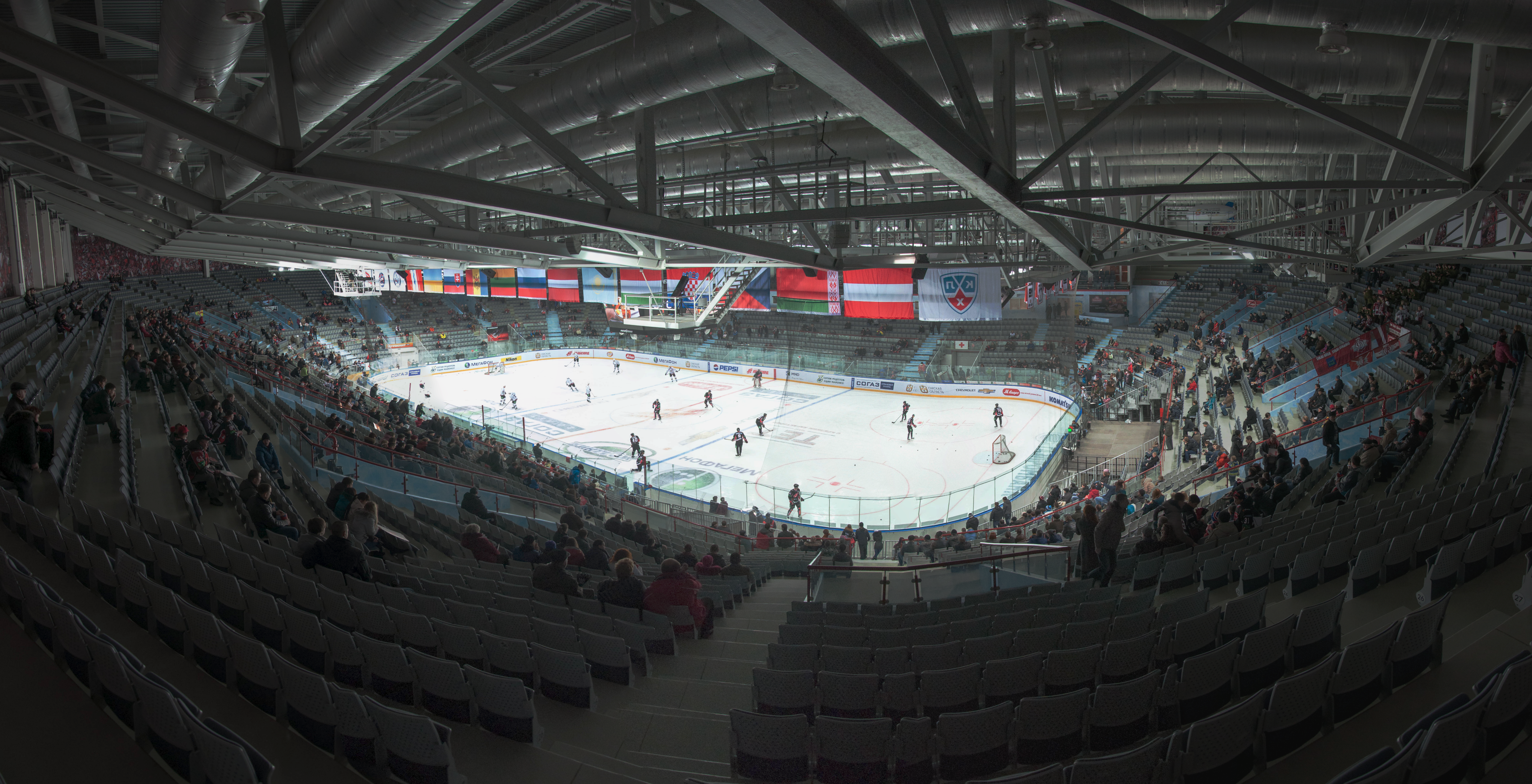
Panoramic view of Omsk Arena

After the arena was designed by Austrian company AMR the construction began on March 16, 2004. On August 31, 2007, the first ice hockey game was played as a part of the 2007 Super Series, a junior hockey challenge between Canada and Russia.

The original owner of the arena was Roman Abramovich, however in 2012 he donated it to Avangard Omsk.

In 2018, the arena was found to be structurally deficient, and had to be demolished. The demolition was completed in September 2019. G-Drive Arena was built in its place and opened in September 2022 for the opening of the KHL 2022–23 season.

== Events ==
- 2007 Super Series
- 2011–2013 World Junior Club Cup
- 2012 Gagarin Cup Finals

== See also ==
- List of European ice hockey arenas
- List of Kontinental Hockey League arenas

Preceded by Blinov Sports and Concerts Complex	Home of Avangard Omsk; 2007–2018	Succeeded by Balashikha Arena
