= Sarmaty Orenburzhya =

Sarmaty Orenburg Сарматы Оренбург
- City: Orenburg, Russia
- League: MHL
- Conference: Eastern
- Founded: 2015
- Home arena: Zvezdny Ice Palace
- Colours
- Head coach: Sergei Lopushansky
- Affiliate: Yuzhny Ural Orsk (VHL)
- Website: Official website

Sarmaty Orenburg (Russian: Сарматы Оренбург) is a junior ice hockey team based in Orenburg, Russia.

Founded in 2015, they play in the Eastern Conference of the Russian under-20 Junior Hockey League (MHL).

== Players ==
Player name	Number	Position
Alexei Golubev	1	Goalkeeper
Timothy Shirgaziev	20	Goalkeeper
Nikita Chentsov	50	Goalkeeper
Sergey Mazhaev	68	Defender
Kirill Gorbunov	54	Defender
Paul Babenko	28	Defender
Dmitriy Fetisov	17	Defender
Kirill Vetrov	7	Defender
Sabir Baykov	8	Defender
Egor Leushin	2	Defender
Danil Novikov	5	Defender
Artem Zhomov	63	Defender
Sergey Bragin	92	Forward
Egor Razumniak	9	Forward
Gleb Kosivanov	11	Forward
Vladislav Rvachev	72	Forward
Michael Pavlenko	18	Forward
Michael Ivanov	13	Forward
Ilya Mayorov	25	Forward
Zakhar Zakharov	33	Forward
Alexander Volokhov	31	Forward
Ilya Sviridenko	15	Forward
Danis Vagapov	47	Forward
Ilya Bobryashov	88	Forward
Egor Ivanov	12	Forward
Paul Meshkov	21	Forward
Ivan Evdokimov	74	Forward
Artem Starovoitov	65	Forward
Danil Borodim	70	Forward
Ivan Znamenshchikov	35	Forward

== Controversy ==
In early 2023, the doctor for the team, Alexander Zhukov, died under suspicious circumstances. While no official cause of death has been published, some suspect that his death may be related to his practices of protesting the Russian invasion of Ukraine.

In January 2023, the former head coach for the team, Vladimir Gromilin, was fired by the team's management for physically abusing a player, Yegor Razumnyak. This comes after a long string of coaches being fired for abuse of the team's young and often underage players. Former head coach Artur Ruslanov was fired in 2019 for allegedly being in a homosexual relationship with then-underage player Samuil Danilov. Ruslanov has not yet faced trial as his trial date was delayed due to the COVID-19 pandemic.
