= JHC Reaktor =

Reaktor Реактор
- City: Nizhnekamsk, Russia
- League: Junior Hockey League
- Conference: Eastern Conference
- Founded: 2009
- Home arena: SCC Arena (capacity: 5,500)
- Colors
- Affiliates: HC Neftekhimik Nizhnekamsk (KHL)
- Website: Official website

Franchise history
- 2009–present: Reaktor

Reaktor (Russian for Reactor) is a junior ice hockey club from Nizhnekamsk, Tatarstan, Russia.

Founded in 2009, they compete in the Eastern Conference of the Junior Hockey League - the top tier of Russian junior hockey. The team's home arena is the SCC Arena, and they are affiliated with the Kontinental Hockey League team HC Neftekhimik Nizhnekamsk.
