= Blinov Sports and Concerts Complex =

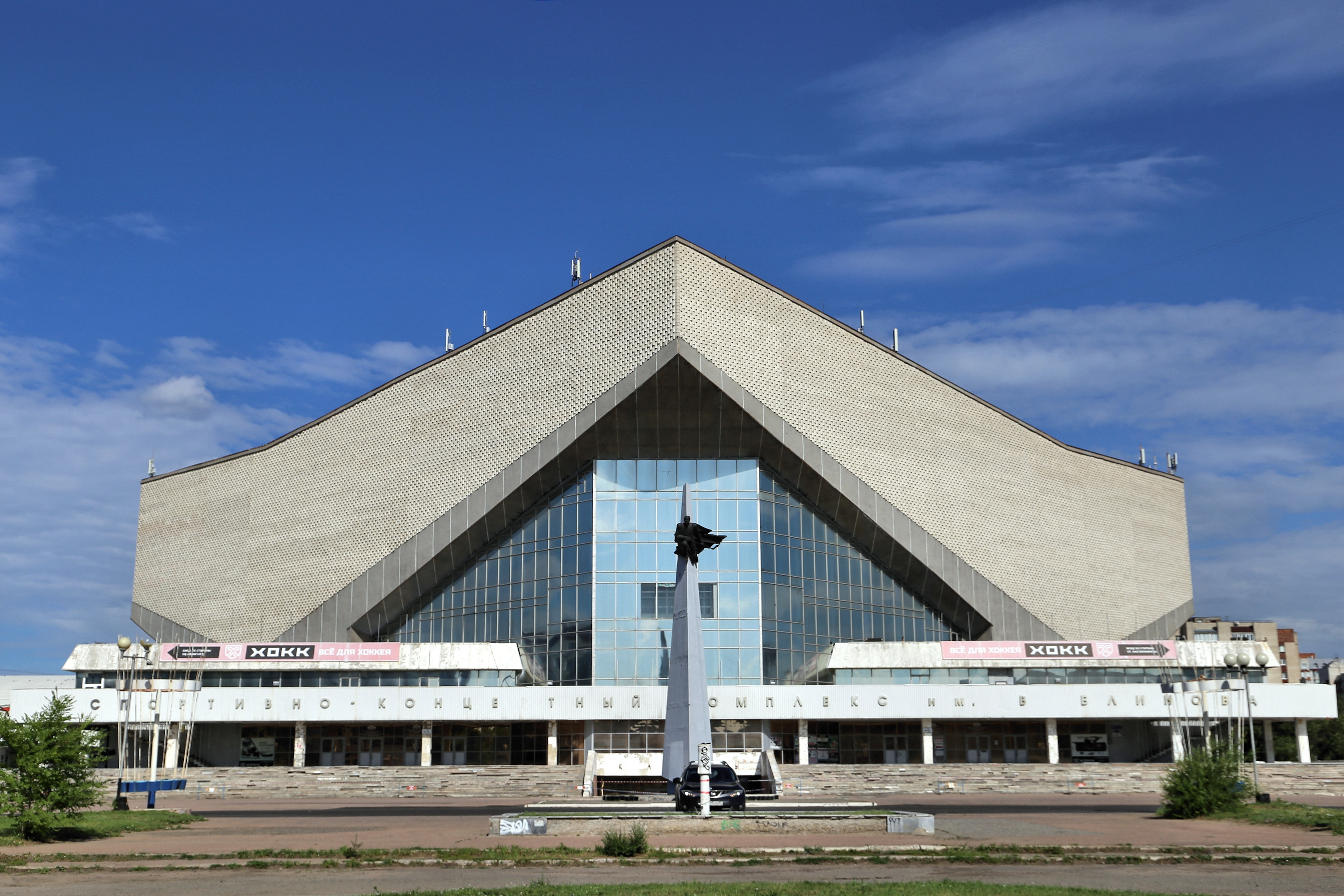
- The Arena named after Viktor Blinov
- Interactive map of Blinov Sports and Concerts Complex
- Full name: Viktor Blinov Sports and Concerts Complex
- Former names: Irtysh Sports and Concert Complex (1986-2001)
- Location: Omsk, Russia
- Coordinates: 54°58′31″N 73°23′48″E
- Capacity: 5,500

Construction
- Opened: 1 November 1986

Tenant
- Avangard Omsk (1987-2007)

Website
- https://www.skkblinova.ru/

Blinov Sports and Concerts Complex (Russian: Спортивно-концертный комплекс им. Виктора Блинова short form: СКК "Блинова" previous name: СКК "Иртыш") is an indoor sporting arena located in Omsk, Russia. The capacity of the arena is 5,500. It was the home arena of the Avangard Omsk ice hockey team since 1987 till 2007. Today it is a home arena of women's volleyball club Omichka and Avangard affiliated MHL-B team Yastreby Omsk.

The construction began back in the 70s, but later was postponed and frozen for several years. The complex was finished only in 1986 and hosted the first hockey games in February 1987. Before 2001 it was called Irtysh Sports and Concert Complex subsequently changing the name to Blinov Sports and Concert Complex after Viktor Blinov, the first ice hockey Olympic champion from Omsk.

Events and tenants
Preceded by Atlas Arena (Poland) Łódź	CEV Champions League; Final Venue; 2013	Succeeded by Başkent Volleyball Hall (Turkey) Ankara
