= JHC Spartak =

Junior ice hockey club from Moscow, Russia

- City: Moscow, Russia
- League: Junior Hockey League
- Conference: Western Conference
- Founded: 2009
- Home arena: Sokolniki Arena
- Colors
- Affiliate: HC Spartak Moscow (KHL)
- Website: Official website

Championships
- Regular season titles: Kharlamov Cup season 2013-14

МHK Spartak or JHC Spartak (Russian for Spartacus) is a junior ice hockey club from Moscow, Russia.

Founded in 2009, they compete in the Western Conference of the Junior Hockey League - the top tier of Russian junior hockey. The team's home arena is the Sokolniki Arena, and they are affiliated with the Kontinental Hockey League team HC Spartak Moscow.
