= Junior Hockey League (Russia) =

Hockey league in Russia

- Sport: Ice Hockey
- Founded: 2009
- Motto: Лига Сильных (Liga Silnykh, The League of the Strong)
- No. of teams: 37
- Country: Russia (29 teams); Belarus (1 team); Kazakhstan (1 team)
- Most recent champion: Loko Yaroslavl (3rd title)
- Most titles: Loko Yaroslavl (3)
- Broadcasters: KHL-TV (Russia (as part of the NTV Plus package), International (through KHL's website))
- Related competitions: KHL; VHL; VHL-B; NMHL
- Website: engmhl.khl.ru

The Junior Hockey League (JHL) (Russian: Молодёжная хоккейная лига (МХЛ), romanized: Molodezhnaya hokkeinaya liga (MHL)), sometimes translated as the Minor or Youth Hockey League, is a major junior ice hockey league in Eurasia, founded in 2009. It currently consists of 33 teams from 3 countries. Currently, all teams but one are subsidiaries (feeder teams) of their respective KHL or VHL professional counterparts. A player's age cannot be older than 20. The Kharlamov Cup, named after star ice hockey player Valeri Kharlamov, is awarded annually as the Ice Hockey Federation of Russia's official Junior Championship, following a 16-team playoff at the end of the regular season.

== Teams in 2024–25 ==
Junior Hockey League
Western Conference
Team	City	Arena	Affiliate Team	Founded	Joined league
Almaz	(Russia) Cherepovets	Ice Palace	Severstal Cherepovets (KHL)	2009	2009
Amurskie Tigry	(Russia) Khabarovsk	Platinum Arena	Amur Khabarovsk (KHL)	2010	2010
Atlanty	(Russia) Mytishchi	Mytishchi Arena	Spartak Moscow (KHL)	2009	2009
Dinamo-Shinnik Bobruysk	(Belarus) Bobruysk	Bobruysk-Arena	HC Dinamo Minsk (KHL)	2010	2011/2022
Chaika	(Russia) Nizhny Novgorod	Trade Union Sport Palace	Torpedo Nizhny Novgorod (KHL)	2009	2009
Dinamo Saint Petersburg	(Russia) Saint Petersburg	Yubileyny Sports Palace	Dinamo Saint Petersburg (VHL)	2013	2013
MHC Dynamo Moscow	(Russia) Moscow	Balashikha Arena	Dynamo Moscow (KHL)	2009	2009
JHC Krylya Sovetov	(Russia) Moscow	Soviet Wings Sport Palace	None	1947	2009/2016
Kapitan Stupino	(Russia) Stupino	Bobrov Ice Palace	HC Sochi (KHL)	1999	2011/2017
Krasnaya Armiya	(Russia) Moscow	CSKA Ice Palace	CSKA Moscow (KHL)	2009	2009
Loko Yaroslavl	(Russia) Yaroslavl	Arena 2000	Lokomotiv Yaroslavl (KHL)	2009	2009
Russkie Vityazi	(Russia) Chekhov	Ice Hockey Center 2004	Vityaz Podolsk (KHL)	2009	2009
SKA-1946	(Russia) Saint Petersburg	Yubileyny	SKA Saint Petersburg (KHL)	2009	2009
Spartak	(Russia) Moscow	Sokolniki Arena	Spartak Moscow (KHL)	2009	2009
Taifun	(Russia) Ussuriysk	Ice Arena	Admiral Vladivostok (KHL)	2016	2016
Eastern Conference
Team	City	Arena	Affiliate Team	Founded	Joined league
Avto	(Russia) Yekaterinburg	Yekaterinburg Sports Palace	Avtomobilist Yekaterinburg (KHL)	2009	2009
Belye Medvedi	(Russia) Chelyabinsk	Traktor Sport Palace	Traktor Chelyabinsk (KHL)	2009	2009
Irbis	(Russia) Kazan	TatNeft Arena	Ak Bars Kazan (KHL)	2011	2011
Kuznetskie Medvedi	(Russia) Novokuznetsk	Kuznetsk Metallurgists Sports Palace	Metallurg Novokuznetsk (VHL)	2009	2009
Ladya	(Russia) Tolyatti	Volgar Sports Palace	Lada Togliatti (VHL)	2009	2009/2013
Mamonty Yugry	(Russia) Khanty-Mansiysk	Arena Ugra	Yugra Khanty-Mansiysk (KHL)	2011	2011
Omskie Yastreby	(Russia) Omsk	Omsk Arena	Avangard Omsk (KHL)	2009	2009
Reaktor	(Russia) Nizhnekamsk	SCC Neftekhimik	Neftekhimik Nizhnekamsk (KHL)	2009	2009
Sarmaty	(Russia) Orenburg	Zvezdny Ice Palace	Yuzhny Ural (VHL)	2015	2015
Sibirskie Snaipery	(Russia) Novosibirsk	Sibir Arena	Sibir Novosibirsk (KHL)	2009	2009
Sputnik	(Russia) Almetyevsk	Yubileyny Sports Palace	Neftyanik Almetyevsk (VHL)	2011	2016
Stalnye Lisy	(Russia) Magnitogorsk	Magnitogorsk Arena	Metallurg Magnitogorsk (KHL)	2009	2009
Snezhnye Barsy	(Kazakhstan) Astana	Kazakhstan Sports Palace	Barys Astana (KHL)	2011	2011
Tolpar	(Russia) Ufa	Ice Palace/Ufa Arena	Salavat Yulaev Ufa (KHL)	2009	2009
Tyumensky Legion	(Russia) Tyumen	Sports Palace Tyumen	Rubin Tyumen (VHL)	2010	2010

== History ==
=== Seasons overview ===
Season	Kharlamov Cup Winner	Kharlamov Cup finalist	Final score	Eastern Conference winner	Western conference winner	Regular season winner
2009–10	(Russia) Stalnye Lisy	(Russia) Kuznetskie Medvedi	3–1	(Russia) Stalnye Lisy (54 games, 135 points)	(Russia) Krylya Sovetov (66 games, 119 points)	(Russia) Stalnye Lisy (41-4-4-5)
2010–11	(Russia) Krasnaya Armiya	(Russia) Stalnye Lisy	4–0	(Russia) Tolpar Ufa (53 games, 121 points)	(Russia) MHC Khimik (56 games, 107 points)	(Russia) Tolpar Ufa (37-1-8-7)
2011–12	(Russia) Omskie Yastreby	(Russia) Krasnaya Armiya	4–1	(Russia) Omskie Yastreby (60 games, 114 points)	(Russia) Almaz (60 games, 128 points)	(Russia) Almaz (40-2-2-14)
2012–13	(Russia) Omskie Yastreby	(Russia) MHC Spartak	4–3	(Russia) Omskie Yastreby (61 games, 151 points)	(Russia) Atlanty (64 games, 135 points)	(Russia) Omskie Yastreby (43-10-2-6)
2013–14	(Russia) MHC Spartak	(Russia) Krasnaya Armiya	4–3	(Russia) MHC Bars (56 games, 135 points)	(Russia) Loko Yaroslavl (56 games, 136 points)	(Russia) Loko Yaroslavl (39-8-3-6)
2014–15	(Russia) Chaika Nizhny Novgorod	(Russia) SKA-1946	4–1	(Russia) Belye Medvedi (54 games, 124 points)	(Russia) Loko Yaroslavl (56 games, 122 points)	(Russia) Belye Medvedi (36-7-2-9)
2015–16	(Russia) Loko Yaroslavl	(Russia) Chaika Nizhny Novgorod	4–1	(Russia) Omskie Yastreby (44 games, 93 points)	(Russia) Loko Yaroslavl (42 games, 92 points)	(Russia) Omskie Yastreby (26-6-3-9)
2016–17	(Russia) Krasnaya Armiya	(Russia) Reaktor	4–0	(Russia) Reaktor (60 games, 123 points)	(Russia) SKA-1946 (60 games, 121 points)	(Russia) Reaktor (36-4-7-13)
2017–18	(Russia) Loko Jaroslavl	(Russia) SKA-1946	4–2	(Russia) Loko (64 games, 162 points)	(Russia) SKA-1946 (64 games, 155 points)	(Russia) Loko (47-9-3-5)

=== 2009–10 season ===
In the first MHL season, 22 teams participated, all from Russia. The MHL opened its doors on September 4, 2009 in Moscow, when the first ever MHL game was played between MHC Dynamo (then the junior team of Dynamo Moscow) and CSKA-Red Army (the junior team of CSKA Moscow) with Dynamo picking up the 6–2 victory.

The 2010 Challenge Cup (Russian: Кубок Вызова, Kubok Vyzova), the all-star game of the MHL, was played on February 6 in the Ice Palace in Saint Petersburg. The Western Conference team defeated the Eastern Conference team 6–4. The last matches of the regular season were played on March 8, 2010. Steel Foxes (the junior team of Metallurg Magnitogorsk) won the Eastern Conference regular season and the overall MHL regular season with 135 points in 54 games. Soviet Wings won the Western Conference regular season with 119 points in 66 games.

The playoffs started on March 13, 2010. No teams of the Western Conference made it past the round of 16 of the playoffs. Steel Foxes and Kuznetskie Medvedi (the junior team of Metallurg Novokuznetsk) reached the playoff finals for the Kharlamov Cup. The first game of the best-of-five series between these two clubs was played on April 21, 2010. Steel Foxes won the first ever Kharlamov Cup after defeating Kuznetsk Bears 3–2 on April 26, 2010 and winning the series 3–1. Belye Medvedi (the junior team of Traktor Chelyabinsk) and Tolpar (the junior team of Salavat Yulaev Ufa) lost the semi-finals series of the playoffs and played in a two-legged tie for the third place. The first match of the tie was played on April 20, 2010 on Belye Medvedi's home ice and the second leg on April 24 on Tolpar's home ice. Tolpar won both games, first 4–2, second 5–2 and clinched third place of the first season of the MHL.

=== 2010–11 season ===
The number of teams was expanded from 22 in the inaugural season to 29 in the second season. 8 new teams joined the league while Dynamo Moscow's junior team left the league. Sheriff, the junior team of HC MVD in the inaugural season, was moved to Tver and would serve as the junior team of UHC Dynamo in the second season. Phoenix was renamed to MHC Khimik. MHC Krylya Sovetov was reunited with PHC Krylya Sovetov (playing in the VHL) and the MHL team of the newly reunited club was moved to Dmitrov. Among the new teams were teams from Belarus (Minskie Zubry (then the junior team of Dinamo Minsk) and MHC Yunost (the junior team of Yunost Minsk)) and Latvia (HC Riga (the junior team of Dinamo Riga)), thus making the league international. Both conferences were divided into 2 divisions each.

The regular season started on 4 September 2010 in Magnitogorsk with a match for the Opening Cup between last year's Kharlamov Cup playoff finalists Steel Foxes and Kuznetskie Medvedi. Steel Foxes won the match with 8 goals to 1. The 2011 Challenge Cup took place in Ufa on 12 February 2011. As in 2010, the match pitted the best players of the Western Conference on one side against the best players of the Eastern Conference on the other side. In the West, MHC Khimik won the regular season, while in the East, Tolpar Ufa was the winner.

The playoffs were for the first time separate in each conference, with the two winners meeting in the Kharlamov Cup final. In the final, the Red Army team from Moscow defeated the Steel Foxes from Magnitogorsk with a 4–0 sweep.

=== 2011–12 season ===
For the 2011–12 season, a second division named MHL-B was established, which features mostly junior teams of VHL teams. A relegation and promotion system is in place between the MHL and MHL-B. The number of MHL teams was expanded from 29 to 32. One team, Krylya Sovetov, left the league, while 4 new teams joined: Tatranskí Vlci from Spišská Nová Ves, Slovakia (the junior team of Lev Poprad), Kapitan Stupino from Stupino, Snezhnye Barsy from Astana, Kazakhstan (the junior team of Barys Astana) and Mamonty Yugry from Khanty-Mansiysk (the junior team of Yugra Khanty-Mansiysk). Minskie Zubry were renamed to Dinamo-Shinnik and moved to Babruysk. Sheriff was renamed to MHC MVD and moved from Tver to Balashikha.

The 2012 Challenge Cup took place in Magnitogorsk on 11 February 2012. The first ever Future Cup (Russian: Кубок Будущего, Kubok Budushchego) took place in Chelyabinsk on 13 March 2012 and featured the best under-18 players (not born before 1 January 1994) of both the MHL and the MHL-B division.

The regular season winners were the Omsk Hawks (the junior team of Avangard Omsk) in the East and Almaz Cherepovets (the junior team of Severstal Cherepovets) in the West. Omsk Hawks also made it to the Kharlamov Cup final, where they defeated the Red Army team from Moscow with a 4–1 series win.

=== 2012–13 season ===
For their fourth season, the MHL expanded to Czech Republic and Hungary, with the junior team of HC Energie Karlovy Vary and Patriot Budapest joining. The two Russian teams Kristall Berdsk and HC Oktan Perm were promoted from MHL-B, while Ladya Togliatti (the junior team of Lada Togliatti) and HC Olimpiya Kirovo-Chepetsk were relegated. Slovak team Tatranskí Vlci withdrew from the league. These changes brought the number of teams up to 33, representing 6 countries.

The Omsk Hawks once again made it to the Kharlamov Cup final, where this time they defeated MHC Spartak (the junior team of Spartak Moscow) from Moscow in 7 games, winning the seventh game in overtime thanks to Kirill Rasskazov. Omsk Hawks also became the first team ever to not only win 2 Kharlamov Cups, but also the first team to ever repeat as Kharlamov Cup champions.

=== 2013–14 season ===
For the fifth season, the league expanded to 40 teams, divided into two conferences with two divisions each. New teams are the junior team of EC Red Bull Salzburg from Austria, Molodaya Gvardia from Ukraine (the junior team of HC Donbass) and Dinamo Saint Petersburg. Ladya Togliatti, Olimpiya Kirovo-Chepetsk, Junior Kurgan (the junior team of Zauralie Kurgan) and HC Chelny were promoted from MHL-B. Oktan Perm was renamed to "Molot". In September, after the season had already started, Patriot from Hungary withdrew from the league, leaving only 39 teams to play the season.

MHC Spartak achieved redemption this season after falling just short the season before by winning the Kharlamov Cup defeating their rivals, the Red Army team from Moscow, 4–3 in the final.

=== 2014–15 season ===
For the sixth season, the league went through a number of changes, with 2 teams joining the league and 2 teams leaving, each for different reasons. Due to the War in Donbass, the league stated that Molodaya Gvardia would miss this season. JHC Bars (then the junior team of Ak Bars Kazan) left the league to join the Supreme Hockey League (VHL). Their place as Ak Bars Kazan's junior team would be taken by Irbis. New teams joining the league were an expansion team from Yuzhno-Sakhalinsk called the Sakhalin Sharks as well as Berkuty Kubani Krasnodar from Krasnodar, who were promoted from MHL-B.

Chaika (the junior team of Torpedo Nizhny Novgorod) won the Kharlamov Cup for the first time after defeating SKA-1946 (one of the junior teams of SKA Saint Petersburg) with a 4–1 final series win.

=== 2015–16 season ===
For the seventh season, the league once again went through some big changes, with both a small number of teams joining the league, but also with a huge number of teams leaving. Those teams leaving included MHC Khimik, who left the league to join the Supreme Hockey League (VHL), the junior team of EC Red Bull Salzburg, the junior team of HC Energie Karlovy Vary, Belye Tigry, Berkuty Kubani Krasnodar, Junior Kurgan, Dinamo-Shinnik and JHC Yunost (the junior team of Yunost Minsk). Meanwhile, new teams joining the league included the Russia U18 squad as well as Sarmaty from Orenburg (the junior team of Yuzhny Ural Orsk) and Dinamo-Raubichi (then the junior team of Dinamo Minsk) from Minsk, Belarus.

Chaika returned to the Kharlamov Cup final, but were not able to repeat as champions, with Loko Yaroslavl (the junior team of Lokomotiv Yaroslavl) winning the series, 4–1.

The first ever (and so far only) Super Cup (Russian: Суперкубок, Superkubok) took place on 30 April 2016 in Uchaly. It was the trophy awarded to the winner of the game between the winner of the Kharlamov Cup (the MHL champions) and the winner of the Regions Cup (the MHL-B champions) and was won by Loko Yaroslavl 5–1 against Gornyak Uchaly.

=== 2016–17 season ===
For the eighth season, the number of teams in the league was at 31 teams, representing 3 countries (28 from Russia, 2 from Kazakhstan and 1 from Latvia). Teams that left the league were Olimpiya Kirovo-Chepetsk, Dinamo-Raubichi, Russia U18 and the Sakhalin Sharks. Meanwhile, the teams that joined the league were Sputnik Almetyevsk (the junior team of Neftyanik Almetyevsk), expansion club Taifun from Ussuriysk (the junior team of Admiral Vladivostok), Altay Oskemen from Ust-Kamenogorsk, Kazakhstan (the junior team of Torpedo Ust-Kamenogorsk) as well as Krylya Sovetov who were returning to the league after being inactive for five years.

While Reaktor (the junior team of Neftekhimik Nizhnekamsk) dominated both the regular season and the first three rounds of the playoffs, they were not able to continue their success in the Kharlamov Cup final, with the Red Army team taking the series in a 4–0 sweep, winning their second Kharlamov Cup.

=== 2017–18 season ===
Season nine featured some minor changes with only 2 teams joining the league. Those teams were KRS Junior (the junior team of Kunlun Red Star) from Beijing, China (though they play their home games in Riga, Latvia) and returning Kapitan Stupino (which became the junior team of HC Sochi), thus bringing the number of teams in the league up to 33 once again, this time representing only 4 countries. Meanwhile, MHC MVD was renamed to MHK Dynamo.

== International matches ==
=== Tour of North America 2010–11 ===
In December 2010 and January 2011, a team composed of players playing in the MHL named the Red Stars toured North America and played 5 games there with the following results:

Date	Arena	City	Home team	Score	Visiting team
28 December 2010	Tate Rink	(United States) West Point, New York	Army Black Knights	4–11	MHL Red Stars
29 December 2010	Ingalls Rink	(United States) New Haven, Connecticut	Yale Bulldogs	5–3	MHL Red Stars
1 January 2011	Gale Centre	(Canada) Niagara Falls, Ontario	GOJHL Golden Horseshoe Conference all-stars	4–7	MHL Red Stars
3 January 2011	Allman Arena	(Canada) Stratford, Ontario	GOJHL Mid-Western Conference all-stars	3–11	MHL Red Stars
4 January 2011	Wellington and District Community Centre	(Canada) Wellington, Ontario	Wellington Dukes	2–5	MHL Red Stars

=== World Junior Club Cup 2011 ===
The city of Omsk hosted the inaugural Junior Club World Cup from August 30 to September 3, 2011. Krasnaya Armiya won the tournament beating HC Energie Karlovy Vary 7–2 in the final.

=== Tour of North America 2011–12 ===
As in 2010, the Red Stars (Russian: Красные Звезды, Krasnye Zvezdy), a team made of players who play in the MHL, toured North America. The opponents of the Red Stars were teams from NCAA Division I and the NAHL.

Date	Arena	City	Home team	Score	Visiting team
17 December 2011	Ralph Engelstad Arena	(United States) Grand Forks, North Dakota	North Dakota Fighting Sioux	5–1	MHL Red Stars
19 December 2011	Runestone Community Center	(United States) Alexandria, Minnesota	Alexandria Blizzard	1–5	MHL Red Stars
21 December 2011	V.F.W. Sports Center	(United States) Bismarck, North Dakota	Bismarck Bobcats	2–1	MHL Red Stars
27 December 2011	Gutterson Fieldhouse	(United States) Burlington, Vermont	Vermont Catamounts	1–6	MHL Red Stars
28 December 2011	Ingalls Rink	(United States) New Haven, Connecticut	Yale Bulldogs	6–4	MHL Red Stars
30 December 2011	Berry Events Center	(United States) Marquette, Michigan	Northern Michigan Wildcats	3–2	MHL Red Stars
3 January 2012	Compton Family Ice Arena	(United States) Notre Dame, Indiana	Notre Dame Fighting Irish	2–1	MHL Red Stars
5 January 2012	Tsongas Center	(United States) Lowell, Massachusetts	UMass Lowell River Hawks	6–4	MHL Red Stars

=== IIHF U20 Challenge Cup of Asia 2012 ===
MHL Red Stars participated in the 2012 IIHF U20 Challenge Cup of Asia, the U20 edition of the IIHF Challenge Cup of Asia. Red Stars won all 4 of their games, with a total of 57–0 goals.

=== Tour of North America 2012–13 ===
Date	Arena	City	Home team	Score	Visiting team
23 December 2012	Bright Hockey Center	(United States) Allston, MA	Atlantic Junior Hockey League	2–11	MHL Red Stars
27 December 2012	Tate Rink	(United States) West Point, NY	Army Black Knights	2–6	MHL Red Stars
28 December 2012	Ingalls Rink	(United States) New Haven, CT	Yale Bulldogs	10–2	MHL Red Stars
30 December 2012	Harbour Station	(Canada) Saint John, NB	UNB Varsity Reds	7-3	MHL Red Stars
31 December 2012	Aitken Centre	(Canada) Fredericton, NB	UNB Varsity Reds	5–2	MHL Red Stars
2 January 2013	Meehan Auditorium	(United States) Providence, RI	Brown Bears	7–1	MHL Red Stars

=== IIHF U20 Challenge Cup of Asia 2013 ===
The MHL Red Stars participated in the 2013 IIHF U20 Challenge Cup of Asia. The tournament was held in Khabarovsk. The Red Stars won the game against South Korea but lost against Japan, finishing second in the tournament.

=== Tour of North America 2013–14 ===
Game against the Merrimack Warriors cancelled due to severe weather concerns according to North American sources. Game ended 5 goals to 4 after a shootout according to Russian sources.

Date	Arena	City	Home team	Score	Visiting team
23 December 2013	Tsongas Arena	(United States) Lowell, MA	Eastern Hockey League	4–5	MHL Red Stars
27 December 2013	Ingalls Rink	(United States) New Haven, CT	Yale Bulldogs	6–3	MHL Red Stars
29 December 2013	Bright Hockey Center	(United States) Allston, MA	Harvard Crimson	9–3	MHL Red Stars
31 December 2013	Starr Rink	(United States) Hamilton, NY	Colgate Raiders	3–2	MHL Red Stars
2 January 2014	Lawler Rink	(United States) North Andover, MA	Merrimack Warriors	5–4 SO	MHL Red Stars
3 January 2014	Lynah Rink	(United States) Ithaca, NY	Cornell Big Red	6–0	MHL Red Stars
