= 2016–17 Chicago Blackhawks season =

National Hockey League team season

2016–17 Chicago Blackhawks
- Central Division champions
- Division: 1st Central
- Conference: 1st Western
- 2016–17 record: 50–23–9
- Home record: 26–10–5
- Road record: 24–13–4
- Goals for: 244
- Goals against: 213

Team information
- General manager: Stan Bowman
- Coach: Joel Quenneville
- Captain: Jonathan Toews
- Alternate captains: Duncan Keith; Brent Seabrook
- Arena: United Center
- Average attendance: 21,751 (110.3%); Total: 891,827
- Minor league affiliates: Rockford IceHogs (AHL); Indy Fuel (ECHL)

Team leaders
- Goals: Patrick Kane (34)
- Assists: Patrick Kane (55)
- Points: Patrick Kane (89)
- Penalty minutes: Ryan Hartman (70)
- Plus/minus: Duncan Keith (+22)
- Wins: Corey Crawford (32)
- Goals against average: Scott Darling (2.38)

The 2016–17 Chicago Blackhawks season was the 91st season for the National Hockey League, a franchise that was established on September 25, 1926. The Blackhawks finished the season with 109 points to win the Central Division and the best record in the Western Conference. As a result, they received the No. 1 seed in the West of the Stanley Cup Playoffs, but were swept in the first round by the eighth-seeded and eventual Stanley Cup runner-up Nashville Predators.

Following the playoff loss, general manager Stan Bowman stated that the playoff loss was unacceptable and vowed that changes would be made.

Patrick Kane led the Blackhawks in scoring with 89 points and 34 goals. The Blackhawks had six players score 20 or more goals, Kane, Artemi Panarin (31), Marian Hossa (26), Artem Anisimov (22), Richard Panik (22), and Jonathan Toews (21). Goaltender Corey Crawford led the Blackhawks with 32 wins.

== Standings ==
Central Division
Pos	Team	GP	W	L	OTL	ROW	GF	GA	GD	Pts
1	z – Chicago Blackhawks	82	50	23	9	46	244	213	+31	109
2	x – Minnesota Wild	82	49	25	8	46	266	208	+58	106
3	x – St. Louis Blues	82	46	29	7	44	235	218	+17	99
4	x – Nashville Predators	82	41	29	12	39	240	224	+16	94
5	Winnipeg Jets	82	40	35	7	37	249	256	−7	87
6	Dallas Stars	82	34	37	11	33	223	262	−39	79
7	Colorado Avalanche	82	22	56	4	21	166	278	−112	48

Source: National Hockey League
x – Clinched playoff spot; z – Clinched conference

== Schedule and results ==
=== Pre-season ===
2016 Pre-season Game Log: 2–4–0 (Home: 2–1–0; Road: 0–3–0)
#	Date	Opponent	Score	OT	Decision	Arena	Attendance	Record	Recap
1	September 28	Pittsburgh	0–2		Darling	United Center	20,195	0–1–0	L1
2	September 30	@ Pittsburgh	0–1		Johansson	Consol Energy Center	18,084	0–2–0	L2
3	October 1	St. Louis	4–0		Darling	United Center	20,831	1–2–0	W1
4	October 2	@ Detroit	3–6		Nalimov	Joe Louis Arena	17,962	1–3–0	L1
5	October 4	Detroit	6–1		Crawford	United Center	20,407	2–3–0	W1
6	October 8	@ St. Louis	1–2		Crawford	Scottrade Center	17,346	2–4–0	L1

=== Regular season ===
2016–17 Game Log

October: 5–3–1 (Home: 4–1–1; Road: 1–2–0)
#	Date	Opponent	Score	OT	Decision	Arena	Attendance	Record	Pts	Recap
1	October 12	St. Louis	2–5		Crawford	United Center	21,729	0–1–0	0	L1
2	October 14	@ Nashville	2–3		Crawford	Bridgestone Arena	17,256	0–2–0	0	L2
3	October 15	Nashville	5–3		Darling	United Center	21,665	1–2–0	2	W1
4	October 18	Philadelphia	7–4		Crawford	United Center	21,263	2–2–0	4	W2
5	October 21	@ Columbus	2–3		Crawford	Nationwide Arena	15,789	2–3–0	4	L1
6	October 22	Toronto	5–4	SO	Darling	United Center	21,735	3–3–0	6	W1
7	October 24	Calgary	2–3	SO	Crawford	United Center	21,348	3–3–1	7	O1
8	October 28	@ New Jersey	3–2	OT	Crawford	Prudential Center	13,882	4–3–1	9	W1
9	October 30	Los Angeles	3–0		Crawford	United Center	21,329	5–3–1	11	W2

November: 10–3–2 (Home: 5–0–1; Road: 5–3–1)
#	Date	Opponent	Score	OT	Decision	Arena	Attendance	Record	Pts	Recap
10	November 1	Calgary	5–1		Crawford	United Center	21,166	6–3–1	13	W3
11	November 3	Colorado	4–0		Crawford	United Center	21,580	7–3–1	15	W4
12	November 5	@ Dallas	3–2		Crawford	American Airlines Center	18,532	8–3–1	17	W5
13	November 6	Dallas	4–3	OT	Darling	United Center	21,901	9–3–1	19	W6
14	November 9	@ St. Louis	2–1	OT	Crawford	Scottrade Center	18,704	10–3–1	21	W7
15	November 11	Washington	2–3	OT	Crawford	United Center	22,075	10–3–2	22	O1
16	November 13	Montreal	3–2		Crawford	United Center	21,762	11–3–2	24	W1
17	November 15	@ Winnipeg	0–4		Crawford	MTS Centre	15,294	11–4–2	24	L1
18	November 18	@ Calgary	3–2		Crawford	Scotiabank Saddledome	18,691	12–4–2	26	W1
19	November 19	@ Vancouver	4–3	OT	Darling	Rogers Arena	18,865	13–4–2	28	W2
20	November 21	@ Edmonton	0–5		Crawford	Rogers Place	18,347	13–5–2	28	L1
21	November 23	@ San Jose	1–2		Crawford	SAP Center at San Jose	17,501	13–6–2	28	L2
22	November 25	@ Anaheim	3–2		Crawford	Honda Center	17,174	14–6–2	30	W1
23	November 26	@ Los Angeles	1–2	OT	Darling	Staples Center	18,435	14–6–3	31	O1
24	November 29	Florida	2–1	SO	Crawford	United Center	21,475	15–6–3	33	W1

December: 8–5–2 (Home: 4–3–2; Road: 4–2–0)
#	Date	Opponent	Score	OT	Decision	Arena	Attendance	Record	Pts	Recap
25	December 1	New Jersey	4–3	OT	Crawford	United Center	21,351	16–6–3	35	W2
26	December 3	@ Philadelphia	1–3		Darling	Wells Fargo Center	19,487	16–7–3	35	L1
27	December 4	Winnipeg	1–2		Darling	United Center	21,383	16–8–3	35	L2
28	December 6	Arizona	4–0		Darling	United Center	21,327	17–8–3	37	W1
29	December 9	NY Rangers	0–1	OT	Darling	United Center	21,770	17–8–4	38	O1
30	December 11	Dallas	3–1		Darling	United Center	21,451	18–8–4	40	W1
31	December 13	@ NY Rangers	2–1		Darling	Madison Square Garden	18,006	19–8–4	42	W2
32	December 15	@ NY Islanders	5–4		Darling	Barclays Center	12,504	20–8–4	44	W3
33	December 17	@ St. Louis	6–4		Darling	Scottrade Center	19,197	21–8–4	46	W4
34	December 18	San Jose	4–1		Darling	United Center	22,027	22–8–4	48	W5
35	December 20	Ottawa	3–4		Darling	United Center	21,614	22–9–4	48	L1
36	December 23	Colorado	1–2	OT	Crawford	United Center	21,918	22–9–5	49	O1
37	December 27	Winnipeg	1–3		Crawford	United Center	22,117	22–10–5	49	L1
38	December 29	@ Nashville	3–2		Crawford	Bridgestone Arena	17,229	23–10–5	51	W1
39	December 30	@ Carolina	2–3		Darling	PNC Arena	18,016	23–11–5	51	L1

January: 7–6–0 (Home: 5–3–0; Road: 2–3–0)
#	Date	Opponent	Score	OT	Decision	Arena	Attendance	Record	Pts	Recap
40	January 2	@ St. Louis	1–4		Crawford	Busch Stadium	46,556 (outdoors)	23–12–5	51	L2
41	January 5	Buffalo	4–3	OT	Crawford	United Center	21,824	24–12–5	53	W1
42	January 6	Carolina	2–1		Darling	United Center	21,822	25–12–5	55	W2
43	January 8	Nashville	5–2		Crawford	United Center	21,658	26–12–5	57	W3
44	January 10	Detroit	4–3	OT	Crawford	United Center	22,019	27–12–5	59	W4
45	January 13	@ Washington	0–6		Crawford	Verizon Center	18,506	27–13–5	59	L1
46	January 15	Minnesota	2–3		Crawford	United Center	22,051	27–14–5	59	L2
47	January 17	@ Colorado	6–4		Crawford	Pepsi Center	18,007	28–14–5	61	W1
48	January 20	@ Boston	1–0		Darling	TD Garden	17,565	29–14–5	63	W2
49	January 22	Vancouver	4–2		Crawford	United Center	21,689	30–14–5	65	W3
50	January 24	Tampa Bay	2–5		Crawford	United Center	21,617	30–15–5	65	L1
51	January 26	Winnipeg	3–5		Darling	United Center	21,746	30–16–5	65	L2
January 27–29		All-Star Break in Los Angeles				Staples Center
52	January 31	@ San Jose	1–3		Crawford	SAP Center at San Jose	17,424	30–17–5	65	L3

February: 9–1–0 (Home: 2–1–0; Road: 7–0–0)
#	Date	Opponent	Score	OT	Decision	Arena	Attendance	Record	Pts	Recap
53	February 2	@ Arizona	4–3		Crawford	Gila River Arena	17,125	31–17–5	67	W1
54	February 4	@ Dallas	5–3		Crawford	American Airlines Center	18,532	32–17–5	69	W2
55	February 8	@ Minnesota	4–3	OT	Crawford	Xcel Energy Center	19,326	33–17–5	71	W3
56	February 10	@ Winnipeg	5–2		Crawford	MTS Centre	15,294	34–17–5	73	W4
57	February 11	@ Edmonton	5–1		Darling	Rogers Place	18,347	35–17–5	75	W5
58	February 18	Edmonton	1–3		Crawford	United Center	22,075	35–18–5	75	L1
59	February 19	@ Buffalo	5–1		Darling	KeyBank Center	19,070	36–18–5	77	W1
60	February 21	@ Minnesota	5–3		Crawford	Xcel Energy Center	19,333	37–18–5	79	W2
61	February 23	Arizona	6–3		Crawford	United Center	21,781	38–18–5	81	W3
62	February 26	St. Louis	4–2		Darling	United Center	21,961	39–18–5	83	W4

March: 11–3–2 (Home: 6–1–1; Road: 5–2–1)
#	Date	Opponent	Score	OT	Decision	Arena	Attendance	Record	Pts	Recap
63	March 1	Pittsburgh	4–1		Darling	United Center	22,012	40–18–5	85	W5
64	March 3	NY Islanders	2–1	SO	Crawford	United Center	21,883	41–18–5	87	W6
65	March 4	@ Nashville	5–3		Crawford	Bridgestone Arena	17,297	42–18–5	89	W7
66	March 9	Anaheim	0–1		Crawford	United Center	21,838	42–19–5	89	L1
67	March 10	@ Detroit	2–4		Crawford	Joe Louis Arena	20,027	42–20–5	89	L2
68	March 12	Minnesota	4–2		Crawford	United Center	22,147	43–20–5	91	W1
69	March 14	@ Montreal	4–2		Crawford	Bell Centre	21,288	44–20–5	93	W2
70	March 16	@ Ottawa	2–1		Darling	Canadian Tire Centre	18,638	45–20–5	95	W3
71	March 18	@ Toronto	2–1	OT	Crawford	Air Canada Centre	19,505	46–20–5	97	W4
72	March 19	Colorado	6–3		Darling	United Center	22,070	47–20–5	99	W5
73	March 21	Vancouver	4–5	OT	Darling	United Center	21,607	47–20–6	100	O1
74	March 23	Dallas	3–2	SO	Crawford	United Center	21,798	48–20–6	102	W1
75	March 25	@ Florida	0–7		Crawford	BB&T Center	18,625	48–21–6	102	L1
76	March 27	@ Tampa Bay	4–5	OT	Darling	Amalie Arena	19,092	48–21–7	103	O1
77	March 29	@ Pittsburgh	5–1		Crawford	PPG Paints Arena	18,657	49–21–7	105	W1
78	March 31	Columbus	3–1		Crawford	United Center	22,112	50–21–7	107	W2

April: 0–2–2 (Home: 0–1–0; Road: 0–1–2)
#	Date	Opponent	Score	OT	Decision	Arena	Attendance	Record	Pts	Recap
79	April 2	Boston	2–3		Crawford	United Center	22,131	50–22–7	107	L1
80	April 4	@ Colorado	3–4	OT	Darling	Pepsi Center	16,023	50–22–8	108	O1
81	April 6	@ Anaheim	0–4		Crawford	Honda Center	16,462	50–23–8	108	L1
82	April 8	@ Los Angeles	2–3	OT	Crawford	Staples Center	18,230	50–23–9	109	O1

Legend: Win (2 points) Loss (0 points) Overtime/shootout loss (1 point)

=== Detailed records ===
Western Conference
Opponent	Home	Away	Total	Pts.	Goals scored	Goals allowed
Central Division
Chicago Blackhawks	—	—	—	—	—	—
Colorado Avalanche	2–0–1	1–0–1	3–0–2	8	20	13
Dallas Stars	3–0–0	2–0–0	5–0–0	10	18	11
Minnesota Wild	1–1–0	2–0–0	3–1–0	6	15	11
Nashville Predators	2–0–0	2–1–0	4–1–0	8	20	13
St. Louis Blues	1–1–0	2–1–0	3–2–0	6	15	16
Winnipeg Jets	0–3–0	1–1–0	1–4–0	2	10	16
	9–5–1	10–3–2	19–8–2	40	98	80
Pacific Division
Anaheim Ducks	0–1–0	1–1–0	1–2–0	2	3	7
Arizona Coyotes	2–0–0	1–0–0	3–0–0	6	14	6
Calgary Flames	1–0–1	1–0–0	2–0–1	5	10	6
Edmonton Oilers	0–1–0	1–1–0	1–2–0	2	6	9
Los Angeles Kings	1–0–0	0–0–2	1–0–2	4	6	5
San Jose Sharks	1–0–0	0–2–0	1–2–0	2	6	6
Vancouver Canucks	1–0–1	1–0–0	2–0–1	5	12	10
	6–2–2	5–4–2	11–6–4	26	57	49

Eastern Conference
Opponent	Home	Away	Total	Pts.	Goals scored	Goals allowed
Atlantic Division
Boston Bruins	0–1–0	1–0–0	1–1–0	2	3	3
Buffalo Sabres	1–0–0	1–0–0	2–0–0	4	9	4
Detroit Red Wings	1–0–0	0–1–0	1–1–0	2	6	7
Florida Panthers	1–0–0	0–1–0	1–1–0	2	2	8
Montreal Canadiens	1–0–0	1–0–0	2–0–0	4	7	4
Ottawa Senators	0–1–0	1–0–0	1–1–0	2	5	5
Tampa Bay Lightning	0–1–0	0–0–1	0–1–1	1	6	10
Toronto Maple Leafs	1–0–0	1–0–0	2–0–0	4	7	5
	5–3–0	5–2–1	10–5–1	21	45	46
Metropolitan Division
Carolina Hurricanes	1–0–0	0–1–0	1–1–0	2	4	4
Columbus Blue Jackets	1–0–0	0–1–0	1–1–0	2	5	4
New Jersey Devils	1–0–0	1–0–0	2–0–0	4	7	5
New York Islanders	1–0–0	1–0–0	2–0–0	4	7	5
New York Rangers	0–0–1	1–0–0	1–0–1	3	2	2
Philadelphia Flyers	1–0–0	0–1–0	1–1–0	2	8	7
Pittsburgh Penguins	1–0–0	1–0–0	2–0–0	4	9	2
Washington Capitals	0–0–1	0–1–0	0–1–1	1	2	9
	6–0–2	4–4–0	10–4–2	22	44	38

=== Playoffs ===
2017 Stanley Cup playoffs

Western Conference First Round vs. (WC2) Nashville Predators: Nashville won 4–0
Game	Date	Opponent	Score	OT	Decision	Arena	Attendance	Series	Recap
1	April 13	Nashville	0–1		Crawford	United Center	22,075	0–1	Recap
2	April 15	Nashville	0–5		Crawford	United Center	22,175	0–2	Recap
3	April 17	@ Nashville	2–3	OT	Crawford	Bridgestone Arena	17,204	0–3	Recap
4	April 20	@ Nashville	1–4		Crawford	Bridgestone Arena	17,326	0–4	Recap

Legend: Win Loss

== Player statistics ==
Final stats

=== Skaters ===
Regular season
Player	GP	G	A	Pts	+/−	PIM
Patrick Kane	82	34	55	89	11	32
Artemi Panarin	82	31	43	74	18	21
Jonathan Toews	72	21	37	58	7	35
Duncan Keith	80	6	47	53	22	16
Marian Hossa	73	26	19	45	7	8
Artem Anisimov	64	22	23	45	9	30
Richard Panik	82	22	22	44	14	58
Brent Seabrook	79	3	36	39	5	26
Ryan Hartman	76	19	12	31	13	70
Nick Schmaltz	61	6	22	28	10	6
Niklas Hjalmarsson	73	5	13	18	12	20
Brian Campbell	80	5	12	17	12	24
Marcus Kruger	70	5	12	17	7	34
Tanner Kero	47	6	10	16	15	8
Trevor van Riemsdyk	58	5	11	16	17	29
Vinnie Hinostroza	49	6	8	14	−1	17
Dennis Rasmussen	68	4	4	8	−4	12
Michal Kempny	50	2	6	8	1	22
Tyler Motte	33	4	3	7	2	14
Gustav Forsling	38	2	3	5	3	4
John Hayden	12	1	3	4	3	4
Jordin Tootoo	50	2	1	3	−6	28
Michal Rozsival	22	1	2	3	−3	14
Johnny Oduya^{†}	15	1	1	2	−2	8
Andrew Desjardins	46	0	1	1	−6	22
Tomas Jurco^{†}	13	1	0	1	−4	2
Spencer Abbott^{‡}	1	0	0	0	0	0
Totals	82	240	406	646	162	564

Playoffs
Player	GP	G	A	Pts	+/−	PIM
Jonathan Toews	4	1	1	2	−5	0
Patrick Kane	4	1	1	2	−3	2
Dennis Rasmussen	3	1	0	1	−2	0
Duncan Keith	4	0	1	1	−6	2
Richard Panik	4	0	1	1	−3	2
Marcus Kruger	4	0	1	1	−2	2
Artemi Panarin	4	0	1	1	−4	0
Marian Hossa	4	0	0	0	−4	2
Brian Campbell	4	0	0	0	−2	0
Johnny Oduya	4	0	0	0	−3	0
Brent Seabrook	4	0	0	0	−3	2
Niklas Hjalmarsson	4	0	0	0	−4	2
Artem Anisimov	4	0	0	0	−2	0
Ryan Hartman	4	0	0	0	−3	14
Trevor van Riemsdyk	4	0	0	0	−4	0
Nick Schmaltz	4	0	0	0	−2	2
Tanner Kero	4	0	0	0	−2	0
Jordin Tootoo	2	0	0	0	0	0
Vinnie Hinostroza	1	0	0	0	−2	0
John Hayden	1	0	0	0	0	0
Michal Kempny	1	0	0	0	0	0

=== Goaltenders ===
Regular season
Player	GP	GS	TOI	W	L	OT	GA	GAA	SA	SV%	SO	G	A	PIM
Corey Crawford	55	55	3246:52	32	18	4	138	2.55	1691	.918	2	0	1	2
Scott Darling	32	27	1688:35	18	5	5	67	2.38	877	.924	2	0	0	0
Totals		82	4935:27	50	23	9	205	2.49	2568	.920	4	0	1	2

Playoffs
Player	GP	GS	TOI	W	L	GA	GAA	SA	SV%	SO	G	A	PIM
Corey Crawford	4	4	253:47	0	4	12	2.83	123	.902	0	0	0	0

^{†}Denotes player spent time with another team before joining Blackhawks. Stats reflect time with Blackhawks only.
^{‡}Left team mid-season. Stats reflect time with Blackhawks only.

== Awards and honours ==
=== Awards ===
Regular season
Player	Award	Awarded
A. Anisimov	NHL Second Star of the Week	October 24, 2016
C. Crawford	NHL Second Star of the Week	November 7, 2016
A. Panarin	NHL First Star of the Week	December 19, 2016
C. Crawford	NHL All-Star game selection	January 10, 2017
P. Kane	NHL All-Star game selection	January 10, 2017
D. Keith	NHL All-Star game selection	January 10, 2017
J. Toews	NHL All-Star game selection	January 10, 2017
J. Toews	NHL Second Star of the Week	February 27, 2017
J. Toews	NHL First Star of the Month	March 1, 2017
P. Kane	NHL Third Star of the Month	April 1, 2017
A. Panarin	NHL First Star of the Week	April 3, 2017

=== Milestones ===
Regular season
Player	Milestone	Reached
Gustav Forsling	1st career NHL game	October 12, 2016
Ryan Hartman	1st career NHL goal	October 12, 2016
Michal Kempny	1st career NHL game	October 12, 2016
Tyler Motte	1st career NHL game 1st career NHL assist 1st career NHL point	October 12, 2016
Nick Schmaltz	1st career NHL game	October 12, 2016
Richard Panik	1st career NHL hat trick	October 15, 2016
Nick Schmaltz	1st career NHL goal 1st career NHL point	October 15, 2016
Marian Hossa	500th career NHL goal	October 18, 2016
Gustav Forsling	1st career NHL assist 1st career NHL point	October 21, 2016
Tyler Motte	1st career NHL goal	October 21, 2016
Artemi Panarin	1st career NHL fight 1st career Gordie Howe hat trick	November 9, 2016
Gustav Forsling	1st career NHL goal	November 13, 2016
Michal Kempny	1st career NHL assist 1st career NHL point	November 18, 2016
Vinnie Hinostroza	1st career NHL goal 1st career NHL assist 1st career NHL point	November 19, 2016
Richard Panik	200th career NHL game	November 19, 2016
Artemi Panarin	100th career NHL game	November 21, 2016
Artemi Panarin	100th career NHL point	December 4, 2016
Patrick Kane	700th career NHL point	December 29, 2016
Michal Kempny	1st career NHL goal	December 30, 2016
Duncan Keith	400th career NHL assist	January 5, 2017
Patrick Kane	700th career NHL game	January 6, 2017
Ryan Hartman	1st career NHL hat trick	January 8, 2017
Marian Hossa	600th career NHL assist	January 17, 2017
Brian Campbell	500th career NHL point	January 22, 2017
Corey Crawford	200th career NHL win	January 22, 2017
Niklas Hjalmarsson	600th career NHL game	January 26, 2017
Brent Seabrook	900th career NHL game	February 18, 2017
Jonathan Toews	600th career NHL point	February 18, 2017
Marcus Kruger	100th career NHL point	February 19, 2017
Dennis Rasmussen	100th career NHL game	February 21, 2017
Duncan Keith	500th career NHL point	February 26, 2017
Jonathan Toews	700th career NHL game	March 3, 2017
Brent Seabrook	400th career NHL point	March 4, 2017
Duncan Keith	900th career NHL game	March 10, 2017
Andrew Desjardins	400th career NHL game	March 10, 2017
John Hayden	1st career NHL game	March 16, 2017
Marian Hossa	1,300th career NHL game	March 16, 2017
John Hayden	1st career NHL goal 1st career NHL point	March 18, 2017
John Hayden	1st career NHL assist	March 19, 2017
John Hayden	1st career NHL playoff game	April 13, 2017
Ryan Hartman	1st career NHL playoff game	April 13, 2017
Tanner Kero	1st career NHL playoff game	April 13, 2017
Nick Schmaltz	1st career NHL playoff game	April 13, 2017
Dennis Rasmussen	1st career NHL playoff game	April 15, 2017
Vinnie Hinostroza	1st career NHL playoff game	April 15, 2017
Dennis Rasmussen	1st career NHL playoff goal	April 17, 2017
Michal Kempny	1st career NHL playoff game	April 20, 2017

== Transactions ==
The Blackhawks have been involved in the following transactions during the 2016–17 season.

=== Trades ===
Date	Details		Ref
June 15, 2016	To Carolina Hurricanes Teuvo Teravainen; Bryan Bickell	To Chicago Blackhawks NYR's 2nd round pick in 2016; CHI's 3rd round pick in 2017
June 24, 2016	To Montreal Canadiens Andrew Shaw	To Chicago Blackhawks 2nd-round pick in 2016; MIN's 2nd-round pick in 2016
June 25, 2016	To New York Islanders CBJ's 4th-round pick in 2016	To Chicago Blackhawks 4th-round pick in 2016; 6th-round pick in 2017
June 25, 2016	To St. Louis Blues FLA's 5th-round pick in 2016	To Chicago Blackhawks 5th-round pick in 2017
January 21, 2017	To Los Angeles Kings Cameron Schilling	To Chicago Blackhawks Michael Latta
February 24, 2017	To Detroit Red Wings 3rd-round pick in 2017	To Chicago Blackhawks Tomas Jurco
February 28, 2017	To Dallas Stars Mark McNeill conditional 4th-round pick in 2018	To Chicago Blackhawks Johnny Oduya
March 1, 2017	To Anaheim Ducks Spencer Abbott; Sam Carrick	To Chicago Blackhawks Kenton Helgesen; 7th-round pick in 2019

=== Free agents acquired ===
Date	Player	Former team	Contract terms (in U.S. dollars)	Ref
July 1, 2016	Brian Campbell	Florida Panthers	1 year, $1.5 million	
July 1, 2016	Sam Carrick	Toronto Maple Leafs	1 year, $600,000	
July 1, 2016	Spencer Abbott	Frolunda HC	1 year, $575,000	
July 5, 2016	Jordin Tootoo	New Jersey Devils	1 year, $750,000	
September 25, 2016	Alexandre Fortin	Rouyn-Noranda Huskies	3 years, $2.055 million entry-level contract	
February 23, 2017	Jeff Glass	Rockford IceHogs	2 years, $1.225 million	
March 2, 2017	Matthew Highmore	Saint John Sea Dogs	3 years, $2.775 million entry-level contract	
May 1, 2017	David Kampf	Pirati Chomutov	2 years, $1.85 million entry-level contract	
June 7, 2017	Jan Rutta	Pirati Chomutov	1 year, $1.35 million entry-level contract	

=== Free agents lost ===
Date	Player	New team	Contract terms (in U.S. dollars)	Ref
July 1, 2016	Dale Weise	Philadelphia Flyers	4 year, $9.4 million	
July 1, 2016	Andrew Ladd	New York Islanders	7 years, $38.5 million	

=== Claimed via waivers ===
Player	Old team	Date claimed off waivers	Ref

=== Lost via waivers ===
Player	New team	Date	Ref

=== Lost via retirement ===
Player	Ref
Dillon Fournier	

=== Player signings ===
Date	Player	Contract terms (in U.S. dollars)	Ref
June 30, 2016	Brandon Mashinter	1 year, $575,000	
June 30, 2016	Michal Rozsival	1 year, $600,000	
July 1, 2016	Pierre-Cedric Labrie	1 year, $575,000	
July 15, 2016	Mark McNeill	1 year, $600,000	
December 29, 2016	Artemi Panarin	2 years, $12 million	
February 28, 2017	Michal Rozsival	1 year, $650,000 contract extension	
February 28, 2017	Jordin Tootoo	1 year, $700,000 contract extension	
March 12, 2017	John Hayden	2 years, $1.85 million entry-level contract	
March 13, 2017	Anthony Louis	2 years, $1.85 million entry-level contract	
March 15, 2017	Luc Snuggerud	3 years, $2.775 million entry-level contract	
March 23, 2017	Tanner Kero	2 years, $1.5 million contract extension	
March 28, 2017	Matheson Iacopelli	2 years, $1.85 million entry-level contract	
April 27, 2017	Nathan Noel	3 years, $2.775 million entry-level contract	
May 11, 2017	Richard Panik	2 years, $5.6 million	
May 27, 2017	Michal Kempny	1 year, $900,000	

=== Detailed transaction list ===
==== Off-season ====
- April 29, 2016 – Agreed to terms with F Luke Johnson on a three-year contract.
- May 11, 2016 – Agreed to terms with D Gustav Forsling on a three-year contract.
- May 24, 2016 – Agreed to terms with G Lars Johansson, D Michal Kempny and F Martin Lundberg on one-year contracts.
- June 15, 2016 – Agreed to terms with G Mac Carruth on a one-year contract.
- June 15, 2016 – Agreed to terms with F Richard Panik on a one-year contract.
- June 19, 2016 – Agreed to terms with F Nick Schmaltz on a three-year contract.
- June 23, 2016 – Agreed to terms with F Dennis Rasmussen on a one-year contract.
- June 30, 2016 – Agreed to terms with F Brandon Mashinter and D Michal Rozsival on one-year contracts
- July 1, 2016 – Agreed to terms with D Brian Campbell and Fs Sam Carrick, Spencer Abbott and Pierre-Cedric Labrie on one-year contracts. Named Will Chukerman media relations assistant.
- July 6, 2016 – Agreed to terms with F Jordin Tootoo on a one-year contract.
- July 7, 2016 – Named Derek King assistant coach for Rockford (AHL).
- July 15, 2016 – Agreed to terms with F Mark McNeill on a one-year contract.
- September 26, 2016 – Agreed to terms with F Alexandre Fortin on a three-year contract.
- September 26, 2016 – Released Fs Tyler Barnes, Bryn Chyzyk, Jeremy Langlois, Trevor Mingoia, Evan Mosey; D Jonathan Carlsson, Nick Mattson and G Eric Levine from their tryout agreements. Released F Radovan Bondra, John Dahlstrom, Nathan Noel and Roy Radke from training camp and returned them to their junior hockey teams.
- September 30, 2016 – Agreed to terms with F Graham Knott on a three-year contract.

==== October ====
- October 1, 2016 – Assigned F Kyle Baun, D Dillon Fournier, D Carl Dahlstrom and D Nolan Valleau to Rockford (AHL). Released F Alex DeBrincat and F Graham Knott from training camp.
- October 2, 2016 – Assigned G Mac Carruth to Rockford (AHL).
- October 3, 2016 – Assigned Fs Luke Johnson, Tanner Kero and Martin Lundberg; D Erik Gustafsson, Robin Norell and Ville Pokka, and G Lars Johansson to Rockford (AHL). Released Fs Chris DeSousa and Jake Dowell from their tryout agreements.
- October 4, 2016 – Assigned Fs Spencer Abbott, Sam Carrick and Pierre-Cedric Labrie and D Viktor Svedberg and Cameron Schilling to Rockford (AHL).
- October 7, 2016 – Recalled D Viktor Svedberg and D Ville Pokka from Rockford (AHL).
- October 9, 2016 – Assigned D Dillon Fournier, Ville Pokka and Viktor Svedberg to Rockford (AHL).
- October 10, 2016 – Assigned F Alexandre Fortin to Rouyn-Noranda (QMJHL) and G Ivan Nalimov to Vladivostok (KHL). Placed F Andrew Desjardins on injured reserve.
- October 11, 2016 – Assigned Fs Brandon Mashinter and Mark McNeill to Rockford (AHL).

==== November ====
- November 6, 2016 – Placed F Trevor van Riemsdyk on injured reserve. Activated F Andrew Desjardins from injured reserve.
- November 7, 2016 – Agreed to terms with F DeBrincat on a three-year contract.

==== December ====
- December 2, 2016 – Placed F Jonathan Toews on injured reserve, retroactive to Nov 24. Activated Trevor van Riemsdyk from injured reserve.
- December 4, 2016 – Recalled G Lars Johansson from Rockford (AHL). Assigned F Nick Schmaltz to Rockford.
- December 6, 2016 – Placed G Corey Crawford on injured reserve, retroactive to Saturday.
- December 13, 2016 – Activated F Jonathan Toews from injured reserve.
- December 22, 2016 – Placed F Artem Anisimov on injured reserve, retroactive to Dec 18. Recalled F Tanner Kero from Rockford (AHL).
- December 27, 2016 – Activated F Artem Anisimov from injured reserve. Placed F Marian Hossa on injured reserve, retroactive to Dec 20.
- December 28, 2016 – Agreed to terms with F Artemi Panarin on a two-year contract extension.

==== January ====
- January 1, 2017 – Placed F Marcus Kruger on injured reserve, retroactive to Dec 30.
- January 4, 2017 – Assigned F Tyler Motte to Rockford (AHL). Recalled F Spencer Abbott from Rockford (AHL).
- January 5, 2017 – Activated F Marian Hossa from injured reserve.
- January 6, 2017 – Assigned D Gustav Forsling and F Spencer Abbott to Rockford (AHL).
- January 14, 2017 – Recalled F Nick Schmaltz from Rockford (AHL).
- January 21, 2017 – Acquired F Michael Latta from the Los Angeles Kings for D Cameron Schilling.
- January 24, 2017 – Activated F Marcus Kruger from injured reserve.
- January 29, 2017 – Placed D Michal Rozsival on injured reserve, retroactive to Jan 25. Recalled D Gustav Forsling from Rockford (AHL).

==== February ====
- February 12, 2017 – Reassigned D Gustav Forsling and Fs Vinnie Hinostroza, Tanner Kero, and Nick Schmaltz to Rockford (AHL). Activated D Michal Roszival from injured reserve.
- February 16, 2017 – Recalled Fs Tanner Kero, and Nick Schmaltz from Rockford (AHL).
- February 19, 2017 – Recalled F Vinnie Hinostroza from Rockford (AHL).
- February 23, 2017 – Agreed to terms with G Jeff Glass on a two-year contract through the 2017–18 season.
- February 24, 2017 – Acquired F Tomas Jurco from Detroit Red Wings for a 2017 third-round draft pick. Reassigned F Vinnie Hinostroza to Rockford (AHL).
- February 25, 2017 – Assigned G Jeff Glass to Rockford (AHL)
- February 26, 2017 – Recalled G Lars Johansson from Rockford (AHL)
- February 27, 2017 – Assigned G Lars Johansson to Rockford (AHL)

== Draft picks ==
Below are the Chicago Blackhawks' selections at the 2016 NHL entry draft, to be held on June 24–25, 2016 at the First Niagara Center in Buffalo.

Round	#	Player	Pos	Nationality	College/Junior/Club team (League)
2	39^{[a]}	Alex DeBrincat	RW	United States	Erie Otters (OHL)
2	45^{[b]}	Chad Krys	D	United States	U.S. NTDP (USHL)
2	50^{[c]}	Artur Kayumov	LW/RW	Russia	Russia U18 (MHL)
3	83	Wouter Peeters	G	Belgium	Red Bull Salzburg (Austria)
4	110^{[d]}	Lucas Carlsson	D	Sweden	Brynäs IF (SHL)
4	113	Nathan Noel	C	Canada	Saint John Sea Dogs (QMJHL)
5	143	Mathias From	LW/RW	Denmark	Rögle BK-jr. (SWE-jr.)
6	173	Blake Hillman	D	United States	University of Denver NCAA
7	203	Jake Ryczek	D	United States	Waterloo Black Hawks (USHL)

Notes

- The Chicago Blackhawks' first-round pick went to the Philadelphia Flyers as the result of a trade on June 24, 2016, that sent a first and third-round pick both in 2016 (18th and 79th overall) to Winnipeg in exchange for a second-round pick in 2016 (36th overall) and this pick.

Winnipeg previously acquired this pick from Chicago as the result of a trade on February 25, 2016, that sent Andrew Ladd, Jay Harrison and Matt Fraser to Chicago in exchange for Marko Dano, a conditional third-round pick in 2018 and this pick.

- ^{[a]} The Montreal Canadiens' second-round pick went to the Chicago Blackhawks as the result of a trade on June 24, 2016, that sent Andrew Shaw to Montreal in exchange for Minnesota's second-round pick in 2016 (45th overall) and this pick.
- ^{[b]} The Minnesota Wild's second-round pick went to the Chicago Blackhawks as the result of a trade on June 24, 2016, that sent Andrew Shaw to Montreal in exchange for a second-round pick in 2016 (39th overall) and this pick.

Montreal previously acquired this pick as the result of a trade on July 1, 2014, that sent Josh Gorges to Buffalo in exchange for this pick.
Buffalo previously acquired this pick as the result of a trade on March 5, 2014, that sent Matt Moulson and Cody McCormick to Minnesota in exchange for Torrey Mitchell, Winnipeg's second-round pick in 2014 and this pick.

- ^{[c]} The New York Rangers' second-round pick went to the Chicago Blackhawks as the result of a trade on June 15, 2016, that sent Teuvo Teravainen and Bryan Bickell to Carolina in exchange for Chicago's third-round pick in 2017 and this pick.

Carolina previously acquired this pick as the result of a trade on February 28, 2016, that sent Eric Staal to New York in exchange for Aleksi Saarela, a second-round pick in 2017 and this pick.

- The Chicago Blackhawks' second-round pick went to the Philadelphia Flyers as the result of a trade on February 27, 2015, that sent Kimmo Timonen to Chicago in exchange for a second-round pick in 2015 and this pick (being conditional at the time of the trade). The condition – Philadelphia will receive a second-round pick in 2016 if Chicago advances to the 2015 Stanley Cup Finals with Timonen playing in at least 50% of the Blackhawks' playoff games – was converted on May 30, 2015.
- ^{[d]} The New York Islanders' fourth-round pick went to Chicago Blackhawks as the result of a trade on June 25, 2016, that sent Columbus' fourth-round pick in 2016 (95th overall) to New York in exchange for a sixth-round pick in 2017 and this pick.
