= 2016–17 Pittsburgh Penguins season =

NHL team season

2016–17 Pittsburgh Penguins
- Stanley Cup champions
- Eastern Conference champions
- Division: 2nd Metropolitan
- Conference: 2nd Eastern
- 2016–17 record: 50–21–11
- Home record: 31–6–4
- Road record: 19–15–7
- Goals for: 282
- Goals against: 234

Team information
- General manager: Jim Rutherford
- Coach: Mike Sullivan
- Captain: Sidney Crosby
- Alternate captains: Chris Kunitz; Evgeni Malkin
- Arena: PPG Paints Arena
- Average attendance: 19,762 (110.2%) (41 games)
- Minor league affiliates: WBS Penguins (AHL); Wheeling Nailers (ECHL)

Team leaders
- Goals: Sidney Crosby (44)
- Assists: Phil Kessel (47)
- Points: Sidney Crosby (89)
- Penalty minutes: Evgeni Malkin (77)
- Plus/minus: Justin Schultz (+27)
- Wins: Matt Murray (32)
- Goals against average: Matt Murray (2.41)

The 2016–17 Pittsburgh Penguins season was the 50th season for the National Hockey League ice hockey team that was established on June 5, 1967. The Penguins would win the Stanley Cup championship in back to back years, defeating the Nashville Predators in the 2017 Finals after winning the Stanley Cup in 2016.

== Off-season ==
On the first day of the 2016 NHL entry draft the Pittsburgh Penguins announced they will officially change their uniform colors from Black and Vegas Gold, used from 2002 to 2003 through 2015–16, back to the Black and "Pittsburgh Gold" they have used as an alternate jersey for the past two season revealing a new Visitor jersey reflecting the same format used in the early 1990s.

== Pre-season ==
=== Game log ===
2016 Pre-season game log: 3–3–0 (Home: 1–2–0; Road: 2–1–0)

#	Date	Time (ET)	Visitor	Score	Home	Location/Attendance	Record
1	Sept 27	7:30 pm	Pittsburgh Penguins	2–4	Detroit Red Wings	Joe Louis Arena (16,279)	0–1–0
2	Sept 28	8:30 pm	Pittsburgh Penguins	2–0	Chicago Blackhawks	United Center (20,195)	1–1–0
3	Sept 30	7:00 pm	Chicago Blackhawks	0–1	Pittsburgh Penguins	Consol Energy Center (18,084)	2–1–0
4	Oct 2	4:00 pm	Pittsburgh Penguins	2–0	Columbus Blue Jackets	Nationwide Arena (11,966)	3–1–0
5	Oct 5	7:00 pm	Detroit Red Wings	5–2	Pittsburgh Penguins	PPG Paints Arena (17,848)	3–2–0
6	Oct 8	4:00 pm	Columbus Blue Jackets	5–3	Pittsburgh Penguins	PPG Paints Arena (18,258)	3–3–0

Legend: = Win = Loss = OT/SO Loss

=== Statistics ===
Final
Note – Statistics compiled from Official Game/Event Summaries from NHL.com

Preseason statistics

Skaters
Player	GP	G	A	Pts	+/−	PIM
Scott Wilson	5	2	3	5	1	4
Eric Fehr	4	0	3	3	4	2
Chris Kunitz	3	2	1	3	3	4
Kris Letang	2	2	0	2	2	0
Evgeni Malkin	2	1	1	2	–1	2
Garrett Wilson	4	2	0	2	1	24
Carter Rowney	5	2	0	2	2	0
Tom Kostopoulos	1	0	1	1	2	0
Olli Maatta	2	0	1	1	–1	2
Matt Cullen	2	0	1	1	–2	0
Trevor Daley	3	0	1	1	–1	0
Cameron Gaunce	2	0	1	1	2	0
Nick Bonino	3	0	1	1	–1	0
Conor Sheary	4	0	1	1	–2	0
David Warsofsky	3	0	1	1	0	0
Brian Dumoulin	4	0	1	1	4	0
Justin Schultz	5	0	1	1	1	2
Kevin Porter	4	0	1	1	1	0
Tom Kuhnhackl	5	1	0	1	0	2
Josh Archibald	4	0	1	1	1	0
Ian Cole	2	0	0	0	–1	0
Reid McNeill	1	0	0	0	–1	0
Ethan Prow	1	0	0	0	1	0
Sahir Gill	1	0	0	0	0	0
Ryan Haggerty	1	0	0	0	0	0
Carl Hagelin	1	0	0	0	0	2
Adam Krause	1	0	0	0	0	0
Patric Hornqvist	2	0	0	0	–3	0
Phil Kessel	2	0	0	0	–2	2
Stuart Percy	2	0	0	0	–1	0
Chad Ruhwedel	2	0	0	0	0	2
Steve Oleksy	3	0	0	0	1	11
Tom Sestito	5	0	0	0	0	17
Jean-Sebastien Dea	4	0	0	0	0	4
Dominik Simon	4	0	0	0	–1	2
Derrick Pouliot	4	0	0	0	–1	4
Jake Guentzel	5	0	0	0	0	2

Goaltenders
Player	GP	GS	TOI	W	L	OT	GA	GAA	SA	SV%	SO	G	A	PIM
Tristan Jarry	2	2	119:50	2	0	0	0	0.00	54	1.000	2	0	0	0
Marc-Andre Fleury	4	4	213:49	1	3	0	12	3.37	103	0.896	1	0	0	0
Casey DeSmith	1	0	18:10	0	0	0	1	3.30	5	0.800	0	0	0	0
Total		6	351:49	3	3	0	13	2.22	162	0.926	3	0	0	0

== Regular season ==
=== Game log ===
2016–17 schedule
October: 6–2–1 (Home: 5–0–1; Road: 1–2–0), 13 Points

#	Oct	Time (ET)	Visitor	Score	Home	Location/Attendance	Record	Points
1	13	7:00 pm	Washington Capitals	2–3 SO	Pittsburgh Penguins	PPG Paints Arena (18,630)	1–0–0	2
2	15	7:00 pm	Anaheim Ducks	2–3	Pittsburgh Penguins	PPG Paints Arena (18,452)	2–0–0	4
3	17	7:00 pm	Colorado Avalanche	4–3 OT	Pittsburgh Penguins	PPG Paints Arena (18,431)	2–0–1	5
4	18	7:30 pm	Pittsburgh Penguins	0–4	Montreal Canadiens	Bell Centre (21,288)	2–1–1	5
5	20	7:00 pm	San Jose Sharks	2–3	Pittsburgh Penguins	PPG Paints Arena (18,511)	3–1–1	7
6	22	8:00 pm	Pittsburgh Penguins	1–5	Nashville Predators	Bridgestone Arena (17,113)	3–2–1	7
7	25	7:00 pm	Florida Panthers	2–3	Pittsburgh Penguins	PPG Paints Arena (18,434)	4–2–1	9
8	27	7:00 pm	New York Islanders	2–4	Pittsburgh Penguins	PPG Paints Arena (18,422)	5–2–1	11
9	29	7:00 pm	Pittsburgh Penguins	5–4	Philadelphia Flyers	Wells Fargo Center (19,927)	6–2–1	13

November: 7–5–2 (Home: 3–2–0; Road: 4–3–2), 16 Points

#	Nov	Time (ET)	Visitor	Score	Home	Location/Attendance	Record	Points
10	2	10:30 pm	Pittsburgh Penguins	5–1	Anaheim Ducks	Honda Center (15,543)	7–2–1	15
11	3	10:30 pm	Pittsburgh Penguins	2–3 OT	Los Angeles Kings	Staples Center (18,230)	7–2–2	16
12	5	10:30 pm	Pittsburgh Penguins	5–0	San Jose Sharks	SAP Center at San Jose (17,562)	8–2–2	18
13	8	7:00 pm	Edmonton Oilers	3–4	Pittsburgh Penguins	PPG Paints Arena (18,576)	9–2–2	20
14	10	7:00 pm	Minnesota Wild	4–2	Pittsburgh Penguins	PPG Paints Arena (18,458)	9–3–2	20
15	12	7:00 pm	Toronto Maple Leafs	1–4	Pittsburgh Penguins	PPG Paints Arena (18,668)	10–3–2	22
16	16	8:00 pm	Pittsburgh Penguins	1–7	Washington Capitals	Verizon Center (18,506)	10–4–2	22
17	18	7:00 pm	Pittsburgh Penguins	3–2 OT	New York Islanders	Barclays Center (13,365)	11–4–2	24
18	19	7:00 pm	Pittsburgh Penguins	1–2 SO	Buffalo Sabres	First Niagara Center (18,817)	11–4–3	25
19	21	7:00 pm	New York Rangers	5–2	Pittsburgh Penguins	PPG Paints Arena (18,632)	11–5–3	25
20	23	7:00 pm	Pittsburgh Penguins	6–1	New York Rangers	Madison Square Garden (IV) (18,006)	12–5–3	27
21	25	4:00 pm	Pittsburgh Penguins	2–6	Minnesota Wild	Xcel Energy Center (19,212)	12–6–3	27
22	26	7:00 pm	New Jersey Devils	3–4 SO	Pittsburgh Penguins	PPG Paints Arena (18,615)	13–6–3	29
23	30	8:00 pm	Pittsburgh Penguins	3–5	New York Islanders	Barclays Center (12,149)	13–7–3	29

December: 12–1–2 (Home: 9–0–1; Road: 3–1–1), 26 Points

#	Dec	Time (ET)	Visitor	Score	Home	Location/Attendance	Record	Points
24	1	7:00 pm	Dallas Stars	2–6	Pittsburgh Penguins	PPG Paints Arena (18,420)	14–7–3	31
25	3	7:00 pm	Detroit Red Wings	3–5	Pittsburgh Penguins	PPG Paints Arena (18,661)	15–7–3	33
26	5	7:00 pm	Ottawa Senators	5–8	Pittsburgh Penguins	PPG Paints Arena (18,414)	16–7–3	35
27	8	7:30 pm	Pittsburgh Penguins	5–1	Florida Panthers	BB&T Center (14,068)	17–7–3	37
28	10	7:00 pm	Pittsburgh Penguins	4–3	Tampa Bay Lightning	Amalie Arena (19,092)	18–7–3	39
29	12	7:00 pm	Arizona Coyotes	0–7	Pittsburgh Penguins	PPG Paints Arena (18,420)	19–7–3	41
30	14	7:30 pm	Boston Bruins	3–4 OT	Pittsburgh Penguins	PPG Paints Arena (18,415)	20–7–3	43
31	16	7:00 pm	Los Angeles Kings	1–0 OT	Pittsburgh Penguins	PPG Paints Arena (18,544)	20–7–4	44
32	17	7:00 pm	Pittsburgh Penguins	1–2 OT	Toronto Maple Leafs	Air Canada Centre (19,553)	20–7–5	45
33	20	7:00 pm	New York Rangers	2–7	Pittsburgh Penguins	PPG Paints Arena (18,541)	21–7–5	47
34	22	7:00 pm	Pittsburgh Penguins	1–7	Columbus Blue Jackets	Nationwide Arena (19,115)	21–8–5	47
35	23	7:00 pm	New Jersey Devils	1–4	Pittsburgh Penguins	PPG Paints Arena (18,625)	22–8–5	49
36	27	7:00 pm	Pittsburgh Penguins	5–2	New Jersey Devils	Prudential Center (16,514)	23–8–5	51
37	28	7:00 pm	Carolina Hurricanes	2–3	Pittsburgh Penguins	PPG Paints Arena (18,653)	24–8–5	53
38	31	7:00 pm	Montreal Canadiens	3–4 OT	Pittsburgh Penguins	PPG Paints Arena (18,633)	25–8–5	55

January: 6–5–0 (Home: 4–1–0; Road: 2–4–0), 12 Points

#	Jan	Time (ET)	Visitor	Score	Home	Location/Attendance	Record	Points
39	8	1:00 pm	Tampa Bay Lightning	2–6	Pittsburgh Penguins	PPG Paints Arena (18,633)	26–8–5	57
40	11	8:00 pm	Pittsburgh Penguins	2–5	Washington Capitals	Verizon Center (18,506)	26–9–5	57
41	12	7:30 pm	Pittsburgh Penguins	1–4	Ottawa Senators	Canadian Tire Centre (17,769)	26–10–5	57
42	14	7:00 pm	Pittsburgh Penguins	3–6	Detroit Red Wings	Joe Louis Arena (20,027)	26–11–5	57
43	16	7:00 pm	Washington Capitals	7–8 OT	Pittsburgh Penguins	PPG Paints Arena (18,653)	27–11–5	59
44	18	7:30 pm	Pittsburgh Penguins	4–1	Montreal Canadiens	Bell Centre (21,288)	28–11–5	61
45	20	7:00 pm	Pittsburgh Penguins	7–1	Carolina Hurricanes	PNC Arena (17,312)	29–11–5	63
46	22	3:00 pm	Boston Bruins	1–5	Pittsburgh Penguins	PPG Paints Arena (18,506)	30–11–5	65
47	24	7:00 pm	St. Louis Blues	3–0	Pittsburgh Penguins	PPG Paints Arena (18,563)	30–12–5	65
48	26	7:00 pm	Pittsburgh Penguins	3–4	Boston Bruins	TD Garden (17,565)	30–13–5	65
27–29		All-Star Break in Los Angeles				Staples Center		
49	31	7:00 pm	Nashville Predators	2–4	Pittsburgh Penguins	PPG Paints Arena (18,455)	31–13–5	67

February: 7–2–3 (Home: 4–1–1; Road: 3–1–2), 17 Points

#	Feb	Time (ET)	Visitor	Score	Home	Location/Attendance	Record	Points
50	3	7:00 pm	Columbus Blue Jackets	3–4 OT	Pittsburgh Penguins	PPG Paints Arena (18,649)	32–13–5	69
51	4	8:00 pm	Pittsburgh Penguins	4–1	St. Louis Blues	Scottrade Center (19,496)	33–13–5	71
52	7	7:00 pm	Calgary Flames	3–2 SO	Pittsburgh Penguins	PPG Paints Arena (18,556)	33–13–6	72
53	9	9:00 pm	Pittsburgh Penguins	4–1	Colorado Avalanche	Pepsi Center (16,777)	34–13–6	74
54	11	8:00 pm	Pittsburgh Penguins	3–4 OT	Arizona Coyotes	Gila River Arena (15,879)	34–13–7	75
55	14	7:00 pm	Vancouver Canucks	0–4	Pittsburgh Penguins	PPG Paints Arena (18,653)	35–13–7	77
56	16	7:00 pm	Winnipeg Jets	3–4 OT	Pittsburgh Penguins	PPG Paints Arena (18,638)	36–13–7	79
57	17	7:00 pm	Pittsburgh Penguins	1–2 OT	Columbus Blue Jackets	Nationwide Arena (19,188)	36–13–8	80
58	19	3:00 pm	Detroit Red Wings	5–2	Pittsburgh Penguins	PPG Paints Arena (18,664)	36–14–8	80
59	21	7:00 pm	Pittsburgh Penguins	3–1	Carolina Hurricanes	PNC Arena (12,145)	37–14–8	82
60	25	8:00 pm	Philadelphia Flyers	2–4	Pittsburgh Penguins	Heinz Field (67,318)	38–14–8	84
61	28	8:30 pm	Pittsburgh Penguins	2–3	Dallas Stars	American Airlines Center (18,235)	38–15–8	84

March: 9–4–3 (Home: 4–2–1; Road: 5–2–2), 21 Points

#	Mar	Time (ET)	Visitor	Score	Home	Location/Attendance	Record	Points
62	1	8:00 pm	Pittsburgh Penguins	1–4	Chicago Blackhawks	United Center (22,012)	38–16–8	84
63	3	7:00 pm	Tampa Bay Lightning	2–5	Pittsburgh Penguins	PPG Paints Arena (18,640)	39–16–8	86
64	5	5:00 pm	Buffalo Sabres	3–4	Pittsburgh Penguins	PPG Paints Arena (18,653)	40–16–8	88
65	8	8:00 pm	Pittsburgh Penguins	7–4	Winnipeg Jets	MTS Centre (15,294)	41–16–8	90
66	10	9:00 pm	Pittsburgh Penguins	3–2 SO	Edmonton Oilers	Rogers Place (18,347)	42–16–8	92
67	11	10:00 pm	Pittsburgh Penguins	3–0	Vancouver Canucks	Rogers Arena (18,865)	43–16–8	94
68	13	9:00 pm	Pittsburgh Penguins	3–4 SO	Calgary Flames	Scotiabank Saddledome (19,289)	43–16–9	95
69	15	7:30 pm	Pittsburgh Penguins	0–4	Philadelphia Flyers	Wells Fargo Center (19,514)	43–17–9	95
70	17	7:00 pm	New Jersey Devils	4–6	Pittsburgh Penguins	PPG Paints Arena (18,651)	44–17–9	97
71	19	1:00 pm	Florida Panthers	0–4	Pittsburgh Penguins	PPG Paints Arena (18,653)	45–17–9	99
72	21	7:00 pm	Pittsburgh Penguins	3–1	Buffalo Sabres	First Niagara Center (18,313)	46–17–9	101
73	23	7:30 pm	Pittsburgh Penguins	1–2 SO	Ottawa Senators	Canadian Tire Centre (18,102)	46–17–10	102
74	24	7:00 pm	New York Islanders	4–3 SO	Pittsburgh Penguins	PPG Paints Arena (18,659)	46–17–11	103
75	26	7:00 pm	Philadelphia Flyers	6–2	Pittsburgh Penguins	PPG Paints Arena (18,654)	46–18–11	103
76	29	8:00 pm	Chicago Blackhawks	5–1	Pittsburgh Penguins	PPG Paints Arena (18,657)	46–19–11	103
77	31	7:00 pm	Pittsburgh Penguins	4–3 SO	New York Rangers	Madison Square Garden (IV) (18,006)	47–19–11	105

April: 3–2–0 (Home: 2–0–0; Road: 1–2–0), 6 Points

#	Apr	Time (ET)	Visitor	Score	Home	Location/Attendance	Record	Points
78	2	5:00 pm	Carolina Hurricanes	2–3	Pittsburgh Penguins	PPG Paints Arena (18,631)	48–19–11	107
79	4	7:00 pm	Columbus Blue Jackets	1–4	Pittsburgh Penguins	PPG Paints Arena (18,632)	49–19–11	109
80	6	7:00 pm	Pittsburgh Penguins	7–4	New Jersey Devils	Prudential Center (14,012)	50–19–11	111
81	8	7:00 pm	Pittsburgh Penguins	3–5	Toronto Maple Leafs	Air Canada Centre (19,561)	50–20–11	111
82	9	7:00 pm	Pittsburgh Penguins	2–3	New York Rangers	Madison Square Garden (IV) (18,006)	50–21–11	111

Legend: = Win = Loss = OT/SO Loss

=== Season standings ===
Metropolitan Division
Pos	Team	GP	W	L	OTL	ROW	GF	GA	GD	Pts
1	p – Washington Capitals	82	55	19	8	53	263	182	+81	118
2	x – Pittsburgh Penguins	82	50	21	11	46	282	234	+48	111
3	x – Columbus Blue Jackets	82	50	24	8	47	249	195	+54	108
4	x – New York Rangers	82	48	28	6	45	256	220	+36	102
5	New York Islanders	82	41	29	12	39	241	242	−1	94
6	Philadelphia Flyers	82	39	33	10	32	219	236	−17	88
7	Carolina Hurricanes	82	36	31	15	33	215	236	−21	87
8	New Jersey Devils	82	28	40	14	25	183	244	−61	70

Source: National Hockey League
p – Clinched Presidents' Trophy; x – Clinched playoff spot

=== Detailed records ===
Final

Eastern Conference
Atlantic	GP	W	L	OT	SHOTS	GF	GA	PP	PK	FO W–L
Boston Bruins	3	2	1	0	96–126	12	8	4–10	1–13	87–118
Buffalo Sabres	3	2	0	1	127–112	8	5	3–10	1–10	97–102
Detroit Red Wings	3	1	2	0	94–89	10	14	1–11	1–11	86–102
Florida Panthers	3	3	0	0	80–72	12	3	1–9	2–11	77–85
Montreal Canadiens	3	2	1	0	103–92	8	8	1–15	1–9	99–116
Ottawa Senators	3	1	1	1	111–97	10	10	1–10	6–12	91–103
Tampa Bay Lightning	3	3	0	0	112–82	15	7	6–11	3–11	97–85
Toronto Maple Leafs	3	1	1	1	101–115	8	8	3–9	1–9	79–86
Division Total	24	15	6	3	824–785	83	63	20–84	16–85	713–797

Metropolitan	GP	W	L	OT	SHOTS	GF	GA	PP	PK	FO W–L
Carolina Hurricanes	4	4	0	0	115–139	16	6	4–9	2–11	109–137
Columbus Blue Jackets	4	2	1	1	125–137	10	13	1–8	1–8	95–135
New Jersey Devils	5	5	0	0	188–151	25	14	5–17	4–18	170–175
New York Islanders	4	2	1	1	144–135	13	12	3–14	2–13	128–127
New York Rangers	5	3	2	0	175–139	20	14	3–13	3–10	149–165
Philadelphia Flyers	4	2	2	0	106–141	11	16	3–11	3–12	102–143
Pittsburgh Penguins										
Washington Capitals	4	2	2	0	125–138	13	21	4–13	5–19	122–162
Division Total	30	20	8	2	978–980	108	96	23–95	20–91	841–1006
Conference Total	54	35	14	5	1802–1765	191	159	43–170	35–177	1588–1841

Western Conference
Central	GP	W	L	OT	SHOTS	GF	GA	PP	PK	FO W–L
Chicago Blackhawks	2	0	2	0	69–65	2	9	0–2	0–5	56–48
Colorado Avalanche	2	1	0	1	61–59	7	5	3–8	3–9	66–54
Dallas Stars	2	1	1	0	60–67	8	5	1–6	1–4	69–55
Minnesota Wild	2	0	2	0	77–80	4	10	2–7	4–7	63–63
Nashville Predators	2	1	1	0	73–69	5	7	1–5	2–6	68–71
St. Louis Blues	2	1	1	0	65–51	4	4	0–11	1–4	61–65
Winnipeg Jets	2	2	0	0	71–82	11	7	4–7	0–9	65–71
Division Total	14	6	7	1	476–473	41	47	11–46	11–44	448–427

Pacific	GP	W	L	OT	SHOTS	GF	GA	PP	PK	FO W–L
Anaheim Ducks	2	2	0	0	79–69	8	3	2–6	2–6	53–72
Arizona Coyotes	2	1	0	1	65–57	10	4	2–11	1–7	71–54
Calgary Flames	2	0	0	2	68–60	5	5	1–6	1–7	68–56
Edmonton Oilers	2	2	0	0	63–70	6	5	0–5	1–4	39–65
Los Angeles Kings	2	0	0	2	62–55	2	4	0–7	0–4	60–70
San Jose Sharks	2	2	0	0	45–66	8	2	1–6	0–8	58–68
Vancouver Canucks	2	2	0	0	90–56	7	0	0–5	0–2	66–49
Division Total	14	9	0	5	472–433	46	23	6–46	5–38	405–434
Conference Total	28	15	7	6	948–906	87	70	17–92	15–81	863–861
NHL Total	82	50	21	11	2750–2672	278	229	58–262	52–259	2472–2702

== Playoffs ==
Bryan Rust scores the series-winning goal against the Washington Capitals in Game 7 of the Eastern Conference Second Round

=== Game log ===
2017 Stanley Cup playoffs
Eastern Conference First Round vs. (M3) Columbus Blue Jackets: Penguins won 4–1

#	Date	Visitor	Score	Home	OT	Starting Goalie	Attendance	Series	Recap
1	April 12	Columbus	1–3	Pittsburgh		Fleury	18,563	1–0	Recap
2	April 14	Columbus	1–4	Pittsburgh		Fleury	18,622	2–0	Recap
3	April 16	Pittsburgh	5–4	Columbus	OT	Fleury	19,092	3–0	Recap
4	April 18	Pittsburgh	4–5	Columbus		Fleury	19,093	3–1	Recap
5	April 20	Columbus	2–5	Pittsburgh		Fleury	18,585	4–1	Recap

Eastern Conference Second Round vs. (M1) Washington Capitals: Penguins won 4–3

#	Date	Visitor	Score	Home	OT	Starting Goalie	Attendance	Series	Recap
1	April 27	Pittsburgh	3–2	Washington		Fleury	18,506	1–0	Recap
2	April 29	Pittsburgh	6–2	Washington		Fleury	18,506	2–0	Recap
3	May 1	Washington	3–2	Pittsburgh	OT	Fleury	18,625	2–1	Recap
4	May 3	Washington	2–3	Pittsburgh		Fleury	18,617	3–1	Recap
5	May 6	Pittsburgh	2–4	Washington		Fleury	18,506	3–2	Recap
6	May 8	Washington	5–2	Pittsburgh		Fleury	18,594	3–3	Recap
7	May 10	Pittsburgh	2–0	Washington		Fleury	18,506	4–3	Recap

Eastern Conference Finals vs. (A2) Ottawa Senators: Penguins won 4–3

#	Date	Visitor	Score	Home	OT	Starting Goalie	Attendance	Series	Recap
1	May 13	Ottawa	2–1	Pittsburgh	OT	Fleury	18,614	0–1	Recap
2	May 15	Ottawa	0–1	Pittsburgh		Fleury	18,610	1–1	Recap
3	May 17	Pittsburgh	1–5	Ottawa		Fleury	18,615	1–2	Recap
4	May 19	Pittsburgh	3–2	Ottawa		Murray	19,145	2–2	Recap
5	May 21	Ottawa	0–7	Pittsburgh		Murray	18,635	3–2	Recap
6	May 23	Pittsburgh	1–2	Ottawa		Murray	18,111	3–3	Recap
7	May 25	Ottawa	2–3	Pittsburgh	2OT	Murray	18,604	4–3	Recap

Stanley Cup Finals vs. (WC2) Nashville Predators: Penguins won 4–2

#	Date	Visitor	Score	Home	OT	Starting Goalie	Attendance	Series	Recap
1	May 29	Nashville	3–5	Pittsburgh		Murray	18,618	1–0	Recap
2	May 31	Nashville	1–4	Pittsburgh		Murray	18,643	2–0	Recap
3	June 3	Pittsburgh	1–5	Nashville		Murray	17,283	2–1	Recap
4	June 5	Pittsburgh	1–4	Nashville		Murray	17,260	2–2	Recap
5	June 8	Nashville	0–6	Pittsburgh		Murray	18,605	3–2	Recap
6	June 11	Pittsburgh	2–0	Nashville		Murray	17,271	4–2	Recap

Legend: = Win = Loss = Playoff series win

== Player statistics ==
Skaters

Regular season
Player	GP	G	A	Pts	+/−	PIM
Sidney Crosby	75	44	45	89	17	24
Evgeni Malkin	62	33	39	72	18	77
Phil Kessel	82	23	47	70	3	20
Conor Sheary	61	23	30	53	24	22
Justin Schultz	78	12	39	51	27	34
Patric Hornqvist	70	21	23	44	16	28
Nick Bonino	80	18	19	37	-5	16
Kris Letang	41	5	29	34	2	32
Jake Guentzel	40	16	17	33	7	10
Matt Cullen	72	13	18	31	4	30
Chris Kunitz	71	9	20	29	0	36
Bryan Rust	57	15	13	28	4	8
Scott Wilson	78	8	18	26	0	32
Ian Cole	81	5	21	26	26	72
Carl Hagelin	61	6	16	22	10	16
Trevor Daley	56	5	14	19	7	37
Tom Kuhnhackl	57	4	12	16	8	18
Brian Dumoulin	70	1	14	15	0	14
Eric Fehr^{‡}	52	6	5	11	3	14
Chad Ruhwedel	34	2	8	10	9	8
Carter Rowney	27	3	4	7	2	4
Olli Maatta	55	1	6	7	17	12
Mark Streit^{†}	19	1	5	6	-2	6
Cameron Gaunce	12	1	3	4	1	13
Josh Archibald	10	3	0	3	3	4
Ron Hainsey^{†}	16	0	3	3	8	4
Tom Sestito	13	0	2	2	0	48
David Warsofsky	7	0	1	1	-3	6
Steve Oleksy	11	0	1	1	2	24
Dominik Simon	2	0	1	1	-1	0
Kevin Porter	2	0	0	0	-1	0
Frank Corrado	2	0	0	0	-1	2
Derrick Pouliot	11	0	0	0	-4	4
Oskar Sundqvist	10	0	0	0	-4	2
Jean-Sebastien Dea	1	0	0	0	0	2
Total		278	473	751	—	679

Playoffs
Player	GP	G	A	Pts	+/−	PIM
Evgeni Malkin	25	10	18	28	9	53
Sidney Crosby	24	8	19	27	4	10
Phil Kessel	25	8	15	23	12	2
Jake Guentzel	25	13	8	21	1	10
Justin Schultz	21	4	9	13	3	4
Chris Kunitz	20	2	9	11	6	27
Bryan Rust	23	7	2	9	5	10
Patric Hornqvist	19	5	4	9	6	18
Matt Cullen	25	2	7	9	-1	24
Ian Cole	25	0	9	9	2	22
Ron Hainsey	25	2	6	8	5	6
Olli Maatta	25	2	6	8	8	12
Nick Bonino	21	4	3	7	4	2
Conor Sheary	22	2	5	7	-5	4
Scott Wilson	20	3	3	6	4	11
Brian Dumoulin	25	1	5	6	9	6
Trevor Daley	21	1	4	5	7	24
Carter Rowney	20	0	3	3	3	4
Carl Hagelin	15	2	0	2	-2	19
Tom Kuhnhackl	11	1	1	2	2	4
Mark Streit	3	0	2	2	-1	0
Josh Archibald	4	0	0	0	-1	2
Chad Ruhwedel	6	0	0	0	-3	4
Total		77	138	215	—	278

Goaltenders

Regular season
Player	GP	GS	TOI	W	L	OT	GA	GAA	SA	SV%	SO	G	A	PIM
Matt Murray	49	47	2765:48	32	10	4	111	2.41	1450	0.923	4	0	2	0
Marc-Andre Fleury	38	34	2125:15	18	10	7	107	3.02	1181	0.909	1	0	0	6
Mike Condon^{‡}	1	0	20:00	0	0	0	0	0.00	7	1.000	0	0	0	0
Tristan Jarry	1	1	58:45	0	1	0	3	3.06	25	0.880	0	0	0	0
Total		82	4969:48	50	21	11	221	2.67	2663	0.917	5	0	2	6

Playoffs
Player	GP	GS	TOI	W	L	OT	GA	GAA	SA	SV%	SO	G	A	PIM
Marc-Andre Fleury	15	15	866:31	9	6	--	37	2.56	490	0.924	2	0	0	0
Matt Murray	11	10	668:55	7	3	--	19	1.70	303	0.937	3	0	0	0
Total		25	1535:26	16	9	0	56	2.19	793	0.929	5	0	0	0

^{†}Denotes player spent time with another team before joining the Penguins. Stats reflect time with the Penguins only.
^{‡}Denotes player was traded mid-season. Stats reflect time with the Penguins only.

== Notable achievements ==
=== Awards ===
Regular season
Player	Award	Awarded
M. Fleury	NHL Third Star of the Week	January 2, 2017
E. Malkin	NHL Second Star of the Month	January 3, 2017
C. Sheary	NHL First Star of the Week	January 23, 2017
S. Crosby	NHL Second Star of the Week	March 20, 2017

=== Milestones ===
Regular season
Player	Milestone	Reached
M. Cullen	1,300th career NHL game	October 22, 2016
B. Dumoulin	100th career NHL game	October 25, 2016
E. Malkin	300th career NHL goal	October 29, 2016
C. Hagelin	100th career NHL assist	November 5, 2016
J. Guentzel	1st career NHL game 1st career NHL goal 1st career NHL point	November 21, 2016
P. Kessel	600th career NHL point	November 25, 2016
J. Guentzel	1st career NHL assist	November 25, 2016
N. Bonino	100th career NHL assist	November 25, 2016
E. Fehr	100th career NHL goal	December 1, 2016
B. Rust	1st career NHL hat-trick	December 5, 2016
J. Schultz	300th career NHL game	December 22, 2016
O. Maatta	200th career NHL game	December 23, 2016
C. Ruhwedel	1st career NHL goal	December 23, 2016
E. Malkin	800th career NHL point	December 27, 2016
I. Cole	300th career NHL game	January 16, 2017
J. Schultz	100th career NHL assist	January 16, 2017
E. Fehr	200th career NHL point	January 20, 2017
B. Rust	100th career NHL game	January 26, 2017
C. Rowney	1st career NHL game	January 31, 2017
P. Kessel	800th career NHL game	February 3, 2017
C. Rowney	1st career NHL assist 1st career NHL point	February 4, 2017
J. Archibald	1st career NHL goal 1st career NHL point	February 11, 2017
T. Daley	200th career NHL assist	February 14, 2017
K. Letang	600th career NHL game	February 16, 2017
S. Crosby	1,000th career NHL point	February 16, 2017
E. Malkin	500th career NHL assist	February 17, 2017
C. Hagelin	400th career NHL game	February 21, 2017
E. Malkin	700th career NHL game	March 3, 2017
R. Hainsey	900th career NHL game	March 13, 2017
C. Rowney	1st career NHL goal	March 17, 2017
S. Crosby	10th career NHL hat-trick	March 19, 2017
N. Bonino	400th career NHL game	March 24, 2017
C. Sheary	100th career NHL game	March 29, 2017
S. Wilson	100th career NHL game	April 4, 2017
T. Jarry	1st career NHL game	April 9, 2017
J. Dea	1st career NHL game	April 9, 2017

Playoffs
Player	Milestone	Reached
R. Hainsey	1st career playoff game	April 12, 2017
J. Guentzel	1st career playoff game	April 12, 2017
S. Wilson	1st career playoff game	April 12, 2017
C. Rowney	1st career playoff game	April 12, 2017
M. Cullen	100th career playoff game	April 14, 2017
S. Crosby	50th career playoff goal	April 14, 2017
J. Guentzel	1st career playoff assist 1st career playoff goal 1st career playoff point	April 14, 2017
R. Hainsey	1st career playoff assist 1st career playoff point	April 16, 2017
E. Malkin	50th career playoff goal	April 16, 2017
J. Guentzel	1st career playoff hat-trick	April 16, 2017
R. Hainsey	1st career playoff goal	April 18, 2017
P. Kessel	50th career playoff point	April 20, 2017
S. Wilson	1st career playoff goal 1st career playoff point	April 20, 2017
S. Wilson	1st career playoff assist	April 27, 2017
M. Cullen	50th career playoff point	April 29, 2017
J. Schultz	1st career playoff goal	May 1, 2017
C. Hagelin	100th career playoff game	May 3, 2017
C. Ruhwedel	1st career playoff game	May 8, 2017
S. Crosby	150th career playoff point	May 8, 2017
M. Fleury	10th career playoff shutout	May 15, 2017
J. Archibald	1st career playoff game	May 19, 2017
O. Maatta	1st career playoff goal	May 19, 2017
C. Rowney	1st career playoff assist 1st career playoff point	May 21, 2017
S. Crosby	100th career playoff assist	May 21, 2017
E. Malkin	150th career playoff point	May 21, 2017

== Transactions ==
The Penguins have been involved in the following transactions during the 2016–17 season:

=== Trades ===
June 25, 2016	To New Jersey Devils Beau Bennett	To Pittsburgh Penguins 2016 third-round pick
November 2, 2016	To Ottawa Senators Mike Condon	To Pittsburgh Penguins 2017 fifth-round pick
November 19, 2016	To St. Louis Blues Reid McNeill	To Pittsburgh Penguins Danny Kristo
February 23, 2017	To Carolina Hurricanes Danny Kristo; 2017 second-round pick	To Pittsburgh Penguins Ron Hainsey^{[Note 1]}
March 1, 2017	To Toronto Maple Leafs Eric Fehr; Steven Oleksy; 2017 fourth-round pick	To Pittsburgh Penguins Frank Corrado
March 1, 2017	To Tampa Bay Lightning 2018 fourth-round pick	To Pittsburgh Penguins Mark Streit^{[Note 2]}

Notes

- ^{Note 1} Carolina to retain 50% ($1.25 million) of salary as part of trade.
- ^{Note 2} Tampa Bay to retain 50% ($2.50 million) of salary as part of trade.

=== Free agents ===
Player	Acquired from	Lost to	Date	Contract terms
Matthias Plachta		Adler Mannheim	June 30, 2016	N/A
Stuart Percy	Toronto Maple Leafs		July 1, 2016	1 year/$575,000
David Warsofsky	New Jersey Devils		July 1, 2016	1 year/$575,000
Ben Lovejoy		New Jersey Devils	July 1, 2016	3 years/$7.98 million
Cameron Gaunce	Florida Panthers		July 1, 2016	1 year/$575,000
Chad Ruhwedel	Buffalo Sabres		July 1, 2016	1 year/$575,000
Jeff Zatkoff		Los Angeles Kings	July 1, 2016	2 years/$1.80 million
Will O'Neill		Philadelphia Flyers	July 1, 2016	2 years/$1.225 million
Garrett Wilson	Florida Panthers		July 7, 2016	1 year/$575,000
Kael Mouillierat		Luleå HF	July 21, 2016	1 year
James Melindy		Wichita Thunder	August 16, 2016	1 year
Thomas Di Pauli	University of Notre Dame		August 19, 2016	2 years/$1.85 million^{[b]}
Harrison Ruopp		Allen Americans	September 28, 2016	1 year
Tyler Biggs		Kalamazoo Wings	October 19, 2016	1 year
Zach Aston-Reese	Northeastern University		March 14, 2017	2 years/$1.85 million^{[b]}

=== Waivers ===
Player	Claimed from	Lost to	Date
Mike Condon	Montreal Canadiens		October 11, 2016

=== Signings ===
Player	Date	Contract terms
Tom Sestito	July 1, 2016	1 year/$575,000^{[a]}
Steven Oleksy	July 1, 2016	1 year/$575,000^{[a]}
Justin Schultz	July 13, 2016	1 year/$1.4 million
Matt Cullen	August 17, 2016	1 year/$1 million
Jeff Taylor	March 27, 2017	2 years/$1.85 million^{[b]}
Filip Gustavsson	June 16, 2017	3 years/$2.775 million^{[b]}

=== Other ===
Name	Date	Details
Jim Rutherford	July 1, 2016	3 years contract extension
Jacques Martin	July 1, 2016	2 years contract extension
Mike Sullivan	December 26, 2016	3 years contract extension

Notes

- ^{a} – Two-way contract
- ^{b} – Entry-level contract

== Draft picks ==
Below are the Pittsburgh Penguins' selections at the 2016 NHL entry draft, held on June 24–25, 2016 at the First Niagara Center in Buffalo, New York.

Round	#	Player	Pos	Nationality	College/Junior/Club team (League)
2	55^{[a]}	Filip Gustavsson	G	Sweden	Lulea HF (SHL)
2	61^{[b]}	Kasper Bjorkqvist	RW	Finland	Espoo Blues (Liiga)
3	77^{[c]}	Connor Hall	D	Canada	Kitchener Rangers (OHL)
4	121	Ryan Jones	D	United States	Lincoln Stars (USHL)
5	151	Niclas Almari	D	Finland	Jokerit-jr. (FIN-jr.)
6	181	Joseph Masonius	D	United States	Connecticut Huskies (NCAA)

Draft notes

- The Pittsburgh Penguins first-round pick went to the Toronto Maple Leafs as the result of a July 1, 2015 trade that sent Phil Kessel, Tyler Biggs, Tim Erixon, a 2016 second-round conditional pick and cash to the Penguins in exchange for a Scott Harrington, Kasperi Kapanen, Nick Spaling, 2016 third-round pick and this conditional pick.
  - Condition(s) – 2016 first-round pick if Penguins qualify for 2016 playoffs, 2017 first-round pick if Penguins qualify for 2017 playoffs, else 2017 second-round pick.
- ^{a} The Vancouver Canucks second-round pick went to the Pittsburgh Penguins as a result of a July 28, 2015 trade that sent Brandon Sutter and a 2016 third-round pick to the Canucks in exchange for Nick Bonino, Adam Clendening and this pick.
- ^{b} The Toronto Maple Leafs second-round pick went to the Pittsburgh Penguins as a result of a July 1, 2015 trade that sent Scott Harrington, Kasperi Kapanen, Nick Spaling, a 2016 first-round conditional pick and a 2016 third-round pick to the Maple Leafs in exchange for Phil Kessel, Tyler Biggs, Tim Erixon, cash and this conditional pick.
  - Condition(s) – 2016 first-round pick if Penguins qualify for 2016 playoffs, 2017 first-round pick if Penguins qualify for 2017 playoffs.
- The Pittsburgh Penguins third-round pick (from Buffalo Sabres via New York Islanders originally Vancouver Canucks) went to the Vancouver Canucks as the result of a July 28, 2015 trade that sent Nick Bonino, Adam Clendening and a 2016 second-round pick to the Penguins in exchange for a Brandon Sutter and this pick.
- The Pittsburgh Penguins third-round pick (originally New Jersey Devils) went to the Toronto Maple Leafs as a result of a July 1, 2015 trade that sent Phil Kessel, Tyler Biggs, Tim Erixon, a 2016 second-round conditional pick and cash to the Penguins in exchange for Scott Harrington, Kasperi Kapanen, Nick Spaling, 2016 first-round conditional pick and this pick.
- ^{c} The New Jersey Devils third-round pick (originally Detroit Red Wings) went to the Pittsburgh Penguins as a result of a June 25, 2016 trade that sent Beau Bennett to the Devils in exchange for this pick.
- The Pittsburgh Penguins third-round pick went to the Edmonton Oilers as the result of a February 27, 2016 trade that sent Justin Schultz to the Penguins in exchange for this pick.
- The Pittsburgh Penguins seventh-round pick went to the St. Louis Blues as the result of a March 2, 2015 trade that sent Ian Cole to the Penguins in exchange for Robert Bortuzzo and this pick.
