= 2016–17 St. Louis Blues season =

National Hockey League team season

2016–17 St. Louis Blues
- Division: 3rd Central
- Conference: 5th Western
- 2016–17 record: 46–29–7
- Home record: 24–12–5
- Road record: 22–17–2
- Goals for: 235
- Goals against: 218

Team information
- General manager: Doug Armstrong
- Coach: Ken Hitchcock (Oct. 12 – Feb. 1); Mike Yeo (Feb. 1 – May 7)
- Captain: Alex Pietrangelo
- Alternate captains: Kevin Shattenkirk (Oct.–Feb.); Paul Stastny; Alexander Steen; Vladimir Tarasenko
- Arena: Scottrade Center
- Average attendance: 19,539
- Minor league affiliate: Chicago Wolves (AHL)

Team leaders
- Goals: Vladimir Tarasenko (39)
- Assists: Vladimir Tarasenko; Jaden Schwartz (36)
- Points: Vladimir Tarasenko (75)
- Penalty minutes: Ryan Reaves (104)
- Plus/minus: Jaden Schwartz (+15)
- Wins: Jake Allen (33)
- Goals against average: Carter Hutton (2.39)

The 2016–17 St. Louis Blues season was the 50th season for the National Hockey League (NHL) franchise that was established on June 5, 1967. The team played in its first Winter Classic game on January 2, 2017, defeating the Chicago Blackhawks 4–1 at Busch Stadium with 46,556 in attendance. It was only the third time in the nine Winter Classic games where the home team won. It was the Blues' first participation in an NHL Winter Classic game, while the Blackhawks lost for the third time in three appearances in the event.

== Off-season ==
After associate coach Brad Shaw and assistant coach Kirk Muller decided to leave for other opportunities in late May 2016, Mike Yeo was announced on June 13, 2016, to replace coach Ken Hitchcock after his last year starting in the 2017–18 season. Yeo joined the Blues as associate coach, while Rick Wilson joined the staff as an assistant coach. Ray Bennett (assistant coach), Jim Corsi (goaltender coach) and Sean Ferrell (video coach) also returned. Yeo spent the majority of the previous five seasons as the head coach of the Minnesota Wild, leading the club to a 173–132–44 record, including a 46–28–8 mark in 2014–15, which was the second-best record in Wild history. Yeo also guided the Wild to three postseason appearances, including back-to-back trips to the second round in 2014 and 2015.

The Blues signed restricted free agent Dmitrij Jaskin, and unrestricted free agents Scottie Upshall and Kyle Brodziak. Minor leaguer Jordan Caron was also signed.

Steve Thomas was added as an assistant coach on June 30. He had spent the previous two seasons as an assistant coach for the Tampa Bay Lightning.

== Regular season ==
=== December ===
On December 28, Robby Fabbri became just the second Blues' player to record a hat-trick before the age of 21, joining Bernie Federko.

=== January ===
On January 20, two days after his 25th birthday, the Blues recalled goalie Pheonix Copley from their minor league affiliate Chicago Wolves, to cover Jake Allen's absence as he stayed home for the birth of his daughter. He made his debut (in relief) with the Blues on February 27, 2016. He made his first career start the following day (January 21) against the Winnipeg Jets. He was 11–4–2 with the Chicago Wolves prior to his callup, ranking ninth in the AHL in goals-against average (2.32) and save-percentage (.920). In the January 21 game, Copley, playing almost 59 minutes, gave up five goals on 29 shots, with the Blues losing 5–3. After his one start on January 21, Copley was assigned to the Chicago Wolves on January 25 and Allen returned to the Blues.

=== February ===
Ken Hitchcock was relieved of his duties as head coach by GM Doug Armstrong on February 1, with the Blues sitting in 4th place in the Central Division with 53 points. Mike Yeo was promoted from associate coach. He was scheduled to be head coach next season. Hitchcock had served as the head coach of the Blues since November 8, 2011, leading the Blues to a 248–124–41 regular season record over 5.5 seasons and ranking second on the Blues' all-time regular season wins list and fourth in NHL history overall with 781 career regular season wins. At the time of his firing, Hitchcock, 65, was 781–473–111 (with 88 ties) in 20 seasons with the Dallas Stars, Philadelphia Flyers, Columbus Blue Jackets and Blues. He sat fourth all-time in the NHL in coaching victories, behind Scotty Bowman (1,244), Joel Quenneville (831) and Al Arbour (782), and his 1,453 games coached were fifth. He won the Stanley Cup as coach of the Stars in 1999 and made the Cup Final in 2000, losing to the New Jersey Devils in six games. His teams made the playoffs 13 times in 14 full seasons. Goalie coach Jim Corsi was also relieved of his duties, with Martin Brodeur and Ty Conklin taking over his duties for the rest of the year.

Since the start of the 2011–12 season, when Armstrong hired Hitchcock after 13 games, the Blues had a .644 point percentage. Only the Pittsburgh Penguins (.656) and Chicago Blackhawks (.648) were better. But following a 15-7-4 start in the 2016-17 season, the team sputtered to a 9-14-1 record in the following 24 games, a point percentage of just .395; only the Colorado Avalanche (.196) and Arizona Coyotes (.375) were worse over that stretch. Clinging to the second wild card spot in the Western Conference, in danger of missing the Stanley Cup Playoffs for the first time since 2010–11, Blues' GM Doug Armstrong cited the team's inconsistency in his decision to fire Hitchcock before the end of the season.

The Blues retired Bob Plager's No. 5 uniform in a ceremony on February 2, alongside his brother Barclay's No. 8, Al MacInnis' No. 2, Brett Hull's No. 16, Bernie Federko's No. 24, Bob Gassoff's No. 3, and Brian Sutter's No. 11. His No. 5 became the seventh jersey to be retired by the Blues and the 123rd among the NHL's 30 teams. Bob and Barclay Plager joined only one other pair of brothers to have their jerseys retired by the same team: Maurice "The Rocket" and Henri Richard of the Montreal Canadiens. He joined the club as a 21-year-old in an expansion draft trade with the New York Rangers in 1967 and became an instant fan-favorite thanks to his tenacious style of defense and his famous hip checks. He played 10 seasons in St. Louis, racking up 615 regular season games, 141 points and 762 penalty minutes. Plager retired from the league after the 1977–78 season, and subsequently held many positions with the organization, including head coach, vice president, director of professional scouting, director of player development, and ambassador within the Blues' Community Relations department.

Mike Yeo began his tenure as the 25th head coach in franchise history on February 2. Yeo spent ten seasons with the Pittsburgh Penguins organization and captured the 2009 Stanley Cup as an assistant. He then moved on to Minnesota, where he spent five seasons as head coach and led the Minnesota Wild to three postseason berths, including consecutive trips to the second round in 2014 and 2015.

Robby Fabbri (C) was injured midway through the first period in a February 4 game against the Pittsburgh Penguins, suffering a torn ACL in his left knee. He missed the remainder of the regular season (30 games) and the playoffs. At the time of his injury, Fabbri had recorded 11 goals and 18 assists for 29 points in 51 games played. The Blues recalled forwards Kenny Agostino (LW) and Magnus Paajarvi (LW) from the Chicago Wolves.

Carter Hutton and Jake Allen scored back-to-back shutouts on the road on February 6–7 of the Philadelphia Flyers (2–0), and Ottawa Senators (6–0), respectively. Hutton stopped 26 shots, and Allen stopped 30. Rookie Ivan Barbashev scored his first NHL goal in the waning minutes of the third period in Ottawa.

Patrik Berglund (C) scored the first "hat trick" of his career in a 4-2 win (February 11) over the Montreal Canadiens for their fourth consecutive win for the Blues in a tough five-game road trip, pushing them into the top three in the Central Division's guarantee of a playoff spot with 63 points, three points ahead of the next two teams. David Perron (LW) scored the other goal, and had an assist. Jake Allen made 28 saves on 30 shots.

Jake Allen (G) was named Second Star of the Week on February 13, for the week of February 6-12. Allen, went 3-0-0 with a 1.00 goals-against average, a .967 save percentage and his 13th career shutout against the Ottawa Senators (February 7). His two other wins were against the Toronto Maple Leafs (2-1 OT, 31 saves, February 9), and Montreal Canadiens (February 11).

On February 17, the Blues activated Kyle Brodziak (C) two weeks ahead of schedule. He suffered a right foot injury on January 24, against the Pittsburgh Penguins, and was placed on injured reserve two days later. He was expected to miss five weeks, but missed three weeks and 10 games. Wade Megan (C) was reassigned to the Chicago Wolves.

Paul Stastny (C) returned to the lineup on February 20, after missing four games with a lower-body injury against the Toronto Maple Leafs on February 9.

=== March ===
The Blues clinched a playoff spot on March 31, in a 2-1 shootout loss to the Colorado Avalanche at the Pepsi Center. The Blues (42-28-7) needed one point to qualify for their sixth consecutive trip to the postseason and 41st in their 50-year history. This marked the Blues' seventh playoff appearance in a span of 12 seasons. The club had previously reached the playoffs in 25 consecutive years between 1979 and 2004. They joined the Chicago Blackhawks, Pittsburgh Penguins and New York Rangers as the only teams to have reached the playoffs in each of the previous six seasons.

=== April ===
On April 8, the Blues clinched third place in the Central Division with a 5-4 shootout win over the Carolina Hurricanes in Raleigh. They had an 8-0-3 record in their final 11 games to finish the season with 99 points, 5 ahead of the fourth-place Nashville Predators.

The Blues (46-29-7; 99 pts., 235-218 GF–GA) played the second-place Minnesota Wild (49-25-8; 106 pts., 266-208 GF–GA) in the Western Conference First Round of the Stanley Cup Playoffs, which began on Wednesday, April 12 with the first two games in St. Paul.

Game 1 (Apr. 12) went to the Blues in a remarkable 51-save effort by goalie Jake Allen. The 51-saves were the fourth-most ever by a Blues goaltender in a playoff game, helping the Blues to a dramatic 2-1 overtime victory against Minnesota. Only Curtis Joseph (61 saves and 57 saves), and Ed Staniowski (54 saves) have posted more. Defenseman Joel Edmundson scored the winner in overtime. Recently acquired (C) Vladimir Sobotka gave the Blues a 1-0 lead at 6:21 of the second period. Sobotka played in his first playoff game with the Blues since 2014, after spending the three seasons in the Kontinental Hockey League. Zach Parise of the Wild ended Allen's 1-0 shutout bid when he scored with 22 seconds remaining in the third period, forcing the overtime frame. Edmundson scored the winner at 17:48 of the overtime.

Paul Stastny (C) was activated before the fifth game on April 22, after missing 14 games; 10 in the regular season and the first 4 in the playoffs against the Wild. He scored the Blues' third goal in the third period, giving the team a 3-1 lead. Magnus Paajarvi (LW) won the series with an overtime goal at 9:42. Jake Allen saved 34 of 37 shots in the 4-3 win.

In the Western Conference second-round series, the Blues were matched up against the Nashville Predators (41-29-12; 94 pts., 240-224 GF–GA), who swept the Chicago Blackhawks in their first-round series. As the higher seed, the Blues had home-ice advantage for the series. Nashville won the series opener 4-3, almost blowing a 3-1 second-period lead but pulling out the victory behind P.K. Subban's three-point game and Vernon Fiddler's game-winning goal late in the third period. The Blues tied the series with a 3-2 win in Game 2, handing Nashville their first loss of the 2017 playoffs, but the Predators won the subsequent two games to take a commanding 3-1 series lead.

On April 23, the Blues assigned Jordan Schmaltz (D) to the Chicago Wolves, and recalled prospect Thomas Vannelli (D), 22, who was acquired in the 2013 NHL entry draft #47 in round 2.

=== May ===
The Blues lost their second-round playoff series to Nashville, 4 games to 2, with Nashville clinching the series in a 3-1 Game 6 victory on home ice behind Pekka Rinne's 23-save effort and Ryan Johansen's game-winning goal. After a 33-20-5 regular season with a .915 save percentage and 2.42 GAA, Jake Allen finished his playoffs 6-5 with a .935 save percentage and 1.96 GAA. Regular-season team points leaders Vladimir Tarasenko (75 pts in 82 games), Jaden Schwartz (55 pts in 78 games), and Alexander Steen (51 pts in 76 games) scored a combined 22 points over the team's 11 playoff games, though they tallied just 5 combined points after Game 2 against Nashville as the Blues were held to 5 goals over the final 4 games of their series loss. After a 12-1-1 record in road games after Mike Yeo replaced Ken Hitchcock as head coach, including 3 road wins in the first-round series win over Minnesota, the Blues lost all three games in Nashville, held to a single goal in each loss.

== Standings ==
Central Division
Pos	Team	GP	W	L	OTL	ROW	GF	GA	GD	Pts
1	z – Chicago Blackhawks	82	50	23	9	46	244	213	+31	109
2	x – Minnesota Wild	82	49	25	8	46	266	208	+58	106
3	x – St. Louis Blues	82	46	29	7	44	235	218	+17	99
4	x – Nashville Predators	82	41	29	12	39	240	224	+16	94
5	Winnipeg Jets	82	40	35	7	37	249	256	−7	87
6	Dallas Stars	82	34	37	11	33	223	262	−39	79
7	Colorado Avalanche	82	22	56	4	21	166	278	−112	48

Source: National Hockey League
x – Clinched playoff spot; z – Clinched conference

== Schedule and results ==
=== Pre-season ===
2016 Pre-season Game Log: 4–3–1 (Home: 3–1–0; Road: 1–2–1)
#	Date	Visitor	Score	Home	OT	Decision	Attendance	Record	Recap
1^{[A]}	September 25	Columbus	3–7	St. Louis		Hutton	10,394	1–0–0	Recap
2^{[A]}	September 25	St. Louis	5–0	Columbus		Binnington	8,574	2–0–0	Recap
3	September 26	St. Louis	1–3	Dallas		Hutton	—	2–1–0	Recap
4	September 30	Dallas	1–4	St. Louis		Allen	13,239	3–1–0	Recap
5	October 1	St. Louis	0–4	Chicago		Hutton	20,831	3–2–0	Recap
6	October 3	St. Louis	1–2	Washington	SO	Hutton	14,829	3–2–1	Recap
7	October 5	Washington	4–2	St. Louis		—	—	3–3–1	Recap
8	October 8	Chicago	1–2	St. Louis		Hutton	17,346	4–3–1	Recap
^{A} – indicates split-squad game.

=== Regular season ===
2016–17 Game Log

October: 5–2–2 (Home: 3–1–1; Road: 2–1–1)
#	Date	Visitor	Score	Home	OT	Decision	Attendance	Record	Pts	Recap
1	October 12	St. Louis	5–2	Chicago		Allen	21,729	1–0–0	2	Recap
2	October 13	Minnesota	2–3	St. Louis		Allen	19,673	2–0–0	4	Recap
3	October 15	NY Rangers	2–3	St. Louis		Hutton	19,197	3–0–0	6	Recap
4	October 18	St. Louis	1–2	Vancouver	OT	Allen	17,568	3–0–1	7	Recap
5	October 20	St. Louis	1–3	Edmonton		Allen	18,347	3–1–1	7	Recap
6	October 22	St. Louis	6–4	Calgary		Allen	18,076	4–1–1	9	Recap
7	October 25	Calgary	4–1	St. Louis		Hutton	17,337	4–2–1	9	Recap
8	October 27	Detroit	2–1	St. Louis	SO	Allen	19,229	4–2–2	10	Recap
9	October 29	Los Angeles	0–1	St. Louis		Allen	18,631	5–2–2	12	Recap

November: 8–5–1 (Home: 7–0–1; Road: 1–5–0)
#	Date	Visitor	Score	Home	OT	Decision	Attendance	Record	Pts	Recap
10	November 1	St. Louis	0–5	NY Rangers		Allen	18,006	5–3–2	12	Recap
11	November 3	St. Louis	2–6	Dallas		Allen	18,532	5–4–2	12	Recap
12	November 5	Columbus	1–2	St. Louis	OT	Hutton	18,245	6–4–2	14	Recap
13	November 6	Colorado	1–5	St. Louis		Allen	17,220	7–4–2	16	Recap
14	November 9	Chicago	2–1	St. Louis	OT	Allen	18,704	7–4–3	17	Recap
15	November 10	St. Louis	1–3	Nashville		Hutton	17,259	7–5–3	17	Recap
16	November 12	St. Louis	4–8	Columbus		Hutton	15,788	7–6–3	17	Recap
17	November 15	Buffalo	1–4	St. Louis		Allen	16,884	8–6–3	19	Recap
18	November 17	San Jose	2–3	St. Louis		Allen	17,618	9–6–3	21	Recap
19	November 19	Nashville	1–3	St. Louis		Allen	18,922	10–6–3	23	Recap
20	November 22	St. Louis	4–2	Boston		Allen	17,565	11–6–3	25	Recap
21	November 23	St. Louis	3–4	Washington		Hutton	18,506	11–7–3	25	Recap
22	November 26	Minnesota	3–4	St. Louis	SO	Allen	19,396	12–7–3	27	Recap
23	November 28	Dallas	3–4	St. Louis	OT	Allen	17,169	13–7–3	29	Recap

December: 6–6–2 (Home: 4–2–2; Road: 2–4–0)
#	Date	Visitor	Score	Home	OT	Decision	Attendance	Record	Pts	Recap
24	December 1	Tampa Bay	4–5	St. Louis		Allen	17,351	14–7–3	31	Recap
25	December 3	Winnipeg	3–2	St. Louis	OT	Hutton	19,362	14–7–4	32	Recap
26	December 6	Montreal	2–3	St. Louis	OT	Allen	17,646	15–7–4	34	Recap
27	December 8	St. Louis	2–3	NY Islanders		Allen	11,178	15–8–4	34	Recap
28	December 9	St. Louis	4–1	New Jersey		Allen	16,514	16–8–4	36	Recap
29	December 11	St. Louis	1–3	Minnesota		Allen	18,363	16–9–4	36	Recap
30	December 13	St. Louis	3–6	Nashville		Allen	17,113	16–10–4	36	Recap
31	December 15	New Jersey	2–5	St. Louis		Allen	18,347	17–10–4	38	Recap
32	December 17	Chicago	6–4	St. Louis		Allen	19,197	17–11–4	38	Recap
33	December 19	Edmonton	3–2	St. Louis	OT	Hutton	19,357	17–11–5	39	Recap
34	December 20	St. Louis	3–2	Dallas	OT	Allen	18,532	18–11–5	41	Recap
35	December 22	St. Louis	2–5	Tampa Bay		Allen	19,092	18–12–5	41	Recap
36	December 28	Philadelphia	3–6	St. Louis		Hutton	19,409	19–12–5	43	Recap
37	December 30	Nashville	4–0	St. Louis		Allen	19,483	19–13–5	43	Recap

January: 5–8–0 (Home: 2–5–0; Road: 3–3–0)
#	Date	Visitor	Score	Home	OT	Decision	Attendance	Record	Pts	Recap
38	January 2	Chicago	1–4	St. Louis		Allen	46,556 (outdoors)	20–13–5	45	Recap
39	January 5	Carolina	4–2	St. Louis		Allen	19,090	20–14–5	45	Recap
40	January 7	Dallas	3–4	St. Louis		Hutton	19,503	21–14–5	47	Recap
41	January 10	Boston	5–3	St. Louis		Hutton	19,342	21–15–5	47	Recap
42	January 12	St. Louis	1–5	Los Angeles		Allen	18,230	21–16–5	47	Recap
43	January 14	St. Louis	4–0	San Jose		Hutton	17,562	22–16–5	49	Recap
44	January 15	St. Louis	2–1	Anaheim	OT	Hutton	17,174	23–16–5	51	Recap
45	January 17	Ottawa	6–4	St. Louis		Hutton	18,922	23–17–5	51	Recap
46	January 19	Washington	7–3	St. Louis		Allen	19,316	23–18–5	51	Recap
47	January 21	St. Louis	3–5	Winnipeg		Copley	15,294	23–19–5	51	Recap
48	January 24	St. Louis	3–0	Pittsburgh		Hutton	18,563	24–19–5	53	Recap
49	January 26	St. Louis	1–5	Minnesota		Hutton	19,064	24–20–5	53	Recap
January 27–29		All-Star Break in Los Angeles
50	January 31	Winnipeg	5–3	St. Louis		Allen	19,483	24–21–5	53	Recap

February: 7–5–0 (Home: 2–3–0; Road: 5–2–0)
#	Date	Visitor	Score	Home	OT	Decision	Attendance	Record	Pts	Recap
51	February 2	Toronto	1–5	St. Louis		Allen	19,258	25–21–5	55	Recap
52	February 4	Pittsburgh	4–1	St. Louis		Allen	19,496	25–22–5	55	Recap
53	February 6	St. Louis	2–0	Philadelphia		Hutton	19,589	26–22–5	57	Recap
54	February 7	St. Louis	6–0	Ottawa		Allen	16,787	27–22–5	59	Recap
55	February 9	St. Louis	2–1	Toronto	OT	Allen	18,920	28–22–5	61	Recap
56	February 11	St. Louis	4–2	Montreal		Allen	21,288	29–22–5	63	Recap
57	February 15	St. Louis	2–0	Detroit		Hutton	20,027	30–22–5	65	Recap
58	February 16	Vancouver	3–4	St. Louis		Allen	19,291	31–22–5	67	Recap
59	February 18	St. Louis	2–3	Buffalo		Allen	19,070	31–23–5	67	Recap
60	February 20	Florida	2–1	St. Louis		Allen	19,239	31–24–5	67	Recap
61	February 26	St. Louis	2–4	Chicago		Allen	21,961	31–25–5	67	Recap
62	February 28	Edmonton	2–1	St. Louis		Allen	18,944	31–26–5	67	Recap

March: 11–2–2 (Home: 4–0–1; Road: 7–2–1)
#	Date	Visitor	Score	Home	OT	Decision	Attendance	Record	Pts	Recap
63	March 3	St. Louis	0–3	Winnipeg		Hutton	15,294	31–27–5	67	Recap
64	March 5	St. Louis	3–0	Colorado		Allen	14,477	32–27–5	69	Recap
65	March 7	St. Louis	2–1	Minnesota		Allen	19,124	33–27–5	71	Recap
66	March 10	Anaheim	3–4	St. Louis		Allen	19,358	34–27–5	73	Recap
67	March 11	NY Islanders	3–4	St. Louis		Hutton	19,505	35–27–5	75	Recap
68	March 13	St. Louis	3–1	Los Angeles		Allen	18,230	36–27–5	77	Recap
69	March 15	St. Louis	1–2	Anaheim		Allen	14,760	36–28–5	77	Recap
70	March 16	St. Louis	4–1	San Jose		Hutton	17,402	37–28–5	79	Recap
71	March 18	St. Louis	3–0	Arizona		Allen	15,132	38–28–5	81	Recap
72	March 21	St. Louis	4–2	Colorado		Allen	11,687	39–28–5	83	Recap
73	March 23	Vancouver	1–4	St. Louis		Allen	19,356	40–28–5	85	Recap
74	March 25	Calgary	3–2	St. Louis	OT	Allen	19,516	40–28–6	86	Recap
75	March 27	Arizona	1–4	St. Louis		Allen	19,164	41–28–6	88	Recap
76	March 29	St. Louis	3–1	Arizona		Hutton	11,377	42–28–6	90	Recap
77	March 31	St. Louis	1–2	Colorado	SO	Allen	14,763	42–28–7	91	Recap

April: 4–1–0 (Home: 2–1–0; Road: 2–0–0)
#	Date	Visitor	Score	Home	OT	Decision	Attendance	Record	Pts	Recap
78	April 2	Nashville	1–4	St. Louis		Allen	19,262	43–28–7	93	Recap
79	April 4	Winnipeg	5–2	St. Louis		Allen	19,178	43–29–7	93	Recap
80	April 6	St. Louis	6–3	Florida		Allen	13,194	44–29–7	95	Recap
81	April 8	St. Louis	5–4	Carolina	SO	Hutton	13,509	45–29–7	97	Recap
82	April 9	Colorado	2–3	St. Louis		Allen	18,971	46–29–7	99	Recap

Legend: Win (2 points) Loss (0 points) Overtime/shootout loss (1 point)

=== Playoffs ===
2017 Stanley Cup playoffs

Western Conference First Round vs. (C2) Minnesota Wild: Blues won 4–1
#	Date	Visitor	Score	Home	OT	Decision	Attendance	Series	Recap
1	April 12	St. Louis	2–1	Minnesota	OT	Allen	19,168	1–0	Recap
2	April 14	St. Louis	2–1	Minnesota		Allen	19,404	2–0	Recap
3	April 16	Minnesota	1–3	St. Louis		Allen	19,334	3–0	Recap
4	April 19	Minnesota	2–0	St. Louis		Allen	19,791	3–1	Recap
5	April 22	St. Louis	4–3	Minnesota	OT	Allen	19,228	4–1	Recap

Western Conference Second Round vs. (WC2) Nashville Predators: Predators won 4–2
#	Date	Visitor	Score	Home	OT	Decision	Attendance	Series	Recap
1	April 26	Nashville	4–3	St. Louis		Allen	19,154	0–1	Recap
2	April 28	Nashville	2–3	St. Louis		Allen	19,506	1–1	Recap
3	April 30	St. Louis	1–3	Nashville		Allen	17,220	1–2	Recap
4	May 2	St. Louis	1–2	Nashville		Allen	17,273	1–3	Recap
5	May 5	Nashville	1–2	St. Louis		Allen	19,168	2–3	Recap
6	May 7	St. Louis	1–3	Nashville		Allen	17,240	2–4	Recap

Legend: Win Loss

== Player statistics ==
Statistics

=== Skaters ===
Final as of April 9, 2017

^{†}Denotes player spent time with another team before joining the Blues. Stats reflect time with the Blues only.
^{‡}Denotes player was traded mid-season. Stats reflect time with the Blues only.

Regular season
Player	GP	G	A	Pts	+/−	PIM
Vladimir Tarasenko	82	39	36	75	−1	12
Jaden Schwartz	78	19	36	55	14	18
Alexander Steen	76	16	35	51	−2	53
Alex Pietrangelo	80	14	34	48	3	24
David Perron	82	18	28	46	−2	54
Kevin Shattenkirk^{‡} ( -2/27)	61	11	31	42	−11	37
Paul Stastny	66	18	22	40	4	36
Colton Parayko	81	4	31	35	7	32
Patrik Berglund	82	23	11	34	−7	32
Robby Fabbri ( -2/4)	51	11	18	29	−16	27
Jori Lehtera	63	7	14	21	−6	34
Scottie Upshall	73	10	8	18	−1	45
Kyle Brodziak	69	8	7	15	2	27
Joel Edmundson	69	3	12	15	11	60
Jay Bouwmeester	81	1	14	15	6	28
Magnus Paajarvi	32	8	5	13	9	6
Ryan Reaves	80	7	6	13	4	104
Ivan Barbashev	30	5	7	12	5	2
Dmitrij Jaskin	51	1	10	11	5	18
Nail Yakupov	40	3	6	9	−3	14
Carl Gunnarsson	56	0	6	6	−5	4
Zach Sanford	13	2	3	5	2	4
Brad Hunt^{‡} ( -1/16)	9	1	4	5	−2	2
Robert Bortuzzo	38	1	3	4	11	15
Kenny Agostino	7	1	2	3	0	2
Jordan Schmaltz	9	0	2	2	0	4
Wade Megan	3	1	0	1	1	0
Vladimir Sobotka (4/9- )	1	1	0	1	0	0
Petteri Lindbohm	5	0	0	0	−3	4
Ty Rattie^{‡} ( -1/4)	4	0	0	0	0	0

=== Goaltenders ===
Final game on April 9, 2017

Regular season
Player	GP	GS	TOI	W	L	OT	GA	GAA	SA	SV%	SO	G	A	PIM
Jake Allen	61	60	3,418:19	33	20	5	138	2.42	1,620	.915	4	0	1	4
Carter Hutton	30	21	1,459:03	13	8	2	58	2.39	663	.913	4	0	1	4
Pheonix Copley^{‡} ( -2/27)	1	1	58:56	0	1	0	5	5.08	29	.828	0	0	0	0

^{†}Denotes player spent time with another team before joining the Blues. Stats reflect time with the Blues only.
^{‡}Denotes player was traded mid-season. Stats reflect time with the Team only.

==== Playoffs ====
Final game on May 7

Playoffs
Player	GP	GS	TOI	W	L	GA	GAA	SA	SV%	SO	G	A	PIM
Jake Allen	11	11	674:56	6	5	22	1.96	336	.935	0	0	0	0
Carter Hutton	0	0	00:00	0	0	0	0.00	0	.000	0	0	0	0

== Awards and Milestones ==
=== Awards ===
Regular season
Player	Award	Awarded
V. Tarasenko	NHL All-Star game (1st Blue to appear in 3 consecutive games since Chris Pronger in 2000–2002)	January 10, 2017
B. Plager	#5 Jersey retirement ceremony (7th Blue to have jersey retired)	February 2, 2017
J. Allen	NHL Second Star of the Week	February 13, 2017

=== Milestones ===
Regular season
Player	Milestone	Reached
R. Fabbri	1st NHL hat-trick	December 28, 2016
A. Pietrangelo	500th NHL game	January 12, 2017
P. Copley	1st NHL start in goal	January 21, 2017
I. Barbashev	1st NHL game	January 26, 2017
I. Barbashev	1st NHL goal	February 7, 2017
P. Berglund	1st NHL hat-trick	February 11, 2017
A. Steen	800th NHL game	February 20, 2017
R. Reaves	400th NHL game	March 3, 2017
J. Schmaltz	1st NHL game	March 5, 2017
J. Schmaltz	1st NHL point	March 31, 2017

== Detailed records ==
Western Conference
Central Division
Opponent	Home	Away	Total	Pts.	Goals scored	Goals allowed
Chicago Blackhawks	1–1–1	1–0–0	2–1–1	5	14	11
Colorado Avalanche	1–0–0	0–0–0	1–0–0	2	5	1
Dallas Stars	3–0–0	0–1–0	3–1–0	6	13	14
Minnesota Wild	2–0–0	0–1–0	2–1–0	4	8	8
Nashville Predators	1–1–0	0–2–0	1–3–0	2	7	14
Winnipeg Jets	0–0–1	0–0–0	0–0–1	1	2	2
Total	8–2–2	1–4–0	9–6–2	20	49	50
Pacific Division
Opponent	Home	Away	Total	Pts.	Goals scored	Goals allowed
Anaheim Ducks	0–0–0	1–0–0	1–0–0	2	2	1
Arizona Coyotes	0–0–0	0–0–0	0–0–0	0	0	0
Calgary Flames	0–1–0	1–0–0	1–1–0	2	7	8
Edmonton Oilers	0–1–1	0–0–0	0–1–1	1	3	5
Los Angeles Kings	1–0–0	0–0–0	1–0–0	2	1	0
San Jose Sharks	1–0–0	0–0–0	1–0–0	2	3	2
Vancouver Canucks	1–0–0	0–0–1	0–0–1	1	5	5
Total	3–2–1	3–0–1	5–2–2	12	21	21

Eastern Conference
Atlantic Division
Opponent	Home	Away	Total	Pts.	Goals scored	Goals allowed
Boston Bruins	0–0–0	1–0–0	1–0–0	2	4	2
Buffalo Sabres	1–0–0	0–0–0	1–0–0	2	4	1
Detroit Red Wings	0–0–1	0–0–0	0–0–1	1	1	1
Florida Panthers	0–0–0	0–0–0	0–0–0	0	0	0
Montreal Canadiens	1–0–0	1–0–0	2–0–0	4	7	4
Ottawa Senators	0–1–0	1–0–0	1–1–0	2	10	4
Tampa Bay Lightning	1–0–0	0–1–0	1–1–0	2	7	9
Toronto Maple Leafs	1–0–0	1–0–0	2–0–0	4	7	2
Total	3–0–1	1–1–0	4–1–1	9	19	15
Metropolitan Division
Opponent	Home	Away	Total	Pts.	Goals scored	Goals allowed
Carolina Hurricanes	0–1–0	0–0–0	0–1–0	0	2	4
Columbus Blue Jackets	1–0–0	0–1–0	1–1–0	2	6	9
New Jersey Devils	1–0–0	1–0–0	2–0–0	4	9	3
New York Islanders	0–0–0	0–1–0	0–1–0	0	2	3
New York Rangers	1–0–0	0–1–0	1–1–0	2	3	7
Philadelphia Flyers	1–0–0	0–0–0	1–0–0	2	6	3
Pittsburgh Penguins	0–0–0	0–0–0	0–0–0	0	0	0
Washington Capitals	0–1–0	0–1–0	0–2–0	0	6	11
Total	4–2–0	1–4–0	5–6–0	10	34	40

== Transactions ==
The Blues has been involved in the following transactions:

=== Trades ===
Date	Details		Ref
June 24, 2016	To Calgary Flames Brian Elliott	To St. Louis Blues 2nd-round pick in 2016; Conditional 3rd-round pick in 2018
June 24, 2016	To Washington Capitals 1st-round pick in 2016; WSH's 3rd-round pick in 2016	To St. Louis Blues 1st-round pick in 2016
June 25, 2016	To Chicago Blackhawks 5th-round pick in 2017	To St. Louis Blues Florida Panthers's 5th-round pick in 2016
July 2, 2016	To Buffalo Sabres Anders Nilsson	To St. Louis Blues 5th-round pick in 2017
October 7, 2016	To Edmonton Oilers Zach Pochiro; Conditional 3rd-round pick in 2017	To St. Louis Blues Nail Yakupov
November 19, 2016	To Pittsburgh Penguins Danny Kristo	To St. Louis Blues Reid McNeill
February 27, 2017	To Washington Capitals Pheonix Copley; Kevin Shattenkirk	To St. Louis Blues Brad Malone; Zach Sanford; 1st-round pick in 2017; Conditional 2nd-round pick in 2019

=== Free agents acquired ===
Date	Player	Former team	Contract terms (in U.S. dollars)	Ref
July 1, 2016	Carter Hutton (G)	Nashville Predators	2 years, $2.25 million	
July 1, 2016	David Perron (LW)	Anaheim Ducks	2 years, $7.5 million	
July 2, 2016	Brad Hunt (D)	Edmonton Oilers	1 year, $600,000	
July 2, 2016	Andrew Agozzino (LW)	Colorado Avalanche	1 year, $600,000	
July 2, 2016	Wade Megan (C)	Portland Pirates	1 year, $575,000	
July 2, 2016	Morgan Ellis (D)	St. John's IceCaps	1 year, $575,000	
July 2, 2016	Alex Friesen (C)	Utica Comets	1 year, $575,000	
July 2, 2016	Kenny Agostino (LW)	Stockton Heat	1 year, $625,000	
July 9, 2016	Landon Ferraro (C)	Boston Bruins	1 year, $700,000	

=== Free agents lost ===
Date	Player	New team	Contract terms (in U.S. dollars)	Ref
July 1, 2016	David Backes (C)	Boston Bruins	5 years, $30 mil.	
July 1, 2016	Troy Brouwer (RW)	Calgary Flames	4 years, $18 mil.	
July 1, 2016	Steve Ott (C)	Detroit Red Wings	1 year, $800,000	

=== Claimed via waivers ===
Player	Former team	Date Claimed	Ref
Ty Rattie	Carolina Hurricanes	February 19, 2017	

=== Lost via waivers ===
Player	New team	Date Lost	Ref
Ty Rattie	Carolina Hurricanes	January 4, 2017	
Brad Hunt	Nashville Predators	January 17, 2017	

=== Lost via retirement ===
Date	Player	Ref

=== Player signings ===
Date	Player	Contract terms (in U.S. dollars)	Ref
June 16, 2016	Dmitrij Jaskin (RW)	2 years, $2 million	
June 22, 2016	Scottie Upshall (RW)	1 year, $900,000	
June 27, 2016	Kyle Brodziak (C)	2 years, $1.9 mil.	
June 28, 2016	Jordan Caron (RW)	1 year, $575,000	
July 1, 2016	Jake Allen (G)	4 years, $17.4 mil.	
July 2, 2016	Chris Butler (D)	1 year, $600,000	
July 2, 2016	Conner Bleackley (C)	3 years, entry-level contract	
July 2, 2016	Jacob Doty (C)	1 year, $575,000	
July 5, 2016	Magnus Paajarvi (LW)	1 year, $700,000	
July 13, 2016	Ty Rattie (RW)	1 year, $650,000	
July 15, 2016	Jordan Binnington (G)	1 year, $600,000	
July 15, 2016	Pheonix Copley (G)	1 year, $708,750	
July 15, 2016	Jaden Schwartz (LW)	5 years, $26.75 million	
July 27, 2016	Jordan Kyrou (F)	3 years, $2.775 million entry-level contract	
August 2, 2016	Danny Kristo (RW)	1 year, $575,000	
September 23, 2016	Alexander Steen (LW)	4 years, $23 million contract extension	
December 29, 2016	Robert Bortuzzo (D)	2 years, contract extension	
February 24, 2017	Patrik Berglund (C)	5 years, $19.25 million contract extension	
March 7, 2017	Tage Thompson (C)	3 years, entry-level contract	
March 26, 2017	Evan Fitzpatrick (G)	3 years, entry-level contract	
March 28, 2017	Jake Walman (D)	3 years, entry-level contract	
April 6, 2017	Vladimir Sobotka (C)	3 years, $10.5 million contract extension (starting with the 2017–18 season; $2.725 million, pro-rated for 2016-17 season)	

== Draft picks ==
Below are the St. Louis Blues' selections at the 2016 NHL entry draft, to be held on June 24–25, 2016 at the First Niagara Center in Buffalo.

Round	Pick	Player, Age	Pos	Nationality	College/Junior/Club team (League)	Ref.
1	26	Tage Thompson, 18	C	United States	University of Connecticut Huskies (Hockey East)	
2	35^{[a]}	Jordan Kyrou, 18	RW	Canada	Sarnia Sting (OHL)	
2	59	Evan Fitzpatrick, 18	G	Canada	Sherbrooke Phoenix (QMJHL)	
4	119	Tanner Kaspick, 18	C	Canada	Brandon Wheat Kings (WHL)	
5	125^{[b]}	Nolan Stevens, 19	C	Canada	Northeastern University (Hockey East)	
5	144^{[c]}	Conner Bleackley, 20	C	Canada	Red Deer Rebels (WHL)	
7	209	Nikolaj Krag Christensen, 17	LW / C	Denmark	Rodovre (Metal Ligaen)	
7	211^{[d]}	Filip Helt, 18	LW	Czech Republic	Litvinov Jr., (CZREP-JR)	

"NHL Draft Picks Tracker: First-round analysis from First Niagara Center in Buffalo"

26. St. Louis Blues (from Washington Capitals) - Tage Thompson, C, Connecticut (H-EAST) NHL Central Scouting final North American ranking: 20

2015-16: 36 games, 14-18-32

"A right-handed power forward, Thompson began the season on the fourth line but soon was playing top line minutes. He has a great shot and led the NCAA with 13 power-play goals. Thompson (6-5, 195) is tough to knock off the puck, and good at protecting it and taking it to the net.

NHL.com quick hit: The Blues needed a big, strong center and Thompson, at 6-foot-5 and 195 pounds, has a giant frame that can get even bigger. With David Backes' future in St. Louis uncertain and Paul Stastny turning 31 next season, the time was right for the Blues to start to search for a future No. 1 center."

--

Draft notes

- The Washington Capitals' first-round pick went to the St. Louis Blues as the result of a trade on June 24, 2016 that sent a first-round pick and Washington's third-round pick both in 2016 (28th and 87th overall) to Washington, in exchange for this pick.
- The St. Louis Blues' first-round pick went to the Washington Capitals as the result of a trade on June 24, 2016 that sent a first-round pick in 2016 (26th overall) to St. Louis, in exchange for Washington's third-round pick in 2016 (87th overall), and this pick.
- ^{a} The Calgary Flames' second-round pick went to the St. Louis Blues as the result of a trade on June 24, 2016 that sent Brian Elliott to Calgary, in exchange for a third-round pick in 2018, and this pick.
- The Washington Capitals' third-round pick was re-acquired as the result of a trade on June 24, 2016 that sent a first-round pick in 2016 (26th overall) to St. Louis, in exchange for a first-round pick in 2016 (28th overall), and this pick.

St. Louis previously acquired this pick as the result of a trade on July 2, 2015 that sent T.J. Oshie to Washington, in exchange for Troy Brouwer, Pheonix Copley, and this pick.

- The St. Louis Blues' third-round pick will go to the Buffalo Sabres as the result of a trade on February 28, 2014 that sent Ryan Miller, Steve Ott and conditional second and third-round picks in 2014 to St. Louis, in exchange for Jaroslav Halak, Chris Stewart, William Carrier, a first-round pick in 2015, and this pick (being conditional at the time of the trade). The condition – Buffalo will receive a third-round pick in 2016 if Miller does not re-sign with St. Louis for the 2014–15 NHL season – was converted on July 1, 2014 when Miller signed with Vancouver.
- ^{b} The Columbus Blue Jackets' fifth-round pick will go to the St. Louis Blues as the result of a trade on November 15, 2014 that sent Jordan Leopold to Columbus, in exchange for this pick.
- The St. Louis Blues' fifth-round pick will go to the Edmonton Oilers as the result of a trade on February 27, 2016 that sent Anders Nilsson to St. Louis, in exchange for Niklas Lundstrom, and this pick.
- ^{c} The Florida Panthers' fifth-round pick will go to the Chicago Blackhawks (then to the St. Louis Blues), as the result of a trade on March 2, 2014 that sent Brandon Pirri to Florida, in exchange for a third-round pick in 2014, and this pick.
- The St. Louis Blues' sixth-round pick will go to the Toronto Maple Leafs as the result of a trade March 2, 2015 that sent Olli Jokinen to St. Louis, in exchange for Joakim Lindstrom, and this pick (being conditional at the time of the trade). The condition – Toronto will receive a sixth-round pick in 2016 if St. Louis fails to make it to the 2015 Stanley Cup Finals – was converted on April 26, 2015.
- ^{d} The Pittsburgh Penguins' seventh-round pick will go to the St. Louis Blues as the result of a trade on March 2, 2015 that sent Ian Cole to Pittsburgh, in exchange for Robert Bortuzzo, and this pick.
