= 2016–17 Edmonton Oilers season =

NHL team season

2016–17 Edmonton Oilers
- Division: 2nd Pacific
- Conference: 4th Western
- 2016–17 record: 47–26–9
- Home record: 25–12–4
- Road record: 22–14–5
- Goals for: 247
- Goals against: 212

Team information
- General manager: Peter Chiarelli
- Coach: Todd McLellan
- Captain: Connor McDavid
- Alternate captains: Jordan Eberle; Milan Lucic; Ryan Nugent-Hopkins
- Arena: Rogers Place
- Average attendance: 18,369
- Minor league affiliates: Bakersfield Condors (AHL); Norfolk Admirals (ECHL)

Team leaders
- Goals: Connor McDavid (30)
- Assists: Connor McDavid (70)
- Points: Connor McDavid (100)
- Penalty minutes: Zack Kassian (101)
- Plus/minus: Connor McDavid (+27)
- Wins: Cam Talbot (42)
- Goals against average: Laurent Brossoit (1.99)

The 2016–17 Edmonton Oilers season was the 38th season for the National Hockey League (NHL) franchise that was established on June 22, 1979, and 45th season including their play in the World Hockey Association (WHA). This was the Oilers' first season of play at their new downtown arena, Rogers Place. This season also marked the end of their 11-year playoff drought after they clinched the playoffs on March 28 against the Los Angeles Kings for their first playoff appearance since 2006. This season marked the first time since the 1986–87 season that the Oilers recorded 100 points in a season.

== Regular season ==
The Oilers were better than the last several seasons and were compared with the 1980s dynasty. They started with a 7-2-0 record in October.

== Standings ==
Pacific Division
Pos	Team	GP	W	L	OTL	ROW	GF	GA	GD	Pts
1	y – Anaheim Ducks	82	46	23	13	43	223	200	+23	105
2	x – Edmonton Oilers	82	47	26	9	43	247	212	+35	103
3	x – San Jose Sharks	82	46	29	7	44	221	201	+20	99
4	x – Calgary Flames	82	45	33	4	41	226	221	+5	94
5	Los Angeles Kings	82	39	35	8	37	201	205	−4	86
6	Arizona Coyotes	82	30	42	10	24	197	260	−63	70
7	Vancouver Canucks	82	30	43	9	26	182	243	−61	69

Source: National Hockey League
x – Clinched playoff spot; y – Clinched division

== Schedule and results ==
=== Pre-season ===
2016 pre-season game log

Rookie games: 4–0–0
#	Date	Visitor	Score	Home	OT	Decision	Attendance	Record	Recap
1^{[a]}	September 16	Vancouver Rookies	1–4	Edmonton Rookies		Ellis	4,192	1–0–0	Recap
2^{[a]}	September 17	Calgary Rookies	3–4	Edmonton Rookies	OT	Wells	4,075	2–0–0	Recap
3^{[a]}	September 19	Edmonton Rookies	4–1	Winnipeg Rookies		Bouchard	2,789	3–0–0	Recap
4^{[b]}	September 21	University of Alberta	3–6	Edmonton Rookies		Ellis	5,125	4–0–0	Recap
^{[a]}Rookie Tournament at South Okanagan Events Centre in Penticton, British Columbia^{[b]}Game played at Clare Drake Arena in Edmonton

September/October: 5–3–0 (Home: 4–1–0; Road: 1–2–0)
#	Date	Visitor	Score	Home	OT	Decision	Attendance	Record	Recap
1^{[A]}	September 26	Calgary	2–4	Edmonton		Laurikainen	18,500	1–0–0	Recap
2^{[A]}	September 26	Edmonton	2–1	Calgary		Gustavsson	18,114	2–0–0	Recap
3	September 28	Edmonton	3–5	Vancouver		Ellis	17,058	2–1–0	Recap
4	September 30	Edmonton	1–5	Winnipeg		Talbot	15,294	2–2–0	Recap
5	October 2	Los Angeles	2–3	Edmonton		Brossoit	4,272	3–2–0	Recap
6	October 4	Anaheim	1–2	Edmonton		Talbot	18,500	4–2–0	Recap
7	October 6	Winnipeg	2–5	Edmonton		Gustavsson	18,500	5–2–0	Recap
8	October 8	Vancouver	3–2	Edmonton		Talbot	18,500	5–3–0	Recap
^{A} – indicates split-squad game.

=== Regular season ===
2016–17 game log

October: 7–2–0 (Home: 4–2–0; Road: 3–0–0)
#	Date	Visitor	Score	Home	OT	Decision	Attendance	Record	Pts	Recap
1	October 12	Calgary	4–7	Edmonton		Talbot	18,347	1–0–0	2	Recap
2	October 14	Edmonton	5–3	Calgary		Talbot	19,289	2–0–0	4	Recap
3	October 16	Buffalo	6–2	Edmonton		Talbot	18,347	2–1–0	4	Recap
4	October 18	Carolina	2–3	Edmonton		Talbot	18,347	3–1–0	6	Recap
5	October 20	St. Louis	1–3	Edmonton		Talbot	18,347	4–1–0	8	Recap
6	October 23	Edmonton	3–0	Winnipeg		Talbot	33,240 (outdoors)	5–1–0	10	Recap
7	October 26	Washington	1–4	Edmonton		Talbot	18,347	6–1–0	12	Recap
8	October 28	Edmonton	2–0	Vancouver		Talbot	18,865	7–1–0	14	Recap
9	October 30	Ottawa	2–0	Edmonton		Talbot	18,347	7–2–0	14	Recap

November: 5–8–2 (Home: 1–4–0; Road: 4–4–2)
#	Date	Visitor	Score	Home	OT	Decision	Attendance	Record	Pts	Recap
10	November 1	Edmonton	2–3	Toronto	OT	Talbot	19,687	7–2–1	15	Recap
11	November 3	Edmonton	3–5	NY Rangers		Talbot	18,006	7–3–1	15	Recap
12	November 5	Edmonton	4–3	NY Islanders	SO	Talbot	13,862	8–3–1	17	Recap
13	November 6	Edmonton	2–1	Detroit		Gustavsson	20,027	9–3–1	19	Recap
14	November 8	Edmonton	3–4	Pittsburgh		Talbot	18,576	9–4–1	19	Recap
15	November 11	Dallas	3–2	Edmonton		Talbot	18,347	9–5–1	19	Recap
16	November 13	NY Rangers	3–1	Edmonton		Talbot	18,347	9–6–1	19	Recap
17	November 15	Edmonton	1–4	Anaheim		Talbot	15,600	9–7–1	19	Recap
18	November 17	Edmonton	2–4	Los Angeles		Gustavsson	18,230	9–8–1	19	Recap
19	November 19	Edmonton	5–2	Dallas		Talbot	14,828	10–8–1	21	Recap
20	November 21	Chicago	0–5	Edmonton		Talbot	18,347	11–8–1	23	Recap
21	November 23	Edmonton	6–3	Colorado		Talbot	15,185	12–8–1	25	Recap
22	November 25	Edmonton	2–3	Arizona	SO	Talbot	14,950	12–8–2	26	Recap
23	November 27	Arizona	2–1	Edmonton		Talbot	18,347	12–9–2	26	Recap
24	November 29	Toronto	4–2	Edmonton		Talbot	18,347	12–10–2	26	Recap

December: 7–2–5 (Home: 4–1–2; Road: 3–1–3)
#	Date	Visitor	Score	Home	OT	Decision	Attendance	Record	Pts	Recap
25	December 1	Edmonton	6–3	Winnipeg		Talbot	15,294	13–10–2	28	Recap
26	December 3	Anaheim	2–3	Edmonton	OT	Talbot	18,347	14–10–2	30	Recap
27	December 4	Minnesota	2–1	Edmonton	OT	Gustavsson	18,347	14–10–3	31	Recap
28	December 6	Edmonton	3–4	Buffalo	OT	Talbot	18,149	14–10–4	32	Recap
29	December 8	Edmonton	5–6	Philadelphia		Gustavsson	19,346	14–11–4	32	Recap
30	December 9	Edmonton	2–3	Minnesota	SO	Talbot	19,019	14–11–5	33	Recap
31	December 11	Winnipeg	2–3	Edmonton		Talbot	18,347	15–11–5	35	Recap
32	December 13	Columbus	3–1	Edmonton		Talbot	18,347	15–12–5	35	Recap
33	December 17	Tampa Bay	2–3	Edmonton	SO	Talbot	18,347	16–12–5	37	Recap
34	December 19	Edmonton	3–2	St. Louis	OT	Talbot	19,357	17–12–5	39	Recap
35	December 21	Edmonton	3–2	Arizona		Talbot	11,378	18–12–5	41	Recap
36	December 23	Edmonton	2–3	San Jose	OT	Talbot	17,562	18–12–6	42	Recap
37	December 29	Los Angeles	1–3	Edmonton		Talbot	18,347	19–12–6	44	Recap
38	December 31	Vancouver	3–2	Edmonton	SO	Talbot	18,347	19–12–7	45	Recap

January: 9–4–1 (Home: 4–2–1; Road: 5–2–0)
#	Date	Visitor	Score	Home	OT	Decision	Attendance	Record	Pts	Recap
39	January 3	Edmonton	1–3	Columbus		Talbot	17,169	19–13–7	45	Recap
40	January 5	Edmonton	4–3	Boston		Talbot	17,565	20–13–7	47	Recap
41	January 7	Edmonton	2–1	New Jersey	OT	Talbot	14,734	21–13–7	49	Recap
42	January 8	Edmonton	3–5	Ottawa		Gustavsson	17,724	21–14–7	49	Recap
43	January 10	San Jose	5–3	Edmonton		Talbot	18,347	21–15–7	49	Recap
44	January 12	New Jersey	2–3	Edmonton	OT	Talbot	18,347	22–15–7	51	Recap
45	January 14	Calgary	1–2	Edmonton	SO	Talbot	18,347	23–15–7	53	Recap
46	January 16	Arizona	1–3	Edmonton		Talbot	18,347	24–15–7	55	Recap
47	January 18	Florida	3–4	Edmonton	OT	Talbot	18,347	25–15–7	57	Recap
48	January 20	Nashville	3–2	Edmonton	SO	Talbot	18,347	25–15–8	58	Recap
49	January 21	Edmonton	7–3	Calgary		Brossoit	19,289	26–15–8	60	Recap
50	January 25	Edmonton	4–0	Anaheim		Talbot	17,174	27–15–8	62	Recap
51	January 26	Edmonton	4–1	San Jose		Talbot	17,562	28–15–8	64	Recap
January 27–29		All-Star Break in Los Angeles
52	January 31	Minnesota	5–2	Edmonton		Talbot	18,347	28–16–8	64	Recap

February: 6–6–0 (Home: 2–1–0; Road: 4–5–0)
#	Date	Visitor	Score	Home	OT	Decision	Attendance	Record	Pts	Recap
53	February 2	Edmonton	0–2	Nashville		Talbot	17,113	28–17–8	64	Recap
54	February 3	Edmonton	1–2	Carolina		Talbot	12,512	28–18–8	64	Recap
55	February 5	Edmonton	1–0	Montreal	SO	Talbot	21,288	29–18–8	66	Recap
56	February 11	Chicago	5–1	Edmonton		Talbot	18,347	29–19–8	66	Recap
57	February 14	Arizona	2–5	Edmonton		Talbot	18,347	30–19–8	68	Recap
58	February 16	Philadelphia	3–6	Edmonton		Talbot	18,347	31–19–8	70	Recap
59	February 18	Edmonton	3–1	Chicago		Talbot	21,918	32–19–8	72	Recap
60	February 21	Edmonton	1–4	Tampa Bay		Brossoit	19,092	32–20–8	72	Recap
61	February 22	Edmonton	4–3	Florida		Talbot	15,300	33–20–8	74	Recap
62	February 24	Edmonton	1–2	Washington		Talbot	18,506	33–21–8	74	Recap
63	February 26	Edmonton	4–5	Nashville		Talbot	17,113	33–22–8	74	Recap
64	February 28	Edmonton	2–1	St. Louis		Talbot	18,944	34–22–8	76	Recap

March: 9–3–1 (Home: 8–2–1; Road: 1–1–0)
#	Date	Visitor	Score	Home	OT	Decision	Attendance	Record	Pts	Recap
65	March 4	Detroit	3–4	Edmonton		Talbot	18,347	35–22–8	78	Recap
66	March 7	NY Islanders	4–1	Edmonton		Talbot	18,347	35–23–8	78	Recap
67	March 10	Pittsburgh	3–2	Edmonton	SO	Talbot	18,347	35–23–9	79	Recap
68	March 12	Montreal	4–1	Edmonton		Talbot	18,347	35–24–9	79	Recap
69	March 14	Dallas	1–7	Edmonton		Talbot	18,347	36–24–9	81	Recap
70	March 16	Boston	4–7	Edmonton		Talbot	18,347	37–24–9	83	Recap
71	March 18	Vancouver	0–2	Edmonton		Talbot	18,347	38–24–9	85	Recap
72	March 20	Los Angeles	0–2	Edmonton		Talbot	18,347	39–24–9	87	Recap
73	March 22	Edmonton	3–4	Anaheim		Talbot	15,310	39–25–9	87	Recap
74	March 23	Edmonton	7–4	Colorado		Brossoit	14,142	40–25–9	89	Recap
75	March 25	Colorado	1–4	Edmonton		Brossoit	18,347	41–25–9	91	Recap
76	March 28	Los Angeles	1–2	Edmonton		Talbot	18,347	42–25–9	93	Recap
77	March 30	San Jose	2–3	Edmonton		Talbot	18,347	43–25–9	95	Recap

April: 4–1–0 (Home: 2–0–0; Road: 2–1–0)
#	Date	Visitor	Score	Home	OT	Decision	Attendance	Record	Pts	Recap
78	April 1	Anaheim	2–3	Edmonton	OT	Talbot	18,347	44–25–9	97	Recap
79	April 4	Edmonton	4–6	Los Angeles		Talbot	18,230	44–26–9	97	Recap
80	April 6	Edmonton	4–2	San Jose		Talbot	17,562	45–26–9	99	Recap
81	April 8	Edmonton	3–2	Vancouver		Talbot	18,865	46–26–9	101	Recap
82	April 9	Vancouver	2–5	Edmonton		Brossoit	18,347	47–26–9	103	Recap

Legend: Win (2 points) Loss (0 points) Overtime/shootout loss (1 point)

=== Playoffs ===
2017 Stanley Cup playoffs

Western Conference First Round vs. (P3) San Jose Sharks: Edmonton wins 4–2
#	Date	Visitor	Score	Home	OT	Decision	Attendance	Series	Recap
1	April 12	San Jose	3–2	Edmonton	OT	Talbot	18,347	0–1	Recap
2	April 14	San Jose	0–2	Edmonton		Talbot	18,347	1–1	Recap
3	April 16	Edmonton	1–0	San Jose		Talbot	17,562	2–1	Recap
4	April 18	Edmonton	0–7	San Jose		Talbot	17,562	2–2	Recap
5	April 20	San Jose	3–4	Edmonton	OT	Talbot	18,347	3–2	Recap
6	April 22	Edmonton	3–1	San Jose		Talbot	17,562	4–2	Recap

Western Conference Second Round vs. (P1) Anaheim Ducks: Anaheim wins 4–3
#	Date	Visitor	Score	Home	OT	Decision	Attendance	Series	Recap
1	April 26	Edmonton	5–3	Anaheim		Talbot	17,174	1–0	Recap
2	April 28	Edmonton	2–1	Anaheim		Talbot	17,174	2–0	Recap
3	April 30	Anaheim	6–3	Edmonton		Talbot	18,347	2–1	Recap
4	May 3	Anaheim	4–3	Edmonton	OT	Talbot	18,347	2–2	Recap
5	May 5	Edmonton	3–4	Anaheim	2OT	Talbot	17,358	2–3	Recap
6	May 7	Anaheim	1–7	Edmonton		Talbot	18,347	3–3	Recap
7	May 10	Edmonton	1–2	Anaheim		Talbot	17,407	3–4	Recap

Legend: Win Loss

== Player statistics ==
As of May 10, 2017

=== Skaters ===
Regular season
Player	GP	G	A	Pts	+/−	PIM
Connor McDavid	82	30	70	100	27	26
Leon Draisaitl	82	29	48	77	7	20
Jordan Eberle	82	20	31	51	3	16
Milan Lucic	82	23	27	50	−3	50
Ryan Nugent-Hopkins	82	18	25	43	−10	29
Patrick Maroon	81	27	15	42	13	95
Oscar Klefbom	82	12	26	38	7	6
Mark Letestu	78	16	19	35	−2	17
Andrej Sekera	80	8	27	35	14	18
Zack Kassian	79	7	17	24	4	101
Adam Larsson	79	4	15	19	21	55
Drake Caggiula	60	7	11	18	3	16
Matt Benning	62	3	12	15	8	29
Benoit Pouliot	67	8	6	14	−5	34
Kris Russell	68	1	12	13	5	23
Tyler Pitlick	31	8	3	11	0	6
Darnell Nurse	44	5	6	11	0	33
Anton Slepyshev	41	4	6	10	5	4
Jesse Puljujarvi	28	1	7	8	5	10
Matt Hendricks	42	4	3	7	−3	29
Eric Gryba	40	2	4	6	−5	65
Iiro Pakarinen	14	2	2	4	2	2
David Desharnais^{†}	18	2	2	4	−1	6
Anton Lander	22	1	3	4	2	6
Mark Fayne	4	0	2	2	1	0
Jujhar Khaira	10	1	0	1	1	2
Brandon Davidson^{‡}	28	0	1	1	1	16
Dillon Simpson	3	0	0	0	0	2
Jordan Oesterle	2	0	0	0	−1	0
Taylor Beck^{‡}	3	0	0	0	−1	4

Playoffs
Player	GP	G	A	Pts	+/−	PIM
Leon Draisaitl	13	6	10	16	8	19
Mark Letestu	13	5	6	11	−4	2
Connor McDavid	13	5	4	9	3	2
Patrick Maroon	13	3	5	8	2	28
Milan Lucic	13	2	4	6	−5	20
Adam Larsson	13	2	4	6	−4	4
Oscar Klefbom	12	2	3	5	−2	0
David Desharnais	13	1	3	4	3	0
Kris Russell	13	0	4	4	2	4
Ryan Nugent-Hopkins	13	0	4	4	−3	2
Zack Kassian	13	3	0	3	1	27
Anton Slepyshev	12	3	0	3	1	4
Drake Caggiula	13	3	0	3	0	25
Andrej Sekera	11	1	2	3	−1	2
Matt Benning	12	0	3	3	3	12
Jordan Eberle	13	0	2	2	−6	2
Darnell Nurse	13	0	2	2	0	6
Griffin Reinhart	1	0	1	1	0	0
Iiro Pakarinen	1	0	0	0	−1	0
Benoit Pouliot	13	0	0	0	−2	4
Eric Gryba	3	0	0	0	−1	4

=== Goaltenders ===
Regular season
Player	GP	GS	TOI	W	L	OT	GA	GAA	SA	SV%	SO	G	A	PIM
Cam Talbot	73	73	4294:00	42	22	8	171	2.39	2117	.919	7	0	0	4
Laurent Brossoit	8	4	332:27	4	1	0	11	1.99	153	.928	0	0	0	0
Jonas Gustavsson	7	5	328:58	1	3	1	17	3.10	122	.878	0	0	0	0

Playoffs
Player	GP	GS	TOI	W	L	GA	GAA	SA	SV%	SO	G	A	PIM
Cam Talbot	13	13	799:23	7	6	33	2.48	437	.924	2	0	1	0
Laurent Brossoit	1	0	27:08	0	0	2	4.42	8	.750	0	0	0	0

^{†}Denotes player spent time with another team before joining the Oilers. Stats reflect time with the Oilers only.
^{‡}Traded mid-season. Stats reflect time with the Oilers only.
Bold/italics denotes franchise record

== Awards and records ==
=== NHL Awards ===
none

=== Records ===
- 42: An Oilers record for most wins by a goaltender in a single season by Cam Talbot

- 41: Talbot passed the 29-year-old Oilers record of 40 wins by a goaltender (Grant Fuhr) in a single season on April 6, 2017

- 73: Talbot tied the 29-year-old Oilers record of 73 games started by a goaltender (Fuhr) in a single season

Note: both of these Edmonton Oilers goaltender records still stand as of the end of the 2025-2026 season

== Milestones ==
Regular season
Player	Milestone	Reached
Jesse Puljujarvi	1st NHL game 1st NHL goal 1st NHL point	October 12, 2016
Milan Lucic	400th NHL point	October 16, 2016
Anton Slepyshev	1st NHL goal	October 18, 2016
Jesse Puljujarvi	1st NHL assist	October 26, 2016
Anton Lander	200th NHL game	October 28, 2016
Matt Benning	1st NHL game	November 1, 2016
Tyler Pitlick	1st NHL assist	November 1, 2016
Matt Benning	1st NHL assist 1st NHL point	November 5, 2016
Patrick Maroon	100th NHL point	November 8, 2016
Benoit Pouliot	500th NHL game	November 13, 2016
Patrick Maroon	300th NHL PIM	November 17, 2016
Drake Caggiula	1st NHL game 1st NHL point 1st NHL assist	November 19, 2016
Connor McDavid	1st NHL hat-trick	November 19, 2016
Ryan Nugent-Hopkins	100th NHL PIM	December 1, 2016
Drake Caggiula	1st NHL goal	December 3, 2016
Adam Larsson	300th NHL game	December 3, 2016
Jordan Eberle	200th NHL assist	December 8, 2016
Andrej Sekera	200th NHL point	December 8, 2016
Dillon Simpson	1st NHL game	December 8, 2016
Andrej Sekera	600th NHL game	December 17, 2016
Kris Russell	600th NHL game	December 19, 2016
Mark Letestu	1st NHL Gordie Howe hat trick	December 21, 2016
Patrick Maroon	1st NHL hat-trick	January 5, 2017
Matt Benning	1st NHL goal	January 7, 2017
Kris Russell	200th NHL PIM	January 12, 2017
Jujhar Khaira	1st NHL goal	January 16, 2017
Leon Draisaitl	100th NHL point	January 18, 2017
Connor McDavid	100th NHL point	January 18, 2017
Eric Gryba	300th NHL PIM	January 18, 2017
Laurent Brossoit	1st NHL win	January 21, 2017
Matt Hendricks	500th NHL game	January 21, 2017
Milan Lucic	700th NHL game	February 2, 2017
Connor McDavid	100th NHL game	February 5, 2017
Zack Kassian	500th NHL PIM	February 11, 2017
Matt Hendricks	100th NHL point	February 16, 2017
Mark Letestu	100th NHL assist	February 18, 2017
Darnell Nurse	100th NHL game	March 7, 2017
Zack Kassian	300th NHL game	March 14, 2017
Jordan Eberle	500th NHL game	March 25, 2017
Adam Larsson	200th NHL PIM	March 30, 2017
Milan Lucic	3rd NHL hat-trick 2nd NHL natural hat-trick	April 6, 2017
Patrick Maroon	300th NHL game	April 6, 2017
Milan Lucic	900th NHL PIM	April 8, 2017
Connor McDavid	100th NHL assist	April 8, 2017
Jordan Eberle	2nd NHL hat-trick	April 9, 2017

Playoffs
Player	Milestone	Reached
Drake Caggiula	1st NHL playoff game	April 12, 2017
Leon Draisaitl	1st NHL playoff game	April 12, 2017
Ryan Nugent-Hopkins	1st NHL playoff game	April 12, 2017
Darnell Nurse	1st NHL playoff game	April 12, 2017
Iiro Pakarinen	1st NHL playoff game	April 12, 2017
Jordan Eberle	1st NHL playoff game 1st NHL playoff assist 1st NHL playoff point	April 12, 2017
Connor McDavid	1st NHL playoff game 1st NHL playoff assist 1st NHL playoff point	April 12, 2017
Oscar Klefbom	1st NHL playoff game 1st NHL playoff goal 1st NHL playoff point	April 12, 2017
Matt Benning	1st NHL playoff game	April 14, 2017
Anton Slepyshev	1st NHL playoff game	April 14, 2017
Zack Kassian	1st NHL playoff goal 1st NHL playoff point	April 14, 2017
Patrick Maroon	50th NHL playoff PIM	April 14, 2017
Connor McDavid	1st NHL playoff goal	April 14, 2017
Darnell Nurse	1st NHL playoff assist 1st NHL playoff point	April 14, 2017
Cam Talbot	1st NHL playoff win 1st NHL playoff shutout 1st NHL playoff assist	April 14, 2017
Laurent Brossoit	1st NHL playoff game	April 18, 2017
Matt Benning	1st NHL playoff assist 1st NHL playoff point	April 20, 2017
Leon Draisaitl	1st NHL playoff assist 1st NHL playoff point	April 20, 2017
Andrej Sekera	1st NHL playoff assist	April 20, 2017
Leon Draisaitl	1st NHL playoff goal	April 22, 2017
Adam Larsson	1st NHL playoff assist	April 22, 2017
Anton Slepyshev	1st NHL playoff goal 1st NHL playoff point	April 22, 2017
Ryan Nugent-Hopkins	1st NHL playoff assist 1st NHL playoff point	April 26, 2017
Drake Caggiula	1st NHL playoff goal	May 3, 2017
David Desharnais	50th NHL playoff game	May 7, 2017
Leon Draisaitl	1st NHL playoff hat-trick	May 7, 2017
Griffin Reinhart	1st NHL playoff assist 1st NHL playoff point	May 7, 2017

== Transactions ==
Following the end of the Oilers' 2015–16 season, and during the 2016–17 season, this team has been involved in the following transactions:

=== Trades ===
Date	Details		Ref
June 29, 2016	To New Jersey Devils Taylor Hall	To Edmonton Oilers Adam Larsson
October 7, 2016	To St. Louis Blues Nail Yakupov	To Edmonton Oilers Zach Pochiro; 3rd-round pick in 2017
February 1, 2017	To Arizona Coyotes Mitchell Moroz	To Edmonton Oilers Henrik Samuelsson
February 28, 2017	To Montreal Canadiens Brandon Davidson	To Edmonton Oilers David Desharnais
March 1, 2017	To New York Rangers Taylor Beck	To Edmonton Oilers Justin Fontaine

=== Free agents acquired ===
Date	Player	Former team	Contract terms (in U.S. dollars)	Ref
July 1, 2016	Mark Fraser	Binghamton Senators	1 year, $575,000	
July 1, 2016	Jonas Gustavsson	Boston Bruins	1 year, $800,000	
July 1, 2016	Milan Lucic	Los Angeles Kings	7 years, $42 million	
July 3, 2016	Taylor Beck	San Antonio Rampage	1 year, $650,000	
August 27, 2016	Matt Benning	Northeastern University (NCAA)	2 years, $2.15 million entry-level contract	
October 7, 2016	Kris Russell	Dallas Stars	1 year, 3.1 million	
March 1, 2017	Ryan Mantha	Niagara IceDogs (OHL)	3 years, $2.775 million entry-level contract	
March 28, 2017	Joseph Gambardella	University of Massachusetts Lowell (NCAA)	2 years, $1.45 million entry-level contract	
April 10, 2017	Shane Starrett	United States Air Force Academy (NCAA)	2 years, $1.85 million entry-level contract	

=== Free agents lost ===
Date	Player	New team	Contract terms (in U.S. dollars)	Ref
June 17, 2016	Rob Klinkhammer	Dinamo Minsk (KHL)	1 year $500,000	
July 1, 2016	Adam Clendening	New York Rangers	1 year, $600,000	
July 1, 2016	Andrew Miller	Carolina Hurricanes	1 year, $650,000	
July 2, 2016	Brad Hunt	St. Louis Blues	1 year, $600,000	
July 3, 2016	Adam Cracknell	Dallas Stars	1 year, $600,000	
July 5, 2016	Luke Gazdic	New Jersey Devils	1 year, $700,000	
September 16, 2016	Nikita Nikitin	Avangard Omsk (KHL)	1 year $1.5 million	
September 28, 2016	Ryan Hamilton	Bakersfield Condors (AHL)		
October 2, 2016	Kale Kessy	Tulsa Oilers (ECHL)	1 year $500,000	
October 9, 2016	Lauri Korpikoski	Dallas Stars	1 year, $1 million	
November 30, 2016	Adam Pardy	Nashville Predators	1 year, $575,000	
April 4, 2017	Bogdan Yakimov	Neftekhimik Nizhnekamsk (KHL)		
May 4, 2017	Jonas Gustavsson	Linköpings HC (SHL)	3 years	
May 12, 2017	Jere Sallinen	Örebro HK (SHL)	2 years	
May 25, 2017	Anton Lander	Ak Bars Kazan (KHL)	2 years, $1 million	

=== Player signings ===
Date	Player	Contract terms (in U.S. dollars)	Ref
May 19, 2016	Zack Kassian	1 year, $1.5 million	
June 17, 2016	Tyler Pitlick	1 year, $725,000	
June 20, 2016	Jordan Oesterle	1 year, $585,000	
June 27, 2016	Iiro Pakarinen	1 year, $725,000	
July 2, 2016	Ethan Bear	3 years, $2.165 million entry-level contract	
July 13, 2016	Jesse Puljujarvi	3 years, $2.775 million entry-level contract	
July 29, 2016	David Musil	1 year, $600,000	
October 11, 2016	Eric Gryba	1 year, $950,000	
April 7, 2017	William Lagesson	3 years, $2.225 million entry-level contract	
April 10, 2017	Ziyat Paigin	2 years, $1.85 million entry-level contract	
May 17, 2017	Dylan Wells	3 years, entry-level contract	
May 21, 2017	Iiro Pakarinen	1 year, $725,000 contract extension	

== Draft picks ==
Below are the Edmonton Oilers' selections at the 2016 NHL entry draft, to be held on June 24–25, 2016, at the First Niagara Center in Buffalo.

Round	#	Player	Pos	Nationality	College/Junior/Club team (League)
1	4	Jesse Puljujarvi	Right wing	Finland	Oulun Kärpät (Liiga)
2	32	Tyler Benson	Left wing	Canada	Vancouver Giants (WHL)
3	63	Markus Niemelainen	Defence	Finland	Saginaw Spirit (OHL)
3	84^{[a]}	Matthew Cairns	Defence	Canada	Georgetown Raiders (OJHL)
3	91^{[b]}	Filip Berglund	Defence	Sweden	Skellefteå AIK (SuperElit)
5	123	Dylan Wells	Goaltender	Canada	Peterborough Petes (OHL)
5	149^{[c]}	Graham McPhee	Left wing	United States	U.S. National Team Development Program
6	153	Aapeli Rasanen	Centre	Finland	Tappara (Jr. A SM-liiga)
7	183	Vincent Desharnais	Defence	Canada	Providence College (NCAA)

Notes

- ^{[a]} The Florida Panthers' third-round pick went to the Edmonton Oilers as the result of a trade on February 27, 2016, that sent Teddy Purcell to Florida in exchange for this pick (being conditional at the time of the trade). The condition – Edmonton will receive the lower of Minnesota or Florida's third-round pick in 2016 – was converted on April 24, 2016, when Minnesota was eliminated from the 2016 Stanley Cup playoffs ensuring that the Florida's pick would be lower than Minnesota's.
- ^{[b]} The Pittsburgh Penguins' third-round pick went to the Edmonton Oilers as the result of a trade on February 27, 2016, that sent Justin Schultz to Pittsburgh in exchange for this pick.
- The Edmonton Oilers' fourth-round pick went to the Anaheim Ducks as the result of a trade on February 29, 2016, that sent Patrick Maroon to Edmonton in exchange for Martin Gernat and this pick.
- ^{[c]} The St. Louis Blues' fifth-round pick went to the Edmonton Oilers as the result of a trade on February 27, 2016, that sent Anders Nilsson to St. Louis in exchange for Niklas Lundstrom and this pick.
