= 2016–17 Detroit Red Wings season =

Sports season

2016–17 Detroit Red Wings
- Division: 7th Atlantic
- Conference: 14th Eastern
- 2016–17 record: 33–36–13
- Home record: 17–17–7
- Road record: 16–19–6
- Goals for: 207
- Goals against: 244

Team information
- General manager: Ken Holland
- Coach: Jeff Blashill
- Captain: Henrik Zetterberg
- Alternate captains: Justin Abdelkader; Niklas Kronwall
- Arena: Joe Louis Arena
- Average attendance: 20,027 (100%); Total: 821,107
- Minor league affiliates: Grand Rapids Griffins (AHL); Toledo Walleye (ECHL)

Team leaders
- Goals: Tomas Tatar (25)
- Assists: Henrik Zetterberg (51)
- Points: Henrik Zetterberg (68)
- Penalty minutes: Jonathan Ericsson (63)
- Plus/minus: Henrik Zetterberg (+15)
- Wins: Petr Mrazek (18)
- Goals against average: Jimmy Howard (2.10)

The 2016–17 Detroit Red Wings season was the 91st season for the National Hockey League (NHL) franchise that was established on September 25, 1926. It was the Red Wings' final season at Joe Louis Arena before their move to Little Caesars Arena for the 2017–18 season. This season also marked the end of the Red Wings playoff streak at 25 consecutive seasons as they missed the playoffs for the first time since the 1989–90 season, and was their first losing season since 1990–91. The longest active streak in major North American sports now belonged to the San Antonio Spurs of the NBA who made the playoffs every year since 1998 until 2020.

== Off-season ==
On May 10, 2016, the Red Wings named Doug Houda as an assistant coach.

On May 17, 2016, the Red Wings named Jeff Salajko as their new goaltending coach, replacing long-time former coach Jim Bedard.

On June 9, 2016, the Red Wings named John Torchetti as an assistant coach.

On September 16, 2016, the Red Wings named Shawn Horcoff director of player development.

== Standings ==
Atlantic Division
Pos	Team	GP	W	L	OTL	ROW	GF	GA	GD	Pts
1	y – Montreal Canadiens	82	47	26	9	44	226	200	+26	103
2	x – Ottawa Senators	82	44	28	10	38	212	214	−2	98
3	x – Boston Bruins	82	44	31	7	42	234	212	+22	95
4	x – Toronto Maple Leafs	82	40	27	15	39	251	242	+9	95
5	Tampa Bay Lightning	82	42	30	10	38	234	227	+7	94
6	Florida Panthers	82	35	36	11	30	210	237	−27	81
7	Detroit Red Wings	82	33	36	13	24	207	244	−37	79
8	Buffalo Sabres	82	33	37	12	31	201	237	−36	78

Source: National Hockey League
x – Clinched playoff spot; y – Clinched division

Eastern Conference Wild Card
Pos	Div	Team	GP	W	L	OTL	ROW	GF	GA	GD	Pts
1	ME	x – New York Rangers	82	48	28	6	45	256	220	+36	102
2	AT	x – Toronto Maple Leafs	82	40	27	15	39	251	242	+9	95
3	ME	New York Islanders	82	41	29	12	39	241	242	−1	94
4	AT	Tampa Bay Lightning	82	42	30	10	38	234	227	+7	94
5	ME	Philadelphia Flyers	82	39	33	10	32	219	236	−17	88
6	ME	Carolina Hurricanes	82	36	31	15	33	215	236	−21	87
7	AT	Florida Panthers	82	35	36	11	30	210	237	−27	81
8	AT	Detroit Red Wings	82	33	36	13	24	207	244	−37	79
9	AT	Buffalo Sabres	82	33	37	12	31	201	237	−36	78
10	ME	New Jersey Devils	82	28	40	14	25	183	244	−61	70

Source: National Hockey League
x – Clinched playoff spot

== Schedule and results ==
=== Pre-season ===
2016 Pre-season Game Log: 6–1–1 (Home: 3–0–1; Road: 3–1–0)
#	Date	Visitor	Score	Home	OT	Decision	Attendance	Record	Recap
1	September 27	Pittsburgh	2–4	Detroit		Howard	16,279	1–0–0	Recap
2	September 28	Detroit	5–1	Boston		Coreau	16,631	2–0–0	Recap
3	September 30	Boston	2–1	Detroit	OT	Howard	—	2–0–1	Recap
4	October 2	Chicago	3–6	Detroit		Mrazek	17,962	3–0–1	Recap
5	October 4	Detroit	1–6	Chicago		Howard	20,407	3–1–1	Recap
6	October 5	Detroit	5–2	Pittsburgh		Coreau	17,848	4–1–1	Recap
7	October 7	Detroit	2–1	Toronto		—	—	5–1–1	Recap
8	October 8	Toronto	3–4	Detroit		Mrazek	20,027	6–1–1	Recap

=== Regular season ===
2016–17 Game Log

October: 6–4–0 (Home: 4–2–0; Road: 2–2–0)
#	Date	Visitor	Score	Home	OT	Decision	Attendance	Record	Pts	Recap
1	October 13	Detroit	4–6	Tampa Bay		Mrazek	19,092	0–1–0	0	Recap
2	October 15	Detroit	1–4	Florida		Mrazek	16,868	0–2–0	0	Recap
3	October 17	Ottawa	1–5	Detroit		Mrazek	20,027	1–2–0	2	Recap
4	October 19	Detroit	2–1	NY Rangers		Howard	18,200	2–2–0	4	Recap
5	October 21	Nashville	3–5	Detroit		Mrazek	20,027	3–2–0	6	Recap
6	October 22	San Jose	0–3	Detroit		Howard	20,027	4–2–0	8	Recap
7	October 25	Carolina	2–4	Detroit		Mrazek	20,027	5–2–0	10	Recap
8	October 27	Detroit	2–1	St. Louis	SO	Mrazek	19,229	6–2–0	12	Recap
9	October 29	Boston	1–0	Detroit		Howard	20,027	6–3–0	12	Recap
10	October 30	Florida	5–2	Detroit		Mrazek	20,027	6–4–0	12	Recap

November: 5–6–2 (Home: 2–4–1; Road: 3–2–1)
#	Date	Visitor	Score	Home	OT	Decision	Attendance	Record	Pts	Recap
11	November 2	Detroit	3–4	Philadelphia	OT	Mrazek	19,309	6–4–1	13	Recap
12	November 4	Winnipeg	5–3	Detroit		Mrazek	20,027	6–5–1	13	Recap
13	November 6	Edmonton	2–1	Detroit		Howard	20,027	6–6–1	13	Recap
14	November 8	Detroit	3–2	Philadelphia	SO	Howard	19,598	7–6–1	15	Recap
15	November 10	Vancouver	1–3	Detroit		Howard	20,027	8–6–1	17	Recap
16	November 12	Detroit	0–5	Montreal		Howard	21,288	8–7–1	17	Recap
17	November 15	Tampa Bay	4–3	Detroit		Mrazek	20,027	8–8–1	17	Recap
18	November 18	Detroit	0–1	Washington		Howard	18,506	8–9–1	17	Recap
19	November 20	Calgary	3–2	Detroit		Howard	20,027	8–10–1	17	Recap
20	November 23	Detroit	2–1	Buffalo	SO	Howard	18,360	9–10–1	19	Recap
21	November 25	Detroit	5–4	New Jersey	OT	Mrazek	15,612	10–10–1	21	Recap
22	November 26	Montreal	2–1	Detroit	OT	Mrazek	20,027	10–10–2	22	Recap
23	November 29	Dallas	1–3	Detroit		Mrazek	20,027	11–10–2	24	Recap

December: 5–6–2 (Home: 1–4–2; Road: 4–2–0)
#	Date	Visitor	Score	Home	OT	Decision	Attendance	Record	Pts	Recap
24	December 1	Florida	2–1	Detroit	OT	Mrazek	20,027	11–10–3	25	Recap
25	December 3	Detroit	3–5	Pittsburgh		Coreau	18,661	11–11–3	25	Recap
26	December 4	Detroit	4–3	NY Islanders	OT	Mrazek	13,789	12–11–3	27	Recap
27	December 6	Detroit	4–3	Winnipeg	SO	Mrazek	15,294	13–11–3	29	Recap
28	December 9	Columbus	4–1	Detroit		Mrazek	20,027	13–12–3	29	Recap
29	December 11	Philadelphia	1–0	Detroit	OT	Howard	20,027	13–12–4	30	Recap
30	December 13	Arizona	4–1	Detroit		Howard	20,027	13–13–4	30	Recap
31	December 15	Los Angeles	4–1	Detroit		Howard	20,027	13–14–4	30	Recap
32	December 17	Anaheim	4–6	Detroit		Mrazek	20,027	14–14–4	32	Recap
—	December 19	Detroit	—	Carolina	Postponed due to poor ice conditions, rescheduled to March 27, 2017
33	December 20	Detroit	1–4	Tampa Bay		Mrazek	19,092	14–15–4	32	Recap
34	December 23	Detroit	4–3	Florida	SO	Coreau	15,374	15–15–4	34	Recap
35	December 27	Buffalo	4–3	Detroit		Mrazek	20,027	15–16–4	34	Recap
36	December 29	Detroit	3–2	Ottawa	OT	Coreau	20,011	16–16–4	36	Recap

January: 4–5–5 (Home: 3–2–1; Road: 1–3–4)
#	Date	Visitor	Score	Home	OT	Decision	Attendance	Record	Pts	Recap
37	January 1^{1}	Detroit	4–5	Toronto	OT	Coreau	40,148 (outdoors)	16–16–5	37	Recap
38	January 4	Detroit	0–2	Anaheim		Mrazek	17,174	16–17–5	37	Recap
39	January 5	Detroit	4–0	Los Angeles		Coreau	18,230	17–17–5	39	Recap
40	January 7	Detroit	3–6	San Jose		Mrazek	17,562	17–18–5	39	Recap
41	January 10	Detroit	3–4	Chicago	OT	Mrazek	22,019	17–18–6	40	Recap
42	January 12	Detroit	2–5	Dallas		Mrazek	18,532	17–19–6	40	Recap
43	January 14	Pittsburgh	3–6	Detroit		Coreau	20,027	18–19–6	42	Recap
44	January 16	Montreal	0–1	Detroit		Coreau	20,027	19–19–6	44	Recap
45	January 18	Boston	5–6	Detroit	SO	Mrazek	20,027	20–19–6	46	Recap
46	January 20	Detroit	2–3	Buffalo	OT	Mrazek	18,942	20–19–7	47	Recap
47	January 22	NY Rangers	1–0	Detroit	OT	Coreau	20,027	20–19–8	48	Recap
48	January 24	Detroit	3–4	Boston	OT	Coreau	17,565	20–19–9	49	Recap
49	January 25	Toronto	4–0	Detroit		Mrazek	20,027	20–20–9	49	Recap
All-Star Break in Los Angeles
50	January 31	New Jersey	4–3	Detroit		Coreau	20,027	20–21–9	49	Recap
NHL Centennial Classic, played at BMO Field.

February: 5–5–1 (Home: 2–2–1; Road: 3–3–0)
#	Date	Visitor	Score	Home	OT	Decision	Attendance	Record	Pts	Recap
51	February 3	NY Islanders	4–5	Detroit		Mrazek	20,027	21–21–9	51	Recap
52	February 4	Detroit	1–0	Nashville		Mrazek	17,204	22–21–9	53	Recap
53	February 7	Columbus	3–2	Detroit	OT	Mrazek	20,027	22–21–10	54	Recap
54	February 9	Detroit	3–6	Washington		Mrazek	18,506	22–22–10	54	Recap
55	February 11	Detroit	1–2	Columbus		Mrazek	19,143	22–23–10	54	Recap
56	February 12	Detroit	3–6	Minnesota		Coreau	19,141	22–24–10	54	Recap
57	February 15	St. Louis	2–0	Detroit		Mrazek	20,027	22–25–10	54	Recap
58	February 18	Washington	2–3	Detroit	SO	Mrazek	20,027	23–25–10	56	Recap
59	February 19	Detroit	5–2	Pittsburgh		Mrazek	18,664	24–25–10	58	Recap
60	February 21	NY Islanders	3–1	Detroit		Mrazek	20,027	24–26–10	58	Recap
61	February 28	Detroit	3–2	Vancouver	OT	Mrazek	18,865	25–26–10	60	Recap

March: 6–8–2 (Home: 3–2–1; Road: 3–6–1)
#	Date	Visitor	Score	Home	OT	Decision	Attendance	Record	Pts	Recap
62	March 3	Detroit	2–3	Calgary	OT	Mrazek	19,289	25–26–11	61	Recap
63	March 4	Detroit	3–4	Edmonton		Mrazek	18,347	25–27–11	61	Recap
64	March 7	Detroit	2–3	Toronto		Mrazek	19,060	25–28–11	61	Recap
65	March 8	Detroit	1–6	Boston		Coreau	17,565	25–29–11	61	Recap
66	March 10	Chicago	2–4	Detroit		Howard	20,027	26–29–11	63	Recap
67	March 12	NY Rangers	4–1	Detroit		Mrazek	20,027	26–30–11	63	Recap
68	March 15	Detroit	1–3	Colorado		Howard	16,764	26–31–11	63	Recap
69	March 16	Detroit	5–4	Arizona	SO	Mrazek	15,036	27–31–11	65	Recap
70	March 18	Colorado	1−5	Detroit		Howard	20,027	28−31−11	67	Recap
71	March 20	Buffalo	2−1	Detroit		Mrazek	20,027	28−32−11	67	Recap
72	March 21	Detroit	2−1	Montreal	OT	Howard	21,288	29−32−11	69	Recap
73	March 24	Tampa Bay	2−1	Detroit	OT	Mrazek	20,027	29−32−12	70	Recap
74	March 26	Minnesota	2−3	Detroit	OT	Howard	20,027	30−32−12	72	Recap
75	March 27	Detroit	4−3	Carolina	OT	Mrazek	11,516	31−32−12	74	Recap
76	March 28	Detroit	1−4	Carolina		Howard	9,427	31−33−12	74	Recap
77	March 30	Detroit	3−5	Tampa Bay		Mrazek	19,092	31−34−12	74	Recap

April: 2–2–1 (Home: 2–1–1; Road: 0–1–0)
#	Date	Visitor	Score	Home	OT	Decision	Attendance	Record	Pts	Recap
78	April 1	Toronto	5–4	Detroit		Howard	20,027	31–35–12	74	Recap
79	April 3	Ottawa	4–5	Detroit	SO	Mrazek	20,027	32–35–12	76	Recap
80	April 4	Detroit	0–2	Ottawa		Howard	17,166	32–36–12	76	Recap
81	April 8	Montreal	3–2	Detroit	OT	Mrazek	20,027	32–36–13	77	Recap
82	April 9	New Jersey	1–4	Detroit		Howard	20,027	33–36–13	79	Recap

Legend: Win (2 points) Loss (0 points) Overtime/shootout loss (1 point)

== Player statistics ==
=== Skaters ===
Regular season
Player	GP	G	A	Pts	+/−	PIM
Henrik Zetterberg	82	17	51	68	15	22
Gustav Nyquist	76	12	36	48	0	18
Tomas Tatar	82	25	21	46	−8	26
Frans Nielsen	79	17	24	41	−19	18
Thomas Vanek^{‡}	48	15	23	38	2	16
Anthony Mantha	60	17	19	36	10	53
Mike Green	72	14	22	36	−20	40
Dylan Larkin	80	17	15	32	−28	37
Andreas Athanasiou	64	18	11	29	−7	28
Justin Abdelkader	64	7	14	21	−20	50
Darren Helm	50	8	9	17	−6	20
Luke Glendening	74	3	11	14	−10	26
Nick Jensen	49	4	9	13	−7	12
Riley Sheahan	80	2	11	13	−29	14
Niklas Kronwall	57	2	11	13	−7	32
Danny DeKeyser	82	4	8	12	−22	33
Xavier Ouellet	66	3	9	12	2	51
Jonathan Ericsson	51	1	8	9	−2	63
Drew Miller	55	5	2	7	−12	18
Ryan Sproul	27	1	6	7	−8	6
Steve Ott^{‡}	42	3	3	6	−6	63
Alexei Marchenko^{‡}	30	0	6	6	6	12
Brendan Smith^{‡}	33	2	3	5	−1	34
Tomas Nosek	11	1	0	1	−1	2
Matt Lorito	2	0	1	1	0	0
Ben Street	6	0	1	1	1	0
Tomas Jurco^{‡}	16	0	0	0	−8	2
Robbie Russo	19	0	0	0	2	2
Tyler Bertuzzi	7	0	0	0	−1	0
Brian Lashoff	5	0	0	0	−3	0
Mitch Callahan	4	0	0	0	0	0
Evgeny Svechnikov	2	0	0	0	0	0
Dan Renouf	1	0	0	0	0	0

=== Goaltenders ===
Regular season
Player	GP	GS	TOI	W	L	OT	GA	GAA	SA	SV%	SO	G	A	PIM
Petr Mrazek	50	44	2,858	18	21	9	145	3.04	1,462	.901	1	0	0	2
Jimmy Howard	26	24	1,397	10	11	1	49	2.10	675	.927	1	0	0	2
Jared Coreau	14	14	712	5	4	3	41	3.46	362	.887	2	0	0	0

^{†}Denotes player spent time with another team before joining the Red Wings. Stats reflect time with the Red Wings only.
^{‡}Traded mid-season
Bold/italics denotes franchise record

== Awards and honours ==
=== Awards ===
Regular season
Player	Award	Awarded
Mike Green	NHL Third Star of the Week	October 24, 2016

=== Milestones ===
Regular season
Player	Milestone	Reached
Mike Green	400th career NHL point 1st career NHL hat-trick	October 17, 2016
Ryan Sproul	1st career NHL assist 1st career NHL point	October 21, 2016
Jonathan Ericsson	100th career NHL point	October 22, 2016
Steve Ott	800th career NHL game	October 27, 2016
Petr Mrazek	100th career NHL game	October 27, 2016
Tyler Bertuzzi	1st career NHL game	November 8, 2016
Ryan Sproul	1st career NHL goal	November 15, 2016
Dylan Larkin	100th career NHL game	November 23, 2016
Justin Abdelkader	500th career NHL game	November 26, 2016
Jonathan Ericsson	500th career NHL game	November 26, 2016
Jared Coreau	1st career NHL game	December 3, 2016
Alexei Marchenko	100th career NHL game	December 9, 2016
Tomas Tatar	1st career NHL hat-trick	December 17, 2016
Nick Jensen	1st career NHL game 1st career NHL assist 1st career NHL point	December 20, 2016
Jared Coreau	1st career NHL win	December 23, 2016
Tomas Tatar	300th career NHL game	January 1, 2017
Jared Coreau	1st career NHL shutout	January 5, 2017
Gustav Nyquist	300th career NHL game	January 5, 2017
Justin Abdelkader	100th career NHL assist	January 20, 2017
Gustav Nyquist	100th career NHL assist	January 24, 2017
Nick Jensen	1st career NHL goal	January 31, 2017
Mike Green	700th career NHL game	February 28, 2017
Robbie Russo	1st career NHL game	March 7, 2017
Niklas Kronwall	300th career NHL assist	March 18, 2017
Dan Renouf	1st career NHL game	March 27, 2017
Tomas Nosek	1st career NHL goal 1st career NHL point	March 28, 2017
Henrik Zetterberg	900th career NHL point	March 30, 2017
Evgeny Svechnikov	1st career NHL game	April 3, 2017
Jimmy Howard	400th career NHL game	April 4, 2017
Matt Lorito	1st career NHL game 1st career NHL assist 1st career NHL point	April 8, 2017
Henrik Zetterberg	1,000th career NHL game	April 9, 2017

== Suspensions/fines ==
Player	Explanation	Length	Salary	Date issued
Steve Ott	Spearing Boston Bruins defenseman Zdeno Chara during NHL Game No. 115 in Detroit on Saturday, October 29, 2016, at 0:12 of the first period.	—	$2,222.22	October 30, 2016
Gustav Nyquist	High-sticking Minnesota Wild defenseman Jared Spurgeon during NHL Game No. 829 in Minnesota on Sunday, February 12, 2017, at 14:13 of the first period.	6 games	$158,333.34	February 15, 2017

== Transactions ==
=== Trades ===
Date	Details		Ref
June 24, 2016	To Arizona Coyotes Pavel Datsyuk; 16th overall pick in 2016	To Detroit Red Wings Joe Vitale; NYR's 20th overall pick in 2016; 53rd overall pick in 2016
February 24, 2017	To Chicago Blackhawks Tomas Jurco	To Detroit Red Wings 3rd round pick in 2017
February 28, 2017	To New York Rangers Brendan Smith	To Detroit Red Wings 3rd round pick in 2017; OTT's 2nd round pick in 2018
February 28, 2017	To Montreal Canadiens Steve Ott	To Detroit Red Wings 6th round pick in 2018
March 1, 2017	To Florida Panthers Thomas Vanek ^{[a]}	To Detroit Red Wings Dylan McIlrath; Conditional 3rd round pick in 2017

Notes

- ^{a} Detroit to retain 50% ($1.3 million) of salary as part of trade.

=== Free agents acquired ===
Date	Player	Former team	Contract terms (in U.S. dollars)	Ref
July 1, 2016	Frans Nielsen	New York Islanders	6 years, $31.5 million	
July 1, 2016	Thomas Vanek	Minnesota Wild	1 year, $2.6 million	
July 1, 2016	Steve Ott	St. Louis Blues	1 year, $800,000	
July 1, 2016	Ben Street	San Antonio Rampage	1 year, $600,000	
July 1, 2016	Edward Pasquale	St. John's IceCaps	1 year, $575,000	
July 1, 2016	Matt Lorito	Albany Devils	2 years, two-way contract	
May 2, 2017	Matej Machovsky	HC Plzen	1 year, $925,000	
May 24, 2017	Libor Sulak	Orli Znojmo	2 years, $1.85 million entry-level	

=== Free agents lost ===
Date	Player	New team	Contract terms (in U.S. dollars)	Ref
July 1, 2016	Andy Miele	Philadelphia Flyers	1 year, $600,000	
September 28, 2016	Kyle Quincey	New Jersey Devils	1 year, $1.25 million	

=== Claimed via waivers ===
Player	Former team	Date	Ref
Martin Frk	Carolina Hurricanes	November 1, 2016	

=== Lost via waivers ===
Player	New team	Date	Ref
Martin Frk	Carolina Hurricanes	October 9, 2016	
Teemu Pulkkinen	Minnesota Wild	October 11, 2016	
Alexei Marchenko	Toronto Maple Leafs	February 4, 2017	

=== Lost via retirement ===
Player	Ref
Brad Richards	

=== Player signings ===
Date	Player	Contract terms (in U.S. dollars)	Ref
June 27, 2016	Drew Miller	1 year, $1.025 million contract extension	
July 1, 2016	Darren Helm	5 years, $19.25 million contract extension	
July 1, 2016	Alexei Marchenko	2 years, $2.9 million contract extension	
July 6, 2016	Jared Coreau	2 years, $1.225 million contract extension	
July 13, 2016	Teemu Pulkkinen	1 year, $812,500 contract extension	
July 14, 2016	Luke Glendening	4 years, $7.2 million contract extension	
July 14, 2016	Filip Hronek	3 years, $2.775 million entry-level contract	
July 21, 2016	Mitch Callahan	1 year, $600,000	
July 26, 2016	Danny DeKeyser	6 years, $30 million	
July 27, 2016	Petr Mrazek	2 years, $8 million	
September 23, 2016	Ryan Sproul	2 years, $1.25 million	
October 17, 2016	Givani Smith	3 years, $2.775 million entry-level contract	
February 27, 2017	Nick Jensen	2 years, $1.625 million contract extension	
April 5, 2017	Dennis Cholowski	3 years, $2.775 million entry-level contract	
April 20, 2017	Christoffer Ehn	3 years, $2.775 million entry-level contract	
May 2, 2017	Matej Machovsky	1 year, $925,000	
May 24, 2017	Libor Sulak	2 years, $1.85 million entry-level contract	

== Draft picks ==
Below are the Detroit Red Wings' selections at the 2016 NHL entry draft, held on June 24–25, 2016 at the First Niagara Center in Buffalo, New York.

Round	#	Player	Pos	Nationality	College/Junior/Club team (League)
1	20^{[a]}	Dennis Cholowski	D	Canada	Chilliwack Chiefs (BCHL)
2	46	Givani Smith	RW	Canada	Guelph Storm (OHL)
2	53^{[b]}	Filip Hronek	D	Czech	Mountfield HK (CZE)
4	107	Alfons Malmstrom	D	Sweden	Örebro HK (J20 SuperElit)
5	137	Jordan Sambrook	D	Canada	Erie Otters (OHL)
6	167	Filip Larsson	G	Sweden	Djurgården (Swedish Junior)
7	197	Mattias Elfstrom	C	Sweden	Malmö Redhawks (J20 SuperElit)

Draft notes

- The Detroit Red Wings' first-round pick went to the Arizona Coyotes as the result of a trade on June 24, 2016 that sent Joe Vitale, the Rangers' first-round pick and a compensatory second-round pick both in 2016 (20th and 53rd overall) to Detroit in exchange for Pavel Datsyuk and this pick.
- ^{[a]} The New York Rangers' first-round pick went to the Detroit Red Wings as the result of a trade on June 24, 2016 that sent Pavel Datsyuk and a first-round pick in 2016 (16th overall) to Arizona in exchange for Joe Vitale, a compensatory second-round pick in 2016 (53rd overall) and this pick.

Arizona previously acquired this pick as the result of a trade on March 1, 2015 that sent Keith Yandle, Chris Summers and a fourth-round pick in 2016 to New York in exchange for John Moore, Anthony Duclair, Tampa Bay's second-round pick in 2015 and this pick (being conditional at the time of the trade). The condition – Arizona will receive a first-round pick in 2016 if New York qualifies for the 2016 Stanley Cup playoffs – was converted on April 4, 2016.

- ^{[b]} The Arizona Coyotes' compensatory second-round pick (53rd overall) went to the Detroit Red Wings as the result of a trade on June 24, 2016 that sent Pavel Datsyuk and a first-round pick in 2016 (16th overall) to Arizona in exchange for Joe Vitale, the Rangers' first-round pick in 2016 (20th overall) and this pick.

Arizona previously received this pick as compensation for not signing 2014 first-round draft pick Conner Bleackley, whom they acquired in an earlier trade with Colorado.

- The Detroit Red Wings' third-round pick went to the Pittsburgh Penguins as the result of a trade on June 25, 2016 that sent Beau Bennett to New Jersey in exchange for this pick.

New Jersey previously acquired this pick as the result of a trade on March 2, 2015 that sent Marek Zidlicky to Detroit in exchange for a conditional fifth-round pick in 2015 and this pick (being conditional at the time of the trade). The condition – New Jersey will receive a third-round pick in 2016 if Detroit does not advance to the 2015 Stanley Cup Finals – was converted on April 29, 2015 when Detroit was eliminated from the 2015 Stanley Cup playoffs.
