= 2016–17 Philadelphia Flyers season =

NHL hockey team season

2016–17 Philadelphia Flyers
- Division: 6th Metropolitan
- Conference: 11th Eastern
- 2016–17 record: 39–33–10
- Home record: 25–11–5
- Road record: 14–22–5
- Goals for: 219
- Goals against: 236

Team information
- General manager: Ron Hextall
- Coach: Dave Hakstol
- Captain: Claude Giroux
- Alternate captains: Pierre-Edouard Bellemare (Mar.–Apr.); Wayne Simmonds; Mark Streit (Oct.–Mar.)
- Arena: Wells Fargo Center
- Average attendance: 19,644 (100.5%)
- Minor league affiliates: Lehigh Valley Phantoms; Reading Royals

Team leaders
- Goals: Wayne Simmonds (31)
- Assists: Claude Giroux (44)
- Points: Jakub Voracek (61)
- Penalty minutes: Wayne Simmonds (122)
- Plus/minus: Sean Couturier (+12)
- Wins: Steve Mason (26)
- Goals against average: Anthony Stolarz (2.07)

The 2016–17 Philadelphia Flyers season was the 50th season for the National Hockey League (NHL) franchise that was established on June 5, 1967. This was the 2nd season under head coach Dave Hakstol. The Flyers missed the playoffs, finishing 11th in the Eastern Conference and 6th in the Metropolitan Division.

== Off-season ==
The Flyers had a relatively quiet off-season, with their main actions being to re-sign Radko Gudas and Brayden Schenn to 4-year extensions. Nick Cousins and Brandon Manning who both saw significant time the previous season were also retained. With the Flyers electing not to re-sign Ryan White and Sam Gagner, they moved to sign free agent Dale Weise on July 1 to a 4-year $9.4 million deal, also adding Boyd Gordon on a 1-year deal the same day.

== Standings ==
=== Divisional standings ===
Metropolitan Division
Pos	Team	GP	W	L	OTL	ROW	GF	GA	GD	Pts
1	p – Washington Capitals	82	55	19	8	53	263	182	+81	118
2	x – Pittsburgh Penguins	82	50	21	11	46	282	234	+48	111
3	x – Columbus Blue Jackets	82	50	24	8	47	249	195	+54	108
4	x – New York Rangers	82	48	28	6	45	256	220	+36	102
5	New York Islanders	82	41	29	12	39	241	242	−1	94
6	Philadelphia Flyers	82	39	33	10	32	219	236	−17	88
7	Carolina Hurricanes	82	36	31	15	33	215	236	−21	87
8	New Jersey Devils	82	28	40	14	25	183	244	−61	70

Source: National Hockey League
p – Clinched Presidents' Trophy; x – Clinched playoff spot

=== Conference standings ===
Eastern Conference Wild Card
Pos	Div	Team	GP	W	L	OTL	ROW	GF	GA	GD	Pts
1	ME	x – New York Rangers	82	48	28	6	45	256	220	+36	102
2	AT	x – Toronto Maple Leafs	82	40	27	15	39	251	242	+9	95
3	ME	New York Islanders	82	41	29	12	39	241	242	−1	94
4	AT	Tampa Bay Lightning	82	42	30	10	38	234	227	+7	94
5	ME	Philadelphia Flyers	82	39	33	10	32	219	236	−17	88
6	ME	Carolina Hurricanes	82	36	31	15	33	215	236	−21	87
7	AT	Florida Panthers	82	35	36	11	30	210	237	−27	81
8	AT	Detroit Red Wings	82	33	36	13	24	207	244	−37	79
9	AT	Buffalo Sabres	82	33	37	12	31	201	237	−36	78
10	ME	New Jersey Devils	82	28	40	14	25	183	244	−61	70

Source: National Hockey League
x – Clinched playoff spot

== Schedule and results ==
=== Preseason ===
2016 preseason
Preseason: 4–2–2 (home: 3–0–1; road: 1–2–1)

Game	Date	Visitor	Score	Home	OT	Decision	Attendance	Record	Recap
1^{[a]}	September 26	Philadelphia	0–2	New Jersey		Lyon	7,415	0–1–0	L
2^{[a]}	September 26	Philadelphia	0–3	NY Islanders		Stolarz	––	0–2–0	L
3	September 27	NY Islanders	0–4	Philadelphia		Mason	17,721	1–2–0	W
4	September 28	New Jersey	0–2	Philadelphia^{[b]}		–	–	2–2–0	W
5	October 1	Boston	4–3	Philadelphia	SO	Neuvirth	17,920	2–2–1	OTL
6	October 3	NY Rangers	3–4	Philadelphia	OT	Mason	18,636	3–2–1	W
7	October 6	Philadelphia	4–2	NY Rangers		Neuvirth	18,200	4–2–1	W
8	October 8	Philadelphia	0–1	Boston	OT	Mason	17,202	4–2–2	OTL
Notes:^{a} Indicates split-squad game.^{b} Game was played at PPL Center in Allentown, Pennsylvania.

Legend: W Win (2 points) L Loss (0 points) OTL Overtime/shootout loss (1 point)

=== Regular season ===
2016–17 regular season
October: 4–5–1 (home: 2–3–0; road: 2–2–1)

Game	Date	Visitor	Score	Home	OT	Decision	Attendance	Record	Points	Recap
1	October 14	Philadelphia	4–2	Los Angeles		Neuvirth	18,453	1–0–0	2	W
2	October 15	Philadelphia	3–4	Arizona	OT	Mason	17,125	1–0–1	3	OTL
3	October 18	Philadelphia	4–7	Chicago		Mason	21,263	1–1–1	3	L
4	October 20	Anaheim	3–2	Philadelphia		Mason	19,982	1–2–1	3	L
5	October 22	Carolina	3–6	Philadelphia		Mason	19,668	2–2–1	5	W
6	October 24	Philadelphia	1–3	Montreal		Mason	21,288	2–3–1	5	L
7	October 25	Buffalo	3–4	Philadelphia	SO	Mason	19,209	3–3–1	7	W
8	October 27	Arizona	5–4	Philadelphia		Mason	19,432	3–4–1	7	L
9	October 29	Pittsburgh	5–4	Philadelphia		Neuvirth	19,927	3–5–1	7	L
10	October 30	Philadelphia	4–3	Carolina		Neuvirth	10,353	4–5–1	9	W

November: 7–5–2 (home: 5–2–2; road: 2–3–0)

Game	Date	Visitor	Score	Home	OT	Decision	Attendance	Record	Points	Recap
11	November 2	Detroit	3–4	Philadelphia	OT	Neuvirth	19,309	5–5–1	11	W
12	November 3	Philadelphia	3–2	NY Islanders	SO	Neuvirth	11,119	6–5–1	13	W
13	November 5	Philadelphia	4–5	Montreal		Neuvirth	21,288	6–6–1	13	L
14	November 8	Detroit	3–2	Philadelphia	SO	Mason	19,598	6–6–2	14	OTL
15	November 11	Philadelphia	3–6	Toronto		Mason	19,189	6–7–2	14	L
16	November 12	Minnesota	2–3	Philadelphia		Mason	19,591	7–7–2	16	W
17	November 15	Ottawa	3–2	Philadelphia	SO	Mason	19,358	7–7–3	17	OTL
18	November 17	Winnipeg	2–5	Philadelphia		Mason	19,432	8–7–3	19	W
19	November 19	Tampa Bay	3–0	Philadelphia		Mason	19,732	8–8–3	19	L
20	November 22	Philadelphia	3–1	Florida		Mason	15,515	9–8–3	21	W
21	November 23	Philadelphia	2–4	Tampa Bay		Mason	19,092	9–9–3	21	L
22	November 25	NY Rangers	3–2	Philadelphia		Mason	19,981	9–10–3	21	L
23	November 27	Calgary	3–5	Philadelphia		Stolarz	19,408	10–10–3	23	W
24	November 29	Boston	2–3	Philadelphia	SO	Mason	19,558	11–10–3	25	W

December: 9–4–1 (home: 5–0–1; road: 4–4–0)

Game	Date	Visitor	Score	Home	OT	Decision	Attendance	Record	Points	Recap
25	December 1	Philadelphia	3–2	Ottawa	OT	Mason	14,334	12–10–3	27	W
26	December 3	Chicago	1–3	Philadelphia		Mason	19,487	13–10–3	29	W
27	December 4	Philadelphia	4–2	Nashville		Mason	17,113	14–10–3	31	W
28	December 6	Florida	2–3	Philadelphia	OT	Mason	18,999	15–10–3	33	W
29	December 8	Edmonton	5–6	Philadelphia		Mason	19,346	16–10–3	35	W
30	December 10	Dallas	2–4	Philadelphia		Mason	19,594	17–10–3	37	W
31	December 11	Philadelphia	1–0	Detroit	OT	Stolarz	20,027	18–10–3	39	W
32	December 14	Philadelphia	4–3	Colorado		Mason	14,456	19–10–3	41	W
33	December 17	Philadelphia	1–3	Dallas		Mason	18,423	19–11–3	41	L
34	December 19	Nashville	2–1	Philadelphia	SO	Mason	19,660	19–11–4	42	OTL
35	December 21	Washington	2–3	Philadelphia	SO	Mason	20,011	20–11–4	44	W
36	December 22	Philadelphia	0–4	New Jersey		Mason	16,514	20–12–4	44	L
37	December 28	Philadelphia	3–6	St. Louis		Mason	19,409	20–13–4	44	L
38	December 30	Philadelphia	0–2	San Jose		Mason	17,562	20–14–4	44	L

January: 5–6–2 (home: 3–2–0; road: 2–4–2)

Game	Date	Visitor	Score	Home	OT	Decision	Attendance	Record	Points	Recap
39	January 1	Philadelphia	3–4	Anaheim	SO	Mason	17,174	20–14–5	45	OTL
40	January 4	NY Rangers	5–2	Philadelphia		Mason	19,858	20–15–5	45	L
41	January 7	Tampa Bay	2–4	Philadelphia		Neuvirth	19,810	21–15–5	47	W
42	January 8	Philadelphia	1–2	Columbus	OT	Mason	17,962	21–15–6	48	OTL
43	January 10	Philadelphia	1–4	Buffalo		Mason	18,920	21–16–6	48	L
44	January 12	Vancouver	4–5	Philadelphia	SO	Neuvirth	19,757	22–16–6	50	W
45	January 14	Philadelphia	3–6	Boston		Neuvirth	17,565	22–17–6	50	L
46	January 15	Philadelphia	0–5	Washington		Mason	18,506	22–18–6	50	L
47	January 21	New Jersey	4–1	Philadelphia		Neuvirth	19,932	22–19–6	50	L
48	January 22	Philadelphia	3–2	NY Islanders	OT	Mason	13,146	23–19–6	52	W
49	January 25	Philadelphia	2–0	NY Rangers		Mason	18,006	24–19–6	54	W
50	January 26	Toronto	1–2	Philadelphia		Neuvirth	19,723	25–19–6	56	W
January 27–29		All-Star Break in Los Angeles								
51	January 31	Philadelphia	1–5	Carolina		Mason	13,577	25–20–6	56	L

February: 4–6–1 (home: 3–3–1; road: 1–3–0)

Game	Date	Visitor	Score	Home	OT	Decision	Attendance	Record	Points	Recap
52	February 2	Montreal	1–3	Philadelphia		Neuvirth	19,768	26–20–6	58	W
53	February 4	Los Angeles	1–0	Philadelphia	OT	Neuvirth	19,833	26–20–7	59	OTL
54	February 6	St. Louis	2–0	Philadelphia		Neuvirth	19,589	26–21–7	59	L
55	February 9	NY Islanders	3–1	Philadelphia		Mason	19,737	26–22–7	59	L
56	February 11	San Jose	1–2	Philadelphia	OT	Neuvirth	19,910	27–22–7	61	W
57	February 15	Philadelphia	1–3	Calgary		Neuvirth	18,815	27–23–7	61	L
58	February 16	Philadelphia	3–6	Edmonton		Neuvirth	18,347	27–24–7	61	L
59	February 19	Philadelphia	3–2	Vancouver		Neuvirth	18,865	28–24–7	63	W
60	February 22	Washington	4–1	Philadelphia		Neuvirth	19,849	28–25–7	63	L
61	February 25	Philadelphia	2–4	Pittsburgh		Neuvirth	67,318 (outdoors)	28–26–7	63	L
62	February 28	Colorado	0–4	Philadelphia		Mason	19,564	29–26–7	65	W

March: 8–6–1 (home: 5–1–0; road: 3–5–1)

Game	Date	Visitor	Score	Home	OT	Decision	Attendance	Record	Points	Recap
63	March 2	Florida	1–2	Philadelphia	SO	Mason	19,650	30–26–7	67	W
64	March 4	Philadelphia	1–2	Washington	OT	Mason	18,506	30–26–8	68	OTL
65	March 7	Philadelphia	6–3	Buffalo		Mason	18,233	31–26–8	70	W
66	March 9	Philadelphia	2–4	Toronto		Neuvirth	18,894	31–27–8	70	L
67	March 11	Philadelphia	1–2	Boston		Mason	17,565	31–28–8	70	L
68	March 13	Columbus	5–3	Philadelphia		Mason	19,447	31–29–8	70	L
69	March 15	Pittsburgh	0–4	Philadelphia		Mason	19,514	32–29–8	72	W
70	March 16	Philadelphia	2–6	New Jersey		Mason	13,718	32–30–8	72	L
71	March 19	Carolina	3–4	Philadelphia	OT	Mason	19,517	33–30–8	74	W
72	March 21	Philadelphia	2–3	Winnipeg		Mason	15,294	33–31–8	74	L
73	March 23	Philadelphia	3–1	Minnesota		Mason	19,004	34–31–8	76	W
74	March 25	Philadelphia	0–1	Columbus		Neuvirth	19,052	34–32–8	76	L
75	March 26	Philadelphia	6–2	Pittsburgh		Mason	18,654	35–32–8	78	W
76	March 28	Ottawa	2–3	Philadelphia	SO	Mason	19,706	36–32–8	80	W
77	March 30	NY Islanders	3–6	Philadelphia		Mason	19,703	37–32–8	82	W

April: 2–1–2 (home: 2–0–1; road: 0–1–1)

Game	Date	Visitor	Score	Home	OT	Decision	Attendance	Record	Points	Recap
78	April 1	New Jersey	0–3	Philadelphia		Neuvirth	19,911	38–32–8	84	W
79	April 2	Philadelphia	3–4	NY Rangers		Stolarz	18,006	38–33–8	84	L
80	April 4	Philadelphia	0–1	New Jersey	OT	Mason	13,861	38–33–9	85	OTL
81	April 8	Columbus	2–4	Philadelphia		Mason	19,789	39–33–9	87	W
82	April 9	Carolina	4–3	Philadelphia	SO	Stolarz	19,559	39–33–10	88	OTL

Legend: W Win (2 points) L Loss (0 points) OTL Overtime/shootout loss (1 point)

== Player statistics ==
=== Scoring ===
- Position abbreviations: C = Center; D = Defense; G = Goaltender; LW = Left wing; RW = Right wing
- † = Joined team via a transaction (e.g., trade, waivers, signing) during the season. Stats reflect time with the Flyers only.
- ‡ = Left team via a transaction (e.g., trade, waivers, release) during the season. Stats reflect time with the Flyers only.

No.	Player	Pos	Regular season					
No.	Player	Pos	GP	G	A	Pts	+/-	PIM
93	Jakub Voracek	RW	82	20	41	61	−24	56
28	Claude Giroux	C	82	14	44	58	−15	38
10	Brayden Schenn	C	79	25	30	55	−13	38
17	Wayne Simmonds	RW	82	31	23	54	−18	122
53	Shayne Gostisbehere	D	76	7	32	39	−21	32
14	Sean Couturier	C	66	14	20	34	12	33
9	Ivan Provorov	D	82	6	24	30	−7	34
11	Travis Konecny	C	70	11	17	28	−2	49
3	Radko Gudas	D	67	6	17	23	8	93
32	Mark Streit‡	D	49	5	16	21	−10	22
24	Matt Read	RW	63	10	9	19	3	8
15	Michael Del Zotto	D	51	6	12	18	−5	28
47	Andrew MacDonald	D	73	2	16	18	−5	26
25	Nick Cousins	C	60	6	10	16	−6	31
22	Dale Weise	RW	64	8	7	15	1	39
76	Chris VandeVelde	C	81	6	9	15	−5	16
40	Jordan Weal	C	23	8	4	12	5	10
23	Brandon Manning	D	65	3	9	12	−12	83
12	Michael Raffl	LW	52	8	3	11	−7	20
51	Valtteri Filppula†	C	20	5	3	8	−2	2
78	Pierre-Edouard Bellemare	LW	82	4	4	8	−1	20
13	Roman Lyubimov	LW	47	4	2	6	−2	8
55	Nick Schultz	D	28	0	4	4	1	10
58	Taylor Leier	LW	10	1	1	2	−1	4
27	Boyd Gordon	C	13	1	0	1	−5	2
36	Colin McDonald	C	3	1	0	1	1	0
35	Steve Mason	G	58	0	1	1		0
48	Robert Hagg	D	1	0	0	0	0	0
21	Scott Laughton	C	2	0	0	0	0	0
50	Samuel Morin	D	1	0	0	0	0	0
30	Michal Neuvirth	G	28	0	0	0		2
41	Anthony Stolarz	G	7	0	0	0		0
74	Mike Vecchione†	RW	2	0	0	0	−1	0

=== Goaltending ===
No.	Player	Regular season										
No.	Player	GP	GS	W	L	OT	SA	GA	GAA	SV%	SO	TOI
35	Steve Mason	58	54	26	21	8	1556	143	2.66	.908	3	3225
30	Michal Neuvirth	28	24	11	11	1	586	64	2.82	.891	0	1364
41	Anthony Stolarz	7	4	2	1	1	181	13	2.07	.928	1	376

== Awards and records ==
=== Awards ===
Type	Award/honor	Recipient	Ref
League (in-season)	NHL All-Star Game selection	Wayne Simmonds (Note: Named All-Star Game Most Valuable Player)	
League (in-season)	NHL First Star of the Week	Steve Mason (December 5)	
League (in-season)	NHL First Star of the Week	Jakub Voracek (December 12)	
League (in-season)	NHL First Star of the Week	Wayne Simmonds (January 30)	
Team	Barry Ashbee Trophy	Ivan Provorov	
Team	Bobby Clarke Trophy	Wayne Simmonds	
Team	Gene Hart Memorial Award	Pierre-Edouard Bellemare	
Team	Pelle Lindbergh Memorial Trophy	Radko Gudas	
Team	Toyota Cup	Wayne Simmonds	
Team	Yanick Dupre Memorial Class Guy Award	Steve Mason	

=== Records ===
Among the team records set during the 2016–17 season was Brayden Schenn scoring three powerplay goals on December 10, tying a team record.

=== Milestones ===
Milestone	Player	Date	Ref
First game	Travis Konecny	October 14, 2016	
First game	Ivan Provorov	October 14, 2016	
First game	Roman Lyubimov	October 18, 2016	
First game	Anthony Stolarz	November 27, 2016	
First game	Samuel Morin	April 4, 2017	
First game	Mike Vecchione	April 4, 2017	
First game	Robert Hagg	April 9, 2017	

== Transactions ==
The Flyers were involved in the following transactions from June 13, 2016, the day after the deciding game of the 2016 Stanley Cup Finals, through June 11, 2017, the day of the deciding game of the 2017 Stanley Cup Finals.

=== Trades ===
Date	Details		Ref
June 24, 2016	To Winnipeg Jets: 1st-round pick in 2016; 3rd-round pick in 2016	To Philadelphia Flyers: Chicago's 1st-round pick in 2016; 2nd-round pick in 2016	
June 25, 2016	To New York Islanders: San Jose's 4th-round pick in 2016	To Philadelphia Flyers: 4th-round pick in 2017	
November 12, 2016	To New Jersey Devils: Petr Straka	To Philadelphia Flyers: Conditional 7th-round pick in 2017 or 2018 (Note: Condition not met. The Flyers would have received either a 2017 or 2018 draft pick if Straka played in at least 20 NHL games for the Devils.)	
March 1, 2017	To Tampa Bay Lightning: Mark Streit (Note: The Flyers retained 4.7% of Streit's cap hit and remaining salary.)	To Philadelphia Flyers: Valtteri Filppula; 4th-round pick in 2017; Conditional 7th-round pick in 2017 (Note: The Flyers would receive the pick if Tampa Bay traded Streit before the trading deadline. The condition was met a short time later when Tampa Bay traded Streit to the Pittsburgh Penguins.)	

=== Players acquired ===
Date	Player	Former team	Term	Via	Ref
July 1, 2016	Greg Carey	Springfield Falcons (AHL)	1-year	Free agency	
July 1, 2016	Boyd Gordon	Arizona Coyotes	1-year	Free agency	
July 1, 2016	Andy Miele	Detroit Red Wings	1-year	Free agency	
July 1, 2016	Will O'Neill	Pittsburgh Penguins	2-year	Free agency	
July 1, 2016	Dale Weise	Chicago Blackhawks	4-year	Free agency	
July 5, 2016	T. J. Brennan	Toronto Maple Leafs	2-year	Free agency	
July 11, 2016	Roman Lyubimov	CSKA Moscow (KHL)	1-year	Free agency	
March 31, 2017	Mike Vecchione	Union College (ECAC)	1-year	Free agency	

=== Players lost ===
Date	Player	New team	Via (Note: In parentheses is the player's free agency group on July 1 if applicable.)	Ref
June 14, 2016	Christian Marti	ZSC Lions (NLA)	Free agency	
June 16, 2016	R. J. Umberger (Note: Umberger was inactive during the 2016–17 season.)		Buyout	
June 17, 2016	Maxim Lamarche	Lehigh Valley Phantoms (AHL)	Free agency (UFA)	
July 1, 2016	Davis Drewiske (Note: Drewiske retired.)		Contract expiration (III)	
July 1, 2016	Ray Emery (Note: Emery retired.)		Contract expiration (III)	
July 1, 2016	Ryan White	Arizona Coyotes	Free agency (III)	
July 9, 2016	Evgeny Medvedev	Avangard Omsk (KHL)	Free agency (III)	
July 19, 2016	Jason LaBarbera		Retirement (III)	
July 29, 2016	Derek Mathers	Lehigh Valley Phantoms (AHL)	Free agency (UFA)	
August 1, 2016	Sam Gagner	Columbus Blue Jackets	Free agency (III)	
August 25, 2016	Brandon Alderson	Greenville Swamp Rabbits (ECHL)	Free agency (UFA)	
September 30, 2016	Aaron Palushaj	Cleveland Monsters (AHL)	Free agency (VI)	
May 2, 2017	Jesper Pettersson	Djurgardens IF (SHL)	Free agency	
May 3, 2017	Andy Miele	Malmo Redhawks (SHL)	Free agency	

=== Signings ===
Date	Player	Term	Contract type	Ref
June 23, 2016	Radko Gudas	4-year	Re-signing	
June 25, 2016	Mark Alt	1-year	Re-signing	
July 11, 2016	Jordan Weal	1-year	Re-signing	
July 14, 2016	Nick Cousins	1-year	Re-signing	
July 14, 2016	Pascal Laberge	3-year	Entry-level	
July 15, 2016	Petr Straka	1-year	Re-signing	
July 25, 2016	Brayden Schenn	4-year	Re-signing	
July 26, 2016	Brandon Manning	2-year	Re-signing	
October 2, 2016	Carter Hart	3-year	Entry-level	
March 1, 2017	Pierre-Edouard Bellemare	2-year	Extension	
March 1, 2017	Michal Neuvirth	2-year	Extension	
March 1, 2017	German Rubtsov	3-year	Entry-level	
March 8, 2017	Greg Carey	2-year	Extension	
March 21, 2017	Mark Friedman	3-year	Entry-level	
April 21, 2017	Connor Bunnaman	3-year	Entry-level	
April 27, 2017	Mikhail Vorobyev	3-year	Entry-level	
May 30, 2017	Oskar Lindblom	3-year	Entry-level	
June 9, 2017	Shayne Gostisbehere	6-year	Extension	

== Draft picks ==
Below are the Philadelphia Flyers' selections at the 2016 NHL entry draft, held on June 24–25, 2016 at the First Niagara Center in Buffalo, New York.

Round	Pick	Player	Position	Nationality	Team (league)	Notes
1	22	German Rubtsov	Center	Russia	Team Russia U18 (MHL)	(Note: The Philadelphia Flyers traded their first and third-round picks on June 24, 2016, to the Winnipeg Jets for Chicago's first-round pick and Winnipeg's second-round pick.)
2	36	Pascal Laberge	Center	Canada	Victoriaville Tigres (QMJHL)	
2	48	Carter Hart	Goaltender	Canada	Everett Silvertips (WHL)	
2	52	Wade Allison	Right wing	Canada	Tri-City Storm (USHL)	(Note: The Chicago Blackhawks' second-round pick will go to the Philadelphia Flyers as the result of a trade on February 27, 2015, that sent Kimmo Timonen to Chicago in exchange for a second-round pick in 2015 and this pick (being conditional at the time of the trade). The condition – Philadelphia will receive a second-round pick in 2016 if Chicago advances to the 2015 Stanley Cup Finals with Timonen playing in at least 50% of the Blackhawks' playoff games – was converted on May 30, 2015.)
3	82	Carsen Twarynski	Left wing	Canada	Calgary Hitmen (WHL)	(Note: The Los Angeles Kings' third-round pick will go to the Philadelphia Flyers as the result of a trade on January 6, 2016 that sent Vincent Lecavalier and Luke Schenn to Los Angeles in exchange for Jordan Weal and this pick.)
4	109	Connor Bunnaman	Center	Canada	Kitchener Rangers (OHL)	
5	139	Linus Hogberg	Defense	Sweden	Vaxjo Lakers (SWE Jr.)	
6	169	Tanner Laczynski	Center	United States	Lincoln Stars (USHL)	
6	172	Anthony Salinitri	Center	Canada	Sarnia Sting (OHL)	(Note: The Los Angeles Kings' sixth-round pick will go to the Philadelphia Flyers as the result of a trade on June 27, 2015 that sent Columbus' fourth-round pick in 2015 to Los Angeles in exchange for a fourth-round pick in 2015 and this pick.)
7	199	David Bernhardt	Defense	Sweden	Djurgardens IF (SWE Jr.)	
