= 2016–17 Tampa Bay Lightning season =

National Hockey League team season

2016–17 Tampa Bay Lightning
- Division: 5th Atlantic
- Conference: 10th Eastern
- 2016–17 record: 42–30–10
- Home record: 23–14–4
- Road record: 19–16–6
- Goals for: 234
- Goals against: 227

Team information
- General manager: Steve Yzerman
- Coach: Jon Cooper
- Captain: Steven Stamkos
- Alternate captains: Ryan Callahan; Ondrej Palat; Anton Stralman
- Arena: Amalie Arena
- Average attendance: 19,092 (100%)
- Minor league affiliates: Syracuse Crunch (AHL); Kalamazoo Wings (ECHL)

Team leaders
- Goals: Nikita Kucherov (40)
- Assists: Victor Hedman (56)
- Points: Nikita Kucherov (85)
- Penalty minutes: Cedric Paquette (80)
- Plus/minus: Nikita Kucherov (+13)
- Wins: Andrei Vasilevskiy (23)
- Goals against average: Ben Bishop (2.55)

The 2016–17 Tampa Bay Lightning season was the 25th season for the National Hockey League (NHL) franchise that was established on December 16, 1991. Despite earning 94 points, the Lightning failed to qualify for the 2017 Stanley Cup playoffs for the first time since the 2012–13 season, ending their three-season playoff streak. As of the 2025–26 season, this is the most recent season the Lightning missed the playoffs and the only time they have done so in a full season during Jon Cooper's coaching tenure.

== Off-season ==
=== May ===
On May 25, 2016, the Lightning signed a one-year affiliation agreement with the Kalamazoo Wings of the ECHL. Kalamazoo will serve as the Lightning's primary ECHL affiliate starting with the 2016–17 season. Since 2009, the K-Wings have produced 11 players who have appeared in the NHL, which includes four players who made their debuts during the 2015–16.

On May 28, 2016, the Lightning's off-season began when they were eliminated by the Pittsburgh Penguins in the Eastern Conference Final in a 2–1 loss. The Penguins would go on to capture the Stanley Cup after defeating the Lightning in a seven-game series.

=== June ===
On June 6, 2016, information came out that assistant coach Steve Thomas was not returning next season. The Lightning decided not to renew his contract with the club. Thomas had been on Cooper's staff since the 2013–14 season and with the organization since 2010, when he served as a player development coordinator (2010–12).

On June 7, 2016, the Lightning announced it had hired Todd Richards. Richards was brought in as a replacement for outgoing assistant coach Steve Thomas. Richards joins Tampa with more than 400 games of head coaching experience with the Minnesota Wild and Columbus Blue Jackets.

On June 14, 2016, the Lightning announced it had signed assistant coach Rick Bowness to a two-year contract extension. Bowness has been a member of the coaching staff since the 2013–14 season. Bowness is in charge of the defense and penalty kill, which ranked fifth in the NHL in 2015–16. Bowness also surpassed the 2,000-game mark last season. The Lightning also announced today its annual development cam will be held June 28–July 2 at the Brandon Ice Sports Forum. The camp will have some of the Lightning's top prospects competing on- and off-ice workouts, skating drills and will culminate with the annual three-on-three tournament. The team will release the full schedule and roster at a future date.

On June 21, 2016, the Lightning announced Ryan Callahan had surgery to repair a labral tear is his right hip. Callahan was expected to be out for at least five months. Callahan was dealing with the injury from the end of the 2015–16 regular season and throughout the playoffs as the Lightning advanced to the Eastern Conference Final. Callahan will also not be participating in the 2016 World Cup of Hockey in Toronto.

On June 24, 2016, the Lightning announced the re-signing of defenseman Luke Witkowski to a one-year, two-way contract. Witkowski played in four regular season games. Witkowski also made his Stanley Cup playoff debut, where he appeared in two games during the second round against the New York Islanders. Witkowski has played in 20 career NHL games, all with the Lightning over the past two seasons. He has also played in 199 career games in the American Hockey League (AHL), all with the Syracuse Crunch. The Lightning next announced it had signed J. T. Brown to a two-year contract extension. Brown played in 78 regular season games during the past season, recording 8 goals and 22 points. Brown was tied for third on the team with a +16 rating. Brown set career bests in games played, goals, points, plus/minus and penalty minutes last season. He also appeared in nine Stanley Cup playoff games, recording two assists and two penalty minutes. Brown has skated in 198 career NHL games, all with the Lightning over four seasons, registering 15 goals and 51 points. He also has skated in 37 playoff games, recording a goal and six points. In addition, the Lightning also announced the re-signing of Cedric Paquette to a two-year contract extension. Paquette appeared in 56 games with the team last season, registering 6 goals, 11 points and 51 penalty minutes. His 51 penalty minutes were good for fourth on the team during the regular season. He was also one of five Lightning players to score a shorthanded goal last season. Paquette also played in 17 Stanley Cup playoff games with the team, posting one assist and 24 penalty minutes. Paquette has played in 122 NHL games, all with the Lightning, over the past three seasons. During that span, he has recorded 18 goals and 31 points to go along with 102 penalty minutes.

On June 25, 2016, the Lightning traded Tony DeAngelo to the Arizona Coyotes during the 2016 NHL entry draft. The Lightning acquired the 37th overall pick as a result of the trade. The Lightning used the pick to select defenseman Libor Hajek, whom the team considered to be a first-round talent. DeAngelo struggled to adjust during his first professional season with Syracuse. He was a –18 and a healthy scratch eight times during the season. DeAngelo's father, Lou, declined to say if he had requested a trade.

On June 27, 2016, the Lightning made qualifying offers to most of its remaining restricted free agents. The players that received qualifying offers were C Alex Killorn, RW Nikita Kucherov, C Vladislav Namestnikov, G Kristers Gudlevskis, D Nikita Nesterov, LW Tye McGinn and LW Yanni Gourde. On the same day, the Lightning announced the schedule and roster for the team's annual development camp, which will be held from June 28 through July 2 at the Brandon Ice Sports Forum. In attendance will be nine of the team's 10 draft picks from the 2016 NHL entry draft. The roster includes highly touted prospects Adam Erne (2nd Round, 2013), Brayden Point (3rd Round, 2014), Mitchell Stephens (2nd Round, 2015), and Dominik Masin (2nd Round, 2014). Of those in attendance, 26 were selected in the draft, six are invitees and one player was acquired via trade. In addition, the Lightning announced the hiring of Jeff Halpern as a Syracuse Crunch assistant coach. Halpern previously served as the Crunch's player development coach during the 2015–16 season. Halpern is a veteran of 976 NHL games, including 126 with the Lightning from 2007 to 2010. Over his 14 seasons in the NHL, the centerman recorded 152 goals and 221 assists. Along with Tampa Bay, he spent time with the Washington Capitals, Dallas Stars, Los Angeles Kings, Montreal Canadiens and New York Rangers before finishing his career with the Phoenix Coyotes in 2014.

On June 28, 2016, the Lightning announced that it had re-signed forward Tye McGinn to a one-year, two-way contract. McGinn played in two games with the team last season. McGinn also appeared in 72 games with the Syracuse Crunch last season, scoring 20 goals and 44 points. He ranked third on the Crunch for points and goals. In addition, the Lightning announced the re-signing of Matt Taormina to a one-year, two-way contract. Taormina skated in three games with the Lighting last season. Taormina also skated in three Stanley Cup Playoff games in 2016. He also appeared in 61 games with the Crunch last season, recording 13 goals and 41 points. This ranked Taormina second among Crunch defensemen for points and led all defensemen for goals with 13.

On June 29, 2016, the Lightning announced that it had re-signed captain Steven Stamkos to an eight-year contract extension. Stamkos appeared in 77 regular season games with the team, recording 36 goals and 28 assists for 64 points. He ranked first in goals, third in assists and second in points. Stamkos is a four-time NHL All-Star. Stamkos has led the team in goals for six of the past seven seasons, which includes two seasons of 50 or more goals. Stamkos has won the Maurice "Rocket" Richard Trophy on two occasions, which included setting a new franchise record for goals in a single season (60), while also being the runner-up for it three other times. Stamkos ranks third on the franchise's all-time scoring list for goals (312) and points (562). Stamkos ranks second all-time for power play goals with 108. Stamkos also has eight career hat tricks, which is tied for first with Martin St. Louis in team history.

On June 30, 2016, the Lightning placed defenseman Matt Carle on unconditional waivers for the purpose of buying out the remainder of his contract. Carle was the Lightning's highest paid defenseman last season at $5.5 million, but he had a declining role. He was often a healthy scratch, which included game 7 of the Easter Conference Final. His buyout will save the team $3.67 million off the cap the next two seasons. The buyout will be spread over the next four seasons at $1.833 cap hit each season.

=== July ===
On July 1, 2016, the Lightning re-signed defenseman Victor Hedman to an eight-year contract extension. The deal was signed on the first day he was eligible for an extension, exactly one year from when he could have become an unrestricted free agent. Hedman will have a no-trade clause throughout the deal. Speaking on an extension Hedman said "For me, it was never a doubt. Staying in Tampa was my No. 1 priority."

The Lightning then announced the re-signing of goalie Andrei Vasilevskiy to a three-year contract extension. Vasilevskiy appeared in 24 games with the team last season, posting a record of 11–10–0 to go along with a 2.76 goals-against average and .910 save percentage. He also had one shutout in his second season with the team. He also played in eight Stanley Cup playoff games in 2016, recording a record of 3–4 to go along with a 2.76 goals–against average and .925 save percentage.

Next the Lightning announced the signing of free agent forward Michael Bournival to a one-year, two-way contract. Bournival played in 20 games with the St. John's IceCaps last season after suffering an injury. Bournival has spent his entire professional career in the Montreal Canadiens organization. He has skated in 89 career NHL games with Montreal, recording 10 goals and 19 points.

Soon after the Lightning announced the signing of free agent forward Gabriel Dumont to a one-year, two-way contract. Dumont appeared in 71 games with the St. John's IceCaps last season, notching 19 goals and 49 points. He was second on the team for goals and was third for points. Dumont has also played in 18 career NHL games, all with the Canadiens, recording a goal and three points.

Next the Lightning free agent forward Jeremy Morin to a one-year, two-way contract. He played in 59 AHL games last season with the Rockford IceHogs, Toronto Marlies and San Jose Barracuda. He registered 16 goals and 42 points. He has also played in 82 career NHL games with the Chicago Blackhawks and Columbus Blue Jackets, registering 10 goals and 22 points.

The Lightning announced the signing of free agent forward Pierre-Luc Letourneau-Leblond to a one-year, two-way contract today. Leblond played in 52 games with the Albany Devils last season, recording a goal and six points. His 131 penalty minutes led the team. He has played in 41 career NHL games with the New Jersey Devils, Calgary Flames and Pittsburgh Penguins, recording three assists and 101 penalty minutes.

The Lightning announced the final signing of the day, which was prospect Dennis Yan. Yan was signed to a three-year entry-level contract. Yan played in 62 games with the Shawinigan Cataractes last season, recording 32 goals and 69 points. He was third on the team for goals and was fourth for points. Yan also played in 20 playoff games and recorded 10 goals and 15 points.

On July 2, 2016, the Lightning announced the re-signing goaltender Kristers Gudlevskis to a one-year, two-way contract. Gudlevskis played in 41 games with the Syracuse Crunch last season, posting a 16–12–8 record with a 2.83 goals-against average and a .907 save percentage.

On July 5, 2016, Alex Killorn and Vladislav Namestnikov filed for arbitration. If an agreement is not reached between the team and both players, then it will result in arbitration. The hearings are scheduled from July 20 through August 4.

On July 9, 2016, the Lightning announced the signing of forward Mike Halmo to a one-year, two-way contract. Last season, Halmo played in 74 games with the Bridgeport Sound Tigers of the American Hockey League. He recorded 22 goals and 41 points. He was second on the Sound Tigers in goals and third in points. Halmo has also played in 20 career NHL games, all with the New York Islanders, recording one goal and 32 penalty minutes.

On July 13, 2016, the Lightning announced the signing of forward Cory Conacher to a one-year, one-way contract. Conacher played for SC Bern in the Swiss-A during the 2015-16 season, recording a team best 22 goals and 52 points. Conacher also registered five goals and nine points in 14 points while helping Bern win the Swiss-A League championship. Prior to playing for Bern, Conacher skated in 141 career NHL games with three different teams over three seasons, recording 19 goals and 58 points. His best NHL season came while playing for the Lightning during the 2012-13 season. He recorded nine goals and 24 points in 35 games. However, he was subsequently traded to the Ottawa Senators with a fourth-draft pick for goaltender Ben Bishop.

On July 17, 2016, the Lightning announced the extension of forward Alex Killorn to a seven-year, $31 million contract. Last season Killorn appeared in 81 games with the team, recording 14 goals and 40 points. Killorn also skated in 17 Stanley Cup Playoff games last year, where he scored five goals and 13 points. Killorn has spent his entire NHL career with the Lightning, scoring 53 goals and 138 points. Killorn's biggest impact has come during the playoffs, where he has recorded 33 points in 47 games.

On July 25, 2016, the Lightning announced the re-signing of Yanni Gourde to a one-year, two-way contract. Gourde appeared in two games last season, recording an assist and two penalty minutes. He also played in 65 games with the Syracuse Crunch, recording 14 goals and 44 points.

On July 26, 2016, the Lightning announced the re-signing of Vladislav Namestnikov to a two-year contract extension. By signing Namestnikov to a deal, the Lightning avoided Friday's scheduled arbitration hearing. Namestnikov had a career year last year, scoring 14 goals and 35 points in 80 games. He also skated in 17 playoff games, recording a goal and three points while helping the club reach the Eastern Conference Final.

=== August ===
On August 10, 2016, the Lightning signed veteran defenseman James Wisniewski to a professional tryout agreement. Wisniewski played just 47 seconds of one game last season with the Carolina Hurricanes last season before suffering a torn left ACL, which caused him to miss the entire season. If healthy, Wisniewski is a solid offensive defenseman. Wisniewski could be a decent depth option if he has a good camp, or he will serve as a veteran in camp while several members of the Lightning compete in the 2016 World Cup of Hockey.

On August 31, 2016, the Lightning announced their 24-man roster for the upcoming 2016 prospect tournament, which is being held at the Panthers IceDen in Coral Springs, Florida. The roster consists of primarily organizational draft picks, along with Daniel Walcott, acquired via trade, and two invitees. Of the 10 draft picks made in 2016, seven will take part in the tournament, including first round pick Brett Howden, and fellow forwards Boris Katchouk, Christopher Paquette, Taylor Raddysk, and Otto Somppi, as well as defenseman Libor Hajek and goaltender Conner Ingram. In addition, notable returning prospects taking part in the tournament are Adam Erne, Brayden Point, Dominik Masin, and Adam Wilcox. The tournament will run from September 17 through the 20th. The Florida Panthers, Nashville Predators and Washington Capitals will be the other teams participating in the tournament.

== Training camp ==
=== September ===
On September 15, 2016, the Lightning announced its training camp roster for the upcoming season. At the start of training camp, 12 players and head coach Jon Cooper will be away in Toronto participating in the 2016 World Cup of Hockey. Camp will officially open on Thursday, September 22 at Amalie Arena with testing. The first day on the ice for players is Friday September 23 at 8:30 a.m., with three practice groups named Lecavalier, St. Louis, and Richards. Most practices will be held at Amalie Arena and closed to the public. The exceptions are Fan Fest on September 25, October 3, 4 at Germain Arena in Estero, and October 10, 12 in Brandon. In addition to roster players and prospects, there will be 11 training camp invitees attending. The most notable of the group of invitees is veteran defenseman James Wisniewski. The other players are Alexandre Alain (Gatineau – QMJHL), Lane Scheidl (Kalamazoo – ECHL), Ryan Verbeek (Kingston – OHL), Adam Comrie (Reading – ECHL), Sean O'Rourke (Ferris State – WCHA, Kalamazoo – ECHL), Charlie Vasaturo (Kalamazoo – ECHL), Ben Wilson (Kalamazoo – ECHL), Mark Grametbauer (Blainville-Boisbriand – QMJHL), Joel Martin (Kalamazoo – ECHL), and Nicola Riopel (Rapid City – ECHL, Norfolk – ECHL).

On September 26, 2016, the Lightning announced the re-signing of Nikita Nesterov to a one-year contract worth $725,000. Nesterov appeared in 57 games this past season, recording three goals and nine points. He set career highs for games played, goals, assists, and points. He also appeared in nine 2016 Stanley Cup Playoff games, recording one assist and nine penalty minutes. Nesterov has appeared in 84 career NHL games over two seasons with the Lightning, recording five goals and 16 points. Nesterov has also appeared in 26 playoff games, recording a goal and seven points.

On September 28, 2016, the Lightning announced the reduction of their training camp roster by 22 players. Camp invitees Alexandre Alain, lane Scheidl, Ryan Verbeek, David Henley, Sean O'Rourke, Carlie Vasaturo, Ben Wilson, Mark Grametbauer, and Joel Martin were part of the initial roster cuts. Additionally, the majority of Lightning prospects eligible to return to junior hockey participating in training camp were returned to their respective teams. Some notable names from that group are Brett Howden, Mathieu Joseph, Dennis Yan, Libor Hajek, Matthew Spencer, and Conner Ingram. The Lightning also elected to send Bokondji Imama back to the Saint John Sea Dogs for an overage season in junior hockey. After the roster reduction, the Lightning now have 53 players remaining in their 2016 training camp.

=== October ===
On October 2, 2016, the Lightning announced the next round of roster reduction to their training camp roster. The lightning reduced their camp roster by 24 players, leaving 28 remaining as part of their 2016 training camp roster. Prospect Mitchell Stephens was return to his junior team, the Saginaw Spirit, as was Jonne Tammela to his junior team, the Peterborough Petes. The remaining players have been reassigned to the Syracuse Crunch of the American Hockey League, which is beginning their training camp on October 4, 2016. Several lightning prospects were part of this group, such as Adam Erne, Matthew Peca, Tanner Richard, Jake Dotchin, Dominik Masin, and Adam Wilcox. In addition, defenseman James Wisniewski was released from his tryout agreement as part of the roster reduction.

On October 5, 2016, the NHL announced that the preseason game between the Lightning and the Florida Panthers at the BB&T Center on Thursday was postponed Wednesday because of the expected landfall of Hurricane Matthew in South Florida. Executive chairman Peter Luukko stated through the Panther's website that "while we are disappointed to announce the postponement of any event at the BB&T Center, the safety of our fans, staff and the people of South Florida is always our top priority." The Lightning were to finish the preseason against the Nashville Predators at Amalie Arena on Saturday. No information has been give on a possible makeup date before the start of the regular season.

On October 6, 2016, the Lightning announced that it will be retiring the number 26 worn by the franchise's all-time leading scorer, Martin St. Louis. St. Louis becomes the first player in Lightning history to have their jersey retire. St. Louis was signed as a free agent by the Lightning as a free agent on July 31, 2000. He currently ranks first in team history for points (953), assists (588), short-handed goals (28), game winning goals (64), hat tricks (8 - tied with Steven Stamkos), and power play points (300). He also ranks second in goals scored with 365, behind Vincent Lecavalier's 383 goals, and also second for games played with 972. The ceremony will take place on Friday, January 13, 2017, when the Lightning host John Tortorella and the Columbus Blue Jackets at Amalie Arena.

Later that day, the Lightning announced that goaltender Kristers Gudlevskis had been assigned to their American Hockey League affiliate, the Syracuse Crunch. The Lightning now have 27 players remaining in the 2016 training camp.

On October 7, 2016, the Lightning placed defenseman Luke Witkowski and forward Gabriel Dumont on waivers. Both players will report to Syracuse if they clear waivers by noon the following day.

On October 10, 2016, the Lightning announced that veteran forward Erik Condra, along with Cory Conacher and Joel Vermin, were placed on waivers. Head coach Jon Cooper told the media to not read into the moves too much, and that it did not necessarily mean that all three players were being sent to Syracuse if they clear. There has been growing optimism from the team that restricted free agent wing Nikita Kucherov could be signed before Thursday's season opener which may require the team to free up salary cap. The three players being placed on waivers contains a salary cap component to it. Conacher's $575,000 would not count against the cap if he played in Syracuse, and only $300,000 of Condra's $1.25 million would count against the cap. It remains to be seen whether rookie forward Brayden Point makes the Lightning's opening night roster. The final roster has to be submitted to the NHL at 5:00 p.m. on Tuesday.

On October 11, 2016, the Lightning announced the re-signing of Nikita Kucherov to a three-year contract worth an average of $4.766 million per season. Kucherov skated in 77 games last season, recording 30 goals and 66 points. He led the team in points and was second in assists (36) and goals. Kucherov set career highs in goals, points, power-play goals (9) and game-winning goals (4). He ranked second in shots (209) and power-play goals, while also leading the team with 19 multi-point games. Last season Kucherov also appeared in 17 Stanley Cup Playoff games, recording 11 goals and 19 points. This led the team in both goals and points. Over the past two seasons he has scored 21 goals and 43 points in 43 playoff games. This is more playoff goals than any player over that period of time. In his career with the Lightning, Kucherov has skated in 211 games over three seasons, collecting 68 goals, 149 points, and a plus-50 rating.

On the same day, the Lightning announced that forwards Erik Condra, Cory Conacher, and Joel Vermin had been assigned to their AHL affiliate, the Syracuse Crunch. Additionally, the Lightning announced its regular season opening night roster. The surprise player in this group was twenty-year-old forward prospect Brayden Point. He had put in an impressive training camp, recording three preseason goals, and even earning the praise of Captain Steven Stamkos. Lightning General Manager, Steve Yzerman, stated that the team "felt like he's earned the right for us to give him a look right off the bat." Yzerman also noted that the decision to waive Conacher, Condra, and Vermin was partially based on salary cap constraints. The team carried 13 forwards including Ryan Callahan, who was still recovering from his June hip surgery and not yet cleared for contact. The forward group consisted of Steven Stamkos, Tyler Johnson, Ondrej Palat, Jonathan Drouin, Alex Killorn, Nikita Kucherov, Valtteri Filppula, Vladislav Namestnikov J.T. Brown, Cedric Paquette, Brian Boyle, Brayden Point, and Ryan Callahan. The defensemen were Victor Hedman, Anton Stralman, Andrej Sustr, Jason Garrison, Braydon Coburn, Nikita Nesterov, and Slater Koekkoek. The goalie tandem was the same as the previous season, which consisted of Ben Bishop and Andrei Vasilevskiy.

== Standings ==
Atlantic Division
Pos	Team	GP	W	L	OTL	ROW	GF	GA	GD	Pts
1	y – Montreal Canadiens	82	47	26	9	44	226	200	+26	103
2	x – Ottawa Senators	82	44	28	10	38	212	214	−2	98
3	x – Boston Bruins	82	44	31	7	42	234	212	+22	95
4	x – Toronto Maple Leafs	82	40	27	15	39	251	242	+9	95
5	Tampa Bay Lightning	82	42	30	10	38	234	227	+7	94
6	Florida Panthers	82	35	36	11	30	210	237	−27	81
7	Detroit Red Wings	82	33	36	13	24	207	244	−37	79
8	Buffalo Sabres	82	33	37	12	31	201	237	−36	78

Source: National Hockey League
x – Clinched playoff spot; y – Clinched division

Eastern Conference Wild Card
Pos	Div	Team	GP	W	L	OTL	ROW	GF	GA	GD	Pts
1	ME	x – New York Rangers	82	48	28	6	45	256	220	+36	102
2	AT	x – Toronto Maple Leafs	82	40	27	15	39	251	242	+9	95
3	ME	New York Islanders	82	41	29	12	39	241	242	−1	94
4	AT	Tampa Bay Lightning	82	42	30	10	38	234	227	+7	94
5	ME	Philadelphia Flyers	82	39	33	10	32	219	236	−17	88
6	ME	Carolina Hurricanes	82	36	31	15	33	215	236	−21	87
7	AT	Florida Panthers	82	35	36	11	30	210	237	−27	81
8	AT	Detroit Red Wings	82	33	36	13	24	207	244	−37	79
9	AT	Buffalo Sabres	82	33	37	12	31	201	237	−36	78
10	ME	New Jersey Devils	82	28	40	14	25	183	244	−61	70

Source: National Hockey League
x – Clinched playoff spot

== Schedule and results ==
=== Preseason ===
2016 Preseason game log: 3–2–0 (home: 2–1–0; road: 1–1–0)

Game	Date	Opponent	Score	OT	Decision	Location	Attendance	Record	Recap
1	September 27	Carolina Hurricanes	2–3		Wilcox	Amalie Arena	12,475	0–1–0	
2	September 29	Florida Panthers	2–0		Gudlevskis	Amalie Arena	12,491	1–1–0	
3	September 30	@ Carolina Hurricanes	2–1	OT	Vasilevskiy	PNC Arena	6,610	2–1–0	
4	October 1	@ Nashville Predators	3–4		Bishop	Bridgestone Arena	17,113	2–2–0	
5	October 6	@ Florida Panthers	Game canceled due to expected arrival of Hurricane Matthew.						
6	October 8	Nashville Predators	5–3		Vasilevskiy	Amalie Arena	17,095	3–2–0	

Lightning score listed first;

Win Loss Overtime/shootout loss

=== Regular season ===
2016–17 Regular season game log
October: 5–4–0, 10 Points (home: 3–1–0; road: 2–3–0)

Game	Date	Opponent	Score	OT	Decision	Location	Attendance	Record	Points	Recap
1	October 13	Detroit Red Wings	6–4		Bishop	Amalie Arena	19,092	1–0–0	2	
2	October 15	New Jersey Devils	3–2		Vasilevskiy	Amalie Arena	19,092	2–0–0	4	
3	October 18	Florida Panthers	4–3	SO	Bishop	Amalie Arena	19,092	3–0–0	6	
4	October 20	Colorado Avalanche	0–4		Bishop	Amalie Arena	19,092	3–1–0	6	
5	October 22	@ Ottawa Senators	4–1		Vasilevskiy	Canadian Tire Centre	15,918	4–1–0	8	
6	October 25	@ Toronto Maple Leafs	7–3		Bishop	Air Canada Centre	19,449	5–1–0	10	
7	October 27	@ Montreal Canadiens	1–3		Bishop	Bell Centre	21,288	5–2–0	10	
8	October 29	@ New Jersey Devils	1–3		Vasilevskiy	Prudential Center	13,098	5–3–0	10	
9	October 30	@ New York Rangers	1–6		Bishop	Madison Square Garden	18,006	5–4–0	10	

November: 8–6–1, 17 Points (home: 4–2–1; road: 4–4–0)

Game	Date	Opponent	Score	OT	Decision	Location	Attendance	Record	Points	Recap
10	November 1	@ New York Islanders	6–1		Bishop	Barclays Center	10,822	6–4–0	12	
11	November 3	Boston Bruins	3–4	SO	Vasilevskiy	Amalie Arena	19,092	6–4–1	13	
12	November 5	New Jersey Devils	4–1		Bishop	Amalie Arena	19,092	7–4–1	15	
13	November 7	@ Florida Panthers	1–3		Bishop	BB&T Center	11,703	7–5–1	15	
14	November 10	New York Islanders	4–1		Vasilevskiy	Amalie Arena	19,092	8–5–1	17	
15	November 12	San Jose Sharks	1–3		Bishop	Amalie Arena	19,092	8–6–1	17	
16	November 14	@ New York Islanders	4–0		Vasilevskiy	Barclays Center	12,498	9–6–1	19	
17	November 15	@ Detroit Red Wings	4–3		Bishop	Joe Louis Arena	20,027	10–6–1	21	
18	November 17	@ Buffalo Sabres	4–1		Bishop	First Niagara Center	17,870	11–6–1	23	
19	November 19	@ Philadelphia Flyers	3–0		Vasilevskiy	Wells Fargo Center	19,732	12–6–1	25	
20	November 21	@ Nashville Predators	1–3		Bishop	Bridgestone Arena	17,113	12–7–1	25	
21	November 23	Philadelphia Flyers	4–2		Vasilevskiy	Amalie Arena	19,092	13–7–1	27	
22	November 25	Columbus Blue Jackets	3–5		Bishop	Amalie Arena	19,092	13–8–1	27	
23	November 27	@ Boston Bruins	1–4		Bishop	TD Garden	17,565	13–9–1	27	
24	November 29	@ Columbus Blue Jackets	1–5		Vasilevskiy	Nationwide Arena	10,366	13–10–1	27	

December: 6–5–3, 15 Points (home: 5–2–1; road: 1–3–2)

Game	Date	Opponent	Score	OT	Decision	Location	Attendance	Record	Points	Recap
25	December 1	@ St. Louis Blues	4–5		Bishop	Scottrade Center	17,351	13–11–1	27	
26	December 3	Washington Capitals	2–1	SO	Bishop	Amalie Arena	19,092	14–11–1	29	
27	December 4	@ Carolina Hurricanes	0–1	OT	Bishop	PNC Arena	11,521	14–11–2	30	
28	December 8	Vancouver Canucks	1–5		Bishop	Amalie Arena	19,092	14–12–2	30	
29	December 10	Pittsburgh Penguins	3–4		Vasilevskiy	Amalie Arena	19,092	14–13–2	30	
30	December 14	@ Calgary Flames	6–3		Bishop	Scotiabank Saddledome	18,164	15–13–2	32	
31	December 16	@ Vancouver Canucks	2–4		Vasilevskiy	Rogers Arena	18,685	15–14–2	32	
32	December 17	@ Edmonton Oilers	2–3	SO	Bishop	Rogers Place	18,347	15–14–3	33	
33	December 20	Detroit Red Wings	4–1		Vasilevskiy	Amalie Arena	19,092	16–14–3	35	
34	December 22	St. Louis Blues	5–2		Vasilevskiy	Amalie Arena	19,092	17–14–3	37	
35	December 23	@ Washington Capitals	0–4		Vasilevskiy	Verizon Center	18,506	17–15–3	37	
36	December 28	Montreal Canadiens	4–3	OT	Vasilevskiy	Amalie Arena	19,092	18–15–3	39	
37	December 29	Toronto Maple Leafs	2–3	OT	Vasilevskiy	Amalie Arena	19,092	18–15–4	40	
38	December 31	Carolina Hurricanes	3–1		Vasilevskiy	Amalie Arena	19,092	19–15–4	42	

January: 3–8–2, 8 Points (home: 1–4–0; road: 2–4–2)

Game	Date	Opponent	Score	OT	Decision	Location	Attendance	Record	Points	Recap
39	January 3	Winnipeg Jets	4–6		Vasilevskiy	Amalie Arena	19,092	19–16–4	42	
40	January 5	Nashville Predators	1–6		Vasilevskiy	Amalie Arena	19,092	19–17–4	42	
41	January 7	@ Philadelphia Flyers	2–4		Vasilevskiy	Wells Fargo Center	19,810	19–18–4	42	
42	January 8	@ Pittsburgh Penguins	2–6		Vasilevskiy	PPG Paints Arena	18,633	19–19–4	42	
43	January 12	Buffalo Sabres	4–2		Bishop	Amalie Arena	19,092	20–19–4	44	
44	January 13	Columbus Blue Jackets	1–3		Vasilevskiy	Amalie Arena	19,092	20–20–4	44	
45	January 16	@ Los Angeles Kings	2–1		Bishop	Staples Center	18,230	21–20–4	46	
46	January 17	@ Anaheim Ducks	1–2	OT	Bishop	Honda Center	14,763	21–20–5	47	
47	January 19	@ San Jose Sharks	1–2		Vasilevskiy	SAP Center at San Jose	17,387	21–21–5	47	
48	January 21	@ Arizona Coyotes	3–5		Bishop	Gila River Arena	12,177	21–22–5	47	
49	January 24	@ Chicago Blackhawks	5–2		Vasilevskiy	United Center	21,617	22–22–5	49	
50	January 26	@ Florida Panthers	1–2	OT	Vasilevskiy	BB&T Center	14,248	22–22–6	50	
All-Star Break (January 27–January 30)
51	January 31	Boston Bruins	3–4		Bishop	Amalie Arena	19,092	22–23–6	50	

February: 6–2–2, 14 Points (home: 4–2–0; road: 2–0–2)

Game	Date	Opponent	Score	OT	Decision	Location	Attendance	Record	Points	Recap
52	February 2	Ottawa Senators	2–5		Vasilevskiy	Amalie Arena	19,092	22–24–6	50	
53	February 4	Anaheim Ducks	3–2	SO	Bishop	Amalie Arena	19,092	23–24–6	52	
54	February 7	Los Angeles Kings	5–0		Bishop	Amalie Arena	19,092	24–24–6	54	
55	February 10	@ Minnesota Wild	1–2	SO	Vasilevskiy	Xcel Energy Center	19,178	24–24–7	55	
56	February 11	@ Winnipeg Jets	4–1		Bishop	MTS Centre	15,294	25–24–7	57	
57	February 18	@ Dallas Stars	3–4	OT	Vasilevskiy	American Airlines Center	18,210	25–24–8	58	
58	February 19	@ Colorado Avalanche	3–2	OT	Bishop	Pepsi Center	17,270	26–24–8	60	
59	February 21	Edmonton Oilers	4–1		Bishop	Amalie Arena	19,092	27–24–8	62	
60	February 23	Calgary Flames	2–3		Vasilevskiy	Amalie Arena	19,092	27–25–8	62	
61	February 27	Ottawa Senators	5–1		Vasilevskiy	Amalie Arena	19,092	28–25–8	64	

March: 10–4–1, 21 Points (home: 5–3–1; road: 5–1–0)

Game	Date	Opponent	Score	OT	Decision	Location	Attendance	Record	Points	Recap
62	March 1	Carolina Hurricanes	4–3	OT	Vasilevskiy	Amalie Arena	19,092	29–25–8	66	
63	March 3	@ Pittsburgh Penguins	2–5		Budaj	PPG Paints Arena	18,640	29–26–8	66	
64	March 4	@ Buffalo Sabres	2–1	SO	Vasilevskiy	First Niagara Center	18,935	30–26–8	68	
65	March 6	New York Rangers	0–1	OT	Vasilevskiy	Amalie Arena	19,092	30–26–9	69	
66	March 9	Minnesota Wild	4–1		Vasilevskiy	Amalie Arena	19,092	31–26–9	71	
67	March 11	Florida Panthers	3–2		Vasilevskiy	Amalie Arena	19,092	32–26–9	73	
68	March 13	@ New York Rangers	3–2		Budaj	Madison Square Garden	18,006	33–26–9	75	
69	March 14	@ Ottawa Senators	2–1	OT	Vasilevskiy	Canadian Tire Centre	16,894	34–26–9	77	
70	March 16	Toronto Maple Leafs	0–5		Vasilevskiy	Amalie Arena	19,092	34–27–9	77	
71	March 18	Washington Capitals	3–5		Vasilevskiy	Amalie Arena	19,092	34–28–9	77	
72	March 21	Arizona Coyotes	3–5		Vasilevskiy	Amalie Arena	19,092	34–29–9	77	
73	March 23	@ Boston Bruins	6–3		Budaj	TD Garden	17,565	35–29–9	79	
74	March 24	@ Detroit Red Wings	2–1	OT	Vasilevskiy	Joe Louis Arena	20,027	36–29–9	81	
75	March 27	Chicago Blackhawks	5–4	OT	Vasilevskiy	Amalie Arena	19,092	37–29–9	83	
76	March 30	Detroit Red Wings	5–3		Vasilevskiy	Amalie Arena	19,092	38–29–9	85	

April: 4–1–1, 9 Points (home: 2–0–1; road: 2–1–0)

Game	Date	Opponent	Score	OT	Decision	Location	Attendance	Record	Points	Recap
77	April 1	Montreal Canadiens	1–2	OT	Vasilevskiy	Amalie Arena	19,092	38–29–10	86	
78	April 2	Dallas Stars	6–3		Budaj	Amalie Arena	19,092	39–29–10	88	
79	April 4	@ Boston Bruins	0–4		Vasilevskiy	TD Garden	17,565	39–30–10	88	
80	April 6	@ Toronto Maple Leafs	4–1		Vasilevskiy	Air Canada Centre	19,380	40–30–10	90	
81	April 7	@ Montreal Canadiens	4–2		Vasilevskiy	Bell Centre	21,288	41–30–10	92	
82	April 9	Buffalo Sabres	4–2		Vasilevskiy	Amalie Arena	19,092	42–30–10	94	

Lightning score listed first;

Win (2 points) Loss (0 points) Overtime/shootout loss (1 point)

== Player stats ==
Final

=== Skaters ===
Regular season
Player	GP	G	A	Pts	+/−	PIM
Nikita Kucherov	74	40	45	85	13	38
Victor Hedman	79	16	56	72	3	47
Jonathan Drouin	73	21	32	53	−13	16
Ondrej Palat	75	17	35	52	8	39
Tyler Johnson	66	19	26	45	−5	28
Brayden Point	68	18	22	40	4	14
Alex Killorn	81	19	17	36	−9	66
Valtteri Filppula^{‡}	59	7	27	34	1	24
Vladislav Namestnikov	74	10	18	28	−4	31
Brian Boyle^{‡}	54	13	9	22	5	48
Anton Stralman	73	5	17	22	1	20
Steven Stamkos	17	9	11	20	3	14
Andrej Sustr	80	3	11	14	−10	43
Braydon Coburn	80	5	7	12	−1	50
Nikita Nesterov^{‡}	35	3	9	12	−3	20
Jake Dotchin	35	0	11	11	10	35
Cedric Paquette	58	4	6	10	−6	80
Jason Garrison	70	1	8	9	−8	14
Yanni Gourde	20	6	2	8	−1	8
J. T. Brown	64	3	3	6	−7	73
Gabriel Dumont	39	2	2	4	1	29
Ryan Callahan	18	2	2	4	−4	23
Cory Conacher	11	1	3	4	0	4
Luke Witkowski	34	0	4	4	−1	39
Slater Koekkoek	29	0	4	4	−4	8
Adam Erne	26	3	0	3	−9	11
Michael Bournival	19	2	1	3	−3	2
Joel Vermin	18	0	3	3	2	4
Matthew Peca	10	1	1	2	−3	2
Greg McKegg^{†}	15	0	1	1	2	11
Erik Condra	13	0	0	0	−4	4
Byron Froese^{†}	4	0	0	0	−3	0
Tanner Richard	3	0	0	0	−2	2

- Most assists and points in a single season by a defenseman

=== Goaltenders ===
Regular season
Player	GP	GS	TOI	W	L	OT	GA	GAA	SA	SV%	SO	G	A	PIM
Andrei Vasilevskiy	50	47	2832	23	17	7	123	2.61	1480	.917	2	0	2	2
Ben Bishop^{‡}	32	31	1813	16	12	3	77	2.55	870	.911	1	0	0	8
Peter Budaj^{†}	7	4	279	3	1	0	13	2.80	128	.898	0	0	0	0
Kristers Gudlevskis	1	0	12	0	0	0	0	0.00	3	1.00	0	0	0	0

^{†}Denotes player spent time with another team before joining Tampa Bay. Stats reflect time with Tampa Bay only.
^{‡}Traded from Tampa Bay mid-season.
Bold/italics denotes franchise record

== Awards and honours ==
=== Awards ===
Regular season
Player	Award	Awarded
Nikita Kucherov	NHL First Star of the Week	November 7, 2016
Nikita Kucherov	NHL Second Star of November	December 1, 2016
Victor Hedman	NHL All-Star game selection	January 10, 2017
Nikita Kucherov	NHL All-Star game selection	January 10, 2017
Nikita Kucherov	NHL First Star of the Week	March 6, 2017
Nikita Kucherov	NHL First Star of the Week	March 27, 2017
Nikita Kucherov	NHL First Star of March	April 1, 2017
Brayden Point	NHL Third Star of the Week	April 10, 2017

=== Milestones ===
Regular season
Player	Milestone	Reached
Brayden Point	1st career NHL game	October 13, 2016
Braydon Coburn	700th career NHL game	October 15, 2016
J.T. Brown	200th career NHL game	October 15, 2016
Brayden Point	1st career NHL assist 1st career NHL point	October 15, 2016
Andrej Sustr	200th career NHL game	October 25, 2016
Victor Hedman	50th career NHL goal	October 25, 2016
Jonathan Drouin	100th career NHL game	October 30, 2016
Brayden Point	1st career NHL goal	November 5, 2016
Tyler Johnson	100th career NHL assist	November 15, 2016
Valtteri Filppula	400th career NHL point	November 17, 2016
Nikita Nesterov	100th career NHL game	November 23, 2016
Alex Killorn	300th career NHL game	December 8, 2016
Luke Witkowski	1st career NHL assist 1st career NHL point	December 8, 2016
Victor Hedman	500th career NHL game	December 15, 2016
Tanner Richard	1st career NHL game	December 20, 2016
Victor Hedman	200th career NHL assist	December 20, 2016
Matthew Peca	1st career NHL game	December 28, 2016
Andrei Vasilevskiy	1st career NHL assist 1st career NHL point	December 28, 2016
Nikita Kucherov	100th career NHL assist	December 29, 2016
Matthew Peca	1st career NHL assist 1st career NHL point	December 31, 2016
Adam Erne	1st career NHL game	January 3, 2017
Matthew Peca	1st career NHL goal	January 3, 2017
Jason Garrison	500th career NHL game	January 8, 2017
Michael Bournival	100th career NHL game	January 12, 2017
Jake Dotchin	1st career NHL game	January 21, 2017
Jake Dotchin	1st career NHL assist 1st career NHL point	January 31, 2017
Brian Boyle	600th career NHL game	February 18, 2017
Tyler Johnson	200th career NHL point	February 18, 2017
Nikita Kucherov	200th career NHL point	February 21, 2017
Anton Stralman	200th career NHL point	February 21, 2017
Anton Stralman	600th career NHL game	February 23, 2017
Tyler Johnson	300th career NHL game	February 23, 2017
Adam Erne	1st career NHL goal 1st career NHL point	March 3, 2017
Yanni Gourde	1st career NHL goal	March 11, 2017
Ondrej Palat	200th career NHL point	March 11, 2017
Nikita Kucherov	100th career NHL goal	March 18, 2017
Alex Killorn	100th career NHL assist	March 23, 2017
Ondrej Palat	300th career NHL game	March 27, 2017
Vladislav Namestnikov	200th career NHL game	April 7, 2017
Victor Hedman	300th career NHL point	April 9, 2017

== Transactions ==
The Lightning have been involved in the following transactions during the 2016–17 season.

=== Trades ===
Date	Details		Ref
June 25, 2016	To Arizona Coyotes Tony DeAngelo	To Tampa Bay Lightning ARI's 2nd-round pick in 2016
January 26, 2017	To Montreal Canadiens Nikita Nesterov	To Tampa Bay Lightning Jonathan Racine; 6th-round pick in 2017
February 25, 2017	To Arizona Coyotes Jeremy Morin	To Tampa Bay Lightning Stefan Fournier
February 26, 2017	To Los Angeles Kings Ben Bishop; 5th-round pick in 2017	To Tampa Bay Lightning Peter Budaj; Erik Cernak; 7th-round pick in 2017 conditional 2017 pick
February 27, 2017	To Toronto Maple Leafs Brian Boyle	To Tampa Bay Lightning Byron Froese conditional 2nd-round pick in 2017
March 1, 2017	To Florida Panthers Adam Wilcox	To Tampa Bay Lightning Mike McKenna
March 1, 2017	To Philadelphia Flyers Valtteri Filppula; 4th-round pick in 2017 conditional 7th-round pick in 2017	To Tampa Bay Lightning Mark Streit
March 1, 2017	To Pittsburgh Penguins Mark Streit	To Tampa Bay Lightning 4th-round pick in 2018
May 31, 2017	To Los Angeles Kings Bokondji Imama	To Tampa Bay Lightning Conditional 7th-round pick in 2018
June 15, 2017	To Montreal Canadiens Jonathan Drouin conditional 6th-round pick in 2018	To Tampa Bay Lightning Mikhail Sergachev conditional 2nd-round pick in 2018

=== Free agents acquired ===
Date	Player	Former team	Contract terms (in U.S. dollars)	Ref
July 1, 2016	Michael Bournival	St. John's IceCaps	1 year, $575,000	
July 1, 2016	Gabriel Dumont	St. John's IceCaps	1 year, $575,000	
July 1, 2016	Jeremy Morin	San Jose Barracuda	1 year, $575,000	
July 1, 2016	Pierre-Luc Letourneau-Leblond	Albany Devils	1 year, $575,000	
July 9, 2016	Mike Halmo	Bridgeport Sound Tigers	1 year, $575,000	
July 13, 2016	Cory Conacher	SC Bern	1 year, $575,000	

=== Free agents lost ===
Date	Player	New team	Contract terms (in U.S. dollars)	Ref
June 10, 2016	Jeff Tambellini	Djurgardens IF	Unknown	
July 1, 2016	Jonathan Marchessault	Florida Panthers	$1.5 million	
July 1, 2016	Mike Blunden	Ottawa Senators	$1.47 million	
July 27, 2016	Matt Carle	Nashville Predators	1 year, $700,000	
August 8, 2016	Mike Angelidis	Stockton Heat	Unknown	

=== Claimed via waivers ===
Player	Previous team	Date
Greg McKegg	Florida Panthers	February 27, 2017

=== Lost via waivers ===
Player	New team	Date

=== Player signings ===
Date	Player	Contract terms (in U.S. dollars)	Ref
June 24, 2016	Luke Witkowski	1 year, $632,500	
June 24, 2016	J. T. Brown	2 years, $2.5 million	
June 24, 2016	Cedric Paquette	2 years, $1.62 million	
June 28, 2016	Tye McGinn	1 year, $575,000	
June 28, 2016	Matt Taormina	1 year, $575,000	
June 29, 2016	Steven Stamkos	8 years, $68 million	
July 1, 2016	Victor Hedman	8 years, $63 million	
July 1, 2016	Andrei Vasilevskiy	3 years, $10.5 million	
July 1, 2016	Dennis Yan	3 years, $2.77 million	
July 2, 2016	Kristers Gudlevskis	1 year, $575,000	
July 17, 2016	Alex Killorn	7 years, $31 million	
July 25, 2016	Yanni Gourde	1 year, $575,000	
July 26, 2016	Vladislav Namestnikov	2 years, $3.875 million	
September 26, 2016	Nikita Nesterov	1 year, $725,000	
October 11, 2016	Nikita Kucherov	3 years, $14.3 million	
December 24, 2016	Mathieu Joseph	3 years, $2.77 million	
December 28, 2016	Brett Howden	3 years, $2.77 million	
March 21, 2017	Libor Hajek	3 years, $2.77 million	
April 4, 2017	Connor Ingram	3 years, $2.77 million	
April 23, 2017	Boris Katchouk	3 years, $2.77 million	
May 15, 2017	Taylor Raddysh	3 years, $2.77 million	

== Draft picks ==
Below are the Tampa Bay Lightning' selections at the 2016 NHL entry draft, held on June 24–25, 2016 at the First Niagara Center in Buffalo, New York.

Round	#	Player	Pos	Nationality	College/Junior/Club team (League)
1	27	Brett Howden	C	Canada	Moose Jaw Warriors (WHL)
2	37^{[a]}	Libor Hajek	D	Czech Republic	Saskatoon Blades (WHL)
2	44^{[b]}	Boris Katchouk	LW	Canada	Sault Ste. Marie Greyhounds (OHL)
2	58	Taylor Raddysh	RW	Canada	Erie Otters (OHL)
3	88	Connor Ingram	G	Canada	Kamloops Blazers (WHL)
4	118	Ross Colton	C	United States	Cedar Rapids RoughRiders (USHL)
5	148	Christopher Paquette	C	Canada	Niagara IceDogs (OHL)
6	178	Oleg Sosunov	D	Russia	Loko-Yunior Yarosla (MHL)
7	206^{[c]}	Otto Somppi	C	Finland	Halifax Mooseheads (QMJHL)
7	208	Ryan Lohin	C	United States	Waterloo Black Hawks (USHL)

Draft notes

- ^{[a]} The Arizona Coyotes' second-round pick went to the Tampa Bay Lightning as the result of a trade on June 25, 2016 that sent Tony DeAngelo to Arizona in exchange for this pick.
- ^{[b]} The Boston Bruins' second-round pick went to the Tampa Bay Lightning as the result of a trade on March 2, 2015 that sent Brett Connolly to Boston in exchange for a second-round pick in 2015 and this pick.
- ^{[c]} The Dallas Stars' seventh-round pick will go to the Tampa Bay Lightning as the result of a trade on June 27, 2015 that sent Anaheim's seventh-round pick in 2015 to Edmonton in exchange for this pick.

Edmonton previously acquired this pick as the result of a trade on July 5, 2013 that sent Shawn Horcoff to Dallas in exchange for Philip Larsen and this pick.
