= Dan Renouf =

Canadian ice hockey player

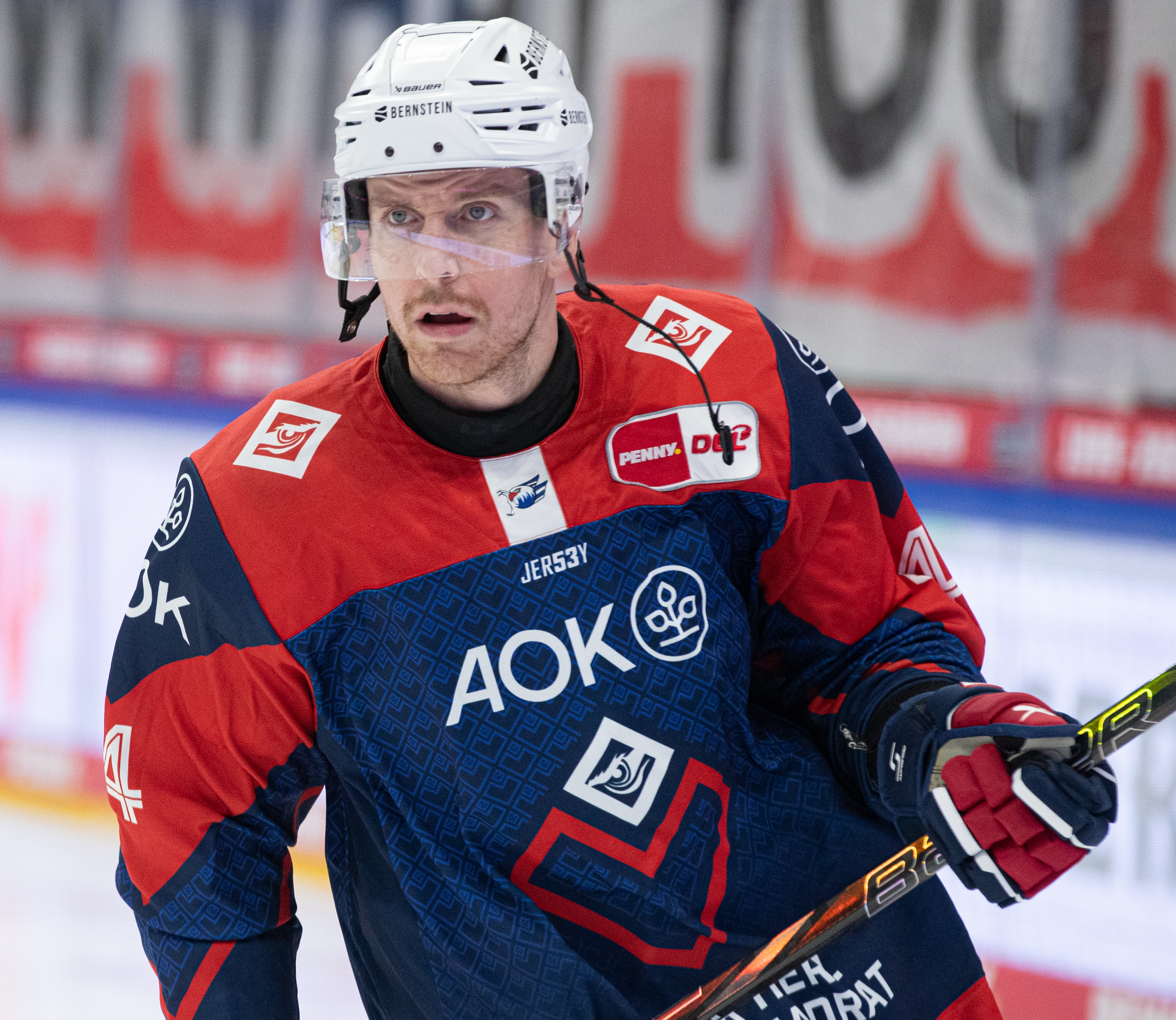
- Renouf with the Adler Mannheim in 2025
- Born: June 1, 1994 (age 32) Pickering, Ontario, Canada
- Height: 6 ft 3 in (191 cm)
- Weight: 209 lb (95 kg; 14 st 13 lb)
- Position: Defence
- Shoots: Left
- DEL team Former teams: Adler Mannheim; Detroit Red Wings; Colorado Avalanche; Boston Bruins
- NHL draft: Undrafted
- Playing career: 2016–present

Daniel Renouf (born June 1, 1994) is a Canadian professional ice hockey defenceman who is currently playing under contract with Adler Mannheim of the Deutsche Eishockey Liga (DEL).

== Playing career ==
=== Junior ===
Prior to his collegiate career, Renouf spent two seasons with the Youngstown Phantoms of the United States Hockey League (USHL). During the 2011–12 season, Renouf recorded one goal and 14 assists in 58 games, finishing second on the team in scoring by a defenceman. During the 2012–13 season, he recorded ten goals and 18 assists in 57 games, and helped lead the Phantoms to the Eastern Conference Finals, where they lost to eventual Clark Cup champions Dubuque Fighting Saints.

=== College ===
Renouf began his collegiate career for the Maine Black Bears during the 2013–14 season. Renouf appeared in 34 games during his freshman season, where he recorded one goal and 10 assists for 11 points, and ranked second on the team in scoring by a defenceman. During the 2014–15 season, Renouf appeared in all 39 games his sophomore season, where he recorded three goals and nine assists. During the 2015–16 season, he recorded six goals and nine assists in 38 games, and led the team in scoring by a defenceman.

=== Professional ===
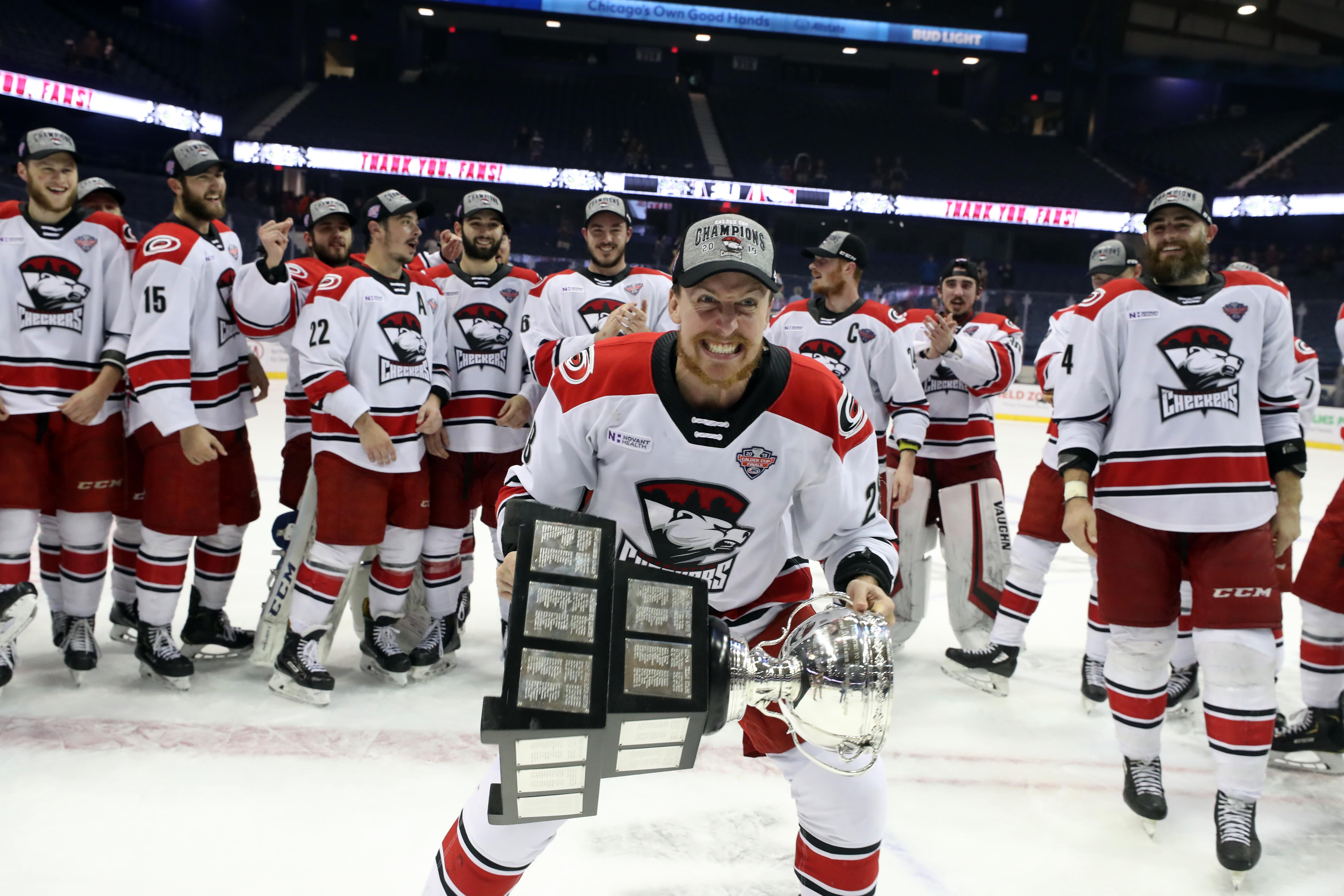
Renouf celebrating the Calder Cup with the Checkers in 2019.

On March 10, 2016, Renouf was signed to a two-year, entry-level contract by the Detroit Red Wings. Following the conclusion of his collegiate career, Renouf joined the Grand Rapids Griffins during the 2015–16 season, where he recorded one assist in six games.

On March 26, 2017, Renouf was recalled by the Red Wings. Prior to being recalled, Renouf recorded three goals and 12 assists in 58 games with the Griffins. He made his NHL debut for the Red Wings the following night in a game against the Carolina Hurricanes, where he recorded one shot on goal and three hits in 13:35 time on ice. On March 28, he was returned to the Griffins.

At the conclusion of his entry-level contract, Renouf was not tendered a qualifying offer by the Red Wings, allowing him to depart as a free agent. On July 2, 2018, Renouf signed a one-year, two-way contract with the Carolina Hurricanes. After attending the Hurricanes training camp, Renouf was assigned for the duration of the 2018–19 season to the AHL to play with affiliate, the Charlotte Checkers. Used in a top-four role on the blueline, Renouf added 2 goals and 22 points in 74 regular season games for the league's best Checkers. He added 3 points in 12 playoff games to help Charlotte claim the Calder Cup, his second AHL championship in two years.

On July 1, 2019, the Colorado Avalanche signed Renouf to a two-year, two-way $1.4 million contract.

On July 29, 2021, Renouf returned to his original club, the Detroit Red Wings, by agreeing to a one-year, two-way contract.

On July 13, 2022, Renouf signed a two-year, two-way contract with the Boston Bruins.

At the conclusion of his contract with the Bruins, Renouf left as a free agent and was signed to a one-year AHL contract with the Wilkes-Barre/Scranton Penguins, affiliate to the Pittsburgh Penguins, for the 2024–25 season on July 8, 2024.

Following his tenth professional North American season, Renouf as a free agent opted to continue his career abroad by signing a one-year contract with German club, Adler Mannheim of the DEL, on June 19, 2025.

== Career statistics ==
			Regular season					Playoffs
Season	Team	League	GP	G	A	Pts	PIM	GP	G	A	Pts	PIM
2009–10	Whitby Fury	OJHL	2	0	0	0	0	—	—	—	—	—
2011–12	Youngstown Phantoms	USHL	58	1	14	15	53	6	0	2	2	4
2012–13	Youngstown Phantoms	USHL	57	10	18	28	83	9	0	1	1	7
2013–14	University of Maine	HE	34	1	10	11	12	—	—	—	—	—
2014–15	University of Maine	HE	39	3	9	12	24	—	—	—	—	—
2015–16	University of Maine	HE	38	6	9	15	36	—	—	—	—	—
2015–16	Grand Rapids Griffins	AHL	6	0	1	1	5	—	—	—	—	—
2016–17	Grand Rapids Griffins	AHL	67	3	13	16	95	19	2	2	4	6
2016–17	Detroit Red Wings	NHL	1	0	0	0	0	—	—	—	—	—
2017–18	Grand Rapids Griffins	AHL	73	2	10	12	83	5	0	1	1	19
2018–19	Charlotte Checkers	AHL	74	2	22	24	121	12	1	2	3	23
2019–20	Colorado Eagles	AHL	54	2	14	16	82	—	—	—	—	—
2020–21	Colorado Avalanche	NHL	18	0	3	3	16	—	—	—	—	—
2020–21	Colorado Eagles	AHL	5	1	2	3	4	—	—	—	—	—
2021–22	Grand Rapids Griffins	AHL	63	3	11	14	53	—	—	—	—	—
2021–22	Detroit Red Wings	NHL	4	0	0	0	7	—	—	—	—	—
2022–23	Providence Bruins	AHL	54	1	10	11	57	2	0	0	0	0
2022–23	Boston Bruins	NHL	1	0	0	0	0	—	—	—	—	—
2023–24	Providence Bruins	AHL	63	5	16	21	77	4	0	0	0	2
2024–25	Wilkes-Barre/Scranton Penguins	AHL	51	2	12	14	94	1	0	0	0	0
2025–26	Adler Mannheim	DEL	51	2	13	15	49	15	0	2	2	36
NHL totals			24	0	3	3	23	—	—	—	—	—

== Awards and honours ==
Award	Year
AHL
Calder Cup (Grand Rapids Griffins)	2017
Calder Cup (Charlotte Checkers)	2019
