= 2016–17 Ottawa Senators season =

Season of professional ice hockey team

2016–17 Ottawa Senators
- Division: 2nd Atlantic
- Conference: 6th Eastern
- 2016–17 record: 44–28–10
- Home record: 22–11–8
- Road record: 22–17–2
- Goals for: 212
- Goals against: 214

Team information
- General manager: Pierre Dorion
- Coach: Guy Boucher
- Captain: Erik Karlsson
- Alternate captains: Chris Neil; Dion Phaneuf; Kyle Turris
- Arena: Canadian Tire Centre
- Average attendance: 16,744
- Minor league affiliates: Binghamton Senators (AHL); Wichita Thunder (ECHL)

Team leaders
- Goals: Kyle Turris (27)
- Assists: Erik Karlsson (54)
- Points: Erik Karlsson (71)
- Penalty minutes: Mark Borowiecki (154)
- Plus/minus: Mike Hoffman (+17)
- Wins: Craig Anderson (25)
- Goals against average: Craig Anderson (2.28)

The 2016–17 Ottawa Senators season was the 25th season of the Ottawa Senators of the National Hockey League (NHL). After failing to make the 2016 Stanley Cup playoffs, the Senators replaced their management and coaching staff, promoting Pierre Dorion to general manager, and hiring Guy Boucher and Marc Crawford and assistants to coach the team. The team would defy the predictions of much of the media by qualifying for the 2017 playoffs, and then by winning two rounds in the playoffs before losing in double overtime in game seven of the Eastern Conference Final to the eventual Stanley Cup champion Pittsburgh Penguins.

As of 2026, this is the only time in the post-Daniel Alfredsson era where the Senators have come close to playing in the Stanley Cup Finals. It would have been their first appearance in the Finals since 2007. Coincidentally, they were close to a rematch with the Anaheim Ducks, whom they lost to in the 2007 Finals. This would be the last time until 2025 that the Senators qualified for the playoffs.

The season was notable for off-ice issues. Despite the success of the team, attendance at Canadian Tire Centre dropped during the regular season, to the lowest average gate by the team in 20 seasons. The team fired its head of marketing early in the season. The team also replaced its president, co-founder Cyril Leeder, with Tom Anselmi in January 2017.

== Off-season ==
On April 10, 2016, the day after the final game of the 2015–16 season, general manager Bryan Murray announced his resignation as manager and that he would continue in an advisory role with the club. Assistant general manager Pierre Dorion was elevated to the general manager position. On April 12, the Senators fired head coach Dave Cameron. On May 8, the Senators hired former Tampa Bay Lightning head coach Guy Boucher as their new head coach. On the following day, Marc Crawford was announced as associate coach. On June 15, the Senators hired Rob Cookson as an assistant coach. Cookson had spent the last four seasons as an assistant to Crawford with ZSC Lions of Switzerland's National League A, with whom he contributed to the team's championship in the 2013–14 season. Prior to this, he was a member of the Calgary Flames coaching staff for 11 seasons from the 2000–01 to 2010–11 seasons.

The Senators announced the retirement of the #11 jersey of former team captain Daniel Alfredsson. The ceremony took place on December 29, prior to the Senators' home game against the Detroit Red Wings. This is the second jersey to be retired by the current Senators franchise since they came back into the league. The first jersey retirement ceremony the club held was for the late Frank Finnigan of the original Ottawa Senators, who had his #8 jersey retired prior to the current franchise's inaugural game on October 8, 1992, against the Montreal Canadiens.

The Senators changed their ECHL affiliate after their former affiliate, the Evansville IceMen, went dormant for the season due to arena lease issues. On July 14, 2016, the Senators announced an affiliation agreement with the Wichita Thunder. On September 26, the Senators announced that they would move their American Hockey League (AHL) affiliate Binghamton Senators to Belleville, Ontario, for the 2017–18 season. The club was renamed the Belleville Senators.

== Preseason ==
The Senators played a seven-game pre-season schedule. The schedule included two home games against the Montreal Canadiens and Buffalo Sabres, three road games against the Montreal Canadiens, Buffalo Sabres, and Winnipeg Jets, and two neutral-site games against the Toronto Maple Leafs with one taking place in Halifax, Nova Scotia and the other in Saskatoon, Saskatchewan.

== Regular season ==
The Senators opened the regular season at home on Wednesday, October 12 against their provincial rivals, the Toronto Maple Leafs. The first away game of their schedule was Monday, October 17 in Detroit against the Red Wings. They concluded their home schedule on Saturday, April 8 against the New York Rangers. Their last regular season game took place a day later in Brooklyn, New York against the Islanders.

On December 29, 2016, before a game against the Detroit Red Wings, the Senators retired the #11 jersey of former player Daniel Alfredsson. On January 24, 2017, the Senators honoured Bryan Murray as the first member of their "Ring of Honour" at the Canadian Tire Centre, before a game against the Washington Capitals. On January 25, 2017, the Senators announced a new team president Tom Anselmi, replacing founder Cyril Leeder who steps down as president of the team.

On March 17, 2017, the NHL announced that an outdoor game would be played at the TD Place Stadium in Ottawa on December 16, 2017. Known as the NHL 100 Classic, it is a regular-season game for the Senators and the Montreal Canadiens. This will commemorate the first NHL game, held in Ottawa on December 19, 1917, between the Senators and Canadiens. It is one of the events to commemorate the 100-year anniversary of the NHL and the 150-year anniversary of the founding of Canada. According to NHL president Gary Bettman: "To launch our next 100 years, we believe it is only right to bring the Canadiens and the Senators back together."

The attendance at home games dropped in 2016-17 according to ESPN. The Senators drew an average of 16,744 per game for a total of 686,534 for the season. This was 87% of capacity. In 2015–16, the Senators drew an average of 18,084 per game. The drop in attendance was noticed by the media, especially after games in the playoffs did not sell out. The drop, which was the third-largest in the league in the last ten years, was attributed to various factors, including a payroll systems issue for Government of Canada employees, lack of support for francophone fans, grumbling about the owner, and other factors. Early in the season, the club fired persons in its marketing department, which led to at least one lawsuit.

== Playoffs ==
On April 6, the Ottawa Senators qualified for the 2017 playoffs with a 2–1 shootout win over the Boston Bruins. On April 8, the Ottawa Senators clinched home-ice advantage in the first round for the first time since 2007 after a 3–1 victory over the New York Rangers.

The Senators played the Boston Bruins in the first round. This was the first Ottawa–Boston series since the 1927 Stanley Cup Finals, the first for the contemporary Ottawa franchise versus the Bruins. The Senators defeated the Bruins four games to two and moved on to the second round.

The Senators faced the New York Rangers in the second round. This was the second postseason meeting in the last five years between the two teams. The Rangers won the previous series, 4 games to 3, back in 2012. The Senators defeated the Rangers four games to two and advanced to the Eastern Conference Final. It marked the third time in franchise history that the Senators made it to the third round, and the first time since 2007, when they advanced to the Stanley Cup Finals after defeating the Buffalo Sabres in five games.

In the conference final, the Senators took on the Pittsburgh Penguins. This marked the fourth time that the two teams met in a postseason series, with the Penguins taking three out of the four matchups. The Ottawa Senators are only the second Canadian team to advance to the Conference Final in three different seasons in the last 20 years. The Senators would fall in seven games to the Penguins, with the seventh game being decided in double overtime. The Penguins would go on to defeat the Nashville Predators to win the Stanley Cup.

== Standings ==
Atlantic Division
Pos	Team	GP	W	L	OTL	ROW	GF	GA	GD	Pts
1	y – Montreal Canadiens	82	47	26	9	44	226	200	+26	103
2	x – Ottawa Senators	82	44	28	10	38	212	214	−2	98
3	x – Boston Bruins	82	44	31	7	42	234	212	+22	95
4	x – Toronto Maple Leafs	82	40	27	15	39	251	242	+9	95
5	Tampa Bay Lightning	82	42	30	10	38	234	227	+7	94
6	Florida Panthers	82	35	36	11	30	210	237	−27	81
7	Detroit Red Wings	82	33	36	13	24	207	244	−37	79
8	Buffalo Sabres	82	33	37	12	31	201	237	−36	78

Source: National Hockey League
x – Clinched playoff spot; y – Clinched division

== Schedule and results ==
=== Preseason ===
2016 Pre-season Game Log: 3–2–2 (Home: 1–1–1; Road: 2–1–1)
#	Date	Visitor	Score	Home	OT	Decision	Attendance	Record	Recap
1	September 26	Ottawa	6–3	Toronto (in Halifax, NS)		–	–	1–0–0
2	September 27	Ottawa	2–3	Buffalo	OT	O'Connor	17,868	1–0–1
3	September 29	Ottawa	4–3	Montreal	OT	O'Connor	21,288	2–0–1
4	October 1	Montreal	3–2	Ottawa	OT	Hammond	17,147	2–0–2
5	October 3	Ottawa	2–4	Winnipeg		Hammond	15,294	2–1–2
6	October 4	Toronto	2–3	Ottawa (in Saskatoon, SK)	OT	–	–	3–1–2
7	October 7	Buffalo	4–2	Ottawa		Anderson	14,216	3–2–2

=== Regular season ===
2016–17 Game Log (Record: 44–28–10; Home: 22–11–8 Road: 22–17–2)

October: 5–3–0 (Home: 3–1–0; Road: 2–2–0)
#	Date	Visitor	Score	Home	OT	Decision	Attendance	Record	Pts	Recap
1	October 12	Toronto	4–5	Ottawa	OT	Anderson	17,618	1–0–0	2
2	October 15	Montreal	3–4	Ottawa	SO	Anderson	18,195	2–0–0	4
3	October 17	Ottawa	1–5	Detroit		Hammond	20,027	2–1–0	4
4	October 18	Arizona	4–7	Ottawa		Anderson	11,061	3–1–0	6
5	October 22	Tampa Bay	4–1	Ottawa		Anderson	15,918	3–2–0	6
6	October 25	Ottawa	3–0	Vancouver		Anderson	18,471	4–2–0	8
7	October 28	Ottawa	2–5	Calgary		Driedger	18,132	4–3–0	8
8	October 30	Ottawa	2–0	Edmonton		Anderson	18,347	5–3–0	10

November: 9–5–1 (Home: 5–4–1; Road: 4–1–0)
#	Date	Visitor	Score	Home	OT	Decision	Attendance	Record	Pts	Recap
9	November 1	Carolina	1–2	Ottawa	OT	Anderson	13,049	6–3–0	12
10	November 3	Vancouver	0–1	Ottawa		Condon	13,260	7–3–0	14
11	November 5	Buffalo	2–1	Ottawa		Anderson	16,225	7–4–0	14
12	November 8	Ottawa	1–3	Nashville		Anderson	17,113	7–5–0	14
13	November 9	Ottawa	2–1	Buffalo	SO	Condon	17,884	8–5–0	16
14	November 11	Los Angeles	1–2	Ottawa		Anderson	15,622	9–5–0	18
15	November 13	Minnesota	2–1	Ottawa	OT	Anderson	14,265	9–5–1	19
16	November 15	Ottawa	3–2	Philadelphia	SO	Anderson	19,358	10–5–1	21
17	November 17	Nashville	5–1	Ottawa		Condon	15,480	10–6–1	21
18	November 19	Florida	4–1	Ottawa		Anderson	14,132	10–7–1	21
19	November 22	Ottawa	4–3	Montreal		Anderson	21,288	11–7–1	23
20	November 24	Boston	1–3	Ottawa		Anderson	17,191	12–7–1	25
21	November 26	Carolina	1–2	Ottawa		Anderson	18,042	13–7–1	27
22	November 27	Ottawa	2–0	NY Rangers		Anderson	18,006	14–7–1	29
23	November 29	Buffalo	5–4	Ottawa		Anderson	14,259	14–8–1	29

December: 6–4–3 (Home: 3–0–3; Road: 3–4–0)
#	Date	Visitor	Score	Home	OT	Decision	Attendance	Record	Pts	Recap
24	December 1	Philadelphia	3–2	Ottawa	OT	Condon	14,434	14–8–2	30
25	December 3	Florida	0–2	Ottawa		Condon	15,149	15–8–2	32
26	December 5	Ottawa	5–8	Pittsburgh		Anderson	18,414	15–9–2	32
27	December 7	Ottawa	4–2	San Jose		Condon	17,349	16–9–2	34
28	December 10	Ottawa	1–4	Los Angeles		Condon	18,230	16–10–2	34
29	December 11	Ottawa	1–5	Anaheim		Condon	15,714	16–11–2	34
30	December 14	San Jose	4–3	Ottawa	SO	Condon	17,273	16–11–3	35
31	December 17	New Jersey	1–3	Ottawa		Condon	15,111	17–11–3	37
32	December 18	Ottawa	6–2	NY Islanders		Condon	13,102	18–11–3	39
33	December 20	Ottawa	4–3	Chicago		Condon	21,614	19–11–3	41
34	December 22	Anaheim	1–2	Ottawa	OT	Condon	17,125	20–11–3	43
35	December 27	Ottawa	3–4	NY Rangers		Condon	18,006	20–12–3	43
36	December 29	Detroit	3–2	Ottawa	OT	Condon	20,011	20–12–4	44

January: 6–4–2 (Home: 3–2–2; Road: 3–2–0)
#	Date	Visitor	Score	Home	OT	Decision	Attendance	Record	Pts	Recap
37	January 1	Ottawa	1–2	Washington		Condon	18,506	20–13–4	44
38	January 7	Washington	1–0	Ottawa		Condon	18,696	20–14–4	44
39	January 8	Edmonton	3–5	Ottawa		Condon	17,724	21–14–4	46
40	January 12	Pittsburgh	1–4	Ottawa		Condon	17,769	22–14–4	48
41	January 14	Toronto	4–2	Ottawa		Condon	19,782	22–15–4	48
42	January 17	Ottawa	6–4	St. Louis		Condon	18,922	23–15–4	50
43	January 19	Ottawa	2–0	Columbus		Condon	15,823	24–15–4	52
44	January 21	Ottawa	3–2	Toronto	SO	Condon	19,544	25–15–4	54
45	January 22	Columbus	7–6	Ottawa	OT	Condon	16,702	25–15–5	55
46	January 24	Washington	0–3	Ottawa		Condon	16,683	26–15–5	57
47	January 26	Calgary	3–2	Ottawa	OT	Condon	16,263	26–15–6	58
January 27–29		All-Star Break in Los Angeles
48	January 31	Ottawa	5–6	Florida		Condon	11,933	26–16–6	58

February: 7–6–0 (Home: 2–3–0; Road: 5–3–0)
#	Date	Visitor	Score	Home	OT	Decision	Attendance	Record	Pts	Recap
49	February 2	Ottawa	5–2	Tampa Bay		Condon	19,092	27–16–6	60
50	February 4	Ottawa	0–4	Buffalo		Condon	19,070	27–17–6	60
51	February 7	St. Louis	6–0	Ottawa		Hammond	16,787	27–18–6	60
52	February 9	Dallas	2–3	Ottawa		Condon	17,676	28–18–6	62
53	February 11	NY Islanders	0–3	Ottawa		Anderson	18,211	29–18–6	64
54	February 14	Buffalo	3–2	Ottawa		Anderson	16,832	29–19–6	64
55	February 16	Ottawa	3–0	New Jersey		Condon	13,908	30–19–6	66
56	February 18	Ottawa	6–3	Toronto		Anderson	19,527	31–19–6	68
57	February 19	Winnipeg	3–2	Ottawa		Condon	19,288	31–20–6	68
58	February 21	Ottawa	2–1	New Jersey		Anderson	12,343	32–20–6	70
59	February 24	Ottawa	0–3	Carolina		Anderson	11,327	32–21–6	70
60	February 26	Ottawa	2–1	Florida		Anderson	14,118	33–21–6	72
61	February 27	Ottawa	1–5	Tampa Bay		Condon	19,092	33–22–6	72

March: 8–4–3 (Home: 4–1–2; Road: 4–3–1)
#	Date	Visitor	Score	Home	OT	Decision	Attendance	Record	Pts	Recap
62	March 2	Colorado	1–2	Ottawa		Anderson	16,932	34–22–6	74
63	March 4	Columbus	2–3	Ottawa		Anderson	17,516	35–22–6	76
64	March 6	Boston	2–4	Ottawa		Anderson	17,046	36–22–6	78
65	March 8	Ottawa	5–2	Dallas		Anderson	17,689	37–22–6	80
66	March 9	Ottawa	3–2	Arizona	OT	Condon	10,611	38–22–6	82
67	March 11	Ottawa	4–2	Colorado		Anderson	15,317	39–22–6	84
68	March 14	Tampa Bay	2–1	Ottawa	OT	Condon	16,894	39–22–7	85
69	March 16	Chicago	2–1	Ottawa		Condon	18,638	39–23–7	85
70	March 18	Montreal	4–3	Ottawa	SO	Anderson	19,653	39–23–8	86
71	March 19	Ottawa	1–4	Montreal		Anderson	21,273	39–24–8	86
72	March 21	Ottawa	3–2	Boston		Anderson	17,565	40–24–8	88
73	March 23	Pittsburgh	1–2	Ottawa	SO	Condon	18,102	41–24–8	90
74	March 25	Ottawa	1–3	Montreal		Anderson	21,288	41–25–8	90
75	March 28	Ottawa	2–3	Philadelphia	SO	Anderson	19,706	41–25–9	91
76	March 30	Ottawa	1–5	Minnesota		Anderson	19,044	41–26–9	91

April: 3–2–1 (Home: 2–0–0; Road: 1–2–1)
#	Date	Visitor	Score	Home	OT	Decision	Attendance	Record	Pts	Recap
77	April 1	Ottawa	2–4	Winnipeg		Condon	15,294	41–27–9	91
78	April 3	Ottawa	4–5	Detroit	SO	Anderson	20,027	41–27–10	92
79	April 4	Detroit	0–2	Ottawa		Anderson	17,166	42–27–10	94
80	April 6	Ottawa	2–1	Boston	SO	Anderson	17,565	43–27–10	96
81	April 8	NY Rangers	1–3	Ottawa		Anderson	18,976	44–27–10	98
82	April 9	Ottawa	2–4	NY Islanders		Condon	13,303	44–28–10	98

Legend: Win (2 points) Loss (0 points) Overtime/shootout loss (1 point)

=== Playoffs ===
2017 Stanley Cup playoffs

Eastern Conference First Round vs. (A3) Boston Bruins: Ottawa wins series 4–2
#	Date	Visitor	Score	Home	OT	Decision	Attendance	Series	Recap
1	April 12	Boston	2–1	Ottawa		Anderson	18,702	0–1
2	April 15	Boston	3–4	Ottawa	OT	Anderson	18,629	1–1
3	April 17	Ottawa	4–3	Boston	OT	Anderson	17,565	2–1
4	April 19	Ottawa	1–0	Boston		Anderson	17,565	3–1
5	April 21	Boston	3–2	Ottawa	2OT	Anderson	19,209	3–2
6	April 23	Ottawa	3–2	Boston	OT	Anderson	17,565	4–2

Eastern Conference Second Round vs. (WC1) New York Rangers: Ottawa wins series 4–2
#	Date	Visitor	Score	Home	OT	Decision	Attendance	Series	Recap
1	April 27	NY Rangers	1–2	Ottawa		Anderson	16,744	1–0
2	April 29	NY Rangers	5–6	Ottawa	2OT	Anderson	18,679	2–0
3	May 2	Ottawa	1–4	NY Rangers		Anderson	18,006	2–1
4	May 4	Ottawa	1–4	NY Rangers		Anderson	18,006	2–2
5	May 6	NY Rangers	4–5	Ottawa	OT	Anderson	19,082	3–2
6	May 9	Ottawa	4–2	NY Rangers		Anderson	18,006	4–2

Eastern Conference Final vs. (M2) Pittsburgh Penguins: Pittsburgh wins series 4–3
#	Date	Visitor	Score	Home	OT	Decision	Attendance	Series	Recap
1	May 13	Ottawa	2–1	Pittsburgh	OT	Anderson	18,614	1–0
2	May 15	Ottawa	0–1	Pittsburgh		Anderson	18,610	1–1
3	May 17	Pittsburgh	1–5	Ottawa		Anderson	18,615	2–1
4	May 19	Pittsburgh	3–2	Ottawa		Anderson	19,145	2–2
5	May 21	Ottawa	0–7	Pittsburgh		Anderson	18,635	2–3
6	May 23	Pittsburgh	1–2	Ottawa		Anderson	18,111	3–3
7	May 25	Ottawa	2–3	Pittsburgh	2OT	Anderson	18,604	3–4

Legend: Win Loss

== Players ==
=== Statistics ===
Final Stats

Scoring

Regular season
Player	GP	G	A	Pts	+/-	PIM
Erik Karlsson	77	17	**54**	**71**	10	28
Mike Hoffman	74	26	35	61	**17**	51
Kyle Turris	78	**27**	28	55	−3	47
Mark Stone	71	22	32	54	12	25
Derick Brassard	81	14	25	39	12	24
Jean-Gabriel Pageau	**82**	12	21	33	13	24
Zack Smith	74	16	16	32	6	61
Ryan Dzingel	81	14	18	32	7	30
Dion Phaneuf	81	9	21	30	−6	100
Bobby Ryan	62	13	12	25	−3	24
Tom Pyatt	**82**	9	14	23	9	16
Chris Wideman	76	5	12	17	7	46
Cody Ceci	79	2	15	17	−11	20
Chris Kelly	**82**	5	7	12	−17	23
Marc Methot	68	0	12	12	13	24
Alex Burrows†	20	6	5	11	6	9
Fredrik Claesson	33	3	8	11	5	4
Tommy Wingels†	36	2	2	4	−9	12
Viktor Stalberg†	18	2	2	4	−3	8
Chris Neil	53	1	3	4	−11	63
Mark Borowiecki	70	1	2	3	−3	**154**
Curtis Lazar‡	33	0	1	1	−10	4
Matt Puempel‡	13	0	0	0	−5	7
Max McCormick	7	0	0	0	−3	0
Casey Bailey	7	0	0	0	−1	0
Phil Varone	7	0	0	0	−3	2
Ben Harpur	6	0	0	0	−1	0
Andreas Englund	5	0	0	0	−3	2
Buddy Robinson‡	4	0	0	0	0	2
Clarke MacArthur	4	0	0	0	−1	0
Chris DiDomenico	3	0	0	0	0	6
Jyrki Jokipakka†	3	0	0	0	−1	0
Mike Blunden	2	0	0	0	0	4
Colin White	2	0	0	0	0	0
Thomas Chabot	1	0	0	0	−2	0
Nick Paul	1	0	0	0	−2	0

Playoffs
Player	GP	G	A	Pts	+/-	PIM
Erik Karlsson	19	2	16	18	13	10
Bobby Ryan	19	6	9	15	1	14
Mike Hoffman	19	6	5	11	3	10
Derick Brassard	19	4	7	11	−3	8
Jean-Gabriel Pageau	19	8	2	10	5	16
Kyle Turris	19	4	6	10	2	25
Clarke MacArthur	19	3	6	9	5	12
Mark Stone	19	5	3	8	5	20
Zack Smith	19	1	5	6	−5	12
Dion Phaneuf	19	1	4	5	−3	17
Alex Burrows	15	0	5	5	0	8
Marc Methot	18	2	2	4	5	10
Chris Wideman	15	1	3	4	−4	4
Ryan Dzingel	15	2	1	3	−1	4
Fredrik Claesson	14	0	3	3	3	4
Tom Pyatt	14	2	0	2	−3	0
Viktor Stalberg	17	0	2	2	−8	2
Ben Harpur	9	0	2	2	−3	4
Cody Ceci	19	0	1	1	−7	2
Tommy Wingels	9	0	0	0	0	4
Mark Borowiecki	2	0	0	0	0	2
Chris Neil	2	0	0	0	0	12
Chris Kelly	2	0	0	0	0	0
Colin White	1	0	0	0	0	0

Goaltenders

Regular season
Player	GP	GS	TOI	W	L	OT	GA	GAA	SA	SV%	SO	G	A	PIM
Craig Anderson	**40**	**40**	**2,421:14**	**25**	11	4	92	**2.28**	**1,247**	**.926**	**5**	0	**1**	0
Mike Condon†	**40**	38	2,304:25	19	**14**	**6**	**96**	2.50	1,115	.914	**5**	0	0	**4**
Andrew Hammond	6	4	205:39	0	2	0	14	4.08	86	.837	0	0	0	0
Chris Driedger	1	0	40:00	0	1	0	4	6.00	15	.733	0	0	0	0

Playoffs
Player	GP	GS	TOI	W	L	GA	GAA	SA	SV%	SO	G	A	PIM
Craig Anderson	19	19	1,178:08	11	8	46	2.34	590	.922	1	0	1	0
Mike Condon	2	0	61:17	0	0	4	3.92	32	.875	0	0	0	0

^{†}Denotes player spent time with another team before joining the Senators. Stats reflect time with the Senators only.
^{‡}No longer with team.
Bold denotes team leader in that category.

=== Awards ===
Regular season
Player	Award	Awarded
Craig Anderson	NHL First Star of the Week	October 31, 2016
Craig Anderson	NHL First Star of the Week	November 28, 2016
Erik Karlsson	NHL Third Star of the Week	March 13, 2017
Craig Anderson	NHL First Star of the Week	April 10, 2017

==== NHL awards ====
Trophy	Player	Status
Bill Masterton Memorial Trophy	Craig Anderson	Winner
James Norris Memorial Trophy	Erik Karlsson	Finalist
NHL general manager of the Year Award	Pierre Dorion	Finalist

=== Records ===
Player	Record	Date
Erik Karlsson	Franchise record for most career goals by a defenceman (102)	October 18, 2016
Erik Karlsson	Franchise record for most career points by a defenceman (411)	December 7, 2016
Erik Karlsson	Franchise record for most career assists by a defenceman (310)	December 27, 2016
Mike Condon	Franchise record for most consecutive appearances by a goaltender (26)	February 2, 2017
Erik Karlsson	Franchise record for most consecutive games played (312)	March 4, 2017
Erik Karlsson	Franchise record for most career overtime winners scored by a defenceman (4)	March 9, 2017
Craig Anderson	Franchise record for career wins by a goaltender (147)	March 11, 2017
Team	Record	Date
Ottawa Senators	Franchise record for most shots against in an overtime period (8)	November 9, 2016
Ottawa Senators	Franchise record for most consecutive penalty kills (35)	October 22, 2016 - November 22, 2016
Ottawa Senators	Franchise record for most consecutive games scoring 2 goals or less (12)	October 28, 2016 - November 22, 2016
Ottawa Senators	Franchise record for most shots on goal in a period in a playoff game (21)	April 27, 2017
Ottawa Senators	Franchise record for scoring the quickest three goals in a postseason game (2:18)	May 17, 2017

=== Milestones ===
Player	Milestone	Date
Thomas Chabot	1st NHL game	October 18, 2016
Mike Hoffman	200th NHL game	November 11, 2016
Erik Karlsson	400th NHL point	November 22, 2016
Erik Karlsson	500th NHL game	November 26, 2016
Mark Stone	200th NHL game	November 29, 2016
Erik Karlsson	300th NHL assist	November 29, 2016
Mike Hoffman	1st NHL hat-trick	November 29, 2016
Andreas Englund	1st NHL game	December 3, 2016
Chris Neil	1000th NHL game	December 10, 2016
Jean-Gabriel Pageau	200th NHL game	December 17, 2016
Derick Brassard	600th NHL game	January 1, 2017
Chris Wideman	100th NHL game	January 14, 2017
Kyle Turris	500th NHL game	January 22, 2017
Mark Stone	100th NHL assist	January 31, 2017
Chris Kelly	800th NHL game	February 2, 2017
Tom Pyatt	300th NHL game	February 16, 2017
Mark Borowiecki	200th NHL game	February 27, 2017
Kyle Turris	300th NHL point	February 27, 2017
Fredrik Claesson	1st NHL goal	March 8, 2017
Chris DiDomenico	1st NHL game	March 9, 2017
Ryan Dzingel	100th NHL game	March 18, 2017
Craig Anderson	500th NHL game	March 25, 2017
Colin White	1st NHL game	April 3, 2017
Dion Phaneuf	900th NHL game	April 4, 2017
Jean-Gabriel Pageau	100th NHL point	April 8, 2017

== Transactions ==
=== Trades ===
Date	Details		Reference
June 25, 2016	To New Jersey Devils OTT's 1st-round pick (12th overall) in 2016; NYI's 3rd-round pick (80th overall) in 2016	To Ottawa Senators NJD's 1st-round pick (11th overall) in 2016	
June 27, 2016	To Calgary Flames Alex Chiasson	To Ottawa Senators Patrick Sieloff	
July 18, 2016	To New York Rangers Mika Zibanejad; 2nd-round pick in 2018	To Ottawa Senators Derick Brassard; 7th-round pick in 2018	
November 2, 2016	To Pittsburgh Penguins 5th-round pick in 2017	To Ottawa Senators Mike Condon	
January 24, 2017	To San Jose Sharks Buddy Robinson; Zack Stortini; 7th-round pick in 2017	To Ottawa Senators Tommy Wingels	
February 1, 2017	To Minnesota Wild Future considerations	To Ottawa Senators Marc Hagel	
February 27, 2017	To Vancouver Canucks Jonathan Dahlen	To Ottawa Senators Alex Burrows	
February 28, 2017	To Carolina Hurricanes 3rd-round pick in 2017	To Ottawa Senators Viktor Stalberg	
March 1, 2017	To Calgary Flames Curtis Lazar; Michael Kostka	To Ottawa Senators Jyrki Jokipakka; 2nd-round pick in 2017	
March 6, 2017	To New Jersey Devils Future considerations	To Ottawa Senators Brandon Gormley	

=== Free agents acquired ===
Date	Player	Former team	Contract terms (in U.S. dollars)	Ref
July 1, 2016	Mike Blunden	Tampa Bay Lightning	2-year, $1.475 million two-way	
July 1, 2016	Chad Nehring	Hartford Wolf Pack (AHL)	1-year, $600,000 two-way	
July 7, 2016	Chris Kelly	Boston Bruins	1-year, $900,000	
February 27, 2017	Chris DiDomenico	SCL Tigers (NLA)	2-years, $1.25 million, two-way	

=== Free agents lost ===
Date	Player	New team	Contract terms (in U.S. dollars)	Ref
July 1, 2016	Patrick Wiercioch	Colorado Avalanche	1-year, $800,000	

=== Claimed via waivers ===
Player	Previous team	Date	Ref

=== Lost via waivers ===
Player	New team	Date	Ref
Matt Puempel	New York Rangers	November 21, 2016	

=== Player signings ===
Date	Player	Contract terms (in U.S. dollars)	Ref
July 1, 2016	Michael Kostka	1 year, $800,000 two-way	
July 1, 2016	Max McCormick	1 year, $650,000 two-way	
July 1, 2016	Casey Bailey	1 year, $874,125 two-way	
July 1, 2016	Phil Varone	1 year, $700,000 two-way	
July 5, 2016	Ryan Dzingel	1 year, $750,000 two-way	
July 6, 2016	Fredrik Claesson	1 year, $700,000 two-way	
July 15, 2016	Matt Puempel	1 year, $900,000 two-way	
July 27, 2016	Mike Hoffman	4 years, $20.75 million	
August 23, 2016	Cody Ceci	2 years, $5.6 million	
September 23, 2016	Gabriel Gagne	3 years, $2.775 million entry-level contract	
October 3, 2016	Maxime Lajoie	3 years, $2.4 million entry-level contract	
December 22, 2016	Filip Chlapik	3 years, $2.775 million entry-level contract	
January 23, 2017	Zack Smith	4 years, $13 million contract extension	
February 20, 2017	Fredrik Claesson	1 year, $650,000 one-way contract extension	
February 27, 2017	Alex Burrows	2-year, $5 million contract extension	
March 30, 2017	Marcus Hogberg	2-year, entry-level contract	
April 2, 2017	Colin White	3-year, entry-level contract	
May 30, 2017	Christian Jaros	3-year, entry-level contract	

Suspensions/fines
Player	Reason	Length	Salary	Date issued
Mark Borowiecki	Illegal boarding of Los Angeles Kings forward Tyler Toffoli during NHL game no. 412 in Los Angeles on December 10	2 games	$12,222.22	December 11, 2016
Mike Hoffman	Illegal check to the head of San Jose Sharks forward Logan Couture during NHL game no. 441 in Ottawa on December 14	2 games	$57,638.88	December 16, 2016

== Draft picks ==
Below are the Ottawa Senators' selections at the 2016 NHL entry draft, held on June 24–25, 2016, at the First Niagara Center in Buffalo, New York.

Round	Overall	Player	Position	Nationality	Club team
1	11	Logan Brown	Centre	United States	Windsor Spitfires (OHL)
2	42	Jonathan Dahlen	Left wing	Sweden	Timra IK (HockeyAllsvenskan)
4	103	Todd Burgess	Right wing	United States	Fairbanks Ice Dogs (NAHL)
5	133	Maxime Lajoie	Defence	Canada	Swift Current Broncos (WHL)
6	163	Markus Nurmi	Right wing	Finland	TPS (Jr. A Liiga)

Draft Notes

- The New Jersey Devils' first-round pick (#11 overall) went to the Ottawa Senators as a result of trade that was made on June 25, 2016 that sent Ottawa's first-round pick (#12 overall) and a conditional third-round pick (#80 overall) to the Devils.
- The Ottawa Senators' seventh-round pick went to the New York Islanders as part of a trade that saw Shane Prince being traded to the Islanders on February 29, 2016.
