= List of 2016–17 NHL Three Star Awards =

The 2016–17 NHL Three Star Awards are the way the National Hockey League denotes its players of the week and players of the month of the 2016–17 season.

== Weekly ==
Weekly
Week	First Star	Second Star	Third Star
October 16, 2016	Connor McDavid (Edmonton Oilers)	Auston Matthews (Toronto Maple Leafs)	Roberto Luongo (Florida Panthers)
October 23, 2016	Cam Talbot (Edmonton Oilers)	Artem Anisimov (Chicago Blackhawks)	Mike Green (Detroit Red Wings)
October 30, 2016	Craig Anderson (Ottawa Senators)	Devan Dubnyk (Minnesota Wild)	Shea Weber (Montreal Canadiens)
November 6, 2016	Nikita Kucherov (Tampa Bay Lightning)	Corey Crawford (Chicago Blackhawks)	Kevin Hayes (New York Rangers)
November 13, 2016	Tuukka Rask (Boston Bruins)	Mark Scheifele (Winnipeg Jets)	Pekka Rinne (Nashville Predators)
November 20, 2016	Jeff Carter (Los Angeles Kings)	Cam Ward (Carolina Hurricanes)	Nicklas Backstrom (Washington Capitals)
November 27, 2016	Craig Anderson (Ottawa Senators)	Michael Cammalleri (New Jersey Devils)	Brent Burns (San Jose Sharks)
December 4, 2016	Steve Mason (Philadelphia Flyers)	Vladimir Tarasenko (St. Louis Blues)	Martin Jones (San Jose Sharks)
December 11, 2016	Jakub Voracek (Philadelphia Flyers)	Antti Raanta (New York Rangers)	Sam Gagner (Columbus Blue Jackets)
December 18, 2016	Artemi Panarin (Chicago Blackhawks)	Henrik Lundqvist (New York Rangers)	Eric Staal (Minnesota Wild)
December 25, 2016	Jaromir Jagr (Florida Panthers)	Jeff Carter (Los Angeles Kings)	Cam Talbot (Edmonton Oilers)
January 1, 2017	Auston Matthews (Toronto Maple Leafs)	Chris Kreider (New York Rangers)	Marc-Andre Fleury (Pittsburgh Penguins)
January 8, 2017	Michael Grabner (New York Rangers)	Patrick Maroon (Edmonton Oilers)	Braden Holtby (Washington Capitals)
January 15, 2017	Nicklas Backstrom (Washington Capitals)	Brad Marchand (Boston Bruins)	Brock McGinn (Carolina Hurricanes)
January 22, 2017	Conor Sheary (Pittsburgh Penguins)	Thomas Greiss (New York Islanders)	T. J. Oshie (Washington Capitals)
January 29, 2017	Wayne Simmonds (Philadelphia Flyers)	Patrick Marleau (San Jose Sharks)	Frederik Andersen (Toronto Maple Leafs)
February 5, 2017	Sebastian Aho (Carolina Hurricanes)	Mikael Granlund (Minnesota Wild)	Peter Budaj (Los Angeles Kings)
February 12, 2017	Jason Pominville (Minnesota Wild)	Jake Allen (St. Louis Blues)	Viktor Arvidsson (Nashville Predators)
February 19, 2017	Patrik Laine (Winnipeg Jets)	Nazem Kadri (Toronto Maple Leafs)	Connor McDavid (Edmonton Oilers)
February 26, 2017	Filip Forsberg (Nashville Predators)	Jonathan Toews (Chicago Blackhawks)	Johnny Gaudreau (Calgary Flames)
March 5, 2017	Nikita Kucherov (Tampa Bay Lightning)	Sergei Bobrovsky (Columbus Blue Jackets)	Carey Price (Montreal Canadiens)
March 12, 2017	Joe Pavelski (San Jose Sharks)	Jonathan Bernier (Anaheim Ducks)	Erik Karlsson (Ottawa Senators)
March 19, 2017	Brad Marchand (Boston Bruins)	Sidney Crosby (Pittsburgh Penguins)	Brian Elliott (Calgary Flames)
March 26, 2017	Nikita Kucherov (Tampa Bay Lightning)	Kari Lehtonen (Dallas Stars)	Ryan Getzlaf (Anaheim Ducks)
April 2, 2017	Artemi Panarin (Chicago Blackhawks)	Marcus Johansson (Washington Capitals)	Cam Talbot (Edmonton Oilers)
April 9, 2017	Craig Anderson (Ottawa Senators)	Oscar Klefbom (Edmonton Oilers)	Brayden Point (Tampa Bay Lightning)

== Monthly ==
Monthly
Month	First Star	Second Star	Third Star
October	Connor McDavid (Edmonton Oilers)	Shea Weber (Montreal Canadiens)	Jonathan Marchessault (Florida Panthers)
November	Pekka Rinne (Nashville Predators)	Nikita Kucherov (Tampa Bay Lightning)	Connor McDavid (Edmonton Oilers)
December	Sergei Bobrovsky (Columbus Blue Jackets)	Evgeni Malkin (Pittsburgh Penguins)	Devan Dubnyk (Minnesota Wild)
January	Evgeny Kuznetsov (Washington Capitals)	Brad Marchand (Boston Bruins)	Brent Burns (San Jose Sharks)
February	Jonathan Toews (Chicago Blackhawks)	Filip Forsberg (Nashville Predators)	Braden Holtby (Washington Capitals)
March	Nikita Kucherov (Tampa Bay Lightning)	Sergei Bobrovsky (Columbus Blue Jackets)	Patrick Kane (Chicago Blackhawks)

== Rookie of the Month ==
Rookie of the Month
Month	Player
October	William Nylander (Toronto Maple Leafs)
November	Zach Werenski (Columbus Blue Jackets)
December	Auston Matthews (Toronto Maple Leafs)
January	Mitch Marner (Toronto Maple Leafs)
February	Patrik Laine (Winnipeg Jets)
March	William Nylander (Toronto Maple Leafs)

== See also ==
- Three stars (ice hockey)
- 2016–17 NHL season
- 2016–17 NHL suspensions and fines
- 2016–17 NHL transactions
- 2016 NHL entry draft
- 2016 in sports
- 2017 in sports
- 2015–16 NHL Three Star Awards
- 2017–18 NHL Three Star Awards
