= 2016–17 Calgary Flames season =

NHL team season

2016–17 Calgary Flames
- Division: 4th Pacific
- Conference: 7th Western
- 2016–17 record: 45–33–4
- Home record: 24–17–0
- Road record: 21–16–4
- Goals for: 226
- Goals against: 221

Team information
- General manager: Brad Treliving
- Coach: Glen Gulutzan
- Captain: Mark Giordano
- Alternate captains: Troy Brouwer; Sean Monahan
- Arena: Scotiabank Saddledome
- Average attendance: 18,727 (97.1%)
- Minor league affiliates: Stockton Heat (AHL); Adirondack Thunder (ECHL)

Team leaders
- Goals: Sean Monahan (27)
- Assists: Johnny Gaudreau (43)
- Points: Johnny Gaudreau (61)
- Penalty minutes: Matthew Tkachuk (105)
- Plus/minus: Mark Giordano (+22)
- Wins: Brian Elliott (26)
- Goals against average: Jon Gillies (1.00)

The 2016–17 Calgary Flames season was their 37th season in Calgary, and the 45th season for the National Hockey League (NHL) franchise that was established on June 6, 1972.

== Off-season ==
After a season of high expectations from the 2014–15 season for the Flames, those results did not carry over into the 2015–16 season. The team finished with only 77 points and failed to qualify for the 2016 NHL Playoffs. To start with, Bob Hartley was let go, and Glen Gulutzan was brought in as the new coach. The biggest question the Flames faced in the off-season was acquiring a proven number one goalie. Jonas Hiller, Karri Ramo, and Joni Ortio all combined for a save percentage of .892 and goals against of 3.13, an NHL-worst in the 2015–16 season. General manager Brad Treliving addressed this need by acquiring veteran Brian Elliott on June 24, 2016, in a deal on the sidelines of the 2016 NHL entry draft. On the draft's opening day the Flames got top prospect Matthew Tkachuk as the 6th overall pick of the Draft. On July 1, 2016, the Flames made significant acquisitions by signing power forward Troy Brouwer and journeyman goaltender Chad Johnson. Several other players such as Alex Chiasson and Linden Vey were also brought in. The next biggest task Treliving faced was signing rising stars Johnny Gaudreau and Sean Monahan to contracts. On August 19, 2016, Monahan and the Flames agreed to a 7-year deal worth $44.625 million. On October 10, 2016, two days before the start of the regular season, Gaudreau and the Flames agreed to a 6-year deal worth $40.5 million. Gaudreau was tied with defenceman and captain Mark Giordano as the highest-paid Flames player.

== Regular season ==
=== October – December ===
The Flames open their season with their first two losses 7-4 and 5–3 to their provincial rival Edmonton Oilers. The team was expected to have an improved save percentage with Brian Eliott. However, they had a rough time with their No. 1 goaltender Brian Elliott which led them being placed outside of playoff picture promoting them to switch to their backup goaltender Chad Johnson. Chad Johnson was proved to be a better goaltender than Brian Eliott for about a month. They had a six-game winning streak from November 30 to December 14 which elevated them back into playoff position. After their six-game winning streak ended with a 6–3 loss to Tampa Bay Lightning 6–3, the starting goaltender position slowly shifted back to Brian Elliott.

=== January – April ===
The Flames continued to maintain their position in the playoff spot. They struggled the rest of the month, but they continued to keep pace in the conference standings. Even on February 25, 2017, the Flames still held the first wildcard spot in the Western Conference.

With their win over the New York Islanders on March 5, the Flames surpassed their total number of wins – 35 – of the 2015–16 season.

With their win over the Winnipeg Jets on March 11, the Flames surpassed their franchise-long winning streak while based in the city of Calgary, at 9 consecutive games. Goalie Brian Elliott also recorded his second shutout in a row. The Flames tied their all-time franchise winning streak of 10 games with a shootout win over the Pittsburgh Penguins on March 13. The Atlanta Flames won 10 straight from October 14 to November 3, 1978. The streak would end with their next game on March 15, being outscored by the Boston Bruins 5–2. Though Chad Johnson started in net due to Brian Elliott waking up that morning with the flu, coach Glen Gulutzan told reporters that no individual player was responsible for the loss to the Bruins and the end of the streak.

On March 20, Brian Elliott was named the NHL's 3rd Star of the Week for the week of March 20 to the 26th. From February 20 – March 20, Elliott recorded a career-best winning streak of 11 games, featuring back-to-back shutouts on March 9 and 11. In addition during the streak, Elliott also tied the longest winning streak for a Flames game-starting goalie, an 11-game record set by the legendary Mike Vernon from January 17 to February 27, 1989.

Forward Matthew Tkachuk was suspended by the NHL for two games (on March 21 and March 23) due to Tkachuk's elbow purposely hitting the head of the L.A. Kings' Drew Doughty in the Flames' win on March 19.

In the Flames' 3–2 win over the St. Louis Blues on March 25, centreman and alternate captain Sean Monahan broke Jarome Iginla's franchise regular-season overtime winning goal record with Monahan's seventh career regular-season 5-minute overtime period goal.

With a win against the San Jose Sharks on March 31, the Flames clinched a playoff berth, their first postseason appearance since the 2014–15 season and only their second playoff appearance in the last eight seasons.

== Standings ==
Pacific Division
Pos	Team	GP	W	L	OTL	ROW	GF	GA	GD	Pts
1	y – Anaheim Ducks	82	46	23	13	43	223	200	+23	105
2	x – Edmonton Oilers	82	47	26	9	43	247	212	+35	103
3	x – San Jose Sharks	82	46	29	7	44	221	201	+20	99
4	x – Calgary Flames	82	45	33	4	41	226	221	+5	94
5	Los Angeles Kings	82	39	35	8	37	201	205	−4	86
6	Arizona Coyotes	82	30	42	10	24	197	260	−63	70
7	Vancouver Canucks	82	30	43	9	26	182	243	−61	69

Source: National Hockey League
x – Clinched playoff spot; y – Clinched division

Western Conference Wild Card
Pos	Div	Team	GP	W	L	OTL	ROW	GF	GA	GD	Pts
1	PA	x – Calgary Flames	82	45	33	4	41	226	221	+5	94
2	CE	x – Nashville Predators	82	41	29	12	39	240	224	+16	94
3	CE	Winnipeg Jets	82	40	35	7	37	249	256	−7	87
4	PA	Los Angeles Kings	82	39	35	8	37	201	205	−4	86
5	CE	Dallas Stars	82	34	37	11	33	223	262	−39	79
6	PA	Arizona Coyotes	82	30	42	10	24	197	260	−63	70
7	PA	Vancouver Canucks	82	30	43	9	26	182	243	−61	69
8	CE	Colorado Avalanche	82	22	56	4	21	166	278	−112	48

Source: National Hockey League
x – Clinched playoff spot

== Schedule and results ==
=== Pre-season ===
Pre-season game log

Rookie Tournament: 2–0–1
#	Date	Visitor	Score	Home	OT	Decision	Attendance	Record	Recap
1^{[a]}	September 16	Calgary Rookies	4–1	Winnipeg Rookies		Gillies	2,706	1–0–0	Recap
2^{[a]}	September 17	Calgary Rookies	3–4	Edmonton Rookies	OT	McDonald	4,086	1–0–1	Recap
3^{[a]}	September 19	Vancouver Rookies	3–4	Calgary Rookies	OT	Parsons	3,376	2–0–1	Recap
^{[a]}Young Stars Classic Rookie Tournament at South Okanagan Events Centre in Penticton, British Columbia

September/October: 3–4–0 (Home: 2–2–0; Road: 1–2–0)
#	Date	Visitor	Score	Home	OT	Decision	Attendance	Record	Recap
1^{[A]}	September 26	Edmonton	2–1	Calgary		McDonald	18,114	0–1–0	Recap
2^{[A]}	September 26	Calgary	2–4	Edmonton		Gillies	18,500	0–2–0	Recap
3	September 27	Calgary	3–0	Winnipeg		Johnson	15,006	1–2–0	Recap
4	September 30	Vancouver	1–2	Calgary		Elliott	19,102	2–2–0	Recap
5	October 2	Winnipeg	4–0	Calgary		Johnson	18,158	2–3–0	Recap
6	October 5	Arizona	1–2	Calgary	SO	Elliott	17,878	3–3–0	Recap
7	October 6	Calgary	0–4	Vancouver		Johnson	17,960	3–4–0	Recap
^{A} – indicates split-squad game.

=== Regular season ===
2016–17 game log

October: 4–5–1 (Home: 2–4–0; Road: 2–1–1)
#	Date	Visitor	Score	Home	OT	Decision	Attendance	Record	Pts	Recap
1	October 12	Calgary	4–7	Edmonton		Elliott	18,347	0–1–0	0	Recap
2	October 14	Edmonton	5–3	Calgary		Elliott	19,289	0–2–0	0	Recap
3	October 15	Calgary	1–2	Vancouver	SO	Johnson	18,865	0–2–1	1	Recap
4	October 18	Buffalo	3–4	Calgary	OT	Johnson	19,289	1–2–1	3	Recap
5	October 20	Carolina	4–2	Calgary		Elliott	17,652	1–3–1	3	Recap
6	October 22	St. Louis	6–4	Calgary		Johnson	18,076	1–4–1	3	Recap
7	October 24	Calgary	3–2	Chicago	SO	Elliott	21,348	2–4–1	5	Recap
8	October 25	Calgary	4–1	St. Louis		Elliott	17,337	3–4–1	7	Recap
9	October 28	Ottawa	2–5	Calgary		Elliott	18,132	4–4–1	9	Recap
10	October 30	Washington	3–1	Calgary		Elliott	18,454	4–5–1	9	Recap

November: 7–8–1 (Home: 2–3–0; Road: 5–5–1)
#	Date	Visitor	Score	Home	OT	Decision	Attendance	Record	Pts	Recap
11	November 1	Calgary	1–5	Chicago		Elliott	21,166	4–6–1	9	Recap
12	November 3	Calgary	3–2	San Jose		Johnson	17,562	5–6–1	11	Recap
13	November 5	Calgary	0–5	Los Angeles		Elliott	18,230	5–7–1	11	Recap
14	November 6	Calgary	1–4	Anaheim		Johnson	16,218	5–8–1	11	Recap
15	November 10	Dallas	4–2	Calgary		Elliott	18,795	5–9–1	11	Recap
16	November 12	NY Rangers	4–1	Calgary		Elliott	18,421	5–10–1	11	Recap
17	November 15	Calgary	1–0	Minnesota		Johnson	19,048	6–10–1	13	Recap
18	November 16	Arizona	1–2	Calgary	OT	Johnson	18,202	7–10–1	15	Recap
19	November 18	Chicago	3–2	Calgary		Johnson	18,691	7–11–1	15	Recap
20	November 20	Calgary	3–2	Detroit		Johnson	20,027	8–11–1	17	Recap
21	November 21	Calgary	2–4	Buffalo		Elliott	17,526	8–12–1	17	Recap
22	November 23	Calgary	2–0	Columbus		Johnson	13,140	9–12–1	19	Recap
23	November 25	Calgary	2–1	Boston		Johnson	17,565	10–12–1	21	Recap
24	November 27	Calgary	3–5	Philadelphia		Johnson	19,408	10–13–1	21	Recap
25	November 28	Calgary	1–2	NY Islanders	OT	Elliott	10,772	10–13–2	22	Recap
26	November 30	Toronto	0–3	Calgary		Johnson	19,289	11–13–2	24	Recap

December: 9–4–0 (Home: 5–3–0; Road: 4–1–0)
#	Date	Visitor	Score	Home	OT	Decision	Attendance	Record	Pts	Recap
27	December 2	Minnesota	2–3	Calgary	SO	Johnson	18,390	12–13–2	26	Recap
28	December 4	Anaheim	3–8	Calgary		Johnson	17,840	13–13–2	28	Recap
29	December 6	Calgary	2–1	Dallas		Johnson	17,996	14–13–2	30	Recap
30	December 8	Calgary	2–1	Arizona	OT	Johnson	10,210	15–13–2	32	Recap
31	December 10	Winnipeg	2–6	Calgary		Johnson	18,677	16–13–2	34	Recap
32	December 14	Tampa Bay	6–3	Calgary		Johnson	18,164	16–14–2	34	Recap
33	December 16	Columbus	4–1	Calgary		Johnson	18,045	16–15–2	34	Recap
34	December 19	Calgary	4–2	Arizona		Elliott	12,192	17–15–2	36	Recap
35	December 20	Calgary	1–4	San Jose		Johnson	17,562	17–16–2	36	Recap
36	December 23	Vancouver	1–4	Calgary		Elliott	18,840	18–16–2	38	Recap
37	December 27	Calgary	6–3	Colorado		Elliott	14,634	19–16–2	40	Recap
38	December 29	Anaheim	3–1	Calgary		Johnson	19,289	19–17–2	40	Recap
39	December 31	Arizona	2–4	Calgary		Elliott	19,289	20–17–2	42	Recap

January: 5–7–1 (Home: 4–3–0; Road: 1–4–1)
#	Date	Visitor	Score	Home	OT	Decision	Attendance	Record	Pts	Recap
40	January 4	Colorado	1–4	Calgary		Elliott	18,388	21–17–2	44	Recap
41	January 6	Calgary	2–4	Vancouver		Elliott	18,865	21–18–2	44	Recap
42	January 7	Vancouver	1–3	Calgary		Johnson	18,685	22–18–2	46	Recap
43	January 9	Calgary	0–2	Winnipeg		Johnson	15,294	22–19–2	46	Recap
44	January 11	San Jose	2–3	Calgary		Johnson	18,912	23–19–2	48	Recap
45	January 13	New Jersey	2–1	Calgary		Johnson	19,190	23–20–2	48	Recap
46	January 14	Calgary	1–2	Edmonton	SO	Elliott	18,347	23–20–3	49	Recap
47	January 17	Florida	2–5	Calgary		Johnson	18,137	24–20–3	51	Recap
48	January 19	Nashville	4–3	Calgary		Johnson	18,904	24–21–3	51	Recap
49	January 21	Edmonton	7–3	Calgary		Elliott	19,289	24–22–3	51	Recap
50	January 23	Calgary	0–4	Toronto		Elliott	19,043	24–23–3	51	Recap
51	January 24	Calgary	1–5	Montreal		Johnson	21,288	24–24–3	51	Recap
52	January 26	Calgary	3–2	Ottawa	OT	Elliott	16,263	25–24–3	53	Recap
January 27–29		All-Star Break in Los Angeles

February: 9–2–1 (Home: 3–1–0; Road: 6–1–1)
#	Date	Visitor	Score	Home	OT	Decision	Attendance	Record	Pts	Recap
53	February 1	Minnesota	1–5	Calgary		Elliott	18,044	26–24–3	55	Recap
54	February 3	Calgary	4–3	New Jersey	OT	Elliott	14,716	27–24–3	57	Recap
55	February 5	Calgary	3–4	NY Rangers		Elliott	18,006	27–25–3	57	Recap
56	February 7	Calgary	3–2	Pittsburgh	SO	Johnson	18,556	28–25–3	59	Recap
57	February 13	Arizona	5–0	Calgary		Johnson	18,486	28–26–3	59	Recap
58	February 15	Philadelphia	1–3	Calgary		Elliott	18,815	29–26–3	61	Recap
59	February 18	Calgary	1–2	Vancouver	OT	Elliott	18,865	29–26–4	62	Recap
60	February 21	Calgary	6–5	Nashville	OT	Elliott	17,113	30–26–4	64	Recap
61	February 23	Calgary	3–2	Tampa Bay		Elliott	19,092	31–26–4	66	Recap
62	February 24	Calgary	4–2	Florida		Johnson	14,765	32–26–4	68	Recap
63	February 26	Calgary	3–1	Carolina		Elliott	14,112	33–26–4	70	Recap
64	February 28	Los Angeles	1–2	Calgary	OT	Elliott	19,289	34–26–4	72	Recap

March: 10–4–0 (Home: 8–2–0; Road: 2–2–0)
#	Date	Visitor	Score	Home	OT	Decision	Attendance	Record	Pts	Recap
65	March 3	Detroit	2–3	Calgary	OT	Elliott	19,289	35–26–4	74	Recap
66	March 5	NY Islanders	2–5	Calgary		Elliott	18,741	36–26–4	76	Recap
67	March 9	Montreal	0–5	Calgary		Elliott	19,289	37–26–4	78	Recap
68	March 11	Calgary	3–0	Winnipeg		Elliott	15,294	38–26–4	80	Recap
69	March 13	Pittsburgh	3–4	Calgary	SO	Elliott	19,289	39–26–4	82	Recap
70	March 15	Boston	5–2	Calgary		Johnson	18,892	39–27–4	82	Recap
71	March 17	Dallas	1–3	Calgary		Elliott	19,227	40–27–4	84	Recap
72	March 19	Los Angeles	2–5	Calgary		Elliott	19,115	41–27–4	86	Recap
73	March 21	Calgary	2–4	Washington		Elliott	18,506	41–28–4	86	Recap
74	March 23	Calgary	1–3	Nashville		Johnson	17,324	41–29–4	86	Recap
75	March 25	Calgary	3–2	St. Louis	OT	Elliott	19,516	42–29–4	88	Recap
76	March 27	Colorado	2–4	Calgary		Elliott	17,785	43–29–4	90	Recap
77	March 29	Los Angeles	4–1	Calgary		Elliott	19,005	43–30–4	90	Recap
78	March 31	San Jose	2–5	Calgary		Elliott	19,289	44–30–4	92	Recap

April: 1–3–0 (Home: 0–1–0; Road: 1–2–0)
#	Date	Visitor	Score	Home	OT	Decision	Attendance	Record	Pts	Recap
79	April 2	Anaheim	4–3	Calgary		Elliott	18,945	44–31–4	92	Recap
80	April 4	Calgary	1–3	Anaheim		Elliott	15,125	44–32–4	92	Recap
81	April 6	Calgary	4–1	Los Angeles		Gillies	18,230	45–32–4	94	Recap
82	April 8	Calgary	1–3	San Jose		Elliott	17,562	45–33–4	94	Recap

Legend: Win (2 points) Loss (0 points) Overtime/shootout loss (1 point)

=== Playoffs ===
2017 Stanley Cup playoffs

Western Conference First Round vs. (P1) Anaheim Ducks: Anaheim wins 4–0
#	Date	Visitor	Score	Home	OT	Decision	Attendance	Series	Recap
1	April 13	Calgary	2–3	Anaheim		Elliott	17,174	Anaheim leads 1–0	Recap
2	April 15	Calgary	2–3	Anaheim		Elliott	17,271	Anaheim leads 2–0	Recap
3	April 17	Anaheim	5–4	Calgary	OT	Elliott	19,289	Anaheim leads 3–0	Recap
4	April 19	Anaheim	3–1	Calgary		Johnson	19,289	Anaheim wins 4–0	Recap

Legend: Win Loss

== Player statistics ==
=== Skaters ===
Final stats

Regular season
Player	GP	G	A	Pts	+/-	PIM
Johnny Gaudreau	72	18	43	61	−7	4
Sean Monahan	82	27	31	58	−1	20
Mikael Backlund	81	22	31	53	9	36
Dougie Hamilton	81	13	37	50	12	64
Matthew Tkachuk	76	13	35	48	14	105
Michael Frolik	82	17	27	44	13	58
Mark Giordano	81	12	27	39	22	59
Kris Versteeg	69	15	22	37	−3	46
T. J. Brodie	82	6	30	36	−16	24
Sam Bennett	81	13	13	26	−16	75
Micheal Ferland	76	15	10	25	−1	50
Troy Brouwer	74	13	12	25	−11	31
Alex Chiasson	81	12	12	24	−6	46
Matt Stajan	81	6	17	23	3	40
Dennis Wideman	57	5	13	18	−6	32
Deryk Engelland	81	4	12	16	2	85
Lance Bouma	61	3	4	7	−2	35
Michael Stone^{†}	19	2	4	6	5	20
Jyrki Jokipakka^{‡}	38	1	5	6	−3	12
Garnet Hathaway	26	1	4	5	0	44
Curtis Lazar^{†}	4	1	2	3	2	0
Brett Kulak	21	0	3	3	−3	12
Freddie Hamilton	26	2	0	2	−3	8
Matt Bartkowski^{†}	24	1	1	2	−4	26
Hunter Shinkaruk	7	0	1	1	−3	2
Mark Jankowski	1	0	0	0	0	0
Rasmus Andersson	1	0	0	0	−1	0
Nicklas Grossmann	3	0	0	0	−4	2
Linden Vey	4	0	0	0	−2	0
Tyler Wotherspoon	4	0	0	0	−2	0

Playoffs
Player	GP	G	A	Pts	+/-	PIM
Sean Monahan	4	4	1	5	−4	0
Kris Versteeg	4	1	3	4	−2	4
T. J. Brodie	4	0	4	4	−1	2
Mikael Backlund	4	1	2	3	−3	0
Sam Bennett	4	2	0	2	−1	4
Troy Brouwer	4	0	2	2	−1	0
Johnny Gaudreau	4	0	2	2	−4	0
Michael Stone	4	1	0	1	−1	0
Mark Giordano	4	0	1	1	−2	2
Michael Frolik	4	0	1	1	−2	0
Dougie Hamilton	4	0	1	1	−3	8
Deryk Engelland	4	0	0	0	−3	2
Matt Bartkowski	4	0	0	0	−5	0
Alex Chiasson	4	0	0	0	−1	2
Micheal Ferland	4	0	0	0	−4	7
Matthew Tkachuk	4	0	0	0	−2	4
Matt Stajan	3	0	0	0	−1	0
Lance Bouma	3	0	0	0	−1	2
Freddie Hamilton	1	0	0	0	0	0
Curtis Lazar	1	0	0	0	0	0

=== Goaltenders ===
Final stats

Regular season
Player	GP	GS	TOI	W	L	OT	GA	GAA	SA	SV%	SO	G	A	PIM
Brian Elliott	49	45	2844:25	26	18	3	121	2.55	1,338	.910	2	0	0	4
Chad Johnson	36	36	2013:12	18	15	1	87	2.59	969	.910	3	0	0	0
Jon Gillies	1	1	60:00	1	0	0	1	1.00	28	.964	0	0	0	0
David Rittich	1	0	20:00	0	0	0	1	3.00	10	.900	0	0	0	0

Playoffs
Player	GP	GS	TOI	W	L	GA	GAA	SA	SV%	SO	G	A	PIM
Brian Elliott	4	4	185:20	0	3	12	3.89	100	.880	0	0	0	0
Chad Johnson	1	0	51:50	0	1	1	1.15	21	.952	0	0	0	0

^{†}Denotes player spent time with another organization before joining Flames. Stats reflect time with the Flames only.
^{‡}Traded mid-season. Stats reflect time with the Flames only.

== Awards and honours ==
=== Awards ===
Player	Award	Awarded	Ref.
Johnny Gaudreau	NHL All-Star game selection	January 10, 2017	
Johnny Gaudreau	NHL 3rd Star of the Week (Feb. 27 – Mar. 5)	February 27, 2017	
Brian Elliott	NHL 3rd Star of the Week (Mar. 20 – Mar. 26)	March 20, 2017	

=== Milestones ===
Player	Milestone	Reached	Ref
Matthew Tkachuk	1st NHL game	October 12, 2016	
Brett Kulak	1st NHL point (assist)	October 18, 2016	
Matthew Tkachuk	1st NHL goal	October 18, 2016	
Garnet Hathaway	1st NHL goal	November 20, 2016	
Sean Monahan	100th NHL goal	February 23, 2017	
Johnny Gaudreau	200th NHL point	March 27, 2017	
Jon Gillies	1st NHL start 1st NHL win	April 6, 2017	

== Transactions ==
=== Trades ===
February 20, 2017	To Calgary Flames Michael Stone	To Arizona Coyotes 3rd-round pick in 2017 conditional 5th-round pick in 2018
June 17, 2017	To Calgary Flames Mike Smith	To Arizona Coyotes Chad Johnson; Brandon Hickey conditional 2nd-round pick in 2018 or 3rd-round pick in 2018

== Draft picks ==
Below are the Calgary Flames' selections at the 2016 NHL entry draft, held on June 24–25, 2016, at the First Niagara Center in Buffalo.

Round	#	Player	Pos	Nationality	College/Junior/Club team (League)
1	6	Matthew Tkachuk	LW	United States	London Knights (Ontario Hockey League)
2	54^{[a]}	Tyler Parsons	G	United States	London Knights (OHL)
2	56^{[b]}	Dillon Dube	C	Canada	Kelowna Rockets (WHL)
3	66	Adam Fox	D	United States	U.S. NTDP (USHL)
4	96	Linus Lindstrom	C	Sweden	Skelleftea AIK (SHL)
5	126	Mitchell Mattson	C	United States	Grand Rapids Thunderhawks (US-MN HS)
6	156	Eetu Tuulola	RW	Finland	HPK (Liiga)
6	166^{[c]}	Matthew Phillips	C	Canada	Victoria Royals (WHL)
7	186	Stepan Falkovsky	D	Belarus	Ottawa 67's (OHL)

- The Calgary Flames' second-round pick went to the St. Louis Blues as the result of a trade on June 24, 2016, that sent Brian Elliott to Calgary in exchange for a conditional third-round pick in 2018 and this pick.
- ^{[a]} The Florida Panthers' second-round pick went to the Calgary Flames as the result of a trade on February 27, 2016, that sent Jiri Hudler to Florida in exchange for a fourth-round pick in 2018 and this pick.
- ^{[b]} The Dallas Stars' second-round pick went the Calgary Flames as the result of a trade on February 29, 2016, that sent Kris Russell to Dallas in exchange for Jyrki Jokipakka, Brett Pollock and this pick (being conditional at time of the trade). The condition – Calgary will receive a second-round pick in 2016 if Dallas fails to qualify for the 2016 Western Conference Final – was converted on May 11, 2016.
- ^{[c]} The Minnesota Wild's sixth-round pick went to the Calgary Flames as the result of a trade on February 29, 2016, that sent David Jones to Minnesota in exchange for Niklas Backstrom and this pick.
