= 2016–17 Minnesota Wild season =

National Hockey League team season

2016–17 Minnesota Wild
- Division: 2nd Central
- Conference: 2nd Western
- 2016–17 record: 49–25–8
- Home record: 27–12–2
- Road record: 22–13–6
- Goals for: 266
- Goals against: 208

Team information
- General manager: Chuck Fletcher
- Coach: Bruce Boudreau
- Captain: Mikko Koivu
- Alternate captains: Zach Parise; Ryan Suter
- Arena: Xcel Energy Center
- Minor league affiliates: Iowa Wild (AHL); Quad City Mallards (ECHL)

Team leaders
- Goals: Eric Staal (28)
- Assists: Mikael Granlund (43)
- Points: Mikael Granlund (69)
- Penalty minutes: Chris Stewart (94)
- Plus/minus: Ryan Suter; Jason Zucker (+34)
- Wins: Devan Dubnyk (40)
- Goals against average: Alex Stalock (1.51)

The 2016–17 Minnesota Wild season was the 17th season for the National Hockey League (NHL) franchise that was established on June 25, 1997.

== Standings ==
Central Division
Pos	Team	GP	W	L	OTL	ROW	GF	GA	GD	Pts
1	z – Chicago Blackhawks	82	50	23	9	46	244	213	+31	109
2	x – Minnesota Wild	82	49	25	8	46	266	208	+58	106
3	x – St. Louis Blues	82	46	29	7	44	235	218	+17	99
4	x – Nashville Predators	82	41	29	12	39	240	224	+16	94
5	Winnipeg Jets	82	40	35	7	37	249	256	−7	87
6	Dallas Stars	82	34	37	11	33	223	262	−39	79
7	Colorado Avalanche	82	22	56	4	21	166	278	−112	48

Source: National Hockey League
x – Clinched playoff spot; z – Clinched conference

== Schedule and results ==
=== Pre-season ===
2016 Pre-season Game Log: 3–3–0 (Home: 2–1–0; Road: 1–2–0)
#	Date	Visitor	Score	Home	OT	Decision	Attendance	Record	Recap
1	September 26 (in University Park, Pennsylvania)	Minnesota	2–1	Buffalo		Stalock	—	1–0–0	Recap
2	September 27	Colorado	4–1	Minnesota		Dubnyk	16,920	1–1–0	Recap
3	September 29	Minnesota	1–4	Winnipeg		Kuemper	15,294	1–2–0	Recap
4	October 2	Carolina	1–3	Minnesota		Dubnyk	18,665	2–2–0	Recap
5	October 4	Minnesota	0–2	Colorado		Stalock	—	2–3–0	Recap
6	October 8	Winnipeg	1–5	Minnesota		Dubnyk	18,302	3–3–0	Recap

=== Regular season ===
2016–17 Game Log

October: 6–2–1 (Home: 4–0–0; Road: 2–2–1)
#	Date	Visitor	Score	Home	OT	Decision	Attendance	Record	Pts	Recap
1	October 13	Minnesota	2–3	St. Louis		Dubnyk	19,673	0–1–0	0	Recap
2	October 15	Winnipeg	3–4	Minnesota		Dubnyk	19,024	1–1–0	2	Recap
3	October 18	Los Angeles	3–6	Minnesota		Kuemper	18,644	2–1–0	4	Recap
4	October 20	Toronto	2–3	Minnesota		Dubnyk	18,968	3–1–0	6	Recap
5	October 22	Minnesota	1–2	New Jersey	OT	Dubnyk	16,514	3–1–1	7	Recap
6	October 23	Minnesota	3–6	NY Islanders		Kuemper	11,583	3–2–1	7	Recap
7	October 25	Minnesota	5–0	Boston		Dubnyk	17,565	4–2–1	9	Recap
8	October 27	Minnesota	4–0	Buffalo		Dubnyk	18,122	5–2–1	11	Recap
9	October 29	Dallas	0–4	Minnesota		Dubnyk	19,031	6–2–1	13	Recap

November: 5–6–2 (Home: 3–3–0; Road: 2–3–2)
#	Date	Visitor	Score	Home	OT	Decision	Attendance	Record	Pts	Recap
10	November 1	Buffalo	2–1	Minnesota		Dubnyk	18,864	6–3–1	13	Recap
11	November 5	Minnesota	0–1	Colorado		Dubnyk	16,256	6–4–1	13	Recap
12	November 10	Minnesota	4–2	Pittsburgh		Dubnyk	18,458	7–4–1	15	Recap
13	November 12	Minnesota	2–3	Philadelphia		Dubnyk	19,591	7–5–1	15	Recap
14	November 13	Minnesota	2–1	Ottawa	OT	Kuemper	14,265	8–5–1	17	Recap
15	November 15	Calgary	1–0	Minnesota		Dubnyk	19,048	8–6–1	17	Recap
16	November 17	Boston	0–1	Minnesota		Dubnyk	18,774	9–6–1	19	Recap
17	November 19	Colorado	3–2	Minnesota		Dubnyk	19,238	9–7–1	19	Recap
18	November 21	Minnesota	2–3	Dallas	OT	Kuemper	18,532	9–7–2	20	Recap
19	November 23	Winnipeg	1–3	Minnesota		Dubnyk	19,022	10–7–2	22	Recap
20	November 25	Pittsburgh	2–6	Minnesota		Dubnyk	19,212	11–7–2	24	Recap
21	November 26	Minnesota	3–4	St. Louis	SO	Dubnyk	19,396	11–7–3	25	Recap
22	November 29	Minnesota	4–5	Vancouver		Kuemper	17,917	11–8–3	25	Recap

December: 12–1–1 (Home: 6–1–0; Road: 6–0–1)
#	Date	Visitor	Score	Home	OT	Decision	Attendance	Record	Pts	Recap
23	December 2	Minnesota	2–3	Calgary	SO	Dubnyk	18,390	11–8–4	26	Recap
24	December 4	Minnesota	2–1	Edmonton	OT	Dubnyk	18,347	12–8–4	28	Recap
25	December 7	Minnesota	3–2	Toronto		Dubnyk	18,944	13–8–4	30	Recap
26	December 9	Edmonton	2–3	Minnesota	SO	Dubnyk	19,019	14–8–4	32	Recap
27	December 11	St. Louis	1–3	Minnesota		Dubnyk	18,363	15–8–4	34	Recap
28	December 13	Florida	1–5	Minnesota		Dubnyk	18,754	16–8–4	36	Recap
29	December 15	Minnesota	5–2	Nashville		Dubnyk	17,113	17–8–4	38	Recap
30	December 17	Arizona	1–4	Minnesota		Kuemper	19,036	18–8–4	40	Recap
31	December 20	Colorado	0–2	Minnesota		Dubnyk	19,018	19–8–4	42	Recap
32	December 22	Minnesota	4–2	Montreal		Dubnyk	21,288	20–8–4	44	Recap
33	December 23	Minnesota	7–4	NY Rangers		Kuemper	18,006	21–8–4	46	Recap
34	December 27	Minnesota	3–2	Nashville	OT	Dubnyk	17,141	22–8–4	48	Recap
35	December 29	NY Islanders	4–6	Minnesota		Dubnyk	19,252	23–8–4	50	Recap
36	December 31	Columbus	4–2	Minnesota		Dubnyk	19,307	23–9–4	50	Recap

January: 10–2–1 (Home: 4–2–0; Road: 6–0–1)
#	Date	Visitor	Score	Home	OT	Decision	Attendance	Record	Pts	Recap
37	January 5	Minnesota	5–4	San Jose		Dubnyk	17,562	24–9–4	52	Recap
38	January 7	Minnesota	3–4	Los Angeles	OT	Kuemper	18,230	24–9–5	53	Recap
39	January 8	Minnesota	2–1	Anaheim		Dubnyk	15,645	25–9–5	55	Recap
40	January 12	Montreal	1–7	Minnesota		Dubnyk	19,104	26–9–5	57	Recap
41	January 14	Minnesota	5–4	Dallas		Kuemper	18,532	27–9–5	59	Recap
42	January 15	Minnesota	3–2	Chicago		Dubnyk	22,051	28–9–5	61	Recap
43	January 17	New Jersey	4–3	Minnesota		Dubnyk	19,051	28–10–5	61	Recap
44	January 19	Arizona	3–4	Minnesota		Dubnyk	19,027	29–10–5	63	Recap
45	January 21	Anaheim	3–5	Minnesota		Dubnyk	19,288	30–10–5	65	Recap
46	January 22	Nashville	4–2	Minnesota		Kuemper	19,087	30–11–5	65	Recap
47	January 24	Minnesota	3–2	Dallas	SO	Dubnyk	17,877	31–11–5	67	Recap
48	January 26	St. Louis	1–5	Minnesota		Dubnyk	19,064	32–11–5	69	Recap
January 27–29		All-Star Break in Los Angeles
49	January 31	Minnesota	5–2	Edmonton		Kuemper	18,347	33–11–5	71	Recap

February: 8–3–1 (Home: 5–2–1; Road: 3–1–0)
#	Date	Visitor	Score	Home	OT	Decision	Attendance	Record	Pts	Recap
50	February 1	Minnesota	1–5	Calgary		Dubnyk	18,044	33–12–5	71	Recap
51	February 4	Minnesota	6–3	Vancouver		Dubnyk	18,212	34–12–5	73	Recap
52	February 7	Minnesota	4–2	Winnipeg		Dubnyk	15,294	35–12–5	75	Recap
53	February 8	Chicago	4–3	Minnesota	OT	Kuemper	19,326	35–12–6	76	Recap
54	February 10	Tampa Bay	1–2	Minnesota	SO	Dubnyk	19,178	36–12–6	78	Recap
55	February 12	Detroit	3–6	Minnesota		Dubnyk	19,141	37–12–6	80	Recap
56	February 14	Anaheim	1–0	Minnesota		Dubnyk	19,047	37–13–6	80	Recap
57	February 16	Dallas	1–3	Minnesota		Kuemper	19,084	38–13–6	82	Recap
58	February 18	Nashville	2–5	Minnesota		Dubnyk	19,292	39–13–6	84	Recap
59	February 21	Chicago	5–3	Minnesota		Dubnyk	19,333	39–14–6	84	Recap
60	February 27	Los Angeles	4–5	Minnesota	OT	Dubnyk	19,118	40–14–6	86	Recap
61	February 28	Minnesota	6–5	Winnipeg		Dubnyk	15,294	41–14–6	88	Recap

March: 4–10–2 (Home: 3–4–1; Road: 1–6–1)
#	Date	Visitor	Score	Home	OT	Decision	Attendance	Record	Pts	Recap
62	March 2	Minnesota	0–1	Columbus		Dubnyk	15,987	41–15–6	88	Recap
63	March 5	San Jose	1–3	Minnesota		Dubnyk	19,168	42–15–6	90	Recap
64	March 7	St. Louis	2–1	Minnesota		Dubnyk	19,124	42–16–6	90	Recap
65	March 9	Minnesota	1–4	Tampa Bay		Dubnyk	19,092	42–17–6	90	Recap
66	March 10	Minnesota	7–4	Florida		Dubnyk	16,232	43–17–6	92	Recap
67	March 12	Minnesota	2–4	Chicago		Kuemper	22,147	43–18–6	92	Recap
68	March 14	Minnesota	2–4	Washington		Dubnyk	18,506	43–19–6	92	Recap
69	March 16	Minnesota	1–3	Carolina		Dubnyk	10,894	43–20–6	92	Recap
70	March 18	NY Rangers	3–2	Minnesota		Dubnyk	19,337	43–21–6	92	Recap
71	March 19	Minnesota	4–5	Winnipeg		Dubnyk	15,294	43–22–6	92	Recap
72	March 21	San Jose	2–3	Minnesota		Dubnyk	19,104	44–22–6	94	Recap
73	March 23	Philadelphia	3–1	Minnesota		Dubnyk	19,004	44–23–6	94	Recap
74	March 25	Vancouver	4–2	Minnesota		Kuemper	19,184	44–24–6	94	Recap
75	March 26	Minnesota	2–3	Detroit	OT	Dubnyk	20,027	44–24–7	95	Recap
76	March 28	Washington	5–4	Minnesota	OT	Dubnyk	19,188	44–24–8	96	Recap
77	March 30	Ottawa	1–5	Minnesota		Stalock	19,044	45–24–8	98	Recap

April: 4–1–0 (Home: 2–0–0; Road: 2–1–0)
#	Date	Visitor	Score	Home	OT	Decision	Attendance	Record	Pts	Recap
78	April 1	Minnesota	0–3	Nashville		Stalock	17,113	45–25–8	98	Recap
79	April 2	Colorado	2–5	Minnesota		Dubnyk	19,164	46–25–8	100	Recap
80	April 4	Carolina	3–5	Minnesota		Dubnyk	18,848	47–25–8	102	Recap
81	April 6	Minnesota	4–3	Colorado		Dubnyk	15,565	48–25–8	104	Recap
82	April 8	Minnesota	3–1	Arizona		Kuemper	17,490	49–25–8	106	Recap

Legend: Win (2 points) Loss (0 points) Overtime/shootout loss (1 point)

=== Playoffs ===
2017 Stanley Cup playoffs

Western Conference first round vs. (C3) St. Louis Blues: St. Louis wins 4–1
#	Date	Visitor	Score	Home	OT	Decision	Attendance	Series	Recap
1	April 12	St. Louis	2–1	Minnesota	OT	Dubnyk	19,168	0–1	Recap
2	April 14	St. Louis	2–1	Minnesota		Dubnyk	19,404	0–2	Recap
3	April 16	Minnesota	1–3	St. Louis		Dubnyk	19,334	0–3	Recap
4	April 19	Minnesota	2–0	St. Louis		Dubnyk	19,791	1–3	Recap
5	April 22	St. Louis	4–3	Minnesota	OT	Dubnyk	19,228	1–4	Recap

Legend: Win Loss

== Player statistics ==
Final Stats

=== Skaters ===
Regular season
Player	GP	G	A	Pts	+/−	PIM
Mikael Granlund	81	26	43	69	23	12
Eric Staal	82	28	37	65	17	34
Mikko Koivu	80	18	40	58	27	34
Nino Niederreiter	82	25	32	57	17	53
Charlie Coyle	82	18	38	56	13	36
Jason Zucker	79	22	25	47	34	30
Jason Pominville	78	13	34	47	2	4
Zach Parise	69	19	23	42	−3	30
Ryan Suter	82	9	31	40	34	36
Jared Spurgeon	76	10	28	38	33	20
Mathew Dumba	76	11	23	34	15	59
Erik Haula	72	15	11	26	5	28
Jonas Brodin	68	3	22	25	5	20
Chris Stewart	79	13	8	21	3	94
Jordan Schroeder	37	6	7	13	5	0
Martin Hanzal^{†}	20	4	9	13	−2	10
Marco Scandella	71	4	9	13	−2	25
Tyler Graovac	52	7	2	9	7	10
Christian Folin	51	2	6	8	10	26
Joel Eriksson Ek	15	3	4	7	1	4
Nate Prosser	39	2	5	7	0	12
Ryan White^{†}	19	2	1	3	−8	14
Zac Dalpe^{‡}	9	1	2	3	0	9
Gustav Olofsson	13	0	3	3	−1	2
Teemu Pulkkinen^{‡}	9	1	0	1	−1	2
Mike Reilly	17	1	0	1	1	2
Christoph Bertschy	5	0	1	1	0	4
Kurtis Gabriel	13	0	1	1	0	29
Patrick Cannone	3	0	0	0	0	0
Zack Mitchell	11	0	0	0	−1	0
Alex Tuch	6	0	0	0	−3	0

Playoffs
Player	GP	G	A	Pts	+/−	PIM
Zach Parise	5	2	1	3	−4	8
Ryan Suter	5	1	2	3	−3	10
Charlie Coyle	5	2	0	2	−1	2
Mikko Koivu	5	1	1	2	−1	0
Mikael Granlund	5	0	2	2	0	2
Martin Hanzal	5	1	0	1	−2	0
Jason Zucker	5	1	0	1	−1	2
Jonas Brodin	5	0	1	1	−3	0
Erik Haula	4	0	1	1	−2	0
Nino Niederreiter	5	0	1	1	−2	2
Jason Pominville	5	0	1	1	1	0
Nate Prosser	3	0	1	1	0	2
Jared Spurgeon	5	0	1	1	−1	0
Eric Staal	5	0	1	1	−1	0
Mathew Dumba	5	0	0	0	−1	2
Joel Eriksson Ek	3	0	0	0	0	0
Christian Folin	2	0	0	0	−2	2
Chris Stewart	5	0	0	0	0	0
Marco Scandella	5	0	0	0	−1	0
Ryan White	3	0	0	0	0	4

=== Goaltenders ===
Regular season
Player	GP	GS	TOI	W	L	OT	GA	GAA	SA	SV%	SO	G	A	PIM
Devan Dubnyk	65	63	3758:00	40	19	5	141	2.25	1842	.923	5	0	0	10
Darcy Kuemper	18	17	1053:02	8	5	3	55	3.13	562	.902	0	0	1	4
Alex Stalock	2	2	118:55	1	1	0	3	1.51	54	.944	0	0	0	0

Playoffs
Player	GP	GS	TOI	W	L	GA	GAA	SA	SV%	SO	G	A	PIM
Devan Dubnyk	5	5	322:15	1	4	10	1.86	133	.925	1	0	0	0

^{†}Denotes player spent time with another team before joining the Wild. Stats reflect time with the Wild only.
^{‡}Traded mid-season

== Awards and honours ==
=== Awards ===
Regular season
Player	Award	Awarded
D. Dubnyk	NHL Third Star of the Month	January 3, 2017
B. Boudreau	NHL All-Star game selection	January 10, 2017
D. Dubnyk	NHL All-Star game selection	January 10, 2017
R. Suter	NHL All-Star game selection	January 10, 2017

=== Milestones ===
Regular season
Player	Milestone	Reached
D. Dubnyk	300th Career NHL Game	October 15, 2016
J. Eriksson Ek	1st Career NHL Goal; 1st Career NHL Point	October 22, 2016
Z. Parise	300th Career NHL Goal	October 23, 2016
J. Eriksson Ek	1st Career NHL Assist	October 25, 2016
T. Graovac	1st Career NHL Goal; 1st Career NHL Point	October 29, 2016
E. Haula	200th Career NHL Game	November 12, 2016
M. Koivu	400th Career NHL Assist	November 21, 2016
J. Spurgeon	100th Career NHL Assist	December 2, 2016
K. Gabriel	1st Career NHL Assist; 1st Career NHL Point	December 7, 2016
E. Staal	800th Career NHL Point	December 11, 2016
C. Coyle	300th Career NHL Game	December 15, 2016
J. Zucker	200th Career NHL Game	December 20, 2016
J. Spurgeon	400th Career NHL Game	December 22, 2016
J. Brodin	300th Career NHL Game	January 5, 2017
M. Koivu	800th Career NHL Game	January 5, 2017
C. Folin	100th Career NHL Game	January 19, 2017
M. Dumba	200th Career NHL Game	January 26, 2017
Z. Parise	800th Career NHL Game	January 26, 2017
M. Granlund	1st Career NHL Hat Trick	February 4, 2017
G. Olofsson	1st Career NHL Assist; 1st Career NHL Point	February 12, 2017
J. Zucker	100th Career NHL Point	February 18, 2017
M. Koivu	600th Career NHL Point	February 18, 2017
M. Granlund	300th Career NHL Game	February 27, 2017
C. Stewart	300th Career NHL Point	February 28, 2017
R. White	300th Career NHL Game	March 9, 2017
M. Hanzal	200th Career NHL Assist	March 10, 2017
C. Coyle	100th Career NHL Assist	March 10, 2017
R. Suter	900th Career NHL Game	March 16, 2017
E. Staal	1,000th Career NHL Game	March 19, 2017
J. Pominville	900th Career NHL Game	March 30, 2017
M. Granlund	200th Career NHL Point	April 2, 2017

== Transactions ==
The Wild have been involved in the following transactions during the 2016–17 season.

=== Trades ===
Date	Details		Ref
February 1, 2017	To Ottawa Senators Marc Hagel	To Minnesota Wild Future considerations
February 26, 2017	To Arizona Coyotes 1st-round pick in 2017; 2nd-round pick in 2018; Conditional 4th-round pick in 2019; Grayson Downing	To Minnesota Wild Martin Hanzal; Ryan White; 4th-round pick in 2017
February 27, 2017	To Arizona Coyotes Teemu Pulkkinen	To Minnesota Wild Future considerations

=== Free agents acquired ===
Date	Player	Former team	Contract terms (in U.S. dollars)	Ref
July 1, 2016	Eric Staal	New York Rangers	3 years, $10.5 million	
July 1, 2016	Alex Stalock	San Jose Sharks	1 year, $650,000	
July 1, 2016	Chris Stewart	Anaheim Ducks	2 years, $2.3 million	
July 1, 2016	Pat Cannone	Chicago Wolves	1 year, $600,000	
July 1, 2016	Victor Bartley	Montreal Canadiens	1 year, $650,000	
February 26, 2017	Ryan Carter	Iowa Wild	1 year, $575,000	
February 28, 2017	Mike Weber	Iowa Wild	1 year, $1 million	
March 29, 2017	Justin Kloos	University of Minnesota	2 years, entry-level contract	

=== Free agents lost ===
Date	Player	New team	Contract terms (in U.S. dollars)	Ref
July 1, 2016	Thomas Vanek	Detroit Red Wings	1 year, $2.6 million	
October 16, 2016	Justin Fontaine	New York Rangers	1 year, $600,000	

=== Claimed via waivers ===
Player	Former team	Date claimed off waivers	Ref
Teemu Pulkkinen	Detroit Red Wings	October 11, 2016	

=== Lost via waivers ===
Player	New team	Date claimed off waivers	Ref
Zac Dalpe	Columbus Blue Jackets	February 27, 2017	

=== Player signings ===
Date	Player	Contract terms (in U.S. dollars)	Ref
June 29, 2016	Jason Zucker	2 years, $4 million	
June 30, 2016	Zac Dalpe	1 year, $600,000	
June 30, 2016	Tyler Graovac	2 year, $1.25 million	
July 5, 2016	Darcy Kuemper	1 year, $1.55 million	
July 11, 2016	Zach Palmquist	1 year, $660,000	
July 25, 2016	Jordan Schroeder	1 year, $650,000	
July 28, 2016	Matt Dumba	2 years, $5.1 million	
August 26, 2016	Gustav Bouramman	3 years, $2.4 million entry-level contract	
February 2, 2017	Alex Stalock	2 years, $1.3 million contract extension	
March 23, 2017	Luke Kunin	3 years, $4.275 million entry-level contract	
April 10, 2017	Carson Soucy	3 years, $1.85 million entry-level contract	

== Draft picks ==
Below are the Minnesota Wild's selections at the 2016 NHL entry draft, held on June 24–25, 2016 at the First Niagara Center in Buffalo.

Round	#	Player	Pos	Nationality	College/Junior/Club team (League)
1	15	Luke Kunin	C	United States	Wisconsin Badgers (Big Ten)
4	106	Brandon Duhaime	RW	United States	Tri-City Storm (USHL)
7	196	Dmitry Sokolov	RW	Russia	Sudbury Wolves (OHL)
7	204^{[a]}	Brayden Chizen	D	Canada	Kelowna Rockets (WHL)

Draft notes

- The Minnesota Wild's second-round pick went to the Chicago Blackhawks as the result of a trade on June 24, 2016 that sent Andrew Shaw to Montreal in exchange for a second-round pick in 2016 (39th overall) and this pick.

Montreal previously acquired this pick as the result of a trade on July 1, 2014 that sent Josh Gorges to Buffalo in exchange for this pick.

Buffalo previously acquired this pick as the result of a trade on March 5, 2014 that sent Matt Moulson and Cody McCormick to Minnesota in exchange for Torrey Mitchell, Winnipeg's second-round pick in 2014 and this pick.

The Minnesota Wild's third-round pick went to the Nashville Predators as the result of a trade on June 20, 2016 that sent Jimmy Vesey to Buffalo in exchange for this pick.

Buffalo previously acquired this pick as the result of a trade on February 29, 2016 that sent Jamie McGinn to Anaheim in exchange for this pick (being conditional at the time of the trade). The condition – Buffalo will receive a third-round pick in 2016 if Anaheim does not qualify for the 2016 Western Conference Final – was converted on April 27, 2016 when Anaheim was eliminated from the 2016 Stanley Cup playoffs.

Anaheim previously acquired this pick as the result of a trade on June 26, 2015 that sent Kyle Palmieri to New Jersey in exchange for Florida's second-round pick in 2015 and this pick (being conditional at the time of the trade). The condition – Anaheim will receive the higher of either Florida or Minnesota's third-round pick in 2016. – was converted on April 24, 2016 when Minnesota was eliminated from the 2016 Stanley Cup playoffs ensuring that the Wild's pick would be higher than Florida's.

New Jersey previously acquired this pick as the result of a trade on February 26, 2015 that sent Jaromir Jagr to Florida in exchange for a second-round pick in 2015 and this pick.

Florida previously acquired this pick as the result of a trade on February 24, 2015 that sent Sean Bergenheim and a seventh-round pick in 2016 to Minnesota in exchange for this pick.

- The Minnesota Wild's fifth-round pick went to the Boston Bruins as the result of a trade on June 27, 2015 that sent a fifth-round pick in 2015 to Minnesota in exchange for this pick.
- The Minnesota Wild's sixth-round pick went to the Calgary Flames as the result of a trade on February 29, 2016 that sent David Jones to Minnesota in exchange for Niklas Backstrom and this pick.
- ^{[a]} The Florida Panthers' seventh-round pick went to the Minnesota Wild as the result of a trade on February 24, 2015 that sent a third-round pick in 2016 to Florida in exchange for Sean Bergenheim and this pick.
