= 2016–17 San Jose Sharks season =

National Hockey League team season

2016–17 San Jose Sharks
- Division: 3rd Pacific
- Conference: 6th Western
- 2016–17 record: 46–29–7
- Home record: 26–11–4
- Road record: 20–18–3
- Goals for: 221
- Goals against: 201

Team information
- General manager: Doug Wilson
- Coach: Peter DeBoer
- Captain: Joe Pavelski
- Alternate captains: Logan Couture; Joe Thornton
- Arena: SAP Center
- Average attendance: 17,506
- Minor league affiliates: San Jose Barracuda (AHL); Allen Americans (ECHL)

Team leaders
- Goals: Brent Burns; Joe Pavelski (29)
- Assists: Brent Burns (47)
- Points: Brent Burns (76)
- Penalty minutes: Micheal Haley (128)
- Plus/minus: Brent Burns (+19)
- Wins: Martin Jones (35)
- Goals against average: Aaron Dell (2.00)

The 2016–17 San Jose Sharks season was the 26th season for the National Hockey League (NHL) franchise that was established on May 9, 1990. The Sharks failed to repeat their success of winning the Western Conference in 2016 after losing to Edmonton in the first round in six games.

== Standings ==
Pacific Division
Pos	Team	GP	W	L	OTL	ROW	GF	GA	GD	Pts
1	y – Anaheim Ducks	82	46	23	13	43	223	200	+23	105
2	x – Edmonton Oilers	82	47	26	9	43	247	212	+35	103
3	x – San Jose Sharks	82	46	29	7	44	221	201	+20	99
4	x – Calgary Flames	82	45	33	4	41	226	221	+5	94
5	Los Angeles Kings	82	39	35	8	37	201	205	−4	86
6	Arizona Coyotes	82	30	42	10	24	197	260	−63	70
7	Vancouver Canucks	82	30	43	9	26	182	243	−61	69

Source: National Hockey League
x – Clinched playoff spot; y – Clinched division

== Schedule ==
=== Pre-season ===
The preseason schedule was announced on June 16, 2016.

Pre-season game log: 3–2–1 (Home: 2–1–0; Road: 1–1–1)
#	Date	Visitor	Score	Home	OT	Decision	Attendance	Record	Recap
1	September 27	Vancouver	2–3	San Jose	OT	Armalis	14,865	1–0–0	Recap
2	September 30	Arizona	2–3	San Jose	OT	Dell	15,985	2–0–0	Recap
3	October 2	San Jose	3–2	Vancouver	OT	Jones	17,301	3–0–0	Recap
4	October 5	Anaheim	2–0	San Jose		Jones	16,207	3–1–0	Recap
5	October 7	San Jose	1–3	Arizona		Jones	7,235	3–2–0	Recap
6	October 9	San Jose	2–3	Anaheim	OT	Dell	16,444	3–2–1	Recap

=== Regular season ===
The schedule was announced on June 21, 2016.

Game log 46–29–7 (Home: 26–11–4; Road: 20–18–3)

October: 6–3–0 (Home: 4–0–0; Road: 2–3–0)
#	Date	Visitor	Score	Home	OT	Decision	Attendance	Record	Pts	Recap
1	October 12	Los Angeles	1–2	San Jose		Jones	17,562	1–0–0	2	Recap
2	October 15	San Jose	3–2	Columbus		Jones	16,546	2–0–0	4	Recap
3	October 17	San Jose	4–7	NY Rangers		Jones	18,200	2–1–0	4	Recap
4	October 18	San Jose	3–2	NY Islanders		Dell	10,772	3–1–0	6	Recap
5	October 20	San Jose	2–3	Pittsburgh		Jones	18,511	3–2–0	6	Recap
6	October 22	San Jose	0–3	Detroit		Jones	20,027	3–3–0	6	Recap
7	October 25	Anaheim	1–2	San Jose	OT	Jones	17,562	4–3–0	8	Recap
8	October 27	Columbus	1–3	San Jose		Jones	17,229	5–3–0	10	Recap
9	October 29	Nashville	1–4	San Jose		Jones	17,562	6–3–0	12	Recap

November: 8–6–1 (Home: 4–3–0; Road: 4–3–1)
#	Date	Visitor	Score	Home	OT	Decision	Attendance	Record	Pts	Recap
10	November 1	San Jose	2–3	Arizona		Jones	11,046	6–4–0	12	Recap
11	November 3	Calgary	3–2	San Jose		Jones	17,562	6–5–0	12	Recap
12	November 5	Pittsburgh	5–0	San Jose		Jones	17,562	6–6–0	12	Recap
13	November 8	San Jose	3–0	Washington		Jones	18,506	7–6–0	14	Recap
14	November 10	San Jose	4–2	Florida		Jones	11,703	8–6–0	16	Recap
15	November 12	San Jose	3–1	Tampa Bay		Jones	19,092	9–6–0	18	Recap
16	November 15	San Jose	0–1	Carolina		Dell	8,932	9–7–0	18	Recap
17	November 17	San Jose	2–3	St. Louis		Jones	17,618	9–8–0	18	Recap
18	November 19	San Jose	2–3	Arizona	OT	Jones	13,148	9–8–1	19	Recap
19	November 21	New Jersey	0–4	San Jose		Jones	17,286	10–8–1	21	Recap
20	November 23	Chicago	1–2	San Jose		Jones	17,501	11–8–1	23	Recap
21	November 25	NY Islanders	2–3	San Jose		Dell	17,562	12–8–1	25	Recap
22	November 26	Anaheim	3–2	San Jose		Jones	17,562	12–9–1	25	Recap
23	November 29	Arizona	1–2	San Jose	OT	Jones	17,377	13–9–1	27	Recap
24	November 30	San Jose	4–1	Los Angeles		Jones	18,230	14–9–1	29	Recap

December: 9–4–0 (Home: 5–1–0; Road: 4–3–0)
#	Date	Visitor	Score	Home	OT	Decision	Attendance	Record	Pts	Recap
25	December 2	Montreal	1–2	San Jose		Jones	17,562	15–9–1	31	Recap
26	December 7	Ottawa	4–2	San Jose		Jones	17,349	15–10–1	31	Recap
27	December 9	San Jose	2–3	Anaheim		Jones	17,174	15–11–1	31	Recap
28	December 10	Carolina	3–4	San Jose		Dell	17,562	16–11–1	33	Recap
29	December 13	San Jose	3–2	Toronto	SO	Jones	19,380	17–11–1	35	Recap
30	December 14	San Jose	4–3	Ottawa	SO	Jones	17,273	18–11–1	37	Recap
31	December 16	San Jose	4–2	Montreal		Jones	21,288	19–11–1	39	Recap
32	December 18	San Jose	1–4	Chicago		Jones	22,027	19–12–1	39	Recap
33	December 20	Calgary	1–4	San Jose		Jones	17,562	20–12–1	41	Recap
34	December 23	Edmonton	2–3	San Jose	OT	Jones	17,562	21–12–1	43	Recap
35	December 27	San Jose	3–2	Anaheim	OT	Jones	17,403	22–12–1	45	Recap
36	December 30	Philadelphia	0–2	San Jose		Dell	17,562	23–12–1	47	Recap
37	December 31	San Jose	2–3	Los Angeles		Jones	18,230	23–13–1	47	Recap

January: 9–4–1 (Home: 5–3–1; Road: 4–1–0)
#	Date	Visitor	Score	Home	OT	Decision	Attendance	Record	Pts	Recap
38	January 3	Los Angeles	2–1	San Jose		Jones	17,562	23–13–2	48	Recap
39	January 5	Minnesota	5–4	San Jose		Jones	17,562	23–14–2	48	Recap
40	January 7	Detroit	3–6	San Jose		Jones	17,562	24–14–2	50	Recap
41	January 10	San Jose	5–3	Edmonton		Jones	18,347	25–14–2	52	Recap
42	January 11	San Jose	2–3	Calgary		Dell	18,912	25–15–2	52	Recap
43	January 14	St. Louis	4–0	San Jose		Jones	17,562	25–16–2	52	Recap
44	January 16	Winnipeg	2–5	San Jose		Jones	17,479	26–16–2	54	Recap
45	January 18	San Jose	3–2	Los Angeles		Jones	18,230	27–16–2	56	Recap
46	January 19	Tampa Bay	1–2	San Jose		Dell	17,387	28–16–2	58	Recap
47	January 21	Colorado	2–3	San Jose	OT	Jones	17,562	29–16–2	60	Recap
48	January 23	San Jose	5–2	Colorado		Jones	13,803	30–16–2	62	Recap
49	January 24	San Jose	4–3	Winnipeg		Dell	15,294	31–16–2	64	Recap
50	January 26	Edmonton	4–1	San Jose		Jones	17,562	31–17–2	64	Recap
51	January 31	Chicago	1–3	San Jose		Jones	17,424	32–17–2	66	Recap

February: 5–1–5 (Home: 1–0–3; Road: 4–1–2)
#	Date	Visitor	Score	Home	OT	Decision	Attendance	Record	Pts	Recap
52	February 2	San Jose	4–1	Vancouver		Jones	18,865	33–17–2	68	Recap
53	February 4	Arizona	3–2	San Jose	SO	Jones	17,562	33–17–3	69	Recap
54	February 7	San Jose	4–5	Buffalo	OT	Jones	18,462	33–17–4	70	Recap
55	February 9	San Jose	3–6	Boston		Dell	17,565	33–18–4	70	Recap
56	February 11	San Jose	1–2	Philadelphia	OT	Dell	19,910	33–18–5	71	Recap
57	February 12	San Jose	4–1	New Jersey		Jones	16,514	34–18–5	73	Recap
58	February 15	Florida	6–5	San Jose	OT	Jones	17,562	34–18–6	74	Recap
59	February 18	San Jose	4–1	Arizona		Dell	17,446	35–18–6	76	Recap
60	February 19	Boston	2–1	San Jose	OT	Jones	17,562	35–18–7	77	Recap
61	February 25	San Jose	4–1	Vancouver		Jones	18,139	36–18–7	79	Recap
62	February 28	Toronto	1–3	San Jose		Jones	17,515	37–18–7	81	Recap

March: 6–10–0 (Home: 5–3–0; Road: 1–7–0)
#	Date	Visitor	Score	Home	OT	Decision	Attendance	Record	Pts	Recap
63	March 2	Vancouver	1–3	San Jose		Dell	17,488	38–18–7	83	Recap
64	March 5	San Jose	1–3	Minnesota		Jones	19,168	38–19–7	83	Recap
65	March 6	San Jose	3–2	Winnipeg		Dell	15,294	39–19–7	85	Recap
66	March 9	Washington	2–4	San Jose		Jones	17,562	40–19–7	87	Recap
67	March 11	Nashville	3–1	San Jose		Jones	17,497	40–20–7	87	Recap
68	March 12	Dallas	1–5	San Jose		Dell	17,442	41–20–7	89	Recap
69	March 14	Buffalo	1–4	San Jose		Jones	17,386	42–20–7	91	Recap
70	March 16	St. Louis	4–1	San Jose		Dell	17,402	42–21–7	91	Recap
71	March 18	Anaheim	2–1	San Jose		Jones	17,562	42–22–7	91	Recap
72	March 20	San Jose	0–1	Dallas		Dell	17,687	42–23–7	91	Recap
73	March 21	San Jose	2–3	Minnesota		Jones	19,104	42–24–7	91	Recap
74	March 24	San Jose	1–6	Dallas		Dell	17,265	42–25–7	91	Recap
75	March 25	San Jose	2–7	Nashville		Jones	17,282	42–26–7	91	Recap
76	March 28	NY Rangers	4–5	San Jose	OT	Jones	17,562	43–26–7	93	Recap
77	March 30	San Jose	2–3	Edmonton		Jones	18,347	43–27–7	93	Recap
78	March 31	San Jose	2–5	Calgary		Jones	19,289	43–28–7	93	Recap

April: 3–1–0 (Home: 2–1–0; Road: 1–0–0)
#	Date	Visitor	Score	Home	OT	Decision	Attendance	Record	Pts	Recap
79	April 2	San Jose	3–1	Vancouver		Jones	18,295	44–28–7	95	Recap
80	April 4	Vancouver	1–3	San Jose		Jones	17,459	45–28–7	97	Recap
81	April 6	Edmonton	4–2	San Jose		Jones	17,562	45–29–7	97	Recap
82	April 8	Calgary	1–3	San Jose		Dell	17,562	46–29–7	99	Recap

Legend: Win (2 points) Loss (0 points) Overtime/shootout loss (1 point)

=== Playoffs ===
The Sharks entered the playoffs as the Pacific Division's third seed and will face the second seed of the same division, the Edmonton Oilers.

2017 Stanley Cup playoffs

Western Conference First Round vs. (P2) Edmonton Oilers: Edmonton won series 4–2
#	Date	Visitor	Score	Home	OT	Decision	Attendance	Series	Recap
1	April 12	San Jose	3–2	Edmonton	OT	Jones	18,347	1–0	Recap
2	April 14	San Jose	0–2	Edmonton		Jones	18,347	1–1	Recap
3	April 16	Edmonton	1–0	San Jose		Jones	17,562	1–2	Recap
4	April 18	Edmonton	0–7	San Jose		Jones	17,562	2–2	Recap
5	April 20	San Jose	3–4	Edmonton	OT	Jones	18,347	2–3	Recap
6	April 22	Edmonton	3–1	San Jose		Jones	17,562	2–4	Recap

Legend Win Loss

== Player statistics ==
Skaters

Regular season
Player	GP	G	A	Pts	+/−	PIM
Brent Burns	82	29	47	76	+19	40
Joe Pavelski	81	29	39	68	+11	34
Logan Couture	73	25	27	52	+11	12
Joe Thornton	79	7	43	50	+7	51
Patrick Marleau	82	27	19	46	+4	28
Joel Ward	78	10	19	29	−2	30
Marc-Edouard Vlasic	75	6	22	28	+4	35
Mikkel Boedker	81	10	16	26	0	10
Paul Martin	81	4	22	26	+10	20
Chris Tierney	80	11	12	23	0	6
Melker Karlsson	67	11	11	22	+7	22
Tomas Hertl	49	10	12	22	−8	14
Kevin Labanc	55	8	12	20	+9	22
David Schlemko	62	2	16	18	+4	14
Joonas Donskoi	61	6	11	17	−5	10
Justin Braun	81	4	9	13	+1	28
Micheal Haley	58	2	10	12	+6	128
Brenden Dillon	81	2	8	10	−2	60
Tommy Wingels^{‡}	37	5	3	8	−2	15
Dylan DeMelo	25	1	7	8	+2	14
Jannik Hansen^{†}	15	2	5	7	0	7
Timo Meier	34	3	3	6	+1	10
Ryan Carpenter	11	2	2	4	+5	4
Marcus Sörensen	19	1	3	4	−1	4
Mirco Müller	4	1	1	2	+2	0
Matt Nieto^{‡}	16	0	2	2	−3	4
Daniel O'Regan	3	1	0	1	−2	0
Barclay Goodrow	3	0	1	1	0	0
Tim Heed	1	0	0	0	0	0
Nikolay Goldobin^{‡}	2	0	0	0	−1	0

Playoffs
Player	GP	G	A	Pts	+/−	PIM
Patrick Marleau	6	3	1	4	−1	0
Joe Pavelski	6	2	2	4	−1	0
Joel Ward	6	1	3	4	0	4
Logan Couture	6	2	1	3	−1	0
David Schlemko	6	2	1	3	+2	2
Marc-Edouard Vlasic	6	0	3	3	−1	2
Brent Burns	6	0	3	3	−1	6
Mikkel Boedker	4	1	1	2	0	2
Marcus Sörensen	6	1	1	2	+1	0
Joonas Donskoi	5	0	2	2	−3	0
Tomas Hertl	6	0	2	2	0	2
Joe Thornton	4	0	2	2	−1	0
Paul Martin	6	1	0	1	−1	4
Melker Karlsson	6	1	0	1	0	6
Brenden Dillon	6	0	1	1	+1	4
Jannik Hansen	6	0	1	1	0	0
Justin Braun	6	0	1	1	−1	0
Chris Tierney	6	0	1	1	0	0
Timo Meier	5	0	0	0	0	2

Goaltenders

Regular season
Player	GP	GS	TOI	W	L	OT	GA	GAA	SA	SV%	SO	G	A	PIM
Martin Jones	65	65	3800:21	35	23	6	152	2.40	1725	.912	2	0	0	0
Aaron Dell	20	17	1110:33	11	6	1	37	2.00	533	.931	1	0	0	0

Playoffs
Player	GP	GS	TOI	W	L	GA	GAA	SA	SV%	SO	G	A	PIM
Martin Jones	6	6	377:01	2	4	11	1.75	168	.935	1	0	0	0

^{†}Denotes player spent time with another team before joining the Sharks. Stats reflect time with the Sharks only.
^{‡}Traded mid-season

== Transactions ==
The Sharks have been involved in the following transactions during the 2016–17 season:

=== Trades ===
Date	Details		Ref
January 24, 2017	To Ottawa Senators Tommy Wingels	To San Jose Sharks Buddy Robinson; Zack Stortini; 7th-round pick in 2017
February 28, 2017	To Vancouver Canucks Nikolay Goldobin conditional 4th-round pick in 2017	To San Jose Sharks Jannik Hansen

=== Free agents acquired ===
Date	Player	Former team	Contract terms (in U.S. dollars)	Ref
July 1, 2016	David Schlemko	New Jersey Devils	4 years, $8.4 million	
July 1, 2016	Mikkel Boedker	Colorado Avalanche	4 years, $16 million	
July 11, 2016	Dan Kelly	Albany Devils	1 year, $575,000	
March 17, 2017	Tim Clifton	Quinnipiac University	2 years, $1,300,000	
March 30, 2017	Nick DeSimone	Union College	2 years, $1,850,000	
May 23, 2017	Radim Šimek	HC Bílí Tygři Liberec	1 year, $830,000	
May 23, 2017	Filip Sandberg	HV71	2 years, $1.5 million	

=== Free agents lost ===
Date	Player	New team	Contract terms (in U.S. dollars)	Ref
July 1, 2016	James Reimer	Florida Panthers	5 years, $17 million	
July 2, 2016	Roman Polak	Toronto Maple Leafs	1 year, $2.25 million	
July 3, 2016	Matt Tennyson	Carolina Hurricanes	1 year, $675,000	

=== Lost via waivers ===
Player	New team	Date claimed off waivers
Matt Nieto	Colorado Avalanche	January 5, 2017

=== Player signings ===
Date	Player	Contract terms (in U.S. dollars)	Ref
June 30, 2016	Tomas Hertl	2 years, $6 million	
July 1, 2016	Micheal Haley	1 year, $625,000	
July 1, 2016	Aaron Dell	2 years, $1.25 million	
July 11, 2016	Dylan DeMelo	2 years, $1.3 million	
July 14, 2016	Ryan Carpenter	1 year, $600,000	
July 18, 2016	Matt Nieto	1 year, $735,000	
November 22, 2016	Brent Burns	8 years, $64 million contract extension	
March 23, 2017	Noah Rod	3 years, $2.43 million entry-level	
May 9, 2017	Manuel Wiederer	3 years, $2.21 million entry-level	
May 12, 2017	Joonas Donskoi	2 years, $3.8 million contract extension	
May 12, 2017	Melker Karlsson	3 years, $6 million contract extension	
June 5, 2017	Troy Grosenick	2 years, $1.3 million contract extension	
June 17, 2017	Joakim Ryan	2 years, $1.3 million contract extension	
June 17, 2017	Ryan Carpenter	2 years, $1.3 million contract extension	
June 17, 2017	Tim Heed	2 years, $1.3 million contract extension	

== Draft picks ==
Below are the San Jose Sharks' selections at the 2016 NHL entry draft, held on June 24 and 25, 2016, at the First Niagara Center in Buffalo.

Round	#	Player	Pos	Nationality	College/Junior/Club team (League)
2	60	Dylan Gambrell	C	United States	Denver Pioneers (NCHC)
4	111	Noah Gregor	C	Canada	Moose Jaw Warriors (WHL)
5	150	Manuel Wiederer	C	Germany	Moncton Wildcats (QMJHL)
6	180	Mark Shoemaker	D	Canada	North Bay Battalion (OHL)
7	210	Joachim Blichfeld	W	Denmark	Malmö Redhawks (SHL)

== Awards ==
Regular season
Player	Award	Awarded
Brent Burns	NHL Third Star of the Week; All-Star; NHL Third Star of the Month	November 28, 2016; January 1, 2017; February 1, 2017
Martin Jones	NHL Third Star of the Week; All-Star	December 5, 2016; January 1, 2017
Patrick Marleau	NHL Second Star of the Week	January 30, 2017
Joe Pavelski	All-Star; NHL First Star of the Week	January 1, 2017; March 13, 2017
