= 2016–17 Carolina Hurricanes season =

National Hockey League team season

2016–17 Carolina Hurricanes
- Division: 7th Metropolitan
- Conference: 12th Eastern
- 2016–17 record: 36–31–15
- Home record: 23–12–6
- Road record: 13–19–9
- Goals for: 215
- Goals against: 236

Team information
- General manager: Ron Francis
- Coach: Bill Peters
- Captain: Vacant
- Alternate captains: Justin Faulk; Victor Rask; Jeff Skinner; Jordan Staal
- Arena: PNC Arena
- Average attendance: 11,152 (59.7%)
- Minor league affiliates: Charlotte Checkers (AHL); Florida Everblades (ECHL)

Team leaders
- Goals: Jeff Skinner (37)
- Assists: Elias Lindholm (34)
- Points: Jeff Skinner (63)
- Penalty minutes: Jordan Staal (38)
- Plus/minus: Jaccob Slavin; Brett Pesce (+23)
- Wins: Cam Ward (26)
- Goals against average: Eddie Lack (2.64)

The 2016–17 Carolina Hurricanes season was the 38th season for the National Hockey League (NHL) franchise that was established on June 22, 1979 (following seven seasons of play in the World Hockey Association), and 19th season since the franchise relocated from Hartford to start the 1997–98 NHL season. The Canes failed to make the playoffs for the eighth consecutive season.

== Standings ==
Metropolitan Division
Pos	Team	GP	W	L	OTL	ROW	GF	GA	GD	Pts
1	p – Washington Capitals	82	55	19	8	53	263	182	+81	118
2	x – Pittsburgh Penguins	82	50	21	11	46	282	234	+48	111
3	x – Columbus Blue Jackets	82	50	24	8	47	249	195	+54	108
4	x – New York Rangers	82	48	28	6	45	256	220	+36	102
5	New York Islanders	82	41	29	12	39	241	242	−1	94
6	Philadelphia Flyers	82	39	33	10	32	219	236	−17	88
7	Carolina Hurricanes	82	36	31	15	33	215	236	−21	87
8	New Jersey Devils	82	28	40	14	25	183	244	−61	70

Source: National Hockey League
p – Clinched Presidents' Trophy; x – Clinched playoff spot

Eastern Conference Wild Card
Pos	Div	Team	GP	W	L	OTL	ROW	GF	GA	GD	Pts
1	ME	x – New York Rangers	82	48	28	6	45	256	220	+36	102
2	AT	x – Toronto Maple Leafs	82	40	27	15	39	251	242	+9	95
3	ME	New York Islanders	82	41	29	12	39	241	242	−1	94
4	AT	Tampa Bay Lightning	82	42	30	10	38	234	227	+7	94
5	ME	Philadelphia Flyers	82	39	33	10	32	219	236	−17	88
6	ME	Carolina Hurricanes	82	36	31	15	33	215	236	−21	87
7	AT	Florida Panthers	82	35	36	11	30	210	237	−27	81
8	AT	Detroit Red Wings	82	33	36	13	24	207	244	−37	79
9	AT	Buffalo Sabres	82	33	37	12	31	201	237	−36	78
10	ME	New Jersey Devils	82	28	40	14	25	183	244	−61	70

Source: National Hockey League
x – Clinched playoff spot

== Schedule and results ==
=== Pre-season ===
2016 Pre-season Game Log: 4–2–1 (Home: 2–0–1; Road: 2–2–0)
#	Date	Visitor	Score	Home	OT	Decision	Attendance	Record	Recap
1	September 26	Carolina	2–1	Washington	OT	Nedeljkovic	13,850	1–0–0	Recap
2	September 27	Carolina	3–2	Tampa Bay		Ward	12,475	2–0–0	Recap
3	September 30	Tampa Bay	2–1	Carolina	OT	Leighton	6,610	2–0–1	Recap
4	October 2	Carolina	1–3	Minnesota		Nedeljkovic	18,665	2–1–1	Recap
5	October 4	Carolina	0–2	Buffalo		—	—	2–2–1	Recap
6	October 5	Buffalo	2–3	Carolina	SO	—	—	3–2–1	Recap
7	October 7	Washington	2–3	Carolina	SO	Ward	7,995	4–2–1	Recap

=== Regular season ===
2016–17 Game Log

October: 2–4–2 (Home: 1–1–0; Road: 1–3–2)
#	Date	Visitor	Score	Home	OT	Decision	Attendance	Record	Pts	Recap
1	October 13	Carolina	4–5	Winnipeg	OT	Ward	15,296	0–0–1	1	Recap
2	October 16	Carolina	3–4	Vancouver	OT	Lack	17,832	0–0–2	2	Recap
3	October 18	Carolina	2–3	Edmonton		Ward	18,347	0–1–2	2	Recap
4	October 20	Carolina	4–2	Calgary		Lack	17,652	1–1–2	4	Recap
5	October 22	Carolina	3–6	Philadelphia		Lack	19,668	1–2–2	4	Recap
6	October 25	Carolina	2–4	Detroit		Ward	20,027	1–3–2	4	Recap
7	October 28	NY Rangers	3–2	Carolina		Ward	18,680	2–3–2	6	Recap
8	October 30	Philadelphia	3–4	Carolina		Ward	10,353	2–4–2	6	Recap

November: 7–5–2 (Home: 5–2–0; Road: 2–3–2)
#	Date	Visitor	Score	Home	OT	Decision	Attendance	Record	Pts	Recap
9	November 1	Carolina	1–2	Ottawa	OT	Ward	13,049	2–4–3	7	Recap
10	November 5	Carolina	3–2	Nashville	SO	Ward	17,113	3–4–3	9	Recap
11	November 6	New Jersey	4–1	Carolina		Lack	8,650	3–5–3	9	Recap
12	November 8	Carolina	2–3	New Jersey	SO	Ward	12,179	3–5–4	10	Recap
13	November 10	Anaheim	4–2	Carolina		Ward	8,086	3–6–4	10	Recap
14	November 12	Washington	1–5	Carolina		Ward	12,436	4–6–4	12	Recap
15	November 15	San Jose	0–1	Carolina		Ward	8,932	5–6–4	14	Recap
16	November 18	Montreal	2–3	Carolina		Ward	12,101	6–6–4	16	Recap
17	November 20	Winnipeg	1–3	Carolina		Ward	10,809	7–6–4	18	Recap
18	November 22	Carolina	2–1	Toronto		Ward	18,893	8–6–4	20	Recap
19	November 24	Carolina	1–2	Montreal		Ward	21,288	8–7–4	20	Recap
20	November 26	Carolina	1–2	Ottawa		Ward	18,042	8–8–4	20	Recap
21	November 27	Florida	2–3	Carolina		Leighton	8,124	9–8–4	22	Recap
22	November 29	Carolina	2–3	NY Rangers		Ward	18,006	9–9–4	22	Recap

December: 7–4–3 (Home: 5–0–1; Road: 2–4–2)
#	Date	Visitor	Score	Home	OT	Decision	Attendance	Record	Pts	Recap
23	December 1	Carolina	1–2	Boston	SO	Ward	17,565	9–9–5	23	Recap
24	December 3	Carolina	2–4	NY Rangers		Leighton	18,006	9–10–5	23	Recap
25	December 4	Tampa Bay	0–1	Carolina		Ward	11,521	10–10–5	25	Recap
26	December 7	Carolina	5–6	Anaheim	SO	Ward	14,582	10–10–6	26	Recap
27	December 8	Carolina	3–1	Los Angeles		Ward	18,230	11–10–6	28	Recap
28	December 10	Carolina	3–4	San Jose		Ward	17,562	11–11–6	28	Recap
29	December 13	Vancouver	6–8	Carolina		Leighton	11,721	12–11–6	30	Recap
30	December 16	Washington	4–3	Carolina	SO	Ward	11,892	12–11–7	31	Recap
31	December 17	Buffalo	1–2	Carolina	SO	Ward	11,682	13–11–7	33	Recap
—	December 19	Detroit	—	Carolina	Postponed due to poor ice conditions, rescheduled to March 27, 2017
32	December 22	Carolina	3–1	Buffalo		Ward	18,863	14–11–7	35	Recap
33	December 23	Boston	2–3	Carolina	OT	Ward	12,924	15–11–7	37	Recap
34	December 28	Carolina	2–3	Pittsburgh		Ward	18,653	15–12–7	37	Recap
35	December 30	Chicago	2–3	Carolina		Ward	18,016	16–12–7	39	Recap
36	December 31	Carolina	1–3	Tampa Bay		Ward	19,092	16–13–7	39	Recap

January: 6–7–0 (Home: 5–3–0; Road: 1–4–0)
#	Date	Visitor	Score	Home	OT	Decision	Attendance	Record	Pts	Recap
37	January 3	New Jersey	3–1	Carolina		Ward	8,998	16–14–7	39	Recap
38	January 5	Carolina	4–2	St. Louis		Ward	19,090	17–14–7	41	Recap
39	January 6	Carolina	1–2	Chicago		Ward	21,822	17–15–7	41	Recap
40	January 8	Boston	3–4	Carolina	OT	Ward	11,820	18–15–7	43	Recap
41	January 10	Columbus	3–5	Carolina		Ward	9,351	19–15–7	45	Recap
42	January 13	Buffalo	2–5	Carolina		Ward	11,992	20–15–7	47	Recap
43	January 14	NY Islanders	4–7	Carolina		Ward	16,640	21–15–7	49	Recap
44	January 17	Carolina	1–4	Columbus		Ward	14,724	21–16–7	49	Recap
45	January 20	Pittsburgh	7–1	Carolina		Ward	17,312	21–17–7	49	Recap
46	January 21	Carolina	2–3	Columbus		Leighton	19,033	21–18–7	49	Recap
47	January 23	Carolina	1–6	Washington		Ward	18,506	21–19–7	49	Recap
48	January 26	Los Angeles	3–0	Carolina		Ward	10,486	21–20–7	49	Recap
January 27–29		All-Star Break in Los Angeles
49	January 31	Philadelphia	1–5	Carolina		Ward	13,577	22–20–7	51	Recap

February: 3–5–2 (Home: 2–3–1; Road: 1–2–1)
#	Date	Visitor	Score	Home	OT	Decision	Attendance	Record	Pts	Recap
50	February 3	Edmonton	1–2	Carolina		Ward	12,512	23–20–7	53	Recap
51	February 4	Carolina	5–4	NY Islanders	OT	Ward	14,153	24–20–7	55	Recap
52	February 7	Carolina	0–5	Washington		Lack	18,506	24–21–7	55	Recap
53	February 11	Carolina	2–5	Dallas		Ward	17,864	24–22–7	55	Recap
54	February 17	Colorado	2–1	Carolina	OT	Ward	11,456	24–22–8	56	Recap
55	February 19	Toronto	4–0	Carolina		Ward	10,004	24–23–8	56	Recap
56	February 21	Pittsburgh	3–1	Carolina		Ward	12,145	24–24–8	56	Recap
57	February 24	Ottawa	0–3	Carolina		Lack	11,327	25–24–8	58	Recap
58	February 26	Calgary	3–1	Carolina		Lack	14,112	25–25–8	58	Recap
59	February 28	Carolina	2–3	Florida	SO	Ward	10,839	25–25–9	59	Recap

March: 10–2–5 (Home: 5–1–3; Road: 5–1–2)
#	Date	Visitor	Score	Home	OT	Decision	Attendance	Record	Pts	Recap
60	March 1	Carolina	3–4	Tampa Bay	OT	Lack	19,092	25–25–10	60	Recap
61	March 3	Arizona	4–2	Carolina		Ward	10,827	25–26–10	60	Recap
62	March 5	Carolina	2–1	Arizona		Lack	10,224	26–26–10	62	Recap
63	March 7	Carolina	1–3	Colorado		Lack	11,700	26–27–10	62	Recap
64	March 9	NY Rangers	3–4	Carolina		Ward	11,404	27–27–10	64	Recap
65	March 11	Toronto	3–2	Carolina	OT	Ward	12,328	27–27–11	65	Recap
66	March 13	Carolina	8–4	NY Islanders		Ward	12,785	28–27–11	67	Recap
67	March 14	NY Islanders	3–2	Carolina	OT	Ward	8,707	28–27–12	68	Recap
68	March 16	Minnesota	1–3	Carolina		Lack	10,894	29–27–12	70	Recap
69	March 18	Nashville	2–4	Carolina		Lack	10,707	30–27–12	72	Recap
70	March 19	Carolina	3–4	Philadelphia	OT	Ward	19,517	30–27–13	73	Recap
71	March 21	Carolina	4–3	Florida		Ward	10,793	31–27–13	75	Recap
72	March 23	Carolina	4–1	Montreal		Lack	21,288	32–27–13	77	Recap
73	March 25	Carolina	3–1	New Jersey		Lack	15,088	33–27–13	79	Recap
74	March 27	Detroit	4–3	Carolina	OT	Lack	11,516	33–27–14	80	Recap
75	March 28	Detroit	1–4	Carolina		Ward	9,427	34–27–14	82	Recap
76	March 30	Columbus	1–2	Carolina	OT	Ward	11,881	35–27–14	84	Recap

April: 1–4–1 (Home: 0–2–1; Road: 1–2–0)
#	Date	Visitor	Score	Home	OT	Decision	Attendance	Record	Pts	Recap
77	April 1	Dallas	3–0	Carolina		Ward	14,201	35–28–14	84	Recap
78	April 2	Carolina	2–3	Pittsburgh		Lack	18,631	35–29–14	84	Recap
79	April 4	Carolina	3–5	Minnesota		Ward	18,848	35–30–14	84	Recap
80	April 6	NY Islanders	3–0	Carolina		Lack	9,769	35–31–14	84	Recap
81	April 8	St. Louis	5–4	Carolina	SO	Ward	13,509	35–31–15	85	Recap
82	April 9	Carolina	4–3	Philadelphia	SO	Lack	19,559	36–31–15	87	Recap

Legend: Win (2 points) Loss (0 points) Overtime/shootout loss (1 point)

== Player stats ==
As of April 9, 2017

=== Skaters ===
Regular season
Player	GP	G	A	Pts	+/−	PIM
Jeff Skinner	79	37	26	63	−3	28
Sebastian Aho	82	24	25	49	−1	26
Victor Rask	82	16	29	45	−10	16
Jordan Staal	75	16	29	45	−1	38
Elias Lindholm	72	11	34	45	−2	16
Teuvo Teravainen	81	15	27	42	−6	16
Lee Stempniak	82	16	24	40	2	32
Justin Faulk	75	17	20	37	−18	32
Jaccob Slavin	82	5	29	34	23	12
Derek Ryan	67	11	18	29	−8	22
Noah Hanifin	81	4	25	29	−19	26
Brett Pesce	82	2	18	20	23	20
Brock McGinn	57	7	9	16	−11	6
Ron Hainsey^{‡}	56	4	10	14	−16	17
Viktor Stalberg^{‡}	57	9	3	12	−6	33
Joakim Nordstrom	82	7	5	12	−12	17
Jay McClement	65	5	3	8	−8	18
Phillip Di Giuseppe	36	1	6	7	−12	15
Klas Dahlbeck	43	2	4	6	−12	30
Matt Tennyson	45	0	6	6	−13	6
Andrej Nestrasil	19	1	4	5	−3	2
Ryan Murphy	27	0	2	2	−11	8
Ty Rattie^{†‡}	5	0	2	2	−2	0
Lucas Wallmark	8	0	2	2	1	2
Bryan Bickell	11	1	0	1	−4	4
Valentin Zykov	2	1	0	1	1	0
Sergey Tolchinsky	2	0	1	1	0	0
Patrick Brown	14	0	0	0	−6	0
Martin Frk^{‡}	2	0	0	0	−3	0
Jakub Nakladal	3	0	0	0	−4	0
Andrew Poturalski	2	0	0	0	−3	0

=== Goaltenders ===
Regular season
Player	GP	GS	TOI	W	L	OT	GA	GAA	SA	SV%	SO	G	A	PIM
Cam Ward	61	61	3617:55	26	22	12	162	2.69	1711	.905	2	0	1	6
Eddie Lack	20	18	1089:51	8	7	3	48	2.64	492	.902	1	0	0	0
Michael Leighton	4	3	210:17	2	2	0	12	3.43	92	.870	0	0	1	0
Alex Nedeljkovic	1	0	29:57	0	0	0	0	0.00	17	1.000	0	0	0	2
Jorge Alves	1	0	0:08	0	0	0	0	0.00	0	n/a	0	0	0	0

^{†}Denotes player spent time with another team before joining the Hurricanes. Stats reflect time with the Hurricanes only.
^{‡}Denotes player was traded mid-season. Stats reflect time with the Hurricanes only.
Bold/italics denotes franchise record.

== Transactions ==
The Hurricanes have been involved in the following transactions during the 2016–17 season.

=== Trades ===
Date	Details		Ref
October 11, 2016	To Florida Panthers Brody Sutter	To Carolina Hurricanes Connor Brickley
February 21, 2017	To Montreal Canadiens Keegan Lowe	To Carolina Hurricanes Philip Samuelsson
February 23, 2017	To Pittsburgh Penguins Ron Hainsey	To Carolina Hurricanes Danny Kristo; 2nd-round pick in 2017
February 28, 2017	To Ottawa Senators Viktor Stalberg	To Carolina Hurricanes 3rd-round pick in 2017
April 28, 2017	To Chicago Blackhawks OTT's 3rd-round pick in 2017	To Carolina Hurricanes Scott Darling (rights)

=== Free agents acquired ===
Date	Player	Former team	Contract terms (in U.S. dollars)	Ref
July 1, 2016	Viktor Stalberg	New York Rangers	1 year, $1.5 million	
July 1, 2016	Andrew Miller	Charlotte Checkers	1 year, $650,000	
July 1, 2016	Lee Stempniak	Boston Bruins	2 years, $5 million	
July 3, 2016	Matt Tennyson	San Jose Sharks	1 year, $675,000	
September 7, 2016	Michael Leighton	Chicago Blackhawks	1 year, $700,000	
October 9, 2016	Jakub Nakladal	Calgary Flames	1 year, $600,000	

=== Free agents lost ===
Date	Player	New team	Contract terms (in U.S. dollars)	Ref
July 1, 2016	Riley Nash	Boston Bruins	2 years, $1.8 million	
July 1, 2016	Nathan Gerbe	New York Rangers	1 year, $600,000	
July 2, 2016	Chris Terry	Montreal Canadiens	1 year, $600,000	
July 2, 2016	Brad Malone	Washington Capitals	1 year, $575,000	
May 11, 2017	Erik Karlsson	Timrå IK	1-year	

=== Claimed via waivers ===
Player	Previous team	Date
Martin Frk	Detroit Red Wings	October 9, 2016
Klas Dahlbeck	Arizona Coyotes	October 11, 2016
Ty Rattie	St. Louis Blues	January 4, 2017

=== Lost via waivers ===
Player	New team	Date
Martin Frk	Detroit Red Wings	November 1, 2016
Ty Rattie	St. Louis Blues	February 19, 2017

=== Lost via retirement ===
Date	Player

=== Players released ===
Date	Player	Via	Ref
November 14, 2016	Jakub Nakladal	Termination of contract	

=== Player signings ===
Date	Player	Contract terms (in U.S. dollars)	Ref
June 28, 2016	Patrick Brown	1 year, $650,000	
July 9, 2016	Jake Bean	3 years, $2.4975 million entry-level contract	
July 9, 2016	Julien Gauthier	3 years, $2.4975 million entry-level contract	
July 12, 2016	Victor Rask	6 years, $24 million	
July 14, 2016	Brendan Woods	1 year, $650,000	
July 14, 2016	Keegan Lowe	1 year, $750,000	
July 14, 2016	Brody Sutter	1 year, $600,000	
July 14, 2016	Dennis Robertson	1 year, $650,000	
July 14, 2016	Ryan Murphy	2 years, $1.575 million	
March 16, 2017	Callum Booth	3 years, $2 million entry-level contract	
March 23, 2017	Janne Kuokkanen	3 years, $2.25 million entry-level contract	
March 31, 2017	Warren Foegele	3 years, $2.4 million entry-level contract	
March 31, 2017	Spencer Smallman	3 years, $2.275 million entry-level contract	
April 21, 2017	Klas Dahlbeck	1 year, $850,000 contract extension	
April 21, 2017	Steven Lorentz	3 years, $2.185 entry-level contract	
May 5, 2017	Scott Darling	4 years, $16.6 million contract extension	
June 13, 2017	Andrew Miller	1 year, $650,000 contract extension	
June 15, 2017	Teuvo Teravainen	2 years, $5.72 million contract extension	

== Draft picks ==
Below are the Carolina Hurricanes' selections at the 2016 NHL entry draft, was held June 24–25, 2016, at the First Niagara Center in Buffalo, New York.

Round	#	Player	Pos	Nationality	College/junior/club team (league)
1	13	Jake Bean	D	Canada	Calgary Hitmen (WHL)
1	21^{a}	Julien Gauthier	RW	Canada	Val d'Or Foreurs (QMJHL)
2	43	Janne Kuokkanen	LW	Finland	Karpat (Liiga)
3	67^{b}	Matt Filipe	LW	United States	Cedar Rapids RoughRiders (USHL)
3	74	Hudson Elynuik	C	Canada	Spokane Chiefs (WHL)
3	75^{c}	Jack LaFontaine	G	Canada	Janesville Jets (NAHL)
4	104	Max Zimmer	LW	United States	Chicago Steel (USHL)
5	134	Jeremy Helvig	G	United States	Kingston Frontenacs (OHL)
6	164	Noah Carroll	D	Canada	Guelph Storm (OHL)

Draft notes

- ^{a} The Los Angeles Kings' first-round pick went to the Carolina Hurricanes as the result of a trade on February 25, 2015, that sent Andrej Sekera to Los Angeles in exchange for Roland McKeown and this pick (being conditional at the time of the trade). The condition – Carolina will receive a first-round pick in 2016 if Los Angeles fails to qualify for the 2015 Stanley Cup playoffs – was converted on April 9, 2015.
- ^{b} The Winnipeg Jets' third round pick went to the Carolina Hurricanes as the result of a trade on February 25, 2015, that sent Jiri Tlusty to Winnipeg in exchange for a conditional sixth-round pick in 2015 and this pick.
- ^{c} The Boston Bruins' third-round pick went to the Carolina Hurricanes as the result of a trade on February 29, 2016, that sent John-Michael Liles to Boston in exchange for Anthony Camara, a fifth-round pick in 2017 and this pick.
- The Carolina Hurricanes' seventh-round pick went to the Vancouver Canucks as the result of a trade on June 27, 2015, that sent Eddie Lack to Carolina in exchange for a third-round pick in 2015 and this pick.
