= 2016–17 Columbus Blue Jackets season =

National Hockey League season

2016–17 Columbus Blue Jackets
- Division: 3rd Metropolitan
- Conference: 3rd Eastern
- 2016–17 record: 50–24–8
- Home record: 28–12–1
- Road record: 22–12–7
- Goals for: 249
- Goals against: 195

Team information
- General manager: Jarmo Kekäläinen
- Coach: John Tortorella
- Captain: Nick Foligno
- Alternate captains: Brandon Dubinsky; Boone Jenner
- Arena: Nationwide Arena
- Minor league affiliate: Cleveland Monsters (AHL)

Team leaders
- Goals: Cam Atkinson (35)
- Assists: Alexander Wennberg (46)
- Points: Cam Atkinson (62)
- Penalty minutes: Brandon Dubinsky (91)
- Plus/minus: David Savard (+33)
- Wins: Sergei Bobrovsky (41)
- Goals against average: Sergei Bobrovsky (2.06)

The 2016–17 Columbus Blue Jackets season was the 17th season for the National Hockey League (NHL) franchise that was established on June 25, 1997. This season marked the first time the Blue Jackets were in the Stanley Cup playoffs since the 2013–14 season.

== Regular season ==
The Blue Jackets finished October with a record of 3 wins, 3 regulation losses and an overtime loss, but in November they won 9, lost 2 in regulation and 3 in overtime. On November 29, 2016, the team began a winning streak that ran to 16 consecutive games, including a perfect 14-0-0 record in December, but ended on January 5, 2017, with a loss to the Washington Capitals. The 16 game winning streak was one short of the NHL record 17 games, set by the 1992–93 Pittsburgh Penguins.

== Standings ==
Metropolitan Division
Pos	Team	GP	W	L	OTL	ROW	GF	GA	GD	Pts
1	p – Washington Capitals	82	55	19	8	53	263	182	+81	118
2	x – Pittsburgh Penguins	82	50	21	11	46	282	234	+48	111
3	x – Columbus Blue Jackets	82	50	24	8	47	249	195	+54	108
4	x – New York Rangers	82	48	28	6	45	256	220	+36	102
5	New York Islanders	82	41	29	12	39	241	242	−1	94
6	Philadelphia Flyers	82	39	33	10	32	219	236	−17	88
7	Carolina Hurricanes	82	36	31	15	33	215	236	−21	87
8	New Jersey Devils	82	28	40	14	25	183	244	−61	70

Source: National Hockey League
p – Clinched Presidents' Trophy; x – Clinched playoff spot

== Schedule and results ==
=== Pre-season ===
2016 Pre-season game log: 4–4–0 (home: 1–3–0; road: 3–1–0)
#	Date	Visitor	Score	Home	OT	Decision	Attendance	Record	Recap
1	September 25^{[A]}	St. Louis	5–0	Columbus		Forsberg	8,574	0–1–0	Recap
2	September 25^{[A]}	Columbus	3–7	St. Louis		Korpisalo	10,394	0–2–0	Recap
3	September 26	Columbus	3–2	Boston	SO	McElhinney	16,285	1–2–0	Recap
4	September 29	Nashville	2–3	Columbus	OT	McElhinney	8,644	2–2–0	Recap
5	October 2	Pittsburgh	0–2	Columbus		Bobrovsky	11,966	2–3–0	Recap
6	October 4	Columbus	3–2	Nashville	OT	Korpisalo	16,432	3–3–0	Recap
7	October 6	Boston	2–1	Columbus		Bobrovsky	8,851	3–4–0	Recap
8	October 8	Columbus	5–3	Pittsburgh		Bobrovsky	18,258	4–4–0	Recap
^{A} – indicates split-squad game.

=== Regular season ===
2016–17 game log

October: 3–3–1 (home: 1–2–0; road: 2–1–1)
#	Date	Visitor	Score	Home	OT	Decision	Attendance	Record	Pts	Recap
1	October 13	Boston	6–3	Columbus		Bobrovsky	18,144	0–1–0	0	Recap
2	October 15	San Jose	3–2	Columbus		Bobrovsky	16,546	0–2–0	0	Recap
3	October 21	Chicago	2–3	Columbus		Bobrovsky	15,789	1–2–0	2	Recap
4	October 22	Columbus	3–0	Dallas		Bobrovsky	18,532	2–2–0	4	Recap
5	October 25	Columbus	2–3	Los Angeles	OT	Bobrovsky	18,230	2–2–1	5	Recap
6	October 27	Columbus	1–3	San Jose		Bobrovsky	17,229	2–3–1	5	Recap
7	October 28	Columbus	4–0	Anaheim		Bobrovsky	15,841	3–3–1	7	Recap

November: 9–2–3 (home: 7–1–1; road: 2–1–2)
#	Date	Visitor	Score	Home	OT	Decision	Attendance	Record	Pts	Recap
8	November 1	Dallas	2–3	Columbus	OT	Bobrovsky	10,141	4–3–1	9	Recap
9	November 4	Montreal	0–10	Columbus		Bobrovsky	14,436	5–3–1	11	Recap
10	November 5	Columbus	1–2	St. Louis	OT	McElhinney	18,245	5–3–2	12	Recap
11	November 9	Anaheim	2–3	Columbus	OT	Bobrovsky	10,250	6–3–2	14	Recap
12	November 10	Columbus	2–5	Boston		Bobrovsky	17,565	6–4–2	14	Recap
13	November 12	St. Louis	4–8	Columbus		Bobrovsky	15,788	7–4–2	16	Recap
14	November 15	Washington	1–2	Columbus	OT	Bobrovsky	11,738	8–4–2	18	Recap
15	November 18	NY Rangers	2–4	Columbus		Bobrovsky	14,541	9–4–2	20	Recap
16	November 20	Columbus	3–2	Washington		Bobrovsky	18,506	10–4–2	22	Recap
17	November 21	Colorado	3–2	Columbus	OT	McElhinney	10,063	10–4–3	23	Recap
18	November 23	Calgary	2–0	Columbus		Bobrovsky	13,140	10–5–3	23	Recap
19	November 25	Columbus	5–3	Tampa Bay		Bobrovsky	19,092	11–5–3	25	Recap
20	November 26	Columbus	1–2	Florida	SO	Bobrovsky	13,573	11–5–4	26	Recap
21	November 29	Tampa Bay	1–5	Columbus		Bobrovsky	10,366	12–5–4	28	Recap

December: 14–0–0 (home: 6–0–0; road: 8–0–0)
#	Date	Visitor	Score	Home	OT	Decision	Attendance	Record	Pts	Recap
22	December 1	Columbus	3–2	Colorado		Bobrovsky	12,141	13–5–4	30	Recap
23	December 3	Columbus	3–2	Arizona	SO	McElhinney	11,287	14–5–4	32	Recap
24	December 5	Arizona	1–4	Columbus		Bobrovsky	11,091	15–5–4	34	Recap
25	December 9	Columbus	4–1	Detroit		Bobrovsky	20,027	16–5–4	36	Recap
26	December 10	NY Islanders	2–6	Columbus		Bobrovsky	16,928	17–5–4	38	Recap
27	December 13	Columbus	3–1	Edmonton		Bobrovsky	18,347	18–5–4	40	Recap
28	December 16	Columbus	4–1	Calgary		Bobrovsky	18,045	19–5–4	42	Recap
29	December 18	Columbus	4–3	Vancouver	OT	Bobrovsky	18,113	20–5–4	44	Recap
30	December 20	Los Angeles	2–3	Columbus	SO	McElhinney	16,568	21–5–4	46	Recap
31	December 22	Pittsburgh	1–7	Columbus		Bobrovsky	19,115	22–5–4	48	Recap
32	December 23	Montreal	1–2	Columbus		Bobrovsky	18,147	23–5–4	50	Recap
33	December 27	Boston	3–4	Columbus		Bobrovsky	19,005	24–5–4	52	Recap
34	December 29	Columbus	5–3	Winnipeg		Bobrovsky	15,294	25–5–4	54	Recap
35	December 31	Columbus	4–2	Minnesota		Bobrovsky	19,307	26–5–4	56	Recap

January: 7–7–0 (home: 4–2–0; road: 3–5–0)
#	Date	Visitor	Score	Home	OT	Decision	Attendance	Record	Pts	Recap
36	January 3	Edmonton	1–3	Columbus		Bobrovsky	17,169	27–5–4	58	Recap
37	January 5	Columbus	0–5	Washington		Bobrovsky	18,506	27–6–4	58	Recap
38	January 7	NY Rangers	5–4	Columbus		McElhinney	19,001	27–7–4	58	Recap
39	January 8	Philadelphia	1–2	Columbus	OT	Bobrovsky	17,962	28–7–4	60	Recap
40	January 10	Columbus	3–5	Carolina		Forsberg	9,351	28–8–4	60	Recap
41	January 13	Columbus	3–1	Tampa Bay		Korpisalo	19,092	29–8–4	62	Recap
42	January 14	Columbus	3–4	Florida		Korpisalo	14,795	29–9–4	62	Recap
43	January 17	Carolina	1–4	Columbus		Bobrovsky	14,724	30–9–4	64	Recap
44	January 19	Ottawa	2–0	Columbus		Bobrovsky	15,823	30–10–4	64	Recap
45	January 21	Carolina	2–3	Columbus		Bobrovsky	19,033	31–10–4	66	Recap
46	January 22	Columbus	7–6	Ottawa	OT	Korpisalo	16,702	32–10–4	68	Recap
47	January 24	Columbus	2–4	NY Islanders		Bobrovsky	11,419	32–11–4	68	Recap
48	January 26	Columbus	3–4	Nashville		Bobrovsky	17,113	32–12–4	68	Recap
January 27–29		All-Star Break in Los Angeles
49	January 31	Columbus	6–4	NY Rangers		Korpisalo	18,006	33–12–4	70	Recap

February: 6–4–2 (home: 4–4–0; road: 2–0–2)
#	Date	Visitor	Score	Home	OT	Decision	Attendance	Record	Pts	Recap
50	February 3	Columbus	3–4	Pittsburgh	OT	Bobrovsky	18,649	33–12–5	71	Recap
51	February 4	New Jersey	5–1	Columbus		Bobrovsky	18,566	33–13–5	71	Recap
52	February 7	Columbus	3–2	Detroit	OT	Bobrovsky	20,027	34–13–5	73	Recap
53	February 9	Vancouver	3–0	Columbus		Bobrovsky	13,979	34–14–5	73	Recap
54	February 11	Detroit	1–2	Columbus		Bobrovsky	19,143	35–14–5	75	Recap
55	February 13	NY Rangers	3–2	Columbus		Bobrovsky	14,378	35–15–5	75	Recap
56	February 15	Toronto	2–5	Columbus		Korpisalo	14,548	36–15–5	77	Recap
57	February 17	Pittsburgh	1–2	Columbus	OT	Bobrovsky	19,188	37–15–5	79	Recap
58	February 19	Nashville	4–3	Columbus		Bobrovsky	17,894	37–16–5	79	Recap
59	February 25	NY Islanders	0–7	Columbus		Korpisalo	18,183	38–16–5	81	Recap
60	February 26	Columbus	5–2	NY Rangers		Bobrovsky	18,006	39–16–5	83	Recap
61	February 28	Columbus	0–1	Montreal	OT	Bobrovsky	21,288	39–16–6	84	Recap

March: 10–4–2 (home: 6–1–0; road: 4–3–2)
#	Date	Visitor	Score	Home	OT	Decision	Attendance	Record	Pts	Recap
62	March 2	Minnesota	0–1	Columbus		Bobrovsky	15,987	40–16–6	86	Recap
63	March 4	Columbus	2–3	Ottawa		Korpisalo	17,516	40–17–6	86	Recap
64	March 5	Columbus	3–0	New Jersey		Bobrovsky	14,054	41–17–6	88	Recap
65	March 7	New Jersey	0–2	Columbus		Bobrovsky	15,947	42–17–6	90	Recap
66	March 10	Buffalo	3–4	Columbus		Bobrovsky	17,530	43–17–6	92	Recap
67	March 11	Columbus	3–5	Buffalo		Korpisalo	18,744	43–18–6	92	Recap
68	March 13	Columbus	5–3	Philadelphia		Bobrovsky	19,447	44–18–6	94	Recap
69	March 16	Florida	1–2	Columbus		Bobrovsky	14,921	45–18–6	96	Recap
70	March 18	Columbus	3–2	NY Islanders	OT	Korpisalo	14,007	46–18–6	98	Recap
71	March 19	Columbus	4–1	New Jersey		Bobrovsky	14,254	47–18–6	100	Recap
72	March 22	Toronto	5–2	Columbus		Korpisalo	16,106	47–19–6	100	Recap
73	March 23	Columbus	1–2	Washington	SO	Bobrovsky	18,506	47–19–7	101	Recap
74	March 25	Philadelphia	0–1	Columbus		Bobrovsky	19,052	48–19–7	103	Recap
75	March 28	Buffalo	1–3	Columbus		Bobrovsky	14,533	49–19–7	105	Recap
76	March 30	Columbus	1–2	Carolina	OT	Korpisalo	11,881	49–19–8	106	Recap
77	March 31	Columbus	1–3	Chicago		Bobrovsky	22,112	49–20–8	106	Recap

April: 1–4–0 (home: 0–2–0; road: 1–2–0)
#	Date	Visitor	Score	Home	OT	Decision	Attendance	Record	Pts	Recap
78	April 2	Washington	3–2	Columbus		Bobrovsky	18,247	49–21–8	106	Recap
79	April 4	Columbus	1–4	Pittsburgh		Bobrovsky	18,632	49–22–8	106	Recap
80	April 6	Winnipeg	5–4	Columbus		Korpisalo	16,477	49–23–8	106	Recap
81	April 8	Columbus	2–4	Philadelphia		Bobrovsky	19,789	49–24–8	106	Recap
82	April 9	Columbus	3–2	Toronto		Korpisalo	19,369	50–24–8	108	Recap

Legend: Win (2 points) Loss (0 points) Overtime/shootout loss (1 point)

== Playoffs ==
The Blue Jackets clinched the playoffs for the first time since the 2013–14 season. They met the Pittsburgh Penguins in the first round and lost the series 4–1.

2017 Stanley Cup playoffs

Eastern Conference first round vs. (M2) Pittsburgh Penguins: Pittsburgh won 4–1
#	Date	Visitor	Score	Home	OT	Decision	Attendance	Series	Recap
1	April 12	Columbus	1–3	Pittsburgh		Bobrovsky	18,563	0–1	Recap
2	April 14	Columbus	1–4	Pittsburgh		Bobrovsky	18,622	0–2	Recap
3	April 16	Pittsburgh	5–4	Columbus	OT	Bobrovsky	19,092	0–3	Recap
4	April 18	Pittsburgh	4–5	Columbus		Bobrovsky	19,093	1–3	Recap
5	April 20	Columbus	2–5	Pittsburgh		Bobrovsky	18,585	1–4	Recap

Legend: Win Loss

== Player statistics ==
Final Stats

Skaters

Regular season
Player	GP	G	A	Pts	+/−	PIM
Cam Atkinson	82	35	27	62	13	22
Alexander Wennberg	80	13	46	59	9	21
Brandon Saad	82	24	29	53	23	8
Nick Foligno	79	26	25	51	−4	55
Sam Gagner	81	18	32	50	10	22
Zach Werenski	78	11	36	47	17	14
Seth Jones	75	12	30	42	6	24
Brandon Dubinsky	80	12	29	41	16	91
Scott Hartnell	78	13	24	37	14	63
Boone Jenner	82	18	16	34	14	52
Josh Anderson	78	17	12	29	12	89
William Karlsson	81	6	19	25	10	10
David Savard	74	6	17	23	33	44
Jack Johnson	82	5	18	23	23	32
Matt Calvert	65	10	5	15	−4	48
Lukas Sedlak	62	7	6	13	10	25
Oliver Bjorkstrand	26	6	7	13	4	6
Ryan Murray	60	2	9	11	3	24
Markus Nutivaara	66	2	5	7	7	6
Kyle Quincey^{†}	20	2	1	3	0	12
Scott Harrington	22	1	2	3	3	10
Dalton Prout^{‡}	15	0	3	3	4	14
Markus Hannikainen	10	1	1	2	0	6
Gabriel Carlsson	2	0	1	1	−2	0
Lauri Korpikoski^{†}	9	0	0	0	0	0
Sonny Milano	4	0	0	0	−3	0
T. J. Tynan	3	0	0	0	−1	0

Playoffs
Player	GP	G	A	Pts	+/−	PIM
Cam Atkinson	5	2	1	3	−3	0
Boone Jenner	5	2	1	3	−2	14
William Karlsson	5	2	1	3	4	0
Brandon Saad	5	1	2	3	−5	0
Josh Anderson	5	1	1	2	2	2
Matt Calvert	4	1	1	2	4	4
Brandon Dubinsky	5	1	1	2	−2	6
Jack Johnson	5	1	1	2	−3	0
Markus Nutivaara	2	1	1	2	3	0
Nick Foligno	4	0	2	2	−3	6
Sam Gagner	5	0	2	2	−3	2
Seth Jones	5	0	2	2	−4	0
Zach Werenski	3	1	0	1	−2	0
Oliver Bjorkstrand	5	0	1	1	−2	0
Kyle Quincey	2	0	1	1	−1	2
David Savard	5	0	1	1	−4	4
Alexander Wennberg	5	0	1	1	−3	2
Gabriel Carlsson	5	0	0	0	1	0
Scott Harrington	3	0	0	0	0	10
Scott Hartnell	4	0	0	0	−2	0
Sonny Milano	1	0	0	0	0	0
Lukas Sedlak	2	0	0	0	−1	0

Goaltenders

Regular season
Player	GP	GS	TOI	W	L	OT	GA	GAA	SA	SV%	SO	G	A	PIM
Sergei Bobrovsky	63	63	3707:04	41	17	5	127	2.06	1,854	.931	7	0	0	8
Joonas Korpisalo	14	13	790:31	7	5	1	38	2.88	401	.905	1	0	0	0
Curtis McElhinney^{‡}	7	5	375:55	2	1	2	15	2.39	198	.924	0	0	0	0
Anton Forsberg	1	1	58:35	0	1	0	4	4.10	27	.852	0	0	0	0

Playoffs
Player	GP	GS	TOI	W	L	OT	GA	GAA	SA	SV%	SO	G	A	PIM
Sergei Bobrovsky	5	4	309:15	1	3	1	20	3.88	170	.882	0	0	0	0

^{†}Denotes player spent time with another team before joining the Blue Jackets. Statistics reflect time with the Blue Jackets only.
^{‡}Denotes player was traded mid-season. Statistics reflect time with the Blue Jackets only.
Bold/italics denotes franchise record.

== Transactions ==
The Blue Jackets have been involved in the following transactions during the 2016–17 season.

=== Trades ===
Date	Details		Ref
June 25, 2016	To Toronto Maple Leafs Kerby Rychel	To Columbus Blue Jackets Scott Harrington conditional 5th-round pick in 2017
November 28, 2016	To Colorado Avalanche Cody Goloubef	To Columbus Blue Jackets Ryan Stanton
March 1, 2017	To New Jersey Devils Dalton Prout	To Columbus Blue Jackets Kyle Quincey
March 1, 2017	To Dallas Stars Dillon Heatherington	To Columbus Blue Jackets Lauri Korpikoski

=== Free agents acquired ===
Date	Player	Former team	Contract terms (in U.S. dollars)	Ref
July 1, 2016	Dante Salituro	Ottawa 67's	3 years, $2.2 million entry-level contract	
July 5, 2016	Jacob Graves	London Knights	3 years, $2.775 million entry-level contract	
August 1, 2016	Sam Gagner	Philadelphia Flyers	1 year, $650,000	
February 28, 2017	Marc-Andre Bergeron	No team	1 year, $575,000	
March 16, 2017	Sam Vigneault	Clarkson University	2 years, $1.85 million entry-level contract	
May 25, 2017	Matiss Kivlenieks	Sioux City Musketeers	3 years, $3.2 million entry-level	

=== Free agents lost ===
Date	Player	New team	Contract terms (in U.S. dollars)	Ref
July 1, 2016	Michael Chaput	Vancouver Canucks	1 year, $600,000	
July 1, 2016	Fedor Tyutin	Colorado Avalanche	1 year, $2 million	
July 1, 2016	Justin Falk	Buffalo Sabres	1 year, $650,000	
July 5, 2016	Jared Boll	Anaheim Ducks	2 years, $1.8 million	
October 10, 2016	Rene Bourque	Colorado Avalanche	1 year, $650,000	
May 7, 2017	Daniel Zaar	Malmö Redhawks	2-year	

=== Claimed via waivers ===
Player	Old team	Date claimed off waivers	Ref
Zac Dalpe	Minnesota Wild	February 27, 2017	

=== Lost via waivers ===
Player	New team	Date claimed off waivers	Ref
Curtis McElhinney	Toronto Maple Leafs	January 10, 2017	

=== Player signings ===
Date	Player	Contract terms (in U.S. dollars)	Ref
June 29, 2016	Seth Jones	6 years, $32.4 million	
July 1, 2016	Pierre-Luc Dubois	3 years, $10.275 million entry-level contract	
July 25, 2016	Alex Broadhurst	1 year, $600,000	
July 25, 2016	T. J. Tynan	1 year, $600,000	
July 25, 2016	Scott Harrington	1 year, $632,500	
December 23, 2016	Vitaly Abramov	3 years, $2.775 million entry-level contract	
December 30, 2016	Calvin Thurkauf	3 years, $2.215 million entry-level contract	
March 21, 2017	Lukas Sedlak	2 years, $1.65 million contract extension	
March 21, 2017	Scott Harrington	2 years, $1.35 million contract extension	
March 21, 2017	Markus Hannikainen	2 years, $1.35 million contract extension	
April 5, 2017	Ryan Collins	3 years, $2.775 million entry-level contract	
May 23, 2017	Kevin Stenlund	3 years, $2.775 million entry-level contract	
June 9, 2017	Joonas Korpisalo	2 years, $1.8 million contract extension	
June 9, 2017	Zac Dalpe	2 years, two-way contract extension	
June 9, 2017	Dean Kukan	1 year, two-way contract extension	

== Draft picks ==
Below are the Columbus Blue Jackets' selections at the 2016 NHL entry draft, held June 24–25, 2016 at the First Niagara Center in Buffalo, New York.

Round	#	Player	Pos	Nationality	College/Junior/Club team (League)
1	3	Pierre-Luc Dubois	LW	Canada	Cape Breton Screaming Eagles (QMJHL)
2	34	Andrew Peeke	D	United States	Green Bay Gamblers (USHL)
3	65	Vitaly Abramov	RW	Russia	Gatineau Olympiques (QMJHL)
6	155	Peter Thome	G	United States	Aberdeen Wings (NAHL)
7	185	Calvin Thurkauf	C	Switzerland	Kelowna Rockets (WHL)

Notes

- The Columbus Blue Jackets' fourth-round pick went to the New York Islanders as the result of a trade on June 25, 2016, that sent a fourth-round pick in 2016 (110th overall) and a sixth-round pick in 2017 to Chicago in exchange for this pick.
  - Chicago previously acquired this pick as the result of a trade on June 30, 2015, that sent Brandon Saad, Michael Paliotta and Alex Broadhurst to Columbus in exchange for Artem Anisimov, Jeremy Morin, Corey Tropp, Marko Dano and this pick.
- The Columbus Blue Jackets' fifth-round pick went to the St. Louis Blues as the result of a trade on November 15, 2014, that sent Jordan Leopold to Columbus in exchange for this pick.
