= 2016–17 Winnipeg Jets season =

National Hockey League team season

2016–17 Winnipeg Jets
- Division: 5th Central
- Conference: 9th Western
- 2016–17 record: 40–35–7
- Home record: 22–18–1
- Road record: 18–17–6
- Goals for: 249
- Goals against: 256

Team information
- General manager: Kevin Cheveldayoff
- Coach: Paul Maurice
- Captain: Blake Wheeler
- Alternate captains: Dustin Byfuglien; Mark Scheifele
- Arena: MTS Centre
- Average attendance: 15,731 (107.5%) (41 games)
- Minor league affiliates: Manitoba Moose (AHL); Tulsa Oilers (ECHL)

Team leaders
- Goals: Patrik Laine (36)
- Assists: Mark Scheifele (50)
- Points: Mark Scheifele (82)
- Penalty minutes: Dustin Byfuglien (117)
- Plus/minus: Mark Scheifele (+18)
- Wins: Connor Hellebuyck (26)
- Goals against average: Connor Hellebuyck (2.89)

The 2016–17 Winnipeg Jets season was the 34th season of play for the National Hockey League (NHL) franchise that was established on June 22, 1979, and 42nd season for the organization overall.

== Standings ==
Central Division
Pos	Team	GP	W	L	OTL	ROW	GF	GA	GD	Pts
1	z – Chicago Blackhawks	82	50	23	9	46	244	213	+31	109
2	x – Minnesota Wild	82	49	25	8	46	266	208	+58	106
3	x – St. Louis Blues	82	46	29	7	44	235	218	+17	99
4	x – Nashville Predators	82	41	29	12	39	240	224	+16	94
5	Winnipeg Jets	82	40	35	7	37	249	256	−7	87
6	Dallas Stars	82	34	37	11	33	223	262	−39	79
7	Colorado Avalanche	82	22	56	4	21	166	278	−112	48

Source: National Hockey League
x – Clinched playoff spot; z – Clinched conference

Western Conference Wild Card
Pos	Div	Team	GP	W	L	OTL	ROW	GF	GA	GD	Pts
1	PA	x – Calgary Flames	82	45	33	4	41	226	221	+5	94
2	CE	x – Nashville Predators	82	41	29	12	39	240	224	+16	94
3	CE	Winnipeg Jets	82	40	35	7	37	249	256	−7	87
4	PA	Los Angeles Kings	82	39	35	8	37	201	205	−4	86
5	CE	Dallas Stars	82	34	37	11	33	223	262	−39	79
6	PA	Arizona Coyotes	82	30	42	10	24	197	260	−63	70
7	PA	Vancouver Canucks	82	30	43	9	26	182	243	−61	69
8	CE	Colorado Avalanche	82	22	56	4	21	166	278	−112	48

Source: National Hockey League
x – Clinched playoff spot

== Schedule and results ==
=== Pre-season ===
2016 Winnipeg Jets Pre-season game log

Rookie Tournament: 0–3–0
#	Date	Visitor	Score	Home	OT	Decision	Attendance	Record	Recap
1^{[a]}	September 16	Winnipeg Rookies	1–4	Calgary Rookies		Berdin	2,706	0–1–0	Recap
2^{[a]}	September 18	Winnipeg Rookies	2–3	Vancouver Rookies		Phillips	4,113	0–2–0	Recap
3^{[a]}	September 19	Winnipeg Rookies	1–4	Edmonton Rookies		Berdin	2,789	0–3–0	Recap
^{[a]}Rookie Tournament at South Okanagan Events Centre in Penticton, British Columbia

September/October: 4–3–0 (Home: 3–1–0; Road: 1–2–0)
#	Date	Visitor	Score	Home	OT	Decision	Attendance	Record	Recap
1	September 27	Calgary	3–0	Winnipeg		Comrie	15,006	0–1–0	Recap
2	September 29	Minnesota	1–4	Winnipeg		Hellebuyck	15,294	1–1–0	Recap
3	September 30	Edmonton	1–5	Winnipeg		Hutchinson	15,294	2–1–0	Recap
4	October 2	Winnipeg	4–0	Calgary		Pavelec	18,158	3–1–0	Recap
5	October 3	Ottawa	2–4	Winnipeg		Hutchinson	15,294	4–1–0	Recap
6	October 6	Winnipeg	2–5	Edmonton		Hellebuyck	18,500	4–2–0	Recap
7	October 8	Winnipeg	1–5	Minnesota		Hutchinson	18,302	4–3–0	Recap

=== Regular season ===
2016–17 Game Log

October: 4–5–0 (Home: 3–3–0; Road: 1–2–0)
#	Date	Visitor	Score	Home	OT	Decision	Attendance	Record	Pts	Recap
1	October 13	Carolina	4–5	Winnipeg	OT	Hellebuyck	15,296	1–0–0	2	Recap
2	October 15	Winnipeg	3–4	Minnesota		Hutchinson	19,024	1–1–0	2	Recap
3	October 17	Boston	4–1	Winnipeg		Hellebuyck	15,296	1–2–0	2	Recap
4	October 19	Toronto	4–5	Winnipeg	OT	Hutchinson	15,294	2–2–0	4	Recap
5	October 23	Edmonton	3–0	Winnipeg		Hellebuyck	33,240 (outdoors)	2–3–0	4	Recap
6	October 25	Winnipeg	2–3	Dallas		Hutchinson	18,040	2–4–0	4	Recap
7	October 27	Dallas	1–4	Winnipeg		Hellebuyck	15,294	3–4–0	6	Recap
8	October 28	Winnipeg	1–0	Colorado		Hutchinson	16,135	4–4–0	8	Recap
9	October 30	Buffalo	3–1	Winnipeg		Hutchinson	15,294	4–5–0	8	Recap

November: 7–7–2 (Home: 5–1–0; Road: 2–6–2)
#	Date	Visitor	Score	Home	OT	Decision	Attendance	Record	Pts	Recap
10	November 1	Washington	3–2	Winnipeg		Hellebuyck	15,294	4–6–0	8	Recap
11	November 3	Winnipeg	3–4	Washington	OT	Hutchinson	18,506	4–6–1	9	Recap
12	November 4	Winnipeg	5–3	Detroit		Hellebuyck	20,027	5–6–1	11	Recap
13	November 6	Winnipeg	2–5	NY Rangers		Hellebuyck	18,006	5–7–1	11	Recap
14	November 8	Dallas	2–8	Winnipeg		Hellebuyck	15,294	6–7–1	13	Recap
15	November 10	Winnipeg	3–2	Arizona		Hellebuyck	11,185	7–7–1	15	Recap
16	November 11	Winnipeg	2–3	Colorado	OT	Hutchinson	16,517	7–7–2	16	Recap
17	November 13	Los Angeles	2–3	Winnipeg	SO	Hellebuyck	15,294	8–7–2	18	Recap
18	November 15	Chicago	0–4	Winnipeg		Hellebuyck	15,294	9–7–2	20	Recap
19	November 17	Winnipeg	2–5	Philadelphia		Hellebuyck	19,432	9–8–2	20	Recap
20	November 19	Winnipeg	1–4	Boston		Hutchinson	17,565	9–9–2	20	Recap
21	November 20	Winnipeg	1–3	Carolina		Hellebuyck	10,809	9–10–2	20	Recap
22	November 23	Winnipeg	1–3	Minnesota		Hellebuyck	19,022	9–11–2	20	Recap
23	November 25	Winnipeg	1–5	Nashville		Hellebuyck	17,192	9–12–2	20	Recap
24	November 27	Nashville	0–3	Winnipeg		Hellebuyck	15,294	10–12–2	22	Recap
25	November 29	New Jersey	2–3	Winnipeg		Hellebuyck	15,294	11–12–2	24	Recap

December: 6–7–1 (Home: 2–4–1; Road: 4–3–0)
#	Date	Visitor	Score	Home	OT	Decision	Attendance	Record	Pts	Recap
26	December 1	Edmonton	6–3	Winnipeg		Hellebuyck	15,294	11–13–2	24	Recap
27	December 3	Winnipeg	3–2	St. Louis	OT	Hutchinson	19,362	12–13–2	26	Recap
28	December 4	Winnipeg	2–1	Chicago		Hellebuyck	21,383	13–13–2	28	Recap
29	December 6	Detroit	4–3	Winnipeg	SO	Hellebuyck	15,294	13–13–3	29	Recap
30	December 8	NY Rangers	2–1	Winnipeg		Hutchinson	15,294	13–14–3	29	Recap
31	December 10	Winnipeg	2–6	Calgary		Hutchinson	18,677	13–15–3	29	Recap
32	December 11	Winnipeg	2–3	Edmonton		Hellebuyck	18,347	13–16–3	29	Recap
33	December 15	Florida	3–4	Winnipeg	SO	Hellebuyck	15,294	14–16–3	31	Recap
34	December 18	Colorado	1–4	Winnipeg		Hellebuyck	15,294	15–16–3	33	Recap
35	December 20	Winnipeg	1–4	Vancouver		Hellebuyck	18,865	15–17–3	33	Recap
36	December 22	Winnipeg	4–1	Vancouver		Hutchinson	18,865	16–17–3	35	Recap
37	December 27	Winnipeg	3–1	Chicago		Hellebuyck	22,117	17–17–3	37	Recap
38	December 29	Columbus	5–3	Winnipeg		Hutchinson	15,294	17–18–3	37	Recap
39	December 31	NY Islanders	6–2	Winnipeg		Hellebuyck	15,294	17–19–3	37	Recap

January: 7–6–1 (Home: 3–3–0; Road: 4–3–1)
#	Date	Visitor	Score	Home	OT	Decision	Attendance	Record	Pts	Recap
40	January 3	Winnipeg	6–4	Tampa Bay		Hellebuyck	19,092	18–19–3	39	Recap
41	January 4	Winnipeg	4–1	Florida		Hellebuyck	13,607	19–19–3	41	Recap
42	January 7	Winnipeg	3–4	Buffalo		Hellebuyck	19,070	19–20–3	41	Recap
43	January 9	Calgary	0–2	Winnipeg		Hellebuyck	15,294	20–20–3	43	Recap
44	January 11	Montreal	7–4	Winnipeg		Hutchinson	15,294	20–21–3	43	Recap
45	January 13	Winnipeg	3–4	Arizona		Hutchinson	12,326	20–22–3	43	Recap
46	January 14	Winnipeg	2–3	Los Angeles	OT	Hutchinson	18,230	20–22–4	44	Recap
47	January 16	Winnipeg	2–5	San Jose		Hutchinson	17,479	20–23–4	44	Recap
48	January 18	Arizona	3–6	Winnipeg		Pavelec	15,294	21–23–4	46	Recap
49	January 21	St. Louis	3–5	Winnipeg		Pavelec	15,294	22–23–4	48	Recap
50	January 23	Anaheim	3–2	Winnipeg		Pavelec	15,294	22–24–4	48	Recap
51	January 24	San Jose	4–3	Winnipeg		Pavelec	15,294	22–25–4	48	Recap
52	January 26	Winnipeg	5–3	Chicago		Hellebuyck	21,746	23–25–4	50	Recap
January 27–29		All-Star Break in Los Angeles
53	January 31	Winnipeg	5–3	St. Louis		Pavelec	19,483	24–25–4	52	Recap

February: 4–5–2 (Home: 1–4–0; Road: 3–1–2)
#	Date	Visitor	Score	Home	OT	Decision	Attendance	Record	Pts	Recap
54	February 2	Winnipeg	4–3	Dallas		Pavelec	17,236	25–25–4	54	Recap
55	February 4	Winnipeg	2–5	Colorado		Pavelec	13,930	25–26–4	54	Recap
56	February 7	Minnesota	4–2	Winnipeg		Pavelec	15,294	25–27–4	54	Recap
57	February 10	Chicago	5–2	Winnipeg		Hellebuyck	15,294	25–28–4	54	Recap
58	February 11	Tampa Bay	4–1	Winnipeg		Hellebuyck	15,294	25–29–4	54	Recap
59	February 14	Dallas	2–5	Winnipeg		Hellebuyck	15,294	26–29–4	56	Recap
60	February 16	Winnipeg	3–4	Pittsburgh	OT	Hellebuyck	18,638	26–29–5	57	Recap
61	February 18	Winnipeg	3–1	Montreal		Hellebuyck	21,288	27–29–5	59	Recap
62	February 19	Winnipeg	3–2	Ottawa		Hellebuyck	19,288	28–29–5	61	Recap
63	February 21	Winnipeg	4–5	Toronto	OT	Hellebuyck	19,583	28–29–6	62	Recap
64	February 28	Minnesota	6–5	Winnipeg		Hutchinson	15,294	28–30–6	62	Recap

March: 8–5–1 (Home: 6–3–0; Road: 2–2–1)
#	Date	Visitor	Score	Home	OT	Decision	Attendance	Record	Pts	Recap
65	March 3	St. Louis	0–3	Winnipeg		Hellebuyck	15,294	29–30–6	64	Recap
66	March 4	Colorado	1–6	Winnipeg		Hellebuyck	15,294	30–30–6	66	Recap
67	March 6	San Jose	3–2	Winnipeg		Hellebuyck	15,294	30–31–6	66	Recap
68	March 8	Pittsburgh	7–4	Winnipeg		Hellebuyck	15,294	30–32–6	66	Recap
69	March 11	Calgary	3–0	Winnipeg		Hellebuyck	15,294	30–33–6	66	Recap
70	March 13	Winnipeg	4–5	Nashville	OT	Hellebuyck	17,355	30–33–7	67	Recap
—	March 14	Winnipeg	—	New Jersey	Postponed due to the effects of the March 2017 nor'easter, rescheduled to March 28
71	March 16	Winnipeg	4–2	NY Islanders		Hellebuyck	13,700	31–33–7	69	Recap
72	March 19	Minnesota	4–5	Winnipeg		Hutchinson	15,294	32–33–7	71	Recap
73	March 21	Philadelphia	2–3	Winnipeg		Hutchinson	15,294	33–33–7	73	Recap
74	March 23	Winnipeg	2–5	Los Angeles		Hellebuyck	18,230	33–34–7	73	Recap
75	March 24	Winnipeg	1–3	Anaheim		Hutchinson	15,647	33–35–7	73	Recap
76	March 26	Vancouver	1–2	Winnipeg		Hutchinson	15,294	34–35–7	75	Recap
77	March 28	Winnipeg	4–3	New Jersey	SO	Hellebuyck	12,315	35–35–7	77	Recap
78	March 30	Anaheim	3–4	Winnipeg	OT	Hutchinson	15,294	36–35–7	79	Recap

April: 4–0–0 (Home: 2–0–0; Road: 2–0–0)
#	Date	Visitor	Score	Home	OT	Decision	Attendance	Record	Pts	Recap
79	April 1	Ottawa	2–4	Winnipeg		Hellebuyck	15,294	37–35–7	81	Recap
80	April 4	Winnipeg	5–2	St. Louis		Hutchinson	19,178	38–35–7	83	Recap
81	April 6	Winnipeg	5–4	Columbus		Comrie	16,447	39–35–7	85	Recap
82	April 8	Nashville	1–2	Winnipeg		Hellebuyck	15,294	40–35–7	87	Recap

Legend: Win (2 points) Loss (0 points) Overtime/shootout loss (1 point)

== Playoffs ==
The Jets did not qualify for the 2017 Stanley Cup playoffs for the second consecutive season.

== Player statistics ==
Final Stats

=== Skaters ===
Regular season
Player	GP	G	A	Pts	+/−	PIM
Mark Scheifele	79	32	50	82	18	38
Blake Wheeler	82	26	48	74	6	47
Patrik Laine	73	36	28	64	7	26
Nikolaj Ehlers	82	25	39	64	1	38
Dustin Byfuglien	80	13	39	52	10	117
Bryan Little	59	21	26	47	−7	18
Mathieu Perreault	65	13	32	45	−11	30
Jacob Trouba	60	8	25	33	4	54
Adam Lowry	82	15	14	29	1	52
Josh Morrissey	82	6	14	20	6	38
Joel Armia	57	10	9	19	−8	20
Andrew Copp	64	9	8	17	8	18
Tobias Enstrom	60	1	13	14	−7	42
Paul Postma	65	1	13	14	3	15
Drew Stafford^{‡}	40	4	9	13	−2	12
Nic Petan	54	1	12	13	−13	12
Shawn Matthias	45	8	4	12	0	13
Ben Chiarot	59	2	10	12	2	33
Marko Dano	38	4	7	11	0	10
Tyler Myers	11	2	3	5	5	13
Kyle Connor	20	2	3	5	−7	4
Chris Thorburn	64	3	1	4	−7	95
Mark Stuart	42	2	2	4	4	27
Brandon Tanev	51	2	2	4	−6	26
Brian Strait	5	0	2	2	−1	0
Julian Melchiori	18	0	2	2	0	8
Alexander Burmistrov^{‡}	23	0	2	2	−6	6
Jack Roslovic	1	0	0	0	−1	0
Nelson Nogier	10	0	0	0	−1	5
Quinton Howden	5	0	0	0	1	0

=== Goaltenders ===
Regular season
Player	GP	GS	TOI	W	L	OT	GA	GAA	SA	SV%	SO	G	A	PIM
Connor Hellebuyck	56	53	3,033:31	26	19	4	146	2.89	1,572	.907	4	0	0	0
Michael Hutchinson	28	20	1,378:20	9	12	3	67	2.92	690	.903	1	0	0	0
Ondrej Pavelec	8	8	439:30	4	4	0	26	3.55	233	.888	0	0	0	0
Eric Comrie	1	1	59:18	1	0	0	4	4.05	39	.897	0	0	0	0

- ^{†} Denotes player spent time with another team before joining the Jets. Stats reflect time with the Jets only.
- ^{‡} Traded mid-season. Stats reflect time with the Jets only.
- Bold/italics denotes franchise record

== Transactions ==
Winnipeg has been involved in the following transactions during the 2016–17 season.

=== Trades ===
Date	Details		Ref
June 24, 2016	To Philadelphia Flyers CHI's 1st-round pick in 2016; 2nd-round pick in 2016	To Winnipeg Jets 1st-round pick in 2016; 3rd-round pick in 2016
June 25, 2016	To Montreal Canadiens 7th-round pick in 2016	To Winnipeg Jets 7th-round pick in 2017
March 1, 2017	To Boston Bruins Drew Stafford	To Winnipeg Jets conditional 6th-round pick in 2018

=== Free agents acquired ===
Date	Player	Former team	Contract terms (in U.S. dollars)	Ref
July 1, 2016	Shawn Matthias	Colorado Avalanche	2 years, $4.25 million	
July 1, 2016	Quinton Howden	Florida Panthers	1 year, $650,000	
July 1, 2016	Brian Strait	New York Islanders	1 year, $600,000	

=== Free agents lost ===
Date	Player	New team	Contract terms (in U.S. dollars)	Ref
July 1, 2016	Andrew MacWilliam	New Jersey Devils	1 year, $575,000	
July 11, 2016	Thomas Raffl	Red Bull Salzburg	Undisclosed	

=== Claimed via waivers ===
Player	Former team	Date claimed off waivers	Ref

=== Lost via waivers ===
Player	New team	Date claimed off waivers	Ref
Alexander Burmistrov	Arizona Coyotes	January 2, 2017	

=== Lost via retirement ===
Date	Player	Ref
June 1, 2016	Grant Clitsome	

=== Player signings ===
Date	Player	Contract terms (in U.S. dollars)	Ref
July 2, 2016	Julian Melchiori	2 years, $1.25 million	
July 2, 2016	Jamie Phillips	2 years, $1.35 million entry-level contract	
July 3, 2016	Patrik Laine	3 years, $10.725 million entry-level contract	
July 7, 2016	Mathieu Perreault	4 years, $16.5 million contract extension	
July 8, 2016	Brenden Kichton	1 year, $600,000	
July 8, 2016	Mark Scheifele	8 years, $49 million contract extension	
July 14, 2016	Joel Armia	2 years, $1.85 million contract extension	
July 14, 2016	Adam Lowry	2 years, $2.25 million contract extension	
July 18, 2016	Jack Roslovic	3 years, $3.4125 million entry-level contract	
July 21, 2016	Brandon Tanev	1 year, $874,125	
August 15, 2016	JC Lipon	1 year, $650,000	
November 7, 2016	Jacob Trouba	2 years, $6 million contract extension	
December 6, 2016	Logan Stanley	3 years, $3.4125 million entry-level contract	
March 30, 2017	Tucker Poolman	1 year, $1.775 million entry-level contract	
April 7, 2017	Jansen Harkins	3 years, $2.775 million entry-level contract	
May 15, 2017	Sami Niku	3 years, $2.75 million entry-level	
June 1, 2017	Michael Spacek	3 years, $2.55 million entry-level	
June 13, 2017	Marko Dano	1 year, $850,000 contract extension	

== Draft picks ==
Below are the Winnipeg Jets' selections at the 2016 NHL entry draft, to be held on June 24–25, 2016 at the First Niagara Center in Buffalo, New York.

Round	#	Player	Pos	Nationality	College/Junior/Club team (League)
1	2	Patrik Laine	RW	Finland	Tappara (Liiga)
1	18^{[a]}	Logan Stanley	D	Canada	Windsor Spitfires (OHL)
3	79^{[b]}	Luke Green	D	Canada	Saint John Sea Dogs (QMJHL)
4	97	Jacob Cederholm	D	Sweden	HV71 (SHL)
5	127	Jordan Stallard	C	Canada	Calgary Hitmen (WHL)
6	157	Mikhail Berdin	G	Russia	Russia U18 (MHL)

Notes

- ^{[a]} The Philadelphia Flyers' first-round pick went to the Winnipeg Jets as the result of a trade on June 24, 2016 that sent Chicago's first-round pick and a second-round pick both in 2016 (22nd and 36th overall) to Philadelphia in exchange for a third-round pick in 2016 (79th overall) and this pick.
- The Winnipeg Jets' second-round pick went to the Philadelphia Flyers as the result of a trade on June 24, 2016 that sent a first and third-round pick both in 2016 (18th and 79th overall) to Winnipeg in exchange for Chicago's first-round pick in 2016 (22nd overall) and this pick.
- The Winnipeg Jets' third round pick went to the Carolina Hurricanes as the result of a trade on February 25, 2015 that sent Jiri Tlusty to Winnipeg in exchange for a conditional sixth-round pick in 2015 and this pick.
- ^{[b]} The Philadelphia Flyers' third-round pick went to the Winnipeg Jets as the result of a trade on June 24, 2016 that sent Chicago's first-round pick and a second-round pick both in 2016 (22nd and 36th overall) to Philadelphia in exchange for a first-round pick in 2016 (18th overall) and this pick.
- The Winnipeg Jets' seventh-round pick went to the Montreal Canadiens as the result of a trade on June 25, 2016 that sent a seventh-round pick in 2017 to Winnipeg in exchange for this pick.
