= 2016–17 Arizona Coyotes season =

NHL hockey team season

2016–17 Arizona Coyotes
- Division: 6th Pacific
- Conference: 12th Western
- 2016–17 record: 30–42–10
- Home record: 18–18–5
- Road record: 12–24–5
- Goals for: 197
- Goals against: 260

Team information
- General manager: John Chayka
- Coach: Dave Tippett
- Captain: Shane Doan
- Alternate captains: Oliver Ekman-Larsson; Martin Hanzal (Oct.–Feb.); Radim Vrbata (Feb.–Apr.)
- Arena: Gila River Arena
- Average attendance: 12,648 (74%)
- Minor league affiliates: Tucson Roadrunners (AHL); Rapid City Rush (ECHL)

Team leaders
- Goals: Radim Vrbata (20)
- Assists: Radim Vrbata (35)
- Points: Radim Vrbata (55)
- Penalty minutes: Luke Schenn (85)
- Plus/minus: Christian Dvorak (+7)
- Wins: Mike Smith (19)
- Goals against average: Mike Smith (2.92)

The 2016–17 Arizona Coyotes season was the 38th season for the National Hockey League (NHL) franchise that was established on June 22, 1979, the 21st season since the franchise relocated from Winnipeg following the 1995–96 NHL season, and the 45th overall, including the World Hockey Association years.

This season marked the end of the Shane Doan era, as he retired from the NHL after playing 21 seasons for the Winnipeg Jets-Phoenix/Arizona Coyotes franchise. Doan was the last remaining active player from the original Winnipeg Jets team, following Teemu Selänne's retirement in 2014.

== Standings ==
Pacific Division
Pos	Team	GP	W	L	OTL	ROW	GF	GA	GD	Pts
1	y – Anaheim Ducks	82	46	23	13	43	223	200	+23	105
2	x – Edmonton Oilers	82	47	26	9	43	247	212	+35	103
3	x – San Jose Sharks	82	46	29	7	44	221	201	+20	99
4	x – Calgary Flames	82	45	33	4	41	226	221	+5	94
5	Los Angeles Kings	82	39	35	8	37	201	205	−4	86
6	Arizona Coyotes	82	30	42	10	24	197	260	−63	70
7	Vancouver Canucks	82	30	43	9	26	182	243	−61	69

Source: National Hockey League
x – Clinched playoff spot; y – Clinched division

Western Conference Wild Card
Pos	Div	Team	GP	W	L	OTL	ROW	GF	GA	GD	Pts
1	PA	x – Calgary Flames	82	45	33	4	41	226	221	+5	94
2	CE	x – Nashville Predators	82	41	29	12	39	240	224	+16	94
3	CE	Winnipeg Jets	82	40	35	7	37	249	256	−7	87
4	PA	Los Angeles Kings	82	39	35	8	37	201	205	−4	86
5	CE	Dallas Stars	82	34	37	11	33	223	262	−39	79
6	PA	Arizona Coyotes	82	30	42	10	24	197	260	−63	70
7	PA	Vancouver Canucks	82	30	43	9	26	182	243	−61	69
8	CE	Colorado Avalanche	82	22	56	4	21	166	278	−112	48

Source: National Hockey League
x – Clinched playoff spot

== Schedule and results ==
=== Pre-season ===
2016 pre-season game log: 5–1–2 (Home: 3–0–0; Road: 2–1–2)
#	Date	Visitor	Score	Home	OT	Decision	Attendance	Record	Recap
1^{[A]}	September 26	Los Angeles	3–5	Arizona		Smith	5,256	1–0–0	Recap
2^{[A]}	September 26	Arizona	3–4	Los Angeles		Langhamer	11,064	1–1–0	Recap
3	September 27	Arizona	2–1	Anaheim		Peters	14,609	2–1–0	Recap
4	September 30	Arizona	2–3	San Jose	OT	Domingue	15,985	2–1–1	Recap
5	October 1	Anaheim	2–3	Arizona	OT	Smith	7,181	3–1–1	Recap
6	October 3	Arizona	4–2	Vancouver		Domingue	16,869	4–1–1	Recap
7	October 5	Arizona	1–2	Calgary	SO	Smith	17,878	4–1–2	Recap
8	October 7	San Jose	1–3	Arizona		Smith	7,235	5–1–2	Recap
^{A} – indicates split-squad game.

=== Regular season ===
2016–17 game log

October: 2–6–0 (Home: 1–1–0; Road: 1–5–0)
#	Date	Visitor	Score	Home	OT	Decision	Attendance	Record	Pts	Recap
1	October 15	Philadelphia	3–4	Arizona	OT	Smith	17,125	1–0–0	2	Recap
2	October 18	Arizona	4–7	Ottawa		Domingue	11,061	1–1–0	2	Recap
3	October 20	Arizona	2–5	Montreal		Domingue	21,288	1–2–0	2	Recap
4	October 21	Arizona	2–3	NY Islanders		Domingue	13,076	1–3–0	2	Recap
5	October 23	Arizona	2–3	NY Rangers		Domingue	18,006	1–4–0	2	Recap
6	October 25	Arizona	3–5	New Jersey		Peters	12,756	1–5–0	2	Recap
7	October 27	Arizona	5–4	Philadelphia		Domingue	19,432	2–5–0	4	Recap
8	October 29	Colorado	3–2	Arizona		Domingue	13,533	2–6–0	4	Recap

November: 6–4–3 (Home: 4–3–0; Road: 2–1–3)
#	Date	Visitor	Score	Home	OT	Decision	Attendance	Record	Pts	Recap
9	November 1	San Jose	2–3	Arizona		Domingue	11,046	3–6–0	6	Recap
10	November 3	Nashville	2–3	Arizona	SO	Domingue	10,745	4–6–0	8	Recap
11	November 4	Arizona	1–5	Anaheim		Domingue	16,405	4–7–0	8	Recap
12	November 8	Arizona	4–2	Colorado		Domingue	13,858	5–7–0	10	Recap
13	November 10	Winnipeg	3–2	Arizona		Domingue	11,185	5–8–0	10	Recap
14	November 12	Boston	2–1	Arizona		Domingue	16,531	5–9–0	10	Recap
15	November 16	Arizona	1–2	Calgary	OT	Smith	18,202	5–9–1	11	Recap
16	November 17	Arizona	2–3	Vancouver	OT	Domingue	18,027	5–9–2	12	Recap
17	November 19	San Jose	2–3	Arizona	OT	Smith	13,148	6–9–2	14	Recap
18	November 23	Vancouver	4–1	Arizona		Smith	11,256	6–10–2	14	Recap
19	November 25	Edmonton	2–3	Arizona	SO	Smith	14,950	7–10–2	16	Recap
20	November 27	Arizona	2–1	Edmonton		Smith	18,347	8–10–2	18	Recap
21	November 29	Arizona	1–2	San Jose	OT	Smith	17,377	8–10–3	19	Recap

December: 3–11–2 (Home: 1–6–2; Road: 2–5–0)
#	Date	Visitor	Score	Home	OT	Decision	Attendance	Record	Pts	Recap
22	December 1	Los Angeles	4–3	Arizona		Smith	11,327	8–11–3	19	Recap
23	December 3	Columbus	3–2	Arizona	SO	Smith	11,287	8–11–4	20	Recap
24	December 5	Arizona	1–4	Columbus		Domingue	11,091	8–12–4	20	Recap
25	December 6	Arizona	0–4	Chicago		Smith	21,327	8–13–4	20	Recap
26	December 8	Calgary	2–1	Arizona	OT	Smith	10,210	8–13–5	21	Recap
27	December 10	Nashville	1–4	Arizona		Smith	13,820	9–13–5	23	Recap
28	December 12	Arizona	0–7	Pittsburgh		Smith	18,420	9–14–5	23	Recap
29	December 13	Arizona	4–1	Detroit		Smith	20,027	10–14–5	25	Recap
30	December 15	Arizona	3–2	Toronto	SO	Smith	18,903	11–14–5	27	Recap
31	December 17	Arizona	1–4	Minnesota		Smith	19,036	11–15–5	27	Recap
32	December 19	Calgary	4–2	Arizona		Smith	12,192	11–16–5	27	Recap
33	December 21	Edmonton	3–2	Arizona		Smith	11,378	11–17–5	27	Recap
34	December 23	Toronto	4–1	Arizona		Smith	14,377	11–18–5	27	Recap
35	December 27	Dallas	3–2	Arizona		Smith	14,561	11–19–5	27	Recap
36	December 29	NY Rangers	6–3	Arizona		Smith	15,090	11–20–5	27	Recap
37	December 31	Arizona	2–4	Calgary		Domingue	19,289	11–21–5	27	Recap

January: 5–6–1 (Home: 5–2–0; Road: 0–4–1)
#	Date	Visitor	Score	Home	OT	Decision	Attendance	Record	Pts	Recap
38	January 4	Arizona	0–3	Vancouver		Smith	18,215	11–22–5	27	Recap
39	January 6	Arizona	2–3	Anaheim	OT	Smith	15,415	11–22–6	28	Recap
40	January 7	NY Islanders	1–2	Arizona	SO	Domingue	12,380	12–22–6	30	Recap
41	January 13	Winnipeg	3–4	Arizona		Smith	12,326	13–22–6	32	Recap
42	January 14	Anaheim	3–0	Arizona		Domingue	12,015	13–23–6	32	Recap
43	January 16	Arizona	1–3	Edmonton		Smith	18,347	13–24–6	32	Recap
44	January 18	Arizona	3–6	Winnipeg		Smith	15,294	13–25–6	32	Recap
45	January 19	Arizona	3–4	Minnesota		Domingue	19,027	13–26–6	32	Recap
46	January 21	Tampa Bay	3–5	Arizona		Smith	12,177	14–26–6	34	Recap
47	January 23	Florida	2–3	Arizona	OT	Smith	10,042	15–26–6	36	Recap
48	January 26	Vancouver	0–3	Arizona		Smith	11,203	16–26–6	38	Recap
January 27–29		All-Star Break in Los Angeles
49	January 31	Los Angeles	3–2	Arizona		Smith	11,577	16–27–6	38	Recap

February: 6–6–1 (Home: 3–2–1; Road: 3–4–0)
#	Date	Visitor	Score	Home	OT	Decision	Attendance	Record	Pts	Recap
50	February 2	Chicago	4–3	Arizona		Smith	17,125	16–28–6	38	Recap
51	February 4	Arizona	3–2	San Jose	SO	Smith	17,562	17–28–6	40	Recap
52	February 9	Montreal	5–4	Arizona	OT	Smith	14,098	17–28–7	41	Recap
53	February 11	Pittsburgh	3–4	Arizona	OT	Smith	15,879	18–28–7	43	Recap
54	February 13	Arizona	5–0	Calgary		Smith	18,486	19–28–7	45	Recap
55	February 14	Arizona	2–5	Edmonton		Domingue	18,347	19–29–7	45	Recap
56	February 16	Arizona	5–3	Los Angeles		Smith	18,230	20–29–7	47	Recap
57	February 18	San Jose	4–1	Arizona		Smith	17,446	20–30–7	47	Recap
58	February 20	Anaheim	2–3	Arizona		Langhamer	14,554	21–30–7	49	Recap
59	February 23	Arizona	3–6	Chicago		Smith	21,781	21–31–7	49	Recap
60	February 24	Arizona	2–5	Dallas		Domingue	18,043	21–32–7	49	Recap
61	February 26	Buffalo	2–3	Arizona		Domingue	13,432	22–32–7	51	Recap
62	February 28	Arizona	1–4	Boston		Smith	17,565	22–33–7	51	Recap

March: 6–8–2 (Home: 3–3–2; Road: 3–5–0)
#	Date	Visitor	Score	Home	OT	Decision	Attendance	Record	Pts	Recap
63	March 2	Arizona	3–6	Buffalo		Smith	18,116	22–34–7	51	Recap
64	March 3	Arizona	4–2	Carolina		Domingue	10,827	23–34–7	53	Recap
65	March 5	Carolina	2–1	Arizona		Smith	10,224	23–35–7	53	Recap
66	March 9	Ottawa	3–2	Arizona	OT	Smith	10,611	23–35–8	54	Recap
67	March 11	New Jersey	4–5	Arizona		Smith	11,223	24–35–8	56	Recap
68	March 13	Colorado	0–1	Arizona		Smith	11,521	25–35–8	58	Recap
69	March 14	Arizona	3–2	Los Angeles	SO	Domingue	18,230	26–35–8	60	Recap
70	March 16	Detroit	5–4	Arizona	SO	Smith	15,036	26–35–9	61	Recap
71	March 18	St. Louis	3–0	Arizona		Smith	15,132	26–36–9	61	Recap
72	March 20	Arizona	1–3	Nashville		Smith	17,113	26–37–9	61	Recap
73	March 21	Arizona	5–3	Tampa Bay		Domingue	19,092	27–37–9	63	Recap
74	March 23	Arizona	1–3	Florida		Smith	11,338	27–38–9	63	Recap
75	March 25	Arizona	1–4	Washington		Smith	18,506	27–39–9	63	Recap
76	March 27	Arizona	1–4	St. Louis		Smith	19,164	27–40–9	63	Recap
77	March 29	St. Louis	3–1	Arizona		Domingue	11,377	27–41–9	63	Recap
78	March 31	Washington	3–6	Arizona		Domingue	14,290	28–41–9	65	Recap

April: 2–1–1 (Home: 1–1–0; Road: 1–0–1)
#	Date	Visitor	Score	Home	OT	Decision	Attendance	Record	Pts	Recap
79	April 2	Arizona	2–1	Los Angeles		Smith	18,230	29–41–9	67	Recap
80	April 4	Arizona	2–3	Dallas	OT	Smith	16,876	29–41–10	68	Recap
81	April 6	Vancouver	3–4	Arizona		Domingue	11,959	30–41–10	70	Recap
82	April 8	Minnesota	3–1	Arizona		Smith	17,490	30–42–10	70	Recap

Legend: Win (2 points) Loss (0 points) Overtime/shootout loss (1 point)

== Playoffs ==
The Coyotes missed the playoffs for the fifth consecutive year.

== Player statistics ==
Final stats

Regular season
Player	GP	G	A	Pts	+/−	PIM
Radim Vrbata	81	20	35	55	−18	16
Oliver Ekman-Larsson	79	12	27	39	−25	48
Max Domi	59	9	29	38	−9	40
Alex Goligoski	82	6	30	36	−9	28
Tobias Rieder	80	16	18	34	−8	6
Christian Dvorak	78	15	18	33	7	22
Shane Doan	74	6	21	27	−3	48
Martin Hanzal^{‡}	51	16	10	26	−15	43
Jordan Martinook	77	11	14	25	−8	40
Brendan Perlini	57	14	7	21	−4	20
Jakob Chychrun	68	7	13	20	−14	47
Jamie McGinn	72	9	8	17	−23	23
Connor Murphy	77	2	15	17	−13	45
Anthony Duclair	58	5	10	15	−7	14
Tony DeAngelo	39	5	9	14	−13	37
Alexander Burmistrov^{†}	26	5	9	14	−1	6
Ryan White^{‡}	46	7	6	13	−8	70
Lawson Crouse	72	5	7	12	−20	48
Peter Holland^{†}	40	5	6	11	−14	18
Josh Jooris^{†}	42	3	7	10	−3	10
Brad Richardson	16	5	4	9	−1	15
Michael Stone^{‡}	45	1	8	9	−5	12
Luke Schenn	78	1	7	8	−9	85
Christian Fischer	7	3	0	3	0	0
Laurent Dauphin	24	2	1	3	−2	12
Clayton Keller	3	0	2	2	−3	0
Teemu Pulkkinen^{†}	4	1	0	1	−1	4
Kevin Connauton	24	0	1	1	−1	24
Tyler Gaudet	4	0	1	1	0	0
Dylan Strome	7	0	1	1	−5	0
Jamie McBain	3	0	0	0	−1	0
Zbyněk Michálek	3	0	0	0	1	0

Goaltenders

Regular season
Player	GP	GS	TOI	W	L	OT	GA	GAA	SA	SV%	SO	G	A	PIM
Mike Smith	55	55	3202:08	19	26	9	156	2.92	1819	.914	3	0	0	14
Louis Domingue	31	26	1598:41	11	15	1	82	3.08	888	.908	0	0	0	0
Justin Peters^{‡}	3	1	132:55	0	1	0	7	3.16	70	.900	0	0	0	0
Marek Langhamer	1	0	15:31	0	0	0	1	3.75	8	.875	0	0	0	0

^{†}Denotes player spent time with another team before joining the Coyotes. Stats reflect time with the Coyotes only.
^{‡}Traded mid-season
Bold/italics denotes franchise record

== Transactions ==
The Coyotes have been involved in the following transactions during the 2016–17 season.

=== Trades ===
Date	Details		Ref
June 24, 2016	To Detroit Red Wings Joe Vitale; NYR's 1st-round pick in 2016 compensatory 2nd-round pick in 2016	To Arizona Coyotes contract of Pavel Datsyuk; 1st-round pick in 2016
June 25, 2016	To Tampa Bay Lightning 2nd-round pick in 2016	To Arizona Coyotes Tony DeAngelo
August 25, 2016	To Florida Panthers 3rd-round pick in 2017; Conditional 2nd-round pick in 2018	To Arizona Coyotes Lawson Crouse; Dave Bolland
December 9, 2016	To Toronto Maple Leafs Conditional 6th-round pick in 2018	To Arizona Coyotes Peter Holland
February 1, 2017	To Dallas Stars Justin Peters; Justin Hache	To Arizona Coyotes Brendan Ranford; Branden Troock
February 1, 2017	To Edmonton Oilers Henrik Samuelsson	To Arizona Coyotes Mitch Moroz
February 20, 2017	To Calgary Flames Michael Stone	To Arizona Coyotes 3rd-round pick in 2017; Conditional 5th-round pick in 2018
February 25, 2017	To Tampa Bay Lightning Stefan Fournier	To Arizona Coyotes Jeremy Morin
February 1, 2017	To Edmonton Oilers Henrik Samuelsson	To Arizona Coyotes Mitch Moroz
February 26, 2017	To Minnesota Wild Martin Hanzal; Ryan White; 4th-round pick in 2017	To Arizona Coyotes 1st-round pick in 2017; 2nd-round pick in 2018 conditional 4th-round pick in 2019; Grayson Downing
February 27, 2017	To Minnesota Wild Future considerations	To Arizona Coyotes Teemu Pulkkinen

=== Free agents acquired ===
Date	Player	Former team	Contract terms (in U.S. dollars)	Ref
July 1, 2016	Jamie McGinn	Anaheim Ducks	3 years, $10 million	
July 1, 2016	Justin Peters	Hershey Bears	1 year, $600,000	
July 1, 2016	Jamie McBain	Los Angeles Kings	1 year, $650,000	
July 1, 2016	Garret Ross	Rockford IceHogs	1 year, $600,000	
July 1, 2016	Chris Mueller	San Diego Gulls	1 year, $600,000	
July 1, 2016	Ryan White	Philadelphia Flyers	1 year, $1 million	
July 23, 2016	Luke Schenn	Los Angeles Kings	2 years, $2.5 million	
August 16, 2016	Radim Vrbata	Vancouver Canucks	1 year, $1 million	
October 13, 2016	Lane Pederson	Swift Current Broncos	3 years, $1.98 million entry-level contract	
October 6, 2016	Jalen Smereck	Flint Firebirds	3 years, $1.965 million entry-level contract	
May 16, 2017	Hunter Miska	Univ. of Minnesota-Duluth	2 years, $3.55 million entry-level	
April 15, 2017	Mario Kempe	Vityaz Podolsk	1 year, $650,000	

=== Free agents lost ===
Date	Player	New team	Contract terms (in U.S. dollars)	Ref
June 6, 2016	Jiří Sekáč	Ak Bars Kazan	1 year, Undisclosed	
July 1, 2016	Boyd Gordon	Philadelphia Flyers	1 year, $950,000	
July 1, 2016	Sergei Plotnikov	SKA St. Petersburg	2 years, Undisclosed	
July 5, 2016	Alex Grant	Boston Bruins	1 year, $600,000	
July 17, 2016	Viktor Tikhonov	SKA St. Petersburg	1 year, Undisclosed	
July 18, 2016	Kyle Chipchura	HC Slovan Bratislava	1 year, Undisclosed	
August 5, 2016	Eric Selleck	Tucson Roadrunners	1 year, Undisclosed	
August 15, 2016	Antoine Vermette	Anaheim Ducks	2 years, $3.5 million	
August 30, 2016	Alex Grant	Boston Bruins	1 year, $600,000	

=== Claimed via waivers ===
Player	Former team	Date claimed off waivers	Ref
Josh Jooris	New York Rangers	December 11, 2016	
Alexander Burmistrov	Winnipeg Jets	January 2, 2017	

=== Lost via waivers ===
Player	New team	Date claimed off waivers	Ref
Klas Dahlbeck	Carolina Hurricanes	October 11, 2016	

=== Lost via retirement ===
Date	Player	Ref
May 28, 2017	Craig Cunningham	

=== Player signings ===
The following players were signed by the Coyotes. Two-way contracts are marked with an asterisk (*).

Date	Player	Contract terms (in U.S. dollars)	Ref
June 27, 2016	Louis Domingue	2 years, $2.1 million	
July 1, 2016	Kevin Connauton	2 years, $2 million	
July 1, 2016	Jarred Tinordi	1 year, $700,000	
July 1, 2016	Klas Dahlbeck	1 year, $750,000	
July 12, 2016	Shane Doan	1 year, $5 million	
July 15, 2016	Tyler Gaudet	1 year, $874,125	
July 22, 2016	Stefan Fournier	1 year, $632,500	
July 28, 2016	Connor Murphy	6 years, $23.1 million	
July 28, 2016	Michael Stone	1 year, $4 million	
July 30, 2016	Jakob Chychrun	3 years, $4.05 million entry-level contract	
October 4, 2016	Tobias Rieder	2 years, $4.45 million	
October 31, 2016	Kyle Capobianco	3 years, $2.775 million entry-level contract	
March 26, 2017	Clayton Keller	3 years, $5.0125 million entry-level contract	
April 12, 2016	Jens Looke	3 years, $2.775 million entry-level	
May 1, 2016	Cam Dineen	3 years, $2.775 million entry-level	

== Draft picks ==
Below are the Arizona Coyotes' selections at the 2016 NHL entry draft, to be held on June 24–25, 2016, at the First Niagara Center in Buffalo.

Round	#	Player	Pos	Nationality	College/Junior/Club team (League)
1	7	Clayton Keller	C	United States	U.S. NTDP (USHL)
1	16^{[a]}	Jakob Chychrun	D	Canada	Sarnia Sting (OHL)
3	68	Cam Dineen	D	United States	North Bay Battalion (OHL)
6	158	Patrick Kudla	D	Canada	Oakville Blades (OJHL)
7	188	Dean Stewart	D	Canada	Portage Terriers (MJHL)

Draft notes

- ^{[a]} The Detroit Red Wings' first-round pick went to the Arizona Coyotes as the result of a trade on June 24, 2016, that sent Joe Vitale, the Rangers' first-round pick and a compensatory second-round pick both in 2016 (20th and 53rd overall) to Detroit in exchange for Pavel Datsyuk and this pick.
- The Arizona Coyotes' second-round pick went to the Tampa Bay Lightning as the result of a trade on June 25, 2016, that sent Tony DeAngelo to Arizona in exchange for this pick.
- The Arizona Coyotes' compensatory second-round pick (53rd overall) went to the Detroit Red Wings as the result of a trade on June 24, 2016, that sent Pavel Datsyuk and a first-round pick in 2016 (16th overall) to Arizona in exchange for Joe Vitale, the Rangers' first-round pick in 2016 (20th overall) and this pick.

Arizona previously received this pick as compensation for not signing 2014 first-round draft pick Conner Bleackley, whom they acquired in an earlier trade with Colorado.

- The Arizona Coyotes' fourth-round pick went to the New York Rangers as the result of a trade on March 1, 2015, that sent John Moore, Anthony Duclair, Tampa Bay's second-round pick in 2015 and a conditional first-round pick in 2016 to Arizona in exchange for Keith Yandle, Chris Summers and this pick.
- The Arizona Coyotes' fifth-round pick went to the Dallas Stars as the result of a trade on June 16, 2016, that sent Alex Goligoski to Arizona in exchange for this pick.
