= 2016–17 Los Angeles Kings season =

National Hockey League team season

2016–17 Los Angeles Kings
- Division: 5th Pacific
- Conference: 10th Western
- 2016–17 record: 39–35–8
- Home record: 23–16–2
- Road record: 16–19–6
- Goals for: 201
- Goals against: 205

Team information
- General manager: Dean Lombardi
- Coach: Darryl Sutter
- Captain: Anze Kopitar
- Alternate captains: Jeff Carter; Drew Doughty
- Arena: Staples Center
- Minor league affiliates: Ontario Reign (AHL); Manchester Monarchs (ECHL)

Team leaders
- Goals: Jeff Carter (32)
- Assists: Anze Kopitar (40)
- Points: Jeff Carter (66)
- Penalty minutes: Kyle Clifford (92)
- Plus/minus: Drew Doughty; Derek Forbort (+8)
- Wins: Jonathan Quick (8)
- Goals against average: Jonathan Quick (2.26)

The 2016–17 Los Angeles Kings season was the 50th season (49th season of play) for the National Hockey League (NHL) franchise that was established on June 5, 1967. The Kings did not qualify for the 2017 Stanley Cup playoffs, finishing with 86 points.

In March 2017, former Calgary Flames star Jarome Iginla signed with the Kings to play the remainder of the season there. Iginla retired after the season. Later that same month, longtime broadcaster Bob Miller announced he would retire after the season. This season would also be the last for head coach Darryl Sutter and general manager Dean Lombardi, who would both be fired after the Kings' final regular season game.

== Regular season overview ==
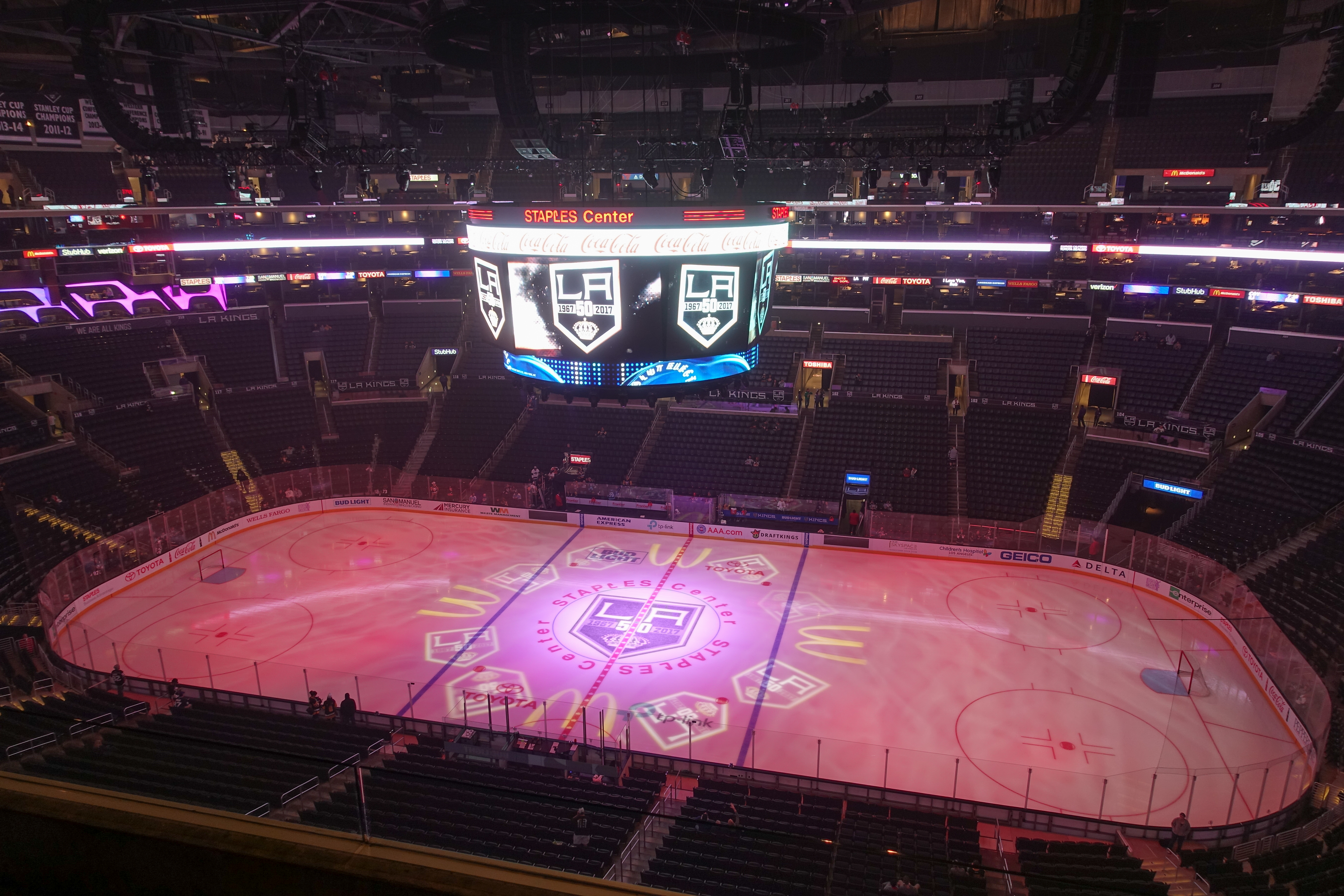
Staples Center in 2016, during the Kings' 50th Anniversary season.

This season marked the 50th anniversary of the Los Angeles Kings, who were looking for another chance at making the playoffs following the team's early exit in the 2016 Stanley Cup playoffs to the San Jose Sharks. The Kings would host the 62nd National Hockey League All-Star Game on January 29, 2017, following the announcement back in January 2016 that the city of Los Angeles would host. During the off-season, forward Anze Kopitar replaced Dustin Brown as team captain, due to Brown's recent goal production drop.

The season would see several ups and downs for the team, ranging from injuries to key players, to younger players from the affiliate team Ontario Reign getting more call-ups to the Kings, and some familiar faces from the Kings' two championship runs departing. On October 12, 2016, the Kings' starting netminder Jonathan Quick would injure his groin in the team's first game of the season; he would not return until February 25, 2017. Former NHL veteran Peter Budaj would be recalled from the Reign and serve as the starting goaltender in Quick's absence. Budaj would later be traded after Quick's return in exchange for Ben Bishop.

Jeff Carter would lead the team in goal-scoring through the season, surpassing team captain Anze Kopitar, who struggled. He would be voted into the All-Star Game for his performance, along with defenseman Drew Doughty. They are the only players from the Los Angeles Kings representing the team this year. Injuries to forwards Tyler Toffoli and Marian Gaborik (who was injured before the regular season) greatly impacted the scoring. However, it propelled forwards such as Tanner Pearson and Trevor Lewis, to score at a more higher rate than before. Gaborik would return to the ice on November 26, 2016. Toffoli, who was injured on December 20, 2016, would not return until February 4 after missing more than a month of action. On March 1, 2017, the Kings acquired Jarome Iginla in a trade with the Colorado Avalanche, who would put up 6 goals in his only season with the team. This season also marked the debut of 20-year old Adrian Kempe.

The Kings' defense struggled in games and the team relied on the emergence of young defensemen Derek Forbort, Kevin Gravel and Paul LaDue to aid veterans Drew Doughty, Alec Martinez, Jake Muzzin, Matt Greene and Brayden McNabb. However, Forbort proved to be the more formidable of the three, and would play all 82 regular season games. Greene would unexpectedly play in his final season with the Kings and the NHL, after he got injured on January 20, 2017, be placed on long-term injured reserve, and would be bought out after the season.

Ultimately the Kings were chasing for a playoff spot all season and, despite the team's best efforts, missed the playoffs for the second time in three years.

=== Alternate uniform ===
On September 20, 2016, the Los Angeles Kings revealed a new alternate uniform for the season. Taking cues from their overall history, the jersey is silver with black stripes on the shoulders and sleeves, and a black tail stripe on the bottom; the thin silver stripes on the sleeves represents the team's two Stanley Cup Championships. The inner neckline of the jersey is purple, featuring five gold diamonds honoring the team's 50th anniversary. The Kings' jersey set contains two patches on the shoulders, one for the 50th Anniversary worn on the right shoulder and an All-Star patch worn on the left shoulder. Following the All-Star Break, the left shoulder patch would disappear. A patch honoring Bob Miller's 44 years of broadcasting Los Angeles Kings home games took over the left shoulder during the team's final two games.

== Standings ==
Pacific Division
Pos	Team	GP	W	L	OTL	ROW	GF	GA	GD	Pts
1	y – Anaheim Ducks	82	46	23	13	43	223	200	+23	105
2	x – Edmonton Oilers	82	47	26	9	43	247	212	+35	103
3	x – San Jose Sharks	82	46	29	7	44	221	201	+20	99
4	x – Calgary Flames	82	45	33	4	41	226	221	+5	94
5	Los Angeles Kings	82	39	35	8	37	201	205	−4	86
6	Arizona Coyotes	82	30	42	10	24	197	260	−63	70
7	Vancouver Canucks	82	30	43	9	26	182	243	−61	69

Source: National Hockey League
x – Clinched playoff spot; y – Clinched division

Western Conference Wild Card
Pos	Div	Team	GP	W	L	OTL	ROW	GF	GA	GD	Pts
1	PA	x – Calgary Flames	82	45	33	4	41	226	221	+5	94
2	CE	x – Nashville Predators	82	41	29	12	39	240	224	+16	94
3	CE	Winnipeg Jets	82	40	35	7	37	249	256	−7	87
4	PA	Los Angeles Kings	82	39	35	8	37	201	205	−4	86
5	CE	Dallas Stars	82	34	37	11	33	223	262	−39	79
6	PA	Arizona Coyotes	82	30	42	10	24	197	260	−63	70
7	PA	Vancouver Canucks	82	30	43	9	26	182	243	−61	69
8	CE	Colorado Avalanche	82	22	56	4	21	166	278	−112	48

Source: National Hockey League
x – Clinched playoff spot

== Schedule and results ==
=== Pre-season ===
2016 pre-season game log: 3–4–1 (Home: 2–1–1; Road: 1–3–0)
#	Date	Visitor	Score	Home	OT	Decision	Attendance	Record	Recap
1^{[A]}	September 26	Los Angeles	3–5	Arizona		Budaj	5,256	0–1–0	Recap
2^{[A]}	September 26	Arizona	3–4	Los Angeles		Campbell	11,064	1–1–0	Recap
3	September 28	Anaheim	1–6	Los Angeles		Budaj	14,810	2–1–0	Recap
4	September 30	Los Angeles	1–3	Colorado		Zatkoff	—	2–2–0	Recap
5	October 2	Los Angeles	1–0	Anaheim		Quick	15,837	3–2–0	Recap
6	October 2	Los Angeles	2–3	Edmonton		Quick	—	3–3–0	Recap
7	October 7	Dallas	6–3	Los Angeles		—	—	3–4–0	Recap
8	October 8	Colorado	2–1	Los Angeles	OT	—	—	3–4–1	Recap
^{A} – indicates split-squad game.

=== Regular season ===
2016–17 Game Log

October: 4–5–0 (Home: 3–1–0; Road: 1–4–0)
#	Date	Visitor	Score	Home	OT	Decision	Attendance	Record	Pts	Recap
1	October 12	Los Angeles	1–2	San Jose		Zatkoff	17,562	0–1–0	0	Recap
2	October 14	Philadelphia	4–2	Los Angeles		Zatkoff	18,453	0–2–0	0	Recap
3	October 18	Los Angeles	3–6	Minnesota		Zatkoff	18,644	0–3–0	0	Recap
4	October 20	Los Angeles	4–3	Dallas	OT	Budaj	18,532	1–3–0	2	Recap
5	October 22	Vancouver	3–4	Los Angeles	SO	Budaj	18,230	2–3–0	4	Recap
6	October 25	Columbus	2–3	Los Angeles	OT	Budaj	18,230	3–3–0	6	Recap
7	October 27	Nashville	2–3	Los Angeles	OT	Budaj	18,230	4–3–0	8	Recap
8	October 29	Los Angeles	0–1	St. Louis		Budaj	18,631	4–4–0	8	Recap
9	October 30	Los Angeles	0–3	Chicago		Budaj	21,329	4–5–0	8	Recap

November: 8–5–1 (Home: 6–2–0; Road: 2–3–1)
#	Date	Visitor	Score	Home	OT	Decision	Attendance	Record	Pts	Recap
10	November 1	Anaheim	4–0	Los Angeles		Budaj	18,230	4–6–0	8	Recap
11	November 3	Pittsburgh	2–3	Los Angeles	OT	Budaj	18,230	5–6–0	10	Recap
12	November 5	Calgary	0–5	Los Angeles		Budaj	18,230	6–6–0	12	Recap
13	November 8	Los Angeles	7–0	Toronto		Budaj	18,976	7–6–0	14	Recap
14	November 10	Los Angeles	1–4	Montreal		Budaj	21,288	7–7–0	14	Recap
15	November 11	Los Angeles	1–2	Ottawa		Budaj	15,622	7–8–0	14	Recap
16	November 13	Los Angeles	2–3	Winnipeg	SO	Budaj	15,294	7–8–1	15	Recap
17	November 15	Los Angeles	1–4	Colorado		Budaj	14,805	7–9–1	15	Recap
18	November 17	Edmonton	2–4	Los Angeles		Budaj	18,230	8–9–1	17	Recap
19	November 19	New Jersey	2–4	Los Angeles		Budaj	18,230	9–9–1	19	Recap
20	November 20	Los Angeles	3–2	Anaheim		Budaj	16,611	10–9–1	21	Recap
21	November 23	NY Islanders	2–4	Los Angeles		Budaj	18,230	11–9–1	23	Recap
22	November 26	Chicago	1–2	Los Angeles	OT	Budaj	18,435	12–9–1	25	Recap
23	November 30	San Jose	4–1	Los Angeles		Budaj	18,230	12–10–1	25	Recap

December: 6–5–3 (Home: 2–1–1; Road: 4–4–2)
#	Date	Visitor	Score	Home	OT	Decision	Attendance	Record	Pts	Recap
24	December 1	Los Angeles	4–3	Arizona		Zatkoff	11,327	13–10–1	27	Recap
25	December 4	Montreal	5–4	Los Angeles	SO	Budaj	18,230	13–10–2	28	Recap
26	December 8	Carolina	3–1	Los Angeles		Zatkoff	18,230	13–11–2	28	Recap
27	December 10	Ottawa	1–4	Los Angeles		Budaj	18,230	14–11–2	30	Recap
28	December 13	Los Angeles	3–6	Buffalo		Budaj	18,375	14–12–2	30	Recap
29	December 15	Los Angeles	4–1	Detroit		Zatkoff	20,027	15–12–2	32	Recap
30	December 16	Los Angeles	1–0	Pittsburgh	OT	Budaj	18,544	16–12–2	34	Recap
31	December 18	Los Angeles	0–1	Boston		Budaj	17,565	16–13–2	34	Recap
32	December 20	Los Angeles	2–3	Columbus	SO	Budaj	16,568	16–13–3	35	Recap
33	December 22	Los Angeles	4–0	Nashville		Budaj	17,156	17–13–3	37	Recap
34	December 23	Los Angeles	2–3	Dallas	OT	Zatkoff	18,156	17–13–4	38	Recap
35	December 28	Los Angeles	1–2	Vancouver		Budaj	18,865	17–14–4	38	Recap
36	December 29	Los Angeles	1–3	Edmonton		Budaj	18,347	17–15–4	38	Recap
37	December 31	San Jose	2–3	Los Angeles		Budaj	18,230	18–15–4	40	Recap

January: 7–6–0 (Home: 3–4–0; Road: 4–2–0)
#	Date	Visitor	Score	Home	OT	Decision	Attendance	Record	Pts	Recap
38	January 3	Los Angeles	2–1	San Jose	OT	Budaj	17,562	19–15–4	42	Recap
39	January 5	Detroit	4–0	Los Angeles		Zatkoff	18,230	19–16–4	42	Recap
40	January 7	Minnesota	3–4	Los Angeles	OT	Budaj	18,230	20–16–4	44	Recap
41	January 9	Dallas	6–4	Los Angeles		Budaj	18,230	20–17–4	44	Recap
42	January 12	St. Louis	1–5	Los Angeles		Budaj	18,230	21–17–4	46	Recap
43	January 14	Winnipeg	2–3	Los Angeles	OT	Budaj	18,230	22–17–4	48	Recap
44	January 16	Tampa Bay	2–1	Los Angeles		Budaj	18,230	22–18–4	48	Recap
45	January 18	San Jose	3–2	Los Angeles		Budaj	18,230	22–19–4	48	Recap
46	January 21	Los Angeles	2–4	NY Islanders		Budaj	15,138	22–20–4	48	Recap
47	January 23	Los Angeles	2–3	NY Rangers		Zatkoff	18,006	22–21–4	48	Recap
48	January 24	Los Angeles	3–1	New Jersey		Budaj	13,412	23–21–4	50	Recap
49	January 26	Los Angeles	3–0	Carolina		Budaj	10,486	24–21–4	52	Recap
January 27–29		All-Star Break at Staples Center
50	January 31	Los Angeles	3–2	Arizona		Budaj	11,577	25–21–4	54	Recap

February: 5–6–2 (Home: 2–3–0; Road: 3–3–2)
#	Date	Visitor	Score	Home	OT	Decision	Attendance	Record	Pts	Recap
51	February 1	Colorado	0–5	Los Angeles		Budaj	18,230	26–21–4	56	Recap
52	February 4	Los Angeles	1–0	Philadelphia	OT	Budaj	19,833	27–21–4	58	Recap
53	February 5	Los Angeles	0–5	Washington		Budaj	18,506	27–22–4	58	Recap
54	February 7	Los Angeles	0–5	Tampa Bay		Budaj	19,092	27–23–4	58	Recap
55	February 9	Los Angeles	6–3	Florida		Budaj	13,451	28–23–4	60	Recap
56	February 16	Arizona	5–3	Los Angeles		Budaj	18,230	28–24–4	60	Recap
57	February 18	Florida	3–2	Los Angeles		Budaj	18,230	28–25–4	60	Recap
58	February 19	Los Angeles	0–1	Anaheim		Budaj	17,174	28–26–4	60	Recap
59	February 21	Los Angeles	2–1	Colorado		Budaj	13,768	29–26–4	62	Recap
60	February 23	Boston	4–1	Los Angeles		Budaj	18,230	29–27–4	62	Recap
61	February 25	Anaheim	1–4	Los Angeles		Quick	18,230	30–27–4	64	Recap
62	February 27	Los Angeles	4–5	Minnesota	OT	Quick	19,118	30–27–5	65	Recap
63	February 28	Los Angeles	1–2	Calgary	OT	Bishop	19,289	30–27–6	66	Recap

March: 7–6–1 (Home: 5–3–1; Road: 2–3–0)
#	Date	Visitor	Score	Home	OT	Decision	Attendance	Record	Pts	Recap
64	March 2	Toronto	2–3	Los Angeles	SO	Quick	18,230	31–27–6	68	Recap
65	March 4	Vancouver	4–3	Los Angeles		Bishop	18,230	31–28–6	68	Recap
66	March 9	Nashville	2–3	Los Angeles	OT	Quick	18,230	32–28–6	70	Recap
67	March 11	Washington	2–4	Los Angeles		Quick	18,230	33–28–6	72	Recap
68	March 13	St. Louis	3–1	Los Angeles		Quick	18,230	33–29–6	72	Recap
69	March 14	Arizona	3–2	Los Angeles	SO	Bishop	18,230	33–29–7	73	Recap
70	March 16	Buffalo	0–2	Los Angeles		Quick	18,230	34–29–7	75	Recap
71	March 19	Los Angeles	2–5	Calgary		Bishop	19,115	34–30–7	75	Recap
72	March 20	Los Angeles	0–2	Edmonton		Quick	18,347	34–31–7	75	Recap
73	March 23	Winnipeg	2–5	Los Angeles		Bishop	18,230	35–31–7	77	Recap
74	March 25	NY Rangers	3–0	Los Angeles		Quick	18,230	35–32–7	77	Recap
75	March 28	Los Angeles	1–2	Edmonton		Quick	18,347	35–33–7	77	Recap
76	March 29	Los Angeles	4–1	Calgary		Bishop	19,005	36–33–7	79	Recap
77	March 31	Los Angeles	2–0	Vancouver		Quick	18,865	37–33–7	81	Recap

April: 2–2–1 (Home: 2–1–0; Road: 0–1–1)
#	Date	Visitor	Score	Home	OT	Decision	Attendance	Record	Pts	Recap
78	April 2	Arizona	2–1	Los Angeles		Quick	18,230	37–34–7	81	Recap
79	April 4	Edmonton	4–6	Los Angeles		Quick	18,230	38–34–7	83	Recap
80	April 6	Calgary	4–1	Los Angeles		Bishop	18,230	38–35–7	83	Recap
81	April 8	Chicago	2–3	Los Angeles	OT	Quick	18,230	39–35–7	85	Recap
82	April 9	Los Angeles	3–4	Anaheim	OT	Quick	16,564	39–35–8	86	Recap

Legend: Win (2 points) Loss (0 points) Overtime/shootout loss (1 point)

== Player statistics ==
Final Stats

=== Skaters ===
Regular season
Player	GP	G	A	Pts	+/−	PIM
Jeff Carter	82	32	34	66	2	41
Anze Kopitar	76	12	40	52	−10	28
Tanner Pearson	80	24	20	44	5	13
Drew Doughty	82	12	32	44	8	46
Alec Martinez	82	9	30	39	−17	24
Dustin Brown	80	14	22	36	−4	22
Tyler Toffoli	63	16	18	34	6	22
Jake Muzzin	82	9	19	28	−21	46
Trevor Lewis	82	12	12	24	−6	30
Nic Dowd	70	6	16	22	−15	25
Marian Gaborik	56	10	11	21	−4	18
Derek Forbort	82	2	16	18	8	54
Nick Shore	70	6	11	17	−2	20
Dwight King^{‡}	63	8	7	15	0	10
Kyle Clifford	73	6	6	12	−2	92
Devin Setoguchi	45	4	8	12	−5	14
Jarome Iginla^{†}	19	6	3	9	−9	16
Jordan Nolan	46	4	4	8	−3	44
Paul LaDue	22	0	8	8	−5	4
Kevin Gravel	49	1	6	7	3	6
Adrian Kempe	25	2	4	6	−3	6
Tom Gilbert^{‡}	18	1	4	5	−4	6
Brayden McNabb	49	2	2	4	1	54
Matt Greene	26	1	1	2	3	19
Andy Andreoff	36	0	2	2	−2	70
Teddy Purcell	12	0	2	2	0	0
Jonny Brodzinski	6	0	2	2	2	2

=== Goaltenders ===
Regular season
Player	GP	GS	TOI	W	L	OT	GA	GAA	SA	SV%	SO	G	A	PIM
Peter Budaj^{‡}	53	51	3029	27	20	3	107	2.12	1286	.917	7	0	1	0
Jonathan Quick	17	17	931	8	5	2	35	2.26	421	.917	2	0	0	2
Ben Bishop^{†}	7	6	411	2	3	2	17	2.49	170	.900	0	0	0	2
Jeff Zatkoff	13	8	550	2	7	1	27	2.95	223	.879	0	0	0	0
Jack Campbell	1	0	20	0	0	0	0	0.00	5	1.000	0	0	0	0

^{†}Denotes player spent time with another team before joining the Kings. Stats reflect time with the Kings only.
^{‡}Traded mid-season. Stats reflect time with the Kings only.
Bold/italics denotes franchise record

== Transactions ==
The Kings have been involved in the following transactions during the 2016–17 season:

=== Trades ===
Date	Details		Ref
June 25, 2016	To Dallas Stars Nick Ebert	To Los Angeles Kings Jack Campbell
January 21, 2017	To Chicago Blackhawks Michael Latta	To Los Angeles Kings Cameron Schilling
February 15, 2017	To Washington Capitals Tom Gilbert	To Los Angeles Kings Future considerations
February 26, 2017	To Tampa Bay Lightning Peter Budaj; Erik Cernak; 7th-round pick in 2017 conditional 2017 pick	To Los Angeles Kings Ben Bishop; 5th-round pick in 2017
March 1, 2017	To Montreal Canadiens Dwight King	To Los Angeles Kings conditional 4th-round pick in 2018
March 1, 2017	To Colorado Avalanche conditional 4th-round pick in 2018	To Los Angeles Kings Jarome Iginla
May 9, 2017	To Dallas Stars Ben Bishop (rights)	To Los Angeles Kings MTL's 4th-round pick in 2017
May 9, 2017	To Tampa Bay Lightning LAK's 7th-round pick in 2017	To Los Angeles Kings Bokondji Imama (rights)

=== Free agents acquired ===
Date	Player	Former team	Contract terms (in U.S. dollars)	Ref
July 1, 2016	Zach Trotman	Boston Bruins	1 year, $650,000	
July 1, 2016	Michael Latta	Washington Capitals	1 year, $600,000	
July 1, 2016	Tom Gilbert	Montreal Canadiens	1 year, $1.4 million	
July 1, 2016	Jeff Zatkoff	Pittsburgh Penguins	2 years, $1.8 million	
July 6, 2016	Teddy Purcell	Florida Panthers	1 year, $1.6 million	
July 14, 2016	Patrick Bjorkstrand	KHL Medvescak Zagreb	1 year, $925,000 entry-level contract	
October 11, 2016	Devin Setoguchi	HC Davos	1 year, $575,000	
April 18, 2017	Alex Iafallo	University of Minnesota-Duluth	2 years, entry-level contract	
May 3, 2017	Oscar Fantenberg	HC Sochi	1 year, entry-level contract	

=== Free agents lost ===
Date	Player	New team	Contract terms (in U.S. dollars)	Ref
July 1, 2016	Jamie McBain	Arizona Coyotes	1 year, $650,000	
July 1, 2016	Milan Lucic	Edmonton Oilers	7 years, $42 million	
July 23, 2016	Luke Schenn	Arizona Coyotes	2 years, $2.5 million	
August 22, 2016	Jhonas Enroth	Toronto Maple Leafs	1 year, $750,000	
October 11, 2016	Kris Versteeg	Calgary Flames	1 year, $950,000	

=== Claimed via waivers ===
Player	Previous team	Date	Ref

=== Lost via waivers ===
Player	New team	Date claimed off waivers	Ref

=== Lost via retirement ===
Player	Ref

Vincent LeCavalier

=== Player signings ===
Date	Player	Contract terms (in U.S. dollars)	Ref
June 25, 2016	Trevor Lewis	4 years, $8 million contract extension	
July 11, 2016	Jack Campbell	2 years, $1.225 million	
July 11, 2016	Nic Dowd	2 years, $1.28 million	
July 11, 2016	Derek Forbort	2 years, $1.3 million	
July 14, 2016	Jacob Moverare	3 years, $2.075 million entry-level contract	
July 16, 2016	Andrew Crescenzi	1 year, $600,000	
March 6, 2017	Kale Clague	3 years, entry-level contract	
March 6, 2017	Austin Wagner	3 years, entry-level contract	
March 27, 2017	Matt Roy	2 years, entry-level contract	
April 14, 2017	Chaz Reddekopp	3 years, $2.2 million entry-level	
May 9, 2017	Tanner Pearson	4 years, $15 million	
June 1, 2017	Bokondji Imama	3 years, $2.12 million entry-level	
June 7, 2017	Tyler Toffoli	3 years, contract extension	

== Draft picks ==
Below are the Los Angeles Kings' selections at the 2016 NHL entry draft, held on June 24–25, 2016, at the First Niagara Center in Buffalo.

Round	#	Player	Pos	Nationality	College/Junior/Club team (League)
2	51	Kale Clague	D	Canada	Brandon Wheat Kings (WHL)
4	112	Jacob Moverare	D	Sweden	HV71 (SHL)
5	142	Michael Eyssimont	C	United States	St. Cloud State University NCAA
7	202	Jacob Friend	D	Canada	Owen Sound Attack (OHL)

Notes

- The Los Angeles Kings' first-round pick went to the Carolina Hurricanes as the result of a trade on February 25, 2015, that sent Andrej Sekera to Los Angeles in exchange for Roland McKeown and this pick (being conditional at the time of the trade). The condition – Carolina will receive a first-round pick in 2016 if Los Angeles fails to qualify for the 2015 Stanley Cup playoffs – was converted on April 9, 2015.
- The Los Angeles Kings' third-round pick went to the Philadelphia Flyers as the result of a trade on January 6, 2016, that sent Vincent Lecavalier and Luke Schenn to Los Angeles in exchange for Jordan Weal and this pick.
- The Los Angeles Kings' sixth-round pick went to the Philadelphia Flyers as the result of a trade on June 27, 2015, that sent Columbus' fourth-round pick in 2015 to Los Angeles in exchange for a fourth-round pick in 2015 and this pick.
