= Derek MacKenzie =

Canadian ice hockey player (born 1981)

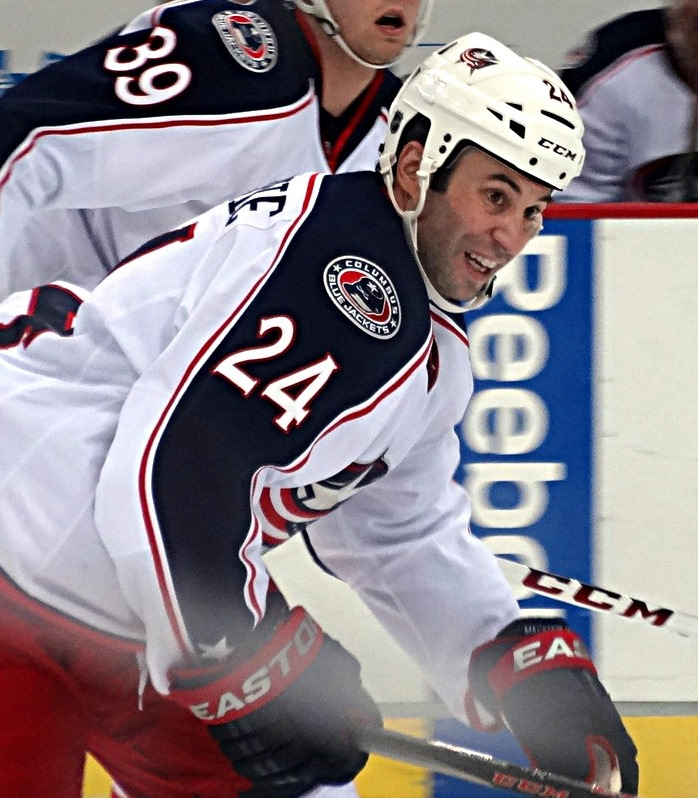
- MacKenzie with the Columbus Blue Jackets in November 2013
- Born: June 11, 1981 (age 45) Sudbury, Ontario, Canada
- Height: 5 ft 11 in (180 cm)
- Weight: 180 lb (82 kg; 12 st 12 lb)
- Position: Centre
- Shot: Left
- Played for: Atlanta Thrashers; Columbus Blue Jackets; Florida Panthers
- NHL draft: 128th overall, 1999; Atlanta Thrashers
- Playing career: 2001–2019
- Coaching career: 2019–present
Medal record
Representing Canada
World Junior Championships
Bronze medal – third place	2001 Moscow

Derek MacKenzie (born June 11, 1981) is a Canadian former professional ice hockey player who most notably played for the Atlanta Thrashers, Columbus Blue Jackets and the Florida Panthers of the National Hockey League (NHL). He is currently an assistant coach for the NHL's Nashville Predators.

He was drafted 128th overall by the Atlanta Thrashers in the 1999 NHL entry draft. He also played in the American Hockey League (AHL) for Columbus' and Atlanta's farm teams, the Syracuse Crunch and Chicago Wolves respectively. While with the Wolves, MacKenzie was part of a Calder Cup championship team in 2002 and also spent time as the team's captain. He set franchise records in career shorthanded goals for both AHL teams.

MacKenzie's father Ken is the assistant general manager of the Ontario Hockey League's Sudbury Wolves. He served as an assistant coach for the Florida Panthers until the 2021–22 NHL season, for whom he previously served as captain from 2016 to 2018. He was the head coach of the Sudbury Wolves during the 2022–23 season, and was named an assistant coach for the Predators in June 2023.

== Playing career ==
=== Amateur ===
MacKenzie began his junior career playing for his hometown Sudbury Wolves of the Ontario Hockey League (OHL). Following his second season, in which he increased his point production from 20 to 87, he was drafted by the Atlanta Thrashers in the fifth round, 128 overall, in the 1999 National Hockey League (NHL) entry draft. In his final season, he registered 40 goals and 89 points leading the Wolves in points and finishing sixth in the OHL. He also finished with a face-off winning percent of 67%, winning both the OHL and Canadian Hockey League (CHL) Face-off Awards.

=== Professional ===
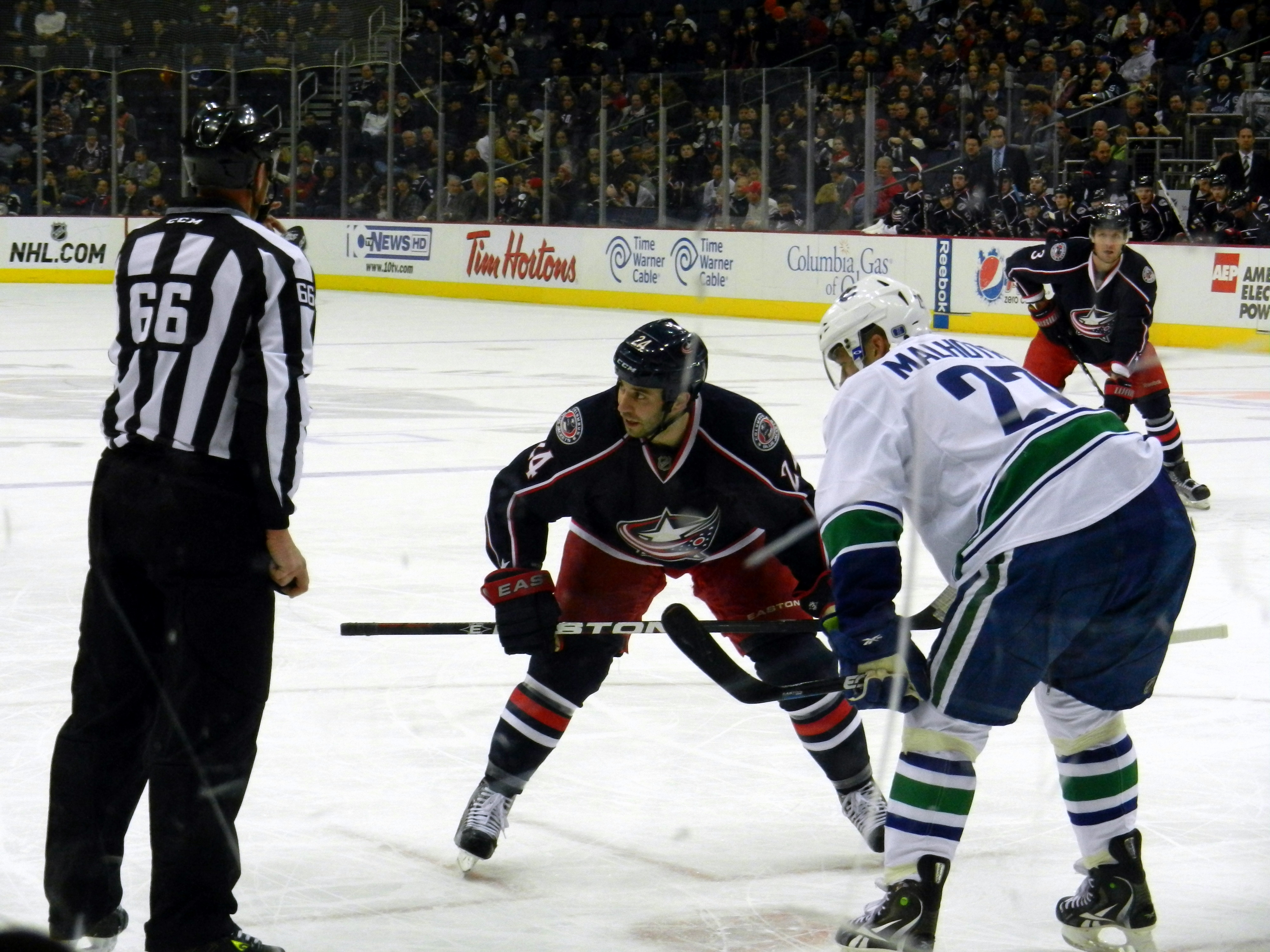
MacKenzie with the Columbus Blue Jackets and prepping for a face-off in a game against former teammate Manny Malhotra in December 2011

==== Atlanta Thrashers ====
Following his final season with Sudbury, MacKenzie joined the Thrashers' American Hockey League (AHL) affiliate, the Chicago Wolves. He registered 13 goals and 25 points. He also made his NHL debut for the Thrashers during the season, against the Columbus Blue Jackets on April 12, 2002. By season's end, the Wolves finished with 86 points and qualified for the playoffs. In the playoffs, MacKenzie helped the Wolves win their first Calder Cup championship. Over the next three seasons, MacKenzie played mainly with the Wolves, helping them back to the Calder Cup finals in 2005. The following season, he was named team captain. In the opening minutes of his first home game as captain, MacKenzie crashed into the opposing team's net and broke his ankle. He returned later in the season and helped the Wolves to the franchise's 500th win. In the game, MacKenzie scored his third career hat-trick in the 7–3 victory over the Omaha Ak-Sar-Ben Knights. He finished the season playing 36 games and registering 10 goals and 22 points, while the Wolves finished with 86 points and missed the playoffs for the first time in franchise history. MacKenzie spent one more season in the Thrashers system before becoming a free agent. He finished his Thrashers career with 2 assists and 20 penalty minutes (PIMs) in 28 NHL games, and 377 games played, 83 goals, and 184 points for Chicago. He also set a franchise record for shorthanded goals with 21.

==== Columbus Blue Jackets ====
In the off-season, MacKenzie was signed by the Columbus Blue Jackets to one-year, two-way contract. He began the season in the AHL playing for the Syracuse Crunch. He made his Blue Jackets debut on December 10, 2007, against the Anaheim Ducks; he was reassigned to Syracuse the following day. Later in the season, he was re-called and scored his first career NHL goal against Mike Smith in a game against the Tampa Bay Lightning. At the end of the season, Columbus re-signed MacKenzie to a two-year contract. He continued to split time between Columbus and Syracuse until the 2010–11 season. During his time in Syracuse, he set the Crunch team record with 11 career shorthanded goals. He established himself as an NHL regular in 2010–11 and finished the season with career highs in goals (9), assists (14), points (23) and plus-minus rating. His +14 was the highest for a forward and third-highest total in Blue Jackets history. After establishing himself, MacKenzie became a fixture on the Blue Jackets' fourth line and an integral part of their penalty kill. The following season, he spent the entire year with the Blue Jackets. Towards the end of the season, MacKenzie suffered a concussion and missed the final 16 games of the season. He finished with 7 goals and 14 points in a career-high 66 games while leading the Blue Jackets with a +4 rating. After passing an off-season physical, due to concussion concerns, Columbus re-signed MacKenzie to a two-year deal.

==== Florida Panthers ====
On July 1, 2014, MacKenzie signed a three-year contract as a free agent with the Florida Panthers. Two years later, on October 9, 2016, he was named the ninth captain in Panthers' history. On September 17, 2018, he was replaced as captain by Aleksander Barkov. After playing only one game that season, he retired in the offseason and was named an assistant coach for the Panthers on June 4, 2019.

== International play ==
Internationally, MacKenzie represented Canada at the 2001 World Junior Ice Hockey Championships. He registered a goal and three points in seven games. He also won 58.1% of his face-offs, the eight-highest percentage in the tournament. In group play, Canada went 2–1–1 to finish third in Group B. In the playoff round, Canada defeated the United States 2–1 before losing to Finland in the semi-final. Following the loss, Canada played Sweden in the bronze medal game, winning 2–1 and earning MacKenzie his lone international medal.

== Personal ==
MacKenzie is married with two children. His father, Ken MacKenzie, is the assistant general manager of the OHL's Sudbury Wolves. Mackenzie is also good friends with former NHL forward Mike Fisher, whom he played with in Sudbury.

== Career statistics ==
=== Regular season and playoffs ===
			Regular season					Playoffs
Season	Team	League	GP	G	A	Pts	PIM	GP	G	A	Pts	PIM
1996–97	Rayside-Balfour Sabrecats	NOJHL	40	23	32	55	40	9	2	11	13	12
1997–98	Sudbury Wolves	OHL	59	9	11	20	26	10	0	1	1	6
1998–99	Sudbury Wolves	OHL	68	22	65	87	74	4	2	4	6	2
1999–2000	Sudbury Wolves	OHL	68	24	33	57	110	12	5	9	14	16
2000–01	Sudbury Wolves	OHL	62	40	49	89	89	12	6	8	14	16
2001–02	Atlanta Thrashers	NHL	1	0	0	0	2	—	—	—	—	—
2001–02	Chicago Wolves	AHL	68	13	12	25	80	25	4	2	6	20
2002–03	Chicago Wolves	AHL	80	14	18	32	97	9	0	0	0	4
2003–04	Chicago Wolves	AHL	63	19	16	35	67	10	7	1	8	13
2003–04	Atlanta Thrashers	NHL	12	0	1	1	10	—	—	—	—	—
2004–05	Chicago Wolves	AHL	78	13	20	33	87	18	5	6	11	33
2005–06	Atlanta Thrashers	NHL	11	0	1	1	8	—	—	—	—	—
2005–06	Chicago Wolves	AHL	36	10	12	22	48	—	—	—	—	—
2006–07	Chicago Wolves	AHL	52	14	23	37	62	—	—	—	—	—
2006–07	Atlanta Thrashers	NHL	4	0	0	0	0	—	—	—	—	—
2007–08	Syracuse Crunch	AHL	62	25	24	49	46	13	6	8	14	22
2007–08	Columbus Blue Jackets	NHL	17	2	0	2	8	—	—	—	—	—
2008–09	Syracuse Crunch	AHL	64	22	30	52	50	—	—	—	—	—
2008–09	Columbus Blue Jackets	NHL	1	0	0	0	2	—	—	—	—	—
2009–10	Syracuse Crunch	AHL	47	17	30	47	30	—	—	—	—	—
2009–10	Columbus Blue Jackets	NHL	18	1	3	4	0	—	—	—	—	—
2010–11	Columbus Blue Jackets	NHL	63	9	14	23	22	—	—	—	—	—
2011–12	Columbus Blue Jackets	NHL	66	7	7	14	40	—	—	—	—	—
2012–13	Columbus Blue Jackets	NHL	43	3	5	8	36	—	—	—	—	—
2013–14	Columbus Blue Jackets	NHL	71	9	9	18	47	6	1	0	1	2
2014–15	Florida Panthers	NHL	82	5	6	11	45	—	—	—	—	—
2015–16	Florida Panthers	NHL	64	6	7	13	36	6	0	1	1	4
2016–17	Florida Panthers	NHL	82	6	10	16	50	—	—	—	—	—
2017–18	Florida Panthers	NHL	75	3	11	14	31	—	—	—	—	—
2018–19	Florida Panthers	NHL	1	0	0	0	0	—	—	—	—	—
AHL totals			550	147	185	332	567	75	22	17	39	92
NHL totals			611	51	74	125	337	12	1	1	2	6

=== International ===
Year	Team	Event	Result	GP	G	A	Pts	PIM
1998	Canada	U18	1st place, gold medalist(s)	3	0	1	1	4
2001	Canada	WJC	3rd place, bronze medalist(s)	7	1	2	3	4
Junior totals				10	1	3	4	8

Sporting positions
Preceded by Willie Mitchell	Florida Panthers captain 2016–18	Succeeded by Aleksander Barkov
