= 2016–17 Washington Capitals season =

NHL ice hockey team season

2016–17 Washington Capitals
- Presidents' Trophy winners
- Metropolitan Division champions
- Division: 1st Metropolitan
- Conference: 1st Eastern
- 2016–17 record: 55–19–8
- Home record: 32–7–2
- Road record: 23–12–6
- Goals for: 263
- Goals against: 182

Team information
- General manager: Brian MacLellan
- Coach: Barry Trotz
- Captain: Alexander Ovechkin
- Alternate captains: Nicklas Backstrom; Brooks Orpik
- Arena: Verizon Center
- Minor league affiliates: Hershey Bears (AHL); South Carolina Stingrays (ECHL)

Team leaders
- Goals: T. J. Oshie; Alexander Ovechkin (33)
- Assists: Nicklas Backstrom (63)
- Points: Nicklas Backstrom (86)
- Penalty minutes: Tom Wilson (133)
- Plus/minus: Brooks Orpik (+32)
- Wins: Braden Holtby (42)
- Goals against average: Philipp Grubauer (2.04)

The 2016–17 NHL season was the 43rd season for the Washington Capitals. They finished the season as Presidents' Trophy winners for the second consecutive year, and third time in team history. After defeating the Toronto Maple Leafs in the first round of NHL playoffs, in the second round of NHL playoffs the Capitals faced off against, and were beaten for the second year in a row by the Pittsburgh Penguins, the eventual Stanley Cup Champions.

== Standings ==
Metropolitan Division
Pos	Team	GP	W	L	OTL	ROW	GF	GA	GD	Pts
1	p – Washington Capitals	82	55	19	8	53	263	182	+81	118
2	x – Pittsburgh Penguins	82	50	21	11	46	282	234	+48	111
3	x – Columbus Blue Jackets	82	50	24	8	47	249	195	+54	108
4	x – New York Rangers	82	48	28	6	45	256	220	+36	102
5	New York Islanders	82	41	29	12	39	241	242	−1	94
6	Philadelphia Flyers	82	39	33	10	32	219	236	−17	88
7	Carolina Hurricanes	82	36	31	15	33	215	236	−21	87
8	New Jersey Devils	82	28	40	14	25	183	244	−61	70

Source: National Hockey League
p – Clinched Presidents' Trophy; x – Clinched playoff spot

== Schedule and results ==
=== Regular season ===
2016–17 Schedule
October: 5–2–1 (Home: 2–1–0; Road: 3–1–1), 11 Points

#	Oct	Time (ET)	Visitor	Score	Home	Location/Attendance	Record	Points
1	13	7:00 pm	Washington Capitals	2–3 SO	Pittsburgh Penguins	PPG Paints Arena (18,630)	0–0–1	1
2	15	7:00 pm	New York Islanders	1–2	Washington Capitals	Verizon Center (18,506)	1–0–1	3
3	18	7:00 pm	Colorado Avalanche	0–3	Washington Capitals	Verizon Center (18,506)	2–0–1	5
4	20	7:30 pm	Washington Capitals	4–2	Florida Panthers	BB&T Center (12,440)	3–0–1	7
5	22	7:00 pm	New York Rangers	4–2	Washington Capitals	Verizon Center (18,506)	3–1–1	7
6	26	9:30 pm	Washington Capitals	1–4	Edmonton Oilers	Rogers Place (18,347)	3–2–1	7
7	29	10:00 pm	Washington Capitals	5–2	Vancouver Canucks	Rogers Arena (18,338)	4–2–1	9
8	30	9:30 pm	Washington Capitals	3–1	Calgary Flames	Scotiabank Saddledome (18,454)	5–2–1	11

November: 8–4–1 (Home: 6–2–0; Road: 2–2–1), 17 Points

#	Nov	Time (ET)	Visitor	Score	Home	Location/Attendance	Record	Points
9	1	8:00 pm	Washington Capitals	3–2	Winnipeg Jets	MTS Centre (15,294)	6–2–1	13
10	3	7:00 pm	Winnipeg Jets	3–4 OT	Washington Capitals	Verizon Center (18,506)	7–2–1	15
11	5	7:00 pm	Florida Panthers	2–4	Washington Capitals	Verizon Center (18,506)	8–2–1	17
12	8	7:00 pm	San Jose Sharks	3–0	Washington Capitals	Verizon Center (18,506)	8–3–1	17
13	11	8:30 pm	Washington Capitals	3–2 OT	Chicago Blackhawks	United Center (22,075)	9–3–1	19
14	12	7:00 pm	Washington Capitals	1–5	Carolina Hurricanes	PNC Arena (12,436)	9–4–1	19
15	15	7:00 pm	Washington Capitals	1–2 OT	Columbus Blue Jackets	Nationwide Arena (11,738)	9–4–2	20
16	16	8:00 pm	Pittsburgh Penguins	1–7	Washington Capitals	Verizon Center (18,506)	10–4–2	22
17	18	7:00 pm	Detroit Red Wings	0–1	Washington Capitals	Verizon Center (18,506)	11–4–2	24
18	20	12:30 pm	Columbus Blue Jackets	3–2	Washington Capitals	Verizon Center (18,506)	11–5–2	24
19	23	7:00 pm	St. Louis Blues	3–4	Washington Capitals	Verizon Center (18,506)	12–5–2	26
20	25	5:00 pm	Buffalo Sabres	1–3	Washington Capitals	Verizon Center (18,506)	13–5–2	28
21	26	7:00 pm	Washington Capitals	2–4	Toronto Maple Leafs	Air Canada Centre (19,051)	13–6–2	28

December: 8–3–3 (Home: 4–2–1; Road: 4–1–2), 19 Points

#	Dec	Time (ET)	Visitor	Score	Home	Location/Attendance	Record	Points
22	1	7:00 pm	New York Islanders	3–0	Washington Capitals	Verizon Center (18,506)	13–7–2	28
23	3	7:00 pm	Washington Capitals	1–2 SO	Tampa Bay Lightning	Amalie Arena (19,092)	13–7–3	29
24	5	7:00 pm	Buffalo Sabres	2–3 OT	Washington Capitals	Verizon Center (18,506)	14–7–3	31
25	7	8:00 pm	Boston Bruins	3–4 OT	Washington Capitals	Verizon Center (18,506)	15–7–3	33
26	9	7:00 pm	Washington Capitals	4–1	Buffalo Sabres	First Niagara Center (18,234)	16–7–3	35
27	11	5:00 pm	Vancouver Canucks	0–3	Washington Capitals	Verizon Center (18,506)	17–7–3	37
28	13	7:00 pm	Washington Capitals	4–2	New York Islanders	Barclays Center (12,730)	18–7–3	39
29	16	7:30 pm	Washington Capitals	4–3 SO	Carolina Hurricanes	PNC Arena (11,892)	19–7–3	41
30	17	7:00 pm	Montreal Canadiens	2–1	Washington Capitals	Verizon Center (18,506)	19–8–3	41
31	21	8:00 pm	Washington Capitals	2–3 SO	Philadelphia Flyers	Wells Fargo Center (20,011)	19–8–4	42
32	23	7:00 pm	Tampa Bay Lightning	0–4	Washington Capitals	Verizon Center (18,506)	20–8–4	44
33	27	7:00 pm	Washington Capitals	3–4	New York Islanders	Barclays Center (15,795)	20–9–4	44
34	29	7:00 pm	New Jersey Devils	2–1 SO	Washington Capitals	Verizon Center (18,506)	20–9–5	45
35	31	1:00 pm	Washington Capitals	6–2	New Jersey Devils	Prudential Center (16,514)	21–9–5	47

January: 12–2–1 (Home: 7–0–0; Road: 5–2–1), 25 Points

#	Jan	Time (ET)	Visitor	Score	Home	Location/Attendance	Record	Points
36	1	7:30 pm	Ottawa Senators	1–2	Washington Capitals	Verizon Center (18,506)	22–9–5	49
37	3	7:00 pm	Toronto Maple Leafs	5–6 OT	Washington Capitals	Verizon Center (18,506)	23–9–5	51
38	5	7:00 pm	Columbus Blue Jackets	0–5	Washington Capitals	Verizon Center (18,506)	24–9–5	53
39	7	7:00 pm	Washington Capitals	1–0	Ottawa Senators	Canadian Tire Centre (18,685)	25–9–5	55
40	9	7:30 pm	Washington Capitals	4–1	Montreal Canadiens	Bell Centre (21,288)	26–9–5	57
41	11	8:00 pm	Pittsburgh Penguins	2–5	Washington Capitals	Verizon Center (18,506)	27–9–5	59
42	13	7:00 pm	Chicago Blackhawks	0–6	Washington Capitals	Verizon Center (18,506)	28–9–5	61
43	15	12:30 pm	Philadelphia Flyers	0–5	Washington Capitals	Verizon Center (18,506)	29–9–5	63
44	16	7:00 pm	Washington Capitals	7–8 OT	Pittsburgh Penguins	PPG Paints Arena (18,653)	29–9–6	64
45	19	8:00 pm	Washington Capitals	7–3	St. Louis Blues	Scottrade Center (19,316)	30–9–6	66
46	21	8:00 pm	Washington Capitals	4–3 OT	Dallas Stars	American Airlines Center (18,532)	31–9–6	68
47	23	7:00 pm	Carolina Hurricanes	1–6	Washington Capitals	Verizon Center (18,506)	32–9–6	70
48	24	7:30 pm	Washington Capitals	0–3	Ottawa Senators	Canadian Tire Centre (16,683)	32–10–6	70
49	26	7:00 pm	Washington Capitals	5–2	New Jersey Devils	Prudential Center (13,428)	33–10–6	72
27–29			All-Star Break in Los Angeles					
50	31	7:00 pm	Washington Capitals	2–3	New York Islanders	Barclays Center (11,240)	33–11–6	72

February: 9–2–1 (Home: 6–0–0; Road: 3–2–1), 19 Points

#	Feb	Time (ET)	Visitor	Score	Home	Location/Attendance	Record	Points
51	1	8:00 pm	Boston Bruins	3–5	Washington Capitals	Verizon Center (18,506)	34–11–6	74
52	4	1:00 pm	Washington Capitals	3–2	Montreal Canadiens	Bell Centre (21,288)	35–11–6	76
53	5	12:00 pm	Los Angeles Kings	0–5	Washington Capitals	Verizon Center (18,506)	36–11–6	78
54	7	7:00 pm	Carolina Hurricanes	0–5	Washington Capitals	Verizon Center (18,506)	37–11–6	80
55	9	7:00 pm	Detroit Red Wings	3–6	Washington Capitals	Verizon Center (18,506)	38–11–6	82
56	11	7:00 pm	Anaheim Ducks	4–6	Washington Capitals	Verizon Center (18,506)	39–11–6	84
57	18	2:00 pm	Washington Capitals	2–3 SO	Detroit Red Wings	Joe Louis Arena (20,027)	39–11–7	85
58	19	12:30 pm	Washington Capitals	1–2	New York Rangers	Madison Square Garden (18,006)	39–12–7	85
59	22	8:00 pm	Washington Capitals	4–1	Philadelphia Flyers	Wells Fargo Center (19,849)	40–12–7	87
60	24	7:00 pm	Edmonton Oilers	1–2	Washington Capitals	Verizon Center (18,506)	41–12–7	89
61	25	5:00 pm	Washington Capitals	2–5	Nashville Predators	Bridgestone Arena (17,150)	41–13–7	89
62	28	7:00 pm	Washington Capitals	4–1	New York Rangers	Madison Square Garden (18,006)	42–13–7	91

March: 9–5–1 (Home: 6–1–1; Road: 3–4–0), 19 Points

#	Mar	Time (ET)	Visitor	Score	Home	Location/Attendance	Record	Points
63	2	7:00 pm	New Jersey Devils	0–1	Washington Capitals	Verizon Center (18,506)	43–13–7	93
64	4	7:00 pm	Philadelphia Flyers	1–2 OT	Washington Capitals	Verizon Center (18,506)	44–13–7	95
65	6	7:00 pm	Dallas Stars	4–2	Washington Capitals	Verizon Center (18,506)	44–14–7	95
66	9	10:30 pm	Washington Capitals	2–4	San Jose Sharks	SAP Center (17,562)	44–15–7	95
67	11	10:30 pm	Washington Capitals	2–4	Los Angeles Kings	Staples Center (18,230)	44–16–7	95
68	12	9:30 pm	Washington Capitals	2–5	Anaheim Ducks	Honda Center (17,174)	44–17–7	95
69	14	7:00 pm	Minnesota Wild	2–4	Washington Capitals	Verizon Center (18,506)	45–17–7	97
70	16	7:00 pm	Nashville Predators	2–1 OT	Washington Capitals	Verizon Center (18,506)	45–17–8	98
71	18	7:00 pm	Washington Capitals	5–3	Tampa Bay Lightning	Amalie Arena (19,092)	46–17–8	100
72	21	7:00 pm	Calgary Flames	2–4	Washington Capitals	Verizon Center (18,506)	47–17–8	102
73	23	7:00 pm	Columbus Blue Jackets	1–2 SO	Washington Capitals	Verizon Center (18,506)	48–17–8	104
74	25	7:00 pm	Arizona Coyotes	1–4	Washington Capitals	Verizon Center (18,506)	49–17–8	106
75	28	8:00 pm	Washington Capitals	5–4 OT	Minnesota Wild	Xcel Energy Center (19,188)	50–17–8	108
76	29	10:00 pm	Washington Capitals	5–3	Colorado Avalanche	Pepsi Center (13,820)	51–17–8	110
77	31	10:00 pm	Washington Capitals	3–6	Arizona Coyotes	Gila River Arena (14,290)	51–18–8	110

April: 4–1–0 (Home: 1–1–0; Road: 3–0–0), 8 Points

#	Apr	Time (ET)	Visitor	Score	Home	Location/Attendance	Record	Points
78	2	6:00 pm	Washington Capitals	3–2	Columbus Blue Jackets	Nationwide Arena (18,247)	52–18–8	112
79	4	7:30 pm	Washington Capitals	4–1	Toronto Maple Leafs	Air Canada Centre (19,415)	53–18–8	114
80	5	8:00 pm	New York Rangers	0–2	Washington Capitals	Verizon Center (18,506)	54–18–8	116
81	8	3:00 pm	Washington Capitals	3–1	Boston Bruins	TD Garden (17,565)	55–18–8	118
82	9	7:00 pm	Florida Panthers	2–0	Washington Capitals	Verizon Center (18,506)	55–19–8	118

Legend: = Win = Loss = OT/SO Loss

=== Playoffs ===
2017 Stanley Cup playoffs
Eastern Conference First Round vs. (WC2) Toronto Maple Leafs: Washington won 4–2

Game	Date	Opponent	Score	Decision	Series
1	April 13	Toronto Maple Leafs	3–2 OT	Holtby	Washington leads 1–0
2	April 15	Toronto Maple Leafs	3–4 2OT	Holtby	Series tied 1–1
3	April 17	@ Toronto Maple Leafs	3–4 OT	Holtby	Toronto leads 2–1
4	April 19	@ Toronto Maple Leafs	5–4	Holtby	Series tied 2–2
5	April 21	Toronto Maple Leafs	2–1 OT	Holtby	Washington leads 3–2
6	April 23	@ Toronto Maple Leafs	2–1 OT	Holtby	Washington won 4–2

Eastern Conference Second Round vs. (M2) Pittsburgh Penguins: Pittsburgh won 4–3

Game	Date	Opponent	Score	Decision	Series
1	April 27	Pittsburgh Penguins	2–3	Holtby	Pittsburgh leads 1–0
2	April 29	Pittsburgh Penguins	2–6	Holtby	Pittsburgh leads 2–0
3	May 1	@ Pittsburgh Penguins	3–2 OT	Holtby	Pittsburgh leads 2–1
4	May 3	@ Pittsburgh Penguins	2–3	Holtby	Pittsburgh leads 3–1
5	May 6	Pittsburgh Penguins	4–2	Holtby	Pittsburgh leads 3–2
6	May 8	@ Pittsburgh Penguins	5–2	Holtby	Series tied 3–3
7	May 10	Pittsburgh Penguins	0–2	Holtby	Pittsburgh won 4–3

Win Loss

== Player statistics ==
Final Stats

Skaters

Regular season
Player	GP	G	A	Pts	+/−	PIM
Nicklas Backstrom	82	23	63	86	17	38
Alexander Ovechkin	82	33	36	69	6	50
Evgeny Kuznetsov	82	19	40	59	18	46
Marcus Johansson	82	24	34	58	25	10
T. J. Oshie	68	33	23	56	28	36
Justin Williams	80	24	24	48	14	50
Matt Niskanen	78	5	34	39	20	32
John Carlson	72	9	28	37	7	10
Andre Burakovsky	64	12	23	35	13	14
Dmitry Orlov	82	6	27	33	30	51
Jay Beagle	81	13	17	30	20	22
Daniel Winnik	72	12	13	25	15	49
Lars Eller	81	12	13	25	15	36
Brett Connolly	66	15	8	23	20	40
Tom Wilson	82	7	12	19	9	133
Nate Schmidt	60	3	14	17	22	16
Kevin Shattenkirk^{†}	19	2	12	14	4	10
Brooks Orpik	79	0	14	14	32	48
Karl Alzner	82	3	10	13	23	28
Jakub Vrana	21	3	3	6	2	2
Taylor Chorney	18	1	4	5	8	11
Zach Sanford^{‡}	26	2	1	3	0	6
Chandler Stephenson	4	0	0	0	0	0
Paul Carey	6	0	0	0	−2	0
Garrett Mitchell	1	0	0	0	0	0
Liam O'Brien	1	0	0	0	0	0
Riley Barber	3	0	0	0	0	0
Aaron Ness	2	0	0	0	−1	0

Playoffs
Player	GP	G	A	Pts	+/−	PIM
Nicklas Backstrom	13	6	7	13	0	2
T. J. Oshie	13	4	8	12	2	4
Evgeny Kuznetsov	13	5	5	10	−1	8
Justin Williams	13	3	6	9	0	6
Alexander Ovechkin	13	5	3	8	−4	8
Marcus Johansson	13	2	6	8	−1	2
Andre Burakovsky	13	3	3	6	5	2
Kevin Shattenkirk	13	1	5	6	−4	6
Lars Eller	13	0	5	5	−2	10
John Carlson	13	2	2	4	1	4
Nate Schmidt	11	1	3	4	6	4
Matt Niskanen	13	1	3	4	0	19
Tom Wilson	13	3	0	3	−2	34
Dmitry Orlov	13	0	3	3	−1	2
Brooks Orpik	13	0	2	2	−7	11
Karl Alzner	7	0	0	0	−1	2
Jay Beagle	13	0	0	0	−5	4
Paul Carey	1	0	0	0	0	0
Daniel Winnik	13	0	0	0	−4	0
Brett Connolly	7	0	0	0	−2	0

Goaltenders

Regular season
Player	GP	GS	TOI	W	L	OT	GA	GAA	SA	SV%	SO	G	A	PIM
Braden Holtby	63	63	3680:10	42	13	6	127	2.07	1690	.925	9	0	0	0
Philipp Grubauer	24	19	1264:34	13	6	2	43	2.04	585	.926	3	0	0	0

Playoffs
Player	GP	GS	TOI	W	L	GA	GAA	SA	SV%	SO	G	A	PIM
Braden Holtby	13	13	803:27	7	6	33	2.46	364	.909	0	0	0	2
Philipp Grubauer	1	0	18:34	0	0	2	6.46	9	.778	0	0	0	0

^{†}Denotes player spent time with another team before joining the Capitals. Stats reflect time with the Capitals only.
^{‡}Denotes player was traded mid-season. Stats reflect time with the Capitals only.
Bold/italics denotes franchise record.

== Transactions ==
The Capitals have been involved in the following transactions during the 2016–17 season.

=== Trades ===
Date	Details		Ref
June 24, 2016	To St. Louis Blues 1st-round pick in 2016	To Washington Capitals 1st-round pick in 2016; WSH's 3rd-round pick in 2016
June 24, 2016	To Montreal Canadiens 2nd-round pick in 2017; 2nd-round pick in 2018	To Washington Capitals Lars Eller
February 15, 2017	To Los Angeles Kings Future considerations	To Washington Capitals Tom Gilbert
February 27, 2017	To St. Louis Blues Zach Sanford; Brad Malone; 1st-round pick in 2017 conditional 2nd-round pick in 2019	To Washington Capitals Kevin Shattenkirk; Pheonix Copley

=== Free agents acquired ===
Date	Player	Former team	Contract terms (in U.S. dollars)	Ref
July 1, 2016	Joe Cannata	Utica Comets	1 year, $575,000	
July 1, 2016	Darren Dietz	Montreal Canadiens	1 year, $575,000	
July 1, 2016	Christian Thomas	Springfield Falcons	1 year, $575,000	
July 1, 2016	Brett Connolly	Boston Bruins	1 year, $850,000	
July 2, 2016	Brad Malone	Carolina Hurricanes	1 year, $575,000	
March 2, 2017	Mason Mitchell	University of Alaska-Anchorage	2 years, entry-level contract	
March 7, 2017	Kris Bindulis	Lake Superior State University	3 years, entry-level contract	
March 7, 2017	Hampus Gustafsson	Merrimack College	2 years, entry-level contract	

=== Free agents lost ===
Date	Player	New team	Contract terms (in U.S. dollars)	Ref
July 1, 2016	Michael Latta	Los Angeles Kings	1 year, $600,000	
July 1, 2016	Jason Chimera	New York Islanders	2 years, $4.5 million	
July 21, 2016	Erik Burgdoerfer	Buffalo Sabres	1 year, two-way contract	

=== Claimed via waivers ===
Player	Previous team	Date	Ref

=== Lost via waivers ===
Player	New team	Date	Ref

=== Lost via retirement ===
Date	Player	Ref

=== Player signings ===
Date	Player	Contract terms (in U.S. dollars)	Ref
June 24, 2016	Paul Carey	1-year, $575,000	
June 24, 2016	Aaron Ness	2-years, $1.225 million	
June 30, 2016	Zach Sill	2-years, $1.225 million	
June 30, 2016	Tom Wilson	2-years, $4 million	
July 1, 2016	Connor Hobbs	3-years, entry-level contract	
July 11, 2016	Zach Sanford	3-years, entry-level contract	
July 20, 2016	Marcus Johansson	3-years, $13.75 million	
September 21, 2016	Dmitry Orlov	1-year, $2.57 million	
March 2, 2017	Lucas Johansen	3-years, entry-level contract	
March 2, 2017	Colby Williams	2-years, entry-level contract	
March 30, 2017	Garrett Pilon	3-years, entry-level contract	
April 10, 2017	Beck Malenstyn	3-years, entry-level contract	
April 10, 2017	Nathan Walker	2-years, $1.3 million contract extension	

== Draft picks ==
Below are the Washington Capitals' selections at the 2016 NHL entry draft, held June 24–25, 2016 at the First Niagara Center in Buffalo, New York.

Round	#	Player	Pos	Nationality	College/Junior/Club team (League)
1	28^{[a]}	Lucas Johansen	D	Canada	Kelowna Rockets (WHL)
3	87^{[b]}	Garrett Pilon	C	Canada	Kamloops Blazers (WHL)
4	117	Damien Riat	LW	Switzerland	Geneve-Servette HC (NLA)
5	145^{[c]}	Beck Malenstyn	LW	Canada	Calgary Hitmen (WHL)
5	147	Axel Jonsson-Fjallby	LW	Sweden	Djurgarden-jr. (Swe-Jr)
6	177	Chase Priskie	D	United States	Quinnipiac Bobcats NCAA
7	207	Dmitriy Zaitsev	D	Russia	Wilkes-Barre/Scranton Knights (NAHL)

Draft notes

- The Washington Capitals' first-round pick went to the St. Louis Blues as the result of a trade on June 24, 2016 that sent a first-round pick and Washington's third-round pick both in 2016 (28th and 87th overall) to Washington in exchange for this pick.
- ^{[a]} The St. Louis Blues' first-round pick went to the Washington Capitals as the result of a trade on June 24, 2016 that sent a first-round pick in 2016 (26th overall) to St. Louis in exchange for Washington's third-round pick in 2016 (87th overall) and this pick.
- The Washington Capitals' second-round pick went to the Toronto Maple Leafs as the result of a trade on February 28, 2016 that sent Daniel Winnik and Anaheim's fifth-round pick in 2016 to Washington in exchange for Brooks Laich, Connor Carrick and this pick.
- ^{[b]} The Washington Capitals' third-round pick was re-acquired as the result of a trade on June 24, 2016 that sent a first-round pick in 2016 (26th overall) to St. Louis in exchange for a first-round pick in 2016 (28th overall) and this pick.

St. Louis previously acquired this pick as the result of a trade on July 2, 2015 that sent T. J. Oshie to Washington in exchange for Troy Brouwer, Pheonix Copley and this pick.

- ^{[c]} The Anaheim Ducks' fifth-round pick went to the Washington Capitals as the result of a trade on February 28, 2016 that sent Brooks Laich, Connor Carrick and a second-round pick in 2016 to Toronto in exchange for Daniel Winnik and this pick.

Toronto previously acquired this pick as the result of a trade on March 2, 2015 that sent Korbinian Holzer to Anaheim in exchange for Eric Brewer and this pick.
