= 2016–17 Florida Panthers season =

Florida Panthers season

2016–17 Florida Panthers
- Division: 6th Atlantic
- Conference: 13th Eastern
- 2016–17 record: 35–36–11
- Home record: 19–19–3
- Road record: 16–17–8
- Goals for: 210
- Goals against: 237

Team information
- General manager: Tom Rowe
- Coach: Gerard Gallant (Oct. 13 – Nov. 27); Tom Rowe (Nov. 27 – Apr. 9)
- Captain: Derek MacKenzie
- Alternate captains: Aaron Ekblad; Jussi Jokinen
- Arena: BB&T Center
- Minor league affiliate: Springfield Thunderbirds (AHL)

Team leaders
- Goals: Jonathan Marchessault (30)
- Assists: Keith Yandle (36)
- Points: Vincent Trocheck (54)
- Penalty minutes: Alex Petrovic (79)
- Plus/minus: Aleksander Barkov (+13)
- Wins: James Reimer (18)
- Goals against average: James Reimer (2.53)

The 2016–17 Florida Panthers season was the 23rd season for the National Hockey League (NHL) franchise that was established on June 14, 1993. This season saw the Panthers unable to qualify for the playoffs for the first time since the 2014–15 season.

== Standings ==
Atlantic Division
Pos	Team	GP	W	L	OTL	ROW	GF	GA	GD	Pts
1	y – Montreal Canadiens	82	47	26	9	44	226	200	+26	103
2	x – Ottawa Senators	82	44	28	10	38	212	214	−2	98
3	x – Boston Bruins	82	44	31	7	42	234	212	+22	95
4	x – Toronto Maple Leafs	82	40	27	15	39	251	242	+9	95
5	Tampa Bay Lightning	82	42	30	10	38	234	227	+7	94
6	Florida Panthers	82	35	36	11	30	210	237	−27	81
7	Detroit Red Wings	82	33	36	13	24	207	244	−37	79
8	Buffalo Sabres	82	33	37	12	31	201	237	−36	78

Source: National Hockey League
x – Clinched playoff spot; y – Clinched division

Eastern Conference Wild Card
Pos	Div	Team	GP	W	L	OTL	ROW	GF	GA	GD	Pts
1	ME	x – New York Rangers	82	48	28	6	45	256	220	+36	102
2	AT	x – Toronto Maple Leafs	82	40	27	15	39	251	242	+9	95
3	ME	New York Islanders	82	41	29	12	39	241	242	−1	94
4	AT	Tampa Bay Lightning	82	42	30	10	38	234	227	+7	94
5	ME	Philadelphia Flyers	82	39	33	10	32	219	236	−17	88
6	ME	Carolina Hurricanes	82	36	31	15	33	215	236	−21	87
7	AT	Florida Panthers	82	35	36	11	30	210	237	−27	81
8	AT	Detroit Red Wings	82	33	36	13	24	207	244	−37	79
9	AT	Buffalo Sabres	82	33	37	12	31	201	237	−36	78
10	ME	New Jersey Devils	82	28	40	14	25	183	244	−61	70

Source: National Hockey League
x – Clinched playoff spot

== Schedule and results ==
=== Pre-season ===
2016 Pre-season Game Log: 2–2–2 (Home: 2–1–1; Road: 0–1–1)
#	Date	Visitor	Score	Home	OT	Decision	Attendance	Record	Recap
1^{[A]}	September 27	Nashville	1–4	Florida		Brittain	—	0–1–0	Recap
2^{[A]}	September 27	Nashville	2–1	Florida		Luongo	—	1–1–0	Recap
3	September 29	Florida	0–2	Tampa Bay		Reimer	12,491	1–2–0	Recap
4	October 2	Dallas	2–1	Florida	OT	—	—	1–2–1	Recap
5	October 4	Florida	1–2	Dallas	SO	Reimer	14,321	1–2–2	Recap
6	October 6	Tampa Bay	Game canceled due to expected arrival of Hurricane Matthew.
7	October 8	New Jersey	2–4	Florida		—	—	2–2–2	Recap
^{A} – indicates split-squad game.

=== Regular season ===
2016–17 Game Log

October: 4–4–1 (Home: 3–1–0; Road: 1–3–1)
#	Date	Visitor	Score	Home	OT	Decision	Attendance	Record	Pts	Recap
1	October 13	New Jersey	1–2	Florida	OT	Luongo	17,128	1–0–0	2	Recap
2	October 15	Detroit	1–4	Florida		Luongo	16,868	2–0–0	4	Recap
3	October 18	Florida	3–4	Tampa Bay	SO	Reimer	19,092	2–0–1	5	Recap
4	October 20	Washington	4–2	Florida		Luongo	12,440	2–1–1	5	Recap
5	October 22	Colorado	2–5	Florida		Luongo	14,326	3–1–1	7	Recap
6	October 25	Florida	2–3	Pittsburgh		Reimer	18,434	3–2–1	7	Recap
7	October 27	Florida	2–3	Toronto		Luongo	18,979	3–3–1	7	Recap
8	October 29	Florida	0–3	Buffalo		Luongo	18,261	3–4–1	7	Recap
9	October 30	Florida	5–2	Detroit		Reimer	20,027	4–4–1	9	Recap

November: 7–6–1 (Home: 4–3–0; Road: 3–3–1)
#	Date	Visitor	Score	Home	OT	Decision	Attendance	Record	Pts	Recap
10	November 1	Boston	2–1	Florida		Luongo	13,808	4–5–1	9	Recap
11	November 3	New Jersey	3–4	Florida	OT	Reimer	11,597	5–5–1	11	Recap
12	November 5	Florida	2–4	Washington		Luongo	18,506	5–6–1	11	Recap
13	November 7	Tampa Bay	1–3	Florida		Luongo	11,703	6–6–1	13	Recap
14	November 10	San Jose	4–2	Florida		Reimer	11,703	6–7–1	13	Recap
15	November 12	NY Islanders	2–3	Florida	OT	Luongo	15,828	7–7–1	15	Recap
16	November 15	Florida	4–3	Montreal	OT	Luongo	21,288	8–7–1	17	Recap
17	November 17	Florida	1–6	Toronto		Reimer	18,931	8–8–1	17	Recap
18	November 19	Florida	4–1	Ottawa		Luongo	14,132	9–8–1	19	Recap
19	November 20	Florida	3–2	NY Rangers	SO	Reimer	18,006	10–8–1	21	Recap
20	November 22	Philadelphia	1–3	Florida		Luongo	15,515	10–9–1	21	Recap
21	November 26	Columbus	1–2	Florida	SO	Luongo	13,573	11–9–1	23	Recap
22	November 27	Florida	2–3	Carolina		Reimer	8,124	11–10–1	23	Recap
23	November 29	Florida	1–2	Chicago	SO	Luongo	21,475	11–10–2	24	Recap

December: 5–4–6 (Home: 2–2–3; Road: 3–2–3)
#	Date	Visitor	Score	Home	OT	Decision	Attendance	Record	Pts	Recap
24	December 1	Florida	2–1	Detroit	OT	Luongo	20,027	12–10–2	26	Recap
25	December 3	Florida	0–2	Ottawa		Luongo	15,149	12–11–2	26	Recap
26	December 5	Florida	3–4	Boston	OT	Luongo	17,565	12–11–3	27	Recap
27	December 6	Florida	2–3	Philadelphia	OT	Reimer	18,999	12–11–4	28	Recap
28	December 8	Pittsburgh	5–1	Florida		Luongo	14,068	12–12–4	28	Recap
29	December 10	Vancouver	2–4	Florida		Luongo	17,585	13–12–4	30	Recap
30	December 13	Florida	1–5	Minnesota		Luongo	18,754	13–13–4	30	Recap
31	December 15	Florida	3–4	Winnipeg	SO	Luongo	15,294	13–13–5	31	Recap
32	December 16	Florida	3–1	Colorado		Reimer	14,679	14–13–5	33	Recap
33	December 20	Buffalo	3–4	Florida	SO	Luongo	14,265	15–13–5	35	Recap
34	December 22	Boston	3–1	Florida		Reimer	14,462	15–14–5	35	Recap
35	December 23	Detroit	4–3	Florida	SO	Luongo	15,374	15–14–6	36	Recap
36	December 28	Toronto	3–2	Florida	SO	Luongo	16,965	15–14–7	37	Recap
37	December 29	Montreal	3–2	Florida	OT	Reimer	17,489	15–14–8	38	Recap
38	December 31	Florida	3–1	Dallas		Reimer	18,532	16–14–8	40	Recap

January: 6–5–2 (Home: 4–3–0; Road: 2–2–2)
#	Date	Visitor	Score	Home	OT	Decision	Attendance	Record	Pts	Recap
39	January 4	Winnipeg	4–1	Florida		Luongo	13,607	16–15–8	40	Recap
40	January 6	Nashville	1–2	Florida		Reimer	14,003	17–15–8	42	Recap
41	January 7	Boston	4–0	Florida		Reimer	16,630	17–16–8	42	Recap
42	January 9	Florida	3–0	New Jersey		Luongo	12,834	18–16–8	44	Recap
43	January 11	Florida	2–1	NY Islanders		Luongo	13,529	19–16–8	46	Recap
44	January 13	NY Islanders	5–2	Florida		Luongo	14,352	19–17–8	46	Recap
45	January 14	Columbus	3–4	Florida		Reimer	14,795	20–17–8	48	Recap
46	January 17	Florida	2–5	Calgary		Luongo	18,137	20–18–8	48	Recap
47	January 18	Florida	3–4	Edmonton	OT	Reimer	18,347	20–18–9	49	Recap
48	January 20	Florida	1–2	Vancouver		Luongo	18,865	20–19–9	49	Recap
49	January 23	Florida	2–3	Arizona	OT	Luongo	10,042	20–19–10	50	Recap
50	January 26	Tampa Bay	1–2	Florida	OT	Reimer	14,248	21–19–10	52	Recap
January 27–29		All-Star Break in Los Angeles
51	January 31	Ottawa	5–6	Florida		Luongo	11,933	22–19–10	54	Recap

February: 7–4–0 (Home: 2–4–0; Road: 5–0–0)
#	Date	Visitor	Score	Home	OT	Decision	Attendance	Record	Pts	Recap
52	February 3	Anaheim	1–2	Florida		Reimer	14,689	23–19–10	56	Recap
53	February 9	Los Angeles	6–3	Florida		Luongo	13,451	23–20–10	56	Recap
54	February 11	Florida	7–4	Nashville		Luongo	17,113	24–20–10	58	Recap
55	February 15	Florida	6–5	San Jose	OT	Reimer	17,562	25–20–10	60	Recap
56	February 17	Florida	4–1	Anaheim		Reimer	16,339	26–20–10	62	Recap
57	February 18	Florida	3–2	Los Angeles		Luongo	18,230	27–20–10	64	Recap
58	February 20	Florida	2–1	St. Louis		Reimer	19,239	28–20–10	66	Recap
59	February 22	Edmonton	4–3	Florida		Reimer	15,300	28–21–10	66	Recap
60	February 24	Calgary	4–2	Florida		Luongo	14,765	28–22–10	66	Recap
61	February 26	Ottawa	2–1	Florida		Reimer	14,118	28–23–10	66	Recap
62	February 28	Carolina	2–3	Florida	SO	Luongo	10,839	29–23–10	68	Recap

March: 4–10–1 (Home: 3–4–0; Road: 1–6–1)
#	Date	Visitor	Score	Home	OT	Decision	Attendance	Record	Pts	Recap
63	March 2	Florida	1–2	Philadelphia	SO	Luongo	19,650	29–23–11	69	Recap
64	March 4	Dallas	2–1	Florida		Reimer	15,713	29–24–11	69	Recap
65	March 7	NY Rangers	5–2	Florida		Reimer	16,116	29–25–11	69	Recap
66	March 10	Minnesota	7–4	Florida		Reimer	16,232	29–26–11	69	Recap
67	March 11	Florida	2–3	Tampa Bay		Reimer	19,092	29–27–11	69	Recap
68	March 14	Toronto	2–7	Florida		Reimer	17,552	30–27–11	71	Recap
69	March 16	Florida	1–2	Columbus		Reimer	14,921	30–28–11	71	Recap
70	March 17	Florida	4–3	NY Rangers	SO	Reimer	18,006	31–28–11	73	Recap
71	March 19	Florida	0–4	Pittsburgh		Reimer	18,653	31–29–11	73	Recap
72	March 21	Carolina	4–3	Florida		Berra	10,793	31–30–11	73	Recap
73	March 23	Arizona	1–3	Florida		Reimer	11,338	32–30–11	75	Recap
74	March 25	Chicago	0–7	Florida		Reimer	18,625	33–30–11	77	Recap
75	March 27	Florida	2–4	Buffalo		Reimer	18,564	33–31–11	77	Recap
76	March 28	Florida	2–3	Toronto		Berra	19,278	33–32–11	77	Recap
77	March 30	Florida	2–6	Montreal		Berra	21,288	33–33–11	77	Recap

April: 2–3–0 (Home: 1–2–0; Road: 1–1–0)
#	Date	Visitor	Score	Home	OT	Decision	Attendance	Record	Pts	Recap
78	April 1	Florida	2–5	Boston		Berra	17,565	33–34–11	77	Recap
79	April 3	Montreal	4–1	Florida		Berra	15,222	33–35–11	77	Recap
80	April 6	St. Louis	6–3	Florida		Reimer	13,194	33–36–11	77	Recap
81	April 8	Buffalo	0–3	Florida		Reimer	17,235	34–36–11	79	Recap
82	April 9	Florida	2–0	Washington		Reimer	18,506	35–36–11	81	Recap

Legend: Win (2 points) Loss (0 points) Overtime/shootout loss (1 point)

== Player stats ==
Final Stats

=== Skaters ===
Regular season
Player	GP	G	A	Pts	+/−	PIM
Vincent Trocheck	82	23	31	54	−13	43
Aleksander Barkov	61	21	31	52	13	10
Jonathan Marchessault	75	30	21	51	−21	38
Jaromir Jagr	82	16	30	46	2	56
Keith Yandle	82	5	36	41	−6	39
Reilly Smith	80	15	22	37	−13	17
Jussi Jokinen	69	11	17	28	−15	39
Jason Demers	81	9	19	28	−14	53
Jonathan Huberdeau	31	10	16	26	−2	13
Colton Sceviour	80	9	15	24	−16	25
Aaron Ekblad	68	10	11	21	−23	58
Michael Matheson	81	7	10	17	−5	36
Mark Pysyk	82	4	13	17	0	10
Derek MacKenzie	82	6	10	16	−7	50
Nick Bjugstad	54	7	7	14	−19	22
Alex Petrovic	49	1	13	14	−1	79
Denis Malgin	47	6	4	10	−5	8
Thomas Vanek^{†}	20	2	8	10	−7	6
Michael Sgarbossa^{†}	29	2	5	7	−3	9
Jared McCann	29	1	6	7	−1	4
Greg McKegg^{‡}	31	3	3	6	−5	11
Seth Griffith^{†}	21	0	5	5	6	8
Shawn Thornton	50	2	2	4	−7	67
Jakub Kindl	39	0	4	4	−11	28
Shane Harper^{‡}	14	2	1	3	−1	18
Kyle Rau	24	2	1	3	−3	4
Paul Thompson	21	0	3	3	−4	22
Dylan McIlrath^{†‡}	5	1	0	1	−2	10
Ian McCoshen	3	0	1	1	0	0
Steven Kampfer^{‡}	1	0	0	0	−1	4
MacKenzie Weegar	3	0	0	0	0	4

=== Goaltenders ===
Regular season
Player	GP	GS	TOI	W	L	OT	GA	GAA	SA	SV%	SO	G	A	PIM
James Reimer	43	39	2324:35	18	16	5	98	2.53	1222	.920	3	0	0	2
Roberto Luongo	40	39	2336:34	17	15	6	104	2.68	1217	.915	1	0	1	4
Reto Berra	7	4	313:07	0	5	0	18	3.45	145	.876	0	0	0	0

^{†}Denotes player spent time with another team before joining the Panthers. Stats reflect time with the Panthers only.
^{‡}Denotes player was traded mid-season. Stats reflect time with the Panthers only.
Bold/italics denotes franchise record.

== Transactions ==
The Panthers were involved in the following transactions during the 2016–17 season:

=== Trades ===
Date	Details		Ref
June 25, 2016	To Buffalo Sabres Dmitri Kulikov; VAN's 2nd-round pick in 2016	To Florida Panthers Mark Pysyk; 2nd-round pick in 2016; STL's 3rd-round pick in 2016
June 25, 2016	To Boston Bruins 7th-round pick in 2017	To Florida Panthers 7th-round pick in 2016
August 25, 2016	To Arizona Coyotes Lawson Crouse; Dave Bolland	To Florida Panthers 3rd-round pick in 2017 conditional 2nd-round pick in 2018
October 8, 2016	To Montreal Canadiens Jonathan Racine	To Florida Panthers Tim Bozon
October 11, 2016	To Carolina Hurricanes Connor Brickley	To Florida Panthers Brody Sutter
November 8, 2016	To New York Rangers Steven Kampfer conditional 7th-round pick in 2018	To Florida Panthers Dylan McIlrath
November 16, 2016	To Anaheim Ducks Logan Shaw	To Florida Panthers Michael Sgarbossa
March 1, 2017	To Detroit Red Wings Dylan McIlrath conditional 3rd-round pick in 2017	To Florida Panthers Thomas Vanek
March 1, 2017	To Tampa Bay Lightning Mike McKenna	To Florida Panthers Adam Wilcox
March 1, 2017	To New Jersey Devils Shane Harper	To New Jersey Devils Reece Scarlett

=== Free agents acquired ===
Date	Player	Former team	Contract terms (in U.S. dollars)	Ref
July 1, 2016	James Reimer	San Jose Sharks	5 years, $17 million	
July 1, 2016	Colton Sceviour	Dallas Stars	2 years, $1.9 million	
July 1, 2016	Jonathan Marchessault	Tampa Bay Lightning	2 years, $1.5 million	
July 1, 2016	Jason Demers	Dallas Stars	5 years, $22.5 million	

=== Free agents lost ===
Date	Player	New team	Contract terms (in U.S. dollars)	Ref
July 1, 2016	Brian Campbell	Chicago Blackhawks	1 year, $1.5 million	
July 1, 2016	Quinton Howden	Winnipeg Jets	1 year, $650,000	
July 1, 2016	Al Montoya	Montreal Canadiens	1 year, $950,000	
July 6, 2016	Teddy Purcell	Los Angeles Kings	1 year, $1.6 million	
July 7, 2016	Garrett Wilson	Pittsburgh Penguins	1 year, $575,000	
August 24, 2016	Jiri Hudler	Dallas Stars	1 year, $2 million	

=== Claimed via waivers ===
Player	Former team	Date claimed off waivers	Ref
Seth Griffith	Toronto Maple Leafs	November 12, 2016	

=== Lost via waivers ===
Player	New team	Date claimed off waivers	Ref
Seth Griffith	Toronto Maple Leafs	January 20, 2017	
Greg McKegg	Tampa Bay Lightning	February 27, 2017	

=== Lost via retirement ===
Player	Ref

=== Player signings ===
Date	Player	Contract terms (in U.S. dollars)	Ref
June 24, 2016	Keith Yandle	7 years, $44.5 million	
June 27, 2016	Connor Brickley	1 year, $650,000	
June 27, 2016	Sam Brittain	1 year, $750,000	
June 29, 2016	Greg McKegg	1 year, $700,000	
July 1, 2016	Ian McCoshen	3 years, entry-level contract	
July 1, 2016	Aaron Ekblad	8 years, $60 million contract extension	
July 3, 2016	Vincent Trocheck	6 years, $28.5 million	
July 3, 2016	Reilly Smith	5 years, $25 million contract extension	
July 6, 2016	Derek MacKenzie	2 years, $2.7 million contract extension	
July 20, 2016	Logan Shaw	1 year, $660,000	
July 21, 2016	Jonathan Racine	1 year, $660,000	
July 25, 2016	Denis Malgin	3 years, $2.08 million entry-level contract	
September 6, 2016	Jonathan Huberdeau	6 years, $35.4 million contract extension	
September 6, 2016	Thomas Schemitsch	3 years, $2.775 million entry-level contract	
May 31, 2017	Maxim Mamin	2 years, entry-level contract	
May 31, 2017	Henrik Haapala	2 years, $2.7 million entry-level contract	

== Draft picks ==
Below are the Florida Panthers' selections at the 2016 NHL entry draft, to be held on June 24–25, 2016 at the First Niagara Center in Buffalo, New York.

Round	#	Player	Pos	Nationality	College/Junior/Club team (League)
1	23	Henrik Borgstrom	C	Finland	HIFK JR. (FIN-Jr.)
2	38^{[a]}	Adam Mascherin	LW	Canada	Kitchener Rangers (OHL)
3	89^{[b]}	Linus Nassen	D	Sweden	Lulea HF (SHL)
4	94^{[c]}	Jonathan Ang	C	Canada	Peterborough Petes (OHL)
4	114	Riley Stillman	D	Canada	Oshawa Generals (OHL)
6	175^{[d]}	Maxim Mamin	C/RW	Russia	CSKA Moscow (KHL)
7	195^{[e]}	Benjamin Finkelstein	D	United States	Kimball Union Academy Wildcats (US-NH HS)

Notes

- ^{[a]} The Buffalo Sabres' second-round pick went to the Florida Panthers as the result of a trade on June 25, 2016 that sent Dmitri Kulikov and Vancouver's second-round pick in 2016 (33rd overall) to Buffalo in exchange for Mark Pysyk, St. Louis' third-round pick in 2016 (89th overall) and this pick.
- The Florida Panthers' second-round pick went to the Calgary Flames as the result of a trade on February 27, 2016 that sent Jiri Hudler to Florida in exchange for a fourth-round pick in 2018 and this pick.
- The Florida Panthers' third-round pick went to the Edmonton Oilers as the result of a trade on February 27, 2016 that sent Teddy Purcell to Florida in exchange for this pick (being conditional at the time of the trade). The condition – Edmonton will receive the lower of Minnesota or Florida's third-round pick in 2016 – was converted on April 24, 2016 when Minnesota was eliminated from the 2016 Stanley Cup playoffs ensuring that the Florida's pick would be lower than Minnesota's.
- ^{[b]} The St. Louis Blues' third-round pick went to the Florida Panthers as the result of a trade on June 25, 2016 that sent Dmitri Kulikov and Vancouver's second-round pick in 2016 (33rd overall) to Buffalo in exchange for Mark Pysyk, a second-round pick in 2016 (38th overall) and this pick.

Buffalo previously acquired this pick as the result of a trade on February 28, 2014 that sent Ryan Miller, Steve Ott and conditional second and third-round picks in 2014 to St. Louis in exchange for Jaroslav Halak, Chris Stewart, William Carrier, a first-round pick in 2015 and this pick (being conditional at the time of the trade). The condition – Buffalo will receive a third-round pick in 2016 if Miller does not re-sign with St. Louis for the 2014–15 NHL season – was converted on July 1, 2014 when Miller signed with Vancouver.

- ^{[c]} The Vancouver Canucks' fourth-round pick went to the Florida Panthers as the result of a trade on May 25, 2016 that sent Erik Gudbranson and the Islanders fifth-round pick in 2016 to Vancouver in exchange for Jared McCann, a second-round pick in 2016 and this pick.
- The Florida Panthers' fifth-round pick went to the St. Louis Blues as the result of a trade on June 25, 2016 that sent a fifth-round pick in 2017 to Chicago in exchange for this pick.

Chicago previously acquired this pick as the result of a trade on March 2, 2014 that sent Brandon Pirri to Florida in exchange for a third-round pick in 2014 and this pick.

- The Florida Panthers' sixth-round pick went to the New York Rangers as the result of a trade on June 20, 2016 that sent Keith Yandle to Florida in exchange for a conditional fourth-round pick in 2017 and this pick.
- ^{[d]} The Anaheim Ducks' sixth-round pick went to the Florida Panthers as the result of a trade on February 29, 2016 that sent Brandon Pirri to Anaheim in exchange for this pick.
- ^{[e]} The Boston Bruins' seventh-round pick went to the Florida Panthers as the result of a trade on June 25, 2016 that sent a seventh-round pick in 2017 to Boston in exchange for this pick.
- The Florida Panthers' seventh-round pick went to the Minnesota Wild as the result of a trade on February 24, 2015 that sent a third-round pick in 2016 to Florida in exchange for Sean Bergenheim and this pick.
