= 2016–17 New York Islanders season =

Professional ice hockey team season

2016–17 New York Islanders
- Division: 5th Metropolitan
- Conference: 9th Eastern
- 2016–17 record: 41–29–12
- Home record: 22–12–7
- Road record: 19–17–5
- Goals for: 241
- Goals against: 242

Team information
- General manager: Garth Snow
- Coach: Jack Capuano (Oct. 9 – Jan. 17); Doug Weight (Jan. 17 – Apr. 9)
- Captain: John Tavares
- Alternate captains: Cal Clutterbuck; Travis Hamonic; Andrew Ladd
- Arena: Barclays Center
- Minor league affiliates: Bridgeport Sound Tigers (AHL); Missouri Mavericks (ECHL)

Team leaders
- Goals: Anders Lee (34)
- Assists: Josh Bailey (43)
- Points: John Tavares (66)
- Penalty minutes: Travis Hamonic (60)
- Plus/minus: Dennis Seidenberg (+25)
- Wins: Thomas Greiss (26)
- Goals against average: Thomas Greiss (2.69)

The 2016–17 New York Islanders season was the 45th season in the franchise's history. It was their second season in the Barclays Center in the New York City borough of Brooklyn, which they moved into after leaving Nassau Veterans Memorial Coliseum in Nassau County on Long Island at the conclusion of the 2014–15 season. The Islanders attempted to improve upon their 45–27–10 record from the previous season, in which they defeated the Florida Panthers to win their first playoff series since 1993, but fell to the Tampa Bay Lightning in five games in the second round. However, they were unable to accomplish this as they finished the season with a 41–29–12 record, missing the playoffs by one point to the Toronto Maple Leafs.

== Standings ==
Metropolitan Division
Pos	Team	GP	W	L	OTL	ROW	GF	GA	GD	Pts
1	p – Washington Capitals	82	55	19	8	53	263	182	+81	118
2	x – Pittsburgh Penguins	82	50	21	11	46	282	234	+48	111
3	x – Columbus Blue Jackets	82	50	24	8	47	249	195	+54	108
4	x – New York Rangers	82	48	28	6	45	256	220	+36	102
5	New York Islanders	82	41	29	12	39	241	242	−1	94
6	Philadelphia Flyers	82	39	33	10	32	219	236	−17	88
7	Carolina Hurricanes	82	36	31	15	33	215	236	−21	87
8	New Jersey Devils	82	28	40	14	25	183	244	−61	70

Source: National Hockey League
p – Clinched Presidents' Trophy; x – Clinched playoff spot

Eastern Conference Wild Card
Pos	Div	Team	GP	W	L	OTL	ROW	GF	GA	GD	Pts
1	ME	x – New York Rangers	82	48	28	6	45	256	220	+36	102
2	AT	x – Toronto Maple Leafs	82	40	27	15	39	251	242	+9	95
3	ME	New York Islanders	82	41	29	12	39	241	242	−1	94
4	AT	Tampa Bay Lightning	82	42	30	10	38	234	227	+7	94
5	ME	Philadelphia Flyers	82	39	33	10	32	219	236	−17	88
6	ME	Carolina Hurricanes	82	36	31	15	33	215	236	−21	87
7	AT	Florida Panthers	82	35	36	11	30	210	237	−27	81
8	AT	Detroit Red Wings	82	33	36	13	24	207	244	−37	79
9	AT	Buffalo Sabres	82	33	37	12	31	201	237	−36	78
10	ME	New Jersey Devils	82	28	40	14	25	183	244	−61	70

Source: National Hockey League
x – Clinched playoff spot

== Schedule and results ==
=== Pre-season ===
2016 Pre-season Game Log: 4–4–0 (Home: 3–1–0; Road: 1–3–0)

#	Date	Visitor	Score	Home	OT	Decision	Attendance	Record	Recap
1	September 26	Philadelphia	1–4	NY Islanders		Berube	—	1–0–0	
2^{[A]}	September 27	NY Islanders	0–4	Philadelphia		Gibson	17,721	1–1–0	
3^{[A]}	September 27	NY Islanders	2–5	NY Rangers		Berube	17,228	1–2–0	
4	October 1	Washington	2–1	NY Islanders^{[B]}		Berube	––	1–3–0	
5	October 3	New Jersey	3–4	NY Islanders		Greiss	5,978	2–3–0	
6	October 4	NY Rangers	2–3	NY Islanders	OT	Berube	10,244	3–3–0	
7	October 5	NY Islanders	3–2	New Jersey		Greiss	7,714	4–3–0	
8	October 9	NY Islanders	0–4	Washington		Halak	14,329	4–4–0	
^{A} – indicates split-squad game.^{B} – game played at Webster Bank Arena in Bridgeport, Connecticut.
Legend: Win Loss Overtime/shootout loss

=== Regular season ===
2016–17 Game Log
October: 4–5–0 (Home: 4–2–0; Road: 0–3–0)

#	Date	Visitor	Score	Home	OT	Decision	Attendance	Record	Pts	Recap
1	October 13	NY Islanders	3–5	NY Rangers		Halak	18,200	0–1–0	0	
2	October 15	NY Islanders	1–2	Washington		Greiss	18,506	0–2–0	0	
3	October 16	Anaheim	2–3	NY Islanders	OT	Halak	15,795	1–2–0	2	
4	October 18	San Jose	3–2	NY Islanders		Halak	10,772	1–3–0	2	
5	October 21	Arizona	2–3	NY Islanders		Halak	13,076	2–3–0	4	
6	October 23	Minnesota	3–6	NY Islanders		Greiss	11,583	3–3–0	6	
7	October 26	Montreal	3–2	NY Islanders		Greiss	12,194	3–4–0	6	
8	October 27	NY Islanders	2–4	Pittsburgh		Halak	18,422	3–5–0	6	
9	October 30	Toronto	1–5	NY Islanders		Greiss	12,057	4–5–0	8	

November: 4–5–4 (Home: 3–2–3; Road: 1–3–1)

#	Date	Visitor	Score	Home	OT	Decision	Attendance	Record	Pts	Recap
10	November 1	Tampa Bay	6–1	NY Islanders		Greiss	10,822	4–6–0	8	
11	November 3	Philadelphia	3–2	NY Islanders	SO	Halak	11,119	4–6–1	9	
12	November 5	Edmonton	4–3	NY Islanders	SO	Halak	13,862	4–6–2	10	
13	November 7	Vancouver	2–4	NY Islanders		Halak	12,514	5–6–2	12	
14	November 10	NY Islanders	1–4	Tampa Bay		Halak	19,092	5–7–2	12	
15	November 12	NY Islanders	2–3	Florida	OT	Halak	15,828	5–7–3	13	
16	November 14	Tampa Bay	4–0	NY Islanders		Halak	12,498	5–8–3	13	
17	November 18	Pittsburgh	3–2	NY Islanders	OT	Halak	13,365	5–8–4	14	
18	November 22	NY Islanders	3–2	Anaheim	SO	Greiss	15,161	6–8–4	16	
19	November 23	NY Islanders	2–4	Los Angeles		Halak	18,230	6–9–4	16	
20	November 25	NY Islanders	2–3	San Jose		Greiss	17,562	6–10–4	16	
21	November 28	Calgary	1–2	NY Islanders	OT	Greiss	10,772	7–10–4	18	
22	November 30	Pittsburgh	3–5	NY Islanders		Greiss	12,149	8–10–4	20	

December: 7–5–2 (Home: 4–3–1; Road: 3–2–1)

#	Date	Visitor	Score	Home	OT	Decision	Attendance	Record	Pts	Recap
23	December 1	NY Islanders	3–0	Washington		Halak	18,506	9–10–4	22	
24	December 4	Detroit	4-3	NY Islanders	OT	Halak	13,789	9–10–5	23	
25	December 6	NY Rangers	2–4	NY Islanders		Halak	15,795	10–10–5	25	
26	December 8	St. Louis	2–3	NY Islanders		Greiss	11,178	11–10–5	27	
27	December 10	NY Islanders	2–6	Columbus		Halak	16,928	11–11–5	27	
28	December 13	Washington	4–2	NY Islanders		Halak	12,730	11–12–5	27	
29	December 15	Chicago	5–4	NY Islanders		Greiss	12,504	11–13–5	27	
30	December 16	NY Islanders	2–3	Buffalo	OT	Berube	18,903	11–13–6	28	
31	December 18	Ottawa	6–2	NY Islanders		Berube	13,102	11–14–6	28	
32	December 20	NY Islanders	4–2	Boston		Greiss	17,565	12–14–6	30	
33	December 23	Buffalo	1–5	NY Islanders		Greiss	13,852	13–14–6	32	
34	December 27	Washington	3–4	NY Islanders		Halak	15,795	14–14–6	34	
35	December 29	NY Islanders	4–6	Minnesota		Berube	19,252	14–15–6	34	
36	December 31	NY Islanders	6–2	Winnipeg		Greiss	15,294	15–15–6	36	

January: 7–2–3 (Home: 5–1–1; Road: 2–1–2)

#	Date	Visitor	Score	Home	OT	Decision	Attendance	Record	Pts	Recap
37	January 6	NY Islanders	1–2	Colorado	OT	Greiss	14,788	15–15–7	37	
38	January 7	NY Islanders	1–2	Arizona	SO	Greiss	12,380	15–15–8	38	
39	January 11	Florida	2–1	NY Islanders		Greiss	13,529	15–16–8	38	
40	January 13	NY Islanders	5–2	Florida		Greiss	14,352	16–16–8	40	
41	January 14	NY Islanders	4–7	Carolina		Greiss	16,640	16–17–8	40	
42	January 16	NY Islanders	4–0	Boston		Greiss	17,565	17–17–8	42	
43	January 19	Dallas	0–3	NY Islanders		Greiss	12,630	18–17–8	44	
44	January 21	Los Angeles	2–4	NY Islanders		Berube	15,138	19–17–8	46	
45	January 22	Philadelphia	3–2	NY Islanders	OT	Greiss	13,146	19–17–9	47	
46	January 24	Columbus	2–4	NY Islanders		Greiss	11,419	20–17–9	49	
47	January 26	Montreal	1–3	NY Islanders		Greiss	12,019	21–17–9	51	
January 27–29		All-Star Break in Los Angeles								
48	January 31	Washington	2–3	NY Islanders		Greiss	11,240	22–17–9	53	

February: 7–5–1 (Home: 4–0–1; Road: 3–5–0)

#	Date	Visitor	Score	Home	OT	Decision	Attendance	Record	Pts	Recap
49	February 3	NY Islanders	4–5	Detroit		Greiss	20,027	22–18–9	53	
50	February 4	Carolina	5–4	NY Islanders	OT	Berube	14,153	22–18–10	54	
51	February 6	Toronto	5–6	NY Islanders	OT	Greiss	11,828	23–18–10	56	
52	February 9	NY Islanders	3–1	Philadelphia		Greiss	19,737	24–18–10	58	
53	February 11	NY Islanders	0–3	Ottawa		Greiss	18,211	24–19–10	58	
54	February 12	Colorado	1–5	NY Islanders		Berube	14,107	25–19–10	60	
55	February 14	NY Islanders	1–7	Toronto		Greiss	18,956	25–20–10	60	
56	February 16	NY Rangers	2–4	NY Islanders		Greiss	15,795	26–20–10	62	
57	February 18	NY Islanders	2–3	New Jersey		Greiss	16,514	26–21–10	62	
58	February 19	New Jersey	4–6	NY Islanders		Berube	15,795	27–21–10	64	
59	February 21	NY Islanders	3–1	Detroit		Greiss	20,027	28–21–10	66	
60	February 23	NY Islanders	3–0	Montreal		Greiss	21,288	29–21–10	68	
61	February 25	NY Islanders	0–7	Columbus		Greiss	18,183	29–22–10	68	

March: 7–7–2 (Home: 1–4–1; Road: 6–3–1)

#	Date	Visitor	Score	Home	OT	Decision	Attendance	Record	Pts	Recap
62	March 2	NY Islanders	5–4	Dallas		Greiss	17,438	30–22–10	70	
63	March 3	NY Islanders	1–2	Chicago	SO	Greiss	21,883	30–22–11	71	
64	March 5	NY Islanders	2–5	Calgary		Greiss	18,741	30–23–11	71	
65	March 7	NY Islanders	4–1	Edmonton		Greiss	18,347	31–23–11	73	
66	March 9	NY Islanders	4–3	Vancouver	OT	Greiss	18,406	32–23–11	75	
67	March 11	NY Islanders	3–4	St. Louis		Greiss	19,505	32–24–11	75	
68	March 13	Carolina	8–4	NY Islanders		Greiss	12,785	32–25–11	75	
69	March 14	NY Islanders	3–2	Carolina	OT	Greiss	8,707	33–25–11	77	
70	March 16	Winnipeg	4–2	NY Islanders		Greiss	13,700	33–26–11	77	
71	March 18	Columbus	3–2	NY Islanders	OT	Greiss	14,007	33–26–12	78	
72	March 22	NY Islanders	3–2	NY Rangers		Greiss	18,006	34–26–12	80	
73	March 24	NY Islanders	4–3	Pittsburgh	SO	Halak	18,659	35–26–12	82	
74	March 25	Boston	2–1	NY Islanders		Greiss	15,795	35–27–12	82	
75	March 27	Nashville	3–1	NY Islanders		Greiss	11,671	35–28–12	82	
76	March 30	NY Islanders	3–6	Philadelphia		Halak	19,703	35–29–12	82	
77	March 31	New Jersey	1–2	NY Islanders		Halak	13,766	36–29–12	84	

April: 5–0–0 (Home: 1–0–0; Road: 4–0–0)

#	Date	Visitor	Score	Home	OT	Decision	Attendance	Record	Pts	Recap
78	April 2	NY Islanders	4–2	Buffalo		Halak	19,070	37–29–12	86	
79	April 4	NY Islanders	2–1	Nashville	OT	Halak	17,113	38–29–12	88	
80	April 6	NY Islanders	3–0	Carolina		Halak	9,769	39–29–12	90	
81	April 8	NY Islanders	4–2	New Jersey		Halak	16,514	40–29–12	92	
82	April 9	Ottawa	2–4	NY Islanders		Greiss	13,303	41–29–12	94	

Legend: Win (2 points) Loss (0 points) Overtime/shootout loss (1 point)

== Player statistics ==
Final Stats

Skaters

Regular season
Player	GP	G	A	Pts	+/−	PIM
John Tavares	77	28	38	66	4	38
Josh Bailey	82	13	43	56	5	12
Anders Lee	81	34	18	52	9	56
Nick Leddy	81	11	35	46	−3	12
Brock Nelson	81	20	25	45	−6	36
Jason Chimera	82	20	13	33	1	40
Andrew Ladd	78	23	8	31	−14	45
Ryan Strome	69	13	17	30	−8	40
Casey Cizikas	59	8	17	25	9	30
Calvin de Haan	82	5	20	25	15	36
Anthony Beauvillier	66	9	15	24	1	10
Nikolay Kulemin	72	12	11	23	3	18
Johnny Boychuk	66	6	17	23	11	19
Dennis Seidenberg	73	5	17	22	25	32
Cal Clutterbuck	66	5	15	20	2	28
Thomas Hickey	76	4	16	20	−1	35
Shane Prince	50	5	13	18	−9	18
Alan Quine	61	5	13	18	−2	8
Travis Hamonic	49	3	11	14	−21	60
Joshua Ho-Sang	21	4	6	10	1	12
Adam Pelech	44	3	7	10	−5	6
Scott Mayfield	25	2	7	9	−1	35
Stephen Gionta	26	1	5	6	9	2
Ryan Pulock	1	0	0	0	1	0
Mathew Barzal	2	0	0	0	−2	6
Connor Jones	4	0	0	0	1	2
Bracken Kearns	2	0	0	0	−1	2

Goaltenders

Regular season
Player	GP	GS	TOI	W	L	OT	GA	GAA	SA	SV%	SO	G	A	PIM
Thomas Greiss	51	49	2,813:17	26	18	5	126	2.69	1,453	0.913	3	0	1	0
Jaroslav Halak	28	26	1,605:29	12	9	5	75	2.80	885	0.915	2	0	1	0
Jean-Francois Berube	14	7	526:49	3	2	2	30	3.42	271	0.889	0	0	0	0

^{†}Denotes player spent time with another team before joining the Islanders. Stats reflect time with the Islanders only.
^{‡}Denotes player was traded mid-season. Stats reflect time with the Islanders only.
Bold/italics denotes franchise record.

== Awards and honours ==
=== Awards ===
Regular season
Player	Award	Awarded

=== Milestones ===
Regular season
Player	Milestone	Reached
Anthony Beauvillier	1st career NHL game 1st career NHL point 1st career NHL assist	October 13, 2016
Mathew Barzal	1st career NHL game	October 15, 2016
Anthony Beauvillier	1st career NHL goal	October 18, 2016
Travis Hamonic	400th career NHL game	October 21, 2016
Johnny Boychuk	100th career NHL assist	October 21, 2016
Ryan Strome	100th career NHL point	October 23, 2016
Casey Cizikas	300th career NHL game	November 1, 2016
Ryan Strome	200th career NHL game	November 3, 2016
John Tavares	500th career NHL point	January 13, 2016
Jason Chimera	1000th career NHL game	February 4, 2017
Joshua Ho-Sang	1st career NHL game	March 2, 2017
Joshua Ho-Sang	1st career NHL goal 1st career NHL point	March 7, 2017
Joshua Ho-Sang	1st career NHL assist	March 11, 2017

== Transactions ==
Following the end of the Islanders' 2015–16 season, and during the 2016–17 season, this team has been involved in the following transactions:

=== Trades ===
Date	Details		Ref
June 25, 2016	To Chicago Blackhawks 4th-round pick in 2016; 6th-round pick in 2017	To New York Islanders CBJ's 4th-round pick in 2016
June 25, 2016	To Philadelphia Flyers 4th-round pick in 2017	To New York Islanders SJS's 4th-round pick in 2016

=== Free agents acquired ===
Date	Player	Former team	Contract terms (in U.S. dollars)	Ref
July 1, 2016	Jason Chimera	Washington Capitals	2-year, $4.5 million	
July 1, 2016	Andrew Ladd	Chicago Blackhawks	7-year, $38.5 million	
July 2, 2016	P. A. Parenteau	Toronto Maple Leafs	1-year, $1.25 million	
September 28, 2016	Dennis Seidenberg	Boston Bruins	1-year, $1 million	
February 22, 2017	Connor Jones	Bridgeport Sound Tigers	1-year, $575,000	
March 27, 2017	John Stevens	Northeastern University	2-year, entry-level contract	
March 29, 2017	Tanner Fritz	Bridgeport Sound Tigers	2-year, entry-level contract	

=== Free agents lost ===
Date	Player	New team	Contract terms (in U.S. dollars)	Ref
July 1, 2016	Brian Strait	Winnipeg Jets	1-year, $600,000	
July 1, 2016	Kyle Okposo	Buffalo Sabres	7-year, $42 million	
July 1, 2016	Frans Nielsen	Detroit Red Wings	6-year, $31.5 million	
July 1, 2016	Matt Martin	Toronto Maple Leafs	4-year, $10 million	
July 1, 2016	Joe Whitney	Colorado Avalanche	1-year, $600,000	
July 4, 2016	Marc-Andre Cliche	Toronto Marlies	1-year, $700,000	
July 9, 2016	Mike Halmo	Tampa Bay Lightning	1-year, $550,000	
August 30, 2016	Kevin Czuczman	Manitoba Moose	1-year, $700,000	
September 8, 2016	James Wright	Admiral Vladivostok	1-year, $800,000	

=== Claimed via waivers ===
Player	Previous team	Date

=== Lost via waivers ===
Player	New team	Date
P. A. Parenteau	New Jersey Devils	October 10, 2016

=== Player signings ===
Date	Player	Contract terms (in U.S. dollars)	Ref
July 1, 2016	Shane Prince	2-year, $1.7 million	
July 5, 2016	Jean-Francois Berube	1-year, $675,000	
July 12, 2016	Scott Mayfield	2-year, $1.25 million	
July 13, 2016	Alan Quine	2-year, $1.225 million	
July 22, 2016	Eric Boulton	1-year, $575,000	
August 15, 2016	Christopher Gibson	1-year, $660,000	
September 20, 2016	Ryan Strome	2-year, $5 million	
October 12, 2016	Mitchell Vande Sompel	3-year, entry-level contract	
March 28, 2017	Jake Bischoff	2-year, entry-level contract	
April 24, 2017	Dennis Seidenberg	1-year, $1.25 million contract extension	
May 11, 2017	Linus Soderstrom	3-year, $2.775 million entry-level contract	

== Draft picks ==
Below are the New York Islanders' selections at the 2016 NHL entry draft, held June 24–25, 2016 at the First Niagara Center in Buffalo, New York.

Round	#	Player	Pos	Nationality	College/Junior/Club team (League)
1	19	Kieffer Bellows	LW	United States	U.S. NTDP (USHL)
4	95^{[a]}	Anatoly Golyshev	LW	Russia	Avtomobilist Yekaterinburg (KHL)
4	120^{[b]}	Otto Koivula	LW	Finland	Ilves (Liiga)
6	170	Collin Adams	LW	United States	Muskegon Lumberjacks (USHL)
7	193^{[c]}	Nick Pastujov	LW	United States	U.S. NTDP (USHL)
7	200	David Quenneville	D	Canada	Medicine Hat Tigers (WHL)

Draft notes

- The New York Islanders' second-round pick went to the Boston Bruins as the result of a trade on October 4, 2014, that sent Johnny Boychuk to New York in exchange for Philadelphia's second-round pick in 2015, a conditional third-round pick in 2015 and this pick.
- The New York Islanders' third-round pick went to the New Jersey Devils as the result of a trade on June 24, 2016, that sent a first-round pick in 2016 (11th overall) to Ottawa in exchange for a first-round pick in 2016 (12th overall) and this pick.

Ottawa previously acquired this pick as the result of a trade on February 29, 2016 that sent Shane Prince and a seventh-round pick in 2016 to New York in exchange for this pick (being conditional at the time of the trade). The condition – Ottawa will receive the lower of New York or Vancouver's third-round pick in 2016 – was converted on March 25, 2016 when the Canucks were eliminated from playoff contention ensuring that they would finish behind the Islanders in the overall league standings.

- ^{[a]} The Columbus Blue Jackets' fourth-round pick went to the New York Islanders as the result of a trade on June 25, 2016, that sent a fourth-round pick in 2016 (110th overall) and a sixth-round pick in 2017 to Chicago in exchange for this pick.

Chicago previously acquired this pick as the result of a trade on June 30, 2015 that sent Brandon Saad, Michael Paliotta and Alex Broadhurst to Columbus in exchange for Artem Anisimov, Jeremy Morin, Corey Tropp, Marko Dano and this pick.

- The New York Islanders' fourth-round pick went to Chicago Blackhawks as the result of a trade on June 25, 2016, that sent Columbus' fourth-round pick in 2016 (95th overall) to New York in exchange for a sixth-round pick in 2017 and this pick.
- ^{[b]} The San Jose Sharks' fourth-round pick went to the New York Islanders as the result of a trade on June 25, 2016, that sent a fourth-round pick in 2017 to Philadelphia in exchange for this pick.

Philadelphia previously acquired this pick as the result of a trade on June 27, 2015 that sent Nicklas Grossmann and Chris Pronger to Arizona in exchange for Sam Gagner and this pick (being conditional at the time of the trade). The condition – Philadelphia will receive a fourth-round pick in 2016 if Arizona acquires another fourth-round pick in 2016, at Arizona's choice – was converted on June 25, 2016.

Arizona previously acquired this pick as the result of a trade on June 20, 2016 that sent Maxim Letunov and a sixth-round pick in 2017 to San Jose in exchange for Detroit's third-round pick in 2017 and this pick.

- The New York Islanders' fifth-round pick went to the Vancouver Canucks as the result of a trade on May 25, 2016, that sent Jared McCann, a second and fourth-round pick both in 2016 to Florida in exchange for Erik Gudbranson and this pick.

Florida previously acquired this pick as the result of a trade on June 27, 2015 that sent Montreal's fifth-round pick in 2015 to New York in exchange for this pick.

- ^{[c]} The Ottawa Senators' seventh-round pick went to the New York Islanders as the result of a trade on February 29, 2016, that sent a conditional third-round pick in 2016 to Ottawa in exchange for Shane Prince and this pick.
