= 2016–17 Buffalo Sabres season =

NHL hockey team season

2016–17 Buffalo Sabres
- Division: 8th Atlantic
- Conference: 15th Eastern
- 2016–17 record: 33–37–12
- Home record: 20–15–6
- Road record: 13–22–6
- Goals for: 201
- Goals against: 237

Team information
- General manager: Tim Murray
- Coach: Dan Bylsma
- Captain: Brian Gionta
- Alternate captains: Josh Gorges; Ryan O'Reilly
- Arena: KeyBank Center
- Minor league affiliates: Rochester Americans (AHL); Elmira Jackals (ECHL)

Team leaders
- Goals: Evander Kane (28)
- Assists: Rasmus Ristolainen (39)
- Points: Jack Eichel (57)
- Penalty minutes: Evander Kane (113)
- Plus/minus: Taylor Fedun (+3)
- Wins: Robin Lehner (23)
- Goals against average: Anders Nilsson (2.67)

The 2016–17 Buffalo Sabres season was the 47th season for the National Hockey League (NHL) franchise that was established on May 22, 1970. Buffalo missed the playoffs for the sixth consecutive season.

== Off-season ==
The Sabres held their annual development camp during the second weekend of July. After the previous two seasons in which the Sabres held the tournament in the First Niagara Center, this edition was held at HarborCenter.

The Sabres reprised their hosting of a prospect tournament for 2016, after the success of the first event in 2015. The New Jersey Devils and Boston Bruins returned for the tournament, which ran September 16–19, partially opposite the 2016 World Cup of Hockey; in contrast to the previous season, the Sabres lost both prospect tournament games and finished in third place. The Sabres contributed three players to the World Cup: Jack Eichel for Team North America, Ryan O'Reilly for Canada, and Rasmus Ristolainen for Finland.

On July 16, 2016, the Sabres hired Tom Ward as an assistant coach. Ward had spent the previous 18 seasons as the head coach for the Minnesota High School boys prep team.

The Sabres also announced that the naming rights to their home arena will change. Due to First Niagara Financial Group, the arena's previous rights holder, being subsumed into KeyBank, the team's arena was renamed KeyBank Center for the 2016–17 season. The arena naming rights have passed through a succession of regional banks, having been known as First Niagara Center, HSBC Arena and Marine Midland Arena, through its 20-year history.

== Standings ==
Atlantic Division
Pos	Team	GP	W	L	OTL	ROW	GF	GA	GD	Pts
1	y – Montreal Canadiens	82	47	26	9	44	226	200	+26	103
2	x – Ottawa Senators	82	44	28	10	38	212	214	−2	98
3	x – Boston Bruins	82	44	31	7	42	234	212	+22	95
4	x – Toronto Maple Leafs	82	40	27	15	39	251	242	+9	95
5	Tampa Bay Lightning	82	42	30	10	38	234	227	+7	94
6	Florida Panthers	82	35	36	11	30	210	237	−27	81
7	Detroit Red Wings	82	33	36	13	24	207	244	−37	79
8	Buffalo Sabres	82	33	37	12	31	201	237	−36	78

Source: National Hockey League
x – Clinched playoff spot; y – Clinched division

Eastern Conference Wild Card
Pos	Div	Team	GP	W	L	OTL	ROW	GF	GA	GD	Pts
1	ME	x – New York Rangers	82	48	28	6	45	256	220	+36	102
2	AT	x – Toronto Maple Leafs	82	40	27	15	39	251	242	+9	95
3	ME	New York Islanders	82	41	29	12	39	241	242	−1	94
4	AT	Tampa Bay Lightning	82	42	30	10	38	234	227	+7	94
5	ME	Philadelphia Flyers	82	39	33	10	32	219	236	−17	88
6	ME	Carolina Hurricanes	82	36	31	15	33	215	236	−21	87
7	AT	Florida Panthers	82	35	36	11	30	210	237	−27	81
8	AT	Detroit Red Wings	82	33	36	13	24	207	244	−37	79
9	AT	Buffalo Sabres	82	33	37	12	31	201	237	−36	78
10	ME	New Jersey Devils	82	28	40	14	25	183	244	−61	70

Source: National Hockey League
x – Clinched playoff spot

== Schedule and results ==
=== Pre-season ===
2016 Pre-season Game Log: 4–2–1 (Home: 2–2–0; Road: 2–0–1)
#	Date	Visitor	Score	Home	OT	Decision	Attendance	Record	Recap
1	September 26	Minnesota	2–1	Buffalo		Ullmark	–	0–1–0	Recap
2	September 27	Ottawa	2–3	Buffalo	OT	Lehner	17,868	1–1–0	Recap
3	September 29	Buffalo	1–0	Toronto	SO	Nilsson	–	2–1–0	Recap
4	September 30	Toronto	8–1	Buffalo		Kasdorf	17,866	2-2-0	Recap
5	October 4	Carolina	0–2	Buffalo		Lehner	–	3–2–0	Recap
6	October 5	Buffalo	2–3	Carolina	SO	Ullmark	–	3–2–1	Recap
7	October 7	Buffalo	4–2	Ottawa		Lehner	14,216	4–2–1	Recap

=== Regular season ===
2016–17 Game Log

October: 3–3–2 (Home: 1–2–0; Road: 2–1–2)
#	Date	Visitor	Score	Home	OT	Decision	Attendance	Record	Pts	Recap
1	October 13	Montreal	4–1	Buffalo		Lehner	19,070	0–1–0	0	Recap
2	October 16	Buffalo	6–2	Edmonton		Lehner	18,347	1–1–0	2	Recap
3	October 18	Buffalo	3–4	Calgary	OT	Lehner	19,289	1–1–1	3	Recap
4	October 20	Buffalo	1–2	Vancouver		Lehner	17,809	1–2–1	3	Recap
5	October 25	Buffalo	3–4	Philadelphia	SO	Nilsson	19,209	1–2–2	4	Recap
6	October 27	Minnesota	4–0	Buffalo		Nilsson	18,122	1–3–2	4	Recap
7	October 29	Florida	0–3	Buffalo		Nilsson	18,261	2–3–2	6	Recap
8	October 30	Buffalo	3–1	Winnipeg		Lehner	15,294	3–3–2	8	Recap

November: 5–6–3 (Home: 2–2–3; Road: 3–4–0)
#	Date	Visitor	Score	Home	OT	Decision	Attendance	Record	Pts	Recap
9	November 1	Buffalo	2–1	Minnesota		Lehner	18,864	4–3–2	10	Recap
10	November 3	Toronto	2–1	Buffalo		Lehner	18,183	4–4–2	10	Recap
11	November 5	Buffalo	2–1	Ottawa		Lehner	16,225	5–4–2	12	Recap
12	November 7	Buffalo	0–4	Boston		Lehner	17,565	5–5–2	12	Recap
13	November 9	Ottawa	2–1	Buffalo	SO	Lehner	17,884	5–5–3	13	Recap
14	November 11	New Jersey	2–1	Buffalo	OT	Nilsson	18,301	5–5–4	14	Recap
15	November 12	Buffalo	2–4	New Jersey		Lehner	16,514	5–6–4	14	Recap
16	November 15	Buffalo	1–4	St. Louis		Lehner	16,884	5–7–4	14	Recap
17	November 17	Tampa Bay	4–1	Buffalo		Lehner	17,870	5–8–4	14	Recap
18	November 19	Pittsburgh	1–2	Buffalo	SO	Nilsson	18,817	6–8–4	16	Recap
19	November 21	Calgary	2–4	Buffalo		Lehner	17,526	7–8–4	18	Recap
20	November 23	Detroit	2–1	Buffalo	SO	Lehner	18,360	7–8–5	19	Recap
21	November 25	Buffalo	1–3	Washington		Nilsson	18,506	7–9–5	19	Recap
22	November 29	Buffalo	5–4	Ottawa		Nilsson	14,259	8–9–5	21	Recap

December: 5–6–3 (Home: 4–4–0; Road: 1–2–3)
#	Date	Visitor	Score	Home	OT	Decision	Attendance	Record	Pts	Recap
23	December 1	NY Rangers	3–4	Buffalo		Nilsson	18,047	9–9–5	23	Recap
24	December 3	Boston	2–1	Buffalo		Lehner	19,070	9–10–5	23	Recap
25	December 5	Buffalo	2–3	Washington	OT	Lehner	18,506	9–10–6	24	Recap
26	December 6	Edmonton	3–4	Buffalo	OT	Nilsson	18,149	10–10–6	26	Recap
27	December 9	Washington	4–1	Buffalo		Lehner	18,234	10–11–6	26	Recap
28	December 13	Los Angeles	3–6	Buffalo		Lehner	18,375	11–11–6	28	Recap
29	December 16	NY Islanders	2–3	Buffalo	OT	Lehner	18,903	12–11–6	30	Recap
30	December 17	Buffalo	1–2	Carolina	SO	Nilsson	11,682	12–11–7	31	Recap
31	December 20	Buffalo	3–4	Florida	SO	Lehner	14,265	12–11–8	32	Recap
32	December 22	Carolina	3–1	Buffalo		Lehner	18,863	12–12–8	32	Recap
33	December 23	Buffalo	1–5	NY Islanders		Nilsson	13,852	12–13–8	32	Recap
34	December 27	Buffalo	4–3	Detroit		Lehner	20,027	13–13–8	34	Recap
35	December 29	Boston	4–2	Buffalo		Lehner	19,070	13–14–8	34	Recap
36	December 31	Buffalo	1–3	Boston		Lehner	17,565	13–15–8	34	Recap

January: 7–5–1 (Home: 4–0–0; Road: 3–5–1)
#	Date	Visitor	Score	Home	OT	Decision	Attendance	Record	Pts	Recap
37	January 3	Buffalo	4–1	NY Rangers		Nilsson	18,006	14–15–8	36	Recap
38	January 5	Buffalo	3–4	Chicago	OT	Nilsson	21,824	14–15–9	37	Recap
39	January 7	Winnipeg	3–4	Buffalo		Lehner	19,070	15–15–9	39	Recap
40	January 10	Philadelphia	1–4	Buffalo		Nilsson	18,920	16–15–9	41	Recap
41	January 12	Buffalo	2–4	Tampa Bay		Nilsson	19,092	16–16–9	41	Recap
42	January 13	Buffalo	2–5	Carolina		Nilsson	11,992	16–17–9	41	Recap
43	January 16	Dallas	1–4	Buffalo		Lehner	19,070	17–17–9	43	Recap
44	January 17	Buffalo	3–4	Toronto		Nilsson	19,122	17–18–9	43	Recap
45	January 20	Detroit	2–3	Buffalo	OT	Nilsson	18,842	18–18–9	45	Recap
46	January 21	Buffalo	3–2	Montreal	OT	Lehner	21,288	19–18–9	47	Recap
47	January 24	Buffalo	5–4	Nashville	OT	Lehner	17,113	20–18–9	49	Recap
48	January 26	Buffalo	3–4	Dallas		Nilsson	17,856	20–19–9	49	Recap
January 27–29		All-Star Break in Los Angeles
49	January 31	Buffalo	2–5	Montreal		Lehner	21,288	20–20–9	49	Recap

February: 6–6–2 (Home: 4–3–2; Road: 2–3–0)
#	Date	Visitor	Score	Home	OT	Decision	Attendance	Record	Pts	Recap
50	February 2	NY Rangers	2–1	Buffalo	OT	Lehner	18,941	20–20–10	50	Recap
51	February 4	Ottawa	0–4	Buffalo		Lehner	19,070	21–20–10	52	Recap
52	February 6	Buffalo	1–2	New Jersey		Lehner	12,105	21–21–10	52	Recap
53	February 7	San Jose	4–5	Buffalo	OT	Nilsson	18,462	22–21–10	54	Recap
54	February 9	Anaheim	5–2	Buffalo		Lehner	18,027	22–22–10	54	Recap
55	February 11	Buffalo	3–1	Toronto		Lehner	19,427	23–22–10	56	Recap
56	February 12	Vancouver	4–2	Buffalo		Lehner	18,876	23–23–10	56	Recap
57	February 14	Buffalo	3–2	Ottawa		Lehner	16,832	24–23–10	58	Recap
58	February 16	Colorado	0–2	Buffalo		Lehner	18,335	25–23–10	60	Recap
59	February 18	St. Louis	2–3	Buffalo		Lehner	19,070	26–23–10	62	Recap
60	February 19	Chicago	5–1	Buffalo		Lehner	19,070	26–24–10	62	Recap
61	February 25	Buffalo	3–5	Colorado		Lehner	15,362	26–25–10	62	Recap
62	February 26	Buffalo	2–3	Arizona		Nilsson	13,432	26–26–10	62	Recap
63	February 28	Nashville	5–4	Buffalo	OT	Lehner	18,634	26–26–11	63	Recap

March: 6–7–1 (Home: 4–2–1; Road: 3–4–0)
#	Date	Visitor	Score	Home	OT	Decision	Attendance	Record	Pts	Recap
64	March 2	Arizona	3–6	Buffalo		Lehner	18,116	27–26–11	65	Recap
65	March 4	Tampa Bay	2–1	Buffalo	SO	Lehner	18,935	27–26–12	66	Recap
66	March 5	Buffalo	3–4	Pittsburgh		Nilsson	18,653	27–27–12	66	Recap
67	March 7	Philadelphia	6–3	Buffalo		Lehner	18,233	27–28–12	66	Recap
68	March 10	Buffalo	3–4	Columbus		Lehner	17,530	27–29–12	66	Recap
69	March 11	Columbus	3–5	Buffalo		Nilsson	18,744	28–29–12	68	Recap
70	March 14	Buffalo	1–4	San Jose		Lehner	17,386	28–30–12	68	Recap
71	March 16	Buffalo	0–2	Los Angeles		Lehner	18,230	28–31–12	68	Recap
72	March 17	Buffalo	2–1	Anaheim	SO	Nilsson	14,556	29–31–12	70	Recap
73	March 20	Buffalo	2–1	Detroit		Lehner	20,027	30–31–12	72	Recap
74	March 21	Pittsburgh	3–1	Buffalo		Lehner	18,313	30–32–12	72	Recap
75	March 25	Toronto	2–5	Buffalo		Lehner	19,070	31–32–12	74	Recap
76	March 27	Florida	2–4	Buffalo		Lehner	18,564	32–32–12	76	Recap
77	March 28	Buffalo	1–3	Columbus		Nilsson	14,533	32–33–12	76	Recap

April: 1–4–0 (Home: 1–2–0; Road: 0–2–0)
#	Date	Visitor	Score	Home	OT	Decision	Attendance	Record	Pts	Recap
78	April 2	NY Islanders	4–2	Buffalo		Lehner	19,070	32–34–12	76	Recap
79	April 3	Toronto	4–2	Buffalo		Lehner	18,829	32–35–12	76	Recap
80	April 5	Montreal	1–2	Buffalo		Lehner	18,815	33–35–12	78	Recap
81	April 8	Buffalo	0–3	Florida		Lehner	17,235	33–36–12	78	Recap
82	April 9	Buffalo	2–4	Tampa Bay		Ullmark	19,092	33–37–12	78	Recap

Legend: Win (2 points) Loss (0 points) Overtime/shootout loss (1 point)

== Player stats ==
As of April 9, 2017

=== Skaters ===
Regular season
Player	GP	G	A	Pts	+/−	PIM
Jack Eichel	61	24	33	57	−13	22
Ryan O'Reilly	72	20	35	55	−1	10
Sam Reinhart	79	17	30	47	−11	8
Kyle Okposo	65	19	26	45	−7	24
Rasmus Ristolainen	79	6	39	45	−9	58
Evander Kane	70	28	15	43	−17	113
Brian Gionta	82	15	20	35	−11	22
Matt Moulson	81	14	18	32	−4	10
Marcus Foligno	80	13	10	23	−1	73
Jake McCabe	76	3	17	20	−7	26
Cody Franson	68	3	16	19	−5	34
Zemgus Girgensons	75	7	9	16	−7	18
Tyler Ennis	51	5	8	13	−10	12
Johan Larsson	36	6	5	11	−7	20
Zach Bogosian	56	2	9	11	−17	46
William Carrier	41	5	3	8	−1	21
Justin Falk	52	0	8	8	−3	29
Taylor Fedun	27	0	7	7	3	16
Evan Rodrigues	30	4	2	6	−7	4
Josh Gorges	66	1	5	6	−3	50
Dmitry Kulikov	47	2	3	5	−26	26
Nicholas Baptiste	14	3	1	4	1	6
Justin Bailey	32	2	2	4	0	4
Derek Grant^{‡†}	40	0	3	3	−3	19
Nicolas Deslauriers	42	0	2	2	−6	38
Hudson Fasching	10	0	1	1	−1	2
Alexander Nylander	4	0	1	1	−2	0
Cal O'Reilly	11	0	1	1	−6	0
Cole Schneider	4	0	1	1	2	0
C. J. Smith	2	0	1	1	−1	0
Brady Austin	5	0	0	0	0	4
Erik Burgdoerfer	2	0	0	0	−1	0
Brendan Guhle	3	0	0	0	1	0
Sean Malone	1	0	0	0	0	0
Casey Nelson	11	0	0	0	−3	4

=== Goaltenders ===
Regular season
Player	GP	GS	TOI	W	L	OT	GA	GAA	SA	SV%	SO	G	A	PIM
Robin Lehner	59	58	3405:28	23	26	8	152	2.68	1,910	.920	2	0	1	6
Anders Nilsson	26	23	1484:15	10	10	4	66	2.67	857	.923	1	0	0	0
Linus Ullmark	1	1	58:44	0	1	0	3	3.05	36	.917	0	0	0	0

^{†}Denotes player spent time with another team before joining the Sabres. Stats reflect time with the Sabres only.
^{‡}Denotes player was traded mid-season. Stats reflect time with the Sabres only.
Bold/italics denotes franchise record.

== Transactions ==
The Sabres have been involved in the following transactions during the 2016–17 season:

=== Trades ===
Date	Details		Ref
June 25, 2016	To Florida Panthers Mark Pysyk; 2nd-round pick in 2016; STL's 3rd-round pick in 2016	To Buffalo Sabres Dmitry Kulikov; VAN's 2nd-round pick in 2016
July 2, 2016	To St. Louis Blues 5th-round pick in 2017	To Buffalo Sabres Anders Nilsson
February 28, 2017	To New York Rangers Daniel Catenacci	To Buffalo Sabres Mat Bodie

=== Free agents acquired ===
Date	Player	Former team	Contract terms (in U.S. dollars)	Ref
July 1, 2016	Kyle Okposo	New York Islanders	7 years, $42 million contract	
July 1, 2016	Taylor Fedun	Utica Comets	1 year, $600,000 two-way contract	
July 1, 2016	Justin Falk	Columbus Blue Jackets	1 year, $650,000, two-way contract	
July 2, 2016	Derek Grant	Stockton Heat	1 year, $650,000, two-way contract	
July 21, 2016	Erik Burgdoerfer	Hershey Bears	1 year, $575,000 two-way contract	
March 30, 2017	C. J. Smith	UMass Lowell	2 years, $1.85 million entry-level contract	
May 25, 2017	Victor Antipin	Metallurg Magnitogorsk	1 year, $1.775 million entry-level contract	

=== Free agents lost ===
Date	Player	New team	Contract terms (in U.S. dollars)	Ref
July 1, 2016	Chad Johnson	Calgary Flames	1 year, $1.7 million	
July 1, 2016	Chad Ruhwedel	Pittsburgh Penguins	1 year, $575,000	
July 1, 2016	Tim Schaller	Boston Bruins	1 year, $600,000	
July 19, 2016	Nathan Lieuwen	San Antonio Rampage	1 year, amount undisclosed	

=== Claimed via waivers ===
Player	Previous team	Date claimed off waivers	Ref
Derek Grant	Nashville Predators	February 6, 2017	

=== Lost via waivers ===
Player	New team	Date claimed off waivers	Ref
Derek Grant	Nashville Predators	January 11, 2017	

=== Lost via retirement ===
Player	Ref
Matt Ellis	

=== Players released ===
Date	Player	Via	Ref

=== Player signings ===
Date	Player	Contract terms (in U.S. dollars)	Ref
June 29, 2016	Casey Nelson	2 years, $1.3 million	
June 30, 2016	Jake McCabe	3 years, $4.8 million	
June 30, 2016	Cole Schneider	1 year, $600,000	
July 14, 2016	Marcus Foligno	1 year, $2.25 million	
July 15, 2016	Alexander Nylander	3 years, entry-level contract	
July 16, 2016	Dan Catenacci	1 year, $575,000, two-way contract	
July 17, 2016	Jason Kasdorf	2 years, $1.15 million, two-way contract	
September 1, 2016	Zemgus Girgensons	1 year, $1.15 million	
October 11, 2016	Rasmus Ristolainen	6 years, $32.4 million	
February 6, 2017	Justin Falk	1 year, $650,000 contract extension	
April 8, 2017	Sean Malone	2 years, $1.85 million entry-level contract	
April 26, 2017	Devante Stephens	3 years, $2.3 million entry-level contract	
May 31, 2017	Jonas Johansson	3 years, $2.775 million entry-level contract	
June 13, 2017	Linus Ullmark	2 years, $1.5 million	

== Draft picks ==
Below are the Buffalo Sabres' selections at the 2016 NHL entry draft, held on June 24–25, 2016 at the First Niagara Center in Buffalo, New York.

Round	#	Player	Pos	Nationality	College/Junior/Club team (League)
1	8	Alexander Nylander	LW	Sweden	Mississauga Steelheads (OHL)
2	33^{[a]}	Rasmus Asplund	C	Sweden	Farjestad BK (SHL)
3	69	Cliff Pu	C	Canada	London Knights (OHL)
3	86^{[b]}	Casey Fitzgerald	D	United States	Boston College Eagles (HE)
4	99	Brett Murray	LW	Canada	Carleton Place Canadians (CCHL)
5	129	Philip Nyberg	D	Sweden	Linköpings HC (SHL)
5	130^{[c]}	Vojtech Budik	D	Czech Republic	Prince Albert Raiders (WHL)
6	159	Brandon Hagel	LW	Canada	Red Deer Rebels (WHL)
7	189	Austin Osmanski	D	United States	Mississauga Steelheads (OHL)
7	190^{[d]}	Vasily Glotov	C	Russia	Lvy St. Petersburg (MHL)

Notes

- ^{[a]} The Vancouver Canucks' second-round pick went to the Buffalo Sabres as the result of a trade on June 25, 2016 that sent Mark Pysyk, a second-round pick and St. Louis' third-round pick both in 2016 (38th and 89th overall) to Florida in exchange for Dmitry Kulikov and this pick.

Florida previously acquired this pick as the result of a trade on May 25, 2016 that sent Erik Gudbranson and the Islanders fifth-round pick in 2016 to Vancouver in exchange for Jared McCann, a fourth-round pick in 2016 and this pick.

- The Buffalo Sabres' second-round pick went to the Florida Panthers as the result of a trade on June 25, 2016 that sent Dmitri Kulikov and Vancouver's second-round pick in 2016 (33rd overall) to Buffalo in exchange for Mark Pysyk, St. Louis' third-round pick in 2016 (89th overall) and this pick.
- ^{[b]} The Dallas Stars' third-round pick went to the Buffalo Sabres as the result of a trade on February 11, 2015 that sent Jhonas Enroth to Dallas in exchange for Anders Lindback and this pick (being conditional at the time of the trade). The condition – Buffalo will receive a third-round pick in 2016 if Enroth wins fewer than four playoff games for the Stars in 2015 – was converted on April 6, 2015 when the Stars were eliminated from playoff contention.
- ^{[c]} The Montreal Canadiens' fifth-round pick will go to the Buffalo Sabres as the result of a trade on March 2, 2015 that sent Brian Flynn to Montreal in exchange for this pick.
- ^{[d]} The Montreal Canadiens' seventh-round pick went to the Buffalo Sabres as the result of a trade on March 2, 2015 that sent Torrey Mitchell to Montreal in exchange for Jack Nevins and this pick.
