= 2016–17 Toronto Maple Leafs season =

National Hockey League team season

2016–17 Toronto Maple Leafs
- Division: 4th Atlantic
- Conference: 8th Eastern
- 2016–17 record: 40–27–15
- Home record: 21–13–7
- Road record: 19–14–8
- Goals for: 251
- Goals against: 242

Team information
- General manager: Lou Lamoriello
- Coach: Mike Babcock
- Captain: Vacant
- Alternate captains: Tyler Bozak; Matt Hunwick; Leo Komarov; Morgan Rielly
- Arena: Air Canada Centre
- Average attendance: 19,764 (105.1%)
- Minor league affiliates: Toronto Marlies (AHL); Orlando Solar Bears (ECHL)

Team leaders
- Goals: Auston Matthews (40)
- Assists: Mitch Marner (42)
- Points: Auston Matthews (69)
- Penalty minutes: Matt Martin (123)
- Plus/minus: Jake Gardiner (+24)
- Wins: Frederik Andersen (33)
- Goals against average: Frederik Andersen (2.67)

The 2016–17 Toronto Maple Leafs season was the 100th season for the National Hockey League (NHL) franchise that was established on November 22, 1917. The Maple Leafs finished the season with 95 points (their highest in 12 years) and qualified for the playoffs for the first time since the 2012–13 season. The Leafs lost two games to four in the first round against the Washington Capitals.

== Off-season ==
The off-season was relatively quiet for the Maple Leafs relative to previous seasons. On July 1, the opening day of free agency, Toronto signed forward Matt Martin to a four-year, $10 million contract, then brought back defenceman Roman Polak on a one-year deal the following day. Justin Holl, who had played with the Marlies the previous season, also signed a one-year deal. At the end of July, forward Trevor Moore from the University of Denver signed a three-year, entry-level contract after impressing the organization during rookie training camp a few weeks earlier, which Moore had been personally invited to. No more moves were made until nearly a month later when, on August 22, Jhonas Enroth was signed to a one-year deal to backup newly acquired goaltender Frederik Andersen. Mark Hunter was also promoted to an assistant general manager, while Brandon Prust and Raman Hrabarenka were signed to professional try outs.

== Standings ==
Atlantic Division
Pos	Team	GP	W	L	OTL	ROW	GF	GA	GD	Pts
1	y – Montreal Canadiens	82	47	26	9	44	226	200	+26	103
2	x – Ottawa Senators	82	44	28	10	38	212	214	−2	98
3	x – Boston Bruins	82	44	31	7	42	234	212	+22	95
4	x – Toronto Maple Leafs	82	40	27	15	39	251	242	+9	95
5	Tampa Bay Lightning	82	42	30	10	38	234	227	+7	94
6	Florida Panthers	82	35	36	11	30	210	237	−27	81
7	Detroit Red Wings	82	33	36	13	24	207	244	−37	79
8	Buffalo Sabres	82	33	37	12	31	201	237	−36	78

Source: National Hockey League
x – Clinched playoff spot; y – Clinched division

Eastern Conference Wild Card
Pos	Div	Team	GP	W	L	OTL	ROW	GF	GA	GD	Pts
1	ME	x – New York Rangers	82	48	28	6	45	256	220	+36	102
2	AT	x – Toronto Maple Leafs	82	40	27	15	39	251	242	+9	95
3	ME	New York Islanders	82	41	29	12	39	241	242	−1	94
4	AT	Tampa Bay Lightning	82	42	30	10	38	234	227	+7	94
5	ME	Philadelphia Flyers	82	39	33	10	32	219	236	−17	88
6	ME	Carolina Hurricanes	82	36	31	15	33	215	236	−21	87
7	AT	Florida Panthers	82	35	36	11	30	210	237	−27	81
8	AT	Detroit Red Wings	82	33	36	13	24	207	244	−37	79
9	AT	Buffalo Sabres	82	33	37	12	31	201	237	−36	78
10	ME	New Jersey Devils	82	28	40	14	25	183	244	−61	70

Source: National Hockey League
x – Clinched playoff spot

== Record vs opponents ==
Eastern Conference												Western Conference					
Atlantic Division							Metropolitan Division					Central Division			Pacific Division		
Team	Home			Road			Team	Home		Road		Team	Home	Road	Team	Home	Road
Boston	4–1	4–2		4–1	6–5		Carolina	1–2		4–0	3–2^{OT}	Chicago	1–2^{OT}	4–5^{SO}	Anaheim	2–3	2–5
Buffalo	4–3	1–3		2–1	2–5	4–2	Columbus	2–3		2–5	5–2	Colorado	1–3	6–0	Arizona	2–3^{SO}	4–1
Detroit	5–4^{OT}	3–2		4–0	5–4		New Jersey	4–2		4–5^{SO}	4–2	Dallas	3–1	3–6	Calgary	4–0	0–3
Florida	3–2	6–1	3–2	3–2^{SO}	2–7		N.Y. Islanders	7–1		1–5	5–6^{OT}	Minnesota	2–3	2–3	Edmonton	3–2^{OT}	4–2
Montreal	3–5	2–3^{OT}		1–2	1–2		N.Y. Rangers	2–5	1–2^{SO}	4–2		Nashville	6–2	3–1	Los Angeles	0–7	2–3^{SO}
Ottawa	2–3^{SO}	3–6		4–5^{OT}	4–2		Philadelphia	6–3	4–2	1–2		St. Louis	1–2^{OT}	1–5	San Jose	2–3^{SO}	1–3
Tampa Bay	3–7	1–4		3–2^{OT}	5–0		Pittsburgh	2–1^{OT}	5–3	1–4		Winnipeg	5–4^{OT}	4–5^{OT}	Vancouver	6–3	2–3^{SO}
							Washington	4–2	1–4	5–6^{OT}							
Records	8–5–2			10–4–1				7–4–1		5–4–3			3–2–2	2–3–2		3–2–2	2–3–2
Division	18–9–3							12–8–4					5–5–4			5–5–4	
Conference	30–17–7 (Home: 15–9–3; Away: 15–8–4)												10–10–8 (Home: 6–4–4; Away: 4–6–4)				
Overall	40–27–15 (Home: 21–13–7; Away: 19–14–8)																

=== Notes ===
^{OT} Game decided in overtime
^{SO} Game decided in a shootout

== Schedule and results ==
=== Pre-season ===
2016 Pre-season Game Log: 2–4–2 (Home: 1–2–1; Road: 1–2–1)
#	Date	Visitor	Score	Home	OT	Decision	Attendance	Record	Recap
1	September 26	Ottawa	6–3	Toronto		–	–	0–1–0	Recap
2	September 29	Buffalo	1–0	Toronto	SO	–	–	0–1–1	Recap
3	September 30	Toronto	8–1	Buffalo		Enroth	17,866	1–1–1	Recap
4	October 2	Montreal	2–3	Toronto	OT	Sparks	18,912	2–1–1	Recap
5	October 4	Toronto	2–3	Ottawa	OT	–	–	2–1–2	Recap
6	October 6	Toronto	1–6	Montreal		Andersen	21,288	2–2–2	Recap
7	October 7	Detroit	2–1	Toronto		–	–	2–3–2	Recap
8	October 8	Toronto	3–4	Detroit		Andersen	20,027	2–4–2	Recap

=== Regular season ===
2016–17 Game Log: 40–27–15, 95 points (Home: 21–13–7; Road: 19–14–8)

October: 2–4–3, 7 points (Home: 2–1–0; Road: 0–3–3)
#	Date	Visitor	Score	Home	OT	Decision	Attendance	Record	Pts	Recap
1	October 12	Toronto	4–5	Ottawa	OT	Andersen (0–0–1)	17,618	0–0–1	1	Recap
2	October 15	Boston	1–4	Toronto		Andersen (1–0–1)	19,466	1–0–1	3	Recap
3	October 19	Toronto	4–5	Winnipeg	OT	Andersen (1–0–2)	15,294	1–0–2	4	Recap
4	October 20	Toronto	2–3	Minnesota		Enroth (0–1–0)	18,968	1–1–2	4	Recap
5	October 22	Toronto	4–5	Chicago	SO	Andersen (1–0–3)	21,735	1–1–3	5	Recap
6	October 25	Tampa Bay	7–3	Toronto		Andersen (1–1–3)	19,449	1–2–3	5	Recap
7	October 27	Florida	2–3	Toronto		Andersen (2–1–3)	18,979	2–2–3	7	Recap
8	October 29	Toronto	1–2	Montreal		Andersen (2–2–3)	21,288	2–3–3	7	Recap
9	October 30	Toronto	1–5	NY Islanders		Enroth (0–2–0)	12,057	2–4–3	7	Recap

November: 8–5–1, 17 points (Home: 6–2–0; Road: 2–3–1)
#	Date	Visitor	Score	Home	OT	Decision	Attendance	Record	Pts	Recap
10	November 1	Edmonton	2–3	Toronto	OT	Andersen (3–2–3)	19,687	3–4–3	9	Recap
11	November 3	Toronto	2–1	Buffalo		Andersen (4–2–3)	18,183	4–4–3	11	Recap
12	November 5	Vancouver	3–6	Toronto		Andersen (5–2–3)	19,480	5–4–3	13	Recap
13	November 8	Los Angeles	7–0	Toronto		Andersen (5–3–3)	18,976	5–5–3	13	Recap
14	November 11	Philadelphia	3–6	Toronto		Andersen (6–3–3)	19,189	6–5–3	15	Recap
15	November 12	Toronto	1–4	Pittsburgh		Andersen (6–4–3)	18,668	6–6–3	15	Recap
16	November 15	Nashville	2–6	Toronto		Andersen (7–4–3)	19,342	7–6–3	17	Recap
17	November 17	Florida	1–6	Toronto		Andersen (8–4–3)	18,931	8–6–3	19	Recap
18	November 19	Toronto	1–2	Montreal		Andersen (8–5–3)	21,288	8–7–3	19	Recap
19	November 22	Carolina	2–1	Toronto		Andersen (8–6–3)	18,893	8–8–3	19	Recap
20	November 23	Toronto	4–5	New Jersey	SO	Enroth (0–2–1)	13,752	8–8–4	20	Recap
21	November 26	Washington	2–4	Toronto		Andersen (9–6–3)	19,051	9–8–4	22	Recap
22	November 29	Toronto	4–2	Edmonton		Andersen (10–6–3)	18,347	10–8–4	24	Recap
23	November 30	Toronto	0–3	Calgary		Enroth (0–3–1)	19,289	10–9–4	24	Recap

December: 6–3–3, 15 points (Home: 1–3–2; Road: 5–0–1)
#	Date	Visitor	Score	Home	OT	Decision	Attendance	Record	Pts	Recap
24	December 3	Toronto	2–3	Vancouver	SO	Andersen (10–6–4)	18,865	10–9–5	25	Recap
25	December 7	Minnesota	3–2	Toronto		Andersen (10–7–4)	18,944	10–10–5	25	Recap
26	December 10	Toronto	4–1	Boston		Andersen (11–7–4)	17,565	11–10–5	27	Recap
27	December 11	Colorado	3–1	Toronto		Bibeau (0–1–0)	18,875	11–11–5	27	Recap
28	December 13	San Jose	3–2	Toronto	SO	Andersen (11–7–5)	19,380	11–11–6	28	Recap
29	December 15	Arizona	3–2	Toronto	SO	Andersen (11–7–6)	18,903	11–11–7	29	Recap
30	December 17	Pittsburgh	1–2	Toronto	OT	Andersen (12–7–6)	19,553	12–11–7	31	Recap
31	December 19	Anaheim	3–2	Toronto		Andersen (12–8–6)	18,861	12–12–7	31	Recap
32	December 22	Toronto	6–0	Colorado		Andersen (13–8–6)	15,502	13–12–7	33	Recap
33	December 23	Toronto	4–1	Arizona		Andersen (14–8–6)	14,377	14–12–7	35	Recap
34	December 28	Toronto	3–2	Florida	SO	Andersen (15–8–6)	16,965	15–12–7	37	Recap
35	December 29	Toronto	3–2	Tampa Bay	OT	Bibeau (1–1–0)	19,092	16–12–7	39	Recap

January: 7–4–2, 16 points (Home: 3–2–1; Road: 4–2–1)
#	Date	Visitor	Score	Home	OT	Decision	Attendance	Record	Pts	Recap
36	January 1	Detroit	4–5	Toronto	OT	Andersen (16–8–6)	40,148 (outdoors)	17–12–7	41	Recap
37	January 3	Toronto	5–6	Washington	OT	Andersen (16–8–7)	18,506	17–12–8	42	Recap
38	January 6	Toronto	4–2	New Jersey		Andersen (17–8–7)	15,233	18–12–8	44	Recap
39	January 7	Montreal	5–3	Toronto		Andersen (17–9–7)	19,796	18–13–8	44	Recap
–	January 8–12	five-day bye period
40	January 13	Toronto	4–2	NY Rangers		Andersen (18–9–7)	18,006	19–13–8	46	Recap
41	January 14	Toronto	4–2	Ottawa		McElhinney (1–0–0)	19,782	20–13–8	48	Recap
42	January 17	Buffalo	3–4	Toronto		Andersen (19–9–7)	19,122	21–13–8	50	Recap
43	January 19	NY Rangers	5–2	Toronto		Andersen (19–10–7)	19,088	21–14–8	50	Recap
44	January 21	Ottawa	3–2	Toronto	SO	Andersen (19–10–8)	19,544	21–14–9	51	Recap
45	January 23	Calgary	0–4	Toronto		Andersen (20–10–8)	19,043	22–14–9	53	Recap
46	January 25	Toronto	4–0	Detroit		Andersen (21–10–8)	20,027	23–14–9	55	Recap
47	January 26	Toronto	1–2	Philadelphia		McElhinney (1–1–0)	19,723	23–15–9	55	Recap
–	January 27–29	All-Star Break in Los Angeles
48	January 31	Toronto	3–6	Dallas		McElhinney (1–2–0)	17,547	23–16–9	55	Recap

February: 5–5–4, 14 points (Home: 3–2–3; Road: 2–3–1)
#	Date	Visitor	Score	Home	OT	Decision	Attendance	Record	Pts	Recap
49	February 2	Toronto	1–5	St. Louis		Andersen (21–11–8)	19,258	23–17–9	55	Recap
50	February 4	Toronto	6–5	Boston		Andersen (22–11–8)	17,565	24–17–9	57	Recap
51	February 6	Toronto	5–6	NY Islanders	OT	Andersen (22–11–9)	11,828	24–17–10	58	Recap
52	February 7	Dallas	1–3	Toronto		McElhinney (2–2–0)	19,233	25–17–10	60	Recap
53	February 9	St. Louis	2–1	Toronto	OT	Andersen (22–11–10)	18,920	25–17–11	61	Recap
54	February 11	Buffalo	3–1	Toronto		Andersen (22–12–10)	19,427	25–18–11	61	Recap
55	February 14	NY Islanders	1–7	Toronto		Andersen (23–12–10)	18,956	26–18–11	63	Recap
56	February 15	Toronto	2–5	Columbus		McElhinney (2–3–0)	14,548	26–19–11	63	Recap
57	February 18	Ottawa	6–3	Toronto		Andersen (23–13–10)	19,527	26–20–11	63	Recap
58	February 19	Toronto	4–0	Carolina		McElhinney (3–3–0)	10,004	27–20–11	65	Recap
59	February 21	Winnipeg	4–5	Toronto	OT	Andersen (24–13–10)	19,583	28–20–11	67	Recap
60	February 23	NY Rangers	2–1	Toronto	SO	Andersen (24–13–11)	19,175	28–20–12	68	Recap
61	February 25	Montreal	3–2	Toronto	OT	Andersen (24–13–12)	19,843	28–20–13	69	Recap
62	February 28	Toronto	1–3	San Jose		Andersen (24–14–12)	17,515	28–21–13	69	Recap

March: 9–3–2, 20 points (Home: 5–0–1; Road: 4–3–1)
#	Date	Visitor	Score	Home	OT	Decision	Attendance	Record	Pts	Recap
63	March 2	Toronto	2–3	Los Angeles	SO	Andersen (24–14–13)	18,230	28–21–14	70	Recap
64	March 3	Toronto	2–5	Anaheim		McElhinney (3–4–0)	16,293	28–22–14	70	Recap
65	March 7	Detroit	2–3	Toronto		Andersen (25–14–13)	19,060	29–22–14	72	Recap
66	March 9	Philadelphia	2–4	Toronto		Andersen (26–14–13)	18,894	30–22–14	74	Recap
67	March 11	Toronto	3–2	Carolina	OT	Andersen (27–14–13)	12,328	31–22–14	76	Recap
68	March 14	Toronto	2–7	Florida		Andersen (27–15–13)	17,552	31–23–14	76	Recap
69	March 16	Toronto	5–0	Tampa Bay		Andersen (28–15–13)	19,092	32–23–14	78	Recap
70	March 18	Chicago	2–1	Toronto	OT	Andersen (28–15–14)	19,505	32–23–15	79	Recap
71	March 20	Boston	2–4	Toronto		Andersen (29–15–14)	19,347	33–23–15	81	Recap
72	March 22	Toronto	5–2	Columbus		Andersen (30–15–14)	16,106	34–23–15	83	Recap
73	March 23	New Jersey	2–4	Toronto		McElhinney (4–4–0)	19,142	35–23–15	85	Recap
74	March 25	Toronto	2–5	Buffalo		McElhinney (4–5–0)	19,070	35–24–15	85	Recap
75	March 28	Florida	2–3	Toronto		McElhinney (5–5–0)	19,278	36–24–15	87	Recap
76	March 30	Toronto	3–1	Nashville		Andersen (31–15–14)	17,214	37–24–15	89	Recap

April: 3–3–0, 6 points (Home: 1–3–0; Road: 2–0–0)
#	Date	Visitor	Score	Home	OT	Decision	Attendance	Record	Pts	Recap
77	April 1	Toronto	5–4	Detroit		Andersen (32–15–14)	20,027	38–24–15	91	Recap
78	April 3	Toronto	4–2	Buffalo		Andersen (33–15–14)	18,829	39–24–15	93	Recap
79	April 4	Washington	4–1	Toronto		McElhinney (5–6–0)	19,415	39–25–15	93	Recap
80	April 6	Tampa Bay	4–1	Toronto		Andersen (33–16–14)	19,380	39–26–15	93	Recap
81	April 8	Pittsburgh	3–5	Toronto		McElhinney (6–6–0)	19,561	40–26–15	95	Recap
82	April 9	Columbus	3–2	Toronto		McElhinney (6–7–0)	19,369	40–27–15	95	Recap

Legend: Win (2 points) Loss (0 points) Overtime/shootout loss (1 point)

== Playoffs ==
The Maple Leafs clinched a playoff spot for the first time since the 2012–13 season. They qualified as the second wildcard team in the Eastern Conference and faced the Washington Capitals, the division winner with the best record, in the first round. Washington won the series in 6 games, 4–2. This was the third playoff series in NHL history where five games were decided in overtime, the first occurring in the 1951 Stanley Cup Finals between the Toronto Maple Leafs and the Montreal Canadiens, and the second in the 2012 Western Conference Quarterfinals between the Phoenix Coyotes and the Chicago Blackhawks.

2017 Stanley Cup Playoffs

Eastern Conference First Round vs. (M1) Washington Capitals: Washington wins 4–2
#	Date	Visitor	Score	Home	OT	Decision	Attendance	Series	Recap
1	April 13	Toronto	2–3	Washington	OT	Andersen (0–1)	18,506	0–1	Recap
2	April 15	Toronto	4–3	Washington	2OT	Andersen (1–1)	18,506	1–1	Recap
3	April 17	Washington	3–4	Toronto	OT	Andersen (2–1)	19,861	2–1	Recap
4	April 19	Washington	5–4	Toronto		Andersen (2–2)	19,838	2–2	Recap
5	April 21	Toronto	1–2	Washington	OT	Andersen (2–3)	18,506	2–3	Recap
6	April 23	Washington	2–1	Toronto	OT	Andersen (2–4)	19,740	2–4	Recap

Legend: Win Loss

== Player statistics ==
Final stats

=== Skaters ===
Regular season
Player	GP	G	A	Pts	+/−	PIM
Auston Matthews	82	40	29	69	2	14
James van Riemsdyk	82	29	33	62	−2	37
Nazem Kadri	82	32	29	61	−7	95
William Nylander	81	22	39	61	−3	32
Mitch Marner	77	19	42	61	0	38
Tyler Bozak	78	18	37	55	−1	30
Jake Gardiner	82	9	34	43	24	34
Connor Brown	82	20	16	36	3	10
Nikita Zaitsev	82	4	32	36	−22	38
Leo Komarov	82	14	18	32	6	31
Zach Hyman	82	10	18	28	2	30
Morgan Rielly	76	6	21	27	−20	21
Matt Hunwick	72	1	18	19	8	18
Roman Polak	75	4	7	11	10	65
Josh Leivo	13	2	8	10	2	4
Matt Martin	82	5	4	9	0	123
Nikita Soshnikov	56	5	4	9	1	16
Connor Carrick	67	2	6	8	8	51
Martin Marincin	25	1	6	7	3	16
Ben Smith	36	2	2	4	−5	4
Frederik Gauthier	21	2	1	3	2	23
Brian Boyle^{†}	21	0	3	3	−2	18
Milan Michalek	5	1	1	2	−2	2
Alexey Marchenko^{†}	11	1	1	2	1	0
Kasperi Kapanen	8	1	0	1	−2	0
Peter Holland^{‡}	8	0	1	1	−2	4
Byron Froese^{‡}	2	0	0	0	0	5
Eric Fehr^{†}	1	0	0	0	−1	0
Seth Griffith^{‡}	3	0	0	0	0	0
Frank Corrado^{‡}	2	0	0	0	0	6

Playoffs
Player	GP	G	A	Pts	+/−	PIM
Auston Matthews	6	4	1	5	2	0
Morgan Rielly	6	1	4	5	1	2
Tyler Bozak	6	2	2	4	0	4
Mitch Marner	6	1	3	4	1	0
Zach Hyman	6	1	3	4	0	4
William Nylander	6	1	3	4	4	2
James van Riemsdyk	6	2	1	3	3	0
Jake Gardiner	6	1	2	3	2	4
Kasperi Kapanen	6	2	0	2	−2	0
Nazem Kadri	6	1	1	2	0	8
Brian Boyle	6	0	2	2	−2	6
Matt Martin	6	0	2	2	−2	6
Connor Brown	6	0	1	1	0	0
Leo Komarov	6	0	1	1	−1	2
Matt Hunwick	6	0	1	1	−3	2
Martin Marincin	6	0	0	0	2	2
Roman Polak	2	0	0	0	1	0
Connor Carrick	6	0	0	0	0	4
Nikita Zaitsev	4	0	0	0	−4	0

=== Goaltenders ===
Regular season
Player	GP	GS	TOI	W	L	OT	GA	GAA	SA	SV%	SO	G	A	PIM
Frederik Andersen	66	66	3799:20	33	16	14	169	2.67	2052	.918	4	0	1	16
Curtis McElhinney^{†}	14	10	758:44	6	7	0	36	2.85	418	.914	1	0	0	0
Antoine Bibeau	2	2	120:39	1	1	0	4	1.99	55	.927	0	0	0	0
Jhonas Enroth^{‡}	6	4	274:26	0	3	1	18	3.94	141	.872	0	0	0	0

Playoffs
Player	GP	GS	TOI	W	L	GA	GAA	SA	SV%	SO	G	A	PIM
Frederik Andersen	6	6	402:46	2	4	18	2.68	211	.915	0	0	0	0

^{†}Denotes player spent time with another team and has now joined the Maple Leafs. Stats reflect time with the Maple Leafs only.
^{‡}Denotes player spent time with the Maple Leafs and has now joined another team. Stats reflect time with the Maple Leafs only.
Bold/italics denotes franchise record.

== Awards and honours ==
=== Awards ===
Regular season
Player	Award	Awarded
A. Matthews	NHL Second Star of the Week	October 17, 2016
W. Nylander	NHL Rookie of the Month	October 31, 2016
A. Matthews	NHL Rookie of the Month	December 31, 2016
A. Matthews	NHL First Star of the Week	January 2, 2017
F. Andersen	NHL Third Star of the Week	January 30, 2017
M. Marner	NHL Rookie of the Month	January 31, 2017
N. Kadri	NHL Second Star of the Week	February 20, 2017
W. Nylander	NHL Rookie of the Month	March 31, 2017

=== Milestones ===
Regular season
Player	Milestone	Reached
M. Marner	1st career NHL game	October 12, 2016
A. Matthews	1st career NHL game 1st career NHL goal 1st career NHL point 1st career NHL multi-goal game 1st career NHL hat trick	October 12, 2016
N. Zaitsev	1st career NHL game	October 12, 2016
M. Marner	1st career NHL goal 1st career NHL point	October 15, 2016
N. Zaitsev	1st career NHL assist 1st career NHL point	October 15, 2016
M. Marner	1st career NHL assist	October 20, 2016
A. Matthews	1st career NHL assist	October 20, 2016
N. Kadri	200th career NHL point	October 20, 2016
M. Rielly	100th career NHL point	October 20, 2016
L. Komarov	200th career NHL game	December 15, 2016
J. Gardiner	100th career NHL assist	December 15, 2016
N. Zaitsev	1st career NHL goal	December 17, 2016
F. Gauthier	1st career NHL goal	December 22, 2016
J. van Riemsdyk	300th career NHL point	December 22, 2016
N. Kadri	100th career NHL goal	January 23, 2017
R. Polak	600th career NHL game	January 25, 2017
W. Nylander	1st career NHL hat trick	February 4, 2017
T. Bozak	300th career NHL point	February 5, 2017
C. Carrick	100th career NHL game	February 6, 2017
M. Hunwick	100th career NHL point	February 6, 2017
J. van Riemsdyk	500th career NHL game	February 11, 2017
F. Andersen	100th career NHL win	February 14, 2017
M. Martin	500th career NHL game	February 28, 2017
T. Bozak	500th career NHL game	March 16, 2017
M. Rielly	300th career NHL game	March 18, 2017
N. Kadri	400th career NHL game	March 25, 2017
J. Gardiner	400th career NHL game	March 28, 2017
L. Komarov	100th career NHL point	March 28, 2017

=== Records ===
- Auston Matthews
  - First #1 Overall pick to score a hat trick in their NHL debut: October 12, 2016
  - First 4 goal game for a player in their NHL debut: October 12, 2016
  - First Maple Leafs player to score a hat trick in their debut: October 12, 2016
  - Most points by rookie in Leafs history (69)
  - Most goals by rookie in Leafs history (40)
  - Most goals by US-born rookie (40)
  - Most game-winning goals by rookie in Leafs history (8)
- Mitch Marner
  - Most assists by rookie in Leafs history (42)
- William Nylander
  - Longest rookie point streak in Leafs history (12 games)
  - Most power play points by rookie in Leafs history (25)
  - Most power play goals by rookie in Leafs history (9)
- Zach Hyman
  - Longest rookie assist streak in Leafs history (6 games)
  - Most shorthanded goals by rookie in Leafs history (4)

== Transactions ==
The Maple Leafs have been involved in the following transactions during the 2016–17 season.

=== Trades ===
Date	Details		Ref
June 25, 2016	To Columbus Blue Jackets Scott Harrington conditional 5th-round pick in 2017	To Toronto Maple Leafs Kerby Rychel
July 8, 2016	To Anaheim Ducks Jonathan Bernier	To Toronto Maple Leafs conditional pick in 2017
December 9, 2016	To Arizona Coyotes Peter Holland	To Toronto Maple Leafs conditional 6th round pick in 2018
January 10, 2017	To Anaheim Ducks Jhonas Enroth	To Toronto Maple Leafs 7th round pick in 2018
February 18, 2017	To New Jersey Devils Viktor Loov	To Toronto Maple Leafs Sergei Kalinin
February 27, 2017	To Tampa Bay Lightning Byron Froese conditional 2nd-round pick in 2017	To Toronto Maple Leafs Brian Boyle
March 1, 2017	To Pittsburgh Penguins Frank Corrado	To Toronto Maple Leafs Eric Fehr; Steven Oleksy; 4th round pick in 2017

=== Free agents acquired ===
Players signed to professional try out contracts are not included in this table. Please see off-season for try outs.

Date	Player	Former team	Contract terms (in U.S. dollars)	Ref
July 1, 2016	Matt Martin	New York Islanders	4 years, $10 million	
July 2, 2016	Roman Polak	San Jose Sharks	1 year, $2.25 million	
July 2, 2016	Justin Holl	Toronto Marlies	1 year, $925,000 entry-level contract	
July 26, 2016	Trevor Moore	University of Denver	3 years, $5.325 million entry-level contract	
August 22, 2016	Jhonas Enroth	Los Angeles Kings	1 year, $750,000	
March 17, 2017	Miro Aaltonen	HC Vityaz Podolsk	1 year, $925,000 entry-level contract	
May 17, 2017	Calle Rosen	Växjö Lakers	2 years, $1.85 million entry-level contract	
May 17, 2017	Andreas Borgman	HV71	2 years, $1.85 million entry-level contract	

=== Free agents lost ===
Date	Player	New team	Contract terms (in U.S. dollars)	Ref
July 2, 2016	P. A. Parenteau	New York Islanders	1 year, $1.25 million	
July 1, 2016	Michael Grabner	New York Rangers	2 years, $3.3 million	
July 1, 2016	Stuart Percy	Pittsburgh Penguins	1 year, $575,000	
July 5, 2016	T. J. Brennan	Philadelphia Flyers	2 years, $1.25 million	
August 16, 2016	Ben Smith	Colorado Avalanche	1 year, $675,000	

=== Claimed via waivers ===
Player	Previous team	Date	Ref
Seth Griffith	Boston Bruins	October 11, 2016	
Ben Smith	Colorado Avalanche	October 24, 2016	
Curtis McElhinney	Columbus Blue Jackets	January 10, 2017	
Seth Griffith	Florida Panthers	January 20, 2017	
Alexey Marchenko	Detroit Red Wings	February 4, 2017	

=== Lost via waivers ===
Player	New team	Date claimed off waivers	Ref
Seth Griffith	Florida Panthers	November 12, 2016	

=== Lost via retirement ===
Player	Ref
Stephane Robidas	

=== Player signings ===
Date	Player	Contract terms (in U.S. dollars)	Ref
July 15, 2016	Garret Sparks	1 year, $575,000	
July 21, 2016	Auston Matthews	3 years, $2.775 million entry-level contract	
July 21, 2016	Josh Leivo	2 years, $1.225 million	
July 22, 2016	Connor Carrick	2 years, $1.5 million	
July 25, 2016	Peter Holland	1 year, $1.3 million	
July 25, 2016	Frank Corrado	1 year, $600,000	
July 29, 2016	Martin Marincin	2 years, $2.5 million	
March 21, 2017	Jeremy Bracco	3 years, $2.775 million entry-level contract	
April 28, 2017	Carl Grundstrom	3 years, $2.775 million entry-level contract	
May 2, 2017	Nikita Zaitsev	7 years, $31.5 million contract extension	
May 2, 2017	Ben Smith	1 year, $650,000 contract extension	

== Draft picks ==
Below are the Toronto Maple Leafs' selections at the 2016 NHL entry draft, held on June 24–25, 2016 at the First Niagara Center in Buffalo, New York. The Leafs held on to each of their picks in all seven rounds, and acquired an additional four picks through various trades.

Round	#	Player	Pos	Nationality	College/Junior/Club team (League)
1	1	Auston Matthews	(C)	United States	ZSC Lions (NLA)
2	31	Yegor Korshkov	(RW)	Russia	Lokomotiv Yaroslavl (KHL)
2	57^{a}	Carl Grundstrom	(RW)	Sweden	Modo Hockey (SHL)
3	62	Joseph Woll	(G)	United States	U.S. NTDP (USHL)
3	72^{b}	James Greenway	(D)	United States	U.S. NTDP (USHL)
4	92	Adam Brooks	(C)	Canada	Regina Pats (WHL)
4	101^{c}	Keaton Middleton	(D)	Canada	Saginaw Spirit (OHL)
5	122	Vladimir Bobylev	(RW)	Russia	Victoria Royals (WHL)
6	152	Jack Walker	(LW)	United States	Victoria Royals (WHL)
6	179^{d}	Nicolas Mattinen	(D)	Canada	London Knights (OHL)
7	182	Nikolai Chebykin	(LW)	Russia	MVD Balashikha (MHL)

=== Pick Notes ===
- ^{a} The Washington Capitals' second-round pick went to the Toronto Maple Leafs as the result of a trade on February 28, 2016 that sent Daniel Winnik and Anaheim's fifth-round pick in 2016 to Washington in exchange for Brooks Laich, Connor Carrick and this pick.
- ^{b} The New Jersey Devils' third-round pick went to the Toronto Maple Leafs as the result of a trade on July 1, 2015 that sent Phil Kessel, Tyler Biggs, Tim Erixon and a conditional second-round pick in 2016 to Pittsburgh in exchange for Nick Spaling, Kasperi Kapanen, Scott Harrington, a conditional first-round pick in 2016 and this pick.

Pittsburgh previously acquired this pick as compensation for New Jersey hiring John Hynes as their head coach on June 2, 2015.

- ^{c} The Colorado Avalanche's fourth-round pick went to the Toronto Maple Leafs as the result of a trade on February 21, 2016 that sent Shawn Matthias to Colorado in exchange for Colin Smith and this pick.
- ^{d} The St. Louis Blues' sixth-round pick went to the Toronto Maple Leafs as the result of a trade March 2, 2015 that sent Olli Jokinen to St. Louis in exchange for Joakim Lindstrom and this pick (being conditional at the time of the trade). The condition – Toronto will receive a sixth-round pick in 2016 if St. Louis fails to make it to the 2015 Stanley Cup Finals – was converted on April 26, 2015.
