= 2016–17 Dallas Stars season =

National Hockey League team season

2016–17 Dallas Stars
- Division: 6th Central
- Conference: 11th Western
- 2016–17 record: 34–37–11
- Home record: 22–13–6
- Road record: 12–24–5
- Goals for: 223
- Goals against: 262

Team information
- General manager: Jim Nill
- Coach: Lindy Ruff
- Captain: Jamie Benn
- Alternate captains: Patrick Sharp; Jason Spezza
- Arena: American Airlines Center
- Minor league affiliates: Texas Stars (AHL); Idaho Steelheads (ECHL)

Team leaders
- Goals: Tyler Seguin (26)
- Assists: Tyler Seguin (46)
- Points: Tyler Seguin (72)
- Penalty minutes: Antoine Roussel (115)
- Plus/minus: Brett Ritchie (+11)
- Wins: Kari Lehtonen (22)
- Goals against average: Kari Lehtonen (2.85)

The 2016–17 Dallas Stars season was the 50th season for the National Hockey League (NHL) franchise that was established on June 5, 1967, and 24th season since the franchise relocated from Minnesota prior to the start of the 1993–94 NHL season. The Stars missed the playoffs, finishing 11th in the Western Conference.

== Standings ==
Central Division
Pos	Team	GP	W	L	OTL	ROW	GF	GA	GD	Pts
1	z – Chicago Blackhawks	82	50	23	9	46	244	213	+31	109
2	x – Minnesota Wild	82	49	25	8	46	266	208	+58	106
3	x – St. Louis Blues	82	46	29	7	44	235	218	+17	99
4	x – Nashville Predators	82	41	29	12	39	240	224	+16	94
5	Winnipeg Jets	82	40	35	7	37	249	256	−7	87
6	Dallas Stars	82	34	37	11	33	223	262	−39	79
7	Colorado Avalanche	82	22	56	4	21	166	278	−112	48

Source: National Hockey League
x – Clinched playoff spot; z – Clinched conference

Western Conference Wild Card
Pos	Div	Team	GP	W	L	OTL	ROW	GF	GA	GD	Pts
1	PA	x – Calgary Flames	82	45	33	4	41	226	221	+5	94
2	CE	x – Nashville Predators	82	41	29	12	39	240	224	+16	94
3	CE	Winnipeg Jets	82	40	35	7	37	249	256	−7	87
4	PA	Los Angeles Kings	82	39	35	8	37	201	205	−4	86
5	CE	Dallas Stars	82	34	37	11	33	223	262	−39	79
6	PA	Arizona Coyotes	82	30	42	10	24	197	260	−63	70
7	PA	Vancouver Canucks	82	30	43	9	26	182	243	−61	69
8	CE	Colorado Avalanche	82	22	56	4	21	166	278	−112	48

Source: National Hockey League
x – Clinched playoff spot

== Schedule and results ==
=== Pre-season ===
Pre-season Game Log: 4–3–0 (Home: 2–1–0; Road: 2–2–0)
#	Date	Visitor	Score	Home	OT	Decision	Attendance	Record	Recap
1	September 26	St. Louis	1–3	Dallas		Lagace	—	1–0–0	Recap
2	September 28	Dallas	2–4	Colorado		Desrosiers	—	1–1–0	Recap
3	September 30	Dallas	1–4	St. Louis		Lehtonen	13,239	1–2–0	Recap
4	October 2	Dallas	2–1	Florida	OT	—	—	2–2–0	Recap
5	October 4	Florida	1–2	Dallas	SO	Niemi	14,321	3–2–0	Recap
6	October 5	Colorado	1–0	Dallas		Lehtonen	14,120	3–3–0	Recap
7	October 7	Dallas	6–3	Los Angeles		—	—	4–3–0	Recap

=== Regular season ===
Game Log

October: 3–4–1 (Home: 2–1–1; Road: 1–3–0)
#	Date	Visitor	Score	Home	OT	Decision	Attendance	Record	Pts	Recap
1	October 13	Anaheim	2–4	Dallas		Niemi	18,532	1–0–0	2	Recap
2	October 15	Dallas	5–6	Colorado		Lehtonen	18,007	1–1–0	2	Recap
3	October 18	Dallas	2–1	Nashville		Lehtonen	17,113	2–1–0	4	Recap
4	October 20	Los Angeles	4–3	Dallas	OT	Lehtonen	18,532	2–1–1	5	Recap
5	October 22	Columbus	3–0	Dallas		Lehtonen	18,532	2–2–1	5	Recap
6	October 25	Winnipeg	2–3	Dallas		Niemi	18,040	3–2–1	7	Recap
7	October 27	Dallas	1–4	Winnipeg		Niemi	15,294	3–3–1	7	Recap
8	October 29	Dallas	0–4	Minnesota		Lehtonen	19,031	3–4–1	7	Recap

November: 6–5–5 (Home: 4–2–1; Road: 2–3–4)
#	Date	Visitor	Score	Home	OT	Decision	Attendance	Record	Pts	Recap
9	November 1	Dallas	2–3	Columbus	OT	Niemi	10,141	3–4–2	8	Recap
10	November 3	St. Louis	2–6	Dallas		Niemi	18,532	4–4–2	10	Recap
11	November 5	Chicago	3–2	Dallas		Niemi	18,532	4–5–2	10	Recap
12	November 6	Dallas	3–4	Chicago	OT	Lehtonen	21,901	4–5–3	11	Recap
13	November 8	Dallas	2–8	Winnipeg		Lehtonen	15,294	4–6–3	11	Recap
14	November 10	Dallas	4–2	Calgary		Lehtonen	18,795	5–6–3	13	Recap
15	November 11	Dallas	3–2	Edmonton		Lehtonen	18,347	6–6–3	15	Recap
16	November 13	Dallas	4–5	Vancouver	OT	Lehtonen	18,470	6–6–4	16	Recap
17	November 15	New Jersey	2–1	Dallas	OT	Niemi	18,039	6–6–5	17	Recap
18	November 17	Colorado	2–3	Dallas		Lehtonen	18,237	7–6–5	19	Recap
19	November 19	Edmonton	5–2	Dallas		Lehtonen	18,352	7–7–5	19	Recap
20	November 21	Minnesota	2–3	Dallas	OT	Niemi	18,532	8–7–5	21	Recap
21	November 23	Dallas	2–5	Nashville		Lehtonen	17,119	8–8–5	21	Recap
22	November 25	Vancouver	1–2	Dallas		Niemi	18,532	9–8–5	23	Recap
23	November 28	Dallas	3–4	St. Louis	OT	Niemi	17,169	9–8–6	24	Recap
24	November 29	Dallas	1–3	Detroit		Lehtonen	20,027	9–9–6	24	Recap

December: 7–6–1 (Home: 5–3–1; Road: 2–3–0)
#	Date	Visitor	Score	Home	OT	Decision	Attendance	Record	Pts	Recap
25	December 1	Dallas	2–6	Pittsburgh		Niemi	18,420	9–10–6	24	Recap
26	December 3	Dallas	3–0	Colorado		Lehtonen	16,725	10–10–6	26	Recap
27	December 6	Calgary	2–1	Dallas		Lehtonen	17,996	10–11–6	26	Recap
28	December 8	Nashville	2–5	Dallas		Lehtonen	17,887	11–11–6	28	Recap
29	December 10	Dallas	2–4	Philadelphia		Lehtonen	19,594	11–12–6	28	Recap
30	December 11	Dallas	1–3	Chicago		Lehtonen	21,451	11–13–6	28	Recap
31	December 13	Anaheim	2–6	Dallas		Niemi	17,543	12–13–6	30	Recap
32	December 15	NY Rangers	2–0	Dallas		Niemi	18,212	12–14–6	30	Recap
33	December 17	Philadelphia	1–3	Dallas		Niemi	18,243	13–14–6	32	Recap
34	December 20	St. Louis	3–2	Dallas	OT	Niemi	18,532	13–14–7	33	Recap
35	December 23	Los Angeles	2–3	Dallas	OT	Lehtonen	18,156	14–14–7	35	Recap
36	December 27	Dallas	3–2	Arizona		Lehtonen	14,561	15–14–7	37	Recap
37	December 29	Colorado	4–2	Dallas		Lehtonen	18,532	16–14–7	39	Recap
38	December 31	Florida	3–1	Dallas		Lehtonen	18,532	16–15–7	39	Recap

January: 5–5–3 (Home: 3–1–3; Road: 2–4–0)
#	Date	Visitor	Score	Home	OT	Decision	Attendance	Record	Pts	Recap
39	January 4	Montreal	4–3	Dallas	OT	Lehtonen	18,106	16–15–8	40	Recap
40	January 7	Dallas	3–4	St. Louis		Niemi	19,503	16–16–8	40	Recap
41	January 9	Dallas	6–4	Los Angeles		Niemi	18,230	17–16–8	42	Recap
42	January 10	Dallas	0–2	Anaheim		Niemi	15,073	17–17–8	42	Recap
43	January 12	Detroit	2–5	Dallas		Niemi	18,532	18–17–8	44	Recap
44	January 14	Minnesota	5–4	Dallas		Lehtonen	18,532	18–18–8	44	Recap
45	January 16	Dallas	1–4	Buffalo		Lehtonen	19,070	18–19–8	44	Recap
46	January 17	Dallas	7–6	NY Rangers		Niemi	18,006	19–19–8	46	Recap
47	January 19	Dallas	0–3	NY Islanders		Lehtonen	12,630	19–20–8	46	Recap
48	January 21	Washington	4–3	Dallas	OT	Lehtonen	18,532	19–20–9	47	Recap
49	January 24	Minnesota	3–2	Dallas	SO	Lehtonen	17,877	19–20–10	48	Recap
50	January 26	Buffalo	3–4	Dallas		Lehtonen	17,856	20–20–10	50	Recap
January 27–29		All-Star Break in Los Angeles
51	January 31	Toronto	3–6	Dallas		Lehtonen	17,547	21–20–10	52	Recap

February: 4–8–0 (Home: 4–3–0; Road: 0–5–0)
#	Date	Visitor	Score	Home	OT	Decision	Attendance	Record	Pts	Recap
52	February 2	Winnipeg	4–3	Dallas		Lehtonen	17,236	21–21–10	52	Recap
53	February 4	Chicago	5–3	Dallas		Lehtonen	18,532	21–22–10	52	Recap
54	February 7	Dallas	1–3	Toronto		Niemi	19,233	21–23–10	52	Recap
55	February 9	Dallas	2–3	Ottawa		Lehtonen	17,676	21–24–10	52	Recap
56	February 11	Carolina	2–5	Dallas		Lehtonen	17,864	22–24–10	54	Recap
57	February 12	Dallas	3–5	Nashville		Lehtonen	17,113	22–25–10	54	Recap
58	February 14	Dallas	2–5	Winnipeg		Niemi	15,294	22–26–10	54	Recap
59	February 16	Dallas	1–3	Minnesota		Lehtonen	19,084	22–27–10	54	Recap
60	February 18	Tampa Bay	3–4	Dallas	OT	Lehtonen	18,210	23–27–10	56	Recap
61	February 24	Arizona	2–5	Dallas		Lehtonen	18,043	24–27–10	58	Recap
62	February 26	Boston	6–3	Dallas		Lehtonen	18,006	24–28–10	58	Recap
63	February 28	Pittsburgh	2–3	Dallas		Niemi	18,235	25–28–10	60	Recap

March: 6–7–1 (Home: 2–2–0; Road: 4–5–1)
#	Date	Visitor	Score	Home	OT	Decision	Attendance	Record	Pts	Recap
64	March 2	NY Islanders	5–4	Dallas		Niemi	17,438	25–29–10	60	Recap
65	March 4	Dallas	2–1	Florida		Lehtonen	15,713	26–29–10	62	Recap
66	March 6	Dallas	4–2	Washington		Lehtonen	18,506	27–29–10	64	Recap
67	March 8	Ottawa	5–2	Dallas		Lehtonen	17,689	27–30–10	64	Recap
68	March 12	Dallas	1–5	San Jose		Lehtonen	17,442	27–31–10	64	Recap
69	March 14	Dallas	1–7	Edmonton		Niemi	18,347	27–32–10	64	Recap
70	March 16	Dallas	4–2	Vancouver		Lehtonen	18,865	28–32–10	66	Recap
71	March 17	Dallas	1–3	Calgary		Lehtonen	19,227	28–33–10	66	Recap
72	March 20	San Jose	0–1	Dallas		Lehtonen	17,687	29–33–10	68	Recap
73	March 23	Dallas	2–3	Chicago	SO	Lehtonen	21,798	29–33–11	69	Recap
74	March 24	San Jose	1–6	Dallas		Lehtonen	17,265	30–33–11	71	Recap
75	March 26	Dallas	2–1	New Jersey	OT	Lehtonen	14,711	31–33–11	73	Recap
76	March 28	Dallas	1–4	Montreal		Lehtonen	21,288	31–34–11	73	Recap
77	March 30	Dallas	0–2	Boston		Niemi	17,565	31–35–11	73	Recap

April: 3–2–0 (Home: 2–1–0; Road: 1–1–0)
#	Date	Visitor	Score	Home	OT	Decision	Attendance	Record	Pts	Recap
78	April 1	Dallas	3–0	Carolina		Lehtonen	14,201	32–35–11	75	Recap
79	April 2	Dallas	3–6	Tampa Bay		Lehtonen	19,092	32–36–11	75	Recap
80	April 4	Arizona	2–3	Dallas	OT	Niemi	16,876	33–36–11	77	Recap
81	April 6	Nashville	7–3	Dallas		Lehtonen	17,543	33–37–11	77	Recap
82	April 8	Colorado	3–4	Dallas	SO	Lehtonen	18,532	34–37–11	79	Recap

Legend: Win (2 points) Loss (0 points) Overtime/shootout loss (1 point)

== Player statistics ==
Final stats

=== Skaters ===
Regular season
Player	GP	G	A	Pts	+/−	PIM
Tyler Seguin	82	26	46	72	−15	22
Jamie Benn	77	26	43	69	−9	66
Jason Spezza	68	15	35	50	−18	29
John Klingberg	80	13	36	49	2	34
Patrick Eaves^{‡}	59	21	16	37	−10	16
Devin Shore	82	13	20	33	−4	14
Radek Faksa	80	12	21	33	−6	67
Antoine Roussel	60	12	15	27	1	115
Brett Ritchie	78	16	8	24	11	38
Lauri Korpikoski^{‡}	60	8	12	20	5	10
Patrick Sharp	48	8	10	18	−22	31
Esa Lindell	73	6	12	18	8	22
Adam Cracknell	69	10	6	16	9	12
Curtis McKenzie	53	6	10	16	5	72
Dan Hamhuis	79	1	15	16	−7	23
Jordie Benn^{‡}	58	2	13	15	−3	24
Cody Eakin	60	3	9	12	−7	49
Jiri Hudler	32	3	8	11	−3	4
Stephen Johns	61	4	6	10	−10	36
Jamie Oleksiak	41	5	2	7	−4	37
Ales Hemsky	15	4	3	7	−1	0
Remi Elie	18	1	6	7	5	8
Johnny Oduya^{‡}	37	1	6	7	−2	10
Gemel Smith	17	3	3	6	−1	21
Julius Honka	16	1	4	5	−4	4
Patrik Nemeth	40	0	3	3	−4	14
Greg Pateryn^{†}	12	0	3	3	−2	6
Jason Dickinson	10	2	0	2	−3	0
Justin Dowling	9	0	2	2	0	2
Denis Gurianov	1	0	0	0	−1	0
Mark McNeill	1	0	0	0	−1	0

=== Goaltenders ===
Regular season
Player	GP	GS	TOI	W	L	OT	GA	GAA	SA	SV%	SO	G	A	PIM
Kari Lehtonen	59	52	3177:09	22	25	7	151	2.85	1546	.902	3	0	1	4
Antti Niemi	37	30	1728:30	12	12	4	95	3.30	880	.892	0	0	0	0

^{†}Denotes player spent time with another team before joining the Stars. Stats reflect time with the Stars only.
^{‡}Traded mid-season
Bold/italics denotes franchise record

== Transactions ==
The Stars have been involved in the following transactions during the 2016–17 season:

=== Trades ===
Date	Details		Ref
June 16, 2016	To Arizona Coyotes Alex Goligoski (negotiating rights)	To Dallas Stars 5th-round pick in 2016
June 25, 2016	To Los Angeles Kings Jack Campbell	To Dallas Stars Nick Ebert
February 1, 2017	To Arizona Coyotes Brendan Ranford; Branden Troock	To Dallas Stars Justin Peters; Justin Hache
February 24, 2017	To Anaheim Ducks Patrick Eaves	To Dallas Stars conditional 2nd-round pick in 2017
February 27, 2017	To Montreal Canadiens Jordie Benn	To Dallas Stars Greg Pateryn; 4th-round pick in 2017
February 28, 2017	To Chicago Blackhawks Johnny Oduya	To Dallas Stars Mark McNeill conditional 4th-round pick in 2018
March 1, 2017	To Columbus Blue Jackets Lauri Korpikoski	To Dallas Stars Dillon Heatherington
May 9, 2017	To Los Angeles Kings MTL's 4th-round pick in 2017	To Dallas Stars Ben Bishop (rights)

=== Free agents acquired ===
Date	Player	Former team	Contract terms (in U.S. dollars)	Ref
July 1, 2016	Dan Hamhuis	Vancouver Canucks	2 years, $7.5 million	
July 1, 2016	Andrew Bodnarchuk	Colorado Avalanche	2 years, $1.45 million	
July 1, 2016	Dustin Stevenson	Stockton Heat	1 year, $600,000	
July 3, 2016	Adam Cracknell	Edmonton Oilers	1 year, $600,000	
August 24, 2016	Jiri Hudler	Florida Panthers	1 year, $2 million	
September 29, 2016	Ondrej Vala	Kamloops Blazers	3 years, entry-level contract	
October 10, 2016	Lauri Korpikoski	Edmonton Oilers	1 years, $1 million	
March 10, 2017	Landon Bow	Texas Stars	2 years, entry-level contract	
March 15, 2017	Gavin Bayreuther	St. Lawrence University	2 years, entry-level contract	

=== Free agents lost ===
Date	Player	New team	Contract terms (in U.S. dollars)	Ref
July 1, 2016	Colton Sceviour	Florida Panthers	2 years, $1.9 million	
July 1, 2016	Jason Demers	Florida Panthers	5 years, $22.5 million	
July 1, 2016	Vernon Fiddler	New Jersey Devils	1 year, $1.25 million	
September 29, 2016	Valeri Nichushkin	CSKA Moscow	2 years, undisclosed	
October 7, 2016	Kris Russell	Edmonton Oilers	1 year, $3.1 million	

=== Claimed via waivers ===
Player	Previous team	Date	Ref

=== Lost via waivers ===
Player	New team	Date	Ref

=== Lost via retirement ===
Date	Player	Ref

=== Player signings ===
Date	Player	Contract terms (in U.S. dollars)	Ref
June 24, 2016	Jordie Benn	3 years, $3.3 million	
June 30, 2016	Maxime Lagace	1 year, $600,000	
June 30, 2016	Patrick Eaves	1 year, $1 million	
July 12, 2016	Jamie Oleksiak	1 year, $918,750	
July 15, 2016	Jamie Benn	8 years, $76 million contract extension	
July 18, 2016	Matej Stransky	1 year, $575,000	
March 8, 2017	Adam Cracknell	1 year, $675,000 contract extension	
March 10, 2017	Curtis McKenzie	1 year, $700,000 contract extension	
April 6, 2017	Nicholas Caamano	3 years, $2.235 million entry-level contract	
April 27, 2017	Mattias Janmark	1 year, $700,000 contract extension	
May 4, 2017	Roope Hintz	3 years, $2.775 million entry-level contract	
May 8, 2017	Justin Dowling	2 years, $1.3 million contract extension	
May 12, 2017	Ben Bishop	6 years, $29.5 million contract extension	
May 18, 2017	John Nyberg	3 years, $2.235 million entry-level contract	
June 17, 2017	Ludwig Bystrom	1 year, $650,000 contract extension	

== Draft picks ==
Below are the Dallas Stars' selections at the 2016 NHL entry draft, to be held on June 24–25, 2016 at the First Niagara Center in Buffalo.

Round	#	Player	Pos	Nationality	College/Junior/Club team (League)
1	25	Riley Tufte	LW	United States	Fargo Force (USHL)
3	90^{[a]}	Fredrik Karlstrom	C	Sweden	AIK (Swe-Jr)
4	116	Rhett Gardner	C	Canada	North Dakota Fighting Hawks (NCHC)
5	128^{[b]}	Colton Point	G	Canada	Carleton Place Canadians (CCHL)
5	146	Nicholas Caamano	RW	Canada	Flint Firebirds (OHL)
6	176	Jakob Stenqvist	D	Sweden	Modo-jr. (SWE-jr.)

Notes

- The Dallas Stars' second-round pick went to the Calgary Flames as the result of a trade on February 29, 2016 that sent Kris Russell to Dallas in exchange for Jyrki Jokipakka, Brett Pollock and this pick (being conditional at time of the trade). The condition – Calgary will receive a second-round pick in 2016 if Dallas fails to qualify for the 2016 Western Conference Final – was converted on May 11, 2016.
- The Dallas Stars' third-round pick went to the Buffalo Sabres as the result of a trade on February 11, 2015 that sent Jhonas Enroth to Dallas in exchange for Anders Lindback and this pick (being conditional at the time of the trade). The condition – Buffalo will receive a third-round pick in 2016 if Enroth wins fewer than four playoff games for the Stars in 2015 – was converted on April 6, 2015 when the Stars were eliminated from playoff contention.
- ^{[a]} The San Jose Sharks' third-round pick went to the Dallas Stars as the result of a trade on November 21, 2014 that sent Brenden Dillon to San Jose in exchange for Jason Demers and this pick.
- ^{[b]} The Arizona Coyotes' fifth-round pick went to the Dallas Stars as the result of a trade on June 16, 2016 that sent Alex Goligoski to Arizona in exchange for this pick.
- The Dallas Stars' seventh-round pick went to the Tampa Bay Lightning as the result of a trade on June 27, 2015 that sent Anaheim's seventh-round pick in 2015 to Edmonton in exchange for this pick.

Edmonton previously acquired this pick as the result of a trade on July 5, 2013 that sent Shawn Horcoff to Dallas in exchange for Philip Larsen and this pick.
