= 2016–17 Boston Bruins season =

NHL team season

2016–17 Boston Bruins
- Division: 3rd Atlantic
- Conference: 7th Eastern
- 2016–17 record: 44–31–7
- Home record: 23–17–1
- Road record: 21–14–6
- Goals for: 234
- Goals against: 212

Team information
- General manager: Don Sweeney
- Coach: Claude Julien (Oct. 13 – Feb. 7); Bruce Cassidy (Feb. 7 – Apr. 23)
- Captain: Zdeno Chara
- Alternate captains: Patrice Bergeron; David Krejci
- Arena: TD Garden
- Minor league affiliates: Providence Bruins (AHL); Atlanta Gladiators (ECHL)

Team leaders
- Goals: Brad Marchand (39)
- Assists: Brad Marchand (46)
- Points: Brad Marchand (85)
- Penalty minutes: Brad Marchand (81)
- Plus/minus: Zdeno Chara and Brad Marchand (+18)
- Wins: Tuukka Rask (37)
- Goals against average: Tuukka Rask (2.23)

The 2016–17 Boston Bruins season was the 93rd season for the National Hockey League (NHL) franchise that was established on November 1, 1924. After narrowly missing the Stanley Cup playoffs in each of the past two years, the team returned in 2017, losing to the Ottawa Senators in the first round in six games.

== Standings ==
Atlantic Division
| Pos | Team | GP | W | L | OTL | ROW | GF | GA | GD | Pts |
|---|---|---|---|---|---|---|---|---|---|---|
| 1 | y – Montreal Canadiens | 82 | 47 | 26 | 9 | 44 | 226 | 200 | +26 | 103 |
| 2 | x – Ottawa Senators | 82 | 44 | 28 | 10 | 38 | 212 | 214 | −2 | 98 |
| 3 | x – Boston Bruins | 82 | 44 | 31 | 7 | 42 | 234 | 212 | +22 | 95 |
| 4 | x – Toronto Maple Leafs | 82 | 40 | 27 | 15 | 39 | 251 | 242 | +9 | 95 |
| 5 | Tampa Bay Lightning | 82 | 42 | 30 | 10 | 38 | 234 | 227 | +7 | 94 |
| 6 | Florida Panthers | 82 | 35 | 36 | 11 | 30 | 210 | 237 | −27 | 81 |
| 7 | Detroit Red Wings | 82 | 33 | 36 | 13 | 24 | 207 | 244 | −37 | 79 |
| 8 | Buffalo Sabres | 82 | 33 | 37 | 12 | 31 | 201 | 237 | −36 | 78 |

Source: National Hockey League
x – Clinched playoff spot; y – Clinched division

== Schedule and results ==
=== Pre-season ===
2016 Pre-season Game Log: 3–2–2 (Home: 0–1–1; Road: 3–1–1)
| # | Date | Visitor | Score | Home | OT | Decision | Attendance | Record | Recap |
|---|---|---|---|---|---|---|---|---|---|
| 1 | September 26 | Columbus Blue Jackets | 3–2 | Boston Bruins | OT | McIntyre | 16,285 | 0–0–1 | Recap |
| 2 | September 28 | Detroit Red Wings | 5–1 | Boston Bruins | | Subban | 16,631 | 0–1–1 | Recap |
| 3 | September 30 | Boston Bruins | 2–1 | Detroit Red Wings | | Khudobin | — | 1–1–1 | Recap |
| 4 | October 1 | Boston Bruins | 4–3 | Philadelphia Flyers | SO | Subban | 17,920 | 2–1–1 | Recap |
| 5 | October 4 | Boston Bruins | 3–4 | Montreal Canadiens | | — | — | 2–2–1 | Recap |
| 6 | October 6 | Boston Bruins | 2–1 | Columbus Blue Jackets | — | Khudobin | 8,851 | 3–2–1 | Recap |
| 7 | October 8 | Philadelphia Flyers | 0–1 | Boston Bruins | OT | Rask | 17,202 | 3–2–2 | Recap |

=== Regular season ===
2016–17 Game Log

October: 4–4–0 (Home: 1–2–0; Road: 3–2–0)
| # | Date | Visitor | Score | Home | OT | Decision | Attendance | Record | Pts | Recap |
|---|---|---|---|---|---|---|---|---|---|---|
| 1 | October 13 | Boston Bruins | 6–3 | Columbus Blue Jackets | | Rask | 18,144 | 1–0–0 | 2 | Recap |
| 2 | October 15 | Boston Bruins | 1–4 | Toronto Maple Leafs | | Khudobin | 19,466 | 1–1–0 | 2 | Recap |
| 3 | October 17 | Boston Bruins | 4–1 | Winnipeg Jets | | Rask | 15,296 | 2–1–0 | 4 | Recap |
| 4 | October 20 | New Jersey Devils | 1–2 | Boston Bruins | | Rask | 17,565 | 3–1–0 | 6 | Recap |
| 5 | October 22 | Montreal Canadiens | 4–2 | Boston Bruins | | Khudobin | 17,565 | 3–2–0 | 6 | Recap |
| 6 | October 25 | Minnesota Wild | 5–0 | Boston Bruins | | Subban | 17,565 | 3–3–0 | 6 | Recap |
| 7 | October 26 | Boston Bruins | 2–5 | New York Rangers | | McIntyre | 18,006 | 3–4–0 | 6 | Recap |
| 8 | October 29 | Boston Bruins | 1–0 | Detroit Red Wings | | Rask | 20,027 | 4–4–0 | 8 | Recap |

November: 8–6–1 (Home: 4–3–0; Road: 4–3–1)
| # | Date | Visitor | Score | Home | OT | Decision | Attendance | Record | Pts | Recap |
|---|---|---|---|---|---|---|---|---|---|---|
| 9 | November 1 | Boston Bruins | 2–1 | Florida Panthers | | Rask | 13,808 | 5–4–0 | 10 | Recap |
| 10 | November 3 | Boston Bruins | 4–3 | Tampa Bay Lightning | SO | Rask | 19,092 | 6–4–0 | 12 | Recap |
| 11 | November 5 | New York Rangers | 5–2 | Boston Bruins | | Rask | 17,565 | 6–5–0 | 12 | Recap |
| 12 | November 7 | Buffalo Sabres | 0–4 | Boston Bruins | | Rask | 17,565 | 7–5–0 | 14 | Recap |
| 13 | November 8 | Boston Bruins | 2–3 | Montreal Canadiens | | McIntyre | 21,288 | 7–6–0 | 14 | Recap |
| 14 | November 10 | Columbus Blue Jackets | 2–5 | Boston Bruins | | Rask | 17,565 | 8–6–0 | 16 | Recap |
| 15 | November 12 | Boston Bruins | 2–1 | Arizona Coyotes | | Rask | 16,531 | 9–6–0 | 18 | Recap |
| 16 | November 13 | Boston Bruins | 2–0 | Colorado Avalanche | | Rask | 15,808 | 10–6–0 | 20 | Recap |
| 17 | November 17 | Boston Bruins | 0–1 | Minnesota Wild | | Rask | 18,774 | 10–7–0 | 20 | Recap |
| 18 | November 19 | Winnipeg Jets | 1–4 | Boston Bruins | | Rask | 17,565 | 11–7–0 | 22 | Recap |
| 19 | November 22 | St. Louis Blues | 4–2 | Boston Bruins | | Rask | 17,565 | 11–8–0 | 22 | Recap |
| 20 | November 24 | Boston Bruins | 1–3 | Ottawa Senators | | Rask | 17,191 | 11–9–0 | 22 | Recap |
| 21 | November 25 | Calgary Flames | 2–1 | Boston Bruins | | Khudobin | 17,565 | 11–10–0 | 22 | Recap |
| 22 | November 27 | Tampa Bay Lightning | 1–4 | Boston Bruins | | Rask | 17,565 | 12–10–0 | 24 | Recap |
| 23 | November 29 | Boston Bruins | 2–3 | Philadelphia Flyers | SO | Rask | 19,558 | 12–10–1 | 25 | Recap |

December: 8–5–3 (Home: 4–4–0; Road: 4–1–3)
| # | Date | Visitor | Score | Home | OT | Decision | Attendance | Record | Pts | Recap |
|---|---|---|---|---|---|---|---|---|---|---|
| 24 | December 1 | Carolina Hurricanes | 1–2 | Boston Bruins | SO | Khudobin | 17,565 | 13–10–1 | 27 | Recap |
| 25 | December 3 | Boston Bruins | 2–1 | Buffalo Sabres | | Rask | 19,070 | 14–10–1 | 29 | Recap |
| 26 | December 5 | Florida Panthers | 3–4 | Boston Bruins | OT | Rask | 17,565 | 15–10–1 | 31 | Recap |
| 27 | December 7 | Boston Bruins | 3–4 | Washington Capitals | OT | Rask | 18,506 | 15–10–2 | 32 | Recap |
| 28 | December 8 | Colorado Avalanche | 4–2 | Boston Bruins | | Khudobin | 17,565 | 15–11–2 | 32 | Recap |
| 29 | December 10 | Toronto Maple Leafs | 4–1 | Boston Bruins | | Rask | 17,565 | 15–12–2 | 32 | Recap |
| 30 | December 12 | Boston Bruins | 2–1 | Montreal Canadiens | OT | Rask | 21,288 | 16–12–2 | 34 | Recap |
| 31 | December 14 | Boston Bruins | 3–4 | Pittsburgh Penguins | OT | Rask | 18,415 | 16–12–3 | 35 | Recap |
| 32 | December 15 | Anaheim Ducks | 4–3 | Boston Bruins | | Khudobin | 17,565 | 16–13–3 | 35 | Recap |
| 33 | December 18 | Los Angeles Kings | 0–1 | Boston Bruins | | Rask | 17,565 | 17–13–3 | 37 | Recap |
| 34 | December 20 | New York Islanders | 4–2 | Boston Bruins | | Rask | 17,565 | 17–14–3 | 37 | Recap |
| 35 | December 22 | Boston Bruins | 3–1 | Florida Panthers | | Rask | 14,462 | 18–14–3 | 39 | Recap |
| 36 | December 23 | Boston Bruins | 2–3 | Carolina Hurricanes | OT | Khudobin | 12,924 | 18–14–4 | 40 | Recap |
| 37 | December 27 | Boston Bruins | 3–4 | Columbus Blue Jackets | | Rask | 19,005 | 18–15–4 | 40 | Recap |
| 38 | December 29 | Boston Bruins | 4–2 | Buffalo Sabres | | Rask | 19,070 | 19–15–4 | 42 | Recap |
| 39 | December 31 | Buffalo Sabres | 1–3 | Boston Bruins | | Rask | 17,565 | 20–15–4 | 44 | Recap |

January: 6–6–2 (Home: 3–3–0; Road: 3–3–2)
| # | Date | Visitor | Score | Home | OT | Decision | Attendance | Record | Pts | Recap |
|---|---|---|---|---|---|---|---|---|---|---|
| 40 | January 2 | Boston Bruins | 0–3 | New Jersey Devils | | Rask | 15,141 | 20–16–4 | 44 | Recap |
| 41 | January 5 | Edmonton Oilers | 4–3 | Boston Bruins | | Rask | 17,565 | 20–17–4 | 44 | Recap |
| 42 | January 7 | Boston Bruins | 4–0 | Florida Panthers | | Rask | 16,630 | 21–17–4 | 46 | Recap |
| 43 | January 8 | Boston Bruins | 3–4 | Carolina Hurricanes | OT | McIntyre | 11,820 | 21–17–5 | 47 | Recap |
| 44 | January 10 | Boston Bruins | 5–3 | St. Louis Blues | | Rask | 19,342 | 22–17–5 | 49 | Recap |
| 45 | January 12 | Boston Bruins | 1–2 | Nashville Predators | | McIntyre | 17,113 | 22–18–5 | 49 | Recap |
| 46 | January 14 | Philadelphia Flyers | 3–6 | Boston Bruins | | Rask | 17,565 | 23–18–5 | 51 | Recap |
| 47 | January 16 | New York Islanders | 4–0 | Boston Bruins | | Rask | 17,565 | 23–19–5 | 51 | Recap |
| 48 | January 18 | Boston Bruins | 5–6 | Detroit Red Wings | SO | Rask | 20,027 | 23–19–6 | 52 | Recap |
| 49 | January 20 | Chicago Blackhawks | 1–0 | Boston Bruins | | Rask | 17,565 | 23–20–6 | 52 | Recap |
| 50 | January 22 | Boston Bruins | 1–5 | Pittsburgh Penguins | | Rask | 18,506 | 23–21–6 | 52 | Recap |
| 51 | January 24 | Detroit Red Wings | 3–4 | Boston Bruins | OT | Rask | 17,565 | 24–21–6 | 54 | Recap |
| 52 | January 26 | Pittsburgh Penguins | 3–4 | Boston Bruins | | Rask | 17,565 | 25–21–6 | 56 | Recap |
| January 27–29 | | All-Star Break in Los Angeles |
| 53 | January 31 | Boston Bruins | 4–3 | Tampa Bay Lightning | | Rask | 19,092 | 26–21–6 | 58 | Recap |

February: 7–3–0 (Home: 4–1–0; Road: 3–2–0)
| # | Date | Visitor | Score | Home | OT | Decision | Attendance | Record | Pts | Recap |
|---|---|---|---|---|---|---|---|---|---|---|
| 54 | February 1 | Boston Bruins | 3–5 | Washington Capitals | | Rask | 18,506 | 26–22–6 | 58 | Recap |
| 55 | February 4 | Toronto Maple Leafs | 6–5 | Boston Bruins | | McIntyre | 17,565 | 26–23–6 | 58 | Recap |
| 56 | February 9 | San Jose Sharks | 3–6 | Boston Bruins | | Rask | 17,565 | 27–23–6 | 60 | Recap |
| 57 | February 11 | Vancouver Canucks | 3–4 | Boston Bruins | | Khudobin | 17,565 | 28–23–6 | 62 | Recap |
| 58 | February 12 | Montreal Canadiens | 0–4 | Boston Bruins | | Rask | 17,565 | 29–23–6 | 64 | Recap |
| 59 | February 19 | Boston Bruins | 2–1 | San Jose Sharks | OT | Rask | 17,562 | 30–23–6 | 66 | Recap |
| 60 | February 22 | Boston Bruins | 3–5 | Anaheim Ducks | | Rask | 15,135 | 30–24–6 | 66 | Recap |
| 61 | February 23 | Boston Bruins | 4–1 | Los Angeles Kings | | Khudobin | 18,230 | 31–24–6 | 68 | Recap |
| 62 | February 26 | Boston Bruins | 6–3 | Dallas Stars | | Rask | 18,006 | 32–24–6 | 70 | Recap |
| 63 | February 28 | Arizona Coyotes | 1–4 | Boston Bruins | | Rask | 17,565 | 33–24–6 | 72 | Recap |

March: 8–6–0 (Home: 5–3–0; Road: 3–3–0)
| # | Date | Visitor | Score | Home | OT | Decision | Attendance | Record | Pts | Recap |
|---|---|---|---|---|---|---|---|---|---|---|
| 64 | March 2 | New York Rangers | 2–1 | Boston Bruins | | Rask | 17,565 | 33–25–6 | 72 | Recap |
| 65 | March 4 | New Jersey Devils | 2–3 | Boston Bruins | | Khudobin | 17,565 | 34–25–6 | 74 | Recap |
| 66 | March 6 | Boston Bruins | 2–4 | Ottawa Senators | | Rask | 17,046 | 34–26–6 | 74 | Recap |
| 67 | March 8 | Detroit Red Wings | 1–6 | Boston Bruins | | Rask | 17,565 | 35–26–6 | 76 | Recap |
| 68 | March 11 | Philadelphia Flyers | 1–2 | Boston Bruins | | Rask | 17,565 | 36–26–6 | 78 | Recap |
| 69 | March 13 | Boston Bruins | 6–3 | Vancouver Canucks | | Rask | 18,865 | 37–26–6 | 80 | Recap |
| 70 | March 15 | Boston Bruins | 5–2 | Calgary Flames | | Khudobin | 18,892 | 38–26–6 | 82 | Recap |
| 71 | March 16 | Boston Bruins | 4–7 | Edmonton Oilers | | Rask | 18,347 | 38–27–6 | 82 | Recap |
| 72 | March 20 | Boston Bruins | 2–4 | Toronto Maple Leafs | | Rask | 19,347 | 38–28–6 | 82 | Recap |
| 73 | March 21 | Ottawa Senators | 3–2 | Boston Bruins | | Rask | 17,565 | 38–29–6 | 82 | Recap |
| 74 | March 23 | Tampa Bay Lightning | 6–3 | Boston Bruins | | Rask | 17,565 | 38–30–6 | 82 | Recap |
| 75 | March 25 | Boston Bruins | 2–1 | New York Islanders | | Khudobin | 15,795 | 39–30–6 | 84 | Recap |
| 76 | March 28 | Nashville Predators | 1–4 | Boston Bruins | | Rask | 17,565 | 40–30–6 | 86 | Recap |
| 77 | March 30 | Dallas Stars | 0–2 | Boston Bruins | | Rask | 17,565 | 41–30–6 | 88 | Recap |

April: 3–1–1 (Home: 2–1–1; Road: 1–0–0)
| # | Date | Visitor | Score | Home | OT | Decision | Attendance | Record | Pts | Recap |
|---|---|---|---|---|---|---|---|---|---|---|
| 78 | April 1 | Florida Panthers | 2–5 | Boston Bruins | | Rask | 17,565 | 42–30–6 | 90 | Recap |
| 79 | April 2 | Boston Bruins | 3–2 | Chicago Blackhawks | | Khudobin | 22,131 | 43–30–6 | 92 | Recap |
| 80 | April 4 | Tampa Bay Lightning | 0–4 | Boston Bruins | | Rask | 17,565 | 44–30–6 | 94 | Recap |
| 81 | April 6 | Ottawa Senators | 2–1 | Boston Bruins | SO | Rask | 17,565 | 44–30–7 | 95 | Recap |
| 82 | April 8 | Washington Capitals | 3–1 | Boston Bruins | | Khudobin | 17,565 | 44–31–7 | 95 | Recap |

Legend: Win (2 points) Loss (0 points) Overtime/shootout loss (1 point)

== Playoffs ==
The Bruins clinched the playoffs for the first time since the 2013–14 season. They met the Ottawa Senators in the first round, where they were ultimately defeated in six games.

2017 Stanley Cup Playoffs

Eastern Conference First Round vs. (A2) Ottawa Senators: Ottawa wins series 4–2
| # | Date | Visitor | Score | Home | OT | Decision | Attendance | Series | Recap |
|---|---|---|---|---|---|---|---|---|---|
| 1 | April 12 | Boston Bruins | 2–1 | Ottawa Senators | | Rask | 18,702 | 1–0 | Recap |
| 2 | April 15 | Boston Bruins | 3–4 | Ottawa Senators | OT | Rask | 18,629 | 1–1 | Recap |
| 3 | April 17 | Ottawa Senators | 4–3 | Boston Bruins | OT | Rask | 17,565 | 1–2 | Recap |
| 4 | April 19 | Ottawa Senators | 1–0 | Boston Bruins | | Rask | 17,565 | 1–3 | Recap |
| 5 | April 21 | Boston Bruins | 3–2 | Ottawa Senators | 2OT | Rask | 19,209 | 2–3 | Recap |
| 6 | April 23 | Ottawa Senators | 3–2 | Boston Bruins | OT | Rask | 17,565 | 2–4 | Recap |

Legend: Win Loss

== Player stats ==
Final Stats

=== Skaters ===
Regular season
| Player | GP | G | A | Pts | +/− | PIM |
|---|---|---|---|---|---|---|
| Brad Marchand | 80 | 39 | 46 | 85 | 18 | 81 |
| David Pastrnak | 75 | 34 | 36 | 70 | 11 | 34 |
| David Krejci | 82 | 23 | 31 | 54 | −12 | 26 |
| Patrice Bergeron | 79 | 21 | 32 | 53 | 12 | 24 |
| Torey Krug | 81 | 8 | 43 | 51 | −10 | 37 |
| Ryan Spooner | 78 | 11 | 28 | 39 | −8 | 14 |
| David Backes | 74 | 17 | 21 | 38 | 2 | 69 |
| Zdeno Chara | 75 | 10 | 19 | 29 | 18 | 59 |
| Dominic Moore | 82 | 11 | 14 | 25 | 2 | 44 |
| Frank Vatrano | 44 | 10 | 8 | 18 | −3 | 14 |
| Riley Nash | 81 | 7 | 10 | 17 | −1 | 14 |
| Brandon Carlo | 82 | 6 | 10 | 16 | 9 | 59 |
| Tim Schaller | 59 | 7 | 7 | 14 | −6 | 23 |
| Colin Miller | 61 | 6 | 7 | 13 | 0 | 55 |
| Austin Czarnik | 49 | 5 | 8 | 13 | −10 | 12 |
| Kevan Miller | 58 | 3 | 10 | 13 | 1 | 50 |
| Adam McQuaid | 77 | 2 | 8 | 10 | 4 | 71 |
| Drew Stafford | 18 | 4 | 4 | 8 | 8 | 12 |
| Matt Beleskey | 49 | 3 | 5 | 8 | −10 | 47 |
| Noel Acciari | 29 | 2 | 3 | 5 | 3 | 16 |
| Jimmy Hayes | 58 | 2 | 3 | 5 | −3 | 29 |
| John-Michael Liles | 36 | 0 | 5 | 5 | 1 | 4 |
| Anton Blidh | 19 | 1 | 1 | 2 | −2 | 7 |
| Peter Cehlarik | 11 | 0 | 2 | 2 | 0 | 0 |
| Sean Kuraly | 8 | 0 | 1 | 1 | −1 | 2 |
| Joe Morrow | 17 | 0 | 1 | 1 | −4 | 8 |
| Jakob Forsbacka Karlsson | 1 | 0 | 0 | 0 | 0 | 0 |
| Matt Grzelcyk | 2 | 0 | 0 | 0 | 0 | 2 |
| Danton Heinen | 8 | 0 | 0 | 0 | −3 | 2 |
| Rob O'Gara | 3 | 0 | 0 | 0 | 1 | 0 |

Playoffs
| Player | GP | G | A | Pts | +/− | PIM |
|---|---|---|---|---|---|---|
| Patrice Bergeron | 6 | 2 | 2 | 4 | 2 | 2 |
| David Pastrnak | 6 | 2 | 2 | 4 | 1 | 6 |
| David Backes | 6 | 1 | 3 | 4 | 1 | 6 |
| Charlie McAvoy | 6 | 0 | 3 | 3 | −2 | 2 |
| Sean Kuraly | 4 | 2 | 0 | 2 | 0 | 4 |
| Drew Stafford | 6 | 0 | 2 | 2 | −2 | 2 |
| John-Michael Liles | 6 | 0 | 2 | 2 | 1 | 0 |
| Riley Nash | 6 | 0 | 2 | 2 | 0 | 2 |
| Ryan Spooner | 4 | 0 | 2 | 2 | −2 | 0 |
| Noel Acciari | 4 | 1 | 0 | 1 | 0 | 2 |
| Tim Schaller | 6 | 1 | 0 | 1 | 2 | 2 |
| Frank Vatrano | 6 | 1 | 0 | 1 | −1 | 4 |
| Zdeno Chara | 6 | 0 | 1 | 1 | −3 | 2 |
| Tommy Cross | 1 | 0 | 1 | 1 | 1 | 0 |
| Adam McQuaid | 2 | 0 | 1 | 1 | 0 | 0 |
| Colin Miller | 4 | 0 | 1 | 1 | 1 | 2 |
| Dominic Moore | 6 | 0 | 1 | 1 | 0 | 4 |
| Joe Morrow | 5 | 0 | 1 | 1 | 1 | 2 |
| Matt Beleskey | 3 | 0 | 0 | 0 | −2 | 4 |
| David Krejci | 3 | 0 | 0 | 0 | −1 | 0 |
| Kevan Miller | 6 | 0 | 0 | 0 | 0 | 4 |

=== Goaltenders ===
Regular season
| Player | GP | GS | MIN | W | L | OT | GA | GAA | SA | SV% | SO | G | A | PIM |
|---|---|---|---|---|---|---|---|---|---|---|---|---|---|---|
| Tuukka Rask | 65 | 64 | 3679:30 | 37 | 20 | 5 | 137 | 2.23 | 1,610 | .915 | 8 | 0 | 2 | 0 |
| Anton Khudobin | 16 | 14 | 884:47 | 7 | 6 | 1 | 39 | 2.64 | 405 | .904 | 0 | 0 | 1 | 2 |
| Zane McIntyre | 8 | 3 | 332:37 | 0 | 4 | 1 | 22 | 3.97 | 155 | .858 | 0 | 0 | 0 | 0 |
| Malcolm Subban | 1 | 1 | 30:36 | 0 | 1 | 0 | 3 | 5.88 | 16 | .813 | 0 | 0 | 0 | 0 |

Playoffs
| Player | GP | GS | MIN | W | L | GA | GAA | SA | SV% | SO | G | A | PIM |
|---|---|---|---|---|---|---|---|---|---|---|---|---|---|
| Tuukka Rask | 6 | 6 | 402:21 | 2 | 4 | 15 | 2.24 | 187 | .920 | 0 | 0 | 0 | 0 |

- ^{†}Denotes player spent time with another team before joining Bruins. Stats reflect time with the Bruins only.
- ^{‡}Denotes player was traded mid-season. Stats reflect time with the Bruins only.

== Awards and honours ==
=== Milestones ===
- On November 22, 2016, the Bruins as a team reached the milestone of 20,000 goals all-time in NHL play, dating back to their 1924–25 debut season with Smokey Harris' goal for the Bruins, as the first NHL goal in team history on December 1, 1924. New forward David Backes' power play goal achieved the 20,000 goal milestone for the Bruins on November 22, in a 4–2 home loss to the St. Louis Blues, Backes' former team as the visitors to TD Garden; the 20,000th goal plateau has only been attained by one other NHL team, the Bruins' top rival, the Montreal Canadiens.
- On December 21, 2016, Anton Blidh scored his 1st career NHL goal.

== Transactions ==
The Bruins have been involved in the following transactions during the 2016–17 season:

=== Trades ===
| Date | Details | | Ref |
| June 25, 2016 | To Florida Panthers 7th-round pick in 2016 | To Boston Bruins 7th-round pick in 2017 |
| March 1, 2017 | To Winnipeg Jets conditional 6th-round pick in 2018 | To Boston Bruins Drew Stafford |

=== Free agents acquired ===
| Date | Player | Former team | Contract terms (in U.S. dollars) | Ref |
| July 1, 2016 | David Backes | St. Louis Blues | 5 years, $30 million | |
| July 1, 2016 | Anton Khudobin | Anaheim Ducks | 2 years, $2.4 million | |
| July 1, 2016 | Riley Nash | Carolina Hurricanes | 2 years, $1.8 million | |
| July 1, 2016 | Tim Schaller | Buffalo Sabres | 1 year, $600,000 | |
| August 30, 2016 | Dominic Moore | New York Rangers | 1 year, $900,000 | |
| August 30, 2016 | Alex Grant | Arizona Coyotes | 1 year, $600,000 | |

=== Free agents lost ===
| Date | Player | New team | Contract terms (in U.S. dollars) | Ref |
| July 1, 2016 | Jonas Gustavsson | Edmonton Oilers | 1 year, $800,000 | |
| July 1, 2016 | Zach Trotman | Los Angeles Kings | 1 year, $650,000 | |
| July 1, 2016 | Loui Eriksson | Vancouver Canucks | 6 years, $36 million | |
| July 1, 2016 | Matt Irwin | Nashville Predators | 1 year, $575,000 | |
| July 1, 2016 | Lee Stempniak | Carolina Hurricanes | 2 years, $5 million | |
| July 1, 2016 | Brett Connolly | Washington Capitals | 1 year, $850,000 | |
| July 7, 2016 | Chris Kelly | Ottawa Senators | 1-year, $900,000 | |
| July 9, 2016 | Landon Ferraro | St. Louis Blues | 1 year, $700,000 | |
| September 28, 2016 | Dennis Seidenberg | New York Islanders | 1 year, $1 million | |

=== Claimed via waivers ===
| Player | Previous team | Date |

=== Lost via waivers ===
| Player | New team | Date | Ref |
|---|---|---|---|
| Seth Griffith | Toronto Maple Leafs | October 11, 2016 | |

=== Player signings ===
| Date | Player | Contract terms (in U.S. dollars) | Ref |
| June 30, 2016 | Torey Krug | 4 years, $21 million | |
| July 1, 2016 | Tommy Cross | 1 year, $600,000 | |
| July 1, 2016 | John-Michael Liles | 1 year, $2 million | |
| July 1, 2016 | Tyler Randell | 1 year, $600,000 | |
| July 14, 2016 | Colin Miller | 2 years, $2 million | |
| July 14, 2016 | Joe Morrow | 1 year, $800,000 | |
| August 30, 2016 | Chris Casto | 1 year, $650,000 | |
| August 30, 2016 | Brian Ferlin | 1 year, $725,000 | |
| September 26, 2016 | Brad Marchand | 8 years, $49 million contract extension | |
| December 11, 2016 | Jesse Gabrielle | 3 years, $2.775 million entry-level contract | |
| March 24, 2017 | Ryan Fitzgerald | 2 years, entry-level contract | |
| March 24, 2017 | Emil Johansson | 3 years, $2.775 million entry-level contract | |
| April 2, 2017 | Jakob Forsbacka Karlsson | 3 years, $2.775 million entry-level contract | |
| April 10, 2017 | Charlie McAvoy | 3 years, $3.775 million entry-level contract | |
| April 13, 2017 | Joona Koppanen | 3 years, $2.775 million entry-level contract | |
| May 30, 2017 | Anders Bjork | 3 years, $3.2 million entry-level contract | |
| June 14, 2017 | Tommy Cross | 1 year, $650,000 contract extension | |

== Draft picks ==
Below are the Boston Bruins' selections at the 2016 NHL entry draft, to be held on June 24–25, 2016 at the First Niagara Center in Buffalo, New York.

| Round | # | Player | Pos | Nationality | College/Junior/Club team (League) |
|---|---|---|---|---|---|
| 1 | 14 | Charlie McAvoy | D | United States | Boston University (Hockey East) |
| 1 | 29^{[a]} | Trent Frederic | C | United States | U.S. NTDP (USHL) |
| 2 | 49^{[b]} | Ryan Lindgren | D | United States | U.S. NTDP (USHL) |
| 5 | 135 | Joona Koppanen | LW | Finland | Ilves-jr. (FIN-Jr.) |
| 5 | 136^{[c]} | Cameron Clarke | D | Canada | Lone Star Brahmas (NAHL) |
| 6 | 165^{[d]} | Oskar Steen | C | Sweden | Farjestad-jr. (Swe-Jr) |

Notes

- ^{[a]} The San Jose Sharks' first-round pick went to the Boston Bruins as the result of a trade on June 30, 2015, that sent Martin Jones to San Jose in exchange for Sean Kuraly and this pick.
- The Boston Bruins' second-round pick went to the Tampa Bay Lightning as the result of a trade on March 2, 2015, that sent Brett Connolly to Boston in exchange for a second-round pick in 2015 and this pick.
- ^{[b]} The New York Islanders' second-round pick went to the Boston Bruins as the result of a trade on October 4, 2014, that sent Johnny Boychuk to New York in exchange for Philadelphia's second-round pick in 2015, a conditional third-round pick in 2015 and this pick.
- The Boston Bruins' third-round pick went to the Carolina Hurricanes as the result of a trade on February 29, 2016, that sent John-Michael Liles to Boston in exchange for Anthony Camara, a fifth-round pick in 2017 and this pick.
- The Boston Bruins' fourth-round pick went to the New Jersey Devils as the result of a trade on February 29, 2016, that sent Lee Stempniak to Boston in exchange for a second-round pick in 2017 and this pick.
- ^{[c]} The Minnesota Wild's fifth-round pick went to the Boston Bruins as the result of a trade on June 27, 2015, that sent a fifth-round pick in 2015 to Minnesota in exchange for this pick.
- ^{[d]} The Boston Bruins' sixth-round pick was re-acquired as the result of a trade on June 25, 2015, that sent Carl Soderberg to Colorado in exchange for this pick.

Colorado previously acquired this pick as the result of a trade on March 2, 2015, that sent Max Talbot and Paul Carey to Boston in exchange for Jordan Caron and this pick.

- The Boston Bruins' seventh-round pick went to the Florida Panthers as the result of a trade on June 25, 2016, that sent a seventh-round pick in 2017 to Boston in exchange for this pick.
