= 2016–17 Colorado Avalanche season =

National Hockey League team season

2016–17 Colorado Avalanche
- Division: 7th Central
- Conference: 14th Western
- 2016–17 record: 22–56–4
- Home record: 13–26–2
- Road record: 9–30–2
- Goals for: 166
- Goals against: 278

Team information
- General manager: Joe Sakic
- Coach: Jared Bednar
- Captain: Gabriel Landeskog
- Alternate captains: Francois Beauchemin; Matt Duchene; Nathan MacKinnon
- Arena: Pepsi Center
- Average attendance: 14,835 (82.4%)
- Minor league affiliates: San Antonio Rampage (AHL); Colorado Eagles (ECHL)

Team leaders
- Goals: Mikko Rantanen (20)
- Assists: Nathan MacKinnon (37)
- Points: Nathan MacKinnon (53)
- Penalty minutes: Nikita Zadorov (73)
- Plus/minus: Sven Andrighetto; J. T. Compher (0)
- Wins: Calvin Pickard (15)
- Goals against average: Calvin Pickard (2.98)

The 2016–17 Colorado Avalanche season was the 22nd operational season and 21st playing season for the Colorado Avalanche since the franchise relocated from Quebec prior to the start of the 1995–96 NHL season, as well as the franchise's 38th season in the National Hockey League and 45th season overall.

Under first-year head coach Jared Bednar, the Avalanche got off to a respectable start, and were only two games below .500 by December 1. However, they won a total of four games in December and January combined. By the All-Star Break, they were 13-31-2, and their season was all but finished. They won only nine more games after that to finish 22-56-4, the worst record in the NHL. They missed the playoffs for the third consecutive year, 46 points behind the lowest playoff seed and 21 points behind the 29th-place Vancouver Canucks. It was the franchise's lowest points total since 1990–91 as the Nordiques, which was the last time the franchise finished in last place overall. The Avalanche's 48 points were among the fewest for a non-expansion team since 1967, and the second fewest for any team playing an 82-game season where one point is earned for losing in overtime or a shootout, ahead of only the 2023–24 San Jose Sharks (who finished with 47 points). The team was shutout a franchise record-tying 12 times (set during the 2008-09 season). Despite their historically poor season, as of the 2025–26 NHL season, this is the most recent time the Avalanche have missed the playoffs.

== Off-season ==
On August 11, 2016, less than a month before training camp, Patrick Roy resigned as head coach, claiming he had little input in personnel matters despite having the additional title of vice president of hockey operations. On August 25, the Avalanche hired Jared Bednar of the American Hockey League's Cleveland Monsters as Roy's replacement. He had led the Monsters to winning the AHL championship in the previous season. The unusually late hire left Bednar with little time to get to know the players, and no time at all to install his own system. With nowhere near enough time to assemble his own staff, he was forced to retain Roy's assistants.

== Standings ==
Central Division
Pos	Team	GP	W	L	OTL	ROW	GF	GA	GD	Pts
1	z – Chicago Blackhawks	82	50	23	9	46	244	213	+31	109
2	x – Minnesota Wild	82	49	25	8	46	266	208	+58	106
3	x – St. Louis Blues	82	46	29	7	44	235	218	+17	99
4	x – Nashville Predators	82	41	29	12	39	240	224	+16	94
5	Winnipeg Jets	82	40	35	7	37	249	256	−7	87
6	Dallas Stars	82	34	37	11	33	223	262	−39	79
7	Colorado Avalanche	82	22	56	4	21	166	278	−112	48

Source: National Hockey League
x – Clinched playoff spot; z – Clinched conference

Western Conference Wild Card
Pos	Div	Team	GP	W	L	OTL	ROW	GF	GA	GD	Pts
1	PA	x – Calgary Flames	82	45	33	4	41	226	221	+5	94
2	CE	x – Nashville Predators	82	41	29	12	39	240	224	+16	94
3	CE	Winnipeg Jets	82	40	35	7	37	249	256	−7	87
4	PA	Los Angeles Kings	82	39	35	8	37	201	205	−4	86
5	CE	Dallas Stars	82	34	37	11	33	223	262	−39	79
6	PA	Arizona Coyotes	82	30	42	10	24	197	260	−63	70
7	PA	Vancouver Canucks	82	30	43	9	26	182	243	−61	69
8	CE	Colorado Avalanche	82	22	56	4	21	166	278	−112	48

Source: National Hockey League
x – Clinched playoff spot

== Schedule and results ==
=== Pre-season ===
Pre-season Game Log: 6–0–0 (Home: 3–0–0; Road: 3–0–0)
#	Date	Visitor	Score	Home	OT	Decision	Attendance	Record	Recap
1	September 27	Colorado	4–1	Minnesota		Smith	16,920	1–0–0	Recap
2	September 28	Dallas	2–4	Colorado		Simpson	—	2–0–0	Recap
3	September 30	Los Angeles	1–3	Colorado		Varlamov	—	3–0–0	Recap
4	October 4	Minnesota	0–2	Colorado		Varlamov	—	4–0–0	Recap
5	October 5	Colorado	1–0	Dallas		Pickard	14,120	5–0–0	Recap
6^{[a]}	October 8	Colorado	2–1	Los Angeles	OT	—	—	6–0–0	Recap
Notes:^{a} Game played at T-Mobile Arena in Paradise, Nevada.

=== Regular season ===
Game Log

October: 4–3–0 (Home: 1–1–0; Road: 3–2–0)
#	Date	Visitor	Score	Home	OT	Decision	Attendance	Record	Pts	Recap
1	October 15	Dallas	5–6	Colorado		Varlamov	18,007	1–0–0	2	Recap
2	October 17	Colorado	4–3	Pittsburgh	OT	Pickard	18,431	2–0–0	4	Recap
3	October 18	Colorado	0–3	Washington		Varlamov	18,506	2–1–0	4	Recap
4	October 20	Colorado	4–0	Tampa Bay		Varlamov	19,092	3–1–0	6	Recap
5	October 22	Colorado	2–5	Florida		Varlamov	14,326	3–2–0	6	Recap
6	October 28	Winnipeg	1–0	Colorado		Varlamov	16,135	3–3–0	6	Recap
7	October 29	Colorado	3–2	Arizona		Pickard	13,533	4–3–0	8	Recap

November: 5–8–1 (Home: 3–5–1; Road: 2–3–0)
#	Date	Visitor	Score	Home	OT	Decision	Attendance	Record	Pts	Recap
8	November 1	Nashville	5–1	Colorado		Varlamov	12,142	4–4–0	8	Recap
9	November 3	Colorado	0–4	Chicago		Varlamov	21,580	4–5–0	8	Recap
10	November 5	Minnesota	0–1	Colorado		Pickard	16,256	5–5–0	10	Recap
11	November 6	Colorado	1–5	St. Louis		Varlamov	17,220	5–6–0	10	Recap
12	November 8	Arizona	4–2	Colorado		Pickard	13,858	5–7–0	10	Recap
13	November 11	Winnipeg	2–3	Colorado	OT	Varlamov	16,517	6–7–0	12	Recap
14	November 13	Boston	2–0	Colorado		Varlamov	15,808	6–8–0	12	Recap
15	November 15	Los Angeles	1–4	Colorado		Varlamov	14,805	7–8–0	14	Recap
16	November 17	Colorado	2–3	Dallas		Varlamov	18,237	7–9–0	14	Recap
17	November 19	Colorado	3–2	Minnesota		Pickard	19,238	8–9–0	16	Recap
18	November 21	Colorado	3–2	Columbus	OT	Varlamov	10,063	9–9–0	18	Recap
19	November 23	Edmonton	6–3	Colorado		Varlamov	15,185	9–10–0	18	Recap
20	November 26	Vancouver	3–2	Colorado	SO	Pickard	15,511	9–10–1	19	Recap
21	November 29	Nashville	5–3	Colorado		Pickard	12,082	9–11–1	19	Recap

December: 3–12–0 (Home: 0–7–0; Road: 3–5–0)
#	Date	Visitor	Score	Home	OT	Decision	Attendance	Record	Pts	Recap
22	December 1	Columbus	3–2	Colorado		Varlamov	12,141	9–12–1	19	Recap
23	December 3	Dallas	3–0	Colorado		Varlamov	16,725	9–13–1	19	Recap
24	December 6	Colorado	3–4	Nashville		Varlamov	17,113	9–14–1	19	Recap
25	December 8	Colorado	4–2	Boston		Pickard	17,565	10–14–1	21	Recap
26	December 10	Colorado	1–10	Montreal		Pickard	21,288	10–15–1	21	Recap
27	December 11	Colorado	3–1	Toronto		Varlamov	18,875	11–15–1	23	Recap
28	December 14	Philadelphia	4–3	Colorado		Pickard	14,456	11–16–1	23	Recap
29	December 16	Florida	3–1	Colorado		Pickard	14,679	11–17–1	23	Recap
30	December 18	Colorado	1–4	Winnipeg		Pickard	15,294	11–18–1	23	Recap
31	December 20	Colorado	0–2	Minnesota		Varlamov	19,018	11–19–1	23	Recap
32	December 22	Toronto	6–0	Colorado		Varlamov	15,502	11–20–1	23	Recap
33	December 23	Colorado	2–1	Chicago	OT	Pickard	21,918	12–20–1	25	Recap
34	December 27	Calgary	6–3	Colorado		Pickard	14,634	12–21–1	25	Recap
35	December 29	Colorado	2–4	Dallas		Pickard	18,532	12–22–1	25	Recap
36	December 31	NY Rangers	6–2	Colorado		Pickard	17,609	12–23–1	25	Recap

January: 1–9–1 (Home: 1–5–0; Road: 0–4–1)
#	Date	Visitor	Score	Home	OT	Decision	Attendance	Record	Pts	Recap
37	January 2	Colorado	2–3	Vancouver		Pickard	18,865	12–24–1	25	Recap
38	January 4	Colorado	1–4	Calgary		Pickard	18,388	12–25–1	25	Recap
39	January 6	NY Islanders	1–2	Colorado	OT	Pickard	14,788	13–25–1	27	Recap
40	January 12	Anaheim	4–1	Colorado		Varlamov	14,589	13–26–1	27	Recap
41	January 14	Nashville	3–2	Colorado		Varlamov	16,096	13–27–1	27	Recap
42	January 17	Chicago	6–4	Colorado		Varlamov	18,007	13–28–1	27	Recap
43	January 19	Colorado	1–2	Anaheim		Pickard	15,414	13–29–1	27	Recap
44	January 21	Colorado	2–3	San Jose	OT	Martin	17,562	13–29–2	28	Recap
45	January 23	San Jose	5–2	Colorado		Martin	13,803	13–30–2	28	Recap
46	January 25	Vancouver	3–2	Colorado		Pickard	12,819	13–31–2	28	Recap
January 27–29		All-Star Break in Los Angeles
47	January 31	Colorado	1–5	Anaheim		Pickard	15,963	13–32–2	28	Recap

February: 4–9–1 (Home: 3–2–1; Road: 1–7–0)
#	Date	Visitor	Score	Home	OT	Decision	Attendance	Record	Pts	Recap
48	February 1	Colorado	0–5	Los Angeles		Martin	18,230	13–33–2	28	Recap
49	February 4	Winnipeg	2–5	Colorado		Pickard	13,930	14–33–2	30	Recap
50	February 7	Montreal	0–4	Colorado		Pickard	12,667	15–33–2	32	Recap
51	February 9	Pittsburgh	4–1	Colorado		Pickard	16,777	15–34–2	32	Recap
52	February 11	Colorado	2–4	NY Rangers		Pickard	18,006	15–35–2	32	Recap
53	February 12	Colorado	1–5	NY Islanders		Pickard	14,107	15–36–2	32	Recap
54	February 14	Colorado	2–3	New Jersey		Smith	12,462	15–37–2	32	Recap
55	February 16	Colorado	0–2	Buffalo		Pickard	18,335	15–38–2	32	Recap
56	February 17	Colorado	2–1	Carolina	OT	Pickard	11,456	16–38–2	34	Recap
57	February 19	Tampa Bay	3–2	Colorado	OT	Pickard	17,270	16–38–3	35	Recap
58	February 21	Los Angeles	2–1	Colorado		Pickard	13,768	16–39–3	35	Recap
59	February 23	Colorado	2–4	Nashville		Smith	17,243	16–40–3	35	Recap
60	February 25	Buffalo	3–5	Colorado		Smith	15,362	17–40–3	37	Recap
61	February 28	Colorado	0–4	Philadelphia		Smith	19,564	17–41–3	37	Recap

March: 4–12–0 (Home: 4–5–0; Road: 0–7–0)
#	Date	Visitor	Score	Home	OT	Decision	Attendance	Record	Pts	Recap
62	March 2	Colorado	1–2	Ottawa		Pickard	16,932	17–42–3	37	Recap
63	March 4	Colorado	1–6	Winnipeg		Pickard	15,294	17–43–3	37	Recap
64	March 5	St. Louis	3–0	Colorado		Smith	14,477	17–44–3	37	Recap
65	March 7	Carolina	1–3	Colorado		Pickard	11,700	18–44–3	39	Recap
66	March 9	New Jersey	2–3	Colorado		Pickard	11,886	19–44–3	41	Recap
67	March 11	Ottawa	4–2	Colorado		Pickard	15,317	19–45–3	41	Recap
68	March 13	Colorado	0–1	Arizona		Pickard	11,521	19–46–3	41	Recap
69	March 15	Detroit	1–3	Colorado		Pickard	16,764	20–46–3	43	Recap
70	March 18	Colorado	1–5	Detroit		Pickard	20,027	20–47–3	43	Recap
71	March 19	Colorado	3–6	Chicago		Smith	22,070	20–48–3	43	Recap
72	March 21	St. Louis	4–2	Colorado		Pickard	11,687	20–49–3	43	Recap
73	March 23	Edmonton	7–4	Colorado		Smith	14,142	20–50–3	43	Recap
74	March 25	Colorado	1–4	Edmonton		Pickard	18,347	20–51–3	43	Recap
75	March 27	Colorado	2–4	Calgary		Pickard	17,785	20–52–3	43	Recap
76	March 29	Washington	5–3	Colorado		Pickard	13,820	20–53–3	43	Recap
77	March 31	St. Louis	1–2	Colorado	SO	Pickard	14,763	21–53–3	45	Recap

April: 1–3–1 (Home: 1–1–0; Road: 0–2–1)
#	Date	Visitor	Score	Home	OT	Decision	Attendance	Record	Pts	Recap
78	April 2	Colorado	2–5	Minnesota		Pickard	19,164	21–54–3	45	Recap
79	April 4	Chicago	3–4	Colorado	OT	Pickard	16,203	22–54–3	47	Recap
80	April 6	Minnesota	4–3	Colorado		Pickard	15,565	22–55–3	47	Recap
81	April 8	Colorado	3–4	Dallas	SO	Smith	18,532	22–55–4	48	Recap
82	April 9	Colorado	2–3	St. Louis		Pickard	18,971	22–56–4	48	Recap

Legend: Win (2 points) Loss (0 points) Overtime/shootout loss (1 point)

== Player stats ==
=== Skaters ===
Regular season
Player	GP	G	A	Pts	+/−	PIM
Nathan MacKinnon	82	16	37	53	−14	16
Matt Duchene	77	18	23	41	−34	12
Mikko Rantanen	75	20	18	38	−25	22
Tyson Barrie	74	7	31	38	−34	18
Gabriel Landeskog	72	18	15	33	−25	62
Mikhail Grigorenko	75	10	13	23	−14	18
Blake Comeau	77	8	12	20	−19	58
Rene Bourque	65	12	6	18	−19	56
Jarome Iginla^{‡}	61	8	10	18	−21	54
Francois Beauchemin	81	5	13	18	−14	32
Erik Johnson	46	2	15	17	−6	9
Sven Andrighetto^{†}	19	5	11	16	0	8
Carl Soderberg	80	6	8	14	−26	22
Fedor Tyutin	69	1	12	13	−25	38
Patrick Wiercioch	57	4	8	12	−18	23
Matt Nieto^{†}	43	7	4	11	−9	4
Nikita Zadorov	56	0	10	10	−20	73
Mark Barberio^{†}	34	2	7	9	−6	4
Joe Colborne	62	4	4	8	−21	34
Andreas Martinsen^{‡}	55	3	4	7	−10	32
John Mitchell	65	3	4	7	−12	45
J. T. Compher	21	3	2	5	0	4
Cody Goloubef	33	0	5	5	−10	25
Samuel Henley	1	1	0	1	+1	2
Tyson Jost	6	1	0	1	−5	0
Cody McLeod^{‡}	28	1	0	1	−2	52
Rocco Grimaldi	4	0	1	1	−3	2
A. J. Greer	5	0	1	1	−2	4
Eric Gelinas	27	0	1	1	−4	12
Anton Lindholm	12	0	0	0	−8	2
Gabriel Bourque	6	0	0	0	0	0
Ben Smith^{‡}	4	0	0	0	−2	0
Duncan Siemens	3	0	0	0	−2	2

=== Goaltenders ===
Regular season
Player	GP	GS	TOI	W	L	OT	GA	GAA	SA	SV%	SO	G	A	PIM
Calvin Pickard	50	48	2820:16	15	31	2	140	2.98	1461	.904	2	0	2	0
Semyon Varlamov	24	23	1347:47	6	17	0	76	3.38	745	.898	1	0	0	0
Jeremy Smith	10	8	542:43	1	6	1	32	3.54	286	.888	0	0	0	0
Spencer Martin	3	3	179:26	0	2	1	13	4.35	96	.865	0	0	0	0

^{†}Denotes player spent time with another team before joining the Avalanche. Stats reflect time with the Avalanche only.
^{‡}Traded mid-season
Bold/italics denotes franchise record

== Transactions ==
The Colorado Avalanche were involved in the following transactions during the 2016–17 NHL season.

=== Trades ===
Date	Details		Ref
June 25, 2016	To New York Rangers Nick Holden	To Colorado Avalanche 4th-round pick in 2017
November 28, 2016	To Columbus Blue Jackets Ryan Stanton	To Colorado Avalanche Cody Goloubef
January 13, 2017	To Nashville Predators Cody McLeod	To Colorado Avalanche Felix Girard
March 1, 2017	To Los Angeles Kings Jarome Iginla	To Colorado Avalanche conditional 4th-round pick in 2018
March 1, 2017	To Montreal Canadiens Andreas Martinsen	To Colorado Avalanche Sven Andrighetto

=== Free agents acquired ===
Date	Player	Former team	Contract terms (in U.S. dollars)	Ref
July 1, 2016	Patrick Wiercioch	Ottawa Senators	1 year, $800,000	
July 1, 2016	Joe Colborne	Calgary Flames	2 years, $5 million	
July 1, 2016	Fedor Tyutin	Columbus Blue Jackets	1 year, $2 million	
July 1, 2016	Turner Elson	Stockton Heat	1 year, $575,000	
July 1, 2016	Jim O'Brien	Albany Devils	1 year, $600,000	
July 1, 2016	Reid Petryk	San Antonio Rampage	1 year	
July 1, 2016	Mike Sislo	New Jersey Devils	1 year, $600,000	
July 1, 2016	Jeremy Smith	Providence Bruins	1 year	
July 1, 2016	Ryan Stanton	Hershey Bears	1 year, $600,000	
July 1, 2016	Trent Vogelhuber	Lake Erie Monsters	2 years, $1.225 million	
July 1, 2016	Joe Whitney	Bridgeport Sound Tigers	1 year, $600,000	
August 16, 2016	Ben Smith	Toronto Maple Leafs	1 year, $675,000	
October 10, 2016	Gabriel Bourque	Nashville Predators	1 year, $800,000	
October 10, 2016	Rene Bourque	Columbus Blue Jackets	1 year, $650,000	

=== Free agents lost ===
Date	Player	New team	Contract terms (in U.S. dollars)	Ref
July 2, 2016	Nate Guenin	Anaheim Ducks	1 year, $600,000	
July 1, 2016	Mikkel Boedker	San Jose Sharks	4 years, $16 million	
July 1, 2016	Borna Rendulic	Vancouver Canucks	1 year, $575,000	
July 1, 2016	Andrew Bodnarchuk	Dallas Stars	2 years, $1.45 million	
July 1, 2016	Shawn Matthias	Winnipeg Jets	2 years, $4.25 million	
July 1, 2016	Zach Redmond	Montreal Canadiens	2 years, $1.225 million	
July 2, 2016	Andrew Agozzino	St. Louis Blues	1 year, $600,000	
July 28, 2016	Brandon Gormley	New Jersey Devils	1 year, $650,000	
October 13, 2016	Jack Skille	Vancouver Canucks	1 year, $700,000	

=== Claimed via waivers ===
Player	Former team	Date claimed off waivers	Ref
Matt Nieto	San Jose Sharks	January 5, 2017	
Mark Barberio	Montreal Canadiens	February 2, 2017	

=== Lost via waivers ===
Player	New team	Date claimed off waivers	Ref
Ben Smith	Toronto Maple Leafs	October 24, 2016	

=== Lost via retirement ===
Date	Player	Ref

=== Player signings ===
Date	Player	Contract terms (in U.S. dollars)	Ref
June 24, 2016	Andreas Martinsen	1 year, $640,000	
July 1, 2016	A. J. Greer	3 years, entry-level contract	
July 5, 2016	Calvin Pickard	2 years, $2 million	
July 8, 2016	Nathan MacKinnon	7 years, $44.1 million contract extension	
July 20, 2016	Mikhail Grigorenko	1 year, $1.3 million	
July 31, 2016	Tyson Barrie	4 years, $22 million	
March 6, 2016	J. C. Beaudin	3 years, $2.45 million entry-level contract	
March 6, 2016	Nicholas Meloche	3 years, $2.775 million entry-level contract	
March 29, 2017	Tyson Jost	3 years, $5.1125 million entry-level contract	
May 12, 2017	Andrei Mironov	2 years, $1.85 million entry-level	

== Draft picks ==
Below are the Colorado Avalanche's selections at the 2016 NHL entry draft, to be held on June 24–25, 2016 at the First Niagara Center in Buffalo.

Round	#	Player	Pos	Nationality	College/Junior/Club team (League)
1	10	Tyson Jost	C	Canada	Penticton Vees (BCHL)
2	40^{[a]}	Cameron Morrison	LW	Canada	Youngstown Phantoms (USHL)
3	71	Josh Anderson	D	Canada	Prince George Cougars (WHL)
5	131	Adam Werner	G	Sweden	Farjestad BK (SHL)
6	161	Nathan Clurman	D	United States	Culver Eagles (US-IN HS)
7	191	Travis Barron	LW	Canada	Ottawa 67's (OHL)

Draft notes

- ^{[a]} The Colorado Avalanche's second-round pick was re-acquired as the result of a trade on June 27, 2015 that sent Buffalo's second-round pick in 2015 to San Jose in exchange for a second-round pick in 2015, Colorado's sixth-round pick in 2017 and this pick.

San Jose previously acquired this pick as the result of a trade on July 1, 2014 that sent Brad Stuart to Colorado in exchange for a sixth-round pick in 2017 and this pick.

- The Colorado Avalanche's fourth-round pick went to the Toronto Maple Leafs as the result of a trade on February 21, 2016 that sent Shawn Matthias to Colorado in exchange for Colin Smith and this pick.
