= Jhonas Enroth =

Swedish ice hockey player (born 1988)

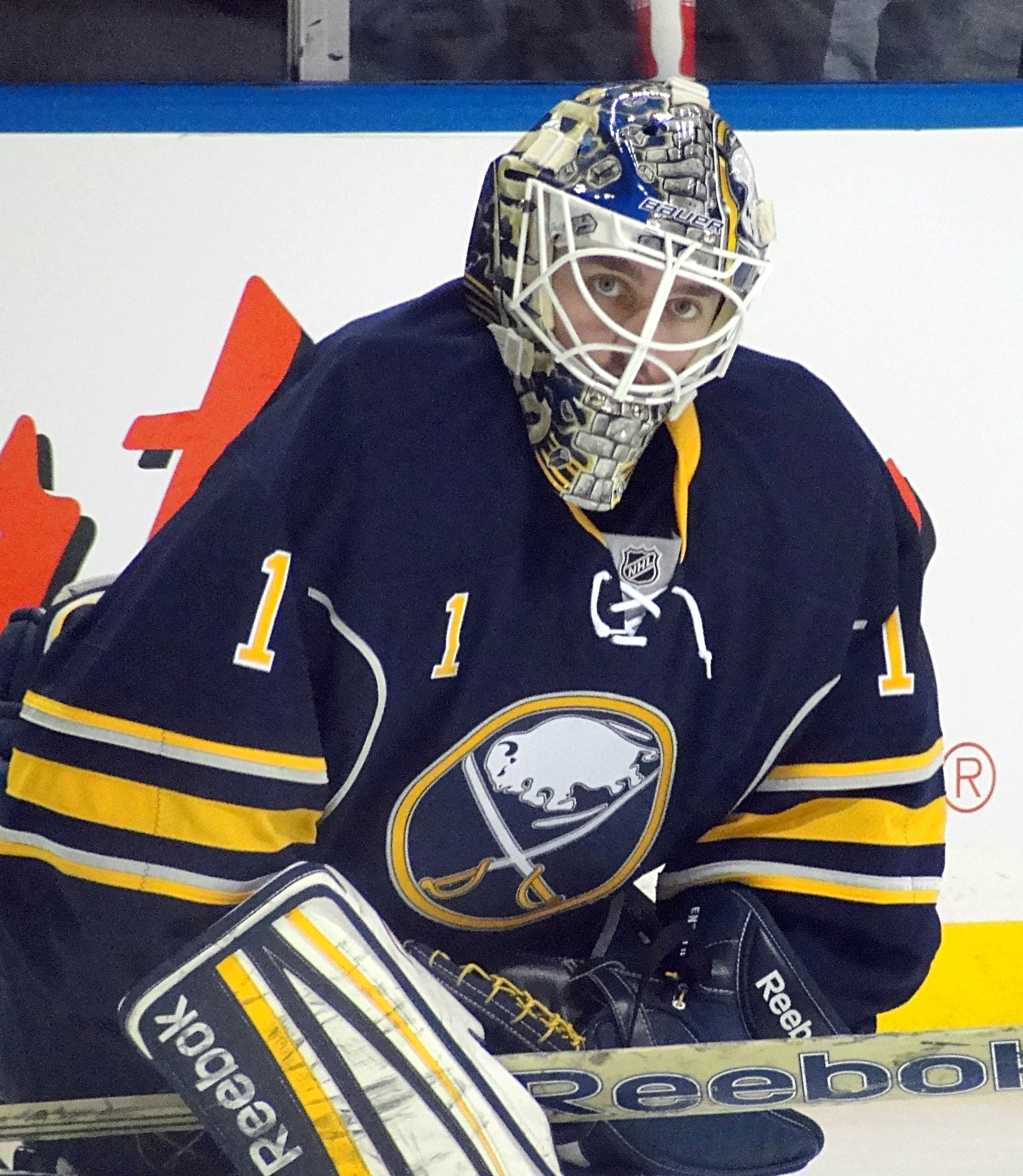
- Enroth with the Buffalo Sabres in 2012
- Born: 25 June 1988 (age 38) Stockholm, Sweden
- Height: 180 cm (5 ft 11 in)
- Weight: 78 kg (172 lb; 12 st 4 lb)
- Position: Goaltender
- Catches: Left
- SHL team Former teams: Örebro HK; Södertälje SK; Buffalo Sabres; Dallas Stars; Los Angeles Kings; Toronto Maple Leafs; Dinamo Minsk; EC KAC
- National team: Sweden
- NHL draft: 46th overall, 2006; Buffalo Sabres
- Playing career: 2007–present

Jhonas Erik Enroth (born 25 June 1988), is a Swedish professional ice hockey goaltender, who is currently playing with Örebro HK of the Swedish Hockey League (SHL). He played in the National Hockey League (NHL) for the Buffalo Sabres, Dallas Stars, Los Angeles Kings and Toronto Maple Leafs between 2009 and 2016. Internationally Enroth has played for the Swedish national team in several tournaments, including three World Championships, winning a gold medal in 2013 and the 2018 Winter Olympics.

== Playing career ==
Enroth was selected on 24 June 2006, by the Buffalo Sabres as their second draft choice (46th overall), in the second round of the 2006 NHL entry draft.

In 2007, he was named as the first of four candidates for Elitserien 2008 Rookie of the Year. The award was won by another goaltender, Daniel Larsson. He ended the 2007–08 regular season in Sweden as the leading goaltender in save percentage and goals against average. On 31 May 2008, Enroth signed a three-year level entry contract with the Buffalo Sabres in the NHL. He also was the top European goaltender in the 2006 NHL entry draft. He had his first NHL pre-season appearance on 22 September, playing the second half of the game for the Buffalo Sabres.

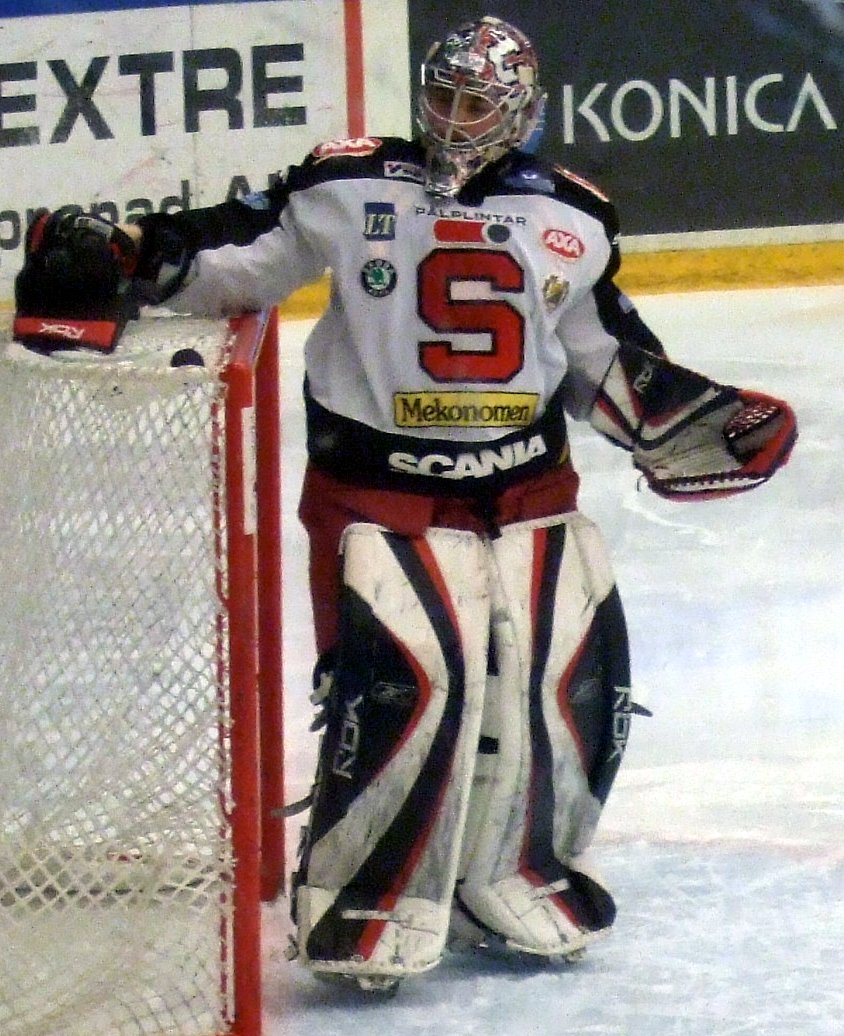
Enroth with Södertälje SK in 2008

On 22 February 2009, he was recalled to Buffalo from the Portland Pirates before he was returned to the Pirates without featuring in a game. On 4 November 2009, he was recalled again to Buffalo. Enroth made his NHL debut against the Boston Bruins 7 November 2009 in a losing effort, giving up four goals. He did not get another chance at the NHL level until 3 November 2010 of the 2010–11 NHL season, when he played 20 minutes of an away game against the Boston Bruins, allowing three goals on just twelve shots to record his second NHL loss.

Enroth recorded his first NHL victory in a shootout over the Toronto Maple Leafs by the score of 3–2 on 6 November 2010 in Toronto; his second NHL victory also came in a shootout against the New Jersey Devils on 10 November 2010. His third NHL victory came in a ten-round shootout against the Montreal Canadiens on 15 February 2011, which, in winning, he became the first goaltender in NHL history to record all three of his first wins in shootouts.

Enroth earned his first NHL shutout on 30 March 2011 against the New York Rangers stopping 23 shots. On 4 April 2011, Enroth was named one of NHL's three stars for the week ending 3 April. On 26 April 2011, Enroth appeared in his first NHL playoff game, relieving Ryan Miller. His debut saw the majority of the third period, allowing one goal in eight shots against. Enroth was named to the 2011–12 All-Rookie Team during the NHL Awards on 20 June 2012. He was the sixth player in Sabres franchise history to be named to the All-Rookie Team.

During the 2012–13 NHL Lockout Enroth remained in Sweden. He first practiced with his original club Huddinge IK and played two games with them in the Hockeyettan. He then signed with Almtuna IS from Uppsala just north of Stockholm, in the second-tier league, and played there until the NHL season started.

On 20 June 2013, Enroth signed a two-year deal to remain with the Sabres. Enroth was promoted to starting goaltender on 28 February 2014, after the Sabres traded Ryan Miller, their previous starting goaltender, to the St. Louis Blues.

On 11 February 2015, Enroth was traded by the Sabres, to the Dallas Stars in exchange for Anders Lindbäck and a conditional 3rd-round draft pick.

On 1 July 2015, Enroth signed a one-year contract to assume the backup position to Jonathan Quick on the Los Angeles Kings. Enroth recorded impressive statistics in his limited role with the club but admitted once the season ended that he was disappointed with his lack of playing time, having dressed for only 16 contests.

On 22 August 2016, Enroth signed as a free agent to a one-year contract with the Toronto Maple Leafs, to back up Frederik Andersen following the trade of Jonathan Bernier a month prior. Though he was expected to play more games than he did with the Kings, Enroth struggled with the Maple Leafs, going winless in his six appearances and only starting in four of those games. With Andersen excelling, Entroth was waived on 5 December 2016 to be sent to the Toronto Marlies. He cleared the following day. The next month would only see Enroth appear in three games with the Marlies (two of them in relief) due to a crowded crease. Following the Maple Leafs' acquisition of Curtis McElhinney via waivers on 10 January 2017, Enroth was traded to the Anaheim Ducks in exchange for a seventh-round pick in 2018 at 1 AM (EST) on 11 January.

As a free agent from the Ducks, Enroth, with limited opportunity to extend his NHL career, opted to sign abroad in agreeing to a one-year deal with Belarusian club, HC Dinamo Minsk of the Kontinental Hockey League (KHL), on 13 July 2017.

In the 2018–19 season, playing in his second season with Dinamo and in last year of his contract, Enroth appeared in 52 games for club, sporting a 2.60 goal against average, however was unable to propel Dinamo to the playoffs. On 15 February 2019, Enroth left Minsk to join Swedish club, Örebro HK of the SHL, for the remainder of the season.

On 2 July 2019, Enroth returned to Dinamo Minsk of the KHL, signing a one-year contract. In the 2019–20 season, Enroth collected just 7 wins in 30 games for the bottom placed Dinamo Minsk. With the KHL regular season nearing conclusion, Enroth left Dinamo to join Austrian club, EC KAC of the EBEL, for the remainder of the season on 14 February 2020.

== International play ==
Medal record

Representing Sweden

Ice hockey

Olympic Games
Silver medal – second place	2014 Sochi	

World Championships
Gold medal – first place	2013 Sweden/Finland	

World Junior Championships
Silver medal – second place	2008 Czech Republic	

IIHF World U18 Championships
Bronze medal – third place	2005 Czech Republic	

Enroth first played at the international junior level with Sweden at the 2005 IIHF World U18 Championships, helping capture the bronze medal. He appeared in 16 games at the junior level at the Under 18 level and World Junior Championships.

Enroth made his senior debut with the Swedish National Team appearing in 2 games at the 2012 World Championships. With the Sabres outside the Stanley Cup playoffs, following the shortened 2012–13 season, the door was open for the Tre Kronor, and he went on to play in the World Championships, where Sweden broke a 27-year-old curse and won the gold medal. It marked the first time since 1986 a hosting nation won the title. Enroth was highly acclaimed for his efforts and was selected in the All Star Team of the tournament.

He was selected to the Swedish squad as the team's third choice goaltender at the 2014 Winter Olympics in Sochi. He did not feature in a game, as Sweden claimed the silver medal.

== Career statistics ==
=== Regular season and playoffs ===
			Regular season									Playoffs
Season	Team	League	GP	W	L	T/OT	MIN	GA	SO	GAA	SV%	GP	W	L	MIN	GA	SO	GAA	SV%
2004–05	Huddinge IK	J20	19	—	—	—	1144	—	—	2.57	.905	3	—	—	186	—	—	1.93	.942
2004–05	Huddinge IK	Allsv	2	0	0	0	52	6	0	6.95	.786	—	—	—	—	—	—	—	—
2005–06	Södertälje SK	J20	39	—	—	—	2379	—	—	2.17	.922	4	—	—	243	—	—	2.22	.914
2006–07	Södertälje SK	J20	3	—	—	—	179	—	—	1.33	.956	—	—	—	—	—	—	—	—
2006–07	Södertälje SK	Allsv	24	19	2	2	1378	37	3	1.61	.937	9	6	3	560	20	0	2.14	.921
2007–08	Södertälje SK	J20	1	—	—	—	59	—	—	4.05	.840	—	—	—	—	—	—	—	—
2007–08	Södertälje SK	SEL	27	9	14	3	1578	56	2	2.13	.932	—	—	—	—	—	—	—	—
2008–09	Portland Pirates	AHL	58	26	23	6	3424	157	3	2.75	.914	5	1	4	264	10	1	2.27	.904
2009–10	Portland Pirates	AHL	48	28	18	1	1240	110	5	2.37	.919	—	—	—	—	—	—	—	—
2009–10	Buffalo Sabres	NHL	1	0	1	0	58	4	0	4.12	.892	—	—	—	—	—	—	—	—
2010–11	Portland Pirates	AHL	41	20	17	2	2393	111	0	2.78	.912	4	1	2	217	10	0	2.77	.912
2010–11	Buffalo Sabres	NHL	14	9	2	2	769	35	1	2.73	.907	1	0	0	17	1	0	3.53	.875
2011–12	Buffalo Sabres	NHL	26	8	11	4	1399	63	1	2.70	.917	—	—	—	—	—	—	—	—
2012–13	Huddinge IK	Div.1	2	2	0	0	120	5	0	2.50	.889	—	—	—	—	—	—	—	—
2012–13	Almtuna IS	Allsv	14	5	9	0	832	32	2	2.31	.917	—	—	—	—	—	—	—	—
2012–13	Buffalo Sabres	NHL	12	4	4	1	623	27	1	2.60	.919	—	—	—	—	—	—	—	—
2013–14	Buffalo Sabres	NHL	28	4	17	5	1574	74	0	2.82	.911	—	—	—	—	—	—	—	—
2014–15	Buffalo Sabres	NHL	37	13	21	2	2204	120	1	3.27	.903	—	—	—	—	—	—	—	—
2014–15	Dallas Stars	NHL	13	5	5	0	630	25	1	2.38	.906	—	—	—	—	—	—	—	—
2015–16	Los Angeles Kings	NHL	16	7	5	1	857	31	2	2.17	.922	—	—	—	—	—	—	—	—
2016–17	Toronto Maple Leafs	NHL	6	0	3	1	275	18	0	3.94	.872	—	—	—	—	—	—	—	—
2016–17	Toronto Marlies	AHL	3	2	1	0	178	9	0	3.03	.904	—	—	—	—	—	—	—	—
2016–17	San Diego Gulls	AHL	18	14	4	0	1077	31	2	1.73	.936	10	4	6	580	26	0	2.69	.924
2017–18	Dinamo Minsk	KHL	52	19	27	5	3032	104	4	2.06	.923	—	—	—	—	—	—	—	—
2018–19	Dinamo Minsk	KHL	52	13	34	3	2905	126	1	2.60	.914	—	—	—	—	—	—	—	—
2018–19	Örebro HK	SHL	10	6	4	0	606	19	0	1.88	.927	2	0	2	123	7	0	3.42	.873
2019–20	Dinamo Minsk	KHL	30	7	17	6	1726	90	2	3.13	.891	—	—	—	—	—	—	—	—
2019–20	EC KAC	EBEL	3	1	2	0	180	6	0	2.00	.932	—	—	—	—	—	—	—	—
2020–21	Örebro HK	SHL	32	19	13	0	1928	78	3	2.43	.909	8	5	3	507	11	1	1.30	.950
2021–22	Örebro HK	SHL	42	25	16	0	2486	83	6	2.00	.923	8	3	5	504	18	0	2.14	.913
2022–23	Örebro HK	SHL	37	22	15	0	2238	93	2	2.49	.905	12	5	7	762	27	0	2.13	.923
2023–24	Örebro HK	SHL	33	13	18	0	1875	83	0	2.66	.896	—	—	—	—	—	—	—	—
2024–25	Örebro HK	SHL	26	15	10	0	1552	60	3	2.32	.903	1	0	1	69	4	0	3.50	.875
NHL totals			153	50	69	16	8,389	397	7	2.84	.909	1	0	0	17	1	0	3.53	.875

=== International ===
Year	Team	Event	GP	W	L	T	MIN	GA	SO	GAA	SV%
2005	Sweden	U18	3	2	1	0	141	4	0	1.70	.942
2006	Sweden	U18	5	3	1	1	298	9	0	1.81	.943
2007	Sweden	WJC	3	2	1	0	144	7	0	2.91	.887
2008	Sweden	WJC	5	4	1	0	309	12	0	2.33	.905
2012	Sweden	WC	2	2	0	0	120	5	0	2.50	.868
2013	Sweden	WC	7	6	1	0	418	8	2	1.15	.956
2015	Sweden	WC	6	4	0	0	330	15	0	2.72	.876
2018	Sweden	OG	1	1	0	0	60	0	1	0.00	1.000
Junior totals			16	11	4	1	892	32	0	2.15	—
Senior totals			16	13	1	0	928	28	3	1.75	—

== Awards and honours ==
Award	Year
J20
South Best GAA (1.83)	2006
South Best SVS% (.930)	2006
Allsvenskan
Best SVS% (.937)	2007
SHL
Best GAA (2.13)	2008
Best SVS% (.932)	2008
SHL Rookie of the Year (Nominee)	2008
Best SVS%% (.923)	2021
SHL Goaltender of the Year	2021
Honken Trophy	2021
NHL
NHL All-Rookie Team	2012
International
WC All-Star Team	2013
WC Best Goaltender	2013
