= James Marcou =

American ice hockey player (born 1988)

- Born: February 19, 1988 (age 38) Huntington, NY, USA
- Height: 5 ft 7 in (170 cm)
- Weight: 155 lb (70 kg; 11 st 1 lb)
- Position: Forward
- Shoots: Right
- NHL team (P) Cur. team: San Jose Sharks; Worcester Sharks (AHL)
- NHL draft: undrafted
- Playing career: 2010–present
- Coaching career

Current position
- Title: Assistant coach
- Team: Harvard
- Conference: ECAC Hockey

Biographical details
- Education: UMass

Coaching career (HC unless noted)
- 2015–2016: Milton Academy (assistant)
- 2016–2018: UMass (assistant)
- 2018–2019: Brown (assistant)
- 2019–Present: Harvard (assistant)

James Marcou (born February 19, 1988) is an American professional ice hockey player who is currently playing for the Worcester Sharks in the American Hockey League. On March 23, 2010, he was signed as a free agent by the San Jose Sharks who assigned him to their AHL affiliate, the Worcester Sharks, for the remainder of the 2009–10 AHL season.

== Awards and honors ==
Award	Year
USHL Second All-Star team	2007
All-Hockey East Rookie Team	2007–08
All-Hockey East First Team	2008–09
AHCA East Second-Team All-American	2008–09
All-Hockey East Second Team	2009–10

Awards and achievements
Preceded by Bryan Ewing	Hockey East Scoring Champion; 2008–09; With: Colin Wilson	Succeeded by Bobby Butler / Gustav Nyquist
