= Gustav Nyquist =

Swedish ice hockey player (born 1989)

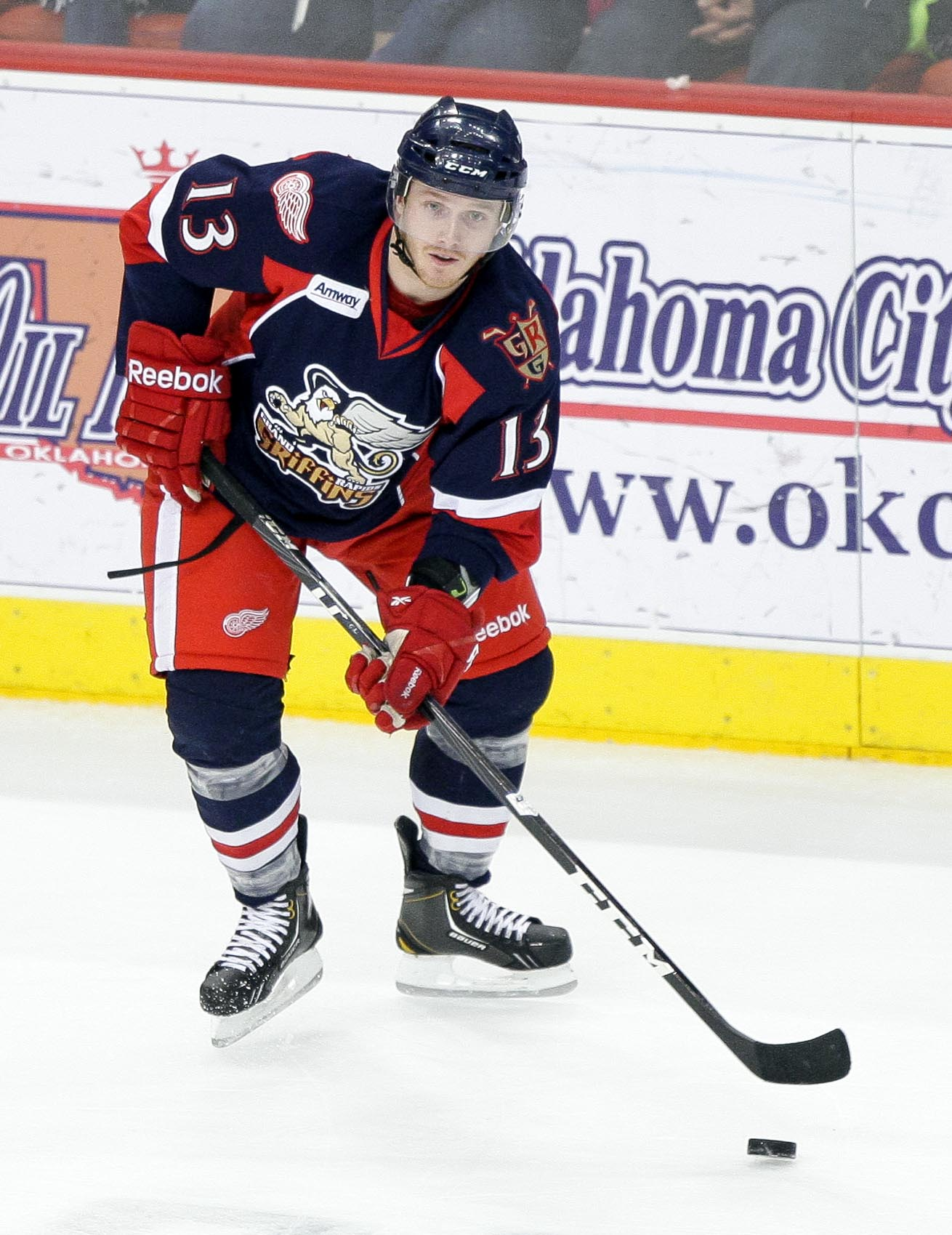
- Nyquist with the Grand Rapids Griffins in 2013
- Born: 1 September 1989 (age 37) Halmstad, Sweden
- Height: 5 ft 11 in (180 cm)
- Weight: 180 lb (82 kg; 12 st 12 lb)
- Position: Forward
- Shoots: Left
- NHL team Former teams: Free agent Detroit Red Wings; San Jose Sharks; Columbus Blue Jackets; Nashville Predators; Minnesota Wild; Winnipeg Jets
- National team: Sweden
- NHL draft: 121st overall, 2008; Detroit Red Wings
- Playing career: 2011–present

Gustav Nyquist (born 1 September 1989) is a Swedish professional ice hockey player who is a forward and an unrestricted free agent. He most recently played for the Winnipeg Jets of the National Hockey League (NHL). Nyquist was drafted 121st overall by the Detroit Red Wings in the 2008 NHL entry draft, with whom he spent the first portion of his NHL career. He has also played for the San Jose Sharks, Columbus Blue Jackets, Minnesota Wild and Nashville Predators.

== Early life ==
Nyquist was born in Halmstad in southern Sweden. He and his family later moved to Malmö, where Nyquist began playing ice hockey for a local youth team, Limhamn Hockey. He later joined the Malmö Redhawks organization, playing for their youth teams. After graduating from high school with top grades, he moved to Orono, Maine, U.S., to continue his academic and ice hockey career at the University of Maine, where he played for the Black Bears.

== Playing career ==
=== Amateur ===
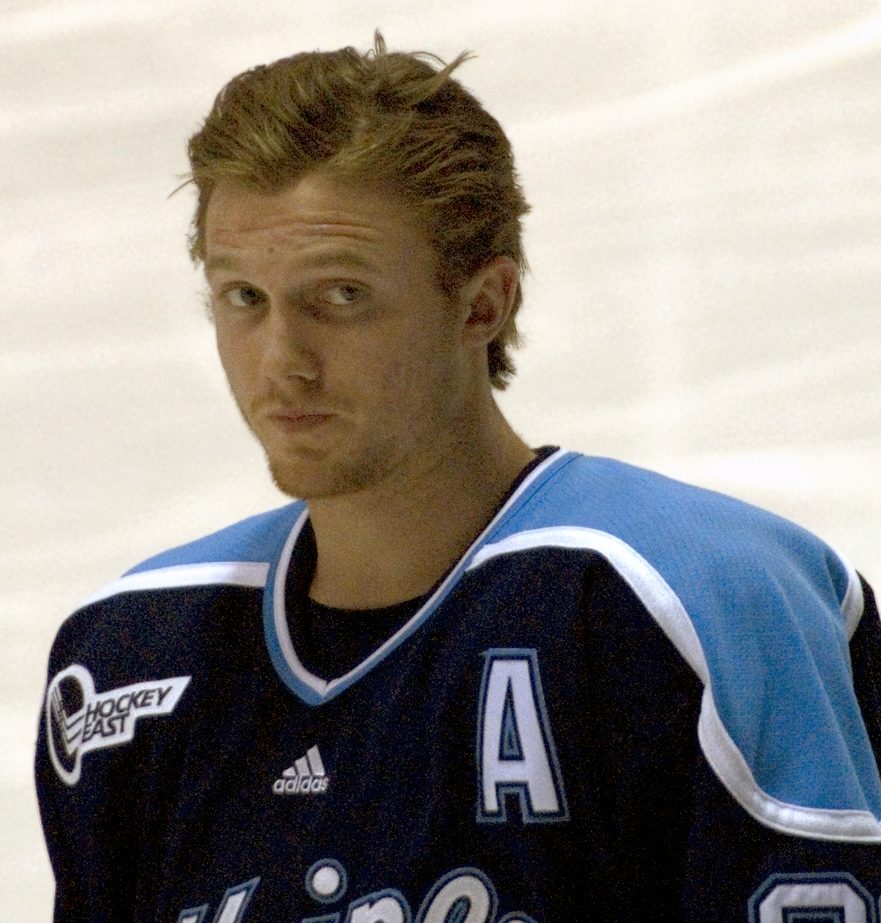
Nyquist playing with the University of Maine Black Bears in January 2011

Nyquist played in the Malmö Redhawks' organization and represented Scania in the 2006 TV-pucken tournament, where Scania finished second to Gothenburg.

Nyquist played three seasons for the University of Maine's Black Bears of the National Collegiate Athletic Association (NCAA). He led the team in points in all of his three seasons, and was the NCAA's regular season scoring leader in the 2009–10 season. In 2010, he was a Hobey Baker Award finalist, eventually being edged-out by the University of Wisconsin's Blake Geoffrion. Nyquist left the Black Bears after his junior year, signing a two-year, entry-level contract with the Detroit Red Wings, the team that drafted him 121st overall in 2008, on 25 March 2011.

=== Professional ===
==== Detroit Red Wings ====
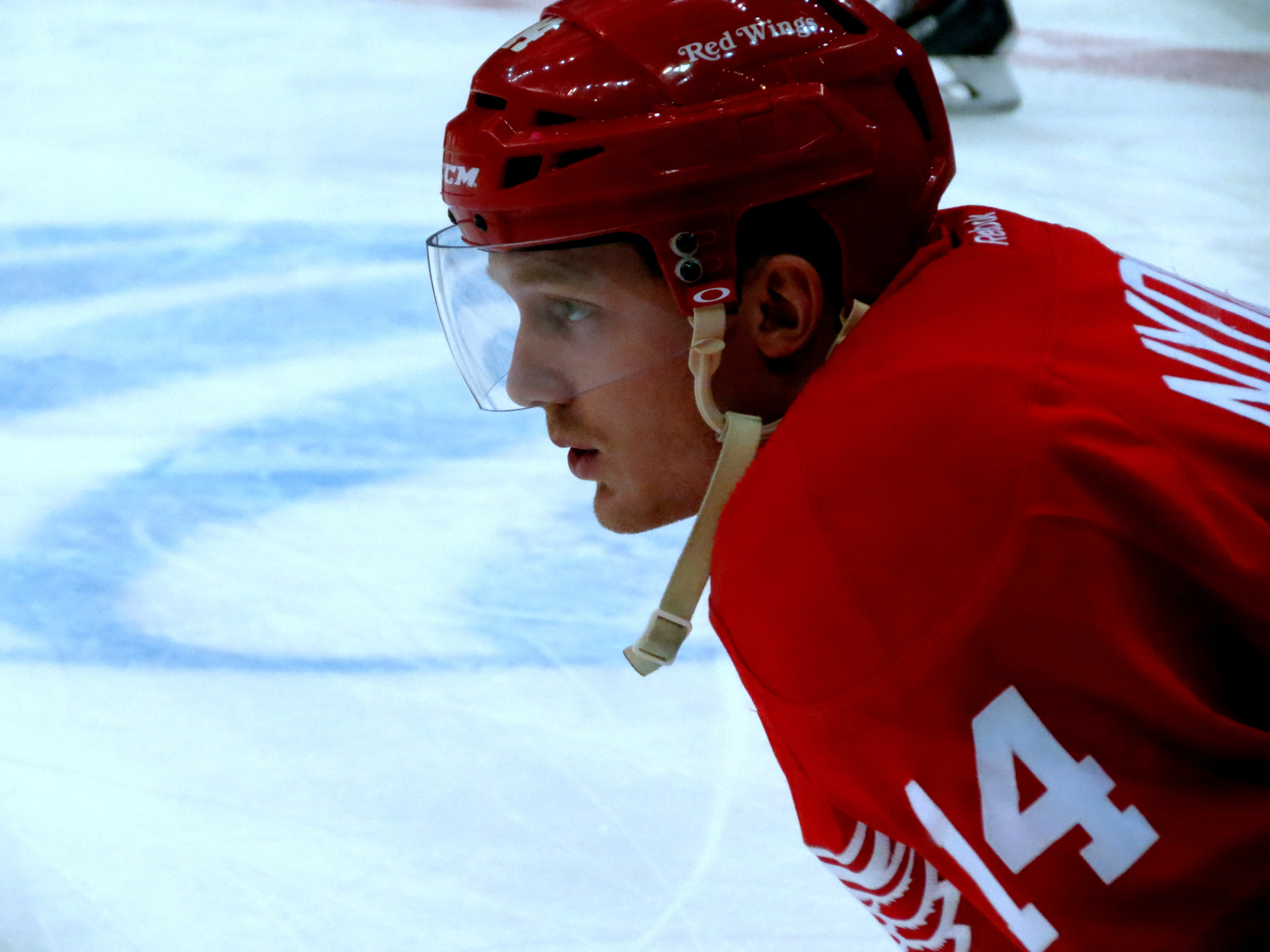
Nyquist playing with the Detroit Red Wings in April 2014

Nyquist made his professional ice hockey debut with the Red Wings' American Hockey League (AHL) affiliate, the Grand Rapids Griffins, on 25 March 2011, in a game against the Texas Stars. In his second AHL game, on 26 March, also against the Texas Stars, he scored his first AHL goal on an assist from Jamie Tardif.

Nyquist made his NHL debut with Detroit on 1 November 2011, in a 2–1 overtime loss to the Minnesota Wild. On 26 March 2012, he scored his first NHL goal in a 7–2 win against the Columbus Blue Jackets. Nyquist made his Stanley Cup playoffs debut on 13 April, against the Nashville Predators. He was recalled from Grand Rapids after forward Darren Helm suffered a deep gash to his right forearm in Game 1, when he was cut by the skate blade of Alexander Radulov, leading to season-ending surgery.

During the lockout-shortened 2012–13 season, his second professional campaign, Nyquist recorded three goals and three assists in 22 regular season games for the Red Wings. In Game 2 of the 2013 Stanley Cup playoffs, Nyquist scored a game-winning overtime goal against the Anaheim Ducks to even the series at 1–1. He also scored the first goal in Game 3 of the 2013 conference semifinals against the Chicago Blackhawks, though Chicago would eventually defeat Detroit and emerge as Stanley Cup champions. In 14 playoff games, Nyquist recorded two goals and three assists.

In addition to his NHL contributions in 2012–13, Nyquist was also the leading scorer for the Grand Rapids Griffins, recording 23 goals and 37 assists in 60 regular season games. After the Red Wings were eliminated from the playoffs, Nyquist joined the Griffins during the 2013 Calder Cup playoffs. He recorded two goals and five assists in 10 AHL playoff games to help lead the Griffins to the Calder Cup championship. Nyquist was named the Detroit Red Wings' rookie of the year at the conclusion of the season by the Detroit Sports Broadcasters' Association.

On 20 August 2013, prior to the beginning of the 2013–14 season, the Red Wings signed Nyquist to a two-year, $1.9 million contract extension. On 2 February 2014, Nyquist registered his first career hat-trick in a 6–5 overtime win over the Washington Capitals. On 24 March, Nyquist was named NHL's first star of the week; he led all NHL players with six goals and tied for the League lead with seven points in four games, helping the Red Wings earn seven of a possible eight points. He was also named the NHL second star of the month for March. He finished the month with the second-most goals, 12, and was tied for fifth with 18 points to help the Red Wings post a 7–6–2 record and move into the first wild card spot in the Eastern Conference. Nyquist scored in nine of 15 games, including a six-game goal streak, the longest by a Red Wing since 2010. Nyquist registered three two-goal games in March, and posted a career-high four-point night on 7 March.

Nyquist finished the 2013–14 season with a team-leading 28 goals, in addition to 20 assists, in 57 games played for the Red Wings. He also led all NHL skaters with 23 goals from 20 January until the end of the regular season. With six game-winning goals, he became the youngest player to lead the Red Wings in that statistic since 24-year-old Sergei Fedorov led the Red Wings with 10 in 1993–94.

On 15 October 2014, Nyquist played in his 100th career NHL game. He also became the first Red Wing to score 35 or more goals in his first 100 career NHL games since Vyacheslav Kozlov recorded 37 goals for Detroit between the 1991–92 and 1993–94 seasons.

Following the 2014–15 season Nyquist became a restricted free agent under the NHL Collective Bargaining Agreement. The Red Wings made him a qualifying offer to retain his NHL rights and on 5 July 2015, Nyquist filed for salary arbitration. On 10 July, the Red Wings signed Nyquist to a four-year, $19 million contract extension.

On 15 February 2017, Nyquist was suspended for six games for dangerously high-sticking Minnesota Wild defenceman Jared Spurgeon in the face during a game between the two teams that took place three days earlier.

==== San Jose Sharks ====
On 24 February 2019, Nyquist was traded to the San Jose Sharks in exchange for a 2019 second-round pick and a 2020 conditional third-round pick. He recorded six goals and five assists during 19 regular season games with his new team, and contributed one goal and ten assists during the 2019 Stanley Cup playoffs as the Sharks advanced to the Western Conference finals, losing to the eventual Stanley Cup champion, the St. Louis Blues.

==== Columbus Blue Jackets ====
On 1 July 2019, Nyquist left the Sharks as a free agent and signed a four-year, $22 million contract with the Columbus Blue Jackets. Nyquist finished his first season as a Blue Jacket with 42 points in 70 games.

On 4 November 2020, it was announced that Nyquist underwent surgery on his left shoulder to address a labral tear and would miss 5-6 months. He missed the entire 2020–21 season with this injury, and the Blue Jackets did not make the playoffs.

In his final season under contract with the Blue Jackets in 2022–23, Nyquist contributed with 10 goals and 12 assists for 22 points in 48 regular season games before suffering an injury, placing him on the injured reserve on 28 January 2022.

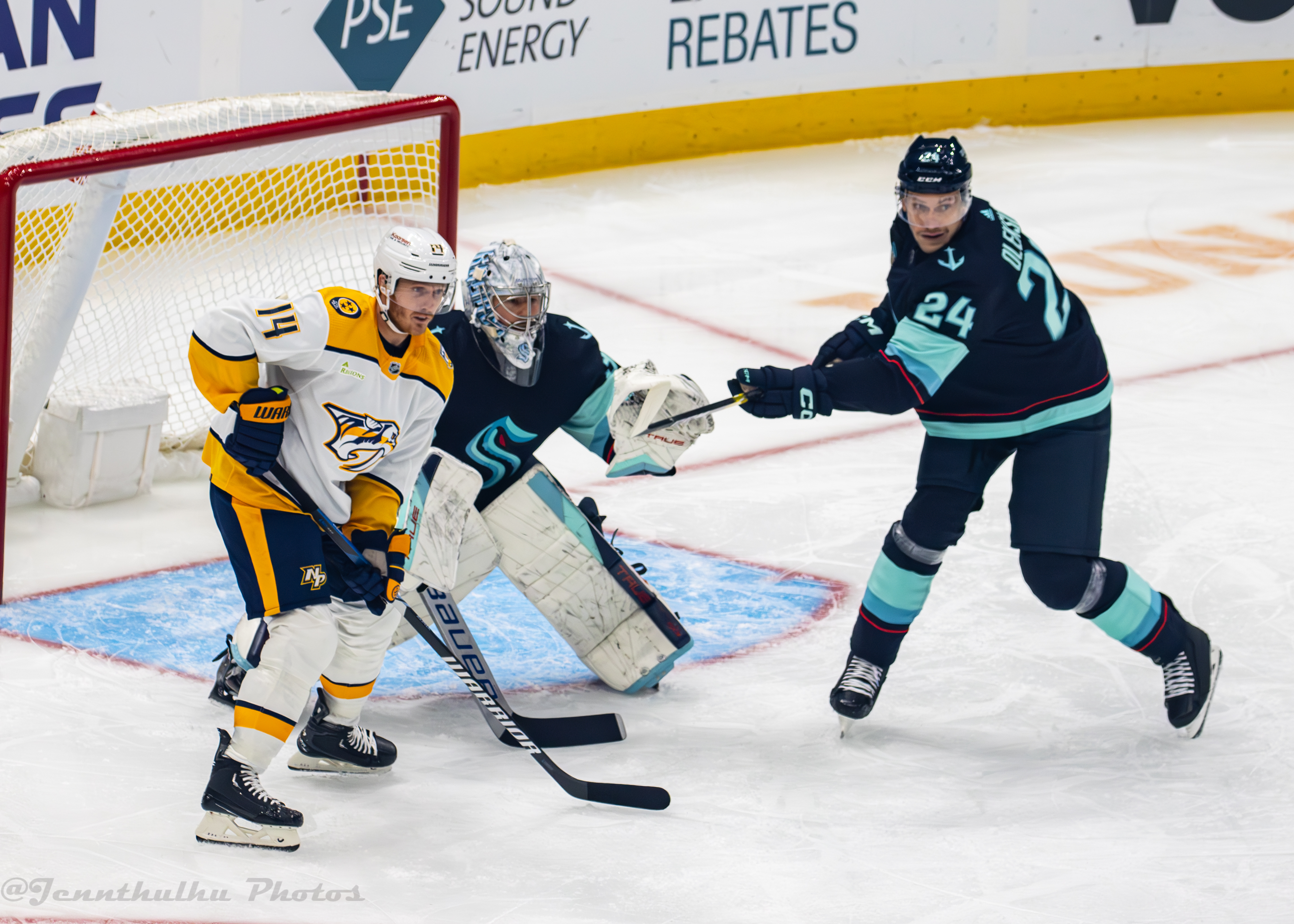
Nyquist (left) with Jamie Oleksiak of the Seattle Kraken in 2023.

==== Minnesota Wild ====
Approaching the trade deadline with the Blue Jackets in last place in the league, and while still recovering from injury, Nyquist was traded by Columbus to the Minnesota Wild in exchange for a 2023 fifth-round pick on 28 February 2023. Nyquist returned to health nearing the conclusion of the regular season, and was productive in his return with five points in just three games. He recorded five assists through six playoff appearances in a first-round loss to the Dallas Stars.

==== Nashville Predators ====
As a free agent from the Wild, Nyquist opted to remain in the Central Division by agreeing to a two-year, $6.37 million contract with the Nashville Predators on 1 July 2023. In the 2023-24 campaign, Nyquist posted his highest single-season points total with 23 goals and 52 assists for 75 points in 81 regular season games.

==== Return to Minnesota ====
On 1 March 2025, the Predators traded Nyquist back to the Wild, in exchange for a second-round draft pick in 2026.

==== Winnipeg Jets ====
On 2 July 2025, Nyquist, as an unrestricted free agent for the third time in his career, signed a one-year, $3.25 million contract with the Winnipeg Jets for the 2025–26 season. Later, on March 5th, 2026, Nyquist scored his first goal as a Winnipeg Jet in a 4-1 Jets victory over the Tampa Bay Lightning.

== International play ==
Medal record

Representing Sweden

Men's ice hockey

Winter Olympics
Silver medal – second place	2014 Sochi	

World Championships
Gold medal – first place	2018 Denmark	
Bronze medal – third place	2014 Belarus	

Nyquist was selected as a replacement for Red Wings' teammate Johan Franzén to represent Sweden at the 2014 Winter Olympics, where he won a silver medal. He represented Sweden at the 2014 IIHF World Championship, where he recorded four goals and two assists in 10 games, and won a bronze medal.

Nyquist represented Sweden at the 2016 IIHF World Championship, where he was the leading scorer for Sweden, recording seven goals and one assist in eight games. His seven goals was tied with Patrik Laine for the tournament lead.

Nyquist represented Sweden at the 2018 IIHF World Championship, where he recorded four goals and one assist in nine games, and won a gold medal.

== Personal life ==
Nyquist has a brother, Oscar Nyquist, who has played junior ice hockey for the Wilkes-Barre/Scranton Knights of the Eastern Hockey League (EHL), and was selected to play for Sweden in the 2015 Winter Universiade.

The Thoroughbred race horse Nyquist, winner of the 2016 Kentucky Derby, was named in honor of Gustav Nyquist by the owner, J. Paul Reddam, who is a fan of the Red Wings.

== Career statistics ==
=== Regular season and playoffs ===
			Regular season					Playoffs
Season	Team	League	GP	G	A	Pts	PIM	GP	G	A	Pts	PIM
2005–06	Malmö Redhawks	J18 Allsv	14	9	3	12	10	6	1	3	4	0
2006–07	Malmö Redhawks	J20	42	21	23	44	57	4	2	2	4	6
2007–08	Malmö Redhawks	J20	24	11	20	31	20	7	5	5	10	6
2008–09	University of Maine	HE	38	13	19	32	28	—	—	—	—	—
2009–10	University of Maine	HE	39	19	42	61	20	—	—	—	—	—
2010–11	University of Maine	HE	36	18	33	51	20	—	—	—	—	—
2010–11	Grand Rapids Griffins	AHL	8	1	3	4	2	—	—	—	—	—
2011–12	Grand Rapids Griffins	AHL	56	22	36	58	18	—	—	—	—	—
2011–12	Detroit Red Wings	NHL	18	1	6	7	2	4	0	0	0	0
2012–13	Grand Rapids Griffins	AHL	58	23	37	60	34	10	2	5	7	19
2012–13	Detroit Red Wings	NHL	22	3	3	6	6	14	2	3	5	2
2013–14	Grand Rapids Griffins	AHL	15	7	14	21	6	—	—	—	—	—
2013–14	Detroit Red Wings	NHL	57	28	20	48	10	5	0	0	0	0
2014–15	Detroit Red Wings	NHL	82	27	27	54	26	7	1	1	2	2
2015–16	Detroit Red Wings	NHL	82	17	26	43	34	5	1	0	1	6
2016–17	Detroit Red Wings	NHL	76	12	36	48	18	—	—	—	—	—
2017–18	Detroit Red Wings	NHL	82	21	19	40	20	—	—	—	—	—
2018–19	Detroit Red Wings	NHL	62	16	33	49	8	—	—	—	—	—
2018–19	San Jose Sharks	NHL	19	6	5	11	4	20	1	10	11	0
2019–20	Columbus Blue Jackets	NHL	70	15	27	42	16	10	0	2	2	4
2021–22	Columbus Blue Jackets	NHL	82	18	35	53	26	—	—	—	—	—
2022–23	Columbus Blue Jackets	NHL	48	10	12	22	16	—	—	—	—	—
2022–23	Minnesota Wild	NHL	3	1	4	5	0	6	0	5	5	2
2023–24	Nashville Predators	NHL	81	23	52	75	8	6	1	3	4	2
2024–25	Nashville Predators	NHL	57	9	12	21	12	—	—	—	—	—
2024–25	Minnesota Wild	NHL	22	2	5	7	4	6	0	0	0	0
2025–26	Winnipeg Jets	NHL	51	1	11	12	10	—	—	—	—	—
NHL totals			914	210	333	543	220	83	6	24	30	18

=== International ===
Year	Team	Event	Result	GP	G	A	Pts	PIM
2014	Sweden	OG	2nd place, silver medalist(s)	6	0	0	0	0
2014	Sweden	WC	3rd place, bronze medalist(s)	10	4	2	6	2
2016	Sweden	WC	6th	8	7	1	8	4
2018	Sweden	WC	1st place, gold medalist(s)	9	4	1	5	8
2025	Sweden	4NF	3rd	3	1	0	1	0
Senior totals				36	16	4	20	14

== Awards and achievements ==
Award	Year	Ref
College
All-Hockey East Rookie Team	2009	
AHCA East First-Team All-American	2010	
All-Hockey East First Team	2010, 2011	
Hockey East All-Tournament Team	2010	
AHCA East Second-Team All-American	2011	
AHL
AHL All-Rookie Team	2012	
AHL First All-Star Team	2013	

Awards and achievements
Preceded by Colin Wilson, James Marcou	Hockey East Scoring Champion; 2009–10; With: Bobby Butler	Succeeded by Paul Thompson
Preceded by Bryan Leitch	NCAA Scoring Champion; 2009–10	Succeeded by Andy Miele
