= Spencer Abbott (ice hockey) =

Canadian professional ice hockey forward

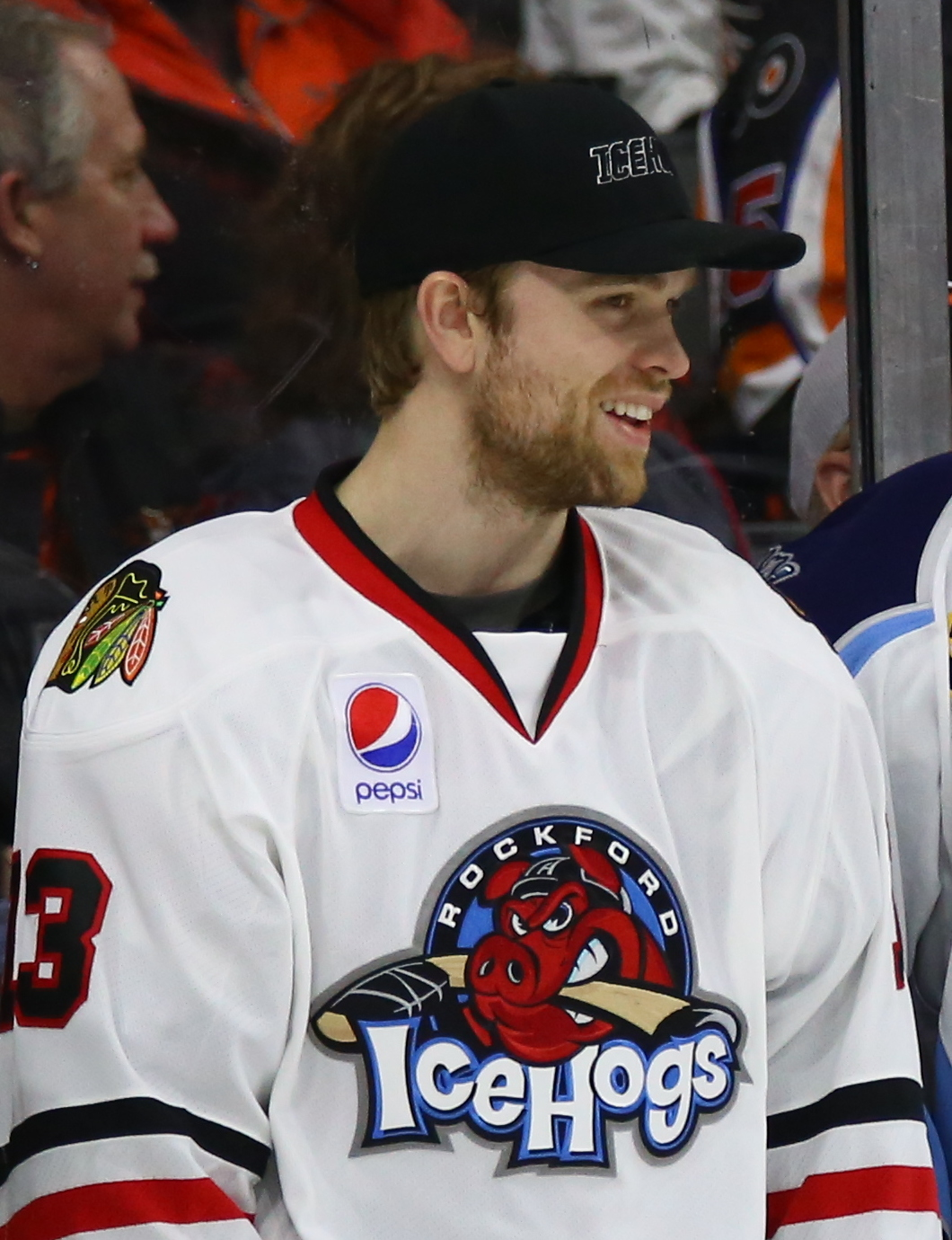
- Abbott in 2017
- Born: April 30, 1988 (age 38) Hamilton, Ontario, Canada
- Height: 5 ft 9 in (175 cm)
- Weight: 170 lb (77 kg; 12 st 2 lb)
- Position: Left wing / Right wing
- Shot: Right
- Played for: Toronto Maple Leafs; Frölunda HC; Chicago Blackhawks; EHC Kloten; Mora IK; Leksands IF; Augsburger Panther
- NHL draft: Undrafted
- Playing career: 2012–2021

Spencer Abbott (born April 30, 1988) is a Canadian former professional ice hockey forward. He played in the National Hockey League (NHL) with the Toronto Maple Leafs and Chicago Blackhawks.

== Playing career ==
Abbott spent his collegiate career playing for the Maine Black Bears in the NCAA Men's Division I Hockey East conference. In his senior year, Abbott's outstanding play was rewarded with a unanimous selection to the 2011–12 Hockey East First-Team All-Stars, as well as being named the 2011–12 Athletic Republic Player of the Year. He led the league in scoring that season, collecting 21 goals and 62 points in 39 games. He finished his four-year stint with the Black Bears having registered 146 points in 151 games.

He signed with the Toronto Maple Leafs franchise in March 2012 and joined them at the end of the 2011–12 season as an undrafted free agent. He played in three games with the Maple Leafs' American Hockey League (AHL) affiliate, the Toronto Marlies, that season. The following year he attended the Leafs training camp, but was assigned to the Marlies on September 15, 2012, to participate in the upcoming AHL training camp. In the 2013–14 season, Abbott was again part of the Maple Leafs training camp, but was assigned to the Marlies on September 20. He was recalled by the Maple Leafs after Nikolai Kulemin was injured in practice. He made his NHL debut on October 5, 2013, in the Maple Leafs home opener against the Ottawa Senators. Abbott spent most of the 2013–14 season with the Marlies, collecting 17 goals and 69 points in 63 games. He was named an AHL Second Team All-Star and was selected to participate in the AHL's 2014 All-Star Classic but missed the game due to injury. On September 14, 2015, Abbott signed a one-year contract with the Maple Leafs.

In the 2014–15 season, Abbott struggled with the Marlies, collecting 24 points in 46 games. On February 26, 2015, Abbott was traded to the Chicago Blackhawks in exchange for defenceman T. J. Brennan. He was reassigned to the Blackhawks' AHL affiliate, the Rockford IceHogs, where he remained for the duration of the season, recapturing his offence to produce 21 points in 19 games and a further 6 points in 8 playoff games.

As an impending free agent, Abbott signed his first contract abroad in agreeing to a one-year contract with Swedish club Frölunda HC of the Swedish Hockey League (SHL) on June 16, 2015. He had a very successful season in Sweden, including winning the Swedish national championship and the Champions Hockey League (CHL). In 51 SHL contests, Abbott tallied 14 goals and 22 assists.

On July 1, 2016, he returned to the Chicago Blackhawks as a free agent on a one-year, two-way deal. He attended Blackhawks training camp, but was reassigned to Rockford after passing through waivers. Abbott began the 2016–17 season, in his second stint with the Rockford IceHogs. Amongst the IceHogs scoring leaders, Abbott was recalled to replace Tyler Motte who had been assigned to Rockford. He made his debut for Chicago, his second NHL appearance, in a 4–3 victory over the Buffalo Sabres on January 5, 2017. He was returned to Rockford following the game and proceeded to collect 35 points in 53 games. At the NHL trade deadline, Abbott was dealt by the Blackhawks, along with Sam Carrick to the Anaheim Ducks in exchange for Kenton Helgesen and a 7th round pick in the 2019 NHL entry draft on March 1, 2017.

As a free agent from the Ducks, Abbott opted to extend his tenure with affiliate, the San Diego Gulls, signing a one-year AHL contract on September 25, 2017. In the 2017–18 season, while leading the Gulls in scoring with 20 points in 17 games, Abbott was traded to the Binghamton Devils in exchange for future considerations on December 8, 2017. He initially refused to report to Binghamton and was suspended without pay by the team. On December 22, he signed for the remainder of the season with Swiss-based club, EHC Kloten in the National League.

Helping Kloten avoid relegation, Abbott left as a free agent and returned for a second tenure in the SHL, agreeing to terms with Mora IK on September 17, 2018. In the 2018–19 season, Abbott led Mora's offense, registering 29 assists and 36 points in 42 regular season games. He also had 3 points in 5 games against rivals Leksands IF. On June 26, 2019, Abbott left Mora to continue in the SHL, agreeing to a one-year contract with the newly promoted Leksands IF.

On December 29, 2020, Abbott signed with the Augsburger Panther of the Deutsche Eishockey Liga (DEL).

== Career statistics ==
			Regular season					Playoffs
Season	Team	League	GP	G	A	Pts	PIM	GP	G	A	Pts	PIM
2005–06	Hamilton Red Wings	OPJHL	11	1	0	1	0	1	0	0	0	0
2006–07	Hamilton Red Wings	OPJHL	49	32	43	75	22	19	4	5	9	12
2007–08	Hamilton Red Wings	OPJHL	48	42	41	83	42	5	2	4	6	2
2008–09	University of Maine	HE	38	7	9	16	8	—	—	—	—	—
2009–10	University of Maine	HE	38	9	19	28	6	—	—	—	—	—
2010–11	University of Maine	HE	36	17	23	40	16	—	—	—	—	—
2011–12	University of Maine	HE	39	21	41	62	34	—	—	—	—	—
2011–12	Toronto Marlies	AHL	3	0	1	1	0	5	0	0	0	0
2012–13	Toronto Marlies	AHL	55	13	20	33	10	5	2	3	5	2
2013–14	Toronto Marlies	AHL	64	17	52	69	16	11	4	7	11	2
2013–14	Toronto Maple Leafs	NHL	1	0	0	0	0	—	—	—	—	—
2014–15	Toronto Marlies	AHL	46	7	17	24	10	—	—	—	—	—
2014–15	Rockford IceHogs	AHL	19	12	9	21	6	8	3	3	6	2
2015–16	Frölunda HC	SHL	42	14	21	35	4	9	0	1	1	0
2016–17	Rockford IceHogs	AHL	53	15	20	35	14	—	—	—	—	—
2016–17	Chicago Blackhawks	NHL	1	0	0	0	0	—	—	—	—	—
2016–17	San Diego Gulls	AHL	16	3	11	14	2	8	1	5	6	0
2017–18	San Diego Gulls	AHL	17	6	14	20	2	—	—	—	—	—
2017–18	EHC Kloten	NL	13	5	5	10	2	—	—	—	—	—
2018–19	Mora IK	SHL	42	7	29	36	8	—	—	—	—	—
2019–20	Leksands IF	SHL	33	7	14	21	6	—	—	—	—	—
2020–21	Augsburger Panther	DEL	32	9	18	27	12	—	—	—	—	—
NHL totals			2	0	0	0	0	—	—	—	—	—
AHL totals			273	73	144	217	60	46	10	18	28	6
SHL totals			117	28	64	92	18	9	0	1	1	0

== Awards and honours ==
Award	Year
College
All-Hockey East First Team	2011–12
AHCA East First-Team All-American	2011–12
Hobey Baker Award Finalist	2011–12
AHL
Second all-star team	2013–14

Awards and achievements
Preceded by Paul Thompson	Hockey East Player of the Year; 2011–12	Succeeded by Johnny Gaudreau
Preceded by Paul Thompson	Hockey East Scoring Champion; 2011–12	Succeeded by Johnny Gaudreau
Preceded by Andy Miele	NCAA Ice Hockey Scoring Champion; 2011–12	Succeeded by Rylan Schwartz
