= Jack Eichel =

American ice hockey player (born 1996)

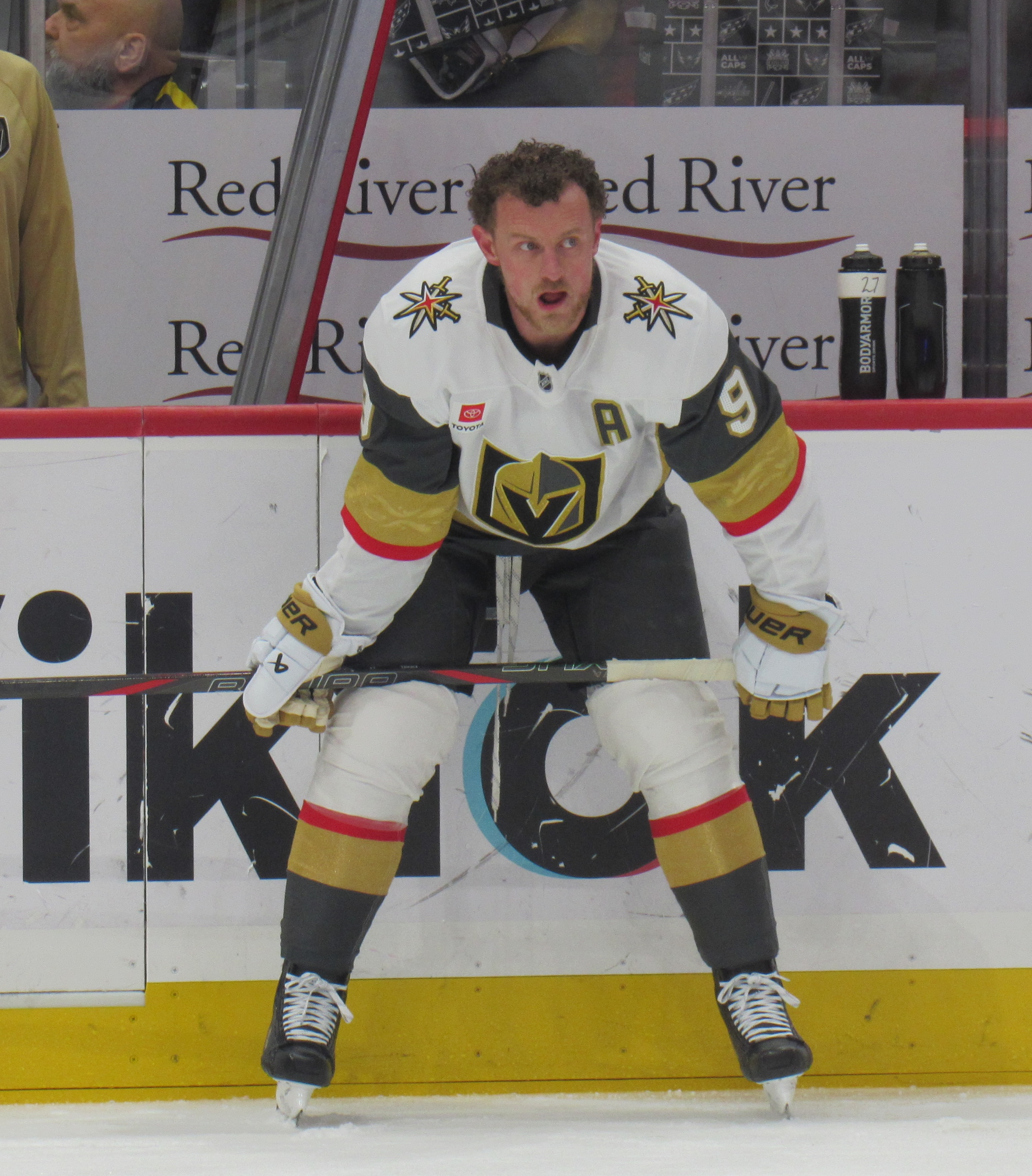
- Eichel with the Vegas Golden Knights in 2026
- Born: October 28, 1996 (age 29) North Chelmsford, Massachusetts, U.S.
- Height: 6 ft 2 in (188 cm)
- Weight: 208 lb (94 kg; 14 st 12 lb)
- Position: Center
- Shoots: Right
- NHL team Former teams: Vegas Golden Knights; Buffalo Sabres
- National team: United States
- NHL draft: 2nd overall, 2015; Buffalo Sabres
- Playing career: 2015–present

John Robert Eichel (born October 28, 1996) is an American professional ice hockey player who is a center and alternate captain for the Vegas Golden Knights of the National Hockey League (NHL). Eichel was selected second overall in the 2015 NHL entry draft by the Buffalo Sabres. Before entering the league, Eichel was described at the age of 17 as "the new face of American hockey," and he was considered a member of a rising class of generational talents in the sport.

Eichel was the recipient of the 2015 Hobey Baker Award, given to the top National Collegiate Athletic Association (NCAA) men's ice hockey player. He was the second freshman to win the award, the other being Paul Kariya in 1993. Eichel won the Stanley Cup with the Golden Knights in 2023, his first playoff appearance.

== Early life ==
Eichel was born on October 28, 1996, in Chelmsford, Massachusetts and grew up in North Chelmsford.

== Playing career ==
Eichel played for the USA Hockey National Team Development Program team during the 2012–13 and 2013–14 seasons, and was recognized for his outstanding play during the 2013–14 season when he was named to the United States Hockey League Second All-Star Team. After his second season within the Development Program, Eichel signed a letter of intent to commit to Boston University of the Hockey East on April 29, 2014.

On April 10, 2015, Eichel became the second freshman to win the Hobey Baker Award, which was previously won by Paul Kariya in 1993. In 40 games with Boston University, Eichel led the nation in scoring with 26 goals, 45 assists, and 71 points. Eichel was also the Hockey East scoring champion, Player of the Year, Rookie of the Year, First Team Hockey East and a member of the All-Rookie Team, and was named MVP of the conference tournament. The Boston Terriers reached the NCAA Frozen Four, where they lost to the Providence Friars 4–3 in the championship game, with Eichel recording an assist. Eichel was projected to be the second overall selection in the 2015 NHL entry draft behind projected first overall pick Connor McDavid.

=== Professional ===
==== Buffalo Sabres (2015–2021) ====
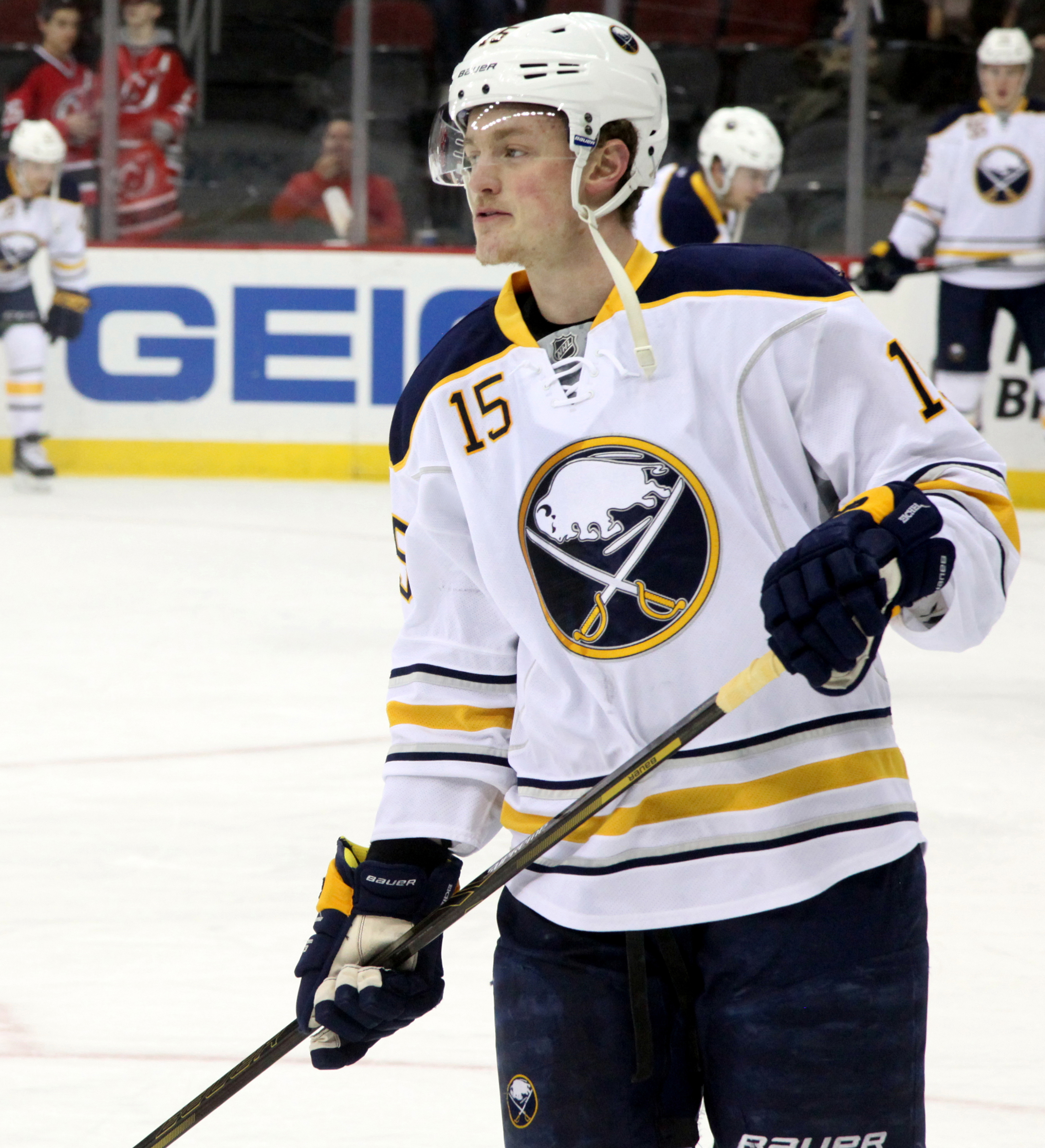
Eichel with the Sabres in 2016

On June 26, 2015, Eichel was selected second overall by the Buffalo Sabres in the 2015 NHL entry draft, one pick after the Edmonton Oilers selected Connor McDavid. In the months leading up to the draft, considerable interest and hype arose surrounding Eichel and McDavid, both seen as generational talents. For example, the sports section of the Buffalo News regularly published the "McEichel Derby," a graphic of the teams at the bottom of the standings. On July 1, 2015, Eichel signed a three-year entry-level contract with the Sabres.

On August 13, 2015, Eichel signed a sponsorship deal with Bauer Hockey, which states Eichel will wear its equipment exclusively and Bauer will provide him with its apparel.

Eichel scored his first NHL goal on October 8, 2015, becoming the youngest player in Sabres history to do so, in his first game in the NHL against the Ottawa Senators. He finished his rookie campaign with 24 goals and 56 points in 81 games, being the Sabres' top goalscorer and second in points (after Ryan O'Reilly) and second in both criteria among rookies, after Artemi Panarin.

On October 12, 2016, Eichel suffered a severe high ankle sprain to his left ankle in practice and had to be helped off of the ice; he missed the first two months of the season before making his season debut on November 29. He finished the year with 24 goals and 33 assists for 57 points in just 61 games.

Before the 2017–18 season, on October 3, 2017, the Sabres signed Eichel to an eight-year, $80 million contract extension worth $10 million annually which began at the start of the 2018–19 season. On December 15, 2017, Eichel scored his first career hat trick against the Carolina Hurricanes in a 5–4 loss. On January 11, 2018, Eichel was selected as the sole representative of the Sabres for the 2018 NHL All-Star game. This was the first NHL All-Star game of Eichel's career. During a game in February against the Boston Bruins, Eichel sprained his ankle and was ruled out for 4–6 weeks. He returned 15 games later to help the Sabres beat the Chicago Blackhawks for the first time since 2009. Eichel finished the 2017–18 season with 25 goals and 39 assists for a total of 64 points in only 67 games.

During the summer before the 2018–19 season, Eichel changed his jersey number from 15 to 9, the same number he wore at Boston University. On October 3, 2018, before the beginning of the regular season, Eichel was named the captain of the Sabres. On March 10, 2019, Eichel was suspended for two games for illegally checking Colorado Avalanche player Carl Söderberg in the head. On March 28, 2019, Eichel scored his 100th career goal in a 5–4 overtime loss to the Detroit Red Wings.

On November 16, 2019, Eichel scored four goals in a 4–2 win over the Ottawa Senators. He was the seventh Sabres player to record four goals in one game and first since Thomas Vanek did it on April 10, 2010. On December 7, Eichel recorded two assists to reach 300 career points in a 6–5 overtime loss to the Vancouver Canucks. On January 2, 2020, Eichel became the first player in Sabres history to score a penalty shot goal in overtime, and also set a franchise record for goals scored in overtime, as the Sabres won 3–2 against the Edmonton Oilers. On February 1, Eichel scored the eighth overtime goal of his career in a 2–1 win over the Columbus Blue Jackets, improving the previous franchise record for most regular-season overtime goals.

On April 14, 2021, it was announced that Eichel would miss the remainder of the 2020–21 season to recover from surgery to repair a spinal disc herniation. In May, Eichel, along with Sam Reinhart, expressed their frustration with the Sabres. He stated, "I have a lot of thinking to do in this offseason... there's a lot I have to consider." Specifically, Eichel was frustrated with the Sabres' refusal to clear him to undergo artificial disk replacement, a procedure recommended by his personal chiropractor and an outside doctor he had consulted, but had never before been performed on an active NHL player. The current collective bargaining agreement between the NHL and its players' union gives teams the final say on players' medical care.

Eichel's relationship with the Sabres failed to improve, and on September 23, 2021, Eichel was stripped of the team captaincy as a result of failing his physical and being placed on long-term injured reserve.

==== Vegas Golden Knights (2021–present) ====
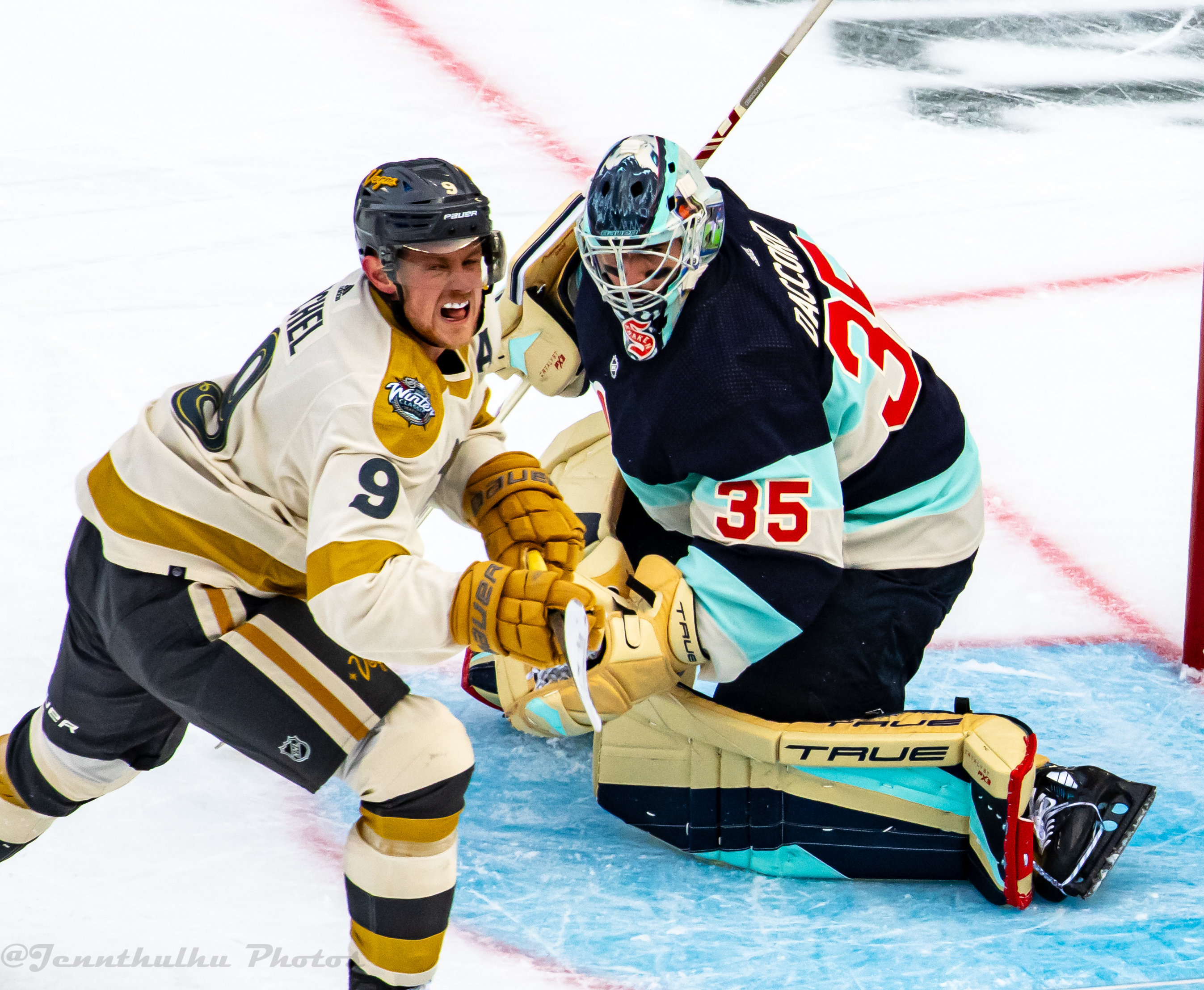
Eichel making a play in front of Joey Daccord of the Seattle Kraken during the 2024 Winter Classic.

On November 4, 2021, Eichel was traded, along with a third-round draft pick, to the Vegas Golden Knights in exchange for Peyton Krebs, Alex Tuch, and first-round and second-round draft picks. His new team allowed Eichel to undergo his preferred surgery, and following recovery he began training with the team. He made his debut with the Golden Knights on February 16, 2022, a 2–0 loss to the Colorado Avalanche. This was Eichel's first NHL game in almost a year, and he remarked that "I was having a pretty fun time out there," adding that he expected returning to competition would be a process. He scored his first goal with the Golden Knights on February 20, a 4–1 victory over the San Jose Sharks, notching an assist as well in the game. On March 10, he made his first appearance with the Golden Knights in Buffalo, where he was greeted with consistent booing from the crowd, notably when Tuch, who had been part of the trade, stripped the puck from him and scored to complete the Sabres' 3–1 victory. Eichel remarked, "This is about the loudest I've heard this place ever. Really. After it took seven years, and me leaving for them to get into the game." Eichel would ultimately finish the season with twelve goals and ten assists in 33 games, generally deemed a successful return, but the Golden Knights struggled with injuries to numerous core players and ultimately missed the playoffs for the first time in franchise history. This turn of events would also be greeted with jeers among many Sabres fans.

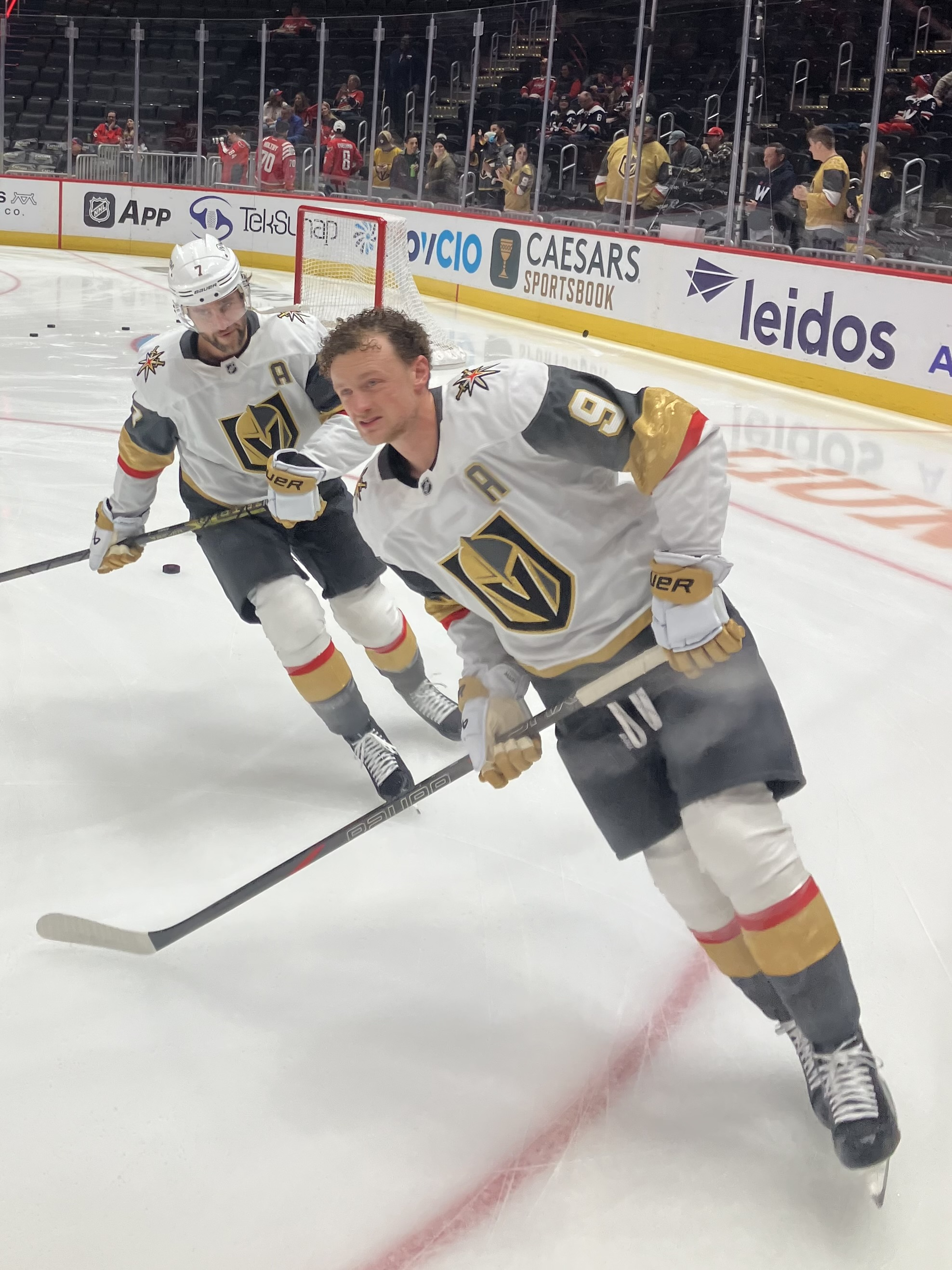
Eichel (foreground) and Alex Pietrangelo with the Golden Knights in October 2024.

The 2022–23 season would begin on a much better note for the Golden Knights, with new coach Bruce Cassidy's arrival shifting the team's playing style and calling on Eichel to assume heavy responsibilities in the defensive zone. In the first 23 games of the season, Eichel registered 26 points, a career-high pace, while the Knights took a clear lead in the Pacific Division. His second return to Buffalo would be a much greater success than the first, scoring a hat trick and also managing an assist while leading the Golden Knights to a 7–4 victory. Eichel missed several games in December and January with a lower body injury, which inaugurated a noticeable cold spell in his point production, in turn contributing to a downtick in the Golden Knights' record heading into the All-Star break. He was rejuvenated upon his return, helping the team win the Pacific Division title. He finished the regular season with 27 goals and 39 assists in 67 games. The Golden Knights qualified for the 2023 Stanley Cup playoffs with a first-round matchup against the Winnipeg Jets, ending Eichel's long history of missing the post-season. After a slow start in the early games, Eichel became one of the Golden Knights' most important players, leading the team to win the series in five games. Vegas advanced to the second round to face the Edmonton Oilers, a matchup that attracted media attention due to its pitting Eichel against McDavid, which had been considered a potential career rivalry at the time of the 2015 draft. The Golden Knights defeated the Oilers in a six-game series, reaching the Western Conference Final against the Dallas Stars, with Eichel earning praise for his playoff performance. After beating the Stars in six games, the Golden Knights reached the Cup Final against the Florida Panthers, winning in five games. Eichel led the league in postseason scoring with 26 points, the third-most for any NHL player in their first playoffs. He finished second in voting for the Conn Smythe Trophy for playoff MVP, behind linemate Jonathan Marchessault.

In the 2024–25 season, Eichel had a career-high 94 points in 77 games, leading the Golden Knights to a divisional title in the regular season. For the first time, he was named a finalist for the Lady Byng Memorial Trophy, awarded by the Professional Hockey Writers' Association to the played "voted best to combine sportsmanship, gentlemanly conduct and ability."

On October 8, 2025, Eichel signed an eight-year extension to remain with the Golden Knights for an average annual value of $13.5 million. Following a start to the 2025–26 season that saw him record five goals and ten assists in his first six games, Eichel was named the NHL's second star of the week for the second week of the season; additionally, Eichel's statline made him the third player in the past 30 years to record 15 or more points through his team's first six games.

== International play ==
Medal record

Men's ice hockey

Representing the United States

Olympic Games
Gold medal – first place	2026 Milano Cortina	

World Championships
Bronze medal – third place	2015 Czech Republic	

4 Nations Face-Off
Runner-up	2025 Canada/United States	

IIHF World U18 Championship
Gold medal – first place	2014 Finland	
Silver medal – second place	2013 Russia	

As a 15-year-old Eichel represented the United States at the 2012 Winter Youth Olympics. He won a bronze medal with Team USA at the 2013 World U-17 Hockey Challenge and a silver medal at the 2013 IIHF World U18 Championships. The following season he helped the USA squad capture the gold medal at the 2014 IIHF World U18 Championships, and he competed as a 17-year-old as Team USA's youngest player at the 2014 World Junior Ice Hockey Championships. Eichel represented Team USA in the 2015 World Junior Ice Hockey Championship.

At the conclusion of his freshman season with the Terriers, Eichel was named to make his full international debut with Team USA at the 2015 World Championships. Eichel scored 2 goals, including a game winner in the group stage against Slovakia, and 5 assists during the tournament, where Team USA won bronze. Eichel was selected to the 2017 Team USA IIHF World Championship roster. Team USA was eliminated in the quarter-finals and placed fifth overall. Eichel recorded zero goals and five assists in eight games at the championship.

On April 19, 2019, Eichel was selected to represent Team USA at the 2019 IIHF World Championship, held in Bratislava and Košice, Slovakia.

On June 16, 2025, he was one of six players named to Team USA's preliminary roster for the 2026 Winter Olympics. Eichel scored two goals and four assists, helping Team USA win their first gold medal at the Olympics since 1980. Amid online backlash faced by the men's Olympic hockey team regarding the inclusion of FBI director Kash Patel during their gold medal celebrations and members of the team laughing at President Trump's comments of being impeached if he did not invite the women's team to the White House, Eichel was among the majority who visited with the president and attended the State of the Union. Eichel was previously photographed attending a Trump Rally in 2024.

== Career statistics ==
=== Regular season and playoffs ===
Bold indicates led league

			Regular season					Playoffs
Season	Team	League	GP	G	A	Pts	PIM	GP	G	A	Pts	PIM
2010–11	Boston Junior Bruins	EmJHL	40	15	21	36	16	7	2	5	7	6
2011–12	Boston Junior Bruins	EmJHL	36	39	47	86	36	3	0	0	0	0
2011–12	Boston Junior Bruins	EJHL	3	0	0	0	0	—	—	—	—	—
2012–13	U.S. NTDP Juniors	USHL	35	13	14	27	14	—	—	—	—	—
2012–13	U.S. NTDP U17	USDP	36	19	15	34	16	—	—	—	—	—
2012–13	U.S. NTDP U18	USDP	22	10	8	18	14	—	—	—	—	—
2013–14	U.S. NTDP Juniors	USHL	24	20	25	45	20	—	—	—	—	—
2013–14	U.S. NTDP U18	USDP	53	38	49	87	28	—	—	—	—	—
2014–15	Boston University	HE	40	26	**45**	**71**	28	—	—	—	—	—
2015–16	Buffalo Sabres	NHL	81	24	32	56	22	—	—	—	—	—
2016–17	Buffalo Sabres	NHL	61	24	33	57	22	—	—	—	—	—
2017–18	Buffalo Sabres	NHL	67	25	39	64	32	—	—	—	—	—
2018–19	Buffalo Sabres	NHL	77	28	54	82	26	—	—	—	—	—
2019–20	Buffalo Sabres	NHL	68	36	42	78	34	—	—	—	—	—
2020–21	Buffalo Sabres	NHL	21	2	16	18	6	—	—	—	—	—
2021–22	Vegas Golden Knights	NHL	34	14	11	25	10	—	—	—	—	—
2022–23	Vegas Golden Knights	NHL	67	27	39	66	6	22	6	**20**	**26**	14
2023–24	Vegas Golden Knights	NHL	63	31	37	68	27	7	3	4	7	0
2024–25	Vegas Golden Knights	NHL	77	28	66	94	8	11	1	9	10	0
2025–26	Vegas Golden Knights	NHL	74	27	63	90	18	22	2	**20**	22	16
NHL totals			690	266	432	698	233	62	12	53	65	30

=== International ===
Year	Team	Event	Result	GP	G	A	Pts	PIM
2013	United States	U17	3rd place, bronze medalist(s)	5	3	0	3	2
2013	United States	WJC18	2nd place, silver medalist(s)	7	1	1	2	6
2014	United States	WJC	5th	5	1	4	5	0
2014	United States	WJC18	1st place, gold medalist(s)	7	5	5	10	2
2015	United States	WJC	5th	5	1	3	4	6
2015	United States	WC	3rd place, bronze medalist(s)	10	2	5	7	8
2016	Team North America	WCH	5th	3	1	1	2	0
2017	United States	WC	5th	8	0	5	5	4
2019	United States	WC	7th	8	2	6	8	2
2025	United States	4NF	2nd	4	0	4	4	0
2026	United States	OG	1st place, gold medalist(s)	6	2	4	6	2
Junior totals				29	11	13	24	16
Senior totals				39	7	25	32	16

== Awards and honors ==
Award	Year
USHL
USHL Second All-Star Team	2014
College
Hockey East All-Rookie Team	2015
Hockey East Rookie of the Year	2015
Hockey East First All-American Team	2015
All-Hockey East First All-Star Team	2015
Hockey East Player of the Year	2015
Hockey East Champions	2015
William Flynn Tournament Most Valuable Player	2015
Hockey East Scoring Champion	2015
Hockey East Three-Stars Award	2015
Tim Taylor Award	2015
Hobey Baker Award	2015
NHL
NHL All-Rookie Team	2016
NHL All-Star Game	2018, 2019, 2020, 2024
Stanley Cup champion	2023
International
CCM/USA Hockey All-American Prospects Game Most Valuable Player	2014

Awards and achievements
Preceded by Johnny Gaudreau	Hockey East Player of the Year; 2014–15	Succeeded by Kevin Boyle; Thatcher Demko
Preceded by Johnny Gaudreau	Hobey Baker Award; 2014–15	Succeeded by Jimmy Vesey
Preceded by Johnny Gaudreau	Hockey East Scoring Champion; 2014–15	Succeeded by Andrew Poturalski
Preceded by Johnny Gaudreau	NCAA Ice Hockey Scoring Champion; 2014–15	Succeeded by Kyle Connor
Preceded by Sam Anas	Tim Taylor Award; 2014–15	Succeeded by Kyle Connor
Preceded by Mario Puskarich	Hockey East Rookie of the Year; 2014–15	Succeeded by Colin White
Preceded by Clay Witt	Hockey East Three-Stars Award; 2014–15	Succeeded by Kevin Boyle
Preceded by Connor Hellebuyck	Hockey East Tournament MVP; 2015	Succeeded by Kevin Boyle
Preceded by Sam Reinhart	Buffalo Sabres first-round draft pick 2015	Succeeded by Alexander Nylander
Sporting positions
Preceded by Brian Gionta	Buffalo Sabres captain 2018–2021	Succeeded by Kyle Okposo
