= Johnny Gaudreau =

American ice hockey player (1993–2024)

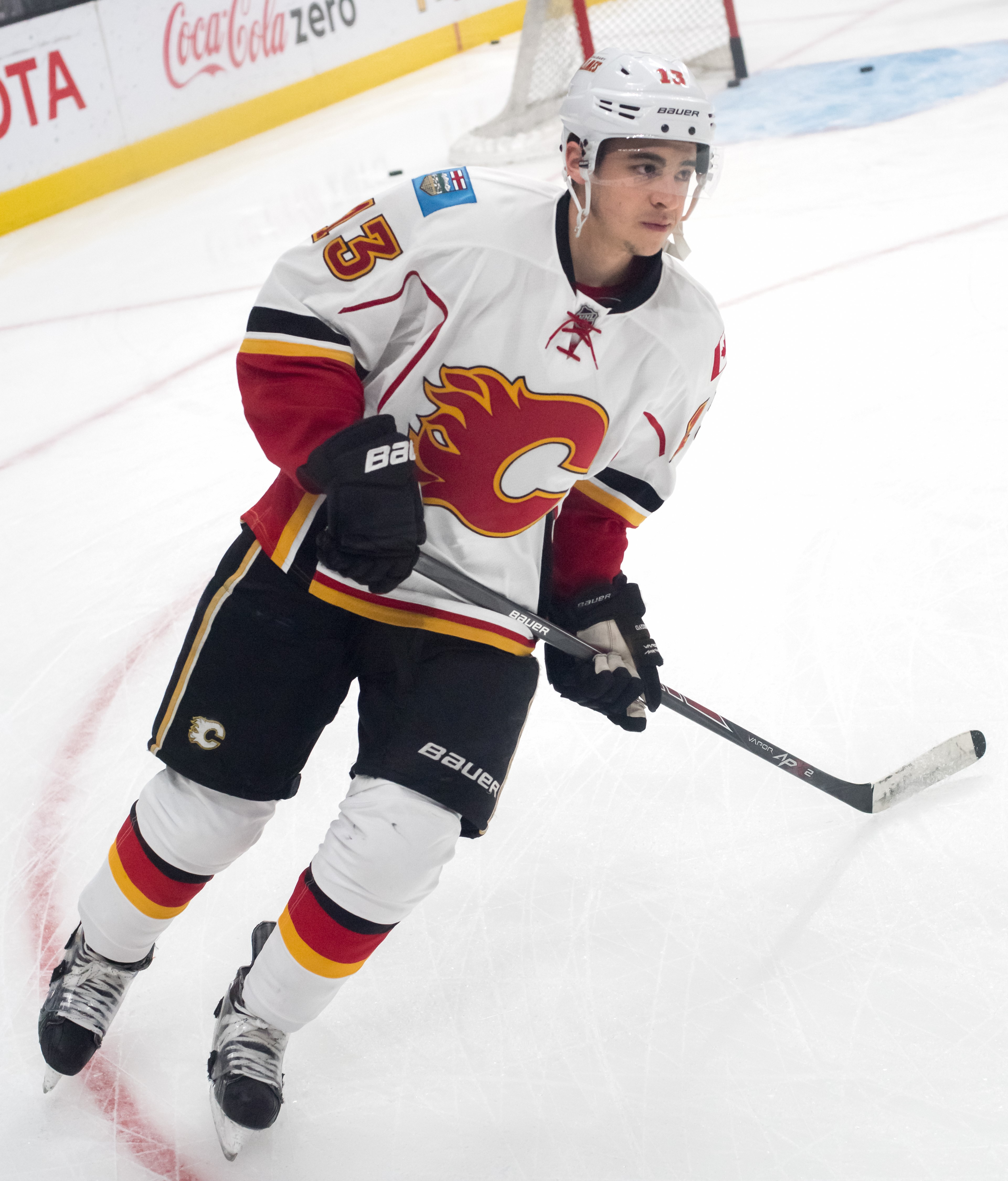
- Gaudreau with the Calgary Flames in 2016
- Born: August 13, 1993 Salem, New Jersey, U.S.
- Died: August 29, 2024 (aged 31) Oldmans Township, New Jersey, U.S.
- Height: 5 ft 9 in (175 cm)
- Weight: 163 lb (74 kg; 11 st 9 lb)
- Position: Left wing
- Shot: Left
- Played for: Calgary Flames; Columbus Blue Jackets
- National team: United States
- NHL draft: 104th overall, 2011; Calgary Flames
- Playing career: 2014–2024

John Michael Gaudreau (August 13, 1993 – August 29, 2024) was an American professional ice hockey player. A left winger, he played 11 seasons in the National Hockey League (NHL). He played college ice hockey for the Boston College Eagles in NCAA Division I for three seasons beginning in 2011 and was selected in the fourth round, 104th overall, by the Calgary Flames in the 2011 NHL entry draft. Nicknamed "Johnny Hockey", he was named the 2014 recipient of the Hobey Baker Award as the best player in the NCAA and, during his first full NHL season in 2014–15, was selected to play in the 2015 NHL All-Star Game, as well as being named to the annual NHL All-Rookie team. Gaudreau was a Calder Memorial Trophy finalist for the NHL's best rookie and won the Lady Byng Memorial Trophy as the league's most gentlemanly player for the 2016–17 season. In 2022, Gaudreau signed with the Columbus Blue Jackets, where he spent his last two seasons. Gaudreau was noted as helping to grow opportunities for smaller hockey players; despite measuring in at 5 ft 9 in (1.75 m), he was a seven-time NHL All-Star and finished fourth in Hart Memorial Trophy voting twice.

Gaudreau and his brother Matthew were killed by a drunk driver while cycling on August 29, 2024, in Oldmans Township, New Jersey.

== Early life ==
Gaudreau was born on August 13, 1993, in Salem, New Jersey, to Guy Gaudreau, a former soccer player, college hockey player, and high school coach from Beebe Plain, Vermont, and Jane Gaudreau. He had two sisters and a younger brother, Matthew, who played hockey for the Worcester Railers and the Bridgeport Sound Tigers in the ECHL and AHL, respectively.

Gaudreau grew up in Carneys Point Township, New Jersey. As a child, he played little league baseball in the Penns Grove Little League, where he was teammates with future Boston Red Sox pitcher Mike Shawaryn, and participated in the 2006 Quebec International Pee-Wee Hockey Tournament with a minor ice hockey team from Hershey, Pennsylvania. He initially attended Gloucester Catholic High School in Gloucester City, New Jersey, but later graduated from Dubuque Senior High School in Dubuque, Iowa while playing for the Dubuque Fighting Saints.

== Playing career ==
=== USHL (2010–2011) ===
Gaudreau played the 2010–11 season with the Dubuque Fighting Saints in the United States Hockey League (USHL), where he played in the 2011 USHL All-Star Game and helped his team win the Clark Cup as the USHL champions. He ultimately finished second in the league in goals, with 36, and fourth in points, with 72. Gaudreau's outstanding play was rewarded with selections to the USHL All-Rookie Team and the All-USHL Second Team, as well as the USHL Rookie of the Year award.

Gaudreau was selected in the fourth round, 104th overall, in the 2011 NHL entry draft by the Calgary Flames. Listed at 5 ft 6 in (1.68 m) and 137 lb (62 kg), Gaudreau was the lightest player selected at the draft, and tied with Rocco Grimaldi for the shortest player selected.

=== NCAA (2011–2014) ===
After attending the Calgary Flames training camp ahead of the 2011–12 season, Gaudreau started his career in the NCAA with the Division I Boston College Eagles team in the Hockey East conference. He originally signed a letter of intent to play with Hockey East rival Northeastern University, but opted for Boston College when Northeastern hockey head coach Greg Cronin resigned in June 2011 to take a position with the NHL's Toronto Maple Leafs.

As a freshman at Boston College, Gaudreau scored 21 goals and 23 assists (44 points) in 44 games, leading all first-year students in scoring. He played an integral part in Boston College's win in the team's national championship, scoring a goal late in the third period in their 4–1 win in the final over Ferris State University. Gaudreau was awarded the Bill Flynn Trophy as the Most Valuable Player of the Hockey East Championship Tournament. He also helped the Eagles win the traditional Beanpot Tournament for the third year in a row and was named Beanpot MVP after the tournament.

In his sophomore campaign, Gaudreau emerged as the team's star and improved upon his statistics, achieving a 21–30–51 scoring line in 35 games, and leading the nation in points per game at 1.46. He then led the Eagles to a fourth consecutive Beanpot championship after helping to win a gold medal for the United States at the 2013 World Juniors. Despite Boston College's defeat by archrival Boston University in the Hockey East tournament semifinals and loss to Union College in the first round of the NCAA tournament, Gaudreau was named Hockey East Player of the Year, as well as an American Collegiate Hockey Association (ACHA) First Team All-American. On April 3, 2013, Gaudreau was named one of the three finalists for the 2013 Hobey Baker Award, awarded to the NCAA's top men's ice hockey player, along with Eric Hartzell and Drew LeBlanc. St. Cloud State's Drew LeBlanc eventually won the award.

Gaudreau remained at Boston College for his junior year despite rumors of him turning professional and joining the Calgary Flames. According to Gaudreau, one of the main reasons he stayed was to play with his younger brother Matthew, who joined Boston College's team in the fall. Gaudreau subsequently led the NCAA in every major scoring category, scoring 36 goals and 44 assists for 80 points in 40 games, a 2.00 point per game pace, the highest production by any player in the country since 2003. After a 5–4 Eagles loss to Holy Cross in November, Gaudreau was placed on a line with Bill Arnold and Kevin Hayes, which quickly became collegiate hockey's most offensively-potent line, producing 46 goals and 68 assists for 114 points as a trio. In addition, Gaudreau tied Paul Kariya's record for the Hockey East single-season scoring streak at 31 games, scoring 29 goals and 61 points during the span. For his season, he was named the league's Player of the Year for the second straight season, as well as the league's scoring champion with 36 points in 20 games, and was named a unanimous First-Team All-Star. He was also named a Hobey Baker top 10 finalist on March 20, and a top three "Hobey Hat Trick" finalist for the second-straight year on April 2. Although the Eagles lost to Union College in the Frozen Four on April 11, Gaudreau was named the 2014 recipient of the Hobey Baker Award.

=== Professional ===
==== Calgary Flames (2014–2022) ====
Gaudreau entered the NHL on the day he received the Hobey Baker Award. On April 11, 2014, shortly after the ceremony, Gaudreau and Eagles teammate Bill Arnold signed entry-level contracts with the Calgary Flames, Arnold having been drafted by Calgary in 2010. Both made their NHL debut in the Flames' final game of the 2013–14 season against the Vancouver Canucks. Gaudreau scored the Flames' only goal on his first shot of his first professional game.

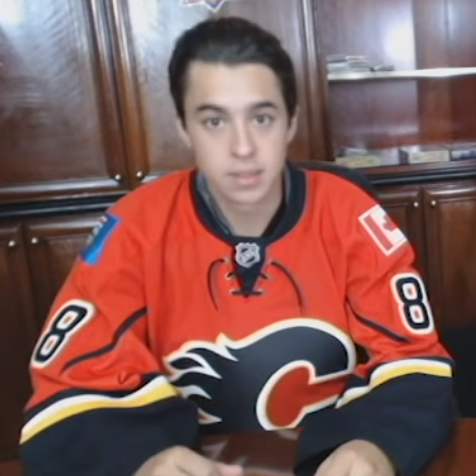
Gaudreau in September 2016

To begin the 2014–15 season, Gaudreau earned a spot on the Flames' roster to continue his NHL career. Starting off slowly, Gaudreau did not record a point until the year's sixth game. However, he heated up quickly, amassing 12 goals and 30 points through 37 games. He scored his first career NHL hat-trick against Jonathan Quick on December 22, 2014, in a 4–3 comeback win over the Los Angeles Kings, becoming the youngest Flames player to record a hat-trick since Joe Nieuwendyk in the 1987–88 season. Gaudreau was selected to play in the 2015 NHL All-Star Game in Columbus, Ohio, on January 25, 2015, and participated in the Skills Competition, garnering attention with Jakub Voráček for their antics during the shootout challenge. The shootout move, which imitated the previous move performed by Ryan Johansen (who helped seven-year-old Cole Vogt, the son of Columbus Blue Jackets trainer Mike Vogt, score a goal on Corey Crawford) went viral. Voráček, who went immediately after Johansen, "helped" Gaudreau score a goal in the same manner as Johansen did with Vogt, making fun of Gaudreau's size and youth, as his small stature in comparison to other NHLers led some to believe that he looked like a child.

Gaudreau was originally named to the All-Star Skills Competition Rookie Team, limited to only the competition portion, but was promoted to the All-Star Game itself as a replacement to Pittsburgh Penguins forward and captain Sidney Crosby, who could not play due to injury. Gaudreau was named to Team Toews and recorded two assists in the game, both on goals scored by the Nashville Predators' Filip Forsberg. On March 11, 2015, Gaudreau scored his 50th point of the season, becoming the first Flames rookie to reach the mark since Jarome Iginla in 1996–97. Gaudreau finished the season tied for the rookie scoring lead with Mark Stone of the Ottawa Senators. Gaudreau had 24 goals and led all rookies with 40 assists, while Stone had 26 goals. He was a finalist for the Calder Memorial Trophy as the NHL's best rookie, but the award went to Florida Panthers defenseman Aaron Ekblad, with Gaudreau finishing third. He was named to the NHL's All-Rookie team for the 2014–15 season.

The 2015–16 season was a breakout year for Gaudreau, as the sophomore set career highs in goals, assists, and points en route to finishing tied for sixth among all NHL players in total points. For the second straight year, Gaudreau participated in the NHL All-Star Game. Gaudreau was selected as a finalist to be the All-Star Game MVP, an honor eventually given to unlikely write-in candidate enforcer John Scott. However, the Flames failed to live up to high expectations following their surprisingly successful 2014–15 season, finishing 26th in the NHL and missing the Stanley Cup playoffs for the sixth time in seven seasons.

Gaudreau missed the entirety of the Flames' 2016 training camp due to a contract dispute. On October 10, 2016, two days before the Flames' season opener, Gaudreau signed a six-year, $40.5 million contract worth $6.75 million annually. On November 16, 2016, in a game against the Minnesota Wild, Gaudreau suffered a finger fracture. He had surgery the following day. Despite speculation he would miss up to six weeks of the season, Gaudreau returned after 10 games. Gaudreau finished the season with 18 goals and 43 assists for 61 points in 72 games, leading the Flames in scoring. However, in the 2017 playoffs, the Flames would lose in a four-game sweep to the Anaheim Ducks in the first round, with Gaudreau unable to score a goal and record only two assists for two points in all four of the games played.

Gaudreau set a career high in points scored during the 2017–18 season, leading the Flames with 84 points (24 goals, career high 60 assists). He was named an NHL All-Star for the fourth consecutive year, but would not participate in the playoffs as the Flames came up short of a late-season push for the last wild card spot in the Western Conference.

The 2018–19 season was Gaudreau's best regular season. He finished with a career-best 99 points, including career highs in goals (36), assists (63), and points (99). He was tied for seventh place in league scoring. The Flames won the Pacific Division and were the Western Conference's top seed heading into the 2019 playoffs. Gaudreau finished fourth in voting for the Hart Memorial Trophy, awarded by the Professional Hockey Writers' Association (PHWA) to the league's most valuable player. However, in the first round of the 2019 playoffs, the Flames lost to the eighth-seeded Colorado Avalanche in five games. Gaudreau managed only one point, an assist, in all five contests, which was singled out as a key weakness for the Flames postseason upset.

Following his success in 2018–19, Gaudreau had a disappointing 2019–20 season, hitting career lows of only 18 goals and 40 assists for 58 points in 70 games. The onset of the COVID-19 pandemic led to the regular season being prematurely halted in March. The NHL eventually arranged to hold the 2020 playoffs in a bubble in Edmonton and Toronto. The Flames had been eighth in the Western Conference when the regular season was suspended, and so played the ninth-place Winnipeg Jets in a special qualifying round. In game one of the series, Gaudreau scored his first playoff goal since 2015, helping the Flames win the game 4–1. After ousting the Jets 3–1 in the qualifying round, the Flames faced the Dallas Stars in the first round. Gaudreau again struggled to produce in the playoffs, and the Flames lost the series four games to two.

During the COVID-19 pandemic, the NHL realigned its divisions temporarily for a shortened 2020–21 season. To eliminate cross-border travel, all seven Canadian teams played in the North Division. The year began slowly for Gaudreau, and further difficulties arose when coach Geoff Ward was replaced midway through the season by Darryl Sutter. Adjusting to Sutter's style was challenging, and Gaudreau posted only seven points in a span of 15 games following the switch. However, his scoring improved dramatically during the final months of the regular season, alongside general improvement of the team. He recorded his 300th career assist on a goal by teammate Sam Bennett in a game against the Edmonton Oilers. Gaudreau again lead the Flames in goals (19) and assists (30) during the season. The Flames did not qualify for the 2021 Stanley Cup playoffs, coming four points short of the Montreal Canadiens for the final berth in the North Division.

The NHL's divisions and format returned to their pre-pandemic norms for the 2021–22 season, the Flames' first full season under returning coach Sutter. It would be one of the most successful regular seasons in team history, with Gaudreau at the center of its success. With centreman Elias Lindholm and Matthew Tkachuk on the right wing, he formed one of the most dominant forward lines in the NHL, and all three members hit numerous personal and collective milestones throughout the season. On April 12, he hit the 100-point mark for the first time in his career. Gaudreau scored his 40th goal of the season in an April 29 loss to the Minnesota Wild, joining Lindholm and Tkachuk in this feat, the first time in 28 years that linemates had all achieved this, and only the fourth time in that span that a team had three 40-goal scorers. He finished the season playing in all 82 contests with 40 goals and 75 assists for 115 points, finishing second overall in points standings for the Art Ross Trophy, behind only Edmonton Oilers forward and captain Connor McDavid. This was also the second-most points ever for a Flame, behind only Kent Nilsson (131) in 1980–81. Gaudreau's performance through the season led many to argue that he should be a serious candidate for the Hart Memorial Trophy, though he was ultimately not a finalist, finishing fourth in the voting. The Flames won the Pacific Division and finished sixth in the league. The Flames drew the Dallas Stars in the first round of the 2022 playoffs, a rematch of the bubble playoffs two years prior, and a matchup in which the Flames were considered the favourites. In light of disappointing results in preceding years, Gaudreau's prospective performance was the subject of considerable speculation. The Stars proved a greater challenge than many had anticipated, largely due to an exceptional performance from goaltender Jake Oettinger. After falling behind two games to one, Gaudreau scored the game-winning goal to help tie the series in game four, his first of the playoffs. His performance through the early games earned the praise of coach Sutter, who said he felt that Gaudreau had "taken that step" to perform as well in the playoffs as he had during the regular season. Gaudreau's second goal of the playoffs was also a game-winner, this time in overtime in game seven, sending the Flames through to the second round for the first time in seven years. The Flames drew the Edmonton Oilers in the second round, the first playoff "Battle of Alberta" in 31 years. The Flames were defeated by the Oilers in five games, bringing their playoff run to an end.

With the pending expiration of Gaudreau's contract, many regarded him as the top unrestricted free agent of 2022, and whether the Flames could re-sign him was a topic of considerable discussion. On July 12, 2022, the Flames announced that Gaudreau would not return to Calgary despite an aggressive internal campaign by the club to re-sign him, including a monetary package that would have made Gaudreau one of the highest paid players in the league. General Manager Brad Treliving described Gaudreau's decision as a "disappointing day, to say the very least," but noted Gaudreau's desire to move closer to his family, saying "I respect that fully. John has every right, and we have nothing but respect for John the player and John the person."

==== Columbus Blue Jackets (2022–2024) ====
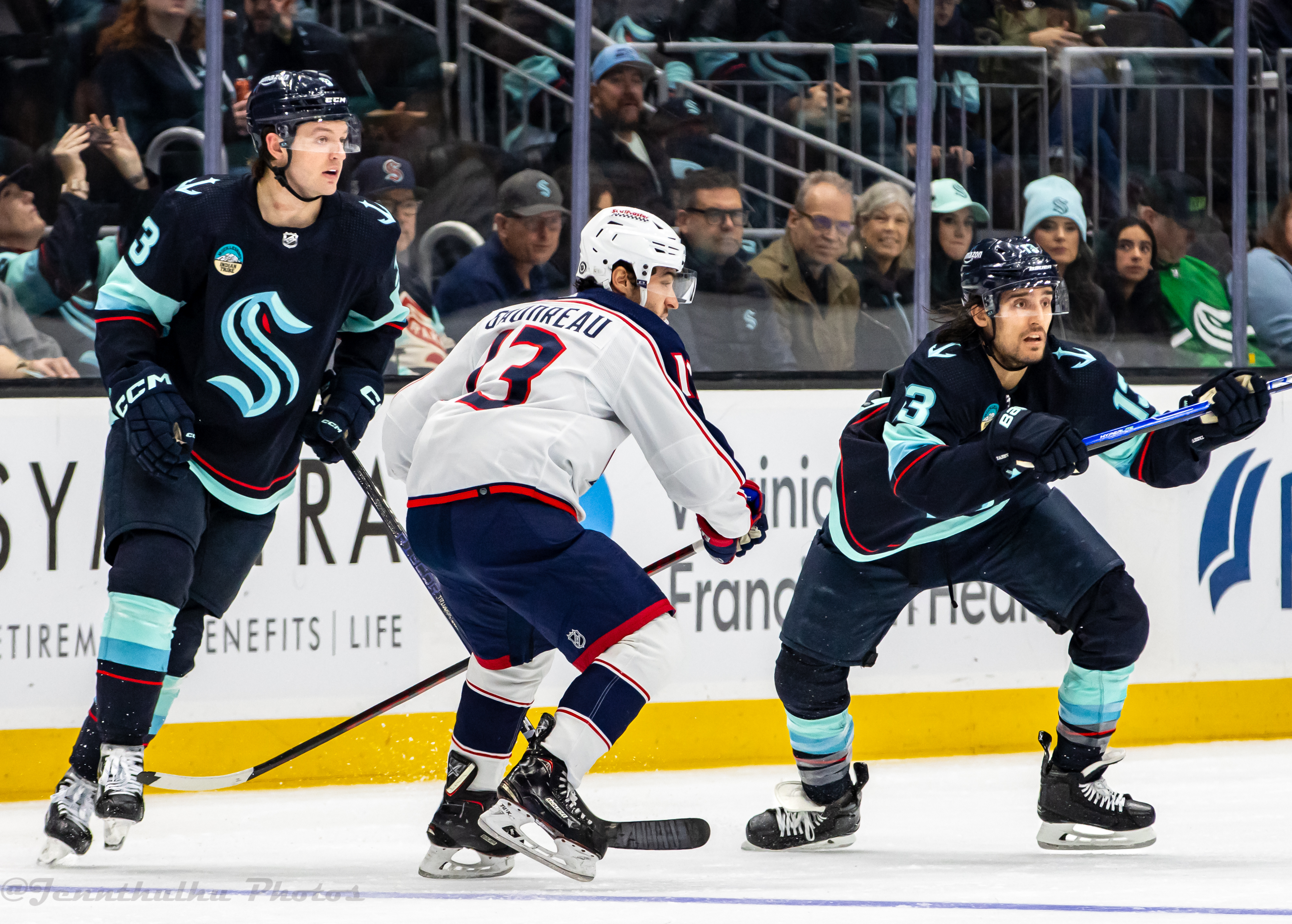
Gaudreau (center) in action with the Blue Jackets in January 2024

On July 13, 2022, the opening day of free agency, Gaudreau agreed to a seven-year, $68.25 million contract with an average annual value of $9.75 million with the Columbus Blue Jackets, accepting less money than offered by Calgary and comparable deals provided by the New Jersey Devils and New York Islanders to play for the club. His decision to sign in Columbus "stunned" the hockey world, both because it had not been among the most commonly mooted destinations beforehand and because Columbus had acquired a reputation as an undesirable destination for free agents. Blue Jackets general manager Jarmo Kekäläinen expressed the hope that with the signing "we can finally get rid of the bullshit that this is somehow a bad destination, a bad city, whatever. Because it's never been true."

Gaudreau's first season with the Blue Jackets was difficult, as injuries to key players and poor performances from many others plagued the team. Gaudreau's performance was lauded, and he was chosen to represent the team at the 2023 All-Star Game. The Blue Jackets ultimately finished 31st of 32 teams in the league, while Gaudreau had a team-leading 74 points, 22 more than second-place Patrik Laine. Despite the disappointing season, he insisted "I don't have any second thoughts. I love it here."

In the 2023–24 season, Gaudreau saw his point production decline from 74 to 60 despite again leading the Blue Jackets. The Hockey News attributed the down year in part to his lack of consistent linemates, as the Blue Jackets finished tied with Montreal both for the worst standings in the Eastern Conference and fourth-worst overall.

== International play ==
Medal record

Men's ice hockey

Representing the United States

World Championships
Bronze medal – third place	2018 Denmark	

World Junior Championships
Gold medal – first place	2013 Russia	

Ivan Hlinka Memorial Tournament
Silver medal – second place	2010 Czech Republic/Slovakia	

In 2013, Gaudreau was selected to represent the United States in the 2013 World Junior Championships. He led the tournament with seven goals and tied for the team lead with nine points as the United States won the gold medal. Highlighted by a hat-trick in the quarterfinals against the Czech Republic and another two goals against Canada in the semifinals, he was named to the tournament All-Star Team.

In 2014, Gaudreau was named to the senior United States team that played in the 2014 World Championship. He scored his first international goal as a professional in a pre-tournament game against Germany, scoring the second goal in a 3–1 victory. He scored in the first official game of the tournament, the third goal in a 5–1 victory over hosts Belarus. Although the United States bowed out of the tournament in a quarterfinals loss to the Czech Republic, Gaudreau finished the tournament 10th in scoring, with two goals and eight assists for 10 points, including a four-point performance in a 5–4 win over Germany.

In 2016, Gaudreau joined Team North America to play at the 2016 World Cup of Hockey, playing alongside other NHL stars from both the United States and Canada who were 23 years old and under at the time. He scored four points in three games, two goals, and two assists.

In 2018, Gaudreau was named to the American roster to compete at the 2018 World Championship. He scored one goal and eight assists during the tournament en route to a bronze medal for the team.

On April 19, 2019, Gaudreau was selected to represent the United States at the 2019 World Championship. He recorded only one goal and one assist in six games, with the team finishing seventh in the tournament following a quarterfinals loss to Russia.

After several years away from international play, Gaudreau was named to the United States roster for the 2024 World Championship. He recorded three goals and eight assists during the tournament, but the United States once again failed to medal, finishing in fifth after a quarterfinals loss to hosts Czechs.

== Personal life ==
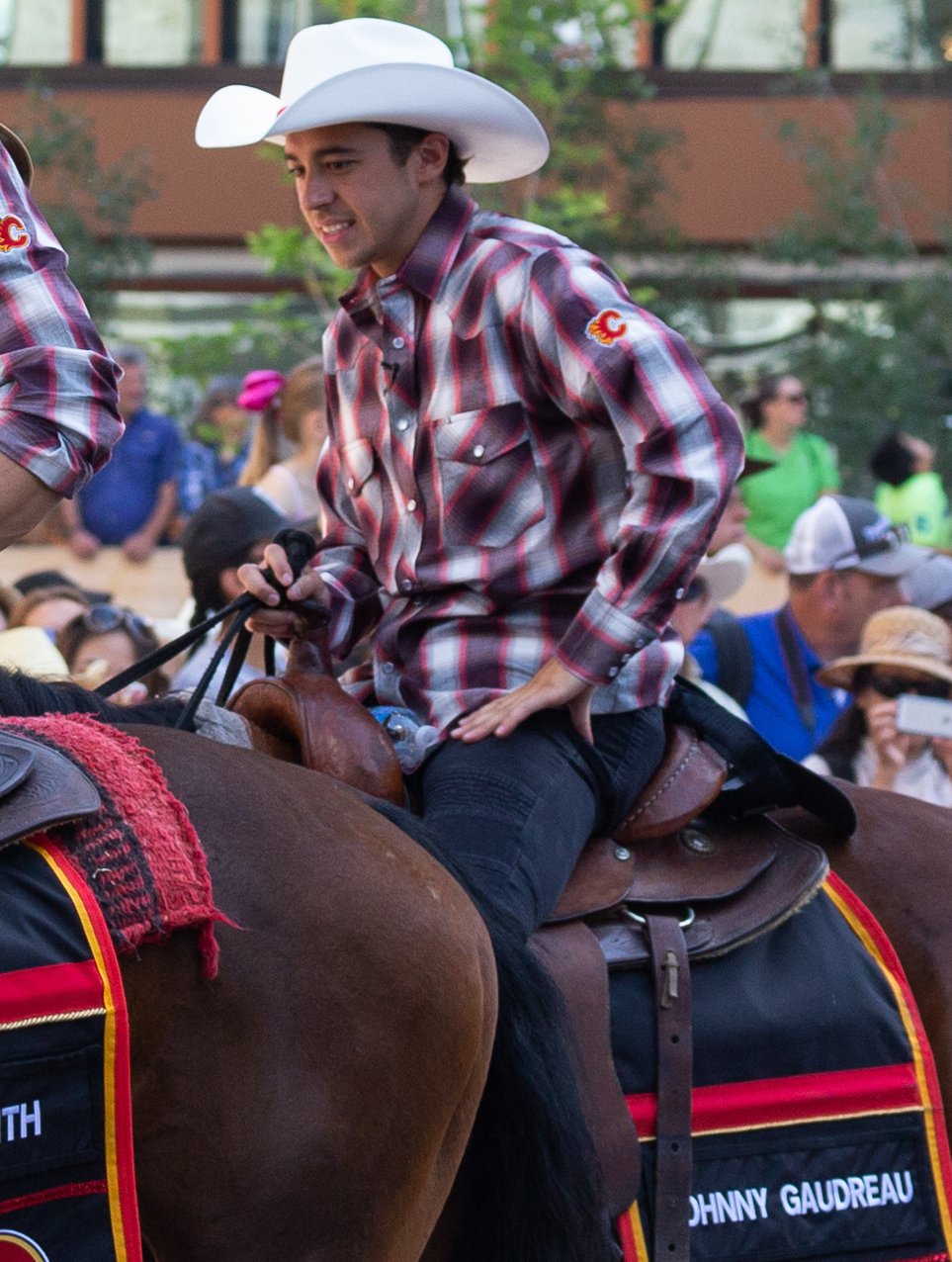
Gaudreau participating in the 2018 Calgary Stampede parade

Johnny Gaudreau's father, Guy Gaudreau, a native of Beebe Plain, Vermont, played college hockey at Norwich University, after playing high school hockey at North Country Union High School. He was inducted into the Vermont Sports Hall of Fame. He settled in southern New Jersey and spent 11 years coaching hockey at Gloucester Catholic.

Gaudreau married his wife, Meredith, in September 2021. The couple had three children. Daughter Noa was born in September 2022 and a son, Johnny Jr., was born in February 2024. On September 9, 2024, Meredith announced in her eulogy that she was pregnant with their third child (due in Spring 2025). On April 1, 2025, Meredith gave birth to Carter Michael Gaudreau. Carter was given the middle name Michael in honor of Johnny, whose middle name was also Michael.

Gaudreau's younger brother, Matthew, was also a professional hockey player and played on the Reading Royals of the ECHL. He previously played for the Bridgeport Sound Tigers of the American Hockey League (AHL) and their ECHL affiliate, the Worcester Railers. Gaudreau and his brother played together at Boston College during the 2013–14 season.

In January 2015, Johnny Gaudreau filed a trademark application for the nickname "Johnny Hockey" in Canada and the U.S. due to concerns that people would abuse his nickname for their own marketing gain.

Four months after his death, Matthew Gaudreau's wife gave birth to their child in December 2024..

== Death ==
On the evening of August 29, 2024, Gaudreau and his brother Matthew were struck and killed by a drunk driver while they were cycling in Oldmans Township, New Jersey. The Gaudreau brothers were cycling at around 8 p.m. and were hit from the rear by a motorist who was attempting to pass other vehicles on a two-lane rural highway. Police responded to the incident at 8:19 p.m.; both brothers were found dead at the scene by the time police arrived. The driver, 44-year-old Sean M. Higgins of Woodstown, was arrested for drunk driving and charged with death by auto, after telling responding officers at the scene that he had consumed "five or six" beers before driving and continued to consume alcohol while operating the car; he failed a breathalyzer test when administered by police, along with failing a field sobriety test. Rumors of the Gaudreaus' deaths began to circulate online on the evening of the collision, but their deaths were not officially announced until the following morning. The brothers had traveled to the township to attend their sister Katie's wedding, which had been scheduled to take place the following day.

Several North American sports teams, popular figures, and organizations issued tributes in reaction to his death. All 32 NHL teams issued statements in response to his death, alongside dozens of hockey players, athletes from other sports, and politicians, among them Canadian Prime Minister Justin Trudeau, Canadian Opposition Leader Pierre Poilievre, New Jersey Governor Phil Murphy, and former governor Chris Christie. Makeshift fan memorials also developed outside Nationwide Arena and the Scotiabank Saddledome, the home arenas of the Blue Jackets and Flames, respectively, as well as at the scene of the collision and notable local community sites which had a connection to the Gaudreau family. The Ohio State Buckeyes and the Columbus Crew both held moments of silence before their respective games on August 31, 2024. Similarly, the Calgary Stampeders held a 13-second moment of silence prior to their Canadian Football League (CFL) game on September 2.

On September 3, fellow American NHLer and U.S. national teammate Cole Caufield announced that he would be switching his jersey number from 22 to 13 beginning in the 2024–25 season in honor of Gaudreau, citing him as an inspiration early into his hockey career owing to his own short stature.

Both the Blue Jackets and Flames held candlelight vigils at their respective arenas on September 4; the former saw speeches from multiple players, including Blue Jackets captain Boone Jenner, Calgary and Columbus teammate Erik Gudbranson, and Cole Sillinger, with those gathered observing 13 minutes and 21 seconds of silence, in reference to Johnny's jersey no. 13 and Matthew's jersey no. 21. The Flames' vigil involved a similar 13 minutes of silence, marking the beginning of a 13-day observance at the makeshift Saddledome memorial, as well as speeches from Flames captain Mikael Backlund and Hockey Hall of Famer Lanny McDonald. On September 9, a funeral service for the Gaudreau brothers was held at St. Mary Magdalen Parish in Media, Pennsylvania. Johnny's former Calgary teammates, Sean Monahan and Andrew Mangiapane, and former Boston College teammate Kevin Hayes, served as his pallbearers.

On October 15, the Blue Jackets' opening home game of the season, the team "saved a spot for Johnny," operating a missing man formation by starting without a left winger and passing the puck to the empty spot as they observed 13 seconds of silence. The game also included a charity fundraiser, a tribute video, a memorial banner featuring his no. 13 being raised to the Nationwide Arena rafters, and a PSA against drunk driving. The Gaudreau brothers' widows, Meredith and Madeline Gaudreau, then created The John and Matthew Gaudreau Foundation to honor their husbands' legacies. The foundation's mission is to "promote and expand youth hockey opportunities, help hockey families facing tragedies, as well as help families that are, unfortunately, also affected by drunk driving, like ours."

On September 13, 2024, Higgins was ordered to remain in jail. He was officially indicted on December 11, 2024, and pled not guilty at his arraignment on January 7, 2025. The defense filed a motion to dismiss the charges on February 5, 2025, in part based on "failure to present a prima facie case." On April 15, the charges were upheld by the judge presiding over the case. The defense has rejected a plea bargain, and in January 2026, the judge denied an appeal motion by the defense. A virtual hearing was held on February 24, with a pretrial conference held on April 14, 2026. On October 19, a trial date was set for January 4, 2027, with jury selection beginning in early December of 2026.

== Legacy ==
During both the 4 Nations Face-Off and the 2025 IIHF World Championship, Gaudreau was honored by the U.S. team, for whom he had previously played. At the 4 Nations Face-Off, he was given a dedicated locker stall featuring his jersey, which was awarded to the team's player of the game following each win. Before the final against Canada, Mike Eruzione, captain of the 1980 gold medal-winning "Miracle on Ice" team and honorary captain for the event, wore a Gaudreau jersey.

At the 2025 IIHF World Championship, the U.S. team also carried a Gaudreau jersey throughout the tournament. After winning their first gold medal in 92 years at the World Championship, the team held the jersey while accepting the trophy.

At the 2026 Winter Olympics, the American team again kept a No. 13 Gaudreau sweater with them, and his surviving family attended games during the tournament. Following the United States' overtime victory over Canada to win the gold medal, players skated with Gaudreau's jersey during celebrations and later included his children in the team photograph after the medal ceremony.

== Career statistics ==
Career statistics derived from Elite Prospects.

=== Regular season and playoffs ===
			Regular season					Playoffs
Season	Team	League	GP	G	A	Pts	PIM	GP	G	A	Pts	PIM
2009–10	Gloucester Catholic High School	HS-NJ	14	21	27	48	—	—	—	—	—	—
2010–11	Dubuque Fighting Saints	USHL	60	36	36	72	36	11	5	6	11	6
2011–12	Boston College	HE	44	21	23	44	10	—	—	—	—	—
2012–13	Boston College	HE	35	21	30	51	29	—	—	—	—	—
2013–14	Boston College	HE	40	36	44	80	14	—	—	—	—	—
2013–14	Calgary Flames	NHL	1	1	0	1	0	—	—	—	—	—
2014–15	Calgary Flames	NHL	80	24	40	64	14	11	4	5	9	6
2015–16	Calgary Flames	NHL	79	30	48	78	18	—	—	—	—	—
2016–17	Calgary Flames	NHL	72	18	43	61	4	4	0	2	2	0
2017–18	Calgary Flames	NHL	80	24	60	84	26	—	—	—	—	—
2018–19	Calgary Flames	NHL	82	36	63	99	24	5	0	1	1	2
2019–20	Calgary Flames	NHL	70	18	40	58	12	10	4	3	7	0
2020–21	Calgary Flames	NHL	56	19	30	49	6	—	—	—	—	—
2021–22	Calgary Flames	NHL	82	40	75	115	26	12	3	11	14	2
2022–23	Columbus Blue Jackets	NHL	80	21	53	74	22	—	—	—	—	—
2023–24	Columbus Blue Jackets	NHL	81	12	48	60	22	—	—	—	—	—
NHL totals			763	243	500	743	176	42	11	22	33	10

=== International ===
Year	Team	Event	Result	GP	G	A	Pts	PIM
2010	United States	U18	2nd place, silver medalist(s)	5	2	2	4	0
2013	United States	WJC	1st place, gold medalist(s)	7	7	2	9	4
2014	United States	WC	6th	8	2	8	10	2
2016	Team North America	WCH	5th	3	2	2	4	0
2017	United States	WC	5th	8	6	5	11	0
2018	United States	WC	3rd place, bronze medalist(s)	10	1	8	9	12
2019	United States	WC	7th	6	1	1	2	2
2024	United States	WC	5th	8	3	8	11	0
Junior totals				12	9	4	13	4
Senior totals				43	15	32	47	16

== Awards and honors ==
Award	Year	Ref
USHL
USHL Rookie of the Year	2011	
All-USHL Second Team	2011	
USHL All-Star	2011	
College
Beanpot Most Valuable Player	2012	
Bill Flynn Trophy – Hockey East Tournament Most Valuable Player	2012	
Hockey East All-Tournament Team	2012	
All-Hockey East Rookie Team	2012	
NCAA champion	2012	
Hockey East Player of the Year	2013, 2014	
All-Hockey East First Team	2013, 2014	
AHCA East First Team All-American	2013, 2014	
Walter Brown Award	2014	
Hobey Baker Award	2014	
NHL
NHL All-Star Game	2015, 2016, 2017, 2018, 2019, 2022, 2023	
NHL All-Rookie Team	2015	
Lady Byng Memorial Trophy	2017	
NHL First All-Star Team	2022	
International
World Junior Championships All-Star	2013	

== See also ==
- List of ice hockey players who died during their careers

Awards and achievements
Preceded by Cam Atkinson	William Flynn Tournament Most Valuable Player; 2012	Succeeded by Connor Hellebuyck
Preceded by Spencer Abbott	Hockey East Player of the Year; 2012–13, 2013–14	Succeeded by Jack Eichel
Preceded by Spencer Abbott	Hockey East Scoring Champion; 2012–13, 2013–14	Succeeded by Jack Eichel
Preceded by Rylan Schwartz	NCAA Ice Hockey Scoring Champion; 2013–14	Succeeded by Jack Eichel
Preceded by Drew LeBlanc	Hobey Baker Award; 2013–14	Succeeded by Jack Eichel
Preceded by Anže Kopitar	Lady Byng Memorial Trophy; 2017	Succeeded by William Karlsson
