= Bobby Butler (ice hockey) =

American ice hockey player (born 1987)

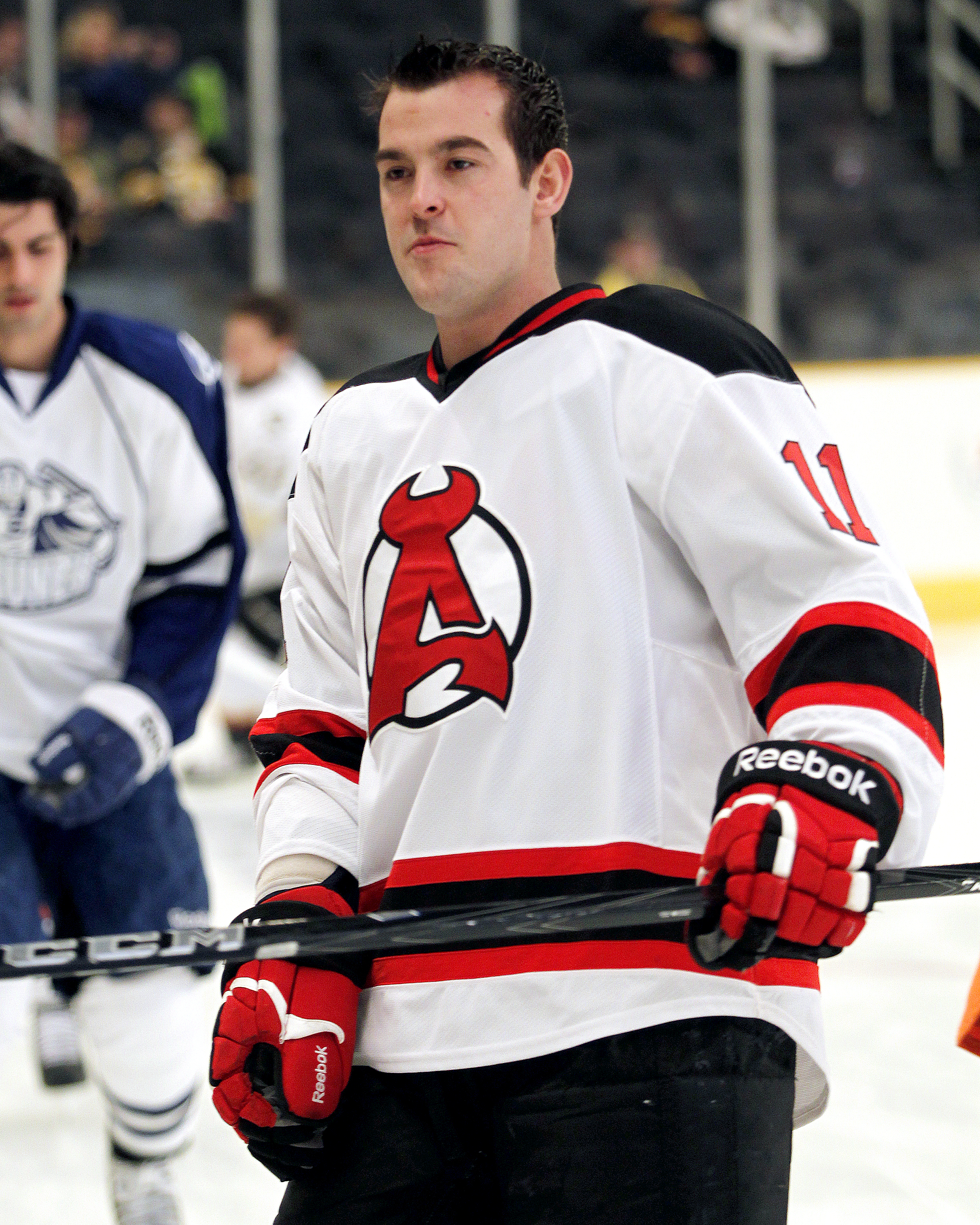
- Butler with the Albany Devils
- Born: April 26, 1987 (age 39) Marlborough, Massachusetts, U.S.
- Height: 6 ft 0 in (183 cm)
- Weight: 189 lb (86 kg; 13 st 7 lb)
- Position: Right wing
- Shot: Right
- Played for: Ottawa Senators; New Jersey Devils; Nashville Predators; Florida Panthers; Modo Hockey; Medveščak Zagreb; Torpedo Nizhny Novgorod
- National team: United States
- NHL draft: Undrafted
- Playing career: 2010–2019; 2022–2023

Robert "Bobby" Butler (born April 26, 1987) is an American former professional ice hockey forward. He played in the National Hockey League (NHL) with the Ottawa Senators, New Jersey Devils, Nashville Predators and Florida Panthers and won the 2011 Calder Cup championship while with the Binghamton Senators.

== Playing career ==
=== Amateur ===
As a youth, Butler played in the 2000 Quebec International Pee-Wee Hockey Tournament with the Minuteman Flames minor ice hockey team, and then in the 2001 tournament with the Middlesex Islanders.

Prior to enrolling at the University of New Hampshire (UNH), Butler played three seasons with the Boston Jr. Bruins of the Eastern Junior Hockey League from 2003 to 2006 and five seasons with Marlborough High School from 2000 to 2005, making the varsity team as an eighth-grader. During the 2004–05 season, he helped both his high school team and junior team to championship titles. At Marlborough High School (MHS), Butler recorded 284 points in 116 games as well as breaking the school's record in goals scored during his junior year, tallying 58 goals in 25 games. While at MHS, he played for his father, who coached the team for 25 years, retiring in 2011. Butler's MHS hockey point totals are celebrated in a prominent banner at the Navin Rink in Marlborough, which celebrates former MHS players that accumulated more than 100 points during their high school careers.

Butler capped a standout four-year college career by being named the New Hampshire Wildcats' co-captain and finishing second among all NCAA Division I players in goals in 2009 – 10, scoring 29 for UNH, earning him a nomination as a finalist for the Hobey Baker Award as the top U.S. college hockey player.

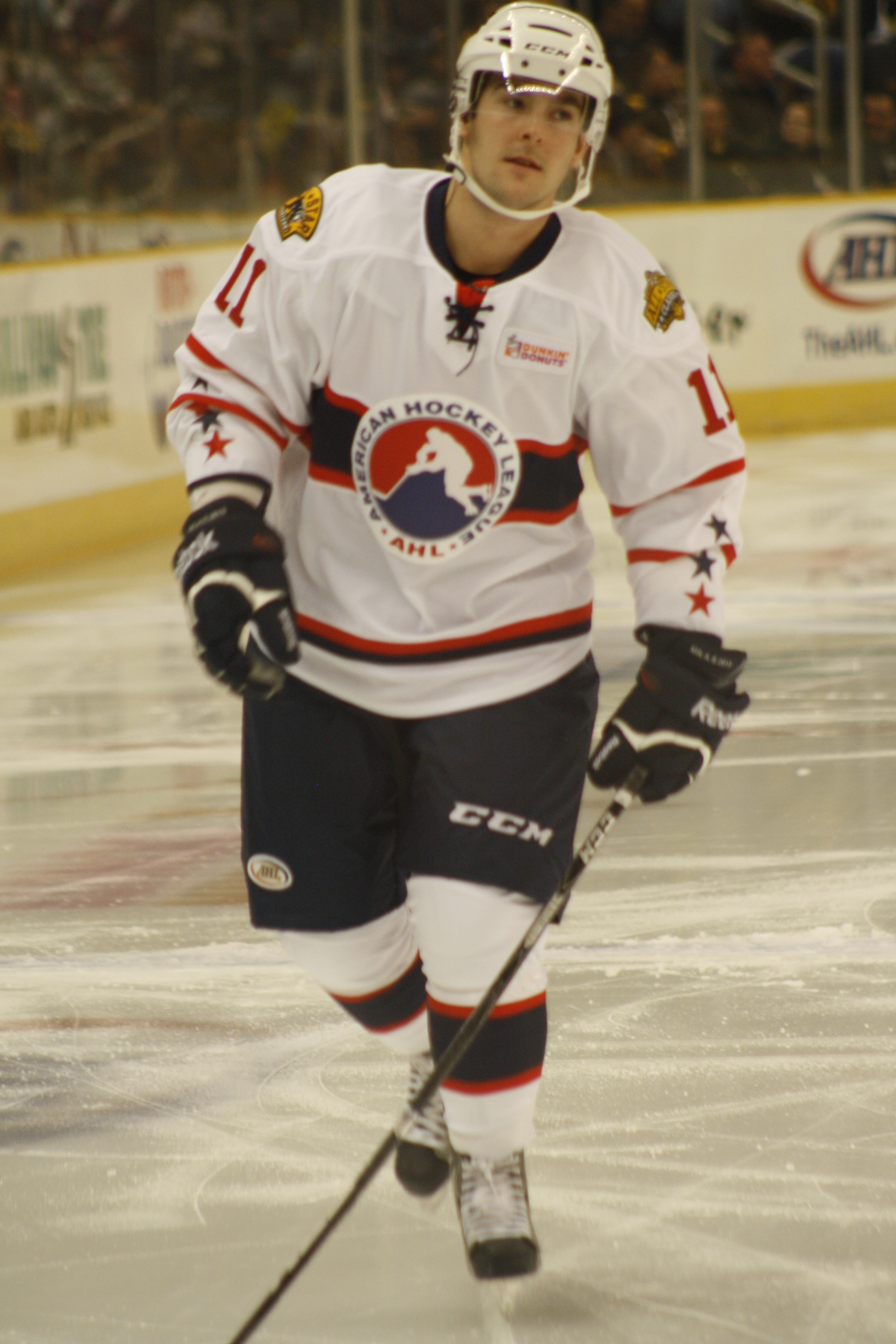
Butler at the 2013 AHL All-Star Game.

The Wildcats went 87–49–17 with him in the lineup and also qualified for the NCAA Tournament all four seasons that he was enrolled at the school. On March 24, 2010, Butler was recognized as the 58th recipient of the Walter Brown Award, which is presented annually to the best American-born college hockey player in New England. He was also selected as Hockey East's Player of the Year, an All-Hockey East First Team honoree, the Hockey East Player of the month for November, the Hockey East scoring champion, a Hockey East Three Stars Award winner and a 2010 Hockey Humanitarian nominee for his efforts in the community. He recorded 61 goals, 60 assists and 88 penalty minutes over his four-year, 153-game collegiate career at New Hampshire.

=== Professional ===
On March 29, 2010, he signed a two-year contract with the Ottawa Senators of the National Hockey League. He made his NHL debut with Ottawa on April 1 in a 4–3 shootout win against the Carolina Hurricanes. After attending the 2010 training camp, Butler was assigned to the Binghamton Senators.

Butler scored his first NHL goal against Nikolai Khabibulin of the Edmonton Oilers on February 12, 2011, and recorded his first assist in the same game, on a goal by Milan Michálek. After spending the remainder of the season in Ottawa and recording 10 goals and 11 assists in 36 games, he was returned to Binghamton where he helped lead the club to a Calder Cup victory, notching 13 goals and 7 assists during the 23 game playoff.

On July 14, 2011, he was rewarded for his solid 2010–11 season with a two-year, one-way contract with the Ottawa Senators. However, Butler responded with a much poorer 2011–12 season than expected, registering only 6 goals and 16 points in 56 games. As a result, in July 2012 the Senators placed Butler on waivers with the intent of buying out his contract. On July 27, 2012, the Senators announced that his contract had been bought out, making Butler a free agent.

On August 9, 2012, Butler signed a one-year, two-way contract with the New Jersey Devils organization. With the 2012 NHL lockout in effect, he was directly assigned to AHL affiliate, the Albany Devils. Upon commencement of the shortened 2012–13 season, Butler was recalled to New Jersey and made his Devils debut against the New York Islanders at the Nassau Veterans Memorial Coliseum on February 3, 2013. Butler scored his only goal with the Devils against the Pittsburgh Penguins on February 9. After registering 2 points in 14 games with the Devils Butler was placed on waivers by the Devils and claimed by the Nashville Predators on March 4, 2013.

On June 14, 2013, he was traded to the Florida Panthers in exchange for T.J. Brennan.

On July 15, 2015, Butler signed his first contract abroad in agreeing to a two-year contract with Swedish club, Modo Hockey of the SHL. However, he parted ways with Modo after one year and then headed to Medveščak Zagreb of the Kontinental Hockey League (KHL), where he started the 2016-17 campaign. In December 2016, after having played in 37 games (six goals, ten assists) for Zagreb, he transferred to fellow KHL outfit Torpedo Nizhny Novgorod.

As a free agent in the following off-season, Butler returned to North America and opted to sign a one-year AHL contract with the Milwaukee Admirals on August 10, 2017. In the 2017–18 season, Butler led the Admirals with 24 goals and finished second with 45 points through 62 games.

He continued his career in the AHL following the conclusion of the season, signing a one-year contract with the Hartford Wolf Pack, affiliate of the New York Rangers, on July 2, 2018.

During his coaching tenure, Butler opted to return to the professional circuit, initially playing a one-off appearance with the Worcester Railers of the ECHL on January 2, 2022, earning first-star honours with three points in a 5–3 victory over the Reading Royals. On January 21, 2022, Butler opted to sign a contract for the remainder of the season with the Railers, finishing with 16 points through 20 games.

Following two years with the Railers, appearing as captain in his second season, Bulter announced his retirement from professional hockey on August 16, 2023.

== Coaching career ==
While in his final two seasons within the AHL, Butler transitioned to coaching in originally performing as the Director of player development with the Boston Junior Bruins from 2017 to 2019. He ceased his professional career from 2019 to 2022, performing as the Director of Hockey Operations for the Worcester Jr. Railers and as an NCAA volunteer assistant coach with the Holy Cross.

== International play ==
Medal record

Ice hockey

Representing the United States

Ice Hockey World Championships
Bronze medal – third place	2013 Sweden/Finland	

Butler represented Team USA in the 2013 World Championship with three goals and one assist for four points to help Team USA win the bronze medal.

On January 1, 2018, it was announced that Butler would represent the United States at the 2018 Winter Olympics. He went scoreless over 5 games as Team USA finished in 7th place.

== Career statistics ==
=== Regular season and playoffs ===
			Regular season					Playoffs
Season	Team	League	GP	G	A	Pts	PIM	GP	G	A	Pts	PIM
2002–03	Boston Little Bruins	18U AAA	35	21	27	48	12	—	—	—	—	—
2002–03	Boston Jr. Bruins	EJHL	13	1	3	4	0	—	—	—	—	—
2003–04	Boston Little Bruins	18U AAA	7	4	6	10	4	—	—	—	—	—
2003–04	Boston Jr. Bruins	EJHL	59	15	18	33	28	—	—	—	—	—
2004–05	Boston Jr. Bruins	EJHL	49	18	14	32	36	—	—	—	—	—
2005–06	Boston Jr. Bruins	EJHL	44	22	22	44	42	4	2	2	4	8
2006–07	University of New Hampshire	HE	38	9	3	12	12	—	—	—	—	—
2007–08	University of New Hampshire	HE	38	14	12	26	20	—	—	—	—	—
2008–09	University of New Hampshire	HE	38	9	21	30	36	—	—	—	—	—
2009–10	University of New Hampshire	HE	39	29	24	53	20	—	—	—	—	—
2009–10	Ottawa Senators	NHL	2	0	0	0	0	—	—	—	—	—
2010–11	Binghamton Senators	AHL	47	22	11	33	35	23	13	4	17	6
2010–11	Ottawa Senators	NHL	36	10	11	21	10	—	—	—	—	—
2011–12	Ottawa Senators	NHL	56	6	10	16	12	3	0	0	0	0
2012–13	Albany Devils	AHL	37	16	11	27	8	—	—	—	—	—
2012–13	New Jersey Devils	NHL	14	1	1	2	0	—	—	—	—	—
2012–13	Nashville Predators	NHL	20	3	6	9	4	—	—	—	—	—
2013–14	San Antonio Rampage	AHL	69	22	25	47	12	—	—	—	—	—
2013–14	Florida Panthers	NHL	2	0	1	1	2	—	—	—	—	—
2014–15	San Antonio Rampage	AHL	68	27	32	59	37	—	—	—	—	—
2015–16	Modo Hockey	SHL	49	10	9	19	16	—	—	—	—	—
2016–17	KHL Medveščak Zagreb	KHL	37	6	10	16	10	—	—	—	—	—
2016–17	Torpedo Nizhny Novgorod	KHL	13	1	4	5	4	2	0	0	0	4
2017–18	Milwaukee Admirals	AHL	67	24	21	45	36	—	—	—	—	—
2018–19	Hartford Wolf Pack	AHL	69	8	12	20	20	—	—	—	—	—
2021–22	Worcester Railers	ECHL	20	6	10	16	4	—	—	—	—	—
2022–23	Worcester Railers	ECHL	63	17	21	38	50	—	—	—	—	—
NHL totals			130	20	29	49	28	3	0	0	0	0

=== International ===
Year	Team	Event	Result	GP	G	A	Pts	PIM
2013	United States	WC	3rd place, bronze medalist(s)	8	3	1	4	2
2018	United States	OG	7th	5	0	0	0	0
Senior totals				13	3	1	4	2

== Awards and honors ==
Award	Year
College
HE All-Tournament Team	2008
All-HE First Team	2009–10
AHCA East First-Team All-American	2009–10
Finalist Hobey Baker Award	2010
AHL
MVP All-Star Classic	2011

Awards and achievements
Preceded by Brad Thiessen	Hockey East Player of the Year; 2009–10	Succeeded by Paul Thompson
Preceded by Brad Thiessen	Hockey East Three-Stars Award; 2009–10	Succeeded by Paul Thompson
Preceded by Colin Wilson; James Marcou	Hockey East Scoring Champion; 2009–10; With: Gustav Nyquist	Succeeded by Paul Thompson
