= Hockey East Player of the Year =

Annual ice hockey award

- Sport: Ice hockey
- Awarded for: A player that has demonstrated superior play and leadership for his team.

History
- First award: 1985
- Most recent: Michael Hrabal

The Hockey East Player of the Year is an annual award given out at the conclusion of the Hockey East regular season to the best player in the conference as voted by the coaches of each Hockey East team.

The Player of the Year was first awarded in 1985 and every year thereafter. Three players (Greg Brown, Chris Drury, and Johnny Gaudreau) have received the award two separate times, all doing so in consecutive years. The award has been shared three times, in 1999–00, 2002–03 and in 2015–16.

== Award winners ==
Year	Winner	Position	School	Ref
1984–85	Chris Terreri	Goaltender	Providence	
1985–86	Scott Harlow	Left Wing	Boston College	
1986–87	Brian Leetch	Defenceman	Boston College	
1987–88	Mike McHugh	Left Wing	Maine	
1988–89	Greg Brown	Defenceman	Boston College	
1989–90	Greg Brown	Defenceman	Boston College	
1990–91	David Emma	Right Wing	Boston College	
1991–92	Scott Pellerin	Left Wing	Maine	
1992–93	Paul Kariya	Left Wing	Maine	
1993–94	Dwayne Roloson	Goaltender	UMass Lowell	
1994–95	Chris Imes	Defenceman	Maine	
1995–96	Jay Pandolfo	Left Wing	Boston University	
1996–97	Chris Drury	Left Wing	Boston University	
1997–98	Chris Drury	Left Wing	Boston University	
1998–99	Jason Krog	Center	New Hampshire	
1999–00	Ty Conklin	Goaltender	New Hampshire	
1999–00	Mike Mottau	Defenceman	Boston College	
2000–01	Brian Gionta	Right Wing	Boston College	
2001–02	Darren Haydar	Right Wing	New Hampshire	
2002–03	Mike Ayers	Goaltender	New Hampshire	
2002–03	Ben Eaves	Center	Boston College	
2003–04	Steve Saviano	Left Wing	New Hampshire	
2004–05	Patrick Eaves	Right Wing	Boston College	

Year	Winner	Position	School	Ref
2005–06	Chris Collins	Left Wing	Boston College	
2006–07	John Curry	Goaltender	Boston University	
2007–08	Kevin Regan	Goaltender	New Hampshire	
2008–09	Brad Thiessen	Goaltender	Northeastern	
2009–10	Bobby Butler	Right Wing	New Hampshire	
2010–11	Paul Thompson	Right Wing	New Hampshire	
2011–12	Spencer Abbott	Right Wing	Maine	
2012–13	Johnny Gaudreau	Left Wing	Boston College	
2013–14	Johnny Gaudreau	Left Wing	Boston College	
2014–15	Jack Eichel	Center	Boston University	
2015–16	Thatcher Demko	Goaltender	Boston College	
2015–16	Kevin Boyle	Goaltender	UMass Lowell	
2016–17	Zach Aston-Reese	Forward	Northeastern	
2017–18	Adam Gaudette	Center	Northeastern	
2018–19	Cale Makar	Defenceman	Massachusetts	
2019–20	Jeremy Swayman	Goaltender	Maine	
2020–21	Spencer Knight	Goaltender	Boston College	
2021–22	Bobby Trivigno	Center	Massachusetts	
2022–23	Devon Levi	Goaltender	Northeastern	
2023–24	Macklin Celebrini	Center	Boston University	
2024–25	Ryan Leonard	Center	Boston College	
2025–26	Michael Hrabal	Goaltender	Massachusetts	

=== Winners by school ===
School	Winners
Boston College	15
New Hampshire	8
Boston University	6
Maine	6
Northeastern	4
Massachusetts	3
UMass Lowell	2
Providence	1

=== Winners by position ===
Position	Winners
Center	7
Right Wing	7
Left Wing	11
Forward	1
Defenceman	6
Goaltender	13

== See also ==
- Hockey East Awards
