= Paul Thompson (ice hockey, born 1988) =

American ice hockey player

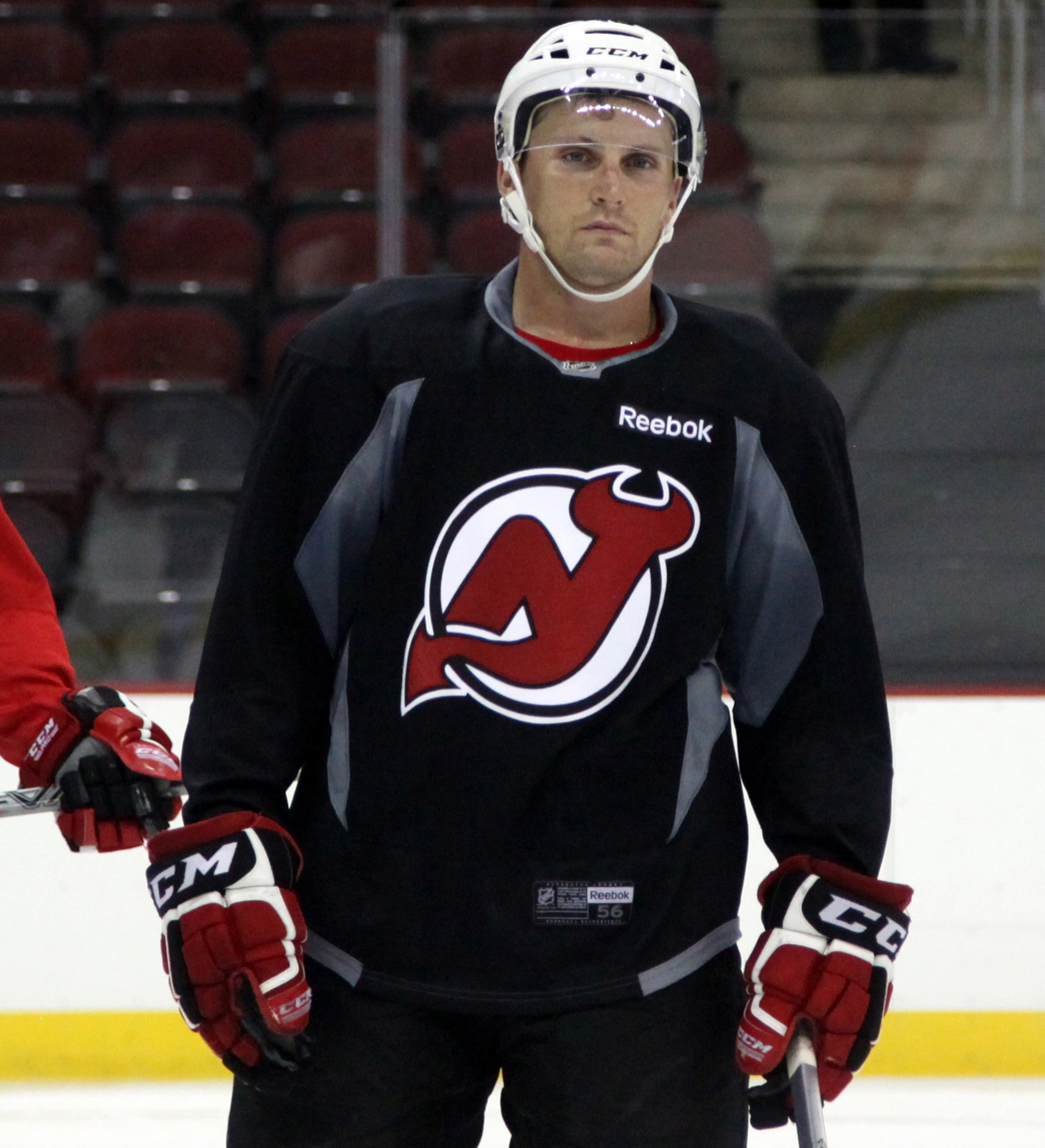
- Born: November 30, 1988 (age 37) Derry, New Hampshire, U.S.
- Height: 6 ft 0 in (183 cm)
- Weight: 210 lb (95 kg; 15 st 0 lb)
- Position: Right wing
- Shot: Right
- Played for: WBS Penguins; Springfield Falcons; New Jersey Devils; Florida Panthers; Chicago Wolves; Hartford Wolf Pack; Bridgeport Islanders
- NHL draft: Undrafted
- Playing career: 2011–2023

Paul Thompson (born November 30, 1988) is an American former ice hockey forward. During the 2010–11 season, he was the Hockey East player of the year, led the Hockey East in scoring, and then led the nation in power play goals while playing with the University of New Hampshire.

== Playing career ==
Born in Derry, New Hampshire, Thompson began playing hockey at age five. He became a fan of the UNH hockey team while his elder cousin, Mike Souza, played on the team. He later attended Pinkerton Academy where he played hockey his freshman and sophomore year. While at Pinkerton he also played Baseball and Football. The next two years he played for the New Hampshire Junior Monarchs of the Eastern Junior Hockey League. After scoring fifty one goals in fifty games in the 2006–07 season, Thompson was named the EJHL Offensive Player of the Year. In 2007, he was ranked seventy second among North American hockey players by the NHL Central Scouting Bureau. He was the highest ranked North American player to not be selected in the NHL entry draft that year.

He then attended the University of New Hampshire where he is a Health Management major. Thompson scored his first college hat trick on November 17, 2007, in a game against Providence College. In the 2009–10 season he scored thirty nine points, second on the team to Bobby Butler. Thompson is now the highest scoring New Hampshire native on the UNH ice hockey team in the past thirty years. He is a finalist for the 2011 Hobey Baker Award.

In March 2011 he signed a two-year contract with the Pittsburgh Penguins organization. He then began playing for the Wilkes-Barre/Scranton Penguins.

On February 6, 2014, Thompson was traded by the Penguins to the Columbus Blue Jackets in exchange for Spencer Machacek.

As a free agent in the off-season, Thompson signed a one-year AHL contract with the Albany Devils. Prior to the 2014–15 season, he attended NHL parent club, the New Jersey Devils training camp.

On July 1, 2015, Thompson signed a two-year, two-way free agent contract with the New Jersey Devils. To begin the 2015–16 season, Thompson was returned to continue his tenure with the Albany Devils in the AHL. On January 8, 2016, Thompson received his first NHL recall by the Devils, and made his debut that night in a 4–1 defeat to the Boston Bruins. After three scoreless games with New Jersey, Thompson was reassigned to Albany to finish the season, compiling 35 points in 56 games.

On June 10, 2016, the New Jersey Devils traded Thompson along with teammate Graham Black to the Florida Panthers in exchange of Marc Savard's contract and a second-round pick in 2018 NHL Entry Draft.

On July 1, 2017, having left the Panthers as a free agent, Thompson agreed to a one-year, two-way contract with expansion club, the Vegas Golden Knights. In the 2017–18 season, Thompson was reassigned by the Golden Knights to AHL affiliate, the Chicago Wolves, for the duration of the year. He played in every regular season game with the Wolves, posting 24 goals and 38 points.

On July 2, 2018, Thompson opted to return to the Florida Panthers organization as a free agent, securing a two-year, two-way deal.

After concluding his contract within the Panthers organization and Springfield Thunderbirds, Thompson left as a free agent to continue his career in the AHL by signing with the Hartford Wolf Pack, affiliate of the New York Rangers on October 10, 2020.

As a free agent, Thompson extended his career in the following 2021–22 season, agreeing to a one-year AHL contract with Bridgeport Islanders and assigned to ECHL affiliate, the Worcester Railers, on October 19, 2021.

In October 2023, Thompson announced his retirement from professional hockey.

== Coaching career ==
In 2023, Thompson joined JR Zavisza's staff as an assistant coach at Loomis Chaffee, a preparatory boarding school in Connecticut. Thompson replaced Steve Novodor, who left to become the women's head coach at Albertus Magnus.

== Career statistics ==
			Regular season					Playoffs
Season	Team	League	GP	G	A	Pts	PIM	GP	G	A	Pts	PIM
2005–06	New Hampshire Junior Monarchs	EJHL	38	13	17	30	20	—	—	—	—	—
2006–07	New Hampshire Junior Monarchs	EJHL	44	45	38	83	56	—	—	—	—	—
2007–08	University of New Hampshire	HE	35	6	6	12	22	—	—	—	—	—
2008–09	University of New Hampshire	HE	27	4	5	9	22	—	—	—	—	—
2009–10	University of New Hampshire	HE	39	19	20	39	24	—	—	—	—	—
2010–11	University of New Hampshire	HE	39	28	24	52	32	—	—	—	—	—
2010–11	Wilkes-Barre/Scranton Penguins	AHL	6	1	2	3	2	4	0	1	1	2
2011–12	Wilkes-Barre/Scranton Penguins	AHL	67	10	15	25	37	12	2	1	3	2
2011–12	Wheeling Nailers	ECHL	1	1	1	2	0	—	—	—	—	—
2012–13	Wilkes-Barre/Scranton Penguins	AHL	58	20	9	29	84	15	3	3	6	21
2013–14	Wilkes-Barre/Scranton Penguins	AHL	39	4	3	7	50	—	—	—	—	—
2013–14	Springfield Falcons	AHL	30	4	4	8	50	5	0	0	0	5
2014–15	Albany Devils	AHL	73	33	22	55	67	—	—	—	—	—
2015–16	Albany Devils	AHL	56	13	22	35	96	10	3	1	4	16
2015–16	New Jersey Devils	NHL	3	0	0	0	2	—	—	—	—	—
2016–17	Springfield Thunderbirds	AHL	51	19	23	42	57	—	—	—	—	—
2016–17	Florida Panthers	NHL	21	0	3	3	22	—	—	—	—	—
2017–18	Chicago Wolves	AHL	76	24	14	38	108	3	0	0	0	2
2018–19	Springfield Thunderbirds	AHL	72	26	27	53	111	—	—	—	—	—
2019–20	Springfield Thunderbirds	AHL	54	13	15	28	70	—	—	—	—	—
2020–21	Hartford Wolf Pack	AHL	24	6	9	15	40	—	—	—	—	—
2021–22	Worcester Railers	ECHL	10	2	3	5	12	—	—	—	—	—
2021–22	Bridgeport Islanders	AHL	32	6	8	14	53	—	—	—	—	—
2022–23	Bridgeport Islanders	AHL	59	13	8	21	107	—	—	—	—	—
NHL totals			24	0	3	3	24	—	—	—	—	—

== Awards and honors ==
Award	Year
College
All-Hockey East First Team	2010–11
AHCA East First-Team All-American	2010–11

Awards and achievements
Preceded by Bobby Butler	Hockey East Player of the Year; 2010–11	Succeeded by Spencer Abbott
Preceded by Bobby Butler; Gustav Nyquist	Hockey East Scoring Champion; 2010–11	Succeeded by Spencer Abbott
Preceded by Bobby Butler	Hockey East Three-Stars Award; 2010–11	Succeeded by Kieran Millan
