= Hockey East Scoring Champion =

Annual ice hockey award

- Sport: Ice hockey
- Awarded for: To the skater with the most points scored in conference games during the season.

History
- First award: 1985
- Most recent: Ryan Leonard (37 points) (Boston College)

The Hockey East Scoring Champion is an annual award given out at the conclusion of the Hockey East regular season to the skater who scored the most points in conference games during the regular season.

The Scoring Champion was first awarded in 1985 and every year thereafter. It was shared four times, between Tom Nolan and Marty Reasoner in 1998, Ryan Shannon and Tony Voce in 2004, James Marcou and Colin Wilson in 2009, and Bobby Butler and Gustav Nyquist in 2010.

In 2022–23, Lane Hutson became the first Defenceman to win the award in league history. The current record for most points scored in conference play during a season is 74 points, held by Craig Janney of Boston College, set in 1987.

Only David Emma, Chris Drury and Johnny Gaudreau have won the award twice, all in consecutive years.

== Award winners ==
Year	Winner	Position	School	Points
1984–85	Tim Army	Forward	Providence	60
1985–86	Scott Harlow	Left Wing	Boston College	67
1986–87	Craig Janney	Center	Boston College	74
1987–88	Dave Capuano	Forward	Maine	59
1988–89	Tim Sweeney	Left Wing	Boston College	48
1989–90	David Emma	Right Wing	Boston College	44
1990–91	David Emma	Right Wing	Boston College	51
1991–92	Mike Boback	Forward	Providence	39
1992–93	Paul Kariya	Left Wing	Maine	63
1993–94	Mike Pomichter	Forward	Boston University	33
1994–95	Greg Bullock	Forward	UMass Lowell	47
1995–96	Chris Drury	Center	Boston University	42
1996–97	Chris Drury	Center	Boston University	41
1997–98	Marty Reasoner	Center	Boston College	42
1997–98	Tom Nolan	Forward	New Hampshire	42
1998–99	Jason Krog	Center	New Hampshire	53
1999–00	Cory Larose	Center	Maine	33
2000–01	Brian Gionta	Right Wing	Boston College	35
2001–02	Darren Haydar	Right Wing	New Hampshire	42
2002–03	Ben Eaves	Center	Boston College	42
2003–04	Ryan Shannon	Center	Boston College	27
2003–04	Tony Voce	Left Wing	Boston College	27
2004–05	Jason Guerriero	Forward	Northeastern	34

Year	Winner	Position	School	Points
2005–06	Chris Collins	Left Wing	Boston College	39
2006–07	Brian Boyle	Center	Boston College	37
2007–08	Bryan Ewing	Center	Boston University	35
2008–09	Colin Wilson	Center	Boston University	35
2008–09	James Marcou	Forward	Massachusetts	35
2009–10	Bobby Butler	Forward	New Hampshire	41
2009–10	Gustav Nyquist	Right Wing	Maine	41
2010–11	Paul Thompson	Right Wing	New Hampshire	42
2011–12	Spencer Abbott	Forward	Maine	38
2012–13	Johnny Gaudreau	Left Wing	Boston College	36
2013–14	Johnny Gaudreau	Left Wing	Boston College	36
2014–15	Jack Eichel	Center	Boston University	44
2015–16	Andrew Poturalski	Forward	New Hampshire	31
2016–17	Tyler Kelleher	Forward	New Hampshire	37
2017–18	Adam Gaudette	Forward	Northeastern	35
2018–19	Mitchell Chaffee	Forward	Massachusetts	31
2019–20	Jack Dugan	Forward	Providence	35
2020–21	Jonny Evans	Forward	Connecticut	28
2021–22	Bobby Trivigno	Forward	Massachusetts	32
2022–23	Lane Hutson	Defenceman	Boston University	34
2023–24	Macklin Celebrini	Center	Boston University	44
2024–25	Ryan Leonard	Forward	Boston College	37

=== Winners by school ===
School	Winners
Boston College	15
Boston University	8
New Hampshire	7
Maine	4
Massachusetts	3
Providence	3
Northeastern	2
Connecticut	1
UMass Lowell	1

=== Winners by position ===
Position	Winners
Center	13
Right Wing	6
Left Wing	7
Forward	17
Defenceman	1

== See also ==
- Hockey East Awards
