= 2016–17 New Jersey Devils season =

National Hockey League season

2016–17 New Jersey Devils
- Division: 8th Metropolitan
- Conference: 16th Eastern
- 2016–17 record: 28–40–14
- Home record: 16–17–8
- Road record: 12–23–6
- Goals for: 183
- Goals against: 244

Team information
- General manager: Ray Shero
- Coach: John Hynes
- Captain: Andy Greene
- Alternate captains: Michael Cammalleri; Adam Henrique; Travis Zajac
- Arena: Prudential Center
- Average attendance: 14,567
- Minor league affiliate: Albany Devils (AHL)

Team leaders
- Goals: Kyle Palmieri (26)
- Assists: Taylor Hall (33)
- Points: Taylor Hall; Kyle Palmieri (53)
- Penalty minutes: Miles Wood (86)
- Plus/minus: Stefan Noesen (+4)
- Wins: Cory Schneider (20)
- Goals against average: Keith Kinkaid (2.64)

The 2016–17 New Jersey Devils season was the 43rd season for the National Hockey League (NHL) franchise that was established on June 11, 1974, and 35th season since the franchise relocated from Colorado prior to the 1982–83 NHL season. New Jersey did not make the postseason for the fifth consecutive year. Also, this is the first time since the 1985–86 season that the Devils finished last in the conference.

== Standings ==
Metropolitan Division
Pos	Team	GP	W	L	OTL	ROW	GF	GA	GD	Pts
1	p – Washington Capitals	82	55	19	8	53	263	182	+81	118
2	x – Pittsburgh Penguins	82	50	21	11	46	282	234	+48	111
3	x – Columbus Blue Jackets	82	50	24	8	47	249	195	+54	108
4	x – New York Rangers	82	48	28	6	45	256	220	+36	102
5	New York Islanders	82	41	29	12	39	241	242	−1	94
6	Philadelphia Flyers	82	39	33	10	32	219	236	−17	88
7	Carolina Hurricanes	82	36	31	15	33	215	236	−21	87
8	New Jersey Devils	82	28	40	14	25	183	244	−61	70

Source: National Hockey League
p – Clinched Presidents' Trophy; x – Clinched playoff spot

Eastern Conference Wild Card
Pos	Div	Team	GP	W	L	OTL	ROW	GF	GA	GD	Pts
1	ME	x – New York Rangers	82	48	28	6	45	256	220	+36	102
2	AT	x – Toronto Maple Leafs	82	40	27	15	39	251	242	+9	95
3	ME	New York Islanders	82	41	29	12	39	241	242	−1	94
4	AT	Tampa Bay Lightning	82	42	30	10	38	234	227	+7	94
5	ME	Philadelphia Flyers	82	39	33	10	32	219	236	−17	88
6	ME	Carolina Hurricanes	82	36	31	15	33	215	236	−21	87
7	AT	Florida Panthers	82	35	36	11	30	210	237	−27	81
8	AT	Detroit Red Wings	82	33	36	13	24	207	244	−37	79
9	AT	Buffalo Sabres	82	33	37	12	31	201	237	−36	78
10	ME	New Jersey Devils	82	28	40	14	25	183	244	−61	70

Source: National Hockey League
x – Clinched playoff spot

== Schedule and results ==
=== Pre-season ===
2016 Pre-season Game Log: 3–5–0 (Home: 2–1–0; Road: 1–4–0)
#	Date	Visitor	Score	Home	OT	Decision	Attendance	Record	Recap
1^{[A]}	September 26	Philadelphia	0–2	New Jersey		Kinkaid	7,415	1–0–0	Recap
2^{[A]}	September 26	New Jersey	3–2	Montreal		Wedgewood	21,288	2–0–0	Recap
3^{[a]}	September 28	New Jersey	0–2	Philadelphia		Kinkaid	—	2–1–0	Recap
4	September 29	New Jersey	1–3	NY Rangers		Wedgewood	17,378	2–2–0	Recap
5	October 1	NY Rangers	4–5	New Jersey		Lindback	11,104	3–2–0	Recap
6	October 3	New Jersey	3–4	NY Islanders		Schneider	5,978	3–3–0	Recap
7	October 5	NY Islanders	3–2	New Jersey		Schneider	7,714	3–4–0	Recap
8^{[b]}	October 8	New Jersey	2–4	Florida		—	—	3–5–0	Recap
Notes:^{A} indicates split-squad.^{a} Game will be played at PPL Center in Allentown, Pennsylvania.^{b} Game will be played at Tate Rink in West Point, New York.

=== Regular season ===
2016–17 Game Log

October: 4–2–2 (Home: 4–0–1; Road: 0–2–1)
#	Date	Visitor	Score	Home	OT	Decision	Attendance	Record	Pts	Recap
1	October 13	New Jersey	1–2	Florida	OT	Schneider	17,128	0–0–1	1	Recap
2	October 15	New Jersey	2–3	Tampa Bay		Schneider	19,092	0–1–1	1	Recap
3	October 18	Anaheim	1–2	New Jersey		Schneider	16,514	1–1–1	3	Recap
4	October 20	New Jersey	1–2	Boston		Schneider	17,565	1–2–1	3	Recap
5	October 22	Minnesota	1–2	New Jersey	OT	Schneider	16,514	2–2–1	5	Recap
6	October 25	Arizona	3–5	New Jersey		Schneider	12,756	3–2–1	7	Recap
7	October 28	Chicago	3–2	New Jersey	OT	Kinkaid	13,882	3–2–2	8	Recap
8	October 29	Tampa Bay	1–3	New Jersey		Schneider	13,098	4–2–2	10	Recap

November: 6–5–3 (Home: 3–0–1; Road: 3–5–2)
#	Date	Visitor	Score	Home	OT	Decision	Attendance	Record	Pts	Recap
9	November 3	New Jersey	3–4	Florida	OT	Schneider	11,597	4–2–3	11	Recap
10	November 5	New Jersey	1–4	Tampa Bay		Schneider	19,092	4–3–3	11	Recap
11	November 6	New Jersey	4–1	Carolina		Kinkaid	8,650	5–3–3	13	Recap
12	November 8	Carolina	2–3	New Jersey	SO	Schneider	12,179	6–3–3	15	Recap
13	November 11	New Jersey	2–1	Buffalo	OT	Kinkaid	18,301	7–3–3	17	Recap
14	November 12	Buffalo	2–4	New Jersey		Schneider	16,514	8–3–3	19	Recap
15	November 15	New Jersey	2–1	Dallas	OT	Schneider	18,039	9–3–3	21	Recap
16	November 17	New Jersey	2–3	Anaheim		Schneider	14,954	9–4–3	21	Recap
17	November 19	New Jersey	2–4	Los Angeles		Schneider	18,230	9–5–3	21	Recap
18	November 21	New Jersey	0–4	San Jose		Schneider	17,286	9–6–3	21	Recap
19	November 23	Toronto	4–5	New Jersey	SO	Schneider	13,752	10–6–3	23	Recap
20	November 25	Detroit	5–4	New Jersey	OT	Schneider	15,612	10–6–4	24	Recap
21	November 26	New Jersey	3–4	Pittsburgh	SO	Kinkaid	18,615	10–6–5	25	Recap
22	November 29	New Jersey	2–3	Winnipeg		Schneider	15,294	10–7–5	25	Recap

December: 4–9–2 (Home: 2–4–0; Road: 2–5–2)
#	Date	Visitor	Score	Home	OT	Decision	Attendance	Record	Pts	Recap
23	December 1	New Jersey	3–4	Chicago	OT	Schneider	21,351	10–7–6	26	Recap
24	December 3	New Jersey	5–4	Nashville	OT	Kinkaid	17,113	11–7–6	28	Recap
25	December 6	Vancouver	2–3	New Jersey		Schneider	13,126	12–7–6	30	Recap
26	December 8	New Jersey	2–5	Montreal		Schneider	21,288	12–8–6	30	Recap
27	December 9	St. Louis	4–1	New Jersey		Kinkaid	16,514	12–9–6	30	Recap
28	December 11	New Jersey	0–5	NY Rangers		Schneider	18,006	12–10–6	30	Recap
29	December 15	New Jersey	2–5	St. Louis		Schneider	18,347	12–11–6	30	Recap
30	December 17	New Jersey	1–3	Ottawa		Kinkaid	15,111	12–12–6	30	Recap
31	December 18	New Jersey	2–3	NY Rangers	SO	Schneider	18,006	12–12–7	31	Recap
32	December 20	Nashville	5–1	New Jersey		Schneider	13,744	12–13–7	31	Recap
33	December 22	Philadelphia	0–4	New Jersey		Schneider	16,514	13–13–7	33	Recap
34	December 23	New Jersey	1–4	Pittsburgh		Schneider	18,625	13–14–7	33	Recap
35	December 27	Pittsburgh	5–2	New Jersey		Schneider	16,514	13–15–7	33	Recap
36	December 29	New Jersey	2–1	Washington	SO	Kinkaid	18,506	14–15–7	35	Recap
37	December 31	Washington	6–2	New Jersey		Kinkaid	16,514	14–16–7	35	Recap

January: 7–5–2 (Home: 1–5–1; Road: 6–0–1)
#	Date	Visitor	Score	Home	OT	Decision	Attendance	Record	Pts	Recap
38	January 2	Boston	0–3	New Jersey		Schneider	15,141	15–16–7	37	Recap
39	January 3	New Jersey	3–1	Carolina		Schneider	8,998	16–16–7	39	Recap
40	January 6	Toronto	4–2	New Jersey		Schneider	15,233	16–17–7	39	Recap
41	January 7	Edmonton	2–1	New Jersey	OT	Schneider	14,734	16–17–8	40	Recap
42	January 9	Florida	3–0	New Jersey		Schneider	12,834	16–18–8	40	Recap
43	January 12	New Jersey	2–3	Edmonton	OT	Schneider	18,347	16–18–9	41	Recap
44	January 13	New Jersey	2–1	Calgary		Kinkaid	19,190	17–18–9	43	Recap
45	January 15	New Jersey	2–1	Vancouver	OT	Schneider	18,865	18–18–9	45	Recap
46	January 17	New Jersey	4–3	Minnesota		Schneider	19,051	19–18–9	47	Recap
47	January 20	Montreal	3–1	New Jersey		Kinkaid	15,345	19–19–9	47	Recap
48	January 21	New Jersey	4–1	Philadelphia		Kinkaid	19,932	20–19–9	49	Recap
49	January 24	Los Angeles	3–1	New Jersey		Schneider	13,412	20–20–9	49	Recap
50	January 26	Washington	5–2	New Jersey		Kinkaid	13,428	20–21–9	49	Recap
January 27–29		All-Star Break in Los Angeles
51	January 31	New Jersey	4–3	Detroit		Schneider	20,027	21–21–9	51	Recap

February: 4–4–3 (Home: 3–3–3; Road: 1–1–0)
#	Date	Visitor	Score	Home	OT	Decision	Attendance	Record	Pts	Recap
52	February 3	Calgary	4–3	New Jersey	OT	Schneider	14,716	21–21–10	52	Recap
53	February 4	New Jersey	5–1	Columbus		Schneider	18,566	22–21–10	54	Recap
54	February 6	Buffalo	1–2	New Jersey		Schneider	12,105	23–21–10	56	Recap
55	February 12	San Jose	4–1	New Jersey		Schneider	16,514	23–22–10	56	Recap
56	February 14	Colorado	2–3	New Jersey		Schneider	12,462	24–22–10	58	Recap
57	February 16	Ottawa	3–0	New Jersey		Schneider	13,908	24–23–10	58	Recap
58	February 18	NY Islanders	2–3	New Jersey		Schneider	16,514	25–23–10	60	Recap
59	February 19	New Jersey	4–6	NY Islanders		Kinkaid	15,795	25–24–10	60	Recap
60	February 21	Ottawa	2–1	New Jersey		Schneider	12,343	25–25–10	60	Recap
61	February 25	NY Rangers	4–3	New Jersey	OT	Schneider	16,514	25–25–11	61	Recap
62	February 27	Montreal	4–3	New Jersey	OT	Schneider	13,270	25–25–12	62	Recap

March: 2–11–2 (Home: 2–3–2; Road: 0–8–0)
#	Date	Visitor	Score	Home	OT	Decision	Attendance	Record	Pts	Recap
63	March 2	New Jersey	0–1	Washington		Schneider	18,506	25–26–12	62	Recap
64	March 4	New Jersey	2–3	Boston		Schneider	17,565	25–27–12	62	Recap
65	March 5	Columbus	3–0	New Jersey		Schneider	14,054	25–28–12	62	Recap
66	March 7	New Jersey	0–2	Columbus		Kinkaid	15,947	25–29–12	62	Recap
67	March 9	New Jersey	2–3	Colorado		Schneider	11,886	25–30–12	62	Recap
68	March 11	New Jersey	4–5	Arizona		Kinkaid	11,223	25–31–12	62	Recap
—	March 14	Winnipeg	—	New Jersey	Postponed due to the effects of the March 2017 nor'easter, rescheduled to March 28
69	March 16	Philadelphia	2–6	New Jersey		Kinkaid	13,718	26–31–12	64	Recap
70	March 17	New Jersey	4–6	Pittsburgh		Kinkaid	18,651	26–32–12	64	Recap
71	March 19	Columbus	4–1	New Jersey		Schneider	14,254	26–33–12	64	Recap
72	March 21	NY Rangers	2–3	New Jersey	OT	Schneider	16,514	27–33–12	66	Recap
73	March 23	New Jersey	2–4	Toronto		Kinkaid	19,142	27–34–12	66	Recap
74	March 25	Carolina	3–1	New Jersey		Schneider	15,088	27–35–12	66	Recap
75	March 26	Dallas	2–1	New Jersey	OT	Kinkaid	14,711	27–35–13	67	Recap
76	March 28	Winnipeg	4–3	New Jersey	SO	Schneider	12,315	27–35–14	68	Recap
77	March 31	New Jersey	1–2	NY Islanders		Kinkaid	13,766	27–36–14	68	Recap

April: 1–4–0 (Home: 1–2–0; Road: 0–2–0)
#	Date	Visitor	Score	Home	OT	Decision	Attendance	Record	Pts	Recap
78	April 1	New Jersey	0–3	Philadelphia		Schneider	19,911	27–37–14	68	Recap
79	April 4	Philadelphia	0–1	New Jersey	OT	Kinkaid	13,861	28–37–14	70	Recap
80	April 6	Pittsburgh	7–4	New Jersey		Schneider	14,012	28–38–14	70	Recap
81	April 8	NY Islanders	4–2	New Jersey		Kinkaid	16,514	28–39–14	70	Recap
82	April 9	New Jersey	1–4	Detroit		Schneider	20,027	28–40–14	70	Recap

Legend: Win (2 points) Loss (0 points) Overtime/shootout loss (1 point)

== Media ==
This was Sherry Ross's final season as a radio color commentator as she was let go at the end of the season. The next season, Chico Resch would return as color commentator on WFAN with Matt Loughlin.

== Player statistics ==
Final Stats

Skaters

Regular season
Player	GP	G	A	Pts	+/−	PIM
Kyle Palmieri	80	26	27	53	2	46
Taylor Hall	72	20	33	53	−9	32
Travis Zajac	80	14	31	45	−8	33
Adam Henrique	82	20	20	40	−20	38
Michael Cammalleri	61	10	21	31	−9	21
Damon Severson	80	3	28	31	−31	58
P. A. Parenteau^{‡}	59	13	14	27	−16	35
Pavel Zacha	70	8	16	24	−17	19
John Moore	63	12	10	22	−7	39
Beau Bennett	65	8	11	19	−3	20
Miles Wood	60	8	9	17	−21	86
Andy Greene	66	4	9	13	−16	8
Kyle Quincey^{‡}	53	4	8	12	4	39
Jacob Josefson	38	1	9	10	−1	16
Devante Smith-Pelly	53	4	5	9	−19	12
Joseph Blandisi	27	3	6	9	−10	26
Stefan Noesen^{†}	32	6	2	8	4	22
Nick Lappin	43	4	3	7	−17	17
Steven Santini	38	2	5	7	−6	14
Ben Lovejoy	82	1	6	7	−7	39
Jon Merrill	51	1	5	6	−9	24
Yohann Auvitu	25	2	2	4	1	2
Sergey Kalinin^{‡}	43	2	2	4	−14	15
John Quenneville	12	1	3	4	1	2
Vernon Fiddler^{‡}	39	1	2	3	−11	29
Karl Stollery	11	0	3	3	−5	13
Dalton Prout	14	0	3	3	−5	30
Blake Coleman	23	1	1	2	−7	27
Reid Boucher^{‡}	9	0	2	2	0	2
Seth Helgeson	9	1	0	1	2	15
Blake Pietila	10	0	1	1	−5	4
Kevin Rooney	4	0	0	0	−3	4
Blake Speers	3	0	0	0	0	0
Michael Kapla	5	0	0	0	−1	0
Ben Thomson	3	0	0	0	−4	4
Luke Gazdic	11	0	0	0	−2	12

Goaltenders

Regular season
Player	GP	GS	TOI	W	L	OT	GA	GAA	SA	SV%	SO	G	A	PIM
Cory Schneider	60	59	3,472:50	20	27	11	163	2.82	1,781	0.908	2	0	0	0
Keith Kinkaid	26	23	1,476:05	8	13	3	65	2.64	778	0.916	1	0	1	0

^{†}Denotes player spent time with another team before joining the Devils. Stats reflect time with the Devils only.
^{‡}Denotes player was traded mid-season. Stats reflect time with the Devils only.
Bold/italics denotes franchise record.

== Awards and honors ==
=== Awards ===
Regular season
Player	Award	Awarded
Michael Cammalleri	NHL Second Star of the Week	November 27, 2016

== Transactions ==
The Devils have been involved in the following transactions during the 2016–17 season.

=== Trades ===
Date	Details		Ref
June 25, 2016	To Pittsburgh Penguins DET's 3rd-round pick in 2016	To New Jersey Devils Beau Bennett
June 29, 2016	To Edmonton Oilers Adam Larsson	To New Jersey Devils Taylor Hall
November 12, 2016	To Philadelphia Flyers Conditional 7th-round pick in 2017	To New Jersey Devils Petr Straka
February 4, 2017	To Nashville Predators Vernon Fiddler	To New Jersey Devils 4th-round pick in 2017
February 18, 2017	To Toronto Maple Leafs Sergei Kalinin	To New Jersey Devils Viktor Loov
March 1, 2017	To Columbus Blue Jackets Kyle Quincey	To New Jersey Devils Dalton Prout
March 1, 2017	To Nashville Predators P. A. Parenteau	To New Jersey Devils 6th-round pick in 2017
March 1, 2017	To Florida Panthers Reece Scarlett	To New Jersey Devils Shane Harper
March 6, 2017	To Ottawa Senators Brandon Gormley	To New Jersey Devils Future considerations
June 17, 2017	To San Jose Sharks BOS's 2nd-round pick (49th overall) in 2017; NSH's 4th-round pick (123rd overall) in 2017	To New Jersey Devils Mirco Mueller; SJS's 5th-round pick (143rd overall) in 2017

=== Free agents acquired ===
Date	Player	Former team	Contract terms (in U.S. dollars)	Ref
July 1, 2016	Ben Lovejoy	Pittsburgh Penguins	3-year, $8 million	
July 1, 2016	Andrew MacWilliam	Manitoba Moose	1-year, $575,000	
July 1, 2016	Carter Camper	Hershey Bears	1-year, $575,000	
July 1, 2016	Vernon Fiddler	Dallas Stars	1-year, $1.25 million	
July 1, 2016	Karl Stollery	San Jose Barracuda	1-year, $575,000	
July 1, 2016	Luke Gazdic	Edmonton Oilers	1-year, $700,000	
July 28, 2016	Brandon Gormley	Colorado Avalanche	1-year, $650,000	
September 28, 2016	Kyle Quincey	Detroit Red Wings	1-year, $1.25 million	
October 3, 2016	Colby Sissons	Swift Current Broncos	3-year, entry-level contract	
February 27, 2017	Kevin Rooney	Albany Devils	1-year, entry-level contract	
March 28, 2017	Michael Kapla	University of Massachusetts Lowell	2-year, entry-level contract	
April 20, 2017	Yaroslav Dyblenko	HC Spartak Moscow	2-year, entry-level contract	

=== Free agents lost ===
Date	Player	New team	Contract terms (in U.S. dollars)	Ref
July 1, 2016	David Schlemko	San Jose Sharks	4-year, $8.4 million	
July 1, 2016	Jim O'Brien	Colorado Avalanche	1-year, $600,000	
July 1, 2016	Mike Sislo	Colorado Avalanche	1-year, $600,000	
July 1, 2016	David Warsofsky	Pittsburgh Penguins	1-year, $575,000	
July 5, 2016	Jordin Tootoo	Chicago Blackhawks	1-year, $750,000	
July 22, 2016	Bobby Farnham	Montreal Canadiens	1-year, $575,000	

=== Claimed via waivers ===
Player	Previous team	Date	Ref
P. A. Parenteau	New York Islanders	October 11, 2016	
Reid Boucher	Nashville Predators	January 2, 2017	
Stefan Noesen	Anaheim Ducks	January 25, 2017	

=== Lost via waivers ===
Player	New team	Date	Ref
Reid Boucher	Nashville Predators	December 3, 2016	
Reid Boucher	Vancouver Canucks	January 4, 2017	

=== Players released ===
Date	Player	Via	Ref

=== Lost via retirement ===
Date	Player	Ref
March 31, 2017	Patrik Elias	

=== Player signings ===
Date	Player	Contract terms (in U.S. dollars)	Ref
July 1, 2016	Devante Smith-Pelly	2-year, $2.6 million	
July 1, 2016	Jon Merrill	2-year, $2.275 million	
July 1, 2016	Beau Bennett	1-year, $725,000	
July 5, 2016	Jacob Josefson	1-year, $1.1 million	
July 6, 2016	Sergey Kalinin	1-year, $800,000	
July 7, 2016	Kyle Palmieri	5-year, $23.25 million	
July 18, 2016	Reece Scarlett	1-year, $600,000	
August 10, 2016	Reid Boucher	1-year, $715,000	
September 21, 2016	Blake Speers	3-year, $2.775 entry-level contract	
September 21, 2016	Colton White	3-year, $2.775 entry-level contract	
October 7, 2016	Michael McLeod	3-year, $4.275 entry-level contract	
October 7, 2016	Nathan Bastian	3-year, $2.775 million entry-level contract	
November 11, 2016	Brandon Gignac	3-year, $2.775 million entry-level contract	
May 9, 2017	Viktor Loov	1-year, 2-way contract, $650,000	
May 12, 2017	Jesper Bratt	3-year, entry-level contract	

== Draft picks ==
Below are the New Jersey Devils' selections at the 2016 NHL entry draft, which was held on June 24–25, 2016 at the First Niagara Center in Buffalo, New York.

Round	#	Player	Pos	Nationality	College/Junior/Club team (League)
1	12^{1}	Michael McLeod	C	Canada	Mississauga Steelheads (OHL)
2	41	Nathan Bastian	RW	Canada	Mississauga Steelheads (OHL)
3	73^{2}	Joey Anderson	RW	United States	U.S. NTDP (USHL)
3	80^{3}	Brandon Gignac	C	Canada	Shawinigan Cataractes (QMJHL)
4	102	Mikhail Maltsev	LW	Russia	Russia U18 (MHL)
4	105^{4}	Evan Cormier	G	Canada	Saginaw Spirit (OHL)
5	132	Yegor Rykov	D	Russia	SKA-1946 (MHL)
6	162	Jesper Bratt	LW/RW	Sweden	AIK IF (Swe-2)
7	192	Jeremy Davies	D	Canada	Bloomington Thunder (USHL)

Notes

1. The Ottawa Senators' first-round pick went to the New Jersey Devils as the result of a trade on June 24, 2016, that sent a first-round pick (11th overall) to Ottawa in exchange for the Islanders' third-round pick in 2016 (80th overall) and this pick.
2. The Ottawa Senators' third-round pick went to the New Jersey Devils as the result of a trade on June 27, 2015, that sent a second-round pick in 2015 to Ottawa in exchange for Dallas' second-round pick in 2015 and this pick (being conditional at the time of the trade). The condition—New Jersey will receive a fourth-round pick in 2015 or a third-round pick in 2016 at their choice—was converted when New Jersey did not take the 109th pick in the 2015 NHL entry draft.
3. The New York Islanders' third-round pick went to the New Jersey Devils as the result of a trade on June 24, 2016, that sent a first-round pick in 2016 (11th overall) to Ottawa in exchange for a first-round pick in 2016 (12th overall) and this pick.
  Ottawa previously acquired this pick as the result of a trade on February 29, 2016, that sent Shane Prince and a seventh-round pick in 2016 to New York in exchange for this pick (being conditional at the time of the trade). The condition—Ottawa will receive the lower of New York or Vancouver's third-round pick in 2016—was converted on March 25, 2016, when the Canucks were eliminated from playoff contention ensuring that they would finish behind the Islanders in the overall league standings.
4. The Boston Bruins' fourth-round pick went to the New Jersey Devils as the result of a trade on February 29, 2016, that sent Lee Stempniak to Boston in exchange for a second-round pick in 2017 and this pick.
