= 2016–17 New York Rangers season =

National Hockey League season

2016–17 New York Rangers
- Division: 4th Metropolitan
- Conference: 5th Eastern
- 2016–17 record: 48–28–6
- Home record: 21–16–4
- Road record: 27–12–2
- Goals for: 256
- Goals against: 220

Team information
- General manager: Jeff Gorton
- Coach: Alain Vigneault
- Captain: Ryan McDonagh
- Alternate captains: Dan Girardi; Rick Nash; Marc Staal; Derek Stepan
- Arena: Madison Square Garden
- Average attendance: 18,006
- Minor league affiliates: Hartford Wolf Pack (AHL); Greenville Swamp Rabbits (ECHL)

Team leaders
- Goals: Chris Kreider (28)
- Assists: Mats Zuccarello (44)
- Points: Mats Zuccarello (59)
- Penalty minutes: Chris Kreider (58)
- Plus/minus: Michael Grabner (+22)
- Wins: Henrik Lundqvist (31)
- Goals against average: Magnus Hellberg (1.52)

The Rangers' 90th anniversary logo

The 2016–17 New York Rangers season was the franchise's 90th season of play and their 91st season overall. The team began its regular games on October 13, 2016, against the New York Islanders.

== Standings ==
Metropolitan Division
Pos	Team	GP	W	L	OTL	ROW	GF	GA	GD	Pts
1	p – Washington Capitals	82	55	19	8	53	263	182	+81	118
2	x – Pittsburgh Penguins	82	50	21	11	46	282	234	+48	111
3	x – Columbus Blue Jackets	82	50	24	8	47	249	195	+54	108
4	x – New York Rangers	82	48	28	6	45	256	220	+36	102
5	New York Islanders	82	41	29	12	39	241	242	−1	94
6	Philadelphia Flyers	82	39	33	10	32	219	236	−17	88
7	Carolina Hurricanes	82	36	31	15	33	215	236	−21	87
8	New Jersey Devils	82	28	40	14	25	183	244	−61	70

Source: National Hockey League
p – Clinched Presidents' Trophy; x – Clinched playoff spot

Eastern Conference Wild Card
Pos	Div	Team	GP	W	L	OTL	ROW	GF	GA	GD	Pts
1	ME	x – New York Rangers	82	48	28	6	45	256	220	+36	102
2	AT	x – Toronto Maple Leafs	82	40	27	15	39	251	242	+9	95
3	ME	New York Islanders	82	41	29	12	39	241	242	−1	94
4	AT	Tampa Bay Lightning	82	42	30	10	38	234	227	+7	94
5	ME	Philadelphia Flyers	82	39	33	10	32	219	236	−17	88
6	ME	Carolina Hurricanes	82	36	31	15	33	215	236	−21	87
7	AT	Florida Panthers	82	35	36	11	30	210	237	−27	81
8	AT	Detroit Red Wings	82	33	36	13	24	207	244	−37	79
9	AT	Buffalo Sabres	82	33	37	12	31	201	237	−36	78
10	ME	New Jersey Devils	82	28	40	14	25	183	244	−61	70

Source: National Hockey League
x – Clinched playoff spot

== Schedule and results ==
=== Pre-season ===
2016 Pre-season: 2–2–2 (home: 2–1–0; road: 0–1–2)

Game	Date	Opponent	Score	Record
1	September 27	New York Islanders	5–2	1–0–0
2	September 29	New Jersey Devils	3–1	2–0–0
3	October 1	@ New Jersey Devils	4–5	2–1–0
4	October 3	@ Philadelphia Flyers	3–4 (OT)	2–1–1
5	October 4	@ New York Islanders	2–3 (OT)	2–1–2
6	October 6	Philadelphia Flyers	4–2	2–2–2

=== Regular season ===
2016–17 Game Log
October: 6–3–0, 12 Points (home: 5–1–0; road: 1–2–0)

Game	Date	Opponent	Score	OT	Decision	Location	Attendance	Record	Points	Recap
1	October 13	NY Islanders	5–3		Lundqvist	Madison Square Garden	18,200	1–0–0	2	Recap
2	October 15	@ St. Louis	2–3		Lundqvist	Scottrade Center	19,197	1–1–0	2	Recap
3	October 17	San Jose	7–4		Raanta	Madison Square Garden	18,200	2–1–0	4	Recap
4	October 19	Detroit	1–2		Lundqvist	Madison Square Garden	18,200	2–2–0	4	Recap
5	October 22	@ Washington	4–2		Lundqvist	Verizon Center	18,506	3–2–0	6	Recap
6	October 23	Arizona	3–2		Lundqvist	Madison Square Garden	18,006	4–2–0	8	Recap
7	October 26	Boston	5–2		Lundqvist	Madison Square Garden	18,006	5–2–0	10	Recap
8	October 28	@ Carolina	2–3		Lundqvist	PNC Arena	18,380	5–3–0	10	Recap
9	October 30	Tampa Bay	6–1		Raanta	Madison Square Garden	18,006	6–3–0	12	Recap

November: 10–4–1, 21 Points (home: 4–3–1; road: 6–1–0)

Game	Date	Opponent	Score	OT	Decision	Location	Attendance	Record	Points	Recap
10	November 1	St. Louis	5–0		Lundqvist	Madison Square Garden	18,006	7–3–0	14	Recap
11	November 3	Edmonton	5–3		Lundqvist	Madison Square Garden	18,006	8–3–0	16	Recap
12	November 5	@ Boston	5–2		Raanta	TD Garden	17,565	9–3–0	18	Recap
13	November 6	Winnipeg	5–2		Lundqvist	Madison Square Garden	18,006	10–3–0	20	Recap
14	November 8	Vancouver	3–5		Raanta	Madison Square Garden	18,006	10–4–0	20	Recap
15	November 12	@ Calgary	4–1		Lundqvist	Scotiabank Saddledome	19,289	11–4–0	22	Recap
16	November 13	@ Edmonton	3–1		Raanta	Rogers Place	18,347	12–4–0	24	Recap
17	November 15	@ Vancouver	7–2		Lundqvist	Rogers Arena	17,814	13–4–0	26	Recap
18	November 18	@ Columbus	2–4		Lundqvist	Nationwide Arena	14,541	13–5–0	26	Recap
19	November 20	Florida	2–3	SO	Lundqvist	Madison Square Garden	18,006	13–5–1	27	Recap
20	November 21	@ Pittsburgh	5–2		Raanta	Consol Energy Center	18,632	14–5–1	29	Recap
21	November 23	Pittsburgh	1–6		Lundqvist	Madison Square Garden	18,006	14–6–1	29	Recap
22	November 25	@ Philadelphia	3–2		Lundqvist	Wells Fargo Center	19,981	15–6–1	31	Recap
23	November 27	Ottawa	0–2		Raanta	Madison Square Garden	18,006	15–7–1	31	Recap
24	November 29	Carolina	3–2		Lundqvist	Madison Square Garden	18,006	16–7–1	33	Recap

December: 10–5–0, 20 Points (home: 4–2–0; road: 6–3–0)

Game	Date	Opponent	Score	OT	Decision	Location	Attendance	Record	Points	Recap
25	December 1	@ Buffalo	3–4		Lundqvist	First Niagara Center	18,047	16–8–1	33	Recap
26	December 3	Carolina	4–2		Lundqvist	Madison Square Garden	18,006	17–8–1	35	Recap
27	December 6	@ NY Islanders	2–4		Lundqvist	Barclays Center	15,795	17–9–1	35	Recap
28	December 8	@ Winnipeg	2–1		Raanta	MTS Centre	15,294	18–9–1	37	Recap
29	December 9	@ Chicago	1–0	OT	Raanta	United Center	21,770	19–9–1	39	Recap
30	December 11	New Jersey	5–0		Raanta	Madison Square Garden	18,006	20–9–1	41	Recap
31	December 13	Chicago	1–2		Raanta	Madison Square Garden	18,006	20–10–1	41	Recap
32	December 15	@ Dallas	2–0		Lundqvist	American Airlines Center	18,212	21–10–1	43	Recap
33	December 17	@ Nashville	2–1	SO	Lundqvist	Bridgestone Arena	17,113	22–10–1	45	Recap
34	December 18	New Jersey	3–2	SO	Lundqvist	Madison Square Garden	18,006	23–10–1	47	Recap
35	December 20	@ Pittsburgh	2–7		Raanta	Consol Energy Center	18,541	23–11–1	47	Recap
36	December 23	Minnesota	4–7		Raanta	Madison Square Garden	18,006	23–12–1	47	Recap
37	December 27	Ottawa	4–3		Raanta	Madison Square Garden	18,006	24–12–1	49	Recap
38	December 29	@ Arizona	6–3		Raanta	Gila River Arena	15,090	25–12–1	51	Recap
39	December 31	@ Colorado	6–2		Lundqvist	Pepsi Center	17,609	26–12–1	53	Recap

January: 5–6–0, 10 Points (home: 1–5–0; road: 4–1–0)

Game	Date	Opponent	Score	OT	Decision	Location	Attendance	Record	Points	Recap
40	January 3	Buffalo	1–4		Lundqvist	Madison Square Garden	18,006	26–13–1	53	Recap
41	January 4	@ Philadelphia	5–2		Lundqvist	Wells Fargo Center	19,858	27–13–1	55	Recap
42	January 7	@ Columbus	5–4		Lundqvist	Nationwide Arena	19,001	28–13–1	57	Recap
43	January 13	Toronto	2–4		Lundqvist	Madison Square Garden	18,006	28–14–1	57	Recap
44	January 14	@ Montreal	4–5		Lundqvist	Bell Centre	21,288	28–15–1	57	Recap
45	January 17	Dallas	6–7		Lundqvist	Madison Square Garden	18,006	28–16–1	57	Recap
46	January 19	@ Toronto	5–2		Lundqvist	Air Canada Centre	19,088	29–16–1	59	Recap
47	January 22	@ Detroit	1–0	OT	Lundqvist	Joe Louis Arena	20,027	30–16–1	61	Recap
48	January 23	Los Angeles	3–2		Lundqvist	Madison Square Garden	18,006	31–16–1	63	Recap
49	January 25	Philadelphia	0–2		Lundqvist	Madison Square Garden	18,006	31–17–1	63	Recap
January 27–29		All-Star Break in Los Angeles								
50	January 31	Columbus	4–6		Raanta	Madison Square Garden	18,006	31–18–1	63	Recap

February: 9–3–1, 19 Points (home: 5–2–1; road: 4–1–0)

Game	Date	Opponent	Score	OT	Decision	Location	Attendance	Record	Points	Recap
51	February 2	@ Buffalo	2–1	OT	Lundqvist	First Niagara Center	18,941	32–18–1	65	Recap
52	February 5	Calgary	4–3		Lundqvist	Madison Square Garden	18,006	33–18–1	67	Recap
53	February 7	Anaheim	4–1		Lundqvist	Madison Square Garden	18,006	34–18–1	69	Recap
54	February 9	Nashville	4–3		Lundqvist	Madison Square Garden	18,006	35–18–1	71	Recap
55	February 11	Colorado	4–2		Lundqvist	Madison Square Garden	18,006	36–18–1	73	Recap
56	February 13	@ Columbus	3–2		Raanta	Nationwide Arena	14,378	37–18–1	75	Recap
57	February 16	@ NY Islanders	2–4		Lundqvist	Barclays Center	15,795	37–18–1	75	Recap
58	February 19	Washington	2–1		Lundqvist	Madison Square Garden	18,006	38–19–1	77	Recap
59	February 21	Montreal	2–3	SO	Lundqvist	Madison Square Garden	18,006	38–19–2	78	Recap
60	February 23	@ Toronto	2–1	SO	Lundqvist	Air Canada Centre	19,175	39–19–2	80	Recap
61	February 25	@ New Jersey	4–3	OT	Raanta	Prudential Center	16,514	40–19–2	82	Recap
62	February 26	Columbus	2–5		Lundqvist	Madison Square Garden	18,006	40–20–2	82	Recap
63	February 28	Washington	1–4		Lundqvist	Madison Square Garden	18,006	40–21–2	82	Recap

March: 6–5–4, 16 Points (home: 0–3–2; road: 6–2–2)

Game	Date	Opponent	Score	OT	Decision	Location	Attendance	Record	Points	Recap
64	March 2	@ Boston	2–1		Lundqvist	TD Garden	17,565	41–21–2	84	Recap
65	March 4	Montreal	1–4		Lundqvist	Madison Square Garden	18,006	41–22–2	84	Recap
66	March 6	@ Tampa Bay	1–0	OT	Raanta	Amalie Arena	19,092	42–22–2	86	Recap
67	March 7	@ Florida	5–2		Lundqvist	BB&T Center	16,116	43–22–2	88	Recap
68	March 9	@ Carolina	3–4		Raanta	PNC Arena	11,404	43–23–2	88	Recap
69	March 12	@ Detroit	4–1		Raanta	Joe Louis Arena	20,027	44–23–2	90	Recap
70	March 13	Tampa Bay	2–3		Raanta	Madison Square Garden	18,006	44–24–2	90	Recap
71	March 17	Florida	3–4	SO	Raanta	Madison Square Garden	18,006	44–24–3	91	Recap
72	March 18	@ Minnesota	3–2		Raanta	Xcel Energy Center	19,337	45–24–3	93	Recap
73	March 21	@ New Jersey	2–3	OT	Raanta	Prudential Center	16,514	45–24–4	94	Recap
74	March 22	NY Islanders	2–3		Raanta	Madison Square Garden	18,006	45–25–4	94	Recap
75	March 25	@ Los Angeles	3–0		Raanta	Staples Center	18,230	46–25–4	96	Recap
76	March 26	@ Anaheim	3–6		Lundqvist	Honda Center	17,174	46–26–4	96	Recap
77	March 28	@ San Jose	4–5	OT	Lundqvist	SAP Center	17,562	46–26–5	97	Recap
78	March 31	Pittsburgh	3–4	SO	Lundqvist	Madison Square Garden	18,006	46–26–6	98	Recap

April: 2–2–0, 4 Points (home: 2–0–0; road: 0–2–0)

Game	Date	Opponent	Score	OT	Decision	Location	Attendance	Record	Points	Recap
79	April 2	Philadelphia	4–3		Lundqvist	Madison Square Garden	18,006	47–26–6	100	Recap
80	April 5	@ Washington	0–2		Lundqvist	Verizon Center	18,506	47–27–6	100	Recap
81	April 8	@ Ottawa	1–3		Lundqvist	Canadian Tire Centre	18,976	47–28–6	100	Recap
82	April 9	Pittsburgh	3–2		Hellberg	Madison Square Garden	18,006	48–28–6	102	Recap

Win (2 Points) Loss (0 points) Overtime/shootout loss (1 point)

== Playoffs ==
The Rangers qualified for the playoffs for the seventh consecutive season, entering as the Wild Card in the Eastern Conference and being matched up against the Montreal Canadiens in the first round. The Rangers defeated the Canadiens in six games, moving on to round 2 against the Ottawa Senators. The Rangers were then eliminated by the Senators in six games.

2017 Stanley Cup playoffs
Eastern Conference First Round vs. (A1) Montreal Canadiens: Rangers won series 4–2 (home: 2–1; Away: 2–1)

Game	Date	Opponent	Score	Decision	Series
1	April 12	@ Montreal	2–0	Lundqvist	Rangers lead 1–0
2	April 14	@ Montreal	3–4 OT	Lundqvist	Series tied 1–1
3	April 16	Montreal	1–3	Lundqvist	Canadiens lead 2–1
4	April 18	Montreal	2–1	Lundqvist	Series tied 2–2
5	April 20	@ Montreal	3–2 OT	Lundqvist	Rangers lead 3–2
6	April 22	Montreal	3–1	Lundqvist	Rangers win series 4–2

Eastern Conference Second Round vs. (A2) Ottawa Senators: Senators won series 4–2 (home: 2–1; Away: 0–3)

Game	Date	Opponent	Score	Decision	Series
1	April 27	@ Ottawa	1–2	Lundqvist	Senators lead 1–0
2	April 29	@ Ottawa	5–6 2OT	Lundqvist	Senators lead 2–0
3	May 2	Ottawa	4–1	Lundqvist	Senators lead 2–1
4	May 4	Ottawa	4–1	Lundqvist	Series tied 2–2
5	May 6	@ Ottawa	4–5 OT	Lundqvist	Senators lead 3–2
6	May 9	Ottawa	2–4	Lundqvist	Senators win series 4–2

Win Loss

== Player statistics ==
Final stats

Skaters

Regular season
Player	GP	G	A	Pts	+/−	PIM
Mats Zuccarello	80	15	44	59	15	26
J. T. Miller	82	22	34	56	17	21
Derek Stepan	81	17	38	55	19	16
Chris Kreider	75	28	25	53	6	58
Kevin Hayes	76	17	32	49	10	18
Ryan McDonagh	77	6	36	42	20	37
Michael Grabner	76	27	13	40	22	10
Brady Skjei	80	5	34	39	11	42
Rick Nash	67	23	15	38	9	26
Mika Zibanejad	56	14	23	37	9	16
Nick Holden	80	11	23	34	13	35
Jimmy Vesey	80	16	11	27	−13	26
Jesper Fast	68	6	15	21	6	16
Oscar Lindberg	65	8	12	20	2	32
Pavel Buchnevich	41	8	12	20	6	13
Brandon Pirri	60	8	10	18	−8	25
Dan Girardi	63	4	11	15	8	16
Kevin Klein	60	3	11	14	5	31
Adam Clendening	31	2	9	11	3	17
Marc Staal	72	3	7	10	9	34
Matt Puempel^{†}	27	6	3	9	−6	4
Brendan Smith^{†}	18	1	3	4	2	29
Tanner Glass	11	1	1	2	0	17
Steven Kampfer^{†}	10	1	1	2	−1	2
Josh Jooris^{‡}	12	1	1	2	1	6
Marek Hrivik	16	0	2	2	−3	2
Taylor Beck^{†}	2	0	0	0	−2	0
Nicklas Jensen	7	0	0	0	−2	0
Cristoval Nieves	1	0	0	0	−1	0
Dylan McIlrath^{‡}	1	0	0	0	0	4

Playoffs
Player	GP	G	A	Pts	+/−	PIM
Mika Zibanejad	12	2	7	9	4	0
Mats Zuccarello	12	4	3	7	0	16
Ryan McDonagh	12	2	5	7	0	12
Michael Grabner	12	4	2	6	4	0
Jesper Fast	12	3	3	6	4	0
Derek Stepan	12	2	4	6	−3	4
Brady Skjei	12	4	1	5	6	10
Rick Nash	12	3	2	5	1	4
Jimmy Vesey	12	1	4	5	0	9
Chris Kreider	12	3	1	4	1	18
Oscar Lindberg	12	3	1	4	3	2
Nick Holden	11	2	2	4	−3	4
Tanner Glass	7	1	3	4	−1	7
Brendan Smith	12	0	4	4	8	20
Kevin Hayes	12	0	3	3	0	4
J. T. Miller	12	0	3	3	1	21
Dan Girardi	12	0	2	2	−1	2
Pavel Buchnevich	5	0	1	1	1	0
Kevin Klein	1	0	1	1	0	0
Marc Staal	12	0	0	0	−1	2

Goaltenders

Regular season
Player	GP	GS	TOI	W	L	OT	GA	GAA	SA	SV%	SO	G	A	PIM
Henrik Lundqvist	57	55	3241	31	20	4	148	2.74	1650	.910	2	0	1	0
Antti Raanta	30	26	1618	16	8	2	61	2.26	782	.922	4	0	1	0
Magnus Hellberg	2	1	79	1	0	0	2	1.52	28	.929	0	0	0	0

Playoffs
Player	GP	GS	TOI	W	L	GA	GAA	SA	SV%	SO	G	A	PIM
Henrik Lundqvist	12	12	775	6	6	29	2.25	395	.927	1	0	0	0

^{†}Denotes player spent time with another team before joining the Rangers. Stats reflect time with the Rangers only.
^{‡}Denotes player was traded mid-season. Stats reflect time with the Rangers only.
Bold/italics denotes franchise record.

== Awards and honors ==
=== Awards ===
Regular season
Player	Award	Date
Antti Raanta	NHL Second Star of the Week	December 12, 2016
Kevin Hayes	NHL Third Star of the Week	November 6, 2016
Henrik Lundqvist	NHL Second Star of the Week	December 19, 2016
Chris Kreider	NHL Second Star of the Week	January 2, 2017
Michael Grabner	NHL First Star of the Week	January 7, 2017
Ryan McDonagh	Team Most Valuable Player	April 9, 2017
Jesper Fast	Players Player Award	April 9, 2017
Mats Zuccarello	Steven McDonald Extra Effort Award	April 9, 2017

=== Milestones ===
Regular season
Player	Milestone	Reached
Henrik Lundqvist	375th career NHL win	October 13, 2016
Brady Skjei	1st career NHL point	October 13, 2016
Jimmy Vesey	1st career NHL point 1st career NHL goal	October 17, 2016
Ryan McDonagh	400th career NHL game	November 1, 2016
Henrik Lundqvist	60th career shutout	November 1, 2016
Jimmy Vesey	1st career NHL assist 1st career three-point NHL game	November 1, 2016
Pavel Buchnevich	1st career NHL goal	November 5, 2016
Rick Nash	400th career NHL goal	November 8, 2016
Cristoval Nieves	1st career NHL game	November 14, 2016
Henrik Lundqvist	700th career NHL game	November 20, 2016
Brady Skjei	1st career NHL goal	December 11, 2016
Kevin Klein	600th career NHL game	December 27, 2016
Matt Puempel	1st career NHL hat trick	December 29, 2016
Alain Vigneault	1,100 career NHL game	January 23, 2017
Alain Vigneault	600th career NHL win	February 7, 2017
Henrik Lundqvist	400th career NHL win	February 11, 2017
Magnus Hellberg	1st career NHL start 1st career NHL win	April 9, 2017

=== Records ===
Regular season
Player	Record	Reached
Henrik Lundqvist	375th career NHL win (14th all-time)	October 13, 2016
Henrik Lundqvist	389th career NHL win (13th all-time)	December 18, 2016
Henrik Lundqvist	390th career NHL win (12th all-time)	December 31, 2016
Henrik Lundqvist	400th career NHL win (12th all-time)	February 11, 2017
Henrik Lundqvist	401st career NHL win (11th all-time)	February 19, 2017
Henrik Lundqvist	403rd career NHL win (Tied 10th all-time)	March 2, 2017
Henrik Lundqvist	404th career NHL win (10th all-time)	March 7, 2017

== Transactions ==
The Rangers have been involved in the following transactions during the 2016–17 season:

=== Trades ===
Date	Details		Ref
June 25, 2016	To Colorado Avalanche: 4th-round pick in 2017	To New York Rangers: Nick Holden
July 18, 2016	To Ottawa Senators: Derick Brassard; 7th-round pick in 2018	To New York Rangers: Mika Zibanejad; 2nd-round pick in 2018
November 8, 2016	To Florida Panthers: Dylan McIlrath	To New York Rangers: Steven Kampfer; Conditional 7th-round pick in 2018
February 28, 2017	To Detroit Red Wings: 3rd-round pick in 2017; OTT's 2nd-round pick in 2018	To New York Rangers: Brendan Smith
February 28, 2017	To Buffalo Sabres: Mat Bodie	To New York Rangers: Daniel Catenacci
March 1, 2017	To Edmonton Oilers: Justin Fontaine	To New York Rangers: Taylor Beck

=== Free agents acquired ===
Date	Player	Former team	Contract terms (in U.S. dollars)	Ref
July 1, 2016	Michael Grabner	Toronto Maple Leafs	2-year, $3.3 million	
July 1, 2016	Nathan Gerbe	Carolina Hurricanes	1-year, $600,000	
July 1, 2016	Adam Clendening	Edmonton Oilers	1-year, $600,000	
July 1, 2016	Michael Paliotta	Lake Erie Monsters	1-year, $600,000	
July 15, 2016	Josh Jooris	Calgary Flames	1-year, $600,000	
August 18, 2016	John Gilmour	Providence College	2-year, $1.85 million entry-level contract	
August 19, 2016	Jimmy Vesey	Harvard University	2-year, $7.55 million entry-level contract	
August 26, 2016	Brandon Pirri	Anaheim Ducks	1-year, $1.1 million	
October 16, 2016	Justin Fontaine	Minnesota Wild	1-year, $600,000	
March 23, 2017	Chris Nell	Bowling Green State University	entry-level contract	
March 27, 2017	Vinni Lettieri	University of Minnesota	entry-level contract	
March 28, 2017	Vince Pedrie	Penn State	entry-level contract	
April 21, 2017	Alexei Bereglazov	Metallurg Magnitogorsk	2-year, $3.55 million	
May 1, 2017	Neal Pionk	University of Minnesota Duluth	entry-level contract	
May 8, 2017	Dawson Leedahl	Regina Pats	entry-level contract	

=== Free agents lost ===
Date	Player	New team	Contract terms (in U.S. dollars)	Ref
July 1, 2016	Jayson Megna	Vancouver Canucks	1-year, $600,000	
July 1, 2016	Eric Staal	Minnesota Wild	3-year, $10.5 million	
July 1, 2016	Viktor Stalberg	Carolina Hurricanes	1-year, $1.5 million	
August 30, 2016	Dominic Moore	Boston Bruins	1-year, $900,000	

=== Claimed via waivers ===
Player	Previous team	Date	Ref
Matt Puempel	Ottawa Senators	November 21, 2016	

=== Lost via waivers ===
Player	New team	Date	Ref
Josh Jooris	Arizona Coyotes	December 11, 2016	

=== Lost via retirement ===
Player	Ref
Dan Boyle	

=== Player signings ===
Date	Player	Contract terms (in U.S. dollars)	Ref
July 5, 2016	Mat Bodie	1-year, $600,000	
July 5, 2016	Nicklas Jensen	1-year, $600,000	
July 13, 2016	J. T. Miller	2-year, $5.25 million	
July 15, 2016	Dylan McIlrath	1-year, $800,000	
July 15, 2016	Tommy Hughes	1-year, $632,500	
July 18, 2016	Robin Kovacs	3-year, $2.775 million entry-level contract	
July 22, 2016	Chris Kreider	4-year, $18.5 million	
July 22, 2016	Kevin Hayes	2-year, $5.2 million	
July 26, 2016	Sergey Zborovskiy	3-year, $2.775 million entry-level contract	
July 28, 2016	Marek Hrivik	1-year, $600,000	
March 8, 2017	Sean Day	3-year, $2.775 million entry-level contract	
March 16, 2017	Tim Gettinger	3-year, $2.21 million entry-level contract	
April 10, 2017	Gabriel Fontaine	3-year, $2.21 million entry-level contract	
April 12, 2017	Steven Kampfer	2-year, $1.3 million contract extension	
June 14, 2017	Matt Puempel	1-year, $725,000 contract extension	

== Draft picks ==
Below are the New York Rangers' selections at the 2016 NHL entry draft, to be held on June 24–25, 2016 at the First Niagara Center in Buffalo, New York.

Round	#	Player	Pos	Nationality	College/Junior/Club team (League)
3	81	Sean Day	D	Canada	Mississauga Steelheads (OHL)
4	98^{[a]}	Tarmo Reunanen	D	Finland	TPS Jr.
5	141	Timothy Gettinger	LW	United States	Sault Ste. Marie Greyhounds (OHL)
6	171	Gabriel Fontaine	C	Canada	Rouyn-Noranda Huskies (QMJHL)
6	174^{[b]}	Tyler Wall	G	Canada	Leamington Flyers (GOJHL)
7	201	Ty Ronning	RW	Canada	Vancouver Giants (WHL)

Draft notes

- The New York Rangers' first-round pick went to the Detroit Red Wings as the result of a trade on June 24, 2016, that sent Pavel Datsyuk and a first-round pick in 2016 (16th overall) to Arizona in exchange for Joe Vitale, a compensatory second-round pick in 2016 (53rd overall) and this pick. Arizona previously acquired this pick as the result of a trade on March 1, 2015, that sent Keith Yandle, Chris Summers and a fourth-round pick in 2016 to New York in exchange for John Moore, Anthony Duclair, Tampa Bay's second-round pick in 2015 and this pick (being conditional at the time of the trade). The condition – Arizona will receive a first-round pick in 2016 if New York qualifies for the 2016 Stanley Cup playoffs – was converted on April 4, 2016.
- The New York Rangers' second-round pick went to the Chicago Blackhawks as the result of a trade on June 15, 2016, that sent Teuvo Teravainen and Bryan Bickell to Carolina in exchange for Chicago's third-round pick in 2017 and this pick.
- ^{[a]} The Arizona Coyotes' fourth-round pick went to the New York Rangers as the result of a trade on March 1, 2015, that sent John Moore, Anthony Duclair, Tampa Bay's second-round pick in 2015 and a conditional first-round pick in 2016 to Arizona in exchange for Keith Yandle, Chris Summers and this pick.
- The New York Rangers' fourth-round pick went to the San Jose Sharks as the result of a trade on March 1, 2015, that sent James Sheppard to New York in exchange for this pick.
- ^{[b]} The Florida Panthers' sixth-round pick went to the New York Rangers as the result of a trade on June 20, 2016, that sent Keith Yandle to Florida in exchange for a conditional fourth-round pick in 2017 and this pick.
