= 2016–17 Vancouver Canucks season =

NHL hockey team season

2016–17 Vancouver Canucks
- Division: 7th Pacific
- Conference: 13th Western
- 2016–17 record: 30–43–9
- Home record: 18–17–6
- Road record: 12–26–3
- Goals for: 182
- Goals against: 243

Team information
- General manager: Jim Benning
- Coach: Willie Desjardins
- Captain: Henrik Sedin
- Alternate captains: Alex Burrows (Oct.–Feb.); Alexander Edler (Feb.–Apr.); Bo Horvat (Feb.–Apr.); Daniel Sedin; Brandon Sutter (Feb.–Apr.); Christopher Tanev (Feb.–Apr.)
- Arena: Rogers Arena
- Average attendance: 18,509 (97.9%)
- Minor league affiliates: Utica Comets (AHL); Alaska Aces (ECHL)

Team leaders
- Goals: Bo Horvat (20)
- Assists: Henrik Sedin (36)
- Points: Bo Horvat (52)
- Penalty minutes: Nikita Tryamkin (64)
- Plus/minus: Christopher Tanev (+3)
- Wins: Ryan Miller (18)
- Goals against average: Jacob Markstrom (2.63)

The 2016–17 Vancouver Canucks season was the 47th season for the National Hockey League (NHL) franchise that was established on May 22, 1970. For the third consecutive season, they opened the season with a match against the Calgary Flames. The team finished with the lowest-scoring season in franchise history, scoring just 182 goals. The day after the Canucks' season-ending game, head coach Willie Desjardins was fired, along with assistant coaches Doug Lidster and Perry Pearn. The Canucks overall missed the playoffs for the second consecutive year.

== Off-season ==
The Canucks made their first off-season move while the 2016 Stanley Cup playoffs were still in action, sending centre Jared McCann and second and fourth round picks to the Florida Panthers in exchange for defenceman Erik Gudbranson and a fifth-round pick. On June 27, two days after the 2016 NHL entry draft, the Canucks placed winger Chris Higgins on unconditional waivers and subsequently bought out the final year of his contract.

=== Training camp ===
Vancouver's 2016 training camp was held in Whistler, British Columbia, on September 22–26, 2016.

== Regular season ==
During the team bye week in February, many Canucks players experienced mumps symptoms, with some being diagnosed with the disease. Compounded with ongoing injuries to other players at the time, the Canucks played their following game with 11 regulars out of the lineup, where they lost to the San Jose Sharks 4–1.

Preceding the 2017 NHL trade deadline, the Canucks traded long-time forward Alex Burrows to the Ottawa Senators in exchange for prospect Jonathan Dahlen on February 27, 2017. The following night, they traded another long-time forward, Jannik Hansen, to the San Jose Sharks in exchange for Nikolay Goldobin and a conditional fourth-round pick at the 2017 NHL entry draft.

The Canucks finished their season with 69 points and had the second-best odds for the draft lottery of the 2017 NHL Entry Draft.

== Standings ==
Pacific Division
Pos	Team	GP	W	L	OTL	ROW	GF	GA	GD	Pts
1	y – Anaheim Ducks	82	46	23	13	43	223	200	+23	105
2	x – Edmonton Oilers	82	47	26	9	43	247	212	+35	103
3	x – San Jose Sharks	82	46	29	7	44	221	201	+20	99
4	x – Calgary Flames	82	45	33	4	41	226	221	+5	94
5	Los Angeles Kings	82	39	35	8	37	201	205	−4	86
6	Arizona Coyotes	82	30	42	10	24	197	260	−63	70
7	Vancouver Canucks	82	30	43	9	26	182	243	−61	69

Source: National Hockey League
x – Clinched playoff spot; y – Clinched division

Western Conference Wild Card
Pos	Div	Team	GP	W	L	OTL	ROW	GF	GA	GD	Pts
1	PA	x – Calgary Flames	82	45	33	4	41	226	221	+5	94
2	CE	x – Nashville Predators	82	41	29	12	39	240	224	+16	94
3	CE	Winnipeg Jets	82	40	35	7	37	249	256	−7	87
4	PA	Los Angeles Kings	82	39	35	8	37	201	205	−4	86
5	CE	Dallas Stars	82	34	37	11	33	223	262	−39	79
6	PA	Arizona Coyotes	82	30	42	10	24	197	260	−63	70
7	PA	Vancouver Canucks	82	30	43	9	26	182	243	−61	69
8	CE	Colorado Avalanche	82	22	56	4	21	166	278	−112	48

Source: National Hockey League
x – Clinched playoff spot

== Schedule and results ==
=== Pre-season ===
Pre-season game log: 3–2–2 (Home: 2–1–1; Road: 1–1–1)
#	Date	Visitor	Score	Home	OT	Decision	Attendance	Record	Recap
1	September 27	Vancouver	2–3	San Jose	OT	Garteig	14,865	0–0–1	Recap
2	September 28	Edmonton	3–5	Vancouver		Demko	17,058	1–0–1	Recap
3	September 30	Vancouver	1–2	Calgary		Bachman	19,102	1–1–1	Recap
4	October 2	San Jose	3–2	Vancouver	OT	Miller	17,301	1–1–2	Recap
5	October 3	Arizona	4–2	Vancouver		Markstrom	16,869	1–2–2	Recap
6	October 6	Calgary	0–4	Vancouver		Miller	17,960	2–2–2	Recap
7	October 8	Vancouver	3–2	Edmonton		Markstrom	18,500	3–2–2	Recap

=== Regular season ===
2016–17 game log

October: 4–4–1 (Home: 4–3–0; Road: 0–1–1)
#	Date	Visitor	Score	Home	OT	Decision	Attendance	Record	Pts	Recap
1	October 15	Calgary	1–2	Vancouver	SO	Miller	18,865	1–0–0	2	Recap
2	October 16	Carolina	3–4	Vancouver	OT	Markstrom	17,832	2–0–0	4	Recap
3	October 18	St. Louis	1–2	Vancouver	OT	Markstrom	17,568	3–0–0	6	Recap
4	October 20	Buffalo	1–2	Vancouver		Markstrom	17,809	4–0–0	8	Recap
5	October 22	Vancouver	3–4	Los Angeles	SO	Markstrom	18,230	4–0–1	9	Recap
6	October 23	Vancouver	2–4	Anaheim		Miller	17,174	4–1–1	9	Recap
7	October 25	Ottawa	3–0	Vancouver		Miller	18,471	4–2–1	9	Recap
8	October 28	Edmonton	2–0	Vancouver		Miller	18,865	4–3–1	9	Recap
9	October 29	Washington	5–2	Vancouver		Markstrom	18,338	4–4–1	9	Recap

November: 6–7–1 (Home: 3–1–1; Road: 3–6–0)
#	Date	Visitor	Score	Home	OT	Decision	Attendance	Record	Pts	Recap
10	November 2	Vancouver	0–3	Montreal		Miller	21,288	4–5–1	9	Recap
11	November 3	Vancouver	0–1	Ottawa		Markstrom	13,260	4–6–1	9	Recap
12	November 5	Vancouver	3–6	Toronto		Miller	19,480	4–7–1	9	Recap
13	November 7	Vancouver	2–4	NY Islanders		Miller	12,514	4–8–1	9	Recap
14	November 8	Vancouver	5–3	NY Rangers		Markstrom	18,006	5–8–1	11	Recap
15	November 10	Vancouver	1–3	Detroit		Miller	20,027	5–9–1	11	Recap
16	November 13	Dallas	4–5	Vancouver	OT	Miller	18,470	6–9–1	13	Recap
17	November 15	NY Rangers	7–2	Vancouver		Markstrom	17,814	6–10–1	13	Recap
18	November 17	Arizona	2–3	Vancouver	OT	Markstrom	18,027	7–10–1	15	Recap
19	November 19	Chicago	4–3	Vancouver	OT	Markstrom	18,865	7–10–2	16	Recap
20	November 23	Vancouver	4–1	Arizona		Miller	11,256	8–10–2	18	Recap
21	November 25	Vancouver	1–2	Dallas		Miller	18,532	8–11–2	18	Recap
22	November 26	Vancouver	3–2	Colorado	SO	Markstrom	15,511	9–11–2	20	Recap
23	November 29	Minnesota	4–5	Vancouver		Miller	17,917	10–11–2	22	Recap

December: 7–7–1 (Home: 5–2–1; Road: 2–5–0)
#	Date	Visitor	Score	Home	OT	Decision	Attendance	Record	Pts	Recap
24	December 1	Anaheim	3–1	Vancouver		Miller	17,627	10–12–2	22	Recap
25	December 3	Toronto	2–3	Vancouver	SO	Miller	18,865	11–12–2	24	Recap
26	December 6	Vancouver	2–3	New Jersey		Markstrom	13,126	11–13–2	24	Recap
27	December 8	Vancouver	5–1	Tampa Bay		Miller	19,092	12–13–2	26	Recap
28	December 10	Vancouver	2–4	Florida		Markstrom	17,585	12–14–2	26	Recap
29	December 11	Vancouver	0–3	Washington		Markstrom	18,506	12–15–2	26	Recap
30	December 13	Vancouver	6–8	Carolina		Markstrom	11,721	12–16–2	26	Recap
31	December 16	Tampa Bay	2–4	Vancouver		Miller	18,685	13–16–2	28	Recap
32	December 18	Columbus	4–3	Vancouver	OT	Miller	18,113	13–16–3	29	Recap
33	December 20	Winnipeg	1–4	Vancouver		Markstrom	18,865	14–16–3	31	Recap
34	December 22	Winnipeg	4–1	Vancouver		Miller	18,865	14–17–3	31	Recap
35	December 23	Vancouver	1–4	Calgary		Markstrom	18,840	14–18–3	31	Recap
36	December 28	Los Angeles	1–2	Vancouver		Miller	18,865	15–18–3	33	Recap
37	December 30	Anaheim	2–3	Vancouver	OT	Miller	18,214	16–18–3	35	Recap
38	December 31	Vancouver	3–2	Edmonton	SO	Markstrom	18,347	17–18–3	37	Recap

January: 6–3–3 (Home: 5–0–1; Road: 1–3–2)
#	Date	Visitor	Score	Home	OT	Decision	Attendance	Record	Pts	Recap
39	January 2	Colorado	2–3	Vancouver		Miller	18,865	18–18–3	39	Recap
40	January 4	Arizona	0–3	Vancouver		Miller	18,215	19–18–3	41	Recap
41	January 6	Calgary	2–4	Vancouver		Miller	18,865	20–18–3	43	Recap
42	January 7	Vancouver	1–3	Calgary		Markstrom	18,685	20–19–3	43	Recap
43	January 10	Vancouver	1–2	Nashville	OT	Miller	17,113	20–19–4	44	Recap
44	January 12	Vancouver	4–5	Philadelphia	SO	Miller	19,757	20–19–5	45	Recap
45	January 15	New Jersey	2–1	Vancouver	OT	Markstrom	18,865	20–19–6	46	Recap
46	January 17	Nashville	0–1	Vancouver		Miller	18,312	21–19–6	48	Recap
47	January 20	Florida	1–2	Vancouver		Miller	18,865	22–19–6	50	Recap
48	January 22	Vancouver	2–4	Chicago		Miller	21,689	22–20–6	50	Recap
49	January 25	Vancouver	3–2	Colorado		Markstrom	12,819	23–20–6	52	Recap
50	January 26	Vancouver	0–3	Arizona		Miller	11,203	23–21–6	52	Recap
January 27–29		All-Star Break in Los Angeles

February: 3–8–1 (Home: 1–4–1; Road: 2–4–0)
#	Date	Visitor	Score	Home	OT	Decision	Attendance	Record	Pts	Recap
51	February 2	San Jose	4–1	Vancouver		Miller	18,865	23–22–6	52	Recap
52	February 4	Minnesota	6–3	Vancouver		Miller	18,212	23–23–6	52	Recap
53	February 7	Vancouver	2–4	Nashville		Markstrom	17,113	23–24–6	52	Recap
54	February 9	Vancouver	3–0	Columbus		Miller	13,979	24–24–6	54	Recap
55	February 11	Vancouver	3–4	Boston		Miller	17,565	24–25–6	54	Recap
56	February 12	Vancouver	4–2	Buffalo		Markstrom	18,876	25–25–6	56	Recap
57	February 14	Vancouver	0–4	Pittsburgh		Miller	18,653	25–26–6	56	Recap
58	February 16	Vancouver	3–4	St. Louis		Markstrom	19,291	25–27–6	56	Recap
59	February 18	Calgary	1–2	Vancouver	OT	Miller	18,865	26–27–6	58	Recap
60	February 19	Philadelphia	3–2	Vancouver		Miller	18,865	26–28–6	58	Recap
61	February 25	San Jose	4–1	Vancouver		Miller	18,139	26–29–6	58	Recap
62	February 28	Detroit	3–2	Vancouver	OT	Miller	18,865	26–29–7	59	Recap

March: 4–9–2 (Home: 0–5–2; Road: 4–4–0)
#	Date	Visitor	Score	Home	OT	Decision	Attendance	Record	Pts	Recap
63	March 2	Vancouver	1–3	San Jose		Miller	17,488	26–30–7	59	Recap
64	March 4	Vancouver	4–3	Los Angeles		Miller	18,230	27–30–7	61	Recap
65	March 5	Vancouver	2–1	Anaheim		Bachman	14,523	28–30–7	63	Recap
66	March 7	Montreal	2–1	Vancouver	OT	Miller	18,865	28–30–8	64	Recap
67	March 9	NY Islanders	4–3	Vancouver	OT	Miller	18,406	28–30–9	65	Recap
68	March 11	Pittsburgh	3–0	Vancouver		Miller	18,865	28–31–9	65	Recap
69	March 13	Boston	6–3	Vancouver		Miller	18,865	28–32–9	65	Recap
70	March 16	Dallas	4–2	Vancouver		Miller	18,865	28–33–9	65	Recap
71	March 18	Vancouver	0–2	Edmonton		Bachman	18,347	28–34–9	65	Recap
72	March 21	Vancouver	5–4	Chicago	OT	Miller	21,607	29–34–9	67	Recap
73	March 23	Vancouver	1–4	St. Louis		Miller	19,356	29–35–9	67	Recap
74	March 25	Vancouver	4–2	Minnesota		Bachman	19,184	30–35–9	69	Recap
75	March 26	Vancouver	1–2	Winnipeg		Miller	15,294	30–36–9	69	Recap
76	March 28	Anaheim	4–1	Vancouver		Miller	18,262	30–37–9	69	Recap
77	March 31	Los Angeles	2–0	Vancouver		Miller	18,865	30–38–9	69	Recap

April: 0–5–0 (Home: 0–2–0; Road: 0–3–0)
#	Date	Visitor	Score	Home	OT	Decision	Attendance	Record	Pts	Recap
78	April 2	San Jose	3–1	Vancouver		Miller	18,295	30–39–9	69	Recap
79	April 4	Vancouver	1–3	San Jose		Bachman	17,459	30–40–9	69	Recap
80	April 6	Vancouver	3–4	Arizona		Miller	11,959	30–41–9	69	Recap
81	April 8	Edmonton	3–2	Vancouver		Miller	18,865	30–42–9	69	Recap
82	April 9	Vancouver	2–5	Edmonton		Bachman	18,347	30–43–9	69	Recap

Legend: Win (2 points) Loss (0 points) Overtime/shootout loss (1 point)

=== Detailed records ===
Western Conference
Central Division
Opponent	Home	Away	Total	Pts.	Goals scored	Goals allowed
Chicago Blackhawks	0–0–1	1–1–0	1–1–1	3	10	12
Colorado Avalanche	1–0–0	2–0–0	3–0–0	6	8	6
Dallas Stars	1–1–0	0–1–0	1–2–0	2	8	10
Minnesota Wild	1–1–0	1–0–0	2–1–0	4	11	12
Nashville Predators	1–0–0	0–1–1	1–1–1	3	4	6
St. Louis Blues	1–0–0	0–2–0	1–2–0	2	6	9
Winnipeg Jets	1–1–0	0–1–0	1–2–0	2	6	7
Total	6–3–1	4–6–1	10–9–2	22	54	62
Pacific Division
Opponent	Home	Away	Total	Pts.	Goals scored	Goals allowed
Anaheim Ducks	1–2–0	1–1–0	2–3–0	4	9	14
Arizona Coyotes	2–0–0	1–2–0	3–2–0	6	13	10
Calgary Flames	3–0–0	0–2–0	3–2–0	6	9	11
Edmonton Oilers	0–2–0	1–2–0	1–4–0	2	6	14
Los Angeles Kings	1–1–0	1–0–1	2–1–1	5	9	9
San Jose Sharks	0–3–0	0–2–0	0–5–0	0	5	17
Vancouver Canucks	–	–	–	–	–	–
Total	7–8–0	4–9–1	11–17–1	23	51	75

Eastern Conference
Atlantic Division
Opponent	Home	Away	Total	Pts.	Goals scored	Goals allowed
Boston Bruins	0–1–0	0–1–0	0–2–0	0	5	10
Buffalo Sabres	1–0–0	1–0–0	2–0–0	4	6	3
Detroit Red Wings	0–0–1	0–1–0	0–1–1	1	3	6
Florida Panthers	1–0–0	0–1–0	1–1–0	2	4	5
Montreal Canadiens	0–0–1	0–1–0	0–1–1	1	1	5
Ottawa Senators	0–1–0	0–1–0	0–2–0	0	0	4
Tampa Bay Lightning	1–0–0	1–0–0	2–0–0	4	9	3
Toronto Maple Leafs	1–0–0	0–1–0	1–1–0	2	5	8
Total	4–2–2	2–6–0	6–8–2	14	34	44
Metropolitan Division
Opponent	Home	Away	Total	Pts.	Goals scored	Goals allowed
Carolina Hurricanes	1–0–0	0–1–0	1–1–0	2	10	11
Columbus Blue Jackets	0–0–1	1–0–0	1–0–1	3	6	4
New Jersey Devils	0–0–1	0–1–0	0–1–1	1	3	5
New York Islanders	0–0–1	0–1–0	0–1–1	1	5	8
New York Rangers	0–1–0	1–0–0	1–1–0	2	7	10
Philadelphia Flyers	0–1–0	0–0–1	0–1–1	1	6	7
Pittsburgh Penguins	0–1–0	0–1–0	0–2–0	0	0	7
Washington Capitals	0–1–0	0–1–0	0–2–0	0	2	8
Total	1–4–3	2–5–1	3–9–4	10	39	60

== Player statistics ==
Final stats

=== Skaters ===
Regular season
Player	GP	G	A	Pts	+/−	PIM
Bo Horvat	81	20	32	52	−7	27
Henrik Sedin	82	15	35	50	−27	28
Daniel Sedin	82	15	29	44	−16	32
Sven Baertschi	68	18	17	35	−6	8
Brandon Sutter	81	17	17	34	−20	12
Markus Granlund	69	19	13	32	−19	14
Loui Eriksson	65	11	13	24	−9	8
Troy Stecher	71	3	21	24	−16	25
Alexander Edler	68	6	15	21	−20	36
Alex Burrows^{‡}	55	9	11	20	−3	53
Ben Hutton	71	5	14	19	−22	31
Jannik Hansen^{‡}	28	6	7	13	2	27
Luca Sbisa	82	2	11	13	−1	40
Christopher Tanev	53	2	8	10	3	14
Jack Skille	55	5	4	9	0	12
Michael Chaput	68	4	5	9	−12	29
Nikita Tryamkin	66	2	7	9	−7	64
Jayson Megna	58	4	4	8	−4	6
Reid Boucher^{†}	27	5	2	7	−7	6
Erik Gudbranson	30	1	5	6	−14	18
Philip Larsen	26	1	5	6	−8	4
Brock Boeser	9	4	1	5	0	0
Brendan Gaunce	57	0	5	5	−2	33
Derek Dorsett	14	1	3	4	−6	33
Nikolay Goldobin^{†}	12	3	0	3	1	0
Alex Biega	36	0	3	3	−4	18
Drew Shore	14	0	2	2	−3	4
Anton Rodin	3	0	1	1	1	0
Jake Virtanen	10	0	1	1	1	2
Borna Rendulic	1	0	0	0	0	0
Evan McEneny	1	0	0	0	−1	0
Mike Zalewski	1	0	0	0	−1	0
Alexandre Grenier	3	0	0	0	−1	0
Griffen Molino	5	0	0	0	−2	0
Joseph Cramarossa^{†}	10	0	0	0	−1	9
Joseph LaBate	13	0	0	0	−2	21
Totals	82	178	292	470	−233	638

=== Goaltenders ===
Regular season
Player	GP	GS	TOI	W	L	OT	GA	GAA	SA	SV%	SO	G	A	PIM
Jacob Markstrom	26	23	1416:58	10	11	3	62	2.63	692	.910	0	0	0	2
Ryan Miller	54	54	3211:51	18	29	6	150	2.80	1737	.914	3	0	1	22
Richard Bachman	5	5	295:11	2	3	0	13	2.64	162	.920	0	0	0	0
Totals		82	4924:59	30	43	9	225	2.74	2,591	0.913	3	0	1	24

^{†}Acquired by Canucks mid-season. Stats reflect time with Canucks only.
^{‡}Acquired by another team mid-season. Stats reflect time with Canucks only.

== Awards and honours ==
=== Awards ===
Regular season
Player	Award	Awarded
Bo Horvat	NHL All-Star Game selection	January 10, 2017

=== Milestones ===
Regular season
Player	Milestone	Date
Brendan Gaunce	1st career NHL assist	October 16, 2016
Jannik Hansen	100th career NHL goal	October 20, 2016
Christopher Tanev	300th career NHL game	October 22, 2016
Troy Stecher	1st career NHL game	October 25, 2016
Brandon Sutter	200th career NHL point	November 5, 2016
Troy Stecher	1st career NHL assist 1st career NHL point	November 5, 2016
Troy Stecher	1st career NHL goal	November 13, 2016
Luca Sbisa	400th career NHL game	November 15, 2016
Joseph LaBate	1st career NHL game	November 23, 2016
Ben Hutton	100th career NHL game	December 3, 2016
Jacob Markstrom	100th career NHL game	December 13, 2016
Brandon Sutter	100th career NHL assist	December 13, 2016
Loui Eriksson	300th career NHL assist	December 16, 2016
Henrik Sedin	1200th career NHL game	December 22, 2016
Anton Rodin	1st career NHL game	December 23, 2016
Alex Burrows	800th career NHL game	December 30, 2016
Anton Rodin	1st career NHL assist 1st career NHL point	January 2, 2017
Daniel Sedin	600th career NHL assist	January 2, 2017
Henrik Sedin	1,000th career NHL point	January 20, 2017
Bo Horvat	200th career NHL game	January 26, 2017
Michael Chaput	100th career NHL game	February 9, 2017
Bo Horvat	100th career NHL point	February 11, 2017
Daniel Sedin	1,200th career NHL game	February 14, 2017
Evan McEneny	1st career NHL game	February 25, 2017
Jayson Megna	100th career NHL game	March 5, 2017
Ryan Miller	700th career NHL game	March 13, 2017
Reid Boucher	100th career NHL game	March 16, 2017
Sven Baertschi	200th career NHL game	March 25, 2017
Brock Boeser	1st career NHL game 1st career NHL goal 1st career NHL point	March 25, 2017
Griffen Molino	1st career NHL game	March 31, 2017
Brock Boeser	1st career NHL assist	April 4, 2017
Ryan Miller	700th career NHL start	April 6, 2017
Alexander Edler	300th career NHL point	April 8, 2017

== Transactions ==
The Canucks been involved in the following transactions:

=== Trades ===
Date	Details		Ref
May 25, 2016	To Vancouver Canucks: Erik Gudbranson; NYI's 5th-round pick in 2016	To Florida Panthers: Jared McCann; 2nd-round pick in 2016; 4th-round pick in 2016
February 27, 2017	To Vancouver Canucks: Jonathan Dahlen	To Ottawa Senators: Alex Burrows
February 28, 2017	To Vancouver Canucks: Nikolay Goldobin; Conditional 4th-round pick in 2017	To San Jose Sharks: Jannik Hansen

=== Free agents acquired ===
Player	Date	Former team	Contract terms (in U.S. dollars)	Ref
Troy Stecher	April 13, 2016	University of North Dakota	2-year, $925,000 entry-level contract	
Michael Garteig	April 29, 2016	Quinnipiac University	1 year, $925,000 entry-level contract	
Yan-Pavel Laplante	May 16, 2016	Gatineau Olympiques	3-year, $836,667 entry-level contract	
Loui Eriksson	July 1, 2016	Boston Bruins	6-year, $36 million	
Jayson Megna	July 1, 2016	New York Rangers	1 year, $600,000	
Michael Chaput	July 1, 2016	Columbus Blue Jackets	1 year, $600,000	
Borna Rendulic	July 1, 2016	Colorado Avalanche	1 year, $575,000	
Chad Billins	July 1, 2016	Linkopings HC (SHL)	1 year, $600,000	
Michael Carcone	July 15, 2016	Drummondville Voltigeurs	3-year, $675,000 entry-level contract	
Jack Skille	October 13, 2016	Colorado Avalanche	1 year, $700,000	
Zack MacEwen	March 3, 2017	Gatineau Olympiques	3-year, $847,500 entry-level contract	
Drew Shore	March 12, 2017	EHC Kloten	1 year, $600,000	
Jalen Chatfield	March 13, 2017	Windsor Spitfires	3-year, $765,000 entry-level contract	
Griffen Molino	March 28, 2017	Western Michigan University	2-year, $925,000 entry-level contract	
Philip Holm	May 26, 2017	Vaxjo Lakers	1 year, $925,000 entry-level	

=== Free agents lost ===
Player	Date	New team	Contract terms (in U.S. dollars)	Ref
Dan Hamhuis	July 1, 2016	Dallas Stars	2 years, $7.5 million	
Yannick Weber	July 1, 2016	Nashville Predators	1 year, $575,000	
Linden Vey	July 5, 2016	Calgary Flames	1 year, $700,000	
Radim Vrbata	August 16, 2016	Arizona Coyotes	1 year, $1 million	
Brandon Prust	August 22, 2016	Toronto Maple Leafs	Professional Tryout (PTO)	
Chris Higgins	August 30, 2016	Calgary Flames	Professional Tryout (PTO)	
Matt Bartkowski	September 16, 2016	Ottawa Senators	Professional Tryout (PTO)	

=== Claimed via waivers ===
Player	Previous team	Date	Ref
Reid Boucher	New Jersey Devils	January 4, 2017	
Joseph Cramarossa	Anaheim Ducks	March 1, 2017	

=== Lost via waivers ===
Player	New team	Date claimed off waivers	Ref
Emerson Etem	Anaheim Ducks	October 13, 2016	

=== Player signings ===
Player	Date	Contract terms (in U.S. dollars)	Ref
Anton Rodin	March 22, 2016	1 year, $950,000	
Thatcher Demko	April 20, 2016	3-year, $925,000 entry-level contract	
Sven Baertschi	June 16, 2016	2 years, $3.7 million	
Emerson Etem	June 27, 2016	1 year, $775,000	
Philip Larsen	July 1, 2016	1 year, $1.025 million	
Jacob Markstrom	July 7, 2016	3-year, $11 million contract extension	
Olli Juolevi	August 5, 2016	3-year, $925,000 entry-level contract	
Ben Hutton	November 24, 2016	2-year, $5.6 million contract extension	
Brock Boeser	March 25, 2017	3-year, $925,000 entry-level contract	
Jayson Megna	April 2, 2017	1 year, $675,000 contract extension	
Jonathan Dahlen	April 21, 2017	3 years, $2.775 million entry-level	
Andrey Pedan	May 3, 2017	1 year, $750,000 contract extension	
Erik Gudbranson	June 15, 2017	1 year, $3.5 million contract extension	

== Draft picks ==
Below are the Vancouver Canucks' selections at the 2016 NHL entry draft, to be held on June 24–25, 2016, at the First Niagara Center in Buffalo, New York.

Round	#	Player	Pos	Nationality	College/Junior/Club team (League)
1	5	Olli Juolevi	D	Finland	London Knights (OHL)
3	64	William Lockwood	RW	United States	U.S. NTDP (USHL)
5	140^{[a]}	Cole Candella	D	Canada	Hamilton Bulldogs (OHL)
6	154	Jakob Stukel	LW	Canada	Calgary Hitmen (WHL)
7	184	Rodrigo Abols	C	Latvia	Portland Winterhawks (WHL)
7	194^{[b]}	Brett McKenzie	C	Canada	North Bay Battalion (OHL)

Draft notes

- The Vancouver Canucks' second-round pick went to the Buffalo Sabres as the result of a trade on June 25, 2016, that sent Mark Pysyk, a second-round pick and St. Louis' third-round pick both in 2016 (38th and 89th overall) to Florida in exchange for Dmitri Kulikov and this pick. Florida previously acquired this pick as the result of a trade on May 25, 2016, that sent Erik Gudbranson and the Islanders' fifth-round pick in 2016 to Vancouver in exchange for Jared McCann, a fourth-round pick in 2016 and this pick.
- The Vancouver Canucks' fourth-round pick went to the Florida Panthers as the result of a trade on May 25, 2016, that sent Erik Gudbranson and the Islanders' fifth-round pick in 2016 to Vancouver in exchange for Jared McCann, a second-round pick in 2016 and this pick.
- The Vancouver Canucks' fifth-round pick went to the Montreal Canadiens as the result of a trade on July 1, 2015, that sent Brandon Prust to Vancouver in exchange for Zack Kassian and this pick.
- ^{a} The New York Islanders' fifth-round pick went to the Vancouver Canucks as the result of a trade on May 25, 2016, that sent Jared McCann, a second and fourth-round pick both in 2016 to Florida in exchange for Erik Gudbranson and this pick. Florida previously acquired this pick as the result of a trade on June 27, 2015, that sent Montreal's fifth-round pick in 2015 to New York in exchange for this pick.
- ^{b} The Carolina Hurricanes' seventh-round pick went to the Vancouver Canucks as the result of a trade on June 27, 2015, that sent Eddie Lack to Carolina in exchange for a third-round pick in 2015 and this pick.
