= 2016–17 Anaheim Ducks season =

NHL team season

2016–17 Anaheim Ducks
- Pacific Division champions
- Division: 1st Pacific
- Conference: 3rd Western
- 2016–17 record: 46–23–13
- Home record: 29–8–4
- Road record: 17–15–9
- Goals for: 223
- Goals against: 200

Team information
- General manager: Bob Murray
- Coach: Randy Carlyle
- Captain: Ryan Getzlaf
- Alternate captains: Ryan Kesler; Corey Perry
- Arena: Honda Center
- Minor league affiliates: San Diego Gulls (AHL); Utah Grizzlies (ECHL)

Team leaders
- Goals: Rickard Rakell (33)
- Assists: Ryan Getzlaf (58)
- Points: Ryan Getzlaf (73)
- Penalty minutes: Jared Boll (87)
- Plus/minus: Josh Manson (+14)
- Wins: John Gibson (25)
- Goals against average: John Gibson (2.22)

The 2016–17 Anaheim Ducks season was the 24th season for the National Hockey League (NHL) franchise that was established on June 15, 1993. The Ducks won the Pacific Division for a fifth straight year and the sixth time in franchise history. Anaheim faced the wild-card entrant Calgary Flames in the opening round of the playoffs, where they defeated them in a four-game sweep. They then defeated the Edmonton Oilers in the next round, four games to three. The Ducks then went on to face the Nashville Predators in the Western Conference Finals, where they lost in six games.

The Ducks' qualification to the 2017 Stanley Cup Finals would have been the Ducks' first Finals appearance since 2007 and coincidentally, they were close to rematching the Ottawa Senators for the Stanley Cup prior to Ottawa's elimination by the eventual champion Pittsburgh Penguins in the Eastern Conference Finals in seven games.

== Standings ==
Pacific Division
Pos	Team	GP	W	L	OTL	ROW	GF	GA	GD	Pts
1	y – Anaheim Ducks	82	46	23	13	43	223	200	+23	105
2	x – Edmonton Oilers	82	47	26	9	43	247	212	+35	103
3	x – San Jose Sharks	82	46	29	7	44	221	201	+20	99
4	x – Calgary Flames	82	45	33	4	41	226	221	+5	94
5	Los Angeles Kings	82	39	35	8	37	201	205	−4	86
6	Arizona Coyotes	82	30	42	10	24	197	260	−63	70
7	Vancouver Canucks	82	30	43	9	26	182	243	−61	69

Source: National Hockey League
x – Clinched playoff spot; y – Clinched division

== Schedule and results ==
=== Preseason ===
2016 pre-season game log: 2–4–1 (Home: 1–2–0; Road: 1–2–1)
#	Date	Visitor	Score	Home	OT	Win	Loss	Attendance	Record	Boxscore
1	September 27	Arizona	2–1	Anaheim		Peters (1–0–0)	Boyle (0–1–0)	14,609	0–1–0	L1
2	September 28	Anaheim	1–6	Los Angeles		Budaj (1–0–0)	Tokarski (0–1–0)	14,810	0–2–0	L2
3	October 1	Anaheim	2–3	Arizona	OT	Smith	Bernier (0–0–1)	7,181	0–2–1	O1
4	October 2	Los Angeles	1–0	Anaheim		Quick	Bernier (0–1–1)	15,837	0–3–1	L1
5	October 4	Anaheim	1–2	Edmonton		Talbot	Gibson (0–1–0)	18,500	0–4–1	L2
6	October 5	Anaheim	2–0	San Jose		Bernier (1–1–1)	Jones	16,207	1–4–1	W1
7	October 9	San Jose	2–3	Anaheim	OT	Bernier (2–1–1)	Dell	16,444	2–4–1	W2

=== Regular season ===
2016–17 game log

October: 3–4–2 (Home: 2–1–0; Road: 1–3–2)
#	Date	Visitor	Score	Home	OT	Decision	Attendance	Record	Pts	Recap
1	October 13	Anaheim	2–4	Dallas		Gibson	18,532	0–1–0	0	L1
2	October 15	Anaheim	2–3	Pittsburgh		Bernier	18,452	0–2–0	0	L2
3	October 16	Anaheim	2–3	NY Islanders	OT	Gibson	15,795	0–2–1	1	O1
4	October 18	Anaheim	1–2	New Jersey		Gibson	16,514	0–3–1	1	L1
5	October 20	Anaheim	3–2	Philadelphia		Gibson	19,982	1–3–1	3	W1
6	October 23	Vancouver	2–4	Anaheim		Gibson	17,174	2–3–1	5	W2
7	October 25	Anaheim	1–2	San Jose	OT	Gibson	17,562	2–3–2	6	O1
8	October 26	Nashville	1–6	Anaheim		Gibson	15,421	3–3–2	8	W1
9	October 28	Columbus	4–0	Anaheim		Gibson	15,841	3–4–2	8	L1

November: 8–4–2 (Home: 5–3–1; Road: 3–1–1)
#	Date	Visitor	Score	Home	OT	Decision	Attendance	Record	Pts	Recap
10	November 1	Anaheim	4–0	Los Angeles		Gibson	18,230	4–4–2	10	W1
11	November 2	Pittsburgh	5–1	Anaheim		Gibson	15,543	4–5–2	10	L1
12	November 4	Arizona	1–5	Anaheim		Gibson	16,405	5–5–2	12	W1
13	November 6	Calgary	1–4	Anaheim		Bernier	16,218	6–5–2	14	W2
14	November 9	Anaheim	2–3	Columbus	OT	Gibson	10,250	6–5–3	15	O1
15	November 10	Anaheim	4–2	Carolina		Bernier	8,086	7–5–3	17	W1
16	November 12	Anaheim	0–5	Nashville		Gibson	17,309	7–6–3	17	L1
17	November 15	Edmonton	1–4	Anaheim		Gibson	15,600	8–6–3	19	W1
18	November 17	New Jersey	2–3	Anaheim		Bernier	14,954	9–6–3	21	W2
19	November 20	Los Angeles	3–2	Anaheim		Gibson	16,611	9–7–3	21	L1
20	November 22	NY Islanders	3–2	Anaheim	SO	Bernier	15,161	9–7–4	22	O1
21	November 25	Chicago	3–2	Anaheim		Gibson	17,174	9–8–4	22	L1
22	November 26	Anaheim	3–2	San Jose		Bernier	17,562	10–8–4	24	W1
23	November 29	Montreal	1–2	Anaheim		Gibson	14,830	11–8–4	26	W2

December: 7–4–4 (Home: 3–0–1; Road: 4–4–3)
#	Date	Visitor	Score	Home	OT	Decision	Attendance	Record	Pts	Recap
24	December 1	Anaheim	3–1	Vancouver		Gibson	17,627	12–8–4	28	W3
25	December 3	Anaheim	2–3	Edmonton	OT	Gibson	18,347	12–8–5	29	O1
26	December 4	Anaheim	3–8	Calgary		Bernier	17,840	12–9–5	29	L1
27	December 7	Carolina	5–6	Anaheim	SO	Gibson	14,582	13–9–5	31	W1
28	December 9	San Jose	2–3	Anaheim		Bernier	17,174	14–9–5	33	W2
29	December 11	Ottawa	1–5	Anaheim		Gibson	15,714	15–9–5	35	W3
30	December 13	Anaheim	2–6	Dallas		Gibson	17,543	15–10–5	35	L1
31	December 15	Anaheim	4–3	Boston		Bernier	17,565	16–10–5	37	W1
32	December 17	Anaheim	4–6	Detroit		Gibson	20,027	16–11–5	37	L1
33	December 19	Anaheim	3–2	Toronto		Gibson	18,861	17–11–5	39	W1
34	December 20	Anaheim	1–5	Montreal		Bernier	21,288	17–12–5	39	L1
35	December 22	Anaheim	1–2	Ottawa	OT	Gibson	17,125	17–12–6	40	O1
36	December 27	San Jose	3–2	Anaheim	OT	Gibson	17,403	17–12–7	41	O2
37	December 29	Anaheim	3–1	Calgary		Gibson	19,289	18–12–7	43	W1
38	December 30	Anaheim	2–3	Vancouver	OT	Gibson	18,214	18–12–8	44	O1

January: 10–3–1 (Home: 7–2–1; Road: 3–1–0)
#	Date	Visitor	Score	Home	OT	Decision	Attendance	Record	Pts	Recap
39	January 1	Philadelphia	3–4	Anaheim	SO	Gibson	17,174	19–12–8	46	W1
40	January 4	Detroit	0–2	Anaheim		Gibson	17,174	20–12–8	48	W2
41	January 6	Arizona	2–3	Anaheim	OT	Gibson	15,415	21–12–8	50	W3
42	January 8	Minnesota	2–1	Anaheim		Gibson	15,645	21–13–8	50	L1
43	January 10	Dallas	0–2	Anaheim		Gibson	15,073	22–13–8	52	W1
44	January 12	Anaheim	4–1	Colorado		Gibson	14,589	23–13–8	54	W2
45	January 14	Anaheim	3–0	Arizona		Bernier	12,015	24–13–8	56	W3
46	January 15	St. Louis	2–1	Anaheim	OT	Gibson	17,174	24–13–9	57	O1
47	January 17	Tampa Bay	1–2	Anaheim	OT	Gibson	14,763	25–13–9	59	W1
48	January 19	Colorado	1–2	Anaheim		Gibson	15,414	26–13–9	61	W2
49	January 21	Anaheim	3–5	Minnesota		Bernier	19,288	26–14–9	61	L1
50	January 23	Anaheim	3–2	Winnipeg		Bernier	15,294	27–14–9	63	W1
51	January 25	Edmonton	4–0	Anaheim		Gibson	17,174	27–15–9	63	L1
January 26–29		All-Star Break in Los Angeles (Metropolitan wins tournament)
52	January 31	Colorado	1–5	Anaheim		Gibson	15,963	28–15–9	65	W1

February: 4–6–1 (Home: 2–1–0; Road: 2–5–1)
#	Date	Visitor	Score	Home	OT	Decision	Attendance	Record	Pts	Recap
53	February 3	Anaheim	1–2	Florida		Gibson	14,689	28–16–9	65	L1
54	February 4	Anaheim	2–3	Tampa Bay	SO	Bernier	19,092	28–16–10	66	O1
55	February 7	Anaheim	1–4	NY Rangers		Gibson	18,006	28–17–10	66	L1
56	February 9	Anaheim	5–2	Buffalo		Gibson	18,027	29–17–10	68	W1
57	February 11	Anaheim	4–6	Washington		Gibson	18,506	29–18–10	68	L1
58	February 14	Anaheim	1–0	Minnesota		Gibson	19,047	30–18–10	70	W1
59	February 17	Florida	4–1	Anaheim		Gibson	16,339	30–19–10	70	L1
60	February 19	Los Angeles	0–1	Anaheim		Gibson	17,174	31–19–10	72	W1
61	February 20	Anaheim	2–3	Arizona		Bernier	14,554	31–20–10	72	L1
62	February 22	Boston	3–5	Anaheim		Bernier	15,135	32–20–10	74	W1
63	February 25	Anaheim	1–4	Los Angeles		Bernier	18,230	32–21–10	74	L1

March: 10–2–2 (Home: 7–1–1; Road: 3–1–1)
#	Date	Visitor	Score	Home	OT	Decision	Attendance	Record	Pts	Recap
64	March 3	Toronto	2–5	Anaheim		Bernier	16,293	33–21–10	76	W1
65	March 5	Vancouver	2–1	Anaheim		Bernier	14,523	33–22–10	76	L1
66	March 7	Nashville	3–4	Anaheim	SO	Bernier	14,622	34–22–10	78	W1
67	March 9	Anaheim	1–0	Chicago		Bernier	21,838	35–22–10	80	W2
68	March 10	Anaheim	3–4	St. Louis		Gibson	19,358	35–23–10	80	L1
69	March 12	Washington	2–5	Anaheim		Bernier	17,174	36–23–10	82	W1
70	March 15	St. Louis	1–2	Anaheim		Bernier	14,760	37–23–10	84	W2
71	March 17	Buffalo	2–1	Anaheim	SO	Bernier	14,556	37–23–11	85	O1
72	March 18	Anaheim	2–1	San Jose		Bernier	17,562	38–23–11	87	W1
73	March 22	Edmonton	3–4	Anaheim		Bernier	15,310	39–23–11	89	W2
74	March 24	Winnipeg	1–3	Anaheim		Bernier	15,647	40–23–11	91	W3
75	March 26	NY Rangers	3–6	Anaheim		Bernier	17,174	41–23–11	93	W4
76	March 28	Anaheim	4–1	Vancouver		Bernier	18,262	42–23–11	95	W5
77	March 30	Anaheim	3–4	Winnipeg	OT	Bernier	15,294	42–23–12	96	O1

April: 4–0–1 (Home: 3–0–0; Road: 1–0–1)
#	Date	Visitor	Score	Home	OT	Decision	Attendance	Record	Pts	Recap
78	April 1	Anaheim	2–3	Edmonton	OT	Gibson	18,347	42–23–13	97	O2
79	April 2	Anaheim	4–3	Calgary		Bernier	18,945	43–23–13	99	W1
80	April 4	Calgary	1–3	Anaheim		Gibson	15,125	44–23–13	101	W2
81	April 6	Chicago	0–4	Anaheim		Gibson	16,462	45–23–13	103	W3
82	April 9	Los Angeles	3–4	Anaheim	OT	Bernier	16,564	46–23–13	105	W4

Legend: Win (2 points) Loss (0 points) Overtime/shootout loss (1 point)

=== Playoffs ===
2017 Stanley Cup playoffs

Western Conference First Round vs. (WC1) Calgary Flames: Anaheim wins 4–0
#	Date	Visitor	Score	Home	OT	Decision	Attendance	Series	Recap
1	April 13	Calgary	2–3	Anaheim		Gibson	17,174	1–0	Recap
2	April 15	Calgary	2–3	Anaheim		Gibson	17,271	2–0	Recap
3	April 17	Anaheim	5–4	Calgary	OT	Bernier	19,289	3–0	Recap
4	April 19	Anaheim	3–1	Calgary		Gibson	19,289	4–0	Recap

Western Conference Second Round vs. (P2) Edmonton Oilers: Anaheim wins 4–3
#	Date	Visitor	Score	Home	OT	Decision	Attendance	Series	Recap
1	April 26	Edmonton	5–3	Anaheim		Gibson	17,174	0–1	Recap
2	April 28	Edmonton	2–1	Anaheim		Gibson	17,174	0–2	Recap
3	April 30	Anaheim	6–3	Edmonton		Gibson	18,347	1–2	Recap
4	May 3	Anaheim	4–3	Edmonton	OT	Gibson	18,347	2–2	Recap
5	May 5	Edmonton	3–4	Anaheim	2OT	Gibson	17,358	3–2	Recap
6	May 7	Anaheim	1–7	Edmonton		Gibson	18,347	3–3	Recap
7	May 10	Edmonton	1–2	Anaheim		Gibson	17,407	4–3	Recap

Western Conference Finals vs. (WC2) Nashville Predators: Nashville wins 4–2
#	Date	Visitor	Score	Home	OT	Decision	Attendance	Series	Recap
1	May 12	Nashville	3–2	Anaheim	OT	Gibson	17,174	0–1	Recap
2	May 14	Nashville	3–5	Anaheim		Gibson	17,174	1–1	Recap
3	May 16	Anaheim	1–2	Nashville		Gibson	17,338	1–2	Recap
4	May 18	Anaheim	3–2	Nashville	OT	Gibson	17,423	2–2	Recap
5	May 20	Nashville	3–1	Anaheim		Bernier	17,307	2–3	Recap
6	May 22	Anaheim	3–6	Nashville		Bernier	17,352	2–4	Recap

Legend: Win Loss

== Player statistics ==
Final stats

=== Skaters ===
Regular season
Player	GP	G	A	Pts	+/−	PIM
Ryan Getzlaf	74	15	58	73	7	49
Ryan Kesler	82	22	36	58	8	83
Corey Perry	82	19	34	53	2	76
Rickard Rakell	71	33	18	51	10	12
Jakob Silfverberg	79	23	26	49	10	20
Cam Fowler	80	11	28	39	7	20
Andrew Cogliano	82	16	19	35	11	26
Nick Ritchie	77	14	14	28	4	62
Antoine Vermette	72	9	19	28	−7	42
Sami Vatanen	71	3	21	24	3	30
Hampus Lindholm	66	6	14	20	13	36
Josh Manson	82	5	12	17	14	82
Ondrej Kase	53	5	10	15	−1	18
Patrick Eaves^{†}	20	11	3	14	8	8
Kevin Bieksa	81	3	11	14	0	63
Joseph Cramarossa^{‡}	49	4	6	10	1	51
Logan Shaw	55	3	7	10	3	10
Shea Theodore	34	2	7	9	−6	28
Chris Wagner	43	6	1	7	2	6
Korbinian Holzer	32	2	5	7	0	23
Brandon Montour	27	2	4	6	11	14
Ryan Garbutt	27	2	1	3	−3	20
Clayton Stoner	14	1	2	3	0	28
Jared Boll	51	0	3	3	−3	87
Stefan Noesen^{‡}	12	2	0	2	2	2
Nate Thompson	30	1	1	2	4	14
Michael Sgarbossa^{‡}	9	0	2	2	−2	0
Nick Sorensen	5	0	1	1	−1	2
Simon Despres	1	0	0	0	0	0
Emerson Etem	3	0	0	0	1	2
Nicolas Kerdiles	1	0	0	0	1	0
Kalle Kossila	1	0	0	0	0	0
Jacob Larsson	4	0	0	0	−1	2
Jaycob Megna	1	0	0	0	1	0
Mason Raymond	4	0	0	0	−2	0
Corey Tropp	1	0	0	0	−1	0

Playoffs
Player	GP	G	A	Pts	+/−	PIM
Ryan Getzlaf	17	8	11	19	7	8
Jakob Silfverberg	17	9	5	14	−4	6
Rickard Rakell	15	7	6	13	13	0
Corey Perry	17	4	7	11	4	34
Cam Fowler	13	2	7	9	−6	2
Shea Theodore	14	2	6	8	4	2
Ryan Kesler	17	1	7	8	−6	32
Brandon Montour	17	0	7	7	12	4
Nate Thompson	17	2	4	6	6	6
Sami Vatanen	12	1	5	6	−5	4
Nick Ritchie	15	4	0	4	−1	46
Patrick Eaves	7	2	2	4	0	6
Hampus Lindholm	17	1	3	4	8	10
Kevin Bieksa	8	0	4	4	5	23
Chris Wagner	17	3	0	3	1	6
Andrew Cogliano	17	1	2	3	−3	9
Antoine Vermette	17	1	2	3	−3	2
Josh Manson	17	0	3	3	−2	20
Ondrej Kase	9	2	0	2	2	4
Nicolas Kerdiles	4	0	1	1	2	0
Jared Boll	8	0	0	0	−1	5
Korbinian Holzer	5	0	0	0	0	18
Logan Shaw	9	0	0	0	0	4

=== Goaltenders ===
Regular season
Player	GP	GS	TOI	W	L	OT	GA	GAA	SA	SV%	SO	G	A	PIM
John Gibson	52	49	2950:21	25	16	9	109	2.22	1437	0.924	6	0	1	4
Jonathan Bernier	39	33	1993:11	21	7	4	83	2.50	982	0.915	2	0	0	4
Dustin Tokarski	1	0	9:47	0	0	0	0	0.00	5	1.000	0	0	0	0

Playoffs
Player	GP	GS	TOI	W	L	GA	GAA	SA	SV%	SO	G	A	PIM
John Gibson	16	16	878:42	9	5	38	2.59	466	0.918	0	0	0	0
Jonathan Bernier	4	1	182:34	1	2	10	2.82	78	0.886	0	0	0	0

^{†}Denotes player spent time with another team before joining the Ducks. Stats reflect time with the Ducks only.
^{‡}Denotes player was traded mid-season. Stats reflect time with the Team only.
Bold/italics denotes franchise record.

== Awards and honours ==
=== Records ===
- On November 6, 2016, the Ducks set the NHL record for most consecutive victories over a single opponent with 24 wins.

== Transactions ==
Following the end of the Ducks' 2015–16 season, and during the 2016–17 season, this team has been involved in the following transactions:

=== Trades ===
Date	Details		Ref
July 5, 2016	To Toronto Maple Leafs Conditional pick in 2017	To Anaheim Ducks Jonathan Bernier
November 16, 2016	To Florida Panthers Michael Sgarbossa	To Anaheim Ducks Logan Shaw
January 10, 2017	To Toronto Maple Leafs 7th-round pick in 2018	To Anaheim Ducks Jhonas Enroth
January 19, 2017	To Nashville Predators Andrew O'Brien	To Anaheim Ducks Max Gortz
February 24, 2017	To Dallas Stars Conditional 2nd-round pick in 2017	To Anaheim Ducks Patrick Eaves
March 1, 2017	To Chicago Blackhawks Kenton Helgesen; 7th-round pick in 2019	To Anaheim Ducks Sam Carrick; Spencer Abbott

=== Free agents acquired ===
Date	Player	Former team	Contract terms (in U.S. dollars)	Ref
July 2, 2016	Nate Guenin	Colorado Avalanche	1 year, $600,000	
July 5, 2016	Jared Boll	Columbus Blue Jackets	2 years, $1.8 million	
July 5, 2016	Jeff Schultz	Ontario Reign	1 year, $575,000	
July 5, 2016	Mason Raymond	Calgary Flames	1 year, $675,000	
August 15, 2016	Antoine Vermette	Arizona Coyotes	2 years, $3.5 million	
January 28, 2017	Ryan Faragher	Utah Grizzlies	1 year, $575,000	
March 20, 2017	Mitch Hults	Lake Superior State University	2 years, $1.850 million entry-level contract	
March 31, 2017	Angus Redmond	Michigan Technological University	3 years, $2.775 million entry-level contract	
April 18, 2017	Giovanni Fiore	Cape Breton Screaming Eagles	3 years, $2.105 million entry-level contract	

=== Free agents lost ===
Date	Player	New team	Contract terms (in U.S. dollars)	Ref
July 1, 2016	Jamie McGinn	Arizona Coyotes	3 years, $10 million	
July 1, 2016	Chris Stewart	Minnesota Wild	2 years, $2.3 million	
July 1, 2016	David Perron	St. Louis Blues	2 years, $7.5 million	
July 1, 2016	Anton Khudobin	Boston Bruins	2 years, $2.4 million	
August 26, 2016	Brandon Pirri	New York Rangers	1 year, $1.1 million	

=== Claimed via waivers ===
Player	Former team	Date claimed off waivers	Ref
Emerson Etem	Vancouver Canucks	October 13, 2016	

=== Lost via waivers ===
Player	New team	Date claimed off waivers	Ref
Stefan Noesen	New Jersey Devils	January 25, 2017	
Joseph Cramarossa	Vancouver Canucks	March 1, 2017	

=== Lost via retirement ===
Date	Player	Ref

=== Player signings ===
The following players were signed by the Ducks. Two-way contracts are marked with an asterisk (*).

Date	Player	Contract terms (in U.S. dollars)	Ref
June 27, 2016	Corey Tropp	2 years, $1.25 million	
June 27, 2016	Dustin Tokarski	1 year, $600,000	
July 12, 2016	Korbinian Holzer	1 year, $700,000	
July 25, 2016	Stefan Noesen	1 year, $600,000	
August 5, 2016	Deven Sideroff	3 years, $2.775 million entry-level contract	
August 26, 2016	Max Jones	3 years, $2.775 million entry-level contract	
October 14, 2016	Rickard Rakell	6 years, $22.8 million contract extension	
October 27, 2016	Hampus Lindholm	6 years, $31.5 million contract extension	
December 21, 2016	Sam Steel	3 years, $2.775 million entry-level contract	
January 6, 2017	Dustin Tokarski	1 year, $650,000 contract extension	
March 3, 2017	Logan Shaw	1 year, $650,000 contract extension	
April 22, 2017	Jack Kopacka	3 years, $2.775 million entry-level contract	
May 17, 2017	Josh Mahura	3 years, $2.775 million entry-level contract	
June 5, 2017	Sam Carrick	2 years, $1.3 million contract extension	
June 17, 2017	Nicolas Kerdiles	1 year, $650,000 contract extension	

== Draft picks ==
Below are the Anaheim Ducks' selections at the 2016 NHL entry draft, which was held on June 24–25, 2016, at the First Niagara Center in Buffalo.

Round	#	Player	Pos	Nationality	College/Junior/Club team (League)
1	24	Max Jones	LW	United States	London Knights (OHL)
1	30^{[a]}	Sam Steel	C	Canada	Regina Pats (WHL)
3	85	Joshua Mahura	D	Canada	Red Deer Rebels (WHL)
4	93^{[b]}	Jack Kopacka	LW	United States	Sault Ste. Marie Greyhounds (OHL)
4	115	Alex Dostie	C	Canada	Gatineau Olympiques (QMJHL)
7	205	Tyler Soy	C	Canada	Victoria Royals (WHL)

=== Notes ===
Draft notes

- ^{[a]} The Pittsburgh Penguins' first-round pick went to the Anaheim Ducks as the result of a trade on June 20, 2016, that sent Frederik Andersen to Toronto in exchange for a second-round pick in 2017 and this pick.

Toronto previously acquired this pick from Pittsburgh as the result of a trade on July 1, 2015, that sent Phil Kessel, Tyler Biggs, Tim Erixon and a conditional second-round pick in 2016 to Pittsburgh in exchange for Nick Spaling, Kasperi Kapanen, Scott Harrington, New Jersey's third-round pick in 2016 and this pick (being conditional at the time of the trade). The condition – Toronto will receive a first-round pick in 2016 if Pittsburgh qualifies for the 2016 Stanley Cup playoffs – was converted on April 2, 2016.

- The Anaheim Ducks' second-round pick went to the Pittsburgh Penguins as the result of a trade on July 28, 2015, that sent Brandon Sutter and a conditional third-round pick in 2016 to Vancouver in exchange for Nick Bonino, Adam Clendening and this pick.

Vancouver previously acquired this pick as the result of a trade on June 30, 2015, that sent Kevin Bieksa to Anaheim in exchange for this pick.

- ^{[b]} The Edmonton Oilers' fourth-round pick went to the Anaheim Ducks as the result of a trade on February 29, 2016, that sent Patrick Maroon to Edmonton in exchange for Martin Gernat and this pick.
- The Anaheim Ducks' fifth-round pick went to the Washington Capitals as the result of a trade on February 28, 2016, that sent Brooks Laich, Connor Carrick and a second-round pick in 2016 to Toronto in exchange for Daniel Winnik and this pick.

Toronto previously acquired this pick as the result of a trade on March 2, 2015, that sent Korbinian Holzer to Anaheim in exchange for Eric Brewer and this pick.

- The Anaheim Ducks' sixth-round pick went to the Florida Panthers as the result of a trade on February 29, 2016, that sent Brandon Pirri to Anaheim in exchange for this pick.
