= 2016–17 Montreal Canadiens season =

NHL hockey team season

2016–17 Montreal Canadiens
- Atlantic Division champions
- Division: 1st Atlantic
- Conference: 4th Eastern
- 2016–17 record: 47–26–9
- Home record: 24–12–5
- Road record: 23–14–4
- Goals for: 226
- Goals against: 200

Team information
- General manager: Marc Bergevin
- Coach: Michel Therrien (Oct. 13 – Feb. 14); Claude Julien (interim, Feb. 14 – Apr. 22)
- Captain: Max Pacioretty
- Alternate captains: Brendan Gallagher; Andrei Markov; Tomas Plekanec; Shea Weber
- Arena: Bell Centre
- Average attendance: 21,288 (100.0%)
- Minor league affiliates: St. John's IceCaps (AHL); Brampton Beast (ECHL)

Team leaders
- Goals: Max Pacioretty (35)
- Assists: Alexander Radulov (36)
- Points: Max Pacioretty (67)
- Penalty minutes: Andrew Shaw (110)
- Plus/minus: Paul Byron (+21)
- Wins: Carey Price (37)
- Goals against average: Carey Price (2.23)

The 2016–17 Montreal Canadiens season was the 108th season for the franchise that was founded on December 4, 1909, and their 100th season in the National Hockey League (NHL).

== Standings ==
Atlantic Division
Pos	Team	GP	W	L	OTL	ROW	GF	GA	GD	Pts
1	y – Montreal Canadiens	82	47	26	9	44	226	200	+26	103
2	x – Ottawa Senators	82	44	28	10	38	212	214	−2	98
3	x – Boston Bruins	82	44	31	7	42	234	212	+22	95
4	x – Toronto Maple Leafs	82	40	27	15	39	251	242	+9	95
5	Tampa Bay Lightning	82	42	30	10	38	234	227	+7	94
6	Florida Panthers	82	35	36	11	30	210	237	−27	81
7	Detroit Red Wings	82	33	36	13	24	207	244	−37	79
8	Buffalo Sabres	82	33	37	12	31	201	237	−36	78

Source: National Hockey League
x – Clinched playoff spot; y – Clinched division

== Schedule and results ==
=== Pre-season ===
2016 Pre-season Game Log: 4–1–2 (Home: 3–1–1; Road: 1–0–1)
#	Date	Visitor	Score	Home	OT	Decision	Attendance	Record	Recap
1	September 26	New Jersey	3–2	Montreal		Lindgren	21,288	0–1–0	Recap
2	September 27	Washington	2–5	Montreal		Montoya	21,288	1–1–0	Recap
3	September 29	Ottawa	4–3	Montreal	OT	Condon	21,288	1–1–1	Recap
4	October 1	Montreal	3–2	Ottawa	OT	Montoya	17,147	2–1–1	Recap
5	October 2	Montreal	2–3	Toronto	OT	Condon	18,912	2–1–2	Recap
6	October 4	Boston	3–4	Montreal		–	–	3–1–2	Recap
7	October 6	Toronto	1–6	Montreal		Price	21,288	4–1–2	Recap

=== Regular season ===
2016–17 Game Log

October: 8–0–1 (Home: 5–0–0; Road: 3–0–1)
#	Date	Visitor	Score	Home	OT	Decision	Attendance	Record	Pts	Recap
1	October 13	Montreal	4–1	Buffalo		Montoya	19,070	1–0–0	2	Recap
2	October 15	Montreal	3–4	Ottawa	SO	Montoya	18,195	1–0–1	3	Recap
3	October 18	Pittsburgh	0–4	Montreal		Montoya	21,288	2–0–1	5	Recap
4	October 20	Arizona	2–5	Montreal		Price	21,288	3–0–1	7	Recap
5	October 22	Montreal	4–2	Boston		Price	17,565	4–0–1	9	Recap
6	October 24	Philadelphia	1–3	Montreal		Price	21,288	5–0–1	11	Recap
7	October 26	Montreal	3–2	NY Islanders		Montoya	12,194	6–0–1	13	Recap
8	October 27	Tampa Bay	1–3	Montreal		Price	21,288	7–0–1	15	Recap
9	October 29	Toronto	1–2	Montreal		Price	21,288	8–0–1	17	Recap

November: 8–5–1 (Home: 7–1–1; Road: 1–4–0)
#	Date	Visitor	Score	Home	OT	Decision	Attendance	Record	Pts	Recap
10	November 2	Vancouver	0–3	Montreal		Price	21,288	9–0–1	19	Recap
11	November 4	Montreal	0–10	Columbus		Montoya	14,436	9–1–1	19	Recap
12	November 5	Philadelphia	4–5	Montreal		Price	21,288	10–1–1	21	Recap
13	November 8	Boston	2–3	Montreal		Price	21,288	11–1–1	23	Recap
14	November 10	Los Angeles	1–4	Montreal		Price	21,288	12–1–1	25	Recap
15	November 12	Detroit	0–5	Montreal		Price	21,288	13–1–1	27	Recap
16	November 13	Montreal	2–3	Chicago		Montoya	21,762	13–2–1	27	Recap
17	November 15	Florida	4–3	Montreal	OT	Price	21,288	13–2–2	28	Recap
18	November 18	Montreal	2–3	Carolina		Montoya	12,101	13–3–2	28	Recap
19	November 19	Toronto	1–2	Montreal		Price	21,288	14–3–2	30	Recap
20	November 22	Ottawa	4–3	Montreal		Price	21,288	14–4–2	30	Recap
21	November 24	Carolina	1–2	Montreal		Price	21,288	15–4–2	32	Recap
22	November 26	Montreal	2–1	Detroit	OT	Price	20,027	16–4–2	34	Recap
23	November 29	Montreal	1–2	Anaheim		Price	14,830	16–5–2	34	Recap

December: 6–4–4 (Home: 3–2–1; Road: 3–2–3)
#	Date	Visitor	Score	Home	OT	Decision	Attendance	Record	Pts	Recap
24	December 2	Montreal	1–2	San Jose		Price	17,562	16–6–2	34	Recap
25	December 4	Montreal	5–4	Los Angeles	SO	Price	18,230	17–6–2	36	Recap
26	December 6	Montreal	2–3	St. Louis	OT	Montoya	17,646	17–6–3	37	Recap
27	December 8	New Jersey	2–5	Montreal		Price	21,288	18–6–3	39	Recap
28	December 10	Colorado	1–10	Montreal		Price	21,288	19–6–3	41	Recap
29	December 12	Boston	2–1	Montreal	OT	Price	21,288	19–6–4	42	Recap
30	December 16	San Jose	4–2	Montreal		Price	21,288	19–7–4	42	Recap
31	December 17	Montreal	2–1	Washington		Price	18,506	20–7–4	44	Recap
32	December 20	Anaheim	1–5	Montreal		Price	21,288	21–7–4	46	Recap
33	December 22	Minnesota	4–2	Montreal		Price	21,288	21–8–4	46	Recap
34	December 23	Montreal	1–2	Columbus		Montoya	18,147	21–9–4	46	Recap
35	December 28	Montreal	3–4	Tampa Bay	OT	Price	19,092	21–9–5	47	Recap
36	December 29	Montreal	3–2	Florida	OT	Montoya	17,489	22–9–5	49	Recap
37	December 31	Montreal	3–4	Pittsburgh	OT	Price	19,633	22–9–6	50	Recap

January: 8–5–1 (Home: 3–2–1; Road: 5–3–0)
#	Date	Visitor	Score	Home	OT	Decision	Attendance	Record	Pts	Recap
38	January 3	Montreal	2–1	Nashville	OT	Price	17,113	23–9–6	52	Recap
39	January 4	Montreal	4–3	Dallas	OT	Montoya	18,106	24–9–6	54	Recap
40	January 7	Montreal	5–3	Toronto		Price	19,796	25–9–6	56	Recap
41	January 9	Washington	4–1	Montreal		Price	21,288	25–10–6	56	Recap
42	January 11	Montreal	7–4	Winnipeg		Montoya	15,294	26–10–6	58	Recap
43	January 12	Montreal	1–7	Minnesota		Price	19,104	26–11–6	58	Recap
44	January 14	NY Rangers	4–5	Montreal		Price	21,288	27–11–6	60	Recap
45	January 16	Montreal	0–1	Detroit		Price	20,027	27–12–6	60	Recap
46	January 18	Pittsburgh	4–1	Montreal		Price	21,288	27–13–6	60	Recap
47	January 20	Montreal	3–1	New Jersey		Montoya	15,345	28–13–6	62	Recap
48	January 21	Buffalo	3–2	Montreal	OT	Price	21,288	28–13–7	63	Recap
49	January 24	Calgary	1–5	Montreal		Price	21,288	29–13–7	65	Recap
50	January 26	Montreal	1–3	NY Islanders		Price	12,019	29–14–7	65	Recap
January 27–29		All-Star Break in Los Angeles
51	January 31	Buffalo	2–5	Montreal		Price	21,288	30–14–7	67	Recap

February: 5–7–1 (Home: 1–4–1; Road: 4–3–0)
#	Date	Visitor	Score	Home	OT	Decision	Attendance	Record	Pts	Recap
52	February 2	Montreal	1–3	Philadelphia		Price	19,768	30–15–7	67	Recap
53	February 4	Washington	3–2	Montreal		Price	21,288	30–16–7	67	Recap
54	February 5	Edmonton	1–0	Montreal	SO	Montoya	21,288	30–16–8	68	Recap
55	February 7	Montreal	0–4	Colorado		Price	12,667	30–17–8	68	Recap
56	February 9	Montreal	5–4	Arizona	OT	Price	14,098	31–17–8	70	Recap
57	February 11	St. Louis	4–2	Montreal		Montoya	21,288	31–18–8	70	Recap
58	February 12	Montreal	0–4	Boston		Price	17,565	31–19–8	70	Recap
59	February 18	Winnipeg	3–1	Montreal		Price	21,288	31–20–8	70	Recap
60	February 21	Montreal	3–2	NY Rangers	SO	Price	18,006	32–20–8	72	Recap
61	February 23	NY Islanders	3–0	Montreal		Price	21,288	32–21–8	72	Recap
62	February 25	Montreal	3–2	Toronto	OT	Price	19,843	33–21–8	74	Recap
63	February 27	Montreal	4–3	New Jersey	OT	Montoya	13,270	34–21–8	76	Recap
64	February 28	Columbus	0–1	Montreal	OT	Price	21,288	35–21–8	78	Recap

March: 9–3–1 (Home: 5–2–1; Road: 4–1–0)
#	Date	Visitor	Score	Home	OT	Decision	Attendance	Record	Pts	Recap
65	March 2	Nashville	1–2	Montreal		Price	21,288	36–21–8	80	Recap
66	March 4	Montreal	4–1	NY Rangers		Price	18,006	37–21–8	82	Recap
67	March 7	Montreal	2–1	Vancouver	OT	Price	18,865	38–21–8	84	Recap
68	March 9	Montreal	0–5	Calgary		Montoya	19,289	38–22–8	84	Recap
69	March 12	Montreal	4–1	Edmonton		Price	18,347	39–22–8	86	Recap
70	March 14	Chicago	4–2	Montreal		Price	21,288	39–23–8	86	Recap
71	March 18	Montreal	4−3	Ottawa	SO	Price	19,653	40−23−8	88	Recap
72	March 19	Ottawa	1–4	Montreal		Price	21,288	41−23−8	90	Recap
73	March 21	Detroit	2–1	Montreal	OT	Montoya	21,288	41–23–9	91	Recap
74	March 23	Carolina	4–1	Montreal		Price	21,288	41–24–9	91	Recap
75	March 25	Ottawa	1–3	Montreal		Price	21,288	42–24–9	93	Recap
76	March 28	Dallas	1–4	Montreal		Price	21,288	43–24–9	95	Recap
77	March 30	Florida	2–6	Montreal		Price	21,288	44–24–9	97	Recap

April: 3–2–0 (Home: 0–1–0; Road: 3–1–0)
#	Date	Visitor	Score	Home	OT	Decision	Attendance	Record	Pts	Recap
78	April 1	Montreal	2–1	Tampa Bay	OT	Price	19,092	45–24–9	99	Recap
79	April 3	Montreal	4–1	Florida		Lindgren	15,222	46–24–9	101	Recap
80	April 5	Montreal	1–2	Buffalo		Price	18,815	46–25–9	101	Recap
81	April 7	Tampa Bay	4–2	Montreal		Price	21,288	46–26–9	101	Recap
82	April 8	Montreal	3–2	Detroit	OT	Lindgren	20,027	47–26–9	103	Recap

Legend: Win (2 points) Loss (0 points) Overtime/shootout loss (1 point)

=== Playoffs ===
2017 Stanley Cup playoffs

Eastern Conference First Round vs. (WC1) New York Rangers: New York wins 4–2
#	Date	Visitor	Score	Home	OT	Decision	Attendance	Series	Recap
1	April 12	NY Rangers	2–0	Montreal		Price	21,288	0–1	Recap
2	April 14	NY Rangers	3–4	Montreal	OT	Price	21,288	1–1	Recap
3	April 16	Montreal	3–1	NY Rangers		Price	18,006	2–1	Recap
4	April 18	Montreal	1–2	NY Rangers		Price	18,006	2–2	Recap
5	April 20	NY Rangers	3–2	Montreal	OT	Price	21,288	2–3	Recap
6	April 22	Montreal	1–3	NY Rangers		Price	18,006	2–4	Recap

Legend: Win Loss

== Player statistics ==
Final stats

=== Skaters ===
Regular season
Player	GP	G	A	Pts	+/−	PIM
Max Pacioretty	81	35	32	67	15	38
Alexander Radulov	76	18	36	54	10	62
Alex Galchenyuk	61	17	27	44	−5	24
Paul Byron	81	22	21	43	21	29
Shea Weber	78	17	25	42	20	38
Phillip Danault	82	13	27	40	5	35
Andrei Markov	62	6	30	36	18	16
Andrew Shaw	68	12	17	29	4	110
Brendan Gallagher	64	10	19	29	7	39
Artturi Lehkonen	73	18	10	28	−1	8
Tomas Plekanec	78	10	18	28	10	24
Jeff Petry	80	8	20	28	3	22
Nathan Beaulieu	74	4	24	28	8	44
Torrey Mitchell	78	8	9	17	5	38
Brian Flynn	51	6	4	10	2	4
David Desharnais^{‡}	31	4	6	10	5	6
Alexei Emelin	76	2	8	10	1	71
Daniel Carr	33	2	7	9	4	6
Sven Andrighetto^{‡}	27	2	6	8	1	4
Greg Pateryn^{‡}	24	1	5	6	1	4
Michael McCarron	31	1	4	5	−4	41
Nikita Nesterov^{†}	13	1	4	5	3	4
Zach Redmond	16	0	5	5	6	2
Chris Terry	14	2	2	4	−1	4
Mark Barberio^{‡}	26	0	4	4	1	10
Jordie Benn^{†}	13	2	0	2	−1	4
Brandon Davidson^{†}	10	0	2	2	−3	4
Charles Hudon	3	0	2	2	1	2
Dwight King^{†}	17	1	0	1	−2	2
Nikita Scherbak	3	1	0	1	1	0
Steve Ott^{†}	11	0	1	1	−2	17
Jacob de la Rose	9	0	0	0	−3	4
Bobby Farnham	3	0	0	0	0	17
Joel Hanley	7	0	0	0	−3	4
Ryan Johnston	7	0	0	0	−3	4
Brett Lernout	2	0	0	0	−1	0
Andreas Martinsen^{†}	9	0	0	0	−4	0
Mikhail Sergachev	4	0	0	0	1	0

Playoffs
Player	GP	G	A	Pts	+/−	PIM
Alexander Radulov	6	2	5	7	0	6
Artturi Lehkonen	6	2	2	4	−1	2
Brendan Gallagher	6	1	2	3	−3	8
Tomas Plekanec	6	1	2	3	−4	0
Shea Weber	6	1	2	3	1	5
Alex Galchenyuk	6	0	3	3	0	4
Phillip Danault	6	0	2	2	1	2
Paul Byron	6	1	0	1	−3	0
Alexei Emelin	2	1	0	1	1	2
Torrey Mitchell	3	1	0	1	1	0
Jeff Petry	6	1	0	1	−3	2
Nathan Beaulieu	5	0	1	1	−3	0
Andrei Markov	6	0	1	1	−1	10
Max Pacioretty	6	0	1	1	−2	7
Jordie Benn	6	0	0	0	−3	6
Brandon Davidson	3	0	0	0	−1	0
Brian Flynn	1	0	0	0	0	0
Dwight King	6	0	0	0	−1	0
Andreas Martinsen	2	0	0	0	−1	0
Michael McCarron	1	0	0	0	−1	0
Nikita Nesterov	2	0	0	0	−1	0
Steve Ott	6	0	0	0	0	0
Andrew Shaw	5	0	0	0	−2	7

=== Goaltenders ===
Regular season
Player	GP	GS	TOI	W	L	OT	GA	GAA	SA	SV%	SO	G	A	PIM
Carey Price	62	62	3,708:08	37	20	5	138	2.23	1794	.923	3	0	1	4
Al Montoya	19	18	1124:53	8	6	4	50	2.67	569	.912	2	0	2	2
Charlie Lindgren	2	2	121:42	2	0	0	3	1.48	59	.949	0	0	0	0

Playoffs
Player	GP	GS	TOI	W	L	GA	GAA	SA	SV%	SO	G	A	PIM
Carey Price	6	6	387:28	2	4	12	1.86	179	.933	0	0	0	0

^{†}Denotes player spent time with another team before joining Canadiens. Stats reflect time with Canadiens only.
^{‡}Traded mid-season. Stats reflect time with Canadiens only.

== Suspensions/fines ==
Player	Explanation	Length	Salary	Date issued	Ref
Andrew Shaw	Boarding Capitals defenceman Connor Hobbs	3 games (all pre-season)	N/A	September 29, 2016	

== Awards and honours ==
=== Awards ===
Regular season
Player	Award	Awarded	Ref
Shea Weber	NHL Third Star of the Week	October 31, 2016	
Shea Weber	NHL Second Star of the Month	November 1, 2016	
Carey Price	NHL Third Star of the Week	March 6, 2017	

=== Milestones ===
Regular season
Player	Milestone	Reached	Ref
Mikhail Sergachev	1st Career NHL Game	October 13, 2016	
Artturi Lehkonen	1st Career NHL Game	October 13, 2016	
Artturi Lehkonen	1st Career NHL Goal; 1st Career NHL Point	October 15, 2016	
Jeff Petry	100th Career NHL Point	October 18, 2016	
Artturi Lehkonen	1st Career NHL Assist	October 24, 2016	
Alex Galchenyuk	100th Career NHL Assist	November 15, 2016	
Max Pacioretty	500th Career NHL Game	November 19, 2016	
Alex Galchenyuk	300th Career NHL Game	December 4, 2016	
Jeff Petry	400th Career NHL Game	December 29, 2016	
Shea Weber	800th Career NHL Game	December 31, 2016	
Nikita Scherbak	1st Career NHL Game; 1st Career NHL Goal; 1st Career NHL Point	January 7, 2017	
Phillip Danault	100th Career NHL Game	January 20, 2017	
Alexander Radulov	200th Career NHL Game	January 21, 2017	
Nathan Beaulieu	200th Career NHL Game	February 7, 2017	
Max Pacioretty	200th Career NHL Goal	February 9, 2017	
Tomas Plekanec	900th Career NHL Game	February 11, 2017	
Brendan Gallagher	300th Career NHL Game	February 12, 2017	
Max Pacioretty	400th Career NHL Point	February 28, 2017	
Shea Weber	300th Career NHL Assist	February 28, 2017	
Paul Byron	100th Career NHL Point	March 12, 2017	
Alex Galchenyuk	200th Career NHL Point	March 14, 2017	
Carey Price	500th Career NHL Game	March 14, 2017	
Torrey Mitchell	600th Career NHL Game	March 19, 2017	
Max Pacioretty	200th Career NHL Assist	April 1, 2017	
Brandon Davidson	100th Career NHL Game	April 7, 2017	

Playoffs
Player	Milestone	Reached	Ref
Artturi Lehkonen	1st Career Playoff Game	April 12, 2017	
Phillip Danault	1st Career Playoff Game	April 12, 2017	
Paul Byron	1st Career Playoff Game	April 12, 2017	
Andreas Martinsen	1st Career Playoff Game	April 12, 2017	
Paul Byron	1st Career Playoff Goal; 1st Career Playoff Point	April 14, 2017	
Phillip Danault	1st Career Playoff Assist; 1st Career Playoff Point	April 14, 2017	
Brandon Davidson	1st Career Playoff Game	April 16, 2017	
Artturi Lehkonen	1st Career Playoff Goal; 1st Career Playoff Point	April 16, 2017	
Artturi Lehkonen	1st Career Playoff Assist	April 20, 2017	
Alexei Emelin	1st Career Playoff Goal	April 22, 2017	
Michael McCarron	1st Career Playoff Game	April 22, 2017	

== Transactions ==
The Canadiens have been involved in the following transactions during the 2016–17 season:

=== Trades ===
Date	Details		Ref
June 24, 2016	To Washington Capitals Lars Eller	To Montreal Canadiens 2nd-round pick in 2017; 2nd-round pick in 2018	
June 24, 2016	To Chicago Blackhawks 2nd-round pick in 2016; MIN's 2nd-round pick in 2016	To Montreal Canadiens Andrew Shaw	
June 25, 2016	To Winnipeg Jets 7th-round pick in 2017	To Montreal Canadiens 7th-round pick in 2016	
June 29, 2016	To Nashville Predators P. K. Subban	To Montreal Canadiens Shea Weber	
October 8, 2016	To Florida Panthers Tim Bozon	To Montreal Canadiens Jonathan Racine	
January 26, 2017	To Tampa Bay Lightning Jonathan Racine; 6th-round pick in 2017	To Montreal Canadiens Nikita Nesterov	
February 21, 2017	To Carolina Hurricanes Philip Samuelsson	To Montreal Canadiens Keegan Lowe	
February 27, 2017	To Dallas Stars Greg Pateryn; 4th-round pick in 2017	To Montreal Canadiens Jordie Benn	
February 28, 2017	To Edmonton Oilers David Desharnais	To Montreal Canadiens Brandon Davidson	
March 1, 2017	To Detroit Red Wings 6th-round pick in 2018	To Montreal Canadiens Steve Ott	
March 1, 2017	To Los Angeles Kings Conditional 4th-round pick in 2018	To Montreal Canadiens Dwight King	
March 1, 2017	To Colorado Avalanche Sven Andrighetto	To Montreal Canadiens Andreas Martinsen	
June 15, 2017	To Tampa Bay Lightning Mikhail Sergachev; Conditional 2nd-round pick in 2018	To Montreal Canadiens Jonathan Drouin; Conditional 6th-round pick in 2018	
June 17, 2017	To Buffalo Sabres Nathan Beaulieu	To Montreal Canadiens 3rd-round pick in 2017	

=== Free agents acquired ===
Date	Player	Former team	Contract terms (in U.S. dollars)	Ref
July 1, 2016	Al Montoya	Florida Panthers	1 year, $950,000	
July 1, 2016	Alexander Radulov	CSKA Moscow	1 year, $5.75 million	
July 1, 2016	Zach Redmond	Colorado Avalanche	2 years, $1.225 million	
July 2, 2016	Philip Samuelsson	Springfield Falcons	1 year, $600,000 two-way contract	
July 2, 2016	Chris Terry	Carolina Hurricanes	1 year, $600,000 two-way contract	
July 22, 2016	Bobby Farnham	New Jersey Devils	1 year, $575,000 two-way contract	
January 7, 2017	Markus Eisenschmid	St. John's IceCaps	2 years, $1.285 million entry-level contract	
April 27, 2017	Antoine Waked	Rouyn-Noranda Huskies	3 years, $2.18 million entry-level contract	
May 1, 2017	Jakub Jerabek	Vityaz Podolsk	1 year, $925,000 entry-level contract	

=== Free agents lost ===
Date	Player	New team	Contract terms (in U.S. dollars)	Ref
May 25, 2016	Bud Holloway	CSKA Moscow	2 years	
July 1, 2016	Michael Bournival	Tampa Bay Lightning	1 year, $575,000 two-way contract	
July 1, 2016	Tom Gilbert	Los Angeles Kings	1 year, $1.4 million	
July 1, 2016	Gabriel Dumont	Tampa Bay Lightning	1 year, $575,000 two-way contract	
July 1, 2016	Darren Dietz	Washington Capitals	1 year, $575,000 two-way contract	
July 1, 2016	Victor Bartley	Minnesota Wild	1 year, $650,000 two-way contract	
July 1, 2016	Morgan Ellis	St. Louis Blues	1 year, $575,000 two-way contract	
July 1, 2016	Ben Scrivens	Dinamo Minsk	1 year	
July 2, 2016	Mac Bennett	Rochester Americans	1 year	
July 22, 2016	Stefan Fournier	Arizona Coyotes	1 year, $632,500 two-way contract	
October 17, 2016	Lucas Lessio	KHL Medveščak Zagreb	1 year	
May 4, 2017	Max Friberg	Frölunda HC	3 years	

=== Lost via waivers ===
Player	New team	Date	Ref
Mike Condon	Pittsburgh Penguins	October 11, 2016	
Mark Barberio	Colorado Avalanche	February 2, 2017	

=== Player signings ===
Date	Player	Contract terms (in U.S. dollars)	Ref
June 27, 2016	Andrew Shaw	6 years, $23.4 million	
July 1, 2016	Mikhail Sergachev	3 years, $2.775 million entry-level contract	
July 1, 2016	Daniel Carr	2 years, $1.45 million contract extension	
July 5, 2016	Phillip Danault	2 years, $1.824 million contract extension	
January 2, 2017	Al Montoya	2 years, $1.065 million contract extension	
March 3, 2017	Chris Terry	1 year, $650,000 contract extension	
March 9, 2017	Simon Bourque	3 years, $2.16 million entry-level contract	
March 24, 2017	Jeremiah Addison	3 years, $2.16 million entry-level contract	
March 27, 2017	Victor Mete	3 years, $2.244 million entry-level contract	
June 5, 2017	Andreas Martinsen	1 year, $675,000 contract extension	
June 15, 2017	Charles Hudon	2 years, $1.3 million contract extension	
June 15, 2017	Jonathan Drouin	6 years, $33 million contract extension	

== Draft picks ==
Below are the Montreal Canadiens' selections at the 2016 NHL entry draft, held on June 24–25, 2016 at the First Niagara Center in Buffalo, New York.

Round	#	Player	Pos	Nationality	College/Junior/Club team (League)
1	9	Mikhail Sergachev	Defence	Russia	Windsor Spitfires (OHL)
3	70	William Bitten	Centre	Canada	Flint Firebirds (OHL)
4	100	Victor Mete	Defence	Canada	London Knights (OHL)
5	124^{[a]}	Casey Staum	Defence	United States	Hill-Murray Pioneers (MSHSL)
6	160	Michael Pezzetta	Centre	Canada	Sudbury Wolves (OHL)
7	187^{[b]}	Arvid Henrikson	Defence	Sweden	AIK Jrs. (Sweden)

=== Notes ===
- The Canadiens' second-round pick went to the Chicago Blackhawks as the result of a trade on June 24, 2016, that sent Andrew Shaw to Montreal in exchange for Minnesota's second-round pick in 2016 (45th overall) and this pick.
- ^{[a]} The Vancouver Canucks' fifth-round pick went to the Canadiens as the result of a trade on July 1, 2015, that sent Brandon Prust to Vancouver in exchange for Zack Kassian and this pick. The Canadiens' own fifth-round pick had previously gone to the Buffalo Sabres as the result of a trade on March 2, 2015 that sent Brian Flynn to Montreal in exchange for this pick.
- ^{[b]} The Winnipeg Jets' seventh-round pick went to the Canadiens as the result of a trade on June 25, 2016, that sent a seventh-round pick in 2017 to Winnipeg in exchange for this pick. The Canadiens' own seventh-round pick had previously gone to the Buffalo Sabres as the result of a trade on March 2, 2015 that sent Torrey Mitchell to Montreal in exchange for Jack Nevins and this pick.
