= Reece Scarlett =

Canadian ice hockey player

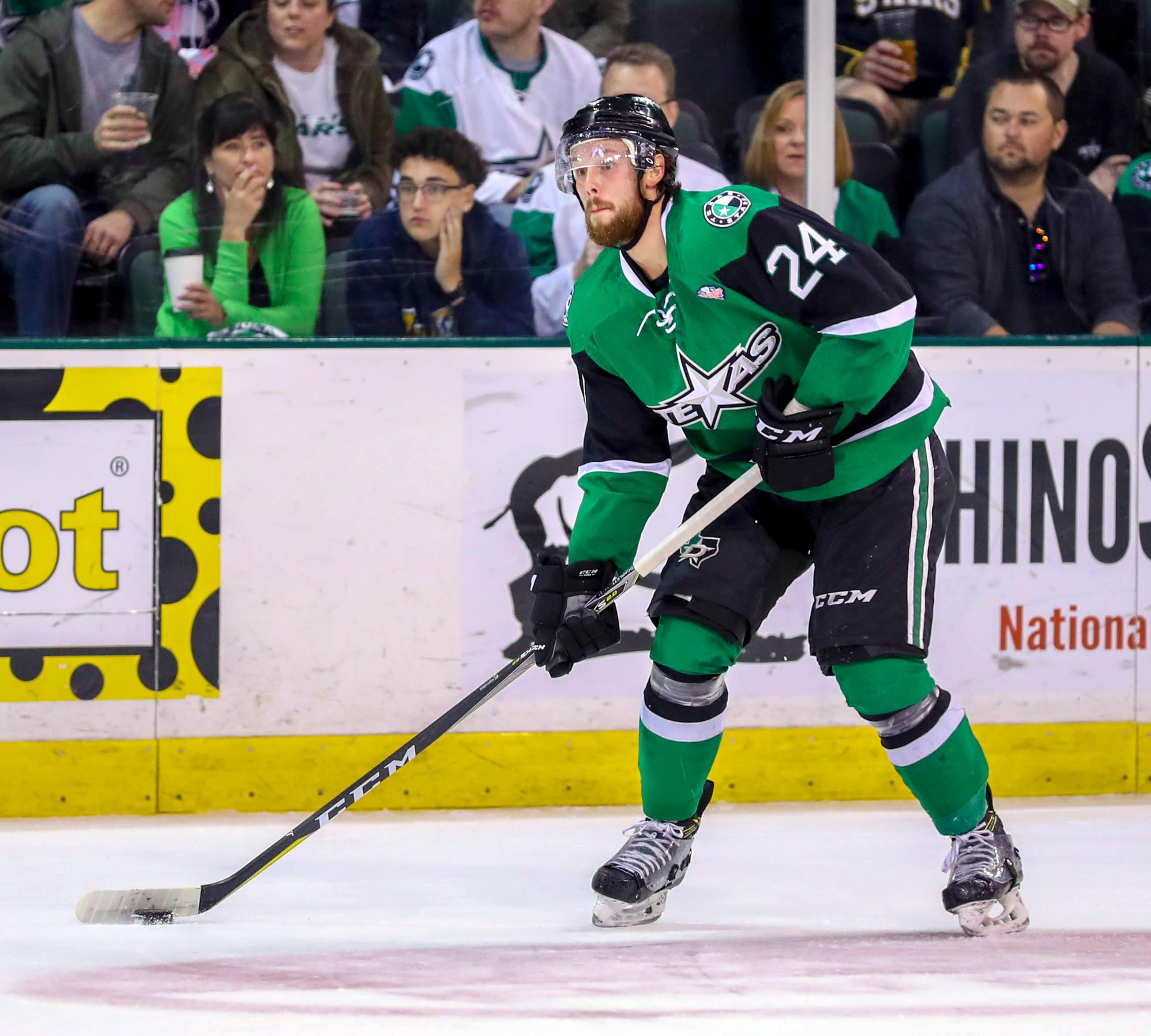
- Born: March 31, 1993 (age 33) Sherwood Park, Alberta, Canada
- Height: 6 ft 1 in (185 cm)
- Weight: 185 lb (84 kg; 13 st 3 lb)
- Position: Defence
- Shoots: Right
- Liiga team Former teams: Vaasan Sport; Albany Devils; Springfield Thunderbirds; Texas Stars; Dinamo Riga; Löwen Frankfurt
- NHL draft: 159th overall, 2011; New Jersey Devils
- Playing career: 2013–present

Reece Scarlett (born March 31, 1993) is a Canadian professional ice hockey defenceman who is currently playing under contract with Vaasan Sport of the Liiga. He was originally drafted by the New Jersey Devils, 159th overall, in the 2011 NHL entry draft.

== Playing career ==
Scarlett played midget hockey with his hometown club, the Sherwood Park Kings, in the Alberta Midget Hockey League after his talent was noticed to be originally selected 12th overall by the Swift Current Broncos in the 2008 WHL Bantam Draft. Scarlett was later signed by the Broncos and embarked on a major junior career in the Western Hockey League from the tail end of the 2008–09 season.

After his second full season with the Broncos and having participated in the CHL Top Prospects Game, Scarlett was drafted in the sixth round, 159th overall, by the New Jersey Devils in the 2011 NHL entry draft.

Approaching his final junior season with Swift Current in 2012–13, Scarlett was signed to a three-year, entry-level contract with the New Jersey Devils on September 7, 2012. He matched his previous season totals with the Broncos in collecting 9 goals and 40 assists for 49 points in 67 games.

Scarlett played the duration of his rookie contract within the Devils organization with AHL affiliate, the Albany Devils. As a restricted free agent, he was signed to a one-year contract extension with New Jersey on July 18, 2016. He was assigned to continue his tenure with the Albany Devils to begin the 2016–17 season. Having played over 200 games with Albany, placing fourth in all-time assists, Scarlett faced limited prospects of a recall to the NHL with New Jersey. At the trade deadline on March 1, 2017, Scarlett was traded by the Devils to the Florida Panthers in exchange for Shane Harper. He was to continue in the AHL, assigned to the Springfield Thunderbirds and scored a goal in his debut before suffering a season-ending injury later in the game.

On July 1, 2017, Scarlett agreed to a one-year, two-way contract to remain with the Florida Panthers. After participating in his first training camp with the Panthers, Scarlett was familiarly re-assigned to the AHL on September 25, 2017. With the Thunderbirds struggling at the start of the 2017–18 season, and having contributed with 2 points in 13 games, Scarlett was traded by the Panthers to the Dallas Stars in exchange for Ludvig Bystrom on November 10, 2017.

Having played seven seasons in the AHL and unable to break through to the NHL, Scarlett left North America as a free agent to join Latvian club, Dinamo Riga of the Kontinental Hockey League, on a one-year contract on August 23, 2020.

Moving to the Deutsche Eishockey Liga for the 2022–23 season, Scarlett joined Löwen Frankfurt in their first season in the top tier and recorded 5 goals and 21 points through 38 regular season games on the blueline. Following their defeat in the playoff qualifiers to Düsseldorfer EG, Scarlett left Frankfurt at the conclusion of his contract on March 19, 2023.

On June 23, 2023, Scarlett continued his career abroad by agreeing to a one-year contract with Finnish club, Vaasan Sport of the Liiga.

== Career statistics ==
=== Regular season and playoffs ===
			Regular season					Playoffs
Season	Team	League	GP	G	A	Pts	PIM	GP	G	A	Pts	PIM
2008–09	Sherwood Park Kings	AMHL	34	4	13	17	60	11	2	6	8	4
2008–09	Swift Current Broncos	WHL	1	0	0	0	0	—	—	—	—	—
2009–10	Swift Current Broncos	WHL	65	1	9	10	49	4	0	2	2	4
2010–11	Swift Current Broncos	WHL	72	6	18	24	59	—	—	—	—	—
2011–12	Swift Current Broncos	WHL	71	9	40	49	74	—	—	—	—	—
2012–13	Swift Current Broncos	WHL	67	9	40	49	66	5	0	3	3	10
2013–14	Albany Devils	AHL	48	6	14	20	18	—	—	—	—	—
2014–15	Albany Devils	AHL	57	2	23	25	27	—	—	—	—	—
2015–16	Albany Devils	AHL	60	4	22	26	64	10	0	0	0	0
2016–17	Albany Devils	AHL	50	4	17	21	53	—	—	—	—	—
2016–17	Springfield Thunderbirds	AHL	1	1	0	1	0	—	—	—	—	—
2017–18	Springfield Thunderbirds	AHL	13	1	1	2	22	—	—	—	—	—
2017–18	Texas Stars	AHL	44	1	6	7	46	22	0	3	3	6
2018–19	Texas Stars	AHL	1	0	0	0	2	—	—	—	—	—
2019–20	Texas Stars	AHL	51	5	11	16	24	—	—	—	—	—
2020–21	Dinamo Riga	KHL	47	2	15	17	18	—	—	—	—	—
2021–22	Dinamo Riga	KHL	32	4	3	7	16	—	—	—	—	—
2022–23	Löwen Frankfurt	DEL	38	5	16	21	19	2	0	1	1	4
AHL totals			325	24	94	118	256	32	0	3	3	6

=== International ===
Year	Team	Event	Result	GP	G	A	Pts	PIM
2010	Canada Pacific	U17	5th	5	2	4	6	4
2011	Canada	U18	4th	7	0	0	0	0
Junior totals				12	2	4	6	4

== Awards and honours ==
Award	Year
WHL
CHL Top Prospects Game	2011
International
U17 All-Star Team	2010
