= 2016 Hockey East men's ice hockey tournament =

2016 Hockey East Men's ice hockey tournament
- Dates: March 3–19, 2016
- Teams: 12
- Finals site: TD Garden; Boston
- Champions: Northeastern (2nd title)
- Winning coach: Jim Madigan (1st title)
- MVP: Kevin Boyle (UMass Lowell)
- Hockey East Men's Ice Hockey Tournaments

The 2016 Hockey East Men's Ice Hockey Tournament was the 32nd tournament in the history of the conference. It was played between March 3 and March 19, 2016 at campus locations and at the TD Garden in Boston, Massachusetts. The Northeastern Huskies defeated the UMass Lowell River Hawks by a score of 3–2 to earn their 2nd Hockey East championship in school history and earn Hockey East's automatic bid into the 2016 NCAA Division I Men's Ice Hockey Tournament. Kevin Boyle was named tournament MVP.

== Format ==
The tournament will include all twelve teams in the conference. Seeds 1–4 earned a first-round bye, and seeds 5–12 played a best-of-three Opening Round played on campus locations. Winners advanced to play the 1–4 seeds in the best-of-three Quarterfinals on campus locations. Winners of those series played in a single-game Semifinal, and those winners faced off in a single-game Championship Final, both at the TD Garden.

=== Regular season standings ===
Note: GP = Games played; W = Wins; L = Losses; T = Ties; PTS = Points; GF = Goals For; GA = Goals Against

2015–16 Hockey East men's standings
	Conference record							Overall record					
	GP	W	L	T	PTS	GF	GA	GP	W	L	T	GF	GA
#5 Boston College †	22	15	2	5	35	91	45	41	28	8	5	156	82
#3 Providence †	22	16	3	3	35	71	39	38	27	7	4	124	71
#13 Notre Dame	22	15	5	2	32	70	40	37	19	11	7	115	86
#8 Massachusetts–Lowell	22	12	6	4	28	58	37	40	25	10	5	121	75
#11 Boston University	22	12	6	4	28	75	56	36	21	10	5	124	106
#14 Northeastern *	22	10	8	4	24	75	56	41	22	14	5	134	105
Merrimack	22	5	10	7	17	50	70	39	13	19	7	95	108
Connecticut	22	6	12	4	16	49	70	36	11	21	4	88	114
Vermont	22	6	13	3	15	48	66	40	15	22	3	86	107
New Hampshire	22	4	12	6	14	57	73	37	11	20	6	112	121
Maine	22	5	15	2	12	42	77	38	8	24	6	76	129
Massachusetts	22	2	16	4	8	44	101	36	8	24	4	84	146
Championship: March 19, 2016 † indicates conference regular season champion; * indicates conference tournament champion Rankings: USCHO.com Top 20 Poll; updated March 8, 2016

== Bracket ==
Teams are reseeded after the Opening Round and Quarterfinals

Opening Round; March 3–6
5	Boston University	2*	5	—
12	Massachusetts	1	4	—
6	Northeastern	3*	4*	—
11	Maine	2	3	—
7	Merrimack	1	3*	2
10	New Hampshire	3	2	1
8	Connecticut	1	3	—
9	Vermont	2	4	—

Quarterfinals; March 11–13
1	Boston College	3	2	4*
9	Vermont	0	4	3
2	Providence	3	2	—
7	Merrimack	1	0	—
3	Notre Dame	1	4	—
6	Northeastern	3	6	—
4	Massachusetts–Lowell	3	5	—
5	Boston University	2	0	—

Semifinals; March 18
1	Boston College	4
6	Northeastern	5
2	Providence	1
4	Massachusetts–Lowell	2***

Championship; March 19
6	Northeastern	3
4	Massachusetts–Lowell	2

Note: * denotes overtime period(s)

== Results ==
=== Opening Round ===
==== (5) Boston University vs. (12) Massachusetts ====
March 4	Boston University	2 - 1	OT	Massachusetts	Agganis Arena	Recap
No Scoring		First period		08:07 - Steven Iacobellis (Walsh, Pigozzi)
(Lane, Oksanen) Bobo Carpenter - 03:52		Second period		No scoring
No scoring		Third period		No scoring
(Oksanen, Fortunato) Bobo Carpenter - GW - 09:34		First overtime period		No scoring
( 28 saves / 29 shots ) Sean Maguire		Goalie stats		Nic Renyard ( 46 saves / 48 shots )

March 5	Boston University	5 - 4	Massachusetts	Agganis Arena	Recap
(O'Regan, Greenway) Jakob Forsbacka Karlsson - 05:40		First period	10:07 - Dennis Kravchenko (Plevy, Widmar)
(Grzelcyk, McAvoy) Danny O'Regan - PP - 05:53 (McAvoy, Lane) Matt Grzelcyk - 12:39 (Greenway, McAvoy) Danny O'Regan - 18:45		Second period	11:13 - Shane Walsh (Iacobellis, Kravchenko); 17:50 - PP - Kurt Keats (Plevy, Pigozzi)
(McAvoy, O'Regan) Jakob Forsbacka Karlsson - GW - 11:51		Third period	03:51 - Austin Plevy (Fryer, Keats)
( 32 saves / 36 shots ) Sean Maguire		Goalie stats	Nic Renyard ( 38 saves / 43 shots )

Boston University won series 2–0

==== (6) Northeastern vs. (11) Maine ====
March 4	Northeastern	3 - 2	OT	Maine	Matthews Arena	Recap
No Scoring		First period		17:51 - PP - Cameron Brown (Renouf, Byron); 18:08 - Andrew Tegeler (Vesey, Hamilton)
(Aston-Reese, N. Stevens) John Stevens - 14:39		Second period		No scoring
(N. Stevens, Gaudette) Kevin Roy - PP - 02:54		Third period		No scoring
(Aston-Reese, J. Stevens) Matt Benning - GW - 04:41		First overtime period		No scoring
( 19 saves / 21 shots ) Ryan Ruck		Goalie stats		Rob McGovern ( 29 saves / 32 shots )

March 5	Northeastern	4 - 3	OT	Maine	Matthews Arena	Recap
(Roy, Collier) Eric Williams - 14:51 (Cockerill, Aston-Reese) Nolan Stevens - 16:09 (Kurker) Kevin Roy - 16:57		First period		No scoring
No scoring		Second period		11:44 - PP - Cameron Brown (Merchant, Byron)
No scoring		Third period		04:40 - Cédric Lacroix (Tegeler, Vesey); 08:29 - Keith Muehlbauer (Robbins, Perez)
(unassisted) Kevin Roy - GW - 13:45		First overtime period		No scoring
( 33 saves / 36 shots ) Ryan Ruck		Goalie stats		Rob McGovern ( 26 saves / 30 shots )

Northeastern won series 2–0

==== (7) Merrimack vs. (10) New Hampshire ====
March 3	Merrimack	1 - 3	New Hampshire	J. Thom Lawler Rink	Recap
No Scoring		First period	No scoring
No scoring		Second period	14:45 - Tyler Kelleher (Poturalski, Correale)
(LeBlanc, Titcomb) Derek Petti - 12:02		Third period	04:10 - GW - Marcus Vela (Gaudreault, Cleland); 19:47 - EN - Marcus Vela (Cleland, Gaudreault)
( 25 saves / 27 shots ) Drew Vogler		Goalie stats	Daniel Tirone ( 45 saves / 46 shots )

March 4	Merrimack	3 - 2	OT	New Hampshire	J. Thom Lawler Rink	Recap
(Wyszomirski, Kolquist) Derek Petti - 04:35		First period		14:16 - Tyler Kelleher (Poturalski, Boyd); 16:49 - PP - Matias Cleland (Correale, Kelleher)
(Gustafsson, Christie) Ben Bahe - 07:59		Second period		No scoring
No scoring		Third period		No scoring
(LeBlanc, Biega) Ludvig Larsson - GW - 12:02		First overtime period		No scoring
( 21 saves / 23 shots ) Drew Vogler		Goalie stats		Daniel Tirone ( 47 saves / 50 shots )

March 6	Merrimack	2 - 1	New Hampshire	J. Thom Lawler Rink	Recap
No Scoring		First period	No scoring
(Biega, Larsson) Derek Petti - 08:01 (Biega) Jace Hennig - GW - 18:34		Second period	No scoring
No scoring		Third period	10:34 - PP - Matt Dawson (Nazarian, Smith)
( 27 saves / 28 shots ) Drew Vogler		Goalie stats	Daniel Tirone ( 40 saves / 42 shots )

Merrimack won series 2–1

==== (8) Connecticut vs. (9) Vermont ====
March 4	Connecticut	1 - 2	Vermont	XL Center	Recap
(Schwartz) Spencer Naas - 13:45		First period	01:28 - Alexx Privitera (Phillips, Puffer)
No scoring		Second period	01:28 - GW - Rob Darrar (Irwin)
No scoring		Third period	No scoring
( 34 saves / 36 shots ) Robert Nichols		Goalie stats	Mike Santaguida ( 32 saves / 33 shots )

March 5	Connecticut	3 - 4	Vermont	XL Center	Recap
(Ferriss) Karl El-Mir - 08:42		First period	12:12 - PP - Mario Puskarich (Bradley); 01:28 - Conor O'Neil (Puffer)
(Ferriss, Kalter) Karl El-Mir - 02:18 (Letunov, Masonius) Tage Thompson - 07:35		Second period	No scoring
No scoring		Third period	09:45 - PP - Yvan Pattyn (Blanleil, Petruzzelli); 18:41 - Brian Bowen (Darrar)
( 28 saves / 32 shots ) Robert Nichols		Goalie stats	Mike Santaguida ( 24 saves / 27 shots )

Vermont won series 2–0

=== Quarterfinals ===
==== (1) Boston College vs. (9) Vermont ====
March 11	Boston College	3 - 0	Vermont	Conte Forum	Recap
(Cangelosi, Wood) Adam Gilmour - GW - 04:14 (Gilmour) Austin Cangelosi - 10:58		First period	No scoring
(Cangelosi, Gilmour) Ryan Fitzgerald - 03:20		Second period	No scoring
No scoring		Third period	No scoring
( 36 saves / 36 shots ) Thatcher Demko		Goalie stats	Mike Santaguida ( 14 saves / 17 shots ) / Packy Munson ( 13 saves / 13 shots )

March 12	Boston College	2 - 4	Vermont	Conte Forum	Recap
(Wood, Savage) Austin Cangelosi - PP - 03:49 (Kim, Gilmour) Alex Tuch - 07:05		First period	No scoring
No scoring		Second period	02:50 - Brian Bowen (Hamilton, Coughlin); 10:20 - Liam Coughlin (Hamilton)
No scoring		Third period	11:20 - GW - Brendan Bradley (Puskarich, Privitera); 19:59 - EN - Rob Darrar (Coughlin, Bowen)
( 27 saves / 30 shots ) Thatcher Demko		Goalie stats	Packy Munson ( 43 saves / 45 shots )

March 13	Boston College	4 - 3	OT	Vermont	Conte Forum	Recap
(Gilmour, Tuch) Zach Sanford - 04:02		First period		08:51 - Craig Puffer (Hamilton, Shaw)
(Dudek, Santini) Colin White - 01:56		Second period		16:28 - Conor O'Neil (Puffer, Shaw)
(C. Fitzgerald, R. Fitzgerald) JD Dudek - 10:30		Third period		04:37 - Conor O'Neil (Shaw, Pattyn)
(Gilmour, C. Fitzgerald) Ryan Fitzgerald - GW - 09:47		First overtime period		No scoring
( 36 saves / 39 shots ) Thatcher Demko		Goalie stats		Packy Munson ( 31 saves / 35 shots )

Boston College won series 2–1

==== (2) Providence vs. (7) Merrimack ====
March 11	Providence	3 - 1	Merrimack	Schneider Arena	Recap
(Tanev, Monk) Nick Saracino - 10:23		First period	No scoring
No scoring		Second period	No scoring
(Jankowski, Parisi) Erik Foley - GW - 13:10 (Jankowski, Parisi) Trevor Mingoia - EN - 18:57		Third period	03:06 - Craig Wyszomirski (Christie)
( 25 saves / 26 shots ) Nick Ellis		Goalie stats	Drew Vogler ( 27 saves / 29 shots )

March 12	Providence	2 - 0	Merrimack	Schneider Arena	Recap
No Scoring		First period	No scoring
No scoring		Second period	No scoring
(McKenzie) Garrett Gamez - GW - 10:39 (Tanev, Monk) Kevin Rooney - EN - 19:21		Third period	No scoring
( 20 saves / 20 shots ) Nick Ellis		Goalie stats	Drew Vogler ( 32 saves / 33 shots )

Providence won series 2–0

==== (3) Notre Dame vs. (6) Northeastern ====
March 11	Notre Dame	1 - 3	Northeastern	Compton Family Ice Arena	Recap
(Nardella, Lucia) Jordan Gross - 07:35		First period	02:29 - Lincoln Griffin (Schule); 06:24 - GW - John Stevens (N. Stevens, Aston-Reese)
No scoring		Second period	No scoring
No scoring		Third period	19:25 - EN - Tanner Pond (Gaudette)
( 19 saves / 21 shots ) Cal Petersen		Goalie stats	Ryan Ruck ( 20 saves / 21 shots )

March 12	Notre Dame	4 - 6	Northeastern	Compton Family Ice Arena	Recap
(Hurley) Luke Ripley - 14:38		First period	18:50 - PP - Colton Saucerman (Cockerill, Roy)
(Bjork, Evans) Mario Lucia - 19:55		Second period	02:26 - Kevin Roy (Kurker); 03:33 - Garret Cockerill (J. Stevens, Aston-Reese); 05:46 - PP - Dylan Sikura (Saucerman, Roy)
(Wade, Hurley) Thomas Di Pauli - 16:33 (Di Pauli) Mario Lucia - PP - 19:38		Third period	18:39 - GW - Kevin Roy (Saucerman, McMurtry); 12:31 - Tanner Pond (Sikura, McMurtry)
( 28 saves / 34 shots ) Cal Petersen / ( 0 saves / 0 shots ) Nick Stasack		Goalie stats	Ryan Ruck ( 25 saves / 29 shots )

Northeastern won series 2–0

==== (4) Massachusetts–Lowell vs. (5) Boston University ====
March 11	Massachusetts–Lowell	3 - 2	Boston University	Tsongas Center	Recap
No Scoring		First period	No scoring
(Smith, Panico) Joe Gambardella - PP - 08:58		Second period	06:22 - Jakob Forsbacka Karlsson (O'Regan, Fortunato)
(White, Fallon) Michael Louria - 11:35 (Smith, Panico) Adam Chapie - GW PP - 15:22		Third period	15:45 - Bobo Carpenter (Grzelcyk, McAvoy)
( 33 saves / 35 shots ) Kevin Boyle		Goalie stats	Sean Maguire ( 16 saves / 19 shots )

March 12	Massachusetts–Lowell	5 - 0	Boston University	Tsongas Center	Recap
(Chapie, Master) Jake Kamrass - GW - 03:07		First period	No scoring
(Kamrass, Chapie) Joe Gambardella - 06:26 (Edwardh, Kapla) C. J. Smith - 10:50		Second period	No scoring
(Master, Forney) C. J. Smith - 05:38 (Gambardella) John Edwardh - 08:30		Third period	No scoring
( 24 saves / 24 shots ) Kevin Boyle		Goalie stats	Sean Maguire ( 13 saves / 15 shots ) / Connor LaCouvee ( 14 saves / 17 shots )

Massachusetts–Lowell won series 2–0

=== Semifinals ===
==== (1) Boston College vs. (6) Northeastern ====
March 18	Boston College	4 - 5	Northeastern	TD Garden	Recap
(Brown, Santini) Miles Wood - 00:15		First period	14:08 - Zach Aston-Reese (N. Stevens, Cockerill); 19:59 - Adam Gaudette (McMurtry, Sikura)
(Gaudreau, McCoshen) Colin White - 01:10 (R. Fitzgerald, Doherty) Miles Wood - PP - 13:54		Second period	02:55 - PP - Nolan Stevens (J. Stevens, Gaudette); 10:55 - PP - Eric Williams (Roy, Sikura)
(Sanford, Santini) Alex Tuch - 10:50		Third period	09:44 - GW - Lincoln Griffin (unassisted)
( 27 saves / 32 shots ) Thatcher Demko		Goalie stats	Ryan Ruck ( 21 saves / 25 shots )

==== (2) Providence vs. (4) Massachusetts–Lowell ====
March 18	Providence	1 - 2	3OT	Massachusetts–Lowell	TD Garden	Recap
(Saracino, Pinho) Vincent Desharnais - 06:38		First period		18:54 - C. J. Smith (Gambardella)
No scoring		Second period		No scoring
No scoring		Third period		No scoring
No scoring		Third overtime period		12:27 - A. J. White (Fallon)
( 42 saves / 44 shots ) Nick Ellis		Goalie stats		Kevin Boyle ( 58 saves / 59 shots )

=== Championship ===
==== (4) Massachusetts–Lowell vs. (6) Northeastern ====
March 21	Massachusetts–Lowell	2 - 3	Northeastern	TD Garden	Recap
(Gambardella, Panico) John Edwardh - 03:25		First period	01:12 - Adam Gaudette (McMurtry, Sikura); 06:30 - Nolan Stevens (J. Stevens, Aston-Reese)
(Kamrass, Zink) Adam Chapie - 13:34		Second period	No scoring
No scoring		Third period	11:03 - GW PP - Zach Aston-Reese (J. Stevens, N. Stevens)
( 21 saves / 23 shots ) Kevin Boyle		Goalie stats	Ryan Ruck ( 21 saves / 24 shots )

== Tournament awards ==
=== All-Tournament Team ===
- F Nolan Stevens (Northeastern)
- F Zach Aston-Reese (Northeastern)
- F C. J. Smith (Massachusetts–Lowell)
- D Colton Saucerman (Northeastern)
- D Dylan Zink (Massachusetts–Lowell)
- G Kevin Boyle* (Massachusetts–Lowell)

* Tournament MVP(s)
