= Zach Aston-Reese =

American ice hockey player (born 1994)

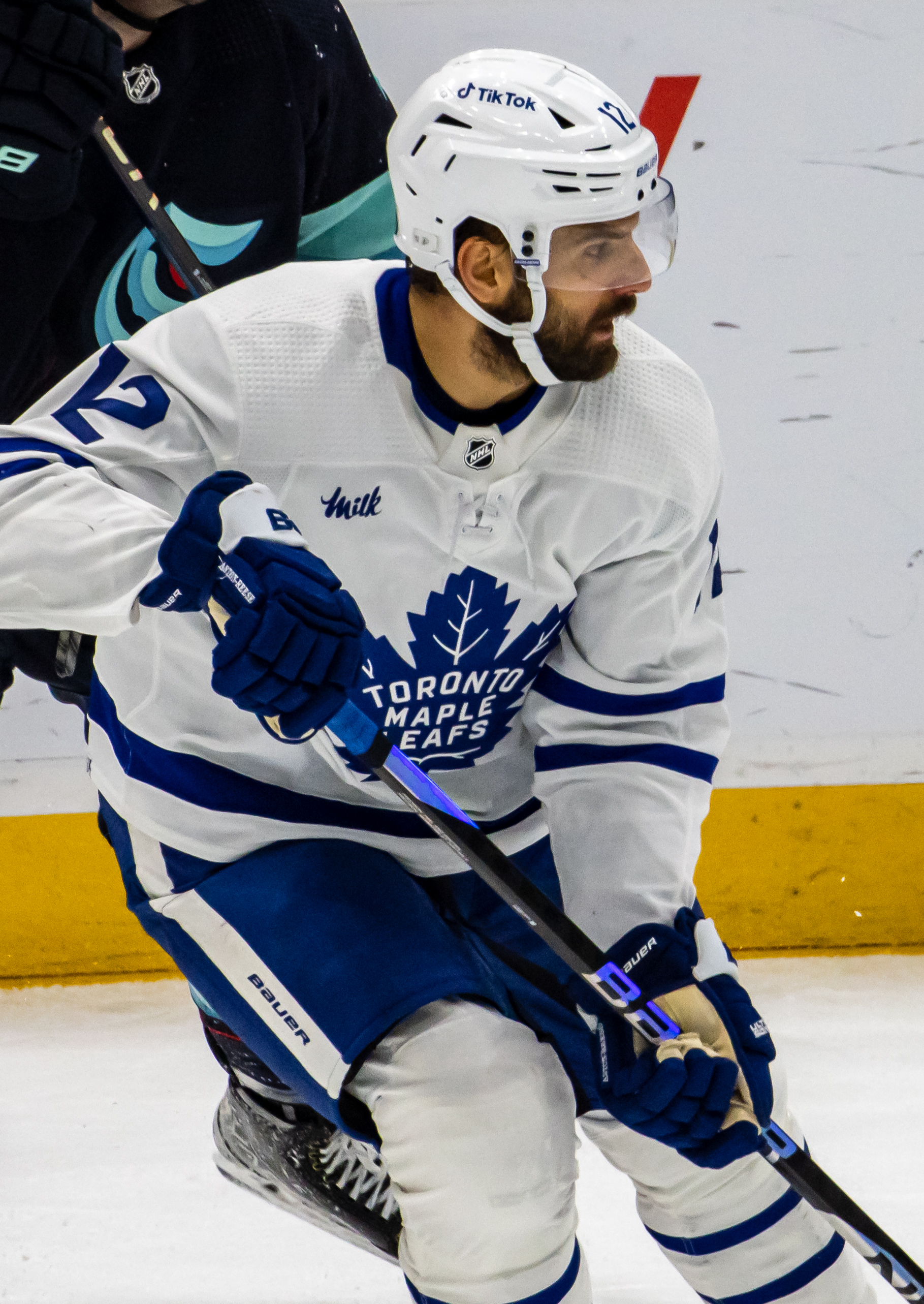
- Aston-Reese with the Toronto Maple Leafs in 2023
- Born: August 10, 1994 (age 32) Staten Island, New York, U.S.
- Height: 6 ft 0 in (183 cm)
- Weight: 204 lb (93 kg; 14 st 8 lb)
- Position: Forward
- Shoots: Left
- NHL team (P) Cur. team Former teams: Philadelphia Flyers; Lehigh Valley Phantoms (AHL); Pittsburgh Penguins; Anaheim Ducks; Toronto Maple Leafs; Detroit Red Wings; Columbus Blue Jackets
- NHL draft: Undrafted
- Playing career: 2017–present

Zachary Aston-Reese (born August 10, 1994) is an American professional ice hockey player who is a forward for the Lehigh Valley Phantoms of the American Hockey League (AHL) while under contract to the Philadelphia Flyers of the National Hockey League (NHL). He previously played with the Pittsburgh Penguins, Anaheim Ducks, Toronto Maple Leafs, Detroit Red Wings and Columbus Blue Jackets.

Prior to turning professional, Aston-Reese played for Northeastern University. He was named a Hobey Baker hat trick finalist, Hockey East First-Team All-Star, and won Hockey East Player of the Year.

== Playing career ==
=== Amateur ===
While playing for the New Jersey Rockets of the Atlantic Junior Hockey League (AJHL) during the 2010–11 season, Aston-Reese also appeared in the United States Hockey League (USHL). He played two games for the Des Moines Buccaneers, as well as 25 games for the Lincoln Stars. Aston-Reese joined the Stars full-time for the 2011–12 season. In 53 games, he recorded 5 goals and 10 assists. After one more season with the Stars, Aston-Reese joined the Division 1 Northeastern Huskies. He played for the club for four seasons. During the 2015–16 season, the Huskies won the Hockey East Tournament championship. The following season, Aston-Reese was named to the Hockey East First All-Star Team, NCAA Division I First All-American Team, and the Hockey East Player of the Year.

=== Professional ===
==== Pittsburgh Penguins ====
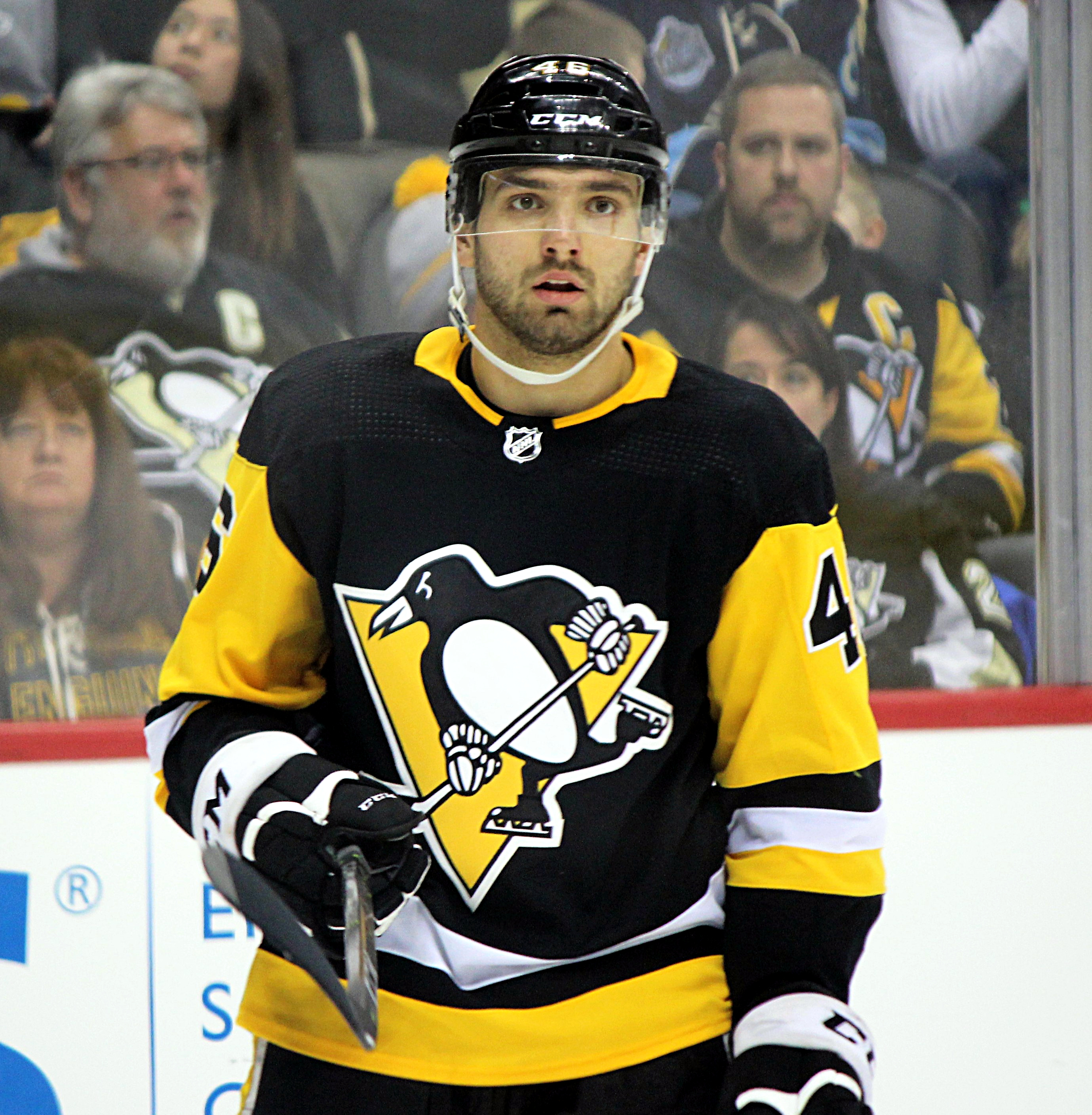
Aston-Reese with the Pittsburgh Penguins in 2018

On March 14, 2017, Aston-Reese, as an undrafted player, signed a two-year, entry-level contract with the Pittsburgh Penguins. He joined the Penguins American Hockey League (AHL) affiliate, the Wilkes-Barre/Scranton Penguins for the remainder of the season, recording eight points in ten games.

Aston-Reese started the 2017–18 season in the minors, but made his NHL debut on February 3, 2018, against the New Jersey Devils. He recorded his first two NHL goals in a 6–3 win over the Ottawa Senators on February 13. On February 27, Aston-Reese suffered an upper-body injury during practice. He returned to the Penguins' lineup on March 27 after missing 13 games. Aston-Reese made his postseason debut on April 11, 2018, against the Philadelphia Flyers. On April 18, he recorded his first career playoff point, assisting on a goal by Riley Sheahan. During Game 3 of Round 2 against the Washington Capitals, Aston-Reese was checked by Tom Wilson, resulting in a broken jaw and a concussion. Wilson was suspended three playoff games for the hit.

Prior to the beginning of the 2018–19 season, Aston-Reese was reassigned to Wilkes-Barre/Scranton. However, he was called to the NHL on November 6, after he recorded six goals in 11 games. Aston-Reese managed to score six goals and eleven points in his next 30 games, but he broke his hand in a game against the Florida Panthers on January 8, 2019.

On July 22, 2019, the Penguins re-signed Aston-Reese to a two-year, $2 million contract extension.

As a restricted free agent after the 2020–2021 season, Aston-Reese filed for salary arbitration with the Penguins. The arbitration hearing was scheduled for August 23, 2021. On August 5, 2021, the Penguins re-signed Aston-Reese to a one-year, $1.725 million contract, avoiding the arbitration hearing.

==== Anaheim Ducks ====
On March 21, 2022, Aston-Reese was traded by Pittsburgh, along with Dominik Simon, prospect Calle Clang, and a second round draft choice to the Anaheim Ducks in exchange for Rickard Rakell.

==== Toronto Maple Leafs ====
Ahead of the 2022–23 NHL season, Aston-Reese joined the Toronto Maple Leafs for a professional tryout (PTO). Following a successful pre-season showing, Aston-Reese was signed to a one-year, $840,000 contract with the Maple Leafs on October 9, 2022. He got his first goal as a Maple Leaf in their 5–2 win against the Philadelphia Flyers on November 2. He finished the season with ten goals and 14 points in 77 games and took part in the Maple Leafs' first postseason series win since 2004.

==== Detroit Red Wings ====
An unrestricted free agent in the offseason, Aston-Reese signed a professional try-out agreement with the Carolina Hurricanes on September 14, 2023. However, on October 6, Aston-Reese was one of six players released from their PTOs by the Hurricanes. Two days later, on October 8, Aston-Reese signed a one-year, two-way contract with the Detroit Red Wings. He opened the 2023–24 season with Detroit's AHL affiliate, the Grand Rapids Griffins, before he was recalled by the Red Wings on October 14, 2023. He returned to Grand Rapids on October 15 without playing a game for Detroit. He was recalled again by Detroit on December 11 on an emergency basis after a series of injuries to Red Wings forwards. He made his season debut with the Red Wings that day in a 6–3 loss to the Dallas Stars. He was sent back to Grand Rapids on December 15.

==== Columbus Blue Jackets ====
On July 1, 2024, Aston-Reese signed a one-year, two-way contract with the Vegas Golden Knights. However, before playing a game for Vegas, Aston-Reese was claimed off waivers by the Columbus Blue Jackets on October 7, 2024, ahead of the 2024–25 season.

==== Philadelphia Flyers ====
On July 1, 2026, Aston-Reese signed a two-year contract with the Philadelphia Flyers.

== Personal life ==
Aston-Reese was born on August 10, 1994, in the New York City borough of Staten Island. He is the third child of William Sr. and Carolyn (née Buckheit). He has three older siblings: a sister, Kristen, and two brothers, Todd and William Jr. He attended PS 45 in West Brighton and Morris Intermediate School in Brighton Heights, New York, then enrolled at St. Peter's Prep in Jersey City, where he played his freshman year

Aston-Reese was a graphic design major in college and occasionally worked in the Penguins' front office on the design of gameday programs.

== Career statistics ==
			Regular season					Playoffs
Season	Team	League	GP	G	A	Pts	PIM	GP	G	A	Pts	PIM
2009–10	New Jersey Rockets	AtJHL	36	13	20	33	31	4	3	0	3	12
2010–11	New Jersey Rockets	AtJHL	25	9	20	29	65	—	—	—	—	—
2010–11	Des Moines Buccaneers	USHL	2	0	0	0	2	—	—	—	—	—
2010–11	Lincoln Stars	USHL	25	2	3	5	4	1	0	0	0	5
2011–12	Lincoln Stars	USHL	35	5	10	15	69	8	1	2	3	8
2012–13	Lincoln Stars	USHL	60	9	21	30	113	5	2	3	5	4
2013–14	Northeastern University	HE	35	8	11	19	22	—	—	—	—	—
2014–15	Northeastern University	HE	31	13	10	23	60	—	—	—	—	—
2015–16	Northeastern University	HE	41	14	29	43	28	—	—	—	—	—
2016–17	Northeastern University	HE	38	31	32	63	72	—	—	—	—	—
2016–17	Wilkes-Barre/Scranton Penguins	AHL	10	3	5	8	7	—	—	—	—	—
2017–18	Wilkes-Barre/Scranton Penguins	AHL	41	9	20	29	49	—	—	—	—	—
2017–18	Pittsburgh Penguins	NHL	16	4	2	6	2	9	0	1	1	4
2018–19	Wilkes-Barre/Scranton Penguins	AHL	11	6	3	9	18	—	—	—	—	—
2018–19	Pittsburgh Penguins	NHL	43	8	9	17	26	4	0	0	0	0
2019–20	Pittsburgh Penguins	NHL	57	6	7	13	28	4	0	1	1	2
2020–21	Pittsburgh Penguins	NHL	45	9	6	15	15	6	1	1	2	2
2021–22	Pittsburgh Penguins	NHL	52	2	9	11	22	—	—	—	—	—
2021–22	Anaheim Ducks	NHL	17	3	1	4	6	—	—	—	—	—
2022–23	Toronto Maple Leafs	NHL	77	10	4	14	25	6	1	0	1	0
2023–24	Grand Rapids Griffins	AHL	61	14	16	30	53	9	1	1	2	2
2023–24	Detroit Red Wings	NHL	3	0	0	0	2	—	—	—	—	—
2024–25	Columbus Blue Jackets	NHL	79	6	11	17	27	—	—	—	—	—
2025–26	Columbus Blue Jackets	NHL	27	1	4	5	12	—	—	—	—	—
2025–26	Cleveland Monsters	AHL	27	8	8	16	32	8	2	1	3	6
NHL totals			416	49	53	102	165	29	2	3	5	8

== Awards and honors ==
Award	Year
USHL
USHL/NHL Top Prospects Game	2012
College
HE Second All-Star Team	2016
HE All-Tournament Team	2016
HE First All-Star Team	2017
HE Player of the Year	2017
New England MVP	2017
AHCA East First-Team All-American	2017

Awards and achievements
Preceded by Kevin Boyle / Thatcher Demko	Hockey East Player of the Year; 2016–17	Succeeded by Adam Gaudette
Preceded by Kyle Connor	NCAA Ice Hockey Scoring Champion; 2016–17; With: Mike Vecchione and Tyler Kelleher	Succeeded by Adam Gaudette
