= C. J. Smith (ice hockey) =

American ice hockey player (born 1994)

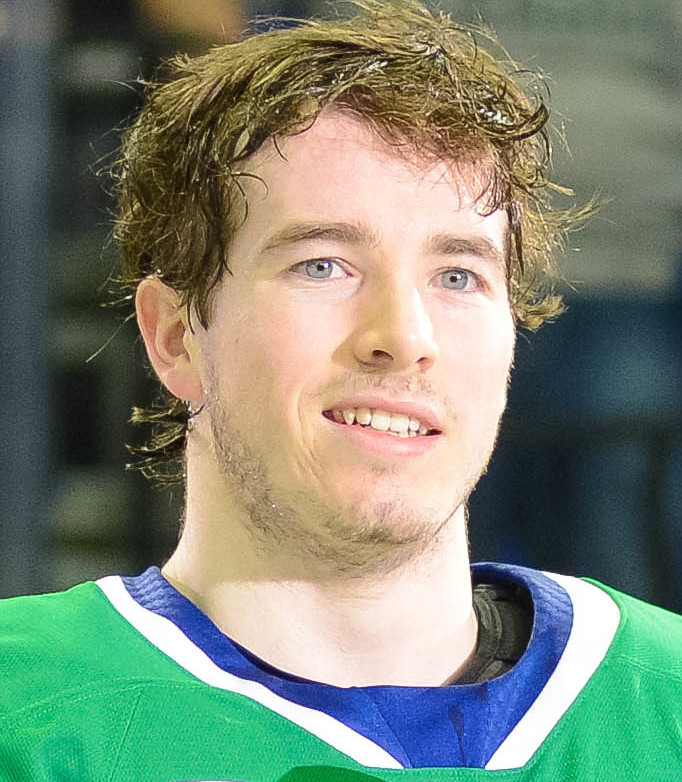
- Smith at the 2018 AHL All-Star Game
- Born: December 1, 1994 (age 31) Des Moines, Iowa, U.S.
- Height: 5 ft 11 in (180 cm)
- Weight: 185 lb (84 kg; 13 st 3 lb)
- Position: Forward
- Shoots: Left
- DEL team Former teams: Fischtown Pinguins; Buffalo Sabres; Carolina Hurricanes; JYP Jyväskylä; Barys Astana; Charlotte Checkers; Bridgeport Islanders
- NHL draft: Undrafted
- Playing career: 2017–present

Connor Jeffrey Smith (born December 1, 1994) is an American professional ice hockey forward who plays for the Fischtown Pinguins of the Deutsche Eishockey Liga.

== Playing career ==
=== Amateur ===
Smith grew up playing hockey in Des Moines before moving with his family to Minnesota when he was 14. He played college hockey for UMass Lowell of Hockey East for three seasons while majoring in chemistry. In his freshman season at UMass, Smith was named to the All Hockey East Rookie Team after he led the team with 16 goals, 19 assists for a total of 35 points. He also became the first River Hawk rookie since Scott Wilson in 2011 to score 30 points in a season. On April 21, Smith and Zack Kamrass were awarded the UMass Lowell Hockey Most Valuable Player Award. Smith was also awarded the River Hawks Rookie of the Year.

In his sophomore year, Smith was named to the Hockey East All-Tournament Team and won the River Hawks leading scorer award. He recorded his first career hat trick in an 8–1 win over Arizona State on January 30, 2016. In the 2016 Hockey East Men's Ice Hockey Tournament, Smith helped Massachusetts–Lowell beat Boston University in the Quarterfinals to advance to the Semifinals and eventually the Championship. UMass lost in the Championship match against Northeastern 3–2.

In his junior year, Smith was named a semi-finalist for the Walter Brown Award as the best American-born college hockey player in New England. The River Hawks won the 2017 Hockey East Men's Ice Hockey Tournament and Smith was named to the All Tournament Team and Tournament MVP. On March 29, 2017, Smith chose to forgo his senior year at UMass and signed as an undrafted free agent by the National Hockey League's Buffalo Sabres.

=== Professional ===
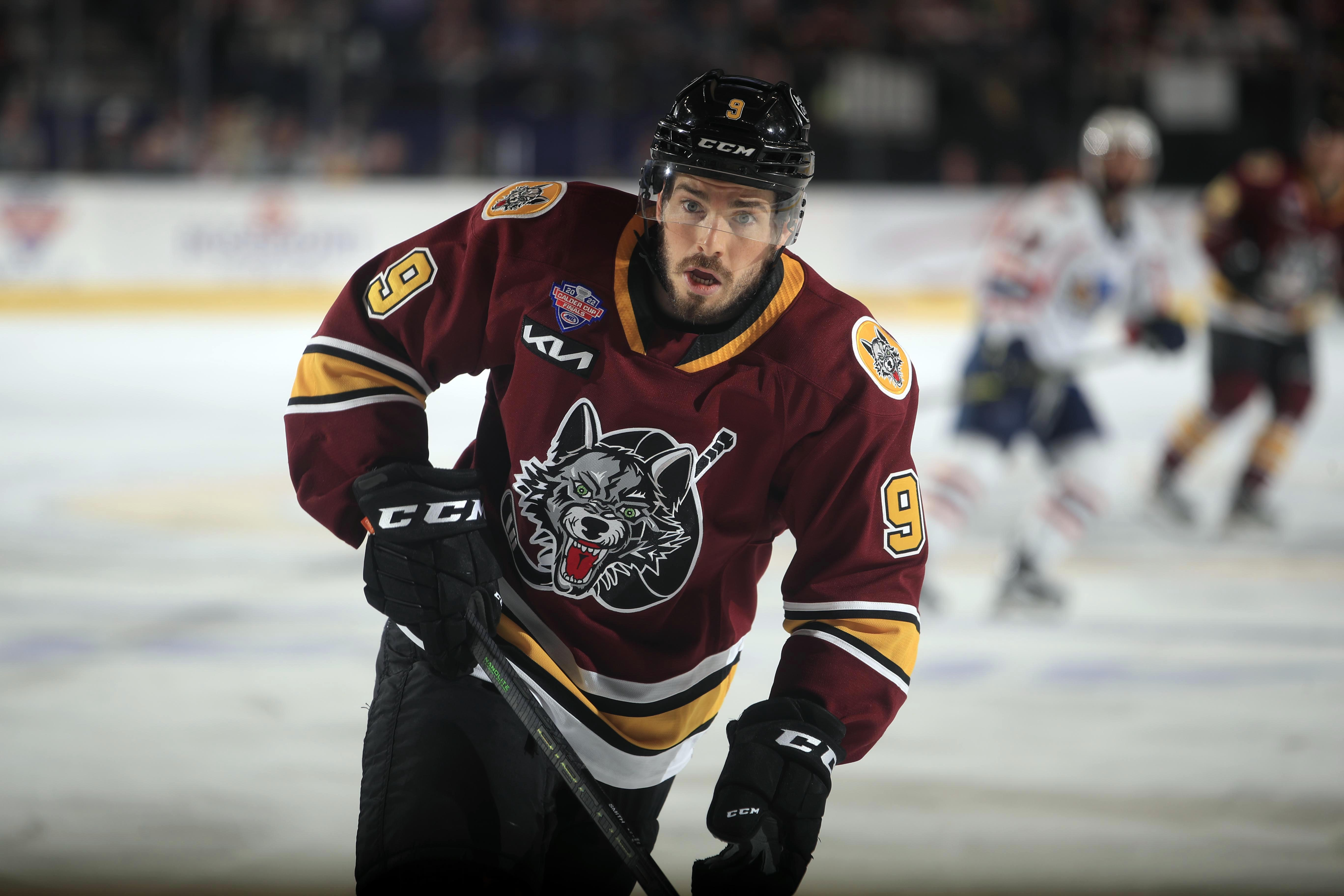
C. J. Smith during the 2022 Calder Cup Finals

Smith made his Sabres debut on April 2, 2017 in a 4–2 loss to the New York Islanders, in which he also got his first NHL point with an assist on a goal by Evander Kane. When Smith made his debut, he became one of only two players in league history to have been born in the state of Iowa, joining goaltender Scott Clemmensen.

Smith played the 2017–18 season with the Sabres American Hockey League (AHL) affiliate, the Rochester Americans. In his rookie season with the Americans, Smith was named to the 2018 AHL All-Star Classic on January 4, 2018. On July 16, 2018, Smith signed a one-year, two way contract with the Sabres worth $874,125.

Smith began the following season with the Rochester Americans after being cut from the Sabres training camp. On January 8, 2019, Smith scored his first NHL goal in the second period against the New Jersey Devils.

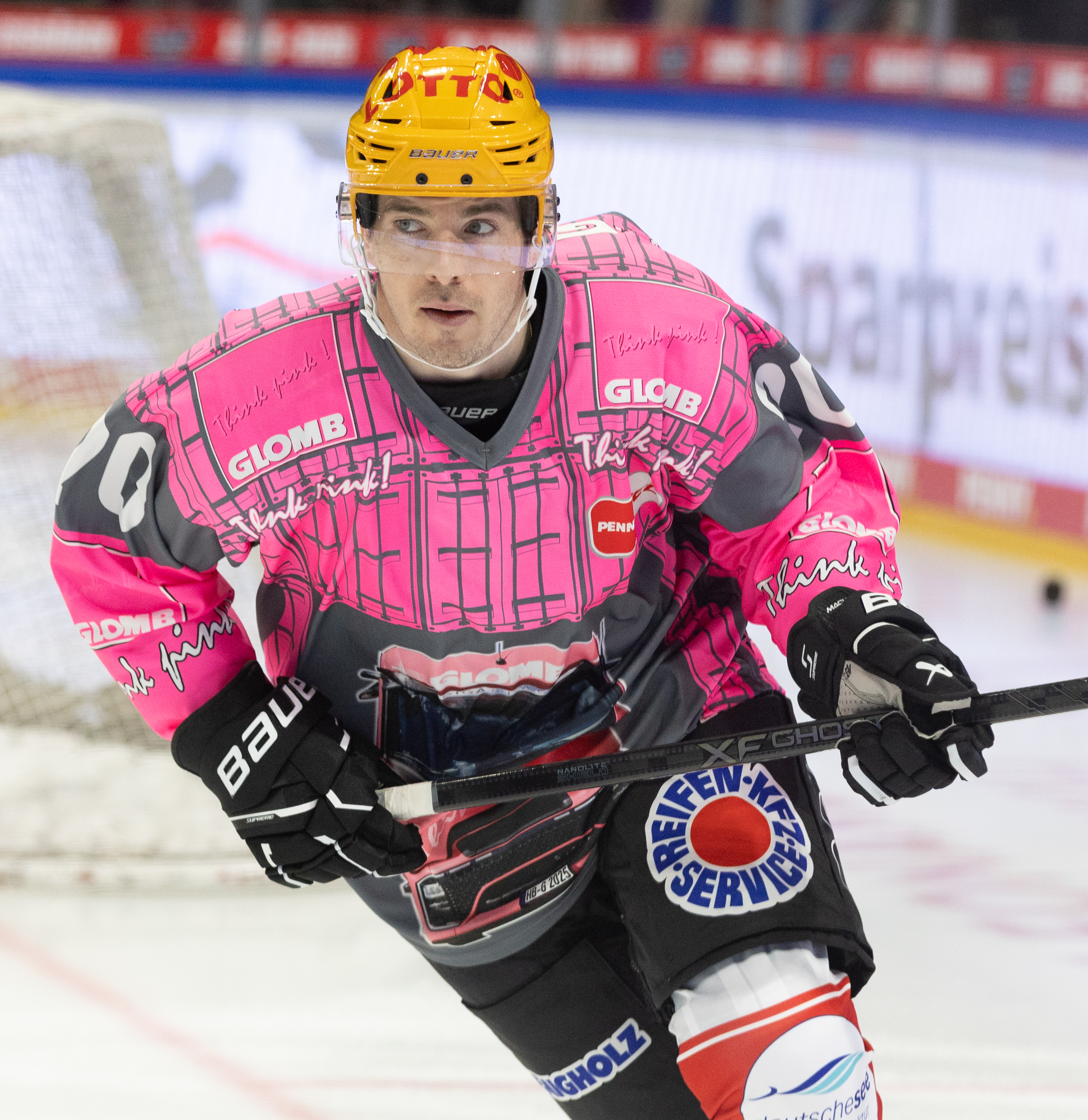
Smith with Fischtown Pinguins Bremerhaven in 2026

As a free agent after five seasons within the Sabres organization, Smith was signed to a one-year, two-way contract with the Carolina Hurricanes on July 28, 2021.

On August 2, 2022, Smith was signed as a free agent to a one-year, two-way contract with the New York Rangers.

On November 20, 2023, Smith signed a one-year contract with JYP Jyväskylä of the Finnish Liiga.

In the following 2024–25 season, Smith moved to the Kontinental Hockey League, in joining Kazakh based club, Barys Astana on June 28, 2024. He made just 9 appearances with Barys, going scoreless, before opting to mutually terminate his contract. On January 20, 2025, Adler Mannheim of the German Ice Hockey League announced it had signed Smith to a try-out contract.

His try-out with Mannheim ended after Smith opted to return to North America and sign a contract for the remainder of the season with the Charlotte Checkers, the primary affiliate to the Florida Panthers, on January 24, 2025.

== Career statistics ==
			Regular season					Playoffs
Season	Team	League	GP	G	A	Pts	PIM	GP	G	A	Pts	PIM
2010–11	Academy of Holy Angels	USHS	25	17	20	37	18	1	0	0	0	10
2011–12	Austin Bruins	NAHL	53	13	14	27	20	—	—	—	—	—
2012–13	Austin Bruins	NAHL	60	30	29	59	22	8	4	1	5	4
2013–14	Muskegon Lumberjacks	USHL	13	4	1	5	6	—	—	—	—	—
2013–14	Chicago Steel	USHL	46	23	17	40	10	—	—	—	—	—
2014–15	UMass-Lowell	HE	39	16	19	35	28	—	—	—	—	—
2015–16	UMass-Lowell	HE	40	17	22	39	50	—	—	—	—	—
2016–17	UMass-Lowell	HE	41	23	28	51	46	—	—	—	—	—
2016–17	Buffalo Sabres	NHL	2	0	1	1	0	—	—	—	—	—
2017–18	Rochester Americans	AHL	57	17	27	44	16	3	0	2	2	0
2018–19	Rochester Americans	AHL	62	28	30	58	26	3	1	1	2	0
2018–19	Buffalo Sabres	NHL	11	2	0	2	0	—	—	—	—	—
2019–20	Rochester Americans	AHL	50	12	15	27	18	—	—	—	—	—
2020–21	Rochester Americans	AHL	15	4	9	13	6	—	—	—	—	—
2020–21	Buffalo Sabres	NHL	1	0	0	0	0	—	—	—	—	—
2021–22	Chicago Wolves	AHL	60	24	34	58	18	16	3	6	9	4
2021–22	Carolina Hurricanes	NHL	1	0	0	0	0	—	—	—	—	—
2022–23	Hartford Wolf Pack	AHL	21	4	2	6	6	—	—	—	—	—
2023–24	JYP Jyväskylä	Liiga	33	8	12	20	10	—	—	—	—	—
2024–25	Barys Astana	KHL	9	0	0	0	0	—	—	—	—	—
2024–25	Charlotte Checkers	AHL	33	6	16	22	10	14	1	3	4	10
2025–26	Bridgeport Islanders	AHL	17	0	8	8	8	—	—	—	—	—
NHL totals			15	2	1	3	0	—	—	—	—	—

== Awards and honors ==
Award	Year
College
HE All-Rookie Team	2015
HE All-Tournament Team	2016, 2017
HE Honorable Mention All-Star Team	2017
HE Tournament MVP	2017
AHL
All-Star Game	2017–18
Calder Cup champion	2022
