= Adam Gaudette =

American ice hockey player (born 1996)

- Gaudette with the San Jose Sharks in 2026
- Born: October 3, 1996 (age 30) Taunton, Massachusetts, U.S.
- Height: 6 ft 1 in (185 cm)
- Weight: 190 lb (86 kg; 13 st 8 lb)
- Position: Center
- Shoots: Right
- NHL team Former teams: San Jose Sharks; Vancouver Canucks; Chicago Blackhawks; Ottawa Senators; St. Louis Blues
- National team: United States
- NHL draft: 149th overall, 2015; Vancouver Canucks
- Playing career: 2018–present

Adam Gaudette (born October 3, 1996) is an American professional ice hockey player who is a center for the San Jose Sharks of the National Hockey League (NHL). He previously played for the Vancouver Canucks, Chicago Blackhawks, Ottawa Senators and St. Louis Blues. Gaudette played college ice hockey for the Northeastern Huskies of the NCAA, where he won the Hobey Baker Award, Hockey East Player of the Year, and was named to the AHCA East First-Team All-American. Selected by the Vancouver Canucks in the 2015 NHL entry draft, Gaudette made his NHL debut with the team in 2018.

== Early life ==
Gaudette was born on October 3, 1996, in Taunton, Massachusetts, to Tara, an elementary school instructional coach, and Doug Gaudette, a firefighter. He came from an athletic family: his mother played softball for Taunton High School, once holding the single-season home run record, while his father's high school athletic career ended after a dirt bike accident shattered his patella. Gaudette played a number of sports, including lacrosse and baseball, but his favorite was ice hockey. In sixth grade, Gaudette was admitted to Thayer Academy to join their hockey team, and his family moved from Taunton to Braintree, Massachusetts, to accommodate his commute to and from the skating rink. There, he was coached by former National Hockey League (NHL) player Tony Amonte. Although he lost most of his first two high school ice hockey seasons to injuries, as a junior, Gaudette recorded 67 points in 27 games. Around this same time, he played minor ice hockey for the Boston Advantage of the Tier 1 Elite Hockey League.

== Playing career ==
=== Amateur ===
In the 2013–14 season, Gaudette scored 29 goals in 27 games at Thayer Academy. In 2014, he committed to playing for Northeastern University of the National Collegiate Athletic Association (NCAA). Skating as a freshman for the Cedar Rapids RoughRiders of the United States Hockey League, Gaudette scored 13 goals and 17 assists for 30 points in 41 games. In the 2014–15 season, Gaudette moved to Northeastern to commence his college hockey career. In 41 games with the Northeastern Huskies, Gaudette recorded 12 goals and 30 points. The following season in 2015–16, Gaudette was promoted to the second line and the second power play unit after an injury to Kevin Roy. In his new position alongside Dylan Sikura, his scoring improved, marking 26 goals and 52 points in 37 games. In March 2016, he tallied a goal and an assist against Boston College to propel Northeastern to the Hockey East Championship.

In 2017 he was called a "first-rate prospect," ranking first in NCAA power-play goals with 14 and third in points after 31 games and in the top 10 nationally. Pierre McGuire described him as "the steal of the 2015 draft." During the 2017–18 season Gaudette recorded career highs in goals and assists while leading the Huskies to their first Beanpot championship in 30 years. During the 66th Beanpot Final, Gaudette recorded a hat trick to help Northeastern beat Boston University 5–2. He earned the Most Outstanding Player for his efforts. He finished the 2017–18 season first in the NCAA with 60 points. At the end of the season, Gaudette won Hockey East Player of the Year and was awarded the Hockey East Scoring Champion title. He was also named to the First All-Star Team. On April 6, 2018, Gaudette was announced as the Hobey Baker Award winner. He was also named an AHCA East First-Team All-American along with teammates Dylan Sikura and Jérémy Davies.

=== Professional ===
==== Vancouver Canucks ====
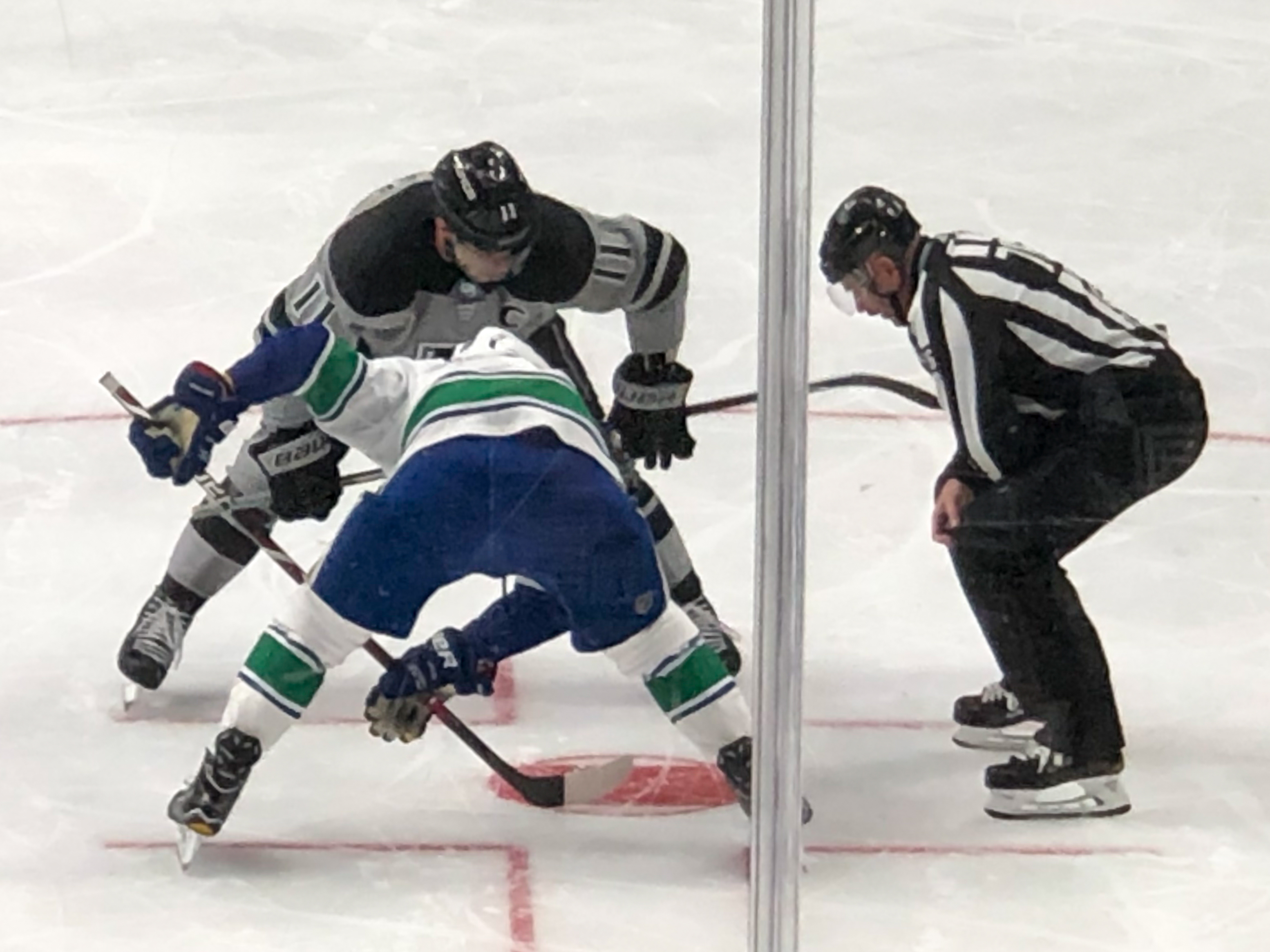
Gaudette facing off against Anže Kopitar in 2018

The Vancouver Canucks of the NHL selected Gaudette in the fifth round, 149th overall, of the 2015 NHL entry draft after acquiring the pick from the New York Rangers in exchange for defenseman Raphael Diaz. Gaudette signed an entry-level contract with the Canucks on March 26, 2018, and made his NHL debut on March 29, in a game against the Edmonton Oilers. As the Canucks failed to make the post season, he only appeared in five games, going scoreless.

After attending Canucks training camp prior to the 2018–19 season, Gaudette was reassigned to their American Hockey League (AHL) affiliate, the Utica Comets. However, his stint in the AHL did not last long as he was called up to the NHL on October 15 after playing in four games for the Comets, where he tallied two goals and two assists. On October 25, he earned his first career NHL point, assisting on a Darren Archibald goal, the only Canucks goal scored in a 4–1 loss at the Arizona Coyotes. He scored his first NHL goal on November 24, tallying the first Canucks goal in a 4–2 victory over the Los Angeles Kings. Despite being expected to spend most of the season developing in Utica, injuries to Canucks centers resulted in Gaudette appearing in 56 games for Vancouver. Gaudette ended his rookie season with five goals and seven assists, generally playing center on Vancouver's third line.

Gaudette made Vancouver's 2019–20 season roster out of training camp; however, he was reassigned to Utica on October 24, 2019, after playing in only three of Vancouver's first nine games. After being recalled on October 27, Gaudette responded by scoring six goals and ten points in November, solidifying his spot in the lineup. Gaudette ended 2019–20 season with 12 goals, 21 assists, and 33 points in 59 games before the NHL suspended play due to the COVID-19 pandemic on March 12, 2020. When play resumed, Gaudette played in 10 of Vancouver 17 playoff games, going pointless. On October 19, 2020, the Canucks re-signed Gaudette to a one-year, $950,000 contract. In the pandemic-shortened 2020–21 season he appeared in 33 games for the Canucks, scoring four goals and seven points. In April 2021, the Canucks suffered a significant COVID-19 outbreak, with Gaudette among the diagnosed.

==== Chicago Blackhawks and Ottawa Senators ====
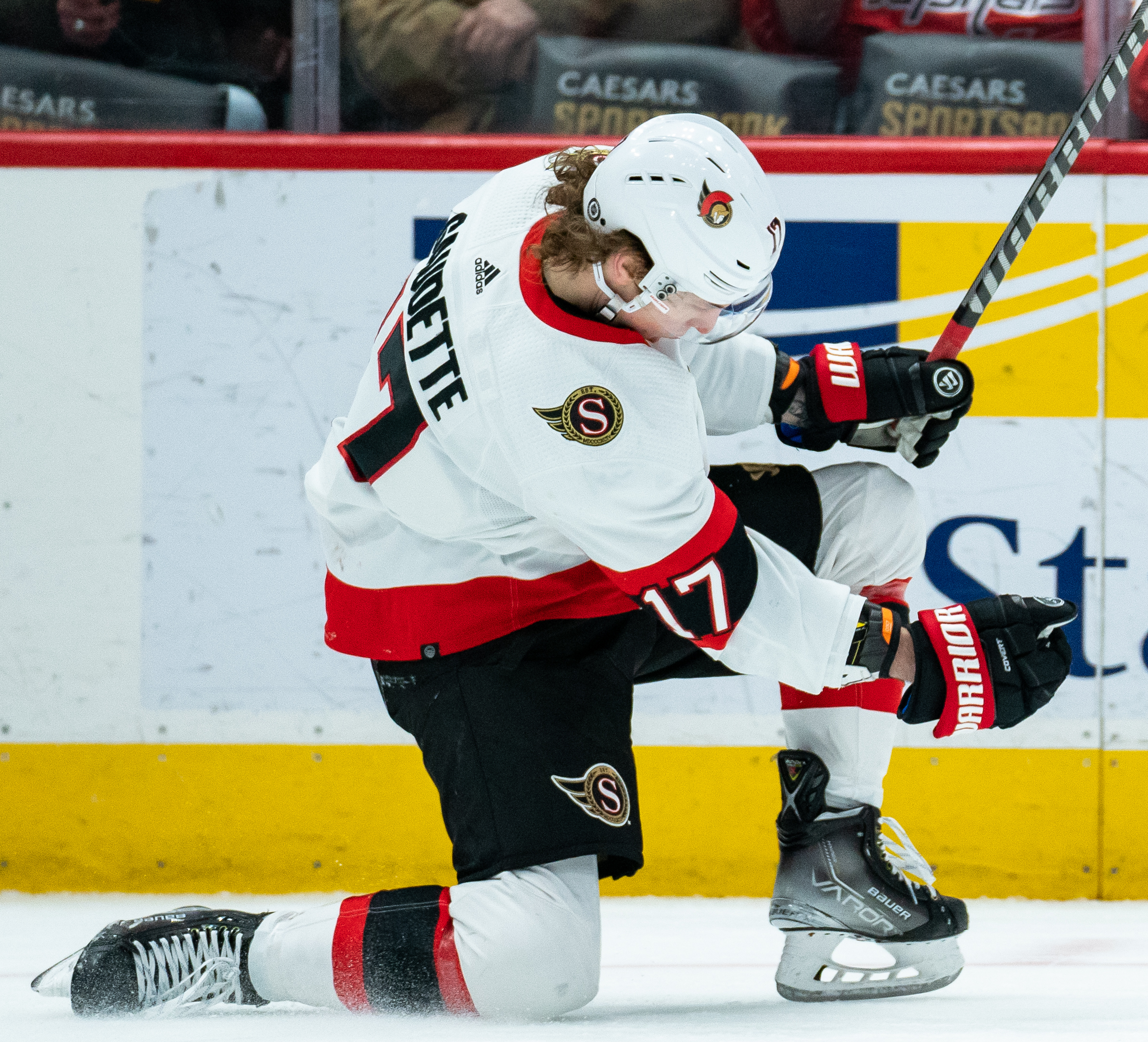
Gaudette with the Ottawa Senators

On April 12, 2021, Gaudette was traded at the NHL trade deadline to the Chicago Blackhawks in exchange for Matthew Highmore. He made his Blackhawks debut on April 19 in a 5–2 loss to the Nashville Predators, recording his first point for the team, assisting on David Kampf's second period goal. He marked his first goal with Chicago in his next game with the team on April 29 in a 4–3 overtime loss to the Florida Panthers. He played in seven games for the Blackhawks to close out the season, scoring one goal and four points. On July 26, the Blackhawks signed Gaudette to a one-year, $997,500 contract extension.

After working on his diet in the offseason, he earned a spot on the Blackhawks roster out of training camp ahead of the 2021–22 season. He played in eight games with the Blackhawks, scoring one goal and two points. On November 26, the Blackhawks placed Gaudette on waivers. Gaudette was claimed by the Ottawa Senators the following day. He made his Senators debut on December 1 and scored his first goal with the team in a 6–2 loss to the Vancouver Canucks. He played in 50 games for the Senators, scoring four goals and 12 points.

==== Toronto Maple Leafs and St. Louis Blues ====
As a free agent, after not being tendered a qualifying offer from the Senators, Gaudette was signed a one-year, $750,000 contract by the Toronto Maple Leafs on July 13, 2022. Gaudette cleared waivers and was assigned to the Maple Leafs' AHL affiliate, the Toronto Marlies, on October 13. On December 9, Gaudette was suspended for three games for an incident during a game with the Belleville Senators. He played in 40 games with the Marlies, scoring 20 goals and 34 points.

On February 17, 2023, the Maple Leafs traded Gaudette to the St. Louis Blues, along with prospect Mikhail Abramov and several draft picks as part of a three-team trade also involving the Minnesota Wild. The Maple Leafs acquired Ryan O'Reilly and Noel Acciari in the trade. He spent the remainder of the season with the Blues' AHL affiliate, the Springfield Thunderbirds, recording seven goals and 17 points in 25 games. The Thunderbirds qualified for the playoffs and faced the Hartford Wolf Pack in the opening round. The Wolf Pack swept the Thunderbirds in two games in their best-of-three series. Gaudette tallied one goal in the two games.

On June 21, Gaudette re-signed with the Blues on a one-year two-way contract. Gaudette attended the Blues 2023 training camp but failed to make the team. He was placed on waivers and after going unclaimed, was assigned to Springfield to start the 2023–24 season. He played in 67 games with Springfield, tallying 44 goals and 71 points. He was recalled by St. Louis on January 17, 2024, and made his Blues' debut on January 18 in a 5–2 loss to the Washington Capitals. He made one more appearance, going scoreless with St. Louis before being returned to the AHL on January 30. He was named to the AHL's First All-Star Team at season's end, the first Thunderbird to be honored. He was also awarded the Willie Marshall Award as the league's leading goal scorer.

==== Second stint in Ottawa and San Jose Sharks ====
On July 2, 2024, Gaudette signed a one-year, two-way contract with the Ottawa Senators. He began the 2024–25 season with Ottawa, but was briefly assigned to Ottawa's AHL affiliate, the Belleville Senators, on October 15. He never played a game for Belleville, being immediately recalled on October 16. Gaudette experienced a resurgent NHL season with the Senators, playing in a career-high 81 games and scoring a career-high 19 goals and 26 points. The Senators qualified for the playoffs and faced the Toronto Maple Leafs in the opening round. He recorded his first NHL playoff goal in Game 2 to tie the game and send the game to overtime. The Senators were ultimately eliminated by the Maple Leafs, with Gaudette recording the one goal and three points in the six games.

After a successful season with the Senators, on July 1, 2025, Gaudette was signed as an unrestricted free agent to a two-year, $4 million contract with the San Jose Sharks beginning from the 2025–26 season. He made his San Jose debut on opening night, October 9, in a 4–3 overtime loss to the Vegas Golden Knights. He recorded his first goal for San Jose in a two-point effort in the following game on October 12 versus the Anaheim Ducks. Gaudette suffered an injury in a game versus the Minnesota Wild on October 26, returning to the lineup on November 5, playing alongside Philipp Kurashev and Alexander Wennberg on the Sharks' second line. He provided depth scoring for the team, finishing with 17 goals and 25 points in 66 games played.

== International play ==
Gaudette was invited to play for Team USA at the 2022 IIHF World Championship. He recorded a three-point game, scoring two goals and adding an assist in a 3–2 victory over Sweden on May 21, 2022. The team finished fourth in the tournament, losing the bronze medal game to Czechia. Gaudette finished the tournament with six goals and eight points in ten games.

== Playing style ==
Gaudette says he tries to model his game after players like Jonathan Toews and Patrice Bergeron. He has been described as a center "known for his defensive prowess and his 200-foot game."

== Personal life ==
Gaudette and his wife married in June 2020. Gaudette has two brothers; youngest brother Cam plays for the Pensacola Ice Flyers of the SPHL, while Brady played NCAA DIII for the Norwich Cadets. During the NHL off-season, Gaudette runs an active Twitch channel, where he streams himself playing video games (mainly Call of Duty) and interacts with fans; he has stated that he enjoys doing this as an opportunity to "give fans some inside intel on what our [NHL players'] lives are like outside of hockey."

== Career statistics ==
=== Regular season and playoffs ===
			Regular season					Playoffs
Season	Team	League	GP	G	A	Pts	PIM	GP	G	A	Pts	PIM
2011–12	Thayer Academy	HS-Prep	15	1	0	1		—	—	—	—	—
2011–12	Boston Advantage 16U AAA	T1EHL	7	2	1	3	0	—	—	—	—	—
2012–13	Thayer Academy	HS-Prep	11	2	3	5		—	—	—	—	—
2012–13	Boston Advantage 16U AAA	T1EHL	6	2	2	4	2	—	—	—	—	—
2013–14	Thayer Academy	HS-Prep	27	29	38	67		—	—	—	—	—
2014–15	Cedar Rapids RoughRiders	USHL	50	13	17	30	55	3	0	0	0	4
2015–16	Northeastern University	HE	41	12	18	30	20	—	—	—	—	—
2016–17	Northeastern University	HE	37	26	26	52	20	—	—	—	—	—
2017–18	Northeastern University	HE	38	30	30	60	41	—	—	—	—	—
2017–18	Vancouver Canucks	NHL	5	0	0	0	0	—	—	—	—	—
2018–19	Utica Comets	AHL	14	5	6	11	12	—	—	—	—	—
2018–19	Vancouver Canucks	NHL	56	5	7	12	18	—	—	—	—	—
2019–20	Utica Comets	AHL	2	1	0	1	0	—	—	—	—	—
2019–20	Vancouver Canucks	NHL	59	12	21	33	37	10	0	0	0	2
2020–21	Vancouver Canucks	NHL	33	4	3	7	12	—	—	—	—	—
2020–21	Chicago Blackhawks	NHL	7	1	3	4	0	—	—	—	—	—
2021–22	Chicago Blackhawks	NHL	8	1	1	2	4	—	—	—	—	—
2021–22	Ottawa Senators	NHL	50	4	8	12	13	—	—	—	—	—
2022–23	Toronto Marlies	AHL	40	20	14	34	47	—	—	—	—	—
2022–23	Springfield Thunderbirds	AHL	25	7	10	17	10	2	1	0	1	2
2023–24	Springfield Thunderbirds	AHL	67	44	27	71	51	—	—	—	—	—
2023–24	St. Louis Blues	NHL	2	0	0	0	4	—	—	—	—	—
2024–25	Ottawa Senators	NHL	81	19	7	26	12	6	1	2	3	4
2025–26	San Jose Sharks	NHL	66	17	8	25	20	—	—	—	—	—
NHL totals			367	63	58	121	120	16	1	2	3	6

=== International ===
Year	Team	Event	Result	GP	G	A	Pts	PIM
2022	United States	WC	4th	10	6	2	8	10
Senior totals				10	6	2	8	10

== Awards and honors ==
Award	Year	Ref
College
Hockey East Player of the Year	2018	
Hockey East Scoring champion	2018	
Hockey East First All-Star team	2018	
Hobey Baker Award	2018	
AHCA East First-Team All-American	2018	
AHL
Willie Marshall Award	2024	
First All-Star Team	2024	

== Bibliography ==
- Chaimovitch, Jason, ed. (2025). 2025–2026 American Hockey League Official Guide & Record Book. Springfield, Massachusetts: American Hockey League. OCLC 22147888.

Awards and achievements
Preceded by Zach Aston-Reese	Hockey East Player of the Year; 2017–18	Succeeded by Cale Makar
Preceded by Anders Bjork; Clayton Keller; Tyler Kelleher	Hockey East Three-Stars Award; 2017–18	Succeeded by Cayden Primeau
Preceded by Tyler Kelleher	Hockey East Scoring Champion; 2017–18	Succeeded by Mitchell Chaffee
Preceded by Zach Aston-Reese; Mike Vecchione; Tyler Kelleher	NCAA Ice Hockey Scoring Champion; 2017–18	Succeeded by Taro Hirose; Alex Limoges
Preceded by Will Butcher	Hobey Baker Award; 2017–18	Succeeded by Cale Makar
