= Tyler Kelleher =

American ice hockey player (born 1995)

- Born: January 2, 1995 (age 31) Longmeadow, Massachusetts, U.S.
- Height: 5 ft 6 in (168 cm)
- Weight: 161 lb (73 kg; 11 st 7 lb)
- Position: Right wing
- Shoots: Right
- HA team Former teams: Modo Hockey; ERC Ingolstadt; IK Oskarshamn; Rögle BK; Tappara; Lahti Pelicans
- NHL draft: Undrafted
- Playing career: 2013–present

Tyler Kelleher (born January 2, 1995) is an American professional ice hockey right wing who currently plays for Modo Hockey in the HockeyAllsvenskan. He was an All-American for New Hampshire.

== Playing career ==
Kelleher had solid junior career, playing on the USNTDP at the end of his high school days. He was selected for both the under-17 and under-18 squads and won a silver medal at the 2013 championship.

The diminutive Kelleher began attending the University of New Hampshire in the fall of 2013 and had a mediocre freshman season. He saw his numbers nearly triple the following year, leading the team's offense. Unfortunately, UNH began to slide in the standings and finished the year 8th in Hockey East. While he continued to produce as an upperclassman, the Wildcats couldn't stop their slide and finished 10th in each of his final two seasons. While he could not help New Hampshire produce winning records, Kelleher became one of the best scorers in college hockey and finished his senior season tied for the NCAA scoring title.

Being undrafted, Kelleher was able to sign with any team and accepted an offer from the Milwaukee Admirals at the end of the 2017 season. Kelleher showed a great deal of promise the following training camp and got off to a hot start, but a knee injury derailed his first full season as a pro. After returning to the ice, he was traded to the Texas Stars for future considerations.

After a disappointing year, Kelleher travelled to Germany to continue his playing career and found much more success with ERC Ingolstadt. After helping the club reach the DEL semifinals in 2019, he spent two seasons with IK Oskarshamn, playing through the uncertainty brought about by COVID-19. In 2021 he debuted for Rögle BK and began his third season in the SHL. Kelleher also played for HV71 in the HockeyAllsvenskan during the 2021–22 season. Kelleher was transferred to Finnish Elite League team Tappara for the 2022–23 season, where he scored his first goal in Finland during a preseason match against HPK. He was then transferred to the Lahti Pelicans on loan. For the 2023–24 season, Kelleher returned to the HockeyAllsvenskan to play for Brynäs IF, which he helped earn promotion up to the SHL. Kelleher earned the play-offs MVP award this year as well. The following season Kelleher repeated this feat with Djurgårdens IF. After this promotion, it was announced that Kelleher had signed a new one-year deal with Modo Hockey to try to earn promotion to SHL once again.

== Career statistics ==
=== Regular season and playoffs ===
			Regular season					Playoffs
Season	Team	League	GP	G	A	Pts	PIM	GP	G	A	Pts	PIM
2009–10	Longmeadow High School	MA-HS	—	—	—	—	—	—	—	—	—	—
2010–11	Deerfield Academy	US-Prep	18	11	15	26	—	—	—	—	—	—
2010–11	WM Blades U16 AAA	MSYHL	7	3	2	5	0	—	—	—	—	—
2011–12	U.S National Development Team	USHL	36	17	13	30	26	2	2	0	2	0
2012–13	U.S. National Development Team	USHL	26	9	10	19	12	—	—	—	—	—
2013–14	U. of New Hampshire	HE	37	5	11	16	4	—	—	—	—	—
2014–15	U. of New Hampshire	HE	39	18	24	42	26	—	—	—	—	—
2015–16	U. of New Hampshire	HE	37	10	36	46	10	—	—	—	—	—
2016–17	U. of New Hampshire	HE	40	24	39	63	32	—	—	—	—	—
2016–17	Milwaukee Admirals	AHL	6	0	2	2	2	—	—	—	—	—
2017–18	Milwaukee Admirals	AHL	26	7	5	12	10	—	—	—	—	—
2017–18	Texas Stars	AHL	13	2	1	3	14	—	—	—	—	—
2018–19	ERC Ingolstadt	DEL	50	13	25	38	48	7	0	8	8	0
2019–20	IK Oskarshamn	SHL	51	13	15	28	24	—	—	—	—	—
2020–21	IK Oskarshamn	SHL	48	8	21	29	12	—	—	—	—	—
2021–22	Rögle BK	SHL	34	4	6	10	12	—	—	—	—	—
2021–22	HV71	Allsv	8	5	2	7	0	15	8	7	15	6
2022–23	Tappara	Liiga	13	1	2	3	2	—	—	—	—	—
2022–23	Lahti Pelicans	Liiga	38	9	17	26	14	18	6	1	7	14
2023–24	Brynäs IF	Allsv	25	11	14	25	12	13	7	8	15	0
2024–25	Djurgårdens IF	Allsv	33	14	10	24	12	16	7	12	19	8
AHL totals			45	9	8	17	26	—	—	—	—	—
SHL totals			133	25	42	67	48	—	—	—	—	—

Medal record

Representing United States

Ice hockey

World U-17 Hockey Challenge
Silver medal – second place	2012 Ontario	

IIHF World U18 Championships
Silver medal – second place	2013 Sochi	

=== International ===
Year	Team	Event	Result	GP	G	A	Pts	PIM
2012	United States	U17	2nd place, silver medalist(s)	6	0	3	3	0
2013	United States	U18	2nd place, silver medalist(s)	7	3	3	6	2
Junior totals				13	3	6	9	2

== Awards and honors ==
Award	Year
All-Hockey East First Team	2016–17
AHCA East Second Team All-American	2016–17

Awards and achievements
Preceded by Kevin Boyle	Hockey East Three-Stars Award; 2016–17; With: Anders Bjork and Clayton Keller	Succeeded by Adam Gaudette
Preceded by Andrew Poturalski	Hockey East Scoring Champion; 2016–17	Succeeded by Adam Gaudette
Preceded by Kyle Connor	NCAA Ice Hockey Scoring Champion; 2016–17; With: Mike Vecchione and Zach Aston-Reese	Succeeded by Adam Gaudette
