= Kevin Boyle (ice hockey) =

American ice hockey player (born 1992)

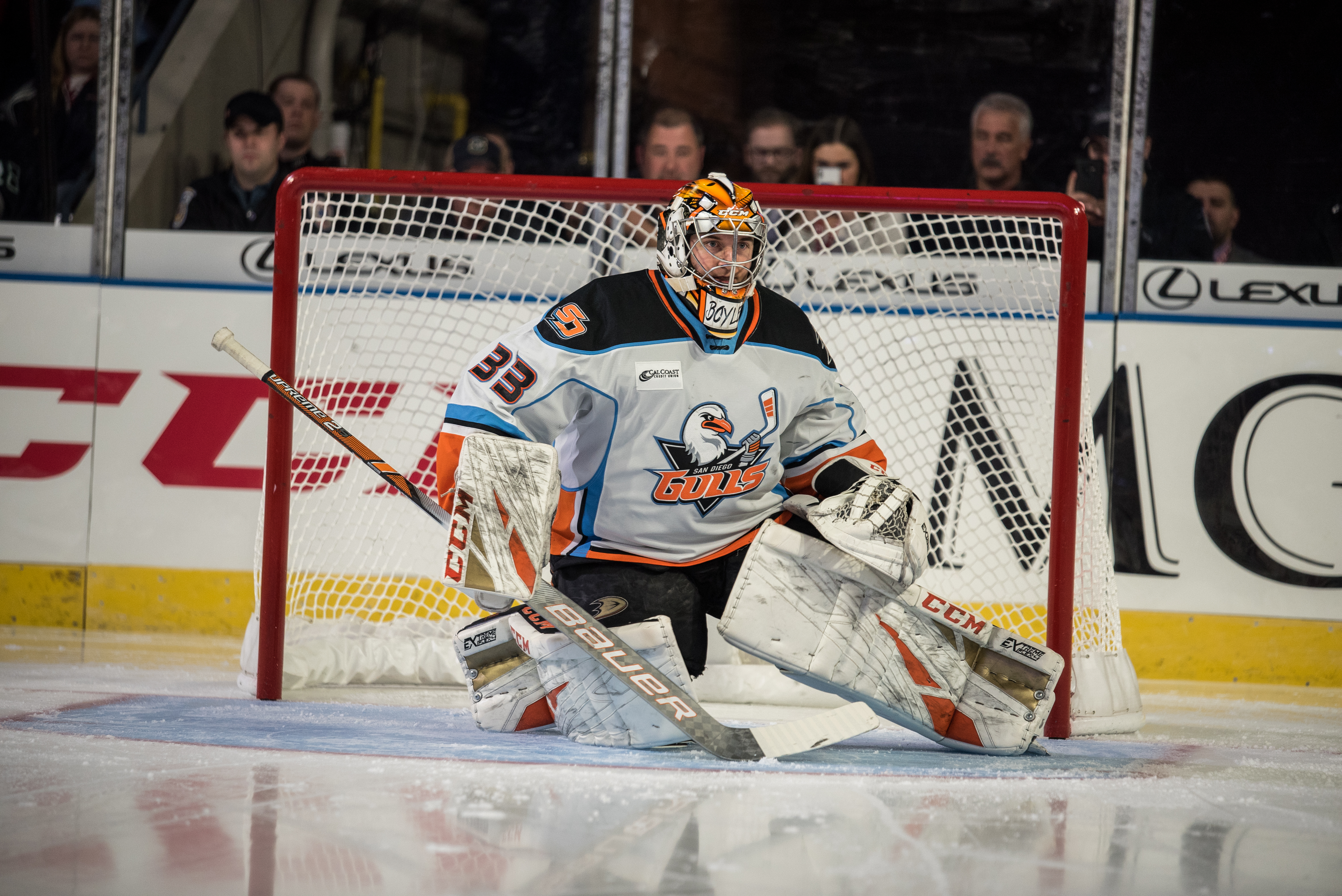
- Boyle with the San Diego Gulls in 2019
- Born: May 30, 1992 (age 34) Manalapan Township, New Jersey, U.S.
- Height: 6 ft 2 in (188 cm)
- Weight: 194 lb (88 kg; 13 st 12 lb)
- Position: Goaltender
- Caught: Left
- Played for: Anaheim Ducks
- NHL draft: Undrafted
- Playing career: 2016–2022

Kevin Boyle (born May 30, 1992) is an American former professional ice hockey goaltender. Boyle played in the National Hockey League (NHL) for the Anaheim Ducks.

Raised in Manalapan Township, New Jersey, Boyle played prep hockey at Manalapan High School.

== Playing career ==
=== Amateur ===
Boyle first played competitive hockey as a junior with the New Jersey Rockets of the Atlantic Junior Hockey League from 2007 through 2010, he made one appearance with the Tri-City Storm of the United States Hockey League (USHL) during his tenure with the Rockets.

Moving to the British Columbia Hockey League (BCHL) as an 18-year old for the 2010–11 season, Boyle appeared in 39 games for the Westside Warriors, earning All-Rookie Team honours.

Boyle originally committed to play collegiate hockey at the University of Massachusetts Amherst of the Hockey East. He played both his freshman and sophomore seasons with the Minutemen posting a 16-17-6 record in 41 games before he was cut by head coach John Micheletto prior to his junior season. He was forced to sit out the 2013–14 season to transfer to rival program the University of Massachusetts Lowell.

Boyle returned to resume his collegiate career with the Riverhawks, enjoying a standout senior season in 2015–16 with Lowell, recording a 24-10-5 record, 1.88 (GAA), .934 (SV%) and seven shutouts to earn Hockey East Goaltender of the Year and Hockey East Co-Player of the Year, alongside Thatcher Demko. He ranked tied for fourth in the nation in GAA, fifth in wins, tied for sixth in SV%, tied for third in shutouts and starts (39), as Boyle established a single-season school record in shutouts and broke former NHL Goaltender Dwayne Roloson's school record for minutes played (2,342 in 1993-94). He was the first player in Hockey East history to win conference Player of the Year honors as a Second-Team All-Conference selection.

=== Professional ===
Undrafted, Boyle gained NHL interest from his collegiate success, resulting in agreeing to a one-year, entry-level contract with the Anaheim Ducks on March 31, 2016.

In his first professional season in 2016–17, Boyle began the year with the Ducks secondary affiliate, the Utah Grizzlies of the ECHL, posting a 9–6–1 record in 16 games before he was elevated to remain with the San Diego Gulls of the AHL, going 10–5–4 with one shutout. On June 30, 2017, Boyle was re-signed to a one-year contract extension to continue with the Ducks.

Boyle continued his progression in the 2017–18 season, playing the full season with the Gulls of the AHL. In collecting a 29–18–6 record with two shutouts, Boyle ranked 10th among AHL goaltenders in SV% (.921), while finishing second among rookies in SV%, fifth in wins (19) and sixth in GAA (2.66). Boyle established a San Diego Gulls franchise record last season in games played with 35 and matched a club record for single-season wins.

On June 19, 2018, Boyle signed a two-year, two-way contract extension with the Ducks. During the 2018–19 season, Boyle received his first recall to the NHL on November 19, 2018, however returned to the Gulls without playing. With the slumping Ducks suffering injuries to established duo Ryan Miller and John Gibson, Boyle was recalled to serve as backup to Chad Johnson. On February 9, 2019, Boyle made his NHL debut with the Ducks, coming in relief of Johnson after the first period. In 40 minutes, he stopped 19 of 21 shots in a 6–2 defeat to the Philadelphia Flyers. On February 13, Boyle made his first career NHL start where he stopped 35 shots from the Vancouver Canucks for his first career shutout.

On October 9, 2020, Boyle signed a one-year, two-way contract with the Detroit Red Wings. In his lone season within the Red Wings' organization, he was assigned to their AHL affiliate, the Grand Rapids Griffins. In 12 appearances in the pandemic shortened 2020–21 season, he posted a 7–3–1 record.

On August 20, 2021, Boyle signed his first European contract by agreeing to a one-year deal with Italian based HC Bolzano of the ICE Hockey League.

On August 5, 2022, Boyle announced his retirement from professional hockey through Instagram.

== Career statistics ==
			Regular season									Playoffs
Season	Team	League	GP	W	L	OT	MIN	GA	SO	GAA	SV%	GP	W	L	MIN	GA	SO	GAA	SV%
2008–09	New Jersey Rockets	AtJHL	1	—	—	—	—	—	—	2.00	.938	—	—	—	—	—	—	—	—
2008–09	Tri-City Storm	USHL	1	0	1	0	60	4	0	4.00	.879	—	—	—	—	—	—	—	—
2009–10	New Jersey Rockets	AtJHL	19	—	—	—	—	—	—	2.71	.913	4	—	—	—	—	—	3.00	.876
2010–11	Westside Warriors	BCHL	39	20	16	1	2205	111	1	3.02	.901	12	6	6	700	35	1	3.00	.907
2011–12	UMass-Amherst	HE	21	8	7	4	1140	57	0	3.00	.895	—	—	—	—	—	—	—	—
2012–13	UMass-Amherst	HE	20	8	10	2	1185	54	1	2.73	.897	—	—	—	—	—	—	—	—
2014–15	UMass-Lowell	HE	34	18	9	6	1962	79	3	2.42	.915	—	—	—	—	—	—	—	—
2015–16	UMass-Lowell	HE	39	24	10	5	2364	72	7	1.83	.934	—	—	—	—	—	—	—	—
2016–17	Utah Grizzlies	ECHL	16	9	6	1	967	44	0	2.73	.908	5	1	4	289	16	0	3.32	.900
2016–17	San Diego Gulls	AHL	19	10	5	4	1111	42	1	2.27	.924	—	—	—	—	—	—	—	—
2017–18	San Diego Gulls	AHL	35	19	13	2	2052	91	1	2.66	.921	—	—	—	—	—	—	—	—
2018–19	San Diego Gulls	AHL	43	24	13	2	2362	114	0	2.90	.907	7	3	3	374	14	1	2.25	.920
2018–19	Anaheim Ducks	NHL	5	1	3	0	277	10	1	2.17	.928	—	—	—	—	—	—	—	—
2019–20	San Diego Gulls	AHL	20	9	7	2	1127	53	0	2.82	.911	—	—	—	—	—	—	—	—
2020–21	Grand Rapids Griffins	AHL	12	7	3	1	686	33	0	2.89	.883	—	—	—	—	—	—	—	—
2021–22	HC Bozen	ICE	26	13	11	1	1,566	77	0	2.95	.905	—	—	—	—	—	—	—	—
NHL totals			5	1	3	0	277	10	1	2.17	.928	—	—	—	—	—	—	—	—

== Awards and honors ==
Award	Year
BCHL
All-Rookie Team	2011
College
HE Second All-Star Team	2016
HE All-Tournament Team	2016
HE Tournament MVP	2016
HE Goaltender of the Year	2016
HE Player of the Year	2016
New England D1 All-Stars	2016
AHL
All-Star Game	2019

Awards and achievements
Preceded by Jack Eichel	Hockey East Player of the Year; 2015–16; With: Thatcher Demko	Succeeded by Zach Aston-Reese
Preceded by Jack Eichel	Hockey East Three-Stars Award; 2015–16	Succeeded by Anders Bjork; Clayton Keller; Tyler Kelleher
Preceded by Jon Gillies	Hockey East Goaltending Champion; 2015–16	Succeeded by Collin Delia
