= Nolan Stevens =

American ice hockey player (born 1996)

- Born: July 22, 1996 (age 30) Brantford, Ontario, CAN
- Height: 6 ft 3 in (191 cm)
- Weight: 191 lb (87 kg; 13 st 9 lb)
- Position: Left wing
- Shoots: Left
- Allsv team Former teams: Södertälje SK; San Antonio Rampage; Utica Comets; Springfield Thunderbirds; Iowa Wild; Grand Rapids Griffins
- NHL draft: 125th overall, 2016 NHL Draft
- Playing career: 2018–present

Nolan Kenneth Stevens (born July 22, 1996) is a professional ice hockey player who currently plays for Södertälje SK of the HockeyAllsvenskan (Allsv). He previously has played most of his career in the American Hockey League (AHL). He was drafted 125th overall by the St. Louis Blues in the 2016 NHL Draft.

== Playing career ==
Born in Brantford, Ontario, he was raised in Sea Isle City, New Jersey. He eventually played for Northeastern University in 2014. In his rookie year, he scored 3 goals and 9 assists in 26 games. He was selected 125th overall in the 2016 NHL Draft by the St. Louis Blues. After his time in Northeastern, he signed a 2 year Entry-level contract with the Blues, playing for their affiliate team.

On December 29, 2021, he was traded to the Minnesota Wild in exchange for ice hockey forward, William Bitten.

On July 3rd, 2023, he signed a one-year deal with the Detroit Red Wings.

== Personal life ==
His father, John Stevens was also a professional hockey player and is a current assistant coach for the Vegas Golden Knights of the National Hockey League (NHL). Also, his older brother, John Jr. is also a former professional hockey player who had previous contracts with the New York Islanders, Vancouver Canucks, and more teams. They also grew up playing with Johnny Gaudreau and his brother, Matty.

== Career statistics ==
			Regular season					Playoffs
Season	Team	League	GP	G	A	Pts	PIM	GP	G	A	Pts	PIM
2014-15	Northeastern Univ.	NCAA	36	3	9	12	8	—	—	—	—	—
2015-16	Northeastern Univ.	NCAA	41	20	22	42	10	—	—	—	—	—
2016-17	Northeastern Univ.	NCAA	17	10	12	22	12	—	—	—	—	—
2017-18	Northeastern Univ.	NCAA	38	24	18	42	50	—	—	—	—	—
2018-19	San Antonio Rampage	AHL	59	9	9	18	12	—	—	—	—	—
2019-20	San Antonio Rampage	AHL	50	9	22	31	14	—	—	—	—	—
2020-21	Utica Comets	AHL	27	6	12	18	8	—	—	—	—	—
2021-22	Springfield Thunderbirds	AHL	20	3	9	12	10	—	—	—	—	—
2021-22	Iowa Wild	AHL	33	3	4	7	16	—	—	—	—	—
2022-23	Utica Comets	AHL	48	15	18	33	17	—	—	—	—	—
2023-24	Grand Rapids Griffins	AHL	31	3	8	11	20	—	—	—	—	—
2023-24	Utica Comets	AHL	25	2	6	8	14	—	—	—	—	—
2024-25	Södertälje SK	Allsv	49	22	30	52	55	—	—	—	—	—
2025-26	Leksands IF	SHL	49	7	11	18	16	—	—	—	—	—
AHL totals			293	50	88	138	111	—	—	—	—	—
