= Thatcher Demko =

American ice hockey player (born 1995)

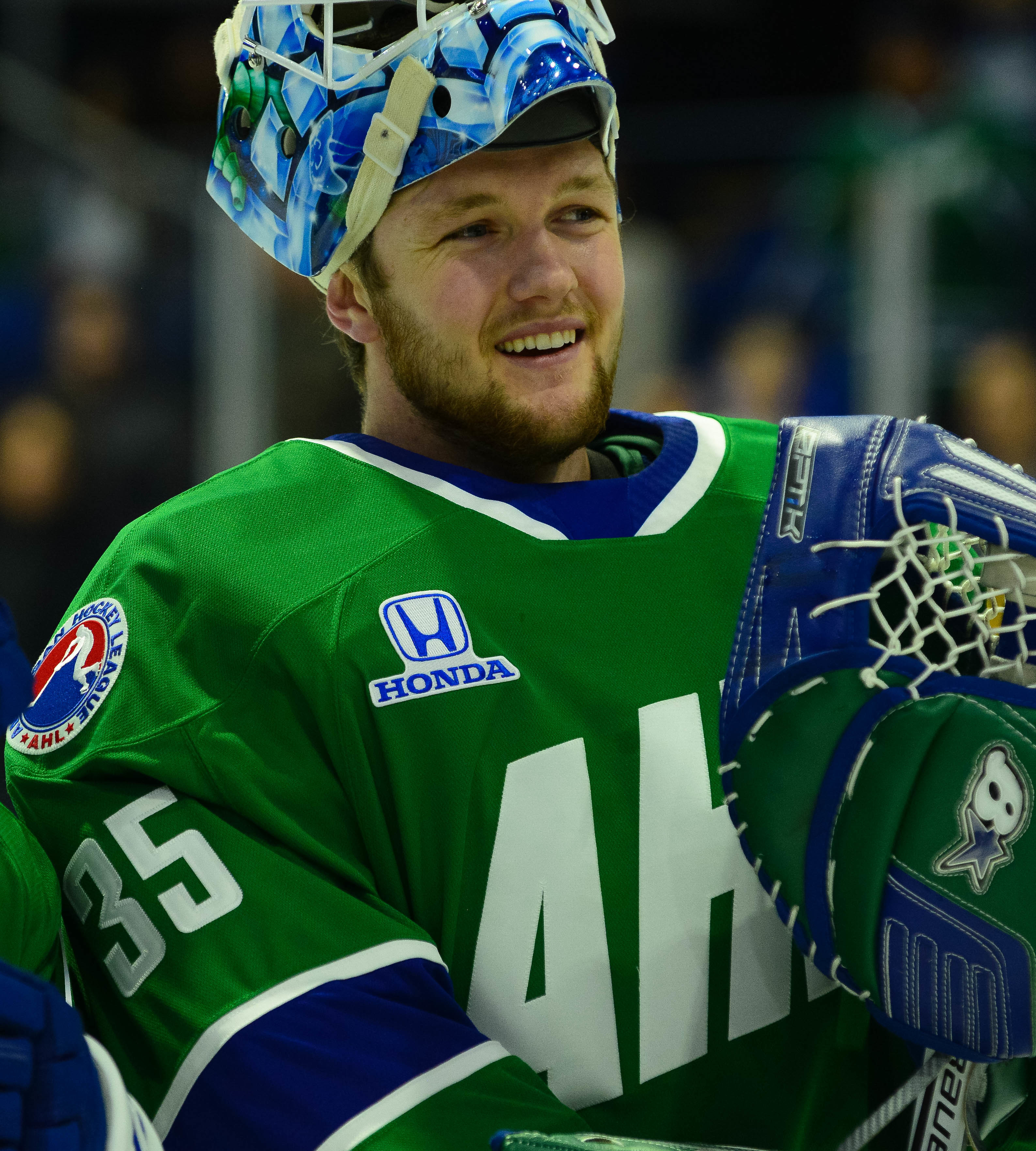
- Demko with the Utica Comets in 2018
- Born: December 8, 1995 (age 30) San Diego, California, U.S.
- Height: 6 ft 4 in (193 cm)
- Weight: 192 lb (87 kg; 13 st 10 lb)
- Position: Goaltender
- Catches: Left
- NHL team: Vancouver Canucks
- National team: United States
- NHL draft: 36th overall, 2014; Vancouver Canucks
- Playing career: 2016–present

Thatcher Douglas Demko (born December 8, 1995) is an American professional ice hockey player who is a goaltender for the Vancouver Canucks of the National Hockey League (NHL). Demko was selected by the Canucks in the second round (36th overall) of the 2014 NHL entry draft.

== Playing career ==
=== College and minor leagues ===
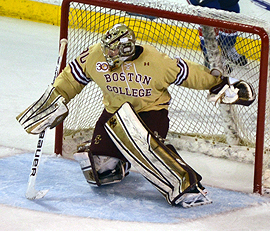
Demko playing for Boston College (2014)

Demko began playing ice hockey in San Diego at the age of 4. In 2010, he moved to Los Angeles to play youth hockey for the LA Junior Kings. In the 2011–12 season, Demko played with the Omaha Lancers of the United States Hockey League (USHL). He joined the U.S. National Development Team during the 2012–13 season, winning silver medal with the team at the 2012 World U-17 Hockey Challenge.

Demko played for the Boston College Eagles of Hockey East from 2013–2016, serving as the primary starting goaltender for all three seasons. During his college career, he earned an impressive 62–26–10 record, with a .928 save percentage, 2.08 goals allowed average and 13 shutouts. At the time of leaving, he held the school's second best career GAA (2.08), second most wins (62), and third most career shutouts (13). With 10 shutouts in his junior season, he set the school's single-season record and came close to the NCAA record, only second behind Greg Gardner's (Niagara) mark of 12 in 1999–2000.

During his freshman season, he earned a spot on the conference All-Rookie team and won the league's statistical goaltending award for lowest GAA (1.35) in conference play. He also helped the Eagles earn their 5th consecutive title in the prestigious Beanpot tournament played between Boston's elite hockey universities. During the postseason, the Eagles reached the Frozen Four but fell to Union in the semi-final.

After the conclusion of his freshman year, Demko was ranked number 1 by the NHL Central Scouting Bureau on their final list of the top draft-eligible North American goaltenders leading into the 2014 NHL entry draft. He would be picked by the Vancouver Canucks, 36th overall in the 2nd round.

In April 2015, during the offseason following his sophomore year, Demko underwent surgery on both hips at New York City's Hospital for Special Surgery. For almost four years, he had dealt with immense pain from tears in his acetabular labrums, a ring of cartilage at the hips.

In his junior season, Demko shone with a staggering 27–8–4 record, with a 1.88 GAA and .935 save percentage. He helped the Eagles once again reach the Frozen Four, but again fell in the semi-final, this time to Quinnipiac. For his efforts, he was named the recipient of the Mike Richter Award, given to the most outstanding goaltender in NCAA men's ice hockey, and was also a top 3 finalist for the Hobey Baker Award, given to the best overall player in the NCAA. He also earned a number of other accolades, making the AHCA All-American Second Team, the Hockey East First All-Star team, and finally was named Co-Player of the Year by Hockey East, alongside UMass Lowell's goaltender Kevin Boyle

Forgoing his senior year at Boston College, Demko signed a three-year entry-level contract with the Canucks on April 20, 2016.

The Canucks assigned Demko to their American Hockey League (AHL) affiliate, the Utica Comets for the 2016–17 season. He would record his first win on November 12, 2016, in a 3–2 overtime victory over the Hartford Wolf Pack. Demko was recalled on December 10, due to Ryan Miller's injury; but was reassigned to the Comets on December 13, without playing a game. On March 4, 2017, Demko earned his first shutout, helping the Comets defeat the Albany Devils by a score of 3–0.

=== Professional ===
==== Vancouver Canucks ====
On March 31, 2018, Demko made his NHL debut for the Canucks, stopping 26 shots en route to a 5–4 overtime victory over the Columbus Blue Jackets. Demko would spend the rest of the season with the Utica Comets (AHL).

On January 2, 2019, the Canucks announced they had dealt backup goaltender Anders Nilsson to the Ottawa Senators, opening up a full-time backup position for Demko. Demko, who had spent most of the season recovering from a concussion and playing in the AHL, would finish the season on the Canucks roster for the first time.

On April 24, 2019, the Canucks signed Demko to a two-year, $2.1 million contract extension. In the 2019-20 season that followed, Demko would continue playing the backup for the majority of the regular season, until a serious knee injury sidelined the incumbent Jacob Markstrom for the next month. Beginning on February 25, 2020 against the Montreal Canadiens, Demko would start 7 of the final 8 games of the season, going 3–4–0 and posting a .906 save percentage. His most impressive game in that stretch came on March 10, 2020, a 45-save shootout win over the New York Islanders, which happened to be the last Canucks game before the 2019–20 season was cut short.

On September 1, 2020, Demko would make his first NHL playoff start in relief of the injured Markstrom. With the Canucks facing elimination and down 3–1 in the Western Conference Second Round to the Vegas Golden Knights, Demko allowed just 1 goal on 43 shots in a 2–1 win over Vegas. In doing so, he became the first rookie goaltender since José Théodore in 1997 to win an elimination game in his playoff debut. On September 3, 2020, he made 48 stops and recorded his first career playoff shutout in a 4–0 victory over Vegas, becoming the first rookie goaltender to win his first two career playoff starts while facing elimination since Jacques Plante in 1953. The 48-save shutout in game 6 of the series would set an NHL record for most saves in a playoff shutout by a rookie, as well as the most saves by a goaltender in a game that ended in regulation. In his first three playoff starts, Demko made 123 stops on 125 shots for a remarkable .984 save percentage, nearly leading the Canucks to a 7 game series upset of the top seeded Golden Knights. Demko was named the first star for all three of the games he played.

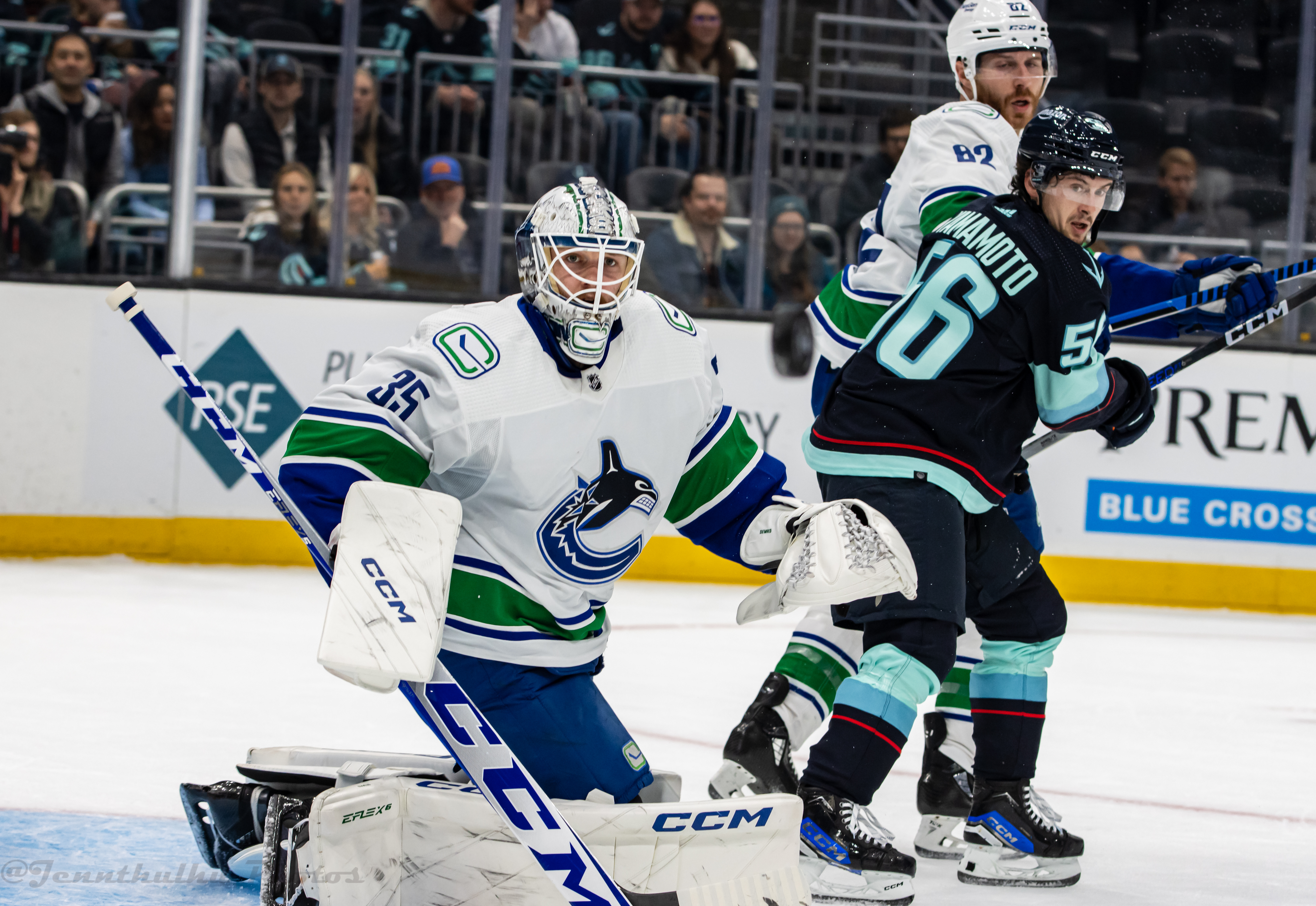
Demko with the Vancouver Canucks in 2023.

On March 1, 2021, Demko earned his first career regular season shutout in a 4–0 victory over the Winnipeg Jets. The shutout would be the first game in an 8–1–0 run by Demko to start the month of March, in which he posted a .950 save percentage and a 1.74 goals against average. The run would establish Demko's position as the number 1 in Vancouver's crease going forward. On March 31, Demko signed a five-year, $25 million contract extension with the Canucks.

On January 2, 2022, Demko was named the NHL Third Star of the Month for December 2021 after posting a 7–1–0 record, 1.72 goals-against average, and .946 save percentage during the month. On January 13, Demko was named an NHL All-Star for the first time in his career.

Demko was named a Vezina Trophy finalist for the first time in his career for the 2023–24 season.

On April 21, 2024, during a playoff game against Nashville Predators, Demko injured his popliteus muscle. After a seven-month rehabilitation, he played his first game of the 2024–25 season on December 10, 2024. After completing 17 games for the Canucks, he picked up another injury in February 2025, which sidelined him for another 40 days. He finished the season by playing six more games at the end of March and in early April.

On July 1, 2025, Demko signed a three-year contract extension that would start in the 2026–27 season, with an $8.5 million annual average value and a no-move clause.

In the 2025–26 season, Demko had an 8–10–1 record, a 2.91 goals-against average, and a .897 save percentage through 20 games. On January 27, 2026, the Canucks announced Demko would miss the remainder of the season due to hip surgery.

== International play ==
Demko won a silver medal as a member of the U.S. national under-18 team at the 2013 IIHF World U18 Championships. He also was a member of the U.S. national junior team at the 2014 IIHF World Junior Championship, and was a backup to fellow Hockey East goaltender Jon Gillies of Providence.

The following year, at the 2015 IIHF World Junior Championship, Demko was the starting goaltender, starting in 7 of 8 games. Despite the team's elimination in the quarterfinals, Demko finished third in the tournament among goaltenders with a 1.74 GAA and .938 save percentage.

Demko would get his first appearance at a senior men's international tournament at the 2019 IIHF World Championship as a backup to Cory Schneider. Demko started in 2 games against Great Britain and France respectively and finished the tournament with a 2–0–0 record.

== Personal life ==
Demko and his wife Lexie have one child together.

== Career statistics ==
=== Regular season and playoffs ===
			Regular season									Playoffs
Season	Team	League	GP	W	L	OTL	MIN	GA	SO	GAA	SV%	GP	W	L	MIN	GA	SO	GAA	SV%
2011–12	Omaha Lancers	USHL	15	9	3	0	754	36	1	2.87	.899	—	—	—	—	—	—	—	—
2012–13	US National Development Team	USHL	19	15	3	0	1,059	39	1	2.21	.902	—	—	—	—	—	—	—	—
2013–14	Boston College	HE	24	16	5	3	1,446	54	2	2.24	.919	—	—	—	—	—	—	—	—
2014–15	Boston College	HE	35	19	13	3	2,107	77	1	2.19	.925	—	—	—	—	—	—	—	—
2015–16	Boston College	HE	39	27	8	4	2,362	74	10	1.88	.935	—	—	—	—	—	—	—	—
2016–17	Utica Comets	AHL	45	22	17	4	2,555	114	2	2.68	.907	—	—	—	—	—	—	—	—
2017–18	Utica Comets	AHL	46	25	13	7	2,781	113	1	2.44	.922	5	2	3	312	14	0	2.69	.927
2017–18	Vancouver Canucks	NHL	1	1	0	0	61	4	0	3.93	.867	—	—	—	—	—	—	—	—
2018–19	Utica Comets	AHL	16	8	5	1	860	37	0	2.58	.911	—	—	—	—	—	—	—	—
2018–19	Vancouver Canucks	NHL	9	4	3	1	534	25	0	2.81	.913	—	—	—	—	—	—	—	—
2019–20	Vancouver Canucks	NHL	27	13	10	2	1,529	78	0	3.06	.905	4	2	1	186	2	1	0.64	.985
2020–21	Vancouver Canucks	NHL	35	16	18	1	2,087	99	1	2.85	.915	—	—	—	—	—	—	—	—
2021–22	Vancouver Canucks	NHL	64	33	22	7	3,701	168	1	2.72	.915	—	—	—	—	—	—	—	—
2022–23	Vancouver Canucks	NHL	32	14	14	4	1,879	99	1	3.16	.901	—	—	—	—	—	—	—	—
2023–24	Vancouver Canucks	NHL	51	35	14	2	3,016	123	5	2.45	.918	1	1	0	60	2	0	2.00	.917
2024–25	Vancouver Canucks	NHL	23	10	8	3	1,302	63	1	2.90	.889	—	—	—	—	—	—	—	—
2025–26	Vancouver Canucks	NHL	20	8	10	1	1,115	54	1	2.90	.897	—	—	—	—	—	—	—	—
NHL totals			262	134	99	21	15,224	713	10	2.81	.909	5	3	1	246	4	1	0.97	.974

=== International ===
Year	Team	Event	GP	W	L	T	MIN	GA	SO	GAA	SV%
2013	United States	U18	7	3	3	0	428	16	1	2.24	.899
2015	United States	WJC	4	1	1	0	242	7	1	1.74	.939
2019	United States	WC	2	2	0	0	120	4	0	2.00	.920
Junior totals			11	4	4	0	670	23	2	2.06	.916
Senior totals			2	2	0	0	120	4	0	2.00	.920

== Awards and honors ==
Award	Year	Ref
College
Mike Richter Award	2015–16	
NHL
NHL All-Star Game	2022, 2024	
NHL Second All-Star Team	2024	
Vancouver Canucks
Cyclone Taylor Trophy	2022	

Awards and achievements
Preceded by Zane McIntyre	Mike Richter Award; 2015–16	Succeeded by Tanner Jaillet
Preceded by Jack Eichel	Hockey East Player of the Year; 2015–16; With: Kevin Boyle	Succeeded by Zach Aston-Reese
Preceded by Connor Hellebuyck	Hockey East Goaltending Champion; 2013–14	Succeeded by Jon Gillies
