= Boston College Eagles men's ice hockey statistical leaders =

The Boston College Eagles men's ice hockey statistical leaders are individual statistical leaders of the Boston College Eagles men's ice hockey program in various categories, including goals, assists, points, and saves. Within those areas, the lists identify single-game, single-season, and career leaders. The Eagles represent Boston College in the NCAA's Hockey East.

Boston College began competing in intercollegiate ice hockey in 1917. These lists are updated through the end of the 2022–23 season.

== Goals ==
Career
Rk	Player	Goals	Seasons
1	Brian Gionta	123	1997–98 1998–99 1999–00 2000–01
2	David Emma	112	1987–88 1988–89 1989–90 1990–91
3	Joe Mullen	110	1975–76 1976–77 1977–78 1978–79
4	Scott Harlow	105	1982–83 1983–84 1984–85 1985–86
5	Richie Smith	94	1972–73 1973–74 1974–75 1975–76
6	Tony Voce	90	2000–01 2001–02 2002–03 2003–04
7	Jeff Farkas	88	1996–97 1997–98 1998–99 1999–00
8	Ed Kenty	79	1970–71 1971–72 1972–73
9	Blake Bellefeuille	78	1996–97 1997–98 1998–99 1999–00
	Paul Barrett	78	1974–75 1975–76 1976–77 1977–78
	Bob Sweeney	78	1982–83 1983–84 1984–85 1985–86
	Johnny Gaudreau	78	2011–12 2012–13 2013–14

Season
Rk	Player	Goals	Season
1	David Emma	38	1989–90
	Scott Harlow	38	1985–86
	Cutter Gauthier	38	2023–24
4	Doug Brown	37	1984–85
5	Johnny Gaudreau	36	2013–14
6	David Emma	35	1990–91
	Kevin Stevens	35	1986–87
	Nathan Gerbe	35	2007–08
9	Scott Harlow	34	1984–85
	Joe Mullen	34	1977–78
	Jack Mulhern	34	1948–49
	Chris Collins	34	2005–06

Single Game
Rk	Player	Goals	Season	Opponent
1	John Pryor	6	1939–40	Cornell

== Assists ==
Career
Rk	Player	Assists	Seasons
1	Mike Mottau	130	1996–97 1997–98 1998–99 1999–00
2	David Emma	127	1987–88 1988–89 1989–90 1990–91
3	Dan Shea	124	1984–85 1985–86 1986–87 1987–88
4	Scott Harlow	118	1982–83 1983–84 1984–85 1985–86
5	Ben Eaves	116	2000–01 2001–02 2002–03 2003–04
6	Tim Sheehy	111	1967–68 1968–69 1969–70
	Tom Martin	111	1959–60 1960–61
8	Brian Gionta	109	1997–98 1998–99 1999–00 2000–01
9	Bob Ferriter	108	1973–74 1974–75 1975–76 1976–77
	Brian Gibbons	108	2007–08 2008–09 2009–10 2010–11

Season
Rk	Player	Assists	Season
1	Craig Janney	55	1986–87
2	David Emma	46	1990–91
	William Smith	46	2023–24
4	Tom Mellor	45	1972–73
	Dan Shea	45	1986–87
6	Dominic Campedelli	44	1984–85
	Ken Hodge	44	1984–85
	Tim Sweeney	44	1988–89
	Johnny Gaudreau	44	2013–14
10	Phil Dyer	43	1964–65

Single Game
Rk	Player	Assists	Season	Opponent
1	Jack Mulhern	7	1948–49	Ft. Devens

== Points ==
Career
Rk	Player	Points	Seasons
1	David Emma	239	1987–88 1988–89 1989–90 1990–91
2	Brian Gionta	232	1997–98 1998–99 1999–00 2000–01
3	Scott Harlow	223	1982–83 1983–84 1984–85 1985–86
4	Joe Mullen	212	1975–76 1976–77 1977–78 1978–79
5	Richie Smith	198	1972–73 1973–74 1974–75 1975–76
6	Dan Shea	190	1984–85 1985–86 1986–87 1987–88
	Jeff Farkas	190	1996–97 1997–98 1998–99 1999–00
8	Tim Sheehy	185	1967–68 1968–69 1969–70
9	Paul Barrett	177	1974–75 1975–76 1976–77 1977–78
10	Johnny Gaudreau	175	2011–12 2012–13 2013–14

Season
Rk	Player	Points	Season
1	Craig Janney	83	1986–87
2	David Emma	81	1990–91
3	Johnny Gaudreau	80	2013–14
4	Scott Harlow	79	1985–86
5	Billy Daley	74	1960–61
6	Tim Sweeney	73	1988–89
	Marty Reasoner	73	1997–98
8	David Emma	72	1989–90
	Scott Harlow	72	1984–85
10	William Smith	71	2023–24

Single Game
Rk	Player	Points	Season	Opponent
1	Ray Chaisson	11	1939–40	Cornell
	John Pryor	11	1939–40	Cornell
3	Jack Mulhern	10	1948–49	Ft. Devens

== Saves ==
Career
Rk	Player	Saves	Seasons
1	John Muse	3,696	2007–08 2008–09 2009–10 2010–11
2	Greg Taylor	3,605	1993–94 1994–95 1995–96 1996–97
3	Scott Clemmensen	3,234	1997–98 1998–99 1999–00 2000–01
4	Scott Gordon	3,055	1982–83 1983–84 1984–85 1985–86
5	Paul Skidmore	2,761	1975–76 1976–77 1977–78 1978–79

Season
Rk	Player	Saves	Season
1	John Muse	1,171	2007–08
2	Cory Schneider	1,111	2006–07
3	Cory Schneider	1,088	2005–06
4	Thatcher Demko	1,068	2015–16
5	Scott Gordon	1,048	1984–85
6	Jacob Fowler	1,038	2023–24
7	Greg Taylor	1,024	1993–94
8	Parker Milner	999	2012–13
9	John Muse	961	2008–09
10	Greg Taylor	957	1995–96

Single Game
Rk	Player	Saves	Season	Opponent
1	Tim Ready	82	1935–36	Princeton
2	Al Pitts	63	1957–58	Boston University
3	Greg Taylor	61	1995–96	Boston University
	Al Pitts	61	1957–58	Boston University
	Tim Ready	61	1938–39	Boston University
