= 2000–01 Boston College Eagles men's ice hockey season =

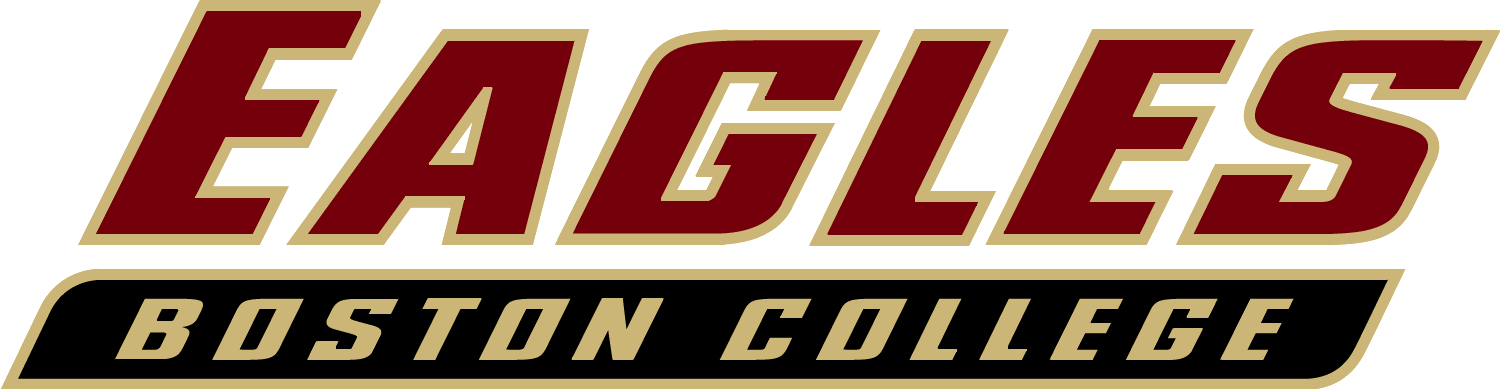

NCAA Division I National Champion Maverick Stampede, champion Beanpot, champion Hockey East, champion Hockey East Tournament, champion NCAA Tournament, champion
- Conference: 1st Hockey East
- Home ice: Conte Forum

Rankings
- USCHO: 2
- USA Today: 1

Record
- Overall: 33–8–2
- Conference: 17–5–2
- Home: 12–3–1
- Road: 12–4–1
- Neutral: 9–1–0

Coaches and captains
- Head coach: Jerry York
- Assistant coaches: Jim Logue; Scott Paluch; Mike Cavanaugh
- Captain: Brian Gionta
- Alternate captain(s): Bobby Allen; Mike Lephart

The 2000–01 Boston College Eagles men's ice hockey season was the 79th season of play for the program. They represent Boston College in the 2000–01 NCAA Division I men's ice hockey season and for the 17th season in Hockey East. The Eagles were coached by Jerry York, in his 7th season, and played their home games at the Conte Forum.

== Season ==
=== Milestone ===
Entering the season, head coach Jerry York needed just seven wins to reach 600 for his career. Early on, the team lived up to their pre-season ranking, winning four road games before heading into a showdown with Wisconsin. In a battle between the top two ranked programs, BC entered the third period with a lead, only to see the Badgers score twice to take the match. After a poor start from backup netminder Tim Kelleher, Scott Clemmensen finished the following game, allowing BC to get back on track. The next week, the Eagles returned to type, winning both games, and gave York his milestone.

=== Settling in ===
After a second consecutive poor showing from their backup, on November 7, BC turned over the net to Clemmenson for most of the rest of the season and got stellar play from the senior. In the team's 7–2 win over Merrimack, captain Brian Gionta set the program record for the fastest two goals when he scored 10 seconds apart in the third period. In the same game he recorded his 8th-career hat-trick, tying the program record, and hit 100 goals for his career, becoming the 4th player in program history to reach that mark. BC ended the first half of their season by taking down #11 Maine and establishing themselves as the #2 team in the nation, just behind Michigan State.

=== Missed opportunity ===
BC began the second half of the regular season with its second 2-vs-1 matchup. Just like the first time, the Eagles were unable to overcome the higher-seeded team and fell to MSU in the Great Lakes Invitational semifinal. Boston College retained its ranking after recovering with a win over #4 Michigan in the consolation game. A further loss to arch-rival Boston University dropped the team one spot but four consecutive wins over ranked teams had them back in the #2 spot before long. In the last game in January, Gionta again set new program records. By scoring 5 goals in the first, he set a Hockey East record for the most goals in one period. He tied the program record of 112 career goals while setting a new benchmark of 9 career hat-tricks. The game also marked the first season sweep of Maine since 1990.

=== Beanpot champions ===
After completing the season sweep of Massachusetts–Lowell, BC rode into the Beanpot tied in one poll for the #1 seed. The Eagles dropped Harvard in the semifinal, setting up a showdown with BU a week later. In the interim, however, BC saw its 6-game winning streak ended by Providence. Having lost yet another shot at being the top team in the nation, Boston College took out their frustrations out on the Terriers and won the Beanpot for the first time in seven years. Clemmenson was named tournament MVP.

=== Down the stretch ===
The Eagles split the following weekend against #8 New Hampshire and then were not quite up to par a week later versus Massachusetts. Despite not losing either match, BC dropped to #3 in the polls but rebounded with two wins to end their regular season. Boston College ended atop the Hockey East standings with a 7-point margin. It was the first conference title for the Eagles in a decade.

=== Hockey East tournament ===
BC opened their postseason with Scott Clemmensen earning the program record 13th and final shutout of his college career against Merrimack. He continued his strong play, allowing 1 goal in each of the next two games, and sent BC to their 4th-consecutive conference title game. The team got a tougher fight from Providence, but Tony Voce led the way with two goals and BC won the Hockey East Championship. Despite being held off the scoresheet in the final, Chuck Kobasew was named as the Tournament MVP.

=== NCAA tournament ===
Entering the tournament as the #2 team in the nation, Boston College received the top eastern seed and a bye into the second round. Their first game came against Maine, the team that had knocked them out in 1999, and BC continued their dominance of the Black Bears in '01 with 3–1 victory. Entering their 4th-consecutive Frozen Four, the Eagles were faced with Michigan, the squad that had defeated them for the title in 1998, for the second time on the year. The seniors were able to get their revenge three-years in the making and took the game 4–2.

BC reached the championship game for the second straight season and the third time in four years. The only team left in their path to the title was defending champion, North Dakota. The two teams fought to a scoreless draw after one period and BC took over in the second, beginning with a power play goal from Kobasew. Senior Mike Lephart got a second goal three minutes later and Scott Clemmensen kept UND off the board until late in the game. After BC took a penalty for too many men with less than 5 minutes to play, the Fighting Sioux pulled their goaltender and cut the lead in half. Wes Dorey ted the game with under a minute before the buzzer and sent the championship into overtime. Despite the sudden change in fortune, BC found their nerve in the extra session and sent 4 shots on goal in less than 5 minutes. The final of which, coming from the stick of Krys Kolanos, found the back of the net and game Boston College its first national championship in 52 years. BC also became just the 3rd national champion that played more games on the road than at home (1978 Boston University, 1994 Lake Superior State)

Kobasew was named Tournament MOP while Clemmensen set the NCAA record for most game played by a goaltender in a Frozen Four with seven.

== Departures ==
Player	Position	Nationality	Cause
Blake Bellefeuille	Forward	United States	Graduation (signed with Columbus Blue Jackets)
Kevin Caulfield	Forward	United States	Graduation (signed with Wheeling Nailers)
Anthony D'Arpino	Forward	United States	Returned to juniors mid-season
Jeff Farkas	Forward	United States	Graduation (signed with Toronto Maple Leafs)
Tony Hutchins	Forward	United States	Graduation (retired)
Paul Kelly	Forward	United States	Returned to juniors (Tri-City Storm)
Mike Mottau	Defenseman	United States	Graduation (signed with New York Rangers)
Jeremy Wilson	Forward	United States	Returned to juniors (Cedar Rapids RoughRiders)

== Recruiting ==
Player	Position	Nationality	Age	Notes
Justin Dziama	Forward	United States	20	Natick, MA; selected 242nd overall in 1999
Ben Eaves	Forward	United States	18	Minneapolis, MN
J. D. Forrest	Defenseman	United States	19	Auburn, NY; selected 181st overall in 2000
Ty Hennes	Forward	United States	20	Kent, WA
Chuck Kobasew	Forward	Canada	18	Calgary, AB
Brett Peterson	Defenseman	United States	18	Northborough, MA
Joe Schuman	Defenseman	United States	18	Bloomington, MN
Tony Voce	Forward	United States	19	Philadelphia, PA

== Roster ==
No.	Nat.	Player	Class	Pos	Height	Weight	DoB	Hometown	Previous team	NHL rights
1		Tim Kelleher	Sophomore	G	6' 0" (1.83 m)	170 lb (77 kg)	1980-05-25	Belmont, Massachusetts	Saint Sebastian's School (US-Prep)	—
2		Bobby Allen (A)	Senior	D	6' 0" (1.83 m)	183 lb (83 kg)	1978-11-14	Weymouth, Massachusetts	Cushing Academy (US-Prep)	BOS, 52nd overall 1998
4		Brooks Orpik	Junior	D	6' 2" (1.88 m)	220 lb (100 kg)	1980-09-26	San Francisco, California	Thayer Academy (US-Prep)	PIT, 18th overall 2000
5		Bill Cass	Sophomore	D	5' 11" (1.8 m)	190 lb (86 kg)	1980-09-30	Boston, Massachusetts	USNTDP (USHL)	ANA, 153rd overall 2000
6		Marty Hughes	Senior	D	5' 10" (1.78 m)	185 lb (84 kg)	1978-10-06	Hicksville, New York		—
7		Rob Scuderi	Senior	D	6' 1" (1.85 m)	212 lb (96 kg)	1978-12-30	Hicksville, New York	New York Apple Core (EJHL)	PIT, 134th overall 1998
8		Anthony D'Arpino	Sophomore	D	6' 1" (1.85 m)	200 lb (91 kg)	1979-11-07	Fort Saskatchewan, Alberta	Fort Saskatchewan Traders (AJHL)	NJD, 42nd overall 1999
10		Jeff Giuliano	Junior	F	5' 9" (1.75 m)	205 lb (93 kg)	1979-06-20	Nashua, New Hampshire	St. Paul's School (US-Prep)	—
11		Krys Kolanos	Sophomore	F	6' 3" (1.91 m)	205 lb (93 kg)	1981-07-27	Calgary, Alberta	Calgary Royals (AJHL)	PHO, 19th overall 2000
12		Brian Gionta (C)	Senior	F	5' 7" (1.7 m)	179 lb (81 kg)	1979-01-18	Rochester, New York	Niagara Scenic (EJHL)	NJD, 82nd overall 1998
13		Tony Voce	Freshman	F	5' 9" (1.75 m)	190 lb (86 kg)	1980-10-30	Philadelphia, Pennsylvania		—
14		Ty Hennes	Freshman	F	5' 9" (1.75 m)	176 lb (80 kg)	1979-11-07	Kent, Washington	Omaha Lancers (USHL)	—
15		Ales Dolinar	Junior	F	5' 10" (1.78 m)	181 lb (82 kg)	1979-04-23	East Northport, New York		—
17		A. J. Walker	Sophomore	F	5' 10" (1.78 m)	187 lb (85 kg)	1980-08-17	Faribault, Minnesota	Shattuck-Saint Mary's (MN-HS)	—
18		Mark McLennan	Senior	F	5' 9" (1.75 m)	176 lb (80 kg)	1978-01-07	Kanata, Ontario	Kanata Valley Lasers (CJHL)	—
19		Chuck Kobasew	Freshman	F	6' 0" (1.83 m)	192 lb (87 kg)	1982-04-17	Osoyoos, British Columbia	Penticton Panthers (BCHL)	—
20		Joe Schuman	Freshman	D	6' 1" (1.85 m)	216 lb (98 kg)	1982-05-25	Bloomington, Minnesota	Dubuque Fighting Saints (USHL)	—
22		Ben Eaves	Freshman	F	5' 8" (1.73 m)	179 lb (81 kg)	1982-03-27	Minneapolis, Minnesota	Shattuck-Saint Mary's (MN-HS)	—
23		J. D. Forrest	Freshman	D	5' 9" (1.75 m)	181 lb (82 kg)	1981-04-15	Auburn, New York	USNTDP (USHL)	CAR, 181st overall 2000
24		Brett Peterson	Freshman	D	5' 11" (1.8 m)	198 lb (90 kg)	1981-10-21	Northborough, Massachusetts		—
25		Justin Dziama	Freshman	F	6' 3" (1.91 m)	220 lb (100 kg)	1980-05-22	Natick, Massachusetts	Walpole Stars (EJHL)	NJD, 242nd overall 1999
27		Mike Lephart (A)	Senior	F	5' 11" (1.8 m)	185 lb (84 kg)	1977-04-03	Niskayuna, New York	Omaha Lancers (USHL)	—
28		Dan Sullivan	Senior	D	6' 3" (1.91 m)	194 lb (88 kg)	1979-03-02	South Windsor, Connecticut		—
29		Tom Egan	Sophomore	G	6' 0" (1.83 m)	190 lb (86 kg)	1980-07-30	Rye, New York	Canterbury School (US-Prep)	—
30		Scott Clemmensen	Senior	G	6' 2" (1.88 m)	201 lb (91 kg)	1977-07-23	Des Moines, Iowa	Des Moines Buccaneers (USHL)	NJD, 215th overall 1997

== Standings ==
2000–01 Hockey East standings
	Conference							Overall					
	GP	W	L	T	PTS	GF	GA	GP	W	L	T	GF	GA
#1 Boston College†*	24	17	5	2	36	103	57	43	33	8	2	175	98
#7 Maine	24	12	7	5	29	70	62	39	20	12	7	116	95
#11 Providence	24	13	8	3	29	76	71	40	22	13	5	131	108
#14 New Hampshire	24	11	8	5	27	61	47	39	21	12	6	122	86
Massachusetts–Lowell	24	10	11	3	23	67	66	38	19	16	3	124	104
Boston University	24	9	12	3	21	66	77	37	14	20	3	109	118
Northeastern	24	7	13	4	18	58	73	36	13	19	4	102	122
Merrimack	24	7	14	3	17	60	86	38	14	20	4	92	121
Massachusetts	24	7	15	2	16	53	81	34	8	22	4	78	123
Championship: Boston College † indicates conference regular season champion * indicates conference tournament champion Final rankings: USA Today/American Hockey Magazine Poll Top 15 Poll

== Schedule and results ==
Date	Time	Opponent^{#}	Rank^{#}	Site	TV	Decision	Result	Record
Exhibition
October 6	7:00 PM	vs. Acadia*	#4	Conte Forum • Chestnut Hill, Massachusetts (Exhibition)			W 6–2	
Maverick Stampede
October 13	6:05 PM	vs. #20 Notre Dame*	#4	Omaha Civic Auditorium • Omaha, Nebraska (Maverick Stampede semifinal)		Clemmensen	W 4–1	1–0–0
October 14	9:05 PM	at #13 Nebraska–Omaha*	#4	Omaha Civic Auditorium • Omaha, Nebraska (Maverick Stampede championship)		Clemmensen	W 5–1	2–0–0
Regular season
October 20	9:35 PM	at Denver*	#3	Magness Arena • Denver, Colorado		Kelleher	W 3–2	3–0–0
October 21	9:05 PM	at Denver*	#3	Magness Arena • Denver, Colorado		Clemmensen	W 3–2	4–0–0
October 27	7:00 PM	vs. #1 Wisconsin*	#2	Conte Forum • Chestnut Hill, Massachusetts		Clemmensen	L 2–3	4–1–0
October 29	7:00 PM	vs. Massachusetts	#2	Conte Forum • Chestnut Hill, Massachusetts		Clemmensen	W 9–5	5–1–0 (1–0–0)
November 3	7:00 PM	vs. #13 Northeastern	#3	Conte Forum • Chestnut Hill, Massachusetts		Clemmensen	W 6–3	6–1–0 (2–0–0)
November 4	7:00 PM	at Massachusetts–Lowell	#3	Tsongas Center • Lowell, Massachusetts		Clemmensen	W 6–1	7–1–0 (3–0–0)
November 7	7:00 PM	vs. Yale*	#2	Conte Forum • Chestnut Hill, Massachusetts		Kelleher	L 3–4	7–2–0
November 10	7:05 PM	at Notre Dame*	#2	Edmund P. Joyce Center • South Bend, Indiana		Clemmensen	W 5–3	8–2–0
November 17	7:00 PM	at Merrimack	#2	J. Thom Lawler Rink • North Andover, Massachusetts		Clemmensen	W 6–1	9–2–0 (4–0–0)
November 18	7:00 PM	vs. #9 New Hampshire	#2	Conte Forum • Chestnut Hill, Massachusetts		Clemmensen	L 1–4	9–3–0 (4–1–0)
November 21	7:00 PM	vs. Merrimack	#4	Conte Forum • Chestnut Hill, Massachusetts		Kelleher	W 7–2	10–3–0 (5–1–0)
November 25	1:00 PM	at Harvard*	#4	Bright-Landry Hockey Center • Boston, Massachusetts		Clemmensen	W 3–2 ^{OT}	11–3–0
December 6	7:00 PM	at Northeastern	#2	Matthews Arena • Boston, Massachusetts		Clemmensen	T 0–0 ^{OT}	11–3–1 (5–1–1)
December 10	7:05 PM	at #11 Maine	#2	Alfond Arena • Orono, Maine		Clemmensen	W 7–2	12–3–1 (6–1–1)
Great Lakes Invitational
December 29	4:05 PM	vs. #1 Michigan State*	#2	Joe Louis Arena • Detroit, Michigan (Great Lakes semifinal)		Clemmensen	L 1–4	12–4–1
December 30	8:05 PM	vs. #4 Michigan*	#2	Joe Louis Arena • Detroit, Michigan (Great Lakes consolation game)		Clemmensen	W 8–5	13–4–1
January 6	7:00 PM	at Boston University	#2	Walter Brown Arena • Boston, Massachusetts		Clemmensen	L 2–3	13–5–1 (6–2–1)
January 7	7:00 PM	vs. Boston University	#2	Conte Forum • Chestnut Hill, Massachusetts		Clemmensen	W 5–2	14–5–1 (7–2–1)
January 12	7:05 PM	at Massachusetts–Lowell	#3	Tsongas Center • Lowell, Massachusetts		Clemmensen	W 2–1	15–5–1 (8–2–1)
January 16	7:00 PM	at Merrimack	#2	J. Thom Lawler Rink • North Andover, Massachusetts		Clemmensen	L 3–6	15–6–1 (8–3–1)
January 19	7:00 PM	vs. #10 Providence	#2	Conte Forum • Chestnut Hill, Massachusetts		Clemmensen	W 4–0	16–6–1 (9–3–1)
January 20	7:00 PM	at #10 Providence	#2	Schneider Arena • Providence, Rhode Island		Clemmensen	W 4–2	17–6–1 (10–3–1)
January 26	7:00 PM	vs. #10 Maine	#2	Conte Forum • Chestnut Hill, Massachusetts		Clemmensen	W 4–1	18–6–1 (11–3–1)
January 27	7:00 PM	vs. #10 Maine	#2	Conte Forum • Chestnut Hill, Massachusetts		Clemmensen	W 7–2	19–6–1 (12–3–1)
February 2	7:00 PM	vs. Massachusetts–Lowell	#2	Conte Forum • Chestnut Hill, Massachusetts		Clemmensen	W 4–3	20–6–1 (13–3–1)
Beanpot
February 5	5:00 PM	vs. Harvard*	#2	FleetCenter • Boston, Massachusetts (Beanpot semifinal)		Clemmensen	W 4–1	21–6–1
February 9	7:00 PM	at #8 Providence	#2	Schneider Arena • Providence, Rhode Island		Clemmensen	L 3–5	21–7–1 (13–4–1)
February 12	8:00 PM	vs. Boston University*	#2	FleetCenter • Boston, Massachusetts (Beanpot championship)		Clemmensen	W 5–3	22–7–1
February 16	7:00 PM	vs. #8 New Hampshire	#2	Conte Forum • Chestnut Hill, Massachusetts		Clemmensen	W 3–2	23–7–1 (14–4–1)
February 18	7:00 PM	at #8 New Hampshire	#2	Whittemore Center • Durham, New Hampshire		Clemmensen	L 0–2	23–8–1 (14–5–1)
February 23	7:00 PM	vs. Massachusetts	#2	Conte Forum • Chestnut Hill, Massachusetts		Clemmensen	T 3–3 ^{OT}	23–8–2 (14–5–2)
February 24	7:00 PM	at Massachusetts	#2	Mullins Center • Amherst, Massachusetts		Clemmensen	W 6–3	24–8–2 (15–5–2)
March 1	7:00 PM	vs. Northeastern	#3	Conte Forum • Chestnut Hill, Massachusetts		Clemmensen	W 6–3	25–8–2 (16–5–2)
March 4	7:00 PM	at Boston University	#3	Walter Brown Arena • Boston, Massachusetts		Kelleher	W 5–1	26–8–2 (17–5–2)
Hockey East Tournament
March 9	7:00 PM	vs. Merrimack*	#2	Conte Forum • Chestnut Hill, Massachusetts (Hockey East quarterfinal game 1)		Clemmensen	W 1–0	27–8–2
March 10	7:0 PM	vs. Merrimack*	#2	Conte Forum • Chestnut Hill, Massachusetts (Hockey East quarterfinal game 2)		Clemmensen	W 5–1	28–8–2
Boston College Won Series 2-0
March 16	5:00 PM	vs. Massachusetts–Lowell*	#2	FleetCenter • Boston, Massachusetts (Hockey East semifinal)		Clemmensen	W 5–1	29–8–2
March 17	7:00 PM	vs. #9 Providence*	#2	FleetCenter • Boston, Massachusetts (Hockey East championship)		Clemmensen	W 5–1	30–8–2
NCAA Tournament
March 24	8:30 PM	vs. #9 Maine*	#2	Centrum Centre • Worcester, Massachusetts (NCAA East Regional semifinal)		Clemmensen	W 3–1	31–8–2
April 5	7:30 PM	vs. #5 Michigan*	#2	Pepsi Arena • Albany, New York (NCAA National semifinal)		Clemmensen	W 4–2	32–8–2
April 7	7:00 PM	vs. #4 North Dakota*	#2	Pepsi Arena • Albany, New York (NCAA National championship)	ESPN	Clemmensen	W 3–2 ^{OT}	33–8–2
*Non-conference game. ^{#}Rankings from USCHO.com Poll. All times are in Eastern Time.

== 2001 national championship ==
April 7	Boston College	3 – 2	OT	North Dakota	Pepsi Arena	Recap

Scoring summary
Period	Team	Goal	Assist(s)	Time	Score
1st	None				
2nd	BC	Chuck Kobasew (27) – PP	Giuliano	25:26	1–0 BC
2nd	BC	Mike Lephart (15)	Forrest and Allen	28:50	2–0 BC
3rd	UND	Tim Skarperud (10) – PP EA	Roche and B. Lundbohm	56:18	2–1 BC
3rd	UND	Wes Dorey (17) – EA	Schneekloth and B. Lundbohm	59:23	2–2
1st Overtime	BC	Krys Kolanos (25) – GW	Kobasew and Voce	64:43	3–2 BC
Penalty summary
Period	Team	Player	Penalty	Time	PIM
1st	UND	David Hale	Cross-Checking	2:49	2:00
1st	BC	Brett Peterson	Interference	8:32	2:00
1st	BC	Krys Kolanos	Goaltender Interference	12:20	2:00
1st	UND	Jason Notermann	Hooking	14:02	2:00
2nd	UND	Aaron Schneekloth	Hooking	24:27	2:00
2nd	BC	Mike Lephart	Holding	32:45	2:00
2nd	BC	Tony Voce	Slashing	34:49	2:00
2nd	UND	Aaron Schneekloth	Tripping	36:10	2:00
3rd	BC	J. D. Forrest	Tripping	40:49	2:00
3rd	UND	Kevin Spiewak	Slashing	41:34	2:00
3rd	UND	David Lundbohm	Hooking	42:51	2:00
3rd	BC	Brooks Orpik	Interference	51:06	2:00
3rd	UND	Tim Skarperud	Slashing	53:31	2:00
3rd	BC	BENCH	Too Many Men	55:07	2:00

Shots by period
Team	1	2	3	OT	T
North Dakota	9	9	16	2	36
Boston College	9	12	7	4	32

Goaltenders
Team	Name	Saves	Goals against	Time on ice
UND	Karl Goehring	29	3	63:26
BC	Scott Clemmensen	34	2	64:43

== Scoring statistics ==
Name	Position	Games	Goals	Assists	Points	PIM
Brian Gionta	RW	43	33	21	54	47
Krys Kolanos	C/LW/RW	41	25	25	50	54
Chuck Kobasew	RW	43	27	22	49	38
Ben Eaves	C/RW	41	13	26	39	12
Jeff Giuliano	LW	43	14	21	35	28
Mike Lephart	LW	42	15	19	34	46
Tony Voce	LW	42	12	14	26	40
Ales Dolinar	F	42	7	16	23	33
J. D. Forrest	D	38	6	17	23	42
Marty Hughes	D	41	5	18	23	41
Bobby Allen	D	42	5	18	23	30
Rob Scuderi	D	43	4	19	23	42
Brooks Orpik	D	40	0	20	20	124
Brett Peterson	D	39	1	6	7	34
Ty Hennes	F	40	2	4	6	10
Bill Cass	D	38	0	6	6	58
Mike McLennan	F	37	3	2	5	4
A. J. Walker	F	20	2	0	2	0
Justin Dziama	LW/RW	28	1	1	2	36
Joe Schuman	D	10	0	1	1	8
Tom Egan	G	1	0	0	0	0
Dan Sullivan	D	2	0	0	0	0
Anthony D'Arpino	D	4	0	0	0	0
Tim Kelleher	G	5	0	0	0	0
Scott Clemmensen	G	39	0	0	0	0
Bench	-	-	-	-	-	10
Total			175	276	451	737

== Goaltending statistics ==
Name	Games	Minutes	Wins	Losses	Ties	Goals against	Saves	Shut outs	SV %	GAA
Jason Endres	1	3	0	0	0	0	1	0	1.000	0.00
Scott Clemmensen	39	2312	30	7	2	82	876	3	.914	2.13
Tim Kelleher	5	269	3	1	0	13	98	0	.883	2.90
Empty Net	-	-	-	-	-	3	-	-	-	-
Total	43		33	8	2	98	975	3	.909	

== Rankings ==
Poll	Week																							
Poll	Pre	1	2	3	4	5	6	7	8	9	10	11	12	13	14	15	16	17	18	19	20	21	22	23 (Final)
USCHO.com	4	3	2	4	2	2	4	3	3	2	2	2	3	2	2	2	2	2	2	3	2	2	2	N/A
USA Today	5	4	3	2	3	1	2	3	3	3	2	2	2	4	2	2	2	1	2	2	2	2	2	1

USCHO did not release a poll in week 23.

== Awards and honors ==
Player	Award	Ref
Chuck Kobasew	NCAA Tournament Most Outstanding Player	
Brian Gionta	AHCA East First Team All-American	
Bobby Allen	AHCA East First Team All-American	
Krys Kolanos	AHCA East Second Team All-American	
Scott Clemmensen	NCAA All-Tournament Team	
Rob Scuderi	NCAA All-Tournament Team	
Chuck Kobasew	NCAA All-Tournament Team	
Krys Kolanos	NCAA All-Tournament Team	
Brian Gionta	Hockey East Player of the Year	
Chuck Kobasew	Hockey East Rookie of the Year	
Mike Lephart	Hockey East Best Defensive Forward	
Bobby Allen	Hockey East Best Defensive Defenseman	
Brian Gionta	Hockey East Three-Stars Award	
Chuck Kobasew	William Flynn Tournament Most Valuable Player	
Brian Gionta	All-Hockey East First Team	
Bobby Allen	All-Hockey East First Team	
Chuck Kobasew	All-Hockey East Second Team	
Krys Kolanos	All-Hockey East Second Team	
J. D. Forrest	Hockey East All-Rookie Team	
Ben Eaves	Hockey East All-Rookie Team	
Chuck Kobasew	Hockey East All-Rookie Team	
Chuck Kobasew	Hockey East All-Tournament Team	
Tony Voce	Hockey East All-Tournament Team	
Bobby Allen	Hockey East All-Tournament Team	
Scott Clemmensen	Hockey East All-Tournament Team	

== Players drafted into the NHL ==
=== 2001 NHL entry draft ===
= NHL All-Star team	= NHL All-Star	= NHL All-Star and NHL All-Star team	= Did not play in the NHL

Round	Pick	Player	NHL team
1	14	Chuck Kobasew	Calgary Flames
4	111	Matti Kaltiainen ^{†}	Boston Bruins
4	131	Ben Eaves	Pittsburgh Penguins
6	179	Andrew Alberts ^{†}	Boston Bruins

† incoming freshman
