= 2001 Hockey East men's ice hockey tournament =

Hockey tournament

2001 Hockey East Men's ice hockey tournament
- Dates: March 8–17, 2001
- Teams: 8
- Finals site: Fleet Center; Boston, Massachusetts
- Champions: Boston College (5th title)
- Winning coach: Jerry York (3rd title)
- MVP: Chuck Kobasew (Boston College)
- Hockey East Men's Ice Hockey Tournaments

The 2001 Hockey East Men's Ice Hockey Tournament was the 17th tournament in the history of the conference. It was played between March 8 and March 17, 2001. Quarterfinal games were played at home team campus sites, while the final four games were played at the Fleet Center in Boston, Massachusetts, the home venue of the NHL's Boston Bruins. By winning the tournament, Boston College received the Hockey East's automatic bid to the 2001 NCAA Division I Men's Ice Hockey Tournament.

== Format ==
The tournament featured three rounds of play. The team that finishes ninth in the conference is not eligible for tournament play. In the first round, the first and eighth seeds, the second and seventh seeds, the third seed and sixth seeds, and the fourth seed and fifth seeds played a best-of-three with the winner advancing to the semifinals. In the semifinals, the highest and lowest seeds and second highest and second lowest seeds play a single-elimination game, with the winner advancing to the championship game. The tournament champion receives an automatic bid to the 2001 NCAA Division I Men's Ice Hockey Tournament.

== Conference standings ==
Note: GP = Games played; W = Wins; L = Losses; T = Ties; PTS = Points; GF = Goals For; GA = Goals Against

2000–01 Hockey East standings
	Conference							Overall					
	GP	W	L	T	PTS	GF	GA	GP	W	L	T	GF	GA
#1 Boston College†*	24	17	5	2	36	103	57	43	33	8	2	175	98
#7 Maine	24	12	7	5	29	70	62	39	20	12	7	116	95
#11 Providence	24	13	8	3	29	76	71	40	22	13	5	131	108
#14 New Hampshire	24	11	8	5	27	61	47	39	21	12	6	122	86
Massachusetts–Lowell	24	10	11	3	23	67	66	38	19	16	3	124	104
Boston University	24	9	12	3	21	66	77	37	14	20	3	109	118
Northeastern	24	7	13	4	18	58	73	36	13	19	4	102	122
Merrimack	24	7	14	3	17	60	86	38	14	20	4	92	121
Massachusetts	24	7	15	2	16	53	81	34	8	22	4	78	123
Championship: Boston College † indicates conference regular season champion * indicates conference tournament champion Final rankings: USA Today/American Hockey Magazine Poll Top 15 Poll

== Bracket ==
Quarterfinals; March 8–11
1	Boston College	1	5	—
8	Merrimack	0	1	—
2	Maine	2	6	—
7	Northeastern	1	3	—
(Pairings are reseeded after the first round)
3	Providence	6	1	4**
6	Boston University	3	2	3
4	New Hampshire	4	1	1
5	Massachusetts-Lowell	2	2	2

Semifinals; March 16
1	Boston College	5
5	Massachusetts-Lowell	1
2	Maine	3
3	Providence	4

Championship; March 17
1	Boston College	5
3	Providence	3

Note: * denotes overtime period(s)

=== Quarterfinals ===
==== (1) Boston College vs. (8) Merrimack ====
March 9	Boston College	1 – 0	Merrimack	Conte Forum	Recap
No Scoring		First period	No scoring
(Kobasew, Orpik) Tony Voce - GW - 01:16		Second period	No scoring
No scoring		Third period	No scoring
Scott Clemmensen ( 23 saves / 23 shots )		Goalie stats	Tom Welby ( 31 saves / 32 shots )

March 10	Boston College	5 – 1	Merrimack	Conte Forum	Recap
(Dolinar, Forrest) Mike Lephart - SH - 05:48		First period	No scoring
No scoring		Second period	04:46 - Nick Parillo (Johnson, Aquino)
Tony Voce - GW - 06:11 (Eaves, Giuliano) Brian Gionta - 07:48; Brian Gionta - 13:44 (Hennes, Peterson) A.J. Walker - 19:58		Third period	No scoring
Scott Clemmensen ( 25 saves / 26 shots )		Goalie stats	Joe Exter ( 43 saves / 48 shots )

Boston College won series 2–0

==== (2) Maine vs. (7) Northeastern ====
March 8	Maine	2 – 1	Northeastern	Alfond Arena	Recap
(Heisten, Richardson) Matthias Trattnig - PP - 19:45		First period	No scoring
No scoring		Second period	No scoring
(Schutte, Metcalf) Martin Kariya - GW - 13:26		Third period	04:30 - Joe Mastronardi (Ortlip)
Matt Yeats ( 28 saves / 29 shots )		Goalie stats	Mike Gilhooly ( 23 saves / 25 shots )

March 9	Maine	6 – 3	Northeastern	Alfond Arena	Recap
(Richardson, Heisten) Niko Dimitrakos - 01:56 (Kariya, Janik) Niko Dimitrakos - PP - 19:53		First period	No scoring
(Schutte, Kariya) Matthias Trattnig - 09:37 (Richardson, Dimitrakos) Chris Heisten - GW - 15:05		Second period	14:39 - John Peterman (Fahey, Mastronardi); 16:05 - Eric Ortlip (Jozefowicz)
(Heisten, Janik) Niko Dimitrakos - PP - 09:37 (Trattnig) Martin Kariya - EN - 19:43		Third period	19:01 - EA - Mike Jozefowicz (Fahey, Mischler)
Matt Yeats ( 24 saves / 27 shots )		Goalie stats	Mike Gilhooly ( 16 saves / 21 shots )

Maine won series 2–0

==== (3) Providence vs. (6) Boston University ====
March 9	Providence	6 – 3	Boston University	Schneider Arena	Recap
(Wright, Omicioli) Jon DiSalvatore - 07:40 (Kelly, Leach) Devin Rask - PP - 09:03 (Platt, Sunderman) Stephen Wood - 09:35		First period	10:49 - PP - Mike Pandolfo (Bussoli, Dyment)
No scoring		Second period	No scoring
(Weiman, Sunderman) J.J. Picinic - GW - 07:05 (Lee, Sunderman) J.J. Picinic - 10:52 (Fregoe, Leach) Devin Rask - 15:48		Third period	13:31 - Mike Pandolfo (Meyer); 16:19 - Dan Cavanaugh (Cronin, Mullen)
Nolan Schaefer ( 17 saves / 20 shots )		Goalie stats	Jason Tapp ( 6 saves / 9 shots ) / Sean Fields ( 13 saves / 19 shots )

March 10	Providence	1 – 2	Boston University	Schneider Arena	Recap
(Platt, DiSalvatore) John Luszcz - 01:42		First period	05:50 - PP - Mike Pandolfo (Sabo, Dyment)
No scoring		Second period	07:56 - GW - Freddy Meyer (Johnson, Priem)
No scoring		Third period	No scoring
Boyd Ballard ( 21 saves / 23 shots )		Goalie stats	Sean Fields ( 37 saves / 38 shots )

March 11	Providence	4 – 3	2OT	Boston University	Schneider Arena	Recap
(Zingoni, Weiman) Cole Gendreau - 02:49		First period		No scoring
(Rask, Kelly) Cody Loughlean - SH - 10:12 (Kelly, Fregoe) Jay Leach - PP - 18:09		Second period		03:20 - SH - Mike Pandolfo (Corazzini); 11:26 - PP - Mike Pandolfo (Cronin, Meyer)
No scoring		Third period		04:30 - SH - Mark Mullen
(Kelly, Libby) Marc Sunderman - GW - 16:26		Second overtime period		No scoring
Nolan Schaefer ( 24 saves / 27 shots )		Goalie stats		Sean Fields ( 48 saves / 52 shots )

Providence won series 2–1

==== (4) New Hampshire vs. (5) Massachusetts-Lowell ====
March 8	New Hampshire	4 – 2	Massachusetts-Lowell	Whittemore Center	Recap
(Hemingway, Gare) Mark White - PP - 16:09		First period	01:57 - Peter Hay (McGrane, Hainsey)
(Truelson, Austin) Darren Haydar - 14:19		Second period	01:57 - Geoff Schomogyi
(Haydar) Matt Swain - GW - 08:26 (Banga, Abbott) Nathan Martz - 12:05		Third period	No scoring
Ty Conklin ( 29 saves / 31 shots )		Goalie stats	Jimi St. John ( 28 saves / 32 shots )

March 9	New Hampshire	1 – 2	Massachusetts-Lowell	Whittemore Center	Recap
No Scoring		First period	No scoring
(Ficek) Johnny Rogers - 02:30		Second period	No scoring
No scoring		Third period	14:08 - PP - Ed McGrane (Rouleau, Meunier); 18:33 - GW - Peter Hay (Rooney)
Ty Conklin ( 23 saves / 25 shots )		Goalie stats	Jimi St. John ( 33 saves / 34 shots )

March 10	New Hampshire	1 – 2	Massachusetts-Lowell	Whittemore Center	Recap
(Martz, Mounsey) Matt Swain - 15:55		First period	16:17 - Jeff Boulanger (Carso, Slonina)
No scoring		Second period	No scoring
No scoring		Third period	08:25 - GW - Jeff Boulanger (Slonina, Carso)
Ty Conklin ( 18 saves / 20 shots )		Goalie stats	Jimi St. John ( 30 saves / 31 shots )

Massachusetts-Lowell won series 2–1

=== Semifinals ===
==== (1) Boston College vs. (5) Massachusetts-Lowell ====
March 16	Boston College	5 – 1	Massachusetts-Lowell	Fleet Center	Recap
Chuck Kobasew - 13:18		First period	11:32 - Tom Rouleau (Meunier, Hainsey)
(Scuderi, Orpik) Chuck Kobasew - GW PP - 13:18		Second period	No scoring
(Forrest, Allen) Ben Eaves - 00:29 (Kolanos, Lephart) Chuck Kobasew - PP - 03:17 (Eaves, Allen) Brian Gionta - PP - 05:01		Third period	No scoring
Scott Clemmensen ( 28 saves / 29 shots )		Goalie stats	Jimi St. John ( 30 saves / 35 shots )

==== (2) Maine vs. (3) Providence ====
March 16	Maine	3 – 4	Providence	Fleet Center	Recap
(Wright) Jon DiSalvatore - 08:16		First period	05:24 - Tom Reimann (Lawson, Kerluke); 18:57 - Tom Reimann (Janik, Lawson)
(Kelly) Peter Fregoe - PP - 08:23 (Loughlean, Fregoe) Devin Rask - 18:46		Second period	09:33 - Robert Liscak (Jackson, Lawson)
No scoring		Third period	09:33 - GW - Stephen Wood (Libby)
Matt Yeats ( 25 saves / 29 shots )		Goalie stats	Nolan Schaefer ( 20 saves / 23 shots )

=== Championship ===
==== (1) Boston College vs. (3) Providence ====
March 17	Boston College	5 – 3	Providence	Fleet Center	Recap
(Dolinar, Scuderi) Mike Lephart - SH - 14:34; Tony Voce - 16:22 (Lephart, Orpik) Krys Kolanos - 19:21		First period	02:29 - Drew Omicioli (Zingoni)
(Forrest, Kolanos) Tony Voce - GW PP - 06:23		Second period	06:51 - Michael Lucci (Omicioli); 13:08 - Adam Lee (Picinic, Sunderman)
(Eaves, Giuliano) Brian Gionta - 11:54		Third period	No scoring
Scott Clemmensen ( 12 saves / 15 shots )		Goalie stats	Nolan Schaefer ( 42 saves / 47 shots )

== Tournament awards ==
=== All-Tournament Team ===
- F Chuck Kobasew* (Boston College)
- F Mike Pandolfo (Boston University)
- F Tony Voce (Boston College)
- D Bobby Allen (Boston College)
- D Regan Kelly (Providence)
- G Scott Clemmensen (Boston College)

* Tournament MVP(s)
