= 2008–09 Boston College Eagles men's ice hockey season =

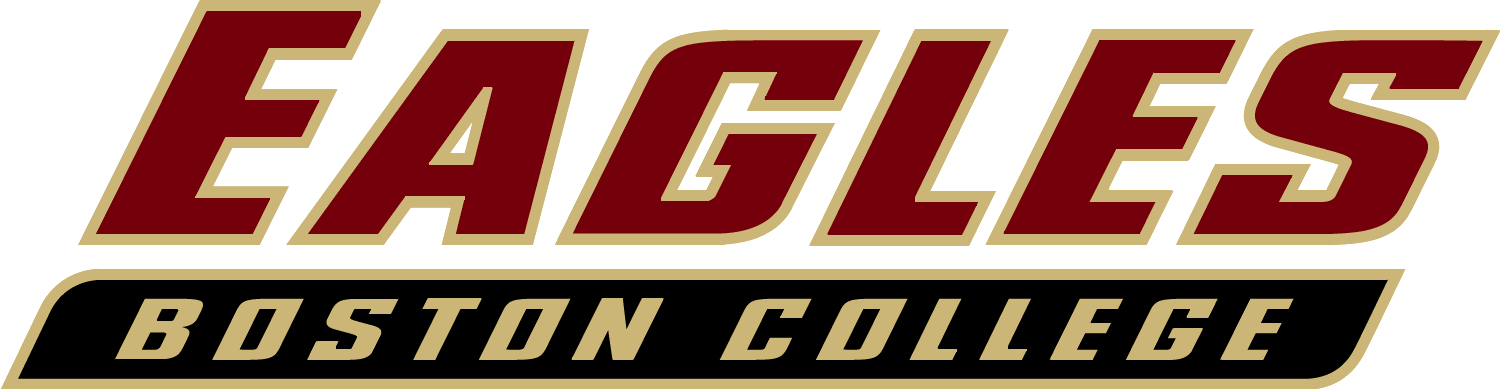
- Conference: 2nd Hockey East
- Home ice: Kelley Rink

Rankings
- USA Today: NR
- USCHO.com: #20

Record
- Overall: 18–14–5
- Conference: 11–11–5
- Home: 12–5–0
- Road: 5–7–5
- Neutral: 1–2–0

Coaches and captains
- Head coach: Jerry York
- Assistant coaches: Mike Cavanaugh; Greg Brown; Jim Logue
- Captain: Brock Bradford
- Alternate captain(s): Benn Ferriero, Tim Filangieri

The 2008-2009 Boston College Eagles men's ice hockey team represented Boston College in the 2008-2009 college hockey season. The team was coached by Jerry York, '67, his fifteenth season behind the bench at Boston College. The Eagles played their home games at Kelley Rink on the campus of Boston College, and competed in Hockey East.

Boston College entered the season as defending National Champions after defeating Notre Dame in the 2008 NCAA Tournament Championship game for the program's third national championship. The Eagles raised their 2008 title banner to the rafters of Kelley Rink in their home opener against Wisconsin on October 10, 2008.

The 2008-09 season was a generally poor one for the Eagles, as the team did not make the NCAA Tournament for the first time since 2002, and failed to defend both their Hockey East Tournament and Beanpot titles from the previous year.

Senior Brock Bradford captained the 2008-09 team after missing most of the 2007-08 season with an arm injury.

== Recruiting ==
Boston College added nine freshmen for the 2008-2009 season, including three defensemen, five forwards, and one goalie.

Player	Position	Nationality	Notes
Tommy Cross	Defense	United States	Simsbury, CT; Selected 35th overall by BOS in 2007 draft.
Edwin Shea	Defense	United States	Shrewsbury, MA; Three-time EJHL All-Star selection.
Barry Almeida	Forward	United States	Springfield, MA; Earned All-USHL First Team Honors with Omaha.
Jimmy Hayes	Forward	United States	Dorchester, MA; Selected 60th overall by TOR in 2008 draft.
Cam Atkinson	Forward	United States	Greenwich, CT; Selected 157th overall by CBJ in 2008 draft.
Paul Carey	Forward	United States	Weymouth, MA; Selected 135th overall by COL in 2007 draft.
Malcolm Lyles	Defense	United States	Miami Gardens, FL; Played three seasons at Deerfield Academy (MA).
Tommy Atkinson	Forward	United States	Greenwich, CT; Helped lead Avon Old Farms to two New England Prep School titles.
Chris Venti	Goalie	United States	Needham, MA; Twice voted team MVP at Buckingham Browne & Nichols.

== 2008–2009 roster ==
=== Departures from 2007–2008 team ===
- Mike Brennan, D - Graduation
- Joe Adams, F - Graduation
- Pat Gannon, F - Graduation
- Matt Greene, F - Graduation
- Dan Bertram, F - Graduation
- Nathan Gerbe, F - signed with BUF

=== 2008-2009 Eagles ===
Goaltenders
#	State	Player (Draft)	Catches	Year	Hometown	Previous team
1	(Massachusetts)	John Muse	L	Sophomore	East Falmouth, Massachusetts	Nobles
29	(Connecticut)	Alex Kremer	L	Junior	Darien, Connecticut	Taft
30	(Massachusetts)	Chris Venti	L	Freshman	Needham, Massachusetts	Buckingham Browne & Nichols

Defensemen
#	State	Player (Draft)	Shoots	Year	Hometown	Previous team
2	(Massachusetts)	Anthony Aiello (MIN, 129th overall 2005)	L	Senior	Braintree, Massachusetts	Thayer Academy
4	(Connecticut)	Tommy Cross - (BOS, 35th overall 2007)	L	Freshman	Simsbury, Connecticut	Westminster School
5	(New York (state))	Tim Filangieri - A	L	Senior	Islip Terrace, New York	Waterloo (USHL)
6	(New York (state))	Tim Kunes (CAR, 145th overall 2005)	L	Senior	Huntington, New York	New England (EJHL)
7	(Minnesota)	Carl Sneep (PIT, 32nd overall 2006)	R	Junior	Nisswa, Minnesota	Brainerd
8	(Massachusetts)	Edwin Shea	R	Freshman	Shrewsbury, Massachusetts	Boston (EJHL)
23	(Florida)	Malcolm Lyles	R	Freshman	Miami Gardens, Florida	Deerfield Academy
26	(New York (state))	Nick Petrecki (SJS, 28th overall 2007)	L	Sophomore	Clifton Park, New York	Omaha (USHL)

Forwards
#	State	Player (Draft)	Shoots	Year	Hometown	Previous team
9	(Massachusetts)	Barry Almeida	L	Freshman	Springfield, Massachusetts	Omaha (USHL)
10	(Massachusetts)	Jimmy Hayes (TOR, 60th overall 2008)	R	Freshman	Dorchester, Massachusetts	Lincoln (USHL)
12	(Connecticut)	Ben Smith (CHI, 169th overall 2008)	R	Junior	Avon, Connecticut	Westminster School
13	(Connecticut)	Cam Atkinson (CBJ, 157th overall 2008)	R	Freshman	Greenwich, Connecticut	Avon Old Farms
15	(Massachusetts)	Joe Whitney	L	Sophomore	Reading, Massachusetts	Lawrence Academy
17	(Massachusetts)	Brian Gibbons	L	Sophomore	Braintree, Massachusetts	Salisbury School
18	(Massachusetts)	Kyle Kucharski	L	Senior	Saugus, Massachusetts	Phillips Andover
19	(British Columbia)	Brock Bradford - C	R	Senior	Burnaby, British Columbia	Omaha (USHL)
21	(Massachusetts)	Benn Ferriero - A (PHX, 196th overall 2006)	R	Senior	Essex, Massachusetts	Governor's Academy
22	(Massachusetts)	Paul Carey (COL, 135th overall 2007)	L	Freshman	Weymouth, Massachusetts	Indiana (USHL)
24	(Massachusetts)	Matt Lombardi	R	Junior	Milton, Massachusetts	Governor's Academy
25	(Ontario)	Matt Price	R	Junior	Milton, Ontario	Milton Icehawks (OPJHL)
27	(New York (state))	Andrew Orpik (BUF, 227th overall 2005)	R	Senior	East Amherst, New York	Thayer Academy
28	(Connecticut)	Tommy Atkinson	L	Freshman	Greenwich, Connecticut	Avon Old Farms

== Standings ==
2008–09 Hockey East standings
	Conference							Overall					
	GP	W	L	T	PTS	GF	GA	GP	W	L	T	GF	GA
#1 Boston University†*	27	18	5	4	40	103	54	45	35	6	4	177	91
#11 Northeastern	27	18	6	3	39	78	59	41	25	12	4	121	91
#6 New Hampshire	27	15	8	4	32	80	78	38	20	13	5	116	112
#3 Vermont	27	15	8	4	32	78	69	39	22	12	5	121	102
Massachusetts–Lowell	27	14	11	2	30	84	66	38	20	16	2	112	86
Boston College	27	11	11	5	27	81	77	37	18	14	5	112	105
Massachusetts	27	10	14	3	23	77	75	39	16	20	3	112	103
Maine	27	7	17	3	17	52	82	39	13	22	4	86	110
Merrimack	27	5	19	3	13	57	80	34	9	21	4	72	89
Providence	27	4	18	5	13	56	106	34	7	22	5	77	133
Championship: Boston University † indicates conference regular season champion * indicates conference tournament champion Final rankings: USA Today/USA Hockey Magazine Top 15 Poll

== Schedule ==
=== 2008–2009 regular season ===
Date	Opponent	Time	Score	Rink
Oct. 10	vs. Wisconsin	7:00 p.m.	W 5-4	Kelley Rink
Oct. 17	vs. Bowling Green	7:00 p.m.	W 5-3	Kelley Rink
Oct. 18	at Northeastern*	7:05 p.m.	L 4-3	Matthews Arena
Oct. 24	vs. Vermont*	7:35 p.m.	W 3-2	Kelley Rink
Oct. 30	vs. Merrimack*	7:00 p.m.	W 4-1	Kelley Rink
Oct. 31	at Merrimack*	7:00 p.m.	W 4-3 (OT)	Lawlor Arena
Nov. 7	vs. Notre Dame	7:00 p.m.	L 4-1	Kelley Rink
Nov. 9	at Maine*	1:00 p.m.	L 2-1	Alfond Arena
Nov. 14	at Merrimack*	7:00 p.m.	T 5-5	Lawlor Arena
Nov. 15	vs. New Hampshire*	7:00 p.m.	W 8-6	Kelley Rink
Nov. 21	vs. Massachusetts*	7:00 p.m.	W 2-0	Kelley Rink
Nov. 22	at Massachusetts*	7:00 p.m.	L 4-3 (OT)	Mullins Center
Nov. 28	vs. Harvard	4:00 p.m.	W 5-1	Kelley Rink
Nov. 30	at Dartmouth	4:00 p.m.	W 2-1 (OT)	Thompson Arena
Dec. 5	at Boston University* (Green Line Rivalry)	7:00 p.m.	T 1-1	Agganis Arena
Dec. 6	vs. Boston University* (Green Line Rivalry)	7:00 p.m.	L 3-1	Kelley Rink
Jan. 2	at New Brunswick (exhib.)	6:00 p.m.	L 5-3	Aitken Centre
Jan. 3	at New Brunswick (exhib.)	6:00 p.m.	W 4-2	Aitken Centre
Jan. 9	at Vermont*	7:05 p.m.	T 3-3	Gutterson Fieldhouse
Jan. 10	at Vermont*	7:05 p.m.	L 4-2	Gutterson Fieldhouse
Jan. 16	vs. UMass Lowell*	7:00 p.m.	L 4-3 (OT)	Kelley Rink
Jan. 17	at Boston University* (Green Line Rivalry)	7:00 p.m.	L 5-2	Agganis Arena
Jan. 24	vs. Maine*	8:00 p.m.	W 6-3	Kelley Rink
Jan. 25	vs. Maine*	4:00 p.m.	W 4-1	Kelley Rink
Jan. 30	at Providence*	7:00 p.m.	T 2-2	Schneider Arena
Feb. 2	vs. Northeastern^{Beanpot}	8:00 p.m.	L 6-1	TD Banknorth Garden
Feb. 6	vs. Massachusetts*	7:00 p.m.	W 2-0	Kelley Rink
Feb. 9	vs. Harvard^{Beanpot Cons.}	5:00 p.m.	W 4-3	TD Banknorth Garden
Feb. 13	vs. UMass Lowell*	7:00 p.m.	L 6-0	Kelley Rink
Feb. 14	at UMass Lowell*	7:00 p.m.	T 4-4	Tsongas Arena
Feb. 20	at New Hampshire*	7:00 p.m.	L 3-2	Whittemore Center
Feb. 21	vs. New Hampshire*	7:00 p.m.	L 4-2	Kelley Rink
Feb. 27	vs. Providence*	7:00 p.m.	W 5-1	Kelley Rink
Feb. 28	at Providence*	7:00 p.m.	W 4-3 (OT)	Schneider Arena
Mar. 6	at Northeastern*	7:00 p.m.	L 2-1 (OT)	Matthews Arena
March. 7	vs. Northeastern*	7:00 p.m.	W 4-1	Kelley Rink

All times Eastern
* = Hockey East Conference Play
^{Beanpot} = 57th Annual Beanpot Tournament in Boston

=== 2009 Post-Season ===
Date	Opponent	Time	Score	Rink
Mar. 13	at New Hampshire; Hockey East Quarterfinals	7:00 p.m.	W 5-3	Whittemore Center
Mar. 14	at New Hampshire; Hockey East Quarterfinals	7:00 p.m.	W 1-0	Whittemore Center
Mar. 20	vs. Boston University (Green Line Rivalry); Hockey East Semifinals - Boston	8:00 p.m.	L 3-2	TD Banknorth Garden
