= Stephen Wood (ice hockey) =

American ice hockey player (born 1981)

- Born: August 18, 1981 (age 44) Cambridge, Massachusetts, USA
- Height: 6 ft 2 in (188 cm)
- Weight: 212 lb (96 kg; 15 st 2 lb)
- Position: Defenseman
- Shot: Right
- Played for: Philadelphia Phantoms; Trenton Titans; Peoria Rivermen; Alaska Aces; Bridgeport Sound Tigers; Trenton Devils; Herning Blue Fox; Esbjerg Energy; Sheffield Steelers
- Playing career: 2000–2010

Stephen Wood (born August 18, 1981) is an American ice hockey coach and former defenseman who was an All-American for Providence.

== Career ==
Wood joined the ice hockey team at Providence in 2000, playing as a depth defenseman for a team that reached the Hockey East finals and earned a bid to the NCAA Tournament. He took a more prominent role as a sophomore, leading the Friars' defense in scoring for three consecutive seasons. Unfortunately, the team was only marginally successful during this period. After finishing with a sub-.500 record in 2002, Wood helped Providence keep their heads above water as an upperclassmen but only just. In his final three years, the Friars went 1–6 in playoff games, losing the conference quarterfinals each season. Despite the middling results, Wood was well-regarded and named an All-American as a senior.

After graduating with a degree in business management, he signed a professional contract with the Philadelphia Flyers and began in their minor league system. He split his first full season between the AHL and ECHL, finishing the year with the Trenton Titans and helping the club win the Kelly Cup. After a second divided season, Wood began to move around and played for four different teams over a two year period. In 2008 he travelled to Europe and played two more years before retiring.

Wood's second career began shortly thereafter when he started working as an account executive for Hitachi Data Systems. After five years he joined Dell Technologies as a global account manager. In 2017, Wood left the accounting world and founded his own company, Beyond the Ice. The business provides a 7-week virtual hockey school for youth players, focusing on character building and mental aspects of the game.

== Career statistics ==
=== Regular season and playoffs ===
			Regular season					Playoffs
Season	Team	League	GP	G	A	Pts	PIM	GP	G	A	Pts	PIM
2000–01	Providence	Hockey East	36	3	4	7	68	—	—	—	—	—
2001–02	Providence	Hockey East	36	5	18	23	78	—	—	—	—	—
2002–03	Providence	Hockey East	34	9	20	29	48	—	—	—	—	—
2003–04	Providence	Hockey East	37	11	18	29	66	—	—	—	—	—
2003–04	Philadelphia Phantoms	AHL	4	0	0	0	0	—	—	—	—	—
2004–05	Philadelphia Phantoms	AHL	24	0	2	2	14	—	—	—	—	—
2004–05	Trenton Titans	ECHL	42	4	13	17	83	20	4	6	10	39
2005–06	Philadelphia Phantoms	AHL	28	2	9	11	22	—	—	—	—	—
2005–06	Trenton Titans	ECHL	38	7	21	28	67	2	2	0	2	2
2006–07	Bridgeport Sound Tigers	AHL	12	1	4	5	6	—	—	—	—	—
2006–07	Peoria Rivermen	AHL	16	0	2	2	10	—	—	—	—	—
2006–07	Alaska Aces	ECHL	25	8	6	14	52	13	0	2	2	26
2007–08	Peoria Rivermen	AHL	4	0	2	2	4	—	—	—	—	—
2007–08	Trenton Devils	ECHL	66	17	17	34	75	—	—	—	—	—
2008–09	Herning Blue Fox	AL-Bank Ligaen	4	0	0	0	4	—	—	—	—	—
2008–09	Esbjerg Energy	AL-Bank Ligaen	37	6	14	20	120	4	0	0	0	14
2009–10	Sheffield Steelers	EIHL	20	0	2	2	54	—	—	—	—	—
NCAA totals			143	28	60	88	260	—	—	—	—	—
ECHL totals			171	36	57	93	277	35	6	8	14	67
AHL totals			88	3	19	22	56	—	—	—	—	—

== Awards and honors ==
Award	Year
All-Hockey East Second Team	2002–03
All-Hockey East First Team	2003–04
AHCA East Second-Team All-American	2003–04
