= 2012–13 Boston College Eagles men's ice hockey season =

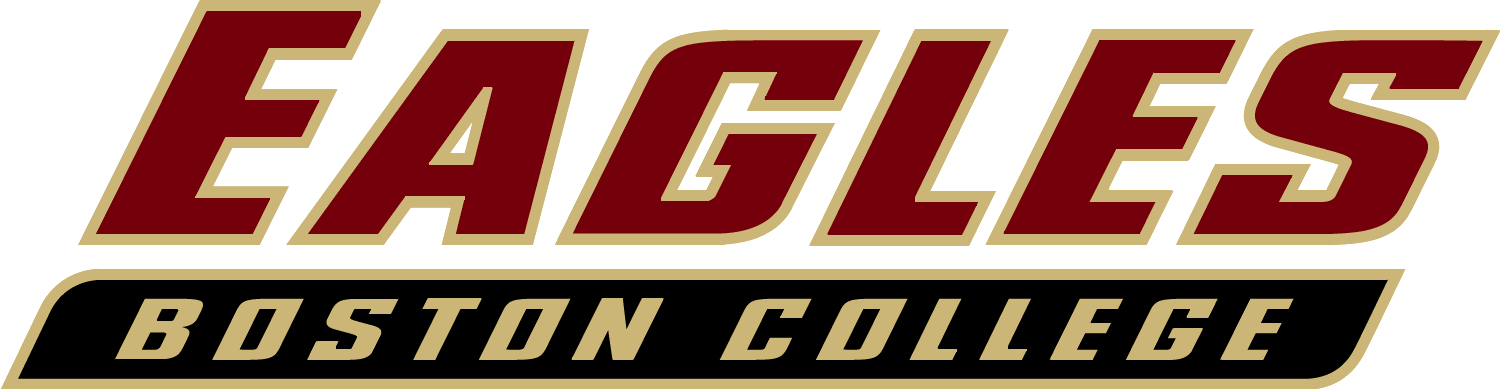

Beanpot Championship, W 6–3 vs. Northeastern
- Conference: Hockey East
- Home ice: Kelley Rink

Rankings
- USA Today/USA Hockey Magazine: #6
- USCHO.com/CBS College Sports: #6

Record
- Overall: 22-12-4
- Home: 11-5-2
- Road: 8-5-2
- Neutral: 3-2-0

Coaches and captains
- Head coach: Jerry York
- Assistant coaches: Mike Cavanaugh; Greg Brown; Jim Logue
- Captain: Pat Mullane
- Alternate captain(s): Patrick Wey, Steven Whitney

The 2012–13 Boston College Eagles men's ice hockey team represented Boston College in the 2012–13 NCAA Division I men's ice hockey season. The team was coached by Jerry York, his nineteenth season behind the bench at Boston College. The Eagles play their home games at Kelley Rink on the campus of Boston College, competing in Hockey East.

BC competed in two in-season tournaments during the 2012–13 season. In December, the Eagles participated in the Mariucci Classic hosted by Minnesota in Minneapolis, losing to host Minnesota in the championship match. BC also competed in the 61st annual Beanpot tournament alongside Boston-area schools Boston University, Harvard, and Northeastern, at TD Garden, defeating Northeastern in the championship to capture their fourth consecutive title.

Despite a strong 22–12–4 record and 15–9–3 in conference play, one point short of the regular season title, the Eagles did not fare well in the postseason. Following a semifinal loss to Boston University in the Hockey East tournament, the Eagles fell to Union College in the first round of NCAA Tournament. However, a few bright spots of the season included sophomore Johnny Gaudreau being a Hobey Baker award finalist after helping the US National Junior team to win a gold medal at the 2013 World Junior Championship in Ufa, Russia, as well as Head Coach Jerry York became the winningest head coach in NCAA Hockey history, passing Ron Mason, with his 925th win over Alabama-Huntsville in the 2012 Mariucci Classic.

== Previous season recap ==
The Eagles entered the season as the defending national champions, having won the program's fifth NCAA title by defeating Ferris State in the championship game of the 2012 NCAA Tournament. BC also enters the 2012–13 season as defending Hockey East tournament and regular season champions, defeating Maine in the 2012 Hockey East Tournament final and finishing ahead of Boston University and UMass Lowell in the final Hockey East regular season standings. BC also retained the Beanpot in 2012, their third title in a row, by defeating Boston University in overtime of the championship game. The Eagles raised their 2012 National Championship banner to the Conte Forum rafters in their home-opener against Northeastern on October 20, 2012, a 3-0 victory.

== Offseason ==
April 10, 2012: Juniors Chris Kreider and Brian Dumoulin decided to forgo their senior seasons to pursue professional careers. Kreider joined the New York Rangers, who drafted the forward in the first round of the 2009 NHL entry draft, making his debut for the Rangers during the 2012 Stanley Cup Playoffs. Dumoulin joined with the Carolina Hurricanes organization, who had drafted him in the second round of the 2009 NHL Entry Draft. He was then traded to the Pittsburgh Penguins in the deal for Jordan Staal.

May 15, 2012: Boston College received an anonymous gift of $5 million to endow the men's ice hockey coaching position, the largest gift ever made in support of a BC athletics team.

May 16, 2012: The national championship team was honored in Boston at Boston City Hall and the Massachusetts State House. The Eagles presented Massachusetts governor Deval Patrick with a commemorative hockey jersey.

September 20, 2012: Assistant Coach Greg Brown was promoted to Associated Head Coach.

== Recruiting ==
Boston College adds six freshmen for the 2012-13 season: defenseman Colin Sullivan, a seventh round draft pick of the Montreal Canadiens in the 2011 NHL entry draft; defenseman Teddy Doherty, one of three current Eagles who played for Dubuque of the USHL; defenseman Michael Matheson, a first round pick of the Florida Panthers in the 2012 NHL entry draft; defenseman Travis Jeke, one of three players for Boston College from Pittsburgh; forward Brendan Silk, a product of the USA Hockey National Team Development Program; and forward Peter McMullen, who earned New Jersey Star Ledger All-State honors in 2010-11 after leading Delbarton Prep in scoring. A seventh recruit, forward Frank Vatrano, withdrew from the university in later September 2012.

Player	Position	Nationality	Notes
Colin Sullivan	Defense	United States	Milford, CT; Selected 198th overall by MTL in 2011 draft.
Teddy Doherty	Defense	United States	Hopkinton, MA; Attended Shattuck-St. Mary's from 2008-2011.
Michael Matheson	Defense	Canada	Pointe-Claire, QC; Selected 23rd overall by FLA in 2012 draft.
Travis Jeke	Defense	United States	Pittsburgh, PA; Earned Northwood School's Tim Hyde Hockey Award for contributions to the program.
Brendan Silk	Forward	United States	Wakefield, MA; 2012-13 recipient of the Edward J. O'Brien, Jr., M.D. Men's Ice Hockey Scholarship.
Peter McMullen	Forward	United States	Essex Fells, NJ; Played the 2011-12 season for two teams in the BCHL.

== 2012–2013 roster ==
=== Departures from 2011–2012 team ===
- Barry Almeida, F – graduation
- Tommy Atkinson, F – graduation
- Paul Carey, F – graduation
- Tommy Cross, D – graduation
- Edwin Shea, D – graduation
- Chris Venti, G – graduation
- Chris Kreider, F – signed with New York Rangers
- Brian Dumoulin, D – signed with Carolina Hurricanes, then traded to Pittsburgh Penguins
- Mark Begert, D – left team

=== 2012–13 Eagles ===
As of September 26, 2012.

No.	Nat.	Player	Class	Pos	Height	Weight	DoB	Hometown	Previous team	NHL rights
1		Brian Billet	Sophomore	G	6' 1" (1.85 m)	185 lb (84 kg)	1992-03-19	Brunswick, Maine	New Hampshire (EJHL)	—
2		Colin Sullivan	Freshman	D	6' 1" (1.85 m)	205 lb (93 kg)	1993-03-26	Milford, Connecticut	Avon Old Farms (USHS–CT)	MTL, 198th overall 2011
3		Patch Alber	Senior	D	5' 10" (1.78 m)	170 lb (77 kg)	1989-03-11	Clifton Park, New York	Boston (EJHL)	—
4		Teddy Doherty	Freshman	D	5' 9" (1.75 m)	178 lb (81 kg)	1994-04-25	Hopkinton, Massachusetts	Dubuque (USHL)	—
5		Michael Matheson	Freshman	D	6' 2" (1.88 m)	189 lb (86 kg)	1994-02-27	Pointe-Claire, Quebec	Dubuque (USHL)	FLA, 23rd overall 2012
6		Patrick Wey (A)	Senior	D	6' 3" (1.91 m)	207 lb (94 kg)	1991-03-21	Pittsburgh, Pennsylvania	Waterloo (USHL)	WSH, 115th overall 2009
7		Isaac MacLeod	Junior	D	6' 5" (1.96 m)	214 lb (97 kg)	1992-02-22	Nelson, British Columbia	Penticton (BCHL)	SJS, 136th overall 2010
8		Travis Jeke	Freshman	D	6' 2" (1.88 m)	192 lb (87 kg)	1993-06-11	Pittsburgh, Pennsylvania	Northwood (USHS–NY)	—
9		Brendan Silk	Freshman	F	6' 3" (1.91 m)	190 lb (86 kg)	1994-01-13	Wakefield, Massachusetts	US NTDP (USHL)	—
10		Danny Linell	Sophomore	F	5' 7" (1.7 m)	178 lb (81 kg)	1992-09-04	Great Neck, New York	Choate (USHS–CT)	—
11		Pat Mullane (C)	Senior	F	5' 11" (1.8 m)	188 lb (85 kg)	1990-07-31	Wallingford, Connecticut	Omaha (USHL)	—
12		Kevin Hayes	Junior	F	6' 3" (1.91 m)	213 lb (97 kg)	1992-05-08	Dorchester, Massachusetts	Nobles (USHS–MA)	CHI, 24th overall 2010
13		Johnny Gaudreau	Sophomore	F	5' 8" (1.73 m)	153 lb (69 kg)	1993-08-13	Carneys Point, New Jersey	Dubuque (USHL)	CGY, 104th overall 2011
14		Brooks Dyroff	Senior	F	6' 0" (1.83 m)	197 lb (89 kg)	1990-01-22	Boulder, Colorado	Phillips Andover (USHS–MA)	—
15		Cam Spiro	Sophomore	F	5' 10" (1.78 m)	210 lb (95 kg)	1991-12-30	Hingham, Massachusetts	Tabor (USHS–MA)	—
17		Destry Straight	Sophomore	F	6' 1" (1.85 m)	190 lb (86 kg)	1993-03-22	West Vancouver, British Columbia	Coquitlam (BCHL)	—
18		Michael Sit	Sophomore	F	5' 10" (1.78 m)	171 lb (78 kg)	1993-02-04	Edina, Minnesota	Edina (USHS–MN)	—
20		Peter McMullen	Freshman	F	6' 1" (1.85 m)	209 lb (95 kg)	1993-02-19	Essex Fells, New Jersey	Delbarton (USHS-NJ)	—
21		Steven Whitney (A)	Senior	F	5' 7" (1.7 m)	167 lb (76 kg)	1991-02-18	Reading, Massachusetts	Lawrence (USHS–MA)	—
23		Patrick Brown	Junior	F	6' 1" (1.85 m)	207 lb (94 kg)	1992-05-29	Bloomfield Hills, Michigan	Cranbrook-Kingswood (USHS–MI)	—
23		Roh Krishnan	Sophomore	F	5' 11" (1.8 m)	185 lb (84 kg)	1990-10-22	Concord, Massachusetts	Monta vista (Norcal Junior)	—
24		Bill Arnold	Junior	F	6' 1" (1.85 m)	207 lb (94 kg)	1992-05-13	Needham, Massachusetts	US NTDP (USHL)	CGY, 108th overall 2010
27		Quinn Smith	Sophomore	F	5' 8" (1.73 m)	173 lb (78 kg)	1992-01-11	Fairfield, Connecticut	Avon Old Farms (USHS–CT)	—
29		Brad Barone	Sophomore	G	5' 10" (1.78 m)	179 lb (81 kg)	1990-12-02	Medfield, Massachusetts	South Shore (EJHL)	—
35		Parker Milner	Senior	G	6' 1" (1.85 m)	188 lb (85 kg)	1990-09-06	Pittsburgh, Pennsylvania	Waterloo (USHL)	—

=== Coaching staff ===
Name	Position	Seasons at Boston College	Alma mater
Jerry York	Head Coach	19	Boston College (1967)
Mike Cavanaugh	Associate head coach	18	Bowdoin College (1976)
Greg Brown	Associate head coach	9	Boston College (1990)
Jim Logue	Assistant coach, Goaltending	19	Boston College (1961)

== Standings ==
- On September 25, 2012, BC was picked to finish first in the preseason Hockey East coaches poll.

2012–13 Hockey East standings
	Conference record							Overall record					
	GP	W	L	T	PTS	GF	GA	GP	W	L	T	GF	GA
#3 Massachusetts–Lowell † *	27	16	9	2	34	81	63	41	28	11	2	123	83
#9 Boston College	27	15	9	3	33	88	72	38	22	12	4	128	107
#17 Boston University	27	15	10	2	32	82	73	39	21	16	2	120	110
#11 New Hampshire	27	13	8	6	32	81	58	39	20	12	7	122	90
#18 Providence	27	13	8	6	32	75	63	38	17	14	7	105	90
Merrimack	27	13	11	3	29	68	66	38	15	17	6	91	98
Vermont	27	8	13	6	22	60	80	36	11	19	6	82	110
Maine	27	7	12	8	22	57	72	38	11	19	8	77	104
Massachusetts	27	9	16	2	20	72	79	34	12	19	3	93	102
Northeastern	27	5	18	4	14	59	97	34	9	21	4	81	118
Championship: March 23, 2013 † indicates conference regular season champion; * indicates conference tournament champion Rankings: USCHO.com Top 20 Poll

== Schedule ==
=== 2012–2013 regular season ===
Date	Rank	Opponent	Time	Score	Rink	Record	Conference
Oct. 6	#1	vs. New Brunswick (exhib.)	7:00 p.m.	W 6-0	Kelley Rink	0-0-0	0-0-0
Oct. 13	#1	at Northeastern*	7:00 p.m.	L 3-1	Matthews Arena	0-1-0	0-1-0
Oct. 19	#3	at Massachusetts*	7:00 p.m.	W 5-4 (OT)	Mullins Center	1-1-0	1-1-0
Oct. 20	#3	vs. #14 Northeastern*	7:10 p.m.	W 3-0	Kelley Rink	2-1-0	2-1-0
Oct. 26	#1	at #11 UMass Lowell*	7:00 p.m.	W 1-0	Tsongas Center	3-1-0	3-1-0
Oct. 28	#1	vs. #11 UMass Lowell*	4:00 p.m.	W 6-3	Kelley Rink	4-1-0	4-1-0
Nov. 2	#1	at Maine*	7:00 p.m.	W 4-2	Alfond Arena	5-1-0	5-1-0
Nov. 4	#1	vs. Massachusetts*	4:00 p.m.	W 3-2	Kelley Rink	6-1-0	6-1-0
Nov. 9	#1	vs. #7 Notre Dame (Holy War)	7:00 p.m.	W 3-1	Kelley Rink	7-1-0	6-1-0
Nov. 11	#1	at #11 Boston University* (Green Line Rivalry)	5:00 p.m.	W 4-2	Agganis Arena	8-1-0	7-1-0
Nov. 16	#1	vs. Merrimack*	7:00 p.m.	W 4-3	Kelley Rink	9-1-0	8-1-0
Nov. 24	#1	vs. #11 Dartmouth	4:00 p.m.	W 6-3	Kelley Rink	10-1-0	8-1-0
Nov. 30	#1	at #9 Boston University* (Green Line Rivalry)	7:30 p.m.	L 4-2	Agganis Arena	10-2-0	8-2-0
Dec. 1	#1	vs. #9 Boston University* (Green Line Rivalry)	7:30 p.m.	W 5-2	Kelley Rink	11-2-0	9-2-0
Dec. 7	#2	at Providence*	7:00 p.m.	T 3-3	Schneider Arena	11-2-1	9-2-1
Dec. 29	#1	vs. Alabama-Huntsville^{Mariucci Classic}	5:00 p.m.	W 5-2	Mariucci Arena	12-2-1	9-2-1
Dec. 30	#1	at #4 Minnesota^{Mariucci Classic}	8:00 p.m.	L 8-1	Mariucci Arena	12-3-1	9-2-1
Jan. 4	#2	vs. #17 Yale	7:00 p.m.	T-3-3	Kelley Rink	12-3-2	9-2-1
Jan. 11	#2	vs. #4 New Hampshire*	7:00 p.m.	W 5-2	Kelley Rink	13-3-2	10-2-1
Jan. 12	#2	at #4 New Hampshire*	7:00 p.m.	L 2-1	Whittemore Center	13-4-2	10-3-1
Jan. 18	#2	vs. Massachusetts*	7:00 p.m.	L 5-2	Kelley Rink	13-5-2	10-4-1
Jan. 19	#2	at Northeastern*	7:00 p.m.	W 9-3	Matthews Arena	14-5-2	11-4-1
Jan. 25	#3	vs. Maine*	7:00 p.m.	L 4-1	Kelley Rink	14-6-2	11-5-1
Jan. 26	#3	vs. Maine*	7:00 p.m.	L 3-1	Kelley Rink	14-7-2	11-6-1
Feb. 1	#5	vs. Vermont*	7:00 p.m.	W 4-1	Kelley Rink	15-7-2	12-6-1
Feb. 4	#5	vs. Harvard^{Beanpot}	8:00 p.m.	W 4-1	TD Garden	16-7-2	12-6-1
Feb. 11	#4	vs. Northeastern^{Beanpot}	7:30 p.m.	W 6-3	TD Garden	17-7-2	12-6-1
Feb. 15	#4	at #19 Merrimack*	7:30 p.m.	L 2-1 (OT)	Lawler Arena	17-8-2	12-7-1
Feb. 17	#4	vs. #5 New Hampshire*	4:00 p.m.	T-4-4	Kelley Rink	17-8-3	12-7-2
Feb. 24	#4	at #17 Merrimack*	4:00 p.m.	W 2-1 (OT)	Lawler Arena	18-8-3	13-7-2
Feb. 26 (rescheduled from 2/8)	#4	vs. #10 UMass Lowell*	7:00 p.m.	L 4-2	Kelley Rink	18-9-3	13-8-2
Mar. 1	#4	at #20 Providence*	7:00 p.m.	W 3-2	Schneider Arena	19-9-3	14-8-2
Mar. 2	#4	vs. #20 Providence*	7:00 p.m.	L 5-1	Kelley Rink	19-10-3	14-9-2
Mar. 8	#6	at Vermont*	7:00 p.m.	T 4-4	Gutterson Fieldhouse	19-10-4	14-9-3
Mar. 9	#6	at Vermont*	7:00 p.m.	W 7-2	Gutterson Fieldhouse	20-10-4	15-9-3

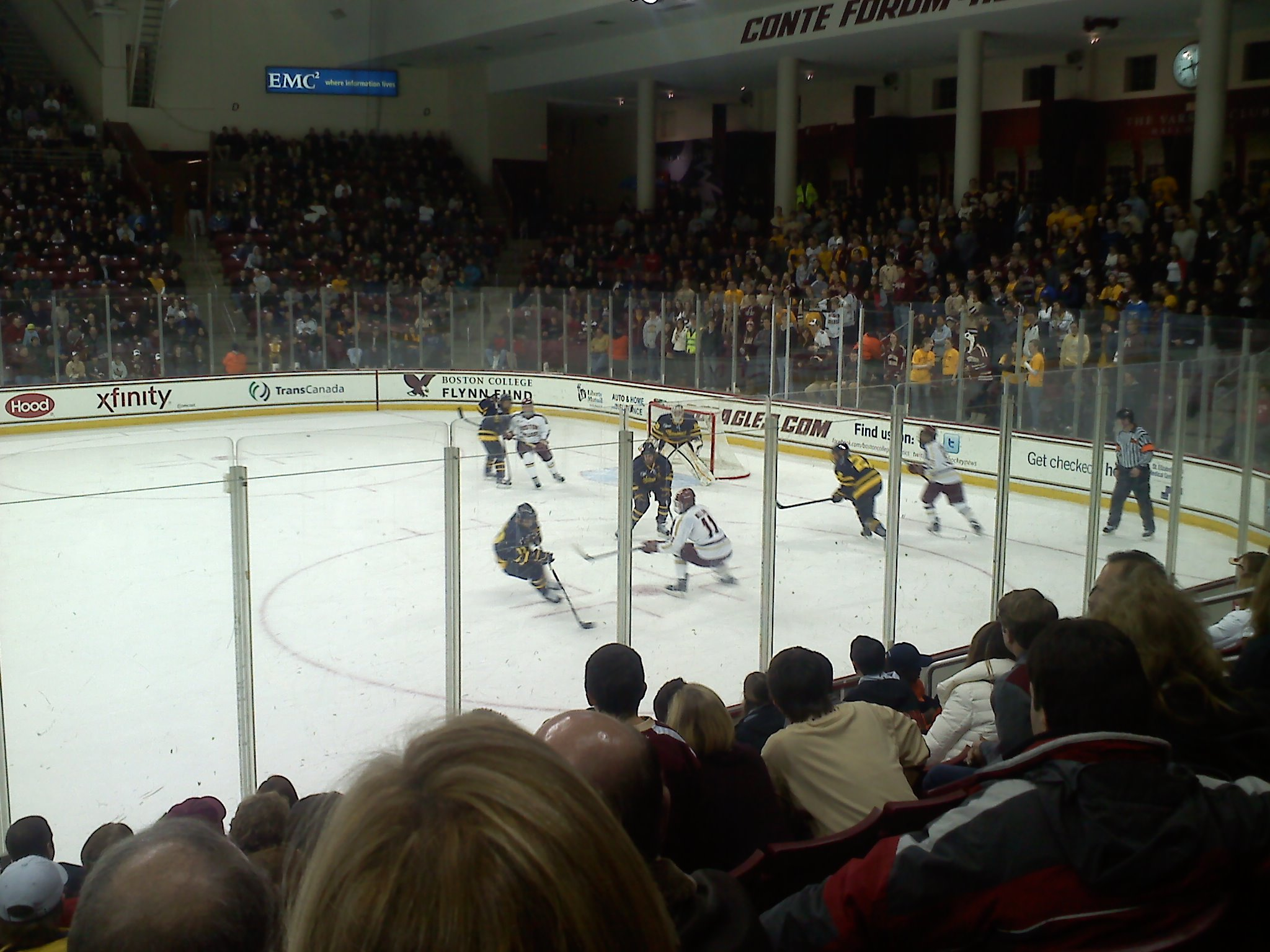
Merrimack vs. BC at Kelley Rink on Nov. 16, 2012. BC won 4-3.

All times Eastern
Rankings from USCHO.com/CBS College Sports Poll
* = Hockey East Conference Play
^{Marriucci Classic} = 22nd Annual Mariucci Classic in Minneapolis, MN
^{Beanpot} = 61st Annual Beanpot Tournament in Boston, MA

- On December 1, the Eagles defeated rivals Boston University 5-2 to secure Jerry York's 924th career coaching victory, tying Ron Mason as college hockey's all-time wins leader.
- On December 4, sophomore forward Johnny Gaudreau was named to the United States National Junior Team preliminary roster.
- On December 28, sophomore forward Johnny Gaudreau was included in the final roster for the United States National Junior Team to compete at the 2013 World Junior Ice Hockey Championship in Ufa, Russia.
- On December 29, Boston College defeated Alabama Huntsville in the first round of the Mariucci Classic, securing head coach Jerry York's record 925 career coaching victory, surpassing Ron Mason as the new all-time wins leader in college hockey.
- On January 5, sophomore forward Johnny Gaudreau and the United States National Junior Team defeated Sweden 3-1 to capture gold at the 2013 World Junior Ice_Hockey Championship. Gaudreau led the tournament with seven goals.
- Head coach Jerry York missed the New Hampshire series on January 11 and 12 and games against Massachusetts and Northeastern on January 18 and 19 due to outpatient eye surgery. A celebration to honor Coach York on becoming the all-time career wins leader which was scheduled for January 18 was postponed.
- On February 11, Boston College defeated Northeastern 6-3 in the Beanpot tournament to win their fourth straight Beanpot title and 18th all-time.

=== 2013 post-season ===
Date	Playoff Round	Opponent	Time	Score	Rink
Mar. 15	Hockey East Tournament Quarterfinals	Vermont	7:00pm	W 4-2	Kelley Rink
Mar. 16	Hockey East Tournament Quarterfinals	Vermont	7:00pm	W 4-1	Kelley Rink
Mar. 22	Hockey East Tournament Semifinals	Boston University	8:00pm	L 6-3	TD Garden
Mar. 29	NCAA Tournament Regionals	Union	9:00pm	L 5-1	Dunkin' Donuts Center

All times Eastern

- In the 2012-13 Hockey East Tournament, the Eagles swept the Vermont Catamounts in the best of 3 round (scores of 4-2, and 4-1), but fell to arch-rival Boston University in the semi-finals by a score of 6-3. For the senior class, it was the first loss at their "home away from home", the TD Garden, having previously won the three previous Hockey East tournaments and the four previous Beanpot tournaments. BU went on to face UMass Lowell in the title game, losing 1-0 to the Riverhawks, who captured their first Hockey East Title.
- The Eagles fell in the first round of the NCAA Tournament to the Union Dutchmen, by a score of 5-1. This was the first ever meeting between the two schools. It was also the final game for the following BC seniors: forwards Steven Whitney, Brooks Dyroff, captain Pat Mullane, defensemen Patrick Wey, Patch Alber, and goaltender Parker Milner. The Dutchmen went on to face Quinnipiac in the Regional Final, losing to the Bobcats by a score of 5-1.
- On April 2, rising-senior Patrick Brown (forward) was named the 2013-14 season Captain, and rising-seniors Bill Arnold (forward) and Isaac Macleod (defense) were named Assistant Captains.
- On April 3, Johnny Gaudreau was announced as one of the three Hobey Baker Hat-Trick Finalists for the 2012-13 season.

== Statistics ==
=== Skaters ===
No.	Player	POS	YR	GP	G	A	Pts	PIM	PP	SHG	GWG	+/-	SOG
1	Brian Billett	G	SO	0	0	0	0	0	0	0	0	0	0
2	Colin Sullivan	D	FR	3	0	0	0	2	0	0	0	-4	0
3	Patch Alber	D	SR	3	0	0	0	4	0	0	0	+2	4
4	Teddy Doherty	D	FR	3	0	0	0	4	0	0	0	+1	4
5	Michael Matheson	D	FR	3	0	0	0	8	0	0	0	+3	5
6	Patrick Wey	D	SR	3	0	2	2	4	0	0	0	+2	9
7	Isaac Macleod	D	JR	3	0	0	0	2	0	0	0	-3	1
8	Travis Jeke	D	FR	0	0	0	0	0	0	0	0	0	0
9	Brendan Silk	F	FR	3	0	0	0	0	0	0	0	-2	2
10	Danny Linell	F	SO	3	0	0	0	2	0	0	0	-2	5
11	Pat Mullane	F	SR	3	2	4	6	15	0	0	0	+3	12
12	Kevin Hayes	F	JR	3	1	2	3	2	1	0	1	+1	10
13	Johnny Gaudreau	F	SO	3	2	3	5	0	0	0	1	+2	13
14	Brooks Dyroff	F	SR	3	0	0	0	0	0	0	0	-2	4
15	Cam Spiro	F	SO	0	0	0	0	0	0	0	0	0	0
17	Destry Straight	F	SO	3	1	0	1	2	0	0	0	+1	7
18	Michael Sit	F	SO	3	0	0	0	0	0	0	0	-2	2
20	Peter McMullen	F	FR	0	0	0	0	0	0	0	0	-	0
21	Steven Whitney	F	SR	3	2	1	3	4	2	0	0	+3	10
23	Patrick Brown	F	JR	3	0	0	0	0	0	0	0	-2	2
24	Bill Arnold	F	JR	3	1	0	1	4	0	0	0	+1	7
27	Quinn Smith	F	SO	3	0	0	0	0	0	0	0	-2	4
29	Brad Barone	G	SO	0	0	0	0	0	0	0	0	0	0
35	Parker Milner	G	SR	3	0	0	0	0	0	0	0	E	0
	Bench			0	0	0	0	0	0	0	0	0	0
	Team			3	9	15	24	51	3	0	2	E	101

=== Goaltenders ===
No.	Player	YR	GP	MIN	W	L	T	GA	GAA	SA	SV	SV%	SO
1	Brian Billett	SO	0	0	0	0	0	0	0	0	0	0	0
29	Brad Barone	SO	0	0	0	0	0	0	0	0	0	0	0
35	Parker Milner	SR	3	182:36	0	1	0	7	2.30	79	72	.911	1

== Awards and honors ==
Hobey Baker Hat-Trick Finalist

- Johnny Gaudreau, F - 2012-13

ACHA Division I - All Americans

- Johnny Gaudreau - First Team
- Steven Whitney - First Team

Hockey East Player of the Year

- Johnny Gaudreau, F - 2012-13 Archived 2015-02-14 at the Wayback Machine

Hockey East All-Stars

- Johnny Gaudreau, F - All-First Team Archived 2013-03-25 at the Wayback Machine
- Steven Whitney, F - All-First Team Archived 2013-03-25 at the Wayback Machine
- Patrick Wey, D - All-Second Team Archived 2013-03-25 at the Wayback Machine
- Michael Matheson, D - All-Rookie Team Archived 2016-03-04 at the Wayback Machine

Hockey East Awards

- Patrick Wey, D - 'Old Time Hockey' Best Defensive Defensman Archived 2016-03-04 at the Wayback Machine
- Johnny Gaudreau, F - 'Turfer Athletic' Scoring Champion, 36 Points Archived 2016-03-04 at the Wayback Machine

New England D-I Men's Hockey All Stars & Awards

- Johnny Gaudreau, F - All Star, Leonard Fowle Award - Most Valuable Player, Herb Gallaher Award - Best Forward
- Steven Whitney, F - All Star
- Michael Matheson, D - All Star

Hockey East Player of the Month

- Pat Mullane, F - Month of October 2012
- Johnny Gaudreau, F - Month of November 2012

Hockey East Team of the Week

- Week of October 22, 2012
- Week of October 29, 2012
- Week of November 12, 2012

Hockey East Player of the Week

- Johnny Gaudreau, F - Week of October 22, 2012, Week of November 12, 2012, Week of March 11, 2013
- Parker Milner, G - Week of October 29, 2012 (shared with Mike Collins, F, Merrimack)
- Steven Whitney, F - Week of January 21, 2013 (shared with Branden Gracel, F, Massachusetts)

Hockey East Defensive Player of the Week

- Parker Milner, G - Week of November 12, 2012, Week of January 14, 2013, Week of February 25, 2013

Hockey East Rookie of the Week

- Michael Matheson, D - Week of December 10, 2012 (shared with Nick Saracino, G, Providence)

Beanpot - Eberly Award

- Parker Milner, G

61st Walter Brown Award

- Steven Whitney, F

AHCA Terry Flanagan Award

- Mike Cavanaugh, Associate head coach
