= Mike Pandolfo =

American ice hockey player

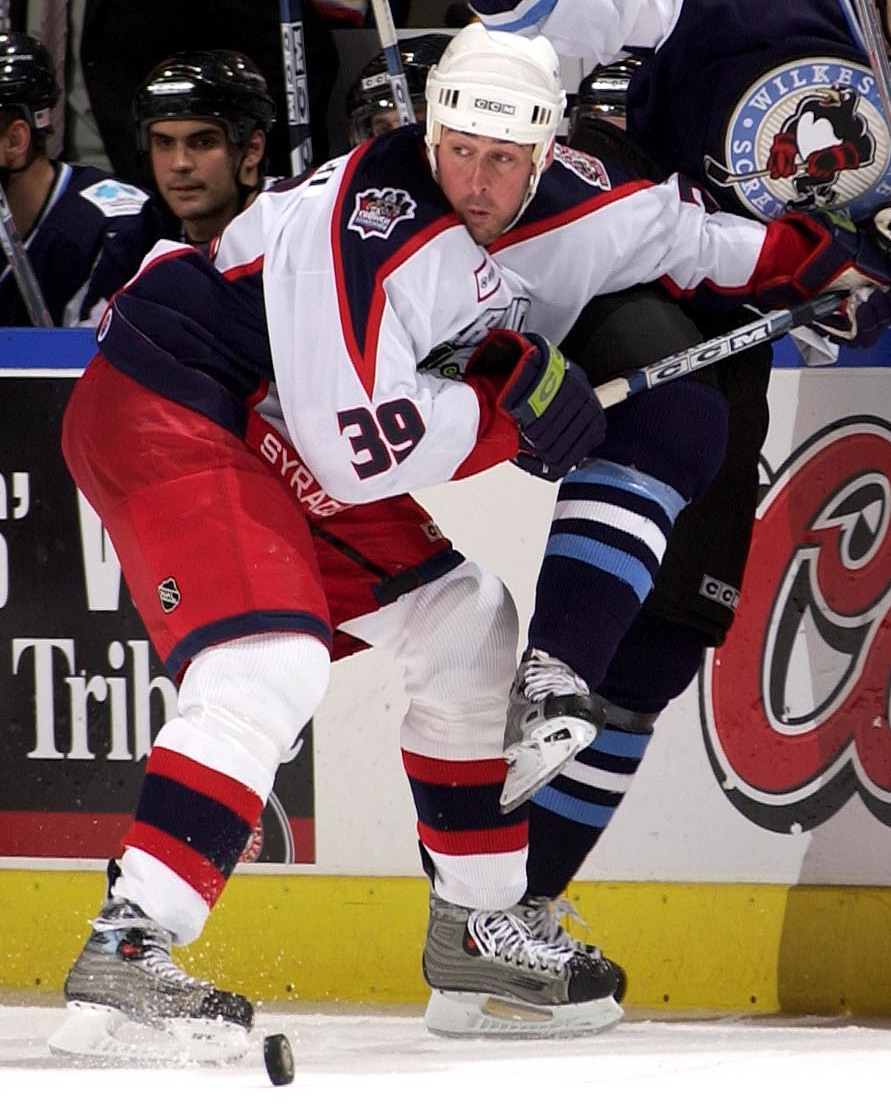
- Pandalfo with the Syracuse Crunch in 2004
- Born: September 15, 1979 (age 46) Winchester, Massachusetts, U.S.
- Height: 6 ft 3 in (191 cm)
- Weight: 225 lb (102 kg; 16 st 1 lb)
- Position: Left wing
- Shot: Left
- Played for: Columbus Blue Jackets
- NHL draft: 77th overall, 1998; Buffalo Sabres
- Playing career: 2002–2008

Michael J. Pandolfo (born September 15, 1979) is an American retired professional ice hockey left wing. He was born in Winchester, Massachusetts, and raised in Burlington, Massachusetts. He was drafted in the third round, 77th overall, by the Buffalo Sabres in the 1998 NHL entry draft. The Sabres traded his rights to the Columbus Blue Jackets in a deal during the 2002 NHL entry draft. He played three games in the National Hockey League during the 2003–04 season with the Blue Jackets, going scoreless. Pandolfo played parts of two seasons as a member of the Lowell Devils, the AHL affiliate of New Jersey Devils, for whom his older brother Jay Pandolfo played. He retired after the 2007–08 season.

== Career statistics ==
=== Regular season and playoffs ===
			Regular season					Playoffs
Season	Team	League	GP	G	A	Pts	PIM	GP	G	A	Pts	PIM
1996–97	Saint Sebastian's School	HS-MA	32	27	28	55	30	—	—	—	—	—
1997–98	Saint Sebastian's School	HS-MA	28	29	23	52	18	—	—	—	—	—
1998–99	Boston University	HE	34	13	4	17	26	—	—	—	—	—
1999–00	Boston University	HE	42	13	10	23	35	—	—	—	—	—
2000–01	Boston University	HE	37	16	13	29	30	—	—	—	—	—
2001–02	Boston University	HE	38	22	18	40	22	—	—	—	—	—
2002–03	Syracuse Crunch	AHL	74	9	9	18	31	—	—	—	—	—
2003–04	Columbus Blue Jackets	NHL	3	0	0	0	0	—	—	—	—	—
2003–04	Syracuse Crunch	AHL	77	18	19	37	29	7	1	0	1	2
2004–05	Syracuse Crunch	AHL	62	8	8	16	18	—	—	—	—	—
2005–06	Reading Royals	ECHL	23	14	11	25	8	—	—	—	—	—
2005–06	Binghamton Senators	AHL	1	0	0	0	4	—	—	—	—	—
2005–06	EHC München	GER-2	18	13	9	22	14	10	5	7	12	2
2006–07	Lowell Devils	AHL	24	4	5	9	4	—	—	—	—	—
2006–07	Trenton Titans	ECHL	48	36	31	67	10	1	0	0	0	0
2007–08	Lowell Devils	AHL	52	5	6	11	18	—	—	—	—	—
AHL totals			290	44	47	91	104	7	1	0	1	2
NHL totals			3	0	0	0	0	—	—	—	—	—

=== International ===
Year	Team	Event	GP	G	A	Pts	PIM
1999	United States	WJC	6	0	1	1	4
Junior totals			6	0	1	1	4

== Awards and honors ==
Award	Year
Hockey East All-Tournament Team	2001

Awards and achievements
Preceded by Mike Lephart	Hockey East Best Defensive Forward; 2001–02	Succeeded by Mark Mullen
