= J. D. Forrest =

American ice hockey player and coach

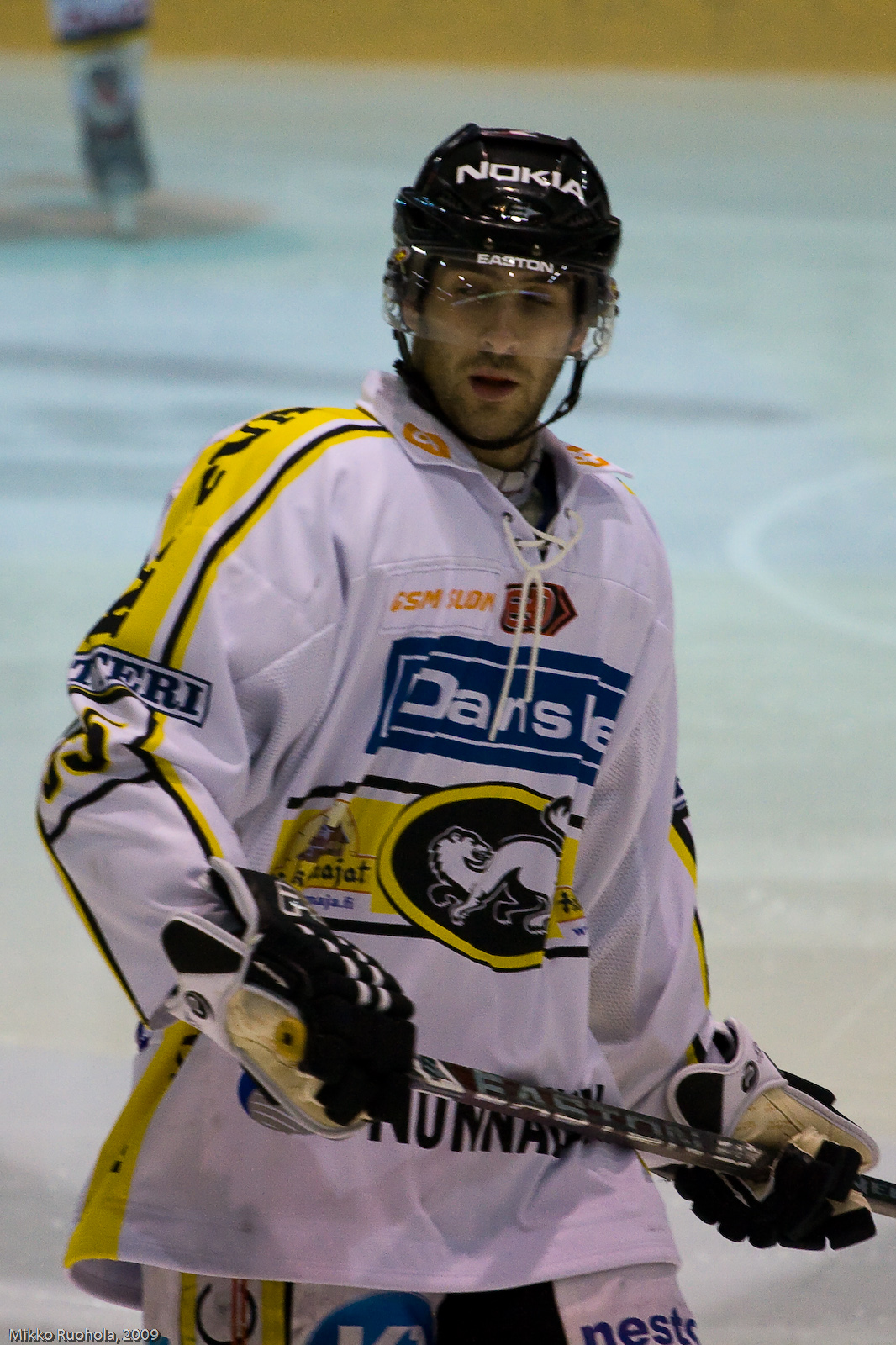
- Forrest with Oulun Kärpät in 2009
- Born: April 15, 1981 (age 45) Auburn, New York, U.S.
- Height: 5 ft 9 in (175 cm)
- Weight: 180 lb (82 kg; 12 st 12 lb)
- Position: Defense
- Shot: Left
- Played for: SaiPa Lappeenranta; Ässät Pori; Kärpät Oulu; Jokerit Helsinki; Kloten Flyers; Malmö Redhawks; Augsburger Panther
- NHL draft: 181st overall, 2000; Carolina Hurricanes
- Playing career: 2004–2014

Justin David "J.D." Forrest (born April 15, 1981) is an American professional ice hockey coach and former professional defenseman.

== Playing career ==
Forrest spent four seasons playing for Boston College, where he was part of the team that won the NCAA Championship in 2001 and earned Hockey East All-Rookie Team honors. In 2003, he was named a Second-Team All-American by the ACHA and served as an alternate captain during his final two seasons before graduating in 2004. Following college, he launched a long professional hockey career that included time in North America and Europe, playing in Finland's Liiga, Switzerland's National League A, and the American Hockey League. He concluded his playing career in 2014 after spending two seasons with the Augsburger Panther in Germany's Deutsche Eishockey Liga.

== Coaching career ==
After retiring from professional hockey, Forrest began his coaching career as an assistant with the USA Hockey National Team Development Program, where he helped lead the team to a gold medal at the 2015 IIHF Under-18 World Championship. He then spent a season coaching the affiliate team of EC Red Bull Salzburg in Austria. On August 2, 2016, the Pittsburgh Penguins appointed him as an assistant coach for their AHL affiliate, the Wilkes-Barre/Scranton Penguins.

He was promoted to the position of head coach on September 11, 2020.

On April 28, 2024, the Penguins announced that they would not be extending the contract of Wilkes-Barre/Scranton Head Coach J.D. Forrest. He subsequently joined the Syracuse Crunch as an assistant coach.

== Awards and honors ==
Award	Year
All-Hockey East Rookie Team	2000–01
All-Hockey East Second Team	2002–03
AHCA East Second-Team All-American	2002–03

== Career statistics ==
=== Regular season and playoffs ===
			Regular season					Playoffs
Season	Team	League	GP	G	A	Pts	PIM	GP	G	A	Pts	PIM
1997–98	US NTDP U18	NAHL	41	2	16	18	20	5	0	1	1	2
1997–98	US NTDP Juniors	USHL	5	2	0	2	17	—	—	—	—	—
1998–99	US NTDP U18	NAHL	2	1	0	1	4	—	—	—	—	—
1998–99	US NTDP Juniors	USHL	48	5	21	26	34	—	—	—	—	—
1999–2000	US NTDP U18	NAHL	49	6	28	34	46	3	0	0	0	6
1999–2000	US NTDP Juniors	USHL	8	0	0	0	2	—	—	—	—	—
2000–01	Boston College	HE	38	6	16	22	40	—	—	—	—	—
2001–02	Boston College	HE	35	8	19	27	28	—	—	—	—	—
2002–03	Boston College	HE	34	6	25	31	28	—	—	—	—	—
2003–04	Boston College	HE	37	4	13	17	26	—	—	—	—	—
2004–05	SaiPa	SM-liiga	53	7	12	19	44	—	—	—	—	—
2005–06	Ässät	SM-liiga	43	6	5	11	69	14	0	4	4	14
2007–08	Albany River Rats	AHL	19	3	7	10	16	—	—	—	—	—
2007–08	Florida Everblades	ECHL	12	1	7	8	6	—	—	—	—	—
2007–08	Elmira Jackals	ECHL	2	0	0	0	2	—	—	—	—	—
2007–08	Worcester Sharks	AHL	16	1	4	5	10	—	—	—	—	—
2008–09	Kärpät	SM-liiga	52	5	28	33	60	15	3	3	6	10
2009–10	Kärpät	SM-liiga	17	2	5	7	20	—	—	—	—	—
2009–10	Kloten Flyers	NLA	30	7	20	27	18	10	0	5	5	2
2010–11	Kärpät	SM-liiga	41	3	20	23	22	7	0	1	1	4
2011–12	Malmö Redhawks	Allsv	50	4	13	17	32	1	0	0	0	0
2012–13	Augsburger Panther	DEL	32	2	13	15	24	2	0	0	0	2
2013–14	Augsburger Panther	DEL	51	4	18	22	20	—	—	—	—	—
SM-liiga totals			206	23	70	93	215	36	3	8	11	28

=== International ===
Year	Team	Event	GP	G	A	Pts	PIM
1999	United States	WJC18	6	1	2	3	10
2001	United States	WJC	7	1	1	2	8
Junior totals			13	2	3	5	18
