= Jeff Giuliano =

American ice hockey player

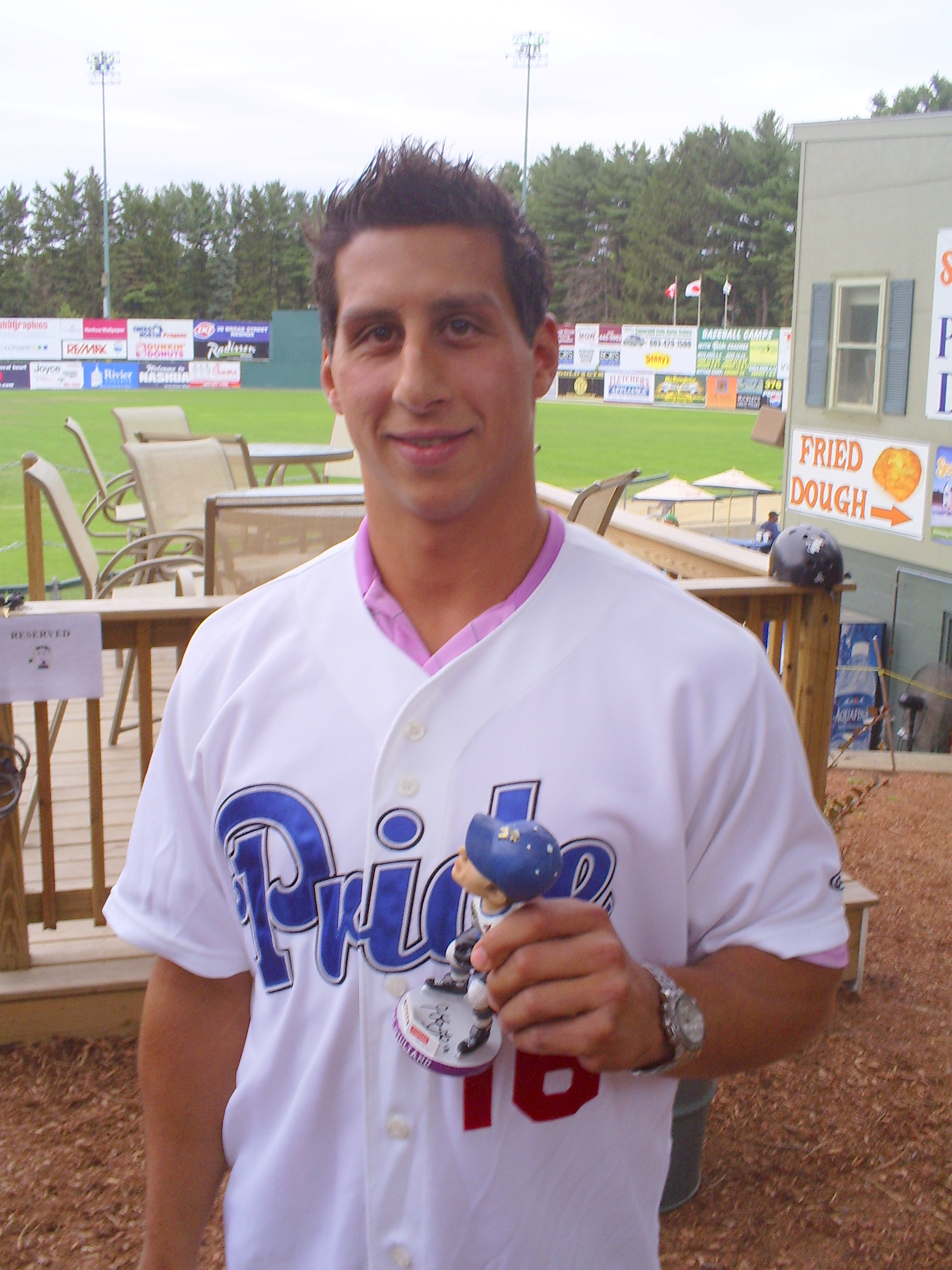
- Giuliano in 2009

Current position
- Title: Assistant coach
- Team: New Hampshire
- Conference: Hockey East

Biographical details
- Born: June 20, 1979 (age 47); Nashua, NH, USA
- Education: Boston College

Playing career
- 2002-2008: Manchester Monarchs
- 2008-2009: Dynamo Minsk
- 2009-2015: Iserlohn Roosters
- Position: Left wing

Coaching career (HC unless noted)
- 2015-2018: Manchester Monarchs (assistant)
- 2018- present: New Hampshire (assistant)

Jeffrey Joseph Giuliano (born June 20, 1979) is an American former ice hockey left winger who played 101 games in the National Hockey League for the Los Angeles Kings during the 2005–06 and 2007–08 seasons. The rest of his career, which lasted from 2002 to 2015, was spent in the minor leagues and then in the Deutsche Eishockey Liga.

== Playing career ==
As a youth, Giuliano played in the 1993 Quebec International Pee-Wee Hockey Tournament with the Connecticut Yankees minor ice hockey team.

Giuliano played high school hockey with St. Paul's School (Concord, New Hampshire). He attended Boston College where he developed a reputation for speed, play-making, work ethic, reliability, ruggedness, judgment, and leadership on and off the ice. While at Boston College, his team played for the national championship twice, winning it in 2001. Giuliano was elected captain of the 2002 squad.

After graduating from Boston College, Giuliano played for the Reading Royals, the ECHL affiliate of the Los Angeles Kings. He moved up quickly to the Manchester Monarchs, the Kings' AHL affiliate, where he played for several successful seasons. Giuliano made his NHL debut for the Kings during the 2005–06 NHL season and went on to play 101 games over two seasons with the team.

In 2008, Giuliano joined the Belarusian side HC Dinamo Minsk of the newly formed Kontinental Hockey League. In 2009, he joined the Iserlohn Roosters of the Deutsche Eishockey Liga (DEL).

== Post-playing career ==
After six seasons with the Roosters, Giuliano retired from professional hockey and returned to America to accept an assistant coaching position with the Manchester Monarchs of the ECHL on August 18, 2015.

== Career statistics ==
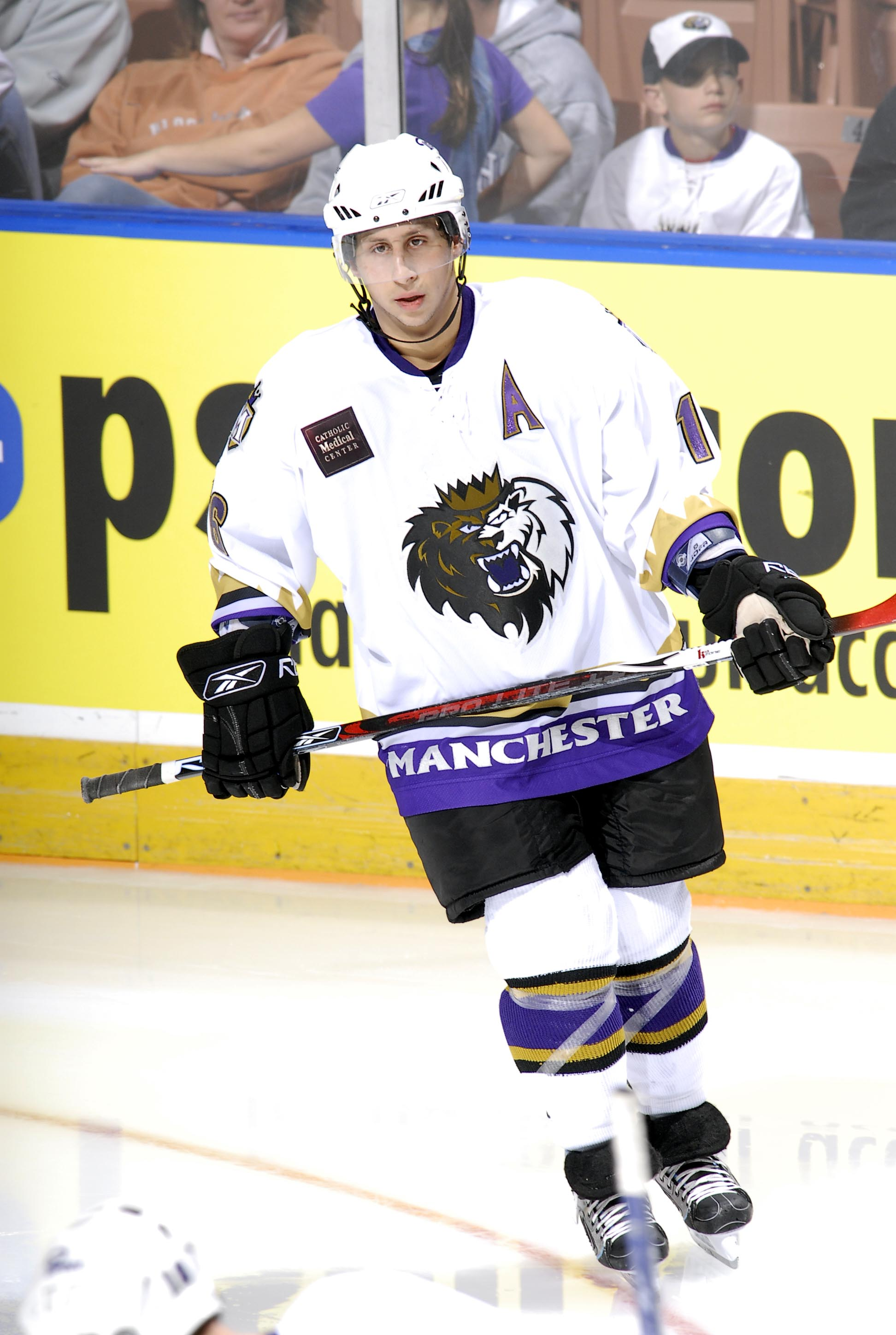
Giuliano with the Manchester Monarchs in 2006

=== Regular season and playoffs ===
			Regular season					Playoffs
Season	Team	League	GP	G	A	Pts	PIM	GP	G	A	Pts	PIM
1998–99	Boston College	HE	43	5	15	20	10	—	—	—	—	—
1999–00	Boston College	HE	42	10	13	23	16	—	—	—	—	—
2000–01	Boston College	HE	43	14	21	35	28	—	—	—	—	—
2001–02	Boston College	HE	38	11	24	35	14	—	—	—	—	—
2002–03	Reading Royals	ECHL	38	7	23	30	6	—	—	—	—	—
2002–03	Manchester Monarchs	AHL	47	4	11	15	8	3	1	0	1	0
2003–04	Manchester Monarchs	AHL	80	6	14	20	16	1	0	0	0	0
2004–05	Manchester Monarchs	AHL	69	8	16	24	21	2	0	0	0	0
2005–06	Los Angeles Kings	NHL	48	3	4	7	26	—	—	—	—	—
2005–06	Manchester Monarchs	AHL	19	5	6	11	17	7	3	1	4	2
2006–07	Manchester Monarchs	AHL	35	4	10	14	27	16	3	3	6	12
2007–08	Los Angeles Kings	NHL	53	0	6	6	14	—	—	—	—	—
2007–08	Manchester Monarchs	AHL	23	3	1	4	14	—	—	—	—	—
2008–09	Dynamo Minsk	KHL	45	1	5	30	—	—	—	—	—
2009–10	Iserlohn Roosters	DEL	39	6	9	15	45	—	—	—	—	—
2010–11	Iserlohn Roosters	DEL	49	5	14	19	39	—	—	—	—	—
2011–12	Iserlohn Roosters	DEL	48	11	17	28	30	2	0	2	2	2
2012–13	Iserlohn Roosters	DEL	47	11	11	22	45	—	—	—	—	—
2013–14	Iserlohn Roosters	DEL	49	6	16	22	24	9	2	1	3	2
2014–15	Iserlohn Roosters	DEL	13	3	2	5	2	—	—	—	—	—
AHL totals			273	30	58	88	103	29	7	4	11	14
DEL totals			245	42	69	111	185	11	2	3	5	4
NHL totals			101	3	10	13	40	—	—	—	—	—
