= Jim Logue =

American ice hockey player

- Born: March 25, 1939 (age 87) Melrose, Massachusetts, U.S.
- Height: 6 ft 0 in (183 cm)
- Weight: 195 lb (88 kg; 13 st 13 lb)
- Position: Goaltender
- National team: United States
- Playing career: 1954–1969 Coaching career

Biographical details
- Education: Boston College

Coaching career (HC unless noted)
- 1969–1978: Merrimack (asst.)
- 1972–1976: Team USA (asst.)
- 1980–1986: North Andover HS
- 1983–1988: Merrimack (asst.)
- 1991–1993: Salem State (asst.)
- 1993–2013: Boston College (asst.)

James Brian Logue (born March 25, 1939) is an American former ice hockey goaltender, Olympian, and coach.

== Career ==
After graduating from Boston College in 1961, Logue played with Team USA at the 1968 Winter Olympics held in Grenoble, France. He appeared in only one game, allowing 10 goals on 42 shots in 40 minutes against the gold medal-winning Soviet team.

Logue ended his playing days shortly thereafter and began his coaching career as an assistant with Merrimack. Logue worked off and on with the Warriors for nearly 20 years, helping the program win numerous championships, including the inaugural Division II tournament in 1978. During that time Logue also served as a coach for the US National Team and as the head coach for North Andover High School.

In 1988, Logue helped Merrimack become the first non-D-I club to make an appearance in the Division I tournament and even went so far as to win their first-round match against Northeastern. Logue stepped down after the season but his retirement didn't last long as he was back behind the bench for Salem State three years later.

In 1993, Logue got an opportunity to return to his alma mater and became an assistant under Steve Cedorchuk. While Cedorchuk was replaced by Jerry York a year later, Logue remained in his position and helped rebuild the program into a national power. After being made an associate head coach, Logue worked with several highly-touted goaltending prospects including Scott Clemmensen, Cory Schneider, and John Muse. In 2001, Logue was finally able to help the Eagles win a National Championship, ending a 52-year drought. Logue was also behind the bench for BC's next three championships, won in 2008, '10, and '12. After 20 years with the Eagles, Logue announced his retirement in the summer of 2013.

== Career statistics ==
=== Regular season and playoffs ===
			Regular season										Playoffs
Season	Team	League	GP	W	L	T	MIN	GA	SO	GAA	SV%	GP	W	L	MIN	GA	SO	GAA	SV%
1958–59	Boston College	NCAA	—	—	—	—	—	—	—	—	—	—	—	—	—	—	—	—	—
1959–60	Boston College	NCAA	—	—	—	—	—	—	—	—	—	—	—	—	—	—	—	—	—
1960–61	Boston College	NCAA	—	—	—	—	—	—	—	2.17	—	—	—	—	—	—	—	—	—
1961–62	United States National Team	Intl	3	—	—	—	—	—	—	3.85	—	—	—	—	—	—	—	—	—

=== International ===
Year	Team	Event	Finish	GP	W	L	MIN	GA	SO	GAA	SV%
1968	United States	OG	6th	1	0	1	40	10	0	15.00	.762
