= Tony Voce =

American ice hockey player (1980–2024)

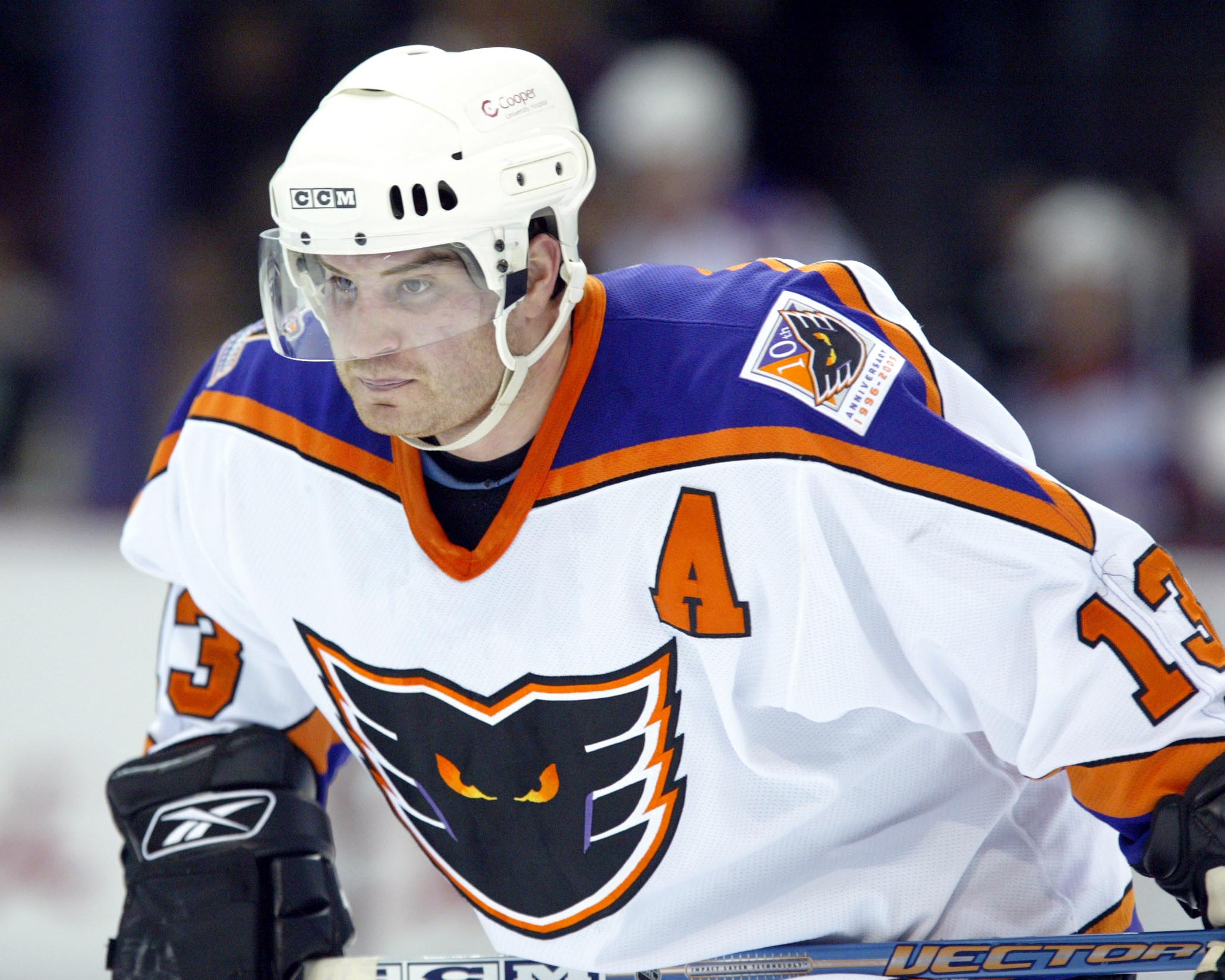
- Voce with the Philadelphia Phantoms in 2005
- Born: October 30, 1980; Philadelphia, Pennsylvania, U.S.
- Died: July 8, 2024 (aged 43); Philadelphia, Pennsylvania, U.S.
- Height: 5 ft 8 in (173 cm)
- Weight: 188 lb (85 kg; 13 st 6 lb)
- Position: Left wing
- Shot: Left
- Played for: Grizzlys Wolfsburg; Ilves; Graz 99ers
- NHL draft: Undrafted
- Playing career: 2004–2010

Anthony Francis Voce (October 30, 1980 – July 8, 2024) was an American professional ice hockey player. Voce was the first Philadelphia native to play for the Philadelphia Flyers organization.

== Playing career ==
Voce played college hockey at Boston College. In his four years there, he recorded 90 goals and 77 assists to go along with 207 penalty minutes. As a senior, he finished second in the nation in goals in the NCAA, and for the second time (also as a sophomore) was awarded the Norman F. Bailey Award as team MVP. In addition, he was named to the All-Hockey East First Team and was an AHCA First Team All-American.

After being signed as an undrafted free agent by his hometown team, the Philadelphia Flyers, he was sent to their minor league affiliate, the Philadelphia Phantoms. Voce was a member of the 2004–05 Calder Cup winning Philadelphia Phantoms team. He became one of the team's top goal-scorers, totaling 50 goals in two years as a member of the Phantoms before being loaned to Grand Rapids.

Voce left North America to sign with Ilves of the SM-liiga for the 2007–08 season. He was released after playing five games for them. Three days later, he signed with Grizzlys Wolfsburg of the German Deutsche Eishockey Liga (DEL).

On March 17, 2008, he signed with the DEL's Straubing Tigers and transferred November 28, 2008 to EC Graz 99ers of the Erste Bank Hockey League. After two weeks in Austria, he was released by the team.

== Death ==
Voce died of a heart attack on July 8, 2024, at the age of 43.

== Career statistics ==
| | | | Regular season | | | | | Playoffs |
| Season | Team | League | GP | G | A | Pts | PIM | GP | G | A | Pts | PIM |
|---|---|---|---|---|---|---|---|---|---|---|---|---|
| 2000–01 | Boston College | HE | 42 | 12 | 14 | 26 | 40 | — | — | — | — | — |
| 2001–02 | Boston College | HE | 38 | 26 | 22 | 48 | 65 | — | — | — | — | — |
| 2002–03 | Boston College | HE | 37 | 23 | 23 | 46 | 56 | — | — | — | — | — |
| 2003–04 | Boston College | HE | 42 | 29 | 18 | 47 | 48 | — | — | — | — | — |
| 2004–05 | Philadelphia Phantoms | AHL | 73 | 22 | 17 | 39 | 85 | 4 | 0 | 0 | 0 | 4 |
| 2005–06 | Philadelphia Phantoms | AHL | 67 | 28 | 27 | 55 | 87 | — | — | — | — | — |
| 2006–07 | Philadelphia Phantoms | AHL | 41 | 8 | 13 | 21 | 44 | — | — | — | — | — |
| 2006–07 | Grand Rapids Griffins | AHL | 25 | 4 | 6 | 10 | 37 | 7 | 3 | 2 | 5 | 6 |
| 2007–08 | Ilves | Liiga | 5 | 0 | 2 | 2 | 6 | — | — | — | — | — |
| 2007–08 | Grizzlys Wolfsburg | DEL | 41 | 13 | 15 | 28 | 64 | — | — | — | — | — |
| 2008–09 | Graz 99ers | EBEL | 6 | 2 | 1 | 3 | 20 | — | — | — | — | — |
| 2009–10 | Ontario Reign | ECHL | 58 | 23 | 16 | 39 | 69 | — | — | — | — | — |
| AHL totals | | | 206 | 62 | 63 | 125 | 253 | 11 | 3 | 2 | 5 | 10 |

== Awards and honors ==
| Award | Year |
|---|---|
| Hockey East All-Tournament Team | 2001 |
| All-Hockey East First Team | 2001–02; 2003–04 |
| AHCA East First-Team All-American | 2003–04 |

Awards and achievements
| Preceded by Ben Eaves | Hockey East Scoring Champion; 2003–04 (with Ryan Shannon) | Succeeded by Jason Guerriero |
