= Jerry York =

American ice hockey coach

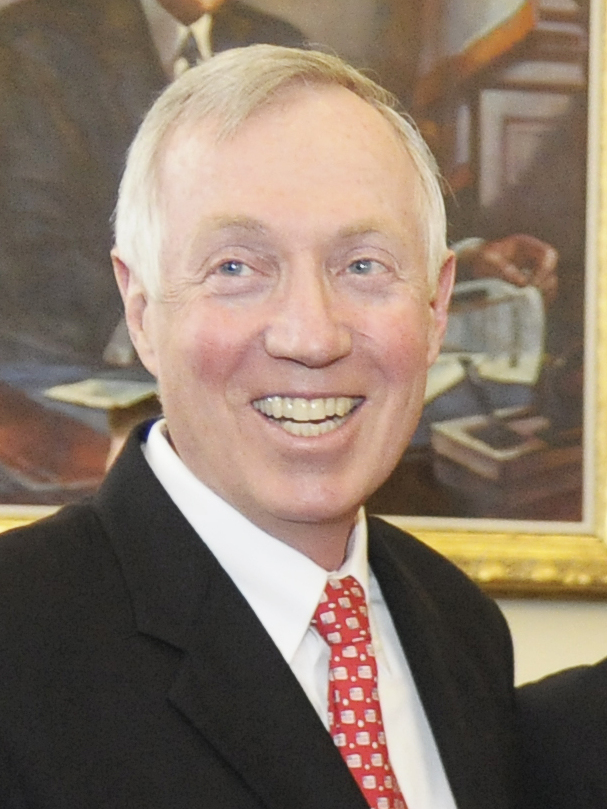
- York at the Massachusetts State House in 2008

Biographical details
- Born: July 25, 1945 (age 81); Watertown, Massachusetts, U.S.

Playing career
- 1963–1967: Boston College
- Position: Center

Coaching career (HC unless noted)
- 1972–1979: Clarkson
- 1979–1994: Bowling Green
- 1994–2022: Boston College

Head coaching record
- Overall: 1,123–682–128 (.614)
- Tournaments: 41–24–1 (.629)

Accomplishments and honors

Championships
- 1984 NCAA Champion; 2001 NCAA Champion; 2008 NCAA Champion; 2010 NCAA Champion; 2012 NCAA Champion; ECAC regular season champion (1977); 4× CCHA regular season champion (1982, 1983, 1984, 1987); CCHA Tournament Champion (1988); 11× Hockey East regular season champion (2001, 2003, 2004, 2005, 2011, 2012, 2014, 2016, 2017, 2018, 2020); 9× Hockey East Tournament Champion (1998, 1999, 2001, 2005, 2007, 2008, 2010, 2011, 2012); 9× Beanpot Champion (2001, 2004, 2008, 2010–2014, 2016)

Awards
- 1977 Spencer Penrose Division I Coach of the Year; 1982 CCHA Coach of the Year; 5× Hockey East Coach of the Year (2004, 2011, 2014, 2018, 2021); 2010 Lester Patrick Trophy; 2019 Hockey Hall of Fame

Jerry York (born July 25, 1945) is an American former ice hockey coach who was the men's ice hockey coach at Boston College. York is the winningest coach in NCAA hockey, and leads the all-time list as the only Division I head coach with over 1,000 wins. He has won the NCAA Division I Men's Ice Hockey title five times as a coach, at Bowling Green State University in 1984 and at Boston College in 2001, 2008, 2010 and 2012, tying him with Murray Armstrong for second-most all-time behind only Vic Heyliger (6). York received the Spencer Penrose Trophy for being named Division I Coach of the Year in 1977. On June 25, 2019, York was elected into the Hockey Hall of Fame in the Builders Category.

== Background ==
The eighth of ten children, York is a "Triple Eagle", having graduated from Boston College High School in 1963 and Boston College in 1967, as well as earning a Master's degree from Boston College.

== Coaching career ==
York's coaching career began at Clarkson as an assistant coach. In 1972, York became the head coach when he took over the job from Len Ceglarski who had accepted the head coaching job at BC. York coached at Clarkson for 7 years, winning the ECAC regular season title in 1977.

In 1979 York moved from Clarkson to Bowling Green, taking over from Ron Mason. In 15 seasons at the school, he compiled nine 20-win seasons, 4 CCHA regular-season titles, 1 CCHA tournament title, 6 NCAA tournament appearances, and a National Title in 1984.

York returned to his alma mater, Boston College, in 1994, and began rebuilding the program. In the 1997–98 season, Boston College surprised the college hockey world by reaching the NCAA title game. In 27 years, York has led the Eagles to eleven Hockey East regular-season titles in 2001, 2003, 2004, 2005, 2011, 2012, 2014, 2016, 2017, 2018, and 2020, nine Hockey East tournament titles in 1998, 1999, 2001, 2005, 2007, 2008, 2010, 2011, and 2012, nine Beanpot titles in 2001, 2004, 2008, 2010, 2011, 2012, 2013, 2014, and 2016, eighteen NCAA tournament appearances, twelve Frozen Four appearances and four national titles. The four championships came in 2001 by beating North Dakota, 2008 over Notre Dame, 2010 against Wisconsin, and in 2012 defeating Ferris State University. His 2001 title was BC's first national title since 1949, and only the second in the storied program's then 81-year history. York's Boston College teams have had twelve Frozen Four appearances in fifteen years from 1998 to 2016. During that span, Boston College has played in the national championship game eight times. Boston College lost four national title games – to Michigan in 1998, to North Dakota in 2000, to Wisconsin in 2006, and to Michigan State in 2007.

During the 2014–15 season at Boston College, York passed legendary John "Snooks" Kelley, whom he played under as a student-athlete, for most programs win all-time at Boston College. Kelley had 501 victories for the Eagles.

York became the winningest men's college ice hockey coach in history after passing Ron Mason's 924 wins on December 29, 2012.

On January 22, 2016, York earned his 1000th career win as a head coach, becoming the first coach in NCAA Division I ice hockey history to reach this milestone. He again achieved a new milestone of 1,100 wins on January 23, 2021.

After coaching his 28th year at Boston College and 50th year overall in the NCAA, York announced his retirement on April 14, 2022.

== Head coaching record ==
Record table
Season	Team	Overall	Conference	Standing	Postseason
Clarkson Golden Knights (ECAC Hockey) (1972–1979)
1972–73	Clarkson	18–15–0	11–9–0	T-6th	ECAC Third-place game (win)
1973–74	Clarkson	12–14–1	9–11–1	9th	
1974–75	Clarkson	13–15–1	9–9–1	8th	ECAC Quarterfinals
1975–76	Clarkson	18–12–1	16–8–1	4th	ECAC Quarterfinals
1976–77	Clarkson	26–8–0	19–4–0	1st	ECAC Third-place game (loss)
1977–78	Clarkson	19–11–0	16–7–0	3rd	ECAC Quarterfinals
1978–79	Clarkson	19–12–0	13–9–0	5th	ECAC Quarterfinals
Clarkson:		125–87–3 (.588)	93–57–3 (.618)		
Bowling Green Falcons (CCHA) (1979–1994)
1979–80	Bowling Green	16–20–2	9–11–0	4th	CCHA Semifinals
1980–81	Bowling Green	13–24–2	10–12–0	4th	CCHA Semifinals
1981–82	Bowling Green	27–13–2	20–7–1	1st	NCAA Quarterfinals
1982–83	Bowling Green	28–8–4	24–5–3	1st	CCHA runner-up
1983–84	Bowling Green	34–8–2	22–4–2	1st	NCAA Champion
1984–85	Bowling Green	21–21–0	17–15–0	4th	CCHA consolation game (loss)
1985–86	Bowling Green	28–14–0	23–9–0	2nd	CCHA consolation game (win)
1986–87	Bowling Green	33–10–2	24–6–2	1st	NCAA Quarterfinals
1987–88	Bowling Green	30–13–2	19–11–2	2nd	NCAA Quarterfinals
1988–89	Bowling Green	26–18–3	15–14–3	5th	NCAA First round
1989–90	Bowling Green	25–17–2	20–10–2	3rd	NCAA First round
1990–91	Bowling Green	15–23–2	13–17–2	6th	CCHA Quarterfinals
1991–92	Bowling Green	8–21–5	7–20–5	9th	
1992–93	Bowling Green	19–21–1	12–7–1	7th	CCHA Second round
1993–94	Bowling Green	19–17–2	15–13–2	6th	CCHA Second round
Bowling Green:		342–248–31 (.576)	250–161–20 (.603)		
Boston College Eagles (Hockey East) (1994–2022)
1994–95	Boston College	11–22–2	8–14–2	8th	Hockey East Play-In
1995–96	Boston College	16–17–3	12–10–2	5th	Hockey East Quarterfinals
1996–97	Boston College	15–19–4	9–12–3	6th	Hockey East Third-place game (Tie)
1997–98	Boston College	28–9–5	15–5–4	2nd	NCAA runner-up
1998–99	Boston College	27–12–4	15–7–2	3rd	NCAA Frozen Four
1999–00	Boston College	29–12–1	15–8–1	3rd	NCAA runner-up
2000–01	Boston College	33–8–2	17–5–2	1st	NCAA Champion
2001–02	Boston College	18–18–2	10–13–1	6th	Hockey East Quarterfinals
2002–03	Boston College	24–11–4	16–6–2	T-1st	NCAA Regional Finals
2003–04	Boston College	29–9–4	17–4–3	1st	NCAA Frozen Four
2004–05	Boston College	26–7–7	14–3–7	1st	NCAA Regional Finals
2005–06	Boston College	26–13–3	17–8–2	2nd	NCAA runner-up
2006–07	Boston College	29–12–1	18–8–1	2nd	NCAA runner-up
2007–08	Boston College	25–11–8	11–9–7	4th	NCAA Champion
2008–09	Boston College	18–14–5	11–11–5	6th	Hockey East Semifinals
2009–10	Boston College	29–10–3	16–8–3	2nd	NCAA Champion
2010–11	Boston College	30–8–1	20–6–1	1st	NCAA regional semifinals
2011–12	Boston College	33–10–1	19–7–1	1st	NCAA Champion
2012–13	Boston College	22–12–4	15–9–3	2nd	NCAA regional semifinals
2013–14	Boston College	28–8–4	16–2–2	1st	NCAA Frozen Four
2014–15	Boston College	21–14–3	12–7–3	T-2nd	NCAA regional semifinals
2015–16	Boston College	28–8–5	15–2–5	T-1st	NCAA Frozen Four
2016–17	Boston College	21–15–4	13–6–3	T-1st	Hockey East Finals
2017–18	Boston College	20–14–3	18–6–0	1st	Hockey East Semifinals
2018–19	Boston College	14–22–3	10–11–3	7th	Hockey East Runner-Up
2019–20	Boston College	24–8–2	17–6–1	1st	Tournament cancelled due to COVID-19
2020–21	Boston College	17–6–1	16–4–1	1st	NCAA Regional Finals
2021–22	Boston College	15–18–5	9–12–3	8th	Hockey East Quarterfinals
Boston College:		656–347–94 (.641)	388–209–73 (.634)		
Total:		1123–682–128 (.614)	731–427–96 (.621)		
National champion Postseason invitational champion Conference regular season champion Conference regular season and conference tournament champion Division regular season champion Division regular season and conference tournament champion Conference tournament champion

== Awards and honors ==
Award	Year
All-ECAC Hockey Second Team	1966–67
AHCA East All-American	1966–67
ECAC Hockey All-Tournament Second Team	1967
Hockey Hall of Fame	2019

== Personal life ==
York is married to fellow Boston College graduate Bobbie (née O'Brien). They have two adult children.

== See also ==
- List of college men's ice hockey coaches with 400 wins

Awards and achievements
Preceded by Doug Ferguson	NCAA Ice Hockey Scoring Champion; 1966–67 (with Herb Wakabayashi)	Succeeded by Delbert Dehate
Preceded by John MacInnes	Spencer Penrose Award; 1977–78	Succeeded by Jack Parker
Preceded by Rick Comley	CCHA Coach of the Year; 1981–82	Succeeded by Jerry Welsh
Preceded by Don Cahoon; Mark Dennehy/Dick Umile; Norm Bazin; Norm Bazin; Red Gendron	Bob Kullen Coach of the Year Award; 2003–04; 2010–11; 2013–14; 2017–18; 2020–21	Succeeded by Jack Parker; Norm Bazin; David Quinn; Greg Carvel; Jerry Keefe
