= Ben Eaves =

American ice hockey player

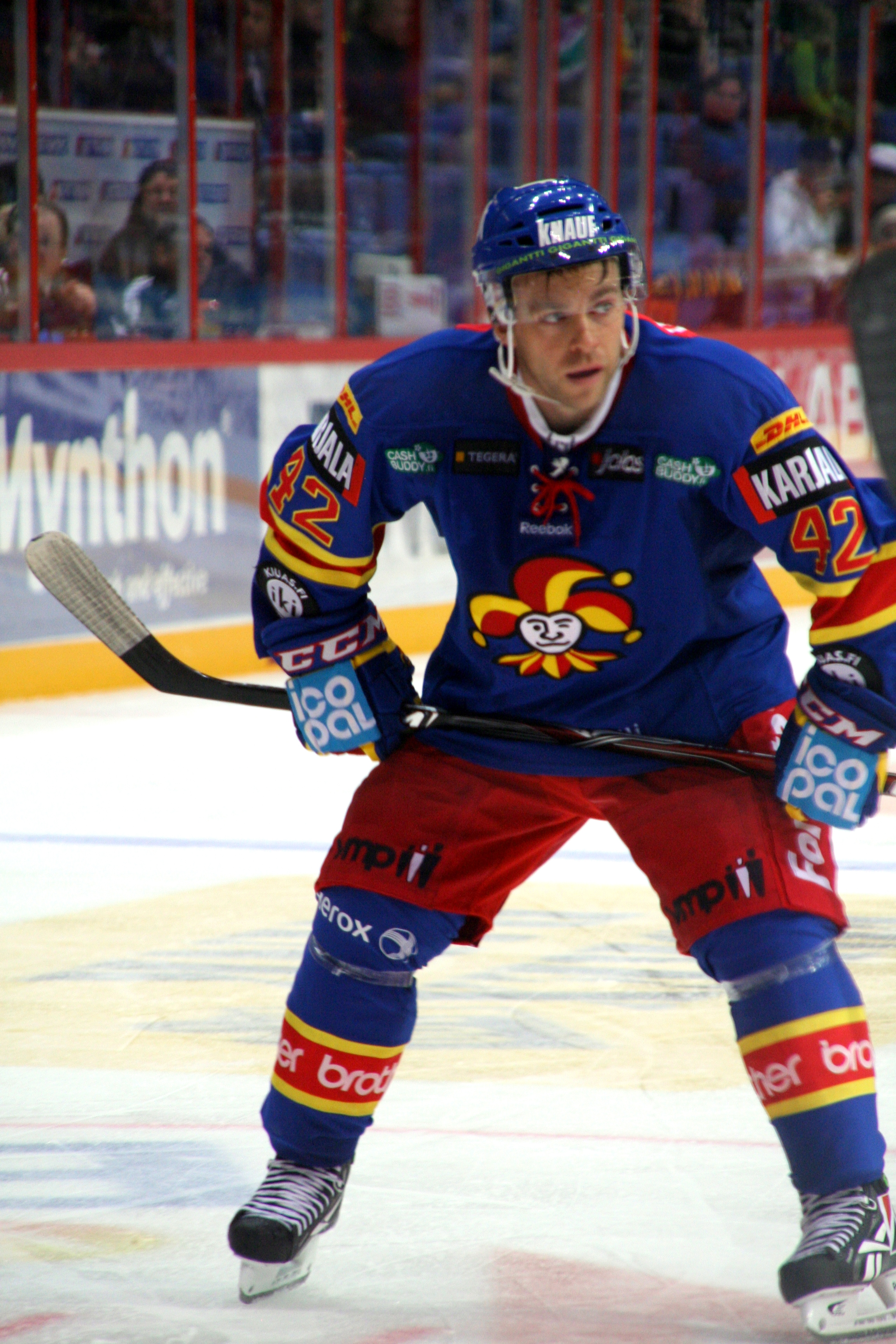
- Born: March 27, 1982 (age 44) Minneapolis, Minnesota, U.S.
- Height: 5 ft 8 in (173 cm)
- Weight: 179 lb (81 kg; 12 st 11 lb)
- Position: Center
- Played for: WBS Penguins; Espoo Blues; Milwaukee Admirals; Jokerit
- NHL draft: 131st overall, 2001; Pittsburgh Penguins
- Playing career: 2004–2013

Benjamin Coel Eaves (born March 27, 1982) is an American former professional ice hockey center. He is currently the strength and conditioning coach for the Cleveland Monsters of the American Hockey League (AHL) - where his father and former National Hockey League (NHL) player Mike Eaves is head coach. His brother Patrick played over 600 games in the NHL.

== Playing career ==
Eaves went to high school at Shattuck-St. Mary's school in Faribault, Minnesota. Eaves was drafted 131st overall by the Pittsburgh Penguins in the 2001 NHL entry draft. He spent four seasons at Boston College before turning pro in 2004. He signed an entry-level contract with the Penguins, but with the 2004–05 NHL season locked out and eventually cancelled, he split the season with the AHL's Wilkes-Barre/Scranton Penguins and the ECHL's Wheeling Nailers. He missed majority of 2005–06 season and entire 2006–07 season recovering from knee injuries.

In November 2007 he signed for the Espoo Blues in SM-liiga where he played rest of the season, although missing majority of it due to several injuries. He continued in the team for the following season. On 13 December 2008 he took a break due to injury, he made his comeback on 28 January 2009.

During the SM-liiga playoffs 2009 Ben Eaves broke the record of Kari Jalonen (season 1980/81) and Hannes Hyvönen (2007/08) for the most points scored during the playoffs (21 points). Eaves managed to score 24 points (4 goals and 20 assists) in 13 games with the Espoo Blues.

On July 21, 2009, Eaves signed a one-year, two-way contract with the Nashville Predators. On November 2, 2009, Eaves left the Predators' AHL affiliate Milwaukee Admirals and announced his retirement from hockey due to a lingering knee injury.

In the following season, however, he came out of retirement and joined Jokerit of Finnish SM-liiga in August 2010. In his return to Finland, Eaves successfully established himself amongst Jokerit's scoring forwards. He was selected as the MVP of the European trophy tournament of the 2011–12 season. In his third season with Jokerit, Eaves was again plagued by injury, suffering a concussion before briefly returning for the playoffs.

In preparation for the 2013–14 season with Jokerit, Eaves suffered a relapse of concussion symptoms and on August 16, 2013, announced his retirement from professional hockey for a second time, moving on to be assistant director of Hockey and U18 Coach for the Ohio AAA Blue Jackets in Columbus, Ohio.

In 2019, he joined the Cleveland Monsters of the American Hockey League (AHL) - where his father is the head coach - as the strength and conditioning coach.

== Career statistics ==
=== Regular season and playoffs ===
			Regular season					Playoffs
Season	Team	League	GP	G	A	Pts	PIM	GP	G	A	Pts	PIM
1999–2000	Shattuck–Saint Mary's	HS Prep	57	47	71	118		—	—	—	—	—
2000–01	Boston College	HE	41	13	26	39	12	—	—	—	—	—
2001–02	Boston College	HE	23	13	26	39	12	—	—	—	—	—
2002–03	Boston College	HE	36	18	39	57	18	—	—	—	—	—
2003–04	Boston College	HE	26	9	25	34	4	—	—	—	—	—
2004–05	Wilkes–Barre/Scranton Penguins	AHL	43	4	6	10	12	7	0	0	0	0
2004–05	Wheeling Nailers	ECHL	2	1	0	1	0	—	—	—	—	—
2005–06	Wilkes–Barre/Scranton Penguins	AHL	5	1	2	3	0	—	—	—	—	—
2007–08	Blues	SM-liiga	10	3	4	7	4	13	7	5	12	8
2008–09	Blues	SM-liiga	22	3	15	18	18	14	4	20	24	6
2009–10	Milwaukee Admirals	AHL	7	1	2	3	4	—	—	—	—	—
2010–11	Jokerit	SM-liiga	44	9	17	26	30	7	1	5	6	10
2011–12	Jokerit	SM-liiga	44	13	21	34	22	7	0	3	3	2
2012–13	Jokerit	SM-liiga	9	2	1	3	4	1	1	0	1	2
AHL totals			55	6	10	16	16	7	0	0	0	0
SM-liiga totals			130	30	58	88	78	42	13	33	46	28

=== International ===
Year	Team	Event	GP	G	A	Pts	PIM
2000	United States	WJC18	6	1	3	4	0
2002	United States	WJC	6	1	4	5	2
Junior totals			12	2	7	9	2

== Awards and honors ==
Award	Year
All-Hockey East Rookie Team	2000–01
All-Hockey East Second Team	2001–02
AHCA East Second-Team All-American	2001–02
All-Hockey East First Team	2002–03
AHCA East First-Team All-American	2002–03

Awards and achievements
Preceded by Darren Haydar	Hockey East Player of the Year (Shared With Mike Ayers); 2002–03	Succeeded by Steve Saviano
Preceded by Colin Hemingway	Hockey East Three-Stars Award (Shared With Joe Exter); 2002–03	Succeeded by Keni Gibson
Preceded by Darren Haydar	Hockey East Scoring Champion; 2002–03	Succeeded by Ryan Shannon / Tony Voce
