= 2009–10 Boston College Eagles men's ice hockey season =

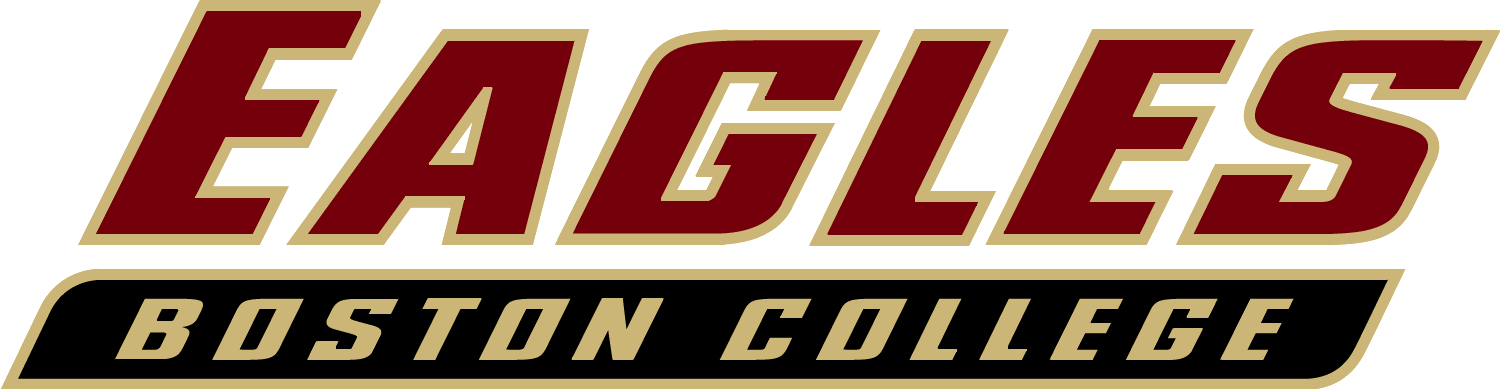

NCAA Division I National Champion Beanpot, Champion Hockey East Tournament, Champion NCAA Tournament, Champion
- Conference: 2nd Hockey East
- Home ice: Conte Forum

Rankings
- USA Today: #1
- USCHO.com: #3

Record
- Overall: 29–10–3
- Conference: 16–8–3
- Home: 14–2–0
- Road: 7–6–3
- Neutral: 8–2–0

Coaches and captains
- Head coach: Jerry York
- Assistant coaches: Mike Cavanaugh; Greg Brown; Jim Logue
- Captain: Matt Price
- Alternate captain(s): Ben Smith, Matt Lombardi

The 2009–10 Boston College Eagles men's ice hockey season was the 88th season of play for the program and 26th in the Hockey East. They represented Boston College in the 2009–10 NCAA Division I men's ice hockey season. They were coached by Jerry York, in his 16th season and played their home games at the Conte Forum. The team won the 2010 NCAA Division I men's ice hockey tournament, the 4th title in program history.

== Season ==
Boston College defeated Wisconsin 5–0 in the 2010 Frozen Four championship game, earning the school's fourth national championship and second title in three years. The Eagles defeated Alaska and Yale in the Northeast Regional in Worcester, earning them a berth in the Frozen Four to be played at Ford Field in Detroit. BC defeated Miami (OH) 7–1 in the national semifinal, the fourth time in five years that the Eagles ended the RedHawks' season in the NCAA tournament, before meeting Wisconsin in the final. The game was played before a record crowd of 37,592, the largest to attend an indoor hockey game. The 5–0 win in the national championship game was also Jerry York's 850th career victory.

After finishing second behind New Hampshire in the 2009–2010 Hockey East Regular Season, the Eagles won the 2010 Hockey East Tournament, defeating Maine 7–6 in overtime in the championship game, gaining their record ninth league title. BC also won the 2010 Beanpot Tournament, defeating rivals Boston University 4–3 in the final game to earn their fifteenth championship.

On January 8, 2010, Boston College and Boston University faced off at Fenway Park in the first men's college hockey game played at the home of the Boston Red Sox. BU edged BC 3–2 before a sellout crowd of 38,472.

== Recruiting ==
Boston College added nine freshmen for the 2009–10 season, including four defensemen, four forwards, and one goalie.

| Player | Position | Nationality | Notes |
|---|---|---|---|
| Brian Dumoulin | Defense | United States | Biddeford, ME; Selected 51st overall by CAR in 2009 draft. |
| Philip Samuelsson | Defense | United States | Scottsdale, AZ; Selected 61st overall by PIT in 2009 draft. |
| Patrick Wey | Defense | United States | Pittsburgh, PA; Selected 115th overall by WAS in 2009 draft. |
| Pat Mullane | Forward | United States | Wallingford, CT; Played alongside teammate Cam Atkinson at Avon Old Farms. |
| Brooks Dyroff | Forward | United States | Boulder, CO; Also an accomplished young filmmaker. |
| Chris Kreider | Forward | United States | Boxford, MA; Selected 19th overall by NYR in 2009 draft. |
| Steven Whitney | Forward | United States | Reading, MA; Younger brother of teammate Joe Whitney. |
| Patch Alber | Defense | United States | Clifton Park, NY; Earned EJHL All-Star recognition with Boston in 2008–09. |
| Parker Milner | Goalie | United States | Pittsburgh, PA; Voted Waterloo's Most Improved Player in 2008–09. |

== Departures ==
- Anthony Aiello, D – Graduation
- Tim Filangieri, D – Graduation
- Tim Kunes, D – Graduation
- Kyle Kucharski, F – Graduation
- Brock Bradford, F – Graduation
- Benn Ferriero, F – Graduation
- Andrew Orpik, F – Graduation
- Alex Kremer, G – left team
- Nick Petrecki, D – signed with SJS

== Roster ==
Goaltenders
| # | State | Player (Draft) | Catches | Year | Hometown | Previous team |
| 1 | (Massachusetts) | John Muse | L | Junior | East Falmouth, Massachusetts | Nobles |
| 30 | (Massachusetts) | Chris Venti | L | Sophomore | Needham, Massachusetts | Buckingham Browne & Nichols |
| 35 | (Pennsylvania) | Parker Milner | L | Freshman | Pittsburgh, Pennsylvania | Waterloo (USHL) |

Defensemen
| # | State | Player (Draft) | Shoots | Year | Hometown | Previous team |
| 2 | (Maine) | Brian Dumoulin (CAR, 51st overall 2009) | L | Freshman | Biddeford, Maine | New Hampshire (EJHL) |
| 4 | (Connecticut) | Tommy Cross – (BOS, 35th overall 2007) | L | Sophomore | Simsbury, Connecticut | Westminster School |
| 5 | (Arizona) | Philip Samuelsson (PIT, 61st overall 2009) | L | Freshman | Scottsdale, Arizona | Chicago (USHL) |
| 6 | (Pennsylvania) | Patrick Wey (WAS, 115th overall 2009) | R | Freshman | Pittsburgh, Pennsylvania | Waterloo (USHL) |
| 7 | (Minnesota) | Carl Sneep (PIT, 32nd overall 2006) | R | Senior | Nisswa, Minnesota | Brainerd |
| 8 | (Massachusetts) | Edwin Shea | R | Sophomore | Shrewsbury, Massachusetts | Boston (EJHL) |
| 23 | (Florida) | Malcolm Lyles | R | Sophomore | Miami Gardens, Florida | Deerfield Academy |
| 27 | (New York (state)) | Patch Alber | R | Freshman | Clifton Park, New York | Boston (EJHL) |

Forwards
| # | State | Player (Draft) | Shoots | Year | Hometown | Previous team |
| 9 | (Massachusetts) | Barry Almeida | L | Sophomore | Springfield, Massachusetts | Omaha (USHL) |
| 10 | (Massachusetts) | Jimmy Hayes (TOR, 60th overall 2008) | R | Sophomore | Dorchester, Massachusetts | Lincoln (USHL) |
| 11 | (Connecticut) | Pat Mullane | L | Freshman | Wallingford, Connecticut | Omaha (USHL) |
| 12 | (Connecticut) | Ben Smith – A (CHI, 169th overall 2008) | R | Senior | Avon, Connecticut | Westminster School |
| 13 | (Connecticut) | Cam Atkinson (CBJ, 157th overall 2008) | R | Sophomore | Greenwich, Connecticut | Avon Old Farms |
| 14 | (Colorado) | Brooks Dyroff | R | Freshman | Boulder, Colorado | Phillips Andover |
| 15 | (Massachusetts) | Joe Whitney | L | Junior | Reading, Massachusetts | Lawrence Academy |
| 17 | (Massachusetts) | Brian Gibbons | L | Junior | Braintree, Massachusetts | Salisbury School |
| 19 | (Massachusetts) | Chris Kreider (NYR, 19th overall 2009) | L | Freshman | Boxford, Massachusetts | Phillips Andover |
| 21 | (Massachusetts) | Steven Whitney | R | Freshman | Reading, Massachusetts | Lawrence Academy |
| 22 | (Massachusetts) | Paul Carey (COL, 135th overall 2007) | L | Sophomore | Weymouth, Massachusetts | Indiana (USHL) |
| 24 | (Massachusetts) | Matt Lombardi – A | R | Senior | Milton, Massachusetts | Governor's Academy |
| 25 | (Ontario) | Matt Price – C | R | Senior | Milton, Ontario | Milton Icehawks (OPJHL) |
| 28 | (Connecticut) | Tommy Atkinson | L | Sophomore | Greenwich, Connecticut | Avon Old Farms |

== Standings ==
2009–10 Hockey East standings
| | Conference | | | | | | | Overall | | | | | |
| | GP | W | L | T | PTS | GF | GA | GP | W | L | T | GF | GA |
|---|---|---|---|---|---|---|---|---|---|---|---|---|---|
| #11 New Hampshire† | 27 | 15 | 6 | 6 | 36 | 98 | 77 | 39 | 18 | 14 | 7 | 131 | 122 |
| #1 Boston College* | 27 | 16 | 8 | 3 | 35 | 99 | 61 | 42 | 29 | 10 | 3 | 171 | 104 |
| Boston University | 27 | 13 | 12 | 2 | 28 | 93 | 91 | 38 | 18 | 17 | 3 | 123 | 124 |
| Maine | 27 | 13 | 12 | 2 | 28 | 95 | 90 | 39 | 19 | 17 | 3 | 143 | 130 |
| Massachusetts–Lowell | 27 | 12 | 11 | 4 | 28 | 82 | 72 | 39 | 19 | 16 | 4 | 114 | 92 |
| Merrimack | 27 | 12 | 13 | 2 | 26 | 82 | 85 | 37 | 16 | 19 | 2 | 109 | 116 |
| Massachusetts | 27 | 13 | 14 | 0 | 26 | 72 | 86 | 36 | 18 | 18 | 0 | 105 | 117 |
| Vermont | 27 | 9 | 11 | 7 | 25 | 78 | 82 | 39 | 17 | 15 | 7 | 113 | 112 |
| Northeastern | 27 | 11 | 14 | 2 | 24 | 70 | 87 | 34 | 16 | 16 | 2 | 93 | 100 |
| Providence | 27 | 5 | 18 | 4 | 14 | 46 | 84 | 34 | 10 | 20 | 4 | 68 | 99 |
Championship: Boston College † indicates conference regular season champion * indicates conference tournament champion Final rankings: USA Today/USA Hockey Magazine Top 15 Poll

== Schedule and results ==
| Date | Time | Opponent^{#} | Rank^{#} | Site | TV | Decision | Result | Attendance | Record |
Exhibition
| October 4 | 5:00 pm | St. Francis Xavier* | | Conte Forum • Chestnut Hill, Massachusetts (Exhibition) | | Muse | W 4–1 | - | 0–0–0 |
| October 9 | 7:00 pm | USNTDP* | #12 | Conte Forum • Chestnut Hill, Massachusetts (Exhibition) | | Milner | W 6–3 | 2,709 | 0–0–0 |
Regular Season
| October 18 | 5:05 pm | at #11 Vermont* | #12 | Gutterson Fieldhouse • Burlington, Vermont | | Muse | L 1–4 | 4,003 | 0–1–0 (0–1–0) |
| October 23 | 7:35 pm | at #9 Notre Dame | #14 | Compton Family Ice Arena • Notre Dame, Indiana (Rivalry) | | Muse | W 3–2 | 2,997 | 1–1–0 |
| October 30 | 7:00 pm | Merrimack | #13 | Conte Forum • Chestnut Hill, Massachusetts | | Milner | W 4–3 | 3,842 | 2–1–0 (1–1–0) |
| November 1 | 4:00 pm | at Merrimack | #13 | J. Thom Lawler Rink • North Andover, Massachusetts | | Muse | L 3–5 | 2,660 | 2–2–0 (1–2–0) |
| November 6 | 7:05 pm | at New Hampshire | #16 | Whittemore Center • Durham, New Hampshire | | Muse | T 4–4 ^{OT} | 6,501 | 2–2–1 (1–2–1) |
| November 7 | 7:05 pm | Northeastern | #16 | Conte Forum • Chestnut Hill, Massachusetts | | Muse | W 5–1 | 5,238 | 3–2–1 (2–2–1) |
| November 14 | 7:00 pm | at #15 Vermont | #16 | Conte Forum • Chestnut Hill, Massachusetts | | Muse | W 7–1 | 4,988 | 4–2–1 (3–2–1) |
| November 15 | 4:05 pm | at #15 Vermont | #16 | Conte Forum • Chestnut Hill, Massachusetts | | Muse | L 2–3 | 4,472 | 4–3–1 (3–3–1) |
| November 20 | 7:07 pm | at Maine | #17 | Alfond Arena • Orono, Maine | | Milner | W 4–3 | 4,488 | 5–3–1 (4–3–1) |
| November 21 | 7:07 pm | at Maine | #17 | Alfond Arena • Orono, Maine | | Muse | T 3–3 ^{OT} | 4,709 | 5–3–2 (4–3–2) |
| November 27 | 5:05 pm | Clarkson* | #16 | Conte Forum • Chestnut Hill, Massachusetts | | Muse | W 6–5 | 5,689 | 6–3–2 |
| December 4 | 7:00 pm | at #9 Massachusetts | #15 | Mullins Center • Amherst, Massachusetts | | Milner | W 3–1 | 8,169 | 7–3–2 (5–3–2) |
| December 5 | 7:00 pm | at Boston University | #15 | Agganis Arena • Boston, Massachusetts (Rivalry) | | Muse | W 4–1 | 6,150 | 8–3–2 (6–3–2) |
| December 12 | 7:00 pm | at Harvard* | #10 | Bright-Landry Hockey Center • Boston, Massachusetts | | Milner | W 3–2 | 2,211 | 9–3–2 |
| December 12 | 7:05 pm | at Providence | #10 | Schneider Arena • Providence, Rhode Island | | Muse | W 3–1 | 2,279 | 10–3–2 (7–3–2) |
Denver Cup
| January 1 | 6:37 pm | vs. St. Lawrence* | #5 | Magness Arena • Denver, Colorado (Denver Cup game 1) | | Milner | L 2–5 | 5,250 | 10–4–2 |
| January 2 | 9:17 pm | vs. #2 Denver* | #5 | Magness Arena • Denver, Colorado (Denver Cup game 2) | | Muse | L 3–4 | 5,983 | 10–5–2 |
| January 8 | 7:55 pm | vs. Boston University | #7 | Fenway Park • Boston, Massachusetts (Rivalry) | | Muse | L 2–3 | 38,472 | 10–6–2 (7–4–2) |
| January 12 | 7:05 pm | Providence | #12 | Conte Forum • Chestnut Hill, Massachusetts | | Milner | W 4–1 | 3,162 | 11–6–2 (8–4–2) |
| January 15 | 7:05 pm | #16 Maine | #12 | Conte Forum • Chestnut Hill, Massachusetts | | Muse | W 6–1 | 6,324 | 12–6–2 (9–4–2) |
| January 22 | 7:30 pm | Boston University | #11 | Conte Forum • Chestnut Hill, Massachusetts (Rivalry) | | Milner | L 4–5 ^{OT} | 7,884 | 12–7–2 (9–5–2) |
| January 23 | 7:00 pm | at #19 Massachusetts–Lowell | #11 | Tsongas Center • Lowell, Massachusetts | | Muse | L 1–3 | 5,711 | 12–8–2 (9–6–2) |
| January 29 | 7:05 pm | Providence | #14 | Conte Forum • Chestnut Hill, Massachusetts | | Muse | W 5–2 | 5,832 | 13–8–2 (10–6–2) |
Beanpot
| February 1 | 5:08 pm | vs. Harvard* | #14 | TD Banknorth Garden • Boston, Massachusetts (Beanpot Semifinal) | | Muse | W 6–0 | 17,565 | 14–8–2 |
| February 5 | 7:00 pm | at #15 Massachusetts | #14 | Mullins Center • Amherst, Massachusetts | | Muse | W 7–1 | 8,389 | 15–8–2 (11–6–2) |
| February 8 | 8:11 pm | vs. Boston University* | #10 | TD Banknorth Garden • Boston, Massachusetts (Beanpot Championship; Rivalry) | | Muse | W 4–3 | 17,565 | 16–8–2 |
| February 12 | 7:00 pm | at #20 Massachusetts–Lowell | #10 | Tsongas Center • Lowell, Massachusetts | | Muse | L 1–4 | 4,915 | 16–9–2 (11–7–2) |
| February 13 | 7:00 pm | #20 Massachusetts–Lowell | #10 | Conte Forum • Chestnut Hill, Massachusetts | | Milner | W 2–1 | 5,715 | 17–9–2 (12–7–2) |
| February 19 | 7:00 pm | at Northeastern | #8 | Matthews Arena • Boston, Massachusetts | | Muse | L 2–3 | 4,666 | 17–10–2 (12–8–2) |
| February 21 | 3:05 pm | Northeastern | #8 | Conte Forum • Chestnut Hill, Massachusetts | | Milner | W 7–1 | 6,180 | 18–10–2 (13–8–2) |
| February 23 | 7:05 pm | Merrimack | #7 | Conte Forum • Chestnut Hill, Massachusetts | | Milner | W 7–0 | 1,816 | 19–10–2 (14–8–2) |
| February 26 | 7:05 pm | Massachusetts | #7 | Conte Forum • Chestnut Hill, Massachusetts | | Milner | W 2–1 ^{OT} | 4,872 | 20–10–2 (15–8–2) |
| March 5 | 7:31 pm | at #10 New Hampshire | #5 | Whittemore Center • Durham, New Hampshire | | Milner | T 3–3 ^{OT} | 6,501 | 20–10–3 (15–8–3) |
| March 6 | 7:05 pm | #10 New Hampshire | #5 | Conte Forum • Chestnut Hill, Massachusetts | | Muse | W 3–2 | 7,148 | 21–10–3 (16–8–3) |
Hockey East Tournament
| March 12 | 7:00 pm | Massachusetts* | #4 | Conte Forum • Chestnut Hill, Massachusetts (Hockey East Quarterfinals Game 1) | | Milner | W 6–5 | 2,888 | 22–10–3 |
| March 13 | 7:00 pm | Massachusetts* | #4 | Conte Forum • Chestnut Hill, Massachusetts (Hockey East Quarterfinals Game 2) | | Muse | W 5–2 | 3,148 | 23–10–3 |
| March 19 | 5:00 pm | vs. #14 Vermont* | #4 | TD Banknorth Garden • Boston, Massachusetts (Hockey East Semifinal) | | Muse | W 3–0 | - | 24–10–3 |
| March 20 | 7:05 pm | vs. #19 Maine* | #4 | TD Banknorth Garden • Boston, Massachusetts (Hockey East Championship) | | Muse | W 7–6 ^{OT} | 12,103 | 25–10–3 |
NCAA Tournament
| March 27 | 1:30 pm | vs. #17 Alaska* | #3 | DCU Center • Worcester, Massachusetts (Northeast Regional Semifinal) | | Muse | W 3–1 | 6,572 | 26–10–3 |
| March 28 | 5:30 pm | vs. #8 Yale* | #3 | DCU Center • Worcester, Massachusetts (Northeast Regional Final) | | Muse | W 9–7 | 6,054 | 27–10–3 |
| April 8 | 8:40 pm | vs. #1 Miami* | #3 | Ford Field • Detroit, Michigan (National Semifinal) | | Muse | W 7–1 | 34,954 | 28–10–3 |
| April 10 | 7:05 pm | vs. #5 Wisconsin* | #3 | Ford Field • Detroit, Michigan (National Championship) | | Muse | W 5–0 | 37,592 | 29–10–3 |
*Non-conference game. ^{#}Rankings from USCHO.com Poll. All times are in Eastern Time. Source:

== National Championship game ==
| April 10, 2010; 7:00 PM | Boston College | 5–0 (1–0, 0–0, 4–0) | Wisconsin | Ford Field, Detroit, MI; Attendance: 37,592 |

Game reference
| Referees: Matt Shegos, Mark Wilkins; Bruce Vida, Tony Molina |

Scoring summary
| Period | Team | Goal | Assist(s) | Time | Score |
|---|---|---|---|---|---|
| 1st | BC | Ben Smith (16) – GW PP | S. Whitney and J. Whitney | 12:57 | 1–0 BC |
| 2nd | None | | | | |
| 3rd | BC | Cam Atkinson (29) | J. Whitney and Gibbons | 41:38 | 2–0 BC |
| 3rd | BC | Chris Kreider (15) | Hayes and Samuelsson | 43:40 | 3–0 BC |
| 3rd | BC | Cam Atkinson (30) – PP | Gibbons and J. Whitney | 47:20 | 4–0 BC |
| 3rd | BC | Matt Price (5) – EN | unassisted | 55:29 | 5–0 BC |
Penalty summary
| Period | Team | Player | Penalty | Time | PIM |
| 1st | BC | Joe Whitney | Interference | 1:17 | 2:00 |
| 1st | WIS | Ryan McDonagh | Cross–Checking | 5:24 | 2:00 |
| 1st | WIS | John Mitchell | Contact to the Head Elbowing | 11:04 | 2:00 |
| 2nd | WIS | Jake Gardiner | Interference | 23:16 | 2:00 |
| 2nd | BC | Joe Whitney | Clipping | 24:21 | 2:00 |
| 3rd | WIS | Craig Smith | Contact to the Head Elbowing | 46:32 | 2:00 |
| 3rd | WIS | Podge Turnbull | Contact to the Head | 47:20 | 2:00 |
| 3rd | BC | Joe Whitney | Unsportsmanlike Conduct | 50:19 | 2:00 |
| 3rd | BC | Brian Gibbons | Slashing | 57:52 | 2:00 |
| 3rd | WIS | Craig Smith | Slashing | 57:52 | 2:00 |

Shots by period
| Team | 1 | 2 | 3 | T |
|---|---|---|---|---|
| Boston College | 12 | 6 | 8 | 26 |
| Wisconsin | 5 | 9 | 6 | 20 |

Goaltenders
| Team | Name | Saves | Goals against | Time on ice |
|---|---|---|---|---|
| BC | John Muse | 20 | 0 | 60:00 |
| WIS | Scott Gudmandson | 20 | 4 | 58:41 |

== Scoring statistics ==
| Name | Position | Games | Goals | Assists | Points | PIM |
|---|---|---|---|---|---|---|
| Cam Atkinson | RW | 42 | 30 | 23 | 53 | 30 |
| Brian Gibbons | C/W | 42 | 16 | 34 | 50 | 78 |
| Joe Whitney | LW/RW | 42 | 17 | 28 | 45 | 61 |
| Ben Smith | C/RW | 42 | 16 | 21 | 37 | 8 |
| Jimmy Hayes | RW | 42 | 13 | 22 | 35 | 14 |
| Carl Sneep | D | 42 | 11 | 17 | 28 | 26 |
| Pat Mullane | C/RW | 42 | 8 | 20 | 28 | 26 |
| Steven Whitney | C | 42 | 7 | 21 | 28 | 28 |
| Chris Kreider | LW | 38 | 15 | 8 | 23 | 26 |
| Brian Dumoulin | D | 42 | 1 | 21 | 22 | 16 |
| Paul Carey | C/W | 41 | 9 | 12 | 21 | 29 |
| Matt Price | F | 41 | 5 | 11 | 16 | 16 |
| Matt Lombardi | RW | 42 | 7 | 7 | 14 | 14 |
| Philip Samuelsson | D | 42 | 1 | 13 | 14 | 36 |
| Barry Almeida | C/W | 42 | 8 | 5 | 13 | 24 |
| Tommy Cross | D | 38 | 5 | 5 | 10 | 36 |
| Edwin Shea | D | 37 | 1 | 9 | 10 | 14 |
| Patrick Wey | D | 27 | 0 | 5 | 5 | 24 |
| Patch Alber | D | 17 | 1 | 2 | 3 | 8 |
| Malcolm Lyles | D | 8 | 0 | 1 | 1 | 14 |
| Chris Venti | G | 2 | 0 | 0 | 0 | 0 |
| Tommy Atkinson | F | 4 | 0 | 0 | 0 | 2 |
| Parker Milner | G | 14 | 0 | 0 | 0 | 0 |
| John Muse | G | 29 | 0 | 0 | 0 | 4 |
| Bench | - | - | - | - | - | 4 |
| Total | | | 171 | 285 | 456 | 520 |

== Goaltending statistics ==
| Name | Games | Minutes | Wins | Losses | Ties | Goals Against | Saves | Shut Outs | SV % | GAA |
|---|---|---|---|---|---|---|---|---|---|---|
| Chris Venti | 2 | 7:22 | 0 | 0 | 0 | 0 | 3 | 0 | 1.000 | 0.00 |
| Parker Milner | 14 | 801:29 | 10 | 2 | 1 | 31 | 308 | 0 | .909 | 2.32 |
| John Muse | 29 | 1723:58 | 19 | 8 | 2 | 69 | 697 | 2 | .910 | 2.40 |
| Empty Net | - | 10:38 | - | - | - | 4 | - | - | - | - |
| Total | 42 | 2543:27 | 29 | 10 | 3 | 104 | 1008 | 4^ | .906 | 2.45 |

^ Muse and Venti shared a shutout on February 1, Milner and Venti shared a shutout on February 23.

== Rankings ==
| Poll | Week | | | | | | | | | | | | | | | | | | | | | | | | | |
| Poll | Pre | 1 | 2 | 3 | 4 | 5 | 6 | 7 | 8 | 9 | 10 | 11 | 12 | 13 | 14 | 15 | 16 | 17 | 18 | 19 | 20 | 21 | 22 | 23 | 24 | 25 (Final) |
|---|---|---|---|---|---|---|---|---|---|---|---|---|---|---|---|---|---|---|---|---|---|---|---|---|---|---|
| USCHO.com | 12 | 12 | 14 | 13 | 16 | 16 | 17 | 16 | 15 | 10 | 5 | - | 7 | 12 | 11 | 14 | 14 | 10 | 8 | 7 | 5 | 4 | 4 | 3 (8) | - | - |
| USA Today | 12 | 12 | 15 | 12 | NR | NR | NR | 15 | 14 | 10 | 6 | 5 | 8 | 12 | 10 | 15 | 14 | 10 | 9 | 7 | 5 | 4 | 4 | 2 (7) | 3 (1) | 1 (34) |

Note: USCHO did not release a poll in weeks 11, 24, or 25.

== Awards and honors ==
| Player | Award | Ref |
|---|---|---|
| Jerry York | USCHO Coach of the Year | |
| John Muse | Beanpot Tournament MVP | |
| Ben Smith | NCAA Tournament Most Outstanding Player | |
| Ben Smith | Len Ceglarski Award | |
| Matt Lombardi | William Flynn Tournament Most Valuable Player | |
| Brian Gibbons | All-Hockey East First Team | |
| Cam Atkinson | All-Hockey East Second Team | |
| Brian Dumoulin | Hockey East All-Rookie Team | |
| Chris Kreider | Hockey East All-Rookie Team | |
| Matt Lombardi | Hockey East All-Tournament Team | |
| Carl Sneep | Hockey East All-Tournament Team | |
| John Muse | Hockey East All-Tournament Team | |
| Cam Atkinson | NCAA All-Tournament Team | |
| Joe Whitney | NCAA All-Tournament Team | |
| Ben Smith | NCAA All-Tournament Team | |
| Brian Dumoulin | NCAA All-Tournament Team | |
| John Muse | NCAA All-Tournament Team | |

== Players drafted into the NHL ==
=== 2010 NHL entry draft ===
| = NHL All-Star team | = NHL All-Star | = NHL All-Star and NHL All-Star team | = Did not play in the NHL |

| Round | Pick | Player | NHL team |
|---|---|---|---|
| 1 | 24 | Kevin Hayes^{†} | Chicago Blackhawks |
| 4 | 108 | Bill Arnold^{†} | Calgary Flames |
| 5 | 136 | Isaac MacLeod^{†} | San Jose Sharks |

† incoming freshman
