= 2011–12 Boston College Eagles men's ice hockey season =

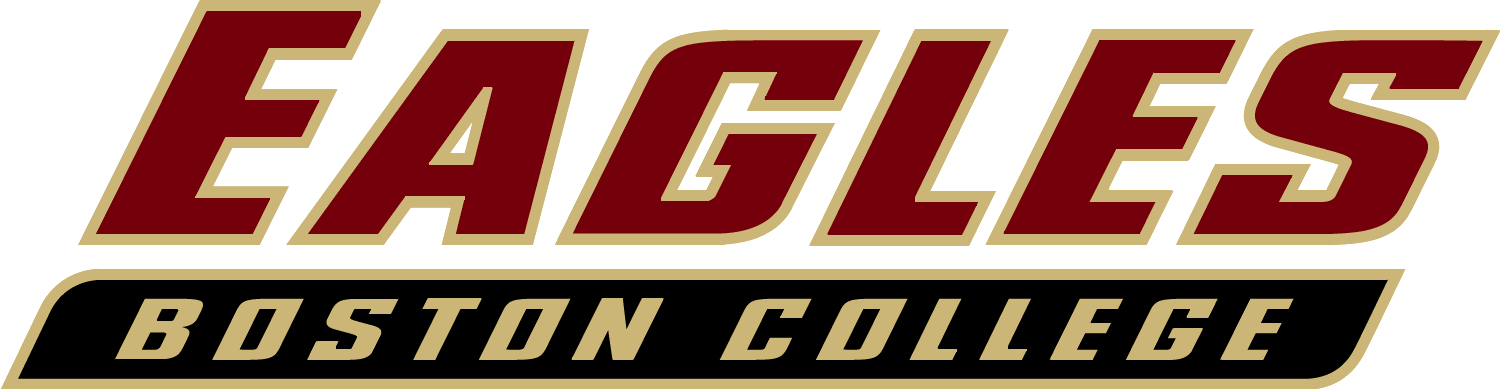

NCAA Division I National Champion Ice Breaker, Champion Beanpot, Champion Hockey East, Champion Hockey East Tournament, Champion NCAA Tournament, Champion
- Conference: 1st Hockey East
- Home ice: Kelley Rink

Rankings
- USA Today: #1
- USCHO.com: #1

Record
- Overall: 33–10–1
- Conference: 19–7–1
- Home: 12–3–1
- Road: 10–6–0
- Neutral: 11–1–0

Coaches and captains
- Head coach: Jerry York
- Assistant coaches: Mike Cavanaugh; Greg Brown; Jim Logue
- Captain: Tommy Cross
- Alternate captain(s): Barry Almeida, Paul Carey

The 2011–12 Boston College Eagles men's ice hockey team represented Boston College in the 2011–12 NCAA Division I men's ice hockey season. The team was coached by Jerry York, '67, his eighteenth season behind the bench at Boston College. The Eagles played their home games at Kelley Rink on the campus of Boston College, competing in Hockey East.

== Offseason ==
March 27, 2011: Junior forward Cam Atkinson signed with the Columbus Blue Jackets, forgoing his senior season.

March 30, 2011: Junior forward Jimmy Hayes signed with the Chicago Blackhawks, also forgoing his senior season.

April 11, 2011: Sophomores Brian Dumoulin and Chris Kreider announced that they would return to Boston College for the 2011–12 season.

April 13, 2011: Sophomore defenseman Philip Samuelsson decided to forgo his final two seasons with Boston College to pursue a pro career in the Pittsburgh Penguins organization.
Also, sophomore forward Chris Kreider was selected to the United States national team that competed at the 2011 IIHF World Championship in Slovakia.

== Season ==
Boston College defeated Ferris State 4–1 in the 2012 Frozen Four championship game, earning the school's fifth national title and third title in five years. It was Jerry York's fourth title as head coach of the Eagles, having also won in 2001, 2008, and 2010. BC entered the NCAA tournament as the number one overall seed, defeating Air Force and defending national champion Minnesota Duluth in the Northeast Regional in Worcester to advance to the Frozen Four at the Tampa Bay Times Forum in Tampa. The Eagles defeated Minnesota 6–1 in the semifinals before beating Ferris State in the national title game, with goaltender Parker Milner earning Most Outstanding Player honors.

Boston College also entered the 2011–2012 season as reigning Hockey East tournament champions, having defeated Merrimack 5–3 in the championship game, as well as defending Beanpot champions, beating Northeastern in the final 7–6 in overtime. The Eagles also won the 2010–11 Hockey East regular season championship, their first since 2004–05.

The Eagles defended their Beanpot title and won their third in a row by defeating Boston University 3–2 on a goal by sophomore forward Bill Arnold in the last seconds of the first overtime period. It was the Eagles seventeenth Beanpot title. The Eagles also defended their Hockey East regular season championship, clinching their record twelfth title in school history on March 3, 2012, by defeating Vermont 4–0 at Kelley Rink. BC won their third Hockey East Tournament championship in a row, the first three-peat in the history of the conference, and record eleventh title all-time, by defeating Maine 4–1 in the championship game in Boston.

Boston College also participated in two additional in-season tournaments, the Ice Breaker in Grand Forks, ND and the Great Lakes Invitational in Detroit, MI. BC won the 2011 Ice Breaker Tournament by defeating Michigan State 5–2 in the first round, and then beating North Dakota in the championship game, 6–2. In the first round of the 2011 Great Lakes Invitational, BC fell to Michigan 4–2 before defeating Michigan Tech 2–1 in the consolation game.

On November 3, 2011, it was announced that the Eagles will play Northeastern at Fenway Park on January 14, 2012, in Hockey East play. The contest was part of a double-header, with a game between MIAA-rivals Boston College High School and Catholic Memorial slated for earlier in the day. BC defeated Northeastern 2–1.

On February 17, 2012, head coach Jerry York won his 900th career game when the Eagles defeated Merrimack 4–2 at Kelley Rink. York is only the second college hockey coach to achieve 900 wins, with Ron Mason being the first. York ended the season with 913, which placed him second all-time in career victories after Ron Mason, who has 924.

== Departures ==
- Brian Gibbons, F – Graduation
- Joe Whitney, F – Graduation
- John Muse, G – Graduation
- Cam Atkinson, F – signed with Columbus Blue Jackets
- Jimmy Hayes, F – signed with Chicago Blackhawks
- Philip Samuelsson, D – signed with Pittsburgh Penguins

== Recruiting ==
Boston College adds nine freshmen for the 2011–2012 season: two goaltenders in Brian Billet and Brad Barone, both alumni of the EJHL; two recruits from Canada in Mark Begert, a defenseman, and Destry Straight, a forward, who were teammates with the Coquitlam Express of the BCHL; forward Danny Linell, a Long Island native and 2011–12 recipient of the Hugh and Doris MacIsaac Family Scholarship Fund; forward Johnny Gaudreau, a fourth round pick of the Calgary Flames in the 2011 NHL entry draft who was previously committed to play at Northeastern; Hingham-native Cam Spiro, who was also an All-American lacrosse player at Tabor Academy; forward Michael Sit, a Minnesota native who joins the Eagles from powerhouse Edina; and forward Quinn Smith, who played for the Youngstown Phantoms in the USHL.

| Player | Position | Nationality | Notes |
|---|---|---|---|
| Brian Billet | Goalie | United States | Brunswick, ME; Three-time EJHL all-star. |
| Brad Barone | Goalie | United States | Medfield, MA; 2010–11 South Shore Kings team MVP. |
| Mark Begert | Defense | Canada | West Vancouver, BC; BCHL academic all-star. |
| Danny Linell | Forward | United States | Great Neck, NY; Team MVP at Choate Rosemary Hall as a senior. |
| Johnny Gaudreau | Forward | United States | Carneys Point, NJ; Selected 104th overall by CGY in 2011 draft. |
| Cam Spiro | Forward | United States | Hingham, MA; Earned All-New England honors as a senior at Tabor. |
| Destry Straight | Forward | Canada | West Vancouver, BC; 2010 Major Midget League all-star. |
| Michael Sit | Forward | United States | Edina, MN; Helped Edina claim the State Class AA title his junior year. |
| Quinn Smith | Forward | United States | Fairfield, CT; Was team MVP as a senior at Avon Old Farms. |

== Roster ==
| No. | Nat. | Player | Class | Pos | Height | Weight | DoB | Hometown | Previous team | NHL rights |
|---|---|---|---|---|---|---|---|---|---|---|
| 1 | | Brian Billet | Freshman | G | 6' 1" (1.85 m) | 190 lb (86 kg) | 1992-03-19 | Brunswick, Maine | New Hampshire (EJHL) | — |
| 2 | | Brian Dumoulin | Junior | D | 6' 4" (1.93 m) | 210 lb (95 kg) | 1991-09-06 | Biddeford, Maine | New Hampshire (EJHL) | CAR, 51st overall 2009 |
| 3 | | Patch Alber | Junior | D | 5' 10" (1.78 m) | 170 lb (77 kg) | 1989-03-11 | Clifton Park, New York | Boston (EJHL) | — |
| 4 | | Tommy Cross (C) | Senior | D | 6' 3" (1.91 m) | 215 lb (98 kg) | 1989-09-12 | Simsbury, Connecticut | Westminster (USHS–CT) | BOS, 35th overall 2007 |
| 5 | | Mark Begert | Freshman | D | 5' 11" (1.8 m) | 190 lb (86 kg) | 1993-06-06 | West Vancouver, British Columbia | Coquitlam (BCHL) | — |
| 6 | | Patrick Wey | Junior | D | 6' 3" (1.91 m) | 210 lb (95 kg) | 1991-03-21 | Pittsburgh, Pennsylvania | Waterloo (USHL) | WSH, 115th overall 2009 |
| 7 | | Isaac MacLeod | Sophomore | D | 6' 5" (1.96 m) | 210 lb (95 kg) | 1992-02-22 | Nelson, British Columbia | Penticton (BCHL) | SJS, 136th overall 2010 |
| 8 | | Edwin Shea | Senior | D | 6' 0" (1.83 m) | 190 lb (86 kg) | 1989-09-16 | Shrewsbury, Massachusetts | Boston (EJHL) | — |
| 9 | | Barry Almeida (A) | Senior | F | 5' 8" (1.73 m) | 183 lb (83 kg) | 1988-11-20 | Springfield, Massachusetts | Omaha (USHL) | — |
| 10 | | Danny Linell | Freshman | F | 5' 9" (1.75 m) | 185 lb (84 kg) | 1992-09-04 | Great Neck, New York | Choate (USHS–CT) | — |
| 11 | | Pat Mullane | Junior | F | 5' 11" (1.8 m) | 190 lb (86 kg) | 1990-07-31 | Wallingford, Connecticut | Omaha (USHL) | — |
| 12 | | Kevin Hayes | Sophomore | F | 6' 3" (1.91 m) | 205 lb (93 kg) | 1992-05-08 | Dorchester, Massachusetts | Nobles (USHS–MA) | CHI, 24th overall 2010 |
| 13 | | Johnny Gaudreau | Freshman | F | 5' 7" (1.7 m) | 150 lb (68 kg) | 1993-08-13 | Carneys Point, New Jersey | Dubuque (USHL) | CGY, 104th overall 2011 |
| 14 | | Brooks Dyroff | Junior | F | 6' 0" (1.83 m) | 190 lb (86 kg) | 1990-01-22 | Boulder, Colorado | Phillips Andover (USHS–MA) | — |
| 15 | | Cam Spiro | Freshman | F | 5' 11" (1.8 m) | 195 lb (88 kg) | 1991-12-30 | Hingham, Massachusetts | Tabor (USHS–MA) | — |
| 17 | | Destry Straight | Freshman | F | 6' 0" (1.83 m) | 165 lb (75 kg) | 1993-03-22 | West Vancouver, British Columbia | Coquitlam (BCHL) | — |
| 18 | | Michael Sit | Freshman | F | 5' 10" (1.78 m) | 180 lb (82 kg) | 1993-02-04 | Edina, Minnesota | Edina (USHS–MN) | — |
| 19 | | Chris Kreider | Junior | F | 6' 3" (1.91 m) | 225 lb (102 kg) | 1991-04-30 | Boxford, Massachusetts | Phillips Andover (USHS–MA) | NYR, 19th overall 2009 |
| 21 | | Steven Whitney | Junior | F | 5' 7" (1.7 m) | 162 lb (73 kg) | 1991-02-18 | Reading, Massachusetts | Lawrence (USHS–MA) | — |
| 22 | | Paul Carey (A) | Senior | F | 6' 1" (1.85 m) | 196 lb (89 kg) | 1988-09-24 | Weymouth, Massachusetts | Indiana (USHL) | COL, 135th overall 2007 |
| 23 | | Patrick Brown | Sophomore | F | 6' 1" (1.85 m) | 197 lb (89 kg) | 1992-05-29 | Bloomfield Hills, Michigan | Cranbrook-Kingswood (USHS–MI) | — |
| 24 | | Bill Arnold | Sophomore | F | 6' 0" (1.83 m) | 210 lb (95 kg) | 1992-05-13 | Needham, Massachusetts | US NTDP (USHL) | CGY, 108th overall 2010 |
| 27 | | Quinn Smith | Freshman | F | 5' 8" (1.73 m) | 165 lb (75 kg) | 1992-01-11 | Fairfield, Connecticut | Avon Old Farms (USHS–CT) | — |
| 29 | | Brad Barone | Freshman | G | 5' 11" (1.8 m) | 180 lb (82 kg) | 1990-12-02 | Medfield, Massachusetts | South Shore (EJHL) | — |
| 30 | | Chris Venti | Senior | G | 6' 0" (1.83 m) | 165 lb (75 kg) | 1988-08-29 | Needham, Massachusetts | Buckingham Browne & Nichols (USHS–MA) | — |
| 35 | | Parker Milner | Junior | G | 6' 1" (1.85 m) | 197 lb (89 kg) | 1990-09-06 | Pittsburgh, Pennsylvania | Waterloo (USHL) | — |

== Standings ==
- On September 27, 2011, BC was picked to finish first in the preseason Hockey East coaches poll.

2011–12 Hockey East standings
| | Conference | | | | | | | Overall | | | | | |
| | GP | W | L | T | PTS | GF | GA | GP | W | L | T | GF | GA |
|---|---|---|---|---|---|---|---|---|---|---|---|---|---|
| #1 Boston College†* | 27 | 19 | 7 | 1 | 39 | 96 | 60 | 44 | 33 | 10 | 1 | 157 | 89 |
| #11 Boston University | 27 | 17 | 9 | 1 | 35 | 101 | 70 | 39 | 23 | 15 | 1 | 139 | 112 |
| #9 Massachusetts–Lowell | 27 | 17 | 9 | 1 | 35 | 90 | 68 | 38 | 24 | 13 | 1 | 126 | 94 |
| #13 Maine | 27 | 15 | 10 | 2 | 32 | 91 | 80 | 40 | 23 | 14 | 3 | 133 | 114 |
| #17 Merrimack | 27 | 13 | 9 | 5 | 31 | 70 | 65 | 37 | 18 | 12 | 7 | 102 | 83 |
| New Hampshire | 27 | 11 | 14 | 2 | 24 | 68 | 74 | 37 | 15 | 19 | 3 | 108 | 110 |
| Providence | 27 | 10 | 14 | 3 | 23 | 68 | 89 | 38 | 14 | 20 | 4 | 94 | 122 |
| Massachusetts | 27 | 9 | 14 | 4 | 22 | 83 | 92 | 36 | 13 | 18 | 5 | 114 | 118 |
| Northeastern | 27 | 9 | 14 | 4 | 22 | 73 | 82 | 34 | 13 | 16 | 5 | 97 | 101 |
| Vermont | 27 | 3 | 23 | 1 | 7 | 54 | 114 | 34 | 6 | 27 | 1 | 73 | 140 |
Championship: Boston College 4, Maine 1 † indicates conference regular season champion; * indicates conference tournament champion Rankings: USCHO.com Top 20 Poll

== Schedule and results ==
| Date | Time | Opponent^{#} | Rank^{#} | Site | TV | Decision | Result | Attendance | Record |
Ice Breaker
| October 7 | 5:07 pm | vs. Michigan State* | #5 | Ralph Engelstad Arena • Grand Forks, North Dakota (Ice Breaker Semifinal) | | Milner | W 5–2 | 8,699 | 1–0–0 |
| October 8 | 8:37 pm | at #3 North Dakota* | #5 | Ralph Engelstad Arena • Grand Forks, North Dakota (Ice Breaker Championship) | | Milner | W 6–2 | 9,420 | 2–0–0 |
Regular Season
| October 14 | 7:42 pm | #3 Denver* | #1 | Conte Forum • Chestnut Hill, Massachusetts | | Milner | L 2–4 | 7,884 | 2–1–0 |
| October 15 | 7:00 pm | at #15 New Hampshire | #1 | Whittemore Center • Durham, New Hampshire | | Milner | W 5–1 | 6,501 | 3–1–0 (1–0–0) |
| October 21 | 7:05 pm | Merrimack | #2 | Conte Forum • Chestnut Hill, Massachusetts | | Milner | W 4–2 | 5,911 | 4–1–0 (2–0–0) |
| October 22 | 7:00 pm | at Northeastern | #2 | Matthews Arena • Boston, Massachusetts | | Milner | W 4–3 ^{OT} | 4,746 | 5–1–0 (3–0–0) |
| October 28 | 7:15 pm | at Massachusetts–Lowell | #1 | Tsongas Center • Lowell, Massachusetts | | Milner | W 4–2 | 5,162 | 6–1–0 (4–0–0) |
| October 29 | 7:05 pm | Massachusetts–Lowell | #1 | Conte Forum • Chestnut Hill, Massachusetts | | Milner | W 6–3 | 4,207 | 7–1–0 (5–0–0) |
| November 4 | 7:05 pm | Maine | #1 | Conte Forum • Chestnut Hill, Massachusetts | | Milner | W 5–1 | 6,304 | 8–1–0 (6–0–0) |
| November 5 | 7:00 pm | at Massachusetts | #1 | Mullins Center • Amherst, Massachusetts | | Milner | L 2–4 | 7,622 | 8–2–0 (6–1–0) |
| November 11 | 7:00 pm | at Northeastern | #2 | Conte Forum • Chestnut Hill, Massachusetts | | Milner | W 2–1 | 6,688 | 9–2–0 (7–1–0) |
| November 13 | 4:12 pm | at #16 Boston University | #2 | Conte Forum • Chestnut Hill, Massachusetts (Rivalry) | | Milner | L 0–5 | 7,884 | 9–3–0 (7–2–0) |
| November 18 | 7:42 pm | at #4 Notre Dame* | #3 | Compton Family Ice Arena • Notre Dame, Indiana (Rivalry) | | Milner | L 2–3 ^{OT} | 5,022 | 9–4–0 |
| November 26 | 4:00 pm | at #8 Yale* | #5 | Ingalls Rink • New Haven, Connecticut | | Billett | W 3–2 | 3,500 | 10–4–0 |
| December 2 | 7:42 pm | #13 Boston University | #2 | Conte Forum • Chestnut Hill, Massachusetts (Rivalry) | | Milner | L 3–5 | 7,884 | 10–5–0 (7–3–0) |
| December 3 | 7:05 pm | at #13 Boston University | #2 | Agganis Arena • Boston, Massachusetts (Rivalry) | | Billett | W 6–1 | 6,150 | 11–5–0 (8–3–0) |
| December 6 | 7:05 pm | Providence | #3 | Conte Forum • Chestnut Hill, Massachusetts | | Billett | W 4–1 | 3,823 | 12–5–0 (9–3–0) |
| December 9 | 7:06 pm | at #18 Massachusetts–Lowell | #3 | Tsongas Center • Lowell, Massachusetts | | Billett | L 2–3 | 5,988 | 12–6–0 (9–4–0) |
Great Lakes Invitational
| December 29 | 6:37 pm | vs. #20 Michigan* | #3 | Joe Louis Arena • Detroit, Michigan (Great Lakes Invitational Semifinal) | | Billett | L 2–4 | 15,091 | 12–7–0 |
| December 30 | 4:00 pm | vs. Michigan Tech* | #3 | Joe Louis Arena • Detroit, Michigan (Great Lakes Invitational Third Place Game) | | Milner | W 2–1 | 17,242 | 13–7–0 |
| January 8 | 1:05 pm | #7 Merrimack | #4 | Conte Forum • Chestnut Hill, Massachusetts | | Billett | T 2–2 ^{OT} | 7,114 | 13–7–1 (9–4–1) |
| January 13 | 7:00 pm | at Massachusetts | #4 | Mullins Center • Amherst, Massachusetts | | Billett | L 0–4 | 5,823 | 13–8–1 (9–5–1) |
| January 14 | 4:05 pm | vs. Northeastern | #4 | Fenway Park • Boston, Massachusetts | | Venti | W 2–1 | 29,601 | 14–8–1 (10–5–1) |
| January 20 | 7:07 pm | at Maine | #3 | Alfond Arena • Orono, Maine | | Venti | L 3–4 ^{OT} | 4,950 | 14–9–1 (10–6–1) |
| January 21 | 4:07 pm | at Maine | #3 | Alfond Arena • Orono, Maine | | Billett | L 4–7 | 5,098 | 14–10–1 (10–7–1) |
| January 27 | 7:05 pm | New Hampshire | #7 | Conte Forum • Chestnut Hill, Massachusetts | | Milner | W 4–3 | 7,228 | 15–10–1 (11–7–1) |
| January 28 | 7:05 pm | at New Hampshire | #7 | Whittemore Center • Durham, New Hampshire | | Milner | W 3–2 ^{OT} | 6,501 | 16–10–1 (12–7–1) |
Beanpot
| February 6 | 8:21 pm | vs. Northeastern* | #5 | TD Banknorth Garden • Boston, Massachusetts (Beanpot Semifinal) | | Milner | W 7–1 | 16,005 | 17–10–1 |
| February 10 | 7:35 pm | at Vermont | #5 | Gutterson Fieldhouse • Burlington, Vermont | | Milner | W 6–1 | 4,007 | 18–10–1 (13–7–1) |
| February 13 | 7:40 pm | vs. #2 Boston University* | #3 | TD Banknorth Garden • Boston, Massachusetts (Beanpot Championship; Rivalry) | | Milner | W 3–2 ^{OT} | 17,565 | 19–10–1 |
| February 17 | 7:05 pm | #12 Merrimack | #3 | Conte Forum • Chestnut Hill, Massachusetts | | Milner | W 4–2 | 7,390 | 20–10–1 (14–7–1) |
| February 18 | 7:05 pm | at #12 Merrimack | #3 | J. Thom Lawler Rink • North Andover, Massachusetts | | Milner | W 2–1 | 2,489 | 21–10–1 (15–7–1) |
| February 24 | 7:05 pm | at Providence | #2 | Schneider Arena • Providence, Rhode Island | | Milner | W 3–0 | 3,030 | 22–10–1 (16–7–1) |
| February 25 | 3:30 pm | Providence | #2 | Conte Forum • Chestnut Hill, Massachusetts | | Milner | W 7–0 | 7,419 | 23–10–1 (17–7–1) |
| March 2 | 7:35 pm | Vermont | #1 | Conte Forum • Chestnut Hill, Massachusetts | | Milner | W 5–1 | 5,527 | 24–10–1 (18–7–1) |
| March 3 | 7:05 pm | Vermont | #1 | Conte Forum • Chestnut Hill, Massachusetts | | Milner | W 4–0 | 6,340 | 25–10–1 (19–7–1) |
Hockey East Tournament
| March 9 | 7:40 pm | Massachusetts* | #1 | Conte Forum • Chestnut Hill, Massachusetts (Hockey East Quarterfinals Game 1) | | Milner | W 2–1 | 3,188 | 26–10–1 |
| March 10 | 7:05 pm | Massachusetts* | #1 | Conte Forum • Chestnut Hill, Massachusetts (Hockey East Quarterfinals Game 2) | | Milner | W 2–1 | 3,946 | 27–10–1 |
| March 16 | 5:15 pm | vs. Providence* | #1 | TD Banknorth Garden • Boston, Massachusetts (Hockey East Semifinal) | | Milner | W 4–2 | 13,974 | 28–10–1 |
| March 17 | 8:08 pm | vs. #11 Maine* | #1 | TD Banknorth Garden • Boston, Massachusetts (Hockey East Championship) | | Milner | W 4–1 | 13,079 | 29–10–1 |
NCAA Tournament
| March 24 | 4:05 pm | vs. #16 Air Force* | #1 | DCU Center • Worcester, Massachusetts (Northeast Regional Semifinal) | | Milner | W 2–0 | 5,925 | 30–10–1 |
| March 25 | 8:03 pm | vs. #5 Minnesota–Duluth* | #1 | DCU Center • Worcester, Massachusetts (Northeast Regional Final) | | Milner | W 4–0 | 4,470 | 31–10–1 |
| April 5 | 8:19 pm | vs. #6 Minnesota* | #1 | Tampa Bay Times Forum • Tampa, Florida (National Semifinal) | | Milner | W 6–1 | 18,605 | 32–10–1 |
| April 7 | 7:00 pm | vs. #9 Ferris State* | #1 | Tampa Bay Times Forum • Tampa, Florida (National Championship) | | Milner | W 4–1 | 18,818 | 33–10–1 |
*Non-conference game. ^{#}Rankings from USCHO.com Poll. All times are in Eastern Time. Source:

== Statistics ==
=== Skaters ===
| No. | Player | POS | YR | GP | G | A | Pts | PIM | PP | SHG | GWG | +/- | SOG |
|---|---|---|---|---|---|---|---|---|---|---|---|---|---|
| 1 | Brian Billett | G | FR | 8 | 0 | 1 | 1 | 0 | 0 | 0 | 0 | +4 | 0 |
| 2 | Brian Dumoulin | D | JR | 44 | 7 | 21 | 28 | 26 | 2 | 0 | 2 | +27 | 79 |
| 3 | Patch Alber | D | JR | 44 | 1 | 13 | 14 | 40 | 0 | 0 | 0 | +16 | 36 |
| 4 | Tommy Cross | D | SR | 44 | 5 | 19 | 24 | 66 | 2 | 0 | 4 | +15 | 104 |
| 5 | Mark Begert | D | FR | 1 | 0 | 0 | 0 | 0 | 0 | 0 | 0 | E | 0 |
| 6 | Patrick Wey | D | JR | 32 | 2 | 5 | 7 | 24 | 0 | 0 | 0 | +17 | 38 |
| 7 | Isaac Macleod | D | SO | 44 | 0 | 6 | 6 | 22 | 0 | 0 | 0 | +13 | 23 |
| 8 | Edwin Shea | D | SR | 44 | 0 | 7 | 7 | 12 | 0 | 0 | 0 | +14 | 41 |
| 9 | Barry Almeida | F | SR | 44 | 22 | 18 | 40 | 22 | 11 | 2 | 2 | +15 | 114 |
| 10 | Danny Linell | F | FR | 40 | 3 | 3 | 6 | 2 | 0 | 0 | 1 | E | 43 |
| 11 | Pat Mullane | F | JR | 44 | 10 | 29 | 39 | 39 | 0 | 1 | 1 | +12 | 93 |
| 12 | Kevin Hayes | F | SO | 44 | 7 | 21 | 28 | 10 | 3 | 0 | 3 | +9 | 75 |
| 13 | Johnny Gaudreau | F | FR | 44 | 21 | 23 | 44 | 10 | 7 | 0 | 5 | +20 | 124 |
| 14 | Brooks Dyroff | F | JR | 11 | 0 | 1 | 1 | 6 | 0 | 0 | 0 | −1 | 1 |
| 15 | Cam Spiro | F | FR | 1 | 0 | 0 | 0 | 2 | 0 | 0 | 0 | E | 2 |
| 17 | Destry Straight | F | FR | 43 | 3 | 7 | 10 | 22 | 0 | 0 | 1 | +9 | 34 |
| 18 | Michael Sit | F | FR | 39 | 0 | 3 | 3 | 10 | 0 | 0 | 0 | −3 | 19 |
| 19 | Chris Kreider | F | JR | 44 | 23 | 22 | 45 | 66 | 7 | 3 | 5 | +9 | 139 |
| 21 | Steven Whitney | F | JR | 44 | 16 | 23 | 39 | 65 | 2 | 3 | 2 | +15 | 110 |
| 22 | Paul Carey | F | SR | 44 | 18 | 12 | 30 | 30 | 5 | 1 | 3 | +15 | 152 |
| 23 | Patrick Brown | F | SO | 13 | 1 | 0 | 1 | 6 | 0 | 0 | 0 | −3 | 11 |
| 24 | Bill Arnold | F | SO | 42 | 17 | 19 | 36 | 46 | 3 | 1 | 4 | +16 | 81 |
| 27 | Quinn Smith | F | FR | 32 | 1 | 3 | 4 | 8 | 0 | 0 | 0 | +1 | 21 |
| 28 | Tommy Atkinson | F | SR | 10 | 0 | 0 | 0 | 6 | 0 | 0 | 0 | E | 6 |
| 29 | Brad Barone | G | FR | 0 | 0 | 0 | 0 | 0 | 0 | 0 | 0 | – | 0 |
| 30 | Chris Venti | G | SR | 5 | 0 | 0 | 0 | 0 | 0 | 0 | 0 | −2 | 0 |
| 35 | Parker Milner | G | JR | 34 | 0 | 1 | 1 | 4 | 0 | 0 | 0 | +50 | 0 |
| | Bench | | | | | | | 10 | | | | | |
| | Team | | | 44 | 157 | 257 | 414 | 554 | 42 | 11 | 33 | +48 | 1346 |

=== Goaltenders ===
| No. | Player | YR | GP | MIN | W | L | T | GA | GAA | SA | SV | SV% | SO |
|---|---|---|---|---|---|---|---|---|---|---|---|---|---|
| 1 | Brian Billett | FR | 8 | 450:39 | 3 | 4 | 1 | 20 | 2.66 | 216 | 196 | .907 | 0 |
| 29 | Brad Barone | FR | 0 | 0:00 | 0 | 0 | 0 | 0 | 0.00 | 0 | 0 | .000 | 0 |
| 30 | Chris Venti | SR | 5 | 165:20 | 1 | 1 | 0 | 6 | 2.18 | 58 | 52 | .897 | 0 |
| 35 | Parker Milner | JR | 34 | 2055:47 | 29 | 5 | 0 | 57 | 1.66 | 909 | 852 | .937 | 3 |

== Rankings ==
| Poll | Week | | | | | | | | | | | | | | | | | | | | | | | | | |
| Poll | Pre | 1 | 2 | 3 | 4 | 5 | 6 | 7 | 8 | 9 | 10 | 11 | 12 | 13 | 14 | 15 | 16 | 17 | 18 | 19 | 20 | 21 | 22 | 23 | 24 | 25 (Final) |
|---|---|---|---|---|---|---|---|---|---|---|---|---|---|---|---|---|---|---|---|---|---|---|---|---|---|---|
| USCHO.com | 5 | 1 (36) | 2 (16) | 1 (32) | 1 (42) | 2 (15) | 3 (4) | 4 (1) | 2 (2) | 3 (8) | 3 | 3 | 4 | 4 | 3 | 7 | 5 | 5 | 3 (13) | 2 (11) | 1 (44) | 1 (50) | 1 (50) | 1 (50) | - | 1 (50) |
| USA Today | 5 | 1 (27) | 1 (15) | 1 (22) | 1 (30) | 2 (6) | 3 | 5 | 3 | 3 (3) | 4 | 3 | 4 | 4 | 4 | 8 | 5 | 4 | 4 (6) | 2 (6) | 1 (31) | 1 (34) | 1 (34) | 1 (34) | 1 (34) | 1 (34) |

Note: USCHO did not release a poll in week 24.

== Awards and honors ==
=== Conference, National, and Tournament Awards ===
2011 Ice Breaker MVP

- Chris Kreider, F

2011 Ice Breaker All-Tournament Team

- Parker Milner, G
- Tommy Cross, D
- Patch Alber, D
- Chris Kreider, F
- Bill Arnold, F

2012 NCAA Tournament Most Outstanding Player

- Parker Milner, G

2012 NCAA Frozen Four All-Tournament Team

- Parker Milner, G
- Brian Dumoulin, D
- Steven Whitney, F
- Paul Carey, F

2011–12 AHCA All-Americans

- Brian Dumoulin, D (First Team)
- Barry Almeida, F (Second Team)

2012 All-USCHO

- Brian Dumoulin, D (First Team)
- Barry Almeida, F (Second Team)
- Parker Milner, G (Third Team)
- Tommy Cross, D (Third Team)

2012 USCHO Rookie of the Year

- Johnny Gaudreau, F

2011–12 INCH All-Americans

- Brian Dumoulin, D

2011–12 INCH Freshman All-Americans

- Johnny Gaudreau, F

2011–12 New England Men's Division I All-Stars

- Brian Dumoulin, D
- Chris Kreider, F

2011–12 Bob Monahan Award – Best Defenseman in New England

- Brian Dumoulin, D

2012 Beanpot MVP

- Johnny Gaudreau, F

2012 Hockey East Tournament MVP

- Johnny Gaudreau, F

2012 Hockey East All-Tournament Team

- Parker Milner, G
- Brian Dumoulin, D
- Johnny Gaudreau, F

National Player of the Month

- Parker Milner, G March/April 2012

National Rookie of the Month

- Johnny Gaudreau, F March/April 2012

Hockey East Player of the Month

- Bill Arnold, F – October 2011
- Parker Milner, G – March 2011

Hockey East Goaltender of the Month

- Parker Milner – February 2012

Hockey East Rookie of the Month

- Johnny Gaudreau, F – October 2011, March 2011, February 2012

Hockey East Team of the Week

- Week of October 10, 2011
- Week of October 24, 2011
- Week of February 20, 2012
- Week of March 5, 2012
- Week of March 26, 2012
- Week of April 9, 2012

Hockey East Player of the Week

- Bill Arnold, F – Week of October 24, 2011 (shared with Sebastian Stalberg, F, Vermont)
- Chris Kreider, F – Week of January 30, 2012 (shared with Cody Ferriero, F, Northeastern)
- Parker Milner, G – Week of March 26, 2012, Week of April 9, 2012

Hockey East Defensive Player of the Week

- Brian Billett, G – Week of November 28, 2011
- Parker Milner, G – Week of February 20, 2012, Week of February 27, 2012, Week of March 5, 2012 (shared with Dan Sullivan, G, Maine)
- Patrick Wey, D – Week of March 26, 2012
- Brian Dumoulin, D – Week of April 9, 2012

Hockey East Rookie of the Week

- Johnny Gaudreau, F – Week of October 10, 2011, Week of October 31, 2011, Week of February 13,2012, Week of March 26, 2012, Week of April 9, 2012

2011–12 Hockey East Best Defensive Defenseman

- Brian Dumoulin, D

2011–12 Hockey East Goaltending champion

- Park Milner, 1.85 GAA, .928 Save %

2011–12 Hockey East First Team All-Stars

- Brian Dumoulin, D
- Barry Almeida, F

2011–12 Hockey East Second Team All-Stars

- Chris Kreider, F

2011–12 Hockey East Honorable Mention All-Stars

- Tommy Cross, D

2011–12 Hockey East All-Rookie Team

- Johnny Gaudreau, F

2011–12 Hockey East All-Academic Team

- Patrick Brown, F
- Brooks Dyroff, F
- Isaac Macleod, D
- Pat Mullane, F
- Michael Sit, F
- Patrick Wey, D

=== Team Awards ===
Boston College Eagle of the Year

- Tommy Cross (male recipient)

Norman F. Dailey Award (Team MVP)

- Barry Almeida, F
- Brian Dumoulin, D
- Parker Milner, G

John "Snooks" Kelley Memorial Award (Best Typifies BC Hockey)

- Tommy Cross, D
- Paul Carey, F

William J. Flynn Coaches Award

- Chris Venti, G
- Samson Lee, manager

James E. Tiernan Award (Most Improved Player)

- Chris Kreider, F

Bernie Burke Outstanding Freshman Award

- Johnny Gaudreau, F

Academic Excellence Award

- Tommy Cross, D

Academic Achievement Award

- Edwin Shea, D

== Players drafted into the NHL ==
=== 2012 NHL entry draft ===
| = NHL All-Star team | = NHL All-Star | = NHL All-Star and NHL All-Star team | = Did not play in the NHL |

| Round | Pick | Player | NHL team |
|---|---|---|---|
| 1 | 23 | Mike Matheson^{†} | Florida Panthers |
| 3 | 79 | Chris Calnan^{†} | Chicago Blackhawks |
| 4 | 98 | Adam Gilmour^{†} | Minnesota Wild |

† incoming freshman
