= 2012 NCAA Division I men's ice hockey tournament =

- 2012 Frozen Four logo
- Teams: 16
- Finals site: Tampa Bay Times Forum, Tampa, Florida
- Champions: Boston College Eagles (5th title)
- Runner-up: Ferris State Bulldogs (1st title game)
- Semifinalists: Union Dutchmen (1st Frozen Four); Minnesota Golden Gophers (20th Frozen Four)
- Winning coach: Jerry York (5th title)
- MOP: Parker Milner (Boston College)
- Attendance: 18,818 (Championship); 56,028 (Frozen Four); 127,640 (Tournament)

The 2012 NCAA Division I men's ice hockey tournament involved sixteen schools in single-elimination play to determine the national champion of men's National Collegiate Athletic Association (NCAA) Division I college ice hockey for the 2011–12 season. The tournament began on March 23, 2012, with regional semifinals and ended on April 7 with the national championship game. The Boston College Eagles won their third national championship in five years, beating the Ferris State Bulldogs, 4–1, in the championship game. BC won nineteen consecutive games to end the season. It is the fifth title for both the program and the last under head coach Jerry York – York previously coached Bowling Green to a championship in 1984. and retired in 2022.

This year's tournament marked the last of 22 consecutive years of playoff berths, a tournament record, for Michigan, following their defeat in the Midwest Regional Semifinals versus Cornell. They would not appear in the tournament again until 2016.

This year's Frozen Four featured multiple teams, Ferris State and Union, making their first appearance. This last occurred in 2009, when Bemidji State and Miami both made their first Frozen Four appearances.

== Tournament procedure ==
2012 Regionals (blue) and Frozen Four (red)

The four regionals are officially named after their geographic areas. The following are the sites for the 2012 regionals:

March 23 and 24
East Regional, Webster Bank Arena – Bridgeport, Connecticut (Hosts: Yale University and Fairfield University)
Midwest Regional, Resch Center – Green Bay, Wisconsin (Host: Michigan Technological University)
March 24 and 25
Northeast Regional, DCU Center – Worcester, Massachusetts (Host: College of the Holy Cross)
West Regional, Xcel Energy Center – Saint Paul, Minnesota (Host: University of Minnesota)

Each regional winner will advance to the Frozen Four:

April 5 and 7
Tampa Bay Times Forum – Tampa, Florida (Hosts: University of Alabama in Huntsville and the Tampa Bay Sports Commission)

== Qualifying teams ==
The at-large bids and seeding for each team in the tournament were announced on March 18. The Central Collegiate Hockey Association (CCHA) had five teams receive a berth in the tournament, the Western Collegiate Hockey Association (WCHA) and Hockey East had four teams receive a berth, ECAC Hockey had two teams receive a berth, and Atlantic Hockey had one team receive a berth.

Northeast Regional – Worcester						Midwest Regional – Green Bay					
Seed	School	Conference	Record	Berth type	Last Bid	Seed	School	Conference	Record	Berth type	Last Bid
1	Boston College (1)	Hockey East	29–10–1	Tournament champion	2011	1	Michigan (2)	CCHA	24–12–4	At-large bid	2011
2	Minnesota–Duluth	WCHA	24–9–6	At-large bid	2011	2	Ferris State	CCHA	23–11–5	At-large bid	2003
3	Maine	Hockey East	23–13–3	At-large bid	2007	3	Denver	WCHA	25–13–4	At-large bid	2011
4	Air Force	Atlantic Hockey	21–10–7	Tournament champion	2011	4	Cornell	ECAC Hockey	18–8–7	At-large bid	2010
East Regional – Bridgeport						West Regional – Saint Paul					
Seed	School	Conference	Record	Berth type	Last Bid	Seed	School	Conference	Record	Berth type	Last Bid
1	Union (3)	ECAC Hockey	24–7–7	Tournament champion	2011	1	North Dakota (4)	WCHA	25–12–3	Tournament champion	2011
2	Miami	CCHA	24–14–2	At-large bid	2011	2	Minnesota	WCHA	26–13–1	At-large bid	2008
3	Massachusetts–Lowell	Hockey East	23–12–1	At-large bid	1996	3	Boston University	Hockey East	23–14–1	At-large bid	2012
4	Michigan State	CCHA	19–15–4	At-large bid	2008	4	Western Michigan	CCHA	21–13–6	Tournament champion	2011

Number in parentheses denotes overall seed in the tournament.

== Bracket ==
Regional Semifinals; March 23–24
1	Boston College (1)	2
4	Air Force	0
Northeast – Worcester – Sat/Sun
2	Minnesota–Duluth	5
3	Maine	2
1	North Dakota (4)	3
4	Western Michigan	1
West – St. Paul – Sat/Sun
2	Minnesota	7
3	Boston University	3
1	Michigan (2)	2
4	Cornell	3*
Midwest – Green Bay – Fri/Sat
2	Ferris State	2
3	Denver	1
1	Union (3)	3
4	Michigan State	1
East – Bridgeport – Fri/Sat
2	Miami	3
3	Massachusetts–Lowell	4*

Regional Finals; March 24–25
1	Boston College (1)	4
2	Minnesota–Duluth	0
1	North Dakota (4)	2
2	Minnesota	5
4	Cornell	1
2	Ferris State	2
1	Union (3)	4
3	Massachusetts–Lowell	2

National Semifinals; April 5
NE1	Boston College (1)	6
W2	Minnesota	1
MW2	Ferris State	3
E1	Union (3)	1

National Championship; April 7
NE1	Boston College (1)	4
MW2	Ferris State	1

Number in parentheses denotes overall seed in the tournament
(*) denotes overtime period(s)

== Results ==
=== Northeast Regional – Worcester, Massachusetts ===
==== Regional Semifinals ====
March 24, 2012; 4:00 pm EDT	(1) Boston College	2–0 (1–0, 0–0, 1–0)	(4) Air Force	DCU Center; Attendance: 5,925

Game reference
Parker Milner	Goalies	Jason Torf	Referees: Mark Wilkins; Barry Pochmara; Linesmen: Joe Hutek; Bruce Vida
(Hayes, Straight) Chris Kreider (21) – GW – 07:39 / 1 – 0; (Wey) Chris Kreider (22) – PP – 58:39 / 2 – 0			Referees: Mark Wilkins; Barry Pochmara; Linesmen: Joe Hutek; Bruce Vida
4 min	Penalties	10 min	Referees: Mark Wilkins; Barry Pochmara; Linesmen: Joe Hutek; Bruce Vida
34	Shots	20	Referees: Mark Wilkins; Barry Pochmara; Linesmen: Joe Hutek; Bruce Vida

March 24, 2012; 7:30 pm EDT	(2) Minnesota–Duluth	5–2 (0–1, 3–1, 2–0)	(3) Maine	DCU Center; Attendance: 5,925

Game reference

Kenny Reiter
Goalies
Dan Sullivan
Referees:
Steve McInchak
Brian Aaron
Linesmen:
T.J. Likens
Tony Molina

	0 – 1	17:16 – PP –Spencer Abbott (21) (Flynn, O'Neill)
	0 – 2	27:10 – Matt Mangene (16) (Cornell, O'Neill)
(Oleksuk, McManus) Jack Connolly (20) – PP – 30:47	1 – 2
(unassisted) Caleb Herbert (14) – 36:28	2 – 2
(Lamb) Jake Hendrickson (4) – GW – 37:28	3 – 2
(Oleksuk) J.T. Brown (24) – 49:15	4 – 2
(Connolly, Casto) Jake Hendrickson (5) – EN – 59:19	5 – 2

10 min
Penalties
6 min
26
Shots
27

==== Regional Final ====
March 25, 2012; 8:00 pm EDT	(1) Boston College	4–0 (0–0, 2–0, 2–0)	(2) Minnesota-Duluth	DCU Center; Attendance: 4,470

Game reference

Kenny Reiter
Goalies
Parker Milner
Referees:
Barry Pochmara
Steve McInchak
Linesmen:
Joe Hutek
T.J. Likens

(Carey, Gaudreau) Pat Mullane (10) – GW – 24:01	1 – 0
(Whitney) Bill Arnold (17) – 25:27	2 – 0
(unassisted) Patrick Wey (2) – 41:13	3 – 0
(Wey) Johnny Gaudreau (20) – PP – 51:47	4 – 0

12 min
Penalties
8 min
24
Shots
33

=== Midwest Regional – Green Bay, Wisconsin ===
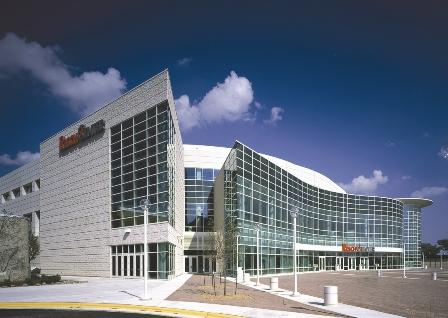
Midwest Regional games were played at the Resch Center in Green Bay, Wisconsin.

==== Regional Semifinals ====
March 23, 2012; 8:00 pm CDT	(1) Michigan	2–3 (OT) (1–1, 0–1, 1–0, 0–1)	(4) Cornell	Resch Center; Attendance: 3,465

Game reference

Shawn Hunwick
Goalies
Andy Iles
Referees:
Steve Morofsky
Ryan Sweeney

(Treais, Di Giuseppe) Luke Glendening (10) – 01:11	1 – 0
	1 – 1	10:10 – PP – John McCarron (6) (Collins, Birch)
	1 – 2	20:40 – SH – Joakim Ryan (7) (Collins)
(Moffatt, Bennett) Kevin Lynch (8) – 55:59	2 – 2
	2 – 3	63:35 – GW – Rodger Craig (2) (Miller, Mowrey)

10 min
Penalties
27 min
33
Shots
24

March 23, 2012; 4:30 pm CDT	(2) Ferris State	2–1 (0–0, 1–0, 1–1)	(3) Denver	Resch Center; Attendance: 3,465

Game reference

Taylor Nelson
Goalies
Sam Brittain
Referees:
Tom Fyrer
Tim Benedetto
Linesmen:
Chris Aughe
Marc Sullivan

(Thompson, Kirzinger) Jordie Johnston (19) – 24:30	1 – 0
(Alexander, Kane) Simon Denis (1) – GW – 42:54	2 – 0
	2 – 1	45:22 – Drew Shore (22) (Salazar, Ryder)

10 min
Penalties
8 min
34
Shots
26

==== Regional Final ====
March 24, 2012; 8:00 pm CDT	(2) Ferris State	2–1 (0–0, 0–0, 2–1)	(4) Cornell	Resch Center; Attendance: 3,108

Game reference

Taylor Nelson
Goalies
Andy Iles
Referees:
Scott Hansen
Kevin Shea
Linesmen:
Bob Bernard
Brandan Kelleher

(Kirzlinger, Johnston) Garrett Thompson (10) – PP – 40:11	1 – 0
	1 – 1	41:32 – Dustin Mowrey (8) (Gotovets)
(Huff, Kane) Jordie Johnston (20) – GW – 46:54	2 – 1

27 min
Penalties
12 min
21
Shots
23

=== East Regional – Bridgeport, Connecticut ===
==== Regional Semifinals ====
March 23, 2012; 3:00 pm EDT	(1) Union	3–1 (1–0, 1–1, 1–0)	(4) Michigan State	Webster Bank Arena; Attendance: 5,090

Game reference

Troy Grosenick
Goalies
Will Yanakeff
Referees:
Derek Shepherd
Marco Hunt
Linesmen:
Anthony Czech
Jeff Schultz

(Welsh) Max Novak (9) – 15:09	1 – 0
(Bodie) Jeremy Welsh (26) – GW – 23:20	2 – 0
	2 – 1	39:21 – PP – Matt Berry (11) (Perlini, Krug)
(Zajac) Wayne Simpson (18) – PP – 58:42	3 – 1

8 min
Penalties
23 min
32
Shots
21

March 23, 2012; 6:30 pm EDT	(2) Miami	3–4 (OT) (0–2, 0–1, 3–0, 0–1)	(3) Massachusetts–Lowell	Webster Bank Arena; Attendance: 5,090

Game reference

Connor Knapp
Goalies
Doug Carr
Referees:
Don Adam
Tim Walsh
Linesmen:
Robert Keltie
Tim Swiader

	0 – 1	01:34 – PP – Josh Holmstrom (12) (Wallin, Wilson)
	0 – 2	14:58 – SH – Colin Wright (4) (unassisted)
	0 – 3	22:21 – Riley Wetmore (13) (Vallorani, Arnold)
(McKenzie, Wideman) Trent Vogelhuber (4) – 43:06	1 – 3
(unassisted) Austin Czarnik (10) – 43:20	2 – 3
(Spinell) Alden Hirschfeld (11) – 49:56	3 – 3
	3 – 4	62:13 – GW – Riley Wetmore (13) (Arnold, Vallorani)

20 min
Penalties
21 min
33
Shots
30

==== Regional Final ====
March 24, 2012; 6:30 pm EDT	(1) Union	4–2 (1–0, 2–1, 1–1)	(3) Massachusetts–Lowell	Webster Bank Arena; Attendance: 5,328

Game reference

Troy Grosenick
Goalies
Doug Carr
Referees:
Derek Shepherd
Marco Hunt
Linesmen:
Anthony Czech
Jeff Schultz

(Bodie) Daniel Ciampini (3) – 03:03	1 – 0
(Carr, Jooris) Jeremy Welsh (27) – 27:12	2 – 0
	2 – 1	34:06 – Terrence Wallin (8) (Vallorani, Eiserman)
(Gostisbehere) Josh Jooris (8) – GW PP – 37:23	3 – 1
	3 – 2	45:40 – Matt Ferreira (14) (unassisted)
(unassisted) Kyle Bodie (6) – EN – 59:19	4 – 2

10 min
Penalties
6 min
39
Shots
21

=== West Regional – Saint Paul, Minnesota ===
==== Regional Semifinals ====
March 24, 2012; 12:30 pm CDT	(1) North Dakota	3–1 (1–0, 1–1, 1–0)	(4) Western Michigan	Xcel Energy Center; Attendance: 9,386

Game reference

Aaron Dell
Goalies
Frank Slubowski
Referees:
Tim Kotyra
Scott Whittemore
Linesmen:
Dave Brown
Justin Prusak

(MacMillan, Blood) Michael Parks (12) – 06:04	1 – 0
(Kristo, Nelson) Corban Knight (16) – GW – 23:16	2 – 0
	2 – 1	32:57 – Kyle O'Kane (7) (Roehl, DeKeyser)
(unassisted) Brock Nelson (28) – EN – 59:19	3 – 1

8 min
Penalties
6 min
28
Shots
25

March 24, 2012; 4:00 pm CDT	(2) Minnesota	7–3 (1–0, 3–2, 3–1)	(3) Boston University	Xcel Energy Center; Attendance: 9,386

Game reference

Kent Patterson
Goalies
Kieran Millan
Referees:
Chip McDonald
Peter Feola
Linesmen:
Rich Patry
Glenn Cooke

(Schmidt, Haula) Kyle Rau (18) – PP – 05:55	1 – 0
	1 – 1	27:49 – PP – Wade Megan (20) (Clendening, Chiasson)
(Condon, Boyd) Jake Parenteau (2) – 29:21	2 – 1
	2 – 2	33:20 – Ross Gaudet (5) (unassisted)
(Budish, Rau) Seth Helgeson (5) – 35:09	3 – 2
(Schmidt, Rau) Jake Hansen (14) – GW PP – 35:38	4 – 2
	4 – 3	43:09 – PP – Adam Clendening (4) (Noonan, Chiasson)
(unassisted) Nico Sacchetti (4) – 48:08	5 – 3
(Warning) Jake Hansen (15) – EN – 58:04	6 – 3
(Budish, Rau) Nick Bjugstad (25) – EN – 58:56	7 – 3

18 min
Penalties
29 min
42
Shots
34

==== Regional Final ====
March 25, 2012; 4:30 pm CDT	(1) North Dakota	2–5 (0–1, 1–3, 1–1)	(2) Minnesota	Xcel Energy Center; Attendance: 10,974

Game reference

Aaron Dell
Goalies
Kent Patterson
Referees:
Peter Feola
Tim Kotyra
Linesmen:
Dave Brown
Glenn Cooke

	0 – 1	12:19 – Ben Marshall (4) (Budish, Rau)
	0 – 2	20:20 – PP – Erik Haula (20) (Bjugstad, Hansen)
(Nelson, Panzarella) Danny Kristo (19) – 21:43	1 – 2
	1 – 3	29:08 – GW – Taylor Matson (8) (Schmidt, Parenteau)
	1 – 4	34:28 – Travis Boyd (1) (Condon, Matson)
	1 – 5	55:53 – Nate Condon (11) (Boyd, Budish)
(Gleason) Mario Lamoureux (4) – 56:07	2 – 5

8 min
Penalties
6 min
26
Shots
24

=== Frozen Four – Tampa, Florida ===
==== National Semifinals ====
April 5, 2012; 4:30 pm EDT	(E1) Union	1–3 (0–0, 1–1, 0–2)	(MW2) Ferris State	Tampa Bay Times Forum; Attendance: 18,605

Game reference

Troy Grosenick
Goalies
Taylor Nelson
Referees:
Kevin Shea
Scott Hansen
Linesmen:
Chris Aughe
Bob Bernard

Daniel Carr (20) (Coburn, Welsh) – 27:56	1 – 0
	1 – 1	37:02 – PP – Aaron Schmit (7) (Bonis, Czarnowczan)
	1 – 2	45:17 – GW – Kyle Bonis (19) (Wysopal)
	1 – 3	59:05 – EN – Aaron Schmit (8)

10 min
Penalties
4 min
28
Shots
37

April 5, 2012; 8:00 pm EDT	(NE1) Boston College	6–1 (1–0, 3–0, 2–1)	(W2) Minnesota	Tampa Bay Times Forum; Attendance: 18,605

Game reference

Parker Milner
Goalies
Kent Patterson
Referees:
Tim Kotyra
Pete Feola
Linesmen:
Glenn Cooke
Dave Brown

Steven Whitney (14) (Almeida, Arnold) – 06:03	1 – 0
Kevin Hayes (7) (Whitney, Cross) – GW PP – 26:35	2 – 0
Chris Kreider (23) (Straight) – 37:45	3 – 0
Paul Carey (16) (Mullane, Gaudreau) – 39:43	4 – 0
	4 – 1	41:26 – Jake Hansen (16) (Haula, Warning)
Paul Carey (17) (Gaudreau) – 41:48	5 – 1
Brian Dumoulin (7) (Kreider, Mullane) – PP – 45:51	6 – 1

25 min
Penalties
14 min
31
Shots
25

==== National Championship ====
April 7, 2012; 7:00 pm EDT	(NE1) Boston College	4–1 (2–1, 0–0, 2–0)	(MW2) Ferris State	Tampa Bay Times Forum; Attendance: 18,818

Game reference
Referees: Tim Kotyra; Peter Feola; Linesmen: Dave Brown; Glenn Cooke

Scoring summary
Period	Team	Goal	Assist(s)	Time	Score
1st	BC	Steven Whitney (15)	Almeida	03:18	1–0 BC
1st	FSU	Garrett Thompson (11)	Huff and Ouellette	05:19	1–1
1st	BC	Paul Carey (18) – GW PP	Dumoulin and Mullane	10:33	2–1 BC
2nd	None				
3rd	BC	Johnny Gaudreau (21)	Hayes and Wey	56:58	3–1 BC
3rd	BC	Steven Whitney (16) – EN	Arnold	58:57	4–1 BC
Penalty summary
Period	Team	Player	Penalty	Time	PIM
1st	FSU	Brett Wysopal	Tripping	08:42	2:00
2nd	FSU	Scott Czarnowczan	Roughing	22:31	2:00
2nd	BC	Michael Sit	Roughing	22:31	2:00
2nd	BC	Paul Carey	Tripping	24:48	2:00
2nd	BC	Tommy Cross	Hooking	30:35	2:00
2nd	BC	Bench (Served by Quinn Smith)	Too many men on ice	35:06	2:00
2nd	BC	Bill Arnold	Roughing	39:36	2:00
3rd	FSU	Brett Wysopal	Hooking	41:47	2:00
3rd	FSU	Brett Wysopal	Holding	48:32	2:00

Shots by period
Team	1	2	3	T
Ferris State	7	15	6	28
Boston College	8	14	15	37

Goaltenders
Team	Name	Saves	Goals against	Time on ice
FSU	Taylor Nelson	33	3	59:23
BC	Parker Milner	27	1	60:00

== Record by conference ==
Conference	# of Bids	Record	Win %	Regional Finals	Frozen Four	Championship Game	Champions
CCHA	5	3–5	.375	1	1	1	-
Hockey East	4	5–3	.625	2	1	1	1
WCHA	4	4–4	.500	3	1	-	-
ECAC Hockey	2	3–2	.600	2	1	-	-
Atlantic Hockey	1	0–1	.000	-	-	-	-

== Media ==
=== Television ===
ESPN had US television rights to all games during the tournament. For the eighth consecutive year ESPN aired every game, beginning with the regionals, on ESPN, ESPN2, and ESPNU, and ESPN3. They also streamed them online via WatchESPN.

==== Broadcast Assignments ====
Regionals

- East Regional: John Buccigross & Barry Melrose – Bridgeport, Connecticut
- Midwest Regional: Ben Holden & Sean Ritchlin – Green Bay, Wisconsin
- Northeast Regional: Joe Beninati & Billy Jaffe – Worcester, Massachusetts
- West Regional: Clay Matvick & Dave Starman – St. Paul, Minnesota

Frozen Four & Championship

- Gary Thorne, Barry Melrose, & Clay Matvick – Tampa, Florida

=== Radio ===
Dial Global Sports used exclusive radio rights to air both the semifinals and the championship, AKA the "Frozen Four."

- Sean Grande & Cap Raeder

== All-Tournament team ==
=== Frozen Four ===
- G: Parker Milner* (Boston College)
- D: Brian Dumoulin (Boston College)
- D: Chad Billins (Ferris State)
- F: Kyle Bonis (Ferris State)
- F: Paul Carey (Boston College)
- F: Steven Whitney (Boston College)

* Most Outstanding Player(s)

== See also ==
- 2012 NCAA Division I Women's Ice Hockey Tournament
