= Bill Arnold (ice hockey) =

American ice hockey center (born 1992)

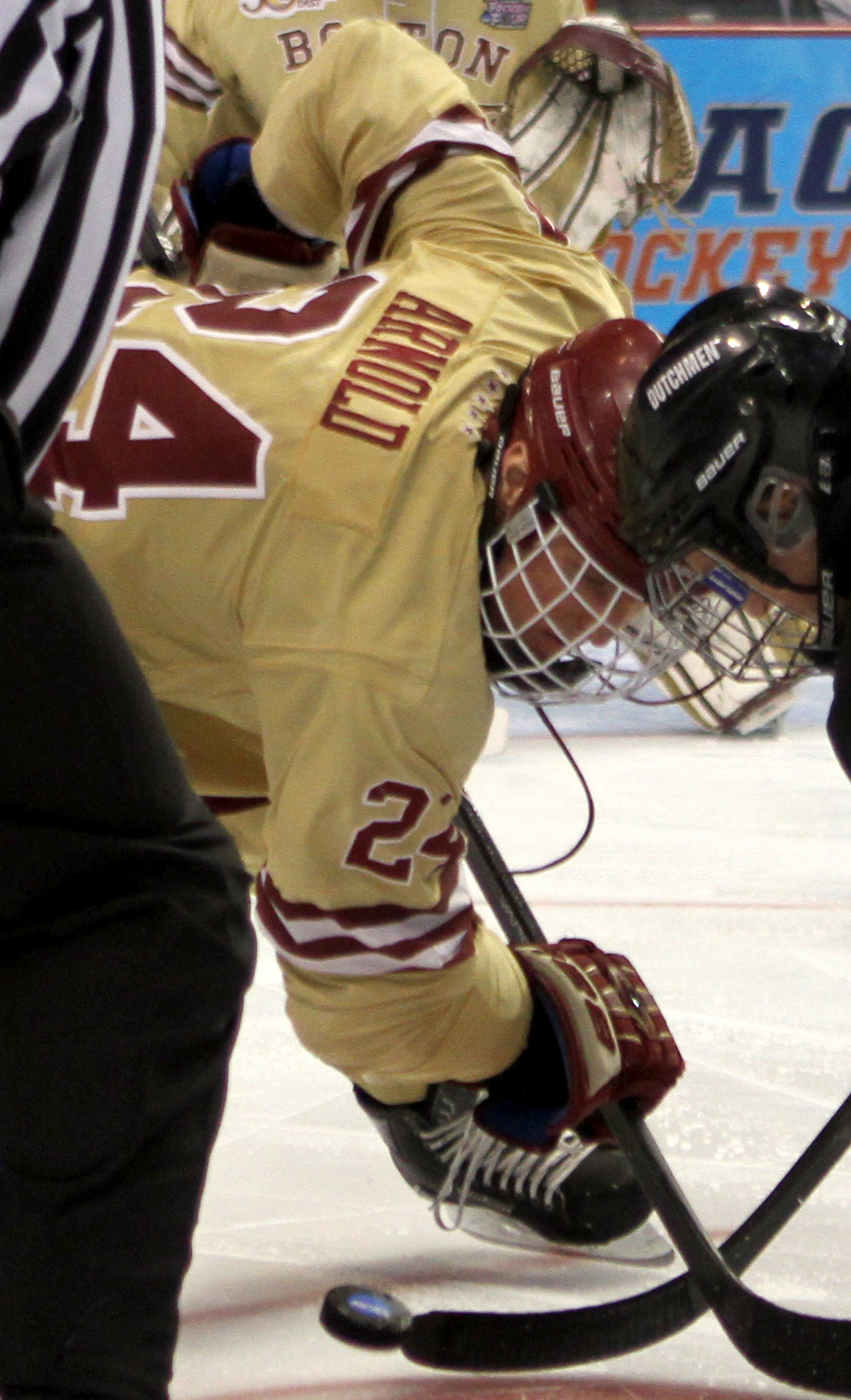
- Arnold with Boston College in 2014
- Born: May 13, 1992 (age 34) Needham, Massachusetts, U.S.
- Height: 6 ft 0 in (183 cm)
- Weight: 218 lb (99 kg; 15 st 8 lb)
- Position: Center
- Shot: Right
- Played for: Calgary Flames
- NHL draft: 108th overall, 2010; Calgary Flames
- Playing career: 2014–2016

William Norris Arnold (born May 13, 1992) is an American former professional ice hockey center who played one game with the Calgary Flames of the National Hockey League (NHL). He was a fourth-round selection of the Flames, 108th overall, at the 2010 NHL entry draft. Arnold played four seasons of college hockey for the Boston College Eagles between 2010 and 2014 and was a member of the school's 2012 national championship team.

== Playing career ==
=== College ===
A native of Needham, Massachusetts, Arnold attended and played high school hockey at Noble and Greenough School and the Boston Junior Bruins program before joining the USA Hockey National Team Development Program for the 2009–10 season. At the U-17 level, Arnold was team captain of a select team that participated in a five-nation tournament in Slovakia; he was named the tournament's most valuable player. At the 2010 IIHF World U18 Championships, Arnold recorded three points in six games as the National Team Development Program, representing the United States, won the gold medal. At the 2010 National Hockey League (NHL) Entry Draft, Arnold was selected in the fourth round, 108th overall, by the Calgary Flames.

Arnold committed to play college hockey at Boston College, where he joined the Eagles program in 2010. As a freshman in 2010–11, he recorded 20 points in 39 games. In his sophomore season, he joined the US National Junior Team for the 2012 World Junior Championship. Arnold recorded three goals and three assists in six games for the seventh place Americans. En route to a 36-point season with the Eagles, Arnold scored the winning goal in overtime to defeat Boston College's rival Boston University Terriers and win the 60th annual Beanpot tournament. He then capped his season with a national championship as Boston College won its final 19 games, culminating in a 4–1 victory over the Ferris State Bulldogs to win the 2012 Frozen Four tournament.

Following a 35-point season in 2012–13, Arnold completed his senior season on a line with close friends Johnny Gaudreau and Kevin Hayes. Arnold was praised by both his linemates and coach, Jerry York. They lauded him as being a player who excelled in all three zones of the ice, and who sacrificed personal stats for the benefit of his linemates. Arnold finished his college season with 14 goals and 53 points. For his college career, he recorded 159 points in 144 games.

=== Professional ===
Following Boston College's 5–4 loss in the 2014 Frozen Four semifinal to the Union Dutchmen, Arnold joined Gaudreau – who was also a Flames draft pick – in signing their first professional contracts. Arnold signed a two-year contract worth an average of $900,000 per season. He made his NHL debut in the Flames final game of the season, a 5–1 loss to the Vancouver Canucks on April 13, 2014. Arnold thus earned him a spot on the list of players who played only one game in the NHL.

Arnold spent the entirety of the 2014–15 and 2015–16 seasons playing for Calgary's AHL affiliate. He produced 24 goals and 60 points in 113 games over both seasons.

== Career statistics ==
=== Regular season and playoffs ===
			Regular season					Playoffs
Season	Team	League	GP	G	A	Pts	PIM	GP	G	A	Pts	PIM
2009–10	U.S. National Development Team	USHL	26	8	15	23	20	—	—	—	—	—
2010–11	Boston College Eagles	HE	39	10	10	20	38	—	—	—	—	—
2011–12	Boston College Eagles	HE	42	17	19	36	46	—	—	—	—	—
2012–13	Boston College Eagles	HE	38	17	18	35	40	—	—	—	—	—
2013–14	Boston College Eagles	HE	40	14	39	53	51	—	—	—	—	—
2013–14	Calgary Flames	NHL	1	0	0	0	0	—	—	—	—	—
2014–15	Adirondack Flames	AHL	61	15	23	38	30	—	—	—	—	—
2015–16	Stockton Heat	AHL	52	9	13	22	20	—	—	—	—	—
NHL totals			1	0	0	0	0	—	—	—	—	—

Medal record

Representing United States

Men's ice hockey

IIHF World U18 Championship
Gold medal – first place	2010 Belarus	

=== International ===
Year	Team	Event	Result	GP	G	A	Pts	PIM
2010	United States	WJC18	1st place, gold medalist(s)	6	1	2	3	6
2012	United States	WJC	7th	6	3	3	6	4
Junior totals				12	4	5	9	10

== See also ==
- List of players who played only one game in the NHL

Awards and achievements
Preceded by Tim Schaller	Hockey East Best Defensive Forward (with Ross Mauermann); 2013–14	Succeeded by Noel Acciari
