= Steven Whitney =

American ice hockey player (born 1991)

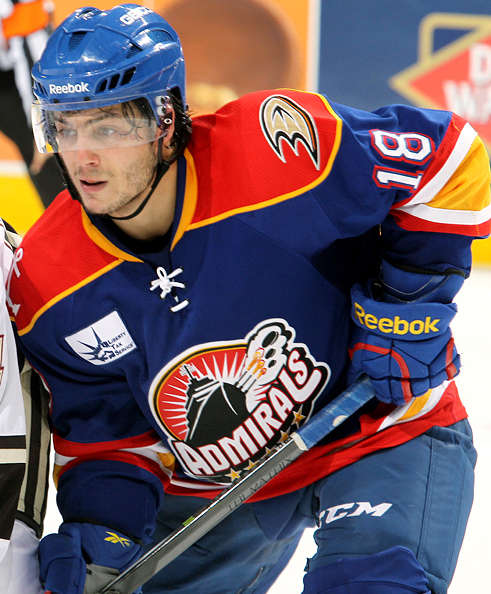
- Whitney with the Norfolk Admirals in 2013
- Born: February 18, 1991 (age 35) Reading, Massachusetts, U.S.
- Height: 5 ft 7 in (170 cm)
- Weight: 162 lb (73 kg; 11 st 8 lb)
- Position: Forward
- Shoots: Right
- Metal Ligaen team Former teams: Rungsted Seier Capital; Norfolk Admirals; Hershey Bears; Iserlohn Roosters; Stavanger Oilers; SC Langenthal
- NHL draft: Undrafted
- Playing career: 2013–present

Steven Whitney (born February 18, 1991) is an American professional ice hockey forward. He currently plays for Rungsted Seier Capital in the Metal Ligaen. He previously played for the Norfolk Admirals during their tenure in the American Hockey League (AHL) and the Hershey Bears.

== Playing career ==
Whitney played college hockey with the Boston College Eagles in the NCAA Men's Division I Hockey East conference. In his senior year, Whitney's outstanding play was rewarded with a selection to the 2012–13 All-Hockey East First Team. On April 4, 2013, Whitney was signed as an undrafted free agent to a two-year entry-level contract with the Anaheim Ducks.

After his first full professional season with Anaheim AHL affiliate, the Norfolk Admirals in the 2013–14 season, Whitney sought a release from his contract and on October 21, 2014, he was placed on unconditional waivers in confirming the end of his association with the Ducks. He signed with the Florida Everblades on Feb. 12, 2015.

On August 14, 2015, Whitney returned to the Norfolk Admirals, now placed in the ECHL, signing a one-year deal as a free agent. After two seasons in the ECHL with the Admirals, Whitney left as a free agent to sign with fellow competitors the South Carolina Stingrays on August 28, 2017.

On October 5, 2018, Whitney was announced to have secured an AHL contract with the Stingray's AHL affiliate, the Hershey Bears, making the opening night roster for the 2018–19 season.

On March 1, 2021, it was announced, Whitney signed a contract for the remainder of the season with German club, the Iserlohn Roosters where his brother Joe Whitney has played since November 27, 2020.

== Career statistics ==
=== Regular season and playoffs ===
			Regular season					Playoffs
Season	Team	League	GP	G	A	Pts	PIM	GP	G	A	Pts	PIM
2005–06	Lawrence Academy	USHS	30	7	10	17	12	—	—	—	—	—
2006–07	Lawrence Academy	USHS	29	23	30	53	16	—	—	—	—	—
2007–08	Lawrence Academy	USHS	30	15	22	37	22	—	—	—	—	—
2008–09	Lawrence Academy	USHS	30	20	33	53	20	—	—	—	—	—
2008–09	Omaha Lancers	USHL	12	4	10	14	10	3	0	1	1	6
2009–10	Boston College	HE	42	7	21	28	28	—	—	—	—	—
2010–11	Boston College	HE	36	6	10	16	56	—	—	—	—	—
2011–12	Boston College	HE	44	16	23	39	65	—	—	—	—	—
2012–13	Boston College	HE	38	26	19	45	54	—	—	—	—	—
2012–13	Norfolk Admirals	AHL	8	3	1	4	2	—	—	—	—	—
2013–14	Norfolk Admirals	AHL	65	10	13	23	52	2	0	0	0	0
2014–15	Florida Everblades	ECHL	23	8	8	16	22	10	2	1	3	2
2015–16	Norfolk Admirals	ECHL	66	23	32	55	51	—	—	—	—	—
2016–17	Norfolk Admirals	ECHL	2	0	0	0	2	—	—	—	—	—
2017–18	South Carolina Stingrays	ECHL	59	18	36	54	58	—	—	—	—	—
2018–19	Hershey Bears	AHL	60	9	7	16	26	9	1	2	3	8
2019–20	Hershey Bears	AHL	15	2	2	4	10	—	—	—	—	—
2019–20	South Carolina Stingrays	ECHL	5	5	4	9	6	—	—	—	—	—
2020–21	Hershey Bears	AHL	4	0	0	0	2	—	—	—	—	—
2020–21	Iserlohn Roosters	DEL	11	1	4	5	8	1	0	0	0	0
2021–22	Stavanger Oilers	FKL	33	12	19	31	26	15	7	8	15	12
2022–23	SC Langenthal	SL	38	21	21	42	8	5	3	3	6	0
2023–24	Rungsted Seier Capital	Denmark	47	10	28	38	16	4	1	0	1	0
2024–25	Rungsted Seier Capital	Denmark	45	21	17	38	57	12	3	4	7	2
DEL totals			11	1	4	5	8	1	0	0	0	0
FKL totals			33	12	19	31	26	15	7	8	15	12

=== International ===
Year	Team	Event	Result	GP	G	A	Pts	PIM
2008	United States	U17	2nd place, silver medalist(s)	6	2	2	4	6
Junior totals				6	2	2	4	6

== Awards and honors ==
Award	Year
College
NCAA All-Tournament Team	2012
All-Hockey East First Team	2012–13
AHCA East First-Team All-American	2012–13
