= Paul Carey (ice hockey) =

American ice hockey player (born 1988)

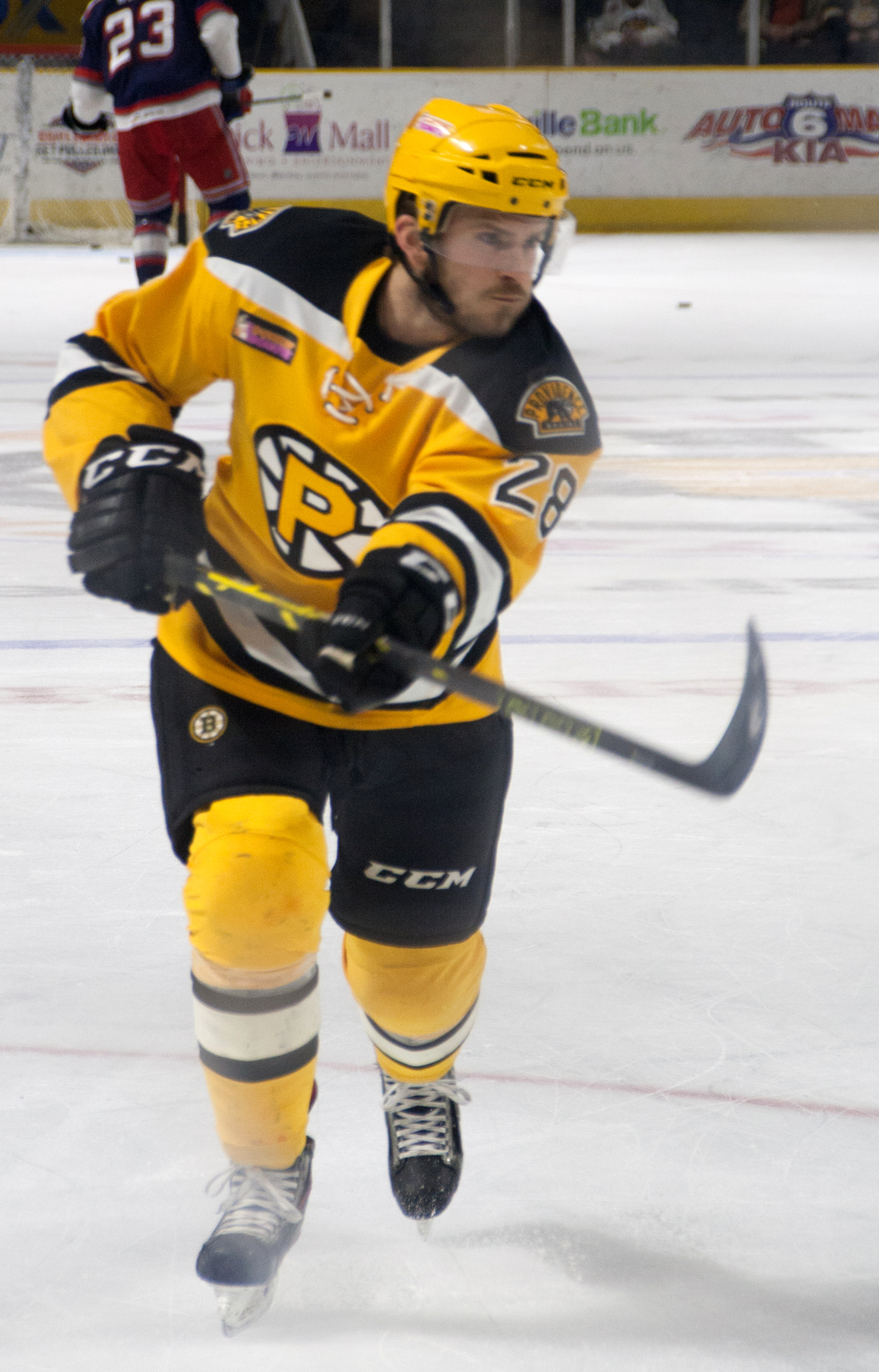
- Carey with the Providence Bruins in 2015
- Born: September 24, 1988 (age 38) Weymouth, Massachusetts, U.S.
- Height: 6 ft 3 in (191 cm)
- Weight: 190 lb (86 kg; 13 st 8 lb)
- Position: Center
- Shot: Left
- Played for: Colorado Avalanche; Washington Capitals; New York Rangers; Ottawa Senators; Boston Bruins; Djurgårdens IF
- NHL draft: 135th overall, 2007; Colorado Avalanche
- Playing career: 2012–2022

Paul Charles Carey (born September 24, 1988) is an American coach and former professional ice hockey center who played in the National Hockey League (NHL). After being drafted by the Colorado Avalanche in the 2007 NHL entry draft, Carey also played for the Washington Capitals, New York Rangers, Ottawa Senators, Boston Bruins, and Djurgårdens IF.

== Playing career ==
Carey was drafted by the Colorado Avalanche in the fifth round, 135th overall, in the 2007 NHL entry draft. Carey played two years at the Salisbury School in Connecticut before moving on to compete in the United States Hockey League with the Indiana Ice in the 2007–08 season and was a Rookie of the year finalist, before committing to play for the Boston College Eagles of the Hockey East in his freshman year in the 2008–09 season.

After capturing his first national title with the Eagles in his sophomore year, Carey repeated the feat in his senior year in 2012, scoring the championship winning goal against Ferris State University and earning selection to the Frozen Four All-Tournament team. Carey was subsequently signed by the Avalanche to a two-year entry-level contract on April 11, 2012. He was immediately assigned on an amateur try-out to begin his professional career and finish the duration of the season with AHL affiliate, the Lake Erie Monsters. He made his professional debut in a 5–3 victory over the Hamilton Bulldogs on April 13, 2012.

In his first full professional season in 2012–13, Carey was an offensive contributor for the Monsters. After scoring his first professional goal and point against the Oklahoma City Barons, on October 13, 2012, Carey played in 72 games to finish fourth amongst Lake Erie players with 19 goals and 41 points. During the season, Carey accounted for the team's longest individual point scoring streak at 8 games.

During the following 2013–14 season, despite a dip in his offensive numbers, Carey received his first NHL recall by the injury depleted Avalanche on March 11, 2014. He made his NHL debut with the Avalanche in a 3–2 victory over the Chicago Blackhawks on March 12.

Carey was assigned to the Lake Erie Monsters to begin the 2014–15 season. Amongst the top offensive producers on the Monsters, Carey was recalled by the Avalanche on multiple occasions and on February 15, 2015, in his 17th career game he recorded his first NHL point, an assist, in a 5–2 victory over the Arizona Coyotes. On March 2, 2015, Carey was traded by the Avalanche along with Maxime Talbot to his hometown team, the Boston Bruins, in exchange for Jordan Caron and a 6th-round draft pick in 2016.

On July 8, 2015, Carey signed as a free agent to a one-year, two-way contract with the Washington Capitals. He scored his first NHL goal on February 6, 2016, against Cory Schneider of the New Jersey Devils while playing in his third game for the Capitals. He was called up a day earlier for the second time of the season by the Capitals from the American Hockey League, where he was playing for the Hershey Bears.

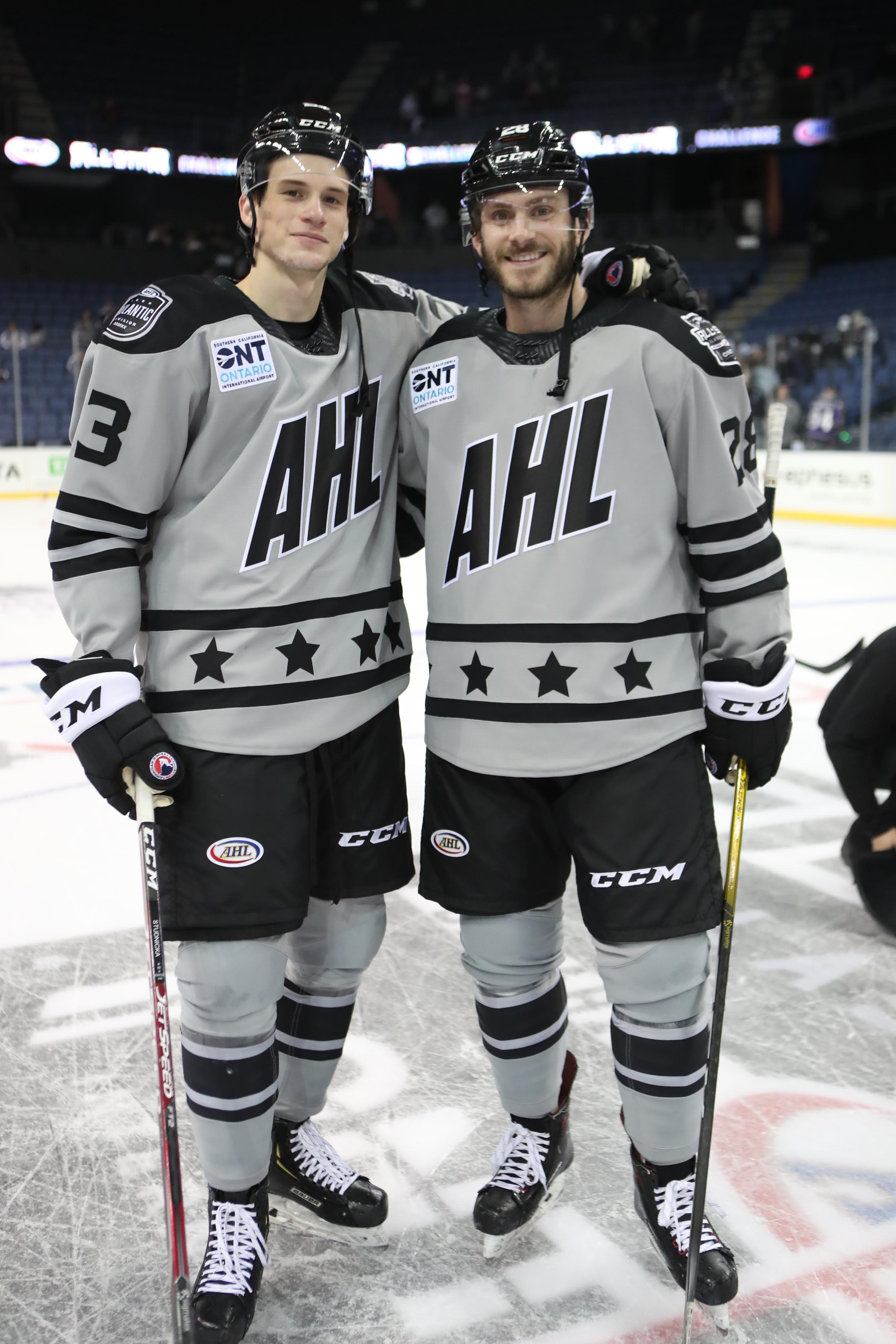
Carey and Jack Studnicka during the 2020 AHL All-Star Game.

After two seasons within the Capitals organization, Carey left as a free agent to sign a one-year, two-way contract with the New York Rangers on July 1, 2017. After enjoying a solid training camp and pre-season with the Rangers, and with Jesper Fast injured, Carey was named on the opening night roster to begin the 2017–18 season for the first time in his career. Carey was initially a healthy scratch before drawing into the lineup in a depth role. In contributing defensively and showing a two-way game, Carey set career markers of seven goals and 14 points in 60 games for the Rangers in completing his first full season in the NHL.

As a free agent in the following off-season, Carey left the Rangers to sign a one-year, two-way contract with the Ottawa Senators on July 1, 2018. After participating in the Senators 2018 training camp and pre-season, Carey remained on the opening roster for the 2018–19 season. He made his debut in helping the Senators claim their first win of the campaign in a 5–3 decision over the Toronto Maple Leafs on October 6, 2018. Carey was scoreless in five games for Ottawa before he was placed on waivers and sent to AHL affiliate, the Belleville Senators, on October 24. After 29 games in Belleville, Carey was traded by Ottawa and acquired for a second time by the Boston Bruins in exchange for Cody Goloubef on January 11, 2019. He was assigned to continue in the AHL with the Providence Bruins. On March 26, Carey signed a two-year, two-way contract extension with the Bruins.

On June 14, 2021, Carey signed as a free agent to a one-year contract with Swedish team Djurgårdens IF of the Swedish Hockey League (SHL). In his last professional season in 2021–22, Carey was unable to find his offensive touch in collecting just 4 goals and 12 points through 41 regular season games. He was unable to help prevent Djurgårdens IF from relegation to the HockeyAllsvenskan, going scoreless in four playout games.

== Coaching career ==
In ending his ten-year professional playing career, Carey returned to Boston College, and was added to the coaching staff as an assistant coach during the 2022–23 season on December 2, 2022.

== Career statistics ==
			Regular season					Playoffs
Season	Team	League	GP	G	A	Pts	PIM	GP	G	A	Pts	PIM
2003–04	Thayer Academy	HS Prep	26	2	1	3		—	—	—	—	—
2004–05	Thayer Academy	HS Prep	30	8	7	15		—	—	—	—	—
2005–06	Salisbury School	HS Prep	27	14	11	25	18	—	—	—	—	—
2006–07	Salisbury School	HS Prep	24	16	11	27	16	—	—	—	—	—
2007–08	Indiana Ice	USHL	60	34	32	66	32	4	1	2	3	2
2008–09	Boston College	HE	24	5	4	9	8	—	—	—	—	—
2009–10	Boston College	HE	41	9	12	21	29	—	—	—	—	—
2010–11	Boston College	HE	38	13	13	26	18	—	—	—	—	—
2011–12	Boston College	HE	44	18	12	30	30	—	—	—	—	—
2011–12	Lake Erie Monsters	AHL	2	0	0	0	2	—	—	—	—	—
2012–13	Lake Erie Monsters	AHL	72	19	22	41	29	—	—	—	—	—
2013–14	Lake Erie Monsters	AHL	54	8	13	21	42	—	—	—	—	—
2013–14	Colorado Avalanche	NHL	12	0	0	0	0	3	0	0	0	0
2014–15	Lake Erie Monsters	AHL	43	13	14	27	16	—	—	—	—	—
2014–15	Colorado Avalanche	NHL	10	0	1	1	0	—	—	—	—	—
2014–15	Providence Bruins	AHL	17	2	5	7	10	4	1	0	1	4
2015–16	Hershey Bears	AHL	44	13	18	31	18	—	—	—	—	—
2015–16	Washington Capitals	NHL	4	1	0	1	0	—	—	—	—	—
2016–17	Hershey Bears	AHL	55	24	31	55	29	4	1	1	2	0
2016–17	Washington Capitals	NHL	6	0	0	0	0	1	0	0	0	0
2017–18	New York Rangers	NHL	60	7	7	14	20	—	—	—	—	—
2018–19	Ottawa Senators	NHL	5	0	0	0	0	—	—	—	—	—
2018–19	Belleville Senators	AHL	29	5	22	27	16	—	—	—	—	—
2018–19	Providence Bruins	AHL	30	22	11	33	14	4	0	1	1	0
2018–19	Boston Bruins	NHL	2	0	0	0	0	—	—	—	—	—
2019–20	Providence Bruins	AHL	60	22	17	39	45	—	—	—	—	—
2019–20	Boston Bruins	NHL	1	0	0	0	0	—	—	—	—	—
2020–21	Providence Bruins	AHL	22	4	10	14	8	—	—	—	—	—
2021–22	Djurgårdens IF	SHL	41	4	8	12	12	—	—	—	—	—
AHL totals			428	132	163	295	229	12	2	2	4	4
NHL totals			100	8	8	16	20	4	0	0	0	0

== Awards and honors ==
Award	Year
USHL
Second All-Star Team	2008
All-Rookie Team	2008
College
NCAA All-Tournament Team	2012
