= Kevin Hayes =

American ice hockey player (born 1992)

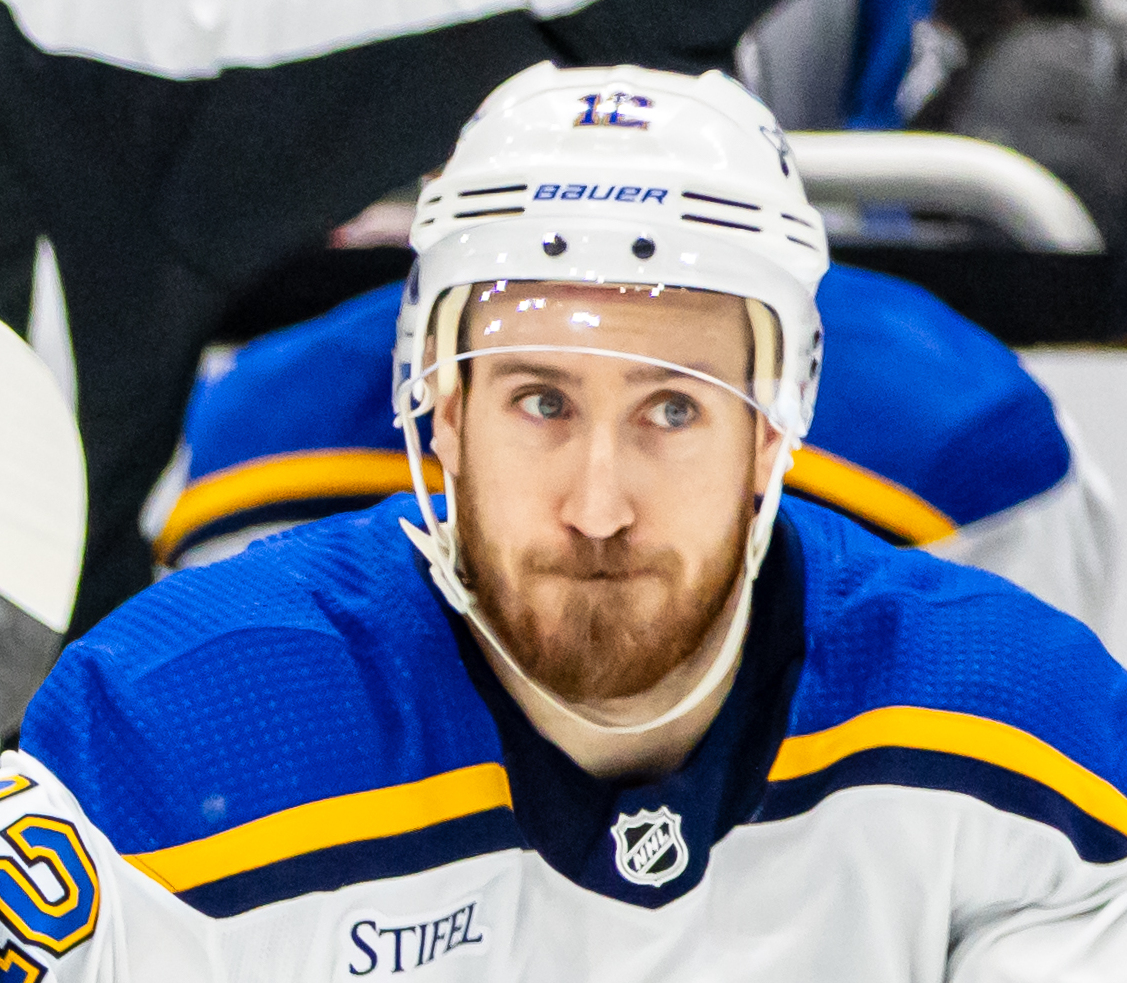
- Hayes with the St. Louis Blues in 2024
- Born: May 8, 1992 (age 34) Boston, Massachusetts, U.S.
- Height: 6 ft 5 in (196 cm)
- Weight: 217 lb (98 kg; 15 st 7 lb)
- Position: Forward
- Shot: Left
- Played for: New York Rangers; Winnipeg Jets; Philadelphia Flyers; St. Louis Blues; Pittsburgh Penguins; Ak Bars Kazan
- National team: United States
- NHL draft: 24th overall, 2010; Chicago Blackhawks
- Playing career: 2014–2026

Kevin Patrick Hayes (born May 8, 1992) is a retired American professional ice hockey forward. He played in the National Hockey League (NHL) for the New York Rangers, Winnipeg Jets, Philadelphia Flyers, St. Louis Blues, and Pittsburgh Penguins.

Growing up in the Dorchester neighborhood of Boston, Hayes played hockey for the Noble and Greenough School before being drafted by the Chicago Blackhawks in the first round, 24th overall, of the 2010 NHL entry draft. Hayes chose to defer his professional career and followed his older brother Jimmy, playing four seasons with the Boston College Eagles. In his senior year, Hayes was selected for the All-Hockey East First Team and AHCA East First-Team All-American as a result of his play.

Following his tenure at Boston College, Hayes signed his first professional contract with the New York Rangers in 2014 instead of the Blackhawks. He played five seasons in New York before being traded to the Winnipeg Jets at the 2019 NHL trade deadline. After finishing the 2018–19 NHL season with the Jets, the Flyers acquired Hayes on a seven-year, $50 million contract in 2019. In the first year of his new contract, Hayes was the recipient of the teams' Gene Hart Memorial Award as the player who displays the most "heart". After four seasons with the Flyers, he was traded to the St. Louis Blues, where he spent one season, before being traded to the Pittsburgh Penguins.

== Playing career ==
=== Amateur ===
Hayes got his start playing in the Quebec International Pee-Wee Hockey Tournament, representing South Shore in 2004 and 2005. He has said of the experience, "I thought it was just another fun tournament—you go to Canada with your family and play a lot of hockey, and go play in the snow and stuff." Hayes' South Shore teammates included future NHL players Noel Acciari, Chris Wagner, and Charlie Coyle. He played high school hockey at Noble and Greenough School in Dedham, Massachusetts, scoring 67 points in 28 games in the 2009–10 season, and was selected to participate in the 2010 U.S. National Junior Evaluation Camp. The Chicago Blackhawks chose Hayes in the first round, 24th overall, in the 2010 NHL entry draft, but he chose to attend Boston College, which had recruited Jimmy a few years before.

After scoring one goal and two assists in an exhibition game against the University of Toronto, Hayes recorded his first NCAA career point on October 15, 2010, in a 6–2 win over the Denver Pioneers. He sat out the second half of the 2010–11 season because of a posterior cruciate ligament injury, and finished with 14 points in 31 games. Hayes returned to the Eagles for a modest but successful 2011–12 season. He had an assist against the Air Force Falcons in the Northeast Regional semifinals of the 2012 NCAA Tournament, and scored a goal against the Minnesota Golden Gophers in the national semifinals. Boston College won the NCAA tournament, and Hayes finished the season with 28 points.

Despite recording six goals and 19 assists, Hayes had a beleaguered 2012–13 season. After recording 24 points with the Eagles, he received a suspension for a violation of team rules. Eagles head coach Jerry York said the duration of the suspension would depend on how Hayes responded. Then, in a February 26, 2013 match against UMass Lowell River Hawks, Hayes sustained an injury to a leg and lost consciousness in the locker room. He was rushed to the hospital, where he was diagnosed with compartment syndrome. He underwent four emergency surgeries on his left quadriceps femoris muscle and was hospitalized for 22 days. Hayes was told that his condition had been two hours from amputation had he not been treated, and there was doubt whether he would be able to return to hockey.

When he was allowed to return to play, Hayes' experience with compartment syndrome changed his outlook on hockey. He told the Boston Herald, "I think I always knew how important the game was to me, but I think I had to somewhat grow up a bit and take my body serious, take my school serious, take my strength and conditioning serious, and just a mixture of those three kind of allowed me to be the player I am today." Hayes returned his senior year on the Eagles' top line with Bill Arnold and Johnny Gaudreau, scoring 65 points (27 goals and 38 assists) in the 2013–14 NCAA season, and ending the season with 1.62 points per game, the second-highest in the country. Hayes was named the MVP of the 2014 Beanpot tournament and selected for the AHCA East First-Team All-American.

=== Professional ===
==== New York Rangers (2014–2019) ====
Hayes and the Blackhawks could not agree on a contract by the August 15 NHL deadline for college graduates, and Hayes became an unrestricted free agent in 2014. Less than a week later, the New York Rangers signed him to an entry-level contract with a base salary of $925,000 per season at the NHL level. The Blackhawks, meanwhile, received a second-round compensatory pick in the 2015 NHL entry draft, which eventually was used to select Graham Knott. Blackhawks' assistant general manager Norm Maciver called it "disappointing" Hayes chose not to sign with them saying the situation inspired the organization to become more aggressive about signing future draft picks like Michael Paliotta.

After signing his contract, Hayes attended the Rangers' 2014 training camp prior to the 2014–15 season. He made his NHL debut with the Rangers on October 12, 2014, in a home game against the Toronto Maple Leafs, playing alongside Carl Hagelin and J. T. Miller. He finished his debut with 14:17 of ice time in 19 shifts and a plus-minus of negative two. A few games later, while centering a line with Rick Nash and former Boston College teammate, Chris Kreider, Hayes scored his first career NHL goal against the San Jose Sharks. He finished the regular season ranking fifth among all league rookies in both points and assists as the Rangers qualified for the 2015 Stanley Cup playoffs. In the playoffs, Hayes tied for third among all rookies in points and tied for second with five assists. His first postseason goal was an overtime game winner in game four to beat the Pittsburgh Penguins and give them a 3–1 lead in the best-of-seven Eastern Conference first-round series. As the Rangers advanced through the playoffs, he scored the game-tying goal in an eventual overtime win over the Washington Capitals in the second round, and recorded an assist on Dominic Moore's late third period winner in game one of the Eastern Conference Final against the Tampa Bay Lightning.

While attending the Rangers' training camp before the 2015–16 season, head coach Alain Vigneault said he had decided to give Hayes a chance on the first line with Kreider and Derek Stepan. His scoring declined during the season, and after a goalless 16 games, he was a health scratch for the first time that season. Speaking of his decision, Vigneault said: "I think Kevin has had an extra-long leash, especially considering (Derek Stepan) was out for quite some time, but there’s just nothing going on." Hayes returned to the lineup in January after sitting out two games. Despite finishing the season recording only 14 goals and 22 assists for 36 points, the Rangers signed him to a two-year, $5.2 million contract extension.

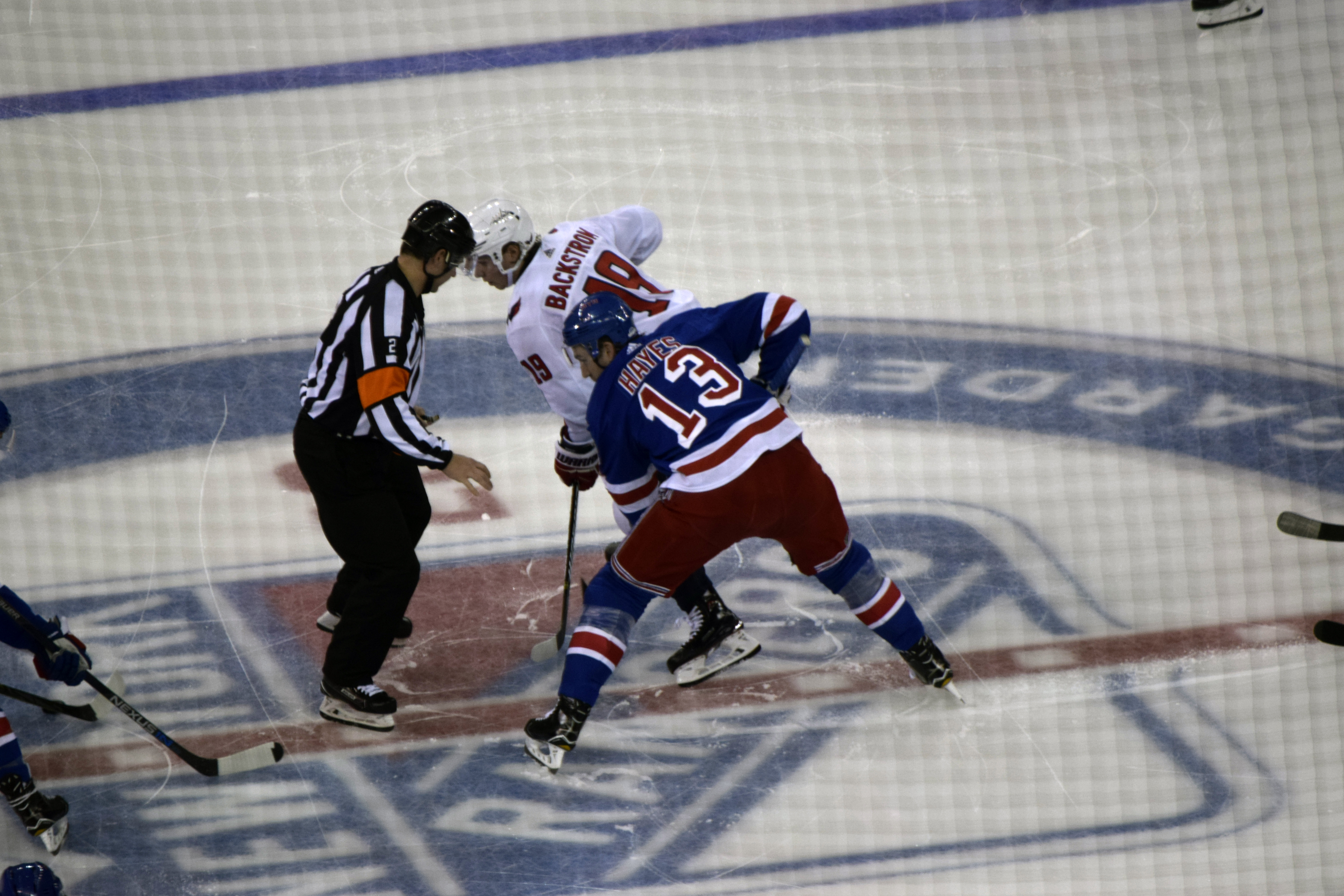
Hayes taking a faceoff against Nicklas Bäckström in December 2017

Before the 2016–17 season, Hayes reunited with a childhood friend, Jimmy Vesey, who had signed with the Rangers as a collegiate free agent. Due to their off-ice chemistry, Vigneault tried using them on a line together to start the season, but Hayes was eventually moved to the third line with Michael Grabner and Miller. On October 30, 2016, their line combined for nine points in an eventual 6–1 win over the Tampa Bay Lightning. Hayes began strong with 13 goals and 22 assists in 47 games before suffering a lower body injury during a game against the Detroit Red Wings in January. At the conclusion of the first year of his new contract, Hayes improved his offensive abilities, scoring 17 goals and 32 assists for 49 points. In 12 appearances at the 2017 Stanley Cup playoffs, Hayes recorded 0 goals and 3 assists, and the Rangers were eliminated in game six of the second round against the Ottawa Senators. The following season, Hayes missed six consecutive games due to another lower body injury, in this case leg contusions. Upon his return on January 25, 2018, he recorded an assist in the team's 6–5 win over the San Jose Sharks. On July 31, 2018, as a restricted free agent, Hayes re-signed a one-year contract with the Rangers.

In the 2018–19 season, his fifth with the Rangers, Hayes increased his offensive output, contributing 42 points in 51 games. Despite his strong record, after missing nine games with an upper-body injury, he acknowledged his tenure with the team might be ending. A few days after making this statement, he was traded at the NHL trade deadline to the Winnipeg Jets in exchange for a first-round pick in the 2019 NHL entry draft, Brendan Lemieux and a conditional fourth-round pick in the 2022 NHL Entry Draft. Hayes learned about the trade after Jets winger Blake Wheeler texted him "Welcome to the team."

==== Winnipeg Jets (2019) ====
Upon being acquired by the Winnipeg Jets, Hayes was placed on a line with Mark Scheifele and Wheeler. On March 1, he scored his first goal with the team, and recorded two assists in a 5–3 win over the visiting Nashville Predators. He was subsequently named the game's third star. Later that month, while playing on a line with Kyle Connor, Hayes helped the Jets qualify for the 2019 Stanley Cup playoffs. In the post-season, he played on the fourth line with Mathieu Perreault and Jack Roslovic during their First round matchup against the St. Louis Blues. During game three, he recorded his first goal of the series and included three shots on goal and a hit to beat the Blues 6–3.

==== Philadelphia Flyers (2019–2023) ====
Hayes' negotiating rights were traded to the Philadelphia Flyers on June 3, 2019, for a fifth-round draft pick in the 2019 Entry Draft. Later, on June 19, the Flyers signed Hayes to a seven-year, $50 million contract with an annual average of $7.14 million. The trade to Philadelphia meant a reunion for Hayes and Vigneault, who was hired as the Flyers head coach after being fired from the Rangers in 2018.

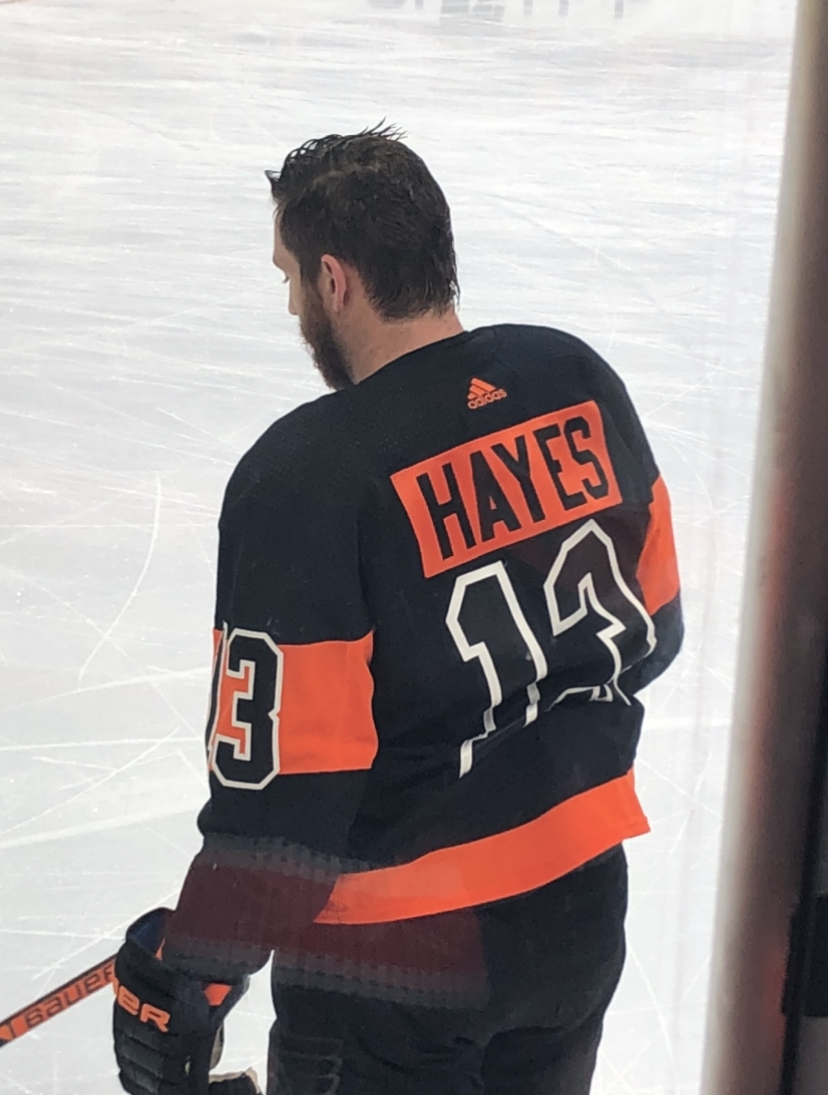
Hayes during his tenure with the Flyers

After a strong training camp performance on a line with James van Riemsdyk and Oskar Lindblom, Hayes made his debut in a preseason loss against the New York Islanders. He, Sean Couturier and Jakub Voráček were named alternate captains for the Flyers' 2019–20 season. Hayes scored his first goal with the team on a power play against the New Jersey Devils on October 9, 2019. Hayes played in all 69 regular season games, recording 23 goals and 18 assists by the time the NHL suspended the 2019–20 NHL season because of the COVID-19 pandemic. He recorded four short-handed goals and five game-winning goals, his career-best season in both. On July 6, 2020, Hayes was named the winner of the Gene Hart Memorial Award for the 2019–20 season, awarded to the player who displays the most "heart".

When the NHL returned to play, Hayes was one of the 31 players invited to Toronto for the 2020 Stanley Cup playoffs, playing on a line with Scott Laughton and Travis Konecny. He recorded six assists in as many games against the Montreal Canadiens in the first round of the playoffs and scored one goal in game six to advance to the second round. The Flyers fell to the Islanders in the second round of the Eastern Conference playoffs; Hayes finished the playoffs with four goals and nine assists.

Hayes was again named an alternate captain for the Flyers in the 2020–21 season, rotating the position with Voráček on away games, with Ivan Provorov serving as home alternate, and Couturier returning as permanent alternate. After a strong offensive start to the season, Hayes' performance began to slow, and he was disappointed in his "average year", telling reporters, "I want to help the team every single night and I feel like I haven't done that as much this year." Hayes finished the season with 12 goals and 19 assists in 55 games of the pandemic-shortened season, and was second on the team with 127 shots. Shortly after the conclusion of the season, Hayes underwent surgery for a sports hernia, with an expected five-week recovery period. He admitted, after the surgery, that he had begun feeling abdominal pain partway through the season, and that it was "tough to get going in games" after suffering the injury.

The 2021–22 season proved difficult for Hayes, as he had to deal with a blood infection and the aftermath of multiple surgeries. As well, his brother Jimmy died in August 2021 due to a drug overdose. Despite these tribulations, Hayes was able to play 48 games, recording 10 goals and 21 assists. He was named a finalist for the Bill Masterton Memorial Trophy, awarded to the player who "best exemplifies the qualities of perseverance, sportsmanship and dedication to hockey." In his final season with the Flyers, he was upgraded to the first line for the first five games due to Sean Couturier's injury before going to a lesser role for the rest of the season. He recorded eight points in those games, and had 54 points at the end of the season.

==== St. Louis Blues (2023–2024) ====
On June 27, 2023, the St. Louis Blues acquired Hayes from the Flyers in exchange for a sixth-round pick in the 2024 NHL entry draft. He had a slow start to the 2023–24 season, with only two goals in his first 17 games. After moving to a line with Alexey Toropchenko and Jake Neighbours on November 21, however, Hayes added seven goals in his next 13 games. This success was not sustained, as Hayes scored only four goals in the last 47 games of the season and was a healthy scratch for two of the Blues' last three games.

==== Pittsburgh Penguins (2024–2026) ====
On June 29, 2024, Hayes was traded, along with a second-round selection in the 2025 NHL entry draft to the Pittsburgh Penguins for future considerations. During the 2024–25 season, Hayes mainly played on a line with Philip Tomasino and Drew O'Connor and provided 13 goals and 22 assists. In the 2025–26 season, he was a healthy scratch at multiple times during the season. He also sustained a lower-body injury in March, returning to the lineup just before the end of the regular season.

==== Ak Bars Kazan and retirement (2026) ====
On August 25, 2026, Hayes signed a one-year contract with Ak Bars Kazan of the Kontinental Hockey League (KHL). After playing five games and scoring no points with Ak Bars, Hayes announced his decision to leave the team and retire from professional hockey on September 21, 2026.

== Playing style ==
Hayes is best known for his short-handed abilities, both in managing the penalty kill and in scoring short-handed goals. Flyers general manager Chuck Fletcher emphasized Hayes' 200-foot game when signing him to the organization. Hayes is also known for his close relationship with head coach Alain Vigneault, with whom he worked on the Rangers and Flyers. Hayes credits Vigneault with his development as a professional hockey player, saying, "I think I entered the league as an offensive guy and A.V. kind of turned me into a 200-foot player and an NHL guy. At the time, I don't know if I was super excited about it—fast-forward six years and I couldn't be more happy with where my game is at."

== International play ==
Hayes and his brother Jimmy were both selected to represent the United States national team at the 2014 IIHF World Championship in Minsk, Belarus. Upon being selected for Team USA with no NHL experience, Kevin said, "I want to prove to everyone that I can play the same way and do what I did all season [with the Eagles]." He skated in eight games in the tournament, where he recorded one goal and one assist.

Hayes was selected to represent the United States again at the 2017 IIHF World Championship where he played on a line with collegiate teammate and friend Johnny Gaudreau. He scored his first two goals of the tournament in a 5–3 win over Germany after trailing three times. The United States team ultimately failed to medal during the tournament after losing in their quarterfinal match against Finland.

== Personal life ==
Hayes was born in the Boston neighborhood of Dorchester on May 8, 1992, the youngest of five children. His older brother was former National Hockey League (NHL) player Jimmy Hayes. Hayes' cousins include New Jersey Devils general manager and former NHL player Tom Fitzgerald, and former NHL player Keith Tkachuk. Furthermore, Fitzgerald's sons Ryan and Casey were teammates with Hayes at Boston College and are both NHL prospects, and Tkachuk's sons Matthew and Brady are also on NHL rosters. He is a fan of the New England Patriots and the St. Louis Blues where Tkachuk played during Hayes' childhood. His closest friend in the NHL was former Boston College teammate Johnny Gaudreau, who was killed by a drunk driver on August 29, 2024. Hayes served as a pallbearer at his funeral.

Hayes is an advocate for Hockey Fights Cancer, as both of his parents are survivors. His mother Shelagh was diagnosed with colorectal cancer when Hayes was in middle school, and his father, Kevin Sr., was diagnosed with throat cancer during Hayes' sophomore year at Boston College.

Yards Brewing Company in Philadelphia released the "Big Hayes-y 13" beer in 2020, named after the Flyers' center. The beer is a New England IPA, a reference to Hayes' Boston upbringing.

Kevin was married to Katya Vasilyev on July 16, 2023. Their son was born in May 2025.

== Career statistics ==
=== Regular season and playoffs ===
			Regular season					Playoffs
Season	Team	League	GP	G	A	Pts	PIM	GP	G	A	Pts	PIM
2007–08	Noble and Greenough School	HS-Prep	29	8	5	13	2	—	—	—	—	—
2008–09	Noble and Greenough School	HS-Prep	23	28	27	55	15	—	—	—	—	—
2009–10	Noble and Greenough School	HS-Prep	29	25	44	69	8	—	—	—	—	—
2009–10	Cape Cod Whalers 18U AAA	MSHL	25	21	30	51	—	—	—	—	—	—
2009–10	U.S. NTDP U18	USDP	2	2	0	2	0	—	—	—	—	—
2010–11	Boston College	HE	31	4	10	14	8	—	—	—	—	—
2011–12	Boston College	HE	44	7	21	28	10	—	—	—	—	—
2012–13	Boston College	HE	27	6	19	25	14	—	—	—	—	—
2013–14	Boston College	HE	39	27	38	65	16	—	—	—	—	—
2014–15	New York Rangers	NHL	79	17	28	45	22	19	2	5	7	2
2015–16	New York Rangers	NHL	79	14	22	36	30	3	0	0	0	4
2016–17	New York Rangers	NHL	76	17	32	49	18	12	0	3	3	4
2017–18	New York Rangers	NHL	76	25	19	44	18	—	—	—	—	—
2018–19	New York Rangers	NHL	51	14	28	42	10	—	—	—	—	—
2018–19	Winnipeg Jets	NHL	20	5	7	12	2	6	2	1	3	2
2019–20	Philadelphia Flyers	NHL	69	23	18	41	34	16	4	9	13	2
2020–21	Philadelphia Flyers	NHL	55	12	19	31	22	—	—	—	—	—
2021–22	Philadelphia Flyers	NHL	48	10	21	31	26	—	—	—	—	—
2022–23	Philadelphia Flyers	NHL	81	18	36	54	23	—	—	—	—	—
2023–24	St. Louis Blues	NHL	79	13	16	29	12	—	—	—	—	—
2024–25	Pittsburgh Penguins	NHL	64	13	10	23	8	—	—	—	—	—
2025–26	Pittsburgh Penguins	NHL	28	4	4	8	8	—	—	—	—	—
2026–27	Ak Bars Kazan	KHL	5	0	0	0	0	—	—	—	—	—
NHL totals			805	185	261	446	233	56	8	18	26	14

=== International ===
Year	Team	Event	Result	GP	G	A	Pts	PIM
2009	United States	U18	4th	4	2	1	3	0
2014	United States	WC	6th	8	1	1	2	0
2017	United States	WC	5th	3	2	2	4	4
2024	United States	WC	5th	8	1	0	1	4
Senior totals				4	2	1	3	0
Junior totals				19	4	3	7	8

== Awards and honors ==
Award	Year	Refs
College
All-Hockey East First Team	2014	
AHCA East First-Team All-American	2014	
NHL
Gene Hart Memorial Award	2020	
All-Star Game	2023	

Awards and achievements
Preceded by Dylan Olsen	Chicago Blackhawks first-round draft pick 2010	Succeeded by Mark McNeill
