= Patrick Wey =

American ice hockey player

- Born: March 21, 1991 (age 35) Pittsburgh, Pennsylvania, U.S.
- Height: 6 ft 3 in (191 cm)
- Weight: 207 lb (94 kg; 14 st 11 lb)
- Position: Defense
- Shot: Right
- Played for: Washington Capitals
- NHL draft: 115th overall, 2009; Washington Capitals
- Playing career: 2013–2015

Patrick Sean Wey (born March 21, 1991) is an American former professional ice hockey defenseman. Before retiring in 2015, he played with the Washington Capitals of the National Hockey League (NHL). Wey was selected by the Capitals in the 4th round (115th overall) of the 2009 NHL entry draft.

== Playing career ==
Before turning professional, Wey played four seasons (2009-2013) of NCAA Division I hockey with the Boston College Eagles men's ice hockey team, helping Boston College to win the NCAA national championship in both 2010 and 2012.

On April 5, 2013, the Washington Capitals signed Wey to a two-year, entry-level contract, and he began the 2013–14 season in the ECHL with the Reading Royals where he scored three points in eight games. On November 14, 2013. Wey made his AHL debut with the Hershey Bears, scoring his first AHL goal on November 24, 2013.

On December 5, 2013, the Washington Capitals recalled Wey from Hershey, replacing defenseman Tyson Strachan on the NHL roster. On December 10, 2013, after appearing in one game with the Capitals, Wey was reassigned to the Hershey Bears.

On June 29, 2015, Wey announced he was retiring from professional hockey to pursue educational interests. He stated that the reason for his early retirement are multiple concussions that he suffered within several months: one while playing for the Washington Capitals (fight against Richard Clune) on March 30, 2014, and the second while playing for the Hershey Bears (elbow to the head by Jay Rosehill) on October 24, 2014.

== Career statistics ==
=== Regular season and playoffs ===
			Regular season					Playoffs
Season	Team	League	GP	G	A	Pts	PIM	GP	G	A	Pts	PIM
2007–08	Waterloo Black Hawks	USHL	35	1	5	6	30	8	1	0	1	2
2008–09	Waterloo Black Hawks	USHL	58	7	27	34	75	3	0	0	0	0
2009–10	Boston College	HE	27	0	5	5	24	—	—	—	—	—
2010–11	Boston College	HE	37	1	7	8	45	—	—	—	—	—
2011–12	Boston College	HE	32	2	5	7	24	—	—	—	—	—
2012–13	Boston College	HE	37	1	12	13	54	—	—	—	—	—
2013–14	Reading Royals	ECHL	8	0	3	3	6	—	—	—	—	—
2013–14	Hershey Bears	AHL	28	1	5	6	26	—	—	—	—	—
2013–14	Washington Capitals	NHL	9	0	3	3	5	—	—	—	—	—
2014–15	Hershey Bears	AHL	3	0	0	0	2	—	—	—	—	—
NHL totals			9	0	3	3	5	—	—	—	—	—

=== International ===
Year	Team	Event	Result	GP	G	A	Pts	PIM
2011	United States	WJC	3rd place, bronze medalist(s)	6	0	0	0	2
Junior totals				6	0	0	0	2

Awards and achievements
Preceded by Brian Dumoulin	Hockey East Best Defensive Defenseman; 2012–13	Succeeded by Josh Manson
