= Joey (name) =

- Pronunciation: /ˈdʒoʊi/
- Gender: Unisex

Other names
- Related names: Josiah, Joseph, Josephine, Joe, Joel, Jo, Joanna, Joan

Joey is a unisex given name or nickname, more commonly used for males. It can be a diminutive of names that begin with J, most commonly Joseph, Joshua, Joe, Josephine and Johanna.

== People with the given name Joey ==
=== Male ===
- Joey Abell (born 1981), American professional boxer
- Joey Abs (born 1971), American retired professional wrestler
- Joey Adams (1911–1999), American comedian, vaudevillian, radio host, nightclub performer, and author
- Joey Aguilar (born 2001), American college football player
- Joey Aiuppa (1907–1997), American mobster
- Joey Akpunonu (born 2001), American USL and MLS player
- Joey Alders (born 1999), Dutch racing driver
- Joey Alexander (born 2003), Indonesian jazz pianist
- Joey Allaham, Syrian-born American businessman and entrepreneur
- Joey Allen (sailor), New Zealand sailor
- Joey Altman, American chef, restaurateur, television host, and writer
- Joey Alves (?–2017), American member of hard rock/heavy metal band Y&T
- Joey Amalfitano (born 1934), American former MLB player, manager, and coach
- Joey Ambrose (1934–2021), American saxophonist; member of rock and roll band Bill Haley & His Comets
- Joey Ammo, American past member of post-grunge band Birdbrain (band)
- Joey Anderson (born 1998), American NHL player
- Joey Andrews, American politician
- Joey Ansah (born 1982), English actor, director, and martial artist
- Joey Antipas, Zimbabwean football coach
- Joey Antonioli (born 2003), Dutch professional footballer
- Joey Archer (born 1938), American retired boxer
- Joey Archibald (1914–1998), American boxing champion
- Joey Aresco (born 1949), American film- and television actor
- Joey Arias, American artist, singer, author, comedian, stage persona, and film actor
- Joey Armstrong, American past member of punk rock band SWMRS
- Joey Arrington (born 1956), American former NASCAR driver, team owner, and crew chief
- Joey Attawia, English costume designer and film- and television producer
- Joey Ayala (born 1956), Filipino singer, songwriter, and musician
- Joey B (born 1989), Ghanaian hip hop recording artist
- Joey Badass (born 1995), American rapper and actor
- Joey Baker (born 2000), American professional basketball player
- Joey Banes (born 1967), American former NFL player
- Joey Baron (born 1955), American avant-garde jazz drummer
- Joey Barrington (born 1979), English former professional squash player
- Joey Bart (born 1996), American MLB catcher
- Joey Barton (born 1982), English professional football manager and former player
- Joey Batey (born 1989), English actor, musician, singer, and songwriter
- Joey Beauchamp (1971–2022), English professional footballer
- Joey Belladonna (born 1960), American singer; member of thrash metal band Anthrax (American band)
- Joey Belterman (born 1993), Dutch footballer
- Joey Beltram (born 1971), American DJ and music producer
- Joey Beltran (born 1981), American bare-knuckle fighter and mixed martial artist
- Joey Belville, American member of electronic music- and synthpop band The Echoing Green (band)
- Joey Benin, Filipino bassist, singer, producer, and musical arranger; past member of pop band Side A (group)
- Joey Benjamin (1961–2021), St. Kitts-born English cricketer
- Joey Bishop (1918–2007), American entertainer
- Joey Blake (born 1967), American former professional tennis player
- Joey Blount (born 1998), American NFL player
- Joey Boland (born 1987), Irish hurler
- Joey Bond (born 1948), Romanian-born American author, composer, and teacher of tai chi
- Joey Bosa (born 1995), American NFL player
- Joey Boy (born 1974), Thai hip hop singer and producer
- Joey Bradford (born 1989), American professional BMX racer
- Joey Bragg (born 1996), American actor and comedian
- Joey Brains, stage name of Braintax
- Joey Brezinski, American street skateboarder
- Joey Brinson (born 1976), American wheelchair fencer
- Joey Brock (born 1988), Dutch professional footballer
- Joey Brocken, contestant on De beste singer-songwriter van Vlaanderen
- Joey Browner (born 1960), American former NFL player
- Joey Bruce, American past member of alternative rock band Anberlin
- Joey Brush (1955–2015), American businessman and politician
- Joey Burns, American member of indie rock band Calexico (band)
- Joey Bustos, American musician
- Joey Butler (born 1986), American former MLB- and NPB player
- Joey Buttafuoco (born 1956), American auto body shop owner and convicted criminal
- Joey Calcaterra (born 1998), American professional basketball player
- Joey Calderazzo (born 1965), American jazz pianist
- Joey Calistri (born 1993), American former professional soccer player
- Joey Camen (born 1957), American voice actor, comedian, and writer
- Joey Cantens (born 1986), American professional basketball coach
- Joey Cantillo (born 1999), American MLB pitcher
- Joey Cape (born 1966), American singer and musician; lead singer of California punk band Lagwagon
- Joey Caputo (born 2000), Australian rugby union player
- Joey Carbery (born 1995), Irish rugby union player
- Joey Carbone, American composer, music producer, arranger, keyboardist, vocalist, advisor, and educator
- Joey Carbstrong, Australian animal rights activist, and former criminal
- Joey Carew (1937–2011), West Indian cricketer
- Joey Castillo (born 1966), American musician
- Joey Cavalieri, American writer and editor of comic books
- Joey Cheek (born 1979), American former speed- and inline speed skater
- Joey Chernyim (born 1974), Ghanaian-born Thai comedian, actor, and former footballer
- Joey Chestnut (born 1983), American competitive eater
- Joey Clanton (born 1972), American race car driver and businessman
- Joey Clement, American past member of pop rock band Selena Gomez & the Scene
- Joey Clements, American son of Roman Catholic priest and activist George Clements
- Joey Clinkscales (born 1964), American NFL executive and former player
- Joey Comeau (born 1980), Canadian writer
- Joey Concepcion, Swedish member of melodic death metal band Armageddon (Swedish band)
- Joey Cora (born 1965), Puerto Rican former MLB player
- Joey Corcoran (born 2000), Canadian football player
- Joey Corpus (1957–2017), Filipino-American violinist and violin teacher
- Joey Coulter (born 1990), American professional stock car racing driver
- Joey Covington (1945–2013), American drummer, singer, songwriter, and producer
- Joey Coyle (1953–1993), American unemployed longshoreman
- Joey Crabb (born 1983), American former NHL player
- Joey Cramer (born 1973/1974), Canadian actor
- Joey Crawford (born 1951), American retired NBA referee
- Joey Cristofanilli, American bassist
- Joey Cupido (born 1990), Canadian NLL player
- Joey Curletta (born 1994), American former professional baseball player
- Joey Curtis (1925–2004), American professional boxer, referee, and business owner
- Joey Daccord (born 1996), Swiss-American NHL player
- Joey Daddiego, American former professional wrestler
- Joey Dale (born 1993), Dutch DJ, record producer, and musician
- Joey Davis (born 1993), American professional mixed martial artist and graduated folkstyle wrestler
- Joey Dawley (born 1971), American former MLB pitcher
- Joey Dawson (born 2003), English professional footballer
- Joey Deacon (1920–1981), British author and television personality
- Joey Dedio (born 1963), American actor
- Joey Dee (born 1937), American member of music group Joey Dee and the Starliters
- Joey Defilipps, American past member of band Gravy (band)
- Joey DeFrancesco (1971–2022), American jazz organist, trumpeter, saxophonist, and singer
- Joey DeGraw (born 1973), American singer-songwriter, musician, voiceover actor, and co-owner of The National Underground bar and record label
- Joey De Jesus, American writer, performer, community activist, and political candidate
- Joey Dekkers (born 1989), Dutch footballer
- Joey de Leon (born 1946), Filipino comedian, actor, television host, and songwriter
- Joey DeMaio, American bass guitarist and main songwriter for heavy metal band Manowar, and jazz, rap, and ballet dancer
- Joey DeNato (born 1992), American former MLB pitcher
- Joey DeSimone (born 1973), birth name of Joée, Canadian dance musician
- Joey Devine (born 1983), American former MLB pitcher
- Joey DeZart (born 1998), American-born Jamaican USLC player
- Joey Diamond, American player in the 2012 Hockey East men's ice hockey tournament
- Joey Diaz (born 1963), Cuban-American stand-up comedian, actor, podcaster, and author
- Joey Didulica (born 1977), Australian-born Croatian former footballer
- Joey DiGiamarino (born 1977), American MLS player
- Joey Dillon (born 1992), American soccer player
- Joey DiPaolo (born 1979), American AIDS activist
- Joey Donnelly (1909–1992), Irish international footballer
- Joey Dorsey (born 1983), American former professional basketball player
- Joey Dosik (born 1985/1986), American singer-songwriter and multi-instrumentalist
- Joey Dujardin (born 1996), Belgian footballer
- Joey Dunlop (1952–2000), Northern Irish motorcyclist
- Joey Durel (born 1953), American former mayor
- Joey Eijpe (born 1988), Dutch former professional baseball player
- Joey Eischen (born 1970), American former MLB relief pitcher
- Joey Elliott (born 1986), American former CFL player, and current NFL scouting staff member
- Joey Ellis (disambiguation), several people
- Joey Eloms (born 1976), American former NFL player
- Joey Elwood, American co-founder of record label Gotee Records
- Joey Eppard (born 1976), American music writer, recording artist, and lead vocalist- and guitarist of progressive rock band 3
- Joey Essex (born 1990), English television personality
- Joey Estes (born 2001), American MLB pitcher
- Joey Evison (born 2001), English cricketer
- Joey Falzon (born 1969), Australian-born Maltese former professional footballer and current manager
- Joey Fanfarelli, American professor
- Joey Fatone (born 1977), American singer, dancer, actor, and television host; member of boy band NSYNC
- Joey Fatts (born 1991), American rapper, songwriter, and record producer
- Joey Faye (?–1997), American comedian and actor
- Joey Field (born 2000), New Zealand cricketer
- Joey Fillingane (born 1973), American politician
- Joey Fimmano, Australian musician and entertainer
- Joey Fink (born 1951), American retired NASL- and MISL player
- Joey Fischer (1975–1993), American murder victim
- Joey Fisher (American football) (born 1997), American NFL player
- Joey Florez (born 1993), American scholar and cultural critic
- Joey Forman (1929–1982), American comedian and comic actor
- Joey Foster (born 1982), British racing driver
- Joey Franco (born 1951), American drummer
- Joey French, American record producer and recording engineer
- Joey Gallo (born 1993), American MLB player
- Joey Galloway (born 1971), American former NFL player, and current ESPN analyst
- Joey Gamache (born 1966), American boxing trainer and former professional boxer
- Joey Garcia (born 1983), American attorney and politician
- Joey Gase (born 1993), American NASCAR driver
- Joey Gathright (born 1981), American former MLB player
- Joey Gattina (born 1979), American professional stock car racing driver
- Joey Gay (born c. 1971), American actor and comedian
- Joey Gerber (born 1997), American MLB pitcher
- Joey Ghazal (born 1978), Lebanese Canadian restaurateur and commercial developer
- Joey Giambra (boxer) (1931–2018), American boxer
- Joey Giambra (musician) (1933–2020), American jazz musician, actor, and businessman
- Joey Giardello (1930–2008), American boxer
- Joey Gibbs (born 1992), Australian footballer
- Joey Gibson (disambiguation), several people
- Joey Gilbert (born 1976), American retired professional boxer, attorney, and sports agent
- Joey Gilmore (born 1944), American blues singer, songwriter, and guitarist
- Joey Gjertsen (born 1982), American professional soccer player
- Joey Glimco (1909–1991), Italian-American labor leader and organized crime figure
- Joey Godee (born 1989), Dutch footballer
- Joey Goebel (born 1980), American author
- Joey Goodspeed (born 1978), American former NFL player
- Joey Gosiengfiao (1941–2007), Filipino movie director, producer, and writer
- Joey Graceffa (born 1991), American YouTuber, vlogger, actor, author, and producer
- Joey Graham (born 1982), American former NBA player
- Joey Graziadei (born 1995), American television personality and tennis coach
- Joey Greco (born 1972), American television personality
- Joey Green (born 1958), American author
- Joey Gregorash, Canadian singer and musician
- Joey Grima (born 1973), Australian professional rugby league football coach
- Joey Grimaldi (1778–1837), English actor, comedian, and dancer who performed as "Joey The Clown"
- Joey Grist, American former politician
- Joey Groenbast (born 1995), Dutch footballer
- Joey Guðjónsson (born 1980), Icelandic former professional footballer
- Joey Gutierrez (born 1963), American writer and producer of television sitcoms
- Joey Hackett (born 1958), American former NFL player
- Joey Hadorn (born 1997), Swiss orienteering competitor
- Joey Halzle (born 1986), American football coach and former player
- Joey Hamilton (born 1970), American former MLB pitcher
- Joey Hammond (born 1977), American baseball coach and former utility player
- Joey Hand (born 1979), American professional racing driver
- Joey Hanssen (born 1991), Dutch racing driver
- Joey Harrell (born 1985), American former professional basketball player
- Joey Harrington (born 1978), American former NFL player
- Joey Harris (born 1980), American former NFL player
- Joey Hauser (born 1999), American professional basketball player
- Joey Hawkins (born 1981), American former NFL player
- Joey Hayes (born 1976), English professional rugby league footballer
- Joey Haynos (born 1984), American former NFL player
- Joey Haywood (born 1984), Canadian-born Trinidad and Tobago former NBL-, NBLC-, and CEBL player
- Joey Heindle (born 1993), German singer
- Joey Hensley (born 1955), American politician
- Joey Hernandez (born 1984), Cuban American boxer
- Joey Hishon (born 1991), Canadian former NHL player
- Joey Holden (born 1990), Irish hurler
- Joey Hollingsworth (born 1937), Black Canadian tap dancer, singer, conga player
- Joey Hood (born 1976), American politician
- Joey Hope (born 2002), English footballer
- Joey Huffman (born 1962), American musician, producer, and songwriter
- Joey Hunt (born 1994), American NFL player
- Joey Hunting, American past member of hard rock group The Outpatience
- Joey Hutchinson (born 1982), English former professional footballer
- Joey Iest (born 2003), American professional stock car racing driver
- Joey Image (1957–2020), American punk rock drummer
- Joey Iosefa (born 1991), American former NFL player
- Joey Ivie (born 1995), American NFL player
- Joseph Jackson (disambiguation), several people
- Joseph Jacobs (disambiguation), several people
- Joey Jagan, Guyanese dentist and politician
- Joey Janela (born 1989), American professional wrestler
- Joey Jay (born 1935), American former MLB starting pitcher
- Joey Jay (drag queen) (born 1990), American drag performer
- Joey Jett (born 1998), American professional skateboarder
- Joey Johns (born 1974), Australian rugby footballer
- Joseph Johnson (disambiguation), several people
- Joey Johnston (born 1949), Canadian NHL coach and former player
- Joey Jones (disambiguation), several people
- Joey Jordison (1975–2021), American drummer of heavy metal band Slipknot, and guitarist of horror punk supergroup Murderdolls
- Joey Julius (born 1995), American former college football player
- Joey Karam, American musician and singer; past member of hardcore punk band The Locust
- Joey Katebian (born 1995), Australian soccer player
- Joey Keane (born 1999), American KHL player, and past USHL-, OHL-, AHL- and NHL player
- Joey Kelly (born 1972), Spanish musician, songwriter, and athlete
- Joey Kennedy, American journalist and newspaper editor
- Joey Kent (born 1974), American former NFL player
- Joey Kern (born 1976), American actor and director
- Joey Kibble, American member of a cappella gospel group Take 6
- Joey Kilburn (born 1949), Canadian bobsledder
- Joey Kirk (born 1965), American former soccer player
- Joey Kitson (born 1969), Canadian musician; lead singer of Celtic rock band Rawlins Cross
- Joey Klein, Canadian actor and film director
- Joey Konings (born 1998), Dutch professional footballer
- Joey Kovar (1983–2012), American model, reality television star, and bodybuilder
- Joey Kramer (born 1950), American drummer and percussionist for hard rock band Aerosmith
- Joey Krehbiel (born 1992), American MLB pitcher
- Joey L. Carr, American politician
- Joey LaCaze (1988–2013), American member of sludge metal band Eyehategod
- Joey LaLeggia (born 1992), Canadian SHL player
- Joey LaMotta (1925–2020), American boxer and boxing manager
- Joey LaRocque (born 1986), American former NFL player
- Joey Lawrence (disambiguation), several people
- Joey Lee Dillard (1924–2009), American linguist
- Joey Lelieveld, birth name of JoeySuki, Dutch music artist and DJ
- Joey Leonetti (born 1970), American former soccer player
- Joey Leung (born 1965), Hong Kong actor, director, screenwriter, playwright, program host of TV and radio, and drama tutor
- Joey Levenson, British member of shoegaze band SPC ECO
- Joey Levin, American businessman
- Joey Levine (born 1947), American singer, songwriter, and record producer of pop music
- Joey Lina (born 1951), Filipino lawyer, politician, businessman, public servant, and radio personality
- Joey Litjens (born 1990), Dutch motorcyclist
- Joey Logano (born 1990), American NASCAR driver
- Joey "The Clown" Lombardo (1929–2019), American mobster
- Joey Long (born 1970), American former MLB pitcher
- Joey Loperfido (born 1999), American MLB player
- Joey Loyzaga (born 1961), Filipino retired professional basketball player
- Joey Lucchesi (born 1993), American MLB pitcher
- Joey Lumpkin (born 1960), American former NFL player
- Joey Lussick (born 1995), Australian NRL player
- Joey Luthman (born 1997), American actor
- Joey Lynch (born 1983), American football coach
- Joey MacDonald (born 1980), Canadian former NHL goaltender
- Joey Maggs (1967–2006), American professional wrestler
- Joey Manahan (born 1971), Filipino American politician
- Joey Manley (1965–2013), American LGBT fiction author, web designer, and webcomics publisher
- Joey Mantia (born 1986), American speed- and inline speed skater, Olympic medalist, world champion, and world record holder
- Joey Marciano (born 1995), American professional baseball pitcher
- Joey Marella (1963–1994), American professional wrestling referee
- Joey Marquez (born 1957), Filipino actor, comedian, politician, and former PBA player
- Joey Martin (disambiguation), several people
- Joey Martinez (born 1975), American retired soccer player
- Joey Matenga Ashton (1907–1993), New Zealand railway worker, sportsman, and dance band leader
- Joey Mawson (born 1996), Australian racing driver
- Joey Maxim (1922–2001), American professional boxer
- Joey Maxwell (1904–1983), American NFL player and lawyer
- Joey Mazzarino (born 1968), American puppeteer, writer, director, and actor
- Joey Mazzola (born 1961), American guitarist, songwriter, music educator, and visual artist; past member of rock band Sponge (band)
- Joey Mbu (born 1993), American former NFL-, AAF-, and XFL player
- Joey McCarthy (born 1972), American professional stock car racing driver
- Joey McClellan, American member of folk rock band Midlake
- Joey McCoy, Japanese past member of city pop band Carlos Toshiki & Omega Tribe
- Joey McFarland (born 1972), American film producer
- Joey McGuire (born 1971), American football coach
- Joey McIntyre (born 1972), American actor and singer-songwriter; member of boy band New Kids on the Block
- Joey McLaughlin (born 1956), American former MLB pitcher
- Joey McLoughlin (born 1964), English former professional cyclist
- Joey McLoughney (born 1988), Irish hurler
- Joey McNicol, Australian activist against E-mail spam
- Joey Mellen (born 1939), British writer
- Joey Melo (born 1989), Canadian former MLS- and CSL player
- Joey Meneses (born 1992), Mexican MLB player, and former NPB player
- Joey Mente (1976–2018), Filipino PBA player
- Joey Mercury (born 1979), American professional wrestler
- Joey Merlino (born 1962), American mobster and crime boss
- Joey Methé, Canadian candidate in the Green Party of Canada candidates in the 2006 Canadian federal election
- Joseph Meyer (disambiguation), several people
- Joey Mickey (born 1970), American former NFL player
- Joey Miller (born 1985), American former professional stock car racing driver
- Joey Mills (born 1998), American pornographic actor
- Joey Miskulin (born 1949), American accordionist, singer, songwriter, and producer
- Joey Miyashima (born 1957), American television- and film actor
- Joey Moe (born 1985), Danish singer and producer
- Joey Moi (born 1975/1976), Canadian record producer, audio engineer, mixer, songwriter, and musician
- Joey Molland (1947–2025), English songwriter and rock guitarist; member of Welsh rock band Badfinger
- Joey Montana (born 1982), Panamanian reggaeton singer
- Joey Morgan (1993–2021), American actor
- Joey Mormina (born 1982), Canadian former AHL- and NHL player
- Joey Moss (1963–2020), Canadian NHL- and CFL dressing room attendant
- Joey Muha (born 1992), Canadian drummer; member of heavy metal band Threat Signal
- Joey Müller (born 2000), German professional footballer
- Joey Murcia, birth name of Giuseppe Andrews (born 1979), American former actor, screenwriter, director, and singer-songwriter
- Joey Murphy, American screenwriter and television producer
- Joey Murray (born 1996), American professional baseball pitcher
- Joey Murray (footballer) (born 1971), English former footballer
- Joey Nation (born 1978), American former MLB pitcher
- Joey Negro, former stage name of Dave Lee (born 1964), English DJ and house music producer
- Joey Newby (born 1982), American professional baseball pitcher
- Joey Newman (born 1976), American film composer, orchestrator, arranger, and conductor
- Joey Newton (born 1977), Australian sailor
- Joey O'Brien (born 1986), Irish retired professional footballer
- Joey Olivo (born 1958), American former professional boxer
- Joey O'Meara (1943–2001), Irish cricketer
- Joey Ortiz (born 1998), American MLB player
- Joey Osbourne, American drummer
- Joey Pal (1927–2012), Canadian NHL- and CFL player
- Joey Palmer (1859–1910), Australian cricketer
- Joey Paras (1978–2023), Filipino actor, filmmaker, singer, screenwriter, playwright, and television host
- Joey Paulino, American contestant on Top Chef: Miami
- Joey Pecoraro, American musician and record producer
- Joey Pelupessy (born 1993), Dutch professional footballer
- Joey Pendleton (born 1946), American business owner and former politician
- Joey Penner, Canadian past member of rock band The Waking Eyes
- Joey Peppersack (born 1999), American Paralympic swimmer
- Joey Phuthi (born 2005), Zimbabwean professional footballer
- Joey Pierre (born 1963), Dominican cricketer
- Joey Pollari (born 1994), American actor, musician, and director
- Joey Porter (born 1977), American football coach, and former NFL player
- Joey Porter Jr. (born 2000), American NFL player
- Joey Powers (1934–2017), American pop singer and songwriter
- Joey Purp (born 1993), American rapper
- Joey Pyle (1937–2007), English gangland boss, convicted criminal, and pioneer and promoter of unlicensed boxing
- Joey Raia, American mix engineer
- Joey Ramone (1951–2001), American vocalist and songwriter of punk rock band Ramones
- Joey Reiman (born 1953), American advertising businessman and author
- Joey Reynolds, American radio show host and disc jockey
- Joey Richter, American actor and singer
- Joey Rickard (born 1991), American former MLB player
- Joey Ring (1758–1800), English cricketer
- Joey Rive (born 1963), Puerto Rican-born American former professional tennis player
- Joey Rocketshoes Dillon, American gunslinger, Hollywood gun trainer, actor, musician, comedian, and songwriter
- Joey Roggeveen (born 1998), Dutch professional footballer
- Joey Romasanta (born 1944), Filipino sports executive and administrator
- Joey Rosskopf (born 1989), American cyclist
- Joey Roukens (born 1982), Dutch composer of contemporary classical music
- Joey Royal, Canadian Anglican bishop
- Joey Rubenstein (born 1968), American Internet entrepreneur, composer, and touring- and recording artist
- Joey Russell (born 1988), Canadian former competitive figure skater
- Joseph Ryan (disambiguation), several people
- Joey Sadler (1914–2007), New Zealand rugby union player
- Joey Sagal (born 1957), American actor and screenwriter
- Joey Salads (born 1993), American YouTube personality and prankster
- Joey Salceda (born 1961), Filipino statesman and economist
- Joey Saldana (born 1972), American sprint car racing driver
- Joey Sanchez, American member of alternative rock band Fair (band)
- Joey Sandulo (1931–2019), Canadian boxer
- Joey San Nicolas (born 1973), Northern Mariana Island mayor and lawyer
- Joey Santiago (born 1965), Filipino-American guitarist and composer
- Joey Santore (born 1982/1983), American amateur naturalist
- Joey Saputo (born 1964), Canadian businessman
- Joey Scarallo (born 1978), Australian professional racing driver
- Joey Scarbury (born 1955), American singer and songwriter
- Joey Scarpellino (born 1994), Canadian actor
- Joey Schusler (born 1990), American professional downhill mountain bike racer
- Joey Semz (1976–2007), American prolific graffiti artist
- Joey Serlin (born 1970), Canadian rock guitarist and songwriter
- Joey Shaw (born 1969), Italian celebrity photographer
- Joey Silvera (born 1951), American pornographic film director and former actor
- Joey Sim (born 1987), Singaporean former footballer
- Joey Sindelar (born 1958), American professional golfer
- Joey Singh (born 1965), Indian sport shooter
- Joey Singleton (born 1951), English former professional boxer
- Joey Skaggs (born 1945), American prankster, artist, and writer
- Joey Slackman, American football player
- Joey Sleegers (born 1994), Dutch professional footballer
- Joey Slinger (born 1943), Canadian journalist and author
- Joey Slotnick (born 1968), American actor
- Joey Slye (born 1996), American NFL player
- Joey Smallwood (1900–1991), Newfoundlander- and Canadian politician
- Joey Snyder III (born 1973), American professional golfer
- Joey Spampinato (born 1948), American multi-instrumentalist; former member of rock band NRBQ
- Joey Spina (born 1977), American former professional boxer
- Joey Stabner, Canadian Paralympic volleyball player
- Joey Stann, American musician and songwriter
- Joey Stec (born 1947), American songwriter, singer, guitarist, and producer
- Joey Stefano (1968–1994), American pornographic actor
- Joey Sternaman (1900–1988), American NFL player
- Joey Stiebing (born 1961), American former basketball coach
- Joey Strickland, American military officer
- Joey Sturgis (born 1985), American record producer, composer, and mastering- and mixing engineer
- Joey Styles (born 1971), American former professional wrestling commentator
- Joey Stylez, First Nations-Métis Canadian singer and rapper/pop artist
- Joey Suk (born 1989), Dutch professional footballer
- Joey Tafolla, American guitarist; past member of power metal band Jag Panzer
- Joey Tankard (1862–1931), Australian VFA player
- Joey Tavernese (born 1989), American soccer-, indoor-, and futsal player, and assistant coach
- Joseph Taylor (disambiguation), several people
- Joey Tempest (born 1963), Swedish vocalist and songwriter of rock band Europe (band)
- Joey ten Berge (born 1985), Dutch former darts player
- Joey Tenute (born 1983), Canadian former NHL player
- Joey Terdoslavich (born 1988), American MLB player
- Joey Terrill (born 1955), American Chicano queer visual artist
- Joey Tetarenko (born 1978), Canadian Métis former NHL player
- Joey Thieman (born 1972), American retired soccer player
- Joey Thomas (born 1980), American former NFL- and CFL player
- Joey Torres (born 1958/1959), American politician
- Joey Travolta (born 1950), American actor and filmmaker
- Joey Utsler (born 1974), American member of rap duo ICP
- Joey Valenti (born 1968), American retired USISL player
- Joey van den Berg (born 1986), Dutch professional footballer
- Joey van Zegeren (born 1990), Dutch professional basketball player
- Joey Veerman (born 1998), Dutch professional footballer
- Joey Velasco (1967–2010), Filipino religious painter and sculptor
- Joey Vento (1939–2011), American cook and restaurateur
- Joey Vera (born 1963), American bassist for metal bands Armored Saint and Fates Warning
- Joey Vickery (born 1967), Canadian former professional basketball player
- Joey D. Vieira (1944–2025), American film and television actor
- Joey Villaseñor (born 1975), American former professional mixed martial artist
- Joey Votto (born 1983), Canadian-American MLB player
- Joey Wadding, Irish Gaelic footballer
- Joey Wagman (born 1991), American-Israeli professional baseball pitcher
- Joey Walker (born 1991), Australian musician, singer, and producer
- Joey Walters (born 1954), American-born Canadian former CFL- and USFL player
- Joey Walton (born 2000), Australian rugby union player
- Joey Waronker (born 1969), American drummer and music producer
- Joey Waterhouse, English footballer
- Joey Wells (born 1965), Bahamian retired long jumper
- Joey Welz (born 1940), American musician
- Joey Wendle (born 1990), American MLB player
- Joey Wentz (born 1997), American MLB pitcher
- Joey Wiemer (born 1999), American MLB player
- Joey Wong (baseball) (born 1988), American former MLB player
- Joey Woody (born 1973), American track and field athlete
- Joey Worthen (born 1979), American former soccer player and current head coach
- Joey Wright (born 1968), American professional basketball coach and former player
- Joey Yellen (born 1999), American football player
- Joey Z, American member of alternative metal band Life of Agony
- Joey Zehr, American past member of rock band The Click Five
- Joey Zimmerman (born 1986), American actor

=== Female ===
- Joey Albert (born 1960), Filipina singer-songwriter, and lyricist
- Joey Chan (born 1988), Hong Kong former professional squash player
- Joey Cook (born 1991), American singer-songwriter
- Joey Feek (1975–2016), American country music singer and songwriter; one-half of the country music duo Joey + Rory
- Joey Heatherton (born 1944), American dancer, actress, and singer
- Joey Joleen Mataele, Tongan transgender rights activist
- Joey King (born 1999), American actress
- Joey Kirkpatrick (born 1952), American glass artist, sculptor, wire artist, and educator
- Joey Lauren Adams (born 1968), American actress and director
- Joey Leung Ka Yin (born 1976), Hong Kong contemporary gongbi artist
- Joey Lye (born 1987), Canadian softball player
- Joey Marion McCreery Lewyn, birth name of Marion Mack (1902–1989), American film actress and screenwriter
- Joey Mead King (born 1976), Filipino-Iranian television personality, fashion lifestyle host, runway coach, and model mentor/co-judge
- Joey Meng (born 1970), Hong Kong actress, model, and beauty spokesperson
- Joey Muthengi, Kenyan media personality and actress
- Joey Paccagnella (born 1981), Italian synchronized swimmer
- Joey Pang (born 1979), Chinese tattoo artist
- Joey Soloway (born 1965), American television creator, showrunner, director, writer, and comedian
- Joey Swee (born 1977), Singaporean actress, television host, and former model
- Joey Vrazel, American former volleyball player- and coach
- Joey Wat (born c. 1971), Chinese businesswoman
- Joey Wong (born 1967), Taiwanese former actress and singer
- Joey Wong (born 1990), Hong Kong singer
- Joey Yung (born 1980), Hong Kong singer and actress

== Fictional characters with the name Joey ==
- Joey Boy Thompson, in the 1965 British comedy war film Joey Boy, played by Harry H. Corbett
- Joey Branning, in the British TV soap opera EastEnders, played by David Witts
- Joey Breaker, in the 1993 American romance film Joey Breaker, played by Richard Edson
- Joey Buchanan, in the American soap opera One Life to Live, played by Ryan Morris, John Paul Learn, Chris McKenna, Nathan Fillion, Don Jeffcoat, Bruce Michael Hall, and Tom Degnan
- Joey Cavanaugh, in the American horror anthology TV series American Horror Story: 1984, played by Spencer Neville
- Joey Claire, in the video game Hiveswap
- Joey Collins, in the Australian TV soap opera Home and Away, played by Kate Bell
- Joey Crusel, in the American supernatural slasher media franchise A Nightmare on Elm Street, played by Rodney Eastman
- Joey Cusack, in the 2005 action thriller film A History of Violence, played by Viggo Mortensen
- Joey Del Marco, in the Netflix series Grand Army, played by Odessa A'zion
- Joey Dimato, in the Australian TV soap opera Neighbours, played by Steven Sammut
- Joey Donovan, in the American TV sitcom Gimme a Break!, played by Joey Lawrence
- Joey Evans, in the 1940 novel Pal Joey
- Joey Flores-Vegara, in the Philippine TV drama series Destiny Rose, played by Ken Chan (adult) and Miggs Cuaderno (young)
- Joey Gladstone, in the American TV sitcoms Full House and Fuller House, played by Dave Coulier
- Joey Gutierrez, in the American TV series Agents of S.H.I.E.L.D., played by Juan Pablo Raba
- Joey Hammen, a character in the 1980 American disaster comedy movie Airplane!
- Joey Harris, in the American TV sitcom My Two Dads, played by Greg Evigan
- Joey Henderson, in the New Zealand soap opera Shortland Street, played by Johnny Barker
- Joey Heric, in the American legal drama TV series The Practice, played by John Larroquette
- Joey Jeremiah, in the Canadian teen drama TV franchise Degrassi, played by Pat Mastroianni
- Joey Johnson, in the American TV soap opera Days of Our Lives, played by Brody and Jonas, Jadon Wells, James Lastovic, and Tanner Stine
- Joey Kiriakis, in the American TV soap opera Days of Our Lives, played by Candace Mead and Benjamin Iorio
- Joey LaRocca, in the 2006 American video game The Sopranos: Road to Respect
- Joey Lucas, in the American serial political drama TV series The West Wing, played by Marlee Matlin
- Joey Maguire, in the British comedy drama TV series Shameless, played by Will Willoughby
- Joey Maldini, in the American drama TV series Your Honor, played by Chet Hanks
- Joey Mallone, in the video game Blackwell
- Joey Monteleone, in the DC Comics universe
- Joey Musgrove, in the British TV soap opera Brookside, played by Dan Mullane
- Joey Peeps, in the American crime drama TV series The Sopranos, played by Joe Maruzzo
- Joey Pigza, in the American novels Joey Pigza Swallowed the Key and Joey Pigza Loses Control
- Joey Potter, in the American teen drama TV series Dawson's Creek, played by Katie Holmes
- Joey Quinn, in the American crime drama TV series Dexter, played by Desmond Harrington
- Joey Rainbow, in the Australian TV soap opera Home and Away, played by Alex O'Han
- Joey Rooney, in the American comedy TV series Liv and Maddie, played by Joey Bragg
- Joey Russo, in the American TV sitcom Blossom, played by Joey Lawrence
- Joey Stivic, in the American TV sitcom All in the Family
- Joey Toledo, in DC Comics
- Joey Tribbiani, in the American TV sitcom Friends, and the title role of the TV series Joey, played by Matt LeBlanc
- Joey Washington, in the 1997 American martial arts comedy film Beverly Hills Ninja, played by Chris Rock
- Joseph "Joey" Wheeler (Katsuya Jonouchi in the Japanese version), from Yu-Gi-Oh! Duel Monsters, voiced by Toshiyuki Morikawa (1998–1999), Hiroki Takahashi (2000–present) (Japanese); Wayne Grayson (English)
- Joey Zasa, in the 1990 American crime film The Godfather Part III, played by Joe Mantegna
- Joey, one of two clowns who are playthings of the titular villain in the Doctor Who story The Celestial Toymaker
- Joey, in the 1989 American independent coming-of-age comedy film She's Out of Control, played by Dana Ashbrook
- Joey, in the American adult animated sitcom Daria, voiced by Geoffrey Arend and Steven Huppert
- Joey, in the 2018 Japanese manga series Chainsaw Man
- Joey, in the French comedy animated TV series Oggy and the Cockroaches
- Joselito/Joey, in Palibhasa Lalake, played by Joey Marquez
- Joey, in the Singaporean comedy animated TV series Antiks
