= De beste singer-songwriter =

De beste singer-songwriter abbreviated as DBSSW is a franchised music contest program broadcast mainly in The Netherlands and Belgium. It may refer to:

- De beste singer-songwriter van Nederland, Netherlands (four seasons, 2012-2015)
- De beste singer-songwriter van Vlaanderen, Belgium (one season, 2013)
