= Joey Giambra =

Joey Giambra may refer to:

- Joey Giambra (boxer)
- Joey Giambra (musician)
