= Giambra =

Giambra is a surname. Notable people with the surname include:

- Joel Giambra (born 1957), American politician
- Joey Giambra (boxer) (1931–2018), American boxer
- Joey Giambra (musician) (1933–2020), American jazz musician
