= Will O'Neill (ice hockey) =

American ice hockey player (born 1988)

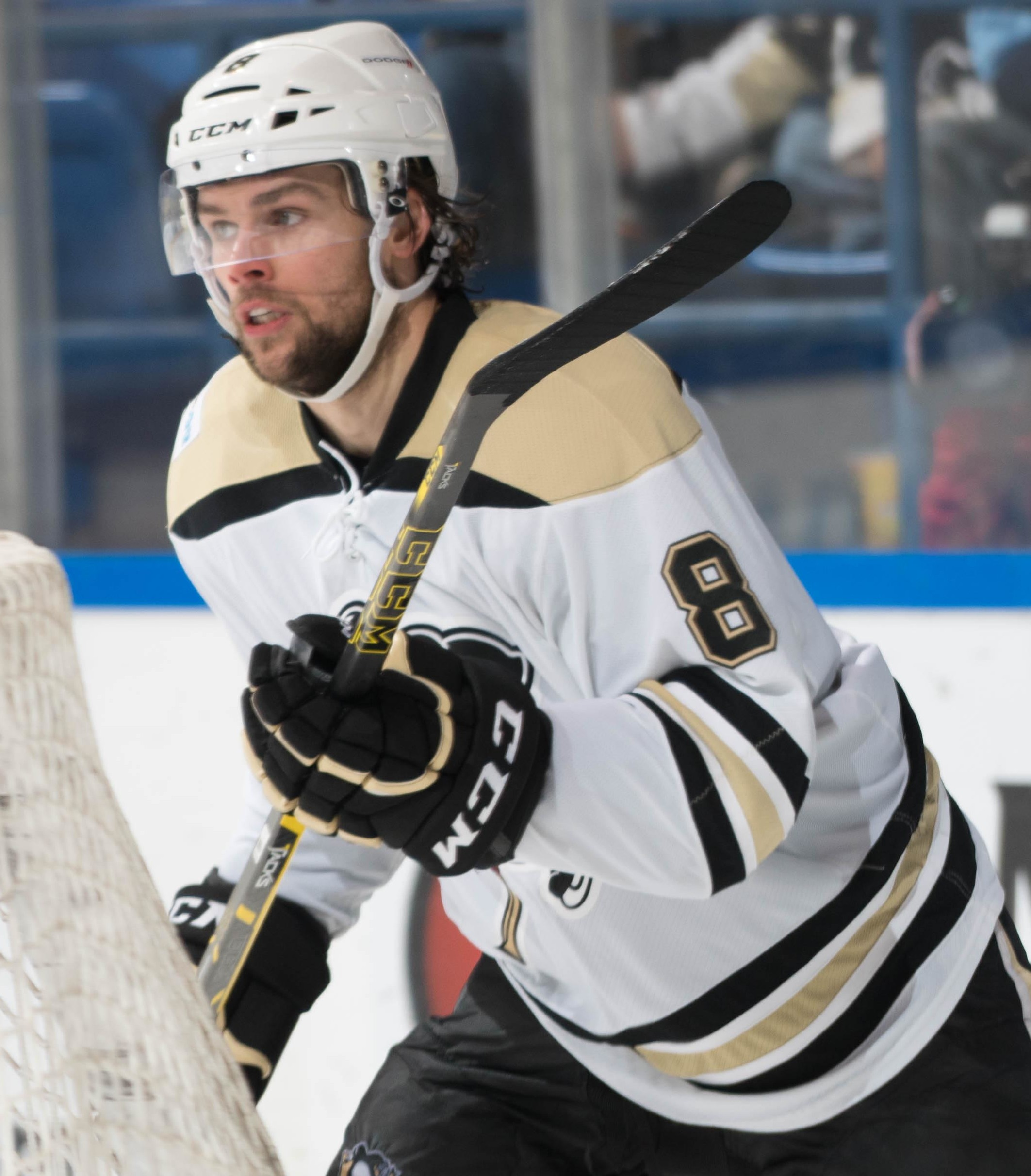
- O'Neill in 2015
- Born: April 28, 1988 (age 38) Salem, Massachusetts, U.S.
- Height: 6 ft 1 in (185 cm)
- Weight: 205 lb (93 kg; 14 st 9 lb)
- Position: Defense
- Shot: Left
- Played for: Philadelphia Flyers; EC Red Bull Salzburg
- NHL draft: 210th overall, 2006; Atlanta Thrashers
- Playing career: 2012–2019

Will O'Neill (born April 28, 1988) is an American former professional ice hockey defenseman who most recently played with EC Red Bull Salzburg in the Austrian Hockey League (EBEL). O'Neill was selected by the Atlanta Thrashers in the 7th round (210th overall) of the 2006 NHL entry draft.

== Playing career ==
As a junior, O'Neill played with the Omaha Lancers of the United States Hockey League (USHL) where he helped his team to win the Clark Cup as the 2007–08 USHL Champions. He then attended University of Maine where he played four seasons of NCAA Division I ice hockey with the Maine Black Bears, where he was recognized for his outstanding performance during his senior, 2011–12, year, when he was named the New England Division I All-Star team by the New England Hockey Writers.

On March 26, 2012, the Winnipeg Jets of the National Hockey League (NHL) signed O'Neill to a three-year, entry-level contract. On July 2, 2015, O'Neill left the Jets as a free agent and signed a one-year, two-way contract with the Pittsburgh Penguins.

On July 1, 2016, O'Neill signed a two-year, two-way contract as a free agent with the Philadelphia Flyers. In the 2016–17 season, O'Neill spent the entirety of the year with AHL affiliate, the Lehigh Valley Phantoms, recording 28 assists and 31 points in 57 games.

During his second year under contract with the Flyers in the 2017–18 season, O'Neill was recalled from the Phantoms and belatedly made his NHL debut against the St. Louis Blues at the Scottrade Center on November 2, 2017. He was returned to Lehigh following the game, finishing the season in the AHL with 19 points in 59 games.

As a free agent from the Flyers, O'Neill opted to return on a one-year AHL contract to his former club, the Wilkes-Barre/Scranton Penguins, on July 9, 2018. In the following 2018–19 season, O'Neill was unable to recapture his previous success in Wilkes/Barre/Scranton, limited to 8 assists in 28 games from the blueline before opting to be released from his contract with the club on January 25, 2019.

O'Neill decided to continue his career abroad, promptly agreeing to his first European contract in signing for the remainder of the season with Austrian club EC Red Bull Salzburg of the EBEL, on January 29, 2019.

== Career statistics ==
			Regular season					Playoffs
Season	Team	League	GP	G	A	Pts	PIM	GP	G	A	Pts	PIM
2004–05	St. John's Preparatory School	HS Prep
2005–06	Tabor Academy	HS Prep		5	25	30		—	—	—	—	—
2006–07	Omaha Lancers	USHL	57	4	9	13	73	5	0	0	0	8
2007–08	Omaha Lancers	USHL	58	5	19	24	95	14	1	6	7	38
2008–09	University of Maine	HE	34	4	12	16	82	—	—	—	—	—
2009–10	University of Maine	HE	39	8	23	31	69	—	—	—	—	—
2010–11	University of Maine	HE	28	4	17	21	44	—	—	—	—	—
2011–12	University of Maine	HE	40	3	30	33	68	—	—	—	—	—
2011–12	St. John's IceCaps	AHL	7	1	2	3	9	—	—	—	—	—
2012–13	St. John's IceCaps	AHL	59	3	18	21	32	—	—	—	—	—
2013–14	St. John's IceCaps	AHL	68	9	26	35	80	18	3	13	16	27
2014–15	St. John's IceCaps	AHL	72	10	38	48	74	—	—	—	—	—
2015–16	Wilkes–Barre/Scranton Penguins	AHL	74	8	42	50	78	9	1	3	4	12
2016–17	Lehigh Valley Phantoms	AHL	57	3	28	31	44	—	—	—	—	—
2017–18	Lehigh Valley Phantoms	AHL	59	6	13	19	14	—	—	—	—	—
2017–18	Philadelphia Flyers	NHL	1	0	0	0	0	—	—	—	—	—
2018–19	Wilkes–Barre/Scranton Penguins	AHL	28	0	8	8	49	—	—	—	—	—
2018–19	EC Red Bull Salzburg	AUT	12	1	1	2	18	13	2	4	6	10
AHL totals			424	40	175	215	380	27	4	16	20	39
NHL totals			1	0	0	0	0	—	—	—	—	—

== Awards and honors ==
Award	Year
USHL
Clark Cup (Omaha Lancers)	2007–08
College
Hockey East All-Academic Team	2009–10
Hockey East All-Tournament Team	2010, 2012
All-New England First-Team	2011–12
AHL
Second All-Star Team	2016

== See also ==
- List of players who played only one game in the NHL
