= Joey Shaw =

Italian celebrity photographer

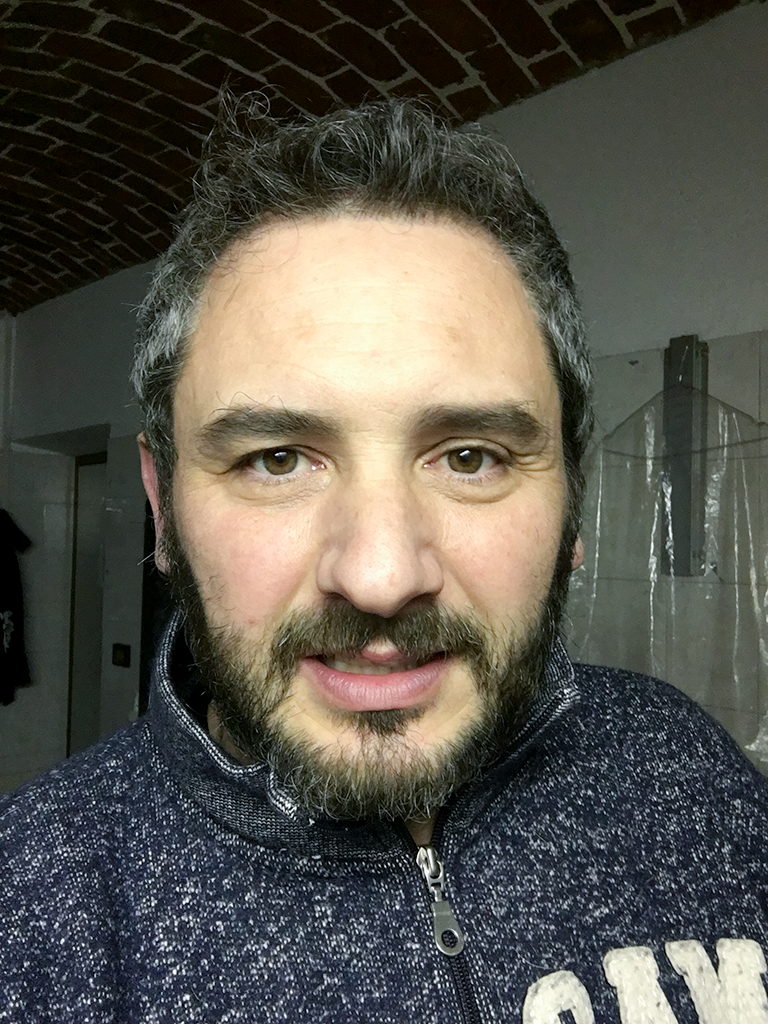
- Born: 22 August 1969 (age 56); Milan, Italy
- Occupation: celebrity photographer
- Website: www.joeyshaw.com

Joey Shaw (born 22 August 1969, in Milan, Italy) is an Italian celebrity photographer. Shaw is known for his work in the fashion industry and celebrity photography with his covers and features for H magazine. He is the author of the photographic book Shades of Glamour and the dedicated Noura Hussein campaign published by Editoriale Italiano.

== Career ==
Joey Shaw got his start in the fashion industry shooting models in Milan in the 1990s. After gaining notice in the Milan and Paris fashion scene, he shot his first campaign for Vogue magazine and the fashion shows for Vogue Italy and Style magazine.

Beginning in 1994, Shaw often traveled to Los Angeles to shooting actresses and actors and continue fashion editorials with Hollywood stars including Debby Ryan, Anna Camp, Adam Rodriguez, Sarah Hyland, Lori Loughlin, Lisa Edelstein, Tobin Bell, Ernie Hudson, Deborah Ann Woll, Isabelle Fuhrman, Jessica Lowndes, Kathleen Robertson, Taylor Spreitler, and Ross McCall.

Shaw photographed 2 calendars; a glamour one shot in Lanzarote, Canary Islands in 2005 with playmate Zsuzsanna Ripli and a fashion one in Milan in 2007, both for Next magazine.

Shaw did campaigns for Vodafone, Emirates, The North Face, Expedia, Hilton Hotels & Resorts, Société Générale, Mastercard, and Banca Etruria. In May 2015 the Shaw introduced the XS campaign,

In July 2015, Shaw launched the "1+1= couple" campaign for H.

In December 2015, Shaw photographed Deborah Ann Woll for Exit magazine. The magazine also interviewed Shaw.

In January 2016 an international XS campaign was released in London and Shaw is the author of the photos for the new campaign.

In May 2017, Editoriale Italiano released an interview with Shaw.

In October 2017, Photos magazine in the UK published an interview with Shaw.

In May 2018, Kate magazine had a cover shot by Joey Shaw

On 26 June Shaw dedicated the new Editoriale Italiano campaign to Noura Hussein.

== Books ==
- The true story of a fashion photographer ISBN 9788890248214 (2007)
- Shades of Glamour ISBN 9788890248238 (2009)
