= Parker Milner =

American ice hockey player (born 1990)

- Born: September 6, 1990 (age 35) Pittsburgh, Pennsylvania, U.S.
- Height: 6 ft 1 in (185 cm)
- Weight: 197 lb (89 kg; 14 st 1 lb)
- Position: Goaltender
- Catches: Left
- NHL team Former teams: Washington Capitals; Bridgeport Sound Tigers; Iowa Wild; Hershey Bears
- NHL draft: Undrafted
- Playing career: 2013–present

Parker Milner (born September 6, 1990) is an American professional ice hockey goaltender, currently with the Washington Capitals of the National Hockey League (NHL). Milner had a standout collegiate career with Boston College, winning the NCAA Frozen Four and 2012 NCAA Division I Men's Ice Hockey Tournament finals in Tampa, Florida. Boston College coach Jerry York, listed him among elite Boston College goaltenders Scott Clemmensen, Cory Schneider and John Muse.

== Playing career ==
=== Amateur ===
Milner first played with the Waterloo Blackhawks in the United States Hockey League. He was the Blackhawks Most Improved Player in the 2008–09 season.

As a junior, playing collegiate hockey with Boston College in the Hockey East, Milner overcame a midseason slump to help his team win the Beanpot trophy. He had a 25–5 record and a .931 save percentage during the regular season. Milner helped lead his team to a 19-game winning streak including championships at the Beanpot tournament and the 2011-12 National Championship final.

He was named to the 2012 Hockey East Men's Ice Hockey Tournament all tournament team. He was named defensive player of the week February 20, 2012. Milner was also named to the 2011 Ice Breaker All-Tournament Team after Boston College won its third Ice Breaker title by defeating North Dakota 6–2 in Grand Forks, North Dakota.

=== Professional ===
Undrafted, on June 30, 2013, Milner signed a one-year American Hockey League contract with the Bridgeport Sound Tigers, an affiliate of the New York Islanders. He started the season with the Sound Tigers but was later reassigned to the Stockton Thunder, the Islanders' ECHL affiliate.

On August 19, 2014, Milner signed as a free agent to a one-year contract with the Quad City Mallards of the ECHL.

On July 2, 2015, Milner returned to the Sound Tigers of the AHL, agreeing to a one-year contract as a free agent.

As a free agent the following season, Milner joined his third AHL club, in agreeing to a one-year contract with the Hershey Bears on July 7, 2016.

During the 2018–19 season, his third season within the Washington Capitals system, with AHL contracts, Milner was signed to his first NHL contract, agreeing to a one year, two-way deal for the remainder of the season with the parent club. Signed to add an organizational depth in preparation for the playoffs, he was assigned to continue playing in the ECHL with the Stingrays, the ECHL club in the Capitals system.

Having provided the additional depth to the Capitals, Milner continued within the organization in agreeing to a one-year AHL contract with the Bears on May 28, 2019.

After seven professional seasons, Milner opted to retire from professional hockey following the 2019–20 season. Milner remains connected with the Stingrays as the local emergency backup goaltender. In his role during the 2020-21 season, Milner suited up four times but did not play as he was not entitled to play under league regulations (only allowed in case of injury or if no goaltender is available because of call ups or other situations). He was on the Stingrays roster for three games—March 14 and 26 versus the Orlando Solar Bears and March 31 against the Greenville Swamp Rabbits. He also was on the roster for Orlando in their April 14 at the Stingrays

== Personal ==
Milner is from Pittsburgh, Pennsylvania. During the 2010 offseason, Milner and two other Freshman hockey players (Philip Samulesson and Patrick Wey) were involved in an accident when the SUV they were passengers in was hit by a trolley close to the South Street T-stop near Boston College. Players were treated for minor injuries.

Milner has also become an occasional writer for Vox Media's Eater, often writing both regarding the Charleston area and on road games to local restaurants relative to the venue of the game.

As of August 20, 2025, Milner is the Food Editor of The Post and Courier. He joined The Post and Courier after leading the Charleston City Paper's food section.

== Career statistics ==
			Regular season									Playoffs
Season	Team	League	GP	W	L	T/OT	MIN	GA	SO	GAA	SV%	GP	W	L	MIN	GA	SO	GAA	SV%
2008–09	Waterloo Black Hawks	USHL	31	20	7	1	1758	85	3	2.90	.902	2	0	1	105	7	0	3.99	.860
2009–10	Boston College	HE	14	10	2	1	801	31	0	2.32	.909	—	—	—	—	—	—	—	—
2010–11	Boston College	HE	8	3	2	0	380	17	1	2.68	.899	—	—	—	—	—	—	—	—
2011–12	Boston College	HE	34	29	5	0	2055	57	3	1.66	.937	—	—	—	—	—	—	—	—
2012–13	Boston College	HE	37	22	11	4	2212	98	2	2.66	.911	—	—	—	—	—	—	—	—
2013–14	Stockton Thunder	ECHL	25	9	14	2	1478	70	2	2.84	.907	—	—	—	—	—	—	—	—
2013–14	Bridgeport Sound Tigers	AHL	8	4	2	0	387	19	0	2.95	.904	—	—	—	—	—	—	—	—
2014–15	Quad City Mallards	ECHL	43	24	14	3	2497	95	2	2.28	.920	4	0	3	222	7	0	1.89	.926
2014–15	Iowa Wild	AHL	1	0	0	0	12	2	0	10.43	.778	—	—	—	—	—	—	—	—
2015–16	Missouri Mavericks	ECHL	26	17	7	1	1549	56	3	2.17	.925	3	2	1	179	7	0	2.35	.920
2015–16	Bridgeport Sound Tigers	AHL	6	2	3	0	276	14	0	3.05	.906	—	—	—	—	—	—	—	—
2016–17	South Carolina Stingrays	ECHL	43	26	14	2	2520	114	1	2.72	.900	22	12	10	1409	54	3	2.30	.919
2016–17	Hershey Bears	AHL	5	3	2	0	232	11	0	2.84	.913	—	—	—	—	—	—	—	—
2017–18	Hershey Bears	AHL	6	1	4	1	362	23	0	3.81	.865	—	—	—	—	—	—	—	—
2017–18	South Carolina Stingrays	ECHL	38	28	7	3	2191	68	3	1.86	.929	4	0	4	273	7	0	1.54	.926
2018–19	South Carolina Stingrays	ECHL	40	19	17	3	2342	115	1	2.95	.912	5	1	4	329	15	1	2.74	.914
2018–19	Hershey Bears	AHL	3	2	1	0	184	7	0	2.28	.931	—	—	—	—	—	—	—	—
2019–20	South Carolina Stingrays	ECHL	30	20	6	3	1772	65	7	2.20	.923	—	—	—	—	—	—	—	—
2019–20	Hershey Bears	AHL	1	1	0	0	60	0	1	0.00	1.000	—	—	—	—	—	—	—	—
2022	Team Trottier	3ICE	17	10	7	—	272	59	—	3.47	0.774	—	—	—	—	—	—	—	—
2023	Team Mullen	3ICE	6	3	3	—	96	24	—	4.00	0.753	—	—	—	—	—	—	—	—
AHL totals			30	13	12	1	1,513	76	1	3.02	.902	—	—	—	—	—	—	—	—

== Awards and honors ==
Award	Year
College
Hockey East All-Tournament Team	2012
NCAA All-Tournament Team	2012
ECHL
Goaltender of the Year	2017–18
All-ECHL First Team	2017–18
All-ECHL Second Team	2019–20
3ICE
Patrick Cup Champion	2022
Guy Carbonneau Playoff MVP Award	2022

Awards and achievements
Preceded by J. T. Brown	NCAA Tournament Most Outstanding Player; 2012	Succeeded by Andrew Miller
Preceded by John Muse	Hockey East Goaltending Champion; 2011–12	Succeeded by Connor Hellebuyck
