= Joseph Lawrence =

Joseph Lawrence may refer to:

- Joseph Lawrence (Pennsylvania politician) (1786–1842), US Congressman
- Joseph Lawrence (British politician) (1848–1919), British MP
- Joseph Lawrence, inventor of Listerine
- Joe Lawrence (born 1977), baseball player

== See also ==
- Joey Lawrence (disambiguation)
