= Alex Chiasson =

Canadian ice hockey player (born 1990)

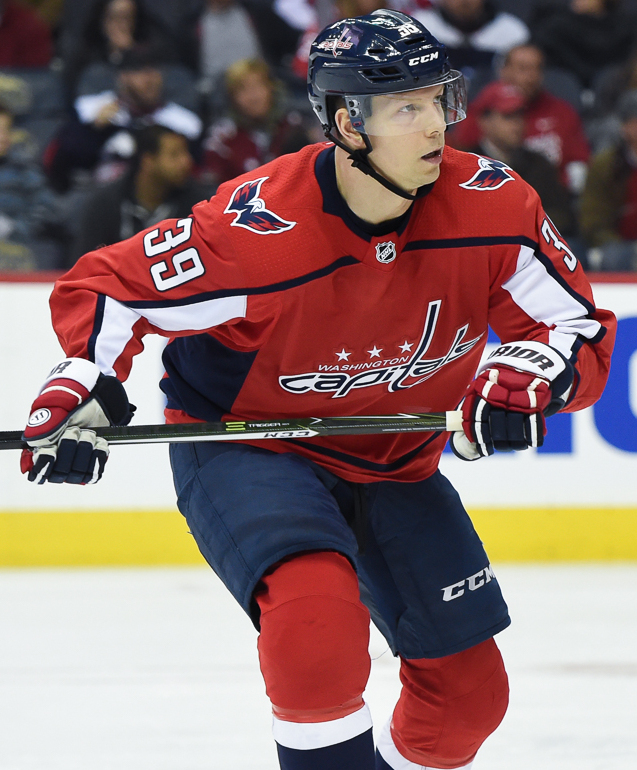
- Chiasson with the Washington Capitals in 2018
- Born: October 1, 1990 (age 35) Montreal, Quebec, Canada
- Height: 6 ft 4 in (193 cm)
- Weight: 200 lb (91 kg; 14 st 4 lb)
- Position: Right wing
- Shot: Right
- Played for: Dallas Stars; Ottawa Senators; Calgary Flames; Washington Capitals; Edmonton Oilers; Vancouver Canucks; Detroit Red Wings
- NHL draft: 38th overall, 2009; Dallas Stars
- Playing career: 2012–2023

Alex Chiasson (/ˈtʃeɪsɔːn/ CHAY-sawn, French pronunciation: [alɛks ʃjasɔ̃], born October 1, 1990) is a Canadian former professional ice hockey player. A forward, he played in the National Hockey League (NHL) for the Dallas Stars, Ottawa Senators, Calgary Flames, Washington Capitals, Edmonton Oilers, Vancouver Canucks and Detroit Red Wings. Chiasson won the Stanley Cup as a member of the Capitals in 2018.

== Playing career ==
=== Early life ===
Born in Montreal, Quebec, and raised in Saint-Augustin-de-Desmaures, Chiasson grew up cheering for the Montreal Canadiens of the National Hockey League (NHL). He began skating at age 4 after his sister suggested that he start. He played in the 2003 and 2004 Quebec International Pee-Wee Hockey Tournaments with a minor ice hockey team from Rive-Nord, Montreal.

After his sophomore year of high school, he left Quebec to study at Northwood School in Lake Placid, New York. Although Chiasson did not speak English until he moved to the United States (famously knowing only the words "yes", "no", and "toaster", hence his nickname of "Toaster"), he has since become fluent.

=== Amateur ===
Chiasson played for the Des Moines Buccaneers of the United States Hockey League (USHL) for the 2008–09 season. While in Des Moines he was coached by J. P. Parisé. That year he led the team in scoring, with 17 goals, 33 assists for 50 points in 56 games. He was selected for the 2009 USHL All-Star Game.

==== Boston University ====
In 2009 Chiasson enrolled at Boston University (BU) of the Hockey East conference, then the defending NCAA Division I Ice Hockey National Champions. He has remarked that he enjoyed playing for BU in part due to the close knit nature of the team. In his first season at BU in 2009–10, he missed several games due to a concussion, scoring seven goals and 19 points in 35 games. During the 2010 off season Chiasson worked out with Patrice Bergeron in Quebec. He was successful in the 2010–11 season, and led his team in scoring, with 14 goals and 34 points in 35 games. His teammates nicknamed him "chaser". In his third and final season with BU in 2011–12, he appeared in 38 games, marking 15 goals and 46 points. He was named to the Hockey East All-Tournament Team in 2012 after BU were eliminated in the semi-finals of the Hockey East conference tournament.

=== Professional ===
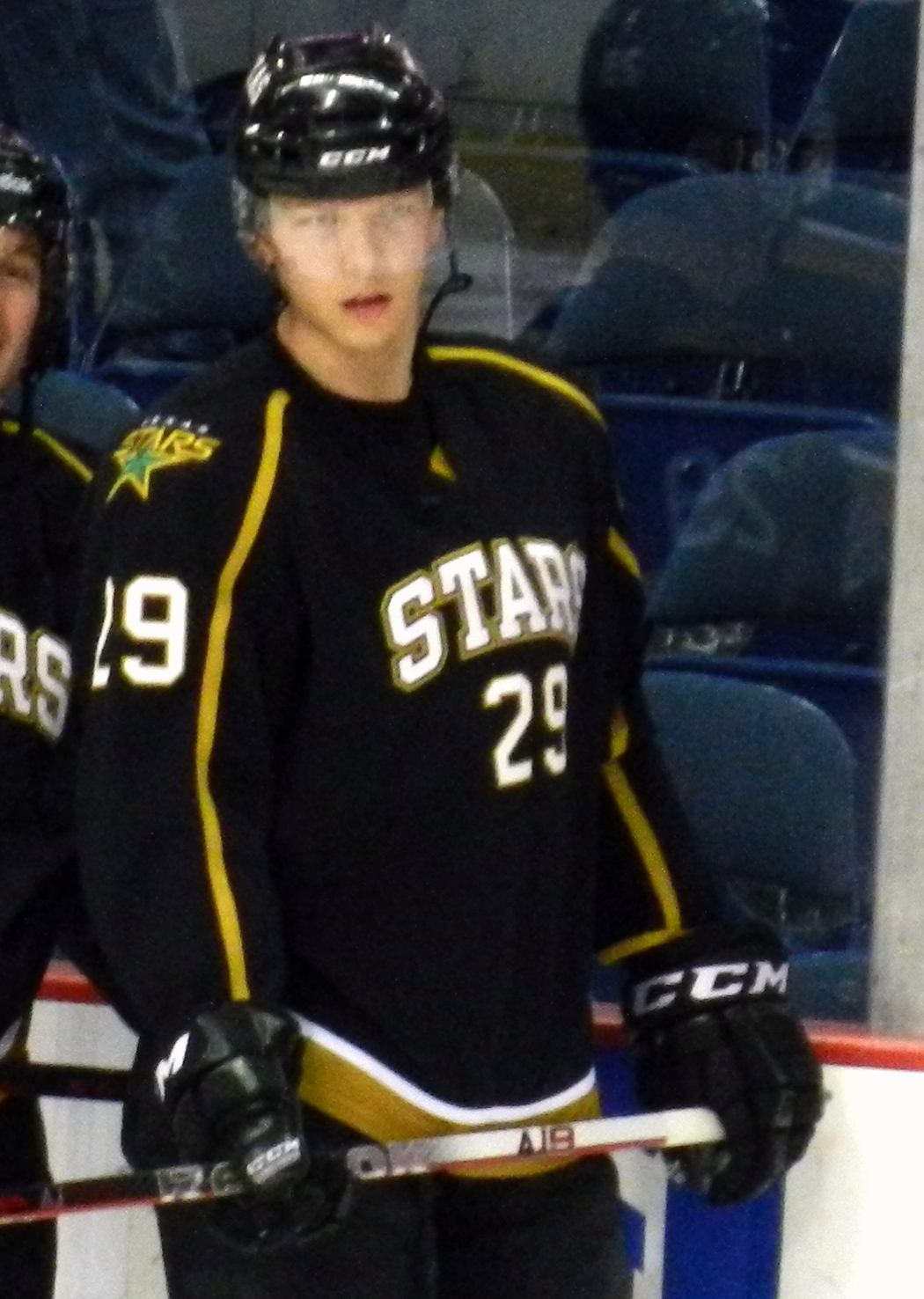
Chiasson with the Texas Stars in 2013

==== Dallas Stars ====
Chiasson was selected by the Dallas Stars in the second round, 38th overall, of the 2009 NHL entry draft. On March 26, 2012, Chiasson signed a three-year contract with the Dallas Stars organization. He was assigned to their American Hockey League (AHL) affiliate, the Texas Stars, where he finished the rest of the season playing in nine games, scoring one goal and five points. Due to the 2012 NHL lockout, Chiasson returned to Texas for the beginning of the 2012–13 season. He appeared in 57 games with Texas, scoring 13 goals and 35 points. Chiasson was recalled from Texas and made his NHL debut on April 3, 2013, against the Anaheim Ducks. In his second career game Chiasson scored his first NHL goal on April 5 against Viktor Fasth of the Ducks. Playing on the first line along with Jamie Benn and Ray Whitney, Chiasson scored six goals in his first six games. He returned to the AHL for the 2013 Calder Cup playoffs and made seven appearances for Texas, scoring one goal and three points.

In 2013–14, his first full season with the Stars, he marked his first three-point game on October 24, scoring two goals and adding an assist in a 5–1 victory over the Calgary Flames. Chiasson finished tied for fourth in regular season team scoring, registering 13 goals and 35 points in 79 games. The Stars made the 2014 Stanley Cup playoffs and faced the Anaheim Ducks in the first round. Chiasson made his playoff debut in Game 1 of the best-of-seven series on April 16, 2014. He registered his first playoff point assisting on Jaime Benn's second period goal in the 4–3 loss. He recorded his first playoff goal in Dallas' game 2, 3–2 loss on April 19. He opened the scoring in the first period with the Stars on the power play, taking a pass from Benn to beat Frederik Andersen. However, the Stars were eliminated by the Ducks in six games, with Chiasson marking the one goal and assist for two points in the series.

==== Ottawa Senators ====
Chiasson was involved in a blockbuster trade on July 1, 2014, being dealt to the Ottawa Senators along with Alex Guptill, Nick Paul, and a second round pick in the 2015 NHL entry draft in exchange for star forward Jason Spezza, and Ludwig Karlsson. He scored a goal in his first game with the Senators on October 9. He finished the regular season with 11 goals and 26 points in 76 games with the Senators. Ottawa made the 2015 Stanley Cup playoffs and faced the Montreal Canadiens in the first round. The Senators were eliminated in four games and Chiasson was held scoreless in the four games.

Following the 2014–15 NHL season Chiasson became a restricted free agent under the NHL Collective Bargaining Agreement. The Senators made him a qualifying offer to retain his NHL rights and, on July 5, 2015, Chiasson filed for salary arbitration. Chiasson was seeking $2.4 million per year, while the Senators offered $1 million. The arbitrator awarded Chiasson a one-year contract of $1.2 million. In his second year with the Senators, Chiasson's scoring declined, recording only seven goals and 15 points in 77 games.

==== Calgary Flames ====
Following the 2015–16 season, Ottawa and Chiasson again clashed over a new contract, unable to agree to a dollar value. The Senators traded Chiasson to the Calgary Flames in exchange for Patrick Sieloff on June 27, 2016. He was signed as a restricted free agent to a one-year $800,000 contract with the Flames. He scored his first goal for the Flames in his first game on October 12 in a 7–4 loss to the Edmonton Oilers. He recorded a three-point game on December 4, one of three players to do so in the game along with Sam Bennett and Matt Stajan, in an 8–3 win over the Anaheim Ducks. He rebounded offensively with the Flames in the 2016–17 season, providing depth scoring with 12 goals and 24 points in 81 games. The Flames faced the Ducks in the first round of the 2017 Stanley Cup playoffs but were swept in four games. Chiasson went scoreless in the series. As an arbitration eligible restricted free agent, Chiasson was not extended a qualifying offer by the deadline on June 26, 2017.

==== Washington Capitals ====
On September 9, 2017, the Washington Capitals signed Chiasson, then an unrestricted free agent, to a professional tryout (PTO). Following training camp and preseason, on October 4, the Capitals signed Chiasson to a $660,000 one-year contract. He made his Capitals debut on October 5 in the season-opening 5–4 win over his former team, the Ottawa Senators. He registered his first point with the Capitals on October 20, assisting on Jay Beagle's shorthanded goal in a 4–3 overtime win over the Detroit Red Wings. He scored his first goal for Washington on November 2 in a 4–3 win over the New York Islanders. In 61 games with Washington he registered nine goals and 18 points.

The Capitals made the 2018 Stanley Cup playoffs and faced the Columbus Blue Jackets in the first round. Chiasson went scoreless in the six game series as the Capitals eliminated the Blue Jackets. They moved on to face the Pittsburgh Penguins in the second round, where Chiasson scored his first playoff goal for Washington in the Game 6 Capitals 2–1 victory. The win eliminated the Penguins and the Capitals moved on to face the Tampa Bay Lightning in the Eastern Conference Final. In the conference final, Chiasson recorded one assist, setting up Devante Smith-Pelly's second period goal in the Capitals Game 2 6–2 victory. He was a healthy scratch for the Stanley Cup Final against the Vegas Golden Knights, whom they defeated to win the Stanley Cup. In 16 playoff games, he scored the one goal and assist for two points. Chiasson won his only Stanley Cup with the Capitals.

==== Edmonton Oilers ====
After going unsigned during the offseason, on September 10, 2018, Chiasson signed a professional try out contract with the Edmonton Oilers, and on October 2, signed a one-year contract with the Oilers. He made his Oilers debut on October 20 and in his second game on October 23, he scored his first goal with Edmonton against Matt Murray, in a two-goal effort in a 6–5 overtime loss to the Pittsburgh Penguins. With the Oilers, Chiasson set a new career high for most goals in a season, scoring his 14th on December 14, 2018, against Anthony Stolarz of the Philadelphia Flyers in a 4–1 victory. He finished the season with 22 goals and 38 points in 73 games. Coach Todd McLellan played Chiasson on the top two lines and on the first power play unit. After exceeding expectations with Oilers in his first year, Chiasson was signed to a two-year contract on July 1, 2019.

In his second season with the Oilers in 2019–20, Chiasson started slowly, only scoring three goals in the first month of the season. He finished the season with 11 goals and 24 points in 65 games before the NHL suspended the season due to the COVID-19 pandemic on March 12, 2020. When play resumed for the 2020 Stanley Cup playoffs, the Oilers faced the Chicago Blackhawks in the qualifying round. In Game 2 of the series on August 3, Chiasson assisted on Connor McDavid's first playoff hat trick goal in the second period and in the third period, scored his own goal in the Oilers only win of the series. The Blackhawks eliminated the Oilers in four games and Chiasson had the one goal and assist in the series.

In the pandemic-delayed 2020–21 season, Chiasson was suspended for one game on March 2, 2021 for a cross-checking infraction on the Toronto Maple Leafs forward Jimmy Vesey in their game on March 1. On April 26, Chiasson scored his 100th career goal in the NHL, opening the scoring in a 6–1 victory over the Winnipeg Jets. He finished the season with nine goals and 16 points in 45 games. The Oilers qualified for the 2021 Stanley Cup playoffs and faced the Jets in the first round. In Game 4, Chiasson scored a go-ahead goal in the third period on the power play, but the Jets tied the game later in the period and won the game in triple overtime, eliminating the Oilers. In three playoff games, Chiasson scored the one goal.

==== Vancouver Canucks ====
On October 12, 2021, Chiasson signed a one-year, $750,000 contract with the Vancouver Canucks after a successful try-out in training camp. He made his Canucks debut in the 2021–22 season on October 13, facing his former team, the Edmonton Oilers. In the second game of the season on October 15, he recorded his first goal for the team on the power play and an assist in a 5–4 shootout win over the Philadelphia Flyers. Chiasson played in a depth forward role with the Canucks, featuring in 67 regular season games for 13 goals and 22 points.

==== Detroit Red Wings ====
As a free agent from the Canucks, Chiasson for the second consecutive season went un-signed over the summer before accepting a PTO to attend the Arizona Coyotes training camp for the 2022–23 season. Following the Coyotes pre-season, Chiasson was unable to secure a contract and was released from his PTO on October 10, 2022. Remaining without a club for the first quarter of the season, Chiasson agreed to join the Detroit Red Wings' AHL affiliate, the Grand Rapids Griffins, on a professional tryout on November 26, 2022. Chiasson added 20 points through 29 games with the Griffins before he signed a one-year, two-way contract with the Red Wings for the remainder of the season on March 3, 2023. He made his debut on March 4 in a 4–1 loss to the New York Islanders, skating on the fourth line. On March 8, he recorded two assists for his first points with Detroit in a comeback win over the Chicago Blackhawks and scored his first goal with the Red Wings in the following game on March 11 in a 3–2 loss to the Boston Bruins. He finished the season with six goals and nine points in 20 games.

==== Boston Bruins ====
As a free agent for the third-year running, on August 21, 2023, Chiasson accepted a professional tryout invitation to attend the Boston Bruins training camp. Following participation in training camp and pre-season, Chiasson was released from his PTO with the Bruins on October 1, 2023.

=== Retirement ===
Chiasson announced his retirement from professional hockey on January 6, 2025. While not playing hockey, Chiasson enjoys golfing and attending Boston Red Sox games.

== Career statistics ==
			Regular season					Playoffs
Season	Team	League	GP	G	A	Pts	PIM	GP	G	A	Pts	PIM
2005–06	Séminaire St-François Blizzard	QMAAA	13	1	1	2	16	2	1	1	2	0
2006–07	Séminaire St-François Blizzard	QMAAA	43	12	18	30	41	18	4	18	22	18
2007–08	Northwood School	HS-Prep	45	35	46	81	26	—	—	—	—	—
2008–09	Des Moines Buccaneers	USHL	56	17	33	50	101	—	—	—	—	—
2009–10	Boston University	HE	36	7	12	19	28	—	—	—	—	—
2010–11	Boston University	HE	35	14	20	34	75	—	—	—	—	—
2011–12	Boston University	HE	38	15	31	46	67	—	—	—	—	—
2011–12	Texas Stars	AHL	9	1	4	5	9	—	—	—	—	—
2012–13	Texas Stars	AHL	57	13	22	35	43	7	2	1	3	4
2012–13	Dallas Stars	NHL	7	6	1	7	0	—	—	—	—	—
2013–14	Dallas Stars	NHL	79	13	22	35	38	6	1	1	2	2
2014–15	Ottawa Senators	NHL	76	11	15	26	67	4	0	0	0	0
2015–16	Ottawa Senators	NHL	77	8	6	14	45	—	—	—	—	—
2016–17	Calgary Flames	NHL	81	12	12	24	46	4	0	0	0	2
2017–18	Washington Capitals	NHL	61	9	9	18	26	16	1	1	2	4
2018–19	Edmonton Oilers	NHL	73	22	16	38	32	—	—	—	—	—
2019–20	Edmonton Oilers	NHL	65	11	13	24	42	4	1	1	2	0
2020–21	Edmonton Oilers	NHL	45	9	7	16	33	3	1	0	1	0
2021–22	Vancouver Canucks	NHL	67	13	9	22	24	—	—	—	—	—
2022–23	Grand Rapids Griffins	AHL	29	9	11	20	14	—	—	—	—	—
2022–23	Detroit Red Wings	NHL	20	6	3	9	6	—	—	—	—	—
NHL totals			651	120	113	233	359	37	4	3	7	8

== Awards and honours ==
Award	Year
College
Hockey East All-Tournament Team	2012
NHL
Stanley Cup champion	2018
