= Joey Murray (footballer) =

English footballer (born 1971)

Personal information
- Full name: Joseph Ernest Murray
- Date of birth: 5 November 1971 (age 54)
- Place of birth: Liverpool, England
- Position: Midfielder

Senior career*
Years	Team	Apps	(Gls)
- Marine
1990–1991	Wrexham	11	(0)
- Marine
- * Club domestic league appearances and goals

Joseph Ernest Murray (born 5 November 1971) is an English former footballer who played as a midfielder. Whilst he mostly played for non-league Marine, he made appearances in the English Football League for Wrexham in the 1990–91 season under non-contract terms.
