= Noura Hussein =

Sudanese imprisoned child bride

- Criminal charge: Murder

Noura Hussein Hammad (Arabic: نورة حسين حماد) is a Sudanese woman who was sentenced to death by hanging on 10 May 2018 for killing her husband after he raped her. Hussein's legal team was given two weeks to appeal the sentence. In June 2018, Sudan commuted her sentence to five years in prison and a restitution payment of 337,000 Sudanese pounds (US $18,700).

She was forced into marriage at age 16; the marriage was arranged when she was 15. The defendant claimed the rape occurred while she was restrained by her husband's family members immediately after her marriage. The husband's family declined opportunities to pardon Hussein or accept financial compensation in lieu of her execution. The case caused worldwide outrage.

== Protests against her sentence ==
More than a million people, as of 24 May 2018, signed a petition "Justice for Noura" against her execution. Amnesty International issued a statement, according to which Noura is a victim and the sentence "an intolerable act of cruelty". The death penalty highlights the failure of the Sudanese authorities to tackle child marriage, forced marriage and marital rape, AI said. The Office of the United Nations High Commissioner for Human Rights, UN Women, the United Nations Population Fund and the UN Office of the Special Adviser on Africa have all called for clemency while Secretary-General of the United Nations António Guterres voiced his opposition to the sentence through a spokesman. On appeal, Noura's conviction was reduced to manslaughter. Her sentence was changed to 5 years in prison and a fine.

Noura was released from prison in 2021.

In Literature: This issue was written about by Emtithal Mahmoud in her chapter 'Sharia state (of mind)' in the book 'Feminists don't wear pink and other lies' by Scarlett Curtis. She described in a poem that what Hussein did was "an act of bravery of self-defence of desperation".
