= Joey Ghazal =

- Born: Joseph Fred Ghazal; September 15, 1978 (age 47); Montreal, Quebec
- Education: Concordia University
- Occupations: Restaurateur and commercial developer
- Website: joeyghazal.com

Joey Ghazal (born September 15, 1978) is a Lebanese Canadian restaurateur and founder of Fighterbrands, Pine Tree State Trading Co and The MAINE. Ghazal has developed, owned and managed restaurant and bar concepts in Beirut, Dubai and London. He has been recognized by Caterer Magazine as Middle East Restaurateur of the Year.

== Background and education ==
Born in Montreal, Canada, and raised in Dubai, Ghazal graduated from Dubai College in 1995 as a theater and history major. He holds a bachelor's degree in political science from Concordia University in Montreal, Canada.

== Career ==
Ghazal started his career in 1998 at 18 as a busboy at La Queue de Cheval Steakhouse & Bar in Montreal. He worked his way up the ranks from waiter to assistant restaurant manager, to director of marketing for the Morentzos Restaurant Group owned by Peter Morentzos.

Ghazal spent three years living in London between 1999 and 2003 where he studied Film Production and Scriptwriting at Raindance Studios and while working for the Soho House.

After leaving MRG in 2009, Ghazal moved to Beirut, Lebanon, where he created, owned and operated four restaurants and venues: Cro Magnon Steakhouse & Bar, St. Elmo’s Seaside on Zaitunay Bay, The Angry Monkey, which was franchised to Dubai's Stereo Arcade Complex in 2013, and Brgr Co.

In 2013 Ghazal moved back to Dubai to establish Fighterbrands, an agency that develops, owns and manages restaurant and bar concepts.

In 2014 Ghazal established Pine Tree State Trading Co, a BVI company that owns the Maine Oyster Bar & Grill.

In 2017 Ghazal set up Barbary Deli & Cocktail Club, a cocktail bar at the TRYP by Wyndham Hotel in Barsha Heights.

In 2018, Ghazal was awarded Restaurateur of the Year 2018 at Caterer Middle East Awards.

In 2019, Ghazal opened the Maine Street Eatery in the Studio One Hotel, in Studio City.

In 2020, Ghazal opened the Maine Land Brasserie at the Opus ME Melia Hotel in Business Bay.

In 2021, Ghazal opened the first international outpost of the Maine in London, with the Maine Mayfair, in Hanover Square in Mayfair.

In 2022 Ghazal opened the Canary Club in JLT, a West Coast-inspired restaurant which was his first departure from the Maine brand.

In 2023, Ghazal opened the Maine Ibiza in the Salt flats of Salinas in Ibiza.

Ghazal is also the founder of the Million Oyster Project which is the region's first community-driven reef restoration project], using the Maine's discarded oyster shells to rehabilitate the natural reef system off the coast of Dubai to promote marine biodiversity and create a natural habitat for the endangered Hawksbill Turtle.

== Awards ==
Ghazal was awarded "Middle East Restaurateur of the Year for 2018" by The Caterer magazine. He is also listed in the yearly "Power 50" issue as the "4th Most Powerful Independent Restaurateur" in the Middle East.
