= Joey Gibson =

Joey Gibson may refer to:

- Joey Gibson (model) (born 1945), American female model for Playboy magazine
- Joey Gibson (political activist) (born 1983), American male political activist and founder of Patriot Prayer
