= Joey Lawrence (disambiguation) =

Joey Lawrence (born 1976) is an American actor and singer.

Joey Lawrence may also refer to:

- Joey Lawrence (album), a self-titled 1993 album by Joey Lawrence
- Joey Lawrence (photographer) (born 1989), Canadian photographer
- Joey Lawrence (born 1976), past stage name of Joey the Jerk, American Christian hip hop musician
- Joseph Lawrence (Pennsylvania politician) (1786–1842), member of the U.S. House of Representatives from Pennsylvania

== See also ==
- Joseph Lawrence (disambiguation)
