= Joey Fanfarelli =

American professor

Joey R. Fanfarelli is an American professor at Marist's School of Communication and the Arts in New York who has published studies and articles on gamification, digital badges, games, and online learning.

== Career ==
Fanfarelli holds both a PhD (2014) and a M.S. (2012) in Modeling and Simulation, as well as a B.S. (2009) in Psychology, from the University of Central Florida. From 2015-2019, he served as an Assistant Professor for the University of Central Florida before becoming an Associate Professor for Marist College in 2019. He has worked on numerous simulation and training projects for a variety of partners, including the U.S. Department of Defense, U.S. Nuclear Regulatory Commission, and NASA. Fanfarelli holds a patent on an automated system designed to simulate human judgement when comparing two digital images. Used to support simulation-based training environments, the system can also be used to help predict when a human is likely to notice a difference between two similar images

== Research ==
The focus of Fanfarelli's research has been on gamification, digital badges, games, and online learning. Some arguments associated with this research are listed as follows:

- Some of the characteristics of digital badges that are regarded as having the most advantages include (a) offering more accurate and precise data regarding a person’s skills and abilities; (b) outlining information in a way that lends itself to greater simplicity and clarity; (c) aiding the development of personalized learning pathways; and (d) improving user or learner motivation.
- Some of the issues associated with digital badges that are deemed worthy of concern or in need of improvement include (a) considerations regarding student or user privacy, (b) a lack of political support structures and external recognition (sometimes referred to as the “chicken-and-egg” problem); (c) concerns that badges may serve as a threat to intrinsic motivation; and (d) what some may perceive as the “commercialism” effect of digital badging in environments where this may be regarded as unwanted or unethical.
- Digital badging systems should be designed differently in consideration of the context in which they are used. Such contexts may include education and training, gaming (e.g., video games), mobile applications, or the military.
- There are three general subsystems of any digital badging system that you will want to evaluate and test prior to release: (a) the showcasing system; (b) the issuing system; and (c) the notification system.
- We may be able to gain valuable clues into the future of digital badging by relying on the theories of recurrence and recombination. These theories suggest novel technologies develop in a way that often follows the same path as similar, historical technologies (recurrence), and that new technologies can often be developed as a side product of combining other, sometimes unrelated technologies (recombination).

== Publications ==
- Fanfarelli, J.R. (In Press). An educational critique of Blizzard’s Overwatch. In Hubbell, G. (Ed.) Essays on Games Criticism.
- Fanfarelli, J.R. & McDaniel, R. (2019). Designing Effect Digital Badges: Applications for Learning. Routledge.
- Fanfarelli, J.R. (2019). Impact of narrative and badging on learning and engagement in a psychology learning game. British Journal of Educational Technology. https://onlinelibrary.wiley.com/doi/abs/10.1111/bjet.12838
- Fanfarelli, J.R. (2018). Designing digital badges to improve learning in virtual worlds. Journal of Virtual Worlds Research, 11(3), https://doi.org/10.4101/jvwr.v11i3.7323
- Fanfarelli, J.R. (2018). Games and dementia: Evidence needed. In Ferguson, C. (Ed.) Video Game Influences on Aggression, Cognition, and Attention, 163-171.
- Fanfarelli, J.R. & McDaniel, R. (2017). Exploring digital badges in university courses: Relationships between quantity, engagement, and performance. Online Learning Journal. https://olj.onlinelearningconsortium.org/index.php/olj/article/view/1007
- McDaniel, R. & Fanfarelli, J.R. (2016) Building better digital badges: Pairing completion logic with psychological factors. Simulation & Gaming, 47(1), 73-102

== Creative works ==
- Fanfarelli, J.R. (2014, PC and Mac). Medulla. (Video Game)
