= De beste singer-songwriter van Nederland =

- Country of origin: Netherlands
- No. of seasons: 4

Original release
- Network: VARA; BNN
- Release: 25 June 2012 – May 2015

De beste singer-songwriter van Nederland (meaning The best singer-songwriter of the Netherlands), was a launching pioneer programme of the series De beste singer-songwriter abbreviated as DBSSW. It was a music contest program in Dutch broadcast on Dutch television channel VARA and BNN, in cooperation with radio station 3FM, where DJ and broadcaster Giel Beelen hosts the search for best Dutch singer-songwriter talents. The jury included Giel Beelen, Frans "Spike" van Zoest, Vince van Reeken, Jacqueline Govaert (Krezip), Eric Corton, Gerard Ekdom and Sanne Hans (member of Miss Montreal). The series was launched on 25 June 2012. The contestants would be tested in their singing and songwriting abilities in various music genres and their ability to work as duos and in bands.

Four Dutch seasons were organized (2012 to 2015). Giel Beelen announced its discontinuation on 7 March 2016.

A spinoff DBSSW programme was launched in Belgium as De beste singer-songwriter van Vlaanderen in 2013, but was discontinued after one season.

== Summary ==
Season #	From	To	Host	Winner
1	25 June 2012	August 2012	Giel Beelen	Douwe Bob
2	20 May 2013	22 July 2013	Giel Beelen	Michael Prins
3	26 May 2014	21 July 2014	Giel Beelen	Stef Classens
4	16 March 2015	May 2015	Giel Beelen	Anna Rune

== See also ==
- De beste singer-songwriter van Vlaanderen
- De beste zangers van Nederland
