= 2012 Hockey East men's ice hockey tournament =

2012 Hockey East Men's ice hockey tournament
- Dates: March 8–17, 2012
- Teams: 8
- Finals site: TD Garden; Boston
- Champions: Boston College (11th title)
- Winning coach: Jerry York (9th title)
- MVP: John Gaudreau (BC)
- Hockey East Men's Ice Hockey Tournaments

The 2012 Hockey East Men's Ice Hockey Tournament was the 28th tournament in the history of the conference. It was played between March 8 and March 17, 2012 at campus locations and at the TD Garden in Boston, Massachusetts. The Boston College Eagles won their eleventh Hockey East Tournament and earned the Hockey East's automatic bid into the 2012 NCAA Division I Men's Ice Hockey Tournament.

== Format ==
The tournament featured three rounds of play. The teams that finish below eighth in the conference are not eligible for tournament play. In the first round, the first and eighth seeds, the second and seventh seeds, the third seed and sixth seeds, and the fourth seed and fifth seeds played a best-of-three with the winner advancing to the semifinals. In the semifinals, the highest and lowest seeds and second highest and second lowest seeds play a single-elimination game, with the winner advancing to the championship game. The tournament champion receives an automatic bid to the 2012 NCAA Division I Men's Ice Hockey Tournament.

== Regular season standings ==
Note: GP = Games played; W = Wins; L = Losses; T = Ties; PTS = Points; GF = Goals For; GA = Goals Against

2011–12 Hockey East standings
	Conference							Overall					
	GP	W	L	T	PTS	GF	GA	GP	W	L	T	GF	GA
#1 Boston College†*	27	19	7	1	39	96	60	44	33	10	1	157	89
#11 Boston University	27	17	9	1	35	101	70	39	23	15	1	139	112
#9 Massachusetts–Lowell	27	17	9	1	35	90	68	38	24	13	1	126	94
#13 Maine	27	15	10	2	32	91	80	40	23	14	3	133	114
#17 Merrimack	27	13	9	5	31	70	65	37	18	12	7	102	83
New Hampshire	27	11	14	2	24	68	74	37	15	19	3	108	110
Providence	27	10	14	3	23	68	89	38	14	20	4	94	122
Massachusetts	27	9	14	4	22	83	92	36	13	18	5	114	118
Northeastern	27	9	14	4	22	73	82	34	13	16	5	97	101
Vermont	27	3	23	1	7	54	114	34	6	27	1	73	140
Championship: Boston College 4, Maine 1 † indicates conference regular season champion; * indicates conference tournament champion Rankings: USCHO.com Top 20 Poll

== Bracket ==
Quarterfinals; March 10–13
1	Boston College	2	3	—
8	Massachusetts	1	2	—
2	Massachusetts-Lowell	3	3*	0
7	Providence	5	2	1
(Pairings are reseeded after the first round)
3	Boston University	2	4	5**
6	New Hampshire	3**	2	4
4	Maine	2	2	2
5	Merrimack	1	5	1

Semifinals; March 18
1	Boston College	4
7	Providence	2
3	Boston University	3
4	Maine	5

Championship; March 19
1	Boston College	4
4	Maine	1

Note: * denotes overtime periods

=== Quarterfinals ===
==== (1) Boston College vs. (8) Massachusetts ====
March 9	Boston College	2–1	Massachusetts	Conte Forum	Recap
No scoring		First period	No scoring
Pat Mullane (7) – 17:46; Tommy Cross (5) – 18:25		Second period	No scoring
No scoring		Third period	Steven Guzzo (10) – 06:55
Parker Milner – ( 24 saves / 25 shots )		Goalie stats	Kevin Boyle – ( 14 saves / 16 shots )

March 10	Boston College	3–2	Massachusetts	Conte Forum	Recap
Pat Mullane (8) – 04:25; Paul Carey (14) – pp – 08:18		First period	Conor Sheary (12) – 02:54
Brian Dumoulin (6) – 19:11		Second period	Joel Hanley (7) – pp – 18:03
No scoring		Third period	No scoring
Parker Milner – ( 31 saves / 33 shots )		Goalie stats	Kevin Boyle – ( 16 saves / 19 shots )

Boston College Wins Series 2–0

==== (2) Massachusetts-Lowell vs. (7) Providence ====
March 8	Massachusetts-Lowell	3–5	Providence	Tsongas Arena	Recap
Josh Holmstrom (11) – 09:59		First period	No scoring
Scott Wilson (16) – pp – 12:03		Second period	Derek Army (9) – pp – 05:28; Andy Balysky (7) – 09:38; Derek Army (10) – 17:27
Matt Ferreira (12) – 15:31		Third period	Matt Bergland (6) – 11:30; Matt Bergland (7) – en – 18:25
Doug Carr – ( 32 saves / 36 shots )		Goalie stats	Alex Beaudry – ( 31 saves / 33 shots )

March 9	Massachusetts-Lowell	3–2	ot	Providence	Tsongas Arena	Recap
Chad Ruhwedel (6) – 17:28		First period		No scoring
Matt Ferreira (13) – pp – 00:52		Second period		Myles Harvey (7) – 13:43; Stefan Demopoulos (8) – 15:39
No scoring		Third period		No scoring
Zack Kamrass (1) – 11:29		Overtime		No scoring
Doug Carr – ( 32 saves / 34 shots )		Goalie stats		Alex Beaudry – ( 30 saves / 33 shots )

March 11	Massachusetts-Lowell	0–1	Providence	Tsongas Arena	Recap
No scoring		First period	Ross Mauermann (10) – 07:00
No scoring		Second period	No scoring
No scoring		Third period	No scoring
Doug Carr – ( 34 saves / 35 shots )		Goalie stats	Alex Beaudry – ( 29 saves / 29 shots )

Providence Wins Series 2–1

==== (3) Boston University vs. (6) New Hampshire ====
March 9	Boston University	2–3	2ot	New Hampshire	Agganis Arena	Recap
Alex Chiasson (13) – 14:39		First period		Nick Sorkin (9) – 17:20; Kevin Goumas (9) – 18:06
Kevin Gilroy (2) – 16:50		Second period		No scoring
No scoring		Third period		No scoring
No scoring		overtime period		Grayson Downing (10) – 02:00
Kieran Millan – ( 44 saves / 47 shots )		Goalie stats		Casey DeSmith – ( 32 saves / 34 shots )

March 10	Boston University	4–2	New Hampshire	Agganis Arena	Recap
Chris Connolly (9) – 11:55		First period	No scoring
Sahir Gill (12) – 17:16		Second period	Steve Moses (22) – 10:16
Matt Nieto (14) – 04:54; Ryan Santana (3) – 07:18		Third period	Connor Hardowa (6) – pp – 04:04
Kieran Millan – ( 33 saves / 35 shots )		Goalie stats	Casey DeSmith – ( 28 saves / 32 shots )

March 11	Boston University	5–4	2ot	New Hampshire	Agganis Arena	Recap
Evan Rodrigues (2) – 04:11		First period		Casey Thrush (3) – 08:09; Casey Thrush (4) – 14:30
Garrett Noonan (15) – 16:11; Garrett Noonan (16) – 18:58		Second period		Greg Burke (6) – pp – 01:42; Mike Borisenok (6) – sh – 04:34
Wade Megan (19) – 00:30		Third period		No scoring
Alex Chiasson (14) – 06:42		Overtime		No scoring
Kieran Millan – ( 64 saves / 68 shots )		Goalie stats		Casey DeSmith – ( 45 saves / 50 shots )

Boston University Wins Series 2–1

==== (4) Maine vs. (5) Merrimack ====
March 9	Maine	2–1	Merrimack	Alfond Arena	Recap
No scoring		First period	Mike Collins (10) – pp – 15:33
Joey Diamond (23) – 07:50; Kyle Beattie (6) – 12:04		Second period	No scoring
No scoring		Third period	No scoring
Dan Sullivan – ( 19 saves / 20 shots )		Goalie stats	Joe Cannata – ( 39 saves / 41 shots )

March 10	Maine	2–5	Merrimack	Alfond Arena	Recap
Matt Mangene (15) – sh – 03:51		First period	Rhett Bly (5) – 05:39; Josh Myers (5) – pp – 13:33
No scoring		Second period	Jeff Velleca (10) – 17:55; Rhett Bly (6) – 18:15
Adam Shemansky (11) – pp – 08:03		Third period	Dan Kolomatis (1) – en – 19:58
Dan Sullivan – ( 28 saves / 32 shots )		Goalie stats	Joe Cannata – ( 26 saves / 28 shots )

March 11	Maine	2–1	Merrimack	Alfond Arena	Recap
Spencer Abbott (20) – pp – 11:38		First period	No scoring
Brice O'Connor (3) – 03:43		Second period	Ryan Flanigan (11) – 09:16
No scoring		Third period	No scoring
Dan Sullivan – ( 19 saves / 20 shots )		Goalie stats	Joe Cannata – ( 28 saves / 30 shots )

Maine Wins Series 2–1

=== Semifinals ===
==== (1) Boston College vs. (7) Providence ====
March 16	Boston College	4–2	Providence	TD Garden	Recap
Paul Carey (15) – 01:15; Destry Straight (3) – 08:35		First period	Barrett Kaib (1) – 02:28; Derek Army (11) – 04:33
Johnny Gaudreau (17) – pp – 03:58		Second period	No scoring
Steven Whitney (13) – 08:00		Third period	No scoring
Parker Milner – ( 25 saves / 27 shots )		Goalie stats	Alex Beaudry – ( 27 saves / 30 shots )

==== (3) Boston University vs. (4) Maine ====
March 16	Boston University	3–5	Maine	TD Garden	Recap
Alex Chiasson (15) – 02:46		First period	No scoring
Matt Nieto (15) – pp – 06:16		Second period	Joey Diamond (24) – pp – 00:46; Will O'Neill (2) – 11:22; Will O'Neill (3) – pp – 18:25
Matt Nieto (16) – 04:03		Third period	Mark Anthoine (12) – pp – 07:43; Joey Diamond (25) – pp en – 19:31
Kieran Millan – ( 35 saves / 39 shots )		Goalie stats	Dan Sullivan – ( 25 saves / 28 shots )

=== Championship ===
==== (1) Boston College vs. (4) Maine ====
March 17	Boston College	4–1	Maine	TD Garden	Recap
Johnny Gaudreau (18) – 05:24; Johnny Gaudreau (19) – pp – 07:31		First period	No scoring
Pat Mullane (9) – 18:39		Second period	Brian Flynn (18) – 07:37
Barry Almeida (22) – en – 18:59		Third period	No scoring
Parker Milner – ( 40 saves / 41 shots )		Goalie stats	Dan Sullivan – ( 36 saves / 39 shots )

== Tournament awards ==
=== All-Tournament Team ===
- F Alex Chiasson (Boston University)
- F Joey Diamond (Maine)
- F Johnny Gaudreau* (Boston College)
- D Brian Dumoulin (Boston College)
- D Will O'Neill (Maine)
- G Parker Milner (Boston College)

* Tournament MVP(s)
