= Joey Velasco =

Filipino religious painter

- Born: March 18, 1967
- Died: July 20, 2010 (aged 43)
- Notable work: Hapag ng Pag-asa (2005)
- Style: Religious

Joey Velasco (March 18, 1967 – July 20, 2010) was a Filipino religious painter and sculptor known for his artwork Hapag ng Pag-asa which depicted Jesus Christ dining with street children.

== Background ==
Joey Velasco began his artistic career when he saw an image of the Madonna in a dream after he had undergone an operation – leading to him making Mary, mother of Jesus as the subject of his first work. Velasco also decided to make Jesus Christ as the main subject of many of his works attributing the Christian figure as the reason he lived. He also incorporated the daily situation of Filipinos in his works. Aside from paintings, he also did sculptures. Having no formal art training, Velasco who was a former Salesian seminarian and businessman described himself as a "heartist" and a "socio-spiritual realist".

He had 30 major paintings, among them were Cast All Your Cares, Mga Munting Sireneo, That We May Live, Thy Will Be Done, and Gusto Kong Maging Bayani. His most known work is the Hapag ng Pag-asa, a 2005 Last Supper-inspired work which depicted Jesus Christ dining with street children (all of which are based on actual Filipino indigent youths) instead of his apostles. The painting was widely reproduced as postcards, calendars, and posters.

Velasco died on July 20, 2010, at age 43 after a five-year bout of kidney disease.

After his death, the Joey Velasco Foundation was set up with the help of Gawad Kalinga to aid street children in select communities in Metro Manila.

== Personal life ==
Velasco was married to Queeny, with whom he had four children.
