= Joey Schusler =

American mountain bike racer (born 1990)

Personal information
- Full name: Joseph Schusler
- Nickname: Joey
- Born: March 26, 1990 (age 36) USA
- Height: 5 ft 10 in (1.78 m)
- Weight: 160 lb (73 kg)

Cycling career
- Sport: Cycling
- Current team: Yeti/Fox Racing Shox World Cup
- Discipline: MTB
- Role: Rider, Racer
- Rider type: DH, 4X, DS, DJ, XC, Enduro

Major wins
- Colorado State Champion (2 Wins); USA Collegiate National Champion (3 Wins); Professional Podiums (22 Podiums); USA National Team Member (3 times)

Joey Schusler (born March 26, 1990) is an American professional downhill mountain bike racer residing in Boulder, Colorado.

== Competitive history ==
Schusler started racing the Mountain States Cup in Colorado at the age of 13. By 14 he had risen to be one of the top ranked riders in Colorado. In 2005 he began racing in the USA National Series where he over the next two years he would rise to become one of the top 3 USA juniors. In 2007 he competed in his first UCI World Championships in Ft. William, Scotland. In 2008 he competed in his second UCI World Championships race in Val di Sole, Italy.

By 2009 Schusler started out his first season as a full-time professional and UCI Elite rider. Competing as a pro in the USA National Series, Schusler finished in second place in the overall championship. Schusler was also selected to be on the USA World Championship team in Australia in 2009 where he finished 32nd in the world.

== Personal life ==
Schusler studied Technology, Arts, and Digital Media, as well as Creative Advertising in the School of Journalism at the University of Colorado at Boulder .

Yeti Cycles has signed Schusler on board to be a development rider racing the entire UCI World Cup Series in 2010 and 2011.
