= Joey Groenbast =

Dutch footballer

Personal information
- Date of birth: 4 May 1995 (age 31)
- Place of birth: Zoetermeer, Netherlands
- Height: 1.84 m (6 ft 0 in)
- Position: Right-back

Team information
- Current team: Wilhelmus

Youth career
- 2003–2007: FC Zoetermeer
- 2007–2010: Feyenoord
- 2010–2014: Sparta
- 2014–2015: Go Ahead Eagles

Senior career*
Years	Team	Apps	(Gls)
2015–2019	Go Ahead Eagles	58	(0)
2020	Sutherland Sharks	3	(0)
2021–2022	OFC	1	(0)
2026-	Wilhelmus		
- * Club domestic league appearances and goals as of 21:11, 19 June 2022 (UTC)

Joey Groenbast (born 4 May 1995) is a Dutch footballer who plays as a right-back for amateur side Wilhelmus. Groenbast is of Surinamese descent.

== Career ==
Groenbast started playing football for hometown club = FC Zoetermeer and joined the Feyenoord academy in 2007. He moved to Sparta in 2010. He was part of Go Ahead Eagles youth set-up in 2014 and he made his professional debut for the club in 2016.

In June 2021, Groenbast joined Derde Divisie club OFC Oostzaan. In summer 2026, he was snapped up by Wilhelmus.
