= Joey Bond =

Romanian Canadian Tai Chi master, presenter, author, mentalist

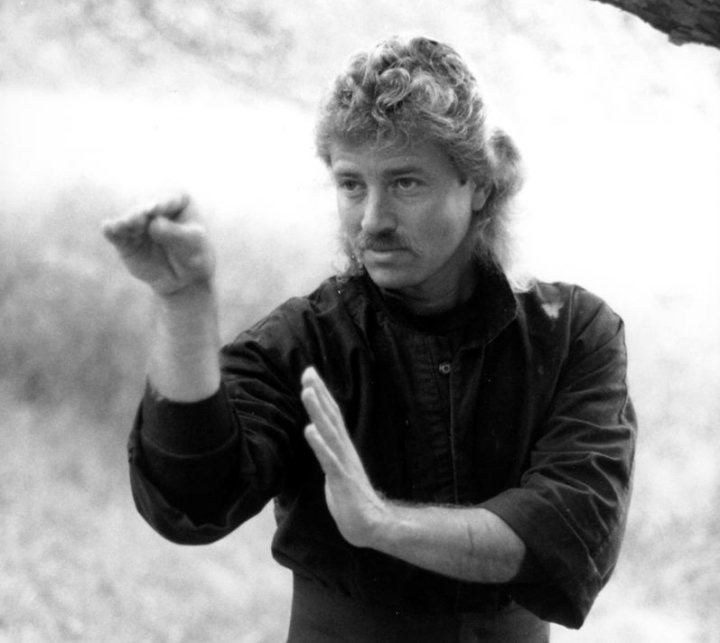
- Joey Bond Tai Chi Master
- Born: March 30, 1948 (age 78); Sibiu, Romania
- Style: Yang-style tai chi; Northern Praying Mantis; Chen Family/qigong; Shaolin Kempo Karate

Other information
- Notable students: Andrew Dearlove; Maggie Will; Ben Taylor

Joey Bond (born March 30, 1948) is a Romanian-born author, composer, and teacher of Tai Chi. He had a nationally syndicated PBS series which aired on 134 stations, which includes worldwide distribution, from 1994–present, entitled Tai Chi Innerwave with Joey Bond, comprising 23 programs. Bond teaches Tai Chi Ch’uan and other martial art styles. His students have included golfer Maggie Will and musician Ben Taylor. Bond is, as well, a professional magician.

Over a 20-year period Bond studied the Yogic Saraswati tradition under the tutelage of teacher Swami Satchidananda. While living in Taipei, Taiwan, from 1973–1975, he studied tai chi, qigong, Northern Praying Mantis, and other styles and absorbed Taoist and Buddhist practices. He is the author of the book entitled See Man Jump See God Fall: Tai Chi vs. Technology, released in 1997. He is a graduate of The Magic Castle in Hollywood, California, and performs magic acts which demonstrate mentalism. Bond's album Steel Dragonfly: Dance of the Tao includes the title track "Jade Pillow" that was used in his PBS series, for which he also composed the music.

== Early studies and teaching ==
Bond was born and raised in Sibiu, Romania and is of Roma ethnicity. He moved to Montreal, Quebec, Canada, and is a naturalized Canadian citizen. He presently lives in Mill Valley, California and has permanent resident status in the United States.

Over a 20-year-period, he studied the Yogic Saraswati tradition, under the tutelage of teacher Swami Satchidananda. From 1973–1975, he lived in Taipei, Taiwan where he studied Tai Chi, Qigong, Northern Praying Mantis, and absorbed Taoist and Buddhist practices. Bond then established himself as a Tai Chi teacher in Montreal, teaching Tai Chi and qigong, along with various weaponry including Swordplay, Staff and Iron Fan. Among Bond's notable students are Maggie Will, three times winner on the LPGA Tour, Ben Taylor, son of folk rock artist James Taylor, Margot Lande of the Bronfman family, among others.

Bond teaches the Tai Chi style developed by the Yang family, and which he learned from the Gao family; the latter were disciples of Yang Pin Er. He expanded his studies in the local Wushu style, in and around Taiwan, in cities like Taichung. He went on to study other Wushu styles as well; Northern Praying Mantis, Chen Family/qigong silk-reeling, Shaolin Kempo Karate and some unique forms of Chinese Boxing.

== Tai Chi Innerwave with Joey Bond (PBS series) ==
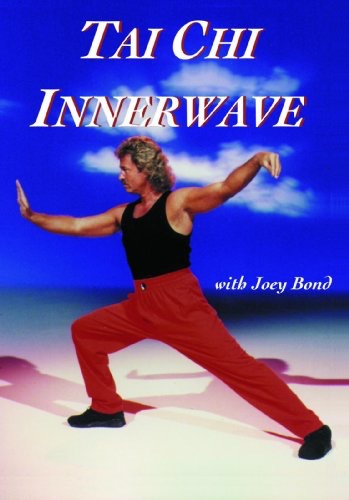
Joey Bond Tai Chi Innerwave PBS Series

Bond's PBS series Tai Chi Innerwave demonstrates Beijing-style tai chi from Mainland China, filmed at PBS/WEDU television studios. It became Nationally Syndicated and is arguably the longest running health series on the PBS Network from 1994–2002. It also received international exposure in countries like the Netherlands. Bond demonstrates the Yang family legacy of Martial Arts. The 23 programs comprising the Tai Chi Innerwave series were carried by over 100 PBS stations across the US and Canada from 1994–2002. The Tampa Tribune took note that "Master Instructor Bond masterfully demonstrates taking control of your body and mind".

The movement is supple and slow, as if the air around his body were velvety thick. The breathing is measured and deep ... And the stance is strong and silent, as if the earth beneath his feet were a sacred altar. Joey Bond is moving his mind around and viewers are watching nationwide.

— The Tampa Tribune, Jennifer Barrs, November 18, 1995

In 1997 Janson Media became exclusive copyright distributor of the DVD series, Tai Chi Innerwave with Joey Bond. The DVD is held by the Phoenix Public Library and the Free Library of Philadelphia among many others. Gustavo Sagastume, Vice President of PBS, was the Executive Producer. Joey Bond was the director and writer. The musical soundtrack presented on the PBS Tai Chi Innerwave series is composed by Bond which can be found on his Steel Dragonfly Album.

Wisconsin Bookwatch wrote that the PBS series is; "An excellent introduction to an art useful for exercise, relieving stress and tension, posture improvement, and mental focus".

The content of the PBS television series intended to bridge a gap between Eastern meditation and Western physical fitness, using tai chi's slow, rhythmic movements to create harmony between mind and body. The tai chi postures demonstrated included White Crane Spreads Wings, Wave Hands Like Clouds and Part the Wild Horse’s Mane. The program promised viewers of all ages and physical abilities an increase of strength and endurance, improving postural alignment and body tonicity, reducing overall tension and sharpening mental acuity. Bond described the benefits of tai chi; "...dynamic exercise approach that delivers both cardiovascular and muscular strength, as well as reinforcing heartfelt creative expression"

== Steel Dragonfly Album ==
Bond composed the music for his album Steel Dragonfly: Dance of the Tao for use in his PBS series, featuring the title track "Jade Pillow". Other songs on the album include "Life to Life", "Dream Time", "Out There", "Pearl Asylum", and "Tong Ship Sailing".

Title track "Jade Pillow" from Bond's CD Steel Dragonfly: Dance of the Tao‍—‌composed for use in his PBS series Tai Chi Innerwave

== Magician and writer ==
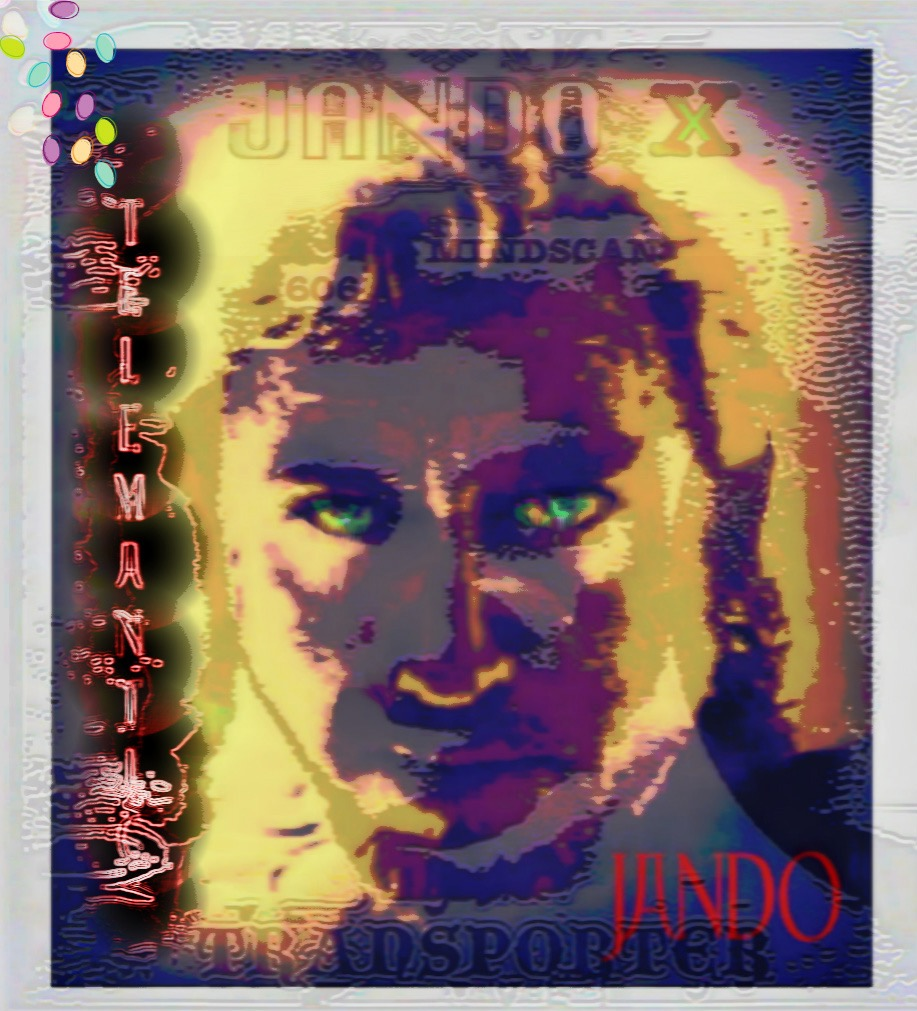
Joey Bond Magician Transporter Poster

As a professional magician, Bond uses the stage name Jando. Bond entertains audiences with magic performances that demonstrate Mentalism, a performing art in which its practitioners, known as mentalists, appear to demonstrate highly developed mental or intuitive abilities.

He has entertained audiences behind closed doors in the Los Angeles underground scene at Petit Ermitage, The Aqua Lounge in Beverly Hills, as well as the ‘Séance Room’ at the legendary Magic Castle in Hollywood. He has also performed his mentalist act at private events in San Francisco. He has given private presentations for Kevin Bacon at the Sarasota Film Festival in Florida, Bonnie Raitt in Mill Valley, California, Dana Carvey in San Anselmo, California, and the Bronfman family of Canada and other celebrities. Bond has been a member of The Magic Castle since 2004. He fulfilled all requirements set forth by The Academy of Magical Arts, Inc. and earned his diploma, thus receiving all rights and privileges of the Magic Castle.

In 1997, Bond released his book entitled See Man Jump... See God Fall: Tai Chi vs Technology. The book "describes the battle between tai chi and Technology and takes you on a journey inward to greater fulfillment."
