= De beste singer-songwriter van Vlaanderen =

De beste singer-songwriter van Vlaanderen (meaning The best singer-songwriter of Flanders) was a music contest program broadcast in Dutch on Belgian-Flemish commercial television channel VIER. It was patterned after the similar series De beste singer-songwriter van Nederland the pioneer programme of the series De beste singer-songwriter abbreviated as DBSSW. The Belgian series was launched on 7 November 2013 and lasted until 26 December 2013 and was hosted by Lisa Smolders. The jury members were Lisa Smolders, Sarah Bettens and Frank Vander linden. The series winner was Joey Brocken. The runner-up was Ricardo González Candia, with Debbie Jacob third and Lisa Castelli fourth. The series was discontinued in Belgium after just one season.

== Summary ==
Season #	From	To	Host	Winner
1	7 November 2013	26 December 2013	Lisa Smolders	Joey Brocken
