= Joey Giambra (musician) =

American jazz musician (1933–2020)

- Birth name: Joseph Giambra
- Born: October 31, 1933; Buffalo, New York, U.S.
- Died: May 14, 2020 (aged 86); Buffalo, New York, U.S.
- Genres: Jazz
- Instruments: Trumpet
- Education: SUNY Buffalo State (BS)
- Children: 2

Joseph G. Giambra (October 31, 1933 – May 14, 2020) was an American jazz musician, actor, and businessman.

== Early life ==
Giambra was born in Buffalo, New York, in 1933. His elementary school teacher, Anne Rodenhoffer, sparked his interest in music and drama. While attending Hutchinson Central Technical High School, he formed a band.

== Career ==
Giambra was a trumpeter, composer, bandleader, and actor in New York. He joined the Buffalo Police Department in 1963 and earned a degree in criminology from SUNY Buffalo State at the age of 44. He also owned two restaurants, the Hard Times Cafe, which started in Allentown and moved to Hertel Avenue, and the Rib Crib, on East Chippewa Street.

He appeared in the films Hide in Plain Sight, Buffalo '66, Prizzi's Honor, Nighthawks and Marshall.

== Personal life ==
Giambra and his wife, Shirley, had two children. Giambra died from COVID-19 in Buffalo, New York, during the COVID-19 pandemic in New York.

== Filmography ==
=== Film ===
Year	Title	Role	Notes
1980	Hide in Plain Sight	Italian Cook	
1991	Slave Master	Police Detective Sergeant	
1994	Minges Alley	Uncle Louie	
1998	Buffalo '66	Man in Donut Shop	Uncredited
2002	Manna from Heaven	Clifford	
2017	Marshall	Farmer	
2018	Cold Brook	Frank	
2021	Bad Cupid	Old Man at Bar	
