= William J. Flynn (athletic director) =

American college athletics administrator

Biographical details
- Born: July 13, 1915; South Boston, Massachusetts, U.S.
- Died: June 27, 1997 (age 81); Brighton, Massachusetts, U.S.
- Education: Boston College

Playing career
- 1936–1938: Boston College
- Position: Tight end

Coaching career (HC unless noted)
- 1948–1951 1954–1957: Boston College (Asst.); Boston College (Ends)

Administrative career (AD unless noted)
- 1957–1990: Boston College

Accomplishments and honors

Awards
- NFF Distinguished American Award (1985); Boston College Eagles Football Jersey retired

William J. Flynn (July 13, 1915 – June 27, 1997) was an American college athletics administrator. He was the athletic director at Boston College from 1957 to 1990. He began his association with Boston College in 1935 as a student athlete. He was also a mathematics professor and assistant football coach at the school.

== Early life ==
Flynn was born on July 13, 1915, in South Boston. He grew up in Dorchester and graduated from The English High School. He enrolled in Boston College in 1935. He earned nine varsity letters in football, baseball, and hockey, and was named captain of the football team in 1938. He graduated with a Bachelor of Science in Education in 1939 and a Master of Education in 1940. In 1940 he became a teacher and coach at Cranwell Preparatory School in Lenox, Massachusetts. After the Attack on Pearl Harbor, Flynn joined the Federal Bureau of Investigation. He worked as an anti-espionage agent in Houston and Newark, New Jersey, until the end of the war. After the war, Flynn returned to Cranwell Prep.

== Early career at BC ==
In 1947, Flynn left Cranwell to become a mathematics instructor at BC. From 1948 to 1951 he was an assistant football coach. In 1951 he applied to succeed head football coach Denny Myers, but fellow assistant Mike Holovak was chosen instead. In 1952 he was appointed Director of the Boston College Alumni Association. In 1954 he again joined the football coaching staff. After the 1956 football season, Boston College was evicted from Fenway Park by Tom Yawkey and Flynn led the fundraising drive for a new football stadium.

== Athletic director ==
On July 1, 1957, Flynn succeeded John P. Curley as athletic director. He remained as an assistant football coach during the 1957 Boston College Eagles football team, which put him in the unique situation of being head football coach Mike Holovak's superior and subordinate.

At the time Flynn took office, BC was constructing three new athletic facilities - Alumni Stadium, McHugh Forum, and Roberts Center, which marked the first time that Boston College had all of its athletic facilities on campus. In 1979, Boston College's student recreation complex was named after Flynn. He also oversaw an expansion of Alumni Stadium and the construction of the Conte Forum.

Flynn was responsible accepting Dave Gavitt's invitation for BC to join the newly-formed Big East Conference and hired a number of successful basketball coaches (Bob Cousy, Chuck Daly, Tom Davis, Gary Williams, and Jim O'Brien).

On August 28, 1990, Flynn announced that he would retire upon the appointment of a successor. One of his final acts as AD was to fire head football coach Jack Bicknell. On December 10, 1990, Tulane athletic director and Boston College alumnus Chet Gladchuk Jr. was hired to succeed Flynn.

Flynn died on June 27, 1997, at St. Elizabeth's Medical Center in Brighton, Massachusetts. He was 81 years old.
