= Battle of Boston =

The Battle of Boston may refer to:

- Another nickname for the Green Line Rivalry, a rivalry between the athletic teams of Boston College and Boston University
- The Siege of Boston, one of the initial engagements of the American Revolutionary War
