= Boston College Eagles =

Intercollegiate sports teams of Boston College

- University: Boston College
- Nickname: Eagles
- NCAA: Division I (FBS)
- Conference: Atlantic Coast Conference (primary); Hockey East; NEISA (sailing); EISA (alpine skiing)
- Athletic director: Blake James
- Location: Chestnut Hill, Massachusetts
- Varsity teams: 29
- Football stadium: Alumni Stadium
- Basketball arena: Conte Forum
- Ice hockey arena: Kelley Rink
- Baseball stadium: Eddie Pellagrini Diamond at Harrington Athletics Village
- Rowing venue: Harry Parker Boathouse
- Sailing venue: Savin Hill Yacht Club
- Colors: Maroon and gold
- Mascot: Baldwin the Eagle
- Fight song: For Boston
- Website: bceagles.com

Team NCAA championships
- 7

Atlantic Coast Conference logo in Boston College's colors

The Boston College Eagles are the athletic teams that represent Boston College, located in Chestnut Hill, Massachusetts. They compete as a member of the National Collegiate Athletic Association (NCAA) Division I level (Football Bowl Subdivision (FBS) sub-level for football), primarily competing in the Atlantic Coast Conference (ACC).

== Nickname and mascot history ==
The Eagle nickname and mascot for Boston College's teams were given by Rev. Edward McLaughlin. Fr. McLaughlin, incensed at a Boston newspaper cartoon depicting the champion BC track team as a cat licking clean a plate of its rivals, penned a passionate letter to the student newspaper, The Heights, in the newspaper's first year in 1920. "It is important that we adopt a mascot to preside at our pow-wows and triumphant feats," wrote Fr. McLaughlin. "And why not the Eagle, symbolic of majesty, power, and freedom?"

The Boston College mascot is Baldwin the Eagle, an American bald eagle whose name is a pun derived from the bald head of the eagle and the word "win."

The school colors are maroon and gold. The fight song, "For Boston", was composed by T.J. Hurley, Class of 1885, and is America's oldest college fight song.

== Conferences and affiliations ==
Men's sports	Women's sports
Baseball	Softball
Basketball	Basketball
Cross country	Cross country
Golf	Golf
Ice hockey	Ice hockey
Football	Field hockey
Soccer	Soccer
Swimming & diving	Swimming & diving
Tennis	Tennis
Track and field^{†}	Track and field^{†}
	Lacrosse
	Rowing
	Volleyball
Co-ed sports
Fencing
Sailing
Skiing
† – Track and field includes both indoor and outdoor.

The Eagles compete in NCAA Division I as members of the Atlantic Coast Conference. The women's rowing team competes in the Eastern Association of Women's Rowing Colleges (EAWRC) as well as the ACC. The men's and women's ice hockey teams compete in Hockey East. Skiing and sailing are also non-ACC. Boston College is one of only 15 universities in the country offering NCAA Division I football (Football Bowl Subdivision), Division I men's and women's basketball, and Division I hockey.

A founding member of the original Big East Conference, the Eagles moved to the Atlantic Coast Conference on July 1, 2005. Up to that point, Boston College was the only Big East member affiliated with the Catholic Church that played football in the conference. As of 2018, all the football-playing members of the Big East's successor American Athletic Conference are secular or Protestant institutions, while nine of the non-football replacement Big East Conference's ten members are Catholic.

=== Move to the ACC ===
On July 1, 2005, Boston College moved from the Big East to the Atlantic Coast Conference (ACC).

In 2003 the ACC announced plans to expand from nine teams to twelve. Miami, Syracuse, and Boston College were rumored to be the three schools under consideration, and all three met with officials from the ACC regarding membership. It was later revealed that Miami had been dissatisfied with the Big East and its leadership since a formal letter of complaint was issued by them to Big East Commissioner Mike Tranghese several years prior in 1999. Their issues went unresolved, leading to Miami's interest in the ACC—a league who had been pursuing the college football superpower since the mid-1990s, at the request of neighboring football schools Florida State, Clemson and Georgia Tech.

Connecticut Attorney General Richard Blumenthal, representing UConn (whose membership in Big East Football was then pending) led the "remaining" football schools (Virginia Tech, Rutgers, Pittsburgh, and West Virginia) in the filing of two lawsuits. One suit named the ACC, and the other named Miami and Boston College, accusing them of conspiring to weaken the Big East. Syracuse was not named as a defendant in part because they never made public comments about the ongoing situation.

In an unexpected turn, due in large measure to political pressure applied by Governor Mark Warner of Virginia, the ACC replaced Syracuse with Virginia Tech in its expansion vote. Things became even more surprising when, reached by phone at a conference in Switzerland, then-N.C. State Chancellor Marye Anne Fox cast a shocking last-minute "no" vote against Boston College. As a result, the ACC extended invitations only to Miami and Virginia Tech. Virginia Tech immediately accepted the invitation and filed court papers to get themselves out of the awkward position of suing their new conference. The remaining four plaintiffs removed Boston College from the list of defendants and asked both BC and Syracuse to join their suit. Boston College and Syracuse declined.

The Big East presidents and athletic directors met in summer 2003 to discuss replacing the departed members and establishing a process by which members would exit the conference in the future. The remaining members of the conference moved towards establishing a $5 million exit fee and 27-month waiting period for any other schools who wished to leave in the future. At a Big East meeting in Newark on October 1, conference presidents asked BC president Rev. William P. Leahy, S.J., about rumors surrounding the Eagles' intentions. Fr. Leahy conceded that the Eagles might indeed be leaving the conference. It has been suggested that BC might have remained if the Big East had spun out its non-football schools and reconfigured as an eight- or nine-team league. The Big East considered extending invitations to Penn State and Notre Dame, however neither school showed interest in joining the conference. Several models for a new conference were discussed; however it was eventually decided that the football schools would explore separating from the basketball-only schools and establish an 8-team all-sports conference. It was very quickly realized that this scenario would not be feasible because the new conference would lose its automatic NCAA basketball tournament berth and possibly its BCS bid because the football schools had not been together long enough to satisfy certain NCAA rules. It was then decided that for the time being, the conference would add additional football and basketball schools and continue in its bifurcated structure until such time as the football schools could establish their own conference. Unhappy with this decision, the administration of Boston College once again entertained overtures from the Atlantic Coast Conference.

Speculation that Chancellor Foxe, a Notre Dame trustee, cast her vote against BC so that the ACC might consider extending membership to Notre Dame was fueled by press accounts reporting that a bid to the Fighting Irish was imminent. But in October 2003, the ACC voted unanimously to invite Boston College to become their twelfth member. When BC accepted, they were returned to the lawsuit still pending against Miami by several Big East schools. In response, Boston College petitioned the Supreme Judicial Court of Massachusetts for a declaratory judgment to avoid paying the increased Big East "exit fee" that had been voted for but not yet amended to the Big East's constitution. Boston College won both decisions, but the Big East appealed. A secret settlement reported to be worth US$5 million was reached in May 2005, and as part of the settlement the ACC agreed to play a number of football games each year against Big East teams. However, this large settlement was offset by the cumulative legal fees incurred by the Big East in pursuing the litigation. Boston College joined the ACC in 2005, and was exempted from having to play football against their former conference colleagues who had been party to the lawsuit. Boston College officials have stated that the university will not schedule games against any of their former Big East Football colleagues with the exception of Syracuse. An eight-year deal to play Syracuse in football starting in 2010 has been signed, and a four-year deal to play Providence College in basketball begins in the 2006–7 school year.

Financially, the move to the ACC would appear to have been positive for the Eagles. Writing in the Charleston West Virginia Gazette, Mitch Vingle used the Big East's tax filings to examine payouts to full Big East members (schools playing both football and basketball schools) compared to payouts to ACC schools. ACC schools received an average of US$10.85 million for the tax year ending June 30, 2006, Big East full members averaged a little more than half what ACC programs took in at US$5,842,599. Additionally, Big East payments have dropped in each of the last three reporting periods.

== Championships ==
=== NCAA team championships ===
Boston College has won 7 NCAA team national championships.

- Men's (5)
  - Ice Hockey (5): 1949, 2001, 2008, 2010, 2012
- Women's (2)
  - Lacrosse (2): 2021, 2024
- see also:
  - ACC NCAA team championships
  - List of NCAA schools with the most NCAA Division I championships

=== Other team championships ===
Below are 23 national team titles that were not bestowed by the NCAA:

- Men's (2):
  - Football (1): 1940
  - Ice hockey (1), AAU: 1942
- Women's (12):
  - Rugby (1), USA Rugby: 1992
  - Sailing, Dinghy National Championship (3), ICSA: 2008, 2012, 2018, 2022
  - Sailing, Singlehanded National Championship (8), ICSA: 2008, 2009, 2011, 2012, 2013, 2014, 2016, 2017, 2019
- Co-ed (9):
  - Sailing, Team Race National Championship (2), ICSA: 2008, 2009
  - Sailing, Dinghy National Championship (2), ICSA: 2010, 2011
  - Sailing, Men's Singlehanded National Championship (1), ICSA: 2016
  - Sailing, Sloop National Championship (1) ICSA: 2009
  - Sailing, Match Race National Championship (3) ICSA: 2010, 2017, 2018

== Conference championships ==
Men's conference championships

- Football (1): 2004
- Hockey (17): 1980, 1981, 1984, 1985, 1986, 1987, 1989, 1990, 1991, 2001, 2003, 2004, 2005, 2011, 2012, 2014, 2017, 2024 - Tournament (13): 1965, 1978, 1987, 1990, 1998, 1999, 2001, 2005, 2007, 2008, 2010, 2011, 2012, 2024
- Basketball (4): 1981, 1983, 2001, 2005 - Tournament (3): 1975, 1997, 2001
- Soccer (3): 1994, 2002, 2007 - Tournament (4): 1990, 2000, 2002, 2007

Women's conference championships

- Hockey (1): 2014, 2016 - Tournament (1): 2011, 2016
- Basketball: Tournament (1): 2004
- Softball (3): 1997, 1998, 2003
- Soccer (1): 2009
- Field Hockey (2): 1998, 2003 - Tournament (3): 1994, 1997, 2003
- Lacrosse (2): 2023, 2024
- Cross Country (2): 1985, 2000

== Facilities ==
Principal athletic facilities include Alumni Stadium (capacity: 44,500); Conte Forum (8,606 for basketball), known as Kelley Rink for ice hockey (7,884); the Harrington Athletics Village, which includes Eddie Pellagrini Diamond (2,500) and the Boston College Softball Field (1,000); the Newton Campus Soccer Field; and the Flynn Recreation Complex. The Yawkey Athletics Center opened in the spring of 2005, and the Newton Campus Field Hockey Complex was completed that fall. BC students compete in 31 varsity sports, as well as a number of club and intramural teams. Boston College's athletics program has been named to the College Sports Honor Roll as one of the nation's top 20 athletic programs by U.S. News & World Report (March 18, 2002).

== Academics ==
Boston College athletes are among the most academically successful in the nation, according to the NCAA's Academic Progress Rate (APR). In 2006 Boston College received Public Recognition Awards with 14 of its sports in the top 10 percent of the nation academically. The Eagles tied Notre Dame for the highest total of any Division I-A university. Other schools having 10 or more sports honored included Navy (12), Stanford (11), and Duke (11). Teams honored were football, men's fencing, men's outdoor track, men's skiing, women's rowing, women's cross country, women's fencing, women's field hockey, women's indoor track, women's outdoor track, women's skiing, women's swimming, women's soccer, women's tennis, and women's volleyball. Boston College's football program was one of only five Division I-A teams that were so honored. The other four were Auburn, Navy, Stanford, and Duke.

== Director of Athletics ==
Athletic Director	Years	Notes
Joseph Roger Williams	1899–1901	A member of the class of 1899, Williams served as a geometry instructor as well as director of athletics.
Thomas D. Lavelle	1901–1903	A member of the class of 1901, Lavelle served as graduate manager of athletics before becoming a prominent Boston attorney
C. J. McCusker	1903	Succeeded Lavelle as graduate manager.
Rev. H. Augustine Gaynor	1912–1913	Faculty director of athletics. Transferred to St. Andrew-on-Hudson in Poughkeepsie, New York in 1913.
Rev. Henry P. Wennerberg	1913–1914	Faculty director of athletics.
Irving J. Heath	1913–1914	A member of the class of 1913, Heath was the first person to serve as graduate manager in a decade. While attending BC, he managed the track team and was responsible for establishing the crew and swimming teams at Boston College High School.
Rev. William F. McFadden	1914–1916	Faculty director of athletics.
Rev. Richard A. O'Brien, SJ	1916–1918	O'Brien joined the Boston College faculty in 1915 after completing his studies at St. Andrew-on-Hudson. He served as a professor of Latin, Greek, English, and Evidence of Religion as well as faculty director of athletics.
Rev. John P. Meagher	1918–1919	Meagher, a professor of philosophy at BC, took over as faculty director of athletics when O'Brien became a chaplain in the United States Army. Left the school for St. Andrew-on-Hudson in 1919.
Francis A. Reynolds	1919–1929	A member of the class of 1916, Reynolds was responsible for hiring football coach Frank Cavanaugh, hockey coach Fred Rocque, baseball coach Olaf Henriksen, and track coach Jack Ryder.
John P. Curley	1930–1957	A member of the class of 1913, Curley was responsible for hiring Gil Dobie and Frank Leahy. He was AD when BC won the 1941 Sugar Bowl and the 1949 NCAA Men's Ice Hockey Tournament. He resigned in 1957 to accept the new role of director of athletic facilities, where he oversaw the construction of Alumni Stadium, McHugh Forum, and Roberts Center.
William J. Flynn	1957–1990	A member of the class of 1935, Flynn served as a mathematics professor, assistant football coach, and director of the Boston College Alumni Association before becoming athletic director. Alumni Stadium, McHugh Forum, Roberts Center, and Conte Forum were all constructed during his tenure as AD. Flynn was responsible for BC joining the newly formed Big East Conference in 1979.
Chet Gladchuk Jr.	1990–1997	A member of the class of 1972, Gladchuk was a member of the Boston College football team and the son of Chet Gladchuk. During his tenure as AD, the athletic department's budget grew from $800,000 to $4.4 million. In 1994 he hired BC alum Jerry York, who led the Eagles to four NCAA Championships in men's hockey. Gladchuk was also responsible for the hiring of head football coaches Tom Coughlin and Dan Henning. In 1996, Gladchuk's investigation into gambling by football players led to the school suspending 13 players.
John Kane	1997	Kane, Boston College's associate athletic director for operations, served as BC's interim athletic director after Gladchuk left to become the AD at the University of Houston. Kane had been at BC since 1980 and had previously served as track coach at Bentley College from 1977 to 1980.
Gene DeFilippo	1997–2012	During DeFilippo's tenure as athletic director, Boston College won four national championships in men's ice hockey, 11 national team and individual championships in sailing, and had 12 consecutive winning seasons in football. He also oversaw Boston College's move from the Big East to the Atlantic Coast Conference. He fired head football coach Jeff Jagodzinski and men's basketball coach Al Skinner. His new hires, Frank Spaziani and Steve Donahue, were unable to match the success of their predecessors.
John Kane	2012	Kane was Boston College's senior associate athletics director and served as interim athletic director from October 1, 2012, until the hiring of Gene DeFilippo's successor.
Brad Bates	2012–2017	Bates finalized a $200 million strategic plan for new athletic facilities. He was responsible for hiring football coach Steve Addazio and men's basketball coach Jim Christian. During his tenure the school's marquee sports programs suffered from poor performance and decreased attendance.
Martin Jarmond	2017–2020	Jarmond was the first African-American athletic director in Boston College history. During Jarmond's tenure as AD, BC's women's lacrosse team reached the national championship game and the women's field hockey team went to its first Final Four. He hired Joanna Bernabei-McNamee, who led the women's basketball team to its best finish since joining the ACC.
Patrick Kraft	2020–2022	Since Kraft's hiring, BC won a national championship in women's lacrosse. In 2021 he hired Earl Grant to coach the men's basketball team.
Blake James	2022–present	
