= Boston College–Holy Cross football rivalry =

American college football rivalry

- Boston College Eagles Holy Cross Crusaders
- First meeting: November 8, 1896
- Latest meeting: September 9, 2023

Statistics
- Total meetings: 84
- All-time series: Boston College leads, 50–31–3
- Largest victory: Boston College, 76–0 (1949)
- Longest win streak: Boston College, 10 (1979–present)
- Current win streak: Boston College, 10 (1979–present)

Locations of Boston College and Holy Cross

The Boston College–Holy Cross football rivalry is an American college football rivalry between the Boston College Eagles and Holy Cross Crusaders.

Though the rivalry has been largely dormant since the 1980s, it was once contested annually as a season-ending game that "determined the best team in New England", as one player recalled. As of 2018, even after not playing each other for more than 30 years, each school was still the other's all-time most-played football opponent. The two teams have met 84 times; Boston College leads the series 50–31–3.

In 2012, Wally Carew wrote a book about the rivalry, "A Farewell to Glory: The Rise and Fall of an Epic Football Rivalry".

== History ==
In 1896, Holy Cross and Boston College played the first football game between the two schools, starting one of the most storied rivalries in college football.

Part of the rivalry's intensity stems from the school's shared tradition as Roman Catholic, Jesuit colleges—in fact, both were founded by the same bishop, Benedict Joseph Fenwick. The rivalry is also geographic, as the two schools are located 41 miles apart from each other in Massachusetts, and represent the state's two largest cities.

For much of the early to mid-20th century, Boston College and Holy Cross drew some of New England's largest sports crowds. To accommodate larger crowds, Boston College would schedule its Holy Cross home dates at larger venues off campus, with the 1916 matchup taking place at the Boston Red Sox' newly constructed Fenway Park. A record 54,000 attended the 1922 game at Braves Field, home of the Boston Braves baseball team. Additionally both schools participated in the round-robin series with Boston University for the Sacred Cod Trophy.

The rivalry was relatively evenly matched through the mid-1960s; by the end of 1966, Boston College held a slight edge in victories, 31–28, with 3 ties.

=== Decline ===
By the mid-1970s, however, it was clear that the rivalry was no longer competitive, as Boston College had reeled off nine straight victories, six of them by margins of 20 points or more.

The split in athletic aspirations became apparent in 1978, when the NCAA divided Division I into two groupings for football: the premier Division I-A (now known as the Football Bowl Subdivision) and the second-tier Division I-AA (now known as the Football Championship Subdivision). Initially, both Boston College and Holy Cross competed as Division I-A independents, but BC's schedule featured matchups with "power conference" teams, while most of Holy Cross' opponents were from the Ivy League or from Division I-AA.

After the 1981 season, the NCAA voted to reclassify both Holy Cross and its Ivy League opponents as Division I-AA schools. This left Boston College as the only remaining Division I-A school in New England, granting it a recruiting tool to attract prospective athletes wishing to play at the highest level and hoping to get noticed by National Football League scouts.

As a I-A school, Boston College was increasingly out of place on Holy Cross' schedule, which consisted largely of I-AA Ivy League and Yankee Conference members. Holy Cross had also turned coeducational in 1970 without expanding its student body, thereby cutting its male population in half.

By 1980, the Holy Cross rivalry game was no longer part of Boston College's student ticket package, and was mostly attended by alumni.

In 1987, BC wide receiver Darren Flutie—who had caught his first collegiate touchdown in a Holy Cross game in 1984, from his brother, former BC quarterback Doug Flutie—acknowledged that the rivalry was no longer competitive.

"I think the intensity is there, because so much is said and written during BC-Holy Cross week," Darren Flutie said. "But it was definitely a game we think is an automatic win. It was a chance to show we could dominate. We could show how much stronger we are than a Division I-AA school."

Boston College outscored Holy Cross in the final five 1980s games, 221–60, but BC head coach Jack Bicknell said he didn't take them for granted.

"You know, I never thought our series was a mismatch," he said. "Holy Cross always was competitive and well coached."

=== Cancelation ===
Following nine years of losses, including six consecutive blowouts, the Rev. John E. Brooks, Holy Cross' president, announced in February 1987 that he would end the annual rivalry. Brooks said the change was "to provide Holy Cross coaches and players with an opportunity to compete in an environment that encourages balance and fair competition."

Holy Cross' withdrawal from the rivalry was effective immediately, leaving Boston College with only half a year to plug a hole in its 1987 fall schedule. Coach Jack Bicknell hoped to pick up another Division I-AA opponent, but with most schools planning their schedules years—even decades—in advance, finding a matchup was difficult. In the end, Boston College was able to schedule a game with Texas Christian University, coming off a 3–7 campaign as members of the Southwest Conference, because NCAA sanctions had canceled TCU's game against Southern Methodist University.

While Boston College was scheduling games against opponents such as Notre Dame and USC, the Crusaders had helped found the Colonial League (later to be renamed the Patriot League). Holy Cross won the 1986 Colonial League title and went 10–0 in Division I-AA play—but its final game was a 56–26 blowout loss to Boston College, the last rivalry game played in the 1980s.

As part of its commitment to the Colonial League, Holy Cross stopped offering athletic scholarships for football in the late 1980s.

=== Return ===
The Patriot League relaxed its prohibition on scholarships in the 2010s. This allowed Boston College to consider renewing its rivalry after a three-decade pause. If an FBS team beats a non-scholarship FCS team, it does not count as a win for the purposes of qualifying for postseason bowl games. If Holy Cross could field a team with 57 students on scholarship, the game would count toward championship ratings.

"The main reason was that we have two institutions that have a long and storied rivalry," said BC athletic director Brad Bates, announcing that his team would host Holy Cross in 2018 and 2020. "And the opportunity to renew that rivalry really seemed to us to be an exciting chance to merge the two institutions and bring us together for a couple of games."

Rather than being the culmination of the schedule for both teams, the rivalry is now more of an early-season tuneup game for an ACC member hosting an FCS underdog. While many alumni of both schools welcomed the return of a traditional opponent, The Boston Globe columnist Dan Shaughnessy—a Holy Cross alumnus—said "the past is the past", and the game would simply "give the alums a great opportunity to convene and talk about the glory days."

== Notable games ==
As it was often the last game of the season for both teams, the Boston College–Holy Cross matchup provided an opportunity for one team—usually Holy Cross—to play spoiler to the other team's winning streak or postseason plans.

=== 1896: Disputed result ===
After Boston College won the first matchup in 1896, the teams met for a rematch a week later. The game devolved into a fight and ended inconclusively, with both sides claiming victory. Boston College's claim of an 8–6 victory is reflected in the listings and totals on this page, but as of 2019, Holy Cross' record book continues to list this game as a 6–4 win for the Crusaders.

=== 1940: BC undefeated ===
In 1940, Boston College went into Fenway Park and shut out the Crusaders 7–0 en route to a perfect season and a victory in the Sugar Bowl over No. 4 Tennessee.

=== 1942: Cocoanut Grove ===
On November 28, 1942, Holy Cross beat Orange Bowl-bound Boston College in "arguably the biggest upset in college football history", 55–12, at Fenway Park. The game is famous not only for the final score, which ruined BC's bid for an undefeated season, but also its aftermath. The Eagles had booked their victory party that night at the popular Cocoanut Grove nightclub in Boston, but canceled after the loss. As a result, they were absent when the club caught fire, killing 492.

=== 1949: Most lopsided win ===
Boston College wins 76–0 in the series' most lopsided game, played November 26, 1949, at Braves Field.

=== 1957: Bowl bid ruined ===
In the first rivalry game to be played at Worcester since 1932, the underdog Crusaders beat the Eagles, 14–0, ruining BC's bid for a Gator Bowl berth.

=== 1977–78: Last HC wins ===
Having lost the rivalry game for the previous nine consecutive meetings, Holy Cross reeled off its last two wins, 35–20 in 1977 in Worcester, and 30–29 in 1978 in Chestnut Hill. In the 1977 game, Holy Cross came in as a 35-point underdog. The 1978 loss was less surprising, as it was the final game in Boston College's first-ever winless season, 0–11. The BC-HC matchup would continue to be played annually for eight more years, all BC wins.

== Game results ==
Games in Boston were at the South End Grounds, 1896–1902; Fenway Park, 1916–1919, 1936–1945 and 1953–1956; Braves Field, 1920–1930 and 1946–1952; and Harvard Stadium, 1931. Boston College counts all of these as home games. Holy Cross records the Braves Field, Fenway Park and Harvard Stadium meetings as neutral-site games. For some of these years, Boston College played most of its home games at Boston's major-league ballparks; other years, hosting the Holy Cross game off-campus was a special event.

Games on the Boston College campus in Chestnut Hill, Massachusetts, were at Alumni Field, 1915 through 1935, and since 1957 at Alumni Stadium.

Holy Cross home games were at the Worcester College Grounds, 1896 through 1901, and since 1910 at Fitton Field, both in Worcester, Massachusetts.

Games in Foxborough, Massachusetts, were at Foxboro Stadium, known as Schaefer Stadium in 1971 and Sullivan Stadium in 1983.

Boston College victories	Holy Cross victories	Tie games

No.	Date	Location	Winner	Score
1	November 8, 1896	Worcester	Boston College	6–2
2	November 14, 1896^{A}	Boston	Boston College	8–6
3	October 23, 1897	Worcester	Holy Cross	10–4
4	November 25, 1897	Boston	Boston College	12–0
5	November 5, 1898	Worcester	Tie	0–0
6	November 25, 1898	Boston	Boston College	11–0
7	November 30, 1899	Boston	Boston College	17–0
8	November 9, 1901	Worcester	Holy Cross	11–0
9	November 22, 1902	Boston	Holy Cross	22–0
10	October 29, 1910	Worcester	Holy Cross	34–3
11	September 23, 1911	Worcester	Holy Cross	13–0
12	October 11, 1913	Worcester	Holy Cross	13–0
13	November 14, 1914	Worcester	Holy Cross	10–0
14	October 30, 1915	Chestnut Hill	Holy Cross	9–0
15	December 2, 1916	Boston	Boston College	17–14
16	November 10, 1917	Boston	Boston College	34–6
17	November 15, 1919	Boston	Boston College	9–7
18	December 2, 1920	Boston	Boston College	14–0
19	November 26, 1921	Boston	Holy Cross	41–0
20	December 2, 1922	Boston	Boston College	17–13
21	December 1, 1923	Boston	Boston College	16–7
22	November 29, 1924	Boston	Holy Cross	33–0
23	November 28, 1925	Boston	Boston College	17–6
24	November 27, 1926	Boston	Tie	0–0
25	November 29, 1927	Boston	Boston College	6–0
26	December 1, 1928	Boston	Boston College	19–0
27	November 30, 1929	Boston	Boston College	12–0
28	November 29, 1930	Boston	Holy Cross	7–0
29	November 26, 1931	Boston	Holy Cross	7–6
30	November 26, 1932	Worcester	Tie	0–0
31	December 2, 1933	Chestnut Hill	Boston College	13–9
32	December 1, 1934	Chestnut Hill	Holy Cross	7–2
33	November 30, 1935	Chestnut Hill	Holy Cross	20–6
34	November 28, 1936	Boston	Boston College	13–12
35	November 27, 1937	Boston	No. 17 Holy Cross	20–0
36	November 26, 1938	Boston	No. 11 Holy Cross	29–7
37	December 2, 1939	Boston	Boston College	14–0
38	November 30, 1940	Boston	No. 4 Boston College	7–0
39	November 29, 1941	Boston	Boston College	14–13
40	November 28, 1942	Boston	Holy Cross	55–12
41	November 26, 1944	Boston	Holy Cross	30–14
42	November 25, 1945	Boston	Holy Cross	46–0
43	November 30, 1946	Boston	Holy Cross	13–6

No.	Date	Location	Winner	Score
44	November 29, 1947	Boston	Holy Cross	20–6
45	November 27, 1948	Boston	Boston College	21–20
46	November 26, 1949	Boston	Boston College	76–0
47	December 2, 1950	Boston	Holy Cross	32–14
48	December 1, 1951	Boston	Boston College	19–14
49	November 28, 1952	Boston	Holy Cross	21–7
50	November 28, 1953	Boston	Boston College	6–0
51	November 27, 1954	Boston	Boston College	31–13
52	November 26, 1955	Boston	Boston College	26–7
53	December 1, 1956	Boston	Holy Cross	7–0
54	November 30, 1957	Worcester	Holy Cross	14–0
55	December 6, 1958	Chestnut Hill	Boston College	26–8
56	November 29, 1959	Worcester	Boston College	14–0
57	November 26, 1960	Chestnut Hill	Holy Cross	16–12
58	December 2, 1961	Worcester	Holy Cross	38–26
59	December 1, 1962	Chestnut Hill	Boston College	48–12
60	November 30, 1963	Worcester	Holy Cross	9–0
61	November 28, 1964	Chestnut Hill	Boston College	10–8
62	November 27, 1965	Worcester	Boston College	35–0
63	November 26, 1966	Chestnut Hill	Holy Cross	32–26
64	December 2, 1967	Worcester	Boston College	13–6
65	November 30, 1968	Chestnut Hill	Boston College	40–20
66	November 28, 1970	Chestnut Hill	Boston College	54–0
67	November 27, 1971	Foxborough	Boston College	21–7
68	December 2, 1972	Chestnut Hill	Boston College	41–11
69	December 1, 1973	Worcester	Boston College	42–21
70	November 30, 1974	Chestnut Hill	Boston College	38–6
71	November 29, 1975	Worcester	Boston College	24–10
72	November 27, 1976	Chestnut Hill	Boston College	59–6
73	November 26, 1977	Worcester	Holy Cross	35–20
74	December 2, 1978	Chestnut Hill	Holy Cross	30–29
75	December 1, 1979	Worcester	Boston College	13–10
76	November 29, 1980	Chestnut Hill	Boston College	27–26
77	November 28, 1981	Worcester	Boston College	28–24
78	November 20, 1982	Chestnut Hill	Boston College	35–10
79	November 19, 1983	Foxborough	No. 18 Boston College	47–7
80	December 1, 1984	Worcester	No. 8 Boston College	45–10
81	November 23, 1985	Chestnut Hill	Boston College	38–7
82	November 22, 1986	Worcester	Boston College	56–26
83	September 8, 2018	Chestnut Hill	Boston College	62–14
84	September 9, 2023	Chestnut Hill	Boston College	31–28
Series: Boston College leads 50–31–3

^A Disputed result; Holy Cross records this as a Holy Cross victory, 6–4.

== See also ==
- List of NCAA college football rivalry games
- Sacred Cod Trophy
