= Chet Gladchuk Jr. =

American college athletics administrator, football player, and coach

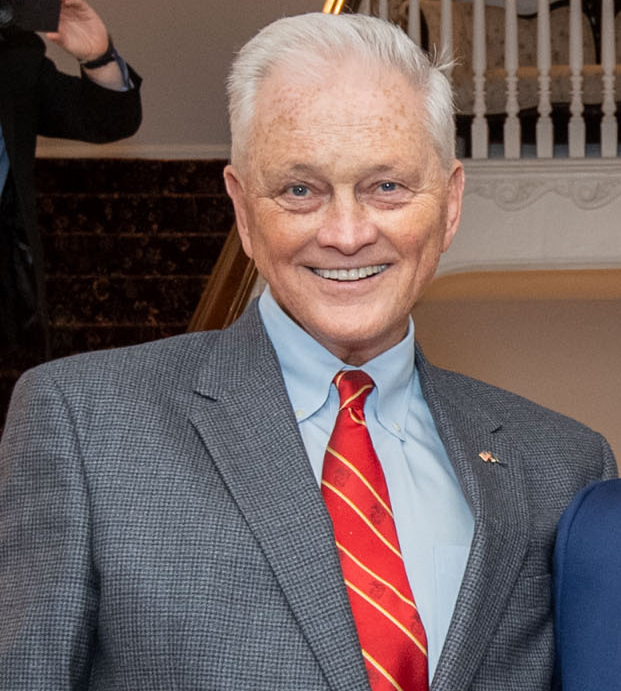
- Gladchuk in 2023

Biographical details
- Born: 1950 (age 75–76)

Playing career
- 1970–1972: Boston College
- Position: Center

Administrative career (AD unless noted)
- 1978–1985: UMass (assistant AD)
- 1985–1988: Syracuse (associate AD)
- 1988–1990: Tulane
- 1990–1997: Boston College
- 1997–2001: Houston
- 2001–2025: Navy

Chester Stephen Gladchuk Jr. (born 1950) is an American former college athletics administrator and American football player and coach. He was the athletic director at the United States Naval Academy from 2001 to 2025. Before the Academy, Gladchuk served as the athletic director at Tulane University from 1988 to 1990, at Boston College from 1990 to 1997, and at the University of Houston from 1997 to 2001.

== Early career ==
Gladchuk attended Worcester Academy and then played college football at Boston College from 1970 to 1972.

He coached high school football in New Hampton, New Hampshire before moving to the University of Massachusetts Amherst, where he worked as an assistant athletic director and earned a master's degree in sports administration.

== Boston College ==
During Gladchuk's tenure at Boston College, the athletic department's budget grew from $800,000 to $4.4 million.

Soon after becoming AD, Gladchuk hired Tom Coughlin to coach the football team. Coughlin left before the 1994 season to become head coach of the NFL's expansion Jacksonville Jaguars. Gladchuk replaced him with Dan Henning. In 1996, Gladchuk investigated allegations of gambling by football players, which led to the school suspending 13 players.

In 1992, men's hockey coach Len Ceglarski retired and Gladchuk promoted longtime assistant Steve Cedorchuk. During Cedorchuk's tenure as head coach, he promised more scholarships than the school could give. Cedorchuk was forced out after two seasons and Gladchuk hired Mike Milbury to succeed him. However, Milbury resigned before coaching a game due to "philosophical differences" with the athletic department. He was replaced by BC alum Jerry York, who led the Eagles to four NCAA Championships.

In 1997, men's basketball coach Jim O'Brien left BC for Ohio State after three of his recruits were rejected by the admissions department.

== Naval Academy ==
After a four-year stint at Houston, Gladchuk was named the 28th athletic director of the Navy Midshipmen on September 3, 2001 to replace the retiring Jack Lengyel.

Under his watch, the Midshipmen added six sports teams to expand to 36, tied for the most by an NCAA Division I Football Bowl Subdivision (FBS) school. Navy also won the Commander-in-Chief's Trophy 12 times and ten consecutive Patriot League Presidents' Cups, the latter the longest win streak for the trophy in conference history. Gladchuk also facilitated Navy's football entry into the American Athletic Conference in 2015. He received the 2016 NFF John L. Toner Award from the National Football Foundation.

Gladchuk announced his retirement on March 31, 2025. At the time of his retirement, he was the second longest-tenured athletic director in the FBS.

== Personal life ==
Gladchuk's father, Chet Gladchuk, also played college football at Boston College before playing professionally with the New York Giants of the National Football League (NFL) and the Montreal Alouettes of the Interprovincial Rugby Football Union, now part of the Canadian Football League (CFL).
