= Sacred Cod Trophy =

American college football rivalry

Boston College Eagles	Holy Cross Crusaders	Boston University Terriers
- Originated: 1954; 72 years ago
- Ended: 1962; 64 years ago
- Current Holder: Holy Cross (Defunct)
Boston College (3); 1954 1955 1958	Holy Cross (2); 1956 1961	Boston University (0)
- Shared Awards (3); 1957 1958 1960

Locations of Boston University, Boston College, and Holy Cross

The Sacred Cod Trophy was awarded to each season's winner of the American college football series between the teams of Boston University (Boston University Terriers), Boston College (Boston College Eagles), and College of the Holy Cross (Holy Cross Crusaders).

The Boston University-Boston College game was normally played in early to mid November, the Boston University-Holy Cross game normally played in mid October, and the Boston College–Holy Cross game played as the last game of the season.

At the end of the series, the Boston College Eagles holds the most trophy victories with 3, the Holy Cross Crusaders have won 2, and the teams have shared the trophy on 3 occasions.

== History of the trophy ==
The Sacred Cod Trophy was the idea of the Boston University chapter of the Delta Sigma Pi fraternity. The trophy was first awarded in the 1954 season to Boston College. Boston College dominated the BU-BC game during this span winning 8 of 9 games with Boston University's sole victory coming in 1959. Holy Cross also dominated the BU-Holy Cross game winning 6 of 8. As a result, the BC–Holy Cross game most often determined who won the trophy. In 1962, the BU-Holy Cross game was not played due to the failure to find an available date, thus the trophy was not awarded. The series ended in 1963 when Boston College and Boston University decided to no longer schedule each other. The 1963 game was postponed due to the assassination of John F. Kennedy and was never rescheduled.

== The trophy ==
The trophy was a gold cup topped with a cod fish a symbol of the Commonwealth of Massachusetts. The name was inspired by the Sacred Cod, a wooden fish that has hung in the Massachusetts State House since the mid 1700s.

== Game results and trophy winners ==
Boston University victories	Boston College victories	Holy Cross victories	Shared trophies and tied games	No game played, no trophy awarded

Season	Trophy Winner	Boston University – Holy Cross score	Boston University – Boston College score	Boston College – Holy Cross score
1954	Boston College (1)	Holy Cross 14–13	Boston College 7–6	Boston College 31–13
1955	Boston College (2)	Holy Cross 20–12	Boston College 40–12	Boston College 26–7
1956	Holy Cross (1)	Holy Cross 21–12	Boston College 13–0	Holy Cross 7–0
1957	Shared (1)	Boston University 35–28	Boston College 27–2	Holy Cross 14–0
1958	Boston College (3)	Holy Cross 16–8	Boston College 18–13	Boston College 26–8
1959	Shared (2)	Holy Cross 17–8	Boston University 26–7	Boston College 14–0
1960	Shared (3)	Boston University 20–14	Boston College 23–14	Holy Cross 16–12
1961	Holy Cross (2)	Holy Cross 20–7	Boston College 10–7	Holy Cross 38–26
1962	N/A	Not played	Boston College 41–25	Boston College 48–12
All-time Records		Holy Cross: 6–2 (.750)	Boston College: 8–1 (.889)	Boston College: 5–4 (.556)

== See also ==
- Green Line Rivalry
- Boston College–Holy Cross football rivalry
- Boston University–Holy Cross rivalry
