= Martin Jarmond =

American college athletics administrator

Biographical details
- Born: November 22, 1979 (age 46); Fayetteville, North Carolina, U.S.
- Education: University of North Carolina, Wilmington (BA); Ohio University (MBA)

Playing career
- 1997–2001: UNC Wilmington
- Position: Guard

Administrative career (AD unless noted)
- 2003–2009: Michigan State (assistant AD)
- 2009–2017: Ohio State (assistant AD/deputy AD)
- 2017–2020: Boston College
- 2020–2026: UCLA

Martin Jarmond (born November 22, 1979) is an American college athletics administrator. He served as the athletic director at Boston College from 2017 to 2020 and at the University of California, Los Angeles (UCLA) from 2020 to 2026.

== Early life and education ==
Jarmond played college basketball at the University of North Carolina Wilmington, where he was a two-time captain for the Seahawks. He holds an MBA and a master's degree in sports administration from Ohio University.

== Career ==
Jarmond was the associate athletic director at Michigan State University (2003–2009) before serving as the deputy director of athletics at Ohio State University (2009–2017). In 2017, he was hired as the athletic director at Boston College, becoming, at 37, the youngest athletic director among the Power Five conferences and the first African-American athletic director in BC history.

In 2020, Jarmond was hired as the athletic director at UCLA. He was dismissed on August 31, 2026.
