= John P. Curley =

American college athletics administrator

John Curley
Biographical details
- Born: June 1, 1891; Newport, Rhode Island, U.S.
- Died: December 12, 1973 (age 82); Hyannis, Massachusetts, U.S.
- Education: Boston College

Administrative career (AD unless noted)
- 1930–1957 1957–1965: Boston College; Boston College (Dir. of Ath. Fac.)

John Patrick Curley (June 1, 1891 – December 12, 1973) was an American college athletics administrator who served as the athletic director at Boston College from 1930 to 1957.

== Early life ==
Curley was born on June 1, 1891, in Newport, Rhode Island. He attended Roxbury Latin School before graduating from Boston College High School in 1909. He attended Boston College, where he was a member of the school's baseball team for two years, was BC's golf champion, was the athletic editor for Boston College's monthly journal, and managed the football team his senior year. His graduating class was the first to publish the Sub Turi class yearbook and Curley served as the associate editor and cartoonist. Curley graduated in 1913 and was the ivy orator of his graduating class.

After graduating, Curley remained involved in athletics as a football official.

== Business career ==
After graduating, Curley entered the leather business. After a year he left for the lumber business and was the president of the Curley Lumber Company of Boston. During World War I, Curley was a lieutenant in the United States Army.

== Athletic director ==
On February 6, 1930, Curley was appointed graduate manager of athletics at Boston College. After Cornell University had a poor 1935 football season, Curley believed that coach Gil Dobie could be persuaded to move to BC. Curley was able to hire Dobie, who helped bring the team to national prominence. Dobie retired after the 1938 season and Curley hired an unknown Fordham assistant, Frank Leahy, who led BC to two bowl games, including a win over Tennessee in the 1941 Sugar Bowl. In 1949, the Boston College Eagles men's ice hockey team, led by head coach John Kelley won the NCAA championship. On July 1, 1957, Curley stepped down as athletic director and was succeeded by William J. Flynn. Curley accepted the new role of director of athletic facilities, which allowed him to oversee the construction of the school's new athletic facilities - Alumni Stadium, McHugh Forum, and Roberts Center, which marked the first time that Boston College had all of its athletic facilities on campus. He remained as director of athletic facilities until his retirement in 1965.

== Later life ==
Curley spent his later years in Hyannis, Massachusetts. He died on December 11, 1973, at Cape Cod Hospital following a long illness.
