= Brad Bates =

American college athletics administrator

Biographical details
- Born: c. 1959

Administrative career (AD unless noted)
- 2002–2012: Miami OH
- 2012–2017: Boston College

Brad Bates (born c. 1959) is a former American college athletics administrator. He was the athletic director at Boston College from 2012 to 2017. He resigned in February 2017 to join the executive search and consulting firm Collegiate Sports Associates.

Bates was previously the athletic director at Miami University from 2002 to 2012. He also spent 17 years working in athletic administration at Vanderbilt University.

He played college football under Bo Schembechler as a defensive back at the University of Michigan where he received a varsity letter as a member of the 1980 team that won the 1980 Rose Bowl. He received a bachelor of arts degree from Michigan in 1981.

At BC, Bates finalized a $200 million strategic plan for new athletic facilities. He was responsible for hiring football coach Steve Addazio and men’s basketball coach Jim Christian. During Bates tenure as AD, the school’s marquee sports programs suffered from poor performance and decreased attendance. During the 2015-16 academic year, Boston College went winless in the ACC in football and men's basketball and compiled an 8-70 record in football, men's basketball and women's basketball.
