= Thomas D. Lavelle =

American lawyer

Thomas D. Lavelle (c. 1880 – May 6, 1954) was an American attorney who practiced in Boston for almost 50 years. From 1909 to 1916 he was the lead assistant in the Suffolk County District Attorney's office.

== Early life ==
Lavelle was born in Charlestown and raised in Dorchester. He graduated from Boston College in 1901. He was president of the Fulton Debating Society his senior year. He served as BC's graduate director of athletics from 1901 to 1903 and was president of the college's alumni association from 1918 to 1919.

== Legal career ==
Lavelle studied law at Boston University and Georgetown University. He was admitted to the bar in 1905. In 1909 he became the lead assistant to Suffolk County District Attorney Joseph C. Pelletier. As an assistant DA, Lavelle led a grand jury investigation into corruption in Revere, Massachusetts that resulted in the indictment and conviction of a member of the city's board of assessors and an inquiry into the conditions of the Collateral Loan Company that resulted in the arrest and conviction of a bookkeeper and his wife. He was also responsible for building the case against Clarence Richeson, who pleaded guilty to murdering his wife. He left the district attorney's office in 1916 to join the office of John P. Feeney. He was succeeded by Daniel J. Gallagher. In 1931, Lavelle was considered for a vacant seat on the Dorchester District Court, but asked to be removed from consideration as he did not want his appointment to be construed as political.

== Politics ==
In 1926, Lavelle was one of many Democrats to challenge incumbent Thomas C. O'Brien. He finished a distant fifth in a seven candidate primary that was won by William J. Foley. Lavelle worked on Al Smith's campaign during the 1928 United States presidential election and managed Joseph B. Ely's 1930 gubernatorial campaign. In 1931, Ely appointed Lavelle to the special metropolitan district water supply commission.

== Death ==
Lavelle died on May 6, 1954, at the Veterans Administration Hospital in Jamaica Plain. He was 73 years old.
