= Steve Cedorchuk =

American ice hockey player and coach

Biographical details
- Born: 1947 (age 78–79); Charlestown, Massachusetts

Playing career
- 1966–1969: Boston College
- 1970–1972: Lowell Tech
- Position: Defenseman

Coaching career (HC unless noted)
- 1973–1975: Saint Anselm College
- 1975–1992: Boston College (assistant)
- 1992–1994: Boston College

Steve Cedorchuk is an American former ice hockey player and coach. He spent more than 20 years affiliated with Boston College

== Head coaching record ==
Record table
Season	Team	Overall	Conference	Standing	Postseason
Saint Anselm Saint A's (ECAC 2) (1973–1975)
1973–74	Saint Anselm	12–11–0	11–7–0		
1974–75	Saint Anselm	13–10–1	11–8–1		ECAC 2 Quarterfinals
Saint Anselm:		25–21–1			
Boston College Eagles (Hockey East) (1992–1994)
1992–93	Boston College	9–24–5	6–15–3	7th	Hockey East Quarterfinals
1993–94	Boston College	15–16–5	7–12–5	6th	Hockey East Quarterfinals
Boston College:		24–40–10	13–27–8		
Total:		49–61–11			
National champion Postseason invitational champion Conference regular season champion Conference regular season and conference tournament champion Division regular season champion Division regular season and conference tournament champion Conference tournament champion
