= Green Line Rivalry =

American college sports rivalry

The Green Line Rivalry
- Boston College Eagles Boston University Terriers
- Sport: Ice hockey
- First meeting: BC 3, BU 1 February 6, 1918
- Latest meeting: BU 5, BC 1 February 28, 2026
- Next meeting: January 29, 2027

Statistics
- Total meetings: 302
- All-time series: BU leads, 143–138–21
- Largest victory: BC 11, BU 0 February 23, 1943
- Longest win streak: BU, 13; December 9, 1992 – March 4, 1995
- Longest unbeaten streak: BU, 16; December 9, 1992 – February 5, 1996
- Current win streak: BU, 2
- Current unbeaten streak: BU, 2

Locations of BC and BU.

The Green Line Rivalry, also known as the B-Line Rivalry, the Battle of Boston and Battle of Commonwealth Avenue, is the name for the sports rivalry between Boston College and Boston University. The rivalry is named after the Green Line, a light rail line that runs along Commonwealth Avenue and links the two schools as part of the MBTA, Boston's public transit system. The two campuses lie less than five miles apart.

The Green Line Rivalry is considered one of the top rivalries in college sports and first among college hockey rivalries.

== Ice hockey ==
=== History ===
The series dates to February 6, 1918, when BU first began playing hockey, and played its lone game that year against BC, a 3–1 loss at the Boston Arena. Since then, no other opponent has appeared on either teams' schedule more often. The rivalry has been renewed annually since the 1946–47 season, and the two teams have met at least twice a year since 1949. The schools have met 300 times; BU leads the series 141–138–21. Since the start of 2000, however, BC holds a 55–39–7 edge in 101 meetings.

With 18 NCAA championship game appearances between them, including a matchup in the 1978 championship game, Boston College and Boston University both field perennially competitive collegiate ice hockey teams. They compete in the Hockey East since 1984, having both previously been members of the ECAC since 1961.

The two teams meet thrice annually as part of their regular Hockey East season schedule, and often also meet in the Hockey East and NCAA postseason tournaments. Additionally, each first and second Monday in February, BC and BU, along with Harvard and Northeastern, take part in the annual Beanpot Tournament held at TD Garden, where the Eagles and Terriers often square off in the championship game. In the 73 years of the tournament, the two teams have played for the Beanpot trophy 24 times, with BU winning 13 of the championship matchups and BC winning 11. Both teams have had stretches where they dominated the tournament, however, the Terriers have triumphed more often, winning the title 32 times compared to the Eagles' 21 titles (Harvard and Northeastern combined have only won 20 times). Since 2010, the Eagles have won 4 of their last 5 meetings in the title game, winning in 2010, 2012, 2016, and 2026, whereas the Terriers defeated BC in the 2025 championship match.

Both teams have won the national championship five times; BC in 1949, 2001, 2008, 2010, 2012 and BU in 1971, 1972, 1978, 1995, 2009. The two rivals faced off in the 1978 championship game in Providence, with BU claiming its third national championship with a 5–3 victory in Providence, RI. BU and BC have met in NCAA tournament play on one other occasion in the 2006 NCAA Men's Division I Ice Hockey Tournament Northeast Regional Final, with the Eagles skating to a 5–0 victory over the top-seeded Terriers.

The rivalry is highlighted by its intensity and mutual contempt between both players and fans. For instance, after BU's victory over BC in the 1978 national championship, BU co-captain Jack O'Callahan was quoted as saying "We shouldn't have to beat BC for the nationals. Hell, we can do that anytime." In a 2005 Sports Illustrated article, BC senior captain Ryan Shannon said that "Every once in a while, out in a restaurant, you see familiar faces. But hockey culture is so humble. Outside the rink, you see those guys as human beings," but when on the rink: "They're evil. They're a Terrier." Games feature an array of chants and insults chanted by each schools' students sections, the BC Superfans and BU Dog Pound.

The rivalry was amplified when on January 8, 2010, BC and BU faced off at Fenway Park, the first men's college hockey game to be played at Boston's iconic ballpark. BU edged BC 3–2 in front of a crowd of 38,000, the largest crowd to ever watch the two schools play.

A documentary about the rivalry entitled The Battle of Comm Ave. was released in 2009 by Rival Films. The documentary contains game footage and interviews with numerous players and coaches.

On November 8, 2013, the teams faced off in the first non York–Parker matchup since 1994. The Eagles defeated the David Quinn-led Terriers 5–1 at Agganis Arena. Parker retired in the 2012–13 offseason after 40 years of coaching the Terriers.

During the 2020–21 season, Agganis Arena was unavailable for play, as it was being used for state COVID-19 pandemic purposes. Thus on February 6, 2021, Walter Brown Arena served as host for a matchup for the first time since January 17, 2004, where the Terries skated to a 3–1 win over No. 1-ranked Boston College.

On December 9, 2022, the Eagles and Terriers met in the first matchup since 1972 that did not include at least one of Jerry York or Jack Parker as head coach of their respective team. York retired in the 2021–22 offseason after 50 years of coaching. BC, led by Greg Brown defeated BU by a score of 9–6 at Conte Forum.

The 2023–24 season saw historic matchups between the two rivals. In their 292nd and 293rd all-time meetings on January 26–27, 2024, the schools battled for the first time as both the 1st and 2nd ranked teams in the country. No. 2-ranked Boston College hosted the No. 1 ranked Terriers at Conte Forum in the opener of the home-and-home series, skating to 4–1 victory. BU hosted the Eagles at Agganis Arena the following night, with Boston College taking a 4–3 victory to earn the weekend sweep. The No. 3-ranked Terriers would avenge their losses just a week later on February 5 by defeating the No. 1-ranked Eagles in the first round of the Beanpot, by a score of 4–3. The two teams would meet for a 4th time in the Hockey East championship game on March 23, once again as the No. 1 and No. 2 ranked teams in the nation. The top-ranked Eagles would skate away with the victory to earn their 12th Hockey East title, after beating BU by a score of 6–2.

During the 2024–25 season, Boston College won the first two meetings of the rivalry, defeating Boston University at Agganis Arena and Conte Forum. Boston University later won the 2025 Beanpot final, securing its 32nd tournament championship. During the final, a prank occurred involving members of the Boston University Dog Pound where members entered the Boston College student section disguised as BC students. These disguised Dog Pound members then proceeded to have the BC student section display a banner during the game which contained a derogatory message directed at Boston College. The incident received attention on social media following the tournament.

The 300th all-time meeting of the rivalry appropriately saw the teams face off against each other in the 2026 Beanpot championship game, the 24th title matchup between the schools. Boston College skated to a 6-2 win, securing the Beanpot crown for their first time since 2016. The game's ceremonial puck drop was conducted by Jerry York and Jack Parker, the first time following both of their retirements where they were each in attendance for a meeting of the Battle of Comm Ave.

=== Game results ===
BC victories	BU victories	Tie games

No.	Date	Location	Winner	Score	Notes
1	February 6, 1918	Boston Arena, Boston, MA	Boston College	3–1	
2	February 4, 1920	Alumni Rink, Newton, MA	Boston College	9–0	
3	January 26, 1923	Boston Arena, Boston, MA	Boston College	3–2^{3OT}	
4	February 7, 1923	Boston Arena, Boston, MA	Boston College	7–2	
5	December 23, 1924	Boston Arena, Boston, MA	Boston University	1–0	
6	February 16, 1925	Boston Arena, Boston, MA	Boston College	3–0	
7	February 4, 1926	Boston Arena, Boston, MA	Boston College	2–1	
8	March 4, 1926	Boston Arena, Boston, MA	Boston University	3–0	
9	January 28, 1927	Boston Arena, Boston, MA	Boston University	3–1	
10	January 20, 1928	Boston Arena, Boston, MA	Tie	3–3^{OT}	
11	February 15, 1928	Boston Arena, Boston, MA	Boston University	3–2	
12	February 29, 1928	Boston Arena, Boston, MA	Boston University	5–0	
13	January 18, 1929	Boston Arena, Boston, MA	Boston University	4–1	
14	February 13, 1929	Boston Arena, Boston, MA	Boston University	4–1	
15	February 17, 1933	Boston Arena, Boston, MA	Boston University	5–1	
16	March 9, 1933	Boston Arena, Boston, MA	Boston University	7–2	
17	February 8, 1934	Boston Arena, Boston, MA	Boston University	3–2	
18	February 16, 1934	Boston Arena, Boston, MA	Boston University	6–3^{OT}	(No sudden-death OT)
19	January 29, 1935	Boston Arena, Boston, MA	Boston College	2–1	
20	February 26, 1935	Boston Arena, Boston, MA	Boston University	5–3	
21	January 10, 1936	Boston Arena, Boston, MA	Boston University	4–3	
22	February 4, 1936	Boston Arena, Boston, MA	Boston College	3–2	
23	January 12, 1937	Boston Arena, Boston, MA	Boston College	6–5^{2OT}	
24	February 13, 1937	Boston Arena, Boston, MA	Boston University	2–1^{OT}	
25	February 8, 1938	Boston Arena, Boston, MA	Boston University	7–2	
26	February 25, 1938	Boston Arena, Boston, MA	Boston College	3–2	
27	February 4, 1939	Boston Arena, Boston, MA	Boston University	7–5^{OT}	(No sudden-death OT)
28	February 18, 1939	Boston Arena, Boston, MA	Boston University	5–4	
29	January 16, 1940	Boston Arena, Boston, MA	Boston College	12–3	
30	February 24, 1940	Boston Arena, Boston, MA	Boston College	7–4	
31	January 14, 1941	Boston Arena, Boston, MA	Boston College	10–3	
32	February 11, 1941	Boston Arena, Boston, MA	Boston College	6–3	
33	January 13, 1942	Boston Arena, Boston, MA	Boston College	8–2	
34	February 10, 1942	Boston Arena, Boston, MA	Boston College	5–2	
35	February 4, 1943	Boston Arena, Boston, MA	Boston College	8–3	
36	February 23, 1943	Boston Arena, Boston, MA	Boston College	11–0	
37	December 10, 1946	Boston Arena, Boston, MA	Boston University	9–5	
38	February 5, 1947	Boston Arena, Boston, MA	Tie	5–5^{OT}	
39	February 3, 1948	Boston Arena, Boston, MA	Boston University	5–3	
40	March 3, 1948	Boston Arena, Boston, MA	Boston College	9–2	
41	December 21, 1948	Boston Arena, Boston, MA	Boston College	5–1	
42	March 1, 1949	Boston Arena, Boston, MA	Boston College	6–2	
43	March 9, 1949	Boston Arena, Boston, MA	Boston College	6–5	NEIHL
44	December 13, 1949	Boston Arena, Boston, MA	Boston College	4–3	
45	February 13, 1950	Boston Arena, Boston, MA	Boston University	8–1	
46	March 7, 1950	Boston Arena, Boston, MA	Boston College	2–1	NEIHL
47	January 8, 1951	Boston Arena, Boston, MA	Boston College	4–2	
48	February 26, 1951	Boston Arena, Boston, MA	Boston University	7–4	
49	March 7, 1951	Boston Arena, Boston, MA	Boston University	4–1	NEIHL
50	February 4, 1952	Boston Arena, Boston, MA	Boston College	6–4	
51	February 13, 1952	Boston Arena, Boston, MA	Boston University	7–1	
52	January 14, 1953	Boston Garden, Boston, MA	Boston College	7–3	
53	January 31, 1953	Boston Arena, Boston, MA	Boston University	5–2	
54	February 13, 1953	Boston Arena, Boston, MA	Boston University	3–0	
55	December 22, 1953	Boston Garden, Boston, MA	Boston College	10–2	
56	February 9, 1954	Boston Garden, Boston, MA	Boston College	6–5	
57	February 7, 1955	Boston Garden, Boston, MA	Boston College	9–5	Beanpot
58	February 14, 1955	Boston Garden, Boston, MA	Boston College	11–1	
59	January 10, 1956	Boston Arena, Boston, MA	Boston College	7–5	
60	February 28, 1956	Boston Arena, Boston, MA	Boston College	7–3	
61	February 5, 1957	Boston Garden, Boston, MA	Boston College	5–4^{OT}	Beanpot
62	February 11, 1957	Boston Garden, Boston, MA	Boston College	2–1	
63	February 25, 1957	Boston Arena, Boston, MA	Tie	4–4^{OT}	
64	January 20, 1958	Boston Garden, Boston, MA	Boston University	7–4	
65	February 3, 1958	Boston Garden, Boston, MA	Boston University	5–4	Beanpot
66	February 26, 1958	Boston Arena, Boston, MA	Boston College	5–3	
67	January 14, 1959	Boston Arena, Boston, MA	Boston University	5–1	
68	February 9, 1959	Boston Garden, Boston, MA	Boston College	7–4	Beanpot
69	February 25, 1959	McHugh Forum, Chestnut Hill, MA	Boston College	3–1	
70	February 8, 1960	Boston Garden, Boston, MA	Boston University	5–2	Beanpot
71	February 24, 1960	Boston Arena, Boston, MA	Boston College	5–0	
72	March 8, 1960	McHugh Forum, Chestnut Hill, MA	Boston University	4–2	
73	February 22, 1961	McHugh Forum, Chestnut Hill, MA	Boston College	7–2	
74	March 7, 1961	McHugh Forum, Chestnut Hill, MA	Boston College	4–2	
75	December 22, 1961	Madison Square Garden, New York, NY	Tie	2–2^{OT}	EHF
76	January 30, 1962	McHugh Forum, Chestnut Hill, MA	Boston College	3–2	
77	February 20, 1962	Boston Arena, Boston, MA	Boston University	4–1	
78	January 9, 1963	Boston Arena, Boston, MA	Boston College	4–1	
79	February 4, 1963	Boston Garden, Boston, MA	Boston College	2–1^{OT}	Beanpot
80	February 27, 1963	McHugh Forum, Chestnut Hill, MA	Boston College	3–1	
81	January 11, 1964	Boston Arena, Boston, MA	Boston University	6–5^{OT}	
82	February 10, 1964	Boston Garden, Boston, MA	Boston College	6–5	Beanpot
83	February 26, 1964	McHugh Forum, Chestnut Hill, MA	Boston University	1–0	
84	January 8, 1965	McHugh Forum, Chestnut Hill, MA	Boston College	5–4^{OT}	
85	February 15, 1965	Boston Garden, Boston, MA	Boston College	5–4	Beanpot
86	February 23, 1965	Boston Arena, Boston, MA	Boston University	5–4	
87	December 11, 1965	Boston Arena, Boston, MA	Boston University	9–2	
88	February 7, 1966	Boston Garden, Boston, MA	Boston University	6–4	Beanpot
89	February 26, 1966	McHugh Forum, Chestnut Hill, MA	Boston University	5–4^{OT}	
90	December 3, 1966	McHugh Forum, Chestnut Hill, MA	Boston University	4–2	
91	December 13, 1966	Boston Arena, Boston, MA	Boston University	8–3	
92	December 12, 1967	Boston Arena, Boston, MA	Boston University	6–3	
93	February 28, 1968	McHugh Forum, Chestnut Hill, MA	Boston University	2–1	
94	January 11, 1969	McHugh Forum, Chestnut Hill, MA	Boston University	10–5	
95	February 3, 1969	Boston Garden, Boston, MA	Boston University	4–2	Beanpot
96	February 26, 1969	Boston Arena, Boston, MA	Boston College	7–3	
97	January 27, 1970	Boston Arena, Boston, MA	Boston University	8–3	
98	February 9, 1970	Boston Garden, Boston, MA	Boston University	5–4	Beanpot
99	February 25, 1970	McHugh Forum, Chestnut Hill, MA	Boston University	8–1	
100	January 9, 1971	McHugh Forum, Chestnut Hill, MA	Boston University	8–3	
101	February 16, 1971	Boston Arena, Boston, MA	Boston University	9–4	
102	January 14, 1972	Walter Brown Arena, Boston, MA	Boston University	4–1	
103	February 7, 1972	Boston Garden, Boston, MA	Boston University	4–2	Beanpot
104	February 23, 1972	McHugh Forum, Chestnut Hill, MA	Boston College	7–5	
105	January 13, 1973	McHugh Forum, Chestnut Hill, MA	Boston College	7–5	
106	February 12, 1973	Boston Garden, Boston, MA	Boston University	4–1	Beanpot
107	February 21, 1973	Walter Brown Arena, Boston, MA	Tie	2–2^{OT}	
108	January 18, 1974	Walter Brown Arena, Boston, MA	Boston University	11–2	
109	February 20, 1974	McHugh Forum, Chestnut Hill, MA	Boston College	7–5	
110	January 18, 1975	McHugh Forum, Chestnut Hill, MA	Boston University	10–3	
111	February 3, 1975	Boston Garden, Boston, MA	Boston University	5–3	Beanpot
112	February 18, 1975	Walter Brown Arena, Boston, MA	Boston University	4–1	
113	January 16, 1976	Walter Brown Arena, Boston, MA	Boston University	4–2	
114	February 9, 1976	Boston Garden, Boston, MA	Boston College	6–3	Beanpot
115	February 18, 1976	McHugh Forum, Chestnut Hill, MA	Boston University	6–4	
116	March 9, 1976	Walter Brown Arena, Boston, MA	Boston University	6–5	ECAC
117	January 22, 1977	Walter Brown Arena, Boston, MA	Tie	6–6^{OT}	
118	February 26, 1977	McHugh Forum, Chestnut Hill, MA	Boston University	6–5	
119	March 8, 1977	Walter Brown Arena, Boston, MA	Boston University	8–7	ECAC
120	January 21, 1978	Walter Brown Arena, Boston, MA	Boston University	6–3	
121	February 6, 1978	Boston Garden, Boston, MA	Boston University	12–5	Beanpot
122	February 16, 1978	McHugh Forum, Chestnut Hill, MA	Boston University	10–5	
123	March 25, 1978	Providence Civic Center, Providence, RI	Boston University	5–3	NCAA Championship
124	January 20, 1979	Walter Brown Arena, Boston, MA	Boston University	4–2	
125	February 12, 1979	Boston Garden, Boston, MA	Boston University	4–3	Beanpot
126	February 27, 1979	McHugh Forum, Chestnut Hill, MA	Boston College	5–3	
127	January 18, 1980	Walter Brown Arena, Boston, MA	Boston College	7–6^{OT}	
128	March 5, 1980	McHugh Forum, Chestnut Hill, MA	Boston College	4–1	
129	January 9, 1981	Walter Brown Arena, Boston, MA	Boston College	6–4	
130	February 2, 1981	Boston Garden, Boston, MA	Boston College	5–2	Beanpot
131	February 24, 1981	McHugh Forum, Chestnut Hill, MA	Boston University	5–3	
132	January 9, 1982	McHugh Forum, Chestnut Hill, MA	Boston College	5–3	
133	February 8, 1982	Boston Garden, Boston, MA	Boston University	3–1	Beanpot
134	March 3, 1982	Walter Brown Arena, Boston, MA	Boston University	5–0	
135	January 8, 1983	Walter Brown Arena, Boston, MA	Boston University	4–3	
136	March 1, 1983	McHugh Forum, Chestnut Hill, MA	Boston University	3–0	
137	January 11, 1984	McHugh Forum, Chestnut Hill, MA	Boston College	4–3^{OT}	
138	February 6, 1984	Boston Garden, Boston, MA	Boston University	6–5	Beanpot
139	February 28, 1984	Walter Brown Arena, Boston, MA	Boston College	4–1	
140	March 9, 1984	Boston Garden, Boston, MA	Boston University	6–4	ECAC
141	November 13, 1984	McHugh Forum, Chestnut Hill, MA	Boston College	6–3	
142	January 8, 1985	Walter Brown Arena, Boston, MA	Boston College	10–1	
143	March 3, 1985	McHugh Forum, Chestnut Hill, MA	Tie	2–2^{OT}	
144	November 13, 1985	Walter Brown Arena, Boston, MA	Boston College	2–1^{OT}	
145	February 10, 1986	Boston Garden, Boston, MA	Boston University	4–1	Beanpot
146	February 19, 1986	McHugh Forum, Chestnut Hill, MA	Boston College	7–4	
147	March 1, 1986	Walter Brown Arena, Boston, MA	Tie	3–3^{OT}	
148	March 15, 1986	Providence Civic Center, Providence, RI	Boston University	9–4	Hockey East
149	December 2, 1986	Boston Garden, Boston, MA	Boston College	9–6	
150	December 6, 1986	Walter Brown Arena, Boston, MA	Boston College	7–5	
151	January 20, 1987	Boston Garden, Boston, MA	Boston College	8–2	
152	January 23, 1987	Walter Brown Arena, Boston, MA	Boston College	5–4^{OT}	
153	February 2, 1987	Boston Garden, Boston, MA	Boston University	6–3	Beanpot
154	November 7, 1987	Walter Brown Arena, Boston, MA	Boston College	4–3	
155	December 9, 1987	Matthews Arena, Boston, MA	Tie	4–4^{OT}	
156	February 27, 1988	Walter Brown Arena, Boston, MA	Boston University	6–3	
157	November 1, 1988	Conte Forum, Chestnut Hill, MA	Boston University	6–3	
158	January 13, 1989	Conte Forum, Chestnut Hill, MA	Boston College	8–3	
159	February 28, 1989	Walter Brown Arena, Boston, MA	Boston College	3–1	
160	November 28, 1989	Conte Forum, Chestnut Hill, MA	Boston University	6–4	
161	January 3, 1990	Walter Brown Arena, Boston, MA	Boston College	3–2	
162	February 5, 1990	Boston Garden, Boston, MA	Boston University	4–3	Beanpot
163	February 27, 1990	Walter Brown Arena, Boston, MA	Boston University	4–2	
164	November 11, 1990	Conte Forum, Chestnut Hill, MA	Boston College	3–2	
165	January 18, 1991	Conte Forum, Chestnut Hill, MA	Boston College	5–2	
166	February 11, 1991	Boston Garden, Boston, MA	Boston University	8–4	Beanpot
167	February 23, 1991	Walter Brown Arena, Boston, MA	Boston College	6–5	
168	December 7, 1991	Walter Brown Arena, Boston, MA	Boston College	5–4^{OT}	
169	January 25, 1992	Walter Brown Arena, Boston, MA	Tie	3–3^{OT}	
170	February 28, 1992	Conte Forum, Chestnut Hill, MA	Boston College	3–2	
171	March 7, 1992	Walter Brown Arena, Boston, MA	Boston College	5–2	
172	December 9, 1992	Walter Brown Arena, Boston, MA	Boston University	7–4	
173	January 15, 1993	Conte Forum, Chestnut Hill, MA	Boston University	5–1	
174	January 16, 1993	Walter Brown Arena, Boston, MA	Boston University	7–2	
175	February 1, 1993	Boston Garden, Boston, MA	Boston University	8–2	Beanpot
176	March 12, 1993	Walter Brown Arena, Boston, MA	Boston University	6–2	Hockey East
177	March 14, 1993	Walter Brown Arena, Boston, MA	Boston University	5–1	Hockey East
178	December 11, 1993	Conte Forum, Chestnut Hill, MA	Boston University	5–2	
179	January 14, 1994	Conte Forum, Chestnut Hill, MA	Boston University	6–2	
180	January 15, 1994	Walter Brown Arena, Boston, MA	Boston University	6–4	
181	January 20, 1995	Conte Forum, Chestnut Hill, MA	Boston University	7–4	
182	January 21, 1995	Walter Brown Arena, Boston, MA	Boston University	5–1	
183	February 13, 1995	Boston Garden, Boston, MA	Boston University	5–1	Beanpot
184	March 4, 1995	Walter Brown Arena, Boston, MA	Boston University	10–3	
185	January 12, 1996	Conte Forum, Chestnut Hill, MA	Tie	4–4^{OT}	
186	January 13, 1996	Walter Brown Arena, Boston, MA	Boston University	10–3	
187	February 5, 1996	Fleet Center, Boston, MA	Boston University	4–1	Beanpot
188	March 2, 1996	Conte Forum, Chestnut Hill, MA	Boston College	3–1	
189	December 11, 1996	Walter Brown Arena, Boston, MA	Boston University	6–4	
190	January 17, 1997	Walter Brown Arena, Boston, MA	Tie	5–5^{OT}	
191	January 18, 1997	Conte Forum, Chestnut Hill, MA	Tie	4–4^{OT}	
192	February 10, 1997	Fleet Center, Boston, MA	Boston University	4–2	Beanpot
193	December 7, 1997	Conte Forum, Chestnut Hill, MA	Boston University	5–1	
194	December 9, 1997	Walter Brown Arena, Boston, MA	Tie	3–3^{OT}	
195	January 9, 1998	Conte Forum, Chestnut Hill, MA	Boston College	4–2	
196	November 20, 1998	Conte Forum, Chestnut Hill, MA	Boston College	6–2	
197	November 21, 1998	Walter Brown Arena, Boston, MA	Boston University	4–2	
198	February 1, 1999	Fleet Center, Boston, MA	Boston University	3–2^{OT}	Beanpot
199	March 5, 1999	Walter Brown Arena, Boston, MA	Boston College	3–2	
200	January 8, 2000	Conte Forum, Chestnut Hill, MA	Tie	4–4^{OT}	
201	January 9, 2000	Walter Brown Arena, Boston, MA	Boston University	2–1	
202	February 14, 2000	Fleet Center, Boston, MA	Boston University	4–1	Beanpot
203	March 5, 2000	Conte Forum, Chestnut Hill, MA	Boston College	6–2	
204	January 6, 2001	Walter Brown Arena, Boston, MA	Boston University	3–2	
205	January 7, 2001	Conte Forum, Chestnut Hill, MA	Boston College	5–2	
206	February 12, 2001	Fleet Center, Boston, MA	Boston College	5–3	Beanpot
207	March 4, 2001	Walter Brown Arena, Boston, MA	Boston College	5–1	
208	November 17, 2001	Conte Forum, Chestnut Hill, MA	Boston College	3–1	
209	January 18, 2002	Conte Forum, Chestnut Hill, MA	Boston University	2–1	
210	January 20, 2002	Walter Brown Arena, Boston, MA	Boston University	3–1	
211	February 4, 2002	Fleet Center, Boston, MA	Boston University	5–3	Beanpot
212	November 15, 2002	Walter Brown Arena, Boston, MA	Boston College	3–2	
213	January 16, 2003	Walter Brown Arena, Boston, MA	Boston College	3–1	
214	January 17, 2003	Conte Forum, Chestnut Hill, MA	Boston College	3–2	
215	February 10, 2003	Fleet Center, Boston, MA	Boston University	3–2	Beanpot
216	March 14, 2003	Fleet Center, Boston, MA	Boston University	6–5^{2OT}	Hockey East
217	December 5, 2003	Conte Forum, Chestnut Hill, MA	Boston College	5–2	
218	January 16, 2004	Conte Forum, Chestnut Hill, MA	Boston College	5–1	
219	January 17, 2004	Walter Brown Arena, Boston, MA	Boston College	3–2	
220	February 9, 2004	Fleet Center, Boston, MA	Boston College	2–1^{OT}	Beanpot
221	March 11, 2004	Conte Forum, Chestnut Hill, MA	Boston University	3–2	Hockey East
222	March 12, 2004	Conte Forum, Chestnut Hill, MA	Boston College	4–0	Hockey East
223	March 13, 2004	Conte Forum, Chestnut Hill, MA	Boston University	4–2	Hockey East
224	December 3, 2004	Walter Brown Arena, Boston, MA	Boston University	3–2	
225	January 14, 2005	Conte Forum, Chestnut Hill, MA	Boston College	6–3	
226	January 15, 2005	Agganis Arena, Boston, MA	Boston College	2–0	
227	February 7, 2005	Fleet Center, Boston, MA	Boston University	2–1	Beanpot
228	December 2, 2005	Conte Forum, Chestnut Hill, MA	Boston College	2–1	
229	December 3, 2005	Agganis Arena, Boston, MA	Boston University	6–2	
230	January 27, 2006	Conte Forum, Chestnut Hill, MA	Boston University	4–3	
231	February 13, 2006	TD Banknorth Garden, Boston, MA	Boston University	3–2	Beanpot
232	March 18, 2006	TD Banknorth Garden, Boston, MA	Boston University	2–1^{OT}	Hockey East
233	March 25, 2006	DCU Center, Worcester, MA	Boston College	5–0	NCAA Quarterfinals
234	December 2, 2006	Agganis Arena, Boston, MA	Boston College	1–0	
235	January 24, 2007	Conte Forum, Chestnut Hill, MA	Boston University	4–1	
236	January 26, 2007	Agganis Arena, Boston, MA	Boston College	5–2	
237	February 12, 2007	TD Banknorth Garden, Boston, MA	Boston University	2–1^{OT}	Beanpot
238	March 16, 2007	TD Banknorth Garden, Boston, MA	Boston College	6–2	Hockey East
239	November 30, 2007	Conte Forum, Chestnut Hill, MA	Boston College	6–2	
240	December 1, 2007	Agganis Arena, Boston, MA	Boston College	4–3	
241	January 19, 2008	Conte Forum, Chestnut Hill, MA	Tie	2–2^{OT}	
242	February 4, 2008	TD Banknorth Garden, Boston, MA	Boston College	4–3^{OT}	Beanpot
243	December 5, 2008	Agganis Arena, Boston, MA	Tie	1–1^{OT}	
244	December 6, 2008	Conte Forum, Chestnut Hill, MA	Boston University	3–1	
245	January 17, 2009	Agganis Arena, Boston, MA	Boston University	5–2	
246	March 20, 2009	TD Garden, Boston, MA	Boston University	3–2	Hockey East
247	December 5, 2009	Agganis Arena, Boston, MA	Boston College	4–1	
248	January 8, 2010	Fenway Park, Boston, MA	Boston University	3–2	Frozen Fenway
249	January 22, 2010	Conte Forum, Chestnut Hill, MA	Boston University	5–4^{OT}	
250	February 8, 2010	TD Garden, Boston, MA	Boston College	4–3	Beanpot
251	December 3, 2010	Agganis Arena, Boston, MA	Boston College	9–5	
252	December 4, 2010	Conte Forum, Chestnut Hill, MA	Boston College	5–2	
253	January 21, 2011	Agganis Arena, Boston, MA	Boston College	3–2	
254	February 7, 2011	TD Garden, Boston, MA	Boston College	3–2^{OT}	Beanpot
255	November 13, 2011	Conte Forum, Chestnut Hill, MA	Boston University	5–0	
256	December 2, 2011	Conte Forum, Chestnut Hill, MA	Boston University	5–3	
257	December 3, 2011	Agganis Arena, Boston, MA	Boston College	6–1	
258	February 13, 2012	TD Garden, Boston, MA	Boston College	3–2^{OT}	Beanpot
259	November 11, 2012	Agganis Arena, Boston, MA	Boston College	4–2	
260	November 30, 2012	Agganis Arena, Boston, MA	Boston University	4–2	
261	December 1, 2012	Conte Forum, Chestnut Hill, MA	Boston College	5–2	
262	March 22, 2013	TD Garden, Boston, MA	Boston University	6–3	Hockey East
263	November 8, 2013	Agganis Arena, Boston, MA	Boston College	5–1	
264	January 17, 2014	Conte Forum, Chestnut Hill, MA	Boston College	6–4	
265	February 3, 2014	TD Garden, Boston, MA	Boston College	3–1	Beanpot
266	November 7, 2014	Conte Forum, Chestnut Hill, MA	Boston University	5–3	
267	January 16, 2015	Agganis Arena, Boston, MA	Boston College	4–2	
268	January 15, 2016	Conte Forum, Chestnut Hill, MA	Boston College	5–3	
269	January 16, 2016	Agganis Arena, Boston, MA	Tie	1–1^{OT}	
270	February 8, 2016	TD Garden, Boston, MA	Boston College	1–0^{OT}	Beanpot
271	January 13, 2017	Agganis Arena, Boston, MA	Boston University	2–1	
272	January 16, 2017	Conte Forum, Chestnut Hill, MA	Boston University	3–0	
273	February 6, 2017	TD Garden, Boston, MA	Boston University	3–1	Beanpot
274	March 17, 2017	TD Garden, Boston, MA	Boston College	3–2	Hockey East
275	December 1, 2017	Conte Forum, Chestnut Hill, MA	Boston University	7–4	
276	December 2, 2017	Agganis Arena, Boston, MA	Boston College	4–1	
277	March 16, 2018	TD Garden, Boston, MA	Boston University	4–3^{OT}	Hockey East
278	November 30, 2018	Agganis Arena, Boston, MA	Boston College	4–1	
279	December 1, 2018	Conte Forum, Chestnut Hill, MA	Tie	0–0^{OT}	
280	January 18, 2020	Conte Forum, Chestnut Hill, MA	Boston College	4–3	
281	February 3, 2020	TD Garden, Boston, MA	Tie	4–4^{OT}	Beanpot
282	February 29, 2020	Agganis Arena, Boston, MA	Boston College	4–1	
283	February 5, 2021	Conte Forum, Chestnut Hill, MA	Boston College	4–3^{OT}	
284	February 6, 2021	Walter Brown Arena, Boston, MA	Boston University	3–1	
285	December 10, 2021	Agganis Arena, Boston, MA	Tie	3–3^{OT}	
286	February 26, 2022	Agganis Arena, Boston, MA	Boston University	6–3	
287	February 27, 2022	Conte Forum, Chestnut Hill, MA	Boston College	3–1	
288	December 9, 2022	Conte Forum, Chestnut Hill, MA	Boston College	9–6	
289	January 27, 2023	Agganis Arena, Boston, MA	Boston University	6–3	
290	January 28, 2023	Conte Forum, Chestnut Hill, MA	Boston University	3–1	
291	February 13, 2023	TD Garden, Boston, MA	Boston College	4–2	Beanpot
292	January 26, 2024	Conte Forum, Chestnut Hill, MA	Boston College	4–1	
293	January 27, 2024	Agganis Arena, Boston, MA	Boston College	4–3	
294	February 5, 2024	TD Garden, Boston, MA	Boston University	4–3	Beanpot
295	March 23, 2024	TD Garden, Boston, MA	Boston College	6–2	Hockey East
296	January 24, 2025	Agganis Arena, Boston, MA	Boston College	6–2	
297	January 25, 2025	Conte Forum, Chestnut Hill, MA	Boston College	2–0	
298	February 10, 2025	TD Garden, Boston, MA	Boston University	4–1	Beanpot
299	January 30, 2026	Agganis Arena, Boston, MA	Boston College	4–1	
300	February 9, 2026	TD Garden, Boston, MA	Boston College	6–2	Beanpot
301	February 27, 2026	Agganis Arena, Boston, MA	Boston University	3–1	
302	February 28, 2026	Conte Forum, Chestnut Hill, MA	Boston University	5–1	
Series: BU leads 143–138–21

== Football ==
"The Green Line Rivalry" originally referred to the football rivalry between the schools, a series begun in 1893 and played annually from 1928 to 1942 and 1954 to 1962. In the 1954 to 1962 run of games both teams competed for the Sacred Cod Trophy in a round-robin series with Holy Cross. With BC leading the series 27–4–1, BU discontinued the rivalry after the 1962 season; a game was scheduled to be played at Fenway Park in 1963 but was scrapped due to the John F. Kennedy assassination and no further games were scheduled in the years that followed. BU eventually terminated its football program in 1997.

The club football team at Boston University expressed interest in renewing the football Green Line Rivalry with Boston College, possibly with a junior varsity team, in the 2015 season; it did not materialize.

=== Game results ===
BC victories	BU victories	Tie games

No.	Date	Location	Winner	Score	Notes
1	November 24, 1893	Boston, MA	Boston College	10–6	South End Grounds
2	November 30, 1894	Boston, MA	Boston University	28–0	South End Grounds
3	November 28, 1895	Boston, MA	Boston University	22–0	South End Grounds
4	November 26, 1896	Boston, MA	Boston College	10–0	South End Grounds
5	November 6, 1920	Boston, MA	Boston College	34–0	Braves Field
6	October 1, 1921	Chestnut Hill, MA	Boston College	13–0	Alumni Field
7	October 7, 1922	Boston, MA	Boston College	20–6	Braves Field
8	October 17, 1925	Boston, MA	Boston College	51–7	Braves Field
9	October 27, 1928	Boston, MA	Boston College	27–7	Fenway Park
10	November 23, 1929	Boston, MA	Boston College	33–0	Fenway Park
11	November 22, 1930	Boston, MA	Boston College	47–7	Fenway Park
12	November 21, 1931	Boston, MA	Boston College	18–6	Fenway Park
13	November 19, 1932	Chestnut Hill, MA	Boston College	21–6	Alumni Field
14	October 28, 1933	Chestnut Hill, MA	Boston College	25–0	Alumni Field
15	November 17, 1934	Chestnut Hill, MA	Boston College	10–0	Alumni Field
16	November 23, 1935	Chestnut Hill, MA	Boston College	25–6	Alumni Field
17	November 21, 1936	Boston, MA	Tie	0–0	Fenway Park

No.	Date	Location	Winner	Score	Notes
18	November 20, 1937	Boston, MA	Boston University	13–6	Fenway Park
19	November 11, 1938	Boston, MA	Boston College	21–14	Fenway Park
20	November 18, 1939	Boston, MA	Boston College	19–0	Fenway Park
21	November 9, 1940	Boston, MA	No. 8 Boston College	21–0	Fenway Park
22	November 22, 1941	Boston, MA	Boston College	19–7	Fenway Park
23	November 21, 1942	Boston, MA	No. 3 Boston College	37–0	Fenway Park
24	November 13, 1954	Boston, MA	Boston College	7–6	Fenway Park
25	November 12, 1955	Boston, MA	Boston College	40–12	Boston University Field
26	November 18, 1956	Boston, MA	Boston College	13–0	Fenway Park
27	November 9, 1957	Boston, MA	Boston College	27–2	Boston University Field
28	November 15, 1958	Chestnut Hill, MA	Boston College	18–13	Alumni Stadium
29	November 14, 1959	Boston, MA	Boston University	26–7	Boston University Field
30	November 12, 1960	Chestnut Hill, MA	Boston College	23–14	Alumni Stadium
31	November 18, 1961	Boston, MA	Boston College	10–7	Boston University Field
32	November 17, 1962	Chestnut Hill, MA	Boston College	41–25	Alumni Stadium
Series: BC leads 27–4–1

== Men's soccer ==
The rivalry is predominant in men's soccer as well. In 2007, CollegeSoccerNews.com named the rivalry one of the 14 best men's college soccer rivalries in the country. Boston College leads the series 25–12–7.

=== Game results ===
BC victories	BU victories	Tie games

No.	Date	Location	Winner	Score
1	October 1, 1978	Chestnut Hill, MA	Boston College	2–1
2	October 3, 1979	Boston, MA	Tie	0–0
3	October 1, 1980	Chestnut Hill, MA	Boston University	2–1
4	September 30, 1981	Boston, MA	Boston College	2–0
5	November 5, 1981	Chestnut Hill, MA	Boston University	2–1
6	November 9, 1982	Chestnut Hill, MA	Boston College	1–0
7	November 8, 1983	Boston, MA	Tie	2–2
8	November 6, 1984	Chestnut Hill, MA	Boston College	1–0
9	November 5, 1985	Boston, MA	Boston College	1–0
10	November 5, 1986	Chestnut Hill, MA	Tie	0–0
11	November 3, 1987	Boston, MA	Boston University	2–1
12	September 11, 1988	Chestnut Hill, MA	Boston University	2–1
13	September 9, 1989	Boston, MA	Boston University	3–0
14	September 19, 1990	Chestnut Hill, MA	Tie	0–0
15	November 11, 1990	Boston, MA	Boston University	3–2
16	September 18, 1991	Boston, MA	Boston College	2–1
17	September 16, 1992	Chestnut Hill, MA	Boston College	4–1
18	September 15, 1993	Boston, MA	Tie	0–0
19	September 14, 1994	Chestnut Hill, MA	Boston University	2–1
20	September 20, 1995	Chestnut Hill, MA	Boston University	2–1
21	September 1, 1996	Boston, MA	Boston University	2–1
22	October 8, 1997	Chestnut Hill, MA	Boston College	1–0
23	September 6, 1998	Boston, MA	Boston University	1–0

No.	Date	Location	Winner	Score
24	September 28, 1999	Chestnut Hill, MA	Tie	3–3
25	September 3, 2000	Chestnut Hill, MA	Boston College	4–3
26	September 29, 2001	Boston, MA	Boston College	1–0
27	September 25, 2002	Chestnut Hill, MA	Boston College	2–1
28	September 1, 2003	Boston, MA	Boston College	2–0
29	September 15, 2004	Chestnut Hill, MA	Boston College	2–1
30	September 4, 2005	Boston, MA	Boston College	1–0
31	August 25, 2006	Chestnut Hill, MA	Boston University	2–1
32	September 1, 2007	Boston, MA	Boston College	1–0
33	August 29, 2008	Chestnut Hill, MA	Boston College	2–1
34	September 18, 2009	Boston, MA	Boston College	1–0
35	September 17, 2010	Chestnut Hill, MA	Boston College	4–0
36	October 18, 2011	Boston, MA	Boston College	1–0
37	August 27, 2012	Chestnut Hill, MA	Boston University	1–0
38	August 30, 2013	Boston, MA	Boston College	2–1
39	October 21, 2014	Chestnut Hill, MA	Boston College	3–1
40	August 31, 2015	Boston, MA	Boston College	3–2
41	August 28, 2016	Chestnut Hill, MA	Boston College	3–2
42	August 27, 2017	Boston, MA	Boston College	4–0
43	August 27, 2018	Chestnut Hill, MA	Tie	3–3
44	September 1, 2019	Boston, MA	Boston College	1–0
Series: BC leads 25–12–7

== Other sports ==
The Green Line Rivalry has also come to refer to the rivalry between BC and BU in other sports. In soccer, the two schools regularly open the season against each other with the expectation of large freshman-filled crowds.

== See also ==
- List of NCAA college football rivalry games
- College rivalries
